= List of MPs elected in the 1734 British general election =

1734–1741 Parliament of Great Britain
←	1727–1734 Parliament	1741–1747 Parliament	→

Overview
- Legislative body: Parliament of Great Britain
- Meeting place: Palace of Westminster
- Term: 14 January 1735 – 27 April 1741
- Election: 1734 British general election
- Government: Walpole ministry

House of Commons
- Members: 558
- Speaker: Arthur Onslow
- Leader: Robert Walpole
- Prime Minister: Robert Walpole

House of Lords
- Lord Chancellor: Earl of Hardwicke (from 21 February 1737); Baron Talbot (until 14 February 1737)
- Leader: Earl of Harrington

Crown-in-Parliament George II

Sessions
- 1st: 14 January 1735 – 15 May 1735
- 2nd: 15 January 1736 – 20 May 1736
- 3rd: 1 February 1737 – 21 June 1737
- 4th: 24 January 1738 – 20 May 1738
- 5th: 1 February 1739 – 14 June 1739
- 6th: 15 November 1739 – 29 April 1740
- 7th: 18 November 1740 – 25 April 1741

List of MPs elected in the 1734 British general election

This is a list of the 558 MPs or members of Parliament elected to the 314 constituencies of the Parliament of Great Britain in 1734, the 8th Parliament of Great Britain and their replacements returned at subsequent by-elections, arranged by constituency.

Elections took place between 22 April 1734 and 6 June 1734.

Table of contents:

A B C D E F G H I J K L M N O P Q R S T U V W X Y Z By-elections Changes

== A ==
Aberdeen Burghs (seat 1/1)	John Middleton - died Replaced by John Maule 1739	Whig; Whig
Aberdeenshire (seat 1/1)	Sir Arthur Forbes	Whig
Abingdon (seat 1/1)	Robert Hucks	Whig
Aldborough (seat 1/2)	Henry Pelham – sat for Sussex; Replaced by John Jewkes 1735	Whig; Whig
Aldborough (seat 2/2)	William Jessop – died Replaced by Andrew Wilkinson 1735	Whig; Whig
Aldeburgh (seat 1/2)	William Conolly	Whig
Aldeburgh (seat 2/2)	George Purvis - died Replaced by Francis Gashry 1741	Whig; Whig
Amersham (seat 1/2)	Sir Henry Marshall	Tory
Amersham (seat 2/2)	Thomas Lutwyche - died Replaced by Thomas Gore 1735	Tory. Tory
Andover (seat 1/2)	John Pollen	Whig
Andover (seat 2/2)	William Guidott	.Whig
Anglesey (seat 1/1)	Sir Nicholas Bayly, Bt	Opp. Whig
Anstruther Easter Burghs (seat 1/1)	Philip Anstruther	
Appleby (seat 1/2)	Walter Plumer	Whig
Appleby (seat 2/2)	John Ramsden	Ind Whig
Argyllshire (seat 1/1)	Sir James Campbell - sat for Stirlingshire; Replaced by Charles Campbell 1736	. Whig
Arundel (seat 1/2)	Sir John Shelley, Bt	Whig
Arundel (seat 2/2)	John Lumley - died Replaced by Garton Orme 1739	
Ashburton (seat 1/2)	Sir William Yonge - sat for Honiton; Replaced by Thomas Bladen 1735	Whig.
Ashburton (seat 2/2)	Roger Tuckfield - died Replaced by Joseph Taylor 1739	Whig; Opp Whig
Aylesbury (seat 1/2)	George Champion	Whig
Aylesbury (seat 2/2)	Christopher Tower	Whig
Ayr Burghs (seat 1/1)	James Stuart	Whig
Ayrshire (seat 1/1)	James Campbell	Whig
== B ==
Banbury (seat 1/1)	Viscount Wallingford - died Replaced by William Moore 1740	. Opp Whig
Banffshire (seat 1/1)	James Abercromby	Whig
Barnstaple (seat 1/2)	Sir John Chichester - died Replaced by John Basset 1740	Tory.
Barnstaple (seat 2/2)	Theophilus Fortescue	Whig
Bath (seat 1/2)	General George Wade	
Bath (seat 2/2)	John Codrington	Tory
Beaumaris (seat 1/1)	The 5th Viscount Bulkeley - died Replaced by The 6th Viscount Bulkeley 1739	Tory; Tory
Bedford (seat 1/2)	Samuel Ongley	Tory
Bedford (seat 2/2)	Sir Jeremy Sambrooke - died Replaced by Sir Boteler Chernock 1740	Tory; Tory
Bedfordshire (seat 1/2)	John Spencer - sat for New Woodstock; Replaced by Sir Roger Burgoyne 1735	Tory
Bedfordshire (seat 2/2)	Sir Rowland Alston, 4th Bt	Whig
Bere Alston (seat 1/2)	Sir Francis Henry Drake - died Replaced by Samuel Heathcote 1740	. Whig
Bere Alston (seat 2/2)	John Bristow	Whig
Berkshire (seat 1/2)	William Archer - died Replaced by Peniston Powney 1739	Tory; Tory
Berkshire (seat 2/2)	Winchcomb Packer	Tory
Berwickshire (seat 1/1)	Hon. Alexander Hume-Campbell	Opp Whig
Berwick-upon-Tweed (seat 1/2)	George Liddell - died Replaced by Thomas Watson 1740	Whig; Tory
Berwick-upon-Tweed (seat 2/2)	Viscount Polwarth; Replaced by The Viscount Barrington 1740	. Tory
Beverley (seat 1/2)	Sir Charles Hotham - died Replaced by Charles Pelham 1738	Whig. Tory
Beverley (seat 2/2)	Ellerker Bradshaw	
Bewdley (seat 1/1)	William Bowles - sat for Bridport; Replaced by Phineas Bowles 1735	Whig; Whig
Bishop's Castle (seat 1/2)	Robert More	Whig
Bishop's Castle (seat 2/2)	Edward Kynaston	Tory
Bletchingley (seat 1/2)	Kenrick Clayton	
Bletchingley (seat 2/2)	Sir William Clayton, bt	
Bodmin (seat 1/2)	Sir John Heathcote	Whig
Bodmin (seat 2/2)	John LaRoche	Whig
Boroughbridge (seat 1/2)	George Gregory	Whig
Boroughbridge (seat 2/2)	James Tyrrell	
Bossiney (seat 1/2)	The Viscount Palmerston	
Bossiney (seat 2/2)	Townshend Andrews - died Replaced by Peregrine Poulett 1737	Whig.
Boston (seat 1/2)	Albemarle Bertie	Whig
Boston (seat 2/2)	Richard Fydell	Tory
Brackley (seat 1/2)	George Lee	Whig
Brackley (seat 2/2)	Paul Methuen	Whig
Bramber (seat 1/2)	Sir Harry Gough	
Bramber (seat 2/2)	Harry Gough (senior)	
Brecon (seat 1/1)	John Talbot	Whig
Breconshire (seat 1/1)	John Jeffreys	
Bridgnorth (seat 1/2)	Thomas Whitmore	Whig
Bridgnorth (seat 2/2)	Grey James Grove	
Bridgwater (seat 1/2)	George Dodington	Whig
Bridgwater (seat 2/2)	Thomas Palmer - died Replaced by Charles Wyndham 1735	Tory; Tory
Bridport (seat 1/2)	William Bowles	Whig
Bridport (seat 2/2)	Solomon Ashley	
Bristol (seat 1/2)	Thomas Coster - died Replaced by Edward Southwell 1739	Tory; Opp. WHig
Bristol (seat 2/2)	Sir Abraham Elton, BtI	Whig
Buckingham (seat 1/2)	George Chamberlayne	Whig
Buckingham (seat 2/2)	Richard Grenville	
Buckinghamshire (seat 1/2)	William Stanhope	Opp. Whig
Buckinghamshire (seat 2/2)	Sir Thomas Lee	Whig
Bury St Edmunds (seat 1/2)	Thomas Hervey	
Bury St Edmunds (seat 2/2)	Thomas Norton	Whig
Buteshire (seat 1/1)	Patrick Campbell	
== C ==
Caernarvon Boroughs (seat 1/1)	Sir Thomas Wynn, Bt	Whig
Caernarvonshire (seat 1/1)	John Griffith - died Replaced by John Wynn 1740	Whig; Whig
Caithness (seat 0/0)	Alternating seat with Buteshire -unrepresented in this Parliament	
Callington (seat 1/2)	Thomas Coplestone	Whig
Callington (seat 2/2)	Isaac le Heup	Whig
Calne (seat 1/2)	William Duckett	Whig
Calne (seat 2/2)	Walter Hungerford	
Cambridge (seat 1/2)	Sir John Hynde Cotton	Tory
Cambridge (seat 2/2)	Thomas Bacon - died Replaced by Gilbert Affleck 1737	Tory; Tory
Cambridgeshire (seat 1/2)	Henry Bromley	Whig
Cambridgeshire (seat 2/2)	Samuel Shepheard	
Cambridge University (seat 1/2)	Edward Finch	Whig
Cambridge University (seat 2/2)	Thomas Townshend	Whig
Camelford (seat 1/2)	Sir Thomas Lyttelton	Whig
Camelford (seat 2/2)	James Cholmondeley	Whig
Canterbury (seat 1/2)	Sir William Hardres, Bt – unseated on petition Replaced by Sir Thomas Hales, Bt 1735	Tory; Whig
Canterbury (seat 2/2)	Thomas May	Tory
Cardiff Boroughs (seat 1/1)	Herbert Windsor - succeeded to a peerage Replaced by Herbert Mackworth 1739	Tory; Tory
Cardigan Boroughs (seat 1/1)	Richard Lloyd	Whig
Cardiganshire (seat 1/1)	Walter Lloyd	
Carlisle (seat 1/2)	Charles Howard	
Carlisle (seat 2/2)	John Hylton	Tory
Carmarthen (seat 1/1)	Arthur Bevan	Whig
Carmarthenshire (seat 1/1)	Sir Nicholas Williams	Whig
Castle Rising (seat 1/2)	Thomas Hanmer - died Replaced by Viscount Andover 1737	Tory; Tory
Castle Rising (seat 2/2)	Charles Churchill	Whig
Cheshire (seat 1/2)	Charles Cholmondeley	Tory
Cheshire (seat 2/2)	John Crewe	
Chester (seat 1/2)	Sir Charles Bunbury	Tory
Chester (seat 2/2)	Robert Grosvenor	Tory
Chichester (seat 1/2)	James Brudenell	Whig
Chichester (seat 2/2)	Thomas Yates	
Chippenham (seat 1/2)	Rogers Holland took office Replaced by Edward Bayntun Rolt 1737	Whig; Opp. Whig
Chippenham (seat 2/2)	Richard Long	Tory
Chipping Wycombe (seat 1/2)	Harry Waller	Whig
Chipping Wycombe (seat 2/2)	Edmund Waller - sat for Great Marlow; Replaced by Sir Charles Vernon 1735	Whig; Tory
Christchurch (seat 1/2)	Joseph Hinxman - died Replaced by Charles Armand Powlett 1740	. Whig
Christchurch (seat 2/2)	Edward Hooper	
Cirencester (seat 1/2)	Thomas Master	Tory
Cirencester (seat 2/2)	William Wodehouse - sat for Norfolk; Replaced by Henry Bathurst 1735	Tory; Tory
City of Durham	see Durham (City of)	...
City of London	see London (City of)	...
Clackmannanshire (seat 1/1)	James Erskine	
Clitheroe (seat 1/2)	Thomas Lister	Tory
Clitheroe (seat 2/2)	William Curzon	
Clyde Burghs	see Glasgow Burghs	...
Cockermouth (seat 1/2)	Sir Wilfrid Lawson - died Replaced by Eldred Curwen 1738	Opp. Whig.
Cockermouth (seat 2/2)	William Finch	Opp. Whig
Colchester (seat 1/2)	Isaac Lemyng Rebow - died Replaced by Jacob Houblon 1735	Whig; Tory
Colchester (seat 2/2)	Matthew Martin	Whig
Corfe Castle (seat 1/2)	John Bond	
Corfe Castle (seat 2/2)	John Bankes	Tory
Cornwall (seat 1/2)	Sir William Carew, Bt	Tory
Cornwall (seat 2/2)	Sir John St Aubyn, Bt	Tory
County Durham	see Durham (County)	...
Coventry (seat 1/2)	Sir Adolphus Oughton - died Replaced by John Neale 1737	Whig.
Coventry (seat 2/2)	John Bird; Replaced by Earl of Euston 1737	
Cricklade (seat 1/2)	Sir Thomas Reade	Whig
Cricklade (seat 2/2)	William Gore - died Replaced by Charles Gore 1739	Tory; Tory
Cromartyshire (seat 0/0)	Alternating seat with Nairnshire - unrepresented in this Parliament	
Cumberland (seat 1/2)	James Lowther	Whig
Cumberland (seat 2/2)	Sir Joseph Pennington, Bt	Whig
== D ==
Dartmouth (seat 1/2)	George Treby	Whig
Dartmouth (seat 2/2)	Walter Carey	Whig
Denbigh Boroughs (seat 1/1)	John Myddelton	Tory
Denbighshire (seat 1/1)	Watkin Williams	Tory
Derby (seat 1/2)	Lord James Cavendish	Whig
Derby (seat 2/2)	Charles Stanhope - died Replaced by John Stanhope 1736	Opp. Whig; Opp. Whig
Derbyshire (seat 1/2)	Lord Charles Cavendish	Whig
Derbyshire (seat 2/2)	Sir Nathaniel Curzon, 4th Bt.	Tory
Devizes (seat 1/2)	Francis Eyles	Whig
Devizes (seat 2/2)	Sir Joseph Eyles - died Replaced by John Garth 1740	Whig; Whig
Devon (seat 1/2)	Sir William Courtenay - died Replaced by John Bampfylde 1736	Whig; Tory
Devon (seat 2/2)	Henry Rolle	Tory
Dorchester (seat 1/2)	Sir William Chapple - resigned Replaced by Robert Browne 1737	Whig; Tory
Dorchester (seat 2/2)	John Browne	Tory
Dorset (seat 1/2)	George Chafin	Tory
Dorset (seat 2/2)	Edmund Morton Pleydell	Tory
Dover (seat 1/2)	David Papillon	
Dover (seat 2/2)	Thomas Revell	
Downton (seat 1/2)	Anthony Duncombe	Whig
Downton (seat 2/2)	Joseph Windham-Ashe	Whig
Droitwich (seat 1/2)	Edward Foley	Tory
Droitwich (seat 2/2)	Thomas Winnington	Whig
Dumfries Burghs (seat 1/1)	Charles Erskine sat for Dumfriesshire; Replaced by William Kirkpatrick and Sir John Douglas 1735 - double return Replaced by William Kirkpatrick 1736 - resigned Replaced by Sir Robert Laurie 1738	
Dumfriesshire (seat 1/1)	Charles Erskine	
Dunbartonshire (seat 1/1)	John Campbell	Whig
Dunwich (seat 1/2)	Sir George Downing, Bt	Whig
Dunwich (seat 2/2)	Sir Orlando Bridgeman - resigned Replaced by William Morden 1738	Whig.
Durham (City of) (seat 1/2)	John Shafto	Tory
Durham (City of) (seat 2/2)	Henry Lambton	Whig
Durham (County) (seat 1/2)	George Bowes	Whig
Durham (County) (seat 2/2)	John Hedworth	Ind. Whig
Dysart Burghs (seat 1/1)	Hon. Thomas Leslie	
== E ==
East Grinstead (seat 1/2)	The Earl of Middlesex	
East Grinstead (seat 2/2)	Edward Conyers	Tory
East Looe (seat 1/2)	Charles Longueville	Whig
East Looe (seat 2/2)	Edward Trelawny ineligible to sit Replaced by Samuel Holden 1735 - died Replaced by Henry Legge 1740	,. Whig
East Retford (seat 1/2)	John White	Whig
East Retford (seat 2/2)	Sir Robert Clifton	
Edinburgh (seat 1/1)	Paul Lindsay	
Edinburghshire (seat 1/1)	Robert Dundas - resigned Replaced by Sir Charles Gilmour 1737	. Opp.Whig
Elgin Burghs (seat 1/1)	William Steuart	Whig
Elginshire (seat 1/1)	Alexander Brodie	Whig
Essex (seat 1/2)	Thomas Bramston	
Essex (seat 2/2)	Sir Robert Abdy	Tory
Evesham (seat 1/2)	Sir John Rushout	Whig
Evesham (seat 2/2)	William Taylor	
Exeter (seat 1/2)	John King - succeeded to a peerage Replaced by Sir Henry Northcote 1735	
Exeter (seat 2/2)	Thomas Balle	
Eye (seat 1/2)	Stephen Cornwallis	Whig
Eye (seat 2/2)	John Cornwallis	Whig
== F ==
Fife (seat 1/1)	Sir John Anstruther	
Flint Boroughs (seat 1/1)	Sir George Wynne, Bt	Whig
Flintshire (seat 1/1)	Sir Thomas Mostyn, 4th Baronet	Tory
Forfarshire (seat 1/1)	Thomas Lyon - succeeded to peerage Replaced by William Maule 1735	Tory.
Fowey (seat 1/2)	Jonathan Rashleigh	Tory
Fowey (seat 2/2)	John Hedges - died Replaced by William Wardour 1737	Whig.
== G ==
Gatton (seat 1/2)	William Newland - died Replaced by George Newland 1738	Tory.
Gatton (seat 2/2)	Paul Docminique - died Replaced by Charles Docminique 1735	Tory.
Glamorganshire (seat 1/1)	William Talbot - succeeded to a peerage Replaced by Bussy Mansel 1737	
Glasgow Burghs (seat 1/1)	William Campbell	
Gloucester (seat 1/2)	Benjamin Bathurst I	
Gloucester (seat 2/2)	John Selwyn	
Gloucestershire (seat 1/2)	Thomas Chester	Tory
Gloucestershire (seat 2/2)	Benjamin Bathurst II	Tory
Grampound (seat 1/2)	Philip Hawkins - died Replaced by Thomas Trefusis 1739	Whig.
Grampound (seat 2/2)	Thomas Hales	Whig
Grantham (seat 1/2)	Sir Michael Newton	
Grantham (seat 2/2)	The Viscount Tyrconnel	Whig
Great Bedwyn (seat 1/2)	Robert Murray - died Replaced by Edward Popham 1738	
Great Bedwyn (seat 2/2)	William Sloper	
Great Grimsby (seat 1/2)	Sir Robert Sutton	
Great Grimsby (seat 2/2)	Robert Knight	
Great Marlow (seat 1/2)	Edmund Waller	Whig
Great Marlow (seat 2/2)	Sir Thomas Hoby	
Great Yarmouth (seat 1/2)	William Townshend - died Replaced by Roger Townshend 1738	
Great Yarmouth (seat 2/2)	Edward Walpole	Whig
Guildford (seat 1/2)	Richard Onslow - succeeded to a peerage Replaced by Denzil Onslow 1740	
Guildford (seat 2/2)	Colonel Richard Onslow	Whig
== H ==
Haddington Burghs (seat 1/1)	James Fall	
Haddingtonshire (seat 1/1)	John Cockburn	
Hampshire (seat 1/2)	Lord Harry Powlett	Whig
Hampshire (seat 2/2)	Edward Lisle	Whig
Harwich (seat 1/2)	Carteret Leathes	
Harwich (seat 2/2)	Charles Stanhope	
Haslemere (seat 1/2)	James Oglethorpe	Tory
Haslemere (seat 2/2)	Peter Burrell	
Hastings (seat 1/2)	Thomas Pelham	
Hastings (seat 2/2)	Sir William Ashburnham	
Haverfordwest (seat 1/1)	Sir Erasmus Philipps	
Hedon (seat 1/2)	Sir Francis Boynton - died Replaced by Harry Pulteney 1739	. Whig
Hedon (seat 2/2)	George Berkeley	
Helston (seat 1/2)	John Evelyn	Whig
Helston (seat 2/2)	John Harris	
Hereford (seat 1/2)	Thomas Foley	
Hereford (seat 2/2)	Sir John Morgan	
Herefordshire (seat 1/2)	Velters Cornewall	Tory
Herefordshire (seat 2/2)	Edward Harley	Tory
Hertford (seat 1/2)	Nathaniel Brassey	
Hertford (seat 2/2)	Sir Thomas Clarke	
Hertfordshire (seat 1/2)	William Plumer	
Hertfordshire (seat 2/2)	Sir Thomas Saunders Sebright - died Replaced by Charles Caesar 1736	. Tory
Heytesbury (seat 1/2)	Pierce A'Court-Ashe	
Heytesbury (seat 2/2)	Edward Ashe	Whig
Higham Ferrers (seat 1/1)	John Finch	
Hindon (seat 1/2)	Stephen Fox - sat for Shaftesbury; Replaced by Henry Fox 1735	
Hindon (seat 2/2)	George Fox	
Honiton (seat 1/2)	William Courtenay	
Honiton (seat 2/2)	Sir William Yonge	Whig
Horsham (seat 1/2)	Charles Eversfield	Whig
Horsham (seat 2/2)	Henry Ingram - raised to peerage Replaced by Charles Ingram 1737	
Huntingdon (seat 1/2)	Edward Wortley Montagu	Whig
Huntingdon (seat 2/2)	Roger Handasyd	
Huntingdonshire (seat 1/2)	Lord Robert Montagu - succeeded to a peerage Replaced by Charles Clarke 1739	
Huntingdonshire (seat 2/2)	Robert Piggott	
Hythe (seat 1/2)	Captain Hercules Baker	Whig
Hythe (seat 2/2)	William Glanville	Whig
== I ==
Ilchester (seat 1/2)	Charles Lockyer	Whig
Ilchester (seat 2/2)	Sir Robert Brown	
Inverness Burghs (seat 1/1)	Duncan Forbes - resigned Replaced by Duncan Urquhart 1737	
Inverness-shire (seat 1/1)	Sir James Grant, Bt.	Whig
Ipswich (seat 1/2)	Samuel Kent	
Ipswich (seat 2/2)	William Wollaston	
== K ==
Kent (seat 1/2)	The Viscount Vane - died Replaced by Sir Christopher Powell 1735	Whig
Kent (seat 2/2)	Sir Edward Dering	Tory
Kincardineshire (seat 1/1)	John Falconer	
King's Lynn (seat 1/2)	Sir Robert Walpole	Whig
King's Lynn (seat 2/2)	Sir Charles Turner - died Replaced by Sir John Turner 1739	Whig.
Kingston upon Hull (seat 1/2)	George Crowle	Whig
Kingston upon Hull (seat 2/2)	Henry Maister	Whig
Kinross-shire (seat 0/0)	Alternating seat with Clackmannanshire - unrepresented in this Parliament	
Kirkcudbright Stewartry (seat 1/1)	Patrick Heron	
Knaresborough (seat 1/2)	Richard Arundell	Whig
Knaresborough (seat 2/2)	Sir Henry Slingsby, Bt	Tory
== L ==
Lanarkshire (seat 1/1)	Lord William Hamilton - died Replaced by Sir James Hamilton 1735	Whig
Lancashire (seat 1/2)	Sir Edward Stanley - succeeded to a peerage Replaced by Peter Bold 1736	. Tory
Lancashire (seat 2/2)	Richard Shuttleworth	Tory
Lancaster (seat 1/2)	Robert Fenwick	
Lancaster (seat 2/2)	Sir Thomas Lowther	
Launceston (seat 1/2)	Hon. John King; Replaced by Sir William Irby	
Launceston (seat 2/2)	Sir William Morice	
Leicester (seat 1/2)	George Wrighte	Tory
Leicester (seat 2/2)	Sir George Beaumont - died Replaced by James Wigley 1737	
Leicestershire (seat 1/2)	Ambrose Phillipps; Replaced by Lord Grey 1738 - succeeded to a peerage Replaced by Lord Guernsey 1739	Tory..
Leicestershire (seat 2/2)	Edward Smith	
Leominster (seat 1/2)	Robert Harley	
Leominster (seat 2/2)	Sir George Caswall	Whig
Lewes (seat 1/2)	Thomas Pelham I	Whig
Lewes (seat 2/2)	Thomas Pelham - died Replaced by John Morley Trevor 1738	
Lichfield (seat 1/2)	George Venables Vernon	
Lichfield (seat 2/2)	Rowland Hill	
Lincoln (seat 1/2)	Charles Monson	
Lincoln (seat 2/2)	Coningsby Sibthorp	
Lincolnshire (seat 1/2)	Robert Vyner	Ind. Whig
Lincolnshire (seat 2/2)	Sir Thomas Lumley Saunderson - succeeded to a peerage Replaced by Thomas Whichcot 1740	Opp. Whig.
Linlithgow Burghs (seat 1/1)	James Carmichael	
Linlithgowshire (seat 1/1)	Alexander Hamilton	
Liskeard (seat 1/2)	Richard Eliot	
Liskeard (seat 2/2)	George Dennis - died Replaced by Charles Trelawny 1740	
Liverpool (seat 1/2)	Thomas Salusbury	Whig
Liverpool (seat 2/2)	Richard Gildart	
London (City of) (seat 1/4)	Robert Willimot	Tory
London (City of) (seat 2/4)	Sir John Barnard	Whig
London (City of) (seat 3/4)	Micajah Perry	Whig
London (City of) (seat 4/4)	Humphry Parsons	Tory
Lostwithiel (seat 1/2)	Richard Edgcumbe	
Lostwithiel (seat 2/2)	Philip Lloyd - died Replaced by Matthew Ducie Moreton 1735- succeeded to a peerage Replaced by John Crosse 1736	
Ludgershall (seat 1/2)	Peter Delmé	
Ludgershall (seat 2/2)	Daniel Boone	
Ludlow (seat 1/2)	Henry Herbert	Whig
Ludlow (seat 2/2)	Richard Herbert	Whig
Lyme Regis (seat 1/2)	John Scrope	
Lyme Regis (seat 2/2)	Henry Holt Henley	Whig
Lymington (seat 1/2)	Sir John Cope, Bt	
Lymington (seat 2/2)	Colonel Maurice Bocland	
== M ==
Maidstone (seat 1/2)	William Horsemonden-Turner	
Maidstone (seat 2/2)	John Finch - died Replaced by Robert Fairfax 1740	Tory.
Maldon (seat 1/2)	Henry Parsons - died Replaced by Benjamin Keene 1740	Whig.
Maldon (seat 2/2)	Martin Bladen	
Malmesbury (seat 1/2)	Giles Earle	
Malmesbury (seat 2/2)	William Rawlinson Earle	
Malton (seat 1/2)	Henry Finch	Whig
Malton (seat 2/2)	Sir William Wentworth	
Marlborough (seat 1/2)	Francis Seymour	
Marlborough (seat 2/2)	Edward Lisle - sat for Hampshire; Replaced by John Crawley 1737	Whig.
Marlow	see Great Marlow	...
Melcombe Regis	see Weymouth and Melcombe Regis	...
Merionethshire (seat 1/1)	William Vaughan	Ind
Middlesex (seat 1/2)	William Pulteney	Whig
Middlesex (seat 2/2)	Sir Francis Child - died Replaced by Sir Hugh Smithson 1740	Tory; Tory
Midhurst (seat 1/2)	Bulstrode Peachey Knight - died Replaced by Sir Henry Peachey 1736 - died Replaced by Sir John Peachey 1738	
Midhurst (seat 2/2)	Thomas Bootle	
Milborne Port (seat 1/2)	Michael Harvey	Tory
Milborne Port (seat 2/2)	Thomas Medlycott	Whig
Minehead (seat 1/2)	Alexander Luttrell - died Replaced by Sir William Codrington 1737 - died Replaced by Thomas Carew 1739	Tory.
Minehead (seat 2/2)	Francis Whitworth	
Mitchell (seat 1/2)	Thomas Watts	
Mitchell (seat 2/2)	Robert Ord	
Monmouth Boroughs (seat 1/1)	Lord Charles Somerset	
Monmouthshire (seat 1/2)	Thomas Morgan, the Elder	
Monmouthshire (seat 2/2)	John Hanbury - died Replaced by Charles Hanbury Williams 1735	Whig.
Montgomery (seat 1/1)	(Sir)William Corbet	
Montgomeryshire (seat 1/1)	Price Devereux - succeeded to a peerage Replaced by Robert Williams 1740	Tory.
Morpeth (seat 1/2)	Viscount Morpeth - succeeded to a peerage Replaced by Henry Furnese 1738	Whig.
Morpeth (seat 2/2)	Sir Henry Liddell	
Much Wenlock (seat 1/2)	see Wenlock	...
== N ==
Nairnshire (seat 1/1)	John Campbell - sat for Pembrokeshire; Replaced by Alexander Brodie 1735	
Newark (seat 1/2)	Richard Sutton - died Replaced by Lord William Manners 1738	
Newark (seat 2/2)	James Pelham	
Newcastle-under-Lyme (seat 1/2)	Baptist Leveson-Gower	
Newcastle-under-Lyme (seat 2/2)	John Lawton - died Replaced by Randle Wilbraham 1740	
Newcastle-upon-Tyne (seat 1/2)	Sir Walter Calverley-Blackett, Bt	
Newcastle-upon-Tyne (seat 2/2)	Nicholas Fenwick	Tory
Newport (Cornwall) (seat 1/2)	Thomas Herbert - died Replaced by Nicholas Herbert 1740	
Newport (Cornwall) (seat 2/2)	Sir John Molesworth	
Newport (Isle of Wight) (seat 1/2)	William Fortescue - resigned Replaced by The Viscount Boyne 1736	
Newport (Isle of Wight) (seat 2/2)	George Huxley	
New Radnor Boroughs (seat 1/1)	Thomas Lewis	Whig
New Romney (seat 1/2)	Stephen Bisse	
New Romney (seat 2/2)	David Papillon - sat for Dover; Replaced by Sir Robert Austen 1736	
New Shoreham (seat 1/2)	Thomas Frederick - died Replaced by John Frederick 1740	
New Shoreham (seat 2/2)	John Phillipson	
Newton (Lancashire) (seat 2/2)	Legh Master	Tory
Newton (Lancashire) (seat 1/2)	William Shippen	
Newtown (Isle of Wight) (seat 1/2)	James Worsley	
Newtown (Isle of Wight) (seat 2/2)	Thomas Holmes	Whig
New Windsor (seat 1/2)	Richard Oldfield and Lord Vere Beauclerk - double return Replaced by Lord Vere Beauclerk 1738	
New Windsor (seat 2/2)	Lord Sidney Beauclerk	
New Woodstock (seat 2/2)	James Dawkins	
New Woodstock (seat 1/2)	John Spencer	
Norfolk (seat 1/2)	William Wodehouse - died Replaced by Armine Wodehouse 1737	Tory; Tory
Norfolk (seat 2/2)	Sir Edmund Bacon	Tory
Northallerton (seat 1/2)	Leonard Smelt - died Replaced by William Smelt 1740	
Northallerton (seat 2/2)	Henry Peirse	
Northampton (seat 1/2)	Hon. George Compton	
Northampton (seat 2/2)	William Wilmer	
Northamptonshire (seat 1/2)	Sir Justinian Isham - died Replaced by Sir Edmund Isham 1737	
Northamptonshire (seat 2/2)	Thomas Cartwright	Tory
Northumberland (seat 1/2)	Sir William Middleton, Bt	
Northumberland (seat 2/2)	Ralph Jenison	
Norwich (seat 1/2)	Waller Bacon - died Replaced by Thomas Vere 1735	
Norwich (seat 2/2)	Horatio Walpole	
Nottingham (seat 1/2)	John Plumptre	Whig
Nottingham (seat 2/2)	Borlase Warren	Tory
Nottinghamshire (seat 1/2)	William Levinz	
Nottinghamshire (seat 2/2)	Thomas Bennett - died Replaced by John Mordaunt 1739	Whig.
== O ==
Okehampton (seat 1/2)	William Northmore - died Replaced by George Lyttelton 1735	
Okehampton (seat 2/2)	Thomas Pitt	
Old Sarum (seat 1/2)	Thomas Pitt - sat for Okehampton; Replaced by William Pitt 1735	.
Old Sarum (seat 2/2)	Robert Nedham	
Orford (seat 1/2)	Richard Powys	
Orford (seat 2/2)	Lewis Barlow - died Replaced by John Cope 1738	
Orkney and Shetland (seat 1/1)	Robert Douglas	
Oxford (seat 1/2)	Thomas Rowney, junior	
Oxford (seat 2/2)	Matthew Skinner - resigned Replaced by James Herbert 1739 - died Replaced by Philip Herbert 1740	
Oxfordshire (seat 1/2)	Sir William Stapleton - died Replaced by Sir James Dashwood 1740	
Oxfordshire (seat 2/2)	Henry Perrot - died Replaced by Viscount Quarendon 1740	
Oxford University (seat 1/2)	George Clarke - died Replaced by William Bromley 1737 - died Replaced by Edward Butler 1737	Tory; Tory; Tory
Oxford University (seat 2/2)	Viscount Cornbury	Tory
== P ==
Peeblesshire (seat 1/1)	Sir James Nasmyth 1732	
Pembroke Boroughs (seat 1/1)	William Owen	
Pembrokeshire (seat 1/1)	John Campbell	
Penryn (seat 1/2)	Sir Richard Mill	
Penryn (seat 2/2)	John Clavering	
Perth Burghs (seat 1/1)	John Drummond	
Perthshire (seat 1/1)	Lord John Murray	
Peterborough (seat 1/2)	Armstead Parker	Tory
Peterborough (seat 2/2)	Sir Edward Wortley Montagu	Whig
Petersfield (seat 1/2)	Sir William Jolliffe	
Petersfield (seat 2/2)	Edward Gibbon	
Plymouth (seat 1/2)	Arthur Stert	Whig
Plymouth (seat 2/2)	Robert Byng – took office Replaced by John Rogers 1739 -unseated on petition Replaced by Charles Vanbrugh 1740 - died Replaced by Lord Henry Beauclerk 1740	
Plympton Erle (seat 1/2)	Richard Edgcumbe - sat for Lostwithiel; Replaced by Thomas Walker 1735	Whig; Whig
Plympton Erle (seat 2/2)	Thomas Clutterbuck	
Pontefract (seat 1/2)	Sir William Lowther, 2nd Bt	
Pontefract (seat 2/2)	John Monckton	
Poole (seat 1/2)	George Trenchard	
Poole (seat 2/2)	Thomas Wyndham	
Portsmouth (seat 1/2)	Thomas Lewis - died Replaced by Charles Stewart 1737 - died Replaced by Edward Vernon 1741	
Portsmouth (seat 2/2)	Philip Cavendish	
Preston (seat 1/2)	Nicholas Fazakerley	
Preston (seat 2/2)	Sir Henry Hoghton	
== Q ==
Queenborough (seat 1/2)	Richard Evans	
Queenborough (seat 2/2)	Sir George Saunders - died Replaced by Lord Archibald Hamilton 1735	
== R ==
Radnor Boroughs	see New Radnor Boroughs	...
Radnorshire (seat 1/1)	Sir Humphrey Howorth	
Reading (seat 1/2)	Richard Potenger - died Replaced by John Blagrave 1739	
Reading (seat 2/2)	Henry Grey – died Replaced by William Strode 1740 – unseated on petition Replaced by John Dodd 1741	
Reigate (seat 1/2)	James Cocks	
Reigate (seat 2/2)	Sir Joseph Jekyll - died Replaced by John Hervey 1739	Whig.
Renfrewshire (seat 1/1)	Alexander Cunninghame	
Richmond (Yorkshire) (seat 1/2)	John Yorke	
Richmond (Yorkshire) (seat 2/2)	Sir Conyers Darcy	
Ripon (seat 1/2)	William Aislabie	Tory
Ripon (seat 2/2)	Thomas Duncombe	
Rochester (seat 1/2)	David Polhill	
Rochester (seat 2/2)	Admiral Nicholas Haddock	
Ross-shire (seat 1/1)	Hugh Rose	
Roxburghshire (seat 1/1)	John Rutherfurd	
Rutland (seat 1/2)	James Noel	
Rutland (seat 2/2)	Thomas Noel	
Rye (seat 1/2)	Phillips Gybbon	
Rye (seat 2/2)	Admiral Sir John Norris	
== S ==
St Albans (seat 1/2)	Sir Thomas Aston	
St Albans (seat 2/2)	Thomas Ashby	
St Germans (seat 1/2)	The Lord Baltimore	
St Germans (seat 2/2)	Charles Montagu	
St Ives (seat 1/2)	William Mackworth Praed	
St Ives (seat 2/2)	Major-General Sir Robert Rich	
St Mawes (seat 1/2)	Henry Vane	Whig
St Mawes (seat 2/2)	Richard Plumer	
Salisbury (seat 1/2)	Peter Bathurst	
Salisbury (seat 2/2)	Henry Hoare	
Saltash (seat 1/2)	Lord Glenorchy	
Saltash (seat 2/2)	Thomas Corbett	
Sandwich (seat 1/2)	Josiah Burchett	Whig
Sandwich (seat 2/2)	Sir George Oxenden	Whig
Scarborough (seat 1/2)	William Thompson	Whig
Scarborough (seat 2/2)	Sir William Strickland- died Replaced by Viscount Dupplin 1736 – unseated on petition Replaced by William Osbaldeston 1736	Whig..
Seaford (seat 1/2)	Sir William Gage, Bt	
Seaford (seat 2/2)	William Hay	
Selkirkshire (seat 1/1)	John Murray	
Shaftesbury (seat 1/2)	Jacob Banks - died Replaced by Philip Bennet 1738	
Shaftesbury (seat 2/2)	Philip Bennet – unseated on petition Replaced by Stephen Fox 1735	
Shrewsbury (seat 1/2)	William Kinaston	
Shrewsbury (seat 2/2)	Sir Richard Corbet	
Shropshire (seat 1/2)	Sir John Astley	
Shropshire (seat 2/2)	Corbet Kynaston - died Replaced by Richard Lyster 1740	
Shoreham	see New Shoreham	...
Somerset (seat 1/2)	Thomas Strangways Horner	Tory
Somerset (seat 2/2)	Sir William Wyndham - died Replaced by Thomas Prowse 1740	Tory.
Southampton (seat 1/2)	William Heathcote	
Southampton (seat 2/2)	John Conduitt - died Replaced by Thomas Lee Dummer 1737	
Southwark (seat 1/2)	George Heathcote	
Southwark (seat 2/2)	Thomas Inwen	
Stafford (seat 1/2)	Hon. William Chetwynd	
Stafford (seat 2/2)	Thomas Foley - died Replaced by The Viscount Chetwynd 1738	
Staffordshire (seat 1/2)	Sir Walter Wagstaffe Bagot	Tory
Staffordshire (seat 2/2)	William Leveson Gower	Tory
Stamford (seat 1/2)	William Noel	
Stamford (seat 2/2)	John Proby	
Steyning (seat 1/2)	Sir Robert Fagg - died Replaced by Hitch Younge 1740	
Steyning (seat 2/2)	Marquess of Carnarvon	
Stirling Burghs (seat 1/1)	Peter Halkett	
Stirlingshire (seat 1/1)	Sir James Campbell	
Stockbridge (seat 1/2)	Sir Humphrey Monoux	
Stockbridge (seat 2/2)	John Montagu - died Replaced by John Berkeley 1735	
Sudbury (seat 1/2)	Richard Price	
Sudbury (seat 2/2)	Edward Stephenson	
Suffolk (seat 1/2)	Sir Jermyn Davers, Bt	
Suffolk (seat 2/2)	Sir Robert Kemp - died Replaced by Sir Cordell Firebrace 1735	
Surrey (seat 1/2)	Arthur Onslow	
Surrey (seat 2/2)	Thomas Scawen	
Sussex (seat 1/2)	Henry Pelham	Whig
Sussex (seat 2/2)	James Butler; Replaced by Earl of Middlesex	Whig
Sutherland (seat 1/1)	Sir James Fergusson - resigned Replaced by James St Clair 1736	
== T ==
Tain Burghs (seat 1/1)	Sir Robert Munro, Bt	
Tamworth (seat 1/2)	Lord John Sackville	
Tamworth (seat 2/2)	George Compton - sat for Northampton; Replaced by Charles Cotes 1735	
Taunton (seat 1/2)	Henry William Berkeley Portman	Tory
Taunton (seat 2/2)	Francis Fane	Whig
Tavistock (seat 1/2)	Hon. Charles Fane	Whig
Tavistock (seat 2/2)	Sidney Meadows	
Tewkesbury (seat 1/2)	The Viscount Gage	
Tewkesbury (seat 2/2)	Robert Tracy	
Thetford (seat 1/2)	Sir Edmund Bacon - died Replaced by Lord Augustus FitzRoy 1739	
Thetford (seat 2/2)	Charles FitzRoy 1733	
Thirsk (seat 2/2)	Frederick Meinhardt Frankland	
Thirsk (seat 1/2)	Sir Thomas Frankland	
Tiverton (seat 1/2)	Arthur Arscott	
Tiverton (seat 2/2)	Dudley Ryder	
Totnes (seat 2/2)	Sir Joseph Danvers, Bt	
Totnes (seat 1/2)	Charles Wills	
Tregony (seat 1/2)	Henry Penton	
Tregony (seat 2/2)	John Goddard - died Replaced by Sir Robert Cowan 1737 - died Replaced by Joseph Gulston 1737	
Truro (seat 1/2)	Kelland Courtenay	
Truro (seat 2/2)	Robert Trefusis	
== W ==
Wallingford (seat 1/2)	Thomas Tower	Whig
Wallingford (seat 2/2)	William Hucks - died Replaced by Joseph Townsend 1740	Whig.
Wareham (seat 1/2)	Henry Drax	
Wareham (seat 2/2)	John Pitt	
Warwick (seat 1/2)	Sir William Keyt – unseated on petition Replaced by Thomas Archer	Tory.
Warwick (seat 2/2)	William Bromley – unseated on petition Replaced by Henry Archer	Tory.
Warwickshire (seat 1/2)	Sir Charles Mordaunt	Tory
Warwickshire (seat 2/2)	Edward Digby	Tory
Wells (seat 1/2)	Thomas Edwards; Replaced by William Piers 1735	Tory; Whig
Wells (seat 2/2)	George Hamilton; Replaced by George Speke 1735	
Wendover (seat 1/2)	John Boteler - election void Replaced by The Viscount Limerick 1735	
Wendover (seat 2/2)	John Hampden	
Wenlock (seat 2/2)	William Forester II	
Wenlock (seat 1/2)	Samuel Edwards - died Replaced by Brooke Forester 1739	Whig
Weobley (seat 1/2)	John Birch -annulled on death 1735; Replaced by James Cornewall 1737	
Weobley (seat 2/2)	Sir John Buckworth, Bt	
West Looe (seat 1/2)	Edward Trelawny ineligible to sit Replaced by John Owen 1735	
West Looe (seat 2/2)	Sir John Willes - resigned Replaced by John Strange 1737	
Westbury (seat 1/2)	Hon. George Evans	
Westbury (seat 2/2)	John Bance	
Westminster (seat 1/2)	Charles Wager	Whig
Westminster (seat 2/2)	William Clayton	Whig
Westmorland (seat 1/2)	Anthony Lowther	
Westmorland (seat 2/2)	Daniel Wilson	Whig
Weymouth and Melcombe Regis (seat 1/4)	George Bubb Dodington - sat for Bridgwater; Replaced by John Tucker 1735	
Weymouth and Melcombe Regis (seat 2/4)	Edward Tucker - resigned Replaced by John Olmius 1737	
Weymouth and Melcombe Regis (seat 3/4)	Thomas Pearse	
Weymouth and Melcombe Regis (seat 4/4)	George Dodington	
Whitchurch (seat 2/2)	John Selwyn, junior	Whig
Whitchurch (seat 1/2)	John Conduitt - sat for Southampton; Replaced by John Mordaunt 1735	
Wigan (seat 1/2)	Sir Roger Bradshaigh	Tory
Wigan (seat 2/2)	The Earl of Barrymore	
Wigtown Burghs (seat 1/1)	James Stewart	
Wigtownshire (seat 1/1)	William Dalrymple	
Wilton (seat 1/2)	Robert Sawyer Herbert	
Wilton (seat 2/2)	William Herbert	
Wiltshire (seat 1/2)	John Howe	Tory
Wiltshire (seat 2/2)	John Ivory-Talbot	Tory
Winchelsea (seat 1/2)	Robert Bristow II - died Replaced by Robert Bristow III 1738	
Winchelsea (seat 2/2)	Edmund Hungate Beaghan	
Winchester (seat 1/2)	George Brydges	Whig
Winchester (seat 2/2)	Paulet St John	
Windsor	see New Windsor	...
Woodstock	see New Woodstock	...
Wootton Bassett (seat 1/2)	Sir Robert Long	
Wootton Bassett (seat 2/2)	Captain Nicholas Robinson	
Worcester (seat 1/2)	Richard Lockwood	
Worcester (seat 2/2)	Samuel Sandys	Whig
Worcestershire (seat 1/2)	Sir Herbert Pakington, Bt	Tory
Worcestershire (seat 2/2)	Edmund Lechmere	
Wycombe	see Chipping Wycombe	...
== Y ==
Yarmouth (Isle of Wight) (seat 1/2)	Paul Burrard - died Replaced by Thomas Gibson 1736	
Yarmouth (Isle of Wight) (seat 2/2)	Lord Harry Powlett - sat for Hampshire; Replaced by Anthony Chute 1737	
Yarmouth (Norfolk)	see Great Yarmouth	...
York (seat 1/2)	Sir John Lister Kaye	
York (seat 2/2)	Edward Thompson	
Yorkshire (seat 1/2)	Sir Miles Stapylton, Bt	
Yorkshire (seat 2/2)	Cholmley Turner	

== By-elections ==
- List of Great Britain by-elections (1734–54)

== See also ==
- 1734 British general election
- List of parliaments of Great Britain
- Unreformed House of Commons
