= List of Great Britain by-elections (1734–1754) =

This is a list of parliamentary by-elections in Great Britain held between 1734 and 1754, with the names of the previous incumbent and the victor in the by-election.

In the absence of a comprehensive and reliable source, for party and factional alignments in this period, no attempt is made to define them in this article. The House of Commons: 1715-1754 provides some guidance to the complex and shifting political relationships, but it is significant that the compilers of that work make no attempt to produce a definitive list of each members allegiances.

== Resignations ==
See Resignation from the British House of Commons for more details.

Where the cause of by-election is given as "resignation", this indicates that the incumbent was appointed on his own request to an "office of profit under the Crown". Offices used, in this period, were the Stewards of the Chiltern Hundreds (first used in 1751), Steward of the Honour of Otford (used once in 1742) or Chief Steward and Keeper of the Courts of the Honour of Berkhamsted, Hertfordshire, Buckinghamshire, and Northampton (used once in 1752). These appointments are made as a constitutional device for leaving the House of Commons, whose Members are not permitted to resign. If the vacancy was caused by appointment to another office then this office is noted in brackets.

In addition certain offices of profit, such as cabinet positions, required the MP to seek re-election. These offices are noted separately.

== Dates ==
Until 1752 England (but not Scotland) counted its legal year as beginning on 25 March. For the purposes of this list the year is considered to have started on 1 January.

== By-elections ==
The c/u column denotes whether the by-election was a contested poll or an unopposed return. If the winner was re-elected, at the next general election and any intermediate by-elections, this is indicated by an * following the c or u. In a few cases the winner was elected at the next general election but had not been re-elected in a by-election after the one noted. In those cases no * symbol is used.

=== 8th Parliament (1735–1741) ===
Date	Constituency	c/u	Former Incumbent	Winner	Cause
17 February 1735	Amersham	c*	Thomas Lutwyche	Thomas Gore	Death
17 February 1735	Stockbridge	c	John Montagu	John Berkeley	Death
17 February 1735	Chipping Wycombe	u	Edmund Waller	Sir Charles Vernon	Chose to sit for Great Marlow
18 February 1735	Old Sarum	u*	Thomas Pitt	William Pitt	Chose to sit for Okehampton
19 February 1735	Aldborough	u*	Henry Pelham	John Jewkes	Chose to sit for Sussex
19 February 1735	Aldborough	u*	William Jessop	Andrew Wilkinson	Death
19 February 1735	Kent	u	The Viscount Vane	Sir Christopher Powell	Death
19 February 1735	Norwich	c*	Waller Bacon	Thomas Vere	Death
20 February 1735	Ashburton	u	Sir William Yonge	Thomas Bladen	Chose to sit for Honiton
20 February 1735	Bewdley	u	William Bowles	Phineas Bowles	Chose to sit for Bridport
20 February 1735	East Looe	u	Edward Trelawny	Samuel Holden	Ineligible to sit (Commissioner of Customs in Scotland)
20 February 1735	West Looe	u	Edward Trelawny	John Owen	Ineligible to sit (Commissioner of Customs in Scotland)
21 February 1735	Plympton Erle	u	Richard Edgcumbe	Thomas Walker	Chose to sit for Lostwithiel
22 February 1735	Queenborough	u	Sir George Saunders	Lord Archibald Hamilton	Death
26 February 1735	Bedfordshire	u*	John Spencer	Sir Roger Burgoyne	Chose to sit for New Woodstock
27 February 1735	Aldeburgh	u	George Purvis	George Purvis	Commissioner of the Navy
28 February 1735	Hindon	u*	Stephen Fox	Henry Fox	Chose to sit for Shaftesbury
28 February 1735	Weymouth and Melcombe Regis	c*	George Bubb Dodington	John Tucker	Chose to sit for Bridgwater
5 March 1735	Suffolk	u*	Sir Robert Kemp	Sir Cordell Firebrace	Death
6 March 1735	Monmouthshire	u*	John Hanbury	Charles Hanbury Williams	Death
7 March 1735	Lanarkshire	u*	Lord William Hamilton	Sir James Hamilton	Death
11 March 1735	Exeter	u*	John King	Sir Henry Northcote	Succeeded to a peerage
17 March 1735	Nairnshire	u	John Campbell	Alexander Brodie	Chose to sit for Pembrokeshire
20 March 1735	Colchester	c	Isaac Lemyng Rebow	Jacob Houblon	Death
28 March 1735	Okehampton	u*	William Northmore	George Lyttelton	Death
31 March 1735	Lostwithiel	u	Philip Lloyd	Matthew Ducie Moreton	Death
3 April 1735	Tamworth	c(*)	George Compton	Charles Cotes	Chose to sit for Northampton
7 April 1735	Bridgwater	u	Thomas Palmer	Charles Wyndham	Death
9 April 1735	Hastings	u	Sir William Ashburnham	Sir William Ashburnham	Receiver of Fines in the Alienation Office
14 April 1735	Cirencester	u*	William Wodehouse	Henry Bathurst	Death
19 April 1735	Whitchurch	u*	John Conduitt	John Mordaunt	Chose to sit for Southampton
22 April 1735	Wendover	c	John Boteler	The Viscount Limerick	Void Election
1 May 1735	Forfarshire	c*	Thomas Lyon	William Maule	Became a Scottish Peer
5 May 1735	Gatton	u*	Paul Docminique	Charles Docminique	Death
9 May 1735	Dumfries Burghs	c	Charles Erskine	William Kirkpatrick	Chose to sit for Dumfriesshire (Two MPs elected due to a Double Return)
9 May 1735	Dumfries Burghs	c	Charles Erskine	Sir John Douglas	Chose to sit for Dumfriesshire (Two MPs elected due to a Double Return)
9 May 1735	Dumfries Burghs	c	William Kirkpatrick	William Kirkpatrick	Kirkpatrick declared elected 13 February 1736
9 May 1735	Dumfries Burghs	c	Sir John Douglas	William Kirkpatrick	Kirkpatrick declared elected 13 February 1736
17 May 1735	Honiton	u*	Sir William Yonge	Sir William Yonge	Secretary at War
20 May 1735	Horsham	u	Henry Ingram	Henry Ingram	Commissary General of Stores for Minorca
20 May 1735	Wendover	u*	John Hampden	John Hampden	Commissary General for Gibraltar
21 May 1735	Reading	u	Richard Potenger	Richard Potenger	Puisne Justice of Chester
27 May 1735	St Mawes	u	Richard Plumer	Richard Plumer	Lord of Trade
23 January 1736	Yarmouth	u*	Paul Burrard	Thomas Gibson	Death
28 January 1736	Scarborough	c(*)	Sir William Strickland	Viscount Dupplin	Death
28 January 1736	Scarborough	c(*)	Viscount Dupplin	William Osbaldeston	By-election results reversed on petition 21 April 1736
2 February 1736	Midhurst	u	Bulstrode Peachey Knight	Sir Henry Peachey	Death
3 February 1736	Devon	u	Sir William Courtenay	John Bampfylde	Death
10 February 1736	New Romney	u	David Papillon	Sir Robert Austen	Chose to sit for Dover
17 February 1736	Newport (I.o.W.)	u*	William Fortescue	The Viscount Boyne	Resignation (Baron of the Exchequer)
24 February 1736	Dorchester	u*	John Browne	John Browne	King's Counsel
13 March 1736	Derby	u*	Charles Stanhope	John Stanhope	Death
19 March 1736	Lostwithiel	u*	Matthew Ducie Moreton	John Crosse	Succeeded to a peerage
5 April 1736	Hythe	u*	Hercules Baker	Hercules Baker	Treasurer of Greenwich Hospital
22 April 1736	Hertfordshire	c	Sir Thomas Saunders Sebright	Charles Caesar	Death
27 April 1736	Argyllshire	u*	Sir James Campbell	Charles Campbell	Chose to sit for Stirlingshire
4 May 1736	Lancashire	u	Sir Edward Stanley	Peter Bold	Succeeded to a peerage
6 May 1736	Sutherland	u*	Sir James Fergusson	James St Clair	Resignation (Senator of the College of Justice)
28 May 1736	Droitwich	u*	Thomas Winnington	Thomas Winnington	Junior Lord of the Treasury
22 June 1736	Pembrokeshire	u*	John Campbell	John Campbell	Lord of the Admiralty
7 February 1737	Horsham	u	Henry Ingram	Charles Ingram	Became a Scottish Peer
9 February 1737	Oxford University	c	George Clarke	William Bromley	Death
9 February 1737	Tregony	u	John Goddard	Sir Robert Cowan	Death
9 February 1737	West Looe	u	Sir John Willes	John Strange	Resignation (Chief Justice of the Common Pleas)
10 February 1737	Cambridge	c	Thomas Bacon	Gilbert Affleck	Death
10 February 1737	Portsmouth	u	Thomas Lewis	Charles Stewart	Death
10 February 1737	Tiverton	u*	Dudley Ryder	Dudley Ryder	Attorney General for England and Wales
15 February 1737	Coventry	c*	Sir Adolphus Oughton	John Neale	Death
28 February 1737	Marlborough	c*	Edward Lisle	John Crawley	Chose to sit for Hampshire
2 March 1737	Tregony	u	Sir Robert Cowan	Joseph Gulston	Death
8 March 1737	Yarmouth	u	Lord Harry Powlett	Anthony Chute	Chose to sit for Hampshire
9 March 1737	Glamorganshire	u*	William Talbot	Bussy Mansel	Succeeded to a peerage
10 March 1737	Weymouth and Melcombe Regis	u	Edward Tucker	John Olmius	Resignation (Supervisor of the Portland Quarries)
23 March 1737	Norfolk	u*	William Wodehouse	Armine Wodehouse	Death
31 March 1737	Northamptonshire	u*	Sir Justinian Isham	Sir Edmund Isham	Death
31 March 1737	Oxford University	c*	William Bromley	Edward Butler	Death
12 April 1737	Coventry	u*	John Neale	Earl of Euston	Previous By-election voided 22 March 1737
12 April 1737	Coventry	u	John Bird	John Neale	Resignation (Commissioner of Stamp Duties)
16 April 1737	Castle Rising	u*	Thomas Hanmer	Viscount Andover	Death
27 April 1737	Leicester	c*	Sir George Beaumont	James Wigley	Death
24 May 1737	Bossiney	c	Townshend Andrews	Peregrine Poulett	Death
10 June 1737	Southampton	c	John Conduitt	Thomas Lee Dummer	Death
22 June 1737	Chippenham	c*	Rogers Holland	Edward Bayntun Rolt	Chief Justice of the North Wales Circuit
22 June 1737	Hindon	u	Henry Fox	Henry Fox	Surveyor-General of Works
25 June 1737	Dorchester	u	William Chapple	Robert Browne	Resignation (Puisne Justice of the King's Bench)
27 June 1737	Newport (I.o.W.)	u	The Viscount Boyne	The Viscount Boyne	Irish Revenue Commissioner
27 June 1737	Whitchurch	u	John Mordaunt	John Mordaunt	Equerry to the King
28 June 1737	Malmesbury	u*	Giles Earle	Giles Earle	Junior Lord of the Treasury
28 June 1737	Minehead	c	Alexander Luttrell	Sir William Codrington	Death
30 June 1737	Wilton	u*	Robert Sawyer Herbert	Robert Sawyer Herbert	Lord of Trade
1 July 1737	Hythe	u*	William Glanville	William Glanville	Irish Revenue Commissioner
4 July 1737	Fowey	u*	John Hedges	William Wardour	Death
7 July 1737	Knaresborough	u*	Richard Arundell	Richard Arundell	Master of the Mint
7 July 1737	Northumberland	u*	Ralph Jenison	Ralph Jenison	Master of the Buckhounds
21 July 1737	Inverness Burghs	u	Duncan Forbes	Duncan Urquhart	Resignation (Lord President of the Court of Session)
4 August 1737	Dumfriesshire	u	Charles Erskine	Charles Erskine	Lord Advocate
4 August 1737	Edinburghshire	c*	Robert Dundas	Sir Charles Gilmour	Resignation (Senator of the College of Justice)
30 January 1738	Winchelsea	u	Robert Bristow	Robert Bristow	Death
31 January 1738	Newark-on-Trent	u*	Richard Sutton	Lord William Manners	Death
31 January 1738	Stafford	u*	Thomas Foley	The Viscount Chetwynd	Death
1 February 1738	Orford	u	Lewis Barlow	John Cope	Death
1 February 1738	Ripon	u*	William Aislabie	William Aislabie	Auditor of the Imprest
2 February 1738	Beverley	c*	Sir Charles Hotham	Charles Pelham	Death
3 February 1738	Midhurst	u*	Sir Henry Peachey	Sir John Peachey	Death
9 February 1738	Cockermouth	c	Sir Wilfrid Lawson	Eldred Curwen	Death
13 February 1738	Lewes	u*	Thomas Pelham	John Morley Trevor	Death
13 February 1738	Stamford	u*	William Noel	William Noel	King's Counsel
14 February 1738	Great Yarmouth	u*	William Townshend	Roger Townshend	Death
16 February 1738	Leicestershire	u	Ambrose Phillipps	Lord Grey	Death
21 February 1738	Dunwich	u	Sir Orlando Bridgeman	William Morden	Resignation (Governor of Barbados)
9 March 1738	Shaftesbury	c	Jacob Banks	Philip Bennet	Death
10 March 1738	New Windsor	c	Lord Vere Beauclerk	Lord Vere Beauclerk	Naval Lord (Two MPs elected due to a Double Return)
10 March 1738	New Windsor	c	Lord Vere Beauclerk	Richard Oldfield	Naval Lord (Two MPs elected due to a Double Return)
10 March 1738	New Windsor	c	Lord Vere Beauclerk	Lord Vere Beauclerk	Beauclerk declared elected 27 March 1738
10 March 1738	New Windsor	c	Richard Oldfield	Lord Vere Beauclerk	Beauclerk declared elected 27 March 1738
5 April 1738	Great Bedwyn	c	Robert Murray	Edward Popham	Death
16 May 1738	Gatton	u*	William Newland	George Newland	Death
17 May 1738	Kingston upon Hull	u*	George Crowle	George Crowle	Commissioner of the Navy
18 May 1738	Morpeth	u	Viscount Morpeth	Henry Furnese	Succeeded to a peerage
22 May 1738	Seaford	u*	William Hay	William Hay	Victualling Commissioner
25 May 1738	Dartmouth	u*	Walter Carey	Walter Carey	Second Clerk Comptroller of the Green Cloth
29 May 1738	Helston	u	John Harris	John Harris	Paymaster of the Board of Works
2 June 1738	Bury St Edmunds	u*	Thomas Hervey	Thomas Hervey	Surveyor of the King's Gardens
19 June 1738	Dumfries Burghs	u	William Kirkpatrick	Sir Robert Laurie	Resignation (Principal Clerk of Session)
8 February 1739	Oxford	u	Matthew Skinner	James Herbert	Resignation (Chief Justice of Chester)
9 February 1739	Grampound	u	Philip Hawkins	Thomas Trefusis	Death
9 February 1739	King's Lynn	u*	Sir Charles Turner	Sir John Turner	Death
9 February 1739	Minehead	c*	Sir William Codrington	Thomas Carew	Death
10 February 1739	Thetford	u*	Sir Edmund Bacon	Lord Augustus FitzRoy	Death
14 February 1739	Nottinghamshire	u*	Thomas Bennet	John Mordaunt	Death
14 February 1739	Wenlock	u*	Samuel Edwards	Brooke Forester	Death
16 February 1739	Cardiff Boroughs	u*	Herbert Windsor	Herbert Mackworth	Succeeded to a peerage
16 February 1739	Reigate	u	Sir Joseph Jekyll	John Hervey	Death
16 April 1739	Ashburton	u	Roger Tuckfield	Joseph Taylor	Death
20 April 1739	Beaumaris	u*	The Viscount Bulkeley	The Viscount Bulkeley	Death
28 May 1739	New Shoreham	c	John Phillipson	John Phillipson	Commissioner of the Navy
8 June 1739	Aberdeen Burghs	u*	John Middleton	John Maule	Death
13 June 1739	Plymouth	c	Robert Byng	John Rogers	Resignation (Governor of Barbados)
13 June 1739	Plymouth	c	John Rogers	Charles Vanbrugh	By-election results reversed on petition 17 January 1740
21 November 1739	Cricklade	u(*)	William Gore	Charles Gore	Death
23 November 1739	Arundel	u*	John Lumley	Garton Orme	Death
24 November 1739	Hedon	u	Sir Francis Boynton	Harry Pulteney	Death
27 November 1739	Huntingdonshire	c	Lord Robert Montagu	Charles Clarke	Succeeded to a peerage
4 December 1739	Berkshire	u*	William Archer	Peniston Powney	Death
6 December 1739	Reading	c*	Richard Potenger	John Blagrave	Death
12 December 1739	Bristol	c*	Thomas Coster	Edward Southwell	Death
20 December 1739	Leicestershire	u	Lord Grey	Lord Guernsey	Succeeded to a peerage
2 January 1740	Caernarvonshire	u	John Griffith	John Wynn	Death
3 January 1740	Monmouthshire	u*	Charles Hanbury Williams	Charles Hanbury Williams	Paymaster of the Marines
14 January 1740	Maldon	u	Henry Parsons	Benjamin Keene	Death
15 January 1740	Maidstone	c	John Finch	Robert Fairfax	Death
22 January 1740	Newport (Cornwall)	u*	Thomas Herbert	Nicholas Herbert	Death
30 January 1740	Oxfordshire	u*	Sir William Stapleton	Sir James Dashwood	Death
20 February 1740	Lincolnshire	u*	Sir Thomas Lumley Saunderson	Thomas Whichcot	Succeeded to a peerage
22 February 1740	Bere Alston	u*	Sir Francis Henry Drake	Samuel Heathcote	Death
26 February 1740	Devizes	u*	Sir Joseph Eyles	John Garth	Death
27 February 1740	Oxfordshire	u*	Henry Perrot	Viscount Quarendon	Death
13 March 1740	Berwick-upon-Tweed	u*	Lord Polwarth	The Viscount Barrington	Became a Scottish Peer
25 March 1740	Liskeard	u*	George Dennis	Charles Trelawny	Death
3 April 1740	Christchurch	c*	Joseph Hinxman	Charles Armand Powlett	Death
10 April 1740	Brecon	c*	John Talbot	John Talbot	Puisne Justice of Chester
28 April 1740	New Windsor	u*	Lord Sidney Beauclerk	Lord Sidney Beauclerk	Vice-Chamberlain of the Household
2 May 1740	Wilton	u*	William Herbert	William Herbert	Groom of the Bedchamber
15 May 1740	Middlesex	c*	Sir Francis Child	Sir Hugh Smithson	Death
24 November 1740	Bedford	u*	Sir Jeremy Sambrooke	Sir Boteler Chernock	Death
24 November 1740	Guildford	u*	Richard Onslow	Denzil Onslow	Succeeded to a peerage
24 November 1740	New Shoreham	u	Thomas Frederick	John Frederick	Death
25 November 1740	Banbury	u*	William Knollys	William Moore	Death
26 November 1740	Newcastle-under-Lyme	u*	John Lawton	Randle Wilbraham	Death
26 November 1740	Plymouth	u*	Charles Vanbrugh	Lord Henry Beauclerk	Death
26 November 1740	Reading	c(*)	Henry Grey	William Strode	Death
26 November 1740	Reading	c(*)	William Strode	John Dodd	By-election results reversed on petition 17 February 1741
26 November 1740	Somerset	u*	Sir William Wyndham	Thomas Prowse	Death
26 November 1740	Steyning	c*	Sir Robert Fagg	Hitch Younge	Death
27 November 1740	Berwick-upon-Tweed	u*	George Liddell	Thomas Watson	Death
27 November 1740	Dartmouth	u*	George Treby	George Treby	Junior Lord of the Treasury
27 November 1740	East Looe	u*	Samuel Holden	Henry Legge	Death
1 December 1740	Barnstaple	c	Sir John Chichester	John Basset	Death
1 December 1740	Northallerton	u*	Leonard Smelt	William Smelt	Death
3 December 1740	Oxford	u*	James Herbert	Philip Herbert	Death
11 December 1740	Shropshire	u*	Corbet Kynaston	Richard Lyster	Death
12 December 1740	Montgomeryshire	u	Price Devereux	Robert Williams	Succeeded to a peerage
22 December 1740	Wallingford	c	William Hucks	Joseph Townsend	Death
24 December 1740	Denbighshire	u(*)	Sir Watkin Williams Wynn	Sir Watkin Williams Wynn	Steward of Bromfield and Yale
27 December 1740	Malmesbury	u*	William Rawlinson Earle	William Rawlinson Earle	Clerk of the Ordnance
21 February 1741	Portsmouth	u	Charles Stewart	Edward Vernon	Death
30 March 1741	Aldeburgh	u	George Purvis	Francis Gashry	Death

=== 9th Parliament (1741–1747) ===
Date	Constituency	c/u	Former Incumbent	Winner	Cause
28 December 1741	Higham Ferrers	u	Henry Finch	Henry Seymour Conway	Chose to sit for Malton
29 December 1741	Huntingdon	u	Wills Hill	Albert Nesbitt	Chose to sit for Warwick
29 December 1741	Thetford	u*	Lord Augustus FitzRoy	Lord Henry Beauclerk	Death
30 December 1741	Malton	u*	Lord James Cavendish	John Mostyn	Death
31 December 1741	Lymington	u*	Lord Nassau Powlett	Charles Powlett	Death
31 December 1741	Westminster	u	Sir Charles Wager	Charles Edwin	Void Election
31 December 1741	Westminster	u	The Lord Sundon	Lord Perceval	Void Election
1 January 1742	Appleby	u	George Bubb Dodington	Sir Charles Wyndham	Chose to sit for Bridgwater
2 January 1742	Whitchurch	u	John Wallop	William Sloper	Chose to sit for Andover
4 January 1742	Downton	u	John Verney	Joseph Windham Ashe	Death
4 January 1742	Droitwich	u	Thomas Winnington	Lord George Bentinck	Chose to sit for Worcester
5 January 1742	Old Sarum	u*	George Lyttelton	James Grenville	Chose to sit for Okehampton
6 January 1742	Herefordshire	u	Edward Harley	Thomas Foley	Succeeded to a peerage
14 January 1742	Sussex	u*	James Butler	Earl of Middlesex	Death
21 January 1742	Yorkshire	c	Viscount Morpeth	Charles Cholmley Turner	Death
23 January 1742	East Grinstead	u	Earl of Middlesex	John Butler	High Steward of the Honour of Otford
25 January 1742	Totnes	u*	Sir Charles Wills	Sir John Strange	Death
28 January 1742	Tavistock	u	Lord Sherard Manners	The Viscount Limerick	Death
28 January 1742	Tregony	u	Thomas Watts	George Cooke	Death
2 February 1742	Milborne Port	u(*)	Thomas Medlycott	Michael Harvey	Resignation (Commissioner of Hawkers and Pedlars)
5 February 1742	Argyllshire	u	Charles Campbell	James Stuart Mackenzie	Death
18 February 1742	Roxburghshire	u	John Rutherfurd	William Douglas	Resignation (Commission in the Army)
23 February 1742	Rye	u*	Phillips Gybbon	Phillips Gybbon	Junior Lord of the Treasury
24 February 1742	Evesham	u*	Sir John Rushout	Sir John Rushout	Junior Lord of the Treasury
24 February 1742	King's Lynn	u	Sir Robert Walpole	Edward Bacon	Elevated to the peerage
24 February 1742	Northampton	u	George Compton	George Compton	Junior Lord of the Treasury
8 March 1742	Derby	c*	Lord James Cavendish	Viscount Duncannon	Resignation (Auditor of Foreign Accounts or Imposts in Ireland)
9 March 1742	Worcester	u	Samuel Sandys	Samuel Sandys	Chancellor of the Exchequer
19 March 1742	Minehead	u	Francis Whitworth	John Periam	Death
20 March 1742	Lewes	u	John Morley Trevor	John Morley Trevor	Lord of the Admiralty
22 March 1742	Brackley	u*	George Lee	Sewallis Shirley	Lord of the Admiralty
23 March 1742	Portsmouth	u	Philip Cavendish	Philip Cavendish	Naval Lord
24 March 1742	Surrey	c*	The Lord Baltimore	The Lord Baltimore	Lord of the Admiralty
27 March 1742	Dartmouth	u	George Treby	Lord Archibald Hamilton	Death
29 March 1742	Leominster	c	John Caswall	Robert Harley	Death
2 April 1742	Bridport	u	William Bowles	Viscount Deerhurst	Chose to sit for Bewdley
2 April 1742	Montgomeryshire	u	Sir Watkin Williams Wynn	Robert Williams	Chose to sit for Denbighshire
2 April 1742	Tain Burghs	c	Charles Erskine	Robert Craigie	Void Election
6 April 1742	Hastings	u*	Andrew Stone	Andrew Stone	Secretary of Barbados
8 April 1742	Andover	u*	John Pollen	John Pollen	Justice of Carmarthen
23 April 1742	Durham City	u*	John Shafto	John Tempest	Death
3 May 1742	Peterborough	u	The Earl Fitzwilliam	Armstead Parker	Became a British Peer
3 May 1742	Plympton Erle	u	Richard Edgcumbe	The Lord Sundon	Elevated to the peerage
5 May 1742	Chester	u*	Sir Charles Bunbury	Philip Henry Warburton	Death
15 May 1742	Plympton Erle	u	Thomas Clutterbuck	Thomas Clutterbuck	Treasurer of the Navy
21 June 1742	Truro	u*	James Hammond	Edward Boscawen	Death
1 July 1742	Shaftesbury	u*	Charles Ewer	George Pitt	Death
13 July 1742	City of London	u*	Sir Robert Godschall	William Calvert	Death
21 July 1742	York	u*	Edward Thompson	George Fox	Death
22 July 1742	Christchurch	u*	Edward Hooper	Edward Hooper	Paymaster of Pensions
22 July 1742	Dorchester	u*	Nathaniel Gundry	Nathaniel Gundry	King's Counsel
22 July 1742	Grampound	u	Daniel Boone	Daniel Boone	Muster-Master General
23 July 1742	Cambridge University	u*	Edward Finch	Edward Finch	Groom of the Bedchamber
23 July 1742	Devizes	u	Francis Eyles	George Lee	Resignation (Superintendent of the King’s Foundries)
23 July 1742	Orford	u*	Henry Legge	Henry Legge	Surveyor General of Woods, Forests, Parks, and Chases
27 July 1742	Cockermouth	u*	William Finch	William Finch	Vice-Chamberlain of the Household
28 July 1742	Ripon	u	Henry Vane	Henry Vane	Vice-Treasurer of Ireland
5 August 1742	Middlesex	u	William Pulteney	Sir Roger Newdigate	Elevated to the peerage
10 August 1742	Edinburghshire	u*	Sir Charles Gilmour	Sir Charles Gilmour	Paymaster of the Works
24 November 1742	Bristol	u*	Sir Abraham Elton	Robert Hoblyn	Death
29 November 1742	Boroughbridge	u*	James Tyrrell	William Murray	Death
4 December 1742	Plympton Erle	u*	Thomas Clutterbuck	Richard Edgcumbe	Death
23 December 1742	Renfrewshire	c*	Alexander Cuninghame	William Mure	Death
27 December 1742	West Looe	u	Sir Charles Wager	Sir Charles Wager	Treasurer of the Navy
30 December 1742	Cromartyshire	u	Sir William Gordon	Sir John Gordon	Death
31 December 1742	Kirkcudbrightshire	u	Basil Hamilton	John Maxwell	Death
20 January 1743	Dumfries Burghs	u*	Lord John Johnstone	Sir James Johnstone	Death
20 January 1743	Perth Burghs	u*	John Drummond	Thomas Leslie	Death
31 January 1743	Whitchurch	u	William Sloper	Charles Clarke	Death
11 February 1743	St Albans	c	Thomas Ashby	Hans Stanley	Death
18 February 1743	Whitchurch	u	Charles Clarke	Thomas Wentworth	Resignation (Baron of the Exchequer)
22 February 1743	Penryn	u*	Edward Vernon	George Boscawen	Chose to sit for Ipswich
22 February 1743	Rochester	c*	Edward Vernon	David Polhill	Chose to sit for Ipswich
23 March 1743	Oxfordshire	u*	Viscount Quarendon	Norris Bertie	Succeeded to a peerage
23 March 1743	Suffolk	u*	Sir Jermyn Davers	John Affleck	Death
18 April 1743	Grantham	u*	Sir Michael Newton	Sir John Cust	Death
21 April 1743	Saltash	u	John Clevland	Stamp Brooksbank	Resignation (Commissioner of the Navy)
27 April 1743	Calne	u*	William Elliot	William Elliot	Equerry to the King
13 May 1743	Linlithgowshire	c*	George Dundas	Charles Hope Weir	Master of Work to the Crown of Scotland
30 June 1743	Southwark	c*	Thomas Inwen	Alexander Hume	Death
6 December 1743	Lewes	u	Thomas Pelham	Sir John Shelley	Death
6 December 1743	Lewes	u*	John Morley Trevor	Sir Francis Poole	Death
8 December 1743	Thetford	u*	Charles Fitzroy	Charles FitzRoy	Groom Porter
9 December 1743	Aldeburgh	u*	John Jewkes	Nathaniel Newnham	Death
9 December 1743	Eye	u*	Stephen Cornwallis	Edward Cornwallis	Death
10 December 1743	West Looe	u*	Sir Charles Wager	John Frederick	Death
13 December 1743	Harwich	u*	John Phillipson	John Phillipson	Lord of the Admiralty
13 December 1743	Haverfordwest	u	Sir Erasmus Philipps	George Barlow	Death
14 December 1743	Portsmouth	u	Philip Cavendish	Sir Charles Hardy	Death
15 December 1743	Newton	u*	William Shippen	Peter Legh	Death
15 December 1743	Sussex	u*	Henry Pelham	Henry Pelham	First Lord of the Treasury
20 December 1743	Exeter	u	Sir Henry Northcote	Sir Richard Bampfylde	Death
26 December 1743	New Windsor	u*	Henry Fox	Henry Fox	Junior Lord of the Treasury
27 December 1743	Guildford	u	Denzil Onslow	Denzil Onslow	Paymaster of the Works
27 December 1743	Worcester	u	Thomas Winnington	Thomas Winnington	Paymaster of the Forces
28 December 1743	Evesham	u*	Sir John Rushout	Sir John Rushout	Treasurer of the Navy
29 December 1743	Malton	u*	Henry Finch	Henry Finch	Surveyor of the King's Works
30 December 1743	Ludlow	u*	Henry Arthur Herbert	Richard Herbert	Elevated to the peerage
30 December 1743	Truro	u	Charles Hamilton	Charles Hamilton	Receiver General of the Revenues of Minorca
10 January 1744	Worcester	c	Samuel Sandys	Sir Henry Harpur	Elevated to the peerage
12 January 1744	Sussex	u	Earl of Middlesex	Earl of Middlesex	Junior Lord of the Treasury
13 January 1744	Edinburghshire	c*	Sir Charles Gilmour	Sir Charles Gilmour	Lord of Trade
26 March 1744	Glasgow Burghs	u*	Neil Buchanan	John Campbell	Death
4 April 1744	Cornwall	u*	Sir William Carew	Sir Coventry Carew	Death
13 April 1744	Northampton	u	William Wilmer	George Montagu	Death
23 April 1744	Midhurst	u	Sir John Peachey	Sir John Peachey	Death
2 May 1744	Kingston upon Hull	u	William Carter	Harry Pulteney	Death
9 May 1744	Seaford	u	Sir William Hall Gage	William Gage	Death
3 December 1744	Hythe	u*	Hercules Baker	Thomas Hales	Death
3 December 1744	Great Marlow	c*	Sir Thomas Hoby	William Ockenden	Death
3 December 1744	New Windsor	u*	Lord Sidney Beauclerk	Lord George Beauclerk	Death
5 December 1744	Bridport	u	Viscount Deerhurst	Viscount Deerhurst	Death
5 December 1744	New Woodstock	u	John Spencer	John Spencer	Ranger of Windsor Great Park
6 December 1744	Bishop's Castle	u	Marquess of Carnarvon	Granville Leveson Gower	Succeeded to a peerage
7 December 1744	Corfe Castle	u	John Bond	Thomas Erle Drax	Death
7 December 1744	Wenlock	u*	Sir Brian Broughton Delves	Isaac Hawkins Browne	Death
8 December 1744	Hedon	c*	The Earl of Mountrath	George Anson	Death
8 December 1744	Scarborough	c*	William Thompson	Edwin Lascelles	Death
12 December 1744	Cornwall	u*	Sir John St Aubyn	Sir John Molesworth	Death
14 December 1744	Yarmouth	u	Thomas Gibson	Robert Carteret	Death
20 December 1744	Kincardineshire	c*	Sir James Carnegie	Sir James Carnegie	Accepted a Commission in the Army
20 December 1744	Linlithgowshire	u*	Charles Hope Weir	Charles Hope Weir	Commissary General of the Musters in Scotland
28 December 1744	Buckingham	u*	George Grenville	George Grenville	Lord of the Admiralty
28 December 1744	Cambridge	u	James Martin	Christopher Jeffreason	Death
28 December 1744	Portsmouth	u*	Sir Charles Hardy	Isaac Townsend	Death
29 December 1744	Marlborough	u*	Sir John Hynde Cotton	Sir John Hynde Cotton	Treasurer of the Chamber
29 December 1744	Chipping Wycombe	u*	Edmund Waller	Edmund Waller	Cofferer of the Household
31 December 1744	Bridgwater	u*	George Bubb Dodington	George Bubb Dodington	Treasurer of the Navy
31 December 1744	Plymouth	u*	Lord Vere Beauclerk	Lord Vere Beauclerk	Naval Lord
31 December 1744	Stafford	u*	William Chetwynd	William Chetwynd	Master of the Mint
1 January 1745	Wareham	u	John Pitt	John Pitt	Lord of Trade
2 January 1745	Glamorganshire	u	Bussy Mansel	Thomas Mathews	Succeeded to a peerage
2 January 1745	West Looe	u	Benjamin Keene	Benjamin Keene	Paymaster of Pensions
3 January 1745	Carmarthen	u	Sir John Philipps	Sir John Philipps	Lord of Trade
4 January 1745	Knaresborough	u*	Richard Arundell	Richard Arundell	Junior Lord of the Treasury
4 January 1745	Okehampton	u*	George Lyttelton	George Lyttelton	Junior Lord of the Treasury
8 January 1745	Cumberland	u*	Sir Joseph Pennington	Sir John Pennington	Death
15 January 1745	Bletchingley	u*	Sir William Clayton	William Clayton	Death
21 January 1745	Hedon	u	George Anson	George Anson	Naval Lord
12 February 1745	Dysart Burghs	u	James Oswald	James Oswald	Commissioner of the Navy
14 March 1745	Monmouth	u	Lord Charles Noel Somerset	Sir Charles Kemys Tynte	Succeeded to a peerage
16 April 1745	Harwich	u*	John Phillipson	John Phillipson	Surveyor General of Woods and Forests North and South of Trent
16 April 1745	Taunton	u	John Buck	Percy Wyndham O'Brien	Death
19 April 1745	Orford	u*	Henry Legge	Henry Legge	Lord of the Admiralty
25 April 1745	Lancaster	c*	Sir Thomas Lowther	Francis Reynolds	Death
8 May 1745	Newcastle-under-Lyme	u*	Baptist Leveson Gower	Baptist Leveson Gower	Lord of Trade
14 May 1745	Mitchell	u	Edward Clive	Richard Lloyd	Resignation (Baron of the Exchequer)
16 May 1745	Northallerton	u*	William Smelt	Henry Lascelles	Resignation (Receiver General of Casual Revenue in Barbados)
24 October 1745	Castle Rising	u	Charles Churchill	Richard Rigby	Death
25 October 1745	Gatton	u*	Charles Docminique	Paul Humphrey	Death
29 October 1745	Clitheroe	u*	Thomas Lister	Thomas Lister, jun.	Death
30 October 1745	Ludlow	u*	Richard Herbert	Richard Herbert	Accepted a Commission in the Army
31 October 1745	Grantham	u*	Marquess of Granby	Marquess of Granby	Accepted a Commission in the Army
9 November 1745	Huntingdonshire	u	William Mitchell	William Montagu	Death
9 November 1745	Mitchell	u	John Ord	Sir Edward Pickering	Death
12 November 1745	Oxford University	u*	Edward Butler	Peregrine Palmer	Death
21 November 1745	Carmarthenshire	u*	Sir Nicholas Williams	John Vaughan	Death
23 January 1746	Canterbury	u	Thomas Watson	Sir Thomas Hales	Succeeded to a peerage
28 January 1746	Cirencester	u*	Henry Bathurst	Henry Bathurst	King's Counsel
31 January 1746	Orford	u	Viscount Glenorchy	John Bateman	Resignation (Master of the Jewel Office)
3 February 1746	Malton	u*	John Mostyn	John Mostyn	Groom of the Bedchamber
26 February 1746	Amersham	u*	Thomas Gore	William Drake	Muster-Master General
26 February 1746	Old Sarum	u	James Grenville	James Grenville	Lord of Trade
26 February 1746	Old Sarum	u*	William Pitt	William Pitt	Vice-Treasurer of Ireland
1 March 1746	Berwick-upon-Tweed	u*	The Viscount Barrington	The Viscount Barrington	Lord of the Admiralty
3 March 1746	Portsmouth	u*	Martin Bladen	Thomas Gore	Death
20 March 1746	Cardigan Boroughs	c*	Thomas Pryse	John Symmons	Death
15 April 1746	Devon	u	Theophilus Fortescue	Sir Thomas Dyke Acland	Death
21 April 1746	New Shoreham	u*	Charles Frederick	Charles Frederick	Clerk of the Deliveries of the Ordnance
22 April 1746	Boroughbridge	u*	George Gregory	Earl of Dalkeith	Death
23 April 1746	Aldeburgh	u*	Andrew Wilkinson	Andrew Wilkinson	Storekeeper of the Ordnance
12 May 1746	Old Sarum	u	William Pitt	William Pitt	Paymaster of the Forces
13 May 1746	Worcester	u*	Thomas Winnington	Thomas Vernon	Death
19 May 1746	Honiton	u*	Sir William Yonge	Sir William Yonge	Vice-Treasurer of Ireland
31 May 1746	New Windsor	u*	Henry Fox	Henry Fox	Secretary at War
30 June 1746	Derby	u*	Viscount Duncannon	Viscount Duncannon	Lord of the Admiralty
30 June 1746	Orford	u*	Henry Legge	Henry Legge	Junior Lord of the Treasury
4 July 1746	Knaresborough	u*	Richard Arundell	Richard Arundell	Treasurer of the Chamber
4 July 1746	New Woodstock	u	John Spencer	John Trevor	Death
5 July 1746	Bossiney	u	Richard Liddell	William Breton	Death
22 July 1746	Pembrokeshire	u	John Campbell	John Campbell	Junior Lord of the Treasury
30 July 1746	Fowey	u*	William Wardour	George Edgcumbe	Death
19 August 1746	Chichester	u*	James Brudenell	Viscount Bury	Death
24 November 1746	Cambridge	u	Viscount Dupplin	Viscount Dupplin	Lord of Trade
24 November 1746	Petersfield	u	Francis Fane	Francis Fane	Lord of Trade
24 November 1746	Rochester	u*	Nicholas Haddock	Sir Chaloner Ogle	Death
26 November 1746	Banbury	u*	William Moore	John Willes	Death
26 November 1746	Berkshire	u*	Winchcombe Howard Packer	Henry Pye	Death
26 November 1746	Carlisle	c*	John Hylton	John Stanwix	Death
28 November 1746	Downton	u*	Joseph Windham Ashe	George Proctor	Death
29 November 1746	Hedon	c(*)	George Berkeley	Samuel Gumley	Death
29 November 1746	Hedon	c(*)	Samuel Gumley	Luke Robinson	By-election results reversed on petition 11 February 1747
11 December 1746	Ross-shire	c	Charles Ross	Sir Harry Munro	Death
12 December 1746	Bridport	c	George Richards	Thomas Grenville	Death
24 December 1746	Warwickshire	u*	Edward Digby	William Craven	Death
29 December 1746	Whitchurch	u*	John Selwyn	John Selwyn	Paymaster of the Marines
26 January 1747	Eye	u*	Edward Cornwallis	Edward Cornwallis	Groom of the Bedchamber
6 February 1747	Stirlingshire	u	Lord George Graham	Thomas Erskine	Death
10 February 1747	Tregony	u	Henry Penton	Henry Penton	King's Letter Carrier
18 February 1747	Elgin Burghs	u*	Sir James Grant	William Grant	Death
19 February 1747	Orkney and Shetland	u*	Robert Douglas	James Halyburton	Death
11 March 1747	Wigan	u*	Sir Roger Bradshaigh	Richard Clayton	Death
12 May 1747	Thirsk	u*	Sir Thomas Frankland	Thomas Frankland	Death
25 May 1747	Bridport	u*	Thomas Grenville	James Grenville	Death
26 May 1747	Nottingham	u*	Borlase Warren	Sir Charles Sedley	Death
28 May 1747	Old Sarum	u	James Grenville	Edward Willes	Receiver of the Crown and Fee Farm Rents for Warwickshire and Leicestershire

=== 10th Parliament (1747–1754) ===
Date	Constituency	c/u	Former Incumbent	Winner	Cause
7 December 1747	Reigate	u*	Philip Yorke	Charles Yorke	Chose to sit for Cambridgeshire
8 December 1747	Shaftesbury	c	George Pitt	William Beckford	Chose to sit for Dorset
8 December 1747	Stamford	u*	Lord Burghley	Robert Barbor	Chose to sit for Rutland
11 December 1747	Cockermouth	u	Sir Charles Wyndham	William Finch	Chose to sit for Taunton
11 December 1747	Richmond	u*	Sir Conyers Darcy	Earl of Ancram	Chose to sit for Yorkshire
11 December 1747	St Ives	c	Lord Hobart	John Plumptre	Chose to sit for Norwich
12 December 1747	Bossiney	u	Sir Edward Wortley Montagu	William Ord	Chose to sit for Peterborough
12 December 1747	Tavistock	u*	Richard Leveson Gower	Sir Richard Wrottesley	Chose to sit for Lichfield
14 December 1747	Plympton Erle	u	Richard Edgcumbe	George Treby	Chose to sit for Lostwithiel
14 December 1747	Plympton Erle	u	George Edgcumbe	William Baker	Chose to sit for Fowey
15 December 1747	Portsmouth	u	Thomas Gore	Edward Legge	Chose to sit for Bedford
15 December 1747	Saltash	u	Edward Boscawen	Stamp Brooksbank	Chose to sit for Truro
17 December 1747	Downton	c	George Lyttelton	Richard Temple	Chose to sit for Okehampton
17 December 1747	Old Sarum	u	Thomas Pitt	Earl of Middlesex	Chose to sit for Okehampton
17 December 1747	Old Sarum	u	Sir William Irby	The Viscount Doneraile	Chose to sit for Bodmin
21 December 1747	Pembroke Boroughs	u*	William Owen	Hugh Barlow	Chose to sit for Pembrokeshire
26 December 1747	Tiverton	c	Sir William Yonge	Henry Conyngham	Chose to sit for Honiton
28 December 1747	Coventry	c*	Viscount Petersham	Samuel Greatheed	Chose to sit for Bury St Edmunds
28 December 1747	Portsmouth	u*	Edward Legge	Sir Edward Hawke	By-election voided due to Legge having died 87 days before election
20 January 1748	Barnstaple	u	Henry Rolle	Sir Bourchier Wrey	Elevated to the peerage
2 February 1748	Clitheroe	u	Sir Nathaniel Curzon	Nathaniel Curzon	Chose to sit for Derbyshire
15 February 1748	Eye	u*	Roger Townshend	Nicholas Hardinge	Resignation (Receiver General of Customs)
18 February 1748	Northumberland	c	John Fenwick	Lord Ossulston	Death
18 February 1748	Northumberland	c	Lord Ossulston	Lancelot Allgood	By-election results reversed on petition 14 February 1749
8 March 1748	Derby	u	John Stanhope	John Stanhope	Lord of the Admiralty
10 March 1748	Huntingdon	u	Kelland Courtenay	John Montagu	Death
25 March 1748	Bath	c*	George Wade	Sir John Ligonier	Death
14 April 1748	Northamptonshire	c*	Thomas Cartwright	Valentine Knightley	Death
16 April 1748	Montgomery	u	Henry Herbert	Francis Herbert	Death
21 April 1748	Callington	u	Thomas Coplestone	Edward Bacon	Death
27 April 1748	Cornwall	u*	Sir Coventry Carew	James Buller	Death
6 May 1748	Cambridge	u	Samuel Shepheard	Christopher Jeffreason	Death
21 May 1748	Bury St Edmunds	u*	Viscount Petersham	Viscount Petersham	Customer of the Port of Dublin
21 May 1748	Ludlow	u	Sir William Corbet	Sir William Corbet	Clerk of the Pipe
24 May 1748	Lyme Regis	u	Henry Holt Henley	Robert Henley	Death
20 June 1748	Aberdeen Burghs	c	John Maule	Charles Maitland	Resignation (Baron of the Exchequer in Scotland)
7 December 1748	Ludlow	u*	Sir William Corbet	Henry Bridgeman	Death
9 December 1748	Bewdley	c*	William Bowles	William Henry Lyttelton	Death
12 December 1748	St Germans	u*	Richard Eliot	Edward Eliot	Death
12 December 1748	Tamworth	u*	Sir Henry Harpur	Sir Robert Burdett	Death
13 December 1748	Essex	u*	Sir Robert Abdy	Sir John Abdy	Death
15 December 1748	Knaresborough	u*	Richard Arundell	Richard Arundell	Clerk of the Pipe
17 December 1748	Horsham	u*	Charles Ingram	Sir Lionel Pilkington	Death
20 December 1748	Derby	u	John Stanhope	Thomas Rivett	Death
30 December 1748	Christchurch	u*	Edward Hooper	Sir Thomas Robinson	Resignation (Commissioner of Excise)
30 December 1748	Tamworth	u*	Thomas Villiers	Thomas Villiers	Lord of the Admiralty
5 January 1749	Pontefract	u	William Monckton	The Viscount Galway	Resignation (Receiver General of Crown Rents for Yorkshire and County Durham)
31 January 1749	Cambridge	u	Christopher Jeffreason	Charles Sloane Cadogan	Death
9 March 1749	Shrewsbury	u*	William Kinaston	Thomas Hill	Death
30 March 1749	Weobley	u*	Savage Mostyn	Savage Mostyn	Comptroller of the Navy
1 April 1749	Thirsk	u	Frederick Meinhardt Frankland	William Monckton	Resignation (Irish Revenue Commissioner)
3 May 1749	County Durham	u	Henry Vane	Henry Vane	Junior Lord of the Treasury
5 May 1749	Eye	u*	Edward Cornwallis	Courthorpe Clayton	Resignation (Governor of Nova Scotia)
5 May 1749	Orford	u*	Henry Legge	Henry Legge	Treasurer of the Navy
9 May 1749	Caernarvon Boroughs	u*	Sir Thomas Wynn	Sir William Wynn	Death
6 June 1749	Cirencester	u*	Thomas Master	John Coxe	Death
17 June 1749	Tavistock	u	Sir Richard Wrottesley	Sir Richard Wrottesley	Second Clerk Comptroller of the Green Cloth
19 June 1749	Great Yarmouth	u*	Charles Townshend	Charles Townshend	Lord of Trade
21 June 1749	Dunwich	u*	Sir George Downing	Sir Jacob Garrard Downing	Death
21 November 1749	Oxford	u	Philip Herbert	The Viscount Wenman	Death
24 November 1749	Downton	u	Richard Temple	Henry Vane	Death
28 November 1749	Andover	c*	Viscount Lymington	John Griffin Griffin	Death
28 November 1749	Gatton	c	George Newland	Charles Knowles	Death
30 November 1749	West Looe	u*	William Noel	William Noel	Chief Justice of Chester
5 December 1749	Denbighshire	u*	Sir Watkin Williams Wynn	Sir Lynch Salusbury Cotton	Death
13 December 1749	Rye	u	Sir John Norris	Thomas Pelham	Death
20 December 1749	Hastings	u*	Andrew Stone	Andrew Stone	Lord of Trade
23 December 1749	Christchurch	u*	Sir Thomas Robinson	Sir Thomas Robinson	Master of the Great Wardrobe
27 December 1749	Denbigh Boroughs	u*	Richard Myddelton	Richard Myddelton	Steward of Bromfield and Yale
29 December 1749	Ayr Burghs	u	Charles Erskine	Sir Henry Erskine	Death
18 January 1750	Totnes	u*	Sir John Strange	Sir John Strange	Master of the Rolls
23 January 1750	Lancashire	u*	Richard Shuttleworth	Peter Bold	Death
31 January 1750	Oxford University	c*	Viscount Cornbury	Sir Roger Newdigate	Elevated to the House of Lords through a Writ of acceleration
2 February 1750	Launceston	u	Sir William Morice	Humphry Morice	Death
27 February 1750	Taunton	u*	Sir Charles Wyndham	William Rowley	Succeeded to a peerage
8 March 1750	Middlesex	c*	Sir Hugh Smithson	George Cooke	Succeeded to a peerage
6 April 1750	Plymouth	u	Lord Vere Beauclerk	Charles Saunders	Elevated to the peerage
10 April 1750	New Shoreham	u	Charles Frederick	Charles Frederick	Surveyor-General of the Ordnance
23 April 1750	Boroughbridge	u*	Earl of Dalkeith	Lewis Watson	Death
25 April 1750	Yorkshire	u*	Sir Miles Stapylton	The Viscount Downe	Resignation (Commissioner of Customs)
15 May 1750	Westminster	c	Viscount Trentham	Viscount Trentham	Lord of the Admiralty
18 May 1750	Lanarkshire	u	Sir James Hamilton	Patrick Stuart	Death
22 January 1751	East Grinstead	u*	Sydney Smythe	Joseph Yorke	Resignation (Baron of the Exchequer)
23 January 1751	Rochester	u*	Sir Chaloner Ogle	John Byng	Death
25 January 1751	Heytesbury	u*	William Ashe	William Ashe-à Court	Death
25 January 1751	Old Sarum	u	The Viscount Doneraile	Paul Jodrell	Death
25 January 1751	Wareham	u*	John Pitt	Henry Drax	Resignation to contest Dorchester
28 January 1751	Weymouth and Melcombe Regis	u	Richard Plumer	Lord George Augustus Cavendish	Death
29 January 1751	Dorchester	u	John Browne	George Damer	Death
29 January 1751	Dorchester	u*	Nathaniel Gundry	John Pitt	Resignation (Puisne Justice of the Common Pleas)
14 February 1751	Edinburghshire	u	Sir Charles Gilmour	Robert Balfour Ramsay	Death
27 March 1751	Aberdeen Burghs	u*	Charles Maitland	David Scott	Death
1 April 1751	Newark-on-Trent	c*	Job Staunton Charlton	Job Staunton Charlton	Clerk of the Deliveries of the Ordnance
4 April 1751	Haddington Burghs	u*	Andrew Fletcher	Andrew Fletcher	Auditor of the Exchequer in Scotland
10 April 1751	Worcestershire	u*	Viscount Deerhurst	John Bulkeley Coventry	Succeeded to a peerage
22 April 1751	Downton	c	George Proctor	Thomas Duncombe	Death
27 April 1751	Gatton	u*	Paul Humphrey	James Colebrooke	Death
4 May 1751	Hindon	c	Valens Comyn	Francis Blake Delaval	Death
8 May 1751	Hampshire	u*	Francis Whithed	Alexander Thistlethwayte	Death
8 May 1751	Surrey	u*	The Lord Baltimore	Thomas Budgen	Death
13 May 1751	Saltash	u	Thomas Corbett	George Brydges Rodney	Death
28 May 1751	Winchester	c	George William Brydges	George Paulet St John	Death
13 June 1751	Malmesbury	u	James Douglas	Edward Digby	Death
24 June 1751	Chippenham	u*	Edward Bayntun Rolt	Edward Bayntun Rolt	Surveyor-General of the Duchy of Cornwall
24 June 1751	Taunton	u	William Rowley	William Rowley	Naval Lord
26 June 1751	Tregony	u*	William Trevanion	William Trevanion	Auditor of the Duchy of Cornwall
27 June 1751	Derbyshire	u	Marquess of Hartington	Lord Frederick Cavendish	Elevated to the House of Lords through a Writ of acceleration
28 June 1751	St Germans	u*	Edward Eliot	Edward Eliot	Receiver General of the Duchy of Cornwall
28 June 1751	Truro	u*	Edward Boscawen	Edward Boscawen	Naval Lord
2 July 1751	Liskeard	u	Charles Trelawny	Charles Trelawny	Assay-Master of Tin for the Duchy of Cornwall
25 July 1751	Wigtownshire	u*	John Stewart	John Stewart	Clerk of the Pipe of the Exchequer in Scotland
19 November 1751	Gloucester	u*	John Selwyn	Charles Barrow	Death
21 November 1751	Bath	u*	Robert Henley	Robert Henley	King's Counsel
21 November 1751	Whitchurch	u	John Selwyn	Lord Robert Bertie	Death
22 November 1751	Bramber	u	Henry Gough	Henry Pelham	Death
22 November 1751	Carmarthen	u*	Thomas Mathews	Griffith Philipps	Death
22 November 1751	Old Sarum	c	Paul Jodrell	Simon Fanshawe	Death
26 November 1751	Christchurch	u*	Sir Charles Armand Powlett	Harry Powlett	Death
26 November 1751	Pontefract	u	The Viscount Galway	Robert Monckton	Death
9 December 1751	St Ives	c	John Plumptre	Samuel Stephens	Death
24 December 1751	East Retford	u*	William Mellish	John Shelley	Resignation (Commissioner of Excise)
26 December 1751	East Looe	u*	Francis Gashry	Francis Gashry	Treasurer and Paymaster of the Ordnance
30 December 1751	Wilton	u*	Robert Sawyer Herbert	Robert Sawyer Herbert	Surveyor General of the Land Revenues of the Crown
2 January 1752	Fifeshire	u	James Oswald	James Oswald	Lord of Trade
7 February 1752	Dover	u*	Thomas Revell	William Cayley	Death
18 February 1752	Marlborough	u*	Sir John Hynde Cotton	Sir John Hynde Cotton	Death
22 February 1752	Bossiney	u	Richard Heath	William Montagu	Death
28 March 1752	Dorchester	c	George Damer	George Clavell	Death
3 April 1752	Northallerton	u*	Henry Lascelles	Daniel Lascelles	Resignation (Chief Steward of the Honour of Berkhampstead)
10 April 1752	Gatton	u	Charles Knowles	William Bateman	Resignation (Governor of Jamaica)
13 January 1753	St Mawes	u	The Lord Sundon	Sir Thomas Clavering	Death
16 January 1753	Westbury	u*	Matthew Michell	Peregrine Bertie	Death
16 January 1753	Westminster	u*	Sir Peter Warren	Edward Cornwallis	Death
17 January 1753	Buckingham	u	Viscount Cobham	Temple West	Succeeded to a peerage
17 January 1753	Wendover	u*	The Earl Verney	The Earl Verney	Death
19 January 1753	Bodmin	c*	John LaRoche	George Hunt	Death
19 January 1753	Bridgwater	u*	Peregrine Poulett	Robert Balch	Death
19 January 1753	Lyme Regis	u*	John Scrope	Thomas Fane	Death
20 January 1753	Bere Alston	u*	Sir Francis Henry Drake	Sir Francis Henry Drake	Second Clerk Comptroller of the Green Cloth
20 January 1753	Bishop's Castle	c*	Samuel Child	John Dashwood King	Death
20 January 1753	Ludgershall	u	George Augustus Selwyn	George Augustus Selwyn	Registrar of the Court of Chancery in Barbados
21 January 1753	Rutland	c*	James Noel	Thomas Noel	Death
27 January 1753	Mitchell	u	Albert Nesbitt	Arnold Nesbitt	Death
29 January 1753	Beaumaris	u	The Viscount Bulkeley	John Owen	Death
7 February 1753	Cheshire	u	John Crewe	Charles Crewe	Death
31 March 1753	New Woodstock	u*	John Trevor	Anthony Keck	Succeeded to a peerage
6 April 1753	Salisbury	u(*)	Edward Poore	Edward Poore	Puisne Justice of Carmarthen
25 April 1753	Maidstone	u*	William Horsemonden Turner	Gabriel Hanger	Death
12 May 1753	Downton	u	Henry Vane	James Hayes	Resignation to contest County Durham
19 May 1753	County Durham	u*	Henry Vane	Henry Vane	Succeeded to a peerage
21 November 1753	Harwich	u*	Viscount Coke	Wenman Coke	Death
21 November 1753	Higham Ferrers	u*	John Hill	John Yorke	Death
24 November 1753	Lichfield	c	Richard Leveson Gower	Sir Thomas Gresley	Death
24 November 1753	Lichfield	c	Sir Thomas Gresley	Henry Vernon	By-election results reversed on petition 29 January 1754
28 November 1753	Flint Boroughs	u*	Kyffin Williams	Sir John Glynne	Death
5 December 1753	Bedfordshire	u*	Sir Danvers Osborn	The Earl of Upper Ossory	Resignation (Governor of New York)
13 December 1753	Selkirkshire	u*	John Murray	Gilbert Elliot	Death
26 December 1753	Worcestershire	u*	Edmund Pytts (I)	Edmund Pytts (II)	Death
25 January 1754	Midhurst	u*	Sir Thomas Bootle	John Sargent	Death
26 January 1754	Rochester	u*	David Polhill	Nicholas Haddock	Death
9 February 1754	Petersfield	u*	William Conolly	William Gerard Hamilton	Death
15 February 1754	Amersham	u*	Sir Henry Marshall	Isaac Whittington	Death
15 February 1754	Boroughbridge	u*	Lewis Watson	Lewis Watson	Auditor of the imprests
25 February 1754	Wendover	u*	John Hampden	John Calvert	Death
