= Sir William Williams, 2nd Baronet, of Gray's Inn =

Welsh politician

Sir William Williams, 2nd Baronet (c. 1665 – 20 October 1740), of Glascoed, Llansilin, Denbighshire was a Welsh landowner and Tory politician who sat in the House of Commons from 1708 to 1710.

== Early life ==
Williams was the son of Sir William Williams, 1st Baronet, of Gray's Inn and his wife Margaret Kyffin. His father was Speaker of the House of Commons. Williams married Jane Thelwall, the great-granddaughter of Sir John Wynn, 1st Baronet, and daughter and heiress of Edward Thelwall of Plas-y-Ward in 1684. The name Thelwall is cognate with the name Llewellyn. In 1695, he was appointed Sheriff of Denbighshire. He succeeded his father to the baronetcy on 11 July 1700. He became Sheriff of Montgomeryshire for 1704, Sheriff of Merioneth for 1706 and Sheriff of Caernarvonshire for 1707.

== Career ==
Williams was returned unopposed as Tory Member of Parliament for Denbigh Boroughs at the 1708 British general election. He told for the Tories in a division over an electoral petition and voted against the impeachment of Dr Sacheverell in 1710. He declined to stand at the 1710 British general election, probably on account of ill-health.

== Later life and legacy ==
Williams' wife died in 1706 and he married as his second wife Catherine Davies, daughter of Mytton Davies of Gwysan, Flintshire. In 1719, he came into the entire Wynnstay estate near Ruabon, Denbighshire, together with estates in Montgomery, Merioneth and Llangedwyn, Denbighshire, from his first wife's relative, Sir John Wynn, 5th Baronet. Since Wynn and Sir William Williams were the two largest landowners in north Wales at that time, the combined estate dwarfed all others in the area. In honour of his wife's ancestry, Sir William changed his name to Sir William Williams-Wynn of Wynnstay.

Williams died on 20 October 1740, aged about 75. His children by his first wife included Sir Watkin Williams Wynn, 3rd Baronet, Robert Williams, MP, Richard Williams, MP and a daughter Sydney, who married John Wynne.

Parliament of Great Britain
Preceded by William Robinson	Member of Parliament for Denbigh Boroughs; 1708–1710	Succeeded by John Roberts
Baronetage of England
Preceded by William Williams	Baronet (of Gray's Inn); 1700–1740	Succeeded by Watkin Williams-Wynn
