= Sir Watkin Williams-Wynn, 3rd Baronet =

British politician and landowner

Sir Watkin Williams-Wynn Bt
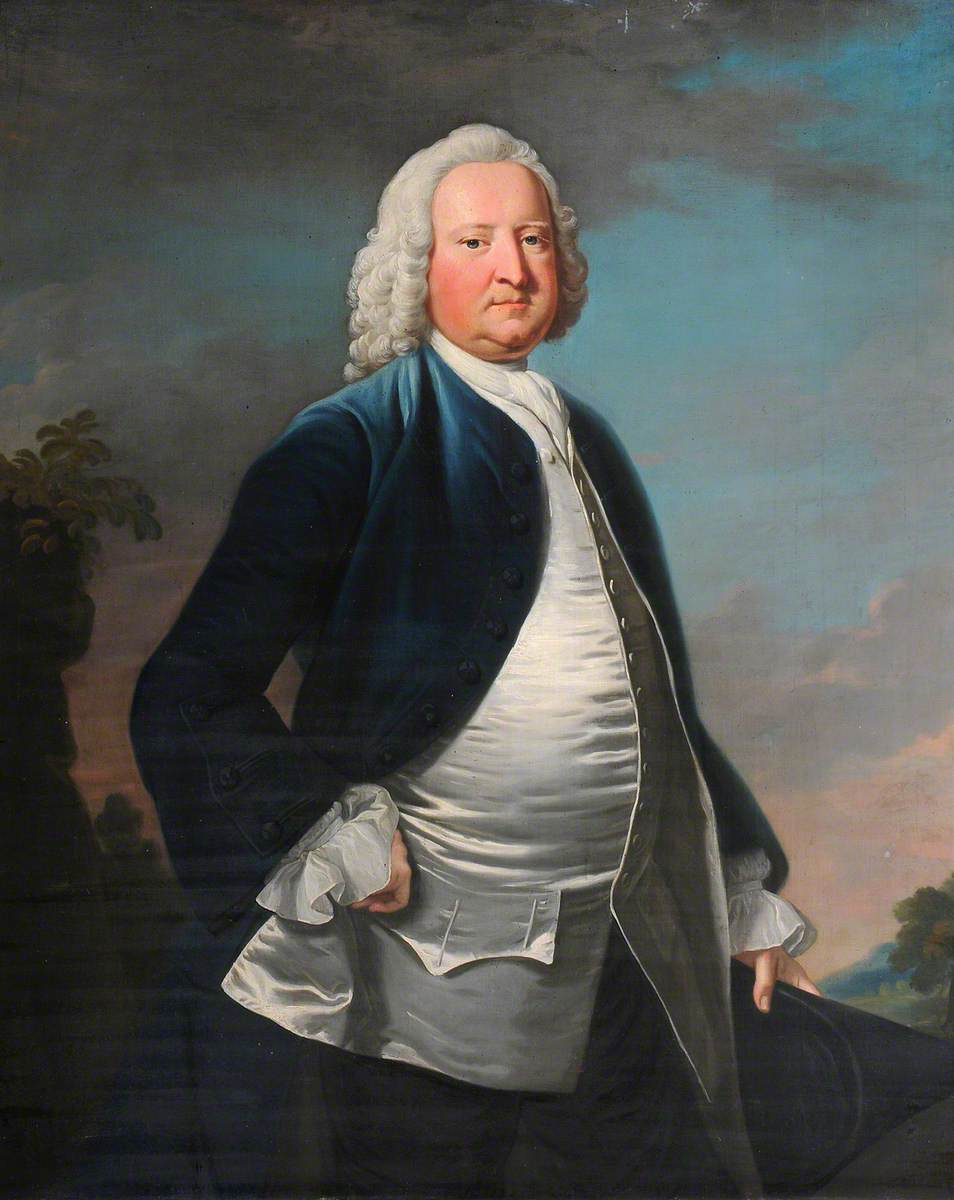

MP for Denbighshire
- In office 30 June 1716 – 1741

MP for Montgomeryshire
- In office 1741 – 23 February 1742

MP for Denbighshire
- In office 23 February 1742 – 20 September 1749

Mayor of Oswestry
- In office 29 September 1728 – 28 September 1729

Mayor of Chester
- In office 29 September 1732 – 28 September 1733

Personal details
- Born: 1692 Llanforda, near Oswestry
- Died: 20 September 1749 (aged 57) Ruabon
- Resting place: St Mary's, Ruabon
- Party: Tory
- Spouse(s): (1) Anne Vaughan, 1715 – 1748 (2) Frances Shakerley, July 1748
- Children: John Williams Wynn (1716 – died young); Mary Williams (1717–1735); Sir Watkin Williams-Wynn, 4th Baronet (1748–1789)
- Parent(s): Sir William Williams, 2nd Baronet; Jane Thelwall
- Education: Jesus College, Oxford
- Occupation: Landowner and politician

Sir Watkin Williams-Wynn, 3rd Baronet (c. 1692 – 26 September 1749) was a British Tory politician and landowner who represented Denbighshire and Montgomeryshire in the House of Commons of Great Britain from 1716 to 1749. A lifelong Tory, he was also a prominent Jacobite sympathiser. Williams-Wynn helped engineer the downfall of Prime Minister Robert Walpole in 1742 and engaged in negotiations with the exiled Stuarts prior to the Jacobite rising of 1745 but did not participate in the rebellion himself. Williams-Wynn died in a hunting accident in 1749.

== Life ==
Williams-Wynn was the eldest son of Sir William Williams, 2nd Baronet, of Llanforda near Oswestry in Shropshire and Jane Thelwall. His grandfather, also Sir William Williams was Solicitor General under James II and led the prosecution of the Seven Bishops in 1688. His mother was a descendant of the antiquary Sir John Wynn,

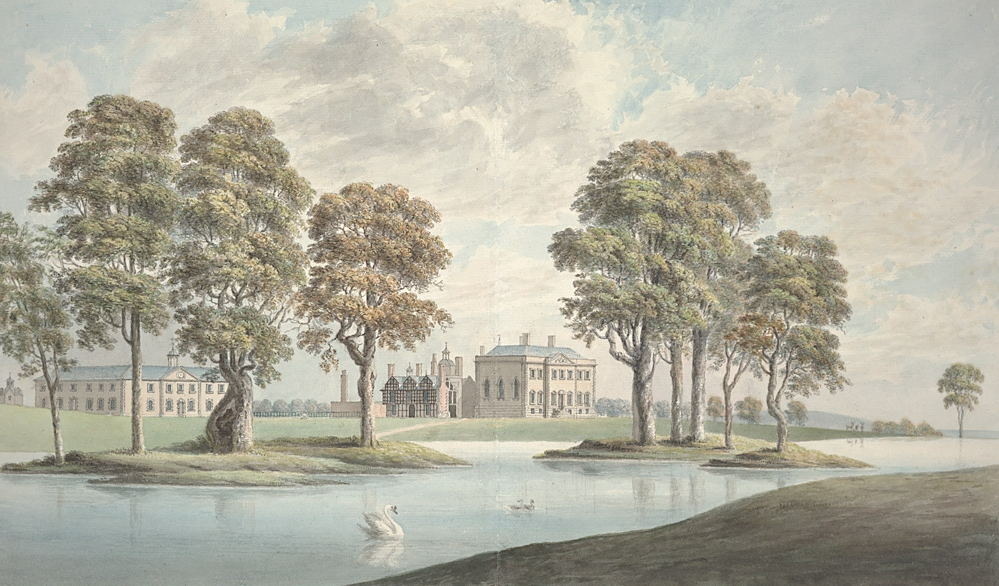
Wynnstay, c. 1793, destroyed by fire in 1858

In 1719, a later Sir John Wynn died, and through his mother's kinship Watkin inherited the Wynnstay estates on condition he added "Wynn" to his name, followed by his father's title and lands on his death in 1740. Through his first wife, Ann Vaughan (c. 1695–1748), Williams-Wynn acquired extensive estates in Montgomeryshire and Denbighshire and over time became the pre-eminent landowner in North Wales. When Anne died in March 1748, he married another heiress, his god-daughter Frances Shackerley (1721–1803); his son and heir, Sir Watkin Williams-Wynn, 4th Baronet (1749–1789) was born a few months before Sir Watkin's death in a hunting accident in September 1749.

== Political career ==
After graduating from Jesus College, Oxford, Williams-Wynn became Member of Parliament or MP for Denbighshire in 1716. His first recorded speech in Parliament did not occur until 1727 but he was an active member of the Tory Jacobite faction. As a leader of the Cycle of the White Rose, a Welsh Jacobite society, he "burnt the King's picture" during the 1722 General Election, opposed a "loyal address" to George I following the Atterbury Plot, and was a board member of the High Tory Loyal Brotherhood. He also served as Mayor of Oswestry in 1728/1729 and of Chester in 1736/1737.

His money and connections made Williams-Wynn a formidable local political power; in 1722, nine out of eleven Parliamentary seats in North Wales returned Tory candidates. While fiercely contested, the election confirmed the dominance of Robert Walpole and the Whig party; their exclusion from government resulted in the continuing expression of Jacobite sympathies among the more extreme Tories. Williams-Wynn employed Welsh colliers to threaten Whig supporters in the 1733 Chester mayoral election but overtly Jacobite displays were rare and often rooted in Tory opposition to Welsh religious Nonconformists.

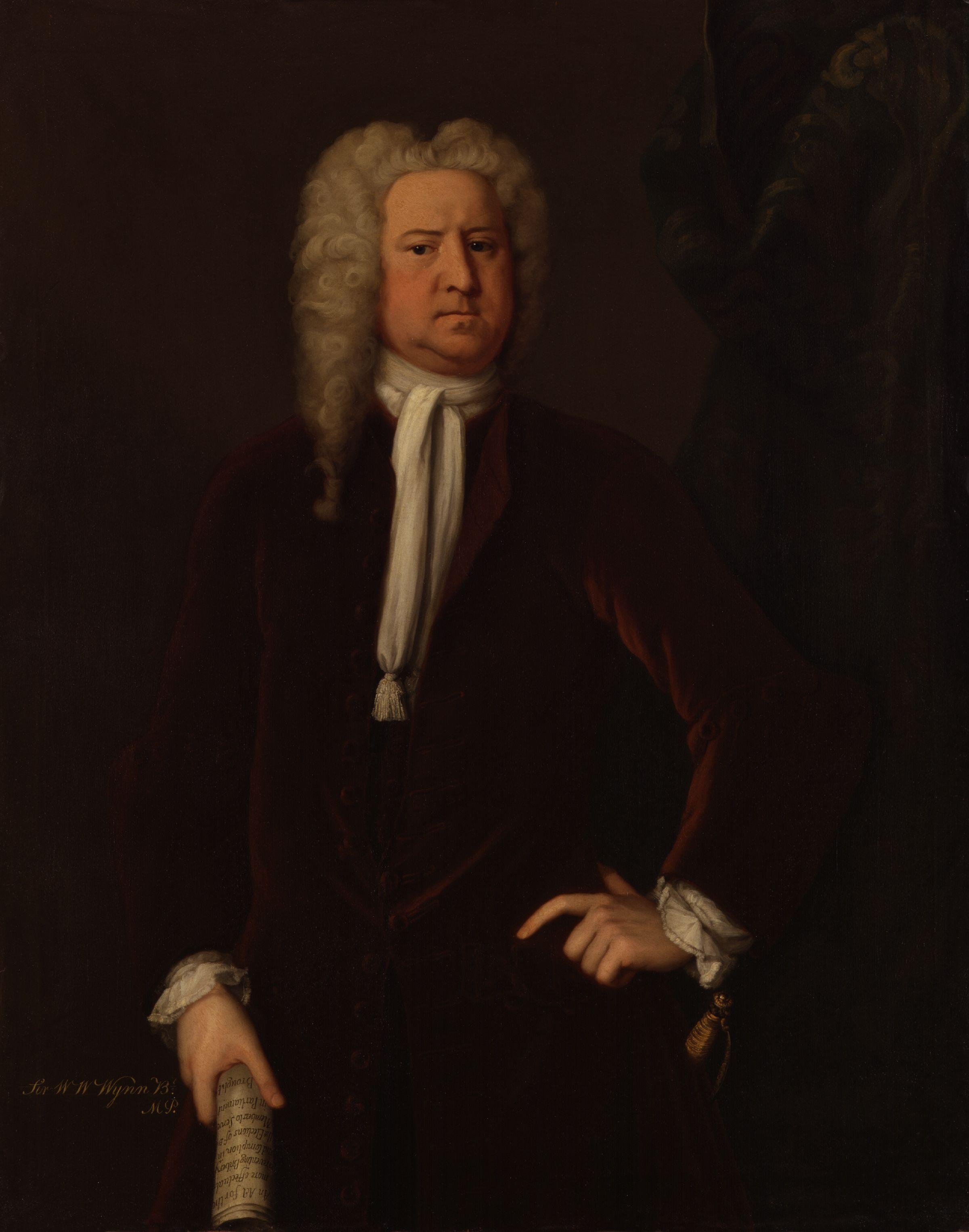
Sir Watkin William-Wynn c. 1740

The complexity of Jacobite support was demonstrated in 1736 when Williams-Wynn and other Tory Jacobites voted against repealing the Test Act and removing legal restrictions on those who were not members of the Church of England, such as Nonconformists and Catholics like the exiled Stuarts. Opposition to religious minorities, in general, was fuelled by memories of the divisions that led to the 1639–1651 Wars of the Three Kingdoms; it was particularly strong in Wales due to the early 18th century Welsh Methodist revival.

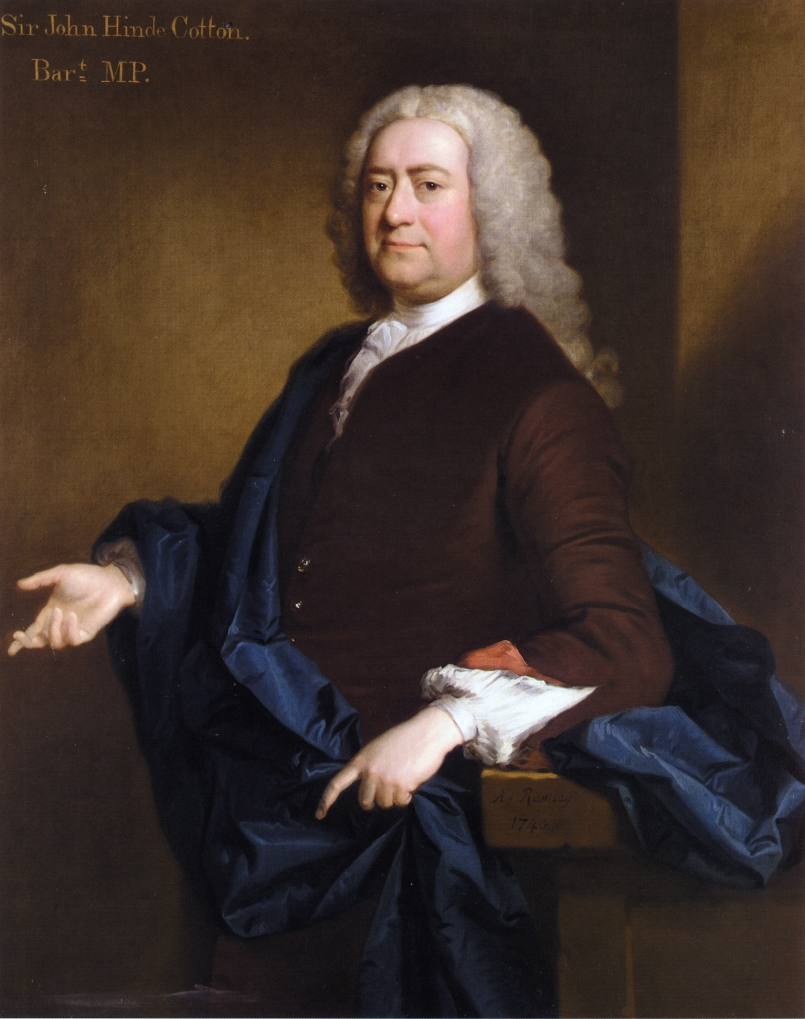
Sir John Hynde Cotton (1686–1752), Williams-Wynn's Tory colleague in ousting Walpole in 1742

When the Tory leader Sir William Wyndham died in 1740, Williams-Wynn led the campaign against Walpole, in partnership with Sir John Hynde Cotton, allegedly one of "the most zealous Jacobites in England." In contrast to Williams-Wynn, Cotton was a gifted orator who helped organised the Parliamentary campaign against Walpole.

In the 1741 General Election, Walpole targeted Williams-Wynn's Denbighshire seat; although he won the popular vote by 1352 votes to 933, 594 of these were disallowed, returning his rival. He sat instead for Montgomeryshire and after Walpole's resignation in 1742, regained his seat of Denbighshire on appeal. However, the chief beneficiaries of Walpole's fall were the so-called Patriot Whigs and a Tory faction led by Lord Gower who became Lord Privy Seal in 1742. This led Jacobites like Williams-Wynn and the 4th Duke of Beaufort to re-open negotiations with Stuart agents such as Francis Sempill.

In early 1744, Cotton accepted a government position in Henry Pelham's so-called Broad Bottom Ministry and Williams-Wynn voted with the government for the first time in his career. Although Britain and France were then engaged in the War of the Austrian Succession, in October 1744 he secretly travelled to Versailles where Louis XV assured him of French support for a Jacobite rising.

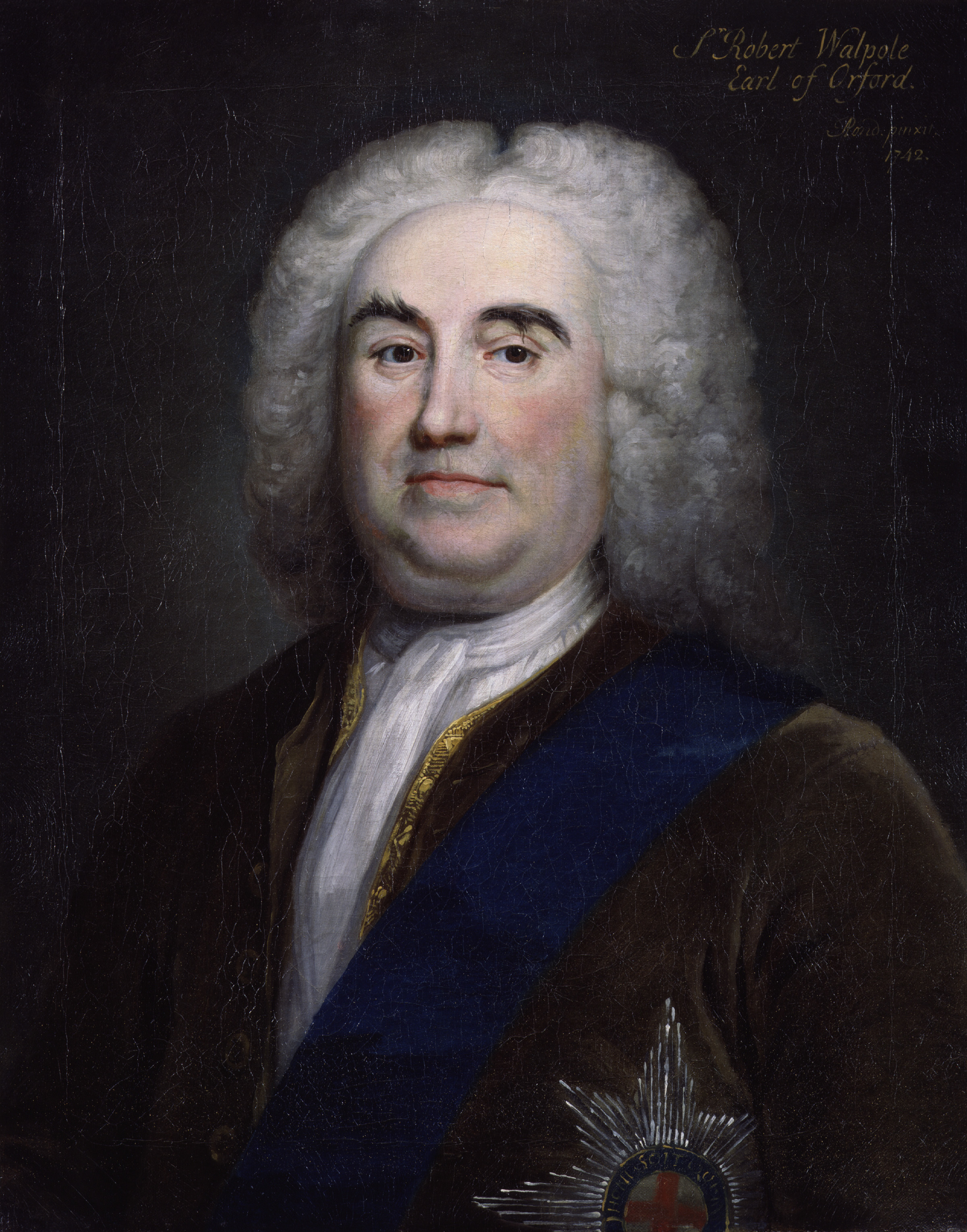
Robert Walpole, Whig Prime Minister 1721–1742

In common with many other Jacobites, Williams-Wynn's support was conditional on a substantial French military landing in England. When Charles Stuart invaded England during the 1745 Rising, Williams-Wynn remained in London to attend Parliament, only sending an oral message promising help when a French army arrived, an offer that arrived too late to help Charles. After the Rebellion ended, the testimony of Prince Charles' former secretary Murray of Broughton led to the execution of Lord Lovat; he also implicated a number of Tories, including Williams-Wynn and Cotton but the government decided against further prosecutions.

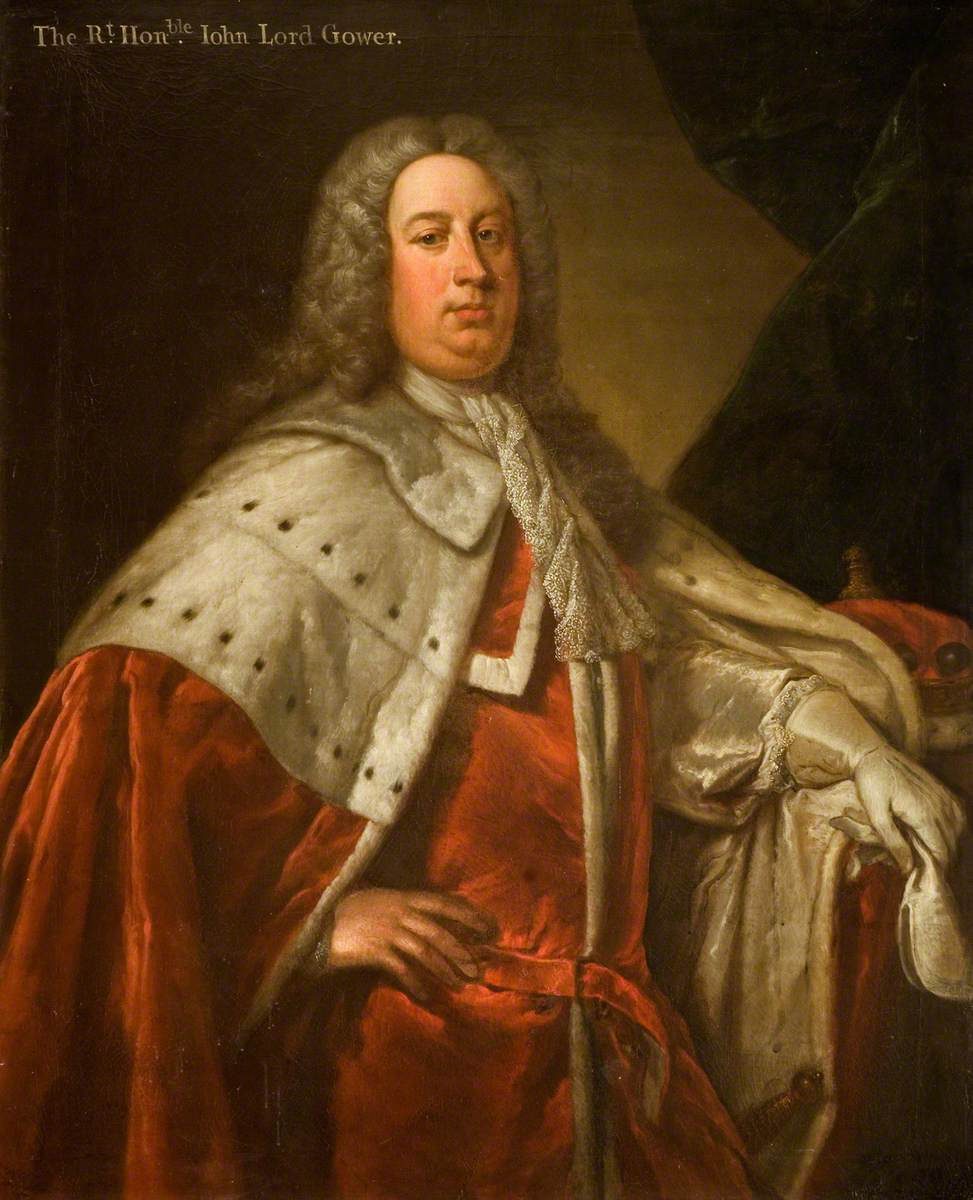
Lord Gower (1694–1754); in 1742, he became the first Tory to hold senior office under the Hanoverians

The Tories were now split into a "Jacobite" faction led by Williams-Wynn and those who followed Lord Gower; in an effort to stir up support and differentiate themselves, Williams-Wynn and others participated in Jacobite demonstrations at the 1747 Lichfield Races. Despite these efforts, the 1747 General Election reduced the Jacobite Tories to a largely irrelevant rump.

Despite his failure to participate in the 1745 Rising, Williams-Wynn wrote to Prince Charles in December 1747, assuring him that his supporters wished "for nothing more than another happy opportunity wherein they may exert themselves more in deeds than in words, in the support of your Royal Highness's dignity and interest and the cause of liberty." The tendency to say one thing and do another was not uncommon; for example, Cotton urged Louis XV to invade in August 1745, despite being a government minister at the time.

The demonstration at Lichfield was one of the last significant displays of Jacobite sentiment, although his son the 4th Baronet re-established the White Rose Cycle in 1770, where it served as a club for a range of independent opinions.

== Legacy ==
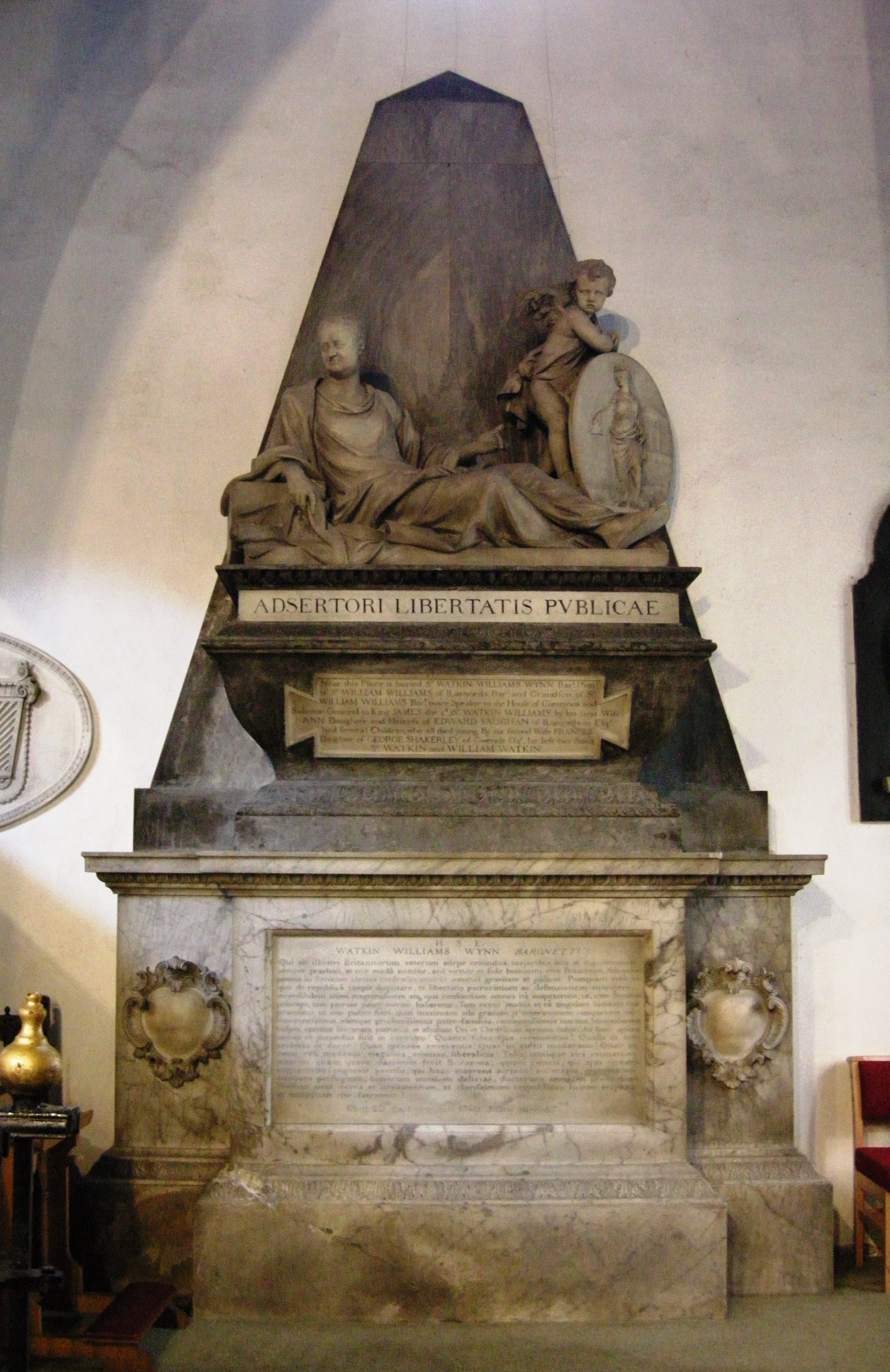
Monument to Sir Watkin Williams-Wynn at Ruabon, by Michael Rysbrack.

He was buried at Ruabon in the parish church of St Mary's. His widow, Dame Frances, commissioned a monument from the sculptor Michael Rysbrack completed in 1755; it was too large for the existing chancel and a new south-east chapel was built to house it.

He commissioned the building of a new mansion at Wynnstay to replace the original by William Eyton in 1616, later destroyed by fire in 1858. At his death, his estates stretched over five Welsh counties and into the English county of Shropshire, reputedly producing an estimated rental income of £20,000. This was a very substantial sum at the time but it was also rumoured that his political activities left his heir with debts of over £120,000.

Sir Watkin Williams-Wynn left a number of items to Jesus College, including a massive silver-gilt punch bowl weighing more than 200 ounces (5.7 kg) and holding 10 imperial gallons (45 L). This was used at a dinner in 1814, celebrating the defeat of Napoleon; attendees included the Tsar of Russia, Frederick of Prussia, General Blücher, Metternich, the Prince Regent, the Duke of York and the Duke of Wellington.

A portrait of Williams-Wynn by Thomas Hudson was acquired by Jesus College in 1997; it is not on public display as it hangs in the Senior Common Room of the college. It shows him wearing a sky-blue coat, a symbol used by Tory Jacobite sympathisers.

== Coat of arms ==
Coat of arms of Sir Watkin Williams-Wynn, 3rd Baronet
Crest An eagle displayed or. Escutcheon Quarterly, 1st and 4th, Vert three eagles displayed in fesse or (Wynn), 2nd and 3rd, Argent two foxes counter-salient Gules the dexter surmounted of the sinister (Williams). Motto Eryr Eryror Eryri (The eagle of the eagles of Snowdon)

== Sources ==
- Forbes, John. "The History of Parliament: the House of Commons 1715–1754".;
- Cokayne, G.E., ed. (1904). The Complete Baronetage, Volume IV. William Pollard & Co.;
- Cruickshanks, Eveline (1979). Political Untouchables: The Tories and the '45. Holmes & Meier Pub. ISBN 978-0841905115.;
- Glanville, Philippa (2004). "A Treasured Inheritance". Oxford Today. 16 (3). Oxford University Public Affairs Directorate.;
- Lord, Evelyn (2004). The Stuart Secret Army: The Hidden History of the English Jacobites. Pearson. ISBN 978-0582772564.
- Monod, Paul Kleber (1993). Jacobitism and the English People, 1688–1788. Cambridge University Press. ISBN 0521447933.;
- Riding, Jacqueline (2016). Jacobites; A New History of the 45 Rebellion. Bloomsbury. ISBN 978-1408819128.;
- Thomas, Peter D. G. (2004). Wynn, Sir Watkin Williams, third baronet (1693?–1749). ONDB.

Parliament of Great Britain
Preceded by Sir Richard Myddelton	Member of Parliament for Denbighshire; 1716–1741	Succeeded by John Myddelton
Preceded by Robert Williams	Member of Parliament for Montgomeryshire; 1741–1742	Succeeded by Robert Williams
Preceded by John Myddelton	Member of Parliament for Denbighshire; 1742–1749	Succeeded by Sir Lynch Cotton, Bt.
Political offices
Preceded by Edward Lloyd	Mayor of Oswestry; 1728–1729	Succeeded by Charles Lloyd
Preceded by John Cotgreave	Mayor of Chester; 1736–1737	Succeeded by Sir Robert Grosvenor
Baronetage of England
Preceded by William Williams	Baronet; 1740–1749	Succeeded by Watkin Williams-Wynn
