= Alexander Brodie (died 1770) =

Scottish politician

Alexander Brodie of Lethen (died 28 April 1770) was a Scottish politician.

He was the Member of Parliament (MP) for Nairnshire from 1735 to 1741.

He was the oldest son of Alexander Brodie (of Duneran 1691 and Lethen 1703), and his wife Sophia, a daughter of Sir Hugh Campbell of Calder. He succeeded to his father's estates in 1745. In 1754 he married Henrietta Grant, a daughter of the Colonel William Grant of Ballindalloch, with whom he had two sons and three daughters.

Parliament of Great Britain
Preceded by John Campbell	Member of Parliament for Nairnshire; 1735–1741	Vacant alternating constituency with Elginshire Title next held by John Campbell from 1747
