= William Knollys (Banbury MP) =

William Knollys (15 October 1694 – 6 June 1740), known as Viscount Wallingford, of St George's, Hanover Square, Westminster, was a British Army officer and politician who sat in the House of Commons from 1733 to 1740.

Knollys was the eldest surviving son of Charles Knollys of Oxfordshire and his wife Elizabeth Lister, daughter of Michael Lister of Burwell, Lincolnshire. He joined the army and was ensign in Colonel Pocock's regiment in 1715 and cornet in the 2nd Dragoon Guards in 1718 of which he was lieutenant in 1727. He married his first cousin, Mary Catherine Law, daughter of John Law, director general of the French finances, and his aunt Catherine Knollys.

Knollys' father claimed to be descended from William Knollys MP, the 1st Earl of Banbury, and called himself the 4th Earl, while his son took the courtesy title of Viscount Wallingford. However, the father's claim had been rejected by the House of Lords in 1697.

Knollys stood unsuccessfully for Banbury at a by-election on 21 January 1730, but was elected as Member of Parliament for Banbury at a second attempt at a by-election 9 April 1733. He was returned unopposed at the 1734 British general election and voted with the Administration on the Spanish convention in 1739 and on the place bill in 1740.

Knollys became 2nd major in the 1st troop of Life Guards in 1737. He died on 6 June 1740, pre-deceasing his father. His widow, Lady Mary, retired to Upper Brook Street, Mayfair.

Parliament of Great Britain
Preceded by Toby Chauncy	Member of Parliament for Banbury; 1733–1740	Succeeded by William Moore
