= William Moore (Banbury MP) =

British politician (1699–1746)

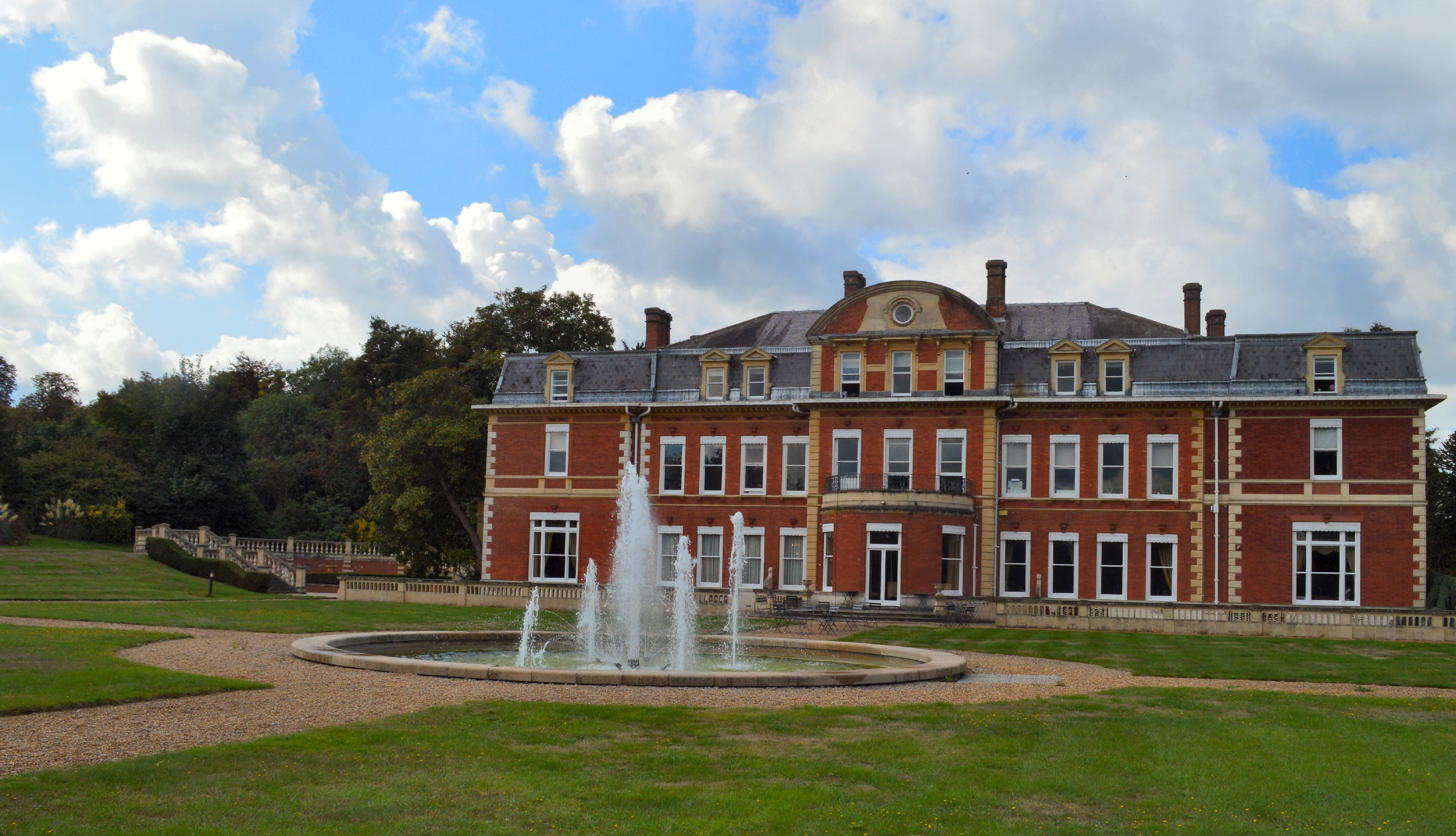
Moore's country seat, Fetcham Park

William Moore (4 June 1699 – 26 October 1746) was a British politician who represented Banbury in the House of Commons of Great Britain from 1740 to 1746.

Moore was the eldest son of Arthur Moore and his second wife who was from Linton, Gloucestershire. In 1730, he succeeded his father to Fetcham Park, Surrey, which his father had built at vast expense. He had to sell it in February 1735 to pay his father's debts on it. However he succeeded his uncle, Colonel Thomas Moore. at Polesden Lacey in 1735.

Moore was returned as Member of Parliament for Banbury at a by-election on 25 November 1740 by his friend Francis North, 1st Earl of Guilford. He voted against the Administration in all recorded divisions except for the motion for removing Walpole in February 1741. He was returned unopposed for Banbury at the 1741 British general election. He signed the opposition whip of 10 March 1743.

Moore died on 26 October 1746, and left his estates to North's son Frederick, the future prime minister, whose trustees sold Polesden Lacey a year later for £5,500 to pay the debts encumbering the estate.

Parliament of Great Britain
Preceded by William Knollys	Member of Parliament for Banbury; 1740–1746	Succeeded by John Willes
