= Philip Bennet (Bath MP) =

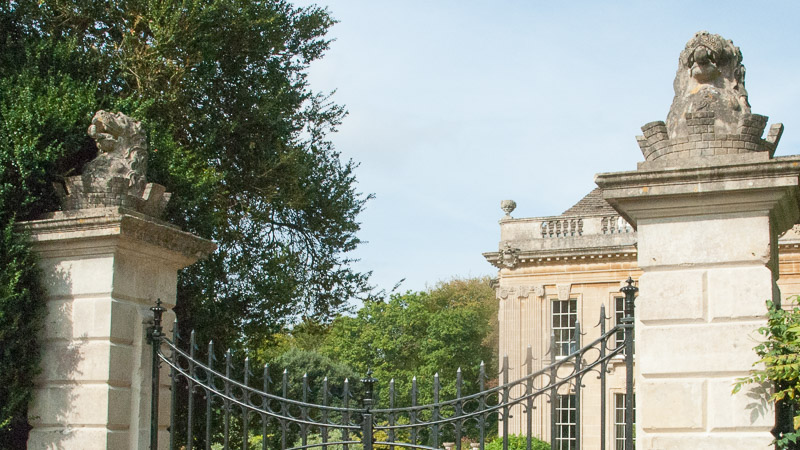
The Bennet crest sits either side of the gates of Widcombe Manor in Bath, Somerset, once the seat of the Bennet family. The motto, Bene Tenax, means "with noble tenacity".

Philip Bennet (1703–1761), of Widcombe Manor, Bath, South Brewham and Maperton in Somerset, was a member of an ancient English Landed Family called Bennet. The Bennet family originated around the Norton Bavant area of Wiltshire with links to Cambridgeshire and can be traced back to Robert Bennet (fl. 1180) who was Keeper of the King's Seal.

Philip was a Member (MP) of the Parliament of England for Shaftesbury in 1734 – 20 February 1735 and 9 March 1738 – 1741, and for Bath in 1741–1747. He was the best known of the Bennet family in Bath.

In keeping with the Bennet tradition as the first born son, he was named after his father. His parents, Philip Bennet and Jane Chapman, were to have a total of 7 children. One of these, Jane Bennet, married Philip Allen, the brother of local entrepreneur and philanthropist, Ralph Allen.

Philip married twice, his first wife, Anne Estcourt, dying childless in 1730 aged 24. He had three children with his second wife, Mary Hallam who died in 1739 aged 26. These were Philip followed by Mary, then Thomas. Both wives have prominent memorial plaques dedicated to them inside St Thomas à Becket Church next door to Widcombe Manor. They are buried inside the Bennet family tomb which can still be seen today in the tiny churchyard overlooking the manor.

The antiquary Robert Edward Myhill Peach noted that "It is strange that this gentleman, so reserved and circumspect up to middle age, entered about 1747 upon a career of wild dissipation, squandering his fortune with reckless prodigality."

As one of Bath's most prominent residents, Philip Bennet had a street named after him. Bennett Street, now spelt with two t's, is located in the city centre of Bath and is just off Landsdown Road.
