= William Kirkpatrick (Scottish MP) =

Scottish lawyer, academic and politician (1705–1777)

William Kirkpatrick of Ellisland and Shaws (1705 – 17 October 1777) was a Scottish lawyer, academic and politician.

== Biography ==
He was born in 1705 at Closeburn Castle, the third son of Sir Thomas Kirkpatrick, 2nd Baronet of Closeburn, and Dame Isobell Lockhart. His father died before William and his older brother Thomas (later 3rd Baronet of Closeburn) turned 18, which led to local gentleman and future MP Charles Areskine (Erskine), Lord Tinwald overseeing the end of their formal education. It is likely he encouraged William to read law and attend Leiden University in the Netherlands.

William married Areskine's daughter Jean Erskine, 21 years his junior, on 21 December 1746 in Edinburgh, and they had at least five children. Jean died in childbirth aged just 26 on 23 September 1752.

Once qualified in law, William held the post of Regius Professor of the Law of Nature and Nations at Edinburgh from 2 December 1734 to May 1735, replacing Areskine who had stepped aside for him. When in 1735 he resigned from that role, it was to contest the by-election for his father-in-law’s Dumfries Burghs seat in the House of Commons after Areskine won both it and Dumfriesshire in the 1734 election. There then followed a protracted dispute over a double return (where the returning officer declares both pairs of candidates to be elected, leaving the House of Commons to make the decision) of that bi-election, the result of which was that William did not take his seat until 13 February 1736. He served as Member of Parliament until 1738, at which point he became Clerk of Session at the Court of Session.

He was appointed the first crown-nominated Sheriff of Dumfries in 1747.

William died on 17 October 1777 at Shaws House, Dumfriesshire aged 72. Among his grandsons were the noted antiquary and artist Charles Kirkpatrick Sharpe and his older brother General Matthew Sharpe, who followed in the footsteps of both Areskine and Kirkpatrick by serving as Member of Parliament for Dumfries Burghs, albeit 100 years later.

Parliament of Great Britain
Preceded by Charles Erskine	Member of Parliament for Dumfries Burghs; 1735 – 1738	Succeeded by Sir Robert Laurie, 4th Bt
