= Duncan Urquhart (politician) =

British Member of Parliament (died 1742)

Duncan Urquhart (died 11 January 1742), of Burdsyards, Morayshire, was a British Army officer and Scottish Whig politician who sat in the House of Commons from 1737 to 1741.

== Early life ==
Urquhart was the eldest son of Captain Robert Urquhart, MP of Burdsyards and his wife Mary Forbes, daughter of Duncan Forbes MP of Culloden. He joined the army and was an ensign in the 10th Foot in. 1726 and lieutenant in 1731. He was sometime provost of Forres.

== Political career ==
Urquhart was returned as Member of Parliament for Inverness Burghs at a by-election on 21 July 1737 by his uncle, Duncan Forbes. In 1738 he was promoted to lieutenant and captain in the 2nd Foot Guards. In Parliament, he supported the Administration, and voted with them on the Spanish convention in 1739 and on the place bill in 1740. He did not stand at the 1741 British general election. Urquhart succeeded his father in 1741.

== Personal life ==
He died unmarried on 11 January 1742.

Parliament of Great Britain
| Preceded by Duncan Forbes | Member of Parliament for Inverness Burghs; 1737–1741 | Succeeded by Kenneth Mackenzie |
