= Edward Popham (died 1772) =

English politician

Edward Popham (?1711-72), of Littlecote, Wiltshire, was an English politician.

He was a Member (MP) of the Parliament of Great Britain for Great Bedwyn 5 April 1738 - 1741 and for Wiltshire 1741 to 1772.
