= Sir James Hamilton, 2nd Baronet, of Rosehall =

Sir James Hamilton, 2nd Bt. (1682–1750), of Rosehall, Lanark, was Member of Parliament for Lanarkshire, in the British Parliament and a Jacobite.

James Hamilton, baptized on 24 November 1682, was the third, but eldest surviving son of Sir Archibald Hamilton, 1st Bt., of Rosehall by his 2nd wife Bethia, daughter of Sir Patrick Murray of Deuchar, Forfar. James married on 2 March 1707, Frances, daughter of Alexander Stuart, 4th Lord Blantyre He succeeded his father as 2nd Bt. in November 1709.

A Lanarkshire Justice of the Peace, he was returned Member of Parliament without a contest for Lanarkshire in 1710 with the support of the Duke of Hamilton. He was largely inactive and did not stand for re-election in 1715. However, he returned to Parliament in 1735 until he died in 1750.

He died childless on 15 March 1750 and the estate and baronetcy passed to his brother Hugh, who died unmarried in 1755. The title became extinct and Rosehall passed first to Hamilton's half-sister, Margaret, and thereafter to her eldest son, Archibald Hamilton of Dalzell.

Baronetage of Nova Scotia
Preceded by Archibald Hamilton	Baronet (of Rosehall); 1709–1750	Succeeded by Hugh Hamilton
