= Robert Williams (died 1763) =

Welsh politician, died 1763

Robert Williams (c. 1695–1763), of Erbistock, Denbighshire, was a Welsh politician.

Williams was the second son of Sir William Williams, 2nd Baronet. He was a member (MP) of the parliament of England for Montgomeryshire on 12 December 1740 – 1741 and 2 April 1742 – 1747.
