= List of Great Britain by-elections (1707–1715) =

This is a list of parliamentary by-elections in Great Britain held between 1707 and 1715, with the names of the previous incumbent and the victor in the by-election.

In the absence of a comprehensive and reliable source, for party and factional alignments in this period, no attempt is made to define them in this article. The House of Commons: 1690-1715 provides some guidance to the complex and shifting political relationships, but it is significant that the compilers of that work make no attempt to produce a definitive list of each members allegiances.

== Resignations ==
See Resignation from the British House of Commons for more details.

Where the cause of by-election is given as "resignation", this indicates that the incumbent was appointed to an "office of profit under the Crown" causing him to vacate his seat and prohibited membership in the House of Commons. This office is noted in brackets.

In addition certain offices of profit, such as cabinet positions, required the MP to seek re-election. These offices are noted separately.

== Dates ==
During this period England (but not Scotland) counted its legal year as beginning on 25 March. For the purposes of this list the year is considered to have started on 1 January.

== By-elections ==
The c/u column denotes whether the by-election was a contested poll or an unopposed return. If the winner was re-elected, at the next general election and any intermediate by-elections, this is indicated by an * following the c or u. In a few cases the winner was elected at the next general election but had not been re-elected in a by-election after the one noted. In those cases no * symbol is used.

=== 1st Parliament (1707–1708) ===
Date	Constituency	c/u	Former Incumbent	Winner	Cause
21 November 1707	Amersham	u	The Viscount Newhaven	John Drake	Ineligible to sit due to holding a Scottish Peerage
21 November 1707	Ipswich	c*	Henry Poley	William Churchill	Death
21 November 1707	Liskeard	u*	Thomas Dodson	John Dolben	Death
21 November 1707	St Mawes	u*	Joseph Tredenham	John Tredenham	Death
22 November 1707	Scarborough	u*	Robert Squire	John Hungerford	Death
28 November 1707	New Romney	u*	John Brewer	John Brewer	Receiver General of Prizes
29 November 1707	Aldborough	u*	William Jessop	William Jessop	Justice of the Anglesey Circuit
29 November 1707	Chipping Wycombe	u*	Fleetwood Dormer	Fleetwood Dormer	Commissioner of Prizes
29 November 1707	Great Bedwyn	c	Nicholas Pollexfen	Tracy Pauncefort	Commissioner of Prizes
29 November 1707	Great Bedwyn	c	Tracy Pauncefort	Nicholas Pollexfen	By-election result reversed on petition 22 December 1707
29 November 1707	Reigate	u*	Stephen Hervey	James Cocks	Death
1 December 1707	Hedon	u	Anthony Duncombe	Anthony Duncombe	Commissioner of Prizes
2 December 1707	Lymington	u*	Paul Burrard, junior	Paul Burrard, junior	Sub-Commissioner of Prizes at Portsmouth
2 December 1707	Rye	u*	Philip Herbert	Phillips Gybbon	Commissioner for the Sick and Wounded and for Exchange of Prisoners
3 December 1707	Suffolk	c	The Earl of Dysart	Leicester Martin	Ineligible to sit due to holding a Scottish Peerage
3 December 1707	Worcestershire	u*	William Bromley	Sir Thomas Cookes Winford	Death
3 December 1707	Yorkshire	u*	Marquess of Hartington	The Viscount Downe	Succeeded to a peerage
3 December 1707	Yorkshire	u	The Lord Fairfax of Cameron	Conyers Darcy	Ineligible to sit due to holding a Scottish Peerage
4 December 1707	Cambridgeshire	u*	John Bromley (the elder)	John Bromley (the younger)	Death
4 December 1707	Leicestershire	c	John Verney	George Ashby	Death
15 December 1707	Bedford	u*	Sir Philip Monoux	William Hillersden	Death
16 December 1707	City of London	c*	Sir Robert Clayton	Sir William Withers	Death
29 December 1707	Bramber	u*	John Asgill	William Shippen	Expulsion
3 January 1708	Rochester	u*	Sir Cloudesley Shovell	Sir John Leake	Death
17 January 1708	Whitchurch	c(*)	John Shrimpton	Frederick Tylney	Death
17 January 1708	Whitchurch	c	Frederick Tylney	Charles Wither	By-election result reversed on petition 17 February 1708
21 January 1708	Ashburton	c*	Gilbert Yarde	Roger Tuckfield	Death
31 January 1708	Huntingdonshire	u*	John Dryden	John Proby	Death
21 February 1708	Westminster	u*	Henry Boyle	Henry Boyle	Northern Secretary
2 March 1708	Sandwich	u*	Josiah Burchett	Josiah Burchett	Secretary to the Marines
6 March 1708	King's Lynn	u*	Robert Walpole	Robert Walpole	Secretary at War
13 April 1708	Exeter	c*	Sir Edward Seymour	John Harris	Death

=== 2nd Parliament (1708–1710) ===
Date	Constituency	c/u	Former Incumbent	Winner	Cause
3 December 1708	Cricklade	u*	Edmund Dunch	Edmund Dunch	Master of the Household
4 December 1708	Salisbury	u	Robert Eyre	Robert Eyre	Solicitor General for England and Wales
6 December 1708	Harwich	c(*)	Sir John Leake	Kenrick Edisbury	Chose to sit for Rochester (Two MPs elected due to a tie)
6 December 1708	Harwich	c(*)	Sir John Leake	Sir Thomas Davall	Chose to sit for Rochester (Two MPs elected due to a tie)
6 December 1708	Lewes	u	Peter Gott	Samuel Gott	Chose to sit for Sussex
7 December 1708	Arundel	u	Sir Henry Peachey, Bt	Viscount Lumley	Chose to sit for Sussex
7 December 1708	Saltash	u*	James Buller	Sir Cholmeley Dering	Chose to sit for Cornwall
9 December 1708	Bury St Edmunds	u	Sir Thomas Felton	Sir Thomas Felton	Comptroller of the Household
10 December 1708	Marlborough	c	Earl of Hertford	Sir Edward Ernle	Chose to sit for Northumberland
11 December 1708	Southampton	c	Viscount Woodstock	Simeon Stuart	Chose to sit for Hampshire
13 December 1708	Haslemere	u*	Thomas Onslow	Nicholas Carew	Chose to sit for Bletchingley
13 December 1708	Weobley	c	Henry Thynne	Henry Gorges	Chose to sit for Weymouth
14 December 1708	Portsmouth	u	Thomas Erle	Sir Thomas Littleton	Chose to sit for Wareham
14 December 1708	Wigtown Burghs	u*	George Lockhart	William Cochrane	Chose to sit for Edinburghshire
15 December 1708	Carlisle	u*	Sir James Montagu	Sir James Montagu	Attorney General for England and Wales
15 December 1708	Helston	u	Viscount Rialton	John Evelyn	Chose to sit for Oxfordshire
16 December 1708	Truro	u	James Brydges	Robert Furnese	Chose to sit for Hereford
18 December 1708	New Shoreham	c*	Anthony Hammond	Gregory Page	Ineligible to sit (Commissioner of the Navy)
20 December 1708	Winchelsea	u*	George Dodington	Robert Bristow	Chose to sit for Bridgwater
22 December 1708	Linlithgowshire	u*	Lord Johnston	John Houstoun	Eldest son of a Scottish Peer
18 January 1709	Aberdeenshire	c*	Lord Haddo	Sir Alexander Cumming	Eldest son of a Scottish Peer
24 January 1709	Harwich	u*	Kenrick Edisbury	Kenrick Edisbury	Previous by-election voided due to a Double Return
24 January 1709	Harwich	u*	Sir Thomas Davall	Kenrick Edisbury	Previous by-election voided due to a Double Return
24 January 1709	Weymouth and Melcombe Regis	u	Henry Thynne	Edward Clavell	Death
1 February 1709	Steyning	c(*)	Viscount Tunbridge	Harry Goring	Succeeded to a peerage (Two MPs Elected due to a Double Return)
1 February 1709	Steyning	c(*)	Viscount Tunbridge	The Lord Bellew of Duleek	Succeeded to a peerage (Two MPs Elected due to a Double Return)
1 February 1709	Steyning	c*	Harry Goring	Harry Goring	Goring Declared Elected 15 February 1709
1 February 1709	Steyning	c*	The Lord Bellew of Duleek	Harry Goring	Goring Declared Elected 15 February 1709
22 February 1709	Wallingford	c*	William Jennens	Thomas Renda	Death
2 March 1709	Bewdley	u	Henry Herbert	Charles Cornwall	Succeeded to a peerage
3 March 1709	Middlesex	u	Sir John Wolstenholme	John Austen	Death
12 March 1709	Arundel	c*	The Viscount Shannon	The Viscount Shannon	Deputy Governor of Dover Castle
26 March 1709	Bury St Edmunds	u*	Sir Thomas Felton	Joseph Weld	Death
7 April 1709	Dumfriesshire	u*	Lord Johnston	William Grierson	Eldest son of a Scottish Peer
27 April 1709	Norfolk	u	Sir John Holland	Sir John Holland	Comptroller of the Household
5 May 1709	Tain Burghs	u	Lord Strathnaver	Robert Douglas	Eldest son of a Scottish Peer
6 May 1709	Thirsk	u	Sir Godfrey Copley	Leonard Smelt	Death
7 May 1709	Milborne Port	u	Thomas Medlycott	Thomas Smith	Chose to sit for Westminster
20 November 1709	Malton	u*	William Strickland	William Strickland	Irish Revenue Commissioner
21 November 1709	Wendover	u*	Thomas Ellys	Henry Grey	Death
25 November 1709	Edinburgh	u*	Sir Samuel MacClellan	Sir Patrick Johnston	Death
25 November 1709	Rochester	u*	Sir John Leake	Sir John Leake	Naval Lord
25 November 1709	Stafford	u*	Walter Chetwynd	Walter Chetwynd	Master of the Buckhounds
28 November 1709	Brecon	u*	Sir Jeffrey Jeffreys	Edward Jeffreys	Death
29 November 1709	Great Yarmouth	u	Roger Townshend	Nathaniel Symonds	Death
1 December 1709	Okehampton	u*	William Harris	Christopher Harris	Death
2 December 1709	Bridgwater	u*	George Dodington	George Dodington	Lord of the Admiralty
2 December 1709	Dover	u	Matthew Aylmer	Matthew Aylmer	Admiral and Commander in Chief of the Fleet
2 December 1709	Plymouth	u*	Sir George Byng	Sir George Byng	Naval Lord
5 December 1709	Dorchester	u	John Churchill	Denis Bond	Death
7 December 1709	Aylesbury	c	Sir John Wittewrong	Sir John Wittewrong	Accepted a Commission in the Army
8 December 1709	Northumberland	u*	Earl of Hertford	Earl of Hertford	Accepted a Commission in the Army
14 December 1709	Gloucester	c	William Cooke	Francis Wyndham	Death
15 December 1709	Haddington Burghs	u*	Sir David Dalrymple	Sir David Dalrymple	Lord Advocate
21 December 1709	Hampshire	u	Viscount Woodstock	Thomas Jervoise	Succeeded to a peerage
23 December 1709	Cirencester	c*	Allen Bathurst	Allen Bathurst	Void Election
23 December 1709	Cirencester	c*	Charles Coxe	Charles Coxe	Void Election
28 December 1709	Devizes	u(*)	Paul Methuen	Paul Methuen	Lord of the Admiralty
3 January 1710	Shrewsbury	c	Richard Mytton	Thomas Jones	On petition both members were unseated and replaced by Sir Edward Leighton. A by-election was held for the second seat
3 January 1710	Shrewsbury	c	John Kynaston	Thomas Jones	On petition both members were unseated and replaced by Sir Edward Leighton. A by-election was held for the second seat
7 January 1710	Hythe	u*	John Fane	John Fane	Commission in the Army
11 January 1710	Kent	u	Sir Stephen Lennard	David Polhill	Death
16 January 1710	Dysart Burghs	u	John St Clair	James Abercrombie	Eldest son of a Scottish Peer
23 January 1710	Portsmouth	c*	Sir Thomas Littleton	Sir Charles Wager	Death
4 February 1710	King's Lynn	u*	Robert Walpole	Robert Walpole	Treasurer of the Navy
10 February 1710	Hastings	u	William Ashburnham	John Ashburnham	Succeeded to a peerage
10 February 1710	Lostwithiel	u	Russell Robartes	Horatio Walpole	Chose to sit for Bodmin
22 February 1710	Cambridge	c*	Samuel Shepheard	Samuel Shepheard	Void Election
22 February 1710	Cardigan Boroughs	c	Lewis Pryse	Simon Harcourt	Chose to sit for Cardiganshire
22 February 1710	Oxfordshire	c*	Sir Robert Jenkinson	Sir Robert Jenkinson	Death
28 February 1710	Buteshire	u	Dugald Stewart	John Montgomerie	Resignation (Lord of Session and of Judiciary)
3 March 1710	Ross-shire	c*	Hugh Rose	Charles Rosse	Void Election
6 March 1710	Liskeard	u*	William Bridges	William Bridges	Surveyor-General of the Ordnance
11 March 1710	Malmesbury	u*	Henry Mordaunt	Joseph Addison	Death
24 March 1710	Fifeshire	u	Patrick Moncreiff	Sir Robert Anstruther	Death
27 March 1710	Derby	c	Sir Thomas Parker	Richard Pye	Resignation (Lord Chief Justice of the Queen's Bench)
14 April 1710	Bedford	u*	William Farrer	William Farrer	Clerk of the Pipe
26 April 1710	Somerset	u*	John Prowse	Sir William Wyndham	Death

=== 3rd Parliament (1710–1713) ===
Date	Constituency	c/u	Former Incumbent	Winner	Cause
5 December 1710	Horsham	u*	Charles Eversfield	John Middleton	Chose to sit for Sussex
8 December 1710	Bramber	u	The Viscount Windsor	William Shippen	Chose to sit for Monmouthshire
11 December 1710	Castle Rising	u*	Robert Walpole	Horatio Walpole	Chose to sit for King's Lynn
12 December 1710	Andover	u	John Smith	John Smith	Teller of the Exchequer
12 December 1710	Thetford	u	Sir Thomas Hanmer	Sir Edmund Bacon	Chose to sit for Suffolk
13 December 1710	Abingdon	u	Sir Simon Harcourt	James Jennings	Appointed Lord Keeper of the Great Seal
13 December 1710	Wareham	u	George Pitt	Sir Edward Ernle	Chose to sit for Hampshire
13 December 1710	Warwick	c	Francis Greville	Charles Leigh	Death
14 December 1710	Wootton Bassett	u*	Henry St. John	Edmund Pleydell	Chose to sit for Berkshire
16 December 1710	Tiverton	c*	John Worth	John Worth	Election voided due to Treble Return
16 December 1710	Tiverton	c*	Thomas Bere	Sir Edward Northey	Election voided due to Treble Return
16 December 1710	Tiverton	c*	Richard Mervin	Sir Edward Northey	Election voided due to Treble Return
19 December 1710	Saltash	u*	Sir Cholmeley Dering	Jonathan Elford	Chose to sit for Kent
22 December 1710	Bossiney	u	Francis Robartes	Henry Campion	Chose to sit for Bodmin
22 December 1710	Helston	u	George Granville	Robert Child	Chose to sit for Cornwall
22 December 1710	Newport (I.o.w.)	u	John Richmond Webb	William Seymour	Chose to sit for Ludgershall
23 December 1710	Tregony	c	John Trevanion	George Robinson	Chose to sit for Cornwall
26 December 1710	Coventry	u	Robert Craven	Clobery Bromley	Death
30 December 1710	Huntingdonshire	u	John Proby	Sir John Cotton	Death
2 January 1711	Newtown	u*	James Worsley	James Worsley	Woodward of New Forest
17 January 1711	Saltash	u	Alexander Pendarves	Sir William Carew	Chose to sit for Penryn
20 January 1711	St Mawes	u	John Tredenham	John Anstis	Death
1 February 1711	Carlisle	u*	Thomas Stanwix	Thomas Stanwix	Governor of Gibraltar
21 February 1711	Portsmouth	u*	Sir James Wishart	Sir James Wishart	Naval Lord
22 February 1711	Leicestershire	u*	Marquess of Granby	Sir Thomas Cave	Succeeded to a peerage
26 February 1711	Oxford	u*	Sir John Walter	Sir John Walter	Clerk Comptroller of the Green Cloth
7 March 1711	Poole	u*	Thomas Ridge	William Lewen	Expulsion
26 March 1711	Camelford	c	Jasper Radcliffe	Henry Manaton	Death
26 March 1711	Camelford	c	Henry Manaton	Paul Orchard	By-election result reversed on petition 8 May 1711
26 March 1711	Shaftesbury	u*	Edward Seymour	Henry Whitaker	Death
30 March 1711	Ashburton	u	George Courtenay	Andrew Quick	Chose to sit for Newport (Cornwall)
2 April 1711	Stamford	u*	Charles Bertie	Charles Bertie	Death
18 April 1711	Weymouth and Melcombe Regis	c(*)	James Littleton	James Littleton	Void Election
18 April 1711	Weymouth and Melcombe Regis	c(*)	William Betts	William Betts	Void Election
18 April 1711	Weymouth and Melcombe Regis	c(*)	James Littleton	Thomas Hardy	By-election results reversed on petition 22 May 1711
18 April 1711	Weymouth and Melcombe Regis	c(*)	William Betts	William Harvey	By-election results reversed on petition 22 May 1711
24 April 1711	Coventry	u*	Clobery Bromley	Sir Christopher Hales	Death
25 April 1711	Dorset	u	Thomas Chafin	Richard Bingham	Death
30 April 1711	Maldon	u	Thomas Richmond	William Fytche	Death
9 May 1711	Downton	u	Sir Charles Duncombe	Thomas Duncombe	Death
15 May 1711	Cockermouth	c	James Stanhope	James Stanhope	Void Election
15 May 1711	Hindon	u	George Morley	Henry Lee Warner	Death
18 May 1711	New Windsor	u	William Paul	Samuel Masham	Death
29 May 1711	Launceston	u	Lord Hyde	George Clarke	Succeeded to a peerage
29 May 1711	Northumberland	u*	Earl of Hertford	Earl of Hertford	Governor of Tynemouth Castle
2 June 1711	Ilchester	u*	Samuel Masham	Sir James Bateman	Cofferer of the Household
13 June 1711	Kent	u	Sir Cholmeley Dering	Sir William Hardres	Death
16 June 1711	Great Bedwyn	u*	Lord Bruce	Thomas Millington	Chose to sit for Marlborough
20 June 1711	Surrey	u*	Heneage Finch	Heneage Finch	Master of the Jewel Office
21 June 1711	Hertford	u*	Charles Caesar	Charles Caesar	Treasurer of the Navy
21 June 1711	Thirsk	u	Sir Thomas Frankland	Thomas Worsley	Resignation (Joint-Postmaster General)
26 June 1711	Ilchester	u*	Edward Phelips	Edward Phelips	Comptroller of the Mint
26 June 1711	Totnes	u*	Francis Gwyn	Francis Gwyn	Lord of Trade
2 July 1711	Somerset	u*	Sir William Wyndham	Sir William Wyndham	Master of the Buckhounds
3 July 1711	Newton	u*	John Ward	John Ward	Puisne Justice of Chester
4 July 1711	York	u	Robert Benson	Robert Benson	Chancellor of the Exchequer
16 July 1711	New Radnor Boroughs	u*	Robert Harley	Lord Harley	Elevated to the peerage
18 July 1711	Droitwich	u*	Edward Foley	Edward Jeffreys	Resignation (Receiver-General of the Leather Duty)
18 July 1711	Droitwich	u*	Edward Jeffreys	Richard Foley	Puisne Justice of the Great Sessions for Carmarthenshire, Cardiganshire, and Pembrokeshire
18 July 1711	Glamorganshire	u	Sir Thomas Mansel	Sir Thomas Mansel	Teller of the Exchequer
13 December 1711	Staffordshire	u	Henry Paget	Henry Paget	Captain of the Yeomen of the Guard
17 December 1711	Canterbury	u*	Henry Lee	Henry Lee	Victualling Commissioner
18 December 1711	Fowey	u	Henry Vincent (junior)	Henry Vincent (junior)	Victualling Commissioner
18 December 1711	Fowey	u	Viscount Dupplin	Viscount Dupplin	Teller of the Exchequer
20 December 1711	Boston	c*	Peregrine Bertie	William Cotesworth	Death
21 December 1711	Weymouth and Melcombe Regis	u	Anthony Henley	Reginald Marriott	Death
22 December 1711	Berwick-upon-Tweed	c*	Jonathan Hutchinson	Richard Hampden	Death
26 December 1711	Chester	u*	Sir Henry Bunbury	Sir Henry Bunbury	Irish Revenue Commissioner
26 December 1711	Flintshire	u	Sir Roger Mostyn	Sir Roger Mostyn	Paymaster of Marines
26 December 1711	Selkirkshire	u*	John Pringle	John Pringle	Joint-Keeper of the Signet
27 December 1711	Derby	u*	Sir Richard Levinge	Edward Mundy	Appointed Attorney General for Ireland
27 December 1711	Newport (Cornwall)	u	George Courtenay	George Courtenay	Victualling Commissioner
27 December 1711	Stirlingshire	u*	Sir Hugh Paterson	Sir Hugh Paterson	Commissioner of Chamberlainry and Trade
28 December 1711	Midhurst	c*	Robert Orme	John Pratt	Death
31 December 1711	Shaftesbury	u*	Edward Nicholas	Edward Nicholas	Commissioner of the Privy Seal
1 January 1712	Tewkesbury	u*	Henry Ireton	William Dowdeswell	Death
4 January 1712	Leicester	u*	Sir George Beaumont	Sir George Beaumont	Commissioner of the Privy Seal
8 January 1712	Peeblesshire	c	Alexander Murray	Alexander Murray	Commissioner of Chamberlainry and Trade
9 January 1712	Knaresborough	u*	Robert Byerley	Robert Byerley	Commissioner of the Privy Seal
10 January 1712	Wigtown Burghs	u	William Cochrane	William Cochrane	Joint-Keeper of the Signet
12 January 1712	Southwark	c	John Cholmley	Edmund Halsey	Death
12 January 1712	Southwark	c	Edmund Halsey	Sir George Matthews	By-election results reversed on petition 7 February 1712
21 January 1712	New Windsor	c*	Samuel Masham	Charles Aldworth	Elevated to the peerage
23 January 1712	Cirencester	u*	Allen Bathurst	Thomas Master	Elevated to the peerage
23 January 1712	Marlborough	c	Lord Bruce	Richard Jones	Elevated to the House of Lords through a Writ of acceleration
24 January 1712	Stafford	u*	Thomas Foley	Walter Chetwynd	Elevated to the peerage
28 January 1712	Maldon	u*	William Fytche	Thomas Bramston	Resignation (Comptroller of Lotteries)
28 January 1712	Newark	c*	Sir Thomas Willoughby	Richard Sutton	Elevated to the peerage
30 January 1712	Glamorganshire	u*	Sir Thomas Mansel	Robert Jones	Elevated to the peerage
31 January 1712	Warwickshire	u	Lord Compton	Sir William Boughton	Elevated to the House of Lords through a Writ of acceleration
7 February 1712	Staffordshire	u	Henry Paget	Charles Bagot	Elevated to the peerage
11 February 1712	Callington	u	Sir William Coryton	Henry Manaton	Death
11 February 1712	Fowey	u	Viscount Dupplin	Bernard Granville	Elevated to the peerage
11 February 1712	King's Lynn	c	Robert Walpole	Robert Walpole	Expulsion
16 February 1712	Steyning	c	William Wallis	The Lord Bellew of Duleek	Void Election
18 February 1712	Monmouthshire	u	The Viscount Windsor	James Gunter	Became a British Peer
20 February 1712	Bury St Edmunds	u	Joseph Weld	Samuel Batteley	Death
20 February 1712	Camelford	u*	Bernard Granville	Sir Bourchier Wrey	Appointed Lieutenant-Governor of Kingston-upon-Hull
20 February 1712	Cornwall	u	George Granville	Sir Richard Vyvyan	Elevated to the peerage
3 March 1712	City Durham	u	Sir Henry Belasyse	Robert Shafto	Expulsion (Commissioner of an inquiry into forces and garrisons in Italy, Portugal and Spain)
6 March 1712	Southampton	u*	Adam de Cardonnel	Roger Harris	Expulsion
15 March 1712	Launceston	u	Francis Scobell	Francis Scobell	Receiver General of Cornwall
17 March 1712	Cardigan Boroughs	u	John Meyrick	Owen Brigstocke	Appointed Puisne Judge of the Anglesey Circuit
2 April 1712	Boston	c	William Cotesworth	William Cotesworth	Previous by-election declared void
7 April 1712	King's Lynn	u	Robert Walpole	John Turner	Void Election. Walpole declared incapable of being re-elected
5 May 1712	Lewes	u*	Peter Gott	John Morley Trevor	Death
2 July 1712	Scarborough	u*	John Hungerford	John Hungerford	Commissioner of the Alienation Office
9 July 1712	Lostwithiel	u	John Hill	John Hill	Lieutenant-General of the Ordnance
13 July 1712	Somerset	u*	Sir William Wyndham	Sir William Wyndham	Secretary at War
16 July 1712	Hereford	u*	Thomas Foley	Thomas Foley	Lord of Trade
18 July 1712	Cambridge	u*	John Hynde Cotton	John Hynde Cotton	Lord of Trade
18 July 1712	Cambridge University	u*	Dixie Windsor	Dixie Windsor	Storekeeper of the Ordnance
18 July 1712	Newport (I.o.w.)	u*	William Stephens	William Stephens	Victualling Commissioner
22 July 1712	Devon	c*	Sir William Pole	Sir William Courtenay	Master of the Household
23 July 1712	Berkshire	u*	Henry St John	Robert Packer	Elevated to the peerage
25 July 1712	Hythe	u	William Berners	The Viscount Shannon	Death
30 July 1712	Hampshire	u	Sir Simeon Stuart	Sir Simeon Stuart	Chamberlain of the Exchequer
30 July 1712	Herefordshire	u*	John Prise	Sir Thomas Morgan	Resignation (Commissioner of Excise)
7 August 1712	Sussex	u	Charles Eversfield	Charles Eversfield	Paymaster and Treasurer of the Ordnance
15 April 1713	Westminster	u*	Thomas Medlycott	Thomas Medlycott	Irish Revenue Commissioner
17 April 1713	Sandwich	u*	Sir Henry Furnese	John Michel	Death
20 April 1713	Malmesbury	u*	Thomas Farrington	Sir John Rushout	Death
20 April 1713	New Romney	u*	Walter Whitfield	Edward Watson	Death
20 April 1713	West Looe	u*	Arthur Maynwaring	John Trelawny	Death
22 April 1713	Castle Rising	u	Horatio Walpole	Horatio Walpole	Irish Revenue Commissioner
22 April 1713	East Retford	u*	Willoughby Hickman	Francis Lewis	Death
22 April 1713	Wigan	u*	Henry Bradshaigh	George Kenyon	Death
23 April 1713	Clitheroe	u*	Christopher Parker	Thomas Lister	Death
23 April 1713	Tregony	c	Viscount Rialton	Edward Southwell	Succeeded to a peerage
24 April 1713	Steyning	u	The Lord Bellew of Duleek	Robert Leeves	Previous by-election declared void
30 April 1713	Monmouthshire	u	James Gunter	Thomas Lewis	Death
9 May 1713	Dumfries Burghs	u*	John Hutton	Sir William Johnstone	Death

=== 4th Parliament (1713–1715) ===
Date	Constituency	c/u	Former Incumbent	Winner	Cause
12 March 1714	Guildford	c*	Sir Richard Onslow	Denzil Onslow	Chose to sit for Surrey
12 March 1714	Higham Ferrers	u*	Thomas Watson Wentworth	Charles Leigh	Chose to sit for Malton
13 March 1714	Wendover	u	Richard Hampden	James Stanhope	Chose to sit for Berwick-upon-Tweed
15 March 1714	Knaresborough	u	Christopher Stockdale	Francis Fawkes	Death
15 March 1714	Ripon	u	John Sharp	John Sharp	Lord of Trade
15 March 1714	Salisbury	u	Charles Fox	Sir Stephen Fox	Death
15 March 1714	Penryn	c*	Alexander Pendarves	Samuel Trefusis	Surveyor General of Crown Lands
15 March 1714	Winchester	u*	George Rodney Brydges	George Brydges	Death
15 March 1714	Winchester	u	Thomas Lewis	John Popham	Chose to sit for Hampshire
15 March 1714	Wallingford	c	Simon Harcourt	Thomas Renda	Chose to sit for Abingdon
16 March 1714	Whitchurch	u*	Thomas Vernon	Thomas Vernon	Lord of Trade
17 March 1714	Haslemere	u*	Thomas Onslow	Nicholas Carew	Chose to sit for Bletchingley
17 March 1714	Much Wenlock	u*	William Whitmore	Richard Newport	Chose to sit for Bridgnorth
18 March 1714	Amersham	u	The Viscount Fermanagh	James Herbert	Chose to sit for Buckinghamshire
18 March 1714	Hastings	c	Sir Joseph Martin	Sir Joseph Martin	Commissary for Commercial Negotiations with France
20 March 1714	Dartmouth	u*	Frederick Herne	John Fownes	Commissioner for Settling Trade with France and Death
22 March 1714	Bossiney	u	John Manley	Paul Orchard	Death
24 March 1714	Ludgershall	c	John Richmond Webb	John Ward	Chose to sit for Newport (I.o.w.)
24 March 1714	New Woodstock	u*	William Cadogan	William Cadogan	Void Election
24 March 1714	New Woodstock	u*	Sir Thomas Wheate	Sir Thomas Wheate	Void Election
30 March 1714	Andover	u	Sir Ambrose Crowley	Gilbert Searle	Death
5 April 1714	Elgin Burghs	u*	James Murray	James Murray	Commissary for Commercial Negotiations with France
12 April 1714	Helston	c	Charles Coxe	Thomas Tonkin	Chose to sit for Gloucester
12 April 1714	Helston	c	Henry Campion	Alexander Pendarves	Chose to sit for Sussex
15 April 1714	Forfarshire	u*	John Carnegie	John Carnegie	Solicitor General for Scotland
22 April 1714	Leicester	u*	Sir George Beaumont	Sir George Beaumont	Lord of the Admiralty
30 April 1714	Stockbridge	u	Richard Steele	The Earl of Barrymore	Expulsion
3 May 1714	Southwark	c*	John Lade	John Lade	Void Election
3 May 1714	Southwark	c*	Fisher Tench	Fisher Tench	Void Election
4 May 1714	Droitwich	u*	Edward Jeffreys	Edward Jeffreys	Puisne Justice of Chester
7 May 1714	Sutherland	u*	William Morison	Sir William Gordon	Chose to sit for Peeblesshire
17 May 1714	Harwich	c(*)	Thomas Davall	Thomas Heath	Death
17 May 1714	Harwich	c	Thomas Heath	Benedict Calvert	By-election result reversed on petition 29 June 1714
17 May 1714	Knaresborough	u	Robert Byerley	Henry Slingsby	Death
1 June 1714	Cricklade	c	William Gore	Samuel Robinson	Chose to sit for Colchester
5 June 1714	Leicestershire	u*	Viscount Tamworth	Sir Geoffrey Palmer	Death
18 June 1714	Tewkesbury	c*	Charles Dowdeswell	Anthony Lechmere	Death
12 August 1714	Truro	u	Thomas Hare	Thomas Hare	First Register and Clerk of the Crown in Barbados
