= List of MPs elected in the 1710 British general election =

1710–1713 Parliament of Great Britain
| ← | 1708–1710 Parliament | 1713–1715 Parliament | → |

Overview
- Legislative body: Parliament of Great Britain
- Meeting place: Palace of Westminster
- Term: 25 November 1710 – 8 August 1713
- Election: 1710 British general election
- Government: Harley ministry

House of Commons
- Members: 558
- Speaker: William Bromley
- Chief minister: Robert Harley

House of Lords
- Lord Chancellor: Viscount Harcourt

Crown-in-Parliament Anne

Sessions
- 1st: 25 November 1710 – 12 June 1711
- 2nd: 7 December 1711 – 21 June 1712
- 3rd: 9 April 1713 – 16 July 1713

This is a list of the 558 MPs or members of Parliament elected to the 314 constituencies of the Parliament of Great Britain in 1710, the 3rd Parliament of Great Britain, and their replacements returned at subsequent by-elections, arranged by constituency.

The reference, in the constituency section of the table, to the numbers of seats in a constituency has no relevance except to make clear how many members were elected in a particular constituency. Peers of Ireland are differentiated from the holders of courtesy titles by including the succession number to the peerage, i.e. The 1st Earl of Upper Ossory is an Irish peer and Viscount Dupplin is the holder of a courtesy title.

Table of contents:

A B C D E F G H I J K L M N O P Q R S T U V W X Y Z By-elections Changes

== A ==
| Aberdeen Burghs (seat 1/1) | James Scott – unseated on petition Replaced by William Livingston 1711 | ? ? |
| Aberdeenshire (seat 1/1) | Sir Alexander Cumming | Tory |
| Abingdon (seat 1/1) | Sir Simon Harcourt - ennobled Replaced 1710 by James Jennings | Tory; Tory |
| Aldborough (seat 1/2) | Robert Monckton | Whig |
| Aldborough (seat 2/2) | William Jessop | Whig |
| Aldeburgh (seat 1/2) | Sir Henry Johnson | Tory |
| Aldeburgh (seat 2/2) | William Johnson | Tory |
| Amersham (seat 1/2) | John Drake | ? |
| Amersham (seat 2/2) | Francis Duncombe | Tory |
| Andover (seat 1/2) | John Smith | Whig |
| Andover (seat 2/2) | William Guidott | Whig |
| Anglesey (seat 1/1) | The 4th Viscount Bulkeley | Tory |
| Anstruther Easter Burghs (seat 1/1) | Sir John Anstruther, Bt – unseated on petition Replaced by George Hamilton 1712 | Whig ? |
| Appleby (seat 1/2) | Edward Duncombe | Tory |
| Appleby (seat 2/2) | Thomas Lutwyche | Tory |
| Argyllshire (seat 1/1) | Sir James Campbell | Whig |
| Arundel (seat 1/2) | Viscount Lumley | Whig |
| Arundel (seat 2/2) | The 8th Earl of Thomond | Whig |
| Ashburton (seat 1/2) | Roger Tuckfield – unseated on petition Replaced by Richard Reynell 1711 | Whig; Tory |
| Ashburton (seat 2/2) | Richard Lloyd – unseated on petition Replaced by George Courtenay 1711 - sat for Newport; Replaced by Andrew Quick 1711 | Whig Tory ? |
| Aylesbury (seat 1/2) | Simon Harcourt | ? |
| Aylesbury (seat 2/2) | John Essington | ? |
| Ayr Burghs (seat 1/1) | Charles Oliphant | ? |
| Ayrshire (seat 1/1) | John Montgomerie | ? |
== B ==
| Banbury (seat 1/1) | Hon. Charles North | Tory |
| Banffshire (seat 1/1) | Alexander Abercromby | Whig |
| Barnstaple (seat 1/2) | Nicholas Hooper | Tory |
| Barnstaple (seat 2/2) | Richard Acland | Tory |
| Bath (seat 1/2) | Samuel Trotman | Tory |
| Bath (seat 2/2) | John Codrington | Tory |
| Beaumaris (seat 1/1) | Hon. Henry Bertie | Tory |
| Bedford (seat 1/2) | John Cater | Whig |
| Bedford (seat 2/2) | William Farrer | Whig |
| Bedfordshire (seat 1/2) | Lord Edward Russell | Whig |
| Bedfordshire (seat 2/2) | Sir William Gostwick, Bt | Whig |
| Bere Alston (seat 1/2) | Sir Peter King | Whig |
| Bere Alston (seat 2/2) | Lawrence Carter | Whig |
| Berkshire (seat 1/2) | Sir John Stonhouse, Bt | Tory |
| Berkshire (seat 2/2) | Henry St John – ennobled Replaced by Robert Packer 1712 | Tory Tory |
| Berwickshire (seat 1/1) | George Baillie | Whig |
| Berwick-upon-Tweed (seat 1/2) | Hon. William Kerr | Whig |
| Berwick-upon-Tweed (seat 2/2) | Jonathan Hutchinson - died Replaced by Richard Hampden 1711 | Whig Whig |
| Beverley (seat 1/2) | Sir Charles Hotham, Bt | Whig |
| Beverley (seat 2/2) | Sir Michael Warton | Tory |
| Bewdley (seat 1/1) | Anthony Lechmere - unseated on petition Replaced by Salwey Winnington 1710 | Whig Tory |
| Bishop's Castle (seat 1/2) | Robert Raymond | Tory |
| Bishop's Castle (seat 2/2) | Richard Harnage | Whig |
| Bletchingley (seat 1/2) | George Evelyn | Whig |
| Bletchingley (seat 2/2) | Thomas Onslow | Whig |
| Bodmin (seat 1/2) | Hon. Russell Robartes | Whig |
| Bodmin (seat 2/2) | Hon. Francis Robartes | Whig |
| Boroughbridge (seat 1/2) | Sir Brian Stapylton, Bt | Tory |
| Boroughbridge (seat 2/2) | Craven Peyton | Whig |
| Bossiney (seat 1/2) | Hon. Francis Robartes - sat for Bodmin. Replaced by Henry Campion 1710 | Whig; Tory |
| Bossiney (seat 2/2) | John Manley | Tory |
| Boston (seat 1/2) | Richard Wynn | Tory |
| Boston (seat 2/2) | Hon. Peregrine Bertie – died Replaced by William Cotesworth 1711 | Whig ? |
| Brackley (seat 1/2) | Hon. William Egerton | Whig |
| Brackley (seat 2/2) | Hon. Charles Egerton – unseated on petition Replaced by John Burgh 1711 | Whig ? |
| Bramber (seat 1/2) | The 1st Viscount Windsor - sat for Monmouthshire; Replaced by William Shippen 1710 | Tory Tory |
| Bramber (seat 2/2) | Hon. Andrews Windsor | Tory |
| Brecon (seat 1/1) | Edward Jeffreys | Tory |
| Breconshire (seat 1/1) | Sir Edward Williams | Tory |
| Bridgnorth (seat 1/2) | Richard Cresswell | Tory |
| Bridgnorth (seat 2/2) | Whitmore Acton | Tory |
| Bridgwater (seat 1/2) | Nathaniel Palmer | Tory |
| Bridgwater (seat 2/2) | George Dodington | Whig |
| Bridport (seat 1/2) | Thomas Strangways | Tory |
| Bridport (seat 2/2) | William Coventry | Whig |
| Bristol (seat 1/2) | Edward Colston | Tory |
| Bristol (seat 2/2) | Joseph Earle | Tory |
| Buckingham (seat 1/2) | Sir Richard Temple, Bt | Whig |
| Buckingham (seat 2/2) | Thomas Chapman | Tory |
| Buckinghamshire (seat 1/2) | The 1st Viscount Fermanagh | Tory |
| Buckinghamshire (seat 2/2) | Sir Edmund Denton, Bt | Whig |
| Bury St Edmunds (seat 1/2) | Joseph Weld – died Replaced by Samuel Batteley 1712 | Tory ? |
| Bury St Edmunds (seat 2/2) | Aubrey Porter | Ind. |
| Buteshire (seat 0/0) | Alternated with Caithness-unrepresented in this Parliament | |
== C ==
| Caernarvon Boroughs (seat 1/1) | William Griffith | Tory |
| Caernarvonshire (seat 1/1) | Sir John Wynn, Bt | Tory |
| Caithness (seat 1/1) | Hon. Sir James Dunbar, Bt | ? |
| Callington (seat 1/2) | Sir William Coryton, Bt - died Replaced by Henry Manaton 1712 | Tory; Tory |
| Callington (seat 2/2) | Samuel Rolle | Tory |
| Calne (seat 1/2) | William Hedges and Edward Bayntun - double return William Hedges elected 1710 | ? Whig (not elected) |
| Calne (seat 2/2) | James Johnston and George Duckett - double return James Johnston elected 1710 | Tory Whig (not elected) |
| Cambridge (seat 1/2) | John Hynde Cotton | Tory |
| Cambridge (seat 2/2) | Samuel Shepheard | Tory |
| Cambridgeshire (seat 1/2) | John Bromley | Tory |
| Cambridgeshire (seat 2/2) | John Jenyns | Tory |
| Cambridge University (seat 1/2) | Hon. Dixie Windsor | Tory |
| Cambridge University (seat 2/2) | Thomas Paske | Tory |
| Camelford (seat 1/2) | Bernard Granville – took office Replaced by Sir Bourchier Wrey 1712 | ? ? |
| Camelford (seat 2/2) | Jasper Radcliffe – died Replaced by Henry Manaton 1711 – unseated on petition Replaced by Paul Orchard 1711 | ? Tory ? |
| Canterbury (seat 1/2) | John Hardres | ? |
| Canterbury (seat 2/2) | Henry Lee | Tory |
| Cardiff Boroughs (seat 1/1) | Sir Edward Stradling, Bt | ? |
| Cardigan Boroughs (seat 1/1) | John Meyrick – took office Replaced by Owen Brigstocke 1712 | ? ? |
| Cardiganshire (seat 1/1) | Sir Humphrey Mackworth | Tory |
| Carlisle (seat 1/2) | Thomas Stanwix | Whig |
| Carlisle (seat 2/2) | Sir James Montagu | Whig |
| Carmarthen (seat 1/1) | Richard Vaughan | Whig |
| Carmarthenshire (seat 1/1) | Sir Thomas Powell, Bt | Tory |
| Castle Rising (seat 1/2) | Hon. William Feilding | Whig |
| Castle Rising (seat 2/2) | Robert Walpole - sat for King's Lynn; Replaced by Horatio Walpole 1710 | Whig Tory |
| Cheshire (seat 1/2) | Sir George Warburton, Bt | Tory |
| Cheshire (seat 2/2) | Charles Cholmondeley | Tory |
| Chester (seat 1/2) | Sir Henry Bunbury, Bt | Tory |
| Chester (seat 2/2) | Peter Shakerley | Tory |
| Chichester (seat 1/2) | Sir Richard Farington, Bt | Whig |
| Chichester (seat 2/2) | Sir John Miller, Bt | Tory |
| Chippenham (seat 1/2) | Sir James Long, Bt | Tory |
| Chippenham (seat 2/2) | Joseph Ashe – unseated on petition Replaced by Francis Popham 1711 | ? ? |
| Chipping Wycombe (seat 1/2) | Sir Thomas Lee, Bt | ? |
| Chipping Wycombe (seat 2/2) | Charles Godfrey | Whig |
| Christchurch (seat 1/2) | William Ettrick | Tory |
| Christchurch (seat 2/2) | Peter Mews | Tory |
| Cirencester (seat 1/2) | Allen Bathurst – ennobled Replaced by Thomas Master 1712 | Tory; Tory |
| Cirencester (seat 2/2) | Charles Coxe | Tory |
| Clackmannanshire (seat 0/0) | Alternated with Kinross-shire and unrepresented in this Parliament | |
| Clitheroe (seat 1/2) | Christopher Parker – died Replaced by Thomas Lister 1713 | Tory; Tory |
| Clitheroe (seat 2/2) | Edward Harvey | Tory |
| Cockermouth (seat 1/2) | Nicholas Lechmere | Whig |
| Cockermouth (seat 2/2) | James Stanhope | Whig |
| Colchester (seat 1/2) | Sir Isaac Rebow | Whig |
| Colchester (seat 2/2) | Sir Thomas Webster, Bt – unseated on petition Replaced by William Gore 1711 | Whig Tory |
| Corfe Castle (seat 1/2) | John Bankes | Tory |
| Corfe Castle (seat 2/2) | Richard Fownes | Tory |
| Cornwall (seat 1/2) | George Granville – ennobled Replaced by Sir Richard Vyvyan 1712 | Tory ? |
| Cornwall (seat 2/2) | John Trevanion | Tory |
| Coventry (seat 1/2) | Robert Craven died Replaced by Clobery Bromley 1710 – died Replaced by Sir Christopher Hales 1711 | Tory Tory ? |
| Coventry (seat 2/2) | Thomas Gery | ? |
| Cricklade (seat 1/2) | Edmund Dunch | Whig |
| Cricklade (seat 2/2) | Samuel Robinson | ? |
| Cromartyshire (seat 1/1) | Hon. Sir Kenneth Mackenzie, Bt | ? |
| Cumberland (seat 1/2) | James Lowther | Whig |
| Cumberland (seat 2/2) | Gilfrid Lawson | Tory |
== D ==
| Dartmouth (seat 1/2) | Nathaniel Herne | Tory |
| Dartmouth (seat 2/2) | Frederick Herne | Tory |
| Denbigh Boroughs (seat 1/1) | John Roberts | Tory |
| Denbighshire (seat 1/1) | Sir Richard Myddelton, Bt | Tory |
| Derby (seat 1/2) | Sir Richard Levinge, Bt – took office Replaced by Edward Mundy 1711 | ? ? |
| Derby (seat 2/2) | John Harpur | ? |
| Derbyshire (seat 1/2) | John Curzon | Tory |
| Derbyshire (seat 2/2) | Godfrey Clarke | Tory |
| Devizes (seat 1/2) | Sir Francis Child | Tory |
| Devizes (seat 2/2) | Thomas Richmond Webb | ? |
| Devon (seat 1/2) | Sir William Pole, Bt took office Replaced by Sir William Courtenay 1712 | Tory; Tory |
| Devon (seat 2/2) | John Rolle | Tory |
| Dorchester (seat 1/2) | Sir Nathaniel Napier, Bt | ? |
| Dorchester (seat 2/2) | Nathaniel Napier | ? |
| Dorset (seat 1/2) | Thomas Strangways | Tory |
| Dorset (seat 2/2) | Thomas Chafin -died Replaced by Richard Bingham 1711 | Tory ? |
| Dover (seat 1/2) | Sir William Hardres, Bt | Tory |
| Dover (seat 2/2) | Philip Papillon | Whig |
| Downton (seat 1/2) | Sir Charles Duncombe – died Replaced by Thomas Duncombe 1711 | Tory; Tory |
| Downton (seat 2/2) | John Eyre | Whig |
| Droitwich (seat 1/2) | Edward Foley – took office Replaced by Edward Jeffreys 1711 | Tory; Tory |
| Droitwich (seat 2/2) | Edward Jeffreys – took office Replaced by Richard Foley 1711 | Tory; Tory |
| Dumfries Burghs (seat 1/1) | John Hutton - died Replaced by Sir William Johnstone 1713 | ? ? |
| Dumfriesshire (seat 1/1) | Sir William Grierson, Bt – unseated on petition Replaced by James Murray 1711 | Tory; Tory |
| Dunbartonshire (seat 1/1) | Hon. John Campbell | Whig |
| Dunwich (seat 1/2) | Sir George Downing, Bt | Tory |
| Dunwich (seat 2/2) | Richard Richardson | ? |
| Durham (City of) (seat 1/2) | Thomas Conyers | Tory |
| Durham (City of) (seat 2/2) | Henry Belasyse – expelled Replaced by Robert Shafto 1712 | Tory Tory |
| Durham (County) (seat 1/2) | Sir Robert Eden, Bt | Tory |
| Durham (County) (seat 2/2) | William Lambton | ? |
| Dysart Burghs (seat 1/1) | James Oswald | Tory |
== E ==
| East Grinstead (seat 1/2) | John Conyers | ? |
| East Grinstead (seat 2/2) | Leonard Gale | ? |
| East Looe (seat 1/2) | Sir Henry Seymour | Tory |
| East Looe (seat 2/2) | Thomas Smith | Whig |
| East Retford (seat 1/2) | Thomas White – unseated on petition Replaced by Bryan Cooke 1711 | Whig ? |
| East Retford (seat 2/2) | Thomas Westby – unseated on petition Replaced by Willoughby Hickman 1711– died Replaced by Francis Lewis 1713 | ? Tory ? |
| Edinburgh (seat 1/1) | Patrick Johnston | Whig |
| Edinburghshire (seat 1/1) | George Lockhart | Tory |
| Elgin Burghs (seat 1/1) | Alexander Reid, Bt. | ? |
| Elginshire (seat 1/1) | Alexander Grant | Whig |
| Essex (seat 1/2) | Richard Child | Tory |
| Essex (seat 2/2) | Thomas Middleton | Whig |
| Evesham (seat 1/2) | Sir Edward Goodere | Tory |
| Evesham (seat 2/2) | John Rudge | Whig |
| Exeter (seat 1/2) | Sir Coplestone Bampfylde, Bt. | Tory |
| Exeter (seat 2/2) | John Snell | Tory |
| Eye (seat 1/2) | Sir Joseph Jekyll | Whig |
| Eye (seat 2/2) | Thomas Maynard | ? |
== F ==
| Fife (seat 1/1) | Sir Alexander Erskine | ? |
| Flint Boroughs (seat 1/1) | Sir John Conway | Tory |
| Flintshire (seat 1/1) | Sir Roger Mostyn | Tory |
| Forfarshire (seat 1/1) | John Carnegie | Tory |
| Fowey (seat 1/2) | Viscount Dupplin – ennobled Replaced by Bernard Granville 1712 | Tory ? |
| Fowey (seat 2/2) | Henry Vincent | Ind. |
== G ==
| Gatton (seat 1/2) | William Newland | Tory |
| Gatton (seat 2/2) | Paul Docminique | Tory |
| Glamorganshire (seat 1/1) | Sir Thomas Mansel – ennobled Replaced by Robert Jones 1712 | Tory Tory |
| Glasgow Burghs (seat 1/1) | Thomas Smith | ? |
| Gloucester (seat 1/2) | Thomas Webb | Tory |
| Gloucester (seat 2/2) | John Blanch | ? |
| Gloucestershire (seat 1/2) | John Symes Berkeley | Tory |
| Gloucestershire (seat 2/2) | Matthew Ducie Moreton | Whig |
| Grampound (seat 1/2) | Thomas Coke | Tory |
| Grampound (seat 2/2) | James Craggs | Whig |
| Grantham (seat 1/2) | Marquess of Granby | Whig |
| Grantham (seat 2/2) | Sir William Ellys | Whig |
| Great Bedwyn (seat 1/2) | Lord Bruce - sat for Marlborough; Replaced by Thomas Millington 1711 | Tory ? |
| Great Bedwyn (seat 2/2) | Sir Edward Seymour, Bt. 16 June 1711 | Tory |
| Great Grimsby (seat 1/2) | Robert Vyner | Tory |
| Great Grimsby (seat 2/2) | Arthur Moore | Tory |
| Great Marlow (seat 1/2) | Sir James Etheridge | Tory |
| Great Marlow (seat 2/2) | George Bruere and James Chase - double return George Bruere elected | ? Whig (not elected) |
| Great Yarmouth (seat 1/2) | Richard Ferrier | Tory |
| Great Yarmouth (seat 2/2) | George England | ? |
| Guildford (seat 1/2) | Denzil Onslow | Whig |
| Guildford (seat 2/2) | Robert Wroth; Replaced by Morgan Randyll 1711 | ? Tory |
== H ==
| Haddington Burghs (seat 1/1) | Hon. Sir David Dalrymple | Whig |
| Haddingtonshire (seat 1/1) | John Cockburn | Whig |
| Hampshire (seat 1/2) | George Pitt | Tory |
| Hampshire (seat 2/2) | Sir Simeon Stuart, Bt. | Tory |
| Harwich (seat 1/2) | Kenrick Edisbury | ? |
| Harwich (seat 2/2) | Thomas Frankland | Whig |
| Haslemere (seat 1/2) | Sir John Clerke, Bt | Tory |
| Haslemere (seat 2/2) | Theophilus Oglethorpe | Tory |
| Hastings (seat 1/2) | Hon. William Ashburnham | Tory |
| Hastings (seat 2/2) | Sir Joseph Martin | ? |
| Haverfordwest (seat 1/1) | John Laugharne | Tory |
| Hedon (seat 1/2) | William Pulteney | Whig |
| Hedon (seat 2/2) | Hugh Cholmley | Whig |
| Helston (seat 1/2) | George Granville - sat for Cornwall; Replaced by Robert Child 1710 | Tory ? |
| Helston (seat 2/2) | Sidney Godolphin | ? |
| Hereford (seat 1/2) | Hon. James Brydges | ? |
| Hereford (seat 2/2) | Thomas Foley | Tory |
| Herefordshire (seat 1/2) | The 3rd Viscount Scudamore | Tory |
| Herefordshire (seat 2/2) | John Prise – resigned Replaced by Sir Thomas Morgan | Tory Tory |
| Hertford (seat 1/2) | Charles Caesar | Tory |
| Hertford (seat 2/2) | Richard Goulston | ? |
| Hertfordshire (seat 1/2) | Ralph Freman | Tory |
| Hertfordshire (seat 2/2) | Thomas Halsey | Tory |
| Heytesbury (seat 1/2) | Edward Ashe | Whig |
| Heytesbury (seat 2/2) | William Ashe | Whig |
| Higham Ferrers (seat 1/1) | Hon. Thomas Watson-Wentworth | Whig |
| Hindon (seat 1/2) | Edmund Lambert | Tory |
| Hindon (seat 2/2) | Reynolds Calthorpe and George Morley – double return George Morley elected 1710– died Replaced by Henry Lee Warner 1711 | Whig (not elected) Tory Tory |
| Honiton (seat 1/2) | Sir William Drake | Tory |
| Honiton (seat 2/2) | Sir Walter Yonge and James Sheppard – double return Replaced by James Sheppard elected 1711 | Whig (not elected) Tory |
| Horsham (seat 1/2) | Charles Eversfield - sat for Sussex; Replaced by John Middleton 1710 | Tory ? |
| Horsham (seat 2/2) | John Wicker | Whig |
| Huntingdon (seat 1/2) | Edward Wortley Montagu | Whig |
| Huntingdon (seat 2/2) | Francis Page | Whig |
| Huntingdonshire (seat 1/2) | John Proby – died Replaced by Sir John Cotton 1710 | Ind. ? |
| Huntingdonshire (seat 2/2) | John Pocklington | Whig |
| Hythe (seat 1/2) | Hon. John Fane – unseated on petition Replaced by John Boteler 1711 | Whig Tory |
| Hythe (seat 2/2) | The Viscount Shannon– unseated on petition Replaced by William Berners 1711 - died Replaced by The Viscount Shannon 1712 | Whig ? Whig |
== I ==
| Ilchester (seat 1/2) | Samuel Masham – took office Replaced by Sir James Bateman 1712 | Tory ? |
| Ilchester (seat 2/2) | Edward Phelips | Tory |
| Inverness Burghs (seat 1/1) | George Mackenzie | ? |
| Inverness-shire (seat 1/1) | Alexander Mackenzie | ? |
| Ipswich (seat 1/2) | William Churchill | Whig |
| Ipswich (seat 2/2) | Sir William Barker | Tory |
== K ==
| Kent (seat 1/2) | Sir Cholmeley Dering, Bt – shot in duel Replaced by Sir William Hardres 1711 | Tory Tory |
| Kent (seat 2/2) | Percival Hart | ? |
| Kincardineshire (seat 1/1) | Sir Alexander Ramsay, Bt | ? |
| King's Lynn (seat 1/2) | Sir Charles Turner | Whig |
| King's Lynn (seat 2/2) | Robert Walpole – expelled and void election Replaced by John Turner 1712 | Whig ? |
| Kingston upon Hull (seat 1/2) | Sir William St Quintin | Whig |
| Kingston upon Hull (seat 2/2) | William Maister | Tory |
| Kinross-shire (seat 1/1) | Mungo Graham - unseated on petition Replaced by Sir John Malcolm, Bt 1711 | ? ? |
| Kirkcudbright Stewartry (seat 1/1) | John Stewart | Whig |
| Knaresborough (seat 1/2) | Christopher Stockdale | Whig |
| Knaresborough (seat 2/2) | Robert Byerley | Tory |
== L ==
| Lanarkshire (seat 1/1) | Sir James Hamilton of Rosehall | ? |
| Lancashire (seat 1/2) | Hon. Charles Zedenno Stanley | Whig |
| Lancashire (seat 2/2) | Richard Shuttleworth | Tory |
| Lancaster (seat 1/2) | Robert Heysham | Tory |
| Lancaster (seat 2/2) | William Heysham | Tory |
| Launceston (seat 1/2) | Lord Hyde – succeeded to peerage Replaced by George Clarke 1711 | Tory Tory |
| Launceston (seat 2/2) | Francis Scobell | Tory |
| Leicester (seat 1/2) | Sir George Beaumont | Tory |
| Leicester (seat 2/2) | James Winstanley | Tory |
| Leicestershire (seat 1/2) | Marquess of Granby – succeeded to peerage Replaced by Sir Thomas Cave 1711 | Whig Tory |
| Leicestershire (seat 2/2) | Geoffrey Palmer | Tory |
| Leominster (seat 1/2) | Edward Harley | Tory |
| Leominster (seat 2/2) | Edward Bangham | ? |
| Lewes (seat 1/2) | Peter Gott – died Replaced by John Morley Trevor 1712 | Whig ? |
| Lewes (seat 2/2) | Thomas Pelham | Whig |
| Lichfield (seat 1/2) | Richard Dyott | ? |
| Lichfield (seat 2/2) | John Cotes | Tory |
| Lincoln (seat 1/2) | Richard Grantham | ? |
| Lincoln (seat 2/2) | Thomas Lister | Tory |
| Lincolnshire (seat 1/2) | Lewis Dymoke | ? |
| Lincolnshire (seat 2/2) | Lord Willoughby d'Eresby | Tory |
| Linlithgow Burghs (seat 1/1) | Hon. George Douglas | Whig |
| Linlithgowshire (seat 1/1) | John Houston | Tory |
| Liskeard (seat 1/2) | William Bridges | ? |
| Liskeard (seat 2/2) | Philip Rashleigh | Tory |
| Liverpool (seat 1/2) | Sir Thomas Johnson | Whig |
| Liverpool (seat 2/2) | John Cleiveland | ? |
| London (City of) (seat 1/4) | Sir William Withers | Tory |
| London (City of) (seat 2/4) | Sir Richard Hoare | Tory |
| London (City of) (seat 3/4) | Sir George Newland | Tory |
| London (City of) (seat 4/4) | Sir John Cass | Tory |
| Lostwithiel (seat 1/2) | John Hill | Tory |
| Lostwithiel (seat 2/2) | Hugh Fortescue | Whig |
| Ludgershall (seat 1/2) | John Richmond Webb | Tory |
| Ludgershall (seat 2/2) | Thomas Pearce | ? |
| Ludlow (seat 1/2) | Sir Thomas Powys | Tory |
| Ludlow (seat 2/2) | Acton Baldwyn | Tory |
| Lyme Regis (seat 1/2) | Henry Henley | ? |
| Lyme Regis (seat 2/2) | John Burridge | Whig |
| Lymington (seat 1/2) | Paul Burrard | Whig |
| Lymington (seat 2/2) | Lord William Powlett | ? |
== M ==
| Maidstone (seat 1/2) | Sir Thomas Culpeper | Whig |
| Maidstone (seat 2/2) | Sir Robert Marsham | Whig |
| Maldon (seat 1/2) | John Comyns | ? |
| Maldon (seat 2/2) | Thomas Richmond – died Replaced by William Fytche 1711 – resigned Replaced by Thomas Bramston 1712 | Whig ? Tory |
| Malmesbury (seat 1/2) | Thomas Farrington – died Replaced by Sir John Rushout 1713 | Whig Whig |
| Malmesbury (seat 2/2) | Joseph Addison | Whig |
| Malton (seat 1/2) | William Palmes | Whig |
| Malton (seat 2/2) | William Strickland | Whig |
| Marlborough (seat 1/2) | Lord Bruce – ennobled Replaced by Richard Jones 1712 | Tory ? |
| Marlborough (seat 2/2) | Hon. Robert Bruce | Tory |
| Merionethshire (seat 1/1) | Richard Vaughan | Tory |
| Middlesex (seat 1/2) | Hon. James Bertie | Tory |
| Middlesex (seat 2/2) | Hugh Smithson | Tory |
| Midhurst (seat 1/2) | Lawrence Alcock | Tory |
| Midhurst (seat 2/2) | Robert Orme – died Replaced by John Pratt 1711 | Tory ? |
| Milborne Port (seat 1/2) | Sir Thomas Travell | Whig |
| Milborne Port (seat 2/2) | James Medlycott | ? |
| Minehead (seat 1/2) | Sir John Trevelyan | Tory |
| Minehead (seat 2/2) | Sir Jacob Bancks | Tory |
| Mitchell (seat 1/2) | Abraham Blackmore | ? |
| Mitchell (seat 2/2) | Richard Belasyse | ? |
| Monmouth Boroughs (seat 1/1) | Clayton Milborne | Tory |
| Monmouthshire (seat 1/2) | John Morgan | Whig |
| Monmouthshire (seat 2/2) | The 1st Viscount Windsor – ennobled Replaced by James Gunter 1712 – died Replaced by Thomas Lewis 1713 | Tory ? ? |
| Montgomery (seat 1/1) | John Pugh | Tory |
| Montgomeryshire (seat 1/1) | Edward Vaughan | Tory |
| Morpeth (seat 1/2) | Sir Richard Sandford | Whig |
| Morpeth (seat 2/2) | Christopher Wandesford | ? |
== N ==
| Nairnshire (seat 0/0) | Alternated with Cromartyshire-unrepresented in this Parliament | |
| New Radnor Boroughs (seat 1/1) | Robert Harley – ennobled Replaced by Lord Harley 1711 | Tory Tory |
| New Romney (seat 1/2) | Walter Whitfield – died Replaced by Edward Watson 1713 | ? Whig |
| New Romney (seat 2/2) | Robert Furnese | Whig |
| New Shoreham (seat 1/2) | Sir Gregory Page | Whig |
| New Shoreham (seat 2/2) | Nathaniel Gould | ? |
| New Windsor (seat 1/2) | Richard Topham | Whig |
| New Windsor (seat 2/2) | William Paul – died Replaced by Samuel Masham 1711 – ennobled Replaced by Charles Aldworth 1712 | ? Tory ? |
| New Woodstock (seat 1/2) | Sir Thomas Wheate | Whig |
| New Woodstock (seat 2/2) | William Cadogan | Whig |
| Newark (seat 1/2) | Sir Thomas Willoughby, Bt – ennobled Replaced by Richard Sutton 1712 | Tory Whig |
| Newark (seat 2/2) | Richard Newdigate | ? |
| Newcastle-under-Lyme (seat 1/2) | Rowland Cotton | Tory |
| Newcastle-under-Lyme (seat 2/2) | William Burslem | ? |
| Newcastle-upon-Tyne (seat 1/2) | Sir William Blackett, Bt. | Tory |
| Newcastle-upon-Tyne (seat 2/2) | William Wrightson | Tory |
| Newport (Cornwall) (seat 1/2) | Sir Nicholas Morice | Tory |
| Newport (Cornwall) (seat 2/2) | George Courtenay | Tory |
| Newport (Isle of Wight) (seat 1/2) | John Richmond Webb - sat for Ludgershall; Replaced by William Seymour 1710 | Tory Tory |
| Newport (Isle of Wight) (seat 2/2) | William Stephens | Tory |
| Newton (Lancashire) (seat 1/2) | Thomas Legh | Tory |
| Newton (Lancashire) (seat 2/2) | John Ward | Tory |
| Newtown (Isle of Wight) (seat 1/2) | Sir James Worsley | Tory |
| Newtown (Isle of Wight) (seat 2/2) | Henry Worsley | Tory |
| Norfolk (seat 1/2) | Sir John Wodehouse | Tory |
| Norfolk (seat 2/2) | Sir Jacob Astley, Bt. | Tory |
| Northallerton (seat 1/2) | Roger Gale | Whig |
| Northallerton (seat 2/2) | Robert Raikes | ? |
| Northampton (seat 1/2) | William Wykes | ? |
| Northampton (seat 2/2) | George Montagu | Whig |
| Northamptonshire (seat 1/2) | Sir Justinian Isham | Tory |
| Northamptonshire (seat 2/2) | Thomas Cartwright | Tory |
| Northumberland (seat 1/2) | Earl of Hertford | Whig |
| Northumberland (seat 2/2) | Thomas Forster | Tory |
| Norwich (seat 1/2) | Robert Bene | ? |
| Norwich (seat 2/2) | Richard Berney | ? |
| Nottingham (seat 1/2) | John Plumptre | Whig |
| Nottingham (seat 2/2) | Robert Sacheverell | ? |
| Nottinghamshire (seat 1/2) | The 1st Viscount Howe | ? |
| Nottinghamshire (seat 2/2) | William Levinz | Tory |
== O ==
| Okehampton (seat 1/2) | John Dibble | Whig |
| Okehampton (seat 2/2) | Christopher Harris | Tory |
| Old Sarum (seat 1/2) | Thomas Pitt | ? |
| Old Sarum (seat 2/2) | William Harvey | Tory |
| Orford (seat 1/2) | Clement Corrance | Tory |
| Orford (seat 2/2) | Sir Edward Turnour | Tory |
| Orkney and Shetland (seat 1/1) | Sir Alexander Douglas | Tory |
| Oxford (seat 1/2) | Sir John Walter | Tory |
| Oxford (seat 2/2) | Thomas Rowney | Tory |
| Oxfordshire (seat 1/2) | Sir Robert Jenkinson | Tory |
| Oxfordshire (seat 2/2) | Francis Clerke | ? |
| Oxford University (seat 1/2) | Sir William Whitelock | Tory |
| Oxford University (seat 2/2) | Wiliam Bromley | Tory |
== P ==
| Peeblesshire (seat 1/1) | Alexander Murray | ? |
| Pembroke Boroughs (seat 1/1) | Sir Arthur Owen – unseated on petition Replaced by Replaced by Lewis Wogan 1712 | Whig; Tory |
| Pembrokeshire (seat 1/1) | John Barlow | Tory |
| Penryn (seat 1/2) | Samuel Trefusis | Tory |
| Penryn (seat 2/2) | Alexander Pendarves | Tory |
| Perth Burghs (seat 1/1) | George Yeaman | ? |
| Perthshire (seat 1/1) | Lord James Murray | ? |
| Peterborough (seat 1/2) | Viscount Milton | Whig |
| Peterborough (seat 2/2) | Charles Parker | Tory |
| Petersfield (seat 1/2) | Leonard Bilson | Tory |
| Petersfield (seat 2/2) | Norton Powlett | Whig |
| Plymouth (seat 1/2) | Charles Trelawny | Tory |
| Plymouth (seat 2/2) | Sir George Byng | Whig |
| Plympton Erle (seat 1/2) | Richard Edgcumbe | Whig |
| Plympton Erle (seat 2/2) | George Treby | Whig |
| Pontefract (seat 1/2) | Sir John Bland | Tory |
| Pontefract (seat 2/2) | Robert Frank | ? |
| Poole (seat 1/2) | Thomas Ridge – expelled Replaced by William Lewen 1711 | Whig Tory |
| Poole (seat 2/2) | Sir William Phippard | ? |
| Portsmouth (seat 1/2) | Sir Charles Wager – unseated on petition Replaced by Sir James Wishart 1711 | Whig Tory |
| Portsmouth (seat 2/2) | Sir John Jennings – unseated on petition Replaced by Sir William Gifford 1711 | Whig ? |
| Preston (seat 1/2) | Henry Fleetwood | Tory |
| Preston (seat 2/2) | Sir Henry Hoghton, Bt | Whig |
== Q ==
| Queenborough (seat 1/2) | Colonel Thomas King | Whig |
| Queenborough (seat 2/2) | James Herbert III | ? |
== R ==
| Radnorshire (seat 1/1) | Thomas Harley | Tory |
| Reading (seat 1/2) | Owen Buckingham | Whig |
| Reading (seat 2/2) | John Dalby | ? |
| Reigate (seat 1/2) | Sir John Parsons | Tory |
| Reigate (seat 2/2) | John Ward | ? |
| Renfrewshire (seat 1/1) | Sir Robert Pollock, Bt | ? |
| Richmond (Yorkshire) (seat 1/2) | John Yorke | Whig |
| Richmond (Yorkshire) (seat 2/2) | Hon. Harry Mordaunt | Whig |
| Ripon (seat 1/2) | John Aislabie | Whig |
| Ripon (seat 2/2) | John Sharp | Tory |
| Rochester (seat 1/2) | Admiral Sir John Leake | ? |
| Rochester (seat 2/2) | William Cage | Tory |
| Ross-shire (seat 1/1) | Charles Ross | Independent Whig |
| Roxburghshire (seat 1/1) | Sir Gilbert Eliott | Whig |
| Rutland (seat 1/2) | John Noel – unseated on petition Replaced by Richard Halford 1711 | Whig Tory |
| Rutland (seat 2/2) | Lord Finch | Tory |
| Rye (seat 1/2) | Phillips Gybbon | Whig |
| Rye (seat 2/2) | Sir John Norris | Whig |
== S ==
| St Albans (seat 1/2) | William Grimston | ? |
| St Albans (seat 2/2) | John Gape | Tory |
| St Germans (seat 1/2) | Edward Eliot | Tory |
| St Germans (seat 2/2) | John Knight | Whig |
| St Ives (seat 1/2) | John Hopkins | Whig |
| St Ives (seat 2/2) | John Praed | Tory |
| St Mawes (seat 1/2) | Sir Richard Onslow | Whig |
| St Mawes (seat 2/2) | John Tredenham – died Replaced by John Anstis 20 January 1711 | Tory Tory |
| Salisbury (seat 1/2) | Charles Fox | Tory |
| Salisbury (seat 2/2) | Robert Pitt | Tory |
| Saltash (seat 1/2) | Sir Cholmeley Dering, Bt - sat for Kent; Replaced by Jonathan Elford 1710 | Tory ? |
| Saltash (seat 2/2) | Alexander Pendarves - sat for Penryn; Replaced by Sir William Carew 1711 | Tory ? |
| Sandwich (seat 1/2) | Sir Henry Furnese – died Replaced by John Michel 1713 | Whig ? |
| Sandwich (seat 2/2) | Josiah Burchett | Whig |
| Scarborough (seat 1/2) | William Thompson | Whig |
| Scarborough (seat 2/2) | John Hungerford | Tory |
| Seaford (seat 1/2) | William Lowndes | Whig |
| Seaford (seat 2/2) | Thomas Chowne | ? |
| Selkirkshire (seat 1/1) | John Pringle | ? |
| Shaftesbury (seat 1/2) | Edward Seymour - died Replaced by Henry Whitaker 1711 | ? ? |
| Shaftesbury (seat 2/2) | Edward Nicholas | Tory |
| Shrewsbury (seat 1/2) | Richard Mytton | Tory |
| Shrewsbury (seat 2/2) | Edward Cressett | ? |
| Shropshire (seat 1/2) | John Kynaston | ? |
| Shropshire (seat 2/2) | Robert Lloyd | ? |
| Somerset (seat 1/2) | Sir Thomas Wroth, Bt | Tory |
| Somerset (seat 2/2) | Sir William Wyndham, Bt | Tory |
| Southampton (seat 1/2) | Adam de Cardonnel – expelled Replaced by Roger Harris 1712 | Whig ? |
| Southampton (seat 2/2) | Richard Fleming | ? |
| Southwark (seat 1/2) | Charles Cox | Whig |
| Southwark (seat 2/2) | John Cholmley – died Replaced by Edmund Halsey 1712 – unseated on petition Replaced by Sir George Matthews 1712 | Whig Whig ? |
| Stafford (seat 1/2) | Walter Chetwynd – unseated on petition Replaced by Henry Vernon 1711 | Whig ? |
| Stafford (seat 2/2) | Thomas Foley – ennobled Replaced by Walter Chetwynd 1712 | Tory Whig |
| Staffordshire (seat 1/2) | Hon. Henry Paget – ennobled Replaced by Charles Bagot 1712 | Tory ? |
| Staffordshire (seat 2/2) | William Ward | ? |
| Stamford (seat 1/2) | Hon. Charles Cecil | Tory |
| Stamford (seat 2/2) | Hon. Charles Bertie | Tory |
| Steyning (seat 1/2) | Sir Henry Goring, Bt | ? |
| Steyning (seat 2/2) | William Wallis – election void Replaced by The Lord Bellew of Duleek 1711 – election void Replaced by Robert Leeves 1713 | ? ? ? |
| Stirling Burghs (seat 1/1) | Henry Cunningham | Whig |
| Stirlingshire (seat 1/1) | Sir Hugh Paterson, Bt | ? |
| Stockbridge (seat 1/2) | The 4th Earl of Barrymore | Tory |
| Stockbridge (seat 2/2) | George Dashwood | ? |
| Sudbury (seat 1/2) | John Mead | ? |
| Sudbury (seat 2/2) | Robert Echlin | ? |
| Suffolk (seat 1/2) | Sir Thomas Hanmer, Bt | Tory |
| Suffolk (seat 2/2) | Sir Robert Davers, Bt | Tory |
| Surrey (seat 1/2) | Sir Francis Vincent, Bt | ? |
| Surrey (seat 2/2) | Hon. Heneage Finch | ? |
| Sussex (seat 1/2) | Sir George Parker, Bt | ? |
| Sussex (seat 2/2) | Charles Eversfield | Tory |
| Sutherland (seat 1/1) | Sir William Gordon | ? |
== T ==
| Tain Burghs (seat 1/1) | Sir Robert Munro, Bt | Whig |
| Tamworth (seat 1/2) | Joseph Girdler | Tory |
| Tamworth (seat 2/2) | Samuel Bracebridge | ? |
| Taunton (seat 1/2) | Sir Francis Warre | Tory |
| Taunton (seat 2/2) | Henry Seymour Portman | Tory |
| Tavistock (seat 1/2) | Sir John Cope | Whig |
| Tavistock (seat 2/2) | Henry Manaton – unseated on petition Replaced by James Bulteel 1711 | Tory ? |
| Tewkesbury (seat 1/2) | William Bromley | ? |
| Tewkesbury (seat 2/2) | Henry Ireton – died Replaced by William Dowdeswell 1712 | Whig Whig |
| Thetford (seat 1/2) | Sir Thomas Hanmer - sat for Suffolk; Replaced by Sir Edmund Bacon 1710 | Tory ? |
| Thetford (seat 2/2) | Dudley North | Tory |
| Thirsk (seat 1/2) | Sir Thomas Frankland – resigned Replaced by Thomas Worsley 1711 | Whig ? |
| Thirsk (seat 2/2) | Ralph Bell | ? |
| Tiverton (seat 1/2) | John Worth – election void – re-elected | ? |
| Tiverton (seat 2/2) | Thomas Bere and Richard Mervin - Double return. election void Replaced by Sir Edward Northey 1710 | Whig (not elected) Tory (not elected) Tory |
| Totnes (seat 1/2) | Francis Gwyn | Tory |
| Totnes (seat 2/2) | Thomas Coulson | ? |
| Tregony (seat 1/2) | Viscount Rialton – succeeded to peerage Replaced by Edward Southwell 1713 | Whig ? |
| Tregony (seat 2/2) | John Trevanion sit for Cornwall; Replaced by George Robinson 1710 | Tory ? |
| Truro (seat 1/2) | Hugh Boscawen | Whig |
| Truro (seat 2/2) | Henry Vincent | Whig |
== W ==
| Wallingford (seat 1/2) | Simon Harcourt | ? |
| Wallingford (seat 2/2) | Thomas Renda | ? |
| Wareham (seat 1/2) | Thomas Erle | Whig |
| Wareham (seat 2/2) | George Pitt - sat for Hampshire; Replaced by Sir Edward Ernle 1710 | Tory Whig |
| Warwick (seat 1/2) | Hon. Francis Greville – died Replaced by Charles Leigh 1710 | Tory Tory |
| Warwick (seat 2/2) | Hon. Dodington Greville | ? |
| Warwickshire (seat 1/2) | Lord Compton – ennobled Replaced by Sir William Boughton 1712 | Tory ? |
| Warwickshire (seat 2/2) | Sir John Mordaunt | Tory |
| Wells (seat 1/2) | Maurice Berkeley | ? |
| Wells (seat 2/2) | Edward Colston | Tory |
| Wendover (seat 1/2) | Sir Roger Hill | Whig |
| Wendover (seat 2/2) | Henry Grey | Whig |
| Wenlock (seat 1/2) | George Weld | ? |
| Wenlock (seat 2/2) | Sir William Forester | Whig |
| Weobley (seat 1/2) | John Birch | Whig |
| Weobley (seat 2/2) | Henry Cornewall | ? |
| West Looe (seat 1/2) | Sir Charles Hedges | Tory |
| West Looe (seat 2/2) | Arthur Maynwaring – died Replaced by John Trelawny 1713 | Whig ? |
| Westbury (seat 1/2) | Hon. Henry Bertie | Tory |
| Westbury (seat 2/2) | Francis Annesley | ? |
| Westminster (seat 1/2) | Thomas Medlycott | Tory |
| Westminster (seat 2/2) | Sir Thomas Crosse, Bt | Tory |
| Westmorland (seat 1/2) | Daniel Wilson | Whig |
| Westmorland (seat 2/2) | James Grahme | ? |
| Weymouth and Melcombe Regis (seat 1/4) | Hon. Maurice Ashley | Whig |
| Weymouth and Melcombe Regis (seat 2/4) | James Littleton– election void - unseated on petition Replaced by Thomas Hardy 1711 | ? ? |
| Weymouth and Melcombe Regis (seat 3/4) | William Betts – election void - unseated on petition Replaced by William Harvey 1711 | Whig Tory |
| Weymouth and Melcombe Regis (seat 4/4) | Anthony Henley – died Replaced by Reginald Marriott 1711 | Whig ? |
| Whitchurch (seat 1/2) | Thomas Vernon | ? |
| Whitchurch (seat 2/2) | Frederick Tylney | ? |
| Wigan (seat 1/2) | Sir Roger Bradshaigh | Tory |
| Wigan (seat 2/2) | Henry Bradshaigh – died George Kenyon 22 April 1713 | ? ? |
| Wigtown Burghs (seat 1/1) | William Cochrane | Tory |
| Wigtownshire (seat 1/1) | Patrick Vanse – unseated on petition Replaced by John Stewart 1711 | ? ? |
| Wilton (seat 1/2) | John London - unseated on petition Replaced by Peter Bathurst 1711 | ? Tory |
| Wilton (seat 2/2) | Charles Mompesson | ? |
| Wiltshire (seat 1/2) | Sir Richard Howe | Tory |
| Wiltshire (seat 2/2) | Robert Hyde | ? |
| Winchelsea (seat 1/2) | Sir Francis Dashwood | Whig |
| Winchelsea (seat 2/2) | Robert Bristow II | ? |
| Winchester (seat 1/2) | George Rodney Brydges | Whig |
| Winchester (seat 2/2) | Thomas Lewis | Tory |
| Wootton Bassett (seat 1/2) | Henry St John – sat for Berkshire; Replaced by Edmund Pleydell 1710 | Tory ? |
| Wootton Bassett (seat 2/2) | Richard Goddard | ? |
| Worcester (seat 1/2) | Thomas Wylde | ? |
| Worcester (seat 2/2) | Samuel Swift | Tory |
| Worcestershire (seat 1/2) | Sir John Pakington | Tory |
| Worcestershire (seat 2/2) | Samuel Pytts | ? |
== Y ==
| Yarmouth (Isle of Wight) (seat 1/2) | Henry Holmes | Tory |
| Yarmouth (Isle of Wight) (seat 2/2) | Sir Gilbert Dolben, Bt | Tory |
| York (seat 1/2) | Sir William Robinson | Whig |
| York (seat 2/2) | Robert Benson | Tory |
| Yorkshire (seat 1/2) | The 2nd Viscount Downe | Tory |
| Yorkshire (seat 2/2) | Sir Arthur Kaye, Bt | Tory |

== By-elections ==
- List of Great Britain by-elections (1707–15)

== See also ==
- 1710 British general election
- List of parliaments of Great Britain
- Unreformed House of Commons
