= List of MPs elected in the 1708 British general election =

1708–1710 Parliament of Great Britain
←	1705–1708 Parliament	1710–1713 Parliament	→

Overview
- Legislative body: Parliament of Great Britain
- Meeting place: Palace of Westminster
- Term: 8 July 1708 – 21 September 1710
- Election: 1708 British general election
- Government: Godolphin–Marlborough ministry

House of Commons
- Members: 558
- Speaker: Richard Onslow
- Chief ministers: Sidney Godolphin, 1st Earl of Godolphin; John Churchill, 1st Duke of Marlborough

House of Lords
- Lord Chancellor: William Cowper, 1st Earl Cowper

Crown-in-Parliament Anne

Sessions
- 1st: 16 November 1708 – 21 April 1709
- 2nd: 15 November 1709 – 5 April 1710

This is a list of the 558 MPs or members of Parliament elected to the 314 constituencies of the Parliament of Great Britain in 1708, the 2nd Parliament of Great Britain, and their replacements returned at subsequent by-elections, arranged by constituency.

The reference, in the constituency section of the table, to the numbers of seats in a constituency has no relevance except to make clear how many members were elected in a particular constituency. The candidates returned in contested elections are listed in the descending order of the number of votes received. Where vote totals are unknown, the MPs received the same number of votes or were returned unopposed the order is that given by Hayton et al.

Peers of Ireland are differentiated from the holders of courtesy titles by including the succession number to the peerage, i.e. The 1st Earl of Upper Ossory is an Irish peer and Viscount Dupplin is the holder of a courtesy title.

Elections took place in May, 1708.

Table of contents:

A B C D E F G H I J K L M N O P Q R S T U V W X Y Z By-elections Changes

== A ==
Aberdeen Burghs (seat 1/1)	John Gordon	Whig
Aberdeenshire (seat 1/1)	Lord Haddo - ineligible as son of Scottish peer Replaced by Sir Alexander Cumming 1709	Tory; Tory
Abingdon (seat 1/1)	Sir Simon Harcourt - unseated on petition Replaced by William Hucks 1709	Tory; Whig
Aldborough (seat 1/2)	Robert Monckton	Whig
Aldborough (seat 2/2)	William Jessop	Whig
Aldeburgh (seat 1/2)	Henry Johnson	Tory
Aldeburgh (seat 2/2)	William Johnson	Tory
Amersham (seat 1/2)	Francis Duncombe	Tory
Amersham (seat 2/2)	Sir Samuel Garrard, Bt	Tory
Andover (seat 1/2)	John Smith	Whig
Andover (seat 2/2)	William Guidott	Whig
Anglesey (seat 1/1)	The 4th Viscount Bulkeley	Tory
Anstruther Easter Burghs (seat 1/1)	Sir John Anstruther, Bt	Whig
Appleby (seat 1/2)	Edward Duncombe	Tory
Appleby (seat 2/2)	Nicholas Lechmere	Whig
Argyllshire (seat 1/1)	James Campbell	Whig
Arundel (seat 1/2)	Sir Henry Peachey, Bt - sat for Sussex; Replaced by Viscount Lumley 1708	Whig; Whig
Arundel (seat 2/2)	The 2nd Viscount Shannon	Whig
Ashburton (seat 1/2)	Roger Tuckfield	Whig
Ashburton (seat 2/2)	Robert Balle	Whig
Aylesbury (seat 1/2)	Sir John Wittewronge, Bt	Whig
Aylesbury (seat 2/2)	Simon Mayne	Whig
Ayr Burghs (seat 1/1)	James Campbell	Whig
Ayrshire (seat 1/1)	Francis Montgomerie	Whig
== B ==
Banbury (seat 1/1)	Hon. Charles North	Tory
Banffshire (seat 1/1)	Alexander Abercromby	Whig
Barnstaple (seat 1/2)	Richard Acland	Tory
Barnstaple (seat 2/2)	Nicholas Hooper	Tory
Bath (seat 1/2)	William Blathwayt	Whig
Bath (seat 2/2)	Samuel Trotman	Tory
Beaumaris (seat 1/1)	Hon. Henry Bertie	Tory
Bedford (seat 1/2)	William Farrer	Whig
Bedford (seat 2/2)	William Hillersden	Whig
Bedfordshire (seat 1/2)	Lord Edward Russell	Whig
Bedfordshire (seat 2/2)	Sir William Gostwick, Bt	Whig
Bere Alston (seat 1/2)	Spencer Cowper	Whig
Bere Alston (seat 2/2)	Peter King	Whig
Berkshire (seat 1/2)	Sir John Stonhouse, Bt	Tory
Berkshire (seat 2/2)	Richard Neville	Whig
Berwickshire (seat 1/1)	George Baillie	Whig
Berwick-upon-Tweed (seat 1/2)	Samuel Ogle	Whig
Berwick-upon-Tweed (seat 2/2)	Jonathan Hutchinson	Whig
Beverley (seat 1/2)	Sir Charles Hotham, Bt	Whig
Beverley (seat 2/2)	Sir Michael Warton	Tory
Bewdley (seat 1/1)	Hon. Henry Herbert - succeeded to peerage Replaced by Charles Cornwall 1709	Whig; Whig
Bishop's Castle (seat 1/2)	Richard Harnage	Whig
Bishop's Castle (seat 2/2)	Charles Mason	Whig
Bletchingley (seat 1/2)	Thomas Onslow	Whig
Bletchingley (seat 2/2)	George Evelyn	Whig
Bodmin (seat 1/2)	Russell Robartes	Whig
Bodmin (seat 2/2)	John Trevanion	Tory
Boroughbridge (seat 1/2)	Sir Brian Stapylton, Bt	Tory
Boroughbridge (seat 2/2)	Craven Peyton	Whig
Bossiney (seat 1/2)	Samuel Travers	Whig
Bossiney (seat 2/2)	Francis Foote	Whig
Boston (seat 1/2)	Hon. Peregrine Bertie	Tory
Boston (seat 2/2)	Richard Wynn	Tory
Brackley (seat 1/2)	Hon. Charles Egerton	Whig
Brackley (seat 2/2)	Hon. William Egerton	Whig
Bramber (seat 1/2)	The 1st Viscount Windsor - unseated on petition Replaced by William Hale Jan 1709.	Tory; Whig
Bramber (seat 2/2)	William Shippen - unseated on petition Replaced by Sir Cleave More, Bt Jan 1709.	Tory; Whig
Brecon (seat 1/1)	Sir Jeffrey Jeffreys - died Replaced by Edward Jeffreys 1709	Tory; Tory
Breconshire (seat 1/1)	Sir Edward Williams	Tory
Bridgnorth (seat 1/2)	William Whitmore	Whig
Bridgnorth (seat 2/2)	Sir Humphrey Brigges, Bt	Whig
Bridgwater (seat 1/2)	George Dodington	Whig
Bridgwater (seat 2/2)	George Balch	Whig
Bridport (seat 1/2)	Thomas Strangways	Tory
Bridport (seat 2/2)	William Coventry	Whig
Bristol (seat 1/2)	Robert Yate	Whig
Bristol (seat 2/2)	Sir William Daines	Whig
Buckingham (seat 1/2)	Sir Richard Temple, Bt	Whig
Buckingham (seat 2/2)	Alexander Denton	Whig
Buckinghamshire (seat 1/2)	Sir Edmund Denton, Bt	Whig
Buckinghamshire (seat 2/2)	Richard Hampden	Whig
Bury St Edmunds (seat 1/2)	Sir Thomas Felton, Bt - died Replaced by Joseph Weld 1709	Whig; Tory
Bury St Edmunds (seat 2/2)	Aubrey Porter	Ind.
Buteshire (seat 1/1)	Dugald Stewart - resigned Replaced by John Montgomerie 1710	Tory; Whig
== C ==
Caernarvon Boroughs (seat 1/1)	William Griffith	Tory
Caernarvonshire (seat 1/1)	Sir John Wynn, Bt	Tory
Caithness (seat 0/0)	unrepresented in this Parliament	
Callington (seat 1/2)	Sir William Coryton, Bt	Tory
Callington (seat 2/2)	Samuel Rolle	Tory
Calne (seat 1/2)	Edward Bayntun	Whig
Calne (seat 2/2)	George Duckett	Whig
Cambridge (seat 1/2)	John Hynde Cotton	Tory
Cambridge (seat 2/2)	Samuel Shepheard - Election void, but re-elected 1710	Tory
Cambridgeshire (seat 1/2)	Sir Rushout Cullen, Bt	Whig
Cambridgeshire (seat 2/2)	John Bromley	Tory
Cambridge University (seat 1/2)	Hon. Arthur Annesley	Tory
Cambridge University (seat 2/2)	Hon. Dixie Windsor	Tory
Camelford (seat 1/2)	Richard Munden	Whig
Camelford (seat 2/2)	John Manley	Tory
Canterbury (seat 1/2)	Hon. Edward Watson	Whig
Canterbury (seat 2/2)	Thomas D'Aeth	Whig
Cardiff Boroughs (seat 1/1)	Sir John Aubrey, Bt	Whig
Cardigan Boroughs (seat 1/1)	Lewis Pryse -sat for Cardiganshire; Replaced by Simon Harcourt 1710	Tory; Tory
Cardiganshire (seat 1/1)	Lewis Pryse	Tory
Carlisle (seat 1/2)	Sir James Montagu	Whig
Carlisle (seat 2/2)	Thomas Stanwix	Whig
Carmarthen (seat 1/1)	Richard Vaughan	Whig
Carmarthenshire (seat 1/1)	Griffith Rice	Whig
Castle Rising (seat 1/2)	Hon. William Feilding	Whig
Castle Rising (seat 2/2)	Horatio Walpole	Tory
Cheshire (seat 1/2)	Hon. Langham Booth	Whig
Cheshire (seat 2/2)	John Offley-Crewe	Whig
Chester (seat 1/2)	Sir Henry Bunbury, Bt	Tory
Chester (seat 2/2)	Peter Shakerley	Tory
Chichester (seat 1/2)	Sir Richard Farington, Bt	Whig
Chichester (seat 2/2)	Thomas Carr	Tory
Chippenham (seat 1/2)	Sir James Long, Bt	Tory
Chippenham (seat 2/2)	James Montagu	Whig
Chipping Wycombe (seat 1/2)	Charles Godfrey	Whig
Chipping Wycombe (seat 2/2)	Fleetwood Dormer	Whig
Christchurch (seat 1/2)	Francis Gwyn	Tory
Christchurch (seat 2/2)	William Ettrick	Tory
Cirencester (seat 1/2)	Allen Bathurst - Election void, but re-elected 1709	Tory
Cirencester (seat 2/2)	Charles Coxe - Election void, but re-elected 1709	Tory
Clackmannanshire (seat 1/1)	William Dalrymple	Whig
Clitheroe (seat 1/2)	Edward Harvey	Tory
Clitheroe (seat 2/2)	Christopher Parker	Tory
Cockermouth (seat 1/2)	James Stanhope	Whig
Cockermouth (seat 2/2)	Hon. Albemarle Bertie	Whig
Colchester (seat 1/2)	Sir Isaac Rebow	Whig
Colchester (seat 2/2)	Sir Thomas Webster, Bt	Whig
Corfe Castle (seat 1/2)	John Bankes	Tory
Corfe Castle (seat 2/2)	Richard Fownes	Tory
Cornwall (seat 1/2)	James Buller	Tory
Cornwall (seat 2/2)	Hugh Boscawen	Whig
Coventry (seat 1/2)	Sir Orlando Bridgeman, Bt	Whig
Coventry (seat 2/2)	Edward Hopkins	Whig
Cricklade (seat 1/2)	Edmund Dunch	Whig
Cricklade (seat 2/2)	James Vernon	Whig
Cromartyshire (seat 0/0)	unrepresented in this Parliament	
Cumberland (seat 1/2)	James Lowther	Whig
Cumberland (seat 2/2)	Gilfrid Lawson	Tory
== D ==
Dartmouth (seat 1/2)	Nathaniel Herne	Tory
Dartmouth (seat 2/2)	Frederick Herne	Tory
Denbigh Boroughs (seat 1/1)	Sir William Williams, Bt	Tory
Denbighshire (seat 1/1)	Sir Richard Myddelton, Bt	Tory
Derby (seat 1/2)	Lord James Cavendish	Whig
Derby (seat 2/2)	Sir Thomas Parker - resigned Replaced by Richard Pye 1710	Whig; Whig
Derbyshire (seat 1/2)	Thomas Coke	Tory
Derbyshire (seat 2/2)	John Curzon	Tory
Devizes (seat 1/2)	Josiah Diston	Whig
Devizes (seat 2/2)	Paul Methuen	Whig
Devon (seat 1/2)	Sir William Courtenay, Bt	Tory
Devon (seat 2/2)	Robert Rolle	Tory
Dorchester (seat 1/2)	John Churchill - died Replaced by Denis Bond 1710	Whig; Whig
Dorchester (seat 2/2)	Awnsham Churchill	Whig
Dorset (seat 1/2)	Thomas Strangways	Tory
Dorset (seat 2/2)	Thomas Chafin	Tory
Dover (seat 1/2)	Matthew Aylmer	Whig
Dover (seat 2/2)	Philip Papillon	Whig
Downton (seat 1/2)	Sir Charles Duncombe	Tory
Downton (seat 2/2)	John Eyre	Whig
Droitwich (seat 1/2)	Edward Foley	Tory
Droitwich (seat 2/2)	Edward Winnington	Tory
Dumfries Burghs (seat 1/1)	William Johnstone	?
Dumfriesshire (seat 1/1)	Lord Johnstone - ineligible as eldest son of a Scottish peer Replaced by Sir William Grierson, Bt 1709	? Tory
Dunbartonshire (seat 1/1)	John Campbell	Whig
Dunwich (seat 1/2)	Sir Charles Blois, Bt - unseated on petition Replaced by Sir Richard Allin, Bt 1709.	Tory; Whig
Dunwich (seat 2/2)	Robert Kemp - unseated on petition Replaced by Daniel Harvey 1709	Tory; Whig
Durham (City of) (seat 1/2)	Thomas Conyers	Tory
Durham (City of) (seat 2/2)	James Nicolson	Whig
Durham (County) (seat 1/2)	Hon. William Vane	Whig
Durham (County) (seat 2/2)	Sir Robert Eden, Bt	Tory
Dysart Burghs (seat 1/1)	Hon. John Sinclair - ineligible as the eldest son of a Scottish peer Replaced by James Abercrombie 1710	Tory; Whig
== E ==
East Grinstead (seat 1/2)	Hon. Richard Lumley	Whig
East Grinstead (seat 2/2)	Henry Campion	Tory
East Looe (seat 1/2)	Sir Henry Seymour	Tory
East Looe (seat 2/2)	Harry Trelawny	Tory
East Retford (seat 1/2)	Thomas White	Whig
East Retford (seat 2/2)	William Levinz	Tory
Edinburgh (seat 1/1)	Sir Samuel MacClellan - died Replaced by Sir Patrick Johnston 1709	? Whig
Edinburghshire (seat 1/1)	George Lockhart	Tory
Elgin Burghs (seat 1/1)	Hon. Patrick Ogilvy	Whig
Elginshire (seat 1/1)	Robert Urquhart	Whig
Essex (seat 1/2)	Sir Francis Masham	Whig
Essex (seat 2/2)	Thomas Middleton	Whig
Evesham (seat 1/2)	Sir Edward Goodere	Whig
Evesham (seat 2/2)	John Rudge	Whig
Exeter (seat 1/2)	Nicholas Wood	Tory
Exeter (seat 2/2)	John Harris	Whig
Eye (seat 1/2)	Hon. Spencer Compton	Whig
Eye (seat 2/2)	Sir Joseph Jekyll	Whig
== F ==
Fife (seat 1/1)	Patrick Moncreiff -died Replaced by Sir Robert Anstruther 1710	? ?
Flint Boroughs (seat 1/1)	Sir John Conway	Tory
Flintshire (seat 1/1)	Sir Roger Mostyn	Tory
Forfarshire (seat 1/1)	John Carnegie	Tory
Fowey (seat 1/2)	George Granville	Tory
Fowey (seat 2/2)	Henry Vincent	Ind.
== G ==
Gatton (seat 1/2)	Sir George Newland	Tory
Gatton (seat 2/2)	Paul Docminique	Tory
Glamorganshire (seat 1/1)	Sir Thomas Mansel	Tory
Glasgow Burghs (seat 1/1)	Robert Rodger	Whig
Gloucester (seat 1/2)	William Cooke - died Replaced by Francis Wyndham 1709	Whig; Whig
Gloucester (seat 2/2)	Thomas Webb	Tory
Gloucestershire (seat 1/2)	Matthew Ducie Moreton	Whig
Gloucestershire (seat 2/2)	Sir John Guise	Ind.
Grampound (seat 1/2)	James Craggs	Whig
Grampound (seat 2/2)	Thomas Scawen	Whig
Grantham (seat 1/2)	Marquess of Granby	Whig
Grantham (seat 2/2)	Sir William Ellys	Whig
Great Bedwyn (seat 1/2)	Lord Bruce	Tory
Great Bedwyn (seat 2/2)	Sir Samuel Sambrooke	Tory
Great Grimsby (seat 1/2)	Arthur Moore	Tory
Great Grimsby (seat 2/2)	William Cotesworth	Whig
Great Marlow (seat 1/2)	Sir James Etheridge	Tory
Great Marlow (seat 2/2)	James Chase	Whig
Great Yarmouth (seat 1/2)	Richard Ferrier	Tory
Great Yarmouth (seat 2/2)	Hon. Roger Townshend died Replaced by Nathaniel Symonds	Whig; Whig
Guildford (seat 1/2)	Denzil Onslow	Whig
Guildford (seat 2/2)	Morgan Randyll	Tory
== H ==
Haddington Burghs (seat 1/1)	Hon. Sir David Dalrymple	Whig
Haddingtonshire (seat 1/1)	John Cockburn	Whig
Hampshire (seat 1/2)	Marquess of Winchester	Whig
Hampshire (seat 2/2)	Viscount Woodstock - succeeded to peerage Replaced by Thomas Jervoise 1709	Whig; Whig
Harwich (seat 1/2)	Sir John Leake - sat for Rochester; Replaced by Kenrick Edisbury 1708	? ?
Harwich (seat 2/2)	Thomas Frankland	Whig
Haslemere (seat 1/2)	Thomas Onslow - sat for Bletchingley; Replaced by Nicholas Carew 1708	Whig; Whig
Haslemere (seat 2/2)	Theophilus Oglethorpe	Tory
Hastings (seat 1/2)	John Pulteney	Whig
Hastings (seat 2/2)	Hon. William Ashburnham - succeeded to peerage Replaced by John Ashburnham	Tory; Tory
Haverfordwest (seat 1/1)	John Laugharne	Tory
Hedon (seat 1/2)	William Pulteney	Whig
Hedon (seat 2/2)	Hugh Cholmley	Whig
Helston (seat 1/2)	Viscount Rialton - sat for Oxfordshire; Replaced by Sir John Evelyn, Bt 1708	Whig; Whig
Helston (seat 2/2)	Sidney Godolphin	?
Hereford (seat 1/2)	Hon. James Brydges	?
Hereford (seat 2/2)	Thomas Foley	Tory
Herefordshire (seat 1/2)	The 3rd Viscount Scudamore	Tory
Herefordshire (seat 2/2)	John Prise	Tory
Hertford (seat 1/2)	Sir Thomas Clarke	Whig
Hertford (seat 2/2)	William Monson	Whig
Hertfordshire (seat 1/2)	Ralph Freman	Tory
Hertfordshire (seat 2/2)	Thomas Halsey	Tory
Heytesbury (seat 1/2)	Edward Ashe	Whig
Heytesbury (seat 2/2)	William Ashe	Whig
Higham Ferrers (seat 1/1)	Hon. Thomas Watson-Wentworth	Whig
Hindon (seat 1/2)	Sir James Howe	Tory
Hindon (seat 2/2)	Edmund Lambert	Tory
Honiton (seat 1/2)	Sir William Drake	Tory
Honiton (seat 2/2)	Sir Walter Yonge	Whig
Horsham (seat 1/2)	Charles Eversfield	Tory
Horsham (seat 2/2)	John Wicker	Whig
Huntingdon (seat 1/2)	Edward Wortley Montagu	Whig
Huntingdon (seat 2/2)	Francis Page	Whig
Huntingdonshire (seat 1/2)	John Proby	Ind.
Huntingdonshire (seat 2/2)	John Pocklington	Whig
Hythe (seat 1/2)	Hon. John Fane	Whig
Hythe (seat 2/2)	John Boteler	Tory
== I ==
Ilchester (seat 1/2)	Edward Phelips	Tory
Ilchester (seat 2/2)	James Johnston	Tory
Inverness Burghs (seat 1/1)	Alexander Duff	Tory
Inverness-shire (seat 1/1)	Alexander Grant	Whig
Ipswich (seat 1/2)	William Churchill	Whig
Ipswich (seat 2/2)	Sir William Barker	Whig
== K ==
Kent (seat 1/2)	Sir Thomas Palmer	Whig
Kent (seat 2/2)	Sir Stephen Lennard - died Replaced by David Polhill 1710	Whig; Whig
Kincardineshire (seat 1/1)	Sir David Ramsay	?
King's Lynn (seat 1/2)	Sir Charles Turner	Whig
King's Lynn (seat 2/2)	Robert Walpole	Whig
Kingston upon Hull (seat 1/2)	Sir William St Quintin	Whig
Kingston upon Hull (seat 2/2)	William Maister	Whig
Kinross-shire (seat 0/0)	unrepresented in this Parliament	
Kirkcudbright Stewartry (seat 1/1)	John Stewart	Whig
Knaresborough (seat 1/2)	Christopher Stockdale	Whig
Knaresborough (seat 2/2)	Robert Byerley	Tory
== L ==
Lanarkshire (seat 1/1)	Lord Archibald Hamilton	Whig
Lancashire (seat 1/2)	Hon. Charles Zedenno Stanley	Whig
Lancashire (seat 2/2)	Richard Shuttleworth	Tory
Lancaster (seat 1/2)	Robert Heysham	Tory
Lancaster (seat 2/2)	William Heysham	Tory
Launceston (seat 1/2)	Lord Hyde	Tory
Launceston (seat 2/2)	William Cary	?
Leicester (seat 1/2)	Sir George Beaumont	Tory
Leicester (seat 2/2)	James Winstanley	Tory
Leicestershire (seat 1/2)	Geoffrey Palmer	Tory
Leicestershire (seat 2/2)	Sir Gilbert Pickering	Whig
Leominster (seat 1/2)	The 1st Lord Coningsby	Whig
Leominster (seat 2/2)	Edward Harley	Tory
Lewes (seat 1/2)	Peter Gott - sat for Sussex; Replaced by Samuel Gott 1708	Whig; Whig
Lewes (seat 2/2)	Thomas Pelham	Whig
Lichfield (seat 1/2)	John Cotes	Tory
Lichfield (seat 2/2)	Sir Michael Biddulph	Whig
Lincoln (seat 1/2)	Sir Thomas Meres	Tory
Lincoln (seat 2/2)	Thomas Lister	Tory
Lincolnshire (seat 1/2)	Lord Willoughby d'Eresby	Tory
Lincolnshire (seat 2/2)	George Whichcot	Whig
Linlithgow Burghs (seat 1/1)	Hon. George Douglas	Whig
Linlithgowshire (seat 1/1)	Lord Johnstone - ineligible as son of Scottish peer Replaced by John Houstoun 1708	? Tory
Liskeard (seat 1/2)	William Bridges	?
Liskeard (seat 2/2)	John Dolben	Whig
Liverpool (seat 1/2)	Sir Thomas Johnson	Whig
Liverpool (seat 2/2)	Richard Norris	Whig
London (City of) (seat 1/4)	Sir William Withers	Tory
London (City of) (seat 2/4)	Sir William Ashurst	Whig
London (City of) (seat 3/4)	Sir Gilbert Heathcote	Whig
London (City of) (seat 4/4)	John Ward	Whig
Lostwithiel (seat 1/2)	Joseph Addison - unseated on petition Replaced by Francis Robartes 1709.	Whig ?
Lostwithiel (seat 2/2)	James Kendall - unseated on petition Replaced by Russell Robartes 1709 - sat for Bodmin; Replaced by Horatio Walpole 1710	Whig; Whig ?
Ludgershall (seat 1/2)	Hon. Robert Bruce	Tory
Ludgershall (seat 2/2)	John Richmond Webb	Tory
Ludlow (seat 1/2)	Sir Thomas Powys	Tory
Ludlow (seat 2/2)	Acton Baldwyn	Tory
Lyme Regis (seat 1/2)	John Burridge	Whig
Lyme Regis (seat 2/2)	Thomas Freke	Whig
Lymington (seat 1/2)	Paul Burrard	Whig
Lymington (seat 2/2)	Richard Chaundler	Whig
== M ==
Maidstone (seat 1/2)	Sir Thomas Culpeper	Whig
Maidstone (seat 2/2)	Sir Robert Marsham	Whig
Maldon (seat 1/2)	Sir Richard Child	Tory
Maldon (seat 2/2)	Thomas Richmond	Whig
Malmesbury (seat 1/2)	Hon. Henry Mordaunt - died Replaced by Joseph Addison 1710	Whig; Whig
Malmesbury (seat 2/2)	Thomas Farrington	Whig
Malton (seat 1/2)	William Palmes	Whig
Malton (seat 2/2)	William Strickland	Whig
Marlborough (seat 1/2)	Earl of Hertford - sat for Northumberland; Replaced by Edward Ernle, Bt 1708	Whig; Whig
Marlborough (seat 2/2)	Hon. James Bruce	Tory
Merionethshire (seat 1/1)	Richard Vaughan	Tory
Middlesex (seat 1/2)	Sir John Wolstenholme - died Replaced by John Austen 1708	Whig; Whig
Middlesex (seat 2/2)	Scorie Barker	Whig
Midhurst (seat 1/2)	Lawrence Alcock	Tory
Midhurst (seat 2/2)	Robert Orme - election voided Replaced by Thomas Meredyth, Mar 1709	Tory; Whig
Milborne Port (seat 1/2)	Sir Thomas Travell	Whig
Milborne Port (seat 2/2)	Thomas Medlycott - sat for Westminster; Replaced by Thomas Smith 1709	Tory; Whig
Minehead (seat 1/2)	Sir John Trevelyan	Tory
Minehead (seat 2/2)	Sir Jacob Bancks	Tory
Mitchell (seat 1/2)	Hugh Fortescue	Whig
Mitchell (seat 2/2)	Sir William Hodges	Whig
Monmouth Boroughs (seat 1/1)	Clayton Milborne	Tory
Monmouthshire (seat 1/2)	John Morgan	Whig
Monmouthshire (seat 2/2)	The 1st Viscount Windsor	Tory
Montgomery (seat 1/1)	John Pugh	Tory
Montgomeryshire (seat 1/1)	Edward Vaughan	Tory
Morpeth (seat 1/2)	Sir Richard Sandford	Whig
Morpeth (seat 2/2)	Sir John Bennett	Whig
== N ==
Nairnshire (seat 1/1)	Hugh Rose	Whig
Newark (seat 1/2)	Richard Sutton	Whig
Newark (seat 2/2)	Hon. James Saunderson	Whig
Newcastle-under-Lyme (seat 1/2)	Sir Thomas Bellot	Tory
Newcastle-under-Lyme (seat 2/2)	Rowland Cotton	Tory
Newcastle-upon-Tyne (seat 1/2)	William Carr	Whig
Newcastle-upon-Tyne (seat 2/2)	Sir Henry Liddell	Whig
Newport (Cornwall) (seat 1/2)	Sir Nicholas Morice	Tory
Newport (Cornwall) (seat 2/2)	Sir William Pole	Tory
Newport (Isle of Wight) (seat 1/2)	Sir Tristram Dillington	Whig
Newport (Isle of Wight) (seat 2/2)	William Stephens	Tory
New Radnor Boroughs (seat 1/1)	Robert Harley	Tory
New Romney (seat 1/2)	John Brewer	?
New Romney (seat 2/2)	Walter Whitfield	?
New Shoreham (seat 1/2)	Anthony Hammond - ineligible to sit Replaced by Sir Gregory Page, Bt 1708	Tory; Whig
New Shoreham (seat 2/2)	Richard Lloyd	Whig
Newton (Lancashire) (seat 1/2)	Thomas Legh	Tory
Newton (Lancashire) (seat 2/2)	John Ward	Tory
Newtown (Isle of Wight) (seat 1/2)	Sir James Worsley	Tory
Newtown (Isle of Wight) (seat 2/2)	Henry Worsley	Whig
New Windsor (seat 1/2)	The 4th Viscount Fitzhardinge	Whig
New Windsor (seat 2/2)	Richard Topham	Whig
New Woodstock (seat 1/2)	Sir Thomas Wheate	Whig
New Woodstock (seat 2/2)	William Cadogan	Whig
Norfolk (seat 1/2)	Sir John Holland	Whig
Norfolk (seat 2/2)	Ashe Windham	Whig
Northallerton (seat 1/2)	Sir William Hustler	Whig
Northallerton (seat 2/2)	Roger Gale	Whig
Northampton (seat 1/2)	George Montagu	Whig
Northampton (seat 2/2)	Francis Arundell	Tory
Northamptonshire (seat 1/2)	Sir Justinian Isham	Tory
Northamptonshire (seat 2/2)	Thomas Cartwright	Tory
Northumberland (seat 1/2)	Earl of Hertford	Whig
Northumberland (seat 2/2)	Thomas Forster	Tory
Norwich (seat 1/2)	Waller Bacon	Whig
Norwich (seat 2/2)	John Chambers	Whig
Nottingham (seat 1/2)	John Plumptre	Whig
Nottingham (seat 2/2)	Roby Sherwin	Whig
Nottinghamshire (seat 1/2)	Sir Thomas Willoughby	Tory
Nottinghamshire (seat 2/2)	John Thornhagh	Whig
== O ==
Okehampton (seat 1/2)	John Dibble	Whig
Okehampton (seat 2/2)	William Harris - died Replaced by Christopher Harris 1709	? Tory
Old Sarum (seat 1/2)	William Harvey	Tory
Old Sarum (seat 2/2)	Robert Pitt	Tory
Orford (seat 1/2)	Clement Corrance	Tory
Orford (seat 2/2)	Sir Edward Turnour - unseated on petition Replaced by William Thompson, Jan 1709	Tory; Whig
Orkney and Shetland (seat 1/1)	Sir Alexander Douglas	?
Oxford (seat 1/2)	Sir John Walter	Tory
Oxford (seat 2/2)	Thomas Rowney	Tory
Oxfordshire (seat 1/2)	Viscount Rialton	Whig
Oxfordshire (seat 2/2)	Sir Robert Jenkinson - died Replaced by Sir Robert Jenkinson 1710	Tory; Tory
Oxford University (seat 1/2)	Sir William Whitelock	Tory
Oxford University (seat 2/2)	Wiliam Bromley	Tory
== P ==
Peeblesshire (seat 1/1)	William Morison	Whig
Pembroke Boroughs (seat 1/1)	Sir Arthur Owen	Whig
Pembrokeshire (seat 1/1)	Wirriot Owen	Whig
Penryn (seat 1/2)	James Vernon	Whig
Penryn (seat 2/2)	Samuel Trefusis	Tory
Perth Burghs (seat 1/1)	Joseph Austin	Whig
Perthshire (seat 1/1)	Dougal Stewart	Whig
Peterborough (seat 1/2)	Hon. Sidney Wortley Montagu	Whig
Peterborough (seat 2/2)	Sir Gilbert Dolben	Tory
Petersfield (seat 1/2)	Leonard Bilson	Tory
Petersfield (seat 2/2)	Norton Powlett	Whig
Plymouth (seat 1/2)	Charles Trelawny	Tory
Plymouth (seat 2/2)	Sir George Byng	Whig
Plympton Erle (seat 1/2)	Richard Edgcumbe	Whig
Plympton Erle (seat 2/2)	George Treby	Whig
Pontefract (seat 1/2)	Sir John Bland	Tory
Pontefract (seat 2/2)	William Lowther	Whig
Poole (seat 1/2)	William Lewen	Tory
Poole (seat 2/2)	Thomas Ridge	Whig
Portsmouth (seat 1/2)	George Churchill	Tory
Portsmouth (seat 2/2)	Thomas Erle - sat for Wareham; Replaced by Sir Thomas Littleton 1708	Whig; Whig
Preston (seat 1/2)	Henry Fleetwood	Tory
Preston (seat 2/2)	Arthur Maynwaring	Whig
== Q ==
Queenborough (seat 1/2)	Henry Withers	Whig
Queenborough (seat 2/2)	Sir John Jennings	Whig
== R ==
Radnorshire (seat 1/1)	Thomas Harley	Tory
Reading (seat 1/2)	Owen Buckingham	Whig
Reading (seat 2/2)	Anthony Blagrave	Tory
Reigate (seat 1/2)	James Cocks	Whig
Reigate (seat 2/2)	Sir John Parsons	Tory
Renfrewshire (seat 1/1)	Sir John Shaw	Whig
Richmond (Yorkshire) (seat 1/2)	Thomas Yorke	Whig
Richmond (Yorkshire) (seat 2/2)	Hon. Harry Mordaunt	Whig
Ripon (seat 1/2)	John Aislabie	Ind.
Ripon (seat 2/2)	John Sharp	Tory
Rochester (seat 1/2)	Sir Stafford Fairborne	Whig
Rochester (seat 2/2)	Sir John Leake	?
Ross-shire (seat 1/1)	Hugh Rose - election void Replaced by Charles Rosse 1710	Whig; Ind. Whig
Roxburghshire (seat 1/1)	Sir Gilbert Eliott	Whig
Rutland (seat 1/2)	Philip Sherard	Whig
Rutland (seat 2/2)	Richard Halford	Tory
Rye (seat 1/2)	Phillips Gybbon	Whig
Rye (seat 2/2)	Sir John Norris	Whig
== S ==
St Albans (seat 1/2)	John Gape	Tory
St Albans (seat 2/2)	Joshua Lomax	Whig
St Germans (seat 1/2)	Edward Eliot	Tory
St Germans (seat 2/2)	Francis Scobell	Tory
St Ives (seat 1/2)	John Praed	Tory
St Ives (seat 2/2)	John Borlase	?
St Mawes (seat 1/2)	Francis Godfrey	Whig
St Mawes (seat 2/2)	John Tredenham	Tory
Salisbury (seat 1/2)	Robert Eyre	Whig
Salisbury (seat 2/2)	Charles Fox	Tory
Saltash (seat 1/2)	James Buller - sat for Cornwall; Replaced by Sir Cholmeley Dering 1710	Tory; Tory
Saltash (seat 2/2)	Alexander Pendarves	Tory
Sandwich (seat 1/2)	Sir Henry Furnese	Whig
Sandwich (seat 2/2)	Josiah Burchett	Whig
Scarborough (seat 1/2)	William Thompson	Whig
Scarborough (seat 2/2)	John Hungerford	Tory
Seaford (seat 1/2)	William Lowndes	Whig
Seaford (seat 2/2)	George Naylor	Whig
Selkirkshire (seat 1/1)	John Pringle	?
Shaftesbury (seat 1/2)	Sir John Cropley	Whig
Shaftesbury (seat 2/2)	Edward Nicholas	Tory
Shrewsbury (seat 1/2)	John Kynaston - unseated on petition Replaced by Sir Edward Leighton, Bt, Dec 1709	Tory; Whig
Shrewsbury (seat 2/2)	Richard Mytton - unseated on petition Not replaced.	Tory
Shropshire (seat 1/2)	Sir Robert Corbet	Whig
Shropshire (seat 2/2)	Hon. Henry Newport	Whig
Somerset (seat 1/2)	Henry Seymour Portman	Tory
Somerset (seat 2/2)	John Prowse - died Replaced by Sir William Wyndham 1710	Tory; Tory
Southampton (seat 1/2)	Viscount Woodstock - sat for Hampshire; Replaced by Simeon Stuart 1708	Whig; Tory
Southampton (seat 2/2)	Adam de Cardonnel	Whig
Southwark (seat 1/2)	Charles Cox	Whig
Southwark (seat 2/2)	John Cholmley	Whig
Stafford (seat 1/2)	Thomas Foley	Tory
Stafford (seat 2/2)	Walter Chetwynd	Whig
Staffordshire (seat 1/2)	Hon. Henry Paget	Tory
Staffordshire (seat 2/2)	John Wrottesley	Tory
Stamford (seat 1/2)	Hon. Charles Cecil	Tory
Stamford (seat 2/2)	Hon. Charles Bertie	Tory
Steyning (seat 1/2)	Robert Fagge	?
Steyning (seat 2/2)	Viscount Tunbridge	Whig
Stirling Burghs (seat 1/1)	John Erskine	Whig
Stirlingshire (seat 1/1)	Henry Cunningham	Whig
Stockbridge (seat 1/2)	Sir John Hawles	Whig
Stockbridge (seat 2/2)	Sir Edward Lawrence	Whig
Sudbury (seat 1/2)	Philip Skippon	Whig
Sudbury (seat 2/2)	Sir Hervey Elwes	Whig
Suffolk (seat 1/2)	Sir Thomas Hanmer	Tory
Suffolk (seat 2/2)	Sir Robert Davers	Tory
Surrey (seat 1/2)	Sir Richard Onslow	Whig
Surrey (seat 2/2)	Sir William Scawen	Whig
Sussex (seat 1/2)	Sir Henry Peachey	Whig
Sussex (seat 2/2)	Peter Gott	Whig
Sutherland (seat 1/1)	Sir William Gordon	Whig
== T ==
Tain Burghs (seat 1/1)	Lord Strathnaver - ineligible as eldest son of a Scotch peer Replaced by Robert Douglas 1709	? ?
Tamworth (seat 1/2)	Joseph Girdler	Tory
Tamworth (seat 2/2)	Richard Swinfen	Whig
Taunton (seat 1/2)	Sir Francis Warre	Tory
Taunton (seat 2/2)	Edward Clarke	Whig
Tavistock (seat 1/2)	Sir John Cope	Whig
Tavistock (seat 2/2)	Henry Manaton	Tory
Tewkesbury (seat 1/2)	Richard Dowdeswell	Whig
Tewkesbury (seat 2/2)	Henry Ireton	Whig
Thetford (seat 1/2)	Robert Baylis	Whig
Thetford (seat 2/2)	Thomas de Grey	Whig
Thirsk (seat 1/2)	Sir Thomas Frankland	Whig
Thirsk (seat 2/2)	Sir Godfrey Copley - died Replaced by Leonard Smelt 1709	Tory; Whig
Tiverton (seat 1/2)	Thomas Bere	Whig
Tiverton (seat 2/2)	Richard Mervin	Tory
Totnes (seat 1/2)	Sir Edward Seymour	Tory
Totnes (seat 2/2)	George Courtenay	Tory
Tregony (seat 1/2)	Anthony Nicoll	Whig
Tregony (seat 2/2)	Thomas Herne	Tory
Truro (seat 1/2)	Hon. James Brydges - sat for Hereford; Replaced by Robert Furnese 1708	Whig; Whig
Truro (seat 2/2)	Henry Vincent	Whig
== W ==
Wallingford (seat 1/2)	William Jennens - died Replaced by Thomas Renda 1709	? ?
Wallingford (seat 2/2)	Grey Neville	Whig
Wareham (seat 1/2)	Thomas Erle	Whig
Wareham (seat 2/2)	George Pitt	Tory
Warwick (seat 1/2)	Hon. Francis Greville	Tory
Warwick (seat 2/2)	Hon. Dodington Greville	?
Warwickshire (seat 1/2)	Sir John Mordaunt	Tory
Warwickshire (seat 2/2)	Andrew Archer	Tory
Wells (seat 1/2)	Edward Colston	Tory
Wells (seat 2/2)	William Coward	?
Wendover (seat 1/2)	Thomas Ellys - died Replaced by Henry Grey 1709	? Whig
Wendover (seat 2/2)	Sir Roger Hill	Whig
Wenlock (seat 1/2)	Sir William Forester	Whig
Wenlock (seat 2/2)	Thomas Weld	?
Weobley (seat 1/2)	John Birch	Whig
Weobley (seat 2/2)	Hon. Henry Thynne - sat for Weymouth and Melcombe Regis; Replaced by Henry Gorges 1708	Tory ?
Westbury (seat 1/2)	Hon. Henry Bertie	Tory
Westbury (seat 2/2)	Francis Annesley	?
West Looe (seat 1/2)	Sir Charles Hedges	Tory
West Looe (seat 2/2)	John Conyers	?
Westminster (seat 1/2)	Hon. Henry Boyle	Whig
Westminster (seat 2/2)	Thomas Medlycott	Tory
Westmorland (seat 1/2)	Daniel Wilson	Whig
Westmorland (seat 2/2)	James Grahme	?
Weymouth and Melcombe Regis (seat 1/4)	Hon. Henry Thynne - died Replaced by Edward Clavell 1709	Tory ?
Weymouth and Melcombe Regis (seat 2/4)	Charles Churchill	Tory
Weymouth and Melcombe Regis (seat 3/4)	Hon. Maurice Ashley	Whig
Weymouth and Melcombe Regis (seat 4/4)	Anthony Henley	Whig
Whitchurch (seat 1/2)	Frederick Tylney - election void Replaced by Richard Wollaston, Dec 1708	? ?
Whitchurch (seat 2/2)	Thomas Lewis- election void Replaced by George William Brydges, Dec 1708	Tory Whig
Wigan (seat 1/2)	Sir Roger Bradshaigh	Tory
Wigan (seat 2/2)	Henry Bradshaigh	?
Wigtown Burghs (seat 1/1)	George Lockhart - sat for Edinburghshire; Replaced by William Cochrane 1708	Tory Tory
Wigtownshire (seat 1/1)	Hon. John Stewart	?
Wilton (seat 1/2)	Sir Lambert Blackwell	Whig
Wilton (seat 2/2)	Charles Mompesson	?
Wiltshire (seat 1/2)	Sir Richard Howe	Tory
Wiltshire (seat 2/2)	Robert Hyde	?
Winchelsea (seat 1/2)	George Dodington - sat for Bridgwater; Replaced by Robert Bristow 1708	Whig ?
Winchelsea (seat 2/2)	Sir Francis Dashwood	Whig
Winchester (seat 1/2)	Lord William Powlett	?
Winchester (seat 2/2)	George Rodney Brydges	Whig
Wootton Bassett (seat 1/2)	Francis Popham	?
Wootton Bassett (seat 2/2)	Hon. Robert Cecil	Whig
Worcester (seat 1/2)	Thomas Wylde	?
Worcester (seat 2/2)	Samuel Swift	Tory
Worcestershire (seat 1/2)	Sir John Pakington	Tory
Worcestershire (seat 2/2)	Sir Thomas Winford	?
== Y ==
Yarmouth (Isle of Wight) (seat 1/2)	Henry Holmes	Tory
Yarmouth (Isle of Wight) (seat 2/2)	Anthony Morgan	Whig
York (seat 1/2)	Sir William Robinson	Whig
York (seat 2/2)	Robert Benson	Tory
Yorkshire (seat 1/2)	The 2nd Viscount Downe	Tory
Yorkshire (seat 2/2)	Sir William Strickland	Whig

== By-elections ==
- List of Great Britain by-elections (1707–15)

== See also ==
- 1708 British general election
- List of parliaments of Great Britain
- Unreformed House of Commons
