= Richard Bingham =

Richard Bingham may refer to:

- Richard Bingham (soldier) (1528–1599), English soldier and naval commander, Governor of Connacht
- Richard Bingham, 2nd Earl of Lucan (1764–1839), British MP for St Albans, Irish representative peer
- Richard Bingham (Conservative politician) (1915–1992), British MP for Liverpool Garston, Judge of Appeal for the Isle of Man
- Richard John Bingham, 7th Earl of Lucan (born 1934), British peer, disappeared in 1974, following the murder of his children's nanny
- Richard Bingham (died 1735), English MP for Bridport and Dorset
