= Edward Seymour (Shaftesbury MP, died 1711) =

English Member of Parliament

Member of the Parliament of England for Shaftesbury
- In office 1710 – February 1711 Serving with Edward Nicholas

Personal details
- Died: 1711
- Relations: Seymour family

Edward Seymour (died 1711) was an English politician who served as a Member of Parliament (MP) for Shaftesbury. He was born into the Seymour family.

== See also ==
- List of MPs elected in the 1710 British general election
