= Richard Fownes =

English Member of Parliament (1652–1714)

MP for Corfe Castle
- In office 1681–1714

Richard Fownes (25 August 1652 – 20 July 1714) was an English politician who sat in the House of Commons representing Corfe Castle.

== See also ==
- List of MPs elected in the 1708 British general election
- List of members of the House of Commons at Westminster 1705–1708
- List of MPs elected in the 1710 British general election
- List of MPs elected to the English Parliament in 1689
- List of MPs elected in the 1713 British general election
