= Henry Whitaker (died 1746) =

English Member of Parliament

Member of the Parliament of England for Shaftesbury
- In office 26 March 1711 – 1715 Serving with Edward Nicholas

High Sheriff of Dorset
- In office 1737–1737

Personal details
- Born: 1686
- Died: 1746 (aged 59–60)
- Education: New College, Oxford

Henry Whitaker (1686–1746) was an English politician who served as a Member of Parliament (MP) for Shaftesbury.

== See also ==
- List of MPs elected in the 1710 British general election
- List of MPs elected in the 1713 British general election
