= Linlithgowshire (Parliament of Scotland constituency) =

Before the Acts of Union 1707, the barons of the shire of Linlithgow elected commissioners to represent them in the unicameral Parliament of Scotland and in the Convention of the Estates.

From 1708 Linlithgowshire was represented by one Member of Parliament in the House of Commons of Great Britain.

== List of shire commissioners ==
- 1628–29: Thomas Dalyell of Binns
- 1629: Robert Hamilton of Bathgate
- 1628-33: Sir Walter Dundas of that Ilk
- 1628–1633, 1630 (convention), 1639: William Drummond of Riccarton
- 1639–41, 1643–44, 1650: George Dundas of that Ilk
- 1640–41: Sir John Stirling of Garden
- 1643–44: Cochran of Barbachla
- 1644, 1644–47: Samuel Drummond of Carlowrie
- 1644, 1644–47, 1648: Laird of Maner (George Dundas)
- 1645–46: Laird of Boighall (Hamilton)
- 1646–47, 1648: Laird of Binning (Hamilton)
- 1649: William Sandilands of Hilderston
- 1649–50: George Dundas of Duddingston
- 1661–63, 1667 (convention): Sir Archibald Stirling of Garden, Lord Garden, Senator of College of Justice
- 1661, 1685–86, 1689 (convention), 1689–98: Thomas Drummond of Riccarton (died c.1699)
- 1665 (convention), 1667 (convention), 1669–74: Sir Walter Seton of Abercorn
- 1669-74: James Dundas of Morton
- 1678 (convention), 1681–82, 1685–85 Tam Dalyell of the Binns (died 1685)
- 1678 (convention): William Sharp of Houston
- 1681–82: John Hope of Hopeton
- 1686, 1689 (convention), 1689–1701, 1702–03: Patrick Murray of Livingston (died c.1703)
- 1700–02, 1703–07: Thomas Sharp of Houston
- 1702–03: Charles Hope of Hopeton (died c.1703)
- 1704–07: John Montgomerie of Wrae

== See also ==
- List of constituencies in the Parliament of Scotland at the time of the Union
