= John Montgomerie (died 1725) =

Scottish businessman and politician

John Montgomerie (died 11 March 1725), of Wrae, Linlithgow, was a Scottish businessman, customs farmer and Whig politician who sat in the Parliament of Scotland from 1704 to 1707, and in the British House of Commons briefly in 1710.

== Early life ==
Montgomerie was the fifth son of George Montgomerie of Broomlands, Ayrshire, a minor Scottish laird. He trained as a writer to the signet in 1687. He married Penelope Barclay, daughter of Sir Robert Barclay of Perceton, Ayr on 2 February 1689. His second wife, whom he married in September 1696, was Janet Gray, daughter of Thomas Gray, merchant, of Edinburgh. In 1697 he acquired lands at Wrae in Linlithgowshire,

== Career ==
Montgomerie was returned as shire commissioner for Linlithgowshire in the Parliament of Scotland in 1704. He was a burgess of Edinburgh from 1706, and a director of the Bank of Scotland from 1706. In 1707, he became a Commissioner of Excise for Scotland. He supported the Union, but after the Union with England in 1707, he did not win a place as one of the Scottish representatives to the first Parliament of Great Britain in 1707.

Montgomerie unsuccessfully contested Linlithgowshire at the 1708 British general election, and was appointed as Under-secretary of State for Scotland in 1709, serving as private secretary to Lord Queensberry. He was returned as Member of Parliament for Buteshire at a by-election in February 1710, as a nominee of the county's patron Lord Bute. However, Buteshire was an alternating constituency (with Caithness) and was unrepresented in the next Parliament. As a Court supporter, he voted in favour of the impeachment of Dr Sacheverell in 1710. No alternative seat was found for Montgomerie at the general election in September 1710.

== Later life and legacy ==
Montgomerie's business failed in 1712–13, and he was pursued by the Treasury over customs funds. He died on 11 March 1725, and was succeeded by his son George.

Parliament of Scotland
Preceded by Charles Hope of Hopeton	Shire Commissioner for Linlithgowshire; 1704– 1707	Succeeded by Parliament of Great Britain
Parliament of Great Britain
Preceded by Dugald Stewart	Member of Parliament for Buteshire; February 1710 – September 1710	Vacant alternating constituency Title next held by John Campbell from 1713
