= Hopton Wyndham =

English politician (c. 1665–1697)

Hopton Wyndham (c. 1665 – 10 October 1697) was an English Tory politician. He sat as MP for Wells from 1690 till 1695.

He is the first son of Thomas Wyndham and Frances, the daughter of John Codrington. He was educated at Magdalen College, Oxford and matriculated on 15 July 1682 at the age of 17. He entered Lincoln's Inn in 1683. He married Jane Gifford, the widow of Fortescue Tynte. He died childless.
