= Thomas Davall (junior) =

Sir Thomas Davall (1682–1714), of Burr Street, Wapping, Middlesex, Dovercourt and Gray, Essex, was an English Member of Parliament.

He was the son of Thomas Davall senior. He was a Member (MP) of the Parliament of Great Britain for Harwich 1713 to April 1714.

Parliament of England
Preceded by Kenrick Edisbury; Thomas Frankland	Member of Parliament for Harwich; 1713 – April 1714; With: Carew Hervey Mildmay	Succeeded by Carew Hervey Mildmay; Thomas Heath
