= Samuel Batteley =

18th-century MP for Bury St Edmunds

Samuel Batteley was one of the two MPs for Bury St Edmunds between 1712 and 1713. He had previously been an apothecary.
