= Thomas Ellys =

18th-century English politician

Thomas Ellys (1685–1709), of Mitre Court, Inner Temple, was a Member of Parliament for Wendover in 1708 – 24 May 1709.
