= Francis Lewis (MP) =

English Member of Parliament

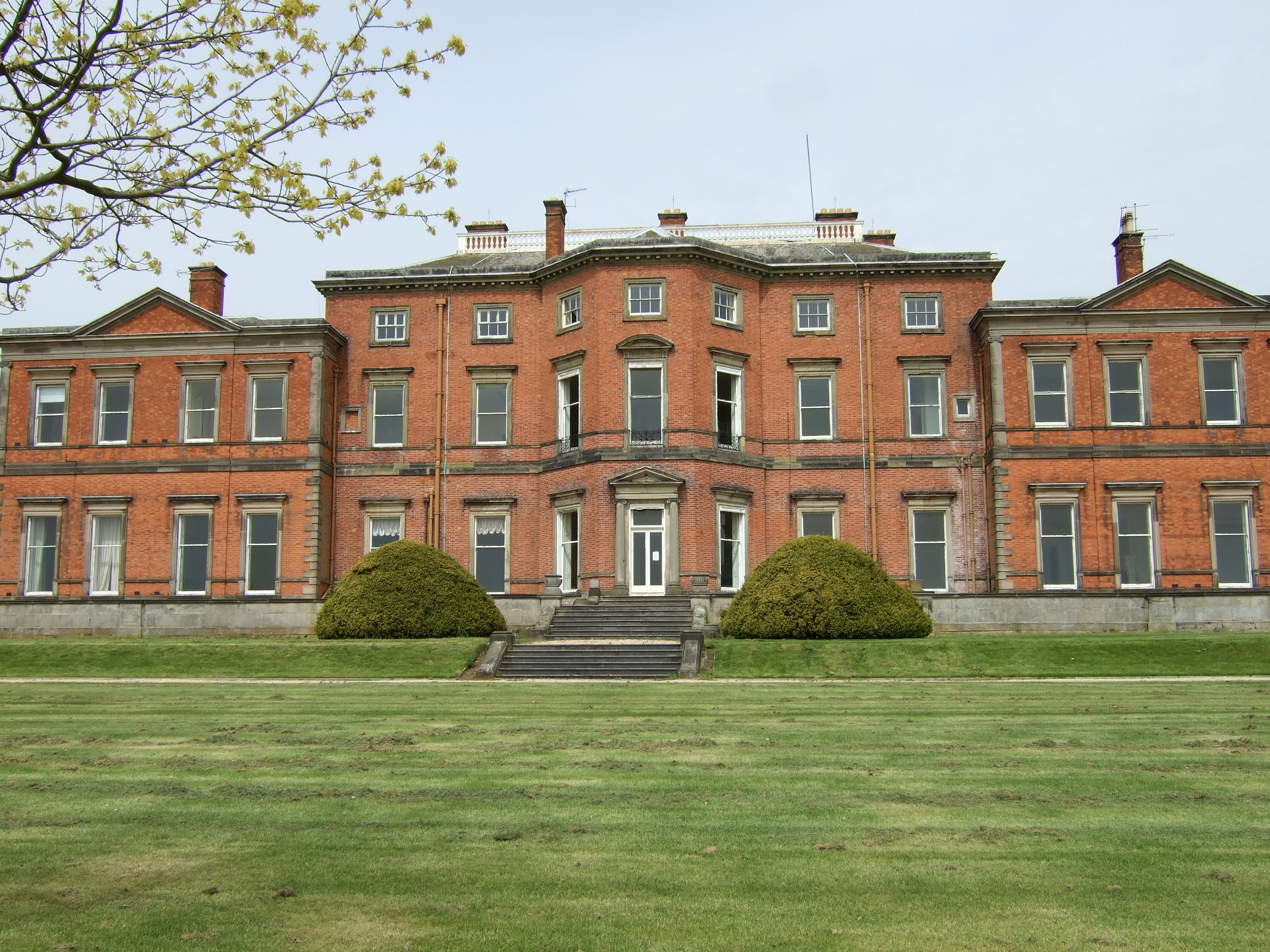
Stanford Hall, Nottinghamshire

Francis Lewis (c. 1692 – 3 March 1744) of Stanford Hall, Nottinghamshire was an English Member of Parliament.

He was the eldest surviving son of the merchant Thomas Lewes (died 1696) and educated at Trinity College, Oxford, matriculating in 1707 at the age of 15. He also attended New College, Oxford where he was awarded BCL in 1709. He succeeded his grandfather c.1702, inheriting Stanford Hall.

He was appointed High Sheriff of Nottinghamshire for 1713–14 and also returned unopposed as MP for East Retford in a by-election in April 1713 and elected again in a general election later the same year.

He died in 1744 and was buried in Stanford-on-Soar churchyard. He had married Sophia, the daughter of Sir Samuel Dashwood. They had two sons and a daughter. His son Charles succeeded him.
