= Robert Leeves =

British Member of Parliament (died 1743)

Robert Leeves (about 1685–1743) was an English politician who sat as Member of the Parliament of Great Britain for the constituency of Steyning in Sussex from 24 April 1713 to 8 August 1713 and again from 1715 to 12 April 1717.
