= Richard Bingham (died 1735) =

British politician (1667–1735)

Member of Parliament for Bridport
- In office 1702–1705

Member of Parliament for Dorset
- In office 25 April 1711 – 1713

Personal details
- Born: 1667
- Died: 1735 (aged 67–68)
- Party: Tory

Richard Bingham (1667–1735) was an English politician who was a member of parliament.

== See also ==
- List of MPs elected in the 1710 British general election
