= Edmund Pleydell =

English politician

Edmund Pleydell (c. 1652 – 23 November 1726), of Midgehall, Lydiard Tregoze, Wiltshire and Milborne St. Andrew, Dorset, was an English politician.

He was the eldest son of Oliver Pleydell of Milton, Oxfordshire. He succeeded his father by 1693 and his uncle John Pleydell to Midgehall in 1693.

He was a Member (MP) of the Parliament of England for Wootton Bassett from December 1710 to 1715.

He had married, by 1683, Anne, the daughter and heiress of Sir John Morton, 2nd Baronet and left 3 sons and 3 daughters. He divided his estates between his sons.
