= Richard Ferrier =

MP for Great Yarmouth

Richard Ferrier (c. 1671 – 4 December 1728) was an English Tory politician who served as MP for Great Yarmouth from 1708 till 1715.

== Family and education ==
He was baptised on 24 May 1671. He was the only surviving son of Richard Ferrier and Judith (nee Wilde). He was educated at Great Yarmouth and Sidney Sussex, Cambridge in 1685. In 1695, he married Ellen, the daughter of Robert Long, and had a son and five daughters.

== Political career ==
In 1708, he was elected as a Tory MP and described as sensible and active in parliament, focusing mostly on trade, commerce and local interests. He served on numerous drafting committees, particularly concerning fisheries, coal, African trade, and local infrastructure such as the Eddystone Lighthouse, Norwich workhouse, and Yarmouth causeway.

He opposed the impeachment of Henry Sacheverell and opposed importing French wines at one point. He played a leading role in ending the Royal African Company’s monopoly on African trade, chaired related committees, and acted as teller in key parliamentary divisions. He also supported local legislation, including building a new church in Yarmouth and adjusting salt duties to aid the fish trade.

Ferrier stepped down in 1715 but remained politically engaged, defending his son's government post when it was threatened, though the position was ultimately revoked. Later listed as a "loyal gentleman of Norfolk", he died on 4 December 1728 and was buried with great ceremony. However, it was said that his extravagance had significantly damaged the family's wealth, and political opponents mocked him even after his death.
