= William Berners (1679–1712) =

English Member of Parliament

William Berners (1679-1712), of Moore Place, Much Hadham, Hertfordshire, was an English Member of Parliament.

He was a Member (MP) of the Parliament of England for Hythe 27 January 1711 - c. 19 June 1712.
