= John Pugh (Tory politician) =

British Member of Parliament

John Pugh (c. 1675 – 30 November 1737) of Mathafarn, Llanwrin, Montgomeryshire, was a British lawyer and Tory politician who sat in the English and British House of Commons from 1705 to 1727.

Pugh was the eldest son of William Pugh of Mathafarn and his wife Margaret Lloyd, daughter of John Lloyd of Ceiswyn and Aberllefenni, Merionethshire. He was admitted at Inner Temple in 1690 and matriculated at Jesus College, Oxford on 13 June 1691, aged 15.In 1700 he was called to the bar. Having been appointed to the commission of the peace, he was removed in about 1702, but was then named as a Deputy Lieutenant for the county in 1703. He married Elizabeth Scudamore, daughter of John Scudamore, 2nd Viscount Scudamore in about.1708.

Pugh was returned unopposed as Member of Parliament for Cardiganshire at the 1705 general election, probably by the influence of Lewis Pryse and was restored to the commission of the peace. In Parliament he voted against the Court candidate in the division on the Speaker on 25 October 1705, and told on the Tory side on 22 January 1706. At the 1708 general election, he changed seats to Montgomery Boroughs, where his family had an interest and was returned unopposed. He was present at a meeting of Tory gentlemen in Aberystwyth in 1710 when Lewis Pryse and the assembled company drank the Pretender's health on their knees. He was a Tory on his unopposed return to Parliament in 1710 although frequently absent. At the 1713 general election, he was returned unopposed again. He was a teller on 29 June 1714 in a division on the Southwark election and on 12 August 1714 presented a bill to correct mistakes in the 1714 Land Tax Act.

Pugh was returned for Montgomery Boroughs at the 1715 general election but was inactive in Parliament. In 1719, he was taken into custody for defaulting on a call of the House. He succeeded his father in 1719 and became a dominant figure in Montgomeryshire politics. At the 1722 general election, he was returned again, with the help of Sir Watkin Williams Wynn, 3rd Baronet. He did not stand at the 1727 general election, but there was a double return at Montgomery and he was called to testify as a witness for the Tory candidate on the election petition.

Pugh died on 30 November 1737, and was buried at Llanwrin. He had one son who predeceased him. His heiress was a niece, the wife of Thomas Pryse of Gogerddan. The Mathafarn estate was subsequently sold to the trustees of Sir Watkin Williams Wynn for £33,400, and merged into the Wynnstay estate.

Parliament of England
Preceded by Sir Humphrey Mackworth	Member of Parliament for Cardiganshire; 1705–1708	Succeeded by Lewis Pryse
Parliament of Great Britain
Preceded by Charles Mason	Member of Parliament for Montgomery Boroughs; 1708–1727	Succeeded by (Sir) William Corbet
