= Richard Jones (died 1736) =

British MP

Richard Jones (died 1736) was the member of the Parliament of Great Britain for Marlborough for the parliament of 23 January 1712 to 1713 and for Salisbury for the parliament of 1713 to 1715.
