= Fleetwood Dormer =

English politician (died 1723)

Fleetwood Dormer (c. 1657/8 – 1723) was an English Whig politician and lawyer.

He sat as MP for Chipping Wycombe from 28 March 1696 till 1698 and again from 1701 till 1710. He sat as MP for Malmesbury from 30 November 1719 till 1722.

He was the third son of John Dormer and Katherine (nee Woodward) and was baptised on 4 April 1657/8. He was the brother of Sir John Dormer, 1st Baronet and Robert Dormer, who sat as MP. He was educated at Lincoln's Inn in 1676 and called to the bar in 1683, he became a bencher in 1707.

He was appointed recorder of Wycombe in August 1695. He was elected in the 1696 by-election for Wycombe and one of the first things he did was add his name to the Association on 4 April. He was defeated at Wycombe in 1698. He opposed the Tack and did not vote for it on 28 November 1704. He voted for John Smith as Speaker. In 1710, he voted for the impeachement of Dr. Henry Sacheverell.

He stood for Wycombe in 1710 but withdrew before the poll. In October 1714, he suffered a serious accident on his way from Wycombe to London, when he was thrown from his horse and broke his leg. In March 1718, he resigned his recordership of Wycombe.

He died in 1723 and was buried at Quainton on 21 October.
