= Sir William Gordon, 1st Baronet =

Scottish politician (died 1742)

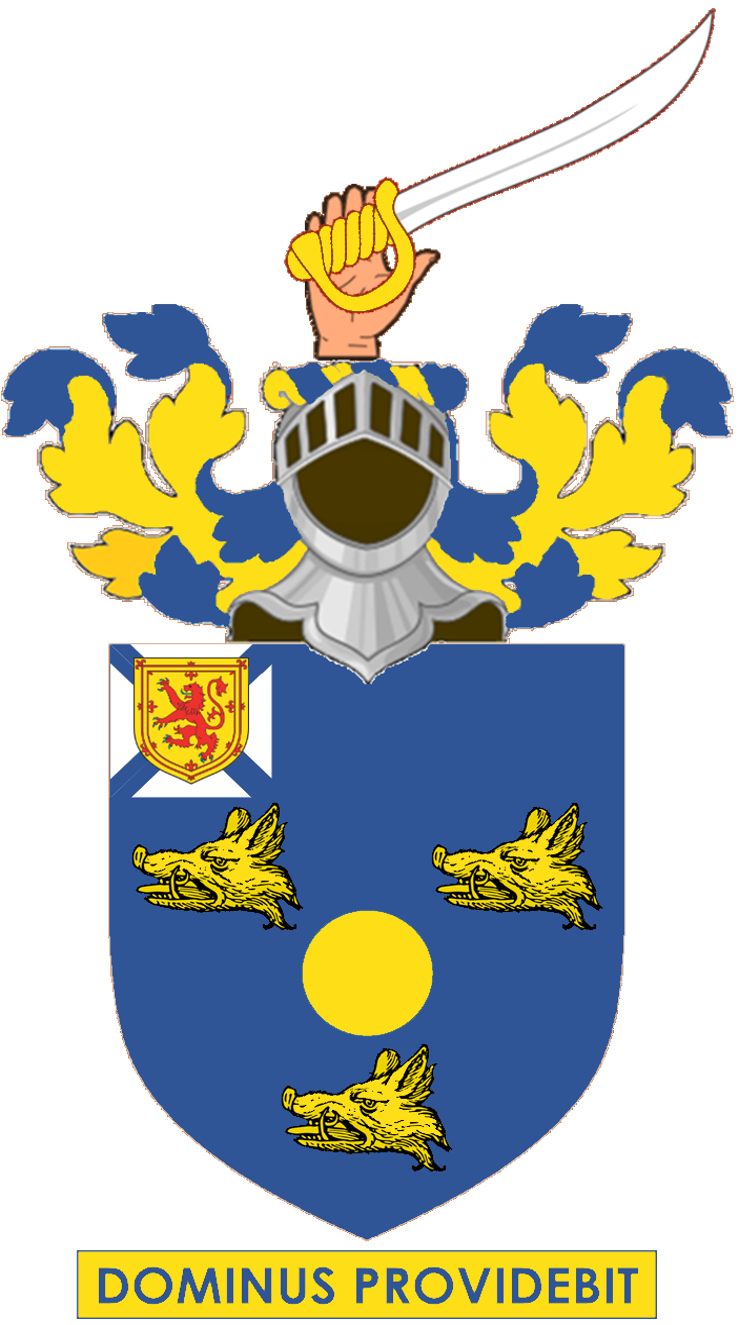
Arms: Azure a Bezant between three Boar's Heads erased Or in dexter chief a Canton of a Baronet of Nova Scotia; Crest: A Dexter Hand grasping a Sabre proper; Motto: Dominus Providebit (The Lord will provide)

Sir William Gordon, 1st Baronet (died 1742) was a Scottish politician who sat in the House of Commons between 1708 and 1742.

Gordon was the eldest son of Sir Adam Gordon of Dalpholly, Sutherland and his wife Anne Urquhart, daughter of Alexander Urquhart of Newhall, Ross. He succeeded his father in 1700, and by 1702 had acquired the estate of Inverbreakie, on the Cromarty Firth, which was renamed Invergordon. He was created baronet on 3 February 1704. He married firstly a daughter of Sir William Henderson, 2nd, Baronet of Fordel, Dalgety, Fife, but appears to have had no children by her. He married secondly Isabel Hamilton, daughter of Sir John Hamilton of Halcraig, Lanarkshire on 19 March 1704.

Gordon was burgess of Glasgow in 1704 and burgess of Edinburgh in 1708. At the 1708 general election he was returned as Member of Parliament for Sutherland. He was re-elected in 1710. However, by 1713, his servants had beaten and robbed a merchant who had called at his house to collect a debt and he was faced with a legal action. He also became involved in allegations of corruption against his brother who was a customs collector. At the 1713 general election, the Sutherland family who controlled the seat put forward an alternative candidate and Gordon had to stand aside. However his opponent decided to sit at Peeblesshire, and Gordon was returned at a by-election on 7 May 1714.

Gordon was returned unopposed at Sutherland in 1715 and was appointed a Commissioner for stating army debts also in 1715, a post he held until 1720. In about 1717 he became Sheriff of Ross and remained as such until 1725. He was re-elected MP for Sutherland at the 1722 general election but in 1727 he had to stand aside for another protégé of the Sutherland family. He contested at Sutherland in 1734 but was unsuccessful. At the 1741 general election he was returned as MP for Cromartyshire through the assistance of the 3rd Earl of Cromarty, who had married his daughter Isabella (‘Bonnie Bell Gordon’

Gordon's wife, Isabel died in 1740, and Gordon himself at Chelsea on 9 June 1742. He had four sons and five daughters. He was succeeded, in the estate, baronetcy (to 1783) and parliamentary seat (until 1761), by his eldest son, John (1707-1783).

Parliament of Great Britain
New constituency	Member of Parliament for Sutherland; 1708–1713	Succeeded by William Morison
Preceded by William Morison	Member of Parliament for Sutherland; 1714–1727	Succeeded by Lord Strathnaver
Preceded by Not represented in 1734; Previously Sir George Mackenzie	Member of Parliament for Cromartyshire; 1741–1742	Succeeded by Sir John Gordon
Baronetage of Nova Scotia
New creation	Baronet (of Dalpholly, Sutherland); 1704-1742	Succeeded by John Gordon
