= Joseph Weld (MP) =

Joseph Weld (1651–1712), of Bracon Ash, Norfolk, was an English Member of Parliament. He represented Bury St Edmunds (UK Parliament constituency) from 26 March 1709 to 18 January 1712.
