= Christopher Parker (MP) =

English politician (c. 1684–1713)

Christopher Parker (c. 1684 – January 1713) was an English Tory politician. He sat as MP for Clitheroe from 1708 till 1713.

He was the oldest son of Anthony Parker. He was educated at Gray's Inn in 1698. He was matriculated at Christ Church College, Oxford on 16 July 1703 at the age of 18. He married Margaret, the daughter of William Broome. He died without heir.
