= Kenrick Edisbury =

British Member of Parliament

Kenrick Edisbury (1670?–1736), of Deptford, Kent and Gresford, Denbighshire, was an English Member of Parliament.

He was a Member (MP) of the Parliament of Great Britain for Harwich from 24 January 1709 to 1713.

Parliament of Great Britain
Preceded by John Leake; Thomas Frankland	Member of Parliament for Harwich; 1709–1713; With: Thomas Frankland	Succeeded by Carew Hervey Mildmay; Thomas Davall (junior)
