= John Manley (1655–1713) =

English politician

John Manley (c. 1655 – 14/16 December 1713) was an English Tory politician and lawyer who sat as MP for Bossiney and Camelford.

== Family and education ==
He was baptized on 23 March 1655. He was the first son of John Manley and Margaret Dorislaus. He was educated at Gray's Inn in 1671, called to the bar in 1678 and became a bencher in 1706. On 19 January 1679, he married Anne, the daughter of Edward Grosse with £4000. They had 2 daughters (1 predeceased him), 1 son. Manley also had one illegitimate daughter. His father died in 1699.

== Political career ==
In 1685, he became a freeman of Truro and Liskeard and served as legal adviser to John Granville, 1st Earl of Bath

In 1689, he stood for Parliament at Truro but lost the seat. He was defeated in Truro again in 1690. In 1695, he returned unopposed for Bossiney. In February 1696, he refused to sign the Association. On 12 November 1696, he was imprisoned in the Tower of London after criticizing the government, he was later released after a petition. In 1698, he did not stand for re-election. He failed to win the Bossiney seat in January 1701 but he won it in the December 1701 election. He was again re-elected for Bossiney in 1705. In January 1707, he fought a duel with Thomas Dodson in Westminster and Dodson later died of his wounds. In 1708, he was re-elected for Camelford but appears to be inactive.

He voted against the impeachement of Dr. Henry Sacheverell. In 1710, he was returned unopposed again for Bossiney and in September was appointed surveyor-general under Robert Harley.

Manley died on either the 14 December or 16 December 1713.
