= Dugald Stewart, Lord Blairhall =

British Member of Parliament (died 1712)

Dougal or Dugald Stewart, Lord Blairhall MP (c.1658–1712) was a 17th/18th century Scottish judge, politician, and Senator of the College of Justice.

== Life ==
He was born in Rothesay on the Isle of Bute the son of Sir Dougal Stewart MP (d.1670), 2nd baronet of Ardmaleish on Bute, and his wife, Margaret Ruthven, daughter of John Ruthven of Dunglass. His brother James Stewart was the first Earl of Bute. His uncle was Robert Stewart, Lord Tillicutrie. The family were Episcopalians and Royalists, and suffered heavily in the English Civil War. They suffered further in refusing to swear an Oath of Allegiance to King William III in 1693

He studied law at Glasgow University from 1687 to 1691 and passed the Scottish bar as an advocate in 1694. From 1702 to 1707 he was MP for Rothesay.

He was made a Burgess of Edinburgh in 1703 and of Perth in 1710. He was Sheriff Depute of Edinburghshire (Midlothian) from 1704 to 1709.

He inherited the estate of Blairhall in Longforgan in Perthshire around 1705 through the death of his father-in-law.

He was strongly opposed to the Act of Union in 1707 and imprisoned in 1708 for allegedly supporting a Jacobite invasion but nevertheless was created the Member of Parliament for Banffshire later in the same year. He generally opposed the alignment of English and Scottish laws debated after 1707, and fought for the independence of Scots Law.

In June 1709 he was elected a Senator of the College of Justice under the title of Lord Blairhall, succeeding his uncle Robert Stewart.

He died at Blairhall on 16 June 1712.

== Family ==
In 1700 he married Mary Bruce (d.1759) daughter of John Bruce of Blairhall. They had two sons, James and John, and a daughter Jean, who married John Hamilton of Grange, Linlithgowshire.
