= Thomas Chafin (1675–1711) =

English politician

Thomas Chaffin (1675 – 1711) was an English Tory politician and the son of Thomas Chafin, who also sat as MP.

He sat as MP for Shaftesbury from 25 February 1699 till November 1701 and Dorset from 1702 till March 1711.

== Family and education ==
Thomas Chafin was baptised on 27 January 1675. He was the eldest son of Thomas Chafin, who also sat as MP. He was educated at Wadham College, Oxford and graduated in 1693.

== Parliamentary career ==
Chafin was elected to Shaftesbury as a Tory in a by-election in 1699 and remained aligned with the party throughout his career. After representing Shaftesbury, he became MP for the county of Dorset in 1702 and held his seat until his death. He repeatedly supported High Church Tory positions. He voted against the impeachment of Dr Henry Sacheverell and later joined the October Club.

He died in 1711 and was buried at Chettle on 16 March 1711.
