= Edward Nicholas (1662–1726) =

English politician (1662–1726)

Edward Nicholas (24 February 1662 – 20 April 1726) was an English politician. He sat as MP for Shaftesbury from 1689 till 3 May 1715 and 19 May 1715 till his death on 20 April 1726.

He is the first son of Sir John Nicholas and Lady Penelope, the daughter of Spencer Compton, 2nd Earl of Northampton. He is the brother of William Nicholas. He was educated at New College, Oxford and matriculated in 1679. He travelled abroad in 1682 and was matriculated at Padua University in 1685. He married Rachel (died 1741), the daughter of Thomas Wyndham and sister of Hopton Wyndham. He died childless.
