= List of MPs elected in the 1713 British general election =

1713–1715 Parliament of Great Britain
←	1710–1713 Parliament	1715–1722 Parliament	→

Overview
- Legislative body: Parliament of Great Britain
- Meeting place: Palace of Westminster
- Term: 16 February 1714 – 15 January 1715
- Election: 1713 British general election
- Government: Harley ministry (until October 1714); Townshend ministry (From October 1714)

House of Commons
- Members: 558
- Speaker: Sir Thomas Hanmer
- Chief minister: Robert Harley (until October 1714); Charles Townshend, 2nd Viscount Townshend (from October 1714)

House of Lords
- Lord Chancellor: Viscount Harcourt (until 21 September 1714); William Cowper, 1st Earl Cowper (from 21 September 1714)

Crown-in-Parliament Anne

Sessions
- 1st: 16 February 1714 – 9 July 1714
- 2nd: 1 August 1714 – 25 August 1714

This is a list of the 558 MPs or members of Parliament elected to the 314 constituencies of the Parliament of Great Britain in 1713, the 4th Parliament of Great Britain and their replacements returned at subsequent by-elections, arranged by constituency.

Elections took place between 22 August – 12 November 1713, the parliament was summoned on 18 August 1713 and assembled on 12 November 1713 but prorogued until 16 February 1714.

Table of contents:

A B C D E F G H I J K L M N O P Q R S T U V W X Y Z By-elections Changes

== A ==
Aberdeen Burghs (seat 1/1)	John Middleton	Whig
Aberdeenshire (seat 1/1)	Sir Alexander Cumming	Tory
Abingdon (seat 1/1)	Simon Harcourt	Tory
Aldborough (seat 1/2)	John Dawnay	Tory
Aldborough (seat 2/2)	Paul Foley	Tory
Aldeburgh (seat 1/2)	Sir Henry Johnson	Tory
Aldeburgh (seat 2/2)	William Johnson	Tory
Amersham (seat 1/2)	Montague Garrard Drake	Tory
Amersham (seat 2/2)	The Viscount Fermanagh - sat for Buckinghamshire; Replaced by James Herbert 1714	Tory; Tory
Andover (seat 1/2)	Sir Ambrose Crowley - died Replaced by Gilbert Searle 1714	Tory Tory
Andover (seat 2/2)	William Guidott	Whig
Anglesey (seat 1/1)	The 4th Viscount Bulkeley	Tory
Anstruther Easter Burghs (seat 1/1)	Sir John Anstruther, 1st Bt	Whig
Appleby (seat 1/2)	Thomas Lutwyche	Tory
Appleby (seat 2/2)	Sir Richard Sandford, Bt.	Whig
Argyllshire (seat 1/1)	Sir James Campbell	Whig
Arundel (seat 1/2)	Viscount Lumley	Whig
Arundel (seat 2/2)	The 8th Earl of Thomond	Whig
Ashburton (seat 1/2)	Richard Reynell	Tory
Ashburton (seat 2/2)	Roger Tuckfield	Whig
Aylesbury (seat 1/2)	Simon Harcourt	Tory
Aylesbury (seat 2/2)	John Essington	Tory
Ayr Burghs (seat 1/1)	Charles Oliphant	Whig
Ayrshire (seat 1/1)	John Montgomerie	Whig
== B ==
Banbury (seat 1/1)	Sir Jonathan Cope	Tory
Banffshire (seat 1/1)	Alexander Abercromby	Whig
Barnstaple (seat 1/2)	Nicholas Hooper	Tory
Barnstaple (seat 2/2)	Sir Arthur Chichester	Tory
Bath (seat 1/2)	Samuel Trotman	Tory
Bath (seat 2/2)	John Codrington	Tory
Beaumaris (seat 1/1)	Hon. Henry Bertie	Tory
Bedford (seat 1/2)	Samuel Rolt	Tory
Bedford (seat 2/2)	John Cater	Whig
Bedfordshire (seat 1/2)	Sir Pynsent Chernock, 3rd Bt	Tory
Bedfordshire (seat 2/2)	John Harvey	Tory
Bere Alston (seat 1/2)	Lawrence Carter	Whig
Bere Alston (seat 2/2)	Sir Peter King	Whig
Berkshire (seat 1/2)	Sir John Stonhouse, Bt	Tory
Berkshire (seat 2/2)	Robert Packer	Tory
Berwickshire (seat 1/1)	George Baillie	Whig
Berwick-upon-Tweed (seat 1/2)	Richard Hampden	Whig
Berwick-upon-Tweed (seat 2/2)	William Orde	Tory
Beverley (seat 1/2)	Sir Charles Hotham, Bt	Whig
Beverley (seat 2/2)	Sir Michael Warton	Whig
Bewdley (seat 1/1)	Salwey Winnington	Tory
Bishop's Castle (seat 1/2)	Richard Harnage	Whig
Bishop's Castle (seat 2/2)	Robert Raymond	Tory
Bletchingley (seat 1/2)	George Evelyn	Whig
Bletchingley (seat 2/2)	Thomas Onslow	Whig
Bodmin (seat 1/2)	Hon. Francis Robartes	?
Bodmin (seat 2/2)	Thomas Sclater	Tory
Boroughbridge (seat 1/2)	Sir Brian Stapylton, Bt	Tory
Boroughbridge (seat 2/2)	Edmund Dunch	Whig
Bossiney (seat 1/2)	Sir William Pole	Tory
Bossiney (seat 2/2)	John Manley - died Replaced by Paul Orchard 1714	Tory ?
Boston (seat 1/2)	Henry Heron	Tory
Boston (seat 2/2)	Richard Wynn	Tory
Brackley (seat 1/2)	Hon. William Egerton – unseated on petition Replaced by John Burgh 1714	Whig Tory
Brackley (seat 2/2)	Paul Methuen – unseated on petition Replaced by Henry Watkins	Whig Tory
Bramber (seat 1/2)	The Lord Hawley	Tory
Bramber (seat 2/2)	Hon. Andrews Windsor	Tory
Brecon (seat 1/1)	Roger Jones	Tory
Breconshire (seat 1/1)	Sir Edward Williams	Tory
Bridgnorth (seat 1/2)	William Whitmore	Whig
Bridgnorth (seat 2/2)	John Weaver	Whig
Bridgwater (seat 1/2)	John Rolle	Tory
Bridgwater (seat 2/2)	Nathaniel Palmer	Tory
Bridport (seat 1/2)	John Hoskins Gifford	Tory
Bridport (seat 2/2)	William Coventry	Whig
Bristol (seat 1/2)	Thomas Edwards	Tory
Bristol (seat 2/2)	Joseph Earle	Whig
Buckingham (seat 1/2)	John Radcliffe	Tory
Buckingham (seat 2/2)	Thomas Chapman	Tory
Buckinghamshire (seat 1/2)	John Fleetwood	Tory
Buckinghamshire (seat 2/2)	The 1st Viscount Fermanagh	Tory
Bury St Edmunds (seat 1/2)	Aubrey Porter	Whig
Bury St Edmunds (seat 2/2)	Lord Hervey	Whig
Buteshire (seat 1/1)	John Campbell	Whig
== C ==
Caernarvon Boroughs (seat 1/1)	Sir Thomas Wynn, Bt	Whig
Caernarvonshire (seat 1/1)	William Griffith	Whig
Caithness (seat 0/0)	Alternating seat with Buteshire -unrepresented in this Parliament	
Callington (seat 1/2)	Samuel Rolle	Tory
Callington (seat 2/2)	Sir John Coryton	Tory
Calne (seat 1/2)	William Northey	Tory
Calne (seat 2/2)	William Hedges	Tory
Cambridge (seat 1/2)	John Hynde Cotton	Tory
Cambridge (seat 2/2)	Samuel Shepheard	Tory
Cambridgeshire (seat 1/2)	John Bromley	Tory
Cambridgeshire (seat 2/2)	John Jenyns	Tory
Cambridge University (seat 1/2)	Hon. Dixie Windsor	Tory
Cambridge University (seat 2/2)	Thomas Paske	Tory
Camelford (seat 1/2)	Sir Bourchier Wrey	Tory
Camelford (seat 2/2)	James Nicholls	Tory
Canterbury (seat 1/2)	John Hardres	Tory
Canterbury (seat 2/2)	Henry Lee	Tory
Cardiff Boroughs (seat 1/1)	Sir Edward Stradling, Bt	Tory
Cardigan Boroughs (seat 1/1)	Sir George Barlow, 2nd Baronet	Tory
Cardiganshire (seat 1/1)	Thomas Johnes	Whig
Carlisle (seat 1/2)	Sir Christopher Musgrave, Bt	Tory
Carlisle (seat 2/2)	Thomas Stanwix	Whig
Carmarthen (seat 1/1)	Richard Vaughan	Whig
Carmarthenshire (seat 1/1)	Sir Thomas Powell, Bt	Tory
Castle Rising (seat 1/2)	Hon. William Feilding	Whig
Castle Rising (seat 2/2)	Horatio Walpole, junior	Whig
Cheshire (seat 1/2)	Sir George Warburton, Bt	Tory
Cheshire (seat 2/2)	Charles Cholmondeley	Tory
Chester (seat 1/2)	Sir Henry Bunbury, Bt	Tory
Chester (seat 2/2)	Peter Shakerley	Tory
Chichester (seat 1/2)	William Elson	Tory
Chichester (seat 2/2)	James Brudenell	Whig
Chippenham (seat 1/2)	Sir John Eyles	Whig
Chippenham (seat 2/2)	John Norris	Tory
Chipping Wycombe (seat 1/2)	Sir Thomas Lee, Bt	Whig
Chipping Wycombe (seat 2/2)	Sir John Wittewrong, Bt	Whig
Christchurch (seat 1/2)	Peter Mews	Tory
Christchurch (seat 2/2)	William Ettrick	Tory
Cirencester (seat 1/2)	Thomas Master	Tory
Cirencester (seat 2/2)	Benjamin Bathurst	Tory
City of Durham (seat 1/2)	Thomas Conyers	Tory
City of Durham (seat 2/2)	George Baker	Tory
City of London (seat 1/4)	Sir William Withers	Tory
City of London (seat 2/4)	Sir Richard Hoare	Tory
City of London (seat 3/4)	Sir George Newland	Tory
City of London (seat 4/4)	Sir John Cass	Tory
Clackmannanshire (seat 1/1)	Sir John Erskine, 3rd Baronet	Whig
Clitheroe (seat 1/2)	Thomas Lister	Tory
Clitheroe (seat 2/2)	Charles Zedenno Stanley	Whig
Cockermouth (seat 1/2)	Nicholas Lechmere	Whig
Cockermouth (seat 2/2)	Joseph Musgrave	Tory
Colchester (seat 1/2)	Sir Thomas Webster, Bt – unseated on petition Replaced by William Gore	Whig Tory
Colchester (seat 2/2)	Sir Isaac Rebow – unseated on petition Replaced by Nicholas Corsellis	Whig Tory
Corfe Castle (seat 1/2)	Richard Fownes	Tory
Corfe Castle (seat 2/2)	John Bankes	Tory
Cornwall (seat 1/2)	Sir William Carew, Bt	Tory
Cornwall (seat 2/2)	John Trevanion	Tory
County Durham (seat 1/2)	Sir John Eden	Tory
County Durham (seat 2/2)	John Hedworth	Independent Whig
Coventry (seat 1/2)	Sir Christopher Hales 24 April 1711	Tory
Coventry (seat 2/2)	Sir Fulwar Skipwith, Bt	Tory
Cricklade (seat 1/2)	Sir Thomas Reade	Whig
Cricklade (seat 2/2)	William Gore - sat for Colchester; Replaced by Samuel Robinson 1714	Tory Tory
Cromartyshire (seat 0/0)	Alternating seat with Nairnshire - unrepresented in this Parliament	
Cumberland (seat 1/2)	James Lowther	Whig
Cumberland (seat 2/2)	Gilfrid Lawson	Tory
== D ==
Dartmouth (seat 1/2)	Sir William Drake	Tory
Dartmouth (seat 2/2)	Frederick Herne; Replaced by John Fownes 1714	Tory Tory
Denbigh Boroughs (seat 1/1)	John Wynne	?
Denbighshire (seat 1/1)	Sir Richard Myddelton, Bt	Tory
Derby (seat 1/2)	Edward Mundy	Tory
Derby (seat 2/2)	Nathaniel Curzon	Whig
Derbyshire (seat 1/2)	Godfrey Clarke	Tory
Derbyshire (seat 2/2)	John Curzon	Tory
Devizes (seat 1/2)	Robert Child	Tory
Devizes (seat 2/2)	John Nicholas	Tory
Devon (seat 1/2)	Sir William Courtenay	Tory
Devon (seat 2/2)	Sir Coplestone Bampfylde, Bt	Tory
Dorchester (seat 1/2)	Nathaniel Napier	Tory
Dorchester (seat 2/2)	Henry Trenchard	Tory
Dorset (seat 1/2)	George Chafin	Tory
Dorset (seat 2/2)	Thomas Strangways	Tory
Dover (seat 1/2)	Sir William Hardres, Bt	Tory
Dover (seat 2/2)	Philip Papillon	Whig
Downton (seat 1/2)	John Sawyer	Tory
Downton (seat 2/2)	John Eyre	Whig
Droitwich (seat 1/2)	Richard Foley	Tory
Droitwich (seat 2/2)	Edward Jeffreys	Tory
Dumfries Burghs (seat 1/1)	Sir William Johnstone	?
Dumfriesshire (seat 1/1)	Sir William Johnstone	?
Dunbartonshire (seat 1/1)	Hon. John Campbell	Whig
Dunwich (seat 1/2)	Sir George Downing, Bt	Whig
Dunwich (seat 2/2)	Sir Robert Kemp, Bt	Tory
Dysart Burghs (seat 1/1)	James Oswald	Tory
== E ==
East Grinstead (seat 1/2)	John Conyers	Tory
East Grinstead (seat 2/2)	Hon. Spencer Compton	Whig
East Looe (seat 1/2)	Sir Charles Hedges	Tory
East Looe (seat 2/2)	Edward Jennings	Tory
East Retford (seat 1/2)	Francis Lewis	Tory
East Retford (seat 2/2)	John Digby	Tory
Edinburgh (seat 1/1)	Sir James Stewart	Whig
Edinburghshire (seat 1/1)	George Lockhart	Tory
Elgin Burghs (seat 1/1)	James Murray	Tory
Elginshire (seat 1/1)	Alexander Grant	Whig
Essex (seat 1/2)	Sir Charles Barrington	Tory
Essex (seat 2/2)	Richard Child	Tory
Evesham (seat 1/2)	Sir Edward Goodere	Tory
Evesham (seat 2/2)	John Rudge	Whig
Exeter (seat 1/2)	John Rolle	Tory
Exeter (seat 2/2)	Francis Drewe	Tory
Eye (seat 1/2)	Edward Hopkins	Whig
Eye (seat 2/2)	Thomas Maynard	Whig
== F ==
Fife (seat 1/1)	Sir Alexander Erskine	Tory
Flint Boroughs (seat 1/1)	Sir Roger Mostyn	Tory
Flintshire (seat 1/1)	Sir John Conway	Tory
Forfarshire (seat 1/1)	John Carnegie	Tory
Fowey (seat 1/2)	Jermyn Wyche	Tory
Fowey (seat 2/2)	Henry Vincent	Tory
== G ==
Gatton (seat 1/2)	William Newland	Tory
Gatton (seat 2/2)	Paul Docminique	Tory
Glamorganshire (seat 1/1)	Robert Jones	Tory
Glasgow Burghs (seat 1/1)	Thomas Smith	Whig
Gloucester (seat 1/2)	John Snell	Tory
Gloucester (seat 2/2)	Charles Coxe	Tory
Gloucestershire (seat 1/2)	Thomas Stephens II	Whig
Gloucestershire (seat 2/2)	John Symes Berkeley	Tory
Grampound (seat 1/2)	Andrew Quick	Tory
Grampound (seat 2/2)	Thomas Coke	Tory
Grantham (seat 1/2)	Sir John Thorold	Whig
Grantham (seat 2/2)	Sir John Brownlow	Whig
Great Bedwyn (seat 1/2)	Thomas Millington	Tory
Great Bedwyn (seat 2/2)	Sir Edward Seymour, Bt.	Tory
Great Grimsby (seat 1/2)	Arthur Moore	Tory
Great Grimsby (seat 2/2)	William Cotesworth	Whig
Great Marlow (seat 1/2)	Sir James Etheridge	Tory
Great Marlow (seat 2/2)	George Bruere	Tory
Great Yarmouth (seat 1/2)	George England	Tory
Great Yarmouth (seat 2/2)	Richard Ferrier	Tory
Guildford (seat 1/2)	Sir Richard Onslow - sat for Surrey; Replaced by Denzil Onslow	Whig; Whig
Guildford (seat 2/2)	Morgan Randyll	Tory
== H ==
Haddington Burghs (seat 1/1)	Hon. Sir David Dalrymple	Whig
Haddingtonshire (seat 1/1)	John Cockburn	Whig
Hampshire (seat 1/2)	Thomas Lewis	Tory
Hampshire (seat 2/2)	Sir Anthony Sturt	Tory
Harwich (seat 1/2)	Carew Hervey Mildmay	Tory
Harwich (seat 2/2)	Thomas Davall - died Replaced by Thomas Heath 1714 – result reversed Replaced by Benedict Calvert 1714	Tory Tory Tory
Haslemere (seat 1/2)	Thomas Onslow - sat for Bletchingley; Replaced by Nicholas Carew 1714	Whig Whig
Haslemere (seat 2/2)	George Vernon	Tory
Hastings (seat 1/2)	Archibald Hutcheson	Independent
Hastings (seat 2/2)	Sir Joseph Martin	Tory
Haverfordwest (seat 1/1)	John Laugharne	Tory
Hedon (seat 1/2)	Hugh Cholmley	Whig
Hedon (seat 2/2)	William Pulteney	Whig
Helston (seat 1/2)	Henry Campion - sat for Sussex; Replaced by Thomas Tonkin 1714	Tory Tory
Helston (seat 2/2)	Charles Coxe - sat for Gloucester; Replaced by Alexander Pendarves 1714	Tory Tory
Hereford (seat 1/2)	Hon. James Brydges	Whig (Tory after 1714)
Hereford (seat 2/2)	Thomas Foley	Tory
Herefordshire (seat 1/2)	The 3rd Viscount Scudamore	Tory
Herefordshire (seat 2/2)	Sir Thomas Morgan	Tory
Hertford (seat 1/2)	Charles Caesar	Tory
Hertford (seat 2/2)	Richard Goulston	Tory
Hertfordshire (seat 1/2)	Ralph Freman	Tory
Hertfordshire (seat 2/2)	Thomas Halsey	Tory
Heytesbury (seat 1/2)	Edward Ashe	Whig
Heytesbury (seat 2/2)	Pierce A'Court	Whig
Higham Ferrers (seat 1/1)	Hon. Thomas Watson-Wentworth - sat for Malton; Replaced by Charles Leigh 1714	Whig Tory
Hindon (seat 1/2)	Reynolds Calthorpe, the younger	Whig
Hindon (seat 2/2)	Richard Lockwood	Tory
Honiton (seat 1/2)	Sir William Drake	Tory
Honiton (seat 2/2)	James Sheppard	Tory
Horsham (seat 1/2)	John Middleton 5 December 1710	Tory
Horsham (seat 2/2)	Charles Eversfield	Tory
Huntingdon (seat 1/2)	Sidney Wortley-Montagu	Whig
Huntingdon (seat 2/2)	Viscount Hinchingbrooke	Whig
Huntingdonshire (seat 1/2)	Sir Matthew Dudley, Bt	Whig
Huntingdonshire (seat 2/2)	Robert Pigott	Whig
Hythe (seat 1/2)	Jacob des Bouverie	Tory
Hythe (seat 2/2)	John Boteler	Tory
== I ==
Ilchester (seat 1/2)	Edward Phelips	Tory
Ilchester (seat 2/2)	Sir James Bateman 25 July 1712	Tory (Whig after 1714)
Inverness Burghs (seat 1/1)	William Steuart	Whig
Inverness-shire (seat 1/1)	Alexander Mackenzie	Tory
Ipswich (seat 1/2)	William Churchill – unseated on petition Replaced by Richard Richardson 1714	Whig Tory
Ipswich (seat 2/2)	William Thompson – unseated on petition Replaced by Orlando Bridgeman 1714	Whig Tory
== K ==
Kent (seat 1/2)	Sir Edward Knatchbull, 4th Bt	Tory
Kent (seat 2/2)	Percival Hart	Tory
Kincardineshire (seat 1/1)	James Scott	Tory
King's Lynn (seat 1/2)	Sir Robert Walpole	Whig
King's Lynn (seat 2/2)	Sir Charles Turner	Whig
Kingston upon Hull (seat 1/2)	Sir William St Quintin	Tory
Kingston upon Hull (seat 2/2)	William Maister	Tory
Kinross-shire (seat 0/0)	Alternating seat with Clackmannanshire - unrepresented in this Parliament	
Kirkcudbright Stewartry (seat 1/1)	John Stewart	Whig
Knaresborough (seat 1/2)	Christopher Stockdale - died Replaced by Francis Fawkes 1714	Whig Tory
Knaresborough (seat 2/2)	Robert Byerley - died Replaced by Henry Slingsby 1714	Tory Tory
== L ==
Lanarkshire (seat 1/1)	Sir James Hamilton of Rosehall	Tory
Lancashire (seat 1/2)	Sir John Bland	Tory
Lancashire (seat 2/2)	Richard Shuttleworth	Tory
Lancaster (seat 1/2)	William Heysham	Tory
Lancaster (seat 2/2)	Robert Heysham	Whig
Launceston (seat 1/2)	Edward Herle	Tory
Launceston (seat 2/2)	John Anstis	Tory
Leicester (seat 1/2)	James Winstanley	Tory
Leicester (seat 2/2)	Sir George Beaumont	Tory
Leicestershire (seat 1/2)	Viscount Tamworth; Replaced by Geoffrey Palmer 1714	Tory; Tory
Leicestershire (seat 2/2)	Sir Thomas Cave	Tory
Leominster (seat 1/2)	Henry Gorges	Tory
Leominster (seat 2/2)	Edward Harley	Tory
Lewes (seat 1/2)	Thomas Pelham	Whig
Lewes (seat 2/2)	John Morley Trevor	Whig
Lichfield (seat 1/2)	John Cotes	Tory
Lichfield (seat 2/2)	Richard Dyott	Tory
Lincoln (seat 1/2)	Thomas Lister	Tory
Lincoln (seat 2/2)	John Sibthorpe	Tory
Lincolnshire (seat 1/2)	Willoughby Hickman	Tory
Lincolnshire (seat 2/2)	Lord Willoughby d'Eresby	Tory
Linlithgow Burghs (seat 1/1)	Sir James Carmichael, Bt	Whig
Linlithgowshire (seat 1/1)	Sir James Carmichael, Bt – sat for Linlithgow Burgs; Replaced by John Houston	Whig Tory
Liskeard (seat 1/2)	Philip Rashleigh	Tory
Liskeard (seat 2/2)	William Bridges	Tory
Liverpool (seat 1/2)	Sir Thomas Johnson	Whig
Liverpool (seat 2/2)	William Clayton	Tory
Lostwithiel (seat 1/2)	Sir Thomas Clarges	Tory
Lostwithiel (seat 2/2)	Erasmus Lewis	Tory
Ludgershall (seat 1/2)	John Richmond Webb - sat for Newport (IOW); Replaced by John Ward 1714	Tory; Tory
Ludgershall (seat 2/2)	Robert Ferne	Tory
Ludlow (seat 1/2)	Humphrey Walcot	?
Ludlow (seat 2/2)	Acton Baldwyn	Tory
Lyme Regis (seat 1/2)	Henry Henley	?
Lyme Regis (seat 2/2)	John Burridge	Whig
Lymington (seat 1/2)	Lord William Powlett	Whig
Lymington (seat 2/2)	Sir Joseph Jekyll	Whig
== M ==
Maidstone (seat 1/2)	Sir Samuel Ongley	Tory
Maidstone (seat 2/2)	Sir Robert Marsham	Whig
Maldon (seat 1/2)	John Comyns	Tory
Maldon (seat 2/2)	Thomas Bramston	Whig
Malmesbury (seat 1/2)	Sir John Rushout	Whig
Malmesbury (seat 2/2)	Joseph Addison	Whig
Malton (seat 1/2)	Thomas Watson Wentworth	Whig
Malton (seat 2/2)	William Strickland	Whig
Marlborough (seat 1/2)	Gabriel Roberts	Tory
Marlborough (seat 2/2)	Hon. Robert Bruce	Tory
Merionethshire (seat 1/1)	Richard Vaughan	Tory
Middlesex (seat 1/2)	Hon. James Bertie	Tory
Middlesex (seat 2/2)	Hugh Smithson	Tory
Midhurst (seat 1/2)	William Woodward Knight	Tory
Midhurst (seat 2/2)	John Pratt	Whig
Milborne Port (seat 1/2)	Sir Thomas Travell	Whig
Milborne Port (seat 2/2)	James Medlycott	Whig
Minehead (seat 1/2)	Sir Jacob Bancks	Tory
Minehead (seat 2/2)	Sir John Trevelyan	Tory
Mitchell (seat 1/2)	Sir Henry Belasyse	Tory
Mitchell (seat 2/2)	John Statham	Tory
Monmouth Boroughs (seat 1/1)	Clayton Milborne	Tory
Monmouthshire (seat 1/2)	Sir Charles Kemeys, Bt	Tory
Monmouthshire (seat 2/2)	John Morgan	Whig
Montgomery (seat 1/1)	John Pugh	Tory
Montgomeryshire (seat 1/1)	Edward Vaughan	Tory
Morpeth (seat 1/2)	Sir John Germain	Whig
Morpeth (seat 2/2)	Oley Douglas	Whig
== N ==
Nairnshire (seat 1/1)	John Forbes	Whig
Newark (seat 1/2)	Richard Sutton	Whig
Newark (seat 2/2)	Richard Newdigate	Tory
Newcastle-under-Lyme (seat 1/2)	William Burslem	Tory
Newcastle-under-Lyme (seat 2/2)	Rowland Cotton	Tory
Newcastle-upon-Tyne (seat 1/2)	Sir William Blackett, Bt.	Tory
Newcastle-upon-Tyne (seat 2/2)	William Wrightson	Tory
Newport (Cornwall) (seat 1/2)	Sir Nicholas Morice	Tory
Newport (Cornwall) (seat 2/2)	Humphry Morice	Whig
Newport (Isle of Wight) (seat 1/2)	John Richmond Webb	Tory
Newport (Isle of Wight) (seat 2/2)	William Stephens	Tory
New Radnor Boroughs (seat 1/1)	Lord Harley	Tory
New Romney (seat 2/2)	Robert Furnese	Whig
New Romney (seat 1/2)	Edward Watson	Whig
New Shoreham (seat 1/2)	Francis Chamberlayne	Whig
New Shoreham (seat 2/2)	Nathaniel Gould	Whig
Newton (Lancashire) (seat 2/2)	John Ward	Tory
Newton (Lancashire) (seat 1/2)	Abraham Blackmore	Tory
Newtown (Isle of Wight) (seat 1/2)	Sir James Worsley	Tory
Newtown (Isle of Wight) (seat 2/2)	Henry Worsley	Tory
New Windsor (seat 1/2)	Charles Aldworth	Tory
New Windsor (seat 2/2)	Christopher Wren	Tory
New Woodstock (seat 2/2)	William Cadogan	Whig
New Woodstock (seat 1/2)	Sir Thomas Wheate	Whig
Norfolk (seat 1/2)	Sir Edmund Bacon, Bt	Tory
Norfolk (seat 2/2)	Sir Jacob Astley, Bt.	Whig
Northallerton (seat 1/2)	Leonard Smelt	Whig
Northallerton (seat 2/2)	Henry Peirse	Whig
Northampton (seat 1/2)	George Montagu	Whig
Northampton (seat 2/2)	William Wykes	Tory
Northamptonshire (seat 1/2)	Sir Justinian Isham	Tory
Northamptonshire (seat 2/2)	Thomas Cartwright	Tory
Northumberland (seat 1/2)	Thomas Forster	Tory
Northumberland (seat 2/2)	Earl of Hertford	Whig
Norwich (seat 1/2)	Robert Bene	Tory
Norwich (seat 2/2)	Richard Berney	Tory
Nottingham (seat 1/2)	Borlase Warren	Tory
Nottingham (seat 2/2)	Robert Sacheverell	Tory
Nottinghamshire (seat 1/2)	Hon. Francis Willoughby	Tory
Nottinghamshire (seat 2/2)	William Levinz	Tory
== O ==
Okehampton (seat 1/2)	William Northmore	Tory
Okehampton (seat 2/2)	Christopher Harris	Tory
Old Sarum (seat 1/2)	Thomas Pitt	Tory
Old Sarum (seat 2/2)	Robert Pitt	Tory
Orford (seat 1/2)	Clement Corrance	Tory
Orford (seat 2/2)	Sir Edward Turnor	Tory
Orkney and Shetland (seat 1/1)	George Douglas	Whig
Oxford (seat 1/2)	Thomas Rowney	Tory
Oxford (seat 2/2)	Sir John Walter	Tory
Oxfordshire (seat 1/2)	Sir Robert Jenkinson	Tory
Oxfordshire (seat 2/2)	Francis Clerke	Tory
Oxford University (seat 1/2)	Sir William Whitelock	Tory
Oxford University (seat 2/2)	Wiliam Bromley	Tory
== P ==
Peeblesshire (seat 1/1)	William Morison	Whig
Pembroke Boroughs (seat 1/1)	Lewis Wogan	Tory
Pembrokeshire (seat 1/1)	John Barlow	Tory
Penryn (seat 1/2)	Alexander Pendarves; Replaced by Samuel Trefusis 1714	Tory; Whig
Penryn (seat 2/2)	Hugh Boscawen	Whig
Perth Burghs (seat 1/1)	George Yeaman	Tory
Perthshire (seat 1/1)	Lord James Murray	Tory
Peterborough (seat 1/2)	Viscount Milton	Whig
Peterborough (seat 2/2)	Charles Parker	Tory
Petersfield (seat 1/2)	Norton Powlett	Whig
Petersfield (seat 2/2)	Leonard Bilson	Tory
Plymouth (seat 1/2)	Sir John Rogers	Whig
Plymouth (seat 2/2)	Sir George Byng	Whig
Plympton Erle (seat 1/2)	Richard Edgcumbe	Whig
Plympton Erle (seat 2/2)	George Treby	Whig
Pontefract (seat 1/2)	John Dawnay	Tory
Pontefract (seat 2/2)	Robert Frank	Tory
Poole (seat 1/2)	George Trenchard	Whig
Poole (seat 2/2)	William Lewen	Tory
Portsmouth (seat 1/2)	Sir James Wishart	Tory
Portsmouth (seat 2/2)	Sir Thomas Mackworth, Bt	Tory
Preston (seat 1/2)	Henry Fleetwood	Tory
Preston (seat 2/2)	Edward Southwell	Tory
== Q ==
Queenborough (seat 1/2)	Colonel Thomas King	Whig
Queenborough (seat 2/2)	Charles Fotherby	Tory
== R ==
Radnorshire (seat 1/1)	Thomas Harley	Tory
Reading (seat 1/2)	Robert Clarges	Tory
Reading (seat 2/2)	Felix Calvert	Tory
Reigate (seat 1/2)	James Cocks	Whig
Reigate (seat 2/2)	Sir John Parsons	Tory
Renfrewshire (seat 1/1)	Sir Robert Pollock, Bt	Whig
Richmond (Yorkshire) (seat 1/2)	Thomas Yorke	Whig
Richmond (Yorkshire) (seat 2/2)	Hon. Harry Mordaunt	Whig
Ripon (seat 1/2)	John Aislabie	Whig
Ripon (seat 2/2)	John Sharp	Tory
Rochester (seat 1/2)	Admiral Sir John Leake	Tory
Rochester (seat 2/2)	William Cage	Tory
Ross-shire (seat 1/1)	Charles Ross	Tory
Roxburghshire (seat 1/1)	Sir Gilbert Eliott	Whig
Rutland (seat 1/2)	Lord Finch	Tory
Rutland (seat 2/2)	The Lord Sherard	Whig
Rye (seat 1/2)	Phillips Gybbon	Whig
Rye (seat 2/2)	Sir John Norris	Whig
== S ==
St Albans (seat 1/2)	William Hale – unseated on petition Replaced by John Gape	Whig Tory
St Albans (seat 2/2)	William Grimston	Whig
St Germans (seat 1/2)	Edward Eliot	Tory (Whig after 1714)
St Germans (seat 2/2)	John Knight	Whig
St Ives (seat 1/2)	Sir William Pendarves	Tory
St Ives (seat 2/2)	John Hopkins	Whig
St Mawes (seat 1/2)	Edward Rolt	Tory
St Mawes (seat 2/2)	Francis Scobell	Tory
Salisbury (seat 1/2)	Charles Fox - died Replaced by Sir Stephen Fox 1714	Tory Tory
Salisbury (seat 2/2)	Richard Jones	Tory
Saltash (seat 1/2)	Jonathan Elford	Tory
Saltash (seat 2/2)	William Shippen	Tory
Sandwich (seat 1/2)	John Michel	Tory
Sandwich (seat 2/2)	Sir Henry Oxenden	Whig
Scarborough (seat 1/2)	John Hungerford	Tory
Scarborough (seat 2/2)	William Thompson	Whig
Seaford (seat 1/2)	George Naylor	Whig
Seaford (seat 2/2)	William Lowndes	Whig
Selkirkshire (seat 1/1)	John Pringle	Tory
Shaftesbury (seat 1/2)	Henry Whitaker	Tory
Shaftesbury (seat 2/2)	Edward Nicholas	Tory
Shrewsbury (seat 1/2)	Edward Cressett	Tory
Shrewsbury (seat 2/2)	Thomas Jones; Replaced by Corbet Kynaston 1714	Whig Tory
Shropshire (seat 1/2)	John Kynaston	Tory
Shropshire (seat 2/2)	Lord Newport	Whig
Somerset (seat 1/2)	Thomas Horner	Tory
Somerset (seat 2/2)	Sir William Wyndham, Bt	Tory
Southampton (seat 1/2)	Roger Harris	Tory
Southampton (seat 2/2)	Richard Fleming	Tory
Southwark (seat 1/2)	John Lade	Tory
Southwark (seat 2/2)	Fisher Tench	Whig
Stafford (seat 1/2)	Walter Chetwynd	Whig
Stafford (seat 2/2)	Henry Vernon	?
Staffordshire (seat 1/2)	Ralph Sneyd	Tory
Staffordshire (seat 2/2)	Henry Vernon	Tory
Stamford (seat 1/2)	Hon. Charles Cecil	Tory
Stamford (seat 2/2)	Hon. Charles Bertie	Tory
Steyning (seat 1/2)	Robert Leeves; Replaced by William Wallis	Tory Whig
Steyning (seat 2/2)	Sir Henry Goring, Bt	Tory
Stirling Burghs (seat 1/1)	Henry Cunningham	Whig
Stirlingshire (seat 1/1)	Sir Hugh Paterson, Bt	Tory
Stockbridge (seat 1/2)	Thomas Brodrick	Whig
Stockbridge (seat 2/2)	Richard Steele - Expelled; Replaced by The Earl of Barrymore 1714	Whig Tory
Sudbury (seat 1/2)	Sir Hervey Elwes	Whig
Sudbury (seat 2/2)	Robert Echlin	Tory
Suffolk (seat 1/2)	Sir Thomas Hanmer, Bt	Tory (Speaker)
Suffolk (seat 2/2)	Sir Robert Davers, Bt	Tory
Surrey (seat 1/2)	Hon. Heneage Finch	Tory
Surrey (seat 2/2)	Sir Richard Onslow	Whig
Sussex (seat 1/2)	Henry Campion	Tory
Sussex (seat 2/2)	John Fuller	Tory
Sutherland (seat 1/1)	William Morison - sat for Peeblesshire; Replaced by Sir William Gordon 1714	Whig Whig
== T ==
Tain Burghs (seat 1/1)	Sir Robert Munro, Bt	Whig
Tamworth (seat 1/2)	Samuel Bracebridge	Tory
Tamworth (seat 2/2)	Joseph Girdler	Tory
Taunton (seat 1/2)	Sir Francis Warre	Tory
Taunton (seat 2/2)	Henry Seymour Portman	Tory
Tavistock (seat 1/2)	Sir John Cope	Whig
Tavistock (seat 2/2)	James Bulteel	Tory
Tewkesbury (seat 1/2)	Charles Dowdeswell - died Replaced by Anthony Lechmere 1714	Tory Whig
Tewkesbury (seat 2/2)	William Dowdeswell	Whig
Thetford (seat 1/2)	Sir William Barker	Tory
Thetford (seat 2/2)	Dudley North	Tory
Thirsk (seat 2/2)	Ralph Bell	Whig
Thirsk (seat 1/2)	Thomas Frankland	Whig
Tiverton (seat 1/2)	Sir Edward Northey	Tory
Tiverton (seat 2/2)	John Worth	Tory
Totnes (seat 2/2)	Stephen Northleigh	Tory
Totnes (seat 1/2)	Francis Gwyn	Tory
Tregony (seat 1/2)	Sir Edmund Prideaux	?
Tregony (seat 2/2)	James Craggs	Whig
Truro (seat 1/2)	Thomas Hare	Tory
Truro (seat 2/2)	William Collier	Tory
== W ==
Wallingford (seat 1/2)	Richard Bigg	Tory
Wallingford (seat 2/2)	Simon Harcourt - sat for Abingdon; Replaced by Thomas Renda	Tory Tory
Wareham (seat 1/2)	George Pitt	Tory
Wareham (seat 2/2)	Thomas Erle	Whig
Warwick (seat 1/2)	William Colemore	Tory
Warwick (seat 2/2)	Hon. Dodington Greville	Tory
Warwickshire (seat 1/2)	Sir John Mordaunt	Tory
Warwickshire (seat 2/2)	Andrew Archer	Tory
Wells (seat 1/2)	Sir Thomas Wroth	Tory
Wells (seat 2/2)	Maurice Berkeley	Tory
Wendover (seat 1/2)	Richard Hampden - sat for Berwick-upon-Tweed; Replaced by James Stanhope 1714	Whig; Whig
Wendover (seat 2/2)	Sir Roger Hill	Whig
Wenlock (seat 2/2)	Sir William Forester	Whig
Wenlock (seat 1/2)	William Whitmore - sat for Bridgnorth; Replaced by Richard Newport 1714	Whig ?
Weobley (seat 1/2)	John Birch	Whig
Weobley (seat 2/2)	Uvedale Tomkins Price	Tory
West Looe (seat 1/2)	Rear Admiral Sir Charles Wager	Whig
West Looe (seat 2/2)	John Trelawny	Whig
Westbury (seat 1/2)	Hon. Henry Bertie	Tory
Westbury (seat 2/2)	Francis Annesley	Whig
Westminster (seat 1/2)	Thomas Medlycott	Tory
Westminster (seat 2/2)	Sir Thomas Crosse, Bt	Tory
Westmorland (seat 1/2)	Daniel Wilson	Whig
Westmorland (seat 2/2)	James Grahme	Tory
Weymouth and Melcombe Regis (seat 1/4)	John Baker - unseated on petition Replaced by Thomas Hardy 1714	Whig Tory
Weymouth and Melcombe Regis (seat 2/4)	Rear-Admiral James Littleton	Whig
Weymouth and Melcombe Regis (seat 3/4)	Lieutenant-General Daniel Harvey - unseated on petition Replaced by William Harvey1714	Whig; Tory
Weymouth and Melcombe Regis (seat 4/4)	William Betts - unseated on petition Replaced by Reginald Marriott 1714	Whig Tory
Whitchurch (seat 2/2)	Frederick Tylney	Tory
Whitchurch (seat 1/2)	Thomas Vernon	Tory
Wigan (seat 1/2)	Sir Roger Bradshaigh	Tory
Wigan (seat 2/2)	George Kenyon	Tory
Wigtown Burghs (seat 1/1)	Alexander Maxwell	Tory
Wigtownshire (seat 1/1)	John Stewart	Whig
Wilton (seat 1/2)	John London	Whig
Wilton (seat 2/2)	Thomas Pitt	Whig
Wiltshire (seat 1/2)	Sir Richard Howe	Tory
Wiltshire (seat 2/2)	Robert Hyde	Tory
Winchelsea (seat 1/2)	Robert Bristow II	Whig
Winchelsea (seat 2/2)	George Dodington	Whig
Winchester (seat 1/2)	George Rodney Brydges – died Replaced by George Brydges 1714	Whig Whig
Winchester (seat 2/2)	Thomas Lewis – sat for Hampshire; Replaced by John Popham 1714	Tory Tory
Wootton Bassett (seat 1/2)	Edmund Pleydell 14 December 1710	Tory
Wootton Bassett (seat 2/2)	Richard Cresswell	Tory
Worcester (seat 1/2)	Thomas Wylde	Whig
Worcester (seat 2/2)	Samuel Swift	Tory
Worcestershire (seat 1/2)	Sir John Pakington	Tory
Worcestershire (seat 2/2)	Samuel Pytts	Tory
== Y ==
Yarmouth (Isle of Wight) (seat 1/2)	Henry Holmes	Tory
Yarmouth (Isle of Wight) (seat 2/2)	Sir Gilbert Dolben, Bt	Tory
York (seat 1/2)	Sir William Robinson	Whig
York (seat 2/2)	Robert Fairfax	Tory
Yorkshire (seat 1/2)	The 2nd Viscount Downe	Tory
Yorkshire (seat 2/2)	Sir Arthur Kaye, Bt	Tory

== By-elections ==
- List of Great Britain by-elections (1707–15)

== See also ==
- 1713 British general election
- 4th Parliament of Great Britain
- List of parliaments of Great Britain
- Unreformed House of Commons
