= George Hamilton (MP for Wells) =

British politician

The Honourable George Hamilton (c. 1697 – 3 May 1775) was an Anglo-Irish politician and courtier, the second son of James Hamilton, 6th Earl of Abercorn.

== Career ==
George Hamilton first stood for British parliament in Wells as an opposition Whig in the 1722 British general election, but was not elected and his petition to the House of Commons to overturn the result was not granted.

While he did not stand for Wells in the 1727 British general election, he was elected Member of Parliament for St Johnstown in the Irish House of Commons that same year. This was a parliament that lasted the entire reign of King George II until 1761, in which it was common for members to be relatively non-participant. The voters of the riding of St Johnstown were thirteen non-resident landholders who generally cast their votes according to the direction of the plantation borough corporation, which was in the control of the Earl of Abercorn and on the council of which George sat.

Also in 1727, he was commissioned into Colonel Stanhope Cotton's Regiment, later the 13th Regiment of Foot, as an Ensign on 2 February under Lord Mark Kerr's colonelcy. He joined the regiment in Gibraltar amidst the Siege of Gibraltar, serving there until the regiment's return to England. He likely remained with the regiment during its subsequent postings to Worcester, Windsor and Bristol, cashing his commission prior to its deployment to Edinburgh in 1731.

He was duly elected for Wells in the 1734 election, but the result was overturned on petition by the court party Whig George Speke in a highly political proceeding that George blamed on Prime Minister Robert Walpole. Of that petition, Edward Harley noted Walpole's ministry "summoned their whole force and all their troops, being resolved to carry their Members though they had lost that city." Speke was seated in his place on 25 March 1735.

On 6 July 1742, George was appointed Deputy-Cofferer in the household of Frederick, Prince of Wales, his sister Jane, Lady Archibald Hamilton, having been the prince’s mistress from 1736 to 1745 and his brother Charles Hamilton, famous builder of Painshill Park, having been Clerk of the Household from 1738 to 1747.

George was elected again for Wells in the general election of 1747, and though another petition against the result was commenced the proceeding was allowed to expire upon prorogation of the Commons. Henry Bathurst remarked to John Cust, both then fellow MPs and colleagues at Leicester House, "Pray tell Mr. Hamilton that I congratulate him on his reprieve, which I hope the mercy of the ministry will hereafter extend into a pardon."

George served in his Household role until the prince’s premature death on 20 March 1751, and did not subsequently stand for re-election at Wells in the 1754 general election. The Hamiltons of Abercorn had lost control of the St Johnstown corporation by the 1750s and he did not stand in the 1761 Irish election.

== Personal life ==
In October 1719, he married Bridget, the daughter of Colonel William Coward who was himself a five-time MP for Wells. Coward was said to be a successful merchant in the Virginia trade from whom George inherited a substantial estate in Somerset, and a descendant of Edward Seymour, Lord Protector of England.

George made his country home in Wells at 11 Chamberlain Street, the manor inherited from his father-in-law, for much of his adult life. He retired nearby to Bath, his will expressing some likely political disaffection with Wells: "I will on no account be buried at Wells or have any achievement at either the parish church or cathedral church in the said city."

At Bath he was one of the original residents of the Royal Crescent and was said to be celebrated for his love of planting. He and his wife died within four months of each other.

== Family ==
With Bridget, George had eleven legitimate children:

- Elizabeth (Hamilton) Cameron/de Fay (born 13 November 1720 in the City of Westminster, London) married John Cameron, a nephew of Lord Cameron of Lochiel, who rose to the rank of colonel in the service of the French Royal Army. Following his death, she remarried to a French nobleman, Comte de Fay from Amiens, where they lived until her death some years following the French Revolution.
- Captain George Hamilton Esq., RN (28 September 1721 in Wells, Somerset to 18 April 1760 in Halifax, Nova Scotia) was a Royal Navy officer who first passed for Lieutenant on 16 July 1741. He served mainly onboard the 90-gun second-rate ship of the line HMS Duke until he was appointed to command the 10-gun sloop of war HMS Mediator upon its purchase by the Royal Navy. The ship was surrendered to the French privateer Naïade on the first day of a mission carrying dispatches during the War of Austrian Succession. Unlike the master of the vessel, Hamilton was spared court martial but was reverted in rank to midshipman. He was re-promoted to Lieutenant a year later on 25 October 1746 and was promoted Commander in command the 16-gun sloop HMS Porcupine on 21 August 1758. Upon arrival in the North America station the following month, he took command of the sixth-rate 20-gun HMS Squirrel, which played a key role at the Battle of the Plains of Abraham a year later. He was made Post-captain and took command of the new fifth-rate 32-gun HMS Richmond a week after the battle on 22 September 1759.
- Bridget (Hamilton) Finney (2 January 1723 in Wells, Somerset to 3 April 1789 in Alston, Knightsbridge), married the Reverend Thomas Finney on 7 Jan 1760 in Tiverton, Devon, England. Thomas took his Bachelor of Arts from Peterhouse, Cambridge and was ordained at St Margaret's, Westminster in 1755, though did not subsequently hold a church appointment.
- Maria (Hamilton) Marsh/Beckford (7 January 1725 at Wells, Somerset to 22 July 1798 at Westend, Hampstead) married Francis Marsh on 17 August 1747 in Westminster, with whom she had a daughter Elizabeth. Following Marsh's death, she married the wealthy Jamaican sugar plantation magnate and politician William Beckford on 8 June 1756, who served as Lord Mayor of London and MP for the City of London. They had a son, the romantic novelist and builder William Beckford, who through his two parents was a descendant of every baron signatory to Magna Carta, and two daughters, one of whom - Susan Euphemia - married Alexander Hamilton, 10th Duke of Hamilton. She is buried at Fonthill Gifford in Wiltshire.
- The Venerable John Hamilton (22 April 1726 at Wells, Somerset to 12 August 1756 at Merrion Street, Dublin) studied at University College, Oxford, graduating in 1747. He was called to the priesthood, serving as curate at St Cuthbert's Church, Wells in 1748 before being appointed a prebendary of Wells Cathedral in 1750. In 1754 he was collated as Archdeacon of Raphoe in the Diocese of Raphoe near the Abercorn estates in Ulster.
- Colonel William Hamilton Esq. (10 September 1727 at Wells, Somerset to 11 July 1793 at Westminster), who was said to be at the time of his death "one of the oldest officers in His Majesty's service." He was commissioned into the 56th Regiment of Foot, which was shortly thereafter reranked as the 54th Regiment of Foot, when it was first raised at the outbreak of the Seven Years War in late 1755. He served with his regiment throughout the war in Gibraltar, cashing his commission some time in 1764. With the escalation of the American Revolutionary War, he joined the newly-formed 85th Regiment of Foot (Westminster Volunteers) at its formation in 1778 but transferred later that year to the 2nd Regiment of Foot. Shortly thereafter, he was simultaneously promoted to Major and then Lieutenant Colonel in a non-regimental appointment. This appointment to army staff appears to coincide with the promotion of John Campbell, 5th Duke of Argyll, who had raised William's first regiment in 1755, to General. He was subsequently promoted to Colonel on 26 November 1782 and appears to have sold his commission in the 2nd Foot effective 25 May 1787, but to have continued to serve in some non-regimental capacity until his death. His will indicates no wife or children, leaving his estate to the family of a close acquaintance of his at the Whitehall pay office.
- Captain James Hamilton Esq. (9 January 1729 at Wells, Somerset to 1779 or 1797 in Silverhill, Magheraboy, County Fermanagh), who was appointed to the Household of the Prince of Wales, where his father and uncle also held appointments, on 15 February 1747. He nominally held a civil list position as a page of honour but appears actually have been employed as the Household equerry until the prince's demise in 1751. On 30 August 1755, he was commissioned as a Captain into a new battalion of the 34th Regiment of Foot being raised by the Earl of Effingham, who had recently become his brother-in-law through his sister Maria's remarriage to William Beckford. This new battalion merged with the returning survivors of the 1st battalion who had suffered the loss of the Siege of Menorca, and was employed in marine coastal raiding through much of the Seven Years' War. James participated in the Battle of St Cast and cashed his commission in January 1762 following the peace with France prior to the regiment sailing for Havana. He married twice.
- Harriot (Hamilton) Peter (18 September 1730 at Wells, Somerset to 1787), who married the Rev. William Peter and bore children Edward, Harriot, Elizabeth and Arthur. Following his graduation from Balliol College, Oxford in 1755, William served as rector of St Mawnan and St Stephen's Church, Mawnan in Cornwall. In 1758 he became chaplain to Harriot's cousin, James Hamilton, 8th Earl of Abercorn, serving in this role until his appointment as a prebendary of Wells Cathedral in 1763 where he served until his death in 1799.
- Frances (Hamilton) Tooker (4 September 1732 in Wells, Somerset to 1752), who married James Tooker, Esq. of Chilcompton, Somerset on 15 October 1751 in Dinder, near Wells. James was related to the Tooker baronets of Maddington and was a barrister of Middle Temple who was well regarded by the Hamilton family and remained close to them following Frances' death. Frances and James made their home at Norton House in Midsomer Norton, the site of the later Norton Hall. He was appointed a joint executor of the estate of Frances' mother Bridget.
- Charlotte Hamilton (10 April 1734 in Bath, Somerset to 3 February 1778 in Loughton, Essex), who being a spinster of frail health lived with her sister Maria and her second husband William Beckford.
- Rachel (Hamilton) Walter (8 October 1736 in Westminster to 29 April 1812 in Norwich), who married the Rev. Nevill Walter, grandson of George Nevill, 13th Baron Bergavenny by his daughter Jane. Rachel and Nevill made their home at Bergh Apton, Norfolk where he was rector of the church of which his cousin, George Nevill, 1st Earl of Abergavenny, was patron. They had a daughter, Jane, born 6 December 1770.

Parliament of Ireland
Preceded by Hon. Henry Hamilton; William Forward	Member of Parliament for St Johnstown (County Donegal); 1727–1761; With: William Forward	Succeeded by Ralph Howard; William Forward
Parliament of Great Britain
Preceded by Thomas Edwards; William Piers	Member of Parliament for Wells; 1734 – 1735; With: Thomas Edwards	Succeeded by William Piers; George Speke
Preceded by George Speke; Francis Gwyn	Member of Parliament for Wells; 1747 – 1754; With: Francis Gwyn	Succeeded by The Lord Digby; Charles Tudway
