= Llansannor Court =

Grade I listed building in Vale of Glamorgan, UK

Coordinates: 51.48713°N 3.45105°W

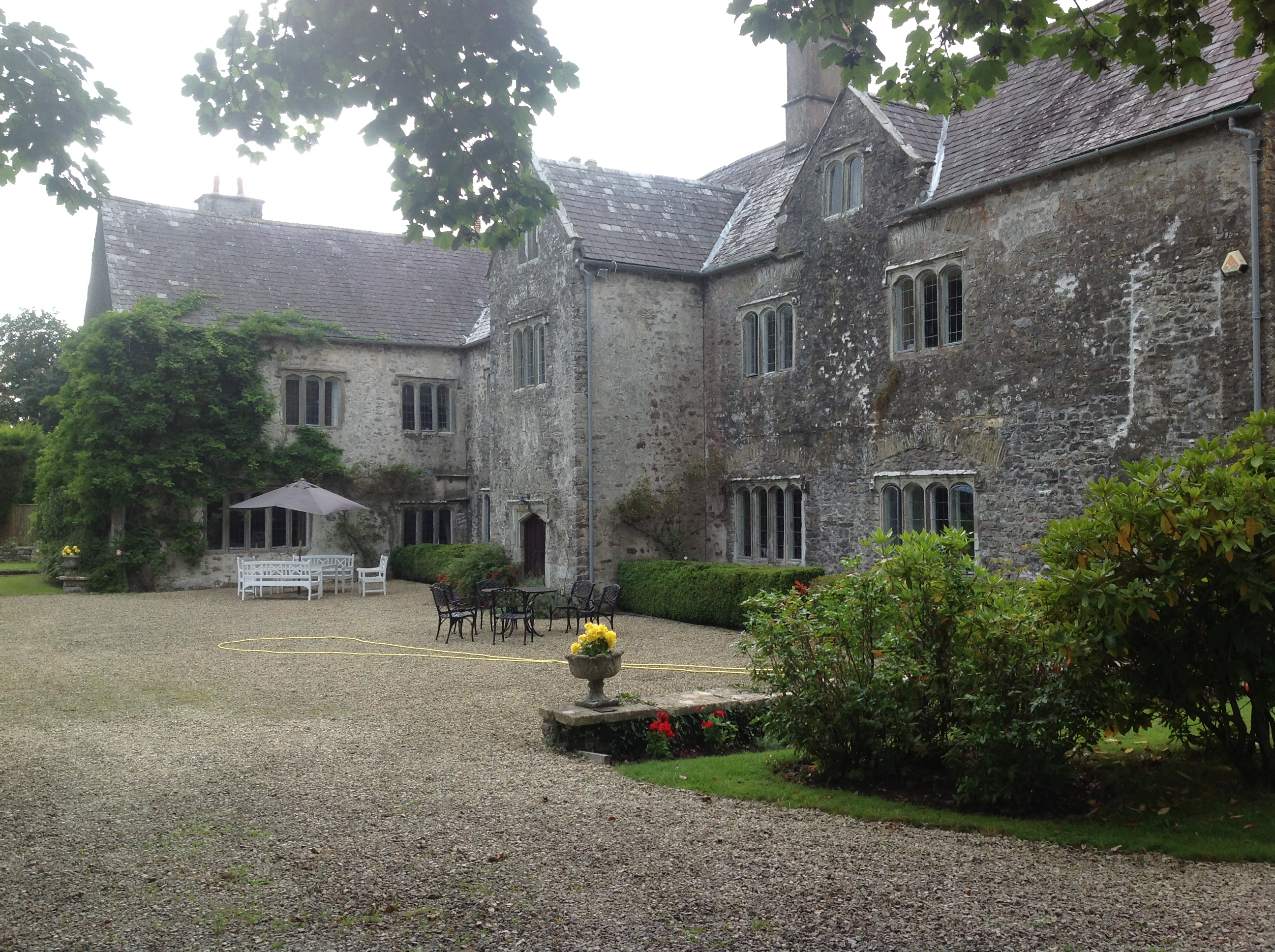
Llansannor Court

Llansannor Court is a Grade I listed building in Llansannor, near Cowbridge in the Vale of Glamorgan, south Wales. It became a Grade I listed building on 16 December 1952. It is believed to have been built during the Elizabethan era.

The walls are of rubble and the roof is slate. The house has two storeys in some places and three in others, is L-shaped, and has stone mullioned windows. During the 18th century it was owned by the politician Francis Gwyn, who inherited it from his father, Edward Gwyn. On Francis's death it passed to his son, Edward Prideaux Gwyn.

Although the fabric of the house is mostly of the 16th and 17th centuries, it was enlarged and refurbished during the Georgian period. However, when the last member of the Gwyn family died in 1846, the entire contents of the house were sold to a wealthy merchant who used only five rooms, allowing the rest of the house to deteriorate. It subsequently passed through several generations of the Roper family, who helped restore the house and gardens.

Within the grounds of Llansannor Court is the local parish church, the Church of St Senwyr, the only one in Wales dedicated to this particular saint.

The house has been used as a filming location for many television programmes, including multiple episodes of Doctor Who, such as "The Unicorn and the Wasp", "Tooth and Claw" and "The Woman Who Lived".

A community organisation called LAMBS ("Llansannor Ancient and Modern Buildings and Settlements") was formed in 1999 in order to plan for the millennium and support local heritage.
