= Jacob Banks (MP for Shaftesbury) =

British Member of Parliament (1704–1738)

Jacob Banks (27 February 1704 – 1738), of Milton Abbas, Dorset, was a British politician who sat in the House of Commons between 1726 and 1738.

Banks was the second son of Sir Jacob Bancks (or Banks), of Milton Abbas, and his wife Mary Tregonwell, only surviving daughter of John Tregonwell, MP of Milton Abbas. Banks's father was originally a Swedish diplomat who served in the Royal Navy, and his mother was formerly married to Francis Luttrell. His father died in December 1724 and when his brother died unmarried in 1725, Banks inherited the manor of Christchurch.

Banks was returned as Member of Parliament for Christchurch at a by-election on 9 April 1726, probably as a Tory, but he lost his seat at the 1727 general election and petitioned unsuccessfully. In 1734 was returned as MP for Shaftesbury, which he represented till his death. He is not recorded as taking part in any vote.

Banks died unmarried on 18 February 1738. He also died intestate, and a complex lawsuit arose, involving the Swedish side of the family.

Parliament of Great Britain
Preceded by (Sir) Peter Mews; Francis Gwyn	Member of Parliament for Christchurch; 1726–1727; With: Edward Prideaux Gwyn	Succeeded by Joseph Hinxman; Charles Wither
Preceded by Sir Edward des Bouverie; Stephen Fox	Member of Parliament for Shaftesbury; 1734–1738; With: Philip Bennet; Stephen Fox 1735	Succeeded by Philip Bennet; Stephen Fox
