= St Senwyr's Church =

Church in Llansannor, Vale of Glamorgan, Wales

Coordinates: 51.48756°N 3.45081°W

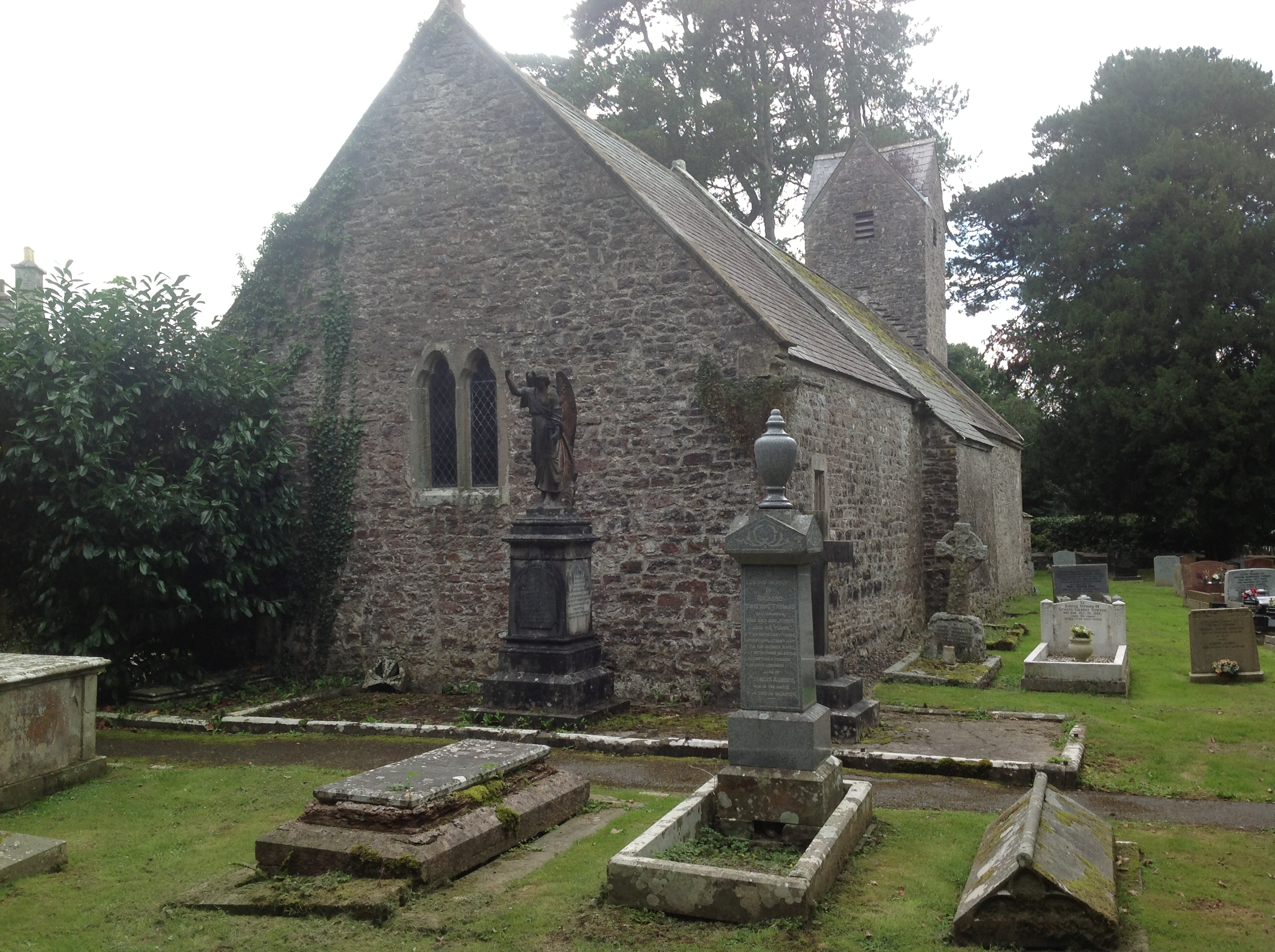
Church of St Senwyr

St Senwyr's Church is a Grade I listed church in Llansannor, in the Vale of Glamorgan, south Wales. It became a Grade I listed building on 22 February 1963.

It is believed that the first record of the church was in 1180 as "Sanctae Senwarae de la Thawe" and was part of the Tewkesbury Abbey holdings. By the 13th century, it is recorded as a possession of the Lords of Glamorgan. It is thought that originally, the church was a chapel of the Church at LLambethian but became independent of LLambethian prior to 1295. The church was also referred to as "Ecclesia de la Tawe" (church/chapel on the River Thaw). The parish was comprised the estates of Brigan and Llansannor Court; the church is situated on the grounds of Llansannor Court.

An 1879 newspaper story relates there was extensive restoration done to the chancel and the churchyard wall. The story also mentions that the church nave was restored and fitted with new seats 26 years prior to the work done in 1879. The church is described as having a main door dated 1674 with furnishings dating mainly from the Victorian era to the mid-1920s. Fragments of wall paintings were discovered in 1969. The cross in the churchyard became a Grade II listed building on 30 April 2004.
