= George Speke (politician, died 1753) =

British landowner and politician

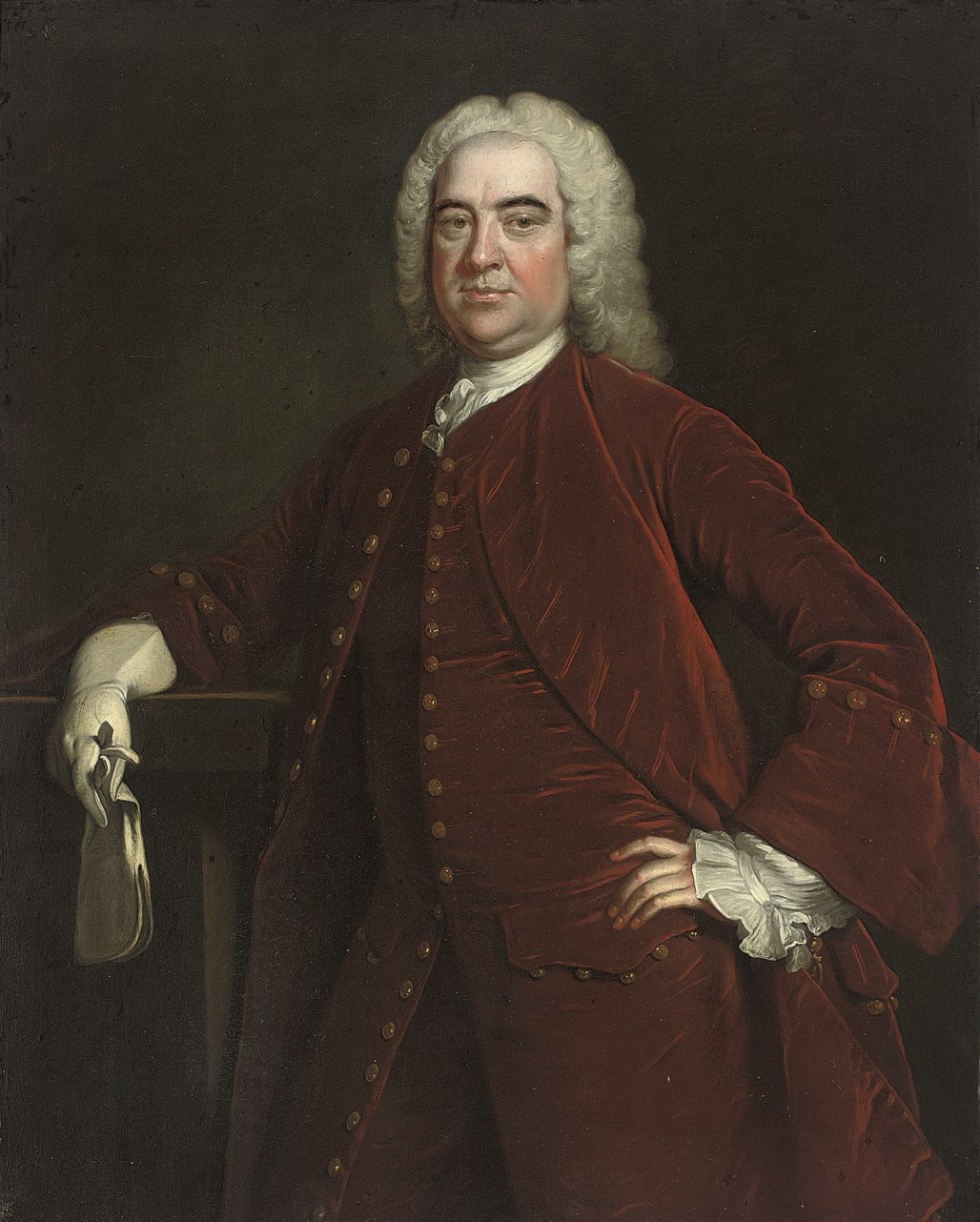
Portrait of George Speke of Curry Revel and White Lackington

George Speke (c.1686–1753), of White Lackington and Dillington, Somerset, was a British landowner and politician who sat in the House of Commons between 1722 and 1747.

Speke was the only son of John Speke of White Lackington and Dillington, MP, a wealthy and influential Somerset landowner and his second wife Elizabeth Pelham, daughter of Robert Pelham of Compton Valence, Dorset. He married Alicia Brooking, daughter of Nicholas Brooking.

Speke stood unsuccessfully for Somerset at the 1715 general election. At the 1722 general election, he was returned unopposed as Member of Parliament for Milborne Port. He was next returned unopposed as MP for Taunton at the 1727 general election. At the 1734 general election, he stood at Wells, where he was defeated at the poll but seated on petition on 25 March 1735. He voted consistently with the Administration and spoke in debates on the army and the national debt. At the 1741 general election he was returned unopposed for Wells and continued to support the Administration. He was defeated at Wells in 1747.

Speke married twice after the death of his wife Alicia. He married Jane, the widowed daughter of William Hockmore of Combe-in-Teignhead, Devon in February 1732. Her former husbands were Palmer of Sharpham Park, Somerset, and William Pitt of Cricket Malherbie, Somerset. He then married, in July 1737, Anne Lady Drake, widow of Sir William Drake, 6th Baronet, of Ashe, Devon and daughter of William Peere Williams of Grey Friars, Chichester Sussex.

Speke died on 2 January 1753, leaving two daughters, but was predeceased by a son and another daughter. By his first wife Alicia he had one surviving daughter Mary who was left £10,000, and by his third wife Anne he had one surviving daughter Anne, who was left the rest of his property and married Lord North.

Parliament of Great Britain
Preceded by Charles Stanhope; James Medlycott	Member of Parliament for Milborne Port; 1722–1727; With: Michael Harvey	Succeeded by Michael Harvey; Thomas Medlycott
Preceded by Abraham Elton; James Smith	Member of Parliament for Taunton; 1727–1734; With: Francis Fane	Succeeded by Henry William Berkeley Portman; Francis Fane
Preceded by Thomas Edwards; George Hamilton	Member of Parliament for Wells; 1735–1747; With: William Piers; Francis Gwyn1741	Succeeded by Francis Gwyn; George Hamilton
