= William Piers (MP) =

British Whig politician

Member of Parliament for Wells
- In office 1735–1741 Serving with George Speke
- Preceded by: Thomas Edwards; George Hamilton
- Succeeded by: Francis Gwyn; George Speke
- In office 1729–1734 Serving with Thomas Edwards
- Preceded by: Thomas Edwards; Edward Prideaux Gwyn
- Succeeded by: Thomas Edwards; George Hamilton
- In office 1716–1722 Serving with William Coward, Thomas Strangways Horner, John Dodd, Thomas Edwards
- Preceded by: Thomas Strangways Horner; Maurice Berkeley
- Succeeded by: Thomas Edwards; Francis Gwyn

Personal details
- Born: 20 May 1686
- Died: 1755 (aged 68–69)
- Party: Whig
- Spouse: Elizabeth Ekins (after 1708)
- Parent(s): William Piers; Catherine Coward

William Piers (20 May 1686 – 1755) of West Bradley, Somerset was a British Whig politician who sat in the House of Commons between 1716 and 1741.

== Early life ==
Prers was the eldest son of William Piers of Wells and his wife Catherine Coward, daughter of William Coward, recorder of Wells.

== Career ==
Piers was one of the leading Whigs at Wells and he stood for Wells several times, but was only returned three times on petition after being defeated at the poll four times. Following the 1715 British general election, he was returned as Member of Parliament for Wells on petition on 30 May 1716. He was defeated at the 1722 British general election. He was defeated again at the 1727 British general election but was this time seated on petition on 18 April 1729. At the 1734 British general election when he had the active support of Walpole, he was defeated at the poll, but returned on petition on 25 March 1735. He did not stand in 1741. He stood at the 1747 British general election but withdrew his petition after presenting it. He voted consistently with the Government.

Piers completed building work at Bradley House in 1726 and included ornamental canals in the grounds.

== Personal life ==
Piers married Elizabeth Ekins, daughter of Harvey Ekins of Weston Favell, Northamptonshire by marriage settlement of 29 December 1708. Together, they were the parents of one son and two daughters, including:

- Elizabeth Piers (d. 1782), who married Capt. Lord Montagu Bertie (d. 1753), a son of Robert Bertie, 1st Duke of Ancaster and Kesteven and, his second wife, Albinia Farington.

He died in 1755.

=== Descendants ===
Through his daughter Elizabeth, he was a grandfather of Augusta Bertie, who married John Fane, 9th Earl of Westmorland.

Parliament of Great Britain
Preceded by Thomas Strangways Horner; Maurice Berkeley	Member of Parliament for Wells; 1716–1722; With: William Coward 1716; Thomas Strangways Horner 1716; John Dodd 1717-1719; Thomas Edwards 1719-1722	Succeeded by Thomas Edwards; Francis Gwyn
Preceded by Thomas Edwards; Edward Prideaux Gwyn	Member of Parliament for Wells; 1729 –1734; With: Thomas Edwards	Succeeded by Thomas Edwards; George Hamilton
Preceded by Thomas Edwards; George Hamilton	Member of Parliament for Wells; 1735–1741; With: George Speke	Succeeded by Francis Gwyn; George Speke
