= Anthony Lechmere (Tewkesbury MP) =

English Member of Parliament

Anthony Lechmere (1674–1720), of Hanley Castle, Worcestershire, was an English Member of Parliament.

He was a Member (MP) of the Parliament of Great Britain for Bewdley from 10 October to 20 December 1710 and for Tewkesbury from 18 June 1714 to 17 June 1717.

Parliament of Great Britain
Preceded by Charles Cornewall	Member of Parliament for Bewdley; 10 October – 20 December 1710	Succeeded by Salwey Winnington
Parliament of Great Britain
Preceded by William Dowdeswell and Charles Dowdeswell	Member of Parliament for Tewkesbury; 18 June 1714 – 17 June 1717; With: William Dowdeswell	Succeeded by William Dowdeswell and Nicholas Lechmere
