= Thomas Edwards (MP for Wells) =

English lawyer and politician

Thomas Edwards (c. 1673 – c. 1745) of Filkins Hall, Oxfordshire, was an English lawyer and politician who sat in the House of Commons from 1713 to 1735.

Edwards was the eldest son of Thomas Edwards of Redland and Broad Street, Bristol, and his first wife. His father was an attorney-at-law, and lawyer for Edward Colston. He matriculated at Balliol College, Oxford on 29 October 1691, at the age of 18 and was admitted at the Middle Temple in 1693. He was awarded BCL at Hart Hall, Oxford, and called to the bar in 1698. He married Mary Hayman, the daughter of Sir William Hayman, merchant and mayor of Bristol, in about 1703. Mary Hayman was also Edward Colston's niece and eventual heir. In about 1704 he moved to Broadwell Parish and acquired Filkins Hall.

Edwards was elected Member of Parliament (MP) for Bristol at the 1713 general election after a turbulent contest, but was defeated at the next election in 1715. He was elected MP for Wells in Somerset at a by-election on 14 December 1719, and topped the poll there at the 1722 general election. He was made a bencher of his Inn in 1724. He was elected MP for Wells again in 1727, and initially returned at the 1734 general election However, he was unseated on petition on 25 March 1735, due to some irregularities in the poll.

Edward died intestate in around June 1743, and left two daughters. Edward's daughters inherited money from Edward Colston through their mother, who was Colston's niece. At her marriage in 1731, the younger daughter Sophia was said to be worth £20,000.

Parliament of Great Britain
Preceded by Edward Colston and Joseph Earle	Member of Parliament for Bristol; 1713–1715; With: Joseph Earle	Succeeded by Sir William Daines and Joseph Earle
Preceded by John Dodd and William Piers	Member of Parliament for Wells; 1719–1735; With: William Piers, to 1722; Francis Gwyn, 1722–1727; Edward Prideaux Gwyn, 1727–1734; William Piers, 1729–1734; George Hamilton, 1734–1735	Succeeded by William Piers and George Speke
