= Thomas Strangways Horner =

British landowner and Tory politician

Thomas Strangways Horner (né Horner; 1688–1741), of Mells, Somerset and Melbury, Dorset, was a British landowner and Tory politician who sat in the House of Commons between 1713 and 1741.

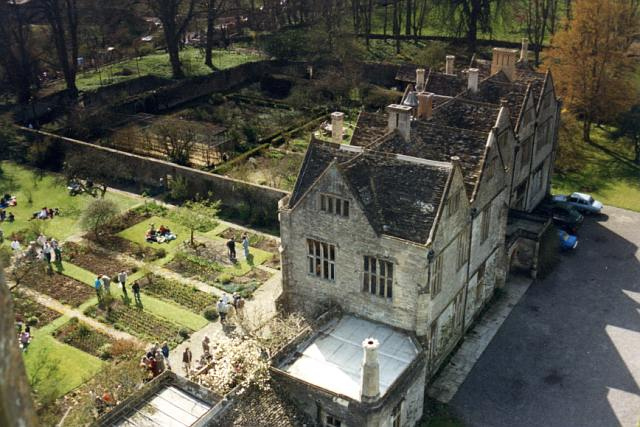
Mells Manor

Horner was baptized on 3 July 1688, the second, but eldest surviving son of George Horner, MP of Mells, Somerset and his wife Elizabeth Fortescue, daughter of Robert Fortescue of Filleigh, Devon. He matriculated at Trinity College, Oxford on 14 May 1705, aged 17. In 1708, he succeeded his father to Mells Manor.

He married Susanna Strangeways, daughter of Thomas Strangways of Melbury House, Dorset in 1713.

Horner was High Sheriff of Somerset for the year 1711 to 1712. In 1713 he became a freeman of Bath. At the 1713 British general election, he was returned unopposed as a Tory Member of Parliament for Somerset. He did not make any impression in Parliament.

At the 1715 British general election Horner was returned in a contest as Tory MP for Wells. Shortly after, he was nearly arrested on the discovery of Wyndham's plans for a western rising. He kept his seat in time to vote against the septennial bill, before he was unseated on petition on 30 May 1716. There was a re-election at which he was returned again in a contest on 27 June 1716, but was unseated on petition again on 12 April 1717. Horner did not stand for Wells again.

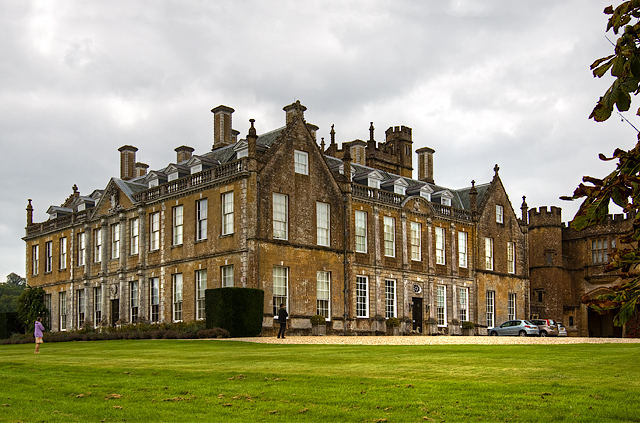
Melbury House

Horner moved out of the Mells Manor house in the village in 1724 and commissioned Nathaniel Ireson to build Park House within Mells Park. In 1726, Horner's wife succeeded to the Strangways Dorset estate of Melbury and he assumed the additional name of Strangways. In 1729 she succeeded to the rest of the Strangways estates on the death of her sister Elizabeth, Duchess of Hamilton.

At the 1727 British general election Horner was returned again unopposed as MP for Somerset. He consistently voted against the Government. He was returned unopposed again at the 1734 British general election and did not stand in 1741.

In 1736 Horner's wife arranged a clandestine marriage between their only daughter Elizabeth, then 13 years old, and Stephen Fox, who was the brother of her paramour Henry Fox. Horner objected strongly to the match, not only because of the bride's age, but also because of the bridegroom's politics. His two sons predeceased him and when he died on 19 November 1742, his Somerset estates passed to his younger brother and his daughter received only the £7,500 to which she was entitled under her parents’ marriage settlement. However, when her mother died in 1758, she inherited the Dorset properties of the Strangways family.

Parliament of Great Britain
| Preceded by Sir Thomas Wroth; Sir William Wyndham, Bt | Member of Parliament for Somerset; 1713–1715; With: Sir William Wyndham, Bt | Succeeded by William Helyar; Sir William Wyndham, Bt |
| Preceded by Sir Thomas Wroth; Maurice Berkeley | Member of Parliament for Wells; 1715–1716; With: Maurice Berkeley | Succeeded by William Coward; William Piers |
| Preceded by William Coward; William Piers | Member of Parliament for Wells; 1716– 1717; With: William Piers | Succeeded by John Dodd; William Piers |
| Preceded by Edward Phelips; Sir William Wyndham, Bt | Member of Parliament for Somerset; 1727–1741; With: Sir William Wyndham, Bt 1727-1740; Thomas Prowse 1740-1741 | Succeeded by Henry William Portman; Thomas Prowse |
