= Peter Mews of Hinton Admiral =

English politician

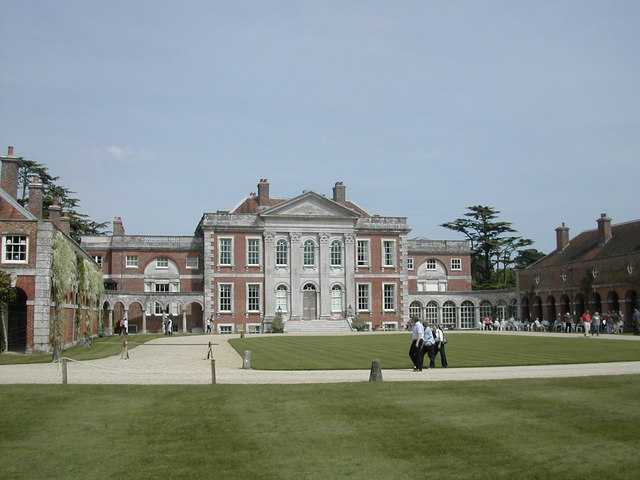
Hinton Admiral House, built by Mews in 1720

Sir Peter Mews (29 August 1672 – 19 March 1726), of Hinton Admiral, was an English politician who sat in the House of Commons from 1710 to 1726.

Mews was the son of Colonel John Mews and his wife Sarah Mellish. He matriculated at St John's College, Oxford and All Souls College, Oxford. His father was a supporter of Cromwell and a colonel in the London Militia, but Peter Mews and his uncle were fervent royalists.

Mews was appointed Chancellor of Winchester Diocese in 1698 by his uncle (Bishop Peter Mews), a post he held until his death in March 1726. He bought the manors of Christchurch and Westover from the Earl of Clarendon in 1708, having previously settled in the area with his purchase of the manor of Hinton Admiral, where he built a mansion in 1720.

Mews was returned as Member of Parliament for Christchurch at the 1710 general election. He was returned again in 1713, 1715 and 1722. He was knighted on 13 July 1712.

Mews died on 19 March 1726. He married, at Westminster Abbey in 1719, Lydia Gervis (1676–1751), daughter and heiress of George Gervis of Islington, whose several sisters' descendants subsequently inherited the estates, Mews having died without issue. Hinton Admiral passed to his nephew George Ivison Tapps, whose descendants still occupy the house.

== See also ==
- George Ivison Tapps inherited Mews' Christchurch and Westover estates in 1778.

Parliament of Great Britain
Preceded by William Ettrick; Francis Gwyn	Member of Parliament for Christchurch; 1710–1726; With: William Ettrick 1710–1717; Francis Gwyn 1717–1724; Edward Prideaux Gwyn 1724–1726	Succeeded by Edward Prideaux Gwyn; Jacob Banks
