= Edward Prideaux Gwyn =

British Tory politician

Edward Prideaux Gwyn (c.1698–1736) of Llansannor Court, Glamorgan. and Forde Abbey, Dorset was a British Tory politician who sat in the House of Commons from 1724 to 1729.

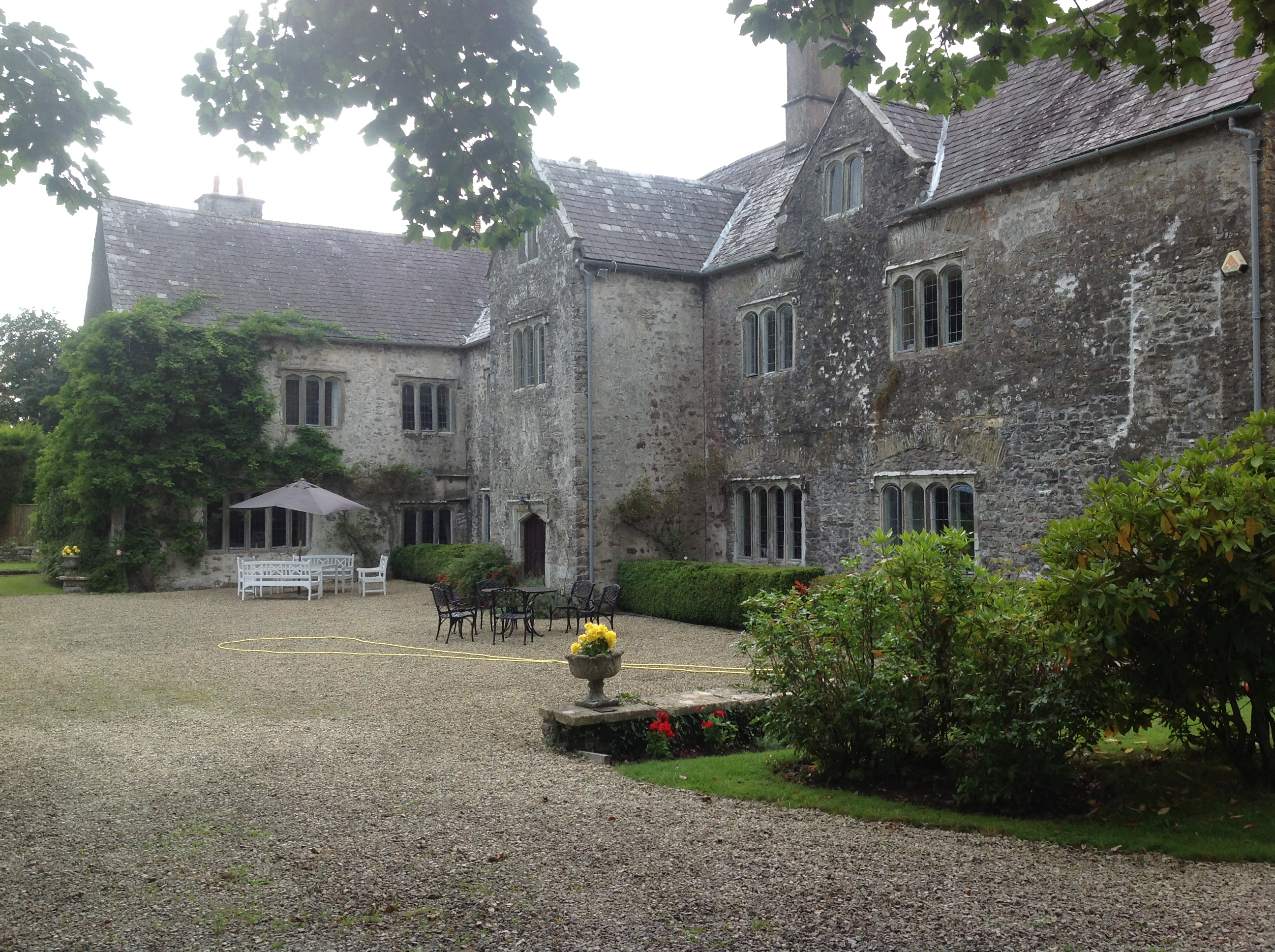
Llansannor Court

Gwyn was the eldest son of Francis of Llansannor, Glamorgan and his wife Margaret Prideaux, daughter of Edmund Prideaux, MP of Forde Abbey, Dorset. His brother Francis was also an MP. He matriculated at Christ Church, Oxford on 9 December 1713, aged 15, and was admitted at Middle Temple on 22 July 1714.

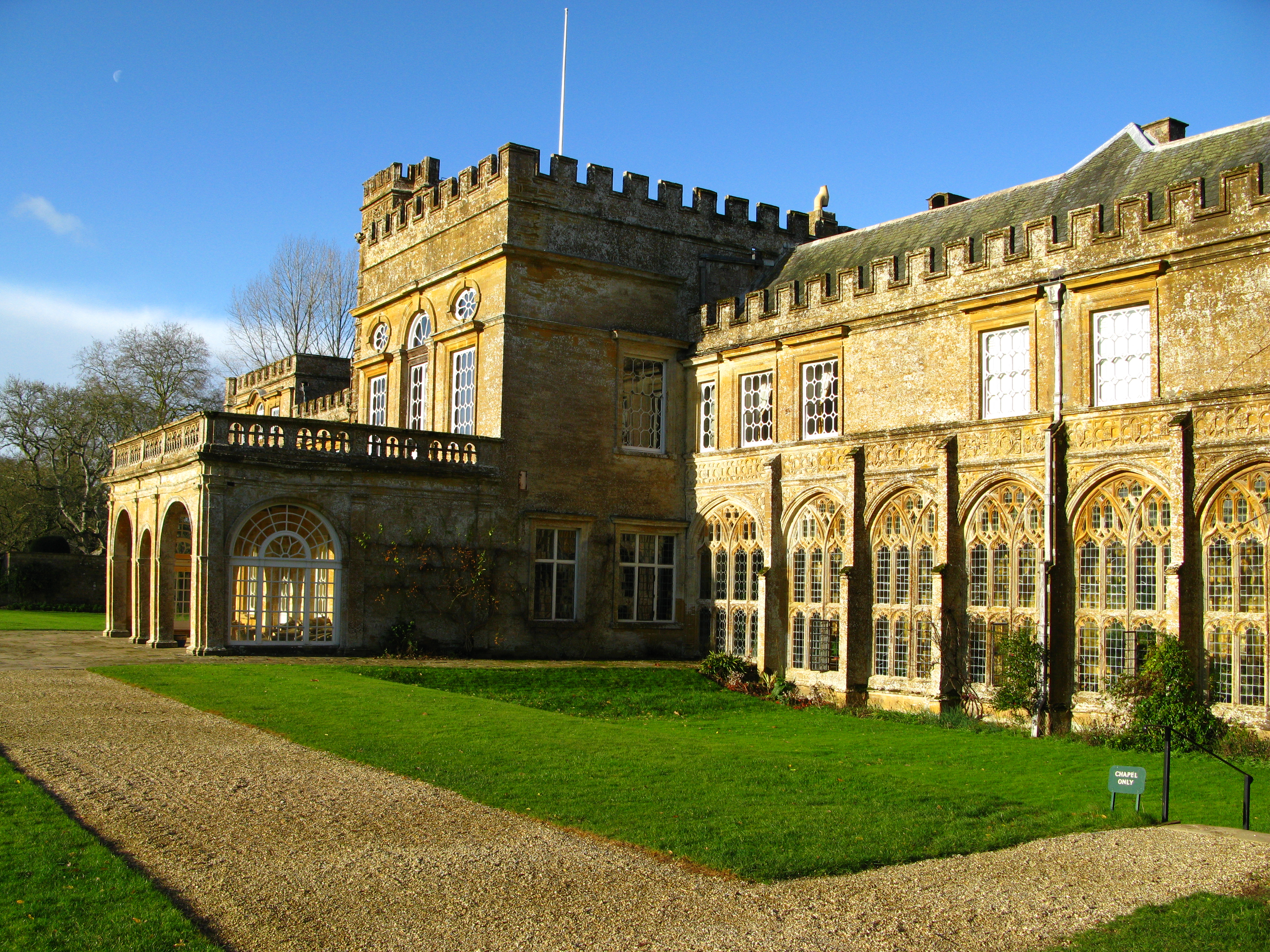
Forde Abbey

Gwyn was elected Tory Member of Parliament for Christchurch at a by-election on 22 February 1724 when his father who had been returned in 1722 decided to sit for Wells instead. At the 1727 general election Gwyn was himself returned as MP for Wells in the poll, but was unseated on petition two years later on 18 April 1729.

Gwyn was an enthusiastic antiquarian, and collected material for a history of Devonshire He was a frequent correspondent of Thomas Hearne, the Oxford antiquary. In 1734, he succeeded to the estates of his father. Gwyn died unmarried in June 1736 and his brother Francis inherited the estates.

Parliament of Great Britain
Preceded by (Sir) Peter Mews; Francis Gwyn	Member of Parliament for Christchurch; 1724–1727; With: (Sir) Peter Mews 1724-1726; Jacob Banks 1726-1727	Succeeded by Joseph Hinxman; Charles Wither
Preceded by Francis Gwyn; Thomas Edwards	Member of Parliament for Wells; 1727–1729; With: Thomas Edwards	Succeeded by William Piers; Thomas Edwards
