= Tooker baronets =

Extinct baronetcy in the Baronetage of England

- Escutcheon of the Tooker baronets of Maddington
- Creation date: 1664
- Status: extinct
- Extinction date: 1675

The Tooker Baronetcy, of Maddington in the County of Wiltshire, was a title in the Baronetage of England. It was created on 1 July 1664 for Giles Tooker. The title became extinct on his death in 1676.

== Tooker baronets, of Maddington (1664) ==
- Sir Giles Tooker, 1st Baronet (c. 1625–1676)
