= Charles Dowdeswell =

Member of Parliament for Tewkesbury
- In office 1713 – June 1714 Serving with William Dowdeswell

Personal details
- Born: 1688
- Died: 1714 (aged 25–26)
- Resting place: Church of St Mary the Virgin, Forthampton
- Parent: William Dowdeswell
- Education: Balliol College, Oxford

Charles Dowdeswell (1688 – 1714) was an English politician. He was one of many in his family to serve as a Member of Parliament (MP) for Tewkesbury.

== See also ==
- List of MPs elected in the 1713 British general election
