= Sir Thomas Wroth, 3rd Baronet =

English High Sheriff and Member of Parliament

Sir Thomas Wroth, 3rd Baronet (c.1674–1721) of Petherton Park, Somerset was an English High Sheriff and Member of Parliament.

He was born the only surviving son of Sir John Wroth, 2nd Baronet, of Petherton Park. He succeeded his father in 1677 as a very young child, inheriting his Petherton Park estate. He was educated at Winchester School.

He was MP in succession for Bridgwater from 1701 to 1708, for Somerset from 1710 to 1713 and for Wells for 1713 to 1715. He was pricked High Sheriff of Somerset for 1708–09.

He died in 1721. He had married in 1693 Mary, the daughter of Thomas Osbaldeston of Aldersbrook, Essex and had 2 daughters. The baronetcy thus became extinct. His estate was inherited by his eldest daughter Cicely and her husband Sir Hugh Acland, 6th Baronet. His younger daughter Elizabeth married lawyer and MP Thomas Palmer, FRS.

Parliament of England
Preceded by John Gilbert; George Balch	Member of Parliament for Bridgwater; 1701–1707; With: George Balch	Succeeded by Parliament of Great Britain
Parliament of Great Britain
Preceded by Parliament of England	Member of Parliament for Bridgwater; 1707–1708; With: George Balch	Succeeded by George Balch; George Dodington
Preceded by Henry Seymour Portman; Sir William Wyndham, Bt	Member of Parliament for Somerset; 1710–1713; With: Sir William Wyndham, Bt	Succeeded by Thomas Strangways Horner; Sir William Wyndham, Bt
Preceded by Edward Colston; Maurice Berkeley	Member of Parliament for Wells; 1713–1715; With: Maurice Berkeley	Succeeded by Thomas Strangways Horner; Maurice Berkeley
Baronetage of England
Preceded by John Wroth	Baronet (of Blenden Hall); 1677–1721	Extinct
