= Anthony Ettrick =

English politician

Anthony Ettrick MP

Member of Parliament for Christchurch
- In office 1685–1689
- Preceded by: George Fulford
- Succeeded by: William Ettrick

Personal details
- Born: 15 November 1622
- Died: 5 October 1703 (aged 80)
- Party: Tory
- Children: William Ettrick
- Occupation: Magistrate

Anthony Ettrick (15 November 1622 – 5 October 1703) was an English politician.

== Personal life and career ==
Anthony Ettrick was a magistrate and recorder of Poole. He served as a magistrate in a controversial case, where he sentenced the Duke of Monmouth to death in the Tower of London after the Monmouth Rebellion against the King. His son, William Ettrick, replaced him in Parliament.

Ettrick's largest legacy is his coffin, which has become part of the folklore in Wimborne, earning him the nickname of "The Man in the Wall." He notably fought Wimborne Minster authorities on his place of burial, resolved through his burial neither inside nor outside of Minster. He decided to have a coffin crafted, believing that he would die in 1693, which is etched into the side of his tomb and later corrected for his actual date of death, 1703. Ettrick's Tomb in Wimbourne Minster is currently located in a recess in the Minster Church.
