= Nicholas Lechmere, 1st Baron Lechmere =

English lawyer and Whig politician

Nicholas Lechmere, 1st Baron Lechmere PC (5 August 1675 – 18 June 1727) was an English lawyer and Whig politician who sat in the House of Commons from 1708 until 1721 when he was raised to the peerage as Baron Lechmere. He served as Attorney General and Chancellor of the Duchy of Lancaster.

== Life ==
Lechmere was the second son of Edmund Lechmere of Hanley Castle, Worcestershire, and the younger brother of Anthony Lechmere, MP. He was admitted at Middle Temple in 1693 and called to the bar on 25 October 1698. In 1708, he became King's counsel. He made a profitable career as a lawyer, where he followed the profession of his grandfather Sir Nicholas Lechmere.

Lechmere was elected in a contest as Member of Parliament for Appleby at the 1708 general election. He transferred to Cockermouth at the 1710 general election and was returned MP in contests then and in 1713. He was one of the authors who drafted legislation concerning Scotland in January 1710. He opposed the Tory ministry's peace policy after 1710 and supported Dissenters’ rights. During Queen Anne's reign he was known as a spokesman of the Whigs, and led parliamentary opposition to the French Commerce Bill of 1713. In 1714 Lechmere was appointed Solicitor General and made a Reader of his Inn. In 1715 he became Treasurer of the Inn.

Lechmere was returned unopposed as MP for Cockermouth at the 1715 general election. He replaced his brother as MP for Tewkesbury at a by-election on 12 June 1717. In 1718, he was appointed Attorney General and also became a Privy Counsellor and Chancellor of the Duchy of Lancaster. On 4 September 1721, having ceased to be attorney-general, he was raised to the peerage as Baron Lechmere of Evesham in the County of Worcester and vacated his seat in the House of Commons.

Lechmere was also a collaborator with Richard Steele on his pamphlet The Crisis.

Lechmere died from a sudden attack of apoplexy, while seated at table, at Campden House, Kensington, on 18 June 1727, and was buried at Hanley Castle, where there is a tablet inscribed to his memory.

== Family ==
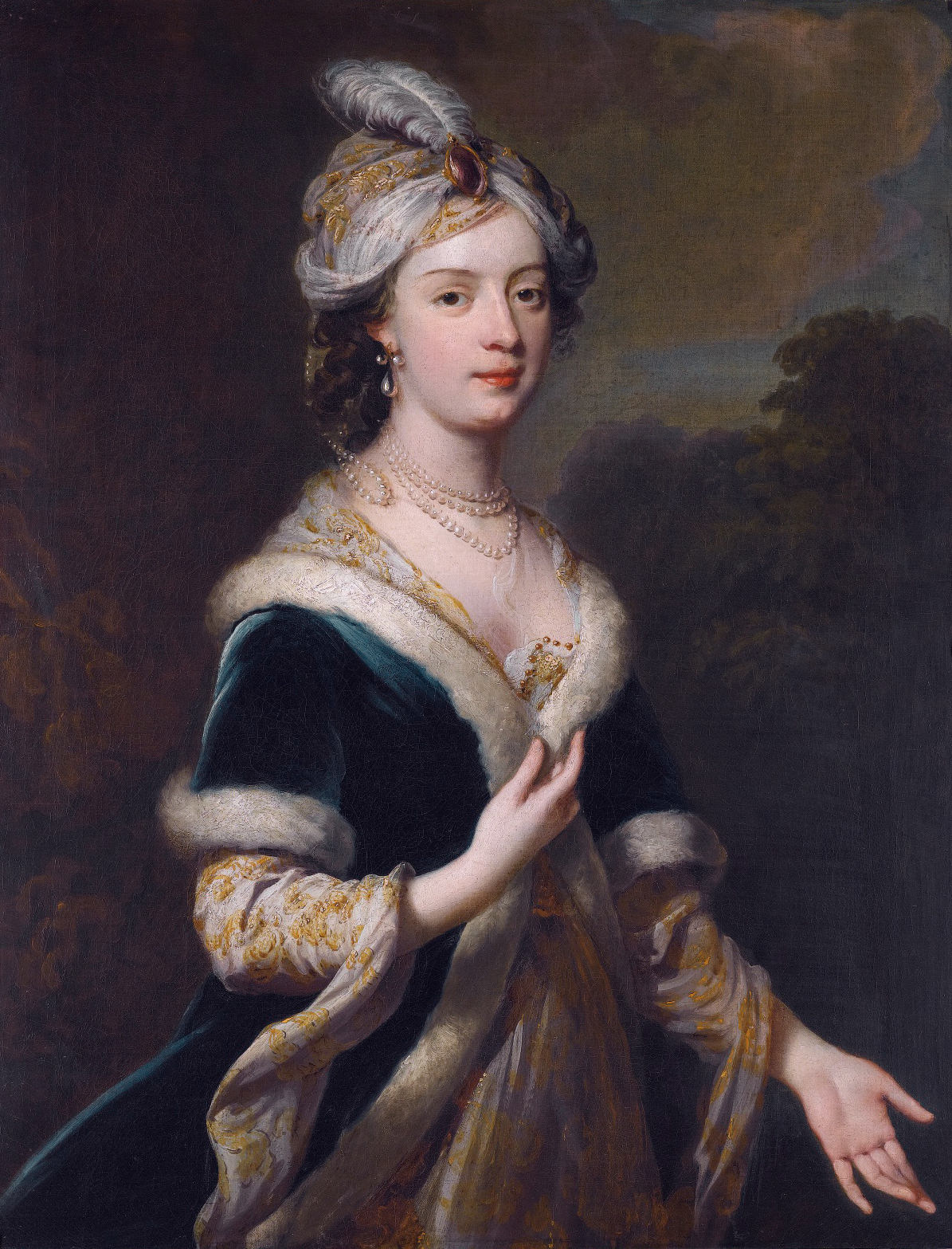
Elizabeth Howard (1701-1739) (George Knapton, circa 1730)

Lechmere married Lady Elizabeth Howard, daughter of Charles Howard, 3rd Earl of Carlisle in 1719, but they had no children and his title became extinct on his death in 1727.

Parliament of Great Britain
| Preceded by James Grahme; William Harvey | Member of Parliament for Appleby; 1708–1710; With: Edward Duncombe | Succeeded by Edward Duncombe; Thomas Lutwyche |
| Preceded by James Stanhope; Albemarle Bertie | Member of Parliament for Cockermouth; 1710–1717; With: James Stanhope 1710–1713; Joseph Musgrave 1713–1715; James Stanhope 1715–1717; Sir Thomas Pengelly 1717 | Succeeded by Sir Thomas Pengelly; Lord Percy Seymour |
| Preceded by William Dowdeswell; Anthony Lechmere | Member of Parliament for Tewkesbury; 1717–1721; With: William Dowdeswell | Succeeded by William Dowdeswell; The Viscount Gage |
Peerage of Great Britain
| New creation | Baron Lechmere; 1721–1727 | Extinct |
Political offices
| Preceded by Sir Robert Raymond | Solicitor General; 1714–1715 | Succeeded by John Fortescue Aland |
| Preceded by Sir Edward Northey | Attorney General; 1718–1720 | Succeeded by Sir Robert Raymond |
| Preceded by The Earl of Scarbrough | Chancellor of the Duchy of Lancaster; 1718–1727 | Succeeded by The Duke of Rutland |
