= William Dowdeswell (politician, born 1682) =

British land-owner and politician

William Dowdeswell (18 August 1682 – 5 September 1728) was a British land-owner and politician who sat in the House of Commons from 1712 to 1722.

== Early life ==
Dowdeswell was the son of Richard Dowdeswell, MP of Pull Court, Bushley, Worcestershire. His family owned the Pull Court estate near Bushley in Worcestershire. Several members of the family were MPs, including William's father, who was MP for Tewkesbury in ten successive parliaments. He was educated at Eton College and matriculated at Christ Church, Oxford in 1700 and then travelled abroad. In 1711 he succeeded his father. He married as his first wife Katharine Cokayne, daughter of Charles Cokayne, 3rd Viscount Cullen on 13 March 1712.

== Political career ==
Dowdeswell was returned unopposed as Member of Parliament (MP) for Tewkesbury at a by-election on 1 January 1712. He was returned again unopposed in 1713. At the 1715 he was returned again as MP for Tewkesbury. He did not stand there at the 1722 general election. He was appointed Sheriff of Worcestershire for 1726. He married secondly on 5 August 1719, Amy Hammond, daughter of Anthony Hammond, MP and poet, of Somersham, Huntingdonshire.He was appointed Sheriff of Worcestershire for 1726.

== Later life and legacy ==
Dowdeswell died in 1728. He had a son and a daughter by his first wife and four sons by his second. He was succeeded by his son William Dowdeswell, who later became Chancellor of the Exchequer.

Parliament of Great Britain
Preceded by Henry Ireton; William Bromley	Member of Parliament for Tewkesbury; 1712–1722; With: William Bromley to 1713; Charles Dowdeswell 1713–1714; Anthony Lechmere 1714–1717; Nicholas Lechmere 1717–1721; Viscount Gage from 1721	Succeeded by George Reade; Viscount Gage
