= Francis Gwyn =

Welsh politician and official

1698 bookplate of Francis Gwyn, reads: "Francis Gwyn of Lansanor in the County of Glamorgan. And of Ford Abby in the Country of Devon. Esqr. 1698"

Francis Gwyn PC (1648 – 14 June 1734), of Llansannor Court, was a Welsh Tory politician who sat in the English and British Houses of Commons at various times between 1673 and 1727.

== Background ==
Gwyn was the son and heir of Edward Gwyn of Llansannor, Glamorganshire, who married Eleanor, youngest daughter of Sir Francis Popham of Littlecott, Wiltshire. He was born at Combe Florey in Somerset about 1648. He matriculated at Christ Church, Oxford, on 1 June 1666, aged 17 and was admitted at Middle Temple in 1667. Although he trained as a lawyer, he had ample means and went into politics.

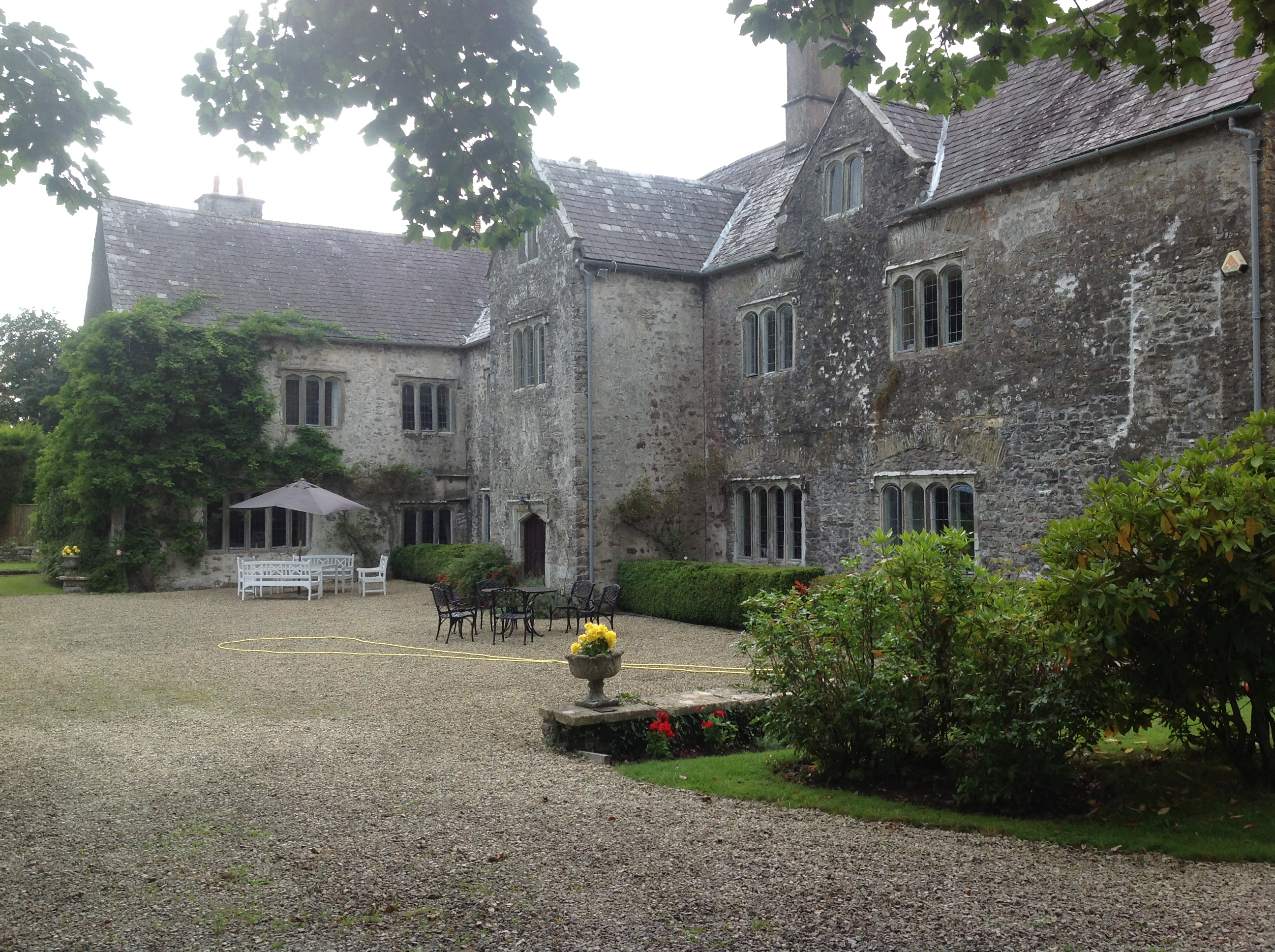
Llansannor Court

== Member of Parliament ==
Gwyn was elected as Member of Parliament for Chippenham at the general election of 1673 and although his election was voided on 6 February, he was returned at a by-election on 11 February 1673. He was defeated at Chippenham at the 1679 general election and remained outside the House of Commons discharging his official duties. At the 1685 general election he was returned unopposed as MP for Cardiff. He was returned unopposed as MP for Christchurch on the recommendation of Lord Clarendon in 1689 and sat in the Convention Parliament of 1689 to 1690 and in its successor from 1690 to 1695.

At the 1695 general election, Gwyn was returned unopposed as MP for Callington. He was returned unopposed as MP for Totnes at a by-election on 11 January 1699 and at the first general election of 1701. He was then returned unopposed for Christchurch at the second general election of 1701, in 1702, 1705 and in 1708. At the 1710 general election he was elected MP for Totnes and was returned unopposed in 1713.

Gwyn was a Tory, and lost his seat at 1715 general election after the accession of George I. He was returned unopposed as MP for Christchurch at a by-election on 9 March 1717. At the general election in 1722 he was both returned unopposed for Christchurch and elected in a contest at Wells and chose to sit for Wells. At the dissolution in 1727 he retired from parliamentary life.

== Official ==
In return for the sum of £2,500 Sir Robert Southwell vacated for Gwyn the post of clerk of the council, and he was sworn in on 5 December 1679, holding the office until January 1685. Until the death of Charles II he was a Groom of the Bedchamber, and he was twice under-secretary of state, from February 1681 to January 1683, under his cousin, Edward, Earl of Conway, and from Christmas 1688 to Michaelmas 1689.

When Lord Rochester was lord high treasurer under James II, Gwyn was joint secretary to the treasury with Henry Guy, and when Rochester was made lord-lieutenant of Ireland in 1701 Gwyn was his chief secretary, and a privy councillor. At one time he served as a commissioner of public accounts. From June 1711 to August 1713 he was a commissioner of the board of trade, and he was then secretary at war until 24 September 1714, when he received a letter of dismissal from Lord Townshend. He was recorder of Totnes and steward of Brecknock.

== Works and correspondence ==
The minutes of the business which he transacted during his periods of office were sold with the effects of Ford Abbey in 1846. He accompanied James on his expedition to the west in November 1688, and his diary of the journey was printed by C. T. Gatty in the Fortnightly Review, xlvi. 358–64 (1886). When the House of Lords met at the Guildhall, London, in December 1688, he acted as their secretary, and kept a journal of the proceedings.

Several letters by Gwyn dated 1686 and 1687, one of which was written when he was setting out with Lord Rochester and James Kendall on a visit to Spa, are printed in the 'Ellis Correspondence' (ed. by Lord Dover), i. 170–171, 202–3, 253–4, 314–15. In 'Notes and Queries,' 2nd ser. xii. 44 (1861), is inserted a letter from him to Harley, introducing Narcissus Luttrell the diarist, and many other communications to and from him are referred to in the Historical MSS. Commission's reports. The constancy of his friendship with Rochester was so notorious that in the 'Wentworth Papers,' p. 163, occurs the sentence 'Frank Gwin, Lord Rotchester's gwine as they call him.'

== Family ==
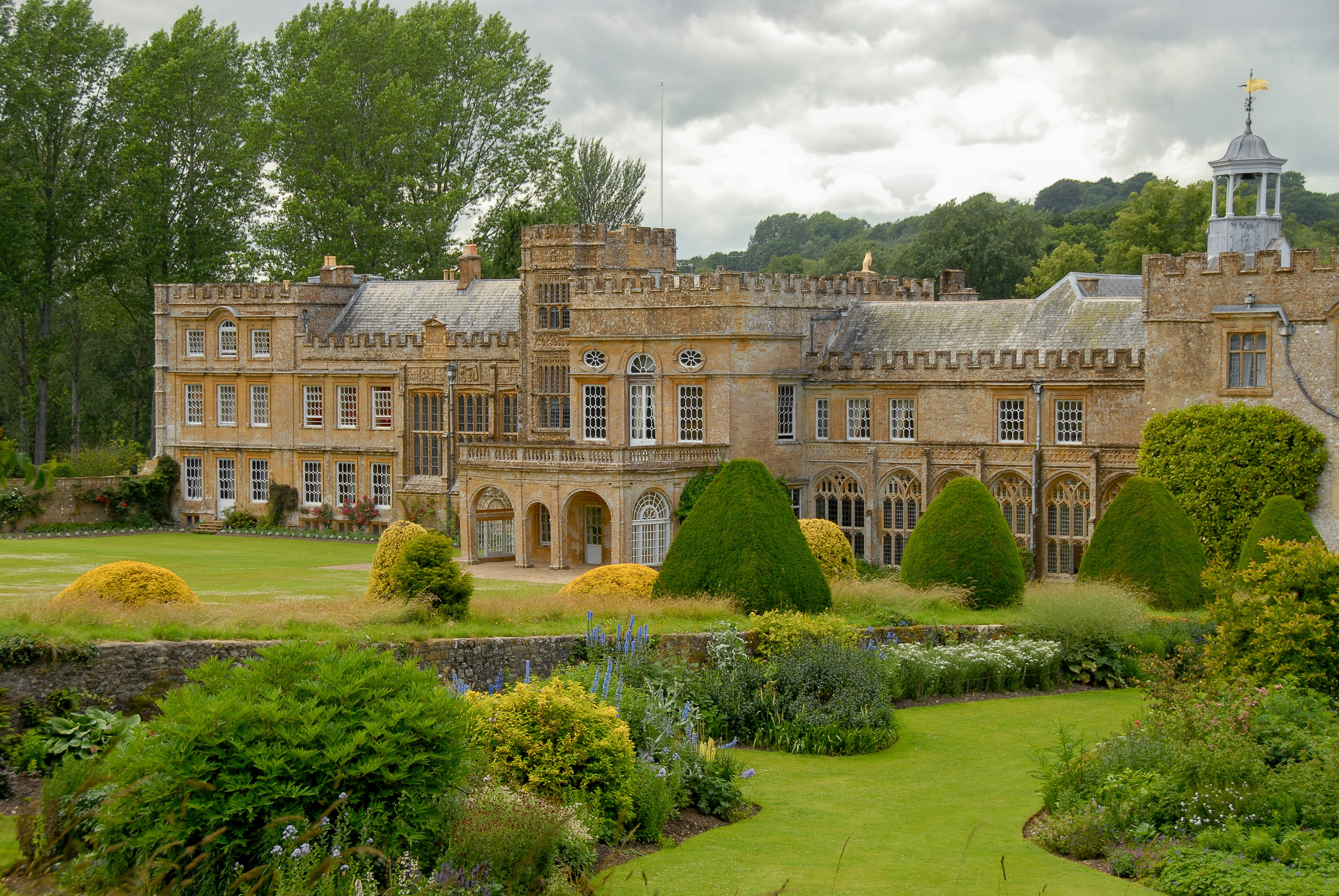
Forde Abbey, Dorset

In 1690 Gwyn married his cousin Margaret Prideaux, third daughter of Edmund Prideaux, and his wife Amy Fraunceis, coheiress of John Fraunceis of Combe Florey, and granddaughter of Edmund Prideaux, attorney-general of Cornwall. They had four sons and three daughters, besides others who died young, and their issue is set out in the pedigree in John Hutchins's History of Dorset. He was succeeded in turn by his son Edward and William who were also Members of Parliament.

By his marriage Gwyn eventually became owner of the property of that branch of the Prideaux family, including Forde Abbey. The property passed from the family on the death of J. F. Gwyn in 1846, when there was an eight days' sale of the abbey's contents. The sale of the plate, some of which had belonged to Francis Gwyn, occupied almost the whole of the first day. The family portraits, collected by him and his father-in-law, were also sold. In the grand saloon was hung the tapestry said to have been wrought at Arras, and given to Gwyn by Queen Anne, depicting the cartoons of Raphael, for which Catharine of Russia, through Count Orloff, offered £30,000; and this was sold to the new proprietor for £2,200. One room at Ford Abbey was called 'Queen Anne's,' for whom it was fitted up when its owner was secretary at war; and the walls were adorned with tapestry representing a Welsh wedding; the furniture and tapestry were also purchased for preservation with the house.

Gwyn died at Forde Abbey on 2 June 1734, aged 86, and was buried in its chapel.

Parliament of England
| Preceded by Sir Edward Hungerford; Henry Bayntun | Member of Parliament for Chippenham; 1673–1679; With: Sir Edward Hungerford | Succeeded by Sir Edward Hungerford; Sir John Talbot |
| Preceded by Bussy Mansell | Member of Parliament for Cardiff Boroughs; 1685–1687 | Succeeded by Thomas Mansel |
| Preceded by Sir Thomas Clarges; Anthony Ettrick | Member of Parliament for Christchurch; 1689–1695; With: William Ettrick | Succeeded by Viscount Cornbury; William Ettrick |
| Preceded by Jonathan Prideaux; Francis Fulford | Member of Parliament for Callington; 1695–1698; With: Sir William Coryton | Succeeded by Sir William Coryton; Francis Fulford |
| Preceded by Sir Edward Seymour, 4th Baronet; Thomas Coulson | Member of Parliament for Totnes; 1699–1701; With: Thomas Coulson | Succeeded by Sir Christopher Musgrave, Bt; Thomas Coulson |
| Preceded by Viscount Cornbury; William Ettrick | Member of Parliament for Christchurch; 1701–1708; With: William Ettrick | Succeeded by Parliament of Great Britain |
Parliament of Great Britain
| Preceded by Parliament of England | Member of Parliament for Christchurch; 1708–1710; With: William Ettrick | Succeeded by (Sir) Peter Mews; William Ettrick |
| Preceded by Sir Edward Seymour, 5th Baronet; George Courtenay | Member of Parliament for Totnes; 1710–1715; With: Thomas Coulson; Stephen Northleigh | Succeeded by Stephen Northleigh; Arthur Champernowne |
| Preceded by (Sir) Peter Mews; William Ettrick | Member of Parliament for Christchurch; 1717–1722; With: (Sir) Peter Mews | Succeeded by (Sir) Peter Mews; Edward Prideaux Gwyn |
| Preceded by Thomas Edwards; William Piers | Member of Parliament for Wells; 1722–1727; With: Thomas Edwards | Succeeded by Thomas Edwards; Edward Prideaux Gwyn |
Political offices
| Preceded by Humphrey May | Chief Secretary for Ireland; 1701–1703 | Succeeded by Edward Southwell |
