= John Dodd (Wells MP) =

English politician

John Dodd (c. 1693 – 25 August 1719) was an English politician who sat in the House of Commons from 1717 to 1719.

Dodd was the only surviving son of Sir Samuel Dodd, chief baron of the Exchequer, and his wife Isabel Croke, daughter of Sir Robert Croke, MP, of Chequers, Buckinghamshire. He was admitted at Inner Temple in 1706 and matriculated at Oriel College, Oxford on 2 July 1709, aged 16. He succeeded his father in 1716.

Dodd stood for parliament in a by election for Wells on 27 June 1716. He was defeated initially, but was seated on petition on 12 April 1717 as member of parliament for Wells.

Dodd died unmarried and intestate on 25 August 1719. His estates passed to his first cousin once removed, another John Dodd.
