= Llansannor =

Hamlet in the Vale of Glamorgan, Wales

Coordinates: 51.4879°N 3.4506°W

Llansannor: Welsh: Llansanwyr
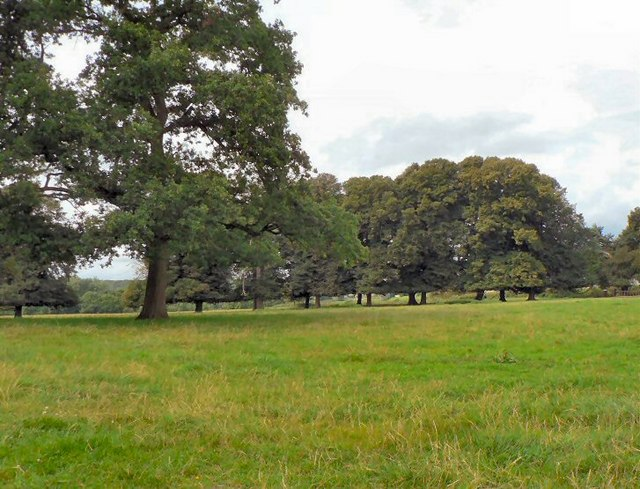

- Location within the Vale of Glamorgan
- OS grid reference: SS994775
- Principal area: Vale of Glamorgan
- Preserved county: South Glamorgan
- Country: Wales
- Sovereign state: United Kingdom
- Postcode district: CF
- Police: South Wales
- Fire: South Wales
- Ambulance: Welsh
- UK Parliament: Vale of Glamorgan
- Senedd Cymru – Welsh Parliament: Vale of Glamorgan

Llansannor (Welsh: Llansanwyr) is a small hamlet in the Vale of Glamorgan, Wales, United Kingdom.

It has a population of roughly 200 people. It contains a parish church, a pub (the City Inn, now closed), a primary school and a village hall, which has recently been rebuilt thanks to the efforts of the parishioners.

Llansannor is traditionally a parish, until the last century comprising little more than a collection of farms spread out across Llansannor Hill (Mynydd y Fforest) and now incorporating the present hamlet of City and a collection of houses built in the grounds of Llansannor Court between the 1970s and 90s. Present day farms in the parish include Church Farm, Gelli Goll Farm and Windmill Farm. While agriculture remains important to the character of the area, many residents of the village are retirees or commute to work in nearby Cardiff.

The Valeways Millennium Heritage Trail passes through the parish, and the source of the River Thaw is nearby.

Famous residents include J. P. R. Williams, former Welsh rugby union fullback.

== Population statistics ==
Population density (people / sq mi)	0.9
Gender split (females / male)	1.03
Average commute	12.89 miles
Average age	42
Home ownership	16.9%
Student population	2.6%
People in good health	73%
