= William Ettrick =

English politician

William Ettrick MP

Member of Parliament for Christchurch
- In office 1689 – 5 December 1716

Member of Parliament for Poole
- In office 1685–1687
- Preceded by: Henry Trenchard
- Succeeded by: Henry Trenchard

Personal details
- Born: 1651 Middle Temple, London
- Died: 5 December 1716 (aged 64–65)
- Party: Tory
- Education: Trinity College, Oxford
- Occupation: Member of Parliament

William Ettrick (1651 – 5 December 1716) was an English politician who represented the constituencies of Poole and Christchurch in the House of Commons of England.

He was a Member of Parliament at the time of the Acts of Union 1707 and sat in the First Parliament of Great Britain.

== Life ==
He sat in both the House of Commons of England and the House of Commons of Great Britain.

== Family ==
He was the son of MP Anthony Ettrick.
