= Williams baronets =

Set index for Williams baronets

There have been 21 baronetcies created for persons with the surname Williams, eight in the Baronetage of England, three in the Baronetage of Great Britain and ten in the Baronetage of the United Kingdom. As of 2026 six of the creations are extant.

- Williams baronets of Vaynol (1622)
- Williams baronets of Marnhull (1642)
- Williams baronets of Minster (1642): see Sir John Williams, 1st Baronet (c. 1609–1669)
- Williams baronets of Llangibby (1642)
- Williams baronets of Guernevet (1644)
- Williams, later Williams-Bulkeley baronets, of Penrhyn (1661): see Williams-Bulkeley baronets
- Williams baronets of Elham (1674)
- Williams, later Williams-Wynn baronets, of Gray's Inn (1688): see Williams-Wynn baronets
- Williams baronets, of Edwinsford (1707): see Sir Nicholas Williams, 1st Baronet (1681–1745)
- Williams baronets of Clapton (1747)
- Williams baronets of Bodelwyddan (1798)
- Williams baronets of Kars (1856): see Sir William Fenwick Williams, 1st Baronet (1800–1883)
- Williams baronets of Tregullow (1866)
- Williams baronets of the City of London (1894):see Sir John Williams, 1st Baronet (1840–1926)
- Williams baronets of Castell Deudraeth and Borthwen (1909)
- Williams baronets of Bridehead (1915)
- Williams, later Rhys Williams baronets, of Miskin (1918): see Rhys-Williams baronets
- Williams baronets of Park (1928): see Sir Robert Williams, 1st Baronet (1860–1938)
- Williams baronets of Glyndwr (1935): see Sir Evan Williams, 1st Baronet (1871–1959)
- Williams baronets of Cilgeraint (1953)
- Williams baronets of Llanelly (1955): see Sir George Clark Williams, 1st Baronet (1878–1958)

== See also ==
- Williams-Drummond baronets
- Dudley-Williams baronets
- Griffies-Williams baronets
