= Gilly Williams =

English official and letter writer

George James Williams (1719–1805), known familiarly as Gilly Williams, was an English official, known as a wit and letter writer.

== Life ==
Born at Denton, Lincolnshire, he was a younger son of William Peere Williams and Anne, daughter of Sir George Hutchins. Through the influence of Lord North, who married in 1756 a daughter of Williams's sister, he obtained on 8 November 1774 the post of Receiver-General of Excise, which he held until 1801.

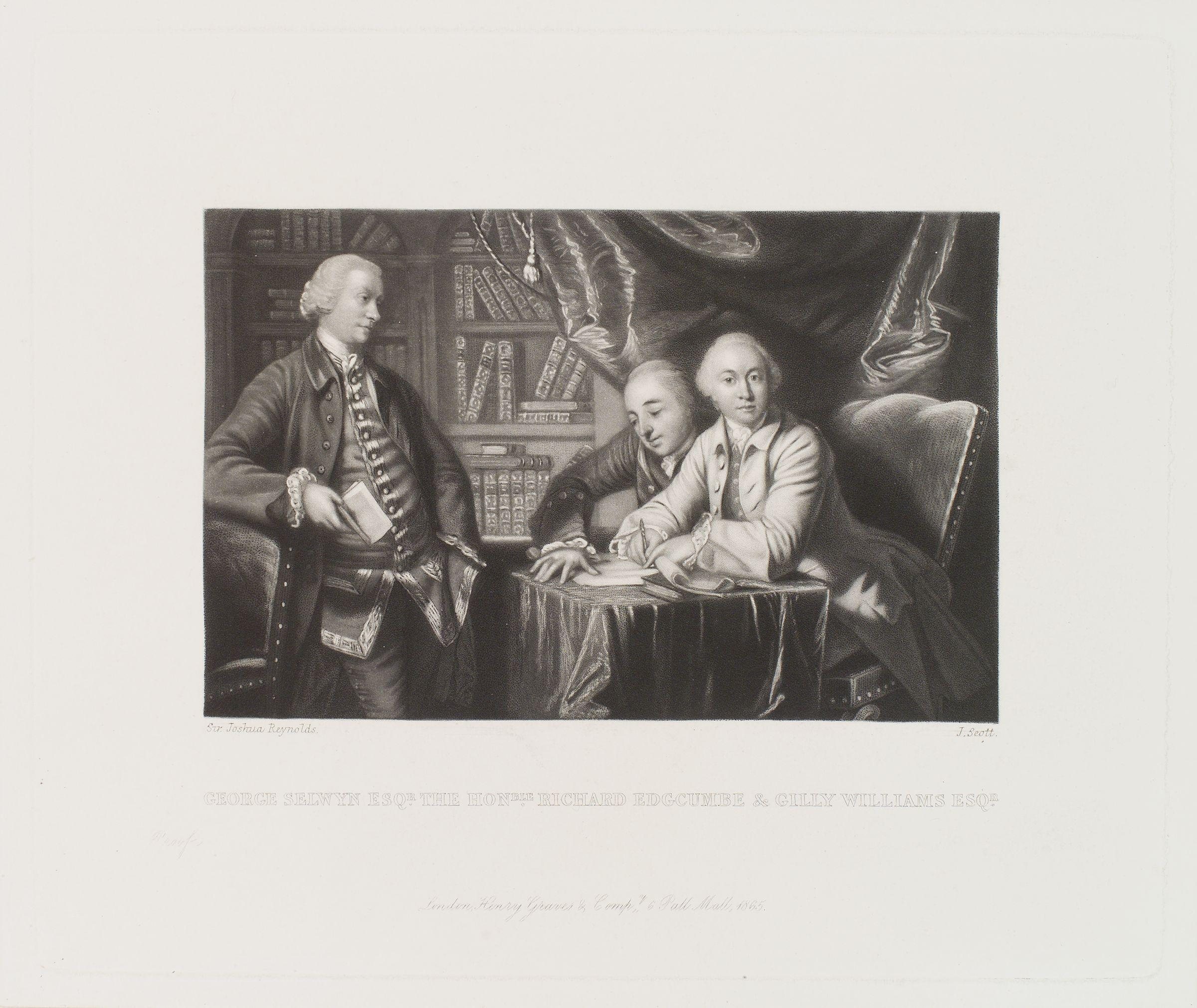
George Selwyn, Richard Edgcumbe, and George James Williams, engraving by James Scott, after Joshua Reynolds

Williams made up, with George Selwyn, Richard Edgecumbe and Horace Walpole, a group who met at stated periods in the year at Strawberry Hill. He also met his friends for "wit and whist" in Selwyn's Thursday Club at the Star and Garter in Pall Mall. He dropped out of his old circle, and little is heard of him after 1770. He died in Cleveland Court, St. James's, near the house where his friend Selwyn had lived, on 28 November 1805.

== Family ==
Williams married, on 30 July 1752, Diana, daughter of William Coventry, 5th Earl of Coventry, who appears to have died early without issue.

== Notes ==
Attribution

This article incorporates text from a publication now in the public domain: Lee, Sidney, ed. (1900). "Williams, George James". Dictionary of National Biography. Vol. 61. London: Smith, Elder & Co.
