= Walter Waring =

Walter Waring may refer to:

- Walter Waring (died 1724), member of parliament (MP) for Bishop's Castle 1689–1690 and 1690–1695
- Walter Waring (1726–1780), MP for Bishop's Castle 1755–1759
- Walter Waring (Liberal politician) (1876–1930), MP for Banffshire (1907–1918), Blaydon (1918–1922), and Berwick & Haddington (1922–1923)
- Walter Waring (died 1780), British politician
