= Williams baronets of Clapton (1747) =

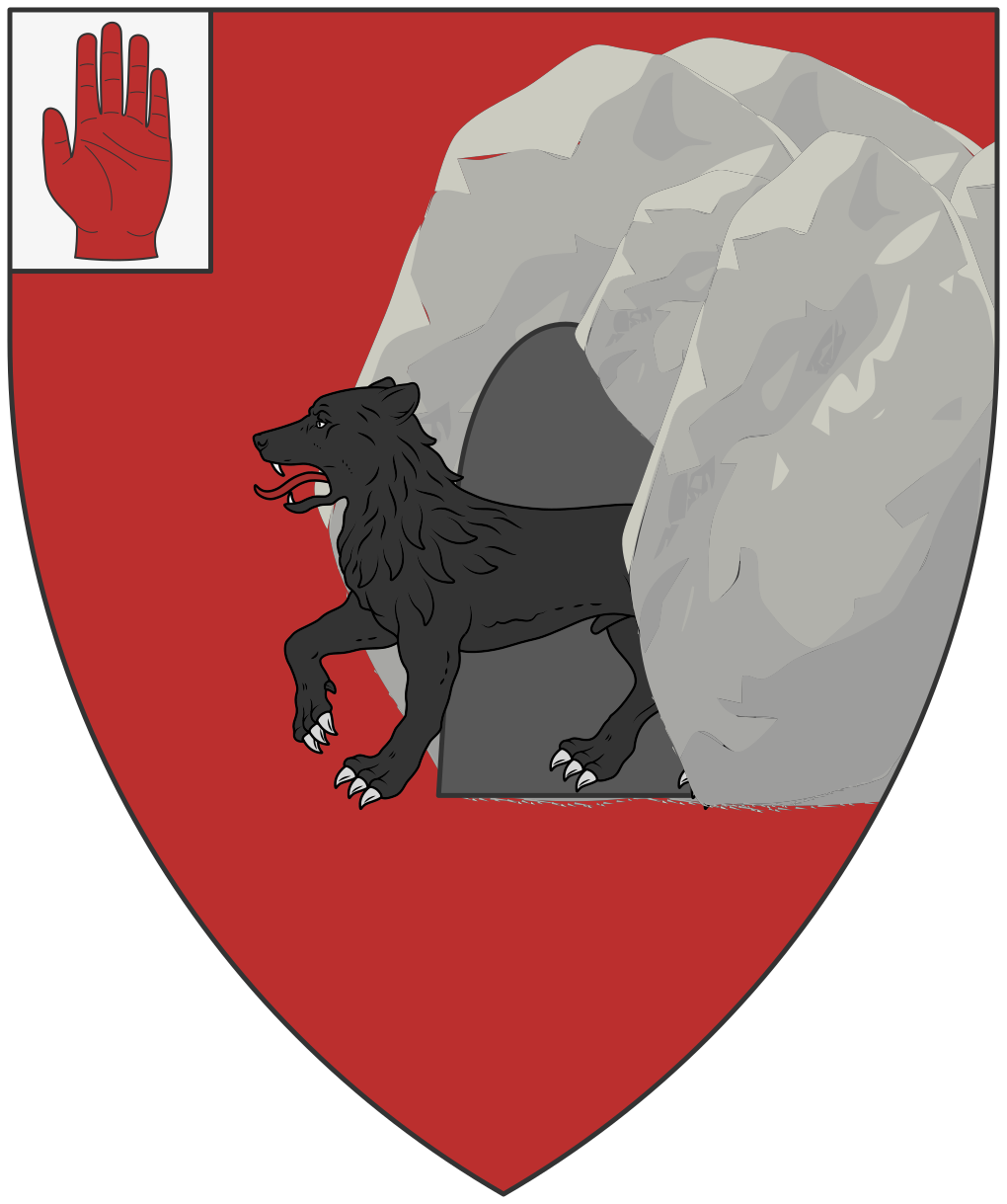
Escutcheon of the Williams baronets of Clapton

The Williams baronetcy, of Clapton in the County of Northampton, was created in the Baronetage of Great Britain on 4 April 1747 for Hutchins Williams, son of William Peere Williams.

The 2nd Baronet represented New Shoreham in the House of Commons. The title became extinct on the death of the 3rd Baronet in 1784.

== Williams baronets, of Clapton (1747) ==
- Sir Hutchins Williams, 1st Baronet (c.1700–1758)
- Sir William Peere Williams, 2nd Baronet (c.1730–1761)
- Sir Booth Williams, 3rd Baronet (c.1735–1784)

== Notes ==
Baronetage of Great Britain
Preceded by Fetherstonhaugh baronets	Williams baronets of Clapton; 4 April 1747	Succeeded by Lawrence baronets

}
