= Matthew Decker =

British businessman and politician (1679–1749)

Sir Matthew Decker, portrait by Theodorus Netscher (1661-1728), Fitzwilliam Museum

Arms of Decker: Argent, a demi-buck gules between his forelegs an arrow erected in pale or, as confirmed in 1716 to Sir Matthew Decker, 1st Baronet, by Sir John Vanbrugh, Clarenceaux King of Arms, as used by his ancestors in Holland

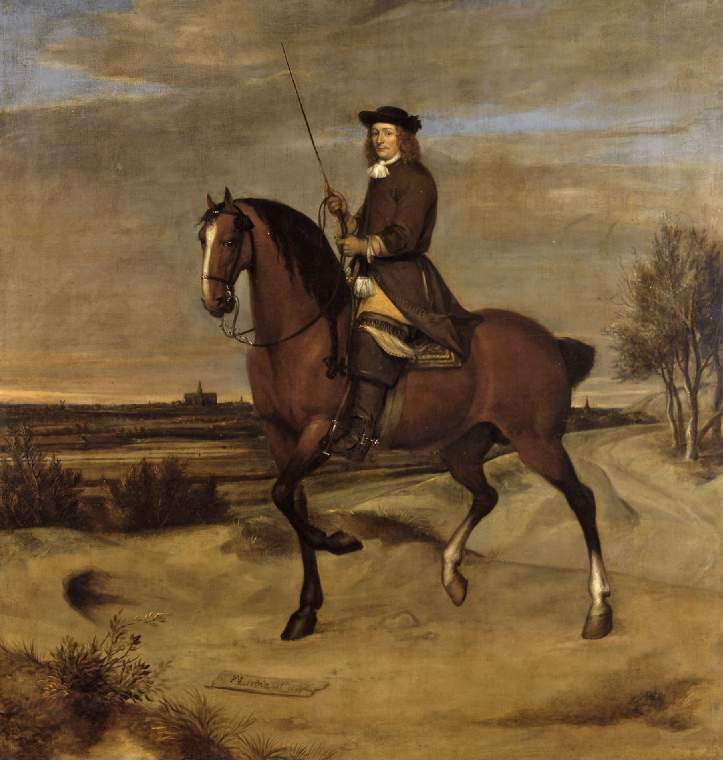
Dirck Decker, father of Sir Matthew, with the Grote Kerk, Haarlem in the background. 1671 portrait by Jan Andrea Lievens, Fitzwilliam Museum. Great grandfather of the founder of the Fitzwilliam Museum

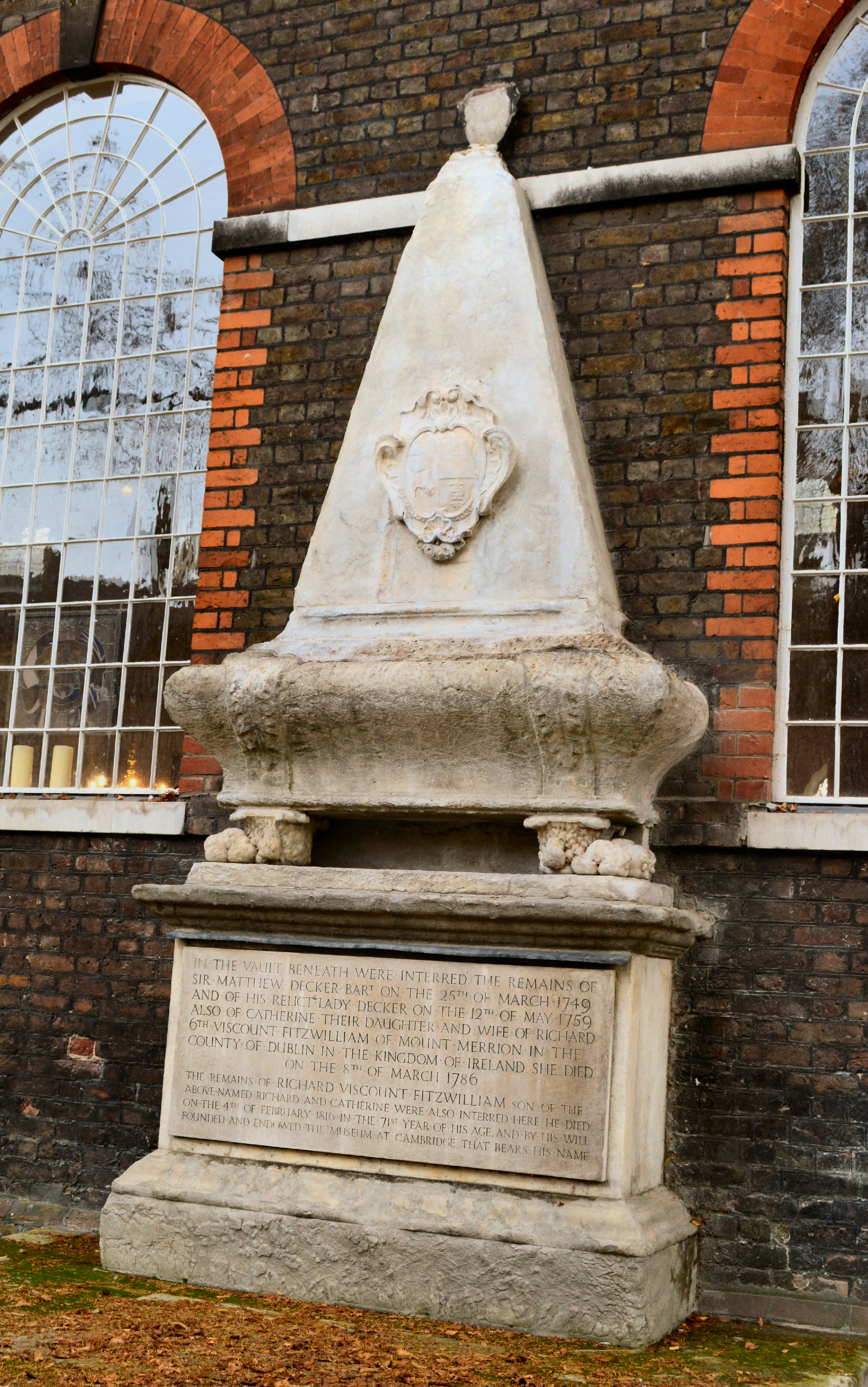
Monument to Sir Matthew Decker, 1st Baronet, Church of St Mary Magdalene, Richmond, showing the arms of Decker impaling Watkins Azure, a fess vair between three leopard's faces jessant-de-lys or

Sir Matthew Decker, 1st Baronet (1679 – 18 March 1749) (Dutch: Mattijs Decker) of Richmond Green in Surrey, was a Dutch-born English merchant and economist who served as a Member of Parliament for Bishop's Castle in Shropshire from 1719 to 1722. He was a governor of the South Sea Company from 1711 to 1712, and a Director of the East India Company from 1713 to 1743. His published works show him as "such a strong supporter of the doctrine of free trade as to rank as one of the most important forerunners of Adam Smith", proposed amongst other measures, to abolish customs duties and replace them with a tax upon houses, to abolish the duty on tea replacing it with a licence duty on households wishing to consume it, and to repeal import duties and bounties in general. At his house in Richmond, he amassed a large collection of art, including many Dutch paintings, which later formed the core of the collection of the Fitzwilliam Museum, founded by his grandson. He was a pioneer in the growing of exotic fruits in England, including pineapple and lemon, in his heated greenhouses at Richmond.

== Origins ==
Decker was born in 1679 in Amsterdam, the son of Dirck Decker of the City of Amsterdam, by his wife Katherina. Dirck was born in 1642/4 probably at Bloemendaal, near Haarlem, a son of Cornelius Decker, a linen bleacher at Bloemendaal. The portrait at the FitzWilliam of Dirck on horseback in sand dunes with the Grote Kerk, Haarlem in the background may also be a view of Cornelius's bleaching-grounds.

The herald Sir John Vanburgh in his 1716 confirmation of arms to Sir Matthew stated that Dirck was a "son of Cornelius Decker of Haerlem in the Province of Holland, and other his ancestors who were natives of Flanders (and retired from thence into Holland on account of their religion, during the Cruel Persecution of the Duke of Alva Governour of the Spanish Netherlands, in ye time of Queen Elizabeth)".

== Career ==
He was educated in Amsterdam and received his commercial education there under burgomaster Velters. By 1702, aged 23, he had moved to the City of London where he established himself as a merchant specialising in linen. He was remarkably successful in his business life, gaining great wealth and honours. By 1710 he had become a major player in Anglo-Dutch commerce and had become the London correspondent for several Dutch banks, most notably Pels of Amsterdam. He was one of the original directors of the South Sea Company from 1711 to 1712 and subscribed £49,271 for shares. However, after that year his interest turned instead to East India Company, of which he became a director 1713, remaining until 1743. On 20 July 1716 he was created a baronet, "of the City of London", by King George I.

In 1719 he was one of the original backers of the Royal Academy of Music, establishing a London opera company which commissioned numerous works from Handel, Bononcini and others.

He had worked for James Brydges (later 1st Duke of Chandos) when the latter was in the Low Countries serving as Paymaster of the Forces during the War of the Spanish Succession and in 1719 with his help was returned unopposed as a Member of Parliament for Bishop's Castle in Shropshire at a by-election on 17 December 1719. Chandos was a client of his for whom he bought paintings and tapestries in the Netherlands. In 1720 Decker was Assistant of the Royal African Company and became Deputy Governor of the East India Company, until 1721. He told Chandos in 1721 that he had had enough of Parliament, and did not stand in the 1722 general election.

Following the disaster of the South Sea Bubble, in the management of which company he had had no involvement for several years, in December 1720 Decker delivered a "gererous speech" in the Court of Directors of the East India Company in support of Walpole's proposed scheme for restoring public credit, namely of "ingrafting" 9 million South Sea stock into the Bank of England and a similar amount into the East India Company, of which he was then a director. Decker's speech was reported contemporaneously as follows:

Sir Matthew Decker spoke with a true publick spirit, to the great reproach of such as set their hearts entirely on revenge, to the destruction of the South Sea directors, and seem'd careless in the consideration of the main point, the restoring credit. At first truly, (said Sir Matthew) I did not like this proposal but when I saw the ruin that was spread over our country, when I considered the distresses of the poor people when the nation and the parliament called upon us to support the public credit, I thought it would become no man to vote against it. I would, I declare, part with all my property in the Company, and I think I have as much as any body here: Nay, with all I have, to a bare necessary subsistence, to deliver the Kingdom from the miseries that have befallen it".

Decker was the Governor of the East India Company from 1725 to 1726 and was its chairman in 1725. He was selected to be Sheriff of Surrey in 1729. Also in 1729, he was Deputy Governor of the East India Company again, Governor from 1730 to 1733 and Chairman from 1730 to 1732.

== Residence in Richmond ==
His mansion house and estate stood on the site of today's "Pembroke Villas" 5 pairs of large semi-detached Victorian villas on the north-western side of Richmond Green, adjacent to the site of Richmond Palace, demolished during the Commonwealth. The house was first built by Sir Charles Hedges (died 1714), Secretary of State to Queen Anne, from whom Decker acquired it. It later became the property of Decker's grandson Richard FitzWilliam, 7th Viscount FitzWilliam (1745-1816) who named it "FitzWilliam House" and there formed his famous art collection and by his will founded the Fitzwilliam Museum in Cambridge. The latter's heir was his cousin George Herbert, 11th Earl of Pembroke (1759-1827), who renamed the house "Pembroke House". It was demolished in 1840. John Macky in his Journey through England (1722 to 1723), described the Decker estate at Richmond as follows:

The longest, largest, and highest Hedge of Holly I ever saw, is in this garden, with several other Hedges of Ever-Greens, Visto's cut through Woods, Grotto's with Fountains, a fine Canal running up from the River. His Duckery, which is an oval Pond brick'd round, and his pretty Summer-House by it to drink a Bottle, his Stove-Houses, which are always kept in an equal heat for his Citrons, and other Indian Plants, with Gardeners brought from foreign Countries to manage them, are very curious and entertaining. The house is also very large a-la-modern, and neatly furnished after the Dutch way.

=== Pineapple pioneer ===
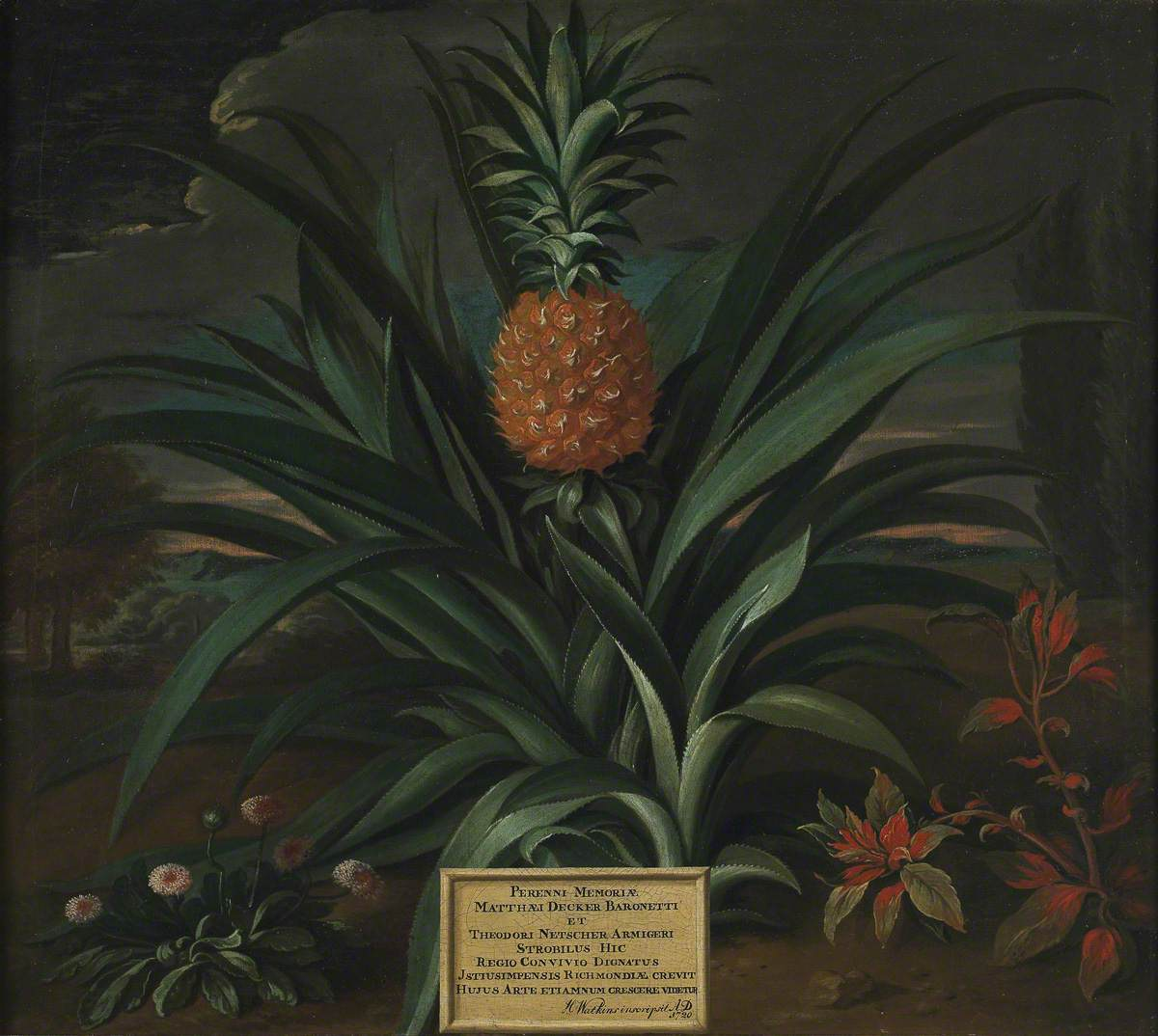
1720 painting of Sir Matthew Decker's prized English-ripened pineapple, by Theodorus Netscher (1661-1728), FitzWilliam Museum

A 1720 painting of Sir Matthew Decker's prize English-ripened pineapple, by Theodorus Netscher (1661-1728), survives in the FitzWilliam Museum, on which is inscribed in Latin: "To the perpetual memory of Matthew Decker, Baronet, and Theodore Netscher, Gentleman. This pineapple, deemed worthy of the royal table, grew at Richmond at the cost of the former, and still seems to grow by the art of the latter. H(enry) Watkins (Decker's brother-in-law) set up this inscription, A.D. 1720". This appears to indicate that Decker served a pineapple to King George I.

Richard Bradley in his General treatise of husbandry and gardening for the month of July (1723) described the pineapple enterprise on the estate as follows:

Tis not long since I was Eye-witness to several fruited Pine Apples at Sir Matthew Decker's, at Richmond, about Forty in number; some ripening, and others in a promising condition; the least of which Fruit was above four Inches long, and some were as large as any I have seen brought from the West-Indies: I measured one near seven inches long in pure fruit, and near thirteen Inches about… I proceed to give an Account of the method now practis'd at Sir Matthew Decker's at Richmond, for the production of this excellent Fruit, which Mr Henry Telende his judicious Gardener has render'd so easy and intelligible, that I hope to see the Ananas flourish for the future in many of our English Gardens, to see the honour of the Artist, and the Satisfaction and Pleasure of those who can afford to eat them.

In 2019 The Fitzwilliam Museum stated: "Pineapples have long welcomed visitors to the Fitzwilliam Museum. Spiky green railings bookended with life-size gilded pineapples adorn the museum's balustrade...In recognition of its unique place in pineapple history, the Fitzwilliam Museum commissioned Bompas & Parr to create a giant 'Architectonic Pineapple' to grace its front lawn. And in February 2020, the curators will further explore the fruit's journey from luxury to every day food in a conference dedicated to pineapples".

== Marriage and children ==
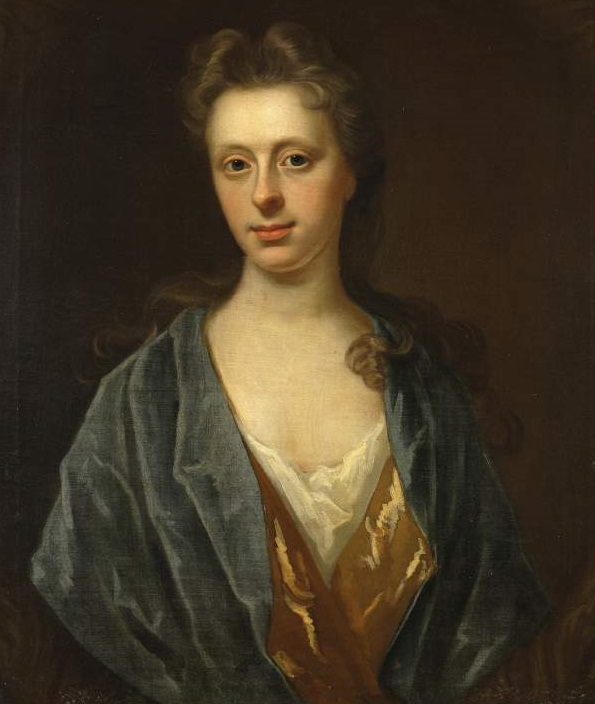
left: Henrietta Watkins, wife of Sir Matthew Decker, portrait c.1715, Fitzwilliam Museum; right: Arms of Watkins: Azure, a fess vair between three leopard's faces jessant-de-lys or as seen impaled by Decker on Chinese porcelain plates now in the British Museum and on the Decker monument at St Mary Magdalene, Richmond

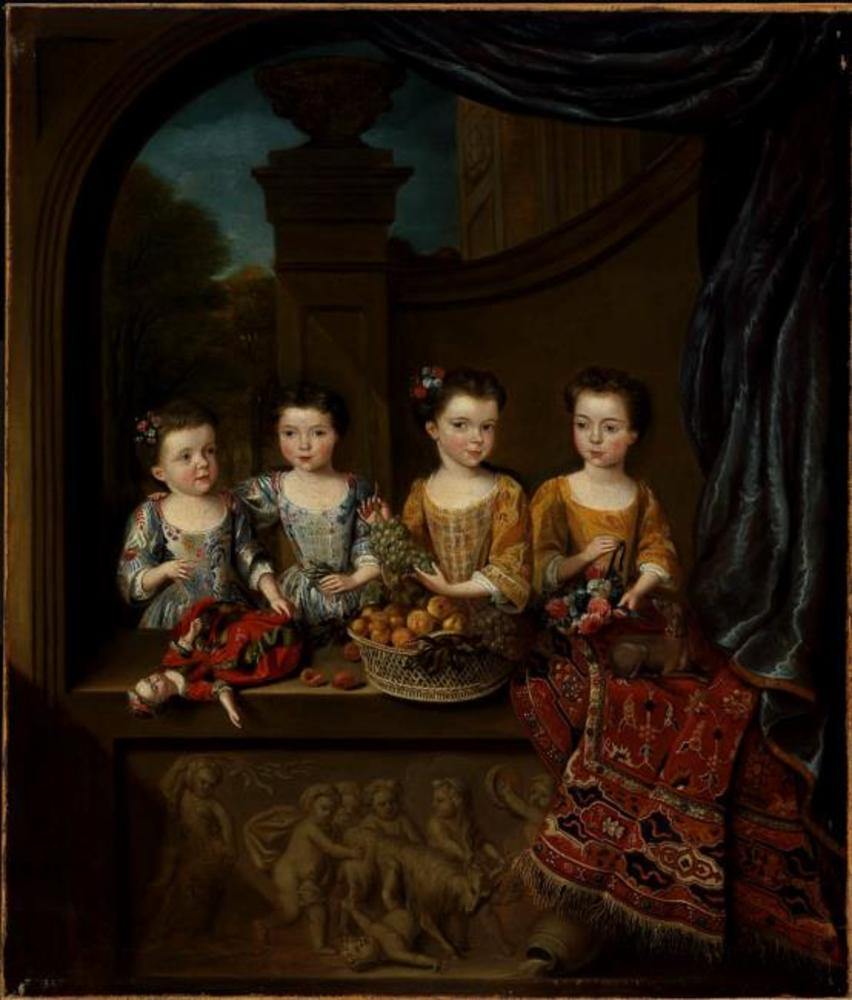
Daughters of Sir Matthew Decker; 1718 portrait by Jan de Meyer, Fitzwilliam Museum

At some time before 1711 he married Henrietta Watkins, one of the 16 children of Rev. Richard Watkins (1627-1709), Rector of Whichford in Warwickshire (where survives his mural monument) by his wife Elizabeth Hyckes (1638-1709) whose separate mural monument survives in Whichford Church. Henrietta's brother (through whom Sir Matthew met his future wife) was Henry Watkins (1666-1727) an army administrator and diplomat who served briefly as a Member of Parliament for Brackley in Northamptonshire, and who spent much time in the Low Countries and The Hague, described as a "dedicated servant and admirer" of the Duke of Marlborough. By his wife he had issue one son (who died young) and three daughters as follows:

- A son who died young;
- Catherine Decker (died 1786), who married Richard FitzWilliam, 6th Viscount FitzWilliam, and had issue at least seven children including Richard FitzWilliam, 7th Viscount FitzWilliam (1745-1816) of Mount Merrion, Dublin, Ireland, who inherited the Decker mansion and art collection at Richmond, but died without legitimate issue; by his will founded the Fitzwilliam Museum in Cambridge.
- Henrietta Anne Decker (died 1747), who married John Talbot, a judge and MP, but had no issue.
- Mary Decker, wife of William Croftes of West Harling in Norfolk and of Little Saxham in Suffolk and mother of Richard Croftes (1740-1783), MP.

== Publications ==
Decker's fame as a writer on trade rests on two tracts. The first, Serious considerations on the several high duties which the Nation in general, as well as Trade in particular, labours under, with a proposal for preventing the removal of goods, discharging the trader from any search, and raising all the Publick Supplies by one single Tax (1743; name affixed to 7th edition, 1756), proposed to do away with customs duties and substitute a tax upon houses. He also suggested taking the duty off tea and putting instead a licence duty on households wishing to consume it. The second, an Essay on the Causes of the Decline of the Foreign Trade, consequently of the value of the lands in Britain, and on the means to restore both (1744), has been attributed to W. Richardson, but internal evidence is strongly in favour of Decker's authorship. He advocates the licence plan in an extended form; urges the repeal of import duties and the abolition of bounties, and, in general, shows himself such a strong supporter of the doctrine of free trade as to rank as one of the most important thinkers in the early development of economic science.

== Death and legacy ==
Decker died on 18 March 1749, without a surviving male heir and the baronetcy became extinct. He was buried at St Mary Magdalene, Richmond, where survives his monument (above a vault) against the external wall of the church, in the form of a broad-based obelisk (on which is affixed a baroque escutcheon displaying a relief of the arms of Decker impaling Watkins) topped by an urn, atop an antique Roman sarcophagus standing on a chest tomb base. The tomb was sculpted by Peter Scheemakers in 1759.

A modern inscription on a tablet of stone superimposed on the base of the monument is as follows:

In the vault beneath were interred the remains of Sir Matthew Decker Bart. on the 25th of March 1749 and of his relict Lady Decker on the 12th of May 1759. Also of Catherine their daughter and wife of Richard 6th Viscount FitzWilliam of Mount Merrion in the County of Dublin in the Kingdom of Ireland. She died on the 8th of March 1786. The remains of Richard Viscount FitzWilliam son of the above-named Richard and Catherine were also interred here. He died on the 4th of February 1816 in the 71st year of his age and by his will founded and endowed the museum at Cambridge that bears his name

His fortune and estates passed to his surviving daughter Catherine, and then to her son Richard FitzWilliam, 7th Viscount FitzWilliam.

Parliament of Great Britain
Preceded by Richard Harnage; Charles Mason	Member of Parliament for Bishop's Castle; 1719–1722; With: Charles Mason	Succeeded by William Peere Williams; Bowater Vernon
Honorary titles
Preceded by John Wall	High Sheriff of Surrey; 1728–1729	Succeeded by Samuel Kent
Baronetage of Great Britain
New creation	Baronet (of London); 1716–1749	Extinct
Preceded by D'Aeth baronets	Decker baronets of London; 20 July 1716	Succeeded by Milner baronets
