= John Plumptre (elder) =

British Whig politician

John Plumptre (c. 1680 – 29 September 1751), of Plumptre House, Nottingham, was a British Whig politician who sat in the English and British House of Commons between 1706 and 1751.

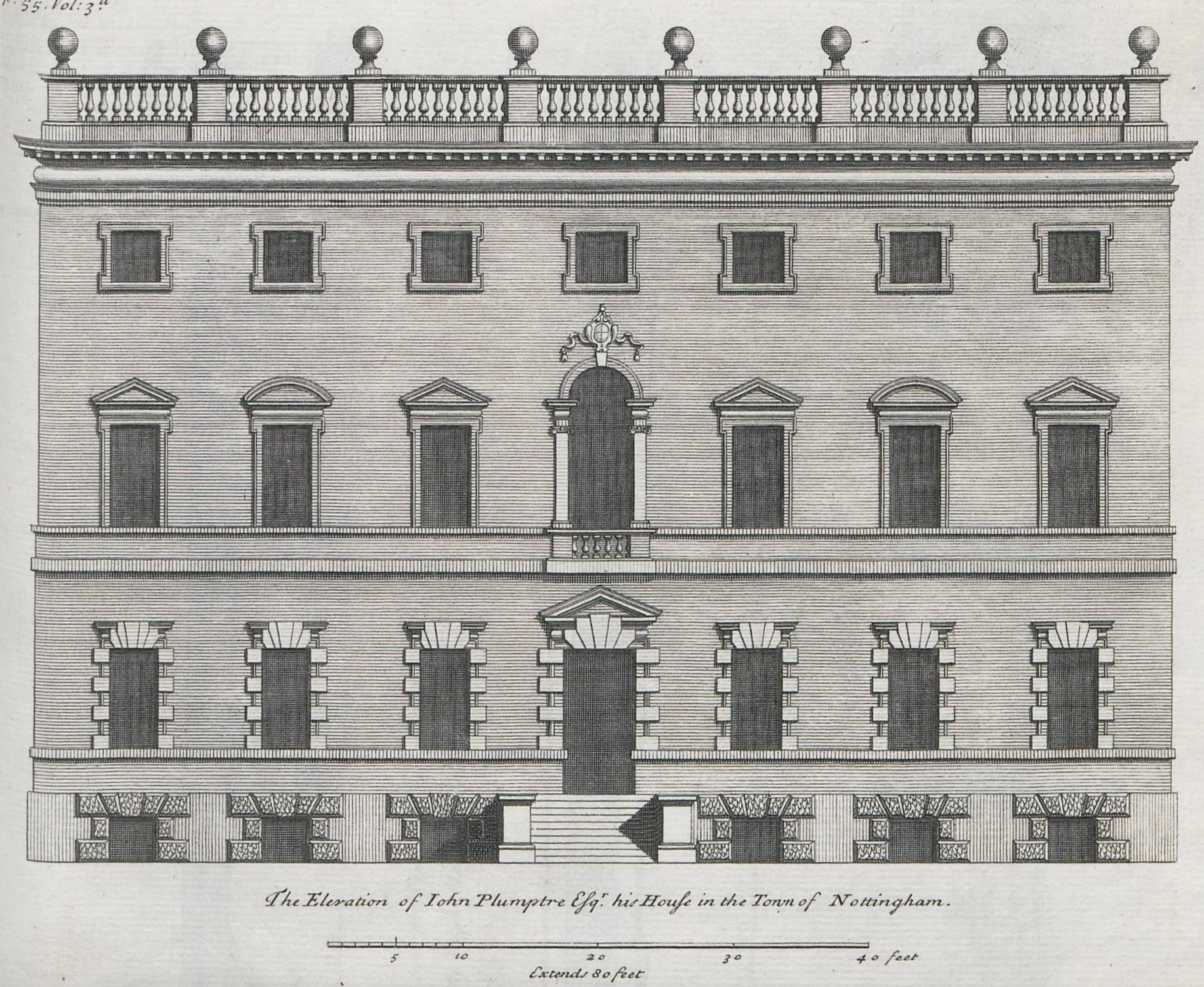
Plumptre House, Nottingham

Plumtre was baptized on 16 January 1680, the eldest son of Henry Plumptre and his second wife Joyce Sacheverell, daughter of Henry Sacheverell of Barton, Nottinghamshire. In 1693, he succeeded his father to Plumptre House, Nottingham. He was admitted at the Middle Temple on 1 July 1696, and at Queens' College, Cambridge on 5 May 1697. He was appointed Guardian of Plumptre Hospital in 1704 and a freeman of Nottingham in 1705. He was a trustee of the King Street Chapel.

Plumtre was returned unopposed as Member of Parliament (MP) for Nottingham at a by-election on 23 December 1706. At the 1708 British general election, he was returned as Whig MP at the top of the poll in a contest at Nottingham. He voted for the naturalization of the Palatines in 1709 and for the impeachment of Henry Sacheverell in 1710.

Supported by the Duke of Newcastle, he was returned again at the top of the poll at the 1710 British general election. He acted as a teller for the Whigs and voted against the administration on the motion for 'No Peace Without Spain' on 7 December 1711. He was noted as a Whig who voted against the French commerce bill on 18 June 1713. Following the death of the Duke of Newcastle, Plumptre's interest at Nottingham was reduced and he was defeated at the 1713 British general election.

Plumtre was returned again as Whig MP for Nottingham at the 1715 British general election and was appointed Commissioner for standing army debts in 1715 and the Treasurer of the Ordnance in 1720 which he held for the rest of his life. He was returned again as Whig MP for Nottingham at the 1722 British general election. At the 1727 British general election, he was returned as MP for Bishop's Castle. At the 1734 general election he was returned again as MP for Nottingham. He was returned as MP for St Ives at the 1747 British general election.

Plumtre lived at Plumptre House, which he engaged Colen Campbell to redesign between 1724 and 1730. In his later life, he conducted repairs on Plumptre Hospital, owned by his family, which was originally built in 1392.

Plumtre died in 1751 and was buried at St Mary, Nottingham. He had married Annabella, the daughter of Sir Francis Molyneux, 4th Baronet, and his wife, Diana, the sister of Scrope Howe, 1st Viscount Howe and had seven sons and two daughters. Plumptre House passed to his eldest son, John.

Parliament of England
Preceded by William Pierrepont; Robert Sacheverell	Member of Parliament for Nottingham; 1706–1707; With: Robert Sacheverell	Succeeded by Parliament of Great Britain
Parliament of Great Britain
Preceded by Parliament of England	Member of Parliament for Nottingham; 1707–1713; With: Robert Sacheverell 1707–1708, 1710–1713; Roby Sherwin 1708–1710	Succeeded by Robert Sacheverell; Borlase Warren
Preceded by Robert Sacheverell; Borlase Warren	Member of Parliament for Nottingham; 1715–1727; With: George Gregory	Succeeded by John Stanhope; Borlase Warren
Preceded by William Peere Williams; Charles Mason	Member of Parliament for Bishop's Castle; 1727–1734; With: Robert More	Succeeded by Robert More; Edward Kynaston
Preceded by John Stanhope; Borlase Warren	Member of Parliament for Nottingham; 1734–1747; With: Borlase Warren 1734–1747; Sir Charles Sedley 1747	Succeeded by Sir Charles Sedley; George Howe
Preceded by John Bristow; Lord Hobart	Member of Parliament for St Ives; 1747–1751; With: John Bristow	Succeeded by John Bristow; Samuel Stephens
Military offices
Preceded by Harry Mordaunt	Treasurer of the Ordnance; 1720–1751	Succeeded by Francis Gashry
