= Robert More (botanist) =

English academic and politician

Robert More FRS (May 1703–5 January 1780), of Linley Hall, near Bishop's Castle, Shropshire. was an English academic and politician who sat in the House of Commons between 1727 and 1761. He was also a noted amateur botanist.

== Early life ==
More was the son of Robert More, (formerly a London merchant), and his second wife Sarah Walcot, daughter of John Walcot of Walcot, Shropshire. His father was the third son of the Parliamentarian Samuel More. More was admitted to Queens' College, Cambridge in 1721, and matriculated there in 1723. He graduated B.A. in 1725, M.A. in 1728, and became a Fellow. He was elected a Fellow of the Royal Society in 1729.

== Career and travels ==
More was returned on his own interest as Whig Member of Parliament for Bishop's Castle, a seat his great grandfather Richard More had represented in the Short and Long Parliaments, in a contest at the 1727 British general election. He usually voted with the Administration and opposed a bill to limit the number of placemen in parliament. His nephew John Walcot, who had acquired the manor of Bishop's Castle and was Tory MP for Shropshire in the same parliament, voted for the Opposition and was stirred up by his colleagues to give grief to his uncle in the run-up to the 1734 British general election. More was returned unopposed at that election, but decided not to stand in 1741. He was mayor of Shrewsbury in 1737.

Out of Parliament, More started building Linley Hall in 1742 from designs by Henry Joynes, who was clerk of the works to John Vanbrugh at Blenheim Palace. Later, he travelled widely in Europe. In 1749 he set out for Portugal, and in October was at Madrid where he became intimate with Benjamin Keene and Spanish ministers, and promoted administrative reform. He spent most of 1750 in Italy and returned to England towards the end of the year via Vienna and Leipzig. He married Ellen Wilson, daughter of Thomas Wilson of Trevallyn, Denbighshire in 1750. In 1751 he travelled to Scandinavia, Russia, and northern Germany, before returning in September.

On 25 October 1753, More was invited, by a group of Protestant Dissenters and burgesses of Shrewsbury, to become a candidate at the forthcoming general election. He was adopted the following day, and with the support of local Whigs and Tories was returned unopposed as Member of Parliament for Shrewsbury at the 1754 British general election. He made two speeches in the Parliament - on the motion to increase the judges’ salaries on 16 June 1758, and when the House was returning thanks to Speaker Onslow on 18 March 1761. He decided not to stand in 1761.

== Later life and legacy ==
An enthusiastic botanist, More was a friend of Linnæus, He married as his second wife Catherine More, daughter of Thomas More of Millichope on 8 February 1768. He died on 5 January 1780 aged 76, leaving two sons by his first wife. The plant genus Moraea was named in More's honour.

His great-grandson, Robert Jasper More represented Ludlow and Shropshire South from 1885 to 1903, like More and his great-grandfather representing Shropshire seats in Parliament.

== Notes ==
Attribution

This article incorporates text from a publication now in the public domain: Lee, Sidney, ed. (1894). "More, Samuel". Dictionary of National Biography. Vol. 38. London: Smith, Elder & Co.

Parliament of Great Britain
Preceded by William Peere Williams; Charles Mason	Member of Parliament for Bishop's Castle; 1727 – 1741; With: John Plumptre 1727–34; Edward Kynaston 1734–41	Succeeded by Marquess of Carnarvon; Andrew Hill
Preceded by Sir Richard Corbet, Bt; Thomas Hill	Member of Parliament for Shrewsbury; 1754 – 1761; With: Thomas Hill	Succeeded by Robert Clive; Thomas Hill
