= William Oakeley =

English landowner and politician

William Oakeley (March 1635 – 1695) was an English landowner and politician who sat in the House of Commons at various times between 1659 and 1695.

Oakeley was the eldest surviving son of Richard Oakeley of Oakeley, Shropshire and his wife Mary Combes, daughter of Edward Combes of Fetter Lane, London. His father was MP for Bishops Castle in 1624, and acted as a royalist commissioner during the Civil War, which resulted in a fine of £460 for his delinquency. Oakeley attended Balliol College, Oxford and Middle Temple in 1651. He succeeded to property in Shropshire, Montgomeryshire and Oxfordshire on the death of his father in 1653. In 1659, he was elected Member of Parliament for Bishop's Castle for the Third Protectorate Parliament.

Oakeley was commissioner for assessment for Shropshire from January 1660 to 1680. In March 1660 he was commissioner for militia for Shropshire and North Wales and became J.P. for Shropshire and Montgomeryshire until 1687. Although he was appointed Sheriff of Shropshire in March 1660, he was not prevented from taking his seat in April 1660 when he was elected MP for Bishop's Castle again in the Convention Parliament. He was commissioner for assessment for Montgomeryshire from September 1660 to 1663. He was proposed for the order of Knight of the Royal Oak with an annual income of £800. He became a freeman of Ludlow in 1661; In 1661 he was re-elected MP for Bishop's Castle in the Cavalier Parliament. He was commissioner for loyal and indigent officers in 1662, commissioner for corporations for Shropshire from 1662 to 1663 and commissioner for assessment for Oxfordshire from 1663 to 1680. From 1673 to 1680 he was commissioner for assessment for Montgomeryshire and was commissioner for recusants in 1675, In March 1679 he was re-elected MP for Bishop's Castle for the First Exclusion Parliament. He was a captain of the infantry militia by 1681 and was a major in the militia from about 1683 to 1686. He was commissioner for assessment for Shropshire and Oxfordshire from 1689 to 1690 and was reinstated as J.P. for Shropshire and Montgomeryshire from 1689 until his death. In 1690 he was elected MP for Bishop's Castle again.

Oakeley died at the age of about 59 and was buried at Bishop's Castle on 31 January 1695.

Oakeley married firstly under settlement dated 13 November 1663, Mary Waring daughter of Walter Waring of Owlbury, Lydham, Shropshire, and had a daughter. She died in 1680 and was buried on 27 September, Oakeley married again on 24 March 1681, Barbara Walcot, daughter of John Walcot of Walcot, Shropshire and had five sons and three daughters.

Parliament of England
Preceded by Not represented in Second Protectorate Parliament	Member of Parliament for Bishop's Castle; 1659; With: Samuel More	Succeeded by
Preceded by	Member of Parliament for Bishop's Castle; 1660–1679; With: Edmund Waring	Succeeded by Richard Scriven; Edmund Waring
Preceded by Richard More; Walter Waring	Member of Parliament for Bishop's Castle; 1690–1695; With: Richard Mason; Walter Waring	Succeeded by Richard More; Walter Waring
