= Richard Oakeley =

Richard Oakeley (died 1653) was an English landowner and politician who sat in the House of Commons in 1624. He supported the Royalist cause in the English Civil War.

Oakeley was of Oakeley, Shropshire and also held property in Montgomeryshire and Oxfordshire. In 1624, he was elected Member of Parliament for Bishop's Castle in the Happy Parliament. He was a Royalist commissioner during the Civil War, and was fined of £460 for his delinquency.

Oakeley died in 1653.

Oakeley married Mary Combes, daughter of Edward Combes of Fetter Lane, London. Their son William was also MP for Bishops Castle.

Parliament of England
Preceded by Francis Roberts; Gilbert Cornwall	Member of Parliament for Bishop's Castle; 1624; With: Sir Robert Howard	Succeeded by William Oakley; Edward Waring
