= George Gregory (Whig politician) =

English Whig politician

George Gregory (1670–1746) of Nottingham was an English Whig politician who sat in the English and British House of Commons between 1701 and 1746.

== Early life ==
Gregory was the eldest son of George Gregory of Nottingham and Lenton and his wife Susanna Lister, daughter of Sir Martin Lister of Thorpe Arnold, Leicestershire. He was educated at Nottingham under Mr. Cudworth and was admitted at St John’s College, Cambridge on 3 May 1688. He married Susanna Williams, the daughter and heiress of William Williams of Rempstone Hall, Nottinghamshire by on 26 December 1693, and succeeded his father in 1694.

== Career ==
Gregory was appointed High Sheriff of Nottinghamshire for 1694 as his father had been previously. He was involved in local administration, and was appointed a deputy-lieutenant in September 1694. In 1695, he voted for both Whig candidates for Nottinghamshire. He stood for Nottingham in a by-election in 1699 but was unsuccessful, and his petition was rejected. He was elected Member of Parliament (MP) for Nottingham, in the first English general election of 1701 and was appointed to a committee to draft the Nottingham Workhouse bill before being unseated on petition on 10 June. In the second general election on 1701 he was unsuccessful but was returned unopposed for Nottingham at the 1702 English general election. He was defeated at the 1705 English general election and abandoned parliamentary ambitions while concentrating on local matters. He next stood for Nottingham at the 1713 British general election when he was defeated.

Gregory was returned as Whig MP for Nottingham at the 1715 British general election. He was Commissioner for forfeited estates from 1716 to 1725. He supported the Government in all recorded divisions, except on the repeal of the Occasional Conformity and Schism Acts in 1719, when he was absent. At the 1722 British general election he was returned as MP for Nottingham and appointed Storekeeper of the Ordnance in 1722 and held the post for the rest of his life. In 1727 he stood down as MP for Nottingham as part of a compromise, and was returned as MP for Boroughbridge by the Duke of Newcastle at the 1727 British general election. He was returned again as MP for Boroughbridge in 1734 and 1741.

== Death and legacy ==
Gregory was buried at St Mary's Nottingham on 10 April 1746. He and his wife had six sons of whom three predeceased him, and a daughter Susanna who also predeceased him. Of his surviving sons, William was a lawyer, Henry was a clergyman and George jnr inherited Rempstone Hall.

Parliament of England
| Preceded by William Pierrepont; Robert Sacheverell | Member of Parliament for Nottingham; Jan. 1701 – June 1701; With: William Pierrepont | Succeeded by William Pierrepont; Robert Sacheverell |
| Preceded by William Pierrepont; Robert Sacheverell | Member of Parliament for Nottingham; 1702–1705; With: William Pierrepont | Succeeded by William Pierrepont; Robert Sacheverell |
Parliament of Great Britain
| Preceded by Robert Sacheverell; Borlase Warren | Member of Parliament for Nottingham; 1715–1727; With: John Plumptre | Succeeded by John Stanhope; Borlase Warren |
| Preceded by James Tyrrell; Joseph Danvers | Member of Parliament for Boroughbridge; 1727–1746; With: James Tyrrell 1727–1742; William Murray 1742–1746 | Succeeded by William Murray; Earl of Dalkeith |
Political offices
| Preceded by Sir Thomas Wheate | Storekeeper of the Ordnance; 1722–1746 | Succeeded by Andrew Wilkinson |
Honorary titles
| Preceded by Thomas Newdigate | High Sheriff of Nottinghamshire; 1694 | Succeeded by John Clerkson |
