= Borlase Warren =

British Member of Parliament

Borlase Warren (1677 – 15 May 1747) was a British Member of Parliament.

He was the eldest son of Arthur Warren of Stapleford, Nottinghamshire and his wife Anne Borlase, heiress of Sir John Borlase, Bt after her brother John's death in 1689. Warren succeeded his father in 1697. On the death of his mother in 1703 he inherited the Stratton Audley estate.

He was appointed High Sheriff of Nottinghamshire for 1703–04 and for Oxfordshire for 1707–08. He was elected MP for Nottingham in 1713, sitting until 1715, and again from 1727 to 1747, having been defeated in the intervening elections.

He married Anne, the daughter of Sir John Harpur, Bt, with whom he had 7 sons and 7 daughters. His grandson Admiral Sir John Borlase Warren, 1st Baronet also served as MP for Nottingham.

Parliament of Great Britain
Preceded by John Plumptre; Robert Sacheverell	Member of Parliament for Nottingham; 1713–1715; With: Robert Sacheverell	Succeeded by John Plumptre; George Gregory
Preceded by John Plumptre; George Gregory	Member of Parliament for Nottingham; 1727–1747; With: John Stanhope 1727–1734; John Plumptre 1734–1747	Succeeded by John Plumptre; Sir Charles Sedley, Bt
