= Edmund Waring =

English landowner and politician

Edmund Waring (c 1638 - 1687) was an English landowner and politician who sat in the House of Commons between 1660 and 1687.

== Family ==
Waring was the son of Walter Waring of Owlbury and his wife Jane Robinson, daughter of Humphrey Robinson of The Lynches, Bishop's Castle, Shropshire. His father was a Royalist commissioner of array in the Civil War, and compounded with a fine of £511 in 1646. Waring was a student of Lincoln's Inn in 1656. He succeeded to the estates of his father in 1658.

== Political career ==
In 1660, Waring was elected Member of Parliament for Bishop's Castle in the Convention Parliament. He was a J.P. for Shropshire from July 1660 until his death, commissioner for assessment for Shropshire and Montgomeryshire from August 1660 to 1680, farmer of excise from September 1660 to 1662, and cornet of the Shropshire volunteer horse from about October 1660. He was one of those nominated for the order of Knight of the Royal Oak. In 1661 he was re-elected MP for Bishop's Castle for the Cavalier Parliament. He became a freeman of Ludlow in 1662, commissioner for corporations for Shropshire from 1662 to 1663 and J.P. for Montgomeryshire from 1662 until his death. He was commissioner for wine duties from 1670 to 1674 and commissioner for recusants in 1675. He was a common councilman, Bishop's Castle by 1679. In 1679 he was re-elected MP for Bishop's Castle in both elections. He was elected MP for Bishop's Castle again in 1685.

Waring died intestate at the age of about 48 and was buried at Bishop's Castle on 9 November 1687.

Waring married Mary by 1667 and had two sons. She died in 1676.

Parliament of England
Preceded by	Member of Parliament for Bishop's Castle; 1660–1681; With: William Oakeley 1660; Richard Scriven 1661–1681	Succeeded by Sir Richard Mason; Richard Moore
Preceded by Sir Richard Mason; Richard Moore	Member of Parliament for Bishop's Castle; 1685–1687; With: Francis Charlton	Succeeded by Richard Moore; Walter Waring
