= Sir Charles Sedley, 2nd Baronet =

British politician

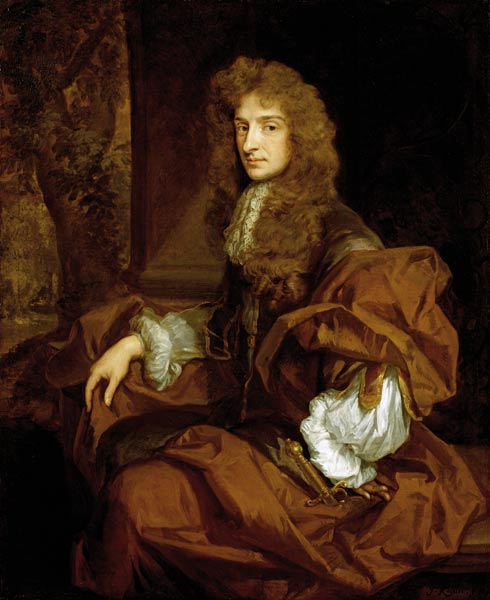
Sir Charles Sedley, 2nd Baronet

Sir Charles Sedley, 2nd Baronet (c. 1721 – 23 August 1778), was a British politician who sat in the House of Commons between 1747 and 1778.

== Early life ==
Sedley was the eldest son of Sir Charles Sedley, 1st Baronet, son of Sir Charles Sedley, illegitimate son of Sir Charles Sedley, 5th Baronet. His father inherited the Nuthall estate through marriage to Sedley's mother, Elizabeth, the daughter of William Frith, and co-heiress of Richard Slater.

He was educated at Westminster School and University College, Oxford, where he matriculated in 1739.

== Career ==
He succeeded his father in 1730, and sat as Member of Parliament for Nottingham from 1747 to 1754 and 1774 to 1778.

== Personal life ==
Sedley died unmarried in August 1778, when the baronetcy became extinct. He left his estate to an illegitimate daughter, Elizabeth Rebecca Anne Sedley (d. 1793), who married Henry Venables-Vernon, afterwards the 3rd Baron Vernon, on 4 February 1779.

=== Descendants ===
Through his daughter Elizabeth, he was posthumously a grandfather of George Venables-Vernon, 4th Baron Vernon (1779–1835), who married Frances Maria, only daughter of Admiral Sir John Borlase Warren. Sir Richard Vernon, Speaker of the House of Commons from 1425 to 1426, was an ancestor. He was educated at Eton College and Christ Church, Oxford. Together, they were the parents of George Venables-Vernon, 5th Baron Vernon.

Parliament of Great Britain
Preceded by Borlase Warren; John Plumptre	Member of Parliament for Nottingham; 1747–1754; With: John Plumptre 1747; The Viscount Howe 1747–1754	Succeeded by The Viscount Howe; Sir Willoughby Aston
Preceded by William Howe; John Plumptre	Member of Parliament for Nottingham; 1774–1778; With: William Howe	Succeeded by William Howe; Abel Smith
Baronetage of England
Preceded by Charles Sedley	Baronet (of Southfleet); 1730–1778	Extinct
