= George Brodrick, 3rd Viscount Midleton =

British nobleman

George Brodrick, 3rd Viscount Midleton (3 October 1730 – 22 August 1765) was a British nobleman.

== Origins ==
Brodrick was the first and only surviving son of Alan Brodrick, 2nd Viscount Midleton and Mary Capell, the second daughter of Algernon Capell, 2nd Earl of Essex. The Brodricks were an English family that had settled in Ireland in the mid-17th century. Brodrick's grandfather, the first Viscount, had risen to become Lord Chancellor of Ireland. King George stood sponsor at Brodrick's christening.

== Life and career ==
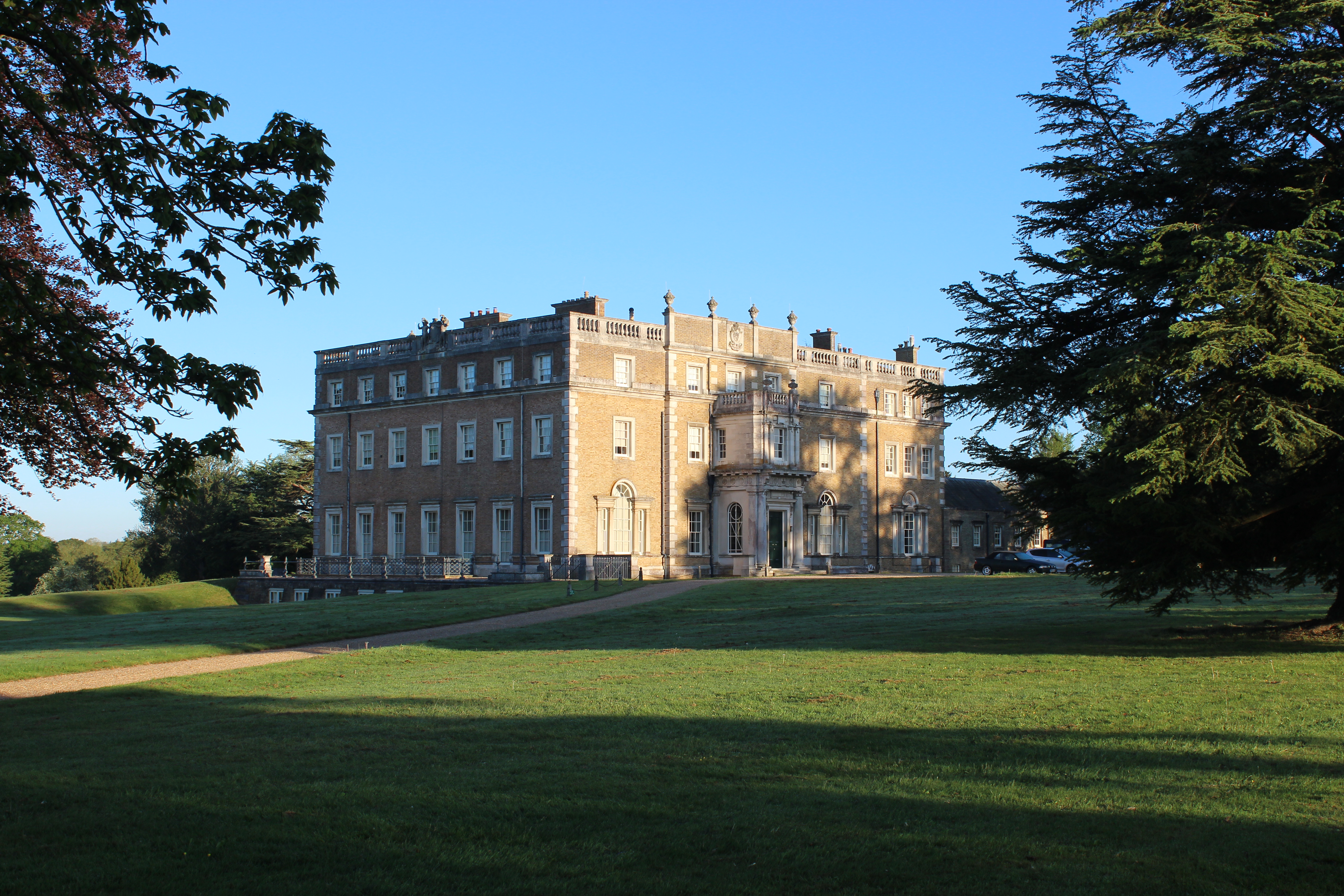
Peper Harow House

Brodrick was educated at Eton College between 1742 and 1745. He was a Whig and sat in the House of Commons as Member of Parliament for Ashburton between 1754 and 1761, and for Shoreham between 1761 and 1765.

In 1762 he commissioned Sir William Chambers to build a mansion on his estate at Peper Harow in Surrey. He died before it was complete and his son completed it once he came of age. The house is now a Grade I listed building.

He died of an abscess in the spleen on 22 August 1765 and was buried six days later at Wandsworth.

== Family ==
Brodrick married on 1 May 1752 Albinia, the daughter of the Hon Thomas Townshend by Albinia (daughter of John Selwyn of Matson, Gloucestershire). They had six sons:

- George Brodrick, 4th Viscount Midleton (1 November 1754 – 12 August 1836).
- Thomas Brodrick (17 April 1756 – 13 January 1795), Under-Secretary at the Home Department.
- Hon. Henry Brodrick (12 December 1758 – 16 June 1785), Captain and Lieutenant-Colonel in the 1st Regiment of Foot Guards.
- Charles Brodrick (3 May 1761 – 6 May 1822), Archbishop of Cashel.
- William Brodrick (14 February 1763 – 29 April 1819), MP for Whitchurch
- John Brodrick (3 November 1765 – 9 October 1842), a general and Governor of Martinique.

Peerage of Ireland
Preceded by Alan Brodrick	Viscount Midleton; 1747–1765	Succeeded by George Brodrick
Parliament of Great Britain
Preceded by John Harris; John Arscott	Member of Parliament for Ashburton; 1754–1761; With: John Harris	Succeeded by John Harris; Thomas Walpole
Preceded by Sir William Williams; Robert Bristow	Member of Parliament for New Shoreham; 1761–1765; With: Sir William Williams to December 1761; Lord Pollington from December 1761	Succeeded by Lord Pollington; Sir Samuel Cornish
