= Richard Bradley (botanist) =

English botanist and writer (1688–1732)

- Born: 1688; England
- Died: 5 November 1732 (aged 43–44); Cambridge, England
- Scientific career
- Fields: Botany
- Workplaces: University of Cambridge

Richard Bradley FRS (1688 – 5 November 1732) was an English naturalist specialising in botany. He published important works on ecology, horticulture, and natural history.

== Biography ==
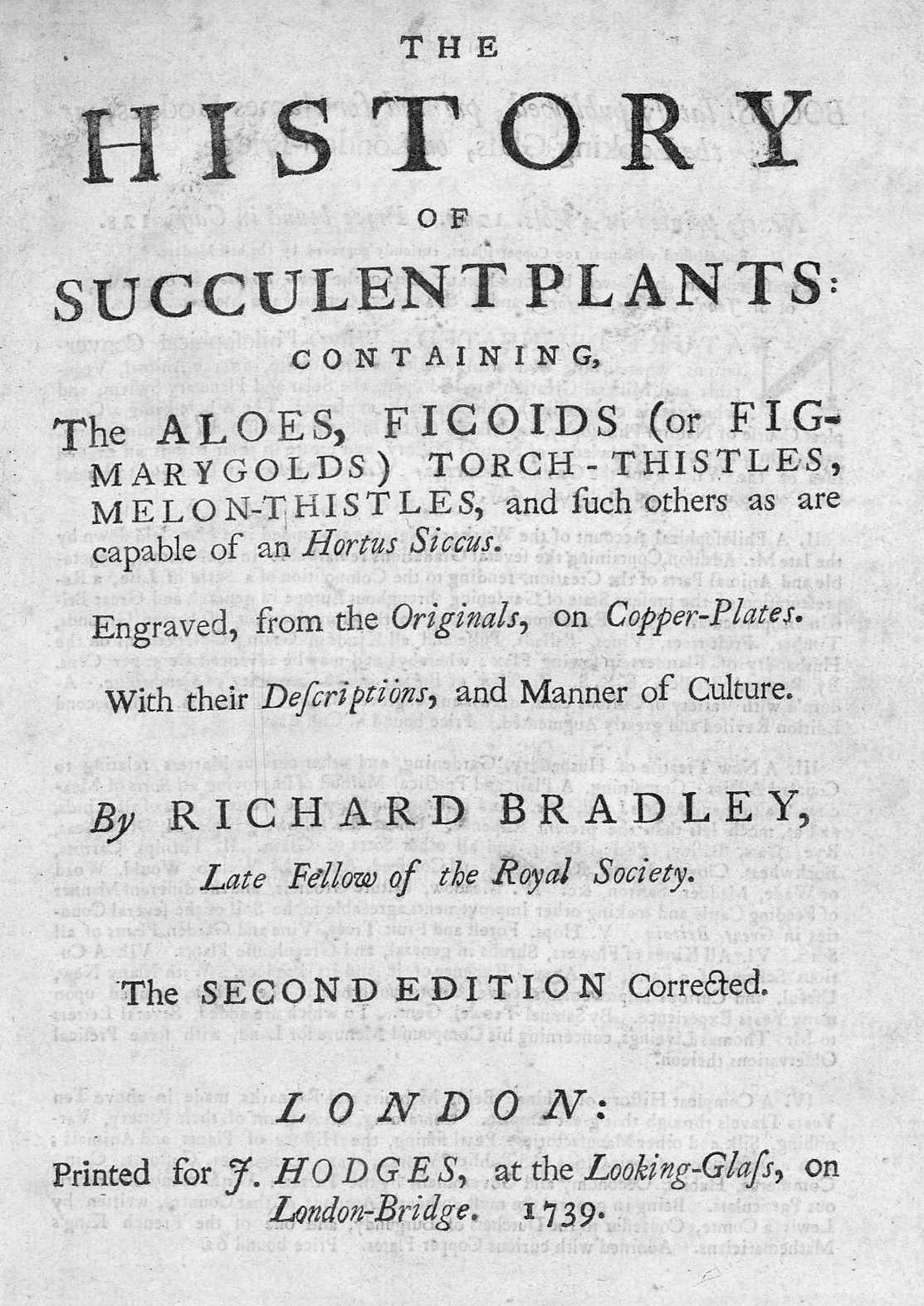
The History of succulent plants, 1739

Little is known about Bradley's childhood aside from an early interest in gardening and the fact that he lived in the vicinity of London, a city at the time with many amateur naturalists. Though Bradley lacked a university education, his first publication, Treatise of Succulent Plants, gained him traction with influential patrons like James Petiver and later, Hans Sloane. With their support, he was proposed and elected a Fellow of the Royal Society in 1712, at the age of 24.

In 1714, Bradley visited the Netherlands and took an interest in horticulture. He spent the next decade back in England writing treatises on topics related to this central interest, like weather, fertiliser, productivity, and plant hybridisation. In recognition of his work in the field and with the (thereafter unfulfilled) promise that he would found and fund a university botanical garden, the University of Cambridge named Bradley its first professor of botany in 1724, a position he would hold until his death. As Bradley was not a wealthy man in his later life, and as this was an unsalaried position, the newly minted academic continued to focus most of his efforts on making a living through publishing. According to his rival and successor, John Martyn, as well as his successor's son Thomas Martyn, Bradley did this at the expense of his students, whom he reportedly neglected to lecture to.

Bradley died penniless in 1732. It has been suggested that he may have lost his money in the financial crisis of 1720 - The South Sea Bubble.

== Career ==
Bradley made notable innovations and discoveries across a wide array of disciplines. For example, New Improvements of Planting and Gardening included directions for the making and use of a rudimentary kaleidoscope to aid in formal garden design and layout. He also wrote about cooking, and was the first to publish recipes in English for the then-exotic pineapple as the main ingredient. His friend Sir Matthew Decker was the first to grow pineapples on English soil in the 1710s. His History of Succulent plants was the seminal treatise on the topic, and his studies of tulips and auriculas helped further accurate theories of plant reproduction. Bradley was also a pioneer in the examining of fungal spore germination and the pollination of plants by insects. His publications additionally contained information on how to build and use greenhouses, early theories regarding agricultural productivity, and pond ecology.

Richard Bradley's most lasting work may be in the study of infectious disease. When many scientists were still holding fast to the ideals of mechanical philosophy, Bradley turned to empirical studies and experiments for his work. Though spread across a handful of his papers, when taken together, a unified, biological theory of infectious diseases spanning all life – from plants and animals to humans – emerges.

== Selected bibliography ==
Bradley was the prolific author of at least twenty-four original books and pamphlets; some of his major publications are listed below. Dates are for first editions.

- 1710: Treatise of Succulent Plants
- 1716–1727: History of Succulent Plants (appeared in five instalments). Second edition corrected (London, 1739)
- 1719–1720: New Improvements of Planting and Gardening
- 1721: A Philosophical Account of the Works of Nature
- 1721: The Plague at Marseilles Considered
- 1721–1723: A General Treatise of Husbandry and Gardening (appeared in fifteen issues and later collected into three volumes from 1721–1724)
- 1727: Ten Practical Discourses Concerning Earth and Water, Fire and Air, as They Relate to the Growth of Plants
- c.1727: The Country Housewife and Lady's Director (cookery)
- 1730: A Course of Lectures upon the Materia Medica, Ancient and Modern
