= Edward Kynaston (1709–1772) =

Edward Kynaston (6 October 1709 – 1772), of Garth and Bryngwyn, Montgomeryshire and Hardwick, Shropshire, was a British landowner and Tory politician who sat in the British House of Commons between 1734 and 1772.

Kynaston was the son of John Kynaston, MP, and his second wife Anne Harwood, daughter of Thomas Harwood of Tern. He was educated at Eton College in 1725, and was admitted at St John's College, Cambridge on 3 January 1726 and at Lincoln's Inn on 15 June 1726. He married Victoria Lloyd, daughter of Sir Charles Lloyd, 3rd Baronet, of Garth, Montgomeryshire. In 1733 he inherited the greater part of his father's personal property at the expense of his half-brother, Corbet Kynaston, whom he succeeded at Bryngwyn and Hardwick in 1740. He also succeeded his father in law at Garth.

At the 1734 British general election Kynaston was returned as a Tory Member of Parliament for Bishops Castle on the interest of John Walcot. He voted with the Opposition. He did not stand at the 1741 British general election but at the 1747 British general election he was brought in for Montgomeryshire by Sir Watkin Williams Wynn. He became a trustee for Wynn's estate, on his death in 1749. When in 1748 Lord Powis, succeeded to the estates of the Marquess of Powis, which carried significant electoral influence in Montgomeryshire, he did not try to dislodge Kynaston, who was a nephew of Powis's follower, Thomas Hill. Kynaston was used by both Powis and Hill in negotiations with the Shropshire Tories. Kynaston was Recorder of Welshpool from 1750 to 1762.

Kynaston was returned as Tory MP for Montgomeryshire in 1754 and 1761. He acted as teller on the Government side in the division on Dowdeswell's motion on the cider bill on 31 January 1764. He also helped the Government in election matters, and in trying to get his friends to attend over general warrants. He again acted as teller on 25 January and 27 February 1765. On 9 May 1765 during the crisis over the Regency bill, he seconded Morton's motion to include the Princess Dowager among those capable of being appointed Regents, although he said nothing at all in support of it. He adhered to the Grenvilles after their dismissal from office. On 18 December he voted for the motion calling for American papers and on 22 February 1766 he voted against the repeal of the Stamp Act. He voted against the Chatham Administration over the land tax on 27 February 1767. He was returned again at the 1768 British general election. He left Grenville and voted with Administration over John Wilkes and the Middlesex election on 3 February and 8 May 1769. He hardly ever spoke in debate.

Kynaston died without issue on 18 May 1772.

Parliament of Great Britain
Preceded by Robert More; John Plumptre	Member of Parliament for Bishops Castle; 1734–1741; With: Robert More	Succeeded by Henry Brydges; Andrew Hill
Preceded by Robert Williams	Member of Parliament for Montgomeryshire; 1747–1772	Succeeded by Watkin Williams
