= Charles Stanhope (1708–1736) =

Charles Stanhope (6 September 1708 – 20 February 1736) was a Member of Parliament (MP) for Derby.

Charles Stanhope was born on 6 September 1708 to the 3rd Earl of Chesterfield and Elizabeth Stanhope. He was a grandson of the 2nd Lord Chesterfield, in whom the estate was named after. For six years, (1730 - 1736) he sat in the House of Commons of Great Britain as MP for Derby under an influence from his brother, Philip, Lord Chesterfield, whom he later followed into opposition in 1733. He voted against the Excise Bill in 1734, which became known as Septennial Act. After he won the opposition he was re-elected, 2 years later he died on 20 February 1736.

Parliament of Great Britain
Preceded by Charles Stanhope; Lord James Cavendish	Member of Parliament for Derby; 1730–1736; With: Lord James Cavendish	Succeeded by John Stanhope; Lord James Cavendish
