= John Stanhope (MP) =

British politician

John Stanhope (5 January 1705 – 4 December 1748), of Blackheath, Kent was a British politician who sat in the House of Commons between 1727 and 1748.

Stanhope was the third son of Philip Stanhope, 3rd Earl of Chesterfield and Lady Elizabeth Savile, daughter of the Marquess of Halifax.

Stanhope was brought in by the Duke of Newcastle as Member of Parliament (MP) for Nottingham on a compromise at the 1727 British general election. From 1728 to 1732, he was secretary to his brother, Philip Dormer, Lord Chesterfield, when he was ambassador at The Hague. In 1733 he followed Chesterfield into opposition and voted against the Excise Bill. He was not put up for Nottingham at the 1734 British general election but was returned on his family's interest at Derby at a by-election on 13 March 1736, in succession to his younger brother, Charles Stanhope. He also inherited his brother's fortune. He continued following Chesterfield politically, and voting against the Government. He was returned unopposed for Derby at the 1741 British general election. He became a government supporter in 1744, When Chesterfield joined the Administration. At the 1747 British general election, he was returned for Derby in a contest. He was made Lord of the Admiralty in February 1748, when Chesterfield resigned.

Stanhope died unmarried on 4 December 1748 of a fit of gout, that had affected his hands and feet for about a month, and which finally affected his stomach and head.

Parliament of Great Britain
Preceded by George Gregory; John Plumptre	Member of Parliament for Nottingham; 1727–1734; With: Borlase Warren	Succeeded by Borlase Warren; John Plumptre
Preceded by Lord James Cavendish; Charles Stanhope	Member of Parliament for Derby; 1736–1748; With: Lord James Cavendish 1736–1742; Viscount Duncannon 1742–48	Succeeded by Viscount Duncannon; Thomas Rivett
