= Alexander King (MP) =

Alexander King (died 1618) was an English politician who was elected a member for the Parliament of England for Bishop's Castle in 1589, 1593 and 1601.

== See also ==
- List of MPs elected to the English parliament in 1601
- List of MPs elected to the English parliament in 1593
