= Robert Bristow (1712–1776) =

English politician

Robert Bristow (1712 – 9 December 1776) of Micheldever in Hampshire was an English politician.

His father Robert (1687–1737) and his grandfather Robert (1662–1706), as well as his uncle John had all been Members of Parliament.

Bristow was a Member of Parliament (MP) for Winchelsea from 1738 to 1741, and for New Shoreham from 1747 to 1761. He was appointed a Clerk of the Green Cloth from 1738 to 1740.

He married twice and had a son and 4 daughters.

Parliament of Great Britain
Preceded by Robert Bristow (father); Edmund Hungate Beaghan	Member of Parliament for Winchelsea; 1738 – 1741; With: Edmund Hungate Beaghan	Succeeded by Thomas Orby Hunter; The Viscount Doneraile
Preceded by Thomas Brand; Charles Frederick	Member of Parliament for New Shoreham; 1741 – 1768; With: Charles Frederick to 1747; Richard Stratton 1747–58; Sir William Williams, Bt from 1758	Succeeded by Sir William Williams, Bt; The Viscount Midleton
