= Sir William Williams, 2nd Baronet, of Clapton =

English politician

Sir William Williams Bt
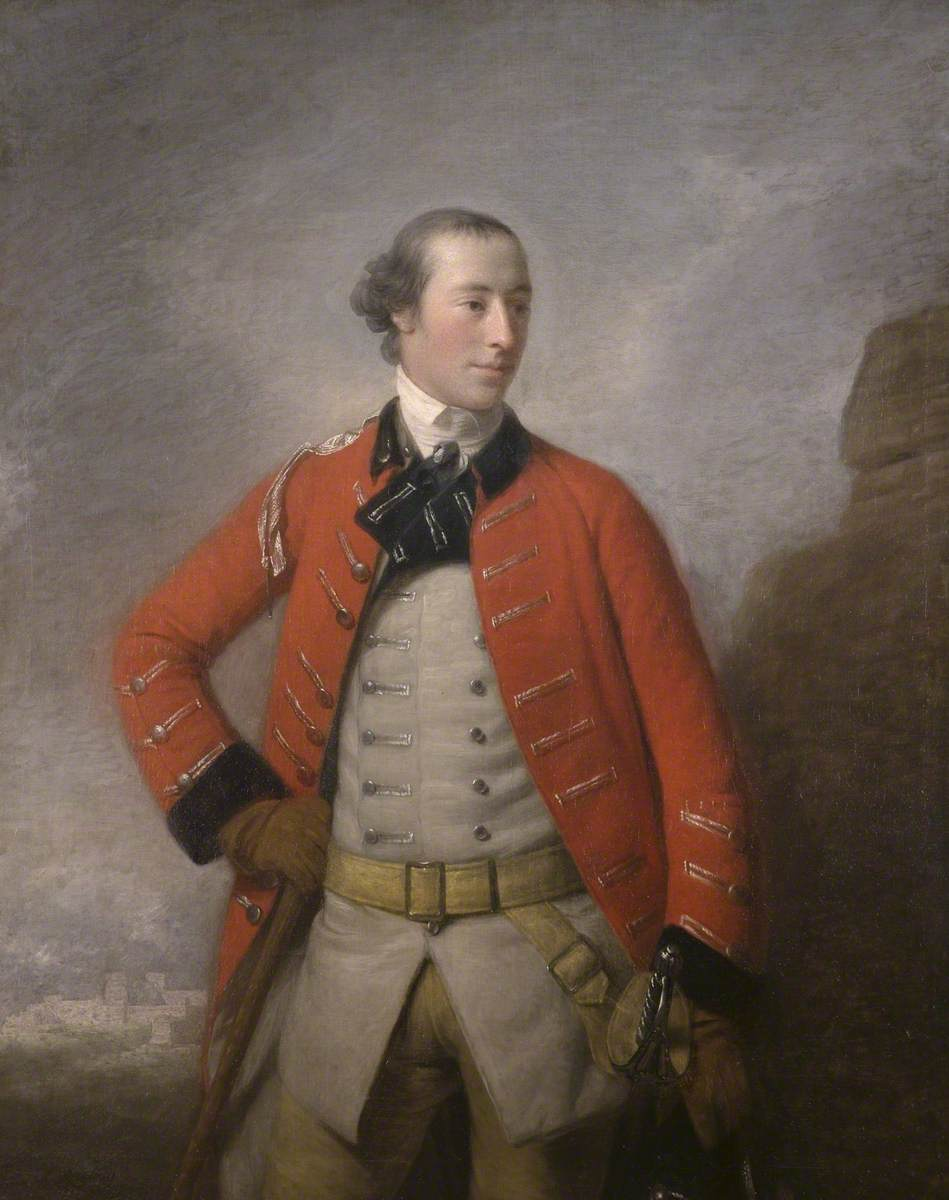
- Williams in 1759, by Allan Ramsay

Member of Parliament for New Shoreham
- In office 1758–1761

Personal details
- Born: c.1730 Northamptonshire, England
- Died: 27 April 1761 Belle Île, France
- Education: Clare College

Military service
- Allegiance: Great Britain
- Branch/service: British Army
- Years of service: 1759–1761
- Rank: Captain
- Unit: 16th Light Dragoons
- Battles/wars: Seven Years' War; Capture of Belle Île †

Sir William Peere Williams, 2nd Baronet (c.1730 – 27 April 1761) was an English politician in Great Britain.

He was born in Clapton, Northamptonshire, England, to Sir Hutchins Williams, 1st Baronet of Clapton, and Anne Hutchins.

He was Member of Parliament for New Shoreham from 1758 until his death in 1761.

An officer in the British Army who served in the Seven Years' War, Williams was killed at Butalot in the Capture of Belle Île in France.

== Notes ==
Parliament of Great Britain
Preceded by Robert Bristow; Richard Stratton	Member of Parliament for New Shoreham; 1758–1761; With: Robert Bristow to 1761; The Viscount Midleton from 1761	Succeeded by Lord Pollington; The Viscount Midleton
Baronetage of Great Britain
Preceded by Hutchins Williams	Baronet (of Clapton); 1758–1761	Succeeded by Booth Williams
