= Hutchins Williams =

English gentleman

Sir Hutchins Williams, 1st Baronet (c. 1700 – 4 November 1758) was an English gentleman. He was born in London, England, to William Peere Williams and Anne Hutchins. He was admitted to Gray's Inn in 1718, and matriculated at The Queen's College, Oxford in 1725. He was created a Baronet of Clapton, Northampton, on 4 April 1747.

== Family ==
On 18 March 1726 Hutchins married Judith Booth, daughter of James Booth. They had issue:

- William Peere-Williams (c. 1730–1761)
- Sir Booth Williams, 3rd Baronet (c. 1735–1784)
- Ann Williams

== Notes ==
Baronetage of Great Britain
New creation	Baronet (of Clapton); 1747–1758	Succeeded by William Williams
