= Bishop's Castle (constituency) =

Parliamentary constituency in the United Kingdom, 1584 to 1832

- Former borough constituency for the House of Commons
- Borough: Bishop's Castle

1584–1832
- Seats: 2
- Replaced by: South Shropshire

Bishop's Castle was a borough constituency in Shropshire represented in the House of Commons of the Parliament of the United Kingdom.

The market town of Bishop's Castle became a parliamentary borough in 1584 and was a constituency of the House of Commons of England until 1707, of the House of Commons of Great Britain from 1707 to 1800, and of the House of Commons of the United Kingdom from 1801 to 1832. It was represented by two burgesses.

The historian Lewis Namier claimed that in the middle of the eighteenth century it was the one notoriously corrupt parliamentary borough in Shropshire. It was abolished under the Reform Act 1832.

== Members of Parliament ==
=== MPs 1584–1660 ===
| Parliament | First member | Second member |
|---|---|---|
| 1584 | Thomas Jukes | John Cole |
| 1586 | Charles Walcot | Thomas Darrell |
| 1588 | Charles Walcot | Alexander King |
| 1593 | Francis Beavans | Alexander King |
| 1597 | Hayward Townsend | Edmund Baynham |
| 1601 | Hayward Townsend | Alexander King |
| 1604 | William Twyneho | Samuel Lewknor |
| 1614 | Edward Littleton | Thomas Hitchcock |
| 1621 | Francis Roberts | Gilbert Cornwall |
| 1624 | Sir Robert Howard | Richard Oakeley |
| 1625 | William Oakeley | Edward Waring |
| 1626 | William Oakeley | Edward Waring |
| 1628 | Sir Robert Howard | Sir Edward Fox |
| 1629–1640 | No Parliaments summoned | |
| 1640 (Apr) | Sir Robert Howard | Richard Moor |
| 1640 (Nov) | Sir Robert Howard | Richard Moor |
| 1645 | Isaiah Thomas | John Corbet |
| 1648 | Isaiah Thomas | John Corbet |
| 1653 | Bishop's Castle not represented in Barebones Parliament | |
| 1654 | Bishop's Castle not represented in 1st Protectorate Parliament | |
| 1656 | Bishop's Castle not represented in 2nd Protectorate Parliament | |
| 1659 | Samuel More | William Oakeley |

=== MPs 1660–1832 ===
| Year | First member | First party | Second member | Second party |
|---|---|---|---|---|
| 1660 | William Oakeley | | Edmund Waring | |
| 1679 | Richard Scriven | | Edmund Waring | |
| 1681 | Sir Richard Mason | | Richard More | |
| 1685 | Edmund Waring | | Francis Charlton | |
| 1689 | Richard More | | Walter Waring | |
| Mr. 1690 | William Oakeley | | Richard Mason | |
| May 1690 | William Oakeley | | Walter Waring | |
| Mr. 1695 | Richard More | | Walter Waring | |
| Oct. 1695 | Richard More | | Charles Mason | |
| 1698 | Sir William Brownlow | | Charles Mason | |
| Jan. 1701 | George Walcot | | Charles Mason | |
| Nov. 1701 | Henry Brett | | Charles Mason | |
| 1706 | Henry Brett | | Henry Newport | Whig |
| 1708 | Richard Harnage | | Charles Mason | |
| 1710 | Richard Harnage | | Sir Robert Raymond | |
| 1715 | Richard Harnage | | Charles Mason | |
| 1719 | Sir Matthew Decker | | Charles Mason | |
| 1722 | William Peere Williams | | Bowater Vernon | |
| 1726 | William Peere Williams | | Charles Mason | |
| 1727 | Robert More | | John Plumptre | |
| 1734 | Robert More | | Edward Kynaston | |
| 1741 | Henry Brydges | | Andrew Hill | |
| 1744 | Granville Leveson-Gower | | Andrew Hill | |
| 1747 | Samuel Child | | John Robinson Lytton | |
| 1753 | John Dashwood-King | | John Robinson Lytton | |
| 1754 | John Dashwood-King | | Barnaby Backwell | |
| 1755 | John Dashwood-King | | Walter Waring | |
| 1759 | John Dashwood-King | | Henry Grenville | |
| 1761 | Francis Child | | Peregrine Cust | |
| 1763 | George Clive | | Peregrine Cust | |
| 1768 | George Clive | | William Clive | |
| 1770 | George Clive | | Alexander Wedderburn | |
| 1774 | George Clive | | Henry Strachey | |
| 1778 | George Clive | | Alexander Wedderburn | |
| 1779 | William Clive | | Alexander Wedderburn | |
| 1780 | William Clive | | Henry Strachey | |
| 1802 | William Clive | | John Robinson | |
| 1819 | William Clive | | Douglas Kinnaird | |
| 1820 | William Holmes | Tory | Edward Rogers | Tory |
| 1830 | Frederick Hamilton Cornewall | Tory | Edward Rogers | Tory |
| 1831 | James Knight-Bruce | Tory | Edward Rogers | Tory |

- Constituency abolished / disenfranchised (1832)

== Election results ==
=== Elections in the 1830s ===
General election, 30 April 1831: Bishop's Castle
| Party | Candidate | Votes | % |
|---|---|---|---|
| Tory | Edward Rogers (MP) | Unopposed | |
| Tory | James Knight | Unopposed | |
| Registered electors | | c. 200 | |
| Tory hold | | | |
| Tory hold | | | |

General election, 31 July 1830: Bishop's Castle
| Party | Candidate | Votes | % |
|---|---|---|---|
| Tory | Edward Rogers (MP) | Unopposed | |
| Tory | Frederick Cornewall (Bishop's Castle MP) | Unopposed | |
| Registered electors | | c. 200 | |
| Tory hold | | | |
| Tory hold | | | |

== See also ==
- Parliamentary constituencies in Shropshire#Historical constituencies
- List of former United Kingdom Parliament constituencies
- Unreformed House of Commons
