= George Clark Williams =

Welsh lawyer (1878–1958)

His Honour Sir George Clark Williams, 1st Baronet, QC (2 November 1878 – 15 October 1958), was a Welsh lawyer and County Court judge.

Born in Llanelli, Carmarthenshire, Williams practiced as a solicitor, then as a barrister in Wales. He served in the British Army during the First World War. He unsuccessfully contested Llanelli as a National Liberal in the 1922 general election. Made a King's Counsel in 1934, he was appointed a County Court judge in 1935 on Circuit No. 30 (Glamorganshire), serving until 1948 when he was appointed Deputy National Insurance Commissioner for Wales, serving until 1950.

He was Lord Lieutenant of Carmarthenshire from 1949 until 1953.

The Williams Baronetcy, of Llanelly in the County of Carmarthen, was created in the Baronetage of the United Kingdom for him in 1955. The baronetcy became extinct on his death in 1958.

Baronetage of the United Kingdom
New creation	Baronet (of Llanelly); 1955–1958	Extinct
