= Robert Danvers =

English politician (1624 – 1674)

Robert Danvers also Wright, Howard and Villiers (19 October 1624 – 1674) was an English soldier and landowner who briefly sat in the House of Commons in 1659 and 1660. The illegitimate child of a notorious liaison, Danvers had at least four different names, changed his religion four times, and sided according to circumstances with Royalists, Parliamentarians, the restored monarchy, and its opponents.

Danvers was the illegitimate son of Frances Coke, Viscountess Purbeck, the estranged wife of John Villiers, 1st Viscount Purbeck, probably by Sir Robert Howard of Clun Castle, Shropshire and was baptised as Robert Wright. His mother was the daughter of Sir Edward Coke of Stoke Poges, Buckinghamshire. After they were convicted of adultery, his parents went to France where he was educated between 1633 and 1641 under the name of Robert Howard and brought up as a Roman Catholic. His mother brought him back to England at the start of the English Civil War and Lord Purbeck was persuaded to recognise him as his son and let him assume the name Villiers. As Robert Villiers, he fought for the king at the Battle of Edgehill and in 1643 became a colonel of foot in the Royalist army and governor of Oswestry. In 1644 he was dismissed by Prince Rupert, became a Presbyterian, and submitted to Parliament. He inherited the estates of his mother on her death in 1645. He paid fines of £2,650 for his delinquency with borrowed money, but the estates were not freed of sequestration until 1653. As Robert Villiers, on 23 November 1648, he married Elizabeth Danvers, daughter and heiress of the regicide Sir John Danvers of Dauntsey, Wiltshire, and they had two sons and three daughters. After he had married the daughter of Danvers, he stated that he would have been willing to act as the King’s executioner. When his father-in-law died in 1655, Oliver Cromwell allowed him to assume the name and arms of Danvers "because those of the name of Villiers had sided" with the King. On Lord Purbeck’s death in 1658, he did not seek to claim the peerage.

In 1659, Danvers was elected as one of the two Members of Parliament for Westbury, Wiltshire, in the Third Protectorate Parliament and sat until he was expelled as a Cavalier. In April 1660 he was elected as one of the members for Malmesbury to sit in the Convention Parliament, but after the Restoration of Charles II, he was challenged over the treasonable remarks he had made about the previous King's execution. There followed a dispute over parliamentary privilege, when on 15 June 1660 Danvers was summoned to the House of Lords as Viscount Purbeck to answer charges. He argued that he was not a peer, and on 27 July was discharged on bail for £10,000. On 27 December 1660, he swore allegiance to the restored monarchy and entered into a bond of £5,000 to do nothing to oppose it.

Before Venner's rising in January 1661, Danvers spoke for the Anabaptists and against the monarchy. He was imprisoned in the Tower of London, where he was still incarcerated on 2 July 1662 when his wife visited him there, and they were given licence to take the name and arms of Danvers. He was transferred to York gaol, from which he escaped in 1664. In the course of the Second Anglo-Dutch War, he was imprisoned on the Isle of Wight. In 1668, he was given the freedom of Wycombe. He was forced to leave England to escape his creditors and died at Calais in 1674, where he was buried a Roman Catholic in the church of Nôtre Dame.

Parliament of England
Preceded by Not represented in Second Protectorate Parliament	Member of Parliament for Westbury; 1659; With: William Eyre	Succeeded by Not represented in Restored Rump
