= Henry Watkins (diplomat) =

English diplomat and army administrator (1666–1727)

Arms of Watkins: Azure, a fess vair between three leopard's faces jessant-de-lys or

Henry Watkins (1666–1727) of Christ Church, Oxford, and Duke Street, Westminster, was an army administrator and diplomat who served briefly as a Member of Parliament for Brackley in Northamptonshire (20 April 1714 – 1715).

== Origins ==
He was the second son of Rev. Richard Watkins, Rector of Whichford in Warwickshire, by his wife Elizabeth Hyckes. His elder brother was Fleetwood Watkins, an army officer, and another brother was Dr Richard Watkins, a senior don at Magdalen College, Oxford until 1709. His sister was Henrietta Watkins, wife of Sir Matthew Decker, 1st Baronet (1679–1749) of Richmond Green in Surrey, of Dutch origin, MP, Governor of the South Sea Company from 1711 to 1712, and a Director of the East India Company in 1713. Henrietta's grandson, and the eventual heir of Sir Matthew Decker, was Richard FitzWilliam, 7th Viscount FitzWilliam (1745-1816) of Mount Merrion, Dublin, Ireland, who by his will founded the Fitzwilliam Museum in Cambridge.

== Career ==
He spent much time on diplomatic missions to the Low Countries (Holland) and The Hague, and worked closely with Adam de Cardonnel, secretary to the Duke of Marlborough, of whom he was a "dedicated servant and admirer". He purchased an estate at Chetwode in Buckinghamshire.

== Death ==
He died unmarried on 25 March 1727 at his house in Duke Street and bequeathed most of his estate, valued at about £10,000, to his elder brother Fleetwood.
