= Fetherstonhaugh baronets =

English Nobility

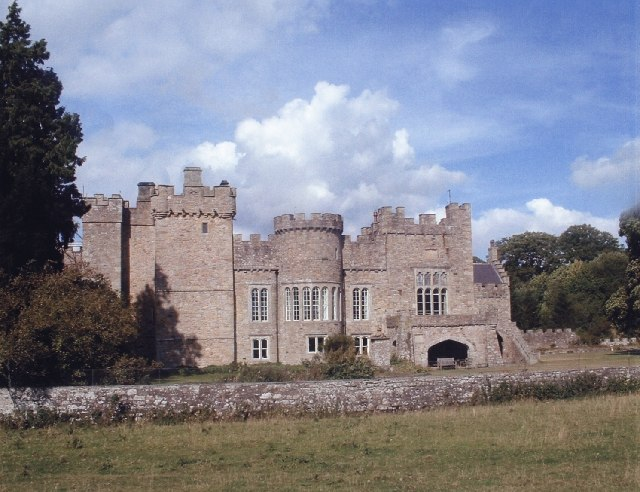
Featherstone Castle, the seat of the Fetherstonhaugh baronets

The Fetherstonhaugh baronetcy, of Fetherstonhaugh in the County of Northumberland, was a title in the Baronetage of Great Britain. It was created on 3 January 1747 for Matthew Fetherstonhaugh, of Featherstone Castle, Northumberland, and of Uppark, Sussex, later Member of Parliament for Morpeth and Portsmouth. He had previously succeeded to the estates of his kinsman, Sir Henry Fetherston, 2nd Baronet (see Fetherston baronets).

He was succeeded by his minor son, Henry Fetherstonhaugh (known as Harry). The second Baronet also became Member of Parliament for Portsmouth—from 1782 to 1796, although never once speaking in the House of Commons. Indeed, he has been described as a "witless playboy". The title became extinct on his death in 1846.

== Fetherstonhaugh baronets, of Fetherstonhaugh (1747) ==
- Sir Matthew Fetherstonhaugh, 1st Baronet (1715–1774)
- Sir Henry Fetherstonhaugh, 2nd Baronet (1754–1846)

Coat of arms of Fetherstonhaugh of Fetherstonhaugh
Crest An antelope's head erased Argent, armed Or Escutcheon Gules, on a chevron, between three ostrich feathers Argent, a pellet. Supporters Supporters

== See also ==
- Fetherston baronets

Baronetage of Great Britain
Preceded by Pepperell baronets	Fetherstonhaugh baronets of Fetherstonhaugh; 3 January 1747	Succeeded by Williams baronets
