= Fetherston baronets =

Extinct baronetcy in the Baronetage of England

There have been two baronetcies created for persons with the surname Fetherston, one in the Baronetage of England and one in the Baronetage of Ireland. Both are extinct.

The Fetherston Baronetcy of Blakesware, Hertfordshire was created in the Baronetage of England for Heneage Fetherston on 4 Dec 1660.

The Fetherston Baronetcy of Ardagh, County Longford was created in the Baronetage of Ireland for Ralph Fetherston on 4 August 1776.

== Fetherston baronets, of Blakesware, Hertfordshire (1660) ==
- Sir Heneage Fetherston, 1st Baronet (c. 1628 – 23 October 1711)
- Sir Henry Fetherston, 2nd Baronet (c. 1654 – 17 October 1746) Baronetcy extinct on his death

Coat of arms of Fetherston of Blakesware
Escutcheon Gules, on a cheveron, between three ostrich feathers Argent, a pellet.

== Fetherston baronets, of Ardagh, County Longford (1776) ==
- Sir Ralph Fetherston, 1st Baronet (born by 1731 – 3 June 1780)
- Sir Thomas Fetherston, 2nd Baronet (1759 – 19 July 1819) MP for Longford 1801–1819
- Sir George Fetherston, 3rd Baronet (4 June 1784 – 12 July 1853) MP for Longford 1819–1830
- Sir Thomas Francis Fetherston, 4th Baronet (1800 – 28 August 1853)
- Sir Thomas John Fetherston, 5th Baronet (22 July 1824 – 21 September 1869)
- Sir George Ralph Fetherston, 6th Baronet (8 April 1852 – 11 February 1923) Baronetcy extinct on his death. He was survived by his sister Adeline Margaret.

Coat of arms of Fetherston of Ardagh
Crest An antelope statant Argent, armed Or. Escutcheon Gules, on a cheveron, between three ostrich feathers Argent, a martlet of the field. Motto Volens et valens

== See also ==
- Fetherstonhaugh baronets
