= John Brodrick =

British Army general (1765–1842)

General The Honourable John Brodrick
- Born: 3 November 1765; Reading
- Died: 9 October 1842 (aged 76)
- Spouse: Ann Graham
- Relatives: George Brodrick, 3rd Viscount Midleton (father)
- Military career
- Allegiance: Kingdom of Great Britain
- Branch: British Army
- Service years: 1782–before 1842
- Rank: General
- Commands: Governor of Martinique
- Conflicts: Siege of Dunkirk (1793); Peninsular War

General John Brodrick (3 November 1765 – 9 October 1842) was a British Army general and Governor of Martinique.

He was born in Reading, the youngest son of George Brodrick, 3rd Viscount Midleton and his wife Albinia Townshend. His elder brothers included George Brodrick, 4th Viscount Midleton and Charles Brodrick, Archbishop of Cashel.

He joined the army as an ensign in the 1st Regiment of Foot Guards in 1782. He fought at the Siege of Dunkirk in 1793 and at the capture of Fort St Andre the following year. He was promoted captain and lieutenant-colonel in 1794 and colonel in 1801. In 1808 and 1809 he served in the Peninsular War and from June 1809 to 1812, promoted to major-general, he was Governor of Martinique during a period of British occupation. He was promoted full general on 22 July 1830.

He died in 1842 and was buried at Reading. He had married Anne Graham, the daughter of Robert Graham of Fintry, Kent. They had one son, John Robert, and three daughters.
