= George Hutchins (lawyer) =

English lawyer and politician

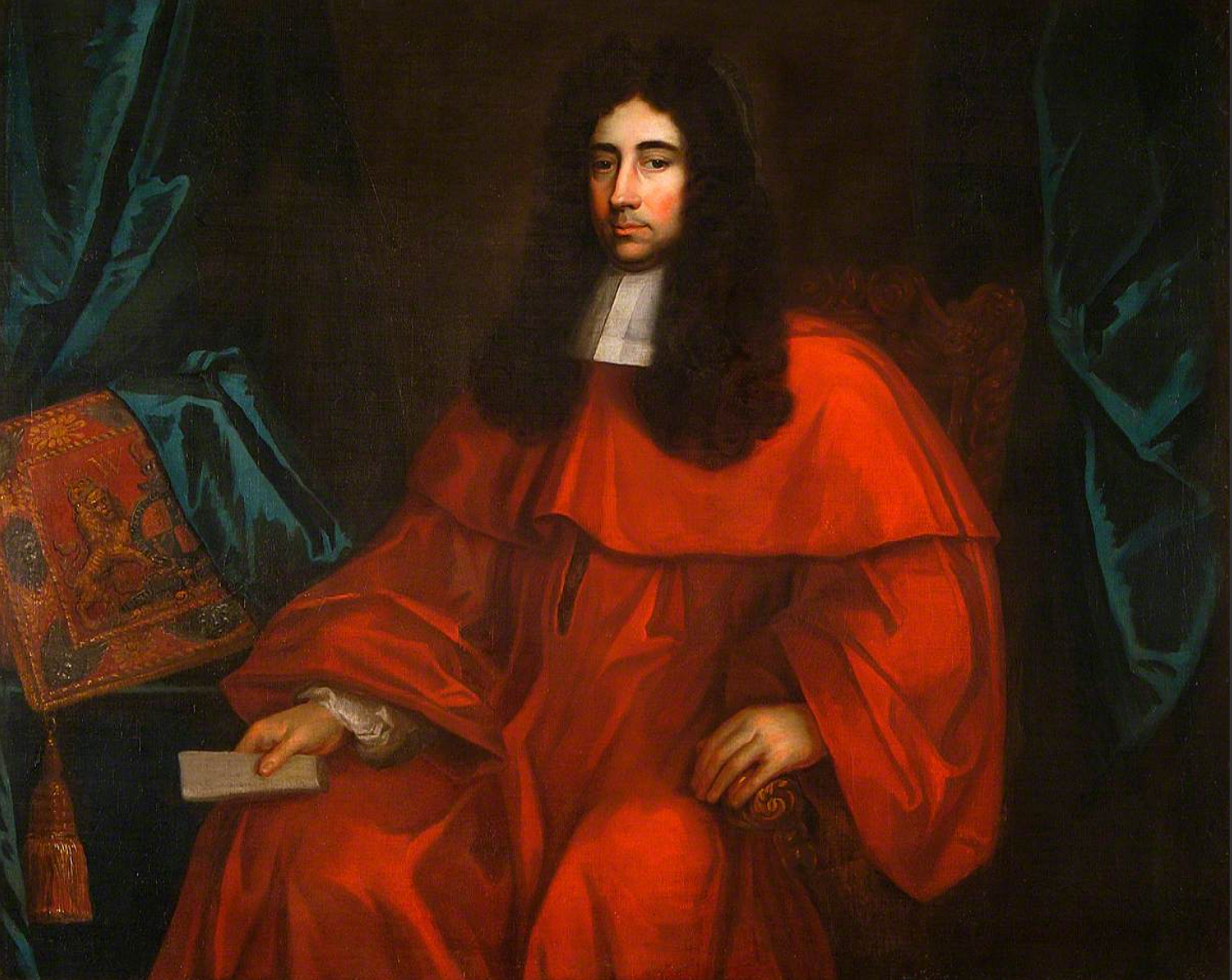
Sir George Hutchins of Northaw Place

Sir George Hutchins (died 1705) was an English lawyer and politician, a Member of Parliament and king's serjeant.

== Life ==
He was the son and heir of Edmund Hutchins of Georgeham in Devon. On 19 May 1666 he entered Gray's Inn, and was called to the bar there in August of the following year.

At Easter 1686 Hutchins was made serjeant-at-law by James II, and in May 1689 was chosen king's serjeant to William III, who knighted him the following October. He became Member of Parliament for Barnstaple in the 1690 English general election. In May 1690 he succeeded Sir Anthony Keck as third commissioner of the Great Seal, and acted until the elevation of Sir John Somers as Lord Keeper on 22 March 1693.

Hutchins then resumed practice at the bar, and claimed his right to retain his former position of king's serjeant. The judges decided against him, on the ground that the post was merely an office conferred by the crown; but the king settled the question by reappointing him his serjeant on 6 May. He died at his house in Greville Street, Holborn, on 6 July 1705.

== Family ==
Hutchins married, first, Mary, daughter of Sir William Leman, 1st Baronet, who died in 1695; they had at least three children. His second wife was Sarah, daughter of Sir William Leman, 2nd Baronet, and so niece to his first wife, whom he married in 1697.

On the marriage in 1697 of his two daughters, Hutchins gave each of them a portion of £20,000. The husband of Anne, the second daughter, was William Peere Williams. The younger daughter, Mary, married Richard Minshall.

== Notes ==
Attribution

This article incorporates text from a publication now in the public domain: Lee, Sidney, ed. (1891). "Hutchins, George". Dictionary of National Biography. Vol. 28. London: Smith, Elder & Co.
