= Williams baronets of Llangibby (1642) =

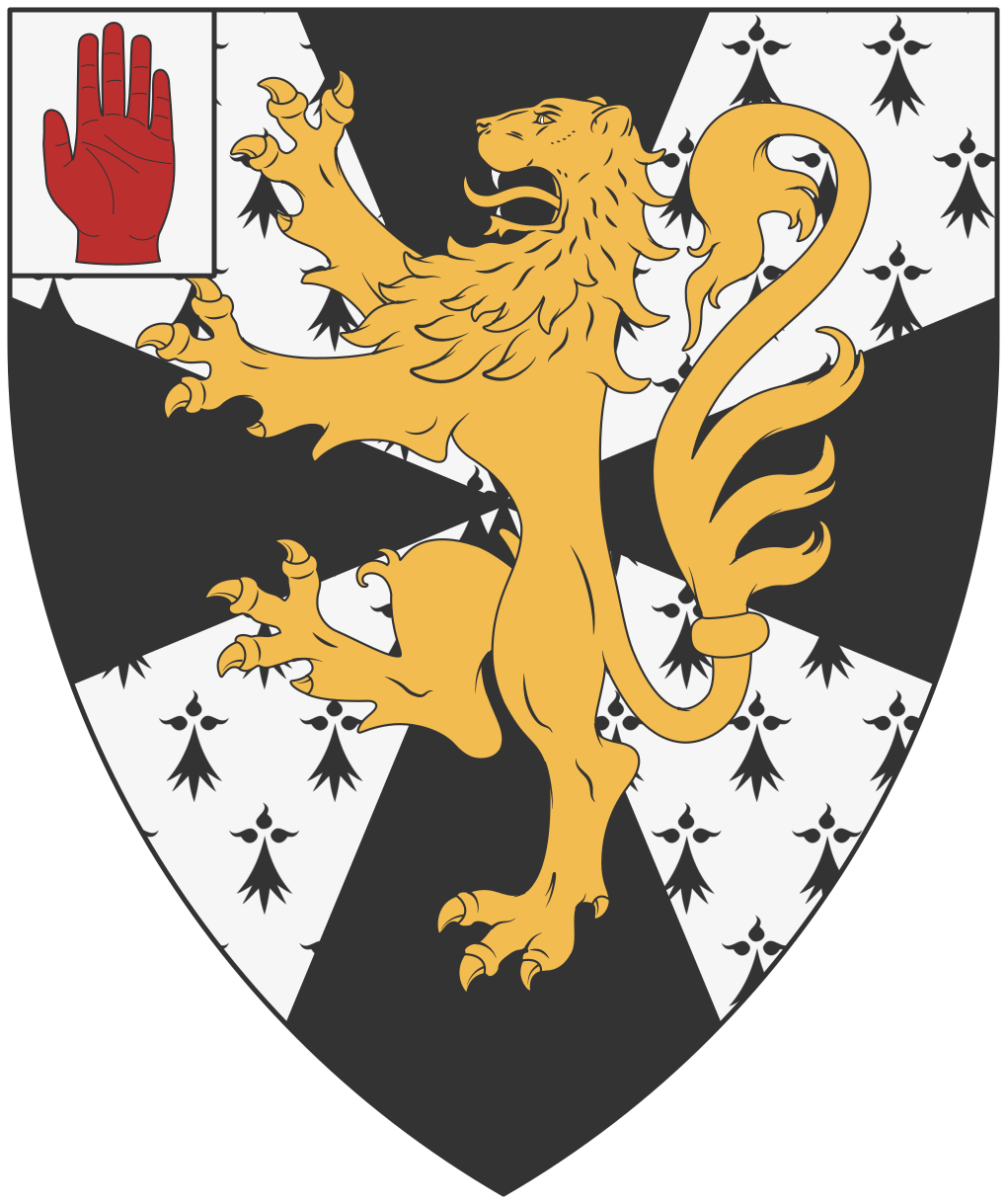
Escutcheon of the Williams baronets of Llangibby

The Williams baronetcy, of Llangibby in the County of Monmouth, was created in the Baronetage of England on 14 May 1642 for Trevor Williams, son of Charles Williams. He was the Royalist Governor of Monmouth Castle on its capture in 1645. He later sat as Member of Parliament for Monmouthshire and Monmouth.

The 2nd Baronet also represented those constituencies in the House of Commons, while 3rd Baronet sat for the former. On the death of 5th Baronet in 1753 the title became extinct.

== Williams baronets, of Llangibby (1642) ==
- Sir Trevor Williams, 1st Baronet (c. 1622–1692)
- Sir John Williams, 2nd Baronet (c. 1651–1704)
- Sir Hopton Williams, 3rd Baronet (c. 1663–1723)
- Sir John Williams, 4th Baronet (died 1739)
- Sir Leonard Williams, 5th Baronet (died 1753)
