= Williams baronets of Vaynol (1622) =

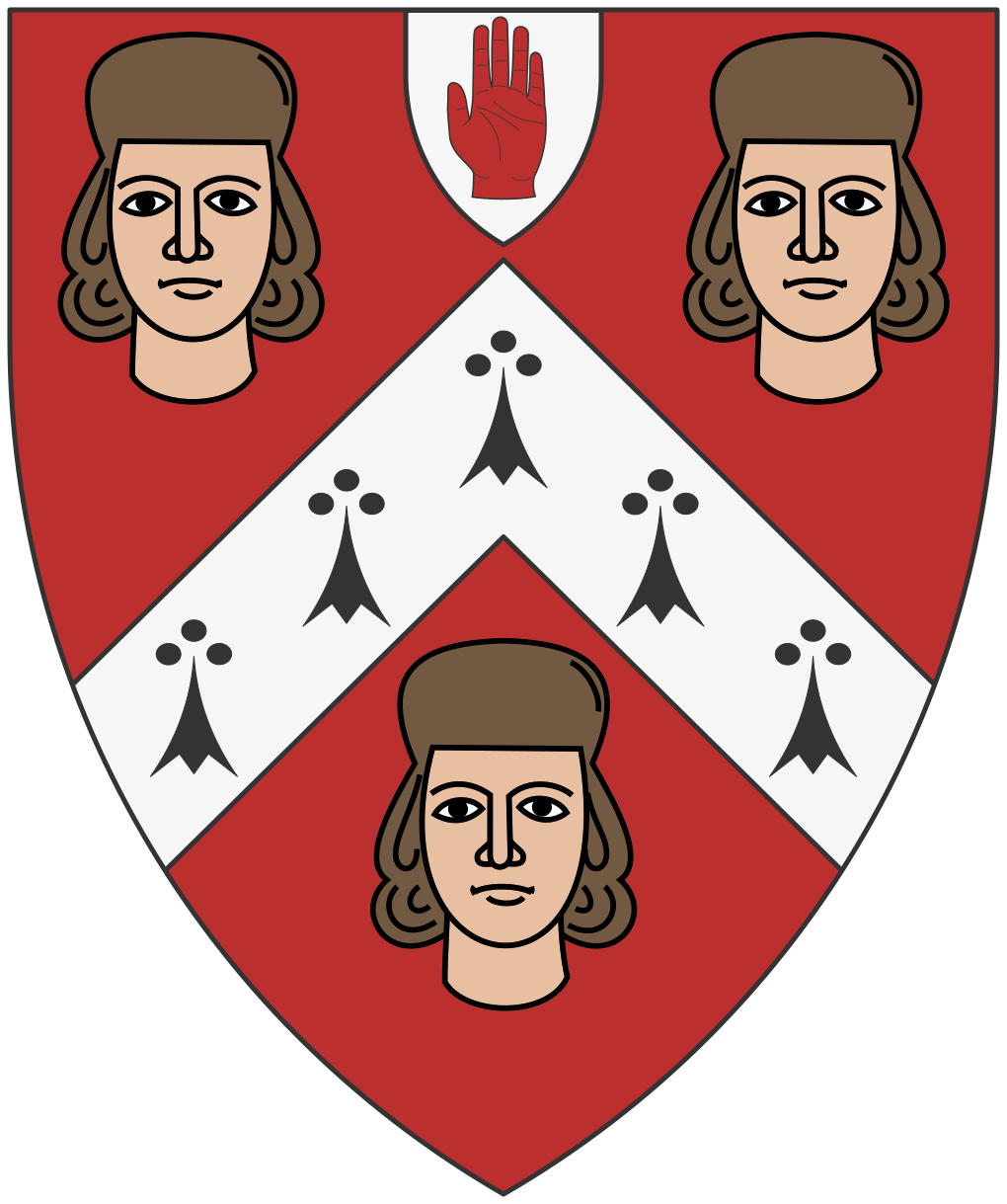
Escutcheon of the Williams baronets of Vaynol

The Williams baronetcy, of Vaynol in the County of Carnarvon, was created in the Baronetage of England on 15 June 1622 for William Williams, a relation of John Williams, from 1621 Bishop of Lincoln and Lord Keeper of the Great Seal.

The 6th Baronet represented Caernarvonshire in the House of Commons. On his death in 1696 the title became extinct.

== Williams baronets, of Vaynol (1622) ==
- Sir William Williams, 1st Baronet (died c. 1630)
- Sir Thomas Williams, 2nd Baronet (died c. 1650)
- Sir William Williams, 3rd Baronet (died c. 1659)
- Sir Griffith Williams, 4th Baronet (died c. 1663)
- Sir Thomas Williams, 5th Baronet (died c. 1673)
- Sir William Williams, 6th Baronet (c. 1668–1696)
