= Williams baronets of Guernevet (1644) =

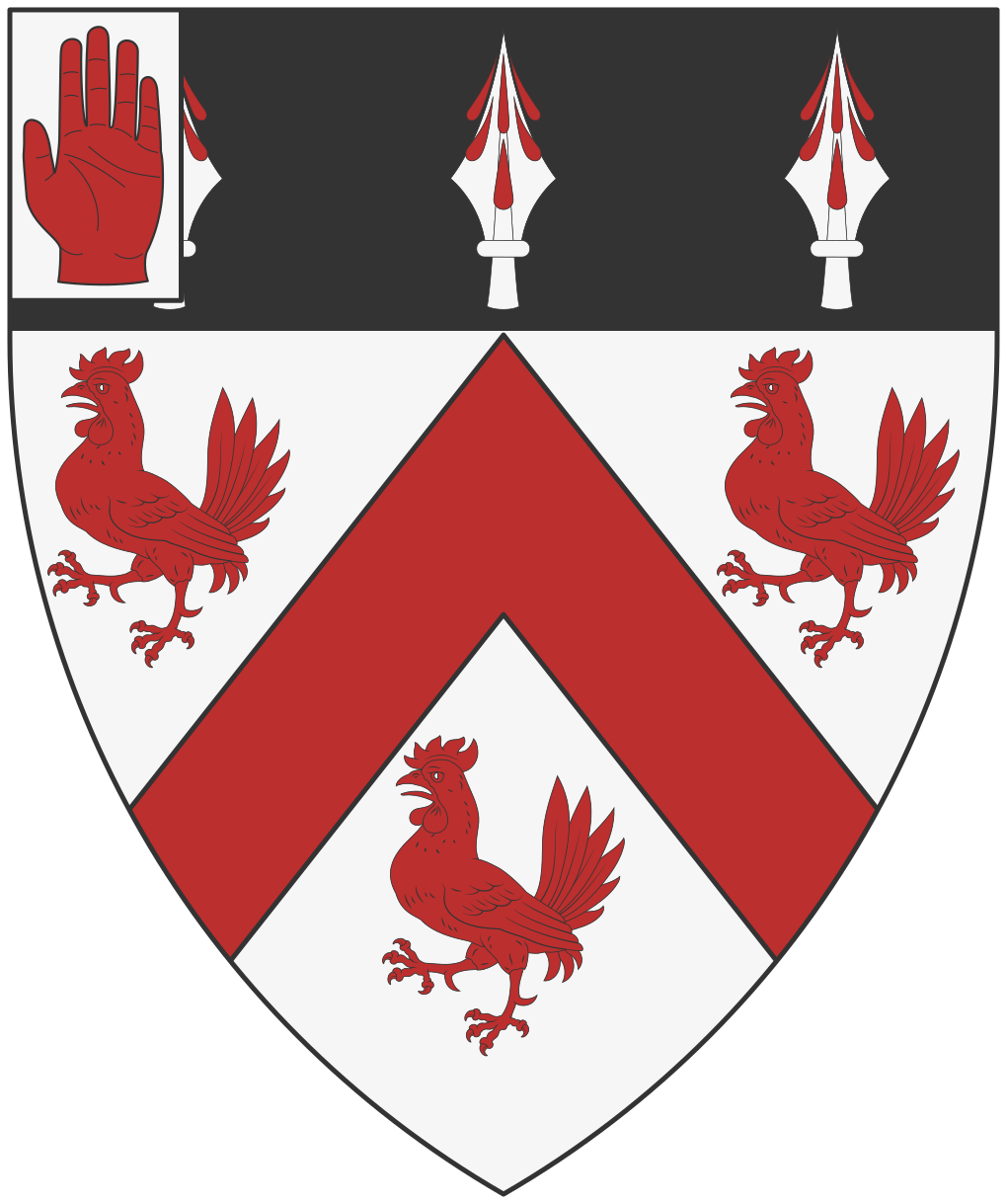
Escutcheon of the Williams baronets of Guernevet

The Williams baronetcy, of Guernevet or Gwernevet (Gwernyfed) in the County of Brecon, was created in the Baronetage of England on 4 May 1644 for Henry Williams, son of Sir Henry Williams. He had represented Breconshire in Parliament, in 1628.

The 2nd Baronet sat as Member of Parliament for Brecon. The title became extinct on the death of the 3rd Baronet in c. 1695.

== Williams baronets, of Guernevet (1644) ==
- Sir Henry Williams, 1st Baronet (c.1607–c.1652)
- Sir Henry Williams, 2nd Baronet (c.1635–1666)
- Sir Walter Williams, 3rd Baronet (c.1636–c.1695)
