= Theodorus Netscher =

Dutch painter

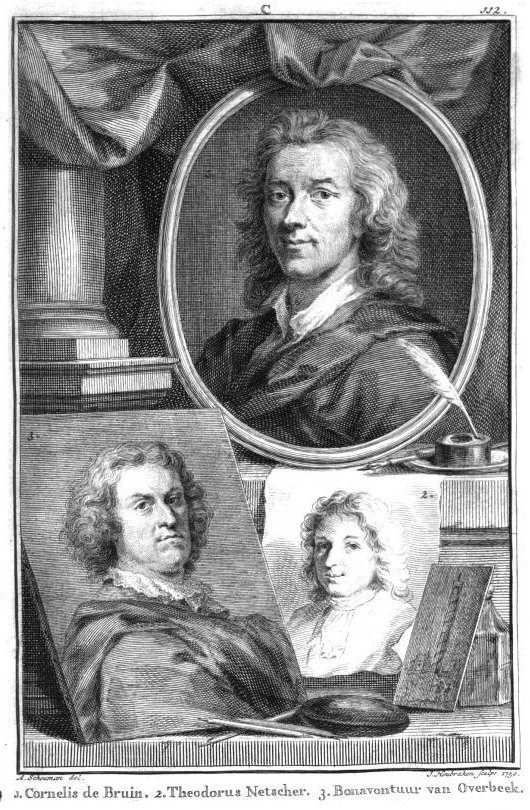
Portrait of Theodorus Netscher below right in Johan van Gool's Nieuwe Schouburg

Theodorus Netscher (1661–1728; also called Theodor/Theodoor/de Fransche Netscher) was an 18th-century painter from the Dutch Republic.

== Biography ==
According to Johan van Gool he was taught to paint from his father, and though he was born in Bordeaux, he was trained mostly in the Hague and came to be known as the "French Netscher" not because of his place of birth, but because of his later work in Paris, where he lived from 1680 until 1699.

According to the RKD he was the son and pupil of Caspar Netscher, and the older brother of the painters Constantijn and Anthonie Netscher. He worked in The Hague and made trips to Paris and England, before moving to Hulst where he later died. He consorted with Roger de Piles, either in the Hague or Paris. He is known for portraits and interior wall decorations.
