= Williams baronets of Bridehead (1915) =

Escutcheon of the Williams baronets of Bridehead

The Williams baronetcy, of Bridehead in the County of Dorset, was created in the Baronetage of the United Kingdom on 9 February 1915 for Robert Williams, who represented Dorset West in the House of Commons as a Conservative, from 1895 to 1922.

== Williams baronets, of Bridehead (1915) ==
- Sir Robert Williams, 1st Baronet (1848–1943)
- Sir Philip Francis Cunningham Williams, 2nd Baronet (1884–1958)
- Sir David Philip Williams, 3rd Baronet (1909–1970)
- Sir (Robert) Philip Nathaniel Williams, 4th Baronet (born 1950)

The heir apparent is the present holder's only son David Robert Mark Williams (born 1980).
