= Williams baronets of Cilgeraint (1953) =

The Williams baronetcy, of Cilgeraint, parish of Llandygai, in the County of Carnarvon, was created in the Baronetage of the United Kingdom on 3 July 1953 for the politician Herbert Williams, Member of Parliament for Reading, Croydon South and Croydon East. As of 2026 the title is held by the 3rd Baronet, who succeeded in 2013.

== Williams baronets, of Cilgeraint (1953) ==
- Sir Herbert Geraint Williams, 1st Baronet (1884–1954)
- Sir Robin Philip Williams, 2nd Baronet (1928–2013)
- Sir Anthony Geraint Williams, 3rd Baronet (born 1958)

The heir apparent is the present holder's son Thomas Alexander Philip Williams (born 1992).
