= Robert Howard (Royalist) =

English landowner, member of parliament, and Royalist soldier

Sir Robert Howard
- Born: c January 1598
- Died: 22 April 1653
- Noble family: House of Howard
- Spouse: Catherine Neville
- Father: Thomas Howard, first earl of Suffolk
- Mother: Katherine Knyvett

Sir Robert Howard KB (cJanuary 1598 – 22 April 1653) was an English landowner, member of parliament, and Royalist soldier. He was involved in a scandal when his mistress Frances Coke, Viscountess Purbeck, was found guilty of adultery and was twice summoned to explain her pregnancy with his son to the Court of High Commission. During the English Civil War, Howard was in command of the defence of Bridgnorth Castle when it surrendered to the Parliamentarians in 1646.

== Biography ==
Robert Howard was the fifth son of Thomas Howard, first earl of Suffolk by his second wife, Catherine. He was uncle to the playwright Sir Robert Howard and brother of Theophilus, the second earl of Suffolk, Thomas, Earl of Berkshire and of Edward, Lord Howard of Escrick.

In 1626, on the death of Howard's elder brother, Sir Charles Howard of Clun, Howard inherited Clun Castle in Shropshire. He was the next heir under the Will of his great-uncle, the Earl of Nottingham.

== Frances Villiers ==
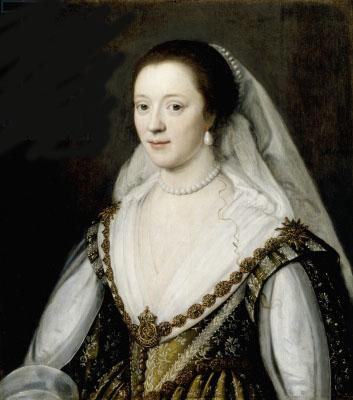
Frances Coke, Lady Purbeck, who lived with Howard for many years as his unofficial wife

Howard had a long affair with the estranged wife of John Villiers, 1st Viscount Purbeck. She was Frances Villiers, the daughter of Sir Edward Coke and his second wife Elizabeth Hatton (née Cecil), and it was said she had been forced into the marriage at the age of sixteen with John, who was the brother of the royal favourite George Villiers, the Duke of Buckingham. John was generally believed to be insane, and the marriage had taken place over vehement objections from her mother.

The result of the affair was a son born in October 1624 at Cripplegate who was initially called Robert Wright, but who would go on to take the name of Villiers and was finally known as Robert Danvers. Frances's brother-in-law the Duke of Buckingham had the pair brought before the Star Chamber on charges of adultery. Frances Villiers was found guilty. Howard was made a prisoner of the Fleet prison and excommunicated for refusing to answer questions at the trial. Frances, Lady Purbeck, was fined and sentenced to a term of imprisonment, and to do penance – but she fled abroad.

Eventually, she returned to England and reputedly set up house again with Howard, with the result that there were more children. In 1635, Howard was again summoned before the Star Chamber to answer for the resumed scandalous affair. He refused to answer as to the whereabouts of Frances and was kept for three months at the Fleet incommunicado, and he had to surrender bonds as surety that he would not again contact Frances and that he would appear again at the Star Chamber within 24 hours of being summoned.

== Parliamentarian ==
In 1623, Howard became a member of parliament for Bishops Castle in Shropshire and was chosen again at many subsequent elections, including the two during 1640 for the Short and Long parliaments. During the second, the Star Chamber made adverse findings with regard to Howard, but they were deemed unlawful and all of those involved were fined, with Howard receiving one thousand pounds in compensation.

== Royalist ==
Howard's credentials as a royalist had been laid in 1616. At the investiture of Prince Charles (afterwards Charles I) as Prince of Wales on 4 November, both Robert and his brother William (1600–1672) were made Knights of the Bath. Howard had to leave the House of Commons in 1642 after executing the king's Commission of Array, but he did attend the session of parliament held at Oxford in 1641. Howard is said to have led a regiment of dragoons and was in charge of Bridgnorth Castle when it was surrendered to the Parliamentarians in 1646. The three-week siege left the castle tower leaning more than the Tower of Pisa.

Howard was again fined. This time he had to pay 952 pounds to recover the lands that were sequestered in punishment.

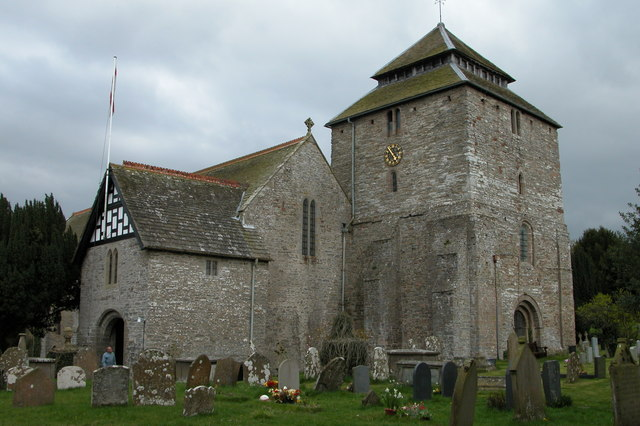
St. Georges Church, Clun

In 1648, Howard finally married (Frances Villiers had died in 1645). His wife was Catherine Nevill, a daughter of Henry Nevill, 9th Baron Bergavenny and his second wife Catherine Vaux, and they had three children. Howard died on 22 April 1653 at the Hall in the Forest and was buried at Clun, after which his wife remarried John Berry A brass plaque in St George's church in Clun, stating his age as 63, commemorated Robert Howard's life.

== Danvers ==
Howard's probable illegitimate son Robert was recognised by his mother's husband as his son and heir. He became 2nd Viscount Purbeck, after the first Lord Purbeck's death on 18 February 1657; but Robert renounced his claim to the title in 1658. He was again declared Viscount Purbeck by the House of Lords in 1660, but was declared not entitled to the honour in 1678, on the grounds that his birth was illegitimate. Upon marriage Robert took the name of his wife and became known as Robert Danvers.
