= Williams baronets of Elham (1674) =

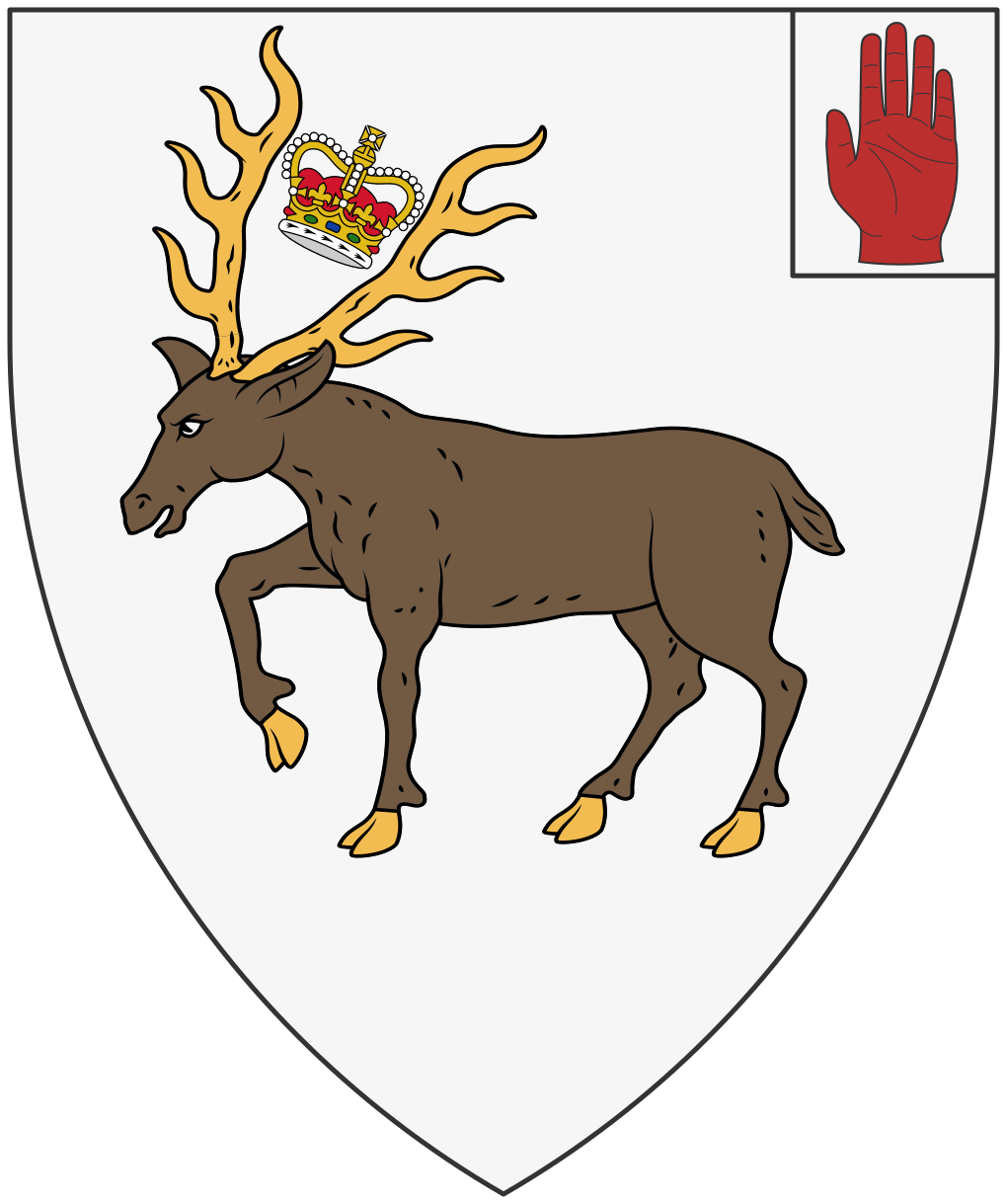
Escutcheon of the Williams baronets of Elham

The Williams baronetcy, of Elham in the County of Kent, was created in the Baronetage of England on 12 November 1674 for Thomas Williams, physician in ordinary to Charles I and James II. He was later Member of Parliament for Weobley 1675–8.

His son, the 2nd Baronet was High Sheriff of Kent in 1668 and represented Herefordshire 1701–5. His nephew succeeded as the 3rd Baronet, while the Elham estate passed to his daughter and her husband Thomas Symonds. The 4th and 5th Baronets were sons of the 3rd Baronet. On the latter's death in 1804, the title became either extinct or dormant.

== Williams baronets, of Elham (1674) ==
- Sir Thomas Williams, 1st Baronet (c. 1621–1712)
- Sir John Williams, 2nd Baronet (1653–1723)
- Sir David Williams, 3rd Baronet (1659–1740)
- Sir Henry Williams, 4th Baronet (died 1741)
- Sir Edward Williams, 5th Baronet (died 1804)
