= William Peere Williams (1664–1736) =

English politician

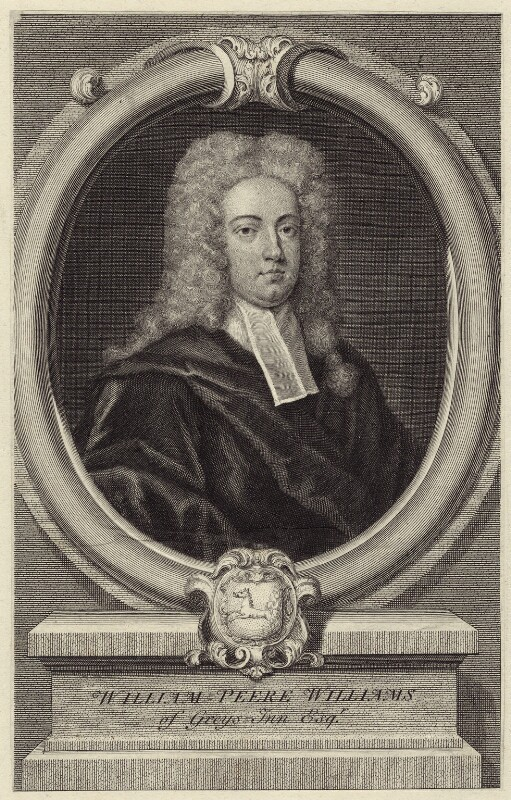
A 1740 engraving of Williams

William Peere Williams (c. 1664 – 10 June 1736) was an English politician. He was Member of Parliament for Bishop's Castle from 1722 to 1727. Williams was born in Greyfriars, Chichester, Sussex, England to Peere Williams and Joanna Oyley.

William married Anne Hutchins, daughter of Sir George Hutchins. They had four sons: Hutchins Williams, Frederick, William-Peere, George and two daughters: Anne Williams, and Louisa .

Parliament of Great Britain
Preceded by Sir Matthew Decker, Bt; Charles Mason	Member of Parliament for Bishop's Castle; 1722 – 1727; With: Bowater Vernon 1722–6; Charles Mason 1726–7	Succeeded by Robert More; John Plumptre
