= Thomas Hill (Shrewsbury MP) =

18th century English elected official

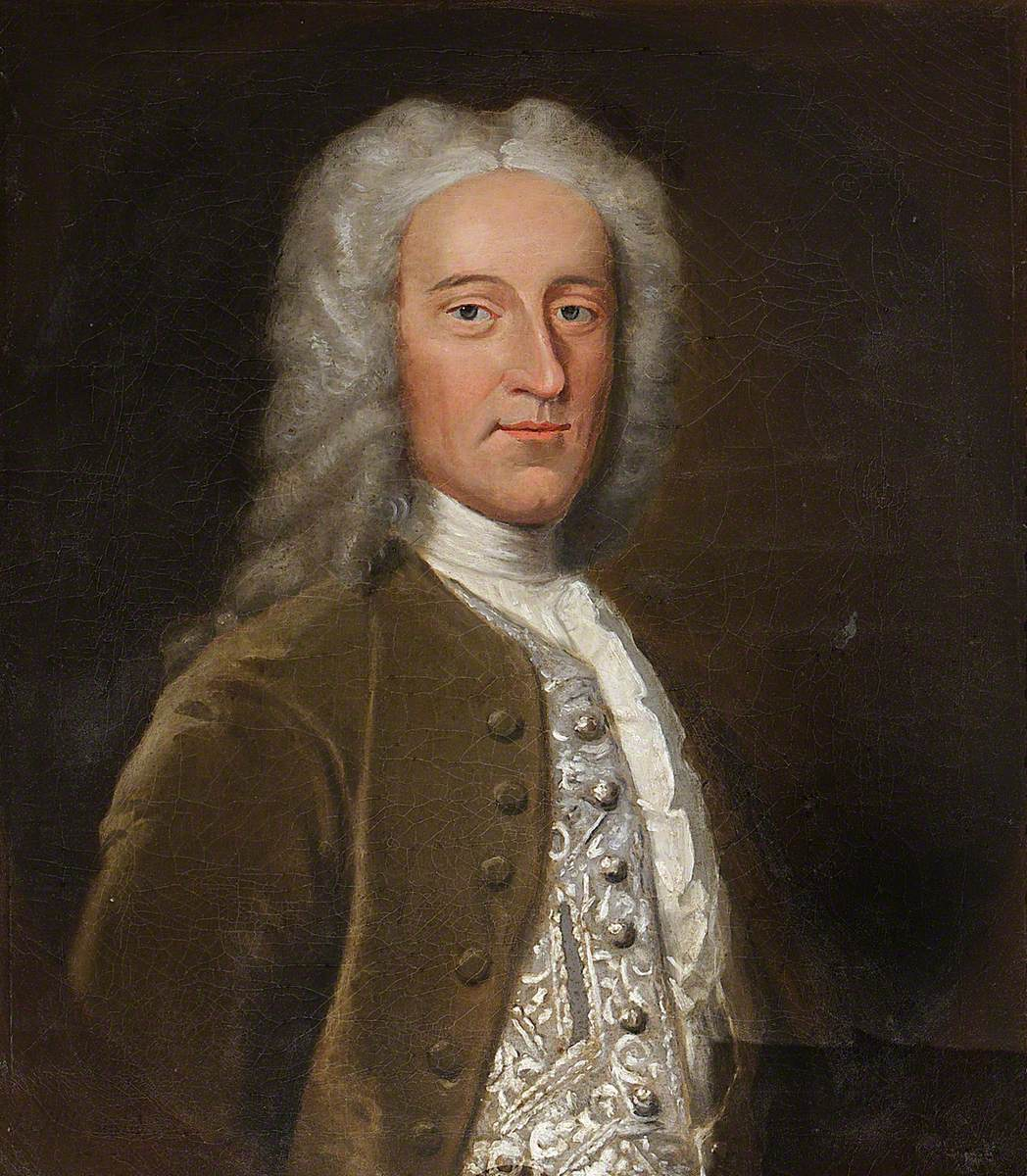

Thomas Hill, born Harwood (1693-11 June 1782}, was one of the two MPs for Shrewsbury in the British parliament from 1749 to 1768. He was nephew to the financier Richard Hill of Hawkstone, from whom he took his surname and was succeeded by his son Noel Hill.

Parliament of the United Kingdom
Preceded by Richard Corbet; William Kinaston	Member of Parliament for Shrewsbury; 1749–1768; With: Richard Corbet; Robert More; Robert Clive	Succeeded by Robert Clive and Noel Hill
