= Williams baronets of Marnhull (1642) =

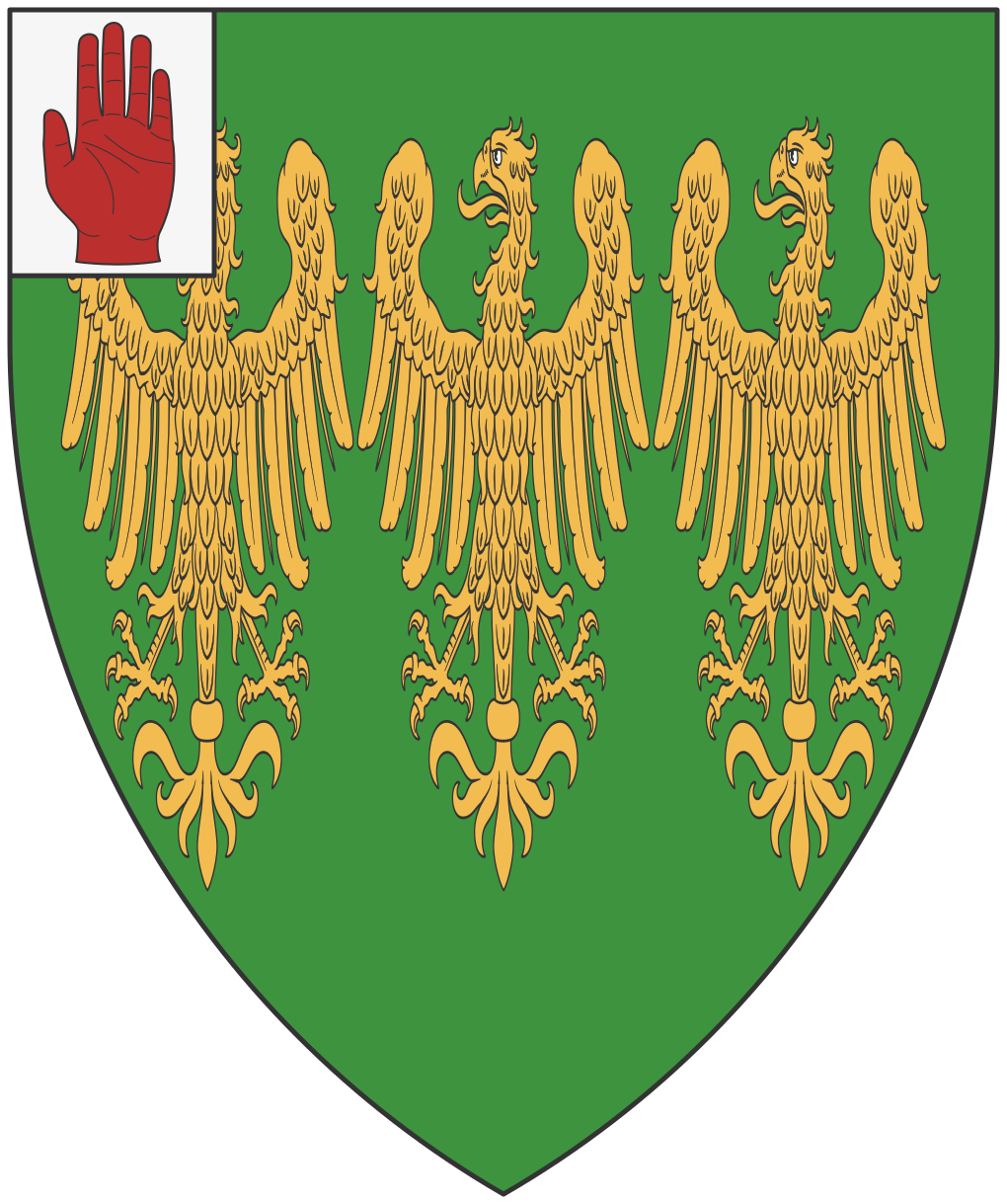
Escutcheon of the Williams baronets of Marnhull

The Williams baronetcy, of Marnhull in the County of Dorset, was created in the Baronetage of England on 19 April 1642 for the courtier Edmund Williams, Gentleman of the Privy Chamber to Charles I of England. The title became extinct on the death of the 2nd Baronet in 1680.

== Williams baronets, of Marnhull (1642) ==
- Sir Edmund Williams, 1st Baronet (died 1644). He married Mary Beaumont, fourth daughter of Sir John Beaumont, 1st Baronet.
- Sir John Williams, 2nd Baronet (1642–1680). He was heir to the estate of Sir John Williams, 1st Baronet of Minster, his uncle, and married in 1673 Susan Skipwith, daughter of Sir Thomas Skipwith, 1st Baronet. He left no male heir.
