= Walter Waring (Bishop's Castle MP) =

English politician and MP (1667–1724)

Member of the House of Commons
- Constituency: Bishop's Castle
- In office 1689–1690
- In office 17 May 1690 – 1695

Personal details
- Born: 5 December 1667
- Died: June 1725 (aged 57)
- Spouse: Abigail (m. 1694; died 1753)

Walter Waring (1667–1725) was an English landowner and politician who sat in the House of Commons in the late 17th and early 18th centuries. He represented a parliamentary constituency as a Member of Parliament and was active in local and national political affairs during his lifetime.

Waring was born 5 December 1667, to Edmund and Mary Waring. On 29 May 1694, Waring married Abigail Morgan, who died in 1753. The couple had no children. According to The History of Parliament, Waring died in 1724, though the Bishop's Castle parish register records the burial of "Walter Waring Esqr" on 25 June 1725, and his probate was executed 14 August 1725. He was associated with the Waring family of Owlbury Hall in Shropshire, a landed gentry family with parliamentary connections.
