= Robert Sacheverell =

Member of Parliament for Nottingham
- In office 29 November 1699 – 1700
- In office 10 June 1701 – 1702
- In office 1705–1708
- In office 1710 – 8 December 1714

Personal details
- Born: 1669
- Died: 8 December 1714 (aged 44–45)
- Parent: William Sacheverell

Robert Sacheverell (1669 – 8 December 1714) was an English politician who served as a Member of Parliament (MP).

== Biography ==
His father William Sacheverell was also an MP.

== See also ==
- List of members of the House of Commons at Westminster 1705–1708
- List of MPs elected in the 1710 British general election
- List of MPs elected in the 1713 British general election
