= Charles Mason (MP) =

Welsh politician (1661–1739)

Charles Mason (1661 – 1739) was a Welsh politician. He sat as MP for Bishop's Castle from 1695 till 13 May 1701, December 1701 till 31 March 1702, 1702 till 1705, Montgomery Boroughs from 1705 till 1708, Bishop's Castle from 1708 till 1710, 1715 till 1722, 26 April 1726 till 1727. Mason had spoken against bribery within the Bishop's Castle borough, an area of Shropshire known for corruption.

He was baptised on 15 April 1661. He was the second but oldest surviving son of Thomas Mason (died 1705). He married and had one son.
