= John Haslem =

John Haslem may refer to:

- John Haslem (politician)
- John Haslem (artist)
