= Thomas Horner =

Thomas Horner may refer to:

- Thomas Strangways Horner, English MP for Somerset in 1713 and 1727
- Thomas Hornor (surveyor) (1785–1844)
- Thomas Horner, man connected to "Little Jack Horner", a nursery rhyme
- Thomas Horner, a character (an armorer) in the play Henry VI, Part 2 by Shakespeare
