= George Chambers (painter) =

English painter (1803–1840)

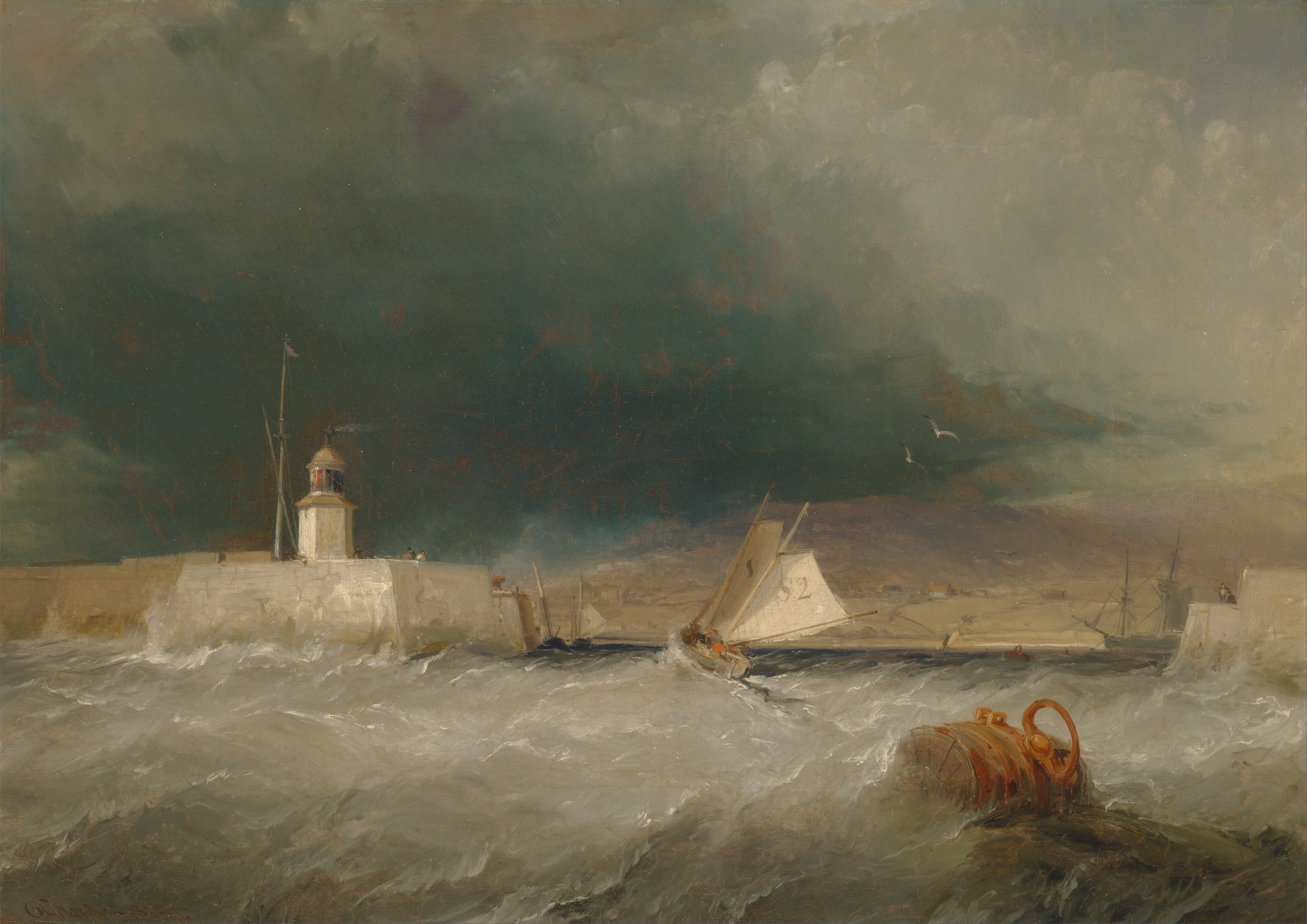
Port on a Stormy Day

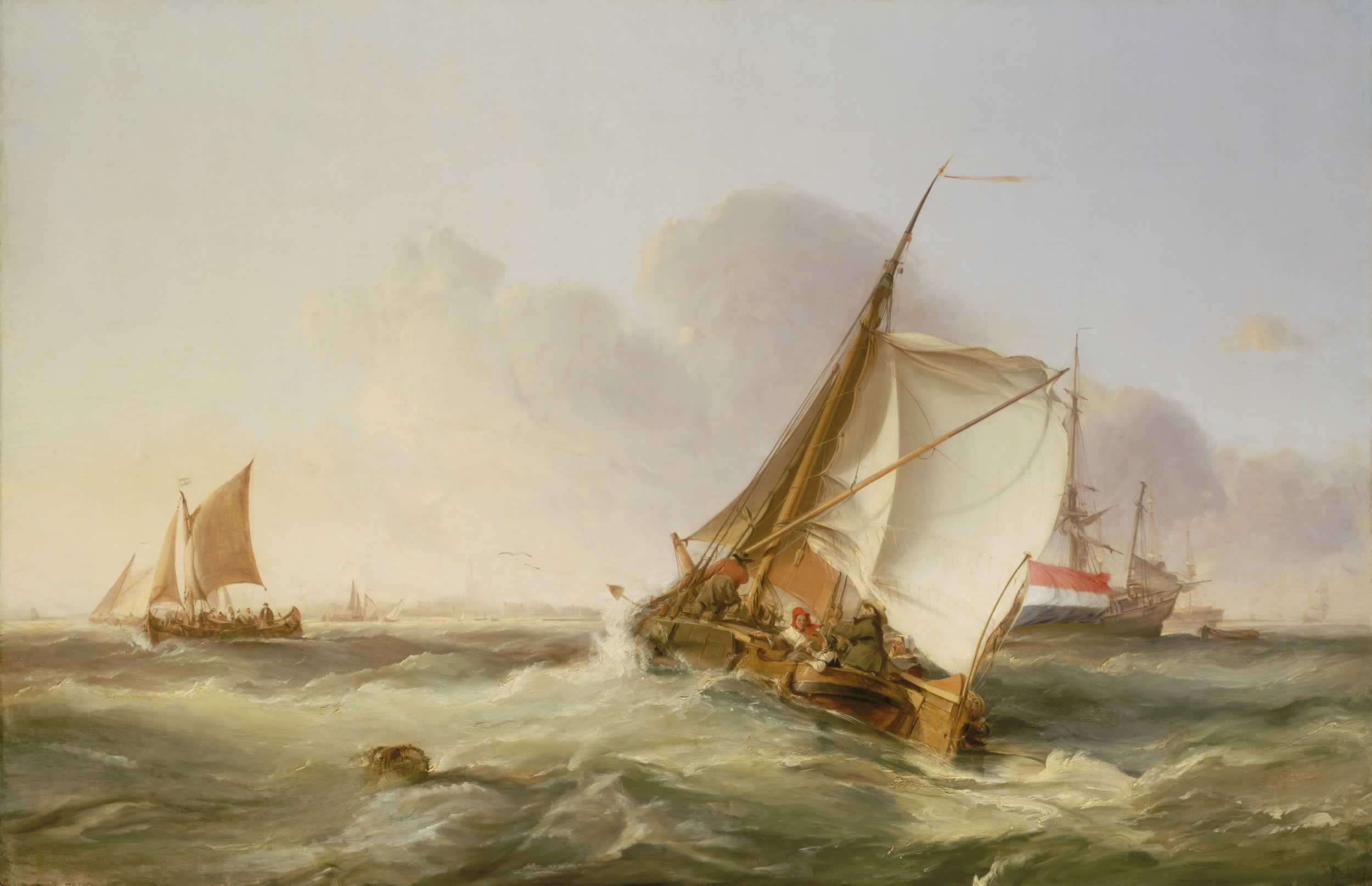
A Dutch Boeier in a Fresh Breeze (1831, oil on canvas, National Maritime Museum, London).

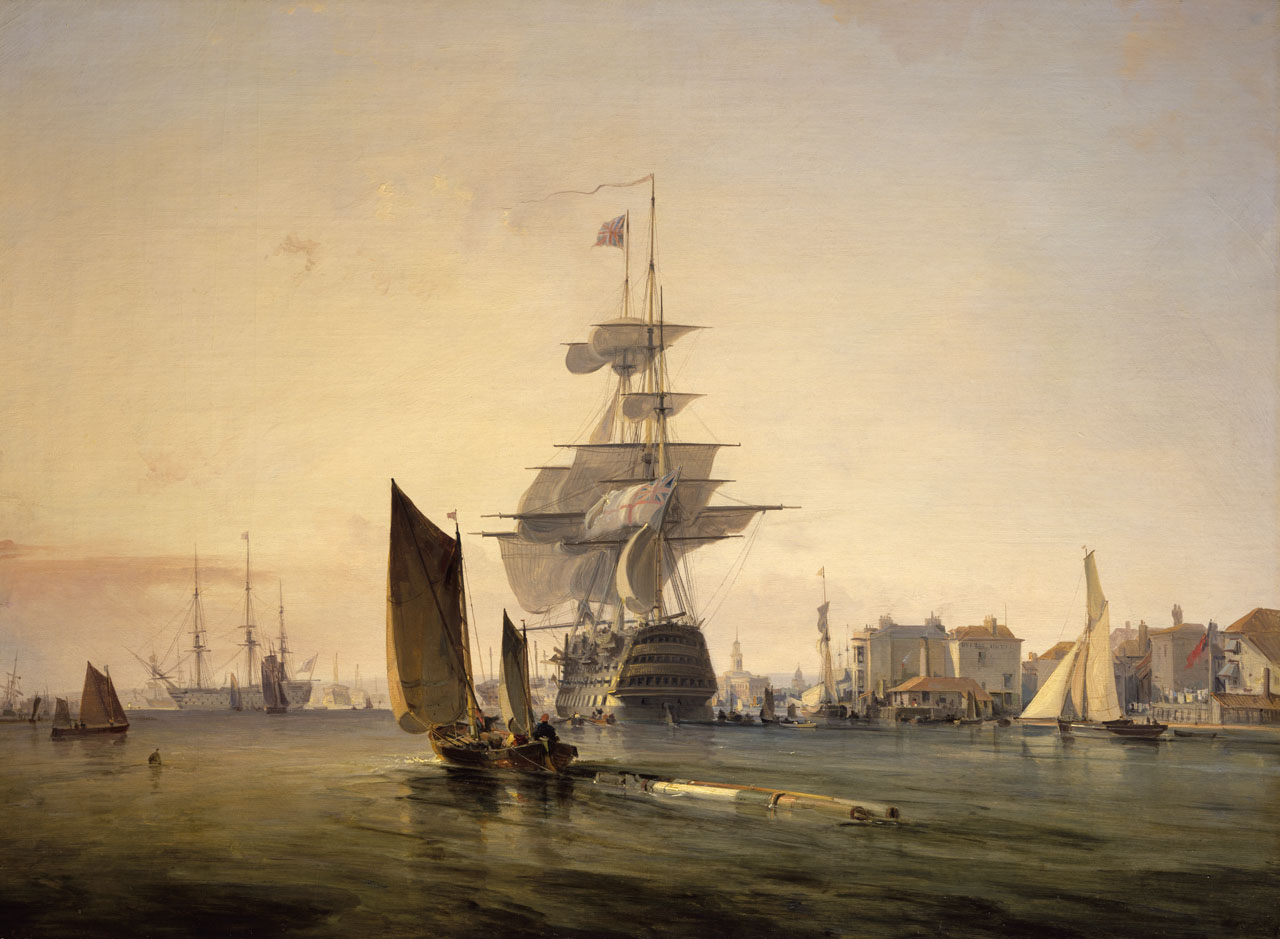
HMS Britannia entering Portsmouth, 1835.

George Hyde Chambers (23 October 1803 – 29 October 1840) was an English painter who specialised in marine art.

== Life and work ==
Chambers was born in a poor working-class area of Whitby, Yorkshire, the second son of a seaman; his mother took in lodgers. At the age of 8 years, he was working on the coal sloops in the town harbour. At the age of 10, he served as a cabin boy on a coasting vessel, and was afterwards apprenticed to the master of a brig trading in the Mediterranean and Baltic. He proved to have an innate talent for art, and so impressed local captains and crews with his decoration of their ships, that the ship-owner released him from his apprenticeship so that he could devote himself full-time to painting. Returning to Whitby, he took up employment as a house painter and took lessons in drawing in his spare time.

Chambers worked his way on a trading vessel to London in 1825, where he was greatly helped by Christopher Crawford, formerly of Whitby, but then landlord of the Waterman's Arms at Wapping. His work, hanging in the gentlemen's parlour of the inn, proved popular with its nautical clientele and won Chambers his early commissions, although he also worked as a scene-painter (1827–28) on Thomas Hornor’s Panorama of London at the London Colosseum in Regent's Park, and at the Pavilion Theatre, Whitechapel (1830–31). In 1829, two of his pictures were purchased by Admiral Thomas Capel who drew his merits to the attention of other officers including Admiral Lord Mark Kerr. The latter in turn secured him the patronage of King William IV and Queen Adelaide in 1831–32 and thereafter Chambers was an established artist. He only showed three works at the Royal Academy 1828–29 and 1838, but many more at the British Institution, 1827–40, the Society of British Artists 1829–38 and the Old Water-colour Society, 1834–40, of which he was elected member in 1834.

Chambers was a talented draughtsman and watercolourist and an accomplished painter in oils, often working with fluent, colourful bravura in such views as A Fresh Breeze off Cowes and A Dutch Boier in a Fresh Breeze (National Maritime Museum, Greenwich), the latter a product of his one substantial artistic tour to the Netherlands in 1837. His most important later ‘set-piece’ commission was The Bombardment of Algiers, 1816 by Lord Exmouth, commissioned by the admiral's friends for the Naval Gallery at Greenwich Hospital in 1836 (and now in the National Maritime Museum) probably through the agency of E.H. Locker of the hospital, Exmouth's former secretary. He also painted two other pictures for the Gallery.

Chambers’ career was hampered by personal diffidence in promoting himself and, when he began to succeed, cut short by chronic ill health. A voyage to Madeira in the summer of 1840 failed to bring improvements and he died of heart failure at Brighton on 29 October 1840.

He left a widow and three children. His two sons, George William Crawford Chambers (1829–1878) and William Henry Chambers (1834–1890) were also marine painters. His younger brother, Thomas, became a marine and landscape painter in the United States.
