= William Carver =

William Carver may refer to:

- William Carver (politician) (1868–1961), British Conservative Party politician, Member of Parliament (MP) for Howdenshire 1926–1947
- William Carver (Wild Bunch) (1868–1901), American outlaw during the closing years of the Old West
- William Frank Carver (1840–1927), US sharpshooter
