= Edmund Thomas Parris =

English painter (1793–1873)

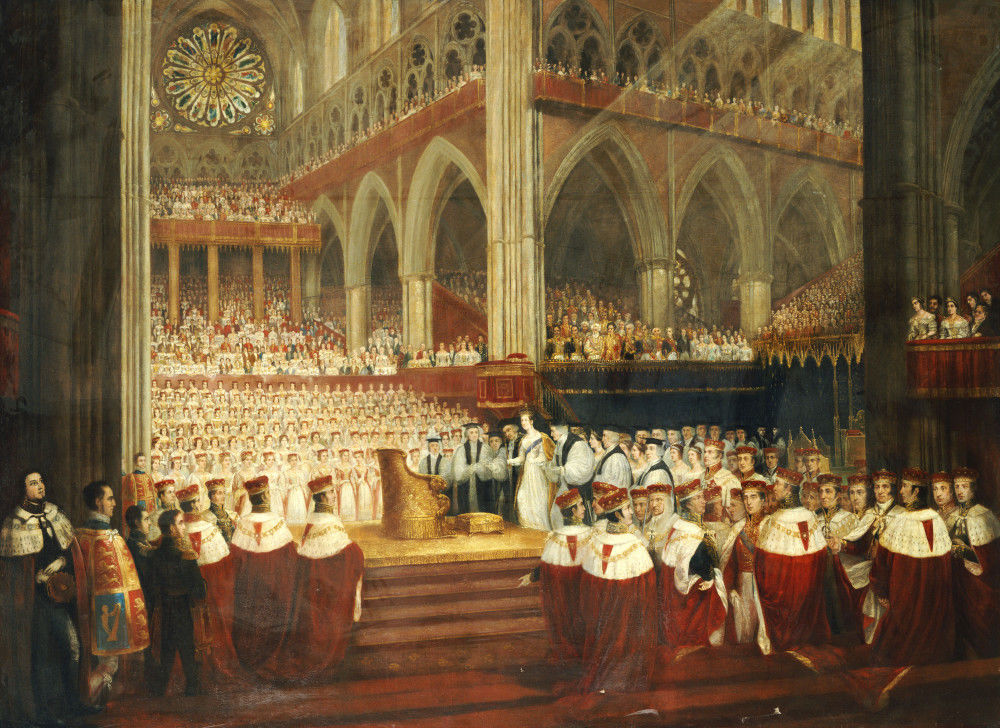
Coronation of Queen Victoria, 1838

Edmund Thomas Parris (3 June 1793 – 27 November 1873) was an English history, portrait, subject, and panorama painter, book illustrator, designer and art restorer. He was appointed history painter to Queen Adelaide, Queen Consort of William IV, and painted Queen Victoria's coronation in 1838 and the Duke of Wellington's funeral in 1852. He supervised the painting of the huge panorama in the London Colosseum in Regent's Park, London, and was the inventor of "Parris's medium".

== Life and work ==
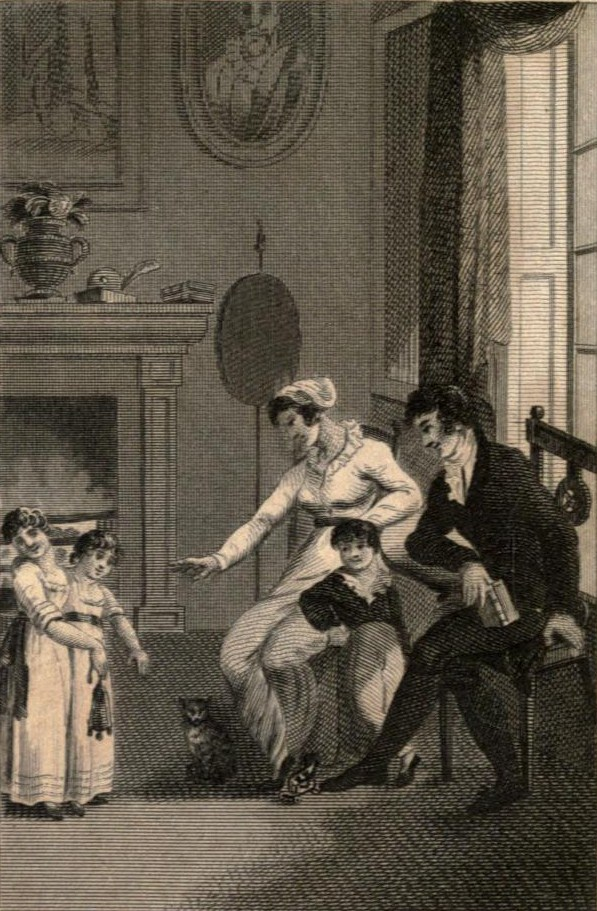
Frontispiece from "The Blue silk work bag and its contents" (1817, engraving by J W Archer)

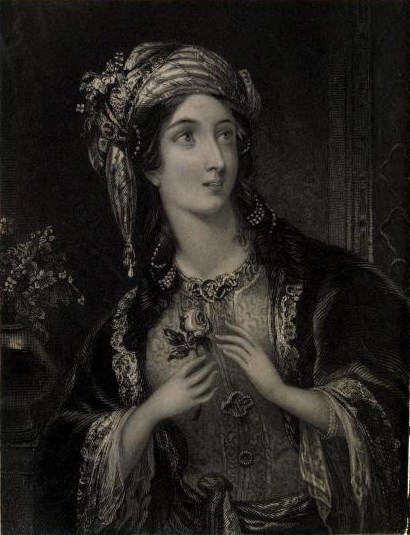
The Sultan's Daughter (engraving by H. Cook after Parris)

Parris, was born in the parish of St. Marylebone, London on 3 June 1793, the son of Edward and Grace Parris. He showed an early talent for art and was placed with Jewellers "Ray and Montague" (John Ray and James Montague), to learn enamel-painting and metal-chasing. During his apprenticeship, his leisure time was given to the study of mechanics, which subsequently proved to be of great use to him.

In 1816 he entered the schools of the Royal Academy, and commenced the study of anatomy under Dr. Carpue. His first important picture, "Christ blessing little Children", was exhibited at the Royal Academy in 1824. In that year, when the proposal was first made to undertake the restoration of James Thornhill's paintings in the cupola of St. Paul's Cathedral, Parris devised an ingenious apparatus for gaining access to them which attracted much attention, and led to his engagement by Thomas Hornor to assist him in the production of his panorama of London at the Colosseum, for which he had been making sketches since 1820. Upon this immense work, which covered nearly an acre of canvas and presented formidable artistic and mechanical challenges, Parris laboured incessantly for four years, completing it in November 1829.

Soon after he painted, in conjunction with William Daniell, R.A., a panorama of Madras, for which he also constructed a building. A wholly different class of art, in which Parris gained a great temporary reputation, was the portrayal of female beauty, and he was for some years a fashionable portrait painter. His picture "The Bridesmaid", which was exhibited at the British Institution in 1830, and purchased by Sir Robert Peel, became very popular through the engraving by James Bromley (engraver); and many of his single figures and groups, composed in the same weak, sentimental style, were engraved in the "Keepsake" and similar publications.

In 1836 and 1838 three sets of plates from his drawings were published, entitled respectively, "Flowers of loveliness", "Gems of Beauty", and "The Passions", with illustrative verses by Lady Blessington; he also provided illustrations for her "Confessions of an Elderly Gentleman" (1836), and "Confessions of an Elderly Lady" (1838), to much popular approval. His illustrations were also used in several other books.

On Queen Victoria's first state visit to Drury Lane Theatre in November 1837, Parris, from a seat in the orchestra, made a sketch of her as she stood in her box, and from this painted a portrait, of which an engraving, by Charles Edward Wagstaff, was published by Hodgson & Graves in the following April. In 1838 he was commissioned by the same firm to paint a picture of the Queen's coronation, and he received sittings for this purpose from the Queen and all the chief personages who were present; a print of this, also executed by Wagstaff, appeared in 1842. At the cartoon competition in Westminster Hall in 1843, Parris gained a prize of £100. for his "Joseph of Arimathsea converting the Britons".

In 1852, he painted the Duke of Wellington's funeral. Also in that year, the proposal to restore Thornhill's paintings in St. Paul's was revived and the commission given to Parris, who, bringing into use the scaffold he had designed for the purpose nearly thirty years before, commenced the task in 1853, and completed it in July 1856. Opinions about the appropriateness of Parris's restoration were divided, with one critic W. A. J. Archbold commenting that "the state of decay into which Thornhill's work had fallen rendered some kind of reparation necessary, but the complete repainting carried out by Parris almost wholly deprived it of such interest as it ever possessed".

Parris was a frequent exhibitor of historical and fancy subjects at the Royal Academy and British Institution from 1816 to the end of his life, and in 1832 received the appointment of historical painter to Queen Adelaide. Throughout his career his untiring industry and great facility of invention led him to engage in almost every description of artistic work, and he made innumerable designs for stained-glass windows, carpets, screens, etc. He assisted Robert Smirke in preparing Westminster Abbey for the coronation of William IV, and was much employed in decorating the mansions of the nobility.

One of his last important undertakings was the preparation of a model for a piece of tapestry, forty feet long, for the Paris exhibition of 1867. At one time Parris carried on a life-drawing school at his house in Grafton Street, Bond Street. He invented a medium which, when mixed with oil, produced a dull fresco-like surface; this was widely known as "Parris's Medium."

Edmund Thomas Parris died at 27 Francis Street, Bedford Square, London, on 27 November 1873.

John Haslem (1808–1884), a porcelain and enamel painter, was a pupil of Parris's.

== Selected publications ==
- Countess of Blessington, Gems of Beauty Displayed in a Series of Twelve Highly Finished Engravings by E. T. Parris, Esq. (London: Longman, Rees, Orme, Brown, Green and Longman, 1836)
