= 1926 Howdenshire by-election =

UK parliamentary by-election

The 1926 Howdenshire by-election was a parliamentary by-election for the British House of Commons constituency of Howdenshire in Yorkshire on 25 November 1926.

== Vacancy ==
The by-election was caused by the resignation of the sitting Conservative MP, Hon. F.S. Jackson on 3 November 1926. He had been MP here since winning the seat in the 1915 Howdenshire by-election.

== Election history ==
The constituency was created in 1885 and had been won by the Unionist candidate at every election to date. The result at the last general election was

General election 1924: Howdenshire
Party	Candidate	Votes	%	±%
Unionist	Stanley Jackson	Unopposed	N/A	N/A
Unionist hold				

Previously, the only recent contested elections had seen an Agriculture candidate easily beaten in 1922 and a Liberal beaten with the help of the Coalition coupon in 1918.

== Candidates ==
58-year-old William Carver had been the prearranged candidate of the Howdenshire Unionist Association. He had been in business in Hull since 1890 and had been President of the Hull Chamber of Commerce since 1925. He had been a member of the East Riding County Council since 1915. He was standing for parliament for the first time.

65-year-old Frederick Linfield was hurriedly chosen by the Liberals to fight the seat. He had sat as Liberal MP for Mid Bedfordshire from 1922 to 1923 when he was defeated. He had stood there again at the last general election. In 1924 he was appointed as a Member of the East African Parliamentary Commission. The report of the Parliamentary Commission was published in May 1925 and various proposals for development and reform were put forward. Linfield also wrote a 13-page supplementary memorandum to the report in which he proposed the setting up of an Imperial Development Board. He followed this up with an article in the Contemporary Review of March 1926 on ‘Empire Development’.

A Labour candidate, John Kneeshaw also emerged. He had been the Labour candidate for Birmingham Ladywood in 1918, finishing second.

== Campaign ==
The resigning MP, F.S. Jackson was Chairman of the Conservative Party which meant that the party both locally and nationally were not caught unprepared about the vacancy and they were able to move swiftly to announce a polling day of 26 November, just 22 days after his resignation. Thus the campaign was very short, leaving little time for the opposition parties to respond. A keen fight was anticipated, especially on land and agricultural issues in what was to be a three-cornered contest.

== Result ==
On polling day it was reported that voting was interfered with by fog and early polling was very light. Carver held the seat for the Unionists, while the Labour candidate losing his deposit.

Howdenshire by-election, 1926
Party	Candidate	Votes	%	±%
Unionist	William Carver	10,653	54.2	N/A
Liberal	Frederick Linfield	6,668	34.0	New
Labour	John William Kneeshaw	2,318	11.8	New
Majority		3,985	20.2	N/A
Turnout		19,639	73.6	N/A
Unionist hold		Swing	N/A	

== Aftermath ==
Established as the main challengers, the Liberals, with a new candidate, at the 1929 general election just failed to unseat Carver. Linfield stood at Horncastle and came second. Kneeshaw did not stand for parliament again and the Labour Party did not field a candidate at Howdenshire again until 1935. The result at the following general election;

General election 1929: Howdenshire
Party	Candidate	Votes	%	±%
Unionist	William Carver	13,823	51.2	−3.0
Liberal	Edward Baker	13,170	48.8	+14.8
Majority		653	2.4	−17.8
Turnout		26,933	76.8	+3.2
Unionist hold		Swing	-8.9	

== See also ==
- List of United Kingdom by-elections
- United Kingdom by-election records
