= Imperial War Museum (disambiguation) =

The Imperial War Museum is a British national museum organisation with branches at five locations in England.

Imperial War Museum may also refer to:

- Imperial War Museum Duxford, the museum's branch in Duxford, Cambridgeshire
- Imperial War Museum North, the museum's branch in Trafford, Greater Manchester
  - Imperial War Museum tram stop, a Metrolink tram stop serving the above museum

== See also ==
- Imperial War Museum stamp collection, a stamp collection owned by the museum
