= Arthur Duncombe =

Arthur Duncombe may refer to:

- Arthur Duncombe (Royal Navy officer), British naval commander and Conservative politician
- Arthur Duncombe (1840–1911), British Conservative politician, son of the above
