= William Harrison-Broadley =

British politician

William Henry Harrison-Broadley (August 1820 – 1896) was a British Conservative politician who sat in the House of Commons from 1868 to 1885.

Harrison-Broadley was the son of William Henry Harrison of Ripon and Sinderly and his wife Mary Broadley, daughter of Henry Broadley of Ferriby, and sister of Henry Broadley of Welton, who was M.P. for the East Riding of Yorkshire from 1837 to 1851. He was educated at Rugby School and at Brasenose College, Oxford. In 1865 he assumed by royal licence the additional surname of Broadley on inheriting Welton House from the Broadley family. He was High Sheriff of Yorkshire in 1867 and was a JP and a D.L. for the East Riding of Yorkshire, and Lieutenant-Colonel of the Yorkshire Hussars. He was patron of the livings of Melton-cum-Welton, Sutton St James and Bempton Yorkshire.

At the 1868 general election, Harrison-Broadley was elected as Member of Parliament (MP) for the East Riding of Yorkshire. He held the seat until the constituency was divided under the Redistribution of Seats Act 1885.

When he died unmarried, Welton House passed to his nephew, Henry Broadley Harrison-Broadley.

Parliament of the United Kingdom
Preceded by Hon. Arthur Duncombe; The Lord Hotham	Member of Parliament for East Riding of Yorkshire; 1868–1885; With: Christopher Sykes	Constituency divided See Buckrose, Holderness and Howdenshire
Honorary titles
Preceded by Charles Sabine Augustus Thellusson	High Sheriff of Yorkshire; 1867	Succeeded by Sir John Ramsden
