= Wilson-Todd baronets =

Extinct baronetcy in the Baronetage of the United Kingdom

Escutcheon of the Wilson-Todd baronets

The Wilson-Todd Baronetcy, of Halnaby Hall in the Parish of Croft in the North Riding of the County of York and of Tranby Park in the Parish of Kirkella in the East Riding of the County of York, was a title in the Baronetage of the United Kingdom. It was created on 31 August 1903 for William Wilson-Todd, Conservative Member of Parliament for Howdenshire.

The title became extinct on the death of the 2nd Baronet in 1925, leaving no heir.

== Wilson-Todd baronets, of Halnaby Hall and Tranby Park (1903) ==
- Sir William Henry Wilson-Todd, 1st Baronet (1828–1910)
- Sir William Pierrepont Wilson-Todd, 2nd Baronet (1857–1925)

== See also ==
- Wilson-Todd collection

Baronetage of the United Kingdom
Preceded by Rasch baronets	Wilson-Todd baronets of Halnaby Hall and Tranby Park; 31 August 1903	Succeeded by Dixon baronets
