= Henry Broadley =

British politician

Henry Broadley (1793–1851) was a British Conservative politician who sat in the House of Commons from 1837 to 1851.

== Life ==
Broadley was a member of the Broadley family of merchants, bankers and landowners of Hull. He was the third son of Henry Broadley RN, born at Hull. He was educated at Sedbergh School, and matriculated at Trinity College, Cambridge in 1812, graduating B.A. in 1816 and M.A. in 1819.

He was first chairman of the Hull and Selby Railway Company from 1836 to 1843.

At the 1837 general election, Broadley was elected Member of Parliament for East Riding of Yorkshire and held it until his death in 1851.

Broadley bought Welton House, Yorkshire, in 1848. On his death it passed to his sister, Sophia Broadley, who died in 1864, and then to his nephew William Harrison-Broadley. When he also died unmarried it passed to his nephew, Henry Broadley Harrison-Broadley.

Parliament of the United Kingdom
| Preceded by Paul Thompson; Richard Bethell | Member of Parliament for East Riding of Yorkshire; 1837–1851; With: Richard Bethell 1837–1841; The Lord Hotham 1841–1851 | Succeeded by Hon. Arthur Duncombe; The Lord Hotham |
