= Beaumont Hotham, 3rd Baron Hotham =

British Army general

General The Right Honourable The Lord Hotham
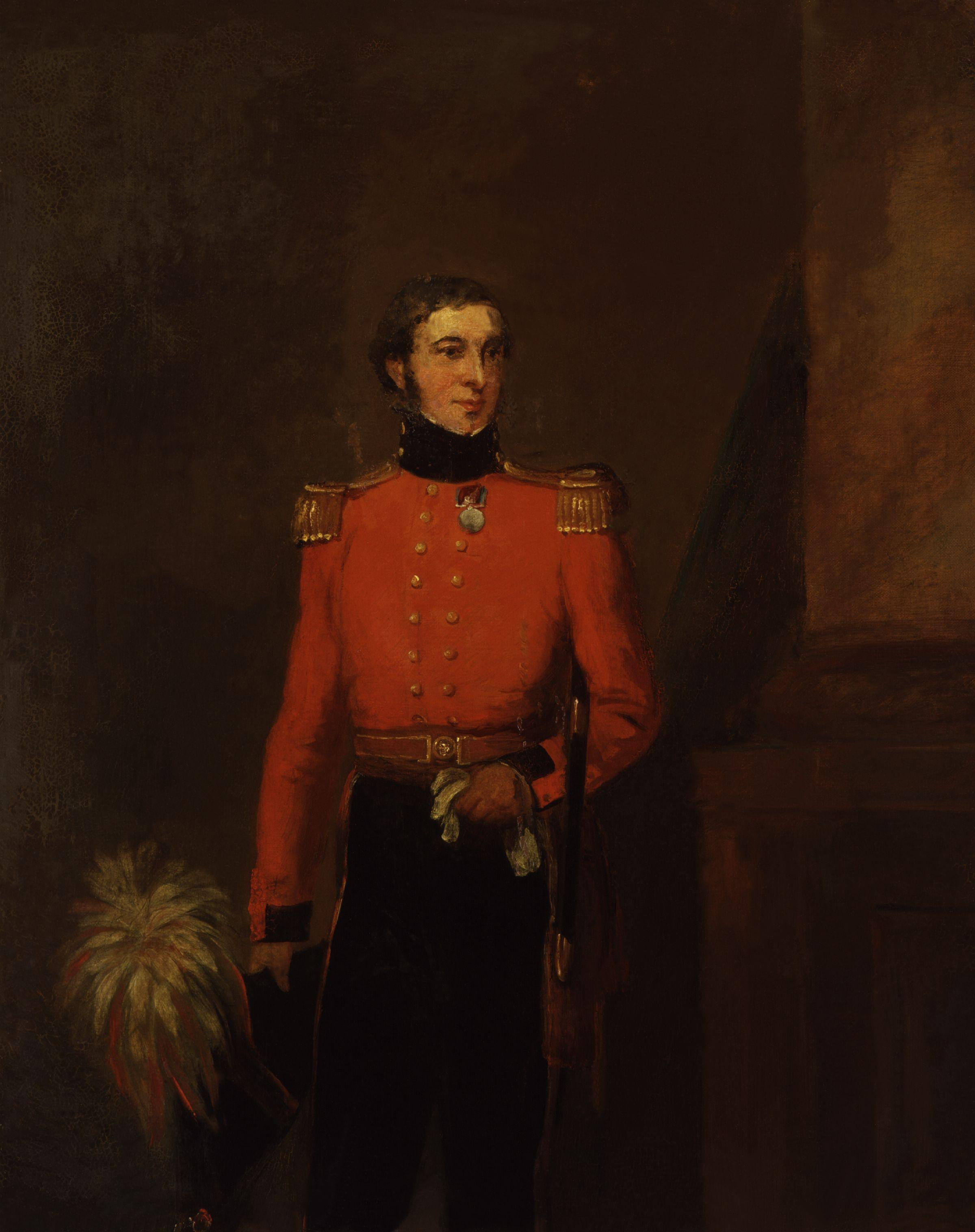
- Born: Beaumont Hotham; 9 August 1794
- Died: 12 December 1870 (aged 76)

Beaumont Hotham, 3rd Baron Hotham (9 August 1794 – 12 December 1870) was a British Army officer, peer and long-standing Conservative Member of Parliament.

== Biography ==
Hotham was the son of Lieutenant-colonel Beaumont Hotham of South Dalton, East Riding of Yorkshire and Philadelphia Dyke. His father died when he was five years old. He was educated at Westminster School.

He joined the army as an ensign in the Coldstream Guards in 1810, and was promoted to captain in 1813, major in 1819, lieut.-colonel in 1825; colonel in 1838, major-general in 1851, lieut.-general in 1858 and full general in 1865. He fought in the Peninsular campaign of 1812–1814, including the Battle of Salamanca and the Battle of Vitoria and was at the Battle of Waterloo in 1815.

In 1814 he succeeded his grandfather as third Baron Hotham, but as this was an Irish peerage it did not entitle him to a seat in the House of Lords. He was instead elected to the House of Commons for Leominster in 1820, a seat he held, with a brief exception for a few months in 1831, until 1841, and then represented the East Riding of Yorkshire between 1841 and 1868. By the time he retired from the House of Commons, he was one of the longest-serving members of Parliament.

In 1861 he rebuilt at his own expense the St Mary's Church, South Dalton, near the family seat of Dalton Hall.

Lord Hotham died in December 1870, aged 76, and was buried in his church at South Dalton. He never married and was succeeded in his titles and estates by his nephew Charles.

Parliament of the United Kingdom
Preceded by Sir John Lubbock; John Harcourt	Member of Parliament for Leominster; 1820 – May 1831; With: Sir William Cuninghame-Fairlie 1820–1826; Thomas Bish 1826–1827; Rowland Stephenson 1827–1830; John Ward 1830; William Marshall 1830–1831	Succeeded by William Bertram Evans; Thomas Brayen
Preceded by William Bertram Evans; Thomas Brayen	Member of Parliament for Leominster; December 1831 – 1841; With: William Bertram Evans 1831–1832; Thomas Bish 1832–1837; Charles Greenaway 1837–1841	Succeeded by Charles Greenaway; James Wigram
Preceded by Richard Bethell; Henry Broadley	Member of Parliament for the East Riding of Yorkshire; 1841–1868; With: Henry Broadley 1841–1851; Arthur Duncombe 1851–1868	Succeeded by Christopher Sykes; William Harrison-Broadley
Peerage of Ireland
Preceded by Beaumont Hotham	Baron Hotham; 1814–1870	Succeeded by Charles Hotham
