= George Odey =

British politician (1900–1985)

George Odey CBE, DL

Member of Parliament for Beverley Howdenshire (1947–1950)
- In office 27 November 1947 – 6 May 1955
- Preceded by: Clifford Glossop
- Succeeded by: Constituency abolished

Personal details
- Born: George William Odey; 21 April 1900
- Died: 16 October 1985 (aged 85)
- Party: Conservative
- Relatives: Crispin Odey (grandson)
- Education: University College London

George William Odey CBE DL (21 April 1900 – 16 October 1985) was a business leader in the United Kingdom leather tanning industry who held the post of chairman of the Barrow Hepburn Group from 1937 until 1974. He was also a Conservative Party politician who served as a Member of Parliament (MP) from 1947 to 1955.

He was educated at Faversham Grammar School and University College London.

He was elected as MP for the Howdenshire constituency at a by-election in 1947. When that constituency was abolished in boundary changes for the 1950 general election, he was returned to the House of Commons for the newly recreated Beverley constituency, and held the seat until its abolition for the 1955 general election.

On 18 November 1952 he was made Honorary Air Commodore of No. 3505 (East Riding) Fighter Control Unit, Royal Auxiliary Air Force. On 7 February 1977 he was made a Deputy Lieutenant for the County of Humberside.

== Sources ==
- Craig, F. W. S. (1983) [1969]. British parliamentary election results 1918-1949 (3rd ed.). Chichester: Parliamentary Research Services. ISBN 0-900178-06-X.
- Leigh Rayment's Historical List of MPs

Parliament of the United Kingdom
Preceded by Clifford Glossop	Member of Parliament for Howdenshire; 1947–1950	Constituency abolished
New constituency	Member of Parliament for Beverley; 1950–1955	Constituency abolished
