= Hugh Bethell (died 1679) =

Member of Parliament and High Sheriff

Sir Hugh Bethell (1 October 1615 – 3 October 1679) was an English politician who sat in the House of Commons at various times between 1654 and 1679.

Bethell was the eldest son of Hugh Bethell of Rise and his wife Ellen Johnston, daughter of Thomas Johnston of Bishop Burton. He was a captain of horse in the parliamentary army by 1643 and subsequently became a colonel. He commanded a regiment at Marston Moor, where he lost an eye. In 1645 he was a commissioner for the northern association for the East Riding of Yorkshire. He was commissioner for militia in 1649 and was governor of Scarborough Castle from about 1649 to 1651. Also in 1649 he became J.P. for the East Riding of Yorkshire until 1676 and was commissioner for assessment for the East Riding of Yorkshire. From 1650 to 1652 he was commissioner for assessment for Yorkshire. He was High Sheriff of Yorkshire from 1652 to 1653.

In 1654, Bethell was elected Member of Parliament for East Riding of Yorkshire in the First Protectorate Parliament. He was also commissioner for scandalous ministers for East Riding and Hull in 1654. In 1656 he was re-elected MP for East Riding for the Second Protectorate Parliament. He was commissioner for assessment for the East Riding of Yorkshire and became JP for Beverley in 1657. In 1659 he succeeded to the estates on the death of his father. He was commissioner for militia in 1659 and took part in a rising against the military government. He was captain of horse from January to November 1660 when he took over the regiment of horse formerly commanded by John Lambert and was commissioner for militia in March 1669. He was commissioner for assessment for the East Riding of Yorkshire from January 1660 until his death. When Lambert escaped from the Tower of London in April 1660, Bethell arrested the leaders in York and prevented a rising or any serious trouble. In April 1660 Bethell was elected MP for both Beverley and Hedon and chose to sit for Hedon in the Convention Parliament. He was knighted after 4 September 1660 and became commissioner for sewers in the same month. In 1661 he was re-elected MP for Hedon in the Cavalier Parliament. He was commissioner for corporations for Yorkshire from 1662 to 1663. He was Deputy Lieutenant for East Riding from 1670. In 1675 he was commissioner for recusants for Yorkshire. He was re-elected MP for Hedon at both elections in 1679 but died before the second Exclusion Parliament met.

Bethell died at the age of 64 and was buried at Rise.

Bethell married Mary Mitchellbourne, daughter of Thomas Mitchellbourne of Carleton, on 14 January 1641. He had a son and daughter. His son and grandson both predeceased him, and his estates went to his nephew, Hugh, who was also MP for Hedon.

Parliament of England
New constituency	Member of Parliament for East Riding of Yorkshire; 1654–1656; With: Sir William Strickland 1654; Richard Robinson 1654; Walter Strickland 1654; Richard Darley 1656; Henry Darley 1656	Constituency abolished
