= Rowland Macdonald Stephenson =

19th-century British railway engineer

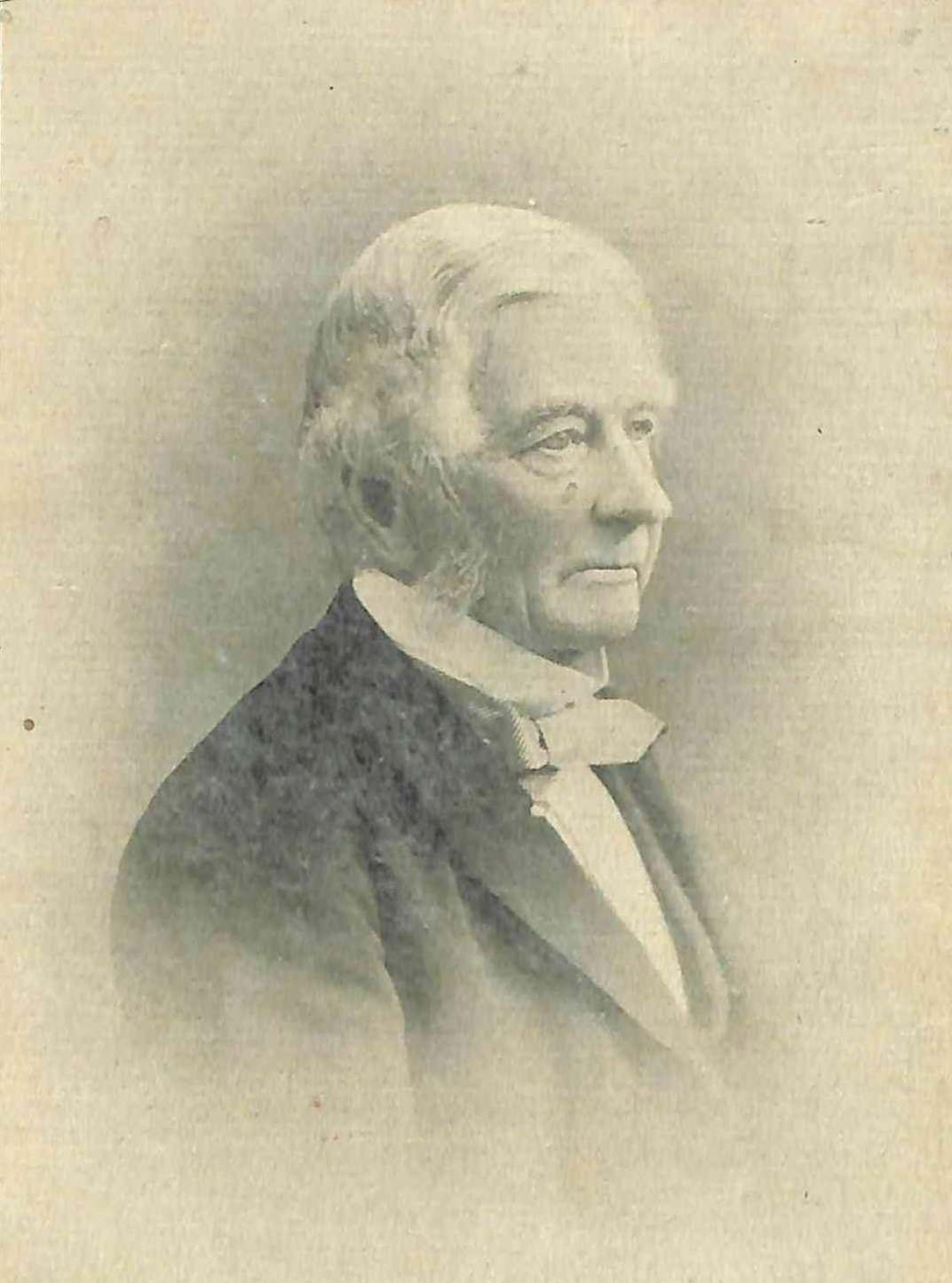
- Born: 9 June 1808; Bloomsbury, London
- Died: 20 November 1895 (aged 87); Holmfield
- Education: Harrow
- Occupation: Civil engineer
- Known for: Promoter of the East Indian Railway, author
- Title: Knighted (1856), director and deputy chairman of the East Indian Railway Company, chairman of the Pondicherry Railway Company
- Spouse(s): Marianne Hederstedt (1840); Elizabeth Tindall (1883)
- Children: Had 12 children: Marianne Catherine Stephenson, Rowland MacDonald Stephenson, Frank Stephenson, Henry Goodwyn Stephenson, Caroline Louisa Stephenson, Harriet Agnes Latham
- Parent(s): Rowland Stephenson and Mary Eliza Stephenson
- Relatives: Brother of Cecil Mackintosh Stephenson

Sir Rowland Macdonald Stephenson (9 January 1808 – 1895) was a 19th-century British railway engineer instrumental in the establishment of the East India Railway in British India.

== Early life ==
Born in Bloomsbury on 9 January 1808, into a long-established Cumberland family, Rowland Macdonald Stephenson was the oldest son of banker and politician Rowland Stephenson and his wife, Mary Eliza. Educated at Harrow, he began work in his father's bank but its failure in 1828 (and his father's consequent exile in America) caused him to move into engineering, at first as London agent for the Gospel Oak Ironworks in Staffordshire. He applied himself to the study of railway engineering and became and associate of the Institution of Civil Engineers in 1836. In 1838 he became secretary of "The Comprehensive Company for establishing Regular Steam Communication with India", which became the "Peninsular and Oriental Steam Navigation Company" in 1840. In 1840, Sir Rowland married Marianne, the daughter of Lieutenant Edward Hederstedt, R.N., and together, they had twelve children. After Marianne's death in 1882, Sir Rowland, at the age of 75, married Elizabeth Tindall, the widow of J. Tindall of Scarborough.

=== Children ===
Name	Date of birth	Date of death	Brief biography	Marriage and children
Marianne Catherine Stephenson	1845	DNK	Born in Greater London, Marianne was the oldest child.	
Rowland MacDonald Stephenson	1847	DNK	Born in Greater London, Rowland was the oldest son.	
Frank Stephenson	1848	DNK	Born in Kolkata, West Bengal, India.	
Henry Goodwyn Stephenson	31 January 1853	DNK	Born in Kolkata, West Bengal, India.	
Caroline Louisa Stephenson	5 October 1854	DNK	Born in Kolkata, West Bengal, India.	

== Railroad career ==
In 1843 he took his family to India, hoping not only to establish railways there, but all the way back to Europe. Sir Rowland was managing director of the East India Railway Company, and his brother Cecil Mackintosh Stephenson, was an agent who started building a line from Calcutta in 1849, and he was knighted for this in October 1856. He advocated an imperial railway to the Chinese government in 1859 and a Kowloon–Canton Railway to the Hong Kong Chamber of Commerce in 1864; both proposals were rejected.

== Authored works ==
- Stephenson, C.E., R. Macdonald. Report Upon the Practicability and Advantages of the Introduction of Railways into British India. (London: Printed by Kelly & Co., 1845).
- Stephenson, Rowland Macdonald. Railways: An Introductory Sketch with Suggestions, in Reference to Their Extension to British Colonies, Part I. with Illustrations (London: John Weale, Architectural Library, 1850).
- Stephenson, Sir Macdonald. Railways in Turkey (London: John Weale, 1859).
- Stephenson, Sir Macdonald. Railways in China (London: J. R. Adlard, 1864).
- Stephenson, Sir Rowland Macdonald. Rudimentary and Practical Instructions on the Science of Railway Construction for the Use of Beginners and Those Who Have Commercial Practice. (London: Virtue Brothers & CO., 1866).
- Stephenson, C.E., F.R.G.S., Sir R. Macdonald. The Science of Railway Construction, 4th edition. (London: Strahan & CO., Publishers, 1869).

== See also ==
- Kerr, Ian J. Engines of Change: The Railroads that Made India (London: Praeger, 2007), 28, 105.
- The Spectator Archive. "Rowland Stephenson".(25 April 1829), p. 10.
- "The London Gazette" Issue 19225 (30 December 1834), p. 2356.
- "Image" Sir Rowland Macdonald Stephenson (1808-1895), Civil engineer and writer on railways.
- "Sir Rowland Macdonald Stephenson and Calcutta Railways" Calcutta Confusion (11 November 2013).
- "Great Western of Bengal Railway Company, Calcutta, 1845-1847" Purono Kolkata (28 October 2015).
- "The KCR--choice of routes, construction and opening." The Industrial History of Hong Kong (March 10, 2014).
