= 1947 Howdenshire by-election =

UK parliamentary by-election

The 1947 by-election for the constituency of Howdenshire in the United Kingdom House of Commons was held on 27 November 1947, caused by the retirement of the incumbent Conservative MP Clifford Glossop. The result was a hold for the Conservative Party, with their candidate George Odey.

== Result ==
Howdenshire by-election, 1947
Party	Candidate	Votes	%	±%
Conservative	George Odey	23,344	64.0	+8.1
Labour Co-op	Tom Neville	9,298	25.5	−3.7
Liberal	JE Wilson	3,819	10.5	−4.4
Majority		14,046	38.5	+11.8
Turnout		36,461		
Conservative hold		Swing		

== Previous election ==
General election 1945: Howdenshire
Party	Candidate	Votes	%	±%
Conservative	Clifford Glossop	21,348	55.9	−8.0
Labour Co-op	Tom Neville	11,161	29.2	+20.6
Liberal	JE Wilson	5,669	14.9	−12.6
Majority		10,187	26.7	−9.7
Turnout		38,178	71.3	+2.1
Conservative hold		Swing		
