= Stanley Jackson (cricketer) =

English cricketer and politician (1870–1947)

The Right Honourable Sir Stanley Jackson GCSI GCIE KStJ
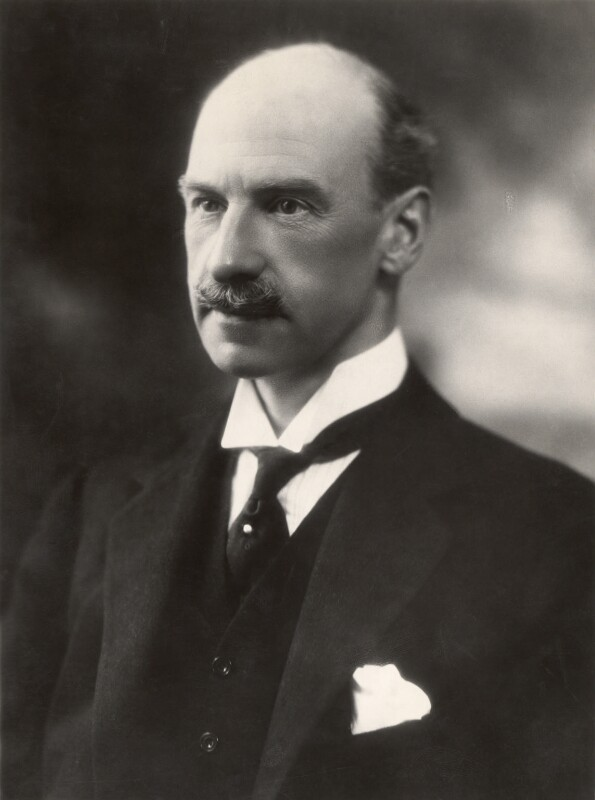
- Jackson in 1923

Financial Secretary to the War Office
- In office 1922–1923
- Preceded by: George Frederick Stanley
- Succeeded by: Rupert Gwynne

Chairman of the Conservative Party
- In office 1923–1926
- Preceded by: George Younger
- Succeeded by: John Davidson

Governor of Bengal
- In office 1927–1932
- Preceded by: The Earl of Lytton
- Succeeded by: Sir John Anderson

Member of Parliament for Howdenshire
- In office 1915–1926
- Preceded by: Henry Harrison-Broadley
- Succeeded by: William Henton Carver
- Cricket career

Personal information
- Full name: Francis Stanley Jackson
- Born: 21 November 1870; Chapel Allerton, Leeds, Yorkshire, England
- Died: 9 March 1947 (aged 76); Hyde Park, London, England
- Nickname: Jacker
- Batting: Right-handed
- Bowling: Right arm fast-medium

International information
- National side: England
- Test debut (cap 82): 17 July 1893 v Australia
- Last Test: 16 August 1905 v Australia

Domestic team information
- Years: Team
- 1890–1907: Yorkshire
- 1890–1893: Cambridge University

Career statistics
Competition	Tests	First-class
Matches	20	309
Runs scored	1,415	15,901
Batting average	48.79	33.83
100s/50s	5/6	31/76
Top score	144*	160
Balls bowled	1,587	37,516
Wickets	24	774
Bowling average	33.29	20.37
5 wickets in innings	1	42
10 wickets in match	0	6
Best bowling	5/52	8/54
Catches/stumpings	10/–	195/–
- Source: Cricinfo, 11 November 2008

Sir Francis Stanley Jackson GCSI GCIE KStJ (21 November 1870 – 9 March 1947), known as the Honourable Stanley Jackson during his playing career, was an English cricketer, soldier and Conservative Party politician. He played in 20 Test matches for the England cricket team between 1893 and 1905.

== Early life ==
Jackson was born in Leeds. His father was William Jackson, 1st Baron Allerton. He was educated at Lockers Park School in Hertfordshire and Harrow School. During Stanley's time at Harrow his fag was fellow parliamentarian and future Prime Minister Winston Churchill. He went up to Trinity College, Cambridge, in 1889.

== Cricket career ==
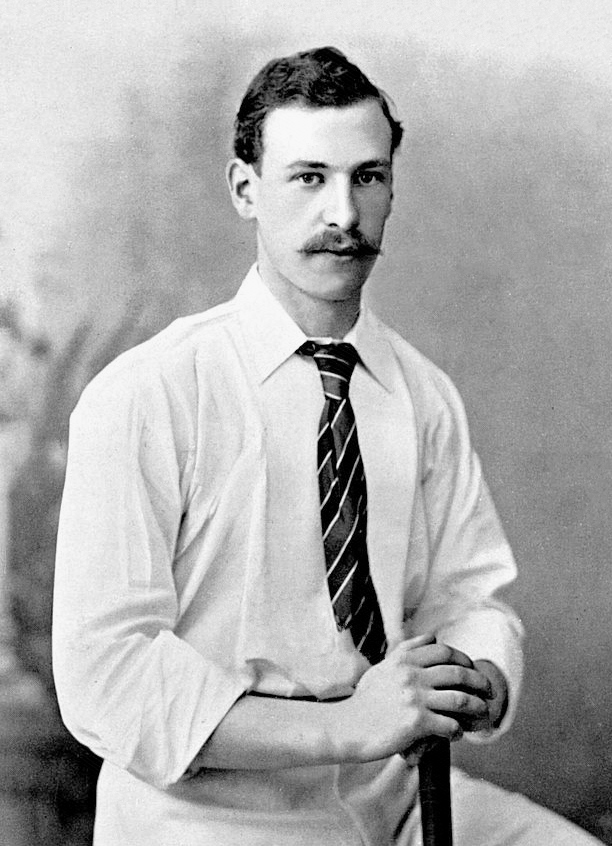
Jackson c. 1895

Jackson played for Cambridge University, Yorkshire and England. He spotted the talent of Ranjitsinhji when the latter, owing to his unorthodox batting and his race, was struggling to find a place for himself in the university side, and as captain was responsible for Ranji's inclusion in the Cambridge First XI and the awarding of his blue. According to Alan Gibson this was "a much more controversial thing to do than would seem possible to us now". He was named a Wisden Cricketer of the Year in 1894.

He captained England in five Test matches in 1905, winning two and drawing three to retain The Ashes. Captaining England for the first time, he won all five tosses and topped the batting and bowling averages for both sides, with 492 runs at 70.28 and 13 wickets at 15.46. These were the last of his 20 Test matches, all played at home as he could not spare the time to tour. Jackson still holds the Test record for the most matches in a career without playing away from home.

An orthodox batsman with a penchant for forcing strokes in front of square on both sides of the wicket he was regarded as a very sound player of fast bowling. His own bowling was a brisk fast medium, with a good off cutter his main weapon. While his commitments outside cricket limited the number of games he played he was a key member of the very strong Yorkshire sides who won six county championships during his career (although this did include 1901 when Jackson did not appear in the county championship). His performances in 1896 and 1898 in particular showed what his statistics could have been if he had been able to dedicate more time, scoring over 1,000 championship runs at better than 40.00 in each season and taking over 100 wickets across the two seasons at an average of under 20.

He was also the first batsman to be dismissed in the so-called "nervous nineties" on Test debut.

Gibson wrote of him as a cricketer that he had "a toughness of character, a certain ruthlessness behind the genial exterior ... He does not seem to have been a particularly popular man, though he was always a deeply respected one."

He was president of the Marylebone Cricket Club (MCC) in 1921.

Jackson succeeded Lord Hawke as president of Yorkshire County Cricket Club in 1938 after Hawke's death and held the post until his own death in 1947.

== Military and political career ==
As a former lieutenant in the Harrow School Volunteers, on 16 January 1900 Jackson was gazetted to a captaincy direct rather than being promoted in the normal way. He was appointed captain in 3rd (1st Royal Lancashire Militia) Battalion, King's Own Royal Regiment (Lancaster). He left with his battalion in February 1900 to serve in the Second Boer War, and arrived in South Africa the following month. He transferred to the West Yorkshire Regiment as a lieutenant-colonel in 1914.

He was elected as a Member of Parliament at a by-election in February 1915, representing Howdenshire (Yorkshire) until resigning his seat on 3 November 1926. He served as Financial Secretary to the War Office 1922–23. In 1927 he was appointed Governor of Bengal and in that year was knighted with the GCIE and was made a member of the Privy Council. In 1928 while he was Governor of Bengal, he inaugurated The Malda District Central Co-operative Bank Ltd in Malda District of Bengal to promote co-operative movements. He was awarded the KStJ in 1932.

On 6 February 1932, Jackson sidestepped and ducked five pistol shots fired at close range by a girl student named Bina Das in the Convocation Hall of the University of Calcutta. Escaping unharmed and smiling, "[e]ven before the smoke had blown away, the Governor resumed his speech amid cheers." The attacker was tackled and disarmed by Lieutenant-Colonel Hassan Suhrawardy (the first Muslim vice chancellor of the University of Calcutta), who was knighted by the King for his heroism. Later that year, Jackson was appointed GCSI.

== Family ==
Jackson married Julia Harrison-Broadley, daughter of Henry Harrison-Broadley, of Welton House, Brough, Yorkshire, at St. Helen's Church, Welton, East Yorkshire, on 5 November 1902.

They had one son, Major Henry Jackson (1903–1962), who married Grace Beddard, his cousin (a granddaughter of Lord Allerton).

== Funeral ==
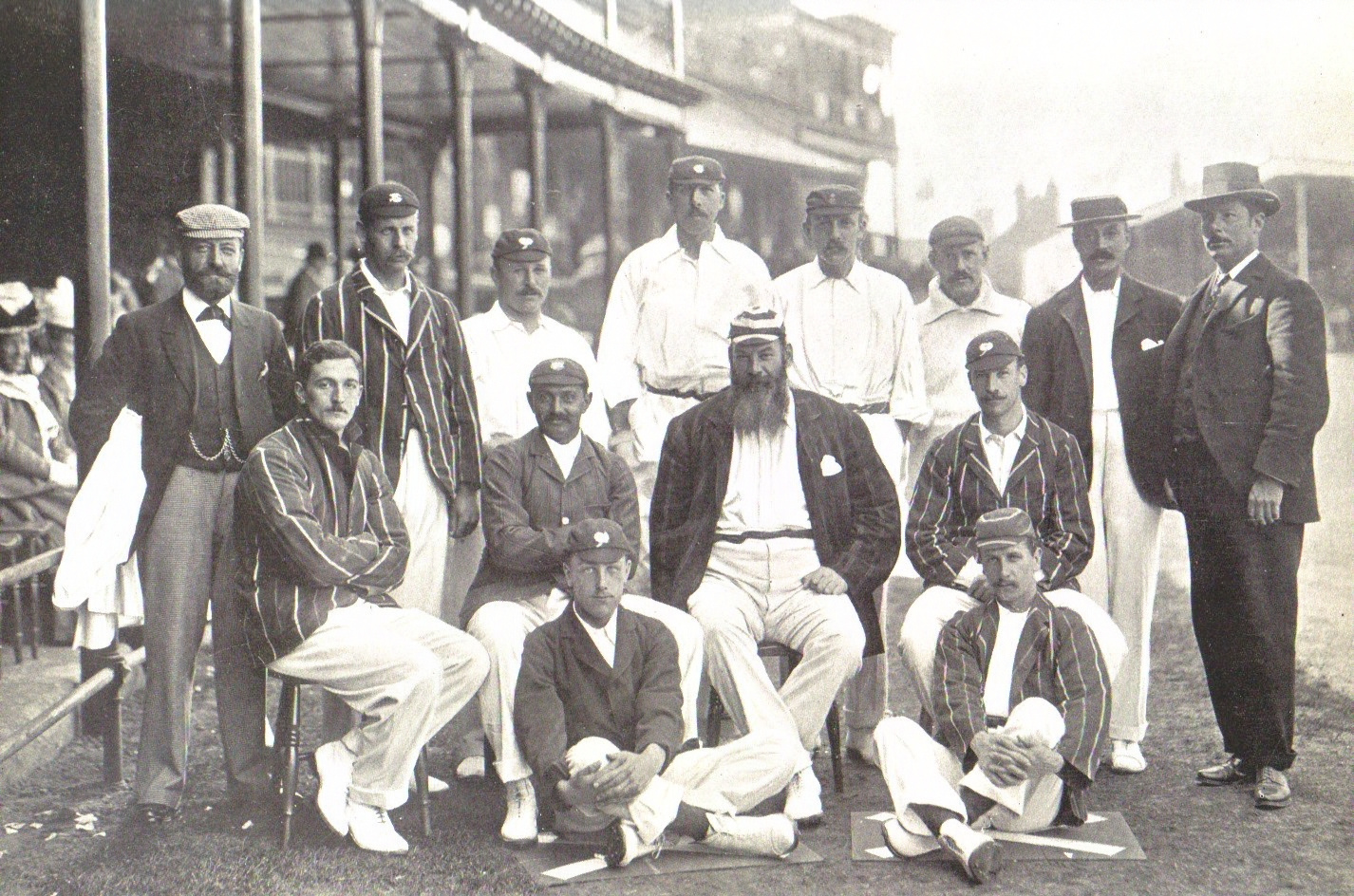
England team v. Australia, Trent Bridge 1899. Back row: Dick Barlow (umpire), Tom Hayward, George Hirst, Billy Gunn, J. T. Hearne (12th man), Bill Storer (wkt kpr), Bill Brockwell, V. A. Titchmarsh (umpire). Middle row: C. B. Fry, K. S. Ranjitsinhji, W. G. Grace (captain), Stanley Jackson. Front row: Wilfred Rhodes, Johnny Tyldesley. Jackson, Hirst and Rhodes are wearing their Yorkshire caps.

Jackson died in London of complications following a road accident. Recalling his funeral, the Bishop of Knaresborough remarked "As I gazed down on the rapt faces of that vast congregation, I could see how they revered him as though he were the Almighty, though, of course, infinitely stronger on the leg side."

== See also ==
- History of Test cricket (1890 to 1900)

== Bibliography ==
- Hodgson, Derek (1989). The Official History of Yorkshire County Cricket Club. Ramsbury, Marlborough, Wiltshire: The Crowood Press. ISBN 1-85223-274-9.
- Kilburn, J.M. (1970). A History of Yorkshire Cricket. Stanley Paul. ISBN 0-09-101110-8.
- Woodhouse, Anthony (1989). The History of Yorkshire County Cricket Club. London: Christopher Helm. ISBN 0-7470-3408-7.

Parliament of the United Kingdom
Preceded by Henry Harrison-Broadley	Member of Parliament for Howdenshire; 1915–1926	Succeeded by William Henton Carver
Political offices
Preceded by George Frederick Stanley	Financial Secretary to the War Office; 1922–1923	Succeeded by Rupert Gwynne
Preceded by George Younger	Chairman of the Conservative Party; 1923–1926	Succeeded by John Davidson
Preceded by The Earl of Lytton	Governor of Bengal; 1927–1932	Succeeded by Sir John Anderson
Sporting positions
Preceded by Pelham Warner	English national cricket captain 1905	Succeeded by Pelham Warner
