= East Indian Railway Company =

Railway company in British India

East Indian Railway
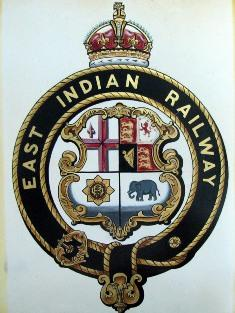

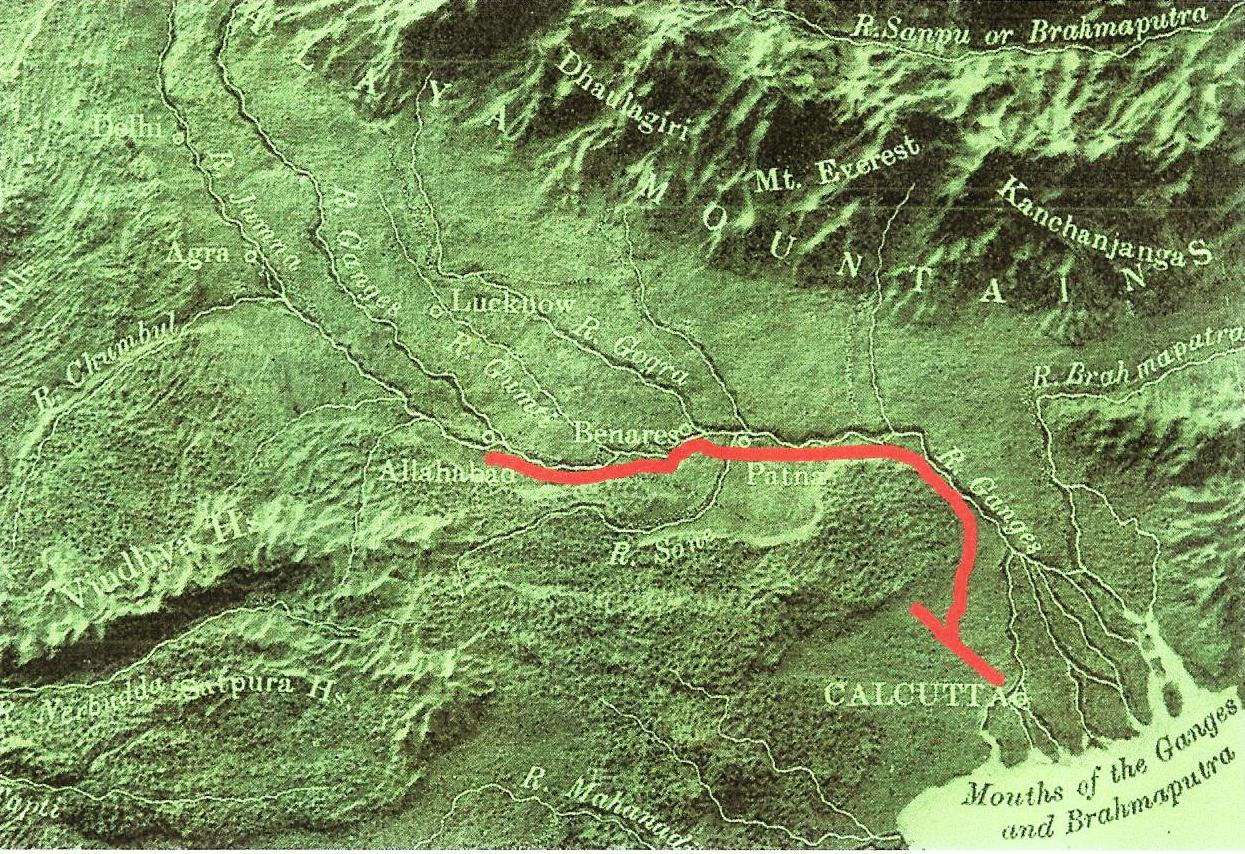
- Map of the East Indian Railway, 1863.
- Industry: Railways
- Founded: 1 June 1845
- Defunct: 14 April 1952
- Headquarters: Calcutta, India
- Area served: West Bengal, Bihar and Uttar Pradesh
- Services: Rail transport

The East Indian Railway Company, operating as the East Indian Railway (reporting mark EIR), introduced railways to East India and North India, while the Companies such as the Great Indian Peninsula Railway, South Indian Railway, Bombay, Baroda and Central India Railway and the North-Western Railway operated in other parts of India. The company was established on 1 June 1845 in London by a deed of settlement with a capital of £4,000,000, largely raised in London.

== 1845–1849 ==
The first board of directors formed in 1845 comprised thirteen members and Rowland Macdonald Stephenson became the first managing director of the company.

Rowland Macdonald Stephenson (later Sir Rowland, but familiarly known as Macdonald Stephenson) and three assistants travelled from England in 1845 and "with diligence and discretion" surveyed, statistically studied and costed the potential traffic for a railway route from Calcutta (the then commercial capital of India) to Delhi via Mirzapur. They assessed that the maximum cost of a twin-track line would not exceed £15000 per mile if the land was available without charge. The East Indian Railway Company was then formed and raised money in London. A contract was signed between the East India Company and the East Indian Railway Company on 17 August 1849, entitling the latter to construct and operate an "experimental" line between Calcutta and Rajmahal, 161 km (100 miles) long at an estimated cost of £1 million which would be later extended to Delhi via Mirzapur.

== 1850–1851 ==
On 7 May 1850, the East Indian Railway Company's managing director Macdonald Stephenson, George Turnbull, the company's Chief Engineer, and the engineer Slater made an initial survey from Howrah (across the River Hooghly from Calcutta) to Burdwan on the route to the Raniganj coalfields. By June, there was an impasse, in that the government did not allow Turnbull and his engineers to mark a route on the ground. Specifications for works were however advertised on 1 July and tenders received on 31 July for six contracts. Bamboo towers 80 feet (24 m) tall were then built above the palm trees at Serampore and Balli Khal to set out the line.

== 1851–1853 ==
On 29 January 1851 the East Indian Railway Company took possession of its first land. Turnbull and other British engineers began detailed surveys of the line. They chose the critical crossing point on the 5,000-foot-wide (1,500 m) Son River (the largest Ganges tributary) on 17 February. The best route to Raniganj was determined in May and June. The plans for Howrah station were submitted on 16 June.

Tenders for 11 contracts arrived on 31 October 1851. In December Turnbull continued his survey: he took levels and defined the line from Burdwan to Rajmahal.

== Divisions ==
Divisions of East Indian Railway (1947–1952): Howrah, Asansol, Danapur, Allahabad, Moradabad and Sealdah (part of the Eastern Bengal Railway until 1942 and later the Bengal and Assam Railway until 1947, but added to the East Indian Railway during the Partition of India in 1947)

== Infrastructure ==
All permanent way and rolling stock was transported from Britain in sailing ships to Calcutta via the Cape of Good Hope (the Suez Canal did not then exist). In April 1854, it was estimated that over 100,000 tons of rails, 27,000 tons of chairs, and some 8000 tons of keys, fish-plates, pins, nuts and bolts were needed.

=== Rolling stock ===
By 1859, there were 77 engines, 228 coaches and 848 freight wagons. By the end of 1877 the company owned 507 steam locomotives, 982 coaches and 6,701 goods wagons. In 1900 the wagon stock was under 14,000 wagons, in 1905 it was over 17,000 wagons.

In 1907 five steam railcar from Nasmyth, Wilson and Company was purchased.

=== Sleepers ===
Although immense quantities of sal tree wood for sleepers were delivered from Nepal, yet more were needed. So fir sleepers from the Baltic were creosoted in England and shipped to India.

=== Bridges ===
The initial plans were for the many bridges over the Ganges tributaries to be built of bricks: hundreds of millions were needed. Brick-making skills were very limited and often the available clay was found to be unsuitable. Transport by river of suitable clay was difficult. Brick availability became a major problem, so the decision was made to use vast quantities of ironwork – imported from England as India had no iron works at that time. Much ironwork was stolen during the Indian Rebellion of 1857.

Construction work of Old Yamuna Bridge in Delhi started in 1863 which was popularly known as lohe ka pool(bridge made by iron) and completed in 1866. It is a 12 spanned bridge. The construction cost of the bridge was Rs 16,16,335/- Initially it was made as a single railway track but was upgraded to double track in 1913.

== 1854–1863 ==
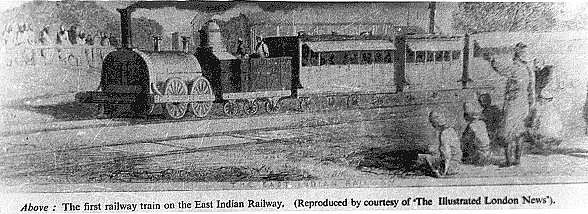
First train of the East Indian Railway, 1854

=== Line openings ===
The 541 miles (871 kilometres) of line from Howrah to Benares were opened to:

- Hooghly (37 km or 23 miles) for passenger traffic on 15 August 1854. More than 3000 applications were received from people wanting to ride in the first train in eastern India. The first train ran to full capacity. The train left Howrah station at 8:30 a.m. and reached Hooghly in 91 minutes. It had three first-class and two second-class coaches. It also had three trucks for third-class passengers and a brakevan for the guard. All of these were built in India, because the ship ferrying the original coaches from England had unfortunately met with natural disaster on the high seas and consequently sank. The locomotive however was imported, though not without its own difficulties. The ship bringing the locomotive had initially, due to an error, sailed to Australia, and the engine had to be shipped back to India.

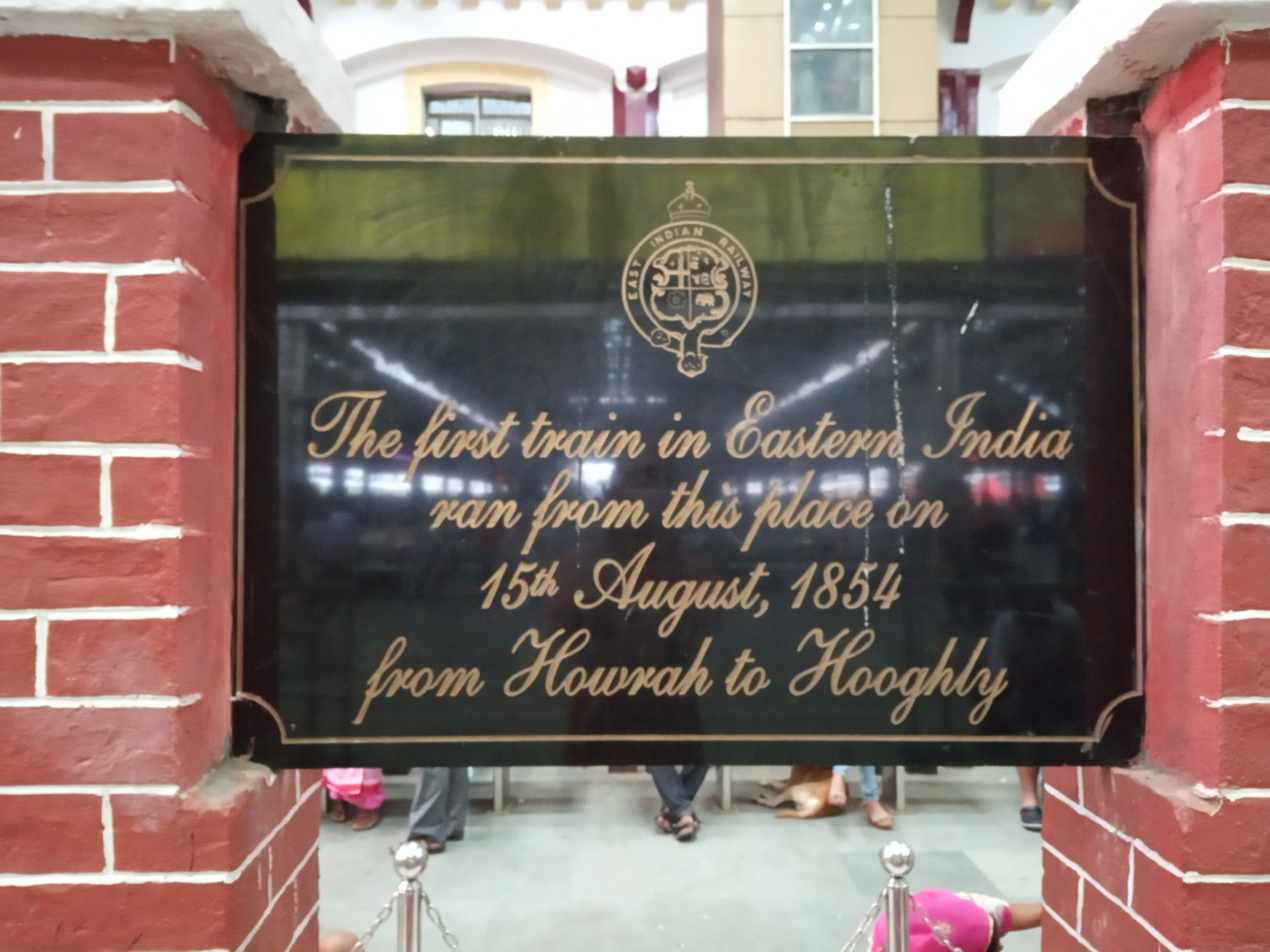
Plaque at Howrah station for first train in Eastern India on 15 August 1854

During the first 16 weeks, the company was delighted to carry 109,634 passengers: 83,118 third class, 21,005 second class, and 5511 first class. The gross earnings, including the receipts of a few tons of merchandise were £6793.

- Pundooah on 1 September 1854.
- Burdwan in February 1855.
- Raniganj with its coalfields on 3 February 1855. In 1855, 617,281 passengers were carried and contracts made to carry 100,000 tons of coal from the Raniganj colliery to Howrah.
- Adjai in October 1858.
- Rajmahal (on the River Ganges) in October 1859. The first train ran from Howrah to Rajmahal via Khana (now known as the Sahibganj Loop) on 4 July 1860. 1,388,714 passengers were carried in 1859.
- Bhagalpur in 1861.
- The loop from Khana Junction to Kiul via Jamalpur, including the Monghyr branch in February 1862. In the same year the line reached Mughal Sarai via the present line beyond Kiul. The sections from Luckee Sarai to Danapore and Danapore to Mughal Sarai were completed in the meantime.
- Son River. George Turnbull inspected the Son bridge and judged it complete on 4 November 1862.
- Across the River Ganges from Benares in December 1862.

Including branch lines this totalled 601 miles (967 kilometres).

=== Bridges, tunnel and cholera ===
The most significant bridge was the girder bridge over the Son River (then known in English as the Soane River) which at the time was understood to be the second longest in the world. Other significant bridges were the girder bridges over the Kiul and Hullohur rivers and the masonry bridge over the Adjai. The Monghyr tunnel was a challenge. In late 1859, a horrific cholera epidemic in the Rajmahal district killed some 4000 labourers and many of the British engineers.

=== Celebrations on completion ===
On 5 February 1863, a special train from Howrah took George Turnbull, the Viceroy Lord Elgin, Lt Governor Sir Cecil Beadon and others over two days to Benares inspecting the line on the way. They stopped the first night at Jamalpur near Monghyr. They alighted at the Son bridge and inspected it. In Benares there was a durbar on 7 February to celebrate the building of the railway and particularly the bridging of the Son river, the largest tributary of the Ganges.

The Chief Engineer responsible for all this construction from 1851 to 1862 was George Turnbull who was acclaimed in the Indian Official Gazette of 7 February 1863 paragraph 5 as the "First railway engineer of India".

=== Criticisms ===
Some historians like Irfan Habib argue that because the contracts signed between East India Company and EIR in 1849 guaranteed 5% return on all capital invested, initially there was no inducement for economy or for employing Indians instead of high-paid Europeans (but initially, there were only experienced British railway civil engineers and no Indian ones). EIR was stated in 1867 to have spent as much as Rs 300,000 on each mile of railway, the construction described by a former Finance Member in India as the most extravagant works ever undertaken.

== Later 19th-century developments ==
East Indian Railway Company Purchase Act 1879 (Note: Section 1.)
- Act of Parliament
- Parliament of the United Kingdom
- Long title: An Act to provide for the vesting of the Undertaking of the East Indian Railway Company in the Secretary of State in Council of India; and for other purposes.
- Citation: 42 & 43 Vict. c. ccvi
- Territorial extent: United Kingdom

Dates
- Royal assent: 11 August 1879
- Commencement: 11 August 1879 (Note: The Acts of Parliament (Commencement) Act 1793.)
- Repealed: 31 January 2013
Other legislation
Amended by	East India Unclaimed Stock Act 1885
Repealed by	Statute Law (Repeals) Act 2013

Status: Repealed

Text of statute as originally enacted

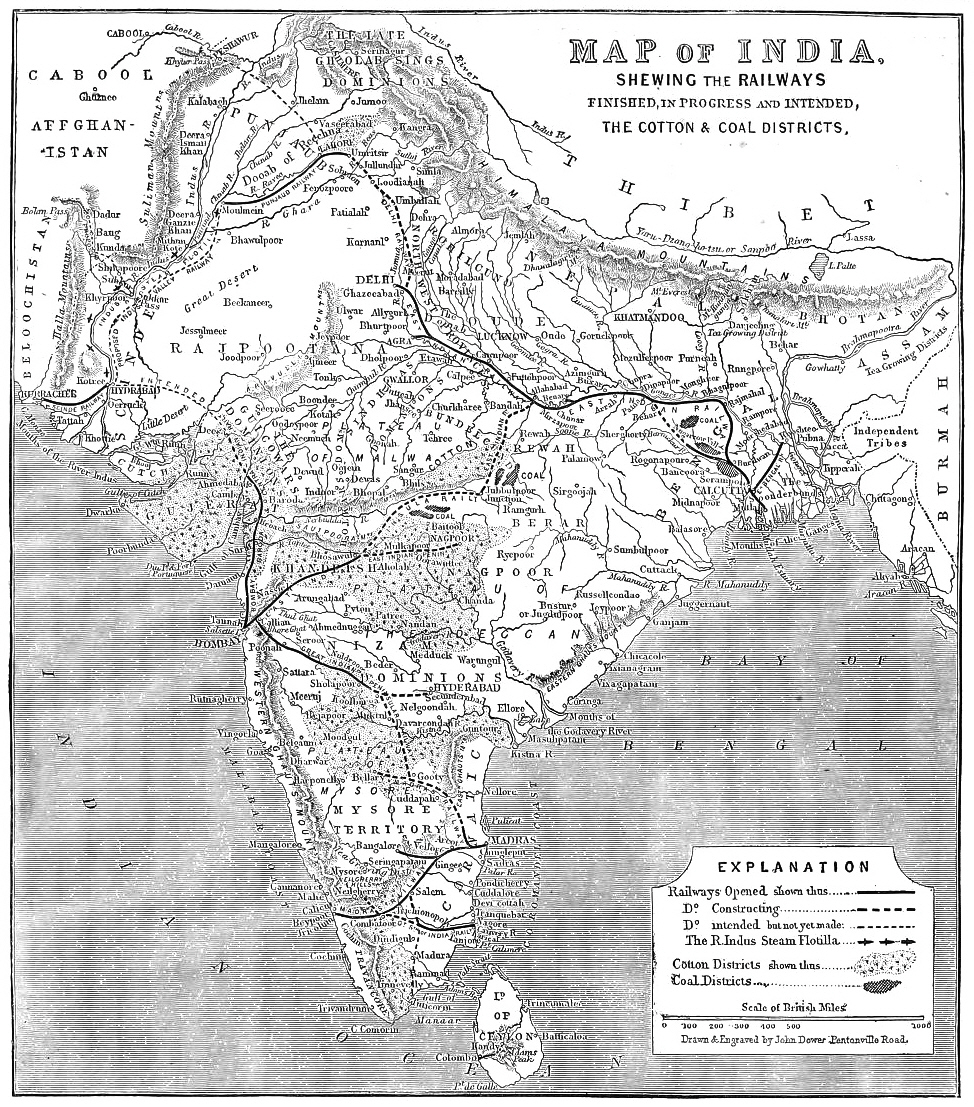
Railway map of India, 1865

The line from Kanpur to Allahabad was opened in 1859. In 1860, the Kanpur-Etawah section was opened to traffic, and between 1862 and 1866 all gaps between Howrah and Delhi were filled, and the connection to Agra built. The bridges over the Yamuna at Allahabad and at Delhi were completed in 1865 and 1866 respectively. In June 1867 the Allahabad-Jabalpur branch was completed and a connection made at Jabalpur with the Great Indian Peninsula Railway, thus completing the rail connections between Calcutta and Delhi and Calcutta and Bombay. On 31 December 1879, the British Indian Government purchased the East Indian Railway Company using the East Indian Railway Company Purchase Act 1879 (42 & 43 Vict. c. ccvi), but leased it back to the company to work under a contract terminable in 1919.

== 20th-century developments ==
On 1 January 1925 the British Indian Government took over the management of the East Indian Railway and divided it into six divisions: Howrah, Asansol, Danapur, Allahabad, Lucknow and Moradabad.

On 14 April 1952, Jawaharlal Nehru, the Prime Minister of India inaugurated two new zones of the first six zones of the Indian Railways. One of them, the Northern Railways had the three "up-stream" divisions of East Indian Railway: Allahabad, Lucknow and Moradabad, while the other, the Eastern Railways had the three "down-stream" divisions: Howrah, Asansol and Danapur and the complete Bengal Nagpur Railway.

== Classification ==
It was labeled as a Class I railway according to Indian Railway Classification System of 1926.

== See also ==
- Rail transport in India § History

== Bibliography ==
- Habib, Irfan (2006). A Peoples History of India Vol 28. Indian Economy 1858–1914. Aligarh: Tulika.
- Huddleston, George (1906). History of the East Indian Railway. Calcutta: Thacker, Spink & Company.
- Mukherjee, Hena (1995). The Early History of the East Indian Railway 1845–1879. Calcutta: Firma KLM. ISBN 81-7102-003-8.
- Rao, M.A. (1988). Indian Railways. New Delhi: National Book Trust.
