= War tax due stamp =

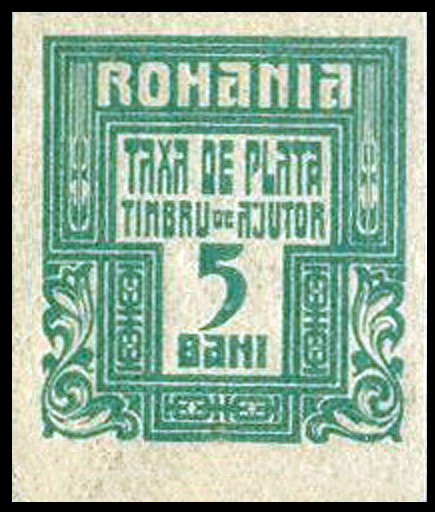
War tax due stamp, Romania, 1918. Inscription: Romanian: "Taxa de plată. Timbru de ajutor" ("Fee of payment. Stamp of help")

War tax due stamp is a kind of war tax and postage due stamps that was used for mail when the war tax has not been paid by the sender. They were issued in Romania between 1915 and 1921.

During war the sender of a letter paid a war tax. Then they placed a war tax stamp on the letter showing the tax was paid. If the sender did not do that, a war tax due stamp was applied by the postal service. When the letter was delivered the person receiving the letter paid double the normal rate.

== See also ==
- Postage due
- Postage stamps and postal history of Romania
- War tax stamp
