= Henry Harrison-Broadley =

Henry Broadley Harrison-Broadley (12 March 1853 – 29 December 1914) was a British Conservative Party politician who sat in the House of Commons from 1906 to 1914.

Harrison-Broadley was the nephew of William Harrison-Broadley, former MP for East Riding of Yorkshire. On the death of his uncle in 1896 he inherited Welton House. On 25 October 1899 he was appointed Honorary Colonel of the 1st Volunteer Battalion, East Yorkshire Regiment, based in Hull.

Harrison-Broadley was elected as Member of Parliament (MP) for the Howdenshire constituency at the 1906 general election, and held the seat until his death in 1914, aged 61.

Parliament of the United Kingdom
| Preceded by Sir William Wilson-Todd | Member of Parliament for Howdenshire; 1906–1914 | Succeeded by Stanley Jackson |
