= Richard Bethell (1772–1864) =

British politician (1772–1864)

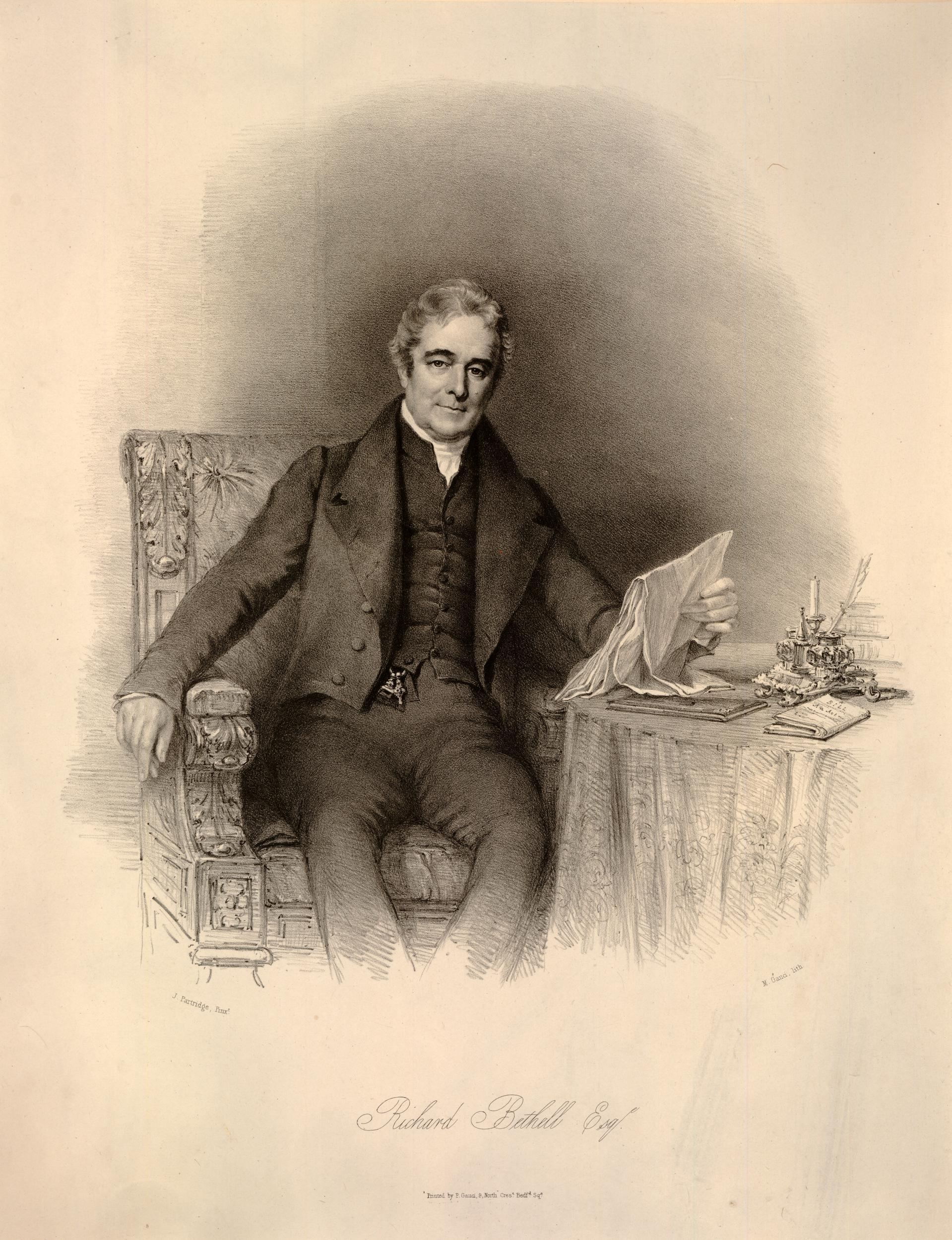
Richard Bethell, lithograph c.1830

Richard Bethell (10 May 1772 – 25 December 1864) was a British Tory and then Conservative Party politician from Rise in the East Riding of Yorkshire. He sat in the House of Commons between 1830 and 1841.

== Life ==
He was the son of the Rev. Richard Bethell, rector of Wallingford, and was born at Isleworth. He was educated at Eton College, and matriculated at King's College, Cambridge in 1791, graduating B.A. in 1795. He was a Fellow of King's from 1794 to 1799.

Bethell was the heir of William Bethell (died 1799) of Watton Abbey in Yorkshire, the younger brother of Hugh Bethell (died 1772), Member of Parliament for Beverley. When William Bethell died, he inherited property at Rise and Watton Abbey. He was High Sheriff of Yorkshire from 1822 to 1823. At the 1830 general election, he was elected as one of the four Members of Parliament (MPs) for Yorkshire. He did not contest the seat in 1831, but when the Yorkshire constituency was divided under the Reform Act 1832, he was elected at the 1832 general election as one of the two MPs for the East Riding of Yorkshire. He was re-elected in 1835 and 1837, and held the seat until he stood down at the 1841 general election.

Parliament of the United Kingdom
Preceded by Richard Fountayne Wilson; Viscount Milton; John Marshall; William Duncombe	Member of Parliament for Yorkshire; 1830–1831; With: Viscount Morpeth 1830–32; William Duncombe 1826 – Dec 1830; Henry Brougham Aug – Dec 1830; Sir John Vanden-Bempde-Johnstone, Bt from Dec 1830	Succeeded by John Charles Ramsden; George Strickland; Viscount Morpeth; Sir John Vanden-Bempde-Johnstone, Bt
New constituency	Member of Parliament for East Riding of Yorkshire; 1832–1841; With: Paul Thompson to 1837; Henry Broadley from 1837	Succeeded by Lord Hotham; Henry Broadley
Honorary titles
Preceded by Sir William Amcotts-Ingilby, Bt	High Sheriff of Yorkshire; 1822–1823	Succeeded by Walter Ramsden Fawkes
