= London Colosseum =

Former building in London, England

Coordinates: 51.526416°N 0.145103°W

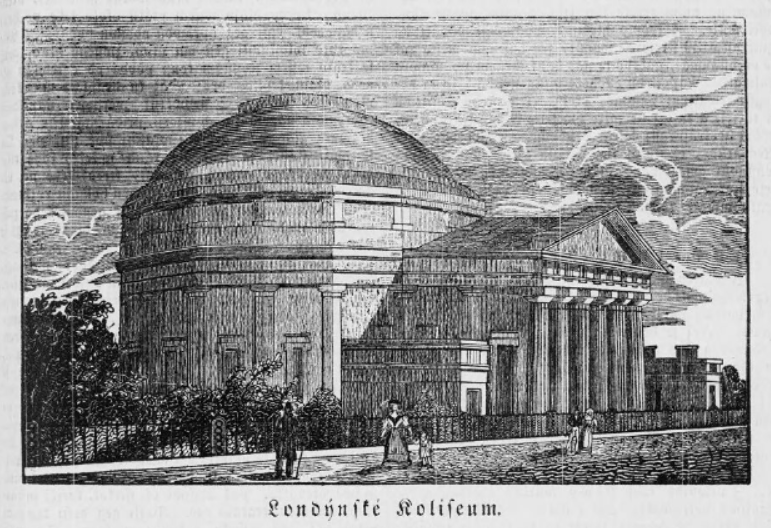
The Colosseum, Regent's park, London (1827–1875)

The London Colosseum was a building to the east of Regent's Park, London. It was built in 1827 to exhibit Thomas Hornor's "Panoramic view of London", the largest painting ever created.

The design of the Colosseum was inspired by the Pantheon in Rome. It was demolished in 1875.

== History ==
The Colosseum was a venture of English artist and surveyor, Thomas Hornor, built to exhibit a vast panoramic view of London. The panorama was based on drawings Hornor had made from the vantage point of a temporary hut placed at the top of the dome of St Paul's Cathedral, while the cross and ball were being replaced in 1821–2. Initial plans to sell panoramic views came to nothing, but an elaborate scheme to create a 360-degree panorama on the inside of a dome of the Colosseum, specially built in Regents Park (and resembling the Roman Pantheon rather than the Roman Colosseum), came to fruition, but at such expense that its principal backer, Rowland Stephenson MP, had to flee to America in 1828, soon followed by Hornor.

The Colosseum was built on the east side of Regent's Park, between Chester Terrace and Cambridge Terrace. Designed by Decimus Burton, with the assistance of John Young it was in the form of a sixteen-sided domed polygon, with a Doric portico. It was built of brick rendered with cement in imitation of stone.

== Creation of the panorama ==
On 12 December 1825, E. T. Parris started work on the panorama, which was based on Hornor's own drawings from the upper part of St. Paul's Cathedral. The project would involve great artistic as well as technical and mechanical challenges for the artist.

By means of squares, Parris began to draw the outlines in chalk, on a scale 16-times larger each way, or, in other words, 256-times the area of the original drawings. This was a work of much labour, and demanding close attention; but it was, nevertheless, completed by the following April. The painting (in oil) was then started. Hornor engaged several artists to assist Parris in the undertaking, but progress was slow and unsatisfactory due to their unfamiliarity with the type of work required. There were also problems of consistency of colour, composition etc., and on several occasions it was necessary to repaint sections. Eventually, Parris decided to take charge and do the whole thing himself with the assistance of several house-painters; this proved to be the right choice.

In addition to the problem of the sheer volume of the canvas, there was also the difficulty of access. This is where Parris's mechanical ingenuity came into its own; he devised all kinds of light scaffoldings, bridges, and platforms. Sometimes he was supported from the floor by two or three long and slender spars, which vibrated with every motion of his arm; sometimes he was suspended by cords from the roof. On two occasions Parris fell from a considerable height; fortunately, in neither case did he suffer any serious injury.

The panorama was completed in November 1829, after a period of 4 years. The painting was the largest ever created, totalling over forty thousand square feet in area, and a testament to Parris's great artistic skill, talent, and perseverance.

== New management ==
Hornor fell into financial difficulties and the property passed into the hands of trustees. It went into decline as a place of public amusement, and in May 1843 it was sold for 23,000 guineas. It was remodelled by William Bradwell, former chief machinist of the Covent Garden Theatre, who added an eastern entrance in Albany Street, and an arched corridor inspired by one at the Vatican.

The new owners announced a "Glypoteca, or Museum of Sculpture", displaying more than 180 works by leading sculptors. Instead of calico draperies "which had the appearance of a tent hastily fitted up for some temporary purpose", the visitor was promised " a lofty dome, of several thousand feet of richly cut glass." The frieze of the Glypoteca was decorated with a copy of the Panathenaic procession from the Parthenon, modelled by Mr Henning, Jr, above which were twenty allegorical fresco paintings by Mr. Absalom. The staircase leading up to the panorama was now disguised by a framework hung with "handsome and classically disposed drapery". Around it were velvet-covered seats raised on a dais, separated by groups of Cupid and Psyche, bearing candelabra in the form of palm trees. The lift, described in the brochure as "the Ascending Room", capable of containing ten or twelve persons, which is raised by secret machinery" was now decorated in the Elizabethan style, and illuminated by stained glass windows.

E.T. Parris repainted "The Grand Panorama of London" for the reopening in 1845, adding detail impossible in the limited time before the original opening.

The conservatories were now decorated in the "arabesque" style, with, in their centre, the "Gothic Aviary". Meanwhile, an "Exterior Promenade" provided pastiches of classical ruins; "A secondary object has been to shew how much effect may be produced in a most limited space, and with apparently the most limited materials" the brochure told visitors.

Another attraction was the "Chalet or Swiss Cottage" from the window of which the visitor could look at real waterfalls, against the background of the Mer de Glace and Mont Blanc, as painted by Mr Danson. There was also a "Stalactite Cavern", constructed by Bradwell and Telbin, based on one at Adelsberg in Germany.

In the evenings, another panorama of London, from the same point of view of was placed in front of E.T. Parris's version. Painted by Danson and Telbin, light effects projected by William Bradwell were intended to provide a realistic vision of the city at night. A nocturnal panorama of Paris was shown from 1848, and a panorama of the lake of Thun, in Switzerland in 1850. A lavishly decorated theatre was added in 1848, which showed a ten scene cyclorama of the 1755 Lisbon earthquake.

== Decline and demolition ==
In 1855, the Colosseum, with the Cyclorama was put up for auction. The highest bid, for a building on which around £200,000 had been spent, was £20,000. According to a history published in 1878,

"the building afterwards passed into several hands, and ultimately it was purchased by a small number of gentlemen, with the idea of erecting there a grand hotel; but this idea was abandoned. Subsequently the lease was purchased by a Mr. Bird, and the walls were levelled to the ground, as stated above, with the view of erecting on its site a number of private residences."

After demolition of the buildings in 1875, the area was vacant until the Cambridge Gate was built in 1876 to 1880.

== See also ==
- George Chambers (1803–1840), a marine painter, was one of the artists who worked on the panorama.
