= William Wilson-Todd =

British politician

Wilson-Todd in 1895.

Sir William Henry Wilson-Todd, 1st Baronet (17 April 1828 – 10 April 1910) was a British Conservative Party politician. He was elected as member of parliament (MP) for the Howdenshire constituency at the 1892 general election, and held the seat until he stepped down from Parliament at the 1906 general election.

He was made a baronet on 31 August 1903, of Halnaby Hall, Yorkshire.

He was succeeded in his baronetcy by his son William Pierrepont Wilson-Todd (1857–1925). His daughter Evelyn Wilson-Todd married at Christ Church, Mayfair, on 4 February 1903 fellow Conservative politician Arthur Henry Aylmer Morton (1835–1913).

Parliament of the United Kingdom
Preceded by Arthur Duncombe	Member of Parliament for Howdenshire; 1892–1906	Succeeded by Henry Harrison-Broadley
Baronetage of the United Kingdom
New creation	Baronet (of Halnaby Hall); 1903–1910	Succeeded by William Pierrepont Wilson-Todd
