= Wilson-Todd collection =

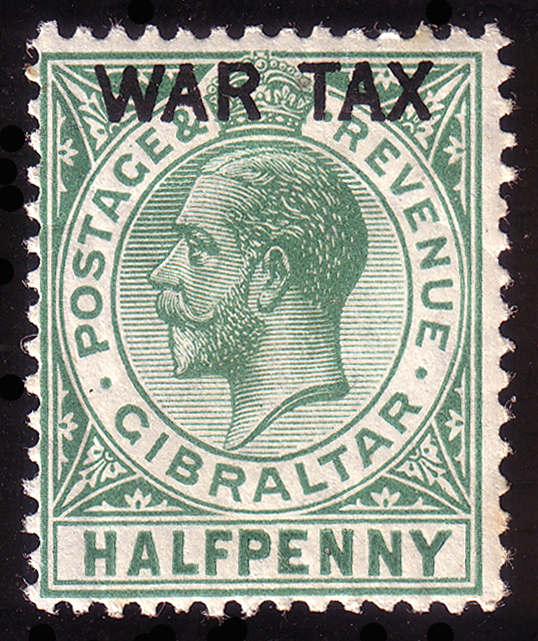
A War Tax Stamp of Gibraltar (not from the Wilson-Todd collection)

The Wilson-Todd collection is a collection of postage stamps issued during, or associated with, the First World War, including many war tax stamps, that forms part of the British Library Philatelic Collections. It was created by James Wilson-Todd and donated to the British Museum by his mother Lady Wilson-Todd after his death. As of April 2008 it was held in one box.

== See also ==
- Imperial War Museum stamp collection
- Revenue Society
- Wilson-Todd baronets
