= Rowland Stephenson (banker) =

British banker and politician

- Born: 19 May 1782; At sea returning to London
- Died: July 1856 (aged 74); Bensalem township, Pennsylvania
- Education: Eton
- Occupation: Banker
- Employer(s): Stephenson, Remington and Company
- Known for: Banking Scandal
- Spouse: Mary Eliza Stephenson
- Children: Rowland Macdonald Stephenson, Cecil Mackintosh Stephenson
- Relatives: Great-Uncle Rowland Stephenson, Uncle and Father-in-Law Edward Stephenson, Brother-in-Law John Norman MacLeod

Rowland Stephenson (19 May 1782 – 2 July 1856) was a British banker and politician who precipitated the collapse of a bank and took refuge in America.

The son of a banker and a great nephew of his namesake, MP for Carlisle (1787–1790), he had been born at sea when his family returned from Florida when their business failed after the American War of Independence. He joined Remington, Stephenson & Company on leaving Eton. He already had several properties in Essex, the manor of Cockermouth and How Hatch estate in Dagenham, before adding to his property in Romford by buying Marshalls in 1816.

== Family life ==
In 1771, Stephenson's father, John (died 1822), married Mary Broadley, the niece of Royal Naval commander, Thomas Broadley. In 1776, John became a member of the King's Council in Pensacola, Florida—under British control since 1763—where he worked as a merchant and provisioning agent. During the American Revolutionary War, John's business collapsed and opted to return to London and become a banking partner in his uncle Rowland Stephenson's bank. It was during their return to London while still at sea that Mary gave birth to Rowland. Stephenson was baptised 2 August 1782 in Camden Town, Greater London.

Stephenson married his cousin, Mary Eliza, on 23 April 1807. His eldest son, Rowland Macdonald Stephenson (1808–1895), became a civil engineer and managing director of the East India Railway Company, for which he was knighted in October 1856.

== Banking career ==
He was treasurer of St Bartholomew's Hospital from 1824 until 1829, where he had an apartment.

== Parliamentary career ==
After several attempts he was elected MP for the Leominster constituency from February 1827 to February 1830, although only after the candidate who had beaten him in 1826 was disqualified.

== Banking scandal ==
Stephenson had apparently invested heavily in Thomas Hornor's London Colosseum and the bank was rumoured to want to remove him from partnership, when he was reported as having taken hundreds of thousands of pounds of securities and cash from Remington, Stephenson, & Coleman on 27 December 1828. He was then reported as cashing the securities, buying a brace of loaded pistols from a pawnbroker, and disappearing. The case achieved great notoriety: for example, his escape via Clovelly was included in a book of illustrations, and the American writer James Fenimore Cooper wrote of being asked in various places about why Stephenson had been allowed to remain in America after landing in Savannah, Georgia, being taken by bounty hunters to New York, but granted habeas corpus rather being returned England to stand trial.

== See also ==
- Bangay, Paul The Dapper Little Banker: The Life of Rowland Stephenson, (Scotforth Books 2011, ISBN-13: 978-1904244707).
- Kerr, Ian J. Engines of Change: The Railroads that Made India (London: Praeger, 2007), 28, 105.
- The Spectator Archive. "Rowland Stephenson".(25 April 1829), p. 10.
- Obituary of Mrs. Hannah Wilson, aged 103, Housekeeper for 75 years with the Stephenson Families. The Anthenaeum. 1807.

Parliament of the United Kingdom
Preceded by The Lord Hotham; Thomas Bish	Member of Parliament for Leominster; 1827–1830; With: The Lord Hotham	Succeeded by The Lord Hotham; John Ward
