= Holwood House =

Country house in the London Borough of Bromley, England

Coordinates: 51°20′52.56″N 0°2′35.05″E

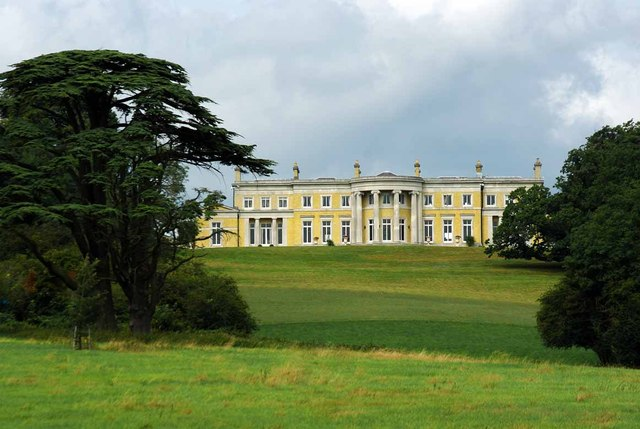
Holwood House in 2012

Holwood House is a 25,060-square-foot (2,328 m^{2}) country house in Keston, near Hayes, in the London Borough of Bromley, England. The house was designed by Decimus Burton, built between 1823 and 1826 and is in the Greek Revival style. It was built for John Ward, who later employed Burton to lay out his Calverley Park Estate in Tunbridge Wells. The gate lodges of that estate take their names from the gate lodges on the Holwood Estate – Farnborough Lodge and Keston Lodge.

Holwood is a grade I listed building, while its grounds, the Holwood Estate, are listed at grade II on the Register of Parks and Gardens of Special Historic Interest in England.

== Home of William Pitt the Younger ==
Holwood House is on the site of an earlier building owned by William Pitt the Younger, and the grounds contain the remains of an Iron Age fort known as a "Caesar's Camp", which is a Scheduled Ancient Monument. Pitt is thought to have caused the Fort remains to be levelled in order to landscape the estate's gardens.

The house was described in Thomas Wilson in his Accurate Description of Bromley in Kent of 1797 as "a small, neat, white building; it is more simple than elegant, and built on a rising ground, which commands one of the most fertile, variegated, and extensive inland prospects in the whole county". Wilson added "A stranger visiting this house, to view the country mansion of the prime minister of Great Britain, would be exceedingly surprised, to find it so insignificant in size and external appearance". Pitt engaged John Soane to enlarge the house and Humphrey Repton to improve the grounds.

== Wilberforce Oak ==
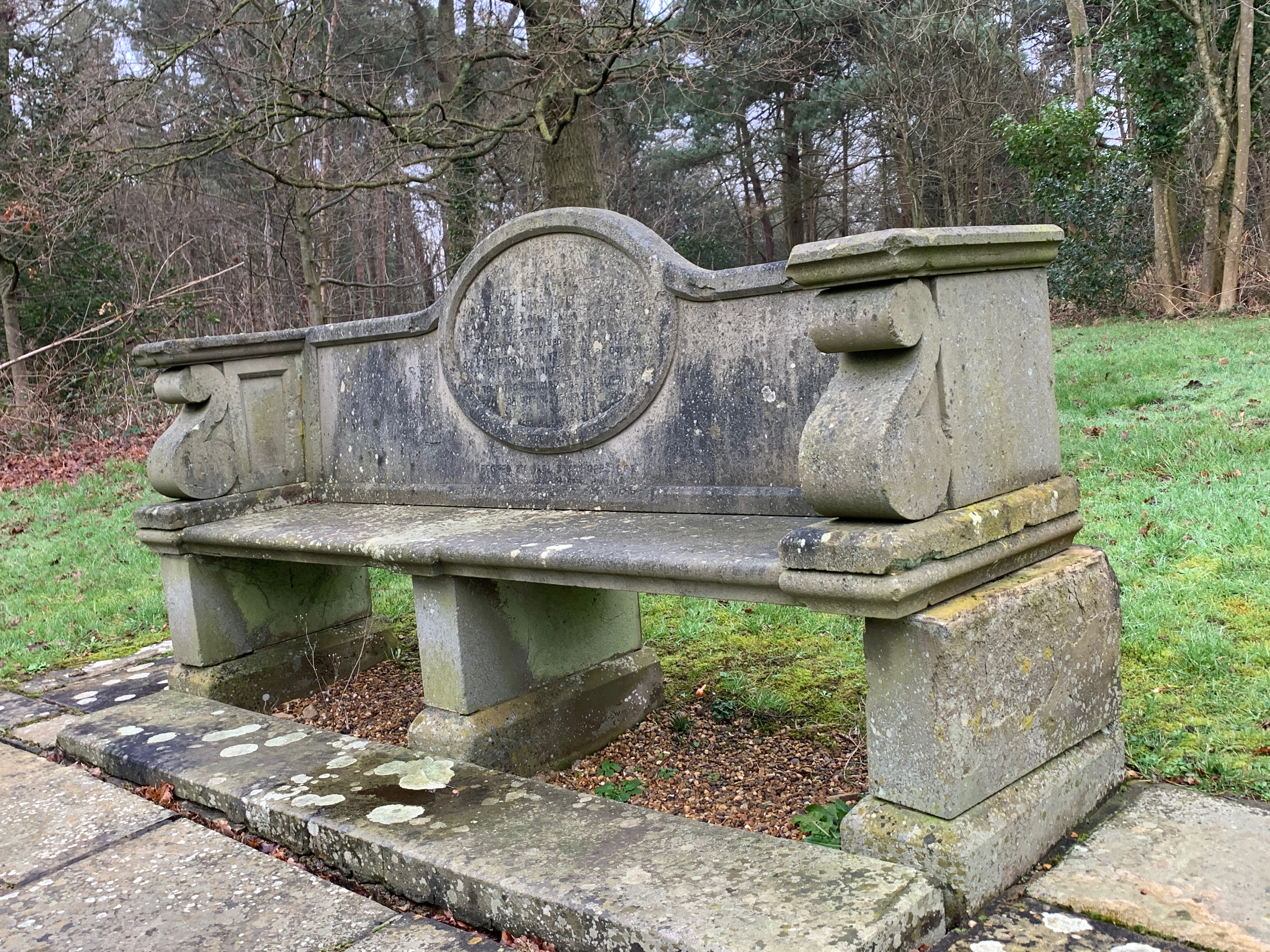
Wilberforce Seat at Holwood House

The grounds are close to the stump of an oak tree known as the Wilberforce Oak, easily distinguished from the surrounding trees by a stone seat constructed in its shade. The Wilberforce Oak is part of the Holwood Estate, a private residential development that borders Holwood House and its grounds.

A diary entry from William Wilberforce in 1788 reads:

At length, I well remember after a conversation with Mr. Pitt in the open air at the root of an old tree at Holwood, just above the steep descent into the vale of Keston, I resolved to give notice on a fit occasion in the House of Commons of my intention to bring forward the abolition of the slave-trade.

An oak sapling was planted in 1969 to replace the ageing original pollard oak (Quercus robur, also known as English oak). The work was carried out by the Forestry Section of Kent County Council's Estates Department in collaboration with the Anti-Slavery Society of Denison University in Ohio.

By 1987 the original oak tree was a hollow shell surrounding a new sapling grown from one of its acorns. This young tree blew down in the Great storm of 1987. Slices of it were sold off by the London Borough of Bromley's Parks Department as a fundraiser to plant trees to replace those lost through the borough. A new sapling, the third generation, taken from an acorn of the younger tree, now stands beside the remains of the original tree.

== Ownership ==
The house is privately owned. The property was marketed for sale in 2025 with a guide price of £23.5 million.
