= John Ward (1779–1855) =

British politician

John Ward (22 December 1779 – 24 February 1855) was a British politician.

Ward had Holwood House built for him between 1823 and 1826 and resided there.

Ward was a Member of Parliament (MP) for Leominster from 11 Feb 1830 to 2 August 1830.

Ward was High Sheriff of Kent in 1835.

He died aged 75.

Parliament of the United Kingdom
Preceded by The Lord Hotham; Rowland Stephenson	Member of Parliament for Leominster; 1830; With: The Lord Hotham	Succeeded by The Lord Hotham; William Marshall
