= Thomas Bish =

British politician

Thomas Bish (5 May 1779 – 27 December 1842) was a British politician.

Bish worked as a stockbroker and held a government contract for the lottery. At the 1826 UK general election, he stood in Leominster as a Whig. He was elected but was unseated on an election petition due to the contract he held.

In 1821 Bish bought the lease to Vauxhall Gardens with Frederick Gye the elder and Richard Hughes, and started work reboot the fading glamour of the public entertainments. He sent pyrotechnist Sarah Hengler to Paris to learn cutting edge techniques from the fireworks artisits at the Jardin de Tivoli, famed for its firework displays. Royal Vauxhall Gardens relaunched on 3 June 1822 and by the following year was attracting 140,000 visitors a season.

The lottery was abolished in 1826, and this enabled Bish to stand again in Leominster at the 1832 UK general election, winning the seat. In Parliament, he opposed the Corn Law and supported a secret ballot and shorter Parliamentary terms. He argued that the Bank of England should manufacture their banknotes in a manner that makes them harder to forge and that Parliament and the Court should sometimes meet in Dublin. He also argued for the revival of the state lottery, arguing that since its abolition, many British citizens instead put money into lotteries based overseas.

Bish held his seat at the 1835 UK general election but stood down in 1837.

Parliament of the United Kingdom
Preceded by William Cuningham-Fairlie; The Lord Hotham	Member of Parliament for Leominster; 1826–1827; With: The Lord Hotham	Succeeded by The Lord Hotham; Rowland Stephenson
Preceded by William Bertram Evans; The Lord Hotham	Member of Parliament for Leominster; 1832–1837; With: The Lord Hotham	Succeeded by The Lord Hotham; Charles Greenaway
