= Charles Greenaway =

British politician

Member of Parliament for Leominster
- In office 25 July 1837 – 26 April 1845 Serving with George Arkwright (1842–1845); James Wigram (1841–1842); Beaumont Hotham (1837–1841)
- Preceded by: Thomas Bish; Beaumont Hotham
- Succeeded by: George Arkwright; Henry Barkly

Personal details
- Died: 25 November 1859
- Party: Whig

Charles Greenaway (died 25 November 1859) was a British Whig politician.

Greenaway was elected a Whig Member of Parliament for Leominster at the 1837 general election, and held the seat until 1845 when he resigned by accepting the office of Steward of the Chiltern Hundreds.

Parliament of the United Kingdom
| Preceded by Thomas Bish; Beaumont Hotham | Member of Parliament for Leominster; 1837–1845; With: George Arkwright (1842–1845); James Wigram (1841–1842); Beaumont Hotham (1837–1841) | Succeeded by George Arkwright; Henry Barkly |
