= War tax stamp =

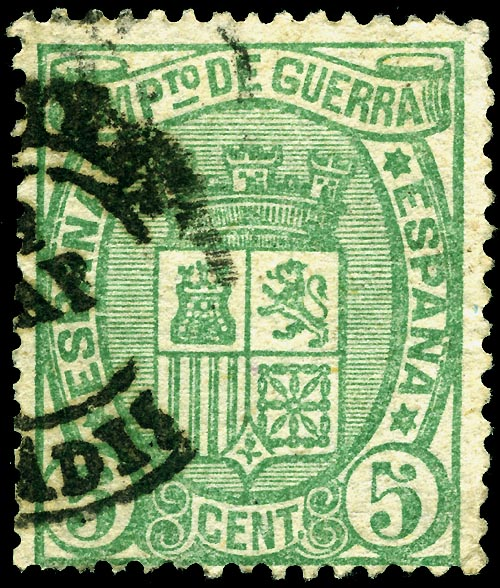
5 centimo war tax stamp of Spain, 1875.

A war tax stamp is a type of postage stamp added to an envelope in addition to regular postage. It is similar to a postal tax stamp, but the revenue is used to defray the costs of a war; as with other postal taxes, its use is obligatory for some period of time.

== Early Spanish issues ==
The first war tax stamps were produced in 1874 in Spain, during the Third Carlist War. A decree of October 2, 1873, imposed a war tax on letters and stamped documents. The stamps were issued on January 1, 1874, in two denominations, 5 centimos and 10 centimos, and depicted the Spanish coat of arms along with the inscription "Impuesto de Guerra" or "Impto de Guerra". The 5 centimo value was intended for use on letters, and the 10 centimo for use on stamped documents. A similar set, using different colors, was issued on January 1, 1875. On June 1, 1876, after the Third Carlist War had ended, a further set of five depicting King Alfonso XII was issued. Intended to help pay off war debts, this set bore denominations of 5, 10 and 25 centimos, 1 peseta and 5 pesetas. On September 1, 1877, additional denominations of 15 and 50 centimos were added to this set. A new issue, also bearing King Alfonso's likeness, was prepared and printed for use in 1879. This issue, a set of seven with denominations of 5, 10, 15, 25 and 50 centimos and 1 and 5 pesetas, was never placed in use as a decree of February 4, 1879 lifted the war tax.

Spain also issued war tax stamps in 1897 and 1898, during the Cuban War of Independence and Spanish–American War. The first set, issued in 1897, contained four stamps bearing the numbers 5, 10, 15 and 20, reflecting their denomination in centimos. The war tax was not initially applied to letters, but apparently was extended to them before the end of 1897. Again, the 5 centimo value was used on letters. Like the earlier issues, they were inscribed "Impto de Guerra"; additionally, they were inscribed "1897–98". For the second set, issued in 1898, the inscription was changed to "1898–99". A single stamp was issued in 1898, a 5 centimo value bearing the likeness of King Alfonso XIII.

== World War I ==
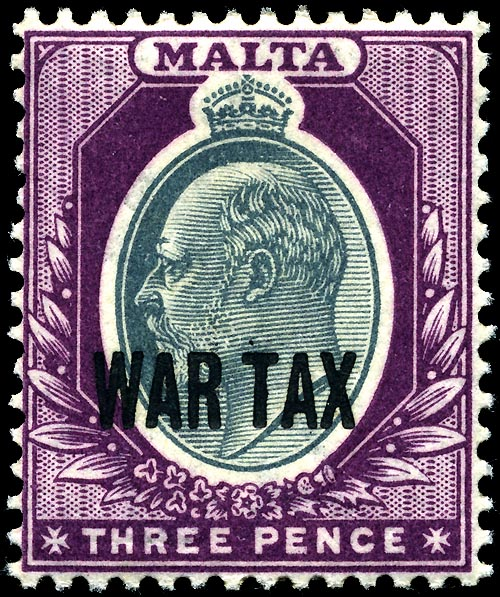
Malta 3-pence war tax overprint, 1918

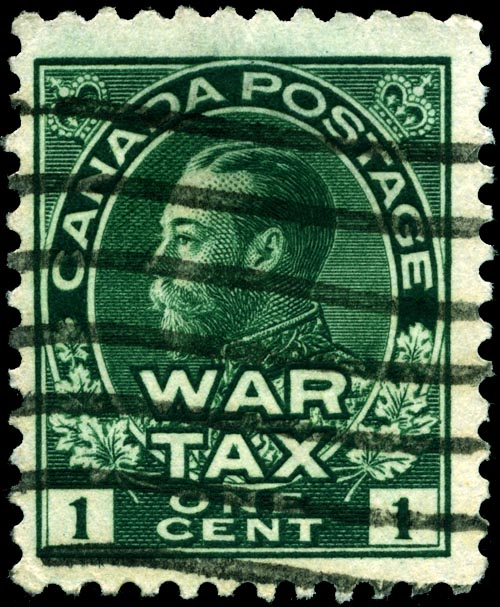
Canada 1c war tax stamp, 1915

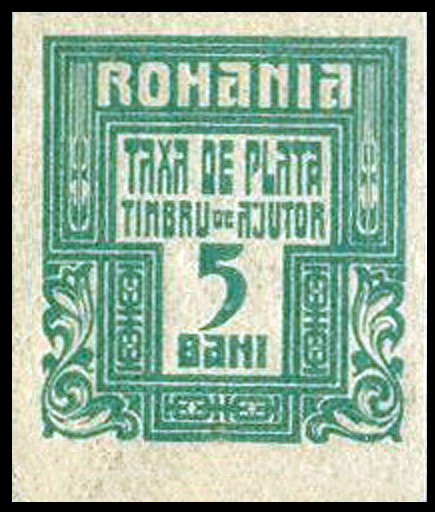
Romanian 5 bani war tax stamp, 1918

The majority of war tax stamps were produced during and immediately after World War I, primarily within the British Empire and its dominions. In most cases, they were produced by overprinting regular issues with "WAR TAX" or "WAR STAMP", though the overprint "WAR" was occasionally used (as in the issues of British Honduras). While they were meant to pay for the war tax only, they were often applied toward postage and registration fees. The following British colonies and dominions produced war tax stamps: Antigua, Bahamas, Barbados, Bermuda, British Guiana, British Honduras, Canada, Cayman Islands, Ceylon, Dominica, Falkland Islands, Fiji, Gibraltar, Gilbert and Ellice Islands, Gold Coast, Grenada, Jamaica, Malta, Montserrat, New Zealand, St. Helena, St. Kitts and Nevis, St. Lucia, St. Vincent, Trinidad and Tobago, Turks and Caicos Islands and Virgin Islands.

Canada was the first country to issue such stamps during this period, following passage of its Special War Revenue Act in February 1915. Its first war tax stamps, produced by modifying the dies of its King George V stamps to read "WAR TAX", were released in March 1915, in denominations of 1 and 2 cents. There are also denominations in 4 and 8 cents. One bank-note from the 1920s is known to have both the 4 and 8 cent, original style, war-tax stamps. The design was modified again in 1916, applying the inscription "1T¢" to 2 cent stamps. This indicated that the stamps carried both their face value and the tax of 1 cent, conceptually similar to a semi-postal stamp, but whose use was required rather than optional. New Zealand followed Canada's example in September 1915, becoming the second country to issue war tax stamps.

Great Britain and Australia imposed war taxes on mail, but did not issue war tax stamps; instead, they used regular stamps to pay the fees. In the United States, which also imposed a war tax following its entry into the war in 1917, the rate for a first-class letter was raised from 2 cents to 3 cents; the added cent was used to pay the tax. A special stamp depicting the allegorical figure of Victory and flags of the Allies was issued to pay this rate.

After Portugal entered World War I in March 1916, several of its colonies issued war tax stamps as well. Most of these were produced by overprinting "TAXA DE GUERRA" on existing stamps, though Mozambique issued a set of two which depicted allegorical figures of History and the Republic. The Portuguese colonies of Macao, Mozambique, Portuguese Africa, Portuguese Guinea, Portuguese India and Timor issued war tax stamps.

== Other war tax issues ==
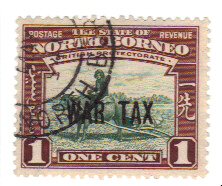
North Borneo war tax overprint, 1941.

Though many countries (e.g., Australia) imposed taxes on mail during World War II, regular stamps were used to pay those taxes. One exception was North Borneo, which issued two war tax stamps in February 1941. These were produced by overprinting "WAR TAX" on the 1 and 2 cent values of a 1939 set of regular stamps.

War tax stamps were issued by Bahrain in 1973 and 1974, with a denomination of 5 fils.

== See also ==
- War tax due stamp
- Wilson-Todd Collection Part of the British Library Philatelic Collections and very strong in war tax stamps.

== References and sources ==
Notes

Sources

- Elias, Peter. "British Empire War Tax (Stamps & Usages/Postal History)". Archived from the original on 2010-04-21.; archived by Internet Archive on 21 April 2010
- Klug, Janet (July 7, 2003). "War tax stamps help finance the war effort". Linn's Stamp News. Amos Press. Archived from the original on June 8, 2011.; archived by Internet Archive on 8 June 2011
- Scott catalogue. Vol. 1 (2001 ed.). Scott Publishing. 2000. ISBN 0-89487-260-5.
- Scott catalogue. Vol. 2 (2001 ed.). Scott Publishing. 2000. ISBN 0-89487-261-3.
- Scott catalogue. Vol. 4 (2001 ed.). Scott Publishing. 2000. ISBN 0-89487-263-X.
- Scott catalogue. Vol. 5 (2001 ed.). Scott Publishing. 2000. ISBN 0-89487-264-8.
- Scott catalogue. Vol. 6 (2001 ed.). Scott Publishing. 2000. ISBN 0-89487-265-6.
- Westoby, W.A.S. (1900). The Adhesive Postage Stamps of Europe, Volume II. L. Upcott Gill.
