= Imperial War Museum stamp collection =

The Imperial War Museum stamp collection is a collection of postage stamps issued during, or associated with, the First World War that is on loan from the Imperial War Museum to the British Library philatelic collections. The collection is rich in material from the former Ottoman Empire. As of October 2007 it consisted of 13 large boxes and a book, Imperial War Museum Stamp Collections by Country, that lists the items held.

== See also ==
- Wilson-Todd collection
