= Arthur Duncombe (1840–1911) =

British Conservative politician

Arthur Duncombe (11 February 1840 – 12 June 1911), was a British Conservative politician.

== Early life ==
Duncombe was the son of Admiral the Hon. Arthur Duncombe, a younger son of Charles Duncombe, 1st Baron Feversham. His mother was Delia, daughter of John Wilmer Field.

== Career ==
He entered the House of Commons for Howdenshire in 1885, a seat he held until 1892.

== Personal life ==
In 1869, Duncombe married Katherine Henrietta Venezia, daughter of Henry John Milbank. Their daughter:

- Muriel Katherine, who married George Nicholas de Yarburgh-Bateson, 4th Baron Deramore, and was the mother of Richard de Yarburgh-Bateson, 6th Baron Deramore.

Duncombe died in June 1911, aged 71. His wife survived him by fifteen years and died in October 1926.

== See also ==
- Baron Feversham

Parliament of the United Kingdom
New constituency	Member of Parliament for Howdenshire; 1885–1892	Succeeded by William Wilson-Todd
