= Howdenshire (constituency) =

Parliamentary constituency in the United Kingdom, 1885–1950

- Former county constituency for the House of Commons
- County: East Riding of Yorkshire

1885–1950
- Created from: East Riding of Yorkshire
- Replaced by: Beverley and Kingston upon Hull Haltemprice

Howdenshire was a county constituency in Yorkshire which returned one Member of Parliament (MP) to the House of Commons of the Parliament of the United Kingdom, elected by the first past the post voting system.

It was created for the 1885 general election, and abolished for the 1950 general election.

== Boundaries ==
1885–1918: The Sessional Divisions of Holme Beacon, Howdenshire, South Hunsley Beacon, Wilton Beacon, and Ouse and Derwent (except the part included in the extended Municipal Borough of York).

1918–1950: The Urban Districts of Hessle and Pocklington, the Rural Districts of Escrick, Howden, Pocklington, and Riccall, in the Rural District of Beverley the civil parishes of Brantingham, Ellerker, Elloughton with Brough, and South Cave, and part of the Rural District of Sculcoates.

== Members of Parliament ==
Election	Member	Party
1885	Arthur Duncombe	Conservative
1892	Sir William Wilson-Todd	Conservative
1906	Henry Harrison-Broadley	Conservative
1915 by-election	Stanley Jackson	Conservative
1926 by-election	William Carver	Conservative
1945	Clifford Glossop	Conservative
1947 by-election	George Odey	Conservative
1950	constituency abolished	

== Election results ==
=== Elections in the 1880s ===
General election 1885: Howdenshire
Party	Candidate	Votes	%
Conservative	Arthur Duncombe	4,525	57.6
Liberal	Anthony George Shiell	3,334	42.4
Majority		1,191	15.2
Turnout		7,859	82.7
Registered electors		9,502	
Conservative win (new seat)			

General election 1886: Howdenshire
Party	Candidate	Votes	%	±%
Conservative	Arthur Duncombe	Unopposed		
Conservative hold				

=== Elections in the 1890s ===
Woodhouse

General election 1892: Howdenshire
Party	Candidate	Votes	%	±%
Conservative	William Wilson-Todd	3,998	52.3	N/A
Liberal	James Woodhouse	3,648	47.7	New
Majority		350	4.6	N/A
Turnout		7,646	80.5	N/A
Registered electors		9,499		
Conservative hold		Swing	N/A	

Wilson-Todd

General election 1895: Howdenshire
Party	Candidate	Votes	%	±%
Conservative	William Wilson-Todd	Unopposed		
Conservative hold				

=== Elections in the 1900s ===
General election 1900: Howdenshire
Party	Candidate	Votes	%	±%
Conservative	William Wilson-Todd	Unopposed		
Conservative hold				

General election 1906: Howdenshire
Party	Candidate	Votes	%	±%
Conservative	Henry Harrison-Broadley	4,763	53.4	N/A
Liberal	Percy George Reginald Benson	4,150	46.6	New
Majority		613	6.8	N/A
Turnout		8,913	90.1	N/A
Registered electors		9,893		
Conservative hold		Swing	N/A	

=== Elections in the 1910s ===
General election January 1910: Howdenshire
Party	Candidate	Votes	%	±%
Conservative	Henry Harrison-Broadley	5,423	56.4	+3.0
Liberal	Francis Benedict Vincent Norris	4,186	43.6	−3.0
Majority		1,237	12.8	+6.0
Turnout		9,609	90.7	+0.6
Registered electors		10,597		
Conservative hold		Swing	+3.0	

General election December 1910: Howdenshire
Party	Candidate	Votes	%	±%
Conservative	Henry Harrison-Broadley	5,016	56.4	±0.0
Liberal	Francis Benedict Vincent Norris	3,885	43.6	±0.0
Majority		1,131	12.8	±0.0
Turnout		8,901	84.0	−6.7
Registered electors		10,597		
Conservative hold		Swing	±0.0	

General Election 1914–15:

Another General Election was required to take place before the end of 1915. The political parties had been making preparations for an election to take place and by July 1914, the following candidates had been selected;

- Unionist: Henry Harrison-Broadley
- Liberal: Thomas Fenby

1915 Howdenshire by-election
Party	Candidate	Votes	%	±%
Unionist	Stanley Jackson	Unopposed		
Unionist hold				

Fenby

General election 1918: Howdenshire
Party		Candidate	Votes	%	±%
C	Unionist	Stanley Jackson	9,023	67.3	+10.9
	Liberal	Thomas Fenby	4,384	32.7	−10.9
Majority			4,639	34.6	+21.8
Turnout			13,407	57.1	−26.9
Registered electors			23,481		
	Unionist hold		Swing	+10.9	
C indicates candidate endorsed by the coalition government.

=== Elections in the 1920s ===
General election 1922: Howdenshire
Party	Candidate	Votes	%	±%
Unionist	Stanley Jackson	10,748	60.5	−6.8
National Farmers' Union	Herbert John Winn	7,021	39.5	New
Majority		3,727	21.0	−13.6
Turnout		17,769	71.1	+14.0
Registered electors		24,975		
Unionist hold		Swing		

General election 1923: Howdenshire
Party	Candidate	Votes	%	±%
Unionist	Stanley Jackson	Unopposed		
Unionist hold				

General election 1924: Howdenshire
Party	Candidate	Votes	%	±%
Unionist	Stanley Jackson	Unopposed		
Unionist hold				

1926 Howdenshire by-election
Party	Candidate	Votes	%	±%
Unionist	William Carver	10,653	54.2	N/A
Liberal	Frederick Linfield	6,668	34.0	New
Labour	John William Kneeshaw	2,318	11.8	New
Majority		3,985	20.2	N/A
Turnout		19,639	73.6	N/A
Registered electors		26,682		
Unionist hold		Swing	N/A	

General election 1929: Howdenshire
Party	Candidate	Votes	%	±%
Unionist	William Carver	13,823	51.2	N/A
Liberal	Edward Baker	13,170	48.8	N/A
Majority		653	2.4	N/A
Turnout		26,993	76.8	N/A
Registered electors		35,164		
Unionist hold		Swing	N/A	

=== Elections in the 1930s ===
General election 1931: Howdenshire
Party	Candidate	Votes	%	±%
Conservative	William Carver	Unopposed		
Conservative hold				

General election 1935: Howdenshire
Party	Candidate	Votes	%	±%
Conservative	William Carver	18,155	63.9	N/A
Liberal	Edward Baker	7,837	27.5	New
Labour	James Richardson	2,459	8.6	New
Majority		10,318	36.4	N/A
Turnout		28,451	69.2	N/A
Conservative hold		Swing		

=== Elections in the 1940s ===
General Election 1939–40: Another General Election was required to take place before the end of 1940. The political parties had been making preparations for an election to take place from 1939 and by the end of this year, the following candidates had been selected;

- Conservative: Clifford Glossop

General election 1945: Howdenshire
Party	Candidate	Votes	%	±%
Conservative	Clifford Glossop	21,348	55.9	−8.0
Labour Co-op	Thomas Neville	11,161	29.2	+20.6
Liberal	John Edward Wilson	5,669	14.9	−12.6
Majority		10,187	26.7	−9.7
Turnout		38,178	71.3	+2.1
Conservative hold		Swing		

1947 Howdenshire by-election
Party	Candidate	Votes	%	±%
Conservative	George Odey	23,344	64.0	+8.1
Labour Co-op	Thomas Neville	9,298	25.5	−3.7
Liberal	John Edward Wilson	3,819	10.5	−4.4
Majority		14,046	38.5	+11.8
Turnout		36,461		
Conservative hold		Swing		

== Sources ==
- Leigh Rayment's Historical List of MPs – Constituencies beginning with "H" (part 4)
