= 1915 Howdenshire by-election =

UK Parliamentary by-election

The 1915 Howdenshire by-election was held on 10 February 1915. The by-election was held due to the death of the incumbent Conservative MP, Henry Harrison-Broadley. It was won by the Conservative candidate Stanley Jackson who was unopposed due to a war-time electoral pact.
