= John Haslem (artist) =

English painter

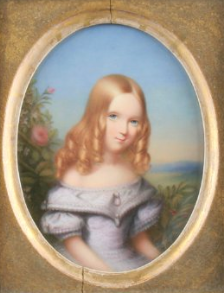
Lady Cecilia Lennox (Portrait miniature on porcelain)

John Haslem (1808–1884), was an English china and enamel painter, and writer. He painted many portrait miniatures of Queen Victoria, the Royal Family and other nobility.

== Life and work ==
Haslem was born in 1808 at Carrington in Cheshire (now part of Greater Manchester). He left home as a young boy to live in Derby with his uncle James Thomason, who went on to manage the Derby China factory. He studied under local ceramic artist, George Hancock, and first devoted himself to flower-painting, but subsequently took to figure-painting, in which he was very successful.

Haslem painted the head of Lord Byron for the Duke of Sussex as a present for the King of Greece, and at the Duke's instigation came to London and studied under Edmund Thomas Parris. He copied many pictures in miniature on enamel, and was a frequent exhibitor at the Royal Academy from 1836 to 1865. In 1842 he won a medal from the Society of Arts for a portrait painted on china. He painted a small enamel portrait of Queen Victoria, and this led to many other commissions from the Royal Family and nobility, especially for copies of ancestral portraits. Papers relating to Haslem's career including a letter of his are held by Derby Museum and Art Gallery.

Haslem was also in demand, by jewellers and art dealers, and on one occasion was employed to paint a set of enamels in imitation of Petitot, which were so successful that they appeared in the miniature exhibitions at the South Kensington Museum, in 1862 and 1865, as the work of Petitot himself.

In 1857, Haslem returned to Derby to live with his uncle and remained there until his death in 1884. In 1876 he had published a history of "The Old Derby China Factory" (pub. George Bell). Haslem gave his collection of porcelain to Derby Museum including the Prentice Plate which he had been lucky enough to buy in London. The Prentice Plate was used by apprentices at porcelain painting in Derby and this plate was a demonstration of William Billingsley's skills when he worked there. This plate is now on display at Derby Museum.
