= William Carver (politician) =

British politician (1868–1961)

Carver in 1931.

William Henton Carver (27 May 1868 – 28 January 1961) was a Conservative Party politician in the United Kingdom who served as a member of parliament (MP) for Howdenshire from 1926 to 1945.

Carver was re-appointed a captain in the 3rd (Militia) Battalion, the King's Own Yorkshire Light Infantry on 7 February 1903.

He was first elected at a by-election in 1926, following the resignation of the Conservative MP Stanley Jackson to take up the post of Governor of Bengal. Carver held the seat until he stood down at the 1945 general election.

A steam locomotive of the LNER Thompson Class B1 was named after him.

== Sources ==
- Craig, F. W. S. (1983) [1969]. British parliamentary election results 1918-1949 (3rd ed.). Chichester: Parliamentary Research Services. ISBN 0-900178-06-X.

Parliament of the United Kingdom
Preceded by Stanley Jackson	Member of Parliament for Howdenshire; 1926 – 1945	Succeeded by Clifford Glossop
