= John Kneeshaw =

British political activist

John William Kneeshaw (25 August 1878 – 25 October 1960) was a British political activist.

Born in Market Weighton near Kingston-upon-Hull, Kneeshaw became a bricklayer and joined the Independent Labour Party (ILP). He moved to Birmingham to become a full-time organiser for the ILP, and in 1911 was elected to the city council, serving until 1919. He served for several years as the Midlands representative on the National Administrative Council of the ILP, and was also active in the Union of Democratic Control. He was adopted as the Labour Party's Prospective Parliamentary Candidate for Birmingham West in 1914. The expected election was not held due to World War I. Kneeshaw opposed the war, and was fined £51 for distributing anti-war leaflets.

At the 1918 United Kingdom general election, Kneeshaw contested Birmingham Ladywood. He took second place, behind Neville Chamberlain, but only 19.0% of the vote. He became the ILP's Organising Secretary in 1922. He stood again for Labour in the 1926 Howdenshire by-election, only handing his nomination papers in ten minutes before the deadline, as he mistakenly believed they should be delivered to Beverley, rather than Pocklington. He polled poorly, taking third place and losing his deposit.

In 1928, Kneeshaw became the Labour Party's Lancashire Area Organiser, and soon fell into conflict with the ILP, which complained that he was acting as a "witchfinder" attempting to disqualify left-wing ILP members from Parliamentary candidacies. The post was broadened to North West Regional Organiser in 1931, and Kneeshaw remained in the role until his retirement. During World War II, he served as Welfare Officer for miners in Whitehaven.

Party political offices
Preceded by Leonard Hall	Midlands Division representative on the National Administrative Council of the Independent Labour Party; 1911–1917	Succeeded by J. W. Murby
