= East Riding of Yorkshire (constituency) =

Parliamentary constituency in the United Kingdom, 1832–1885

- Former county constituency for the House of Commons
- From 1832–1868. Extract from 1837 result: the seaside and riverside 'doubly' blue area.
- County: East Riding of Yorkshire

1832–1885
- Seats: Two
- Created from: Yorkshire
- Replaced by: Buckrose, Holderness and Howdenshire

The East Riding of Yorkshire was a parliamentary constituency covering the East Riding of Yorkshire, omitting Beverley residents save a small minority of Beverley residents who also qualified on property grounds to vote in the county seat (mainly business-owning forty shilling freeholders). It returned two Members of Parliament to the House of Commons of the Parliament of the United Kingdom. A brief earlier guise of the seat covered the changed franchise of the First Protectorate Parliament and Second Protectorate Parliament during a fraction of the twenty years of England and Wales (Scotland and Ireland) existed as a republic.

== First and Second Protectorate parliaments existence 1654–1658 ==
The seat existed for the June 1654 to January 1655 parliament and for that following (July 1656 to September 1656). The East Riding electorate summoned four members simultaneously.

Parliaments of the Protectorate
No.	Summoned	Elected	Assembled	Dissolved	Sessions	Speaker	Note
1st	1 June 1654	1654	3 September 1654	22 January 1655	1	William Lenthall	1st Protectorate Parliament
2nd	10 July 1656	1656	17 September 1656	4 February 1658	2	Thomas Widdrington	2nd Protectorate Parliament
2nd	10 July 1656	1656	17 September 1656	4 February 1658	2	Bulstrode Whitelocke	2nd Protectorate Parliament
3rd	9 December 1658	1658–59	27 January 1659	22 April 1659	1	Chaloner Chute	3rd Protectorate Parliament
3rd	9 December 1658	1658–59	27 January 1659	22 April 1659	1	Lislebone Long (Deputy)	3rd Protectorate Parliament
3rd	9 December 1658	1658–59	27 January 1659	22 April 1659	1	Thomas Bampfylde	3rd Protectorate Parliament

== Creation and abolition ==
The constituency was created by the Reform Act 1832 as the four-seat Yorkshire was divided in three, two-seat divisions for the 1832 general election. The divisions were abolished by the Redistribution of Seats Act 1885. It was replaced for the 1885 general election by single-member seats: Buckrose, Holderness and Howdenshire.

== Results ==
Candidates were elected unopposed at most of the elections throughout its existence; contested elections took place in 1837, 1868 and 1880. In these contests two Conservative candidates defeated a single Whig or Liberal.

== Members of Parliament ==
=== MPs 1654–1658 (Protectorate Parliaments) ===
Election	First member	Second member	Third member	Fourth member
1654	Sir William Strickland	Hugh Bethell	Richard Robinson	Walter Strickland
1656	Robert Lilburne	George Eure, 7th Baron Eure	Richard Darley	Hugh Darley

=== MPs 1832–1885 ===
Election	1st member	1st party	2nd member	2nd party
1832	constituency created by division of the Yorkshire constituency			
1832	Richard Bethell	Tory	Paul Thompson	Whig
1834	Richard Bethell	Conservative	Paul Thompson	Whig
1837	Richard Bethell	Conservative	Henry Broadley	Conservative
1841	The Lord Hotham	Conservative	Henry Broadley	Conservative
1851 by-election	The Lord Hotham	Conservative	Hon. Arthur Duncombe	Conservative
1868	Christopher Sykes	Conservative	William Harrison-Broadley	Conservative
1885	constituency abolished: see Buckrose, Holderness and Howdenshire			

== Election results ==
=== Elections in the 1830s ===
General election 1832: East Riding of Yorkshire (2 seats)
Party	Candidate	Votes	%
Tory	Richard Bethell	Unopposed	
Whig	Paul Thompson	Unopposed	
Registered electors		5,559	
Tory win (new seat)			
Whig win (new seat)			

General election 1835: East Riding of Yorkshire (2 seats)
Party	Candidate	Votes	%
Conservative	Richard Bethell	Unopposed	
Whig	Paul Thompson	Unopposed	
Registered electors		5,140	
Conservative hold			
Whig hold			

General election 1837: East Riding of Yorkshire (2 seats)
Party	Candidate	Votes	%
Conservative	Richard Bethell	3,592	36.5
Conservative	Henry Broadley	3,257	33.1
Whig	Paul Thompson	2,985	30.4
Majority		272	2.7
Turnout		6,204	86.4
Registered electors		7,180	
Conservative hold			
Conservative gain from Whig			

=== Elections in the 1840s ===
General election 1841: East Riding of Yorkshire
Party	Candidate	Votes	%	±%
Conservative	Beaumont Hotham	Unopposed		
Conservative	Henry Broadley	Unopposed		
Registered electors		7,640		
Conservative hold				
Conservative hold				

General election 1847: East Riding of Yorkshire
Party	Candidate	Votes	%	±%
Conservative	Beaumont Hotham	Unopposed		
Conservative	Henry Broadley	Unopposed		
Registered electors		7,740		
Conservative hold				
Conservative hold				

=== Elections in the 1850s ===
Broadley's death caused a by-election.

By-election, 7 October 1851: East Riding of Yorkshire
Party	Candidate	Votes	%	±%
Conservative	Arthur Duncombe	Unopposed		
Conservative hold				

Duncombe was appointed a Lord Commissioner of the Admiralty, requiring a by-election.

By-election, 9 March 1852: East Riding of Yorkshire
Party	Candidate	Votes	%	±%
Conservative	Arthur Duncombe	Unopposed		
Conservative hold				

General election 1852: East Riding of Yorkshire
Party	Candidate	Votes	%	±%
Conservative	Beaumont Hotham	Unopposed		
Conservative	Arthur Duncombe	Unopposed		
Registered electors		7,538		
Conservative hold				
Conservative hold				

General election 1857: East Riding of Yorkshire
Party	Candidate	Votes	%	±%
Conservative	Beaumont Hotham	Unopposed		
Conservative	Arthur Duncombe	Unopposed		
Registered electors		7,382		
Conservative hold				
Conservative hold				

General election 1859: East Riding of Yorkshire
Party	Candidate	Votes	%	±%
Conservative	Beaumont Hotham	Unopposed		
Conservative	Arthur Duncombe	Unopposed		
Registered electors		7,221		
Conservative hold				
Conservative hold				

=== Elections in the 1860s ===
General election 1865: East Riding of Yorkshire
Party	Candidate	Votes	%	±%
Conservative	Beaumont Hotham	Unopposed		
Conservative	Arthur Duncombe	Unopposed		
Registered electors		7,400		
Conservative hold				
Conservative hold				

General election 1868: East Riding of Yorkshire
Party	Candidate	Votes	%	±%
Conservative	Christopher Sykes	6,299	43.5	N/A
Conservative	William Harrison-Broadley	5,587	38.6	N/A
Liberal	Benjamin Blaydes Haworth	2,603	18.0	New
Majority		2,984	20.6	N/A
Turnout		8,546 (est.)	78.9 (est.)	N/A
Registered electors		10,827		
Conservative hold				
Conservative hold				

=== Elections in the 1870s ===
General election 1874: East Riding of Yorkshire
Party	Candidate	Votes	%	±%
Conservative	Christopher Sykes	Unopposed		
Conservative	William Harrison-Broadley	Unopposed		
Registered electors		10,722		
Conservative hold				
Conservative hold				

=== Elections in the 1880s ===
General election 1880: East Riding of Yorkshire
Party	Candidate	Votes	%	±%
Conservative	Christopher Sykes	4,927	37.4	N/A
Conservative	William Harrison-Broadley	4,527	34.4	N/A
Liberal	Henry John Lindley Wood	3,707	28.2	New
Majority		820	6.2	N/A
Turnout		8,434 (est.)	81.0 (est.)	N/A
Registered electors		10,414		
Conservative hold				
Conservative hold				
