= Thomas Hornor (surveyor) =

English land surveyor, artist and inventor

Thomas Hornor (1785–1844) was an English land surveyor, artist, and inventor.

Born on 12 June 1785 into the Quaker family of a grocer in Hull, Hornor (sometimes spelled Horner) learned surveying and engineering from his brother-in-law. Soon after 1800 he surveyed the Free Grammar School in Manchester, and was settled in London by 1807. He lived in Kentish Town, Chancery Lane, and then Church Court, Inner Temple, whence he undertook valuations as well as surveys and levelling of canals and drains. He produced a huge plan of Clerkenwell (1808 and 1813), and advocated a decorative style for 'picturesque landscape gardening' and 'panoramic chorometry' for drawing out estate plans, as described in 'Description of an Improved Method of Delineating Estates' (1813).

In 1814 Hornor was advertising himself in S Wales as a ‘Pictural Delineator of Estates’ and soliciting commissions for the summer. He was successful and became wealthy producing bound portfolio volumes of plans, panoramas, watercolour paintings, all linked by exquisite copperplate handwritten accounts of tours in the area, for at least nine wealthy families with whom he appears to have mixed as an equal; at least one still bears the price, 500 guineas. The paintings have sometimes been broken out from the original volumes and are interesting from topographic (especially the Neath and Taff valleys, and Glamorgan coast), historic (e.g. tin works around Neath; iron works at Merthyr Tydfil), technical (demonstrating the use of his camera obscura; use of fold-outs), and artistic (the same scene is often worked up in different ways) points of view. He has been noted as having had a penchant for painting moonlit scenes, and he also painted inside the Porth-yr-Ogof cave, whereas other artists painted only from outside.

By 1820, he was in London again and began a project to depict the view of London from the dome of St Paul's Cathedral. Initial plans to sell panoramic views came to nothing but an elaborate scheme to create a 360 degree panorama on the inside of a dome of the Colosseum, specially built in Regents Park (and resembling the Roman Pantheon rather than the Colosseum), came to fruition but at such expense that his principal backer, Rowland Stephenson MP, had to flee to America in 1828, soon followed by Hornor. The Colosseum included a device to take "the visitor who pays an extra price" to a suitably elevated viewpoint: Hornor had designed the first passenger lift in England.

Hornor lived in New York from 1829 until his death, in penury, in 1844. The Colosseum was demolished in 1874.
