= Edwards baronets of Pye Nest (1866) =

Baronets of Pye Nest
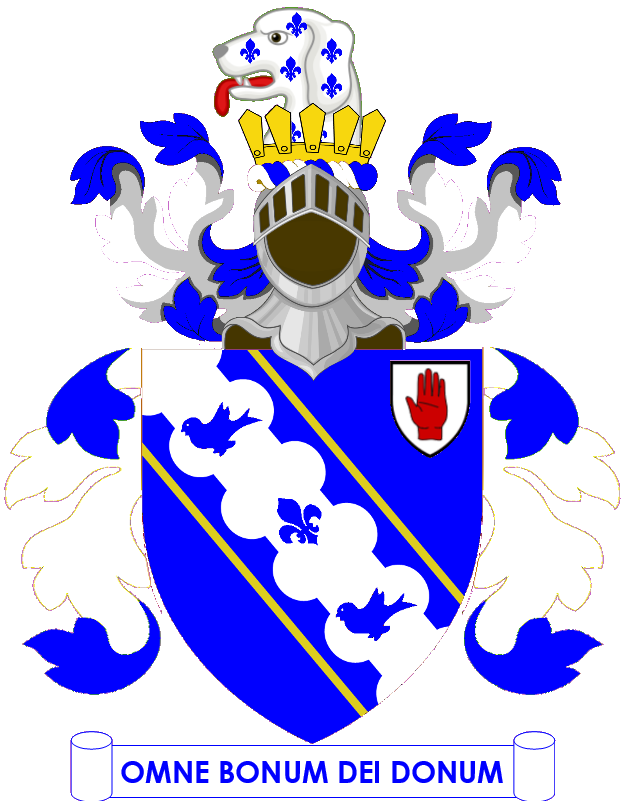
- Crest: Out of a crown vallery Or a talbot's head Argent seme-de-lis Azure.
- Shield: Azure on a bend nebuly Argent cottised Or a fleur-de-lis between two martlets of the field
- Motto: Omne Bonum Dei Donum

The Edwards baronetcy, of Pye Nest in the County of York, was created in the Baronetage of the United Kingdom on 3 August 1866 for Henry Edwards. He represented Halifax and Beverley in the House of Commons as a Conservative. He served as High Sheriff of Yorkshire in 1871.

== Edwards baronets, of Pye Nest (1866) ==
- Sir Henry Edwards, 1st Baronet (1812–1886)
- Sir Henry Coster Lea Edwards, 2nd Baronet (1840–1896)
- Sir John Henry Priestley Churchill Edwards, 3rd Baronet (1889–1942)
- Sir Henry Charles Serrell Priestley Edwards, 4th Baronet (1893–1963)
- Sir Christopher John Churchill Edwards, 5th Baronet (born 1941)

The heir apparent is the present holder's son David Charles Priestley Edwards (born 1974).
