= Eaton Place =

Street in Belgravia, London

Coordinates: 51.49702°N 0.15283°W

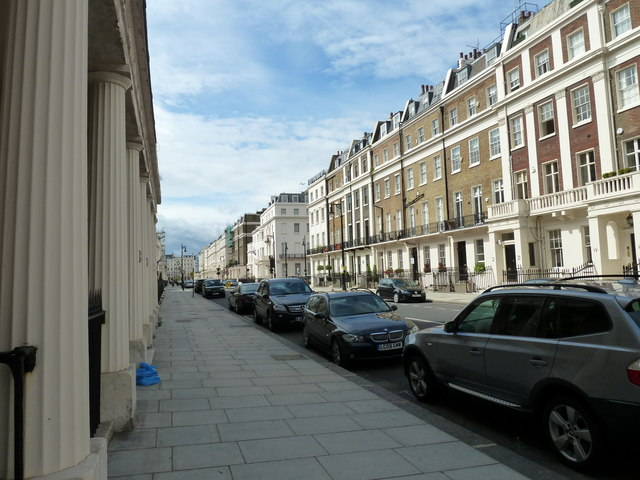
Eaton Place in 2010

Eaton Place is a street in the Belgravia district of London, England.

It begins at the junction with Upper Belgrave Street, to the north-west of Eaton Square. The street runs south-west, parallel to Eaton Square, down to the junction with Chesham Street. It then turns and continues south-east into Eaton Square.

== Notable events, establishments and inhabitants ==
- The 19th-century sugar-manufacture expert Shute Barrington Moody (who was the brother of the founder of British Columbia, Major-General Richard Clement Moody) resided at Burton Street (which is now South Eaton Place).
- John Towneley, MP for Beverley and later a family trustee at the British Museum, lived at No. 76 in 1860.
- The Embassy of Hungary, London, is at No. 35.
- After Great Britain's recognition of the communist regime in Poland as the legitimate Polish government, the antecedent Polish government-in-exile relocated from the Polish embassy to No. 43, which had been the president's personal residence, where it stayed until 1990.
- The 1971 TV-series Upstairs, Downstairs is supposed to be set at a fictional No. 165 Eaton Place. It used number 65 and painted a "1" in front of the house's number for filming.
- On 22 June 1922, Field Marshal Sir Henry Wilson, 1st Baronet, was assassinated outside his home at No. 36 by Irish Republican Army members Reginald Dunne and Joseph O'Sullivan.
- The actress Joan Collins resides in Eaton Place.
