= Edwards baronets =

Set index for Edwards baronets

There have been seven baronetcies created for persons with the surname Edwards, three in the Baronetage of England and four in the Baronetage of the United Kingdom. One creation is extant as of 2026.

- Edwards baronets of Shrewsbury (1645): see Edwardes baronets
- Edwards baronets of Shrewsbury (1678): see Edwardes baronets
- Edwards baronets of York (1691)
- Edwards baronets of Garth (1838): see Sir John Edwards, 1st Baronet (died 1850)
- Edwards baronets of Pye Nest (1866)
- Edwards baronets of Knighton (1907): see Sir Francis Edwards, 1st Baronet (1852–1927)
- Edwards baronets of Treforis (1921)
