= William Wells (1818–1889) =

English Liberal Party politician

William Wells (15 March 1818 – 1 May 1889) was an English Liberal Party politician who sat in the House of Commons from 1852 to 1857 and from 1868 to 1874.

Wells was the son of Captain William Wells, R.N. and his wife Lady Elizabeth Proby, daughter of John Proby, 1st Earl of Carysfort, and grandson of Vice-Admiral Thomas Wells, of Holme, whose father, William, had inherited the estate from his wife's uncle, Thomas Truman, in 1768. He was educated at Harrow School and at Balliol College, Oxford, and served in the 1st Life Guards from 1839 until 1843. In 1826 he inherited Holmewood Hall in Huntingdonshire from his father. He also inherited the Redleaf estate in Kent from his great-uncle William.

He was a J.P. and a deputy lieutenant for Kent and Huntingdonshire.

At the 1852 general election Wells was elected as a member of parliament (MP) for the borough of Beverley. He held the seat until his defeat in the 1857 by the Liberal Edward Glover. An election petition was lodged by Wells on the grounds that Glover was not duly qualified, because he did not meet the property-holding requirements. The issue had been raised during the election, and handbills circulated to that effect, but Glover had denied the allegations. On 3 August 1853, the committee ruled that Glover had not been duly qualified, and that his election was void. A by-election was held on 11 August 1853, when Wells stood again, but was defeated by the Conservative candidate Henry Edwards.

Wells contested the City of Peterborough at the 1852 general election, where he was the third-placed of the three Liberal candidates. He won the seat at the 1868 general election, defeating the Liberal MP Thomson Hankey, a former Governor of the Bank of England. Wells remained an MP for Peterborough and held the seat until the 1874 general election, when he did not stand again.

He was appointed High Sheriff of Cambridgeshire and Huntingdonshire for 1875. He was also a keen agriculturalist and President of the Royal Agricultural Society in 1880.

Wells died at the age of 71. He had married Lady Louisa Wemyss-Charteris, the daughter of the Francis Wemyss-Charteris, 9th Earl of Wemyss in 1854. They had no children.

Parliament of the United Kingdom
Preceded by John Towneley; Sackville Lane-Fox	Member of Parliament for Beverley; 1852–1857; With: Hon. Francis Charles Lawley 1852–1854; Hon. Arthur Hamilton-Gordon 1854–1857	Succeeded by Edward Glover; Hon. William Denison
Preceded by Thomson Hankey; George Hammond Whalley	Member of Parliament for Peterborough; 1868–1874; With: George Hammond Whalley	Succeeded by Thomson Hankey; George Hammond Whalley
