= Sir John Edwards, 1st Baronet =

Sir John Edwards, 1st Baronet may refer to:

- Sir John Bryn Edwards, 1st Baronet (1889–1922), Welsh ironmaster
- Sir John Edwards, 1st Baronet, of Garth (1770–1850), Welsh politician
