= Hungarians in the United Kingdom =

Total population
- Hungarian-born residents in the United Kingdom: 104,110 (2021/22 Census) (Note: Does not include ethnic Hungarians born in the United Kingdom or those with Hungarian ancestry); England: 93,036 (2021); Scotland: 6,600 (2022); Wales: 2,363 (2021); Northern Ireland: 2,111 (2021); Previous estimates: 52,250 (2011 Census); 98,000 (2019 ONS estimate)

Regions with significant populations
- London

Languages
- Hungarian, English

Religion
- Roman Catholicism, Greek Catholicism, Protestantism, Irreligion

Related ethnic groups
- Hungarian diaspora

Hungarians in the United Kingdom (Hungarian: Magyarok az Egyesült Királyságban [ˈmɒɟɒrok ˈɒz ˈɛɟːɛʃylt ˈkiraːjʃaːɡbɒn]) include Hungarian-born immigrants to the UK and their descendants, of whom there are a substantial number. Since Hungary joined the European Union in 2004, the UK's Hungarian population has grown significantly. Although official ONS estimates are that there were about 98,000.

== History ==
The first Hungarian student known by name to have matriculated at Oxford University was one Nicolaus de Ungeria, and it is likely that he spent some time in London. Scores of Hungarian students came to study at English and Scottish universities, but the first to settle in London for good was János Bánffyhunyadi (1576–1646) in 1608. He dabbled in alchemy and became a lecturer in chemistry at Gresham College. Marrying an Englishwoman, he had a house in London, and was often visited by fellow countrymen passing through. In 1659, after a short spell in Oxford, Pál Jászberényi settled in London, where he opened a public school for the children of noblemen. He taught them Latin, using innovative techniques. One of the most resourceful scholars who made their home in London at the time of Pepys and Wren was János Mezolaki. He was teaching Latin and philosophy, and died as a patient of Bedlam, in 1693.

As with other displaced persons from Central and Eastern Europe, many Hungarians came to Britain during and after World War II. Furthermore, up to 200,000 Hungarians left their home country after the revolution of 1956, and settled in countries across the Western world — especially those that formed the Western Bloc. This included refugees to the UK, such as the actor Sandor Elès.

Since Hungary joined the European Union in 2004, the UK's Hungarian population has grown significantly. It was estimated that 13,159 Hungarian-born people were resident in the UK at the time of the 2001 UK Census. According to the 2011 census there were 48,308 Hungarian-born residents in England and Wales. 17,803 were in London where they made up 0.22% of the population. Just 576 were in North East England, making up 0.02% of the population there. The Hungarian-born population in England and Wales in 2021/22 was 95,399, 1% of the population of Hungary. By comparison, the Romanian-born population was 538,840, 2.8% of the population of Romania, and the Bulgarian-born population was 150,254, 2.3% of the population of Bulgaria.

Based on latest figures, approximately 55% of the Hungarian-born population are in London and South East England, compared to 61% of the Bulgarian-born population, 41% of the Polish-born population and 30% of the total population. There were also 2,943 Hungarian-born residents in Scotland out of a total population of 5,295,403 (0.06%), and 999 Hungarian-born residents in Northern Ireland out of a total population of 1,810,863 (0.06%). This gives a 2011 census total for the whole of the United Kingdom of 52,250.

The Office for National Statistics estimated that in 2019 there were 98,000 Hungarian-born people resident in the UK: 47,000 males and 50,000 females. However, there are other estimates that between 200,000 and 220,000 Hungarians were living in the UK in 2020.

== Notable Hungarian immigrants and Britons of Hungarian origin ==
=== Literature and media ===
- Oscar Deutsch (1893–1941) – founder of Odeon Cinemas
- Frank Furedi (Füredi Ferenc) – commentator
- John Halas (Halász János) (1912–1995) – animator
- Arthur Koestler (Kösztler Artur) (1905–1983) – novelist, journalist
- Sir Alexander Korda (1893–1956) – producer, director
- Sebastian Gorka – Military and Intelligence Analyst, Trump Administration Advisor, Social Commentator
- Mina Loy – artist, poet, playwright, novelist
- George Mikes (Mikes György) (1912–1987) – writer
- Baroness Emma Orczy (Orczy Emma) (1865–1947) – writer
- Emeric Pressburger (1902–1988) – screenwriter, film director, producer
- Egon Ronay (Rónay Egon) (1915–2010) – food critic
- Petronella Wyatt – journalist
- George Szirtes – poet
- Andor Kraszna-Krausz – publisher, photographer

=== Musicians and performers ===
- Miki Berenyi – singer, songwriter (Lush)
- Joe Bugner (born József Kreul Bugner; 1950–2025) – heavyweight boxer and actor
- Sandor Éles (1936–2002) – actor
- Justine Frischmann – artist, musician (Elastica)
- Stephen Fry – writer, actor
- Romola Garai – actress
- Leslie Howard (1893–1943) – actor
- Princess Julia (born Julia Fodor) – DJ, music writer
- Kerry Katona – singer
- Mark Knopfler – singer, songwriter (Dire Straits)
- Michael McIntyre – comedian
- Edina Ronay – fashion designer, former actress
- Steve Sarossy – actor
- Catherine Schell – actress
- Georgia Slowe – actress
- Sir Georg Solti (Solti György) (1912–1997) – conductor
- Rachel Weisz – actress

=== Politicians ===
- Leo Amery (1873–1955) – Conservative Party politician

=== Science ===
- Dennis Gabor, CBE, FRS (Gábor Dénes) (1900–1979) – Nobel Prize–winning physicist
- Gustav Wikkenhauser (1901–1974) – engineer
- Ernő Goldfinger (1902–1987) – architect, furniture designer
- Nicholas Kurti, FRS (1908–1988) – physicist
- Imre Lakatos (1922–1974) – philosopher
- Michael Polanyi (Polányi Mihály) (1891–1976) – scientist, polymath
- Sir Marc Aurel Stein (Stein Aurél) (1862–1943) – orientalist

=== Business ===
- George Soros (born 1930) – investor, business magnate, and philanthropist

=== Sport ===
- Dominik Kozma, swimmer
- Johanna Konta, tennis player
- Conrad Balatoni, footballer
- Tibor Szabo (1959–2024), footballer
- Sammie Szmodics, footballer of Irish descent
- Rebeka Simon, swimmer
- Callum Styles, footballer
- Imre Varadi, footballer of Italian descent

== See also ==
- Hungarian diaspora
- Hungary–United Kingdom relations
- Modern immigration to the United Kingdom

== Bibliography ==
- Zakar, Dr. Andras: The Persecution of Jews in Hungary and the Catholic Church
