= Arthur Hamilton-Gordon, 1st Baron Stanmore =

British Liberal Party politician and colonial administrator (1829 – 1912)

The Right Honourable The Lord Stanmore GCMG KStJ
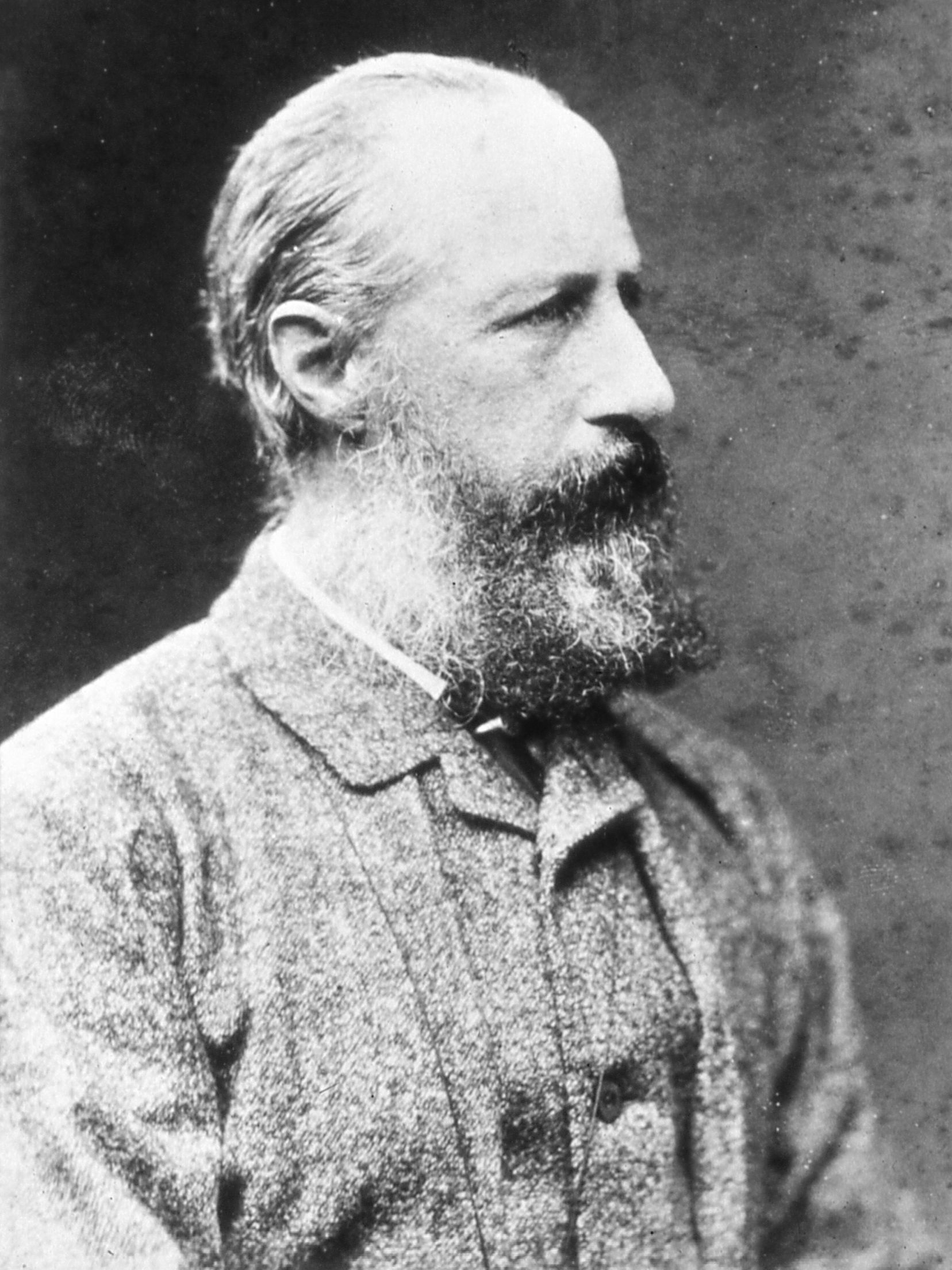
- Arthur Gordon circa 1870–1880.

9th Lieutenant Governor of New Brunswick
- In office 26 October 1861 – 30 September 1866
- Monarch: Victoria
- Premier: Samuel Leonard Tilley; Albert James Smith; Peter Mitchell
- Preceded by: John Manners Sutton
- Succeeded by: Charles Hastings Doyle

19th Governor of Trinidad
- In office 7 November 1866 – 1870
- Monarch: Victoria
- Preceded by: E. E. Bushworth
- Succeeded by: James Robert Longden

11th Governor of British Mauritius
- In office 21 February 1871 – 18 August 1874
- Monarch: Victoria
- Preceded by: Sir Henry Barkly
- Succeeded by: Sir Arthur Phayre

1st High Commissioner for the Western Pacific
- In office June 1875 – January 1880
- Monarch: Victoria
- Preceded by: Sir Hercules Robinson
- Succeeded by: Sir William Des Vœux

2nd Governor of Fiji
- In office June 1875 – January 1880
- Monarch: Victoria
- Preceded by: Sir Hercules Robinson
- Succeeded by: Sir William Des Vœux

9th Governor of New Zealand
- In office 29 November 1880 – 24 June 1882
- Monarch: Victoria
- Premier: John Hall; Frederick Whitaker
- Preceded by: Sir Hercules Robinson
- Succeeded by: Sir William Jervois

16th Governor of British Ceylon
- In office 3 December 1883 – 28 May 1890
- Monarch: Victoria
- Preceded by: John Douglas
- Succeeded by: Arthur Havelock (Acting governor)

Personal details
- Born: 26 November 1829 London, England
- Died: 30 January 1912 (aged 82)
- Parent: George Hamilton-Gordon, 4th Earl of Aberdeen (father)
- Education: Trinity College, Cambridge

Arthur Charles Hamilton-Gordon, 1st Baron Stanmore GCMG KStJ (26 November 1829 – 30 January 1912) was a Scottish Liberal Party politician and colonial administrator. He had extensive contact with Prime Minister William Ewart Gladstone.

== Career ==
Gordon was born at Argyll House, his family's townhouse in London, in 1829. He was the youngest son of George Hamilton-Gordon, 4th Earl of Aberdeen and his second wife, Harriet Douglas. His mother was the widow of Viscount Hamilton.

Gordon was educated privately and then at Trinity College, Cambridge, where he was President of the Cambridge Union Society in 1849.

After graduating in 1851, he worked as Assistant Private Secretary to the British Prime Minister (his father) between 1852 and 1855, and was a Member of Parliament (MP) for Beverley from 1854 to 1857. In 1875, the Fiji Islands were created a separate Colony, and Sir Arthur Gordon was appointed the first Governor and Commander-in-Chief of Fiji, until 1880. In connection with this he also received the appointment of Consul-General, and High Commissioner of the Western Pacific, but that gave little additional power. He held a number of colonial governorships:

- Lieutenant-Governor of New Brunswick, 1861–1866, securing New Brunswick's assent to Canadian Confederation
- Governor of Trinidad, 1866–1870.
- 11th Governor of Mauritius, 21 February 1871 – 18 August 1874
- Governor of Fiji from 1875 to 1880.
- High Commissioner for the Western Pacific 1877–1880
- Governor of New Zealand, 29 November 1880 – 24 June 1882
- Governor of Ceylon, 1883–1890.

He was appointed a Knight Commander of the Order of St Michael and St George (KCMG) in 1871, and a Knight Grand Cross of the same Order in 1878. He was created Baron Stanmore, of Great Stanmore, in the County of Middlesex on 21 August 1893.

In 1897, Lord Stanmore became the chairman of the Pacific Islands Company Ltd ('PIC'). Formed by John T. Arundel, PIC was based in London with its trading activities in the Pacific that involved mining phosphate rock on Banaba (then known as Ocean Island) and Nauru. John T. Arundel and Lord Stanmore were responsible for financing the new opportunities and negotiating with the German company that controlled the licences to mine in Nauru. In 1902, the interests of PIC were merged with Jaluit Gesellschaft of Hamburg, to form the Pacific Phosphate Company, ('PPC') to engage in phosphate mining in Banaba and Nauru.

Gordon's ethnographic collection from Fiji, which was assembled during his Governorship, was donated to the British Museum in 1878.

He was appointed a member of the Royal Commission on Historical Manuscripts in March 1900.

== Works ==
- William Ewart Gladstone, Baron Arthur Hamilton-Gordon Stanmore (2009) [1961]. Gladstone-Gordon correspondence, 1851–1896: selections from the private correspondence of a British Prime Minister and a colonial Governor, Volume 51. American Philosophical Society. p. 116. ISBN 9780871695147.(Volume 51, Issue 4 of new series, American Philosophical Society Volume 51, Part 4 of Transactions Series Volume 51, Part 4 of Transactions of the American Philosophical Society new ser v. 51, no. 4)(Original from the University of California)

== Personal life and death ==
On 20 September 1865, Arthur Hamilton-Gordon, wed Rachel Emily Shaw Lefevre in London. The couple had a daughter and a son.

He was appointed a Deputy Lieutenant of Aberdeenshire in 1861.

Arthur Hamilton-Gordon, 1st Baron Stanmore died on 30 January 1912 in Chelsea, London.

== See also ==
- Gordon Falls

Parliament of the United Kingdom
Preceded by William Wells; Francis Charles Lawley	Member of Parliament for Beverley; 1854 – 1857; With: William Wells	Succeeded by Edward Glover; William Denison
Government offices
Preceded by Sir John Henry Thomas Manners-Sutton	Lieutenant-Governor of New Brunswick; 1861–1866	Succeeded by Sir Charles Hastings Doyle
Preceded by E. E. Bushworth (acting)	Governor of Trinidad; 1866–1870	Succeeded by James Robert Longden
Preceded by Sir Henry Barkly	Governor of Mauritius; 1871–1874	Succeeded by Sir Arthur Purves Phayre
Preceded by Sir Hercules Robinson	Governor of Fiji; 1875–1880	Succeeded by Sir William Des Vœux
New creation	High Commissioner for the Western Pacific; 1877–1880	Succeeded by Sir William Des Vœux
Preceded by Sir Hercules Robinson	Governor of New Zealand; 1880–1882	Succeeded by Sir William Jervois
Preceded by John Douglas acting governor	Governor of Ceylon; 1883–1890	Succeeded by Arthur Havelock
Peerage of the United Kingdom
New creation	Baron Stanmore; 1893–1912	Succeeded by George Hamilton-Gordon
