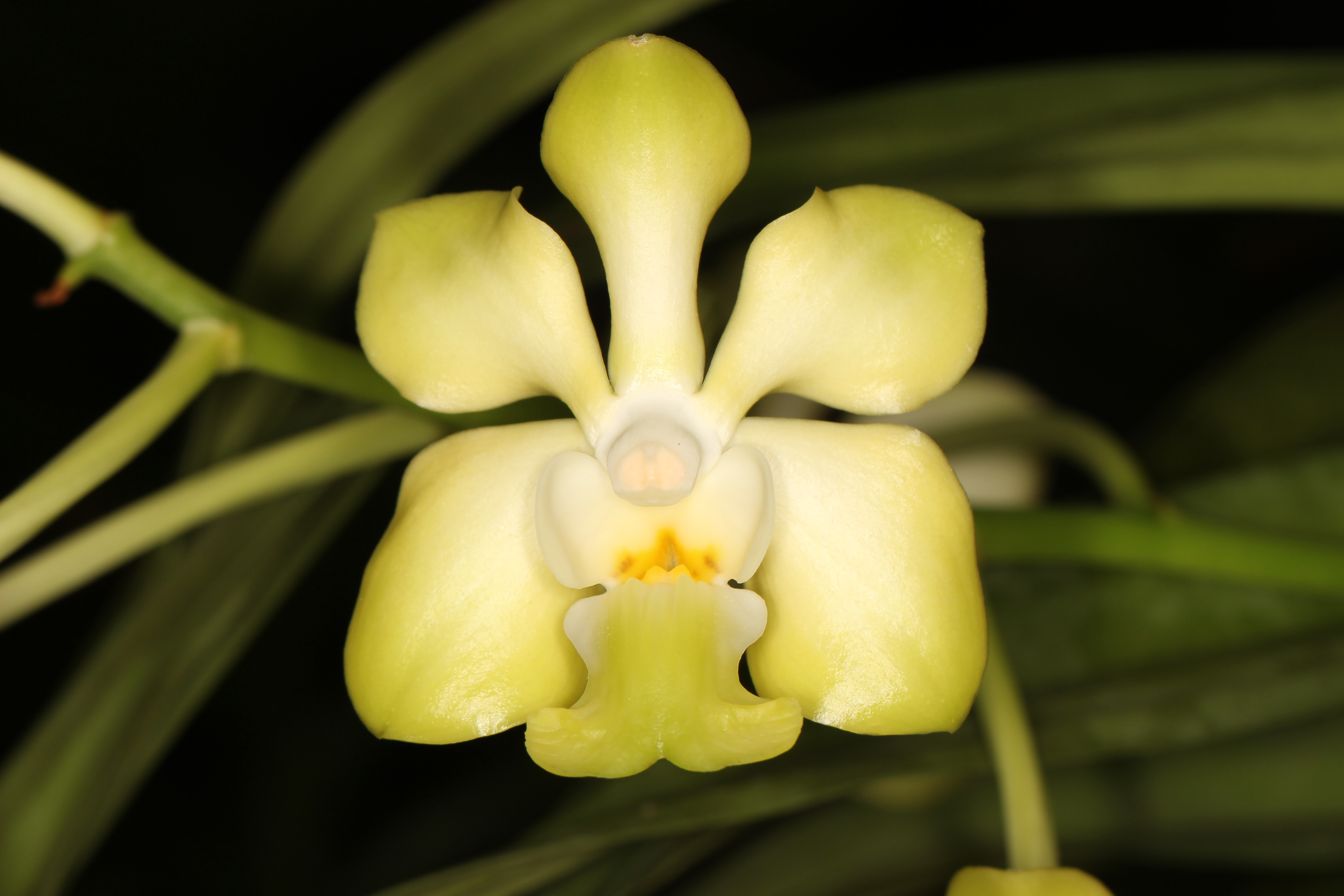
- Vanda denisoniana flower

Scientific classification
- Kingdom: Plantae
- Clade: Tracheophytes
- Clade: Angiosperms
- Clade: Monocots
- Order: Asparagales
- Family: Orchidaceae
- Subfamily: Epidendroideae
- Genus: Vanda
- Species: V. denisoniana

Binomial name
- Vanda denisoniana Benson ex Rchb.f.

Synonyms
- Vanda henryi Schltr.; Vanda denisoniana var. tessellata Guillaumin

= Vanda denisoniana =

Species of orchid

Vanda denisoniana is a species of orchid found from China (Yunnan) to northern Indochina. It was named after Lady Ida Emily Augusta Denison, an orchid enthusiast.
