= Edward Ellerker =

16th-century English politician

Edward Ellerker (c. 1537 – 28 December 1586), of Risby, near Beverley, Yorkshire, was an English politician.

== Family ==
Ellerker's mother and wife were both of the Constable family. His father-in-law was the MP for Yorkshire, Sir Robert Constable. Ellerker was married to Elizabeth Constable, and they had four or five sons.

== Career ==
He was a Member (MP) of the Parliament of England for Beverley in 1571.

Parliament of England
Preceded by Nicholas Bacon; Robert Hall	Member of Parliament for Beverley; 1571; With: Robert Layton	Succeeded by Richard Topcliffe; Thomas Aglionby
