= Gordon Falls =

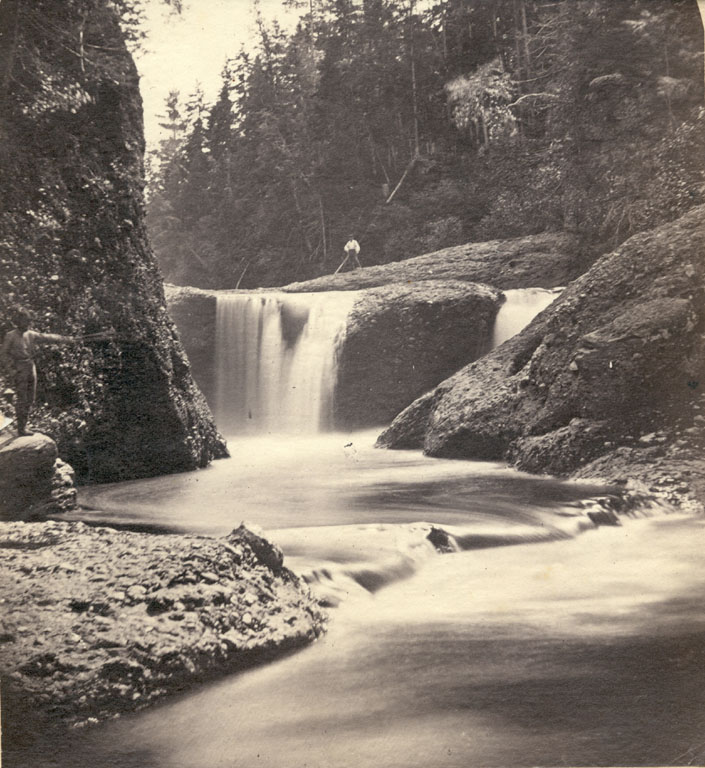
- Gordon Falls, pictured between 1865–1875
- Interactive map of Gordon Falls
- Location: Near Elgin, Albert County, New Brunswick, Canada
- Coordinates: 45°47′3″N 65°5′40″W
- Total height: 6 meters (20 ft)
- Watercourse: Pollett River

Gordon Falls is a Canadian waterfall in Albert County, New Brunswick. Located off River Road just south from Elgin, the falls are part of the Pollett River, which flows between Elgin and Salisbury. The falls are located by the stone bridge, which crosses the Pollett River. The falls are surrounded by cliffs measuring 10–20 meters (33–66 ft), making it a popular destination for swimming and cliff jumping. The area has been subject to major safety concerns by locals due to the amount of incidents and accidents resulting in people being injured or killed.

== Description ==
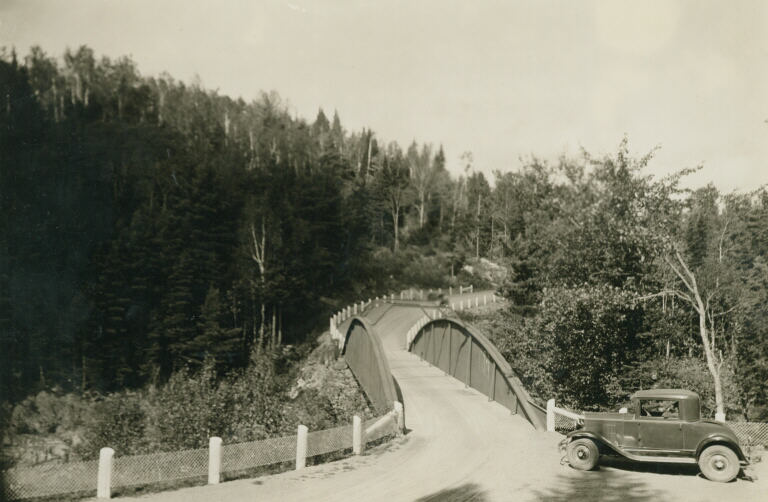
The bridge crossing Pollett River, pictured in 1932

Gordon Falls is named after Arthur Hamilton-Gordon, 1st Baron Stanmore. In 1864, Abner Reid McClelan, the MLA for Albert at the time, gave the falls its name to commemorate Gordon, then-Lieutenant Governor of New Brunswick, while he visited Elgin.

Gordon Falls, the nearby Gibson Falls, and the gorge lying between them are popular cliff jumping and swimming destinations for young tourists, leading to the area becoming the subject of major safety concerns by locals, including firefighters from Elgin who have advised against cliff jumping. The area's drainage basin is difficult to reach, resulting in tourists, who frequent the spot during the summer, jumping off cliffs to reach them.

Safety concerns were made at both falls due to the frequency of incidents and accidents leading to injury or death; fatal accidents have occurred at the falls as early as 1884. In 2008, environmental concerns were further brought up by locals when a nearby rock quarry began development by removing the top from the nearby Tucker Mountain for potential uranium mining operations. On June 10, 2024, two men in their early twenties died from injuries sustained at Gibson Falls.

== See also ==
- List of waterfalls in Canada

== Bibliography ==
- Ganong, William Francis (1917). "Article II". Notes on the natural history and physiography of New Brunswick. Saint John, New Brunswick: Barnes and Company. pp. 105–111.
