= John Towneley (politician) =

English Whig politician

Member of Parliament for Beverley
- In office 1841–1852
- Preceded by: Sackville Lane-Fox; Sir James Hogg, Bt
- Succeeded by: Hon. Francis Charles Lawley; William Wells

Personal details
- Born: 16 February 1806
- Died: 21 February 1878 (aged 72)
- Party: Whig

Colonel John Towneley DL (16 February 1806 – 21 February 1878) was a wealthy English Gentleman from an old Roman Catholic, Lancashire family. He entered the United Kingdom parliament for the Whig Party, and later commanded the 5th Royal Lancashire Militia.

He was made deputy lieutenant for Lancashire on 10 May 1834. In 1876, he inherited the family trustee seat at the British Museum.

== Early life ==
Born on 16 February 1806, he was the youngest son of Peregrine Edward Towneley (1762–1846) of Towneley Hall, Burnley and Charlotte Drummond. His eldest sister, Charlotte died, aged 20 in January 1818. Another elder sister, Frances, married Thomas Stonor, 3rd Baron Camoys in 1821, and John would follow his older brother Charles closely. In August 1818, John joined Charles at the Roman Catholic seminary at St Mary's College, Oscott, studying there until Christmas 1824.

== Career ==
=== Politics ===
He was elected at the 1841 general election as a Member of Parliament (MP) for Beverley, and held the seat until he did not stand at the 1852 general election.

=== Military ===
When his brother Charles Towneley, raised the new 5th Royal Lancashire Militia in 1853, John was commissioned as one of the Captains. He was promoted to Major a few weeks later. The auxiliary regiment was already embodied when war was declared against Russia, on 28 March the following year, beginning the Crimean War. In May 1855 they began duty at Aldershot and moved to Clonmel, Ireland at the start of December. From mid-April 1856, the regiment spent a month in Dublin, before returning to Burnley to be disembodied on 6 June. When Charles retired from the command in 1863, John was promoted to lieutenant-colonel to succeed him. He also succeeded Charles as honorary colonel of the regiment following Charles's death in 1876.

== Personal life ==
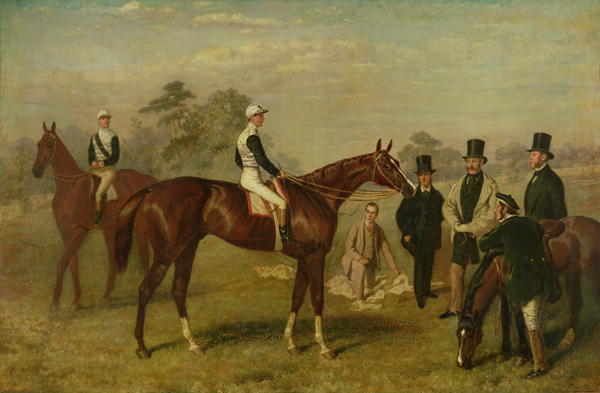
Kettledrum by Harry Hall. The painting depicts the 1861 Epsom Derby-winning horse and jockey Ralph Bullock, being presented to the Towneley brothers and Richard Eastwood, along with young Richard Towneley and the trainer, George Oates.

Towneley married Lucy Ellen Tichborne (1818–1900), the daughter of Henry Joseph Tichborne, (the 8th Baronet) and Anne Burke on 28 October 1840. They had five children:

- Theresa Harriet (1843-1926) married John Delacour in 1890. She died 23 September 1926.
- Lucy Evelyn (died 1928) married Colonel John Murray, 23rd Laird of Touchadam, chief of the Clan Murray in 1877. She died 19 June 1928.
- Mary Elizabeth (1846-1922) became a nun and Provincial of the English Province of the Sisters of Notre Dame de Namur. She died 31 March 1922.
- Richard Henry (1849-1877).
- Mabel Anne (1854-1921) married Lewis Henry Hugh Clifford, 9th Baron Clifford of Chudleigh in 1890. She died 24 January 1921.

Although three of Towneley's daughters married, no children were produced from any of these marriages. His widow died in London on 8 April 1900.

He kept a townhouse on Eaton Place off Eaton Square in the Belgravia area of London. In 1860 he was a member of the Travellers and White's Gentlemen's clubs.

Towneley Estates Act 1885
- Act of Parliament
- Parliament of the United Kingdom
- Long title: An Act for carrying into effect the Division of certain Hereditaments known as the Towneley Estate, in the Counties of Lancaster and York; the Estate in the Forest of Bowland, in the same Counties; and the Stella and Stanley Estates, in the County of Durham, and for other purposes.
- Citation: 48 & 49 Vict. c. 5 Pr.

Dates
- Royal assent: 6 August 1885

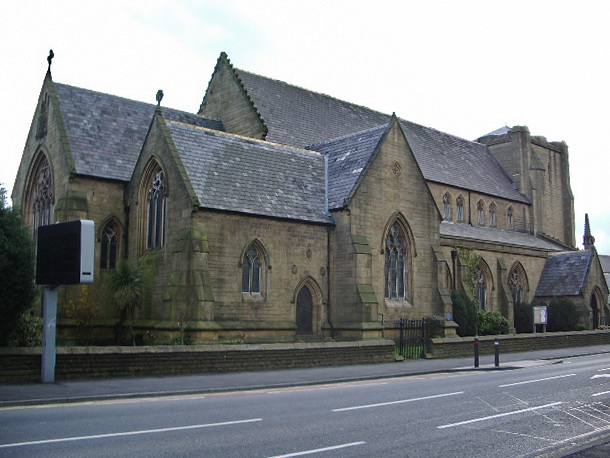
St Mary's Church in Burnley, showing the Towneley Chapel extension.

John also inherited the Towneley estates, including the Lordship of Bowland, in 1876 from his brother Charles. As John's only son Richard died before he did, it became necessary to divide the estate between the seven daughters of the two men, requiring a private act of Parliament, the Towneley Estates Act 1885 (48 & 49 Vict. c. 5 Pr.)

== Memorial ==
The Towneley Chapel was added to the church of St Mary of the Assumption, Burnley, as a memorial to John and his son Richard. It was dedicated to Our Lady of the Angels, which seems to relate to Towneley’s daughter Mary, who had taken the name ‘Sister Marie des Saints Anges’ when she became a nun. It was officially opened on 5 October 1879.

Parliament of the United Kingdom
Preceded by Sackville Lane-Fox; Sir James Hogg, Bt	Member of Parliament for Beverley; 1841–1852; With: Sir James Hogg, Bt 1841–1847; Sackville Lane-Fox 1847–1852	Succeeded by Hon. Francis Charles Lawley; William Wells
