= Edward Glover (politician) =

Irish Independent Conservative politician and barrister

Edward Auchmuty Glover

Member of Parliament for Beverley
- In office 28 March 1857 – 9 August 1857 Serving with William Denison
- Preceded by: Arthur Hamilton-Gordon; William Wells
- Succeeded by: Henry Edwards; William Denison

Personal details
- Born: c. 1816
- Died: 17 March 1862
- Party: Independent Conservative
- Other political affiliations: Radical
- Parent(s): James Glover; Ellen Power

Edward Auchmuty Glover (c. 1816 – 17 March 1862) was an Irish Independent Conservative politician and barrister.

The eldest son of James Glover and Ellen Power, Glover was a practising barrister and a Justice of the Peace.

Although he contested the 1852 general election as an Independent Conservative, Glover was only elected an Independent Conservative MP for Beverley at the 1857 general election. His political views were, however, more complex, as between the two elections he had contested at several places, "professing any political creed that might happen to favour his success". Indeed, while he contested Canterbury as a Radical at a by-election in 1854, when he contested Beverley again in 1857, he stood as a Conservative despite losing the support of the local party. He then held the seat for just a few months.

In August 1857, Glover was unseated after an Election Petition Committee found that he did not meet the required property qualification–owning property worth £300 a year for a borough seat–at the time of his election, meaning he was not entitled to be elected an MP. However, he had previously declared he met the qualification requirements—these properties he had no interest in.

After his case was referred to the Attorney-General, Glover was arrested on 23 December 1857, and he was later found guilty, by the Old Bailey of making a false declaration regarding this qualification. In April 1858, he was sentenced to four months in Newgate Prison, and transferred to the Queen's Bench Prison. The property qualification was later that year abolished.

Glover again contested the seat at the 1859 general election, as an independent candidate, but was unsuccessful, ending votes last in the poll.

Parliament of the United Kingdom
Preceded by Arthur Hamilton-Gordon; William Wells	Member of Parliament for Beverley; March 1857 – August 1857; With: William Denison	Succeeded by Henry Edwards; William Denison
