= Francis Charles Lawley =

British journalist and politician

Francis Charles Lawley (24 May 1825 – 18 September 1901) was a British journalist and Liberal Party politician.

He was the youngest son of Paul Thompson, 1st Baron Wenlock, and after schooling in Hatfield attended Rugby School in May 1837. In 1848 he graduated from Balliol College, Oxford with a second-class honours degree in Literae Humaniores. He entered Inner Temple as a student in 1847, but failed to be called to the bar, instead gaining a BCL. In 1852 he was elected as a member of parliament (MP) for Beverley, and also became private secretary to William Ewart Gladstone during his time as the Chancellor of the Exchequer in the same year.

In June 1854 he was considered for the position of Governor of South Australia, but was swiftly discounted after a political scandal forced him to resign from office. He was known for his passion for horse-racing and gambling, and this had financially damaged him. It was revealed in August 1854 that to recoup his lost funds he had been using insider information gained from his position within the Exchequer to speculate on Funds. After this came out he was forced to resign from his position as a Member of Parliament, and also as Gladstone's secretary. Ironically despite the information involved he failed to gain any amount of money; Lord Henry Lennox remarked that "Lawley's greatest sin was to lose on the funds, knowing what he did".

With his career in ruins he moved to the United States in 1856, becoming a correspondent for The Times covering the American Civil War with the Confederate Army, and authored several books including The Bench and the Jockey Club and The Life and Times of the Druid, as well as contributing to magazines such as St Paul's Magazine. In 1865 he returned to London and wrote for The Daily Telegraph. He continued to have financial problems, beginning bankruptcy proceedings in 1874 and 1881, and proceedings against his estate continued after his death.

Parliament of the United Kingdom
Preceded by Sackville Lane-Fox; John Towneley	Member of Parliament for Beverley; 1852–1854; With: William Wells	Succeeded by Arthur Hamilton-Gordon; William Wells
