= Hungary–United Kingdom relations =

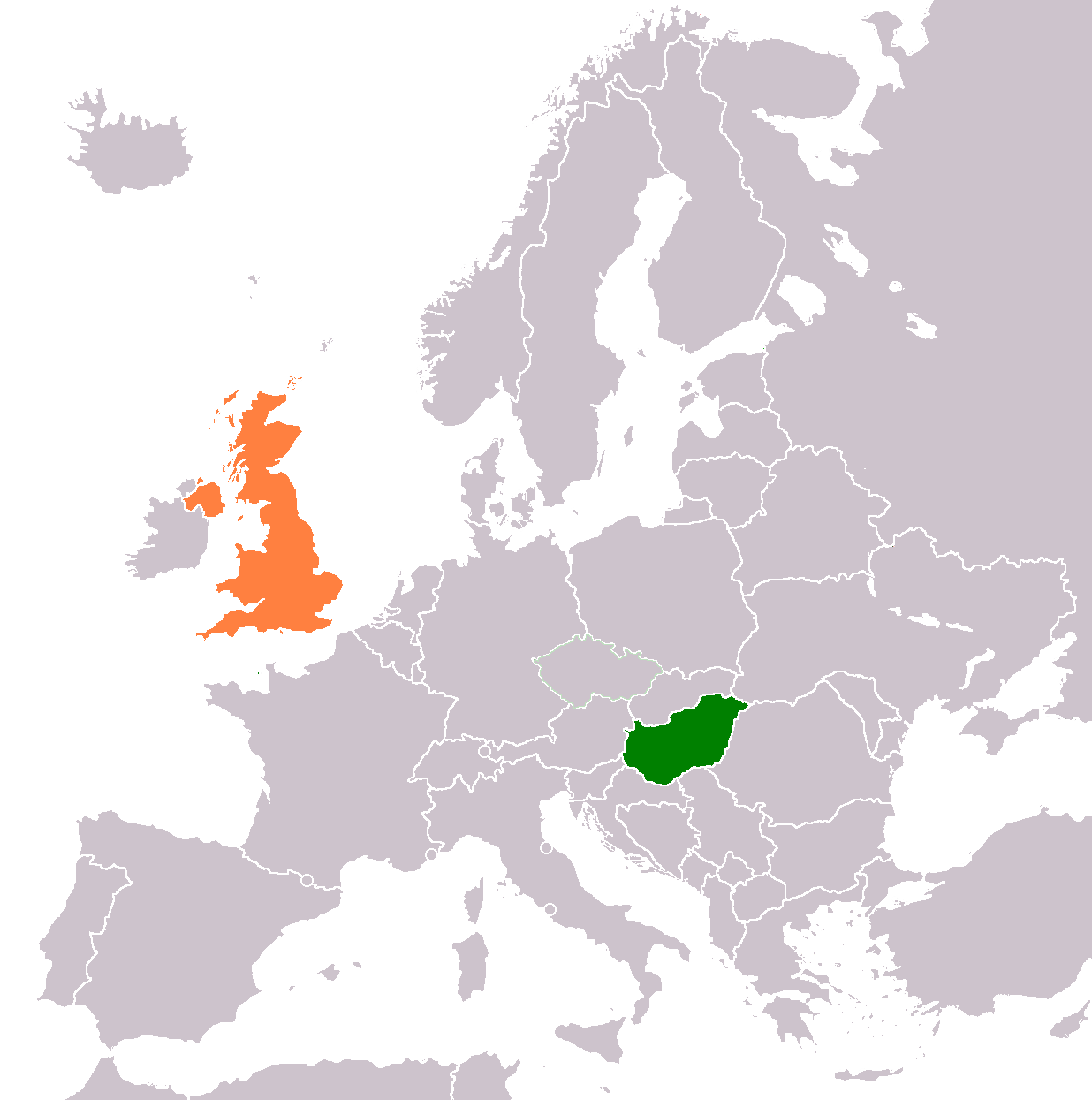

- Hungary: United Kingdom

Diplomatic mission
- Embassy of Hungary, London: Embassy of the United Kingdom, Budapest

Hungary–United Kingdom relations are the foreign relations between Hungary and the United Kingdom. Hungary was a part of the Austrian Empire until 1918 when it became independent. Both countries established diplomatic relations on 22 May 1921.

Both countries share common membership of the Council of Europe, the European Court of Human Rights, the International Criminal Court, NATO, the OECD, the OSCE, and the World Trade Organization. Bilaterally the two countries have a Double Taxation Convention. The United Kingdom gave full support to Hungary's applications for membership in the European Union and NATO.

== History ==
=== 19th century ===
During the early 18th century Hungary was little-known in Britain, and its reputation was negative. That steadily changed as travellers reported on the progress in that distant land. British observers saw Hungary as both a country and a province. However, the Russian invasion of 1849 caused an outpouring of sympathy for Hungary as a victim. By 1900 British observers saw Hungary as an integral part of the Austro-Hungarian empire.

From 1848 to 1914 the status of Hungary played a minor role in British diplomacy. London's main goal was the peaceful maintenance of the balance of power. It called for a satisfied and stable Hungary to counterbalance Russia and the Slavs residing within the Habsburg Empire. British sympathies toward Hungary did not extend to the recognition of Hungarian independence from Habsburg rule. The Hungarian Revolution of 1848 under Lajos Kossuth gained strong support across Britain in 1848–1851. However, Kossuth's calls for independence from the Austrian Empire did not become British policy. Foreign Secretary Lord Palmerston told Parliament the Britain would consider it a great misfortune to Europe if Hungary became independent. He argued that a united Austrian Empire was a European necessity and a natural ally of Britain. Liberal reformers in Hungary closely watched Britain as a model for the sort of parliamentary government they were seeking. They were especially attracted to the British free-trade movement. They outwitted reactionary censorship. Under the pretext of criticizing British conditions, they agitated in favour of a change in feudal Hungary.

=== 20th century ===
In 1924 the Bank of England reached agreement with the Royal Hungarian Note Institution. Britain financed Hungary's reconstruction and re-entry into European commerce. This represented a major expansion of the foreign relations of both nations, and was part of a British effort to forestall inroads into Europe from New York banks.

During WWII, UK didn't declare war on Hungary until 5 December 1941.

On 2–4 February 1984, Prime Minister Margaret Thatcher visited Hungary, in her first official visit to the Eastern Bloc. She met with Prime Minister György Lázár and First Secretary János Kádár. She also laid a wreath at Hősök tere and the Commonwealth War Cemetery in Solymár.

== Resident diplomatic missions ==
=== Embassy of the United Kingdom, Budapest ===
The Embassy of the United Kingdom in Budapest is the chief diplomatic mission of the United Kingdom in Hungary.

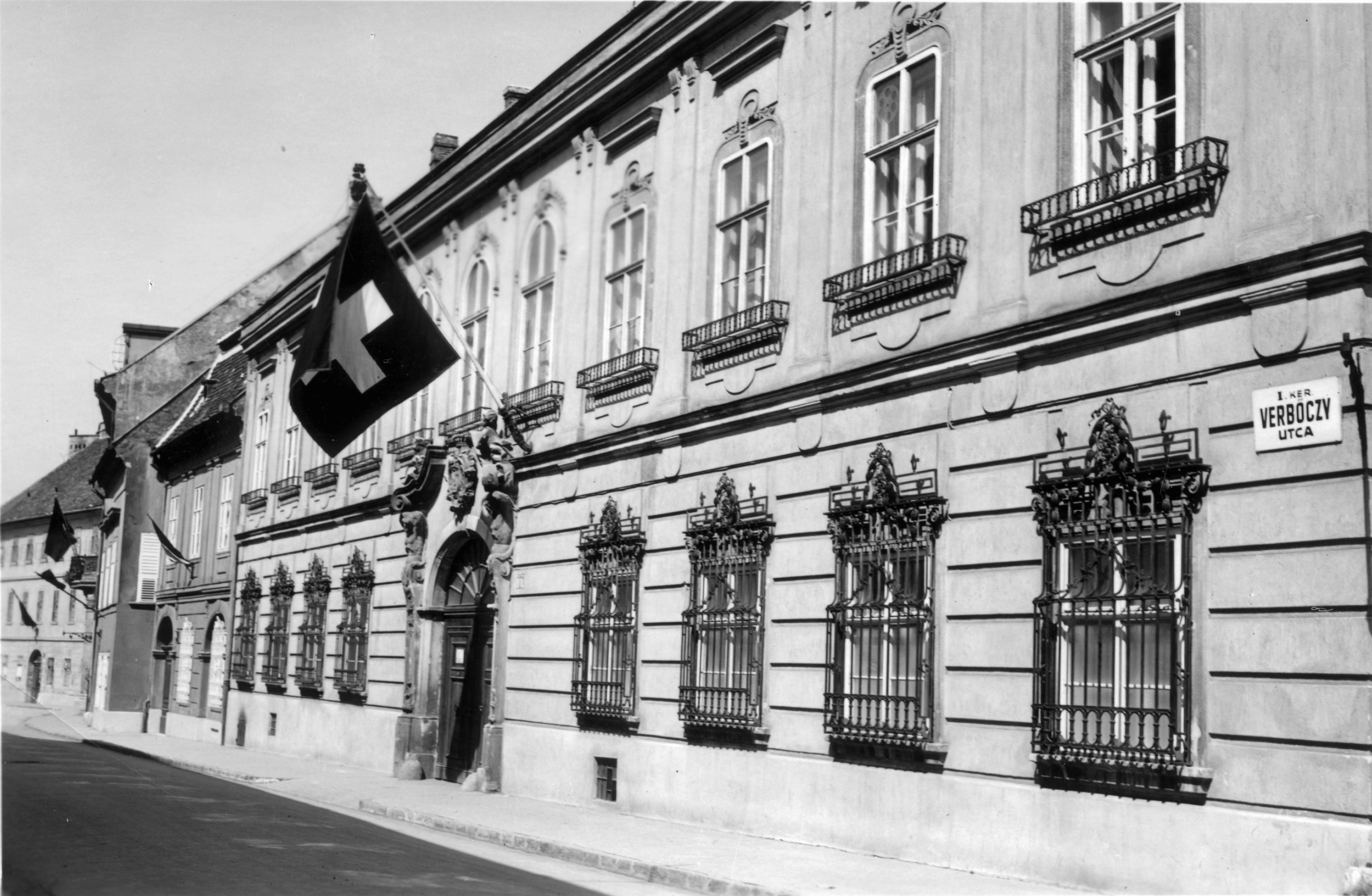
British Embassy in Hungary under Swiss protection during World War II.

From 1922 up until the Second World War, the British Embassy in Budapest was located at Táncsics utca 1 in the Castle District of the city. It operated for just two decades, until Hungary entered the Second World War, at which time the British left and the Swiss took their place, since the interests of enemy countries were represented by neutral Switzerland. Between 1942 and 1945, Swiss Vice-Consul Carl Lutz worked in the British Embassy building. Lutz was the Swiss consul general who saved tens of thousands of Jews during the Holocaust, which has been commemorated by a plaque on the facade since 2012. The building suffered serious damage during the siege of Budapest. It remained in ruins for decades, at the beginning of the 1960s, the British submitted a plan for its complete modernization, but this was rejected by the National Monuments Authority, so it was sold to the Hungarian state in 1967, which renovated it into the office's headquarters in the following years.

In the 1960s, the British embassy was located on Harmincad utca in a building which was originally constructed in Secessionist style by the Hungarian builder Károly Reiner to be the headquarters of Hazai Bank. Following the German occupation of Hungary in 1944, Swedish consul Raoul Wallenberg rented space in this bank and declared it as an official Swedish consulate that could not be entered by Nazi authorities, to eventually shelter many Hungarian Jews. A plaque on the building’s corner commemorates Wallenberg’s deeds.

In April 2017, the British Embassy moved out of its building in Harmincad utca after 70 years, into an office building at 5-7 Füge utca in the Rózsadomb (District II) district of Budapest. The new embassy building previously served as the home to the Dutch Embassy to Hungary. Minister for Europe Sir Alan Duncan and Hungarian Minister for Foreign Affairs Péter Szijjártós officially opened the new Embassy building. In March 2020, at the height of the Coronavirus pandemic, Steven Dick, the deputy head of mission at the British embassy in Budapest died from COVID-19.

The embassy also represents the British Overseas Territories in Hungary.

The current British Ambassador to Hungary is Justin McKenzie Smith.

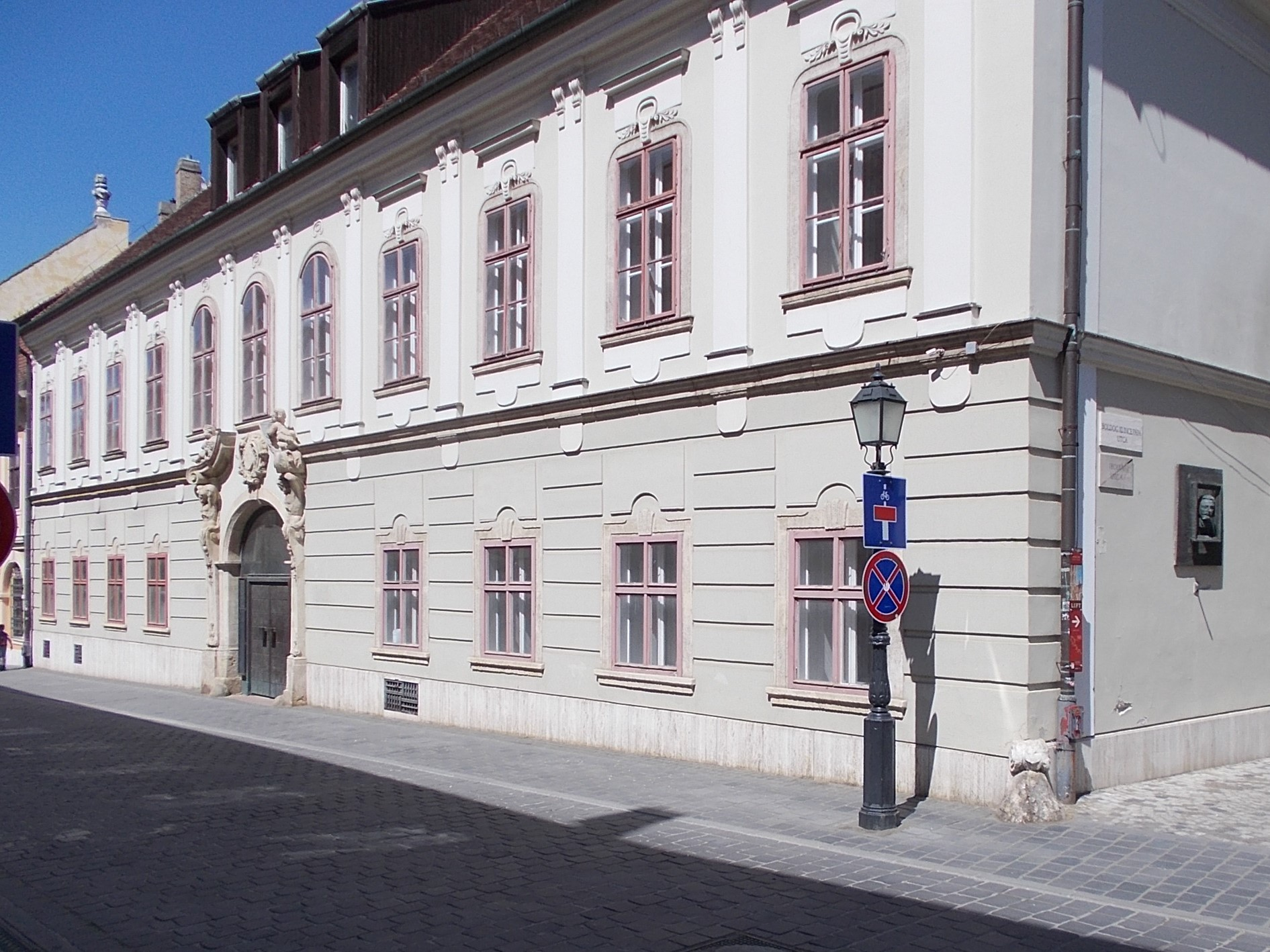
British Embassy, Budapest (1922-1939)

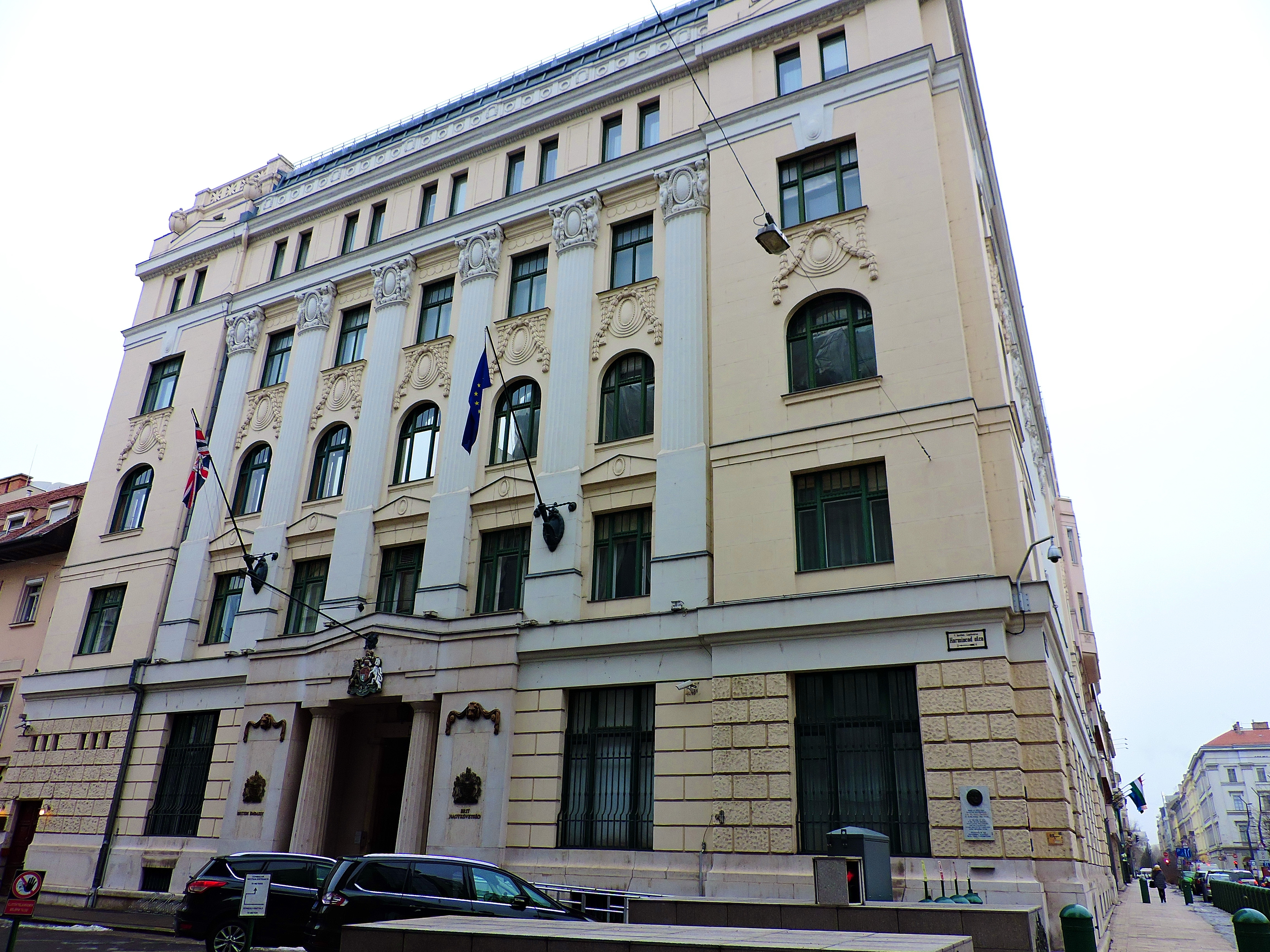
British Embassy, Budapest (1948-2017)

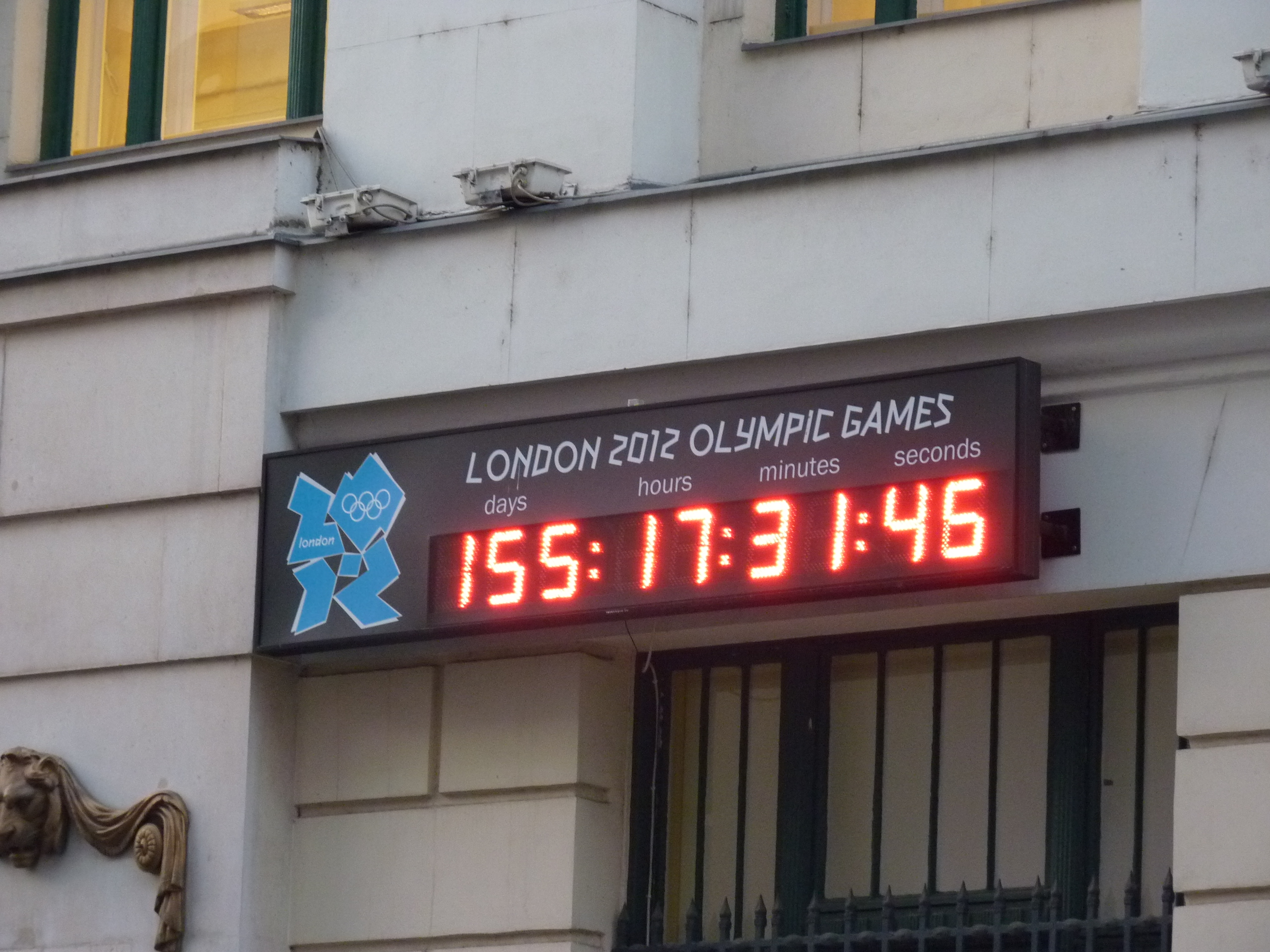
A countdown to the 2012 London Olympics, outside the Embassy

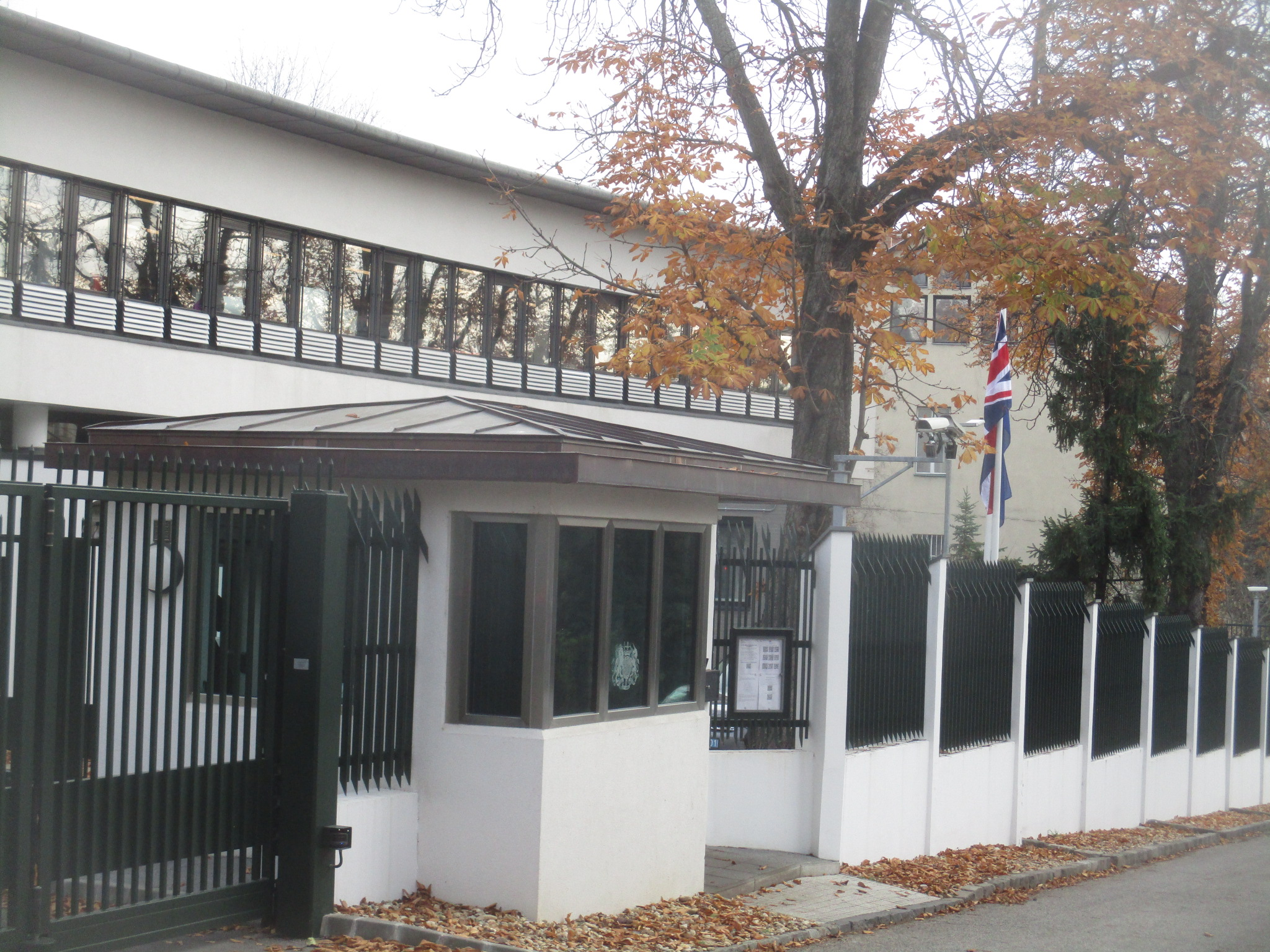
British Embassy, Budapest (2017–present)

=== Embassy of Hungary, London ===
The Embassy of Hungary in London is the diplomatic mission of Hungary in the United Kingdom. Opposite the embassy itself can be found the Hungarian Economic, Investment & Trade Commission and the Hungarian National Tourist Office at 46 Eaton Place. A Hungarian Cultural Centre is also maintained at 10 Maiden Lane in Covent Garden. The consular section of the embassy is located at 100 Brompton Road. In addition, Hungary has a consulate-general in Manchester, Cardiff and Edinburgh.

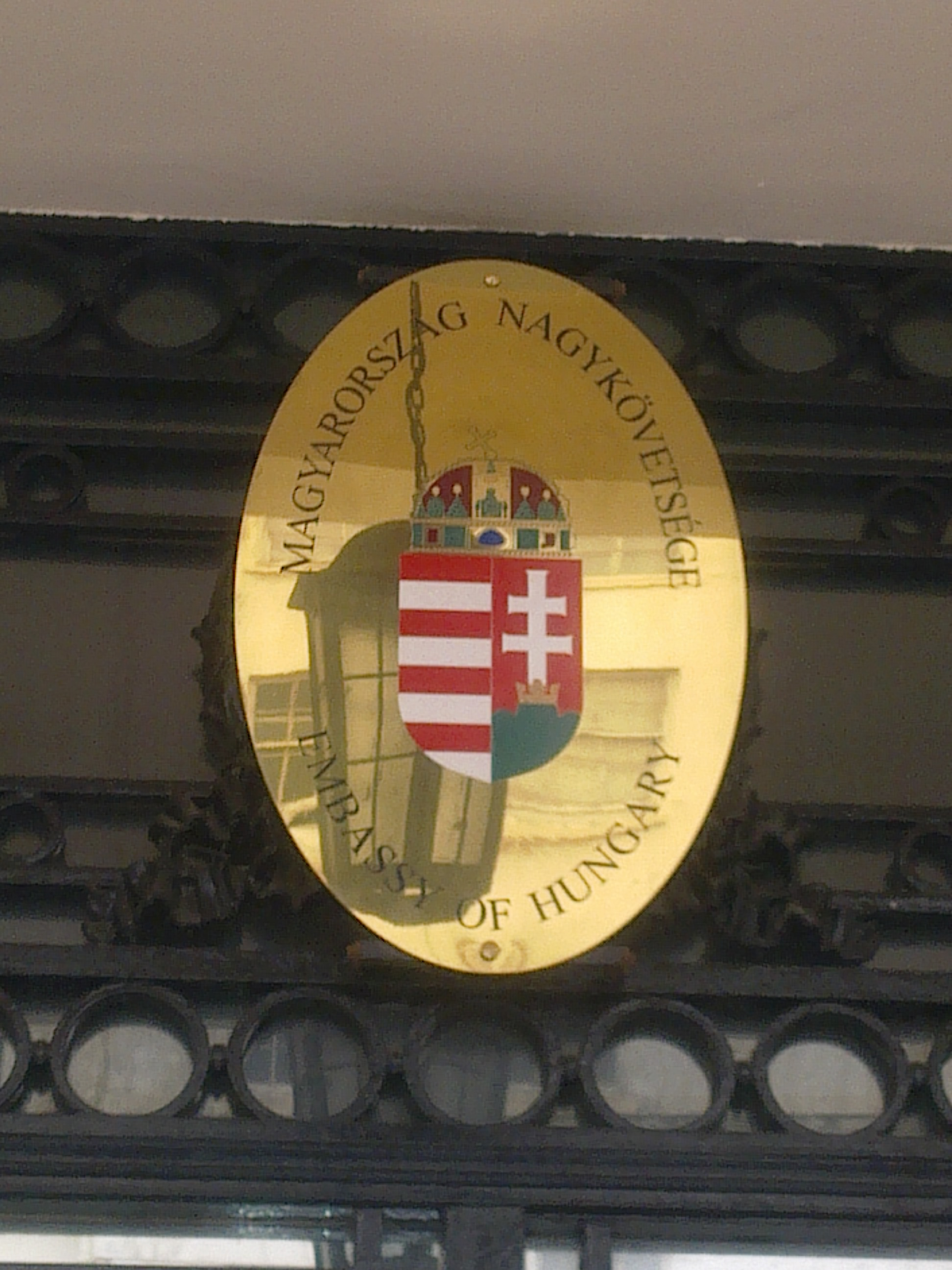
Plaque above the entrance depicting the Coat of arms of Hungary

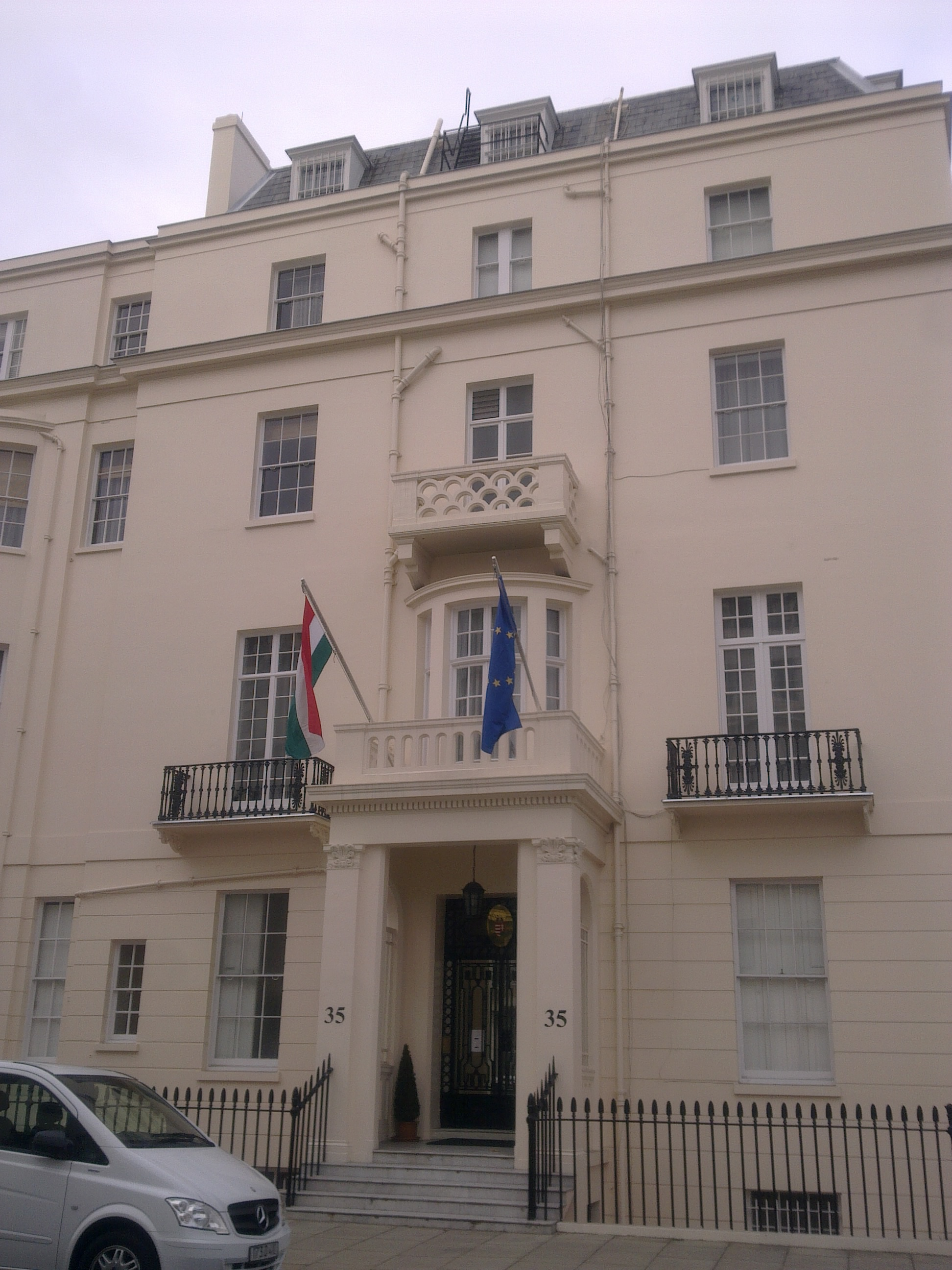
Embassy of Hungary, London

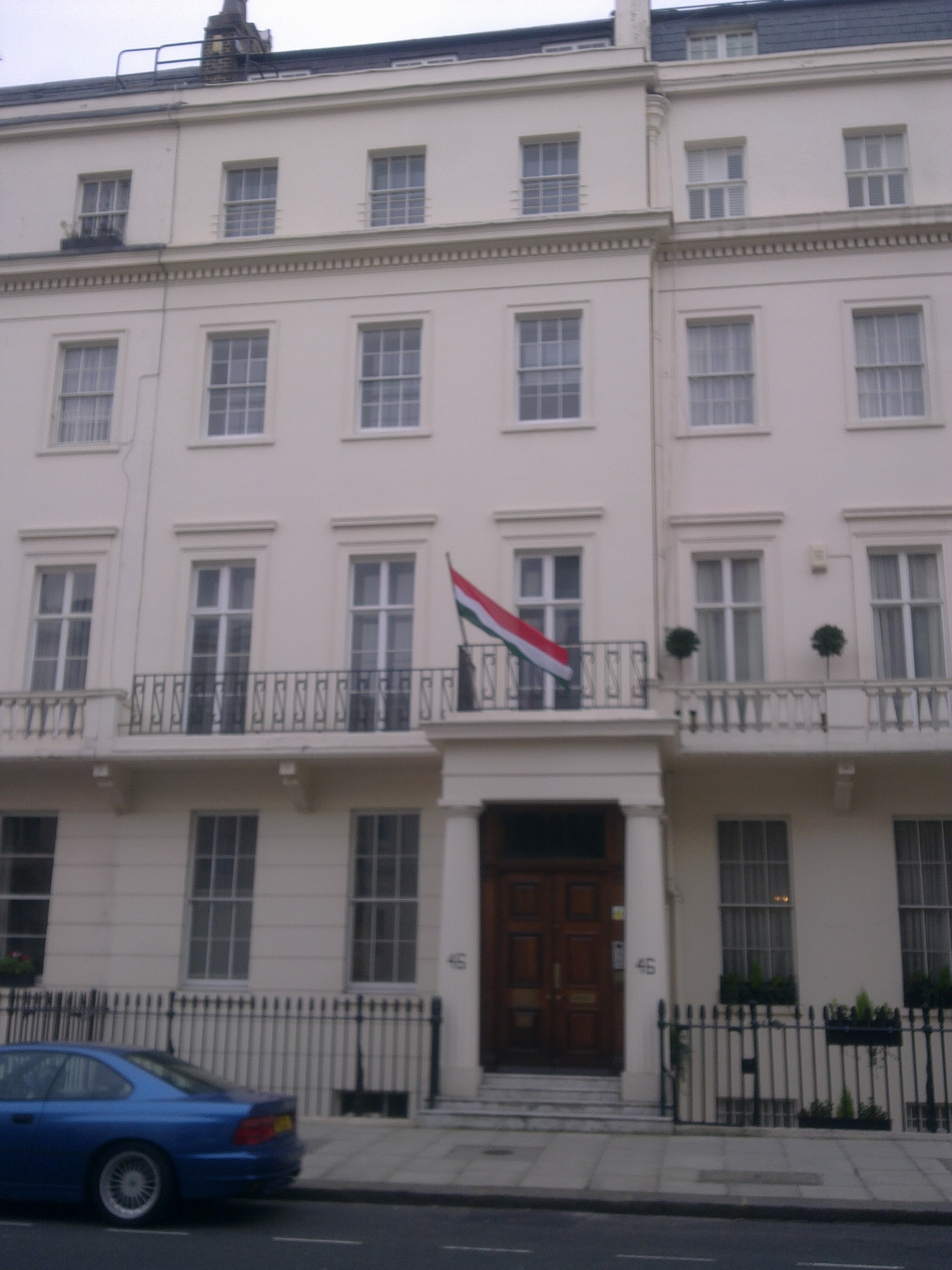
46 Eaton Place

== See also ==
- Foreign relations of Hungary
- Foreign relations of the United Kingdom
- United Kingdom–European Union relations
- Hungarian migration to the United Kingdom
