= Robert Hall (MP for Beverley) =

16th-century English politician

Robert Hall (fl. 1563) was an English politician.

He was a Member (MP) of the Parliament of England for Beverley in 1563.

Parliament of England
Preceded by ? ?	Member of Parliament for Beverley; 1563; With: Nicholas Bacon	Succeeded by Edward Ellerker; Thomas Leyton
