= Edwards baronets of Treforis (1921) =

Escutcheon of the Edwards baronets of Treforis

The Edwards baronetcy, of Treforis in the County of Glamorgan, was created in the Baronetage of the United Kingdom on 30 June 1921 for John Bryn Edwards. The title became extinct on the death of his only son, the 2nd Baronet, in 1999.

== Edwards baronets, of Treforis (1921) ==
- Sir John Bryn Edwards, 1st Baronet (1889–1922)
- Sir John Clive Leighton Edwards, 2nd Baronet (1916–1999)
