= William Belt =

English barrister and antiquarian (1826–1892)

William John Belt
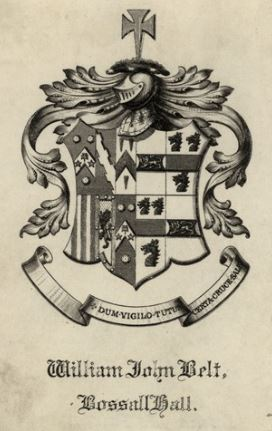
- Born: 12 June 1826; Bloomsbury, London
- Died: 3 February 1892 (aged 65)
- Resting place: Highgate Cemetery
- Occupation: Barrister

William John Belt (1826–1892) was an English barrister (courtroom lawyer) and antiquarian best known for his erratic behaviour in later life which was widely reported by popular newspapers for the amusement of their readers.

== Early life ==
Belt was born on 12 June 1826 at 40 Great Ormond Street, Bloomsbury, the fifth son of Robert Belt, a barrister and commissioner of bankruptcy of Bossall Hall, in Yorkshire, and his second wife, Margaret Gordon (1785–1872), daughter of Captain Peter Gordon, a naval officer in the service of the East India Company. He had an elder sister, Margaret Ann, and a younger sister, Elizabeth. Their father died in December 1839.

Belt matriculated at Trinity College, Cambridge, in 1847, aged 21, graduated BA in 1851, and proceeded to MA in 1855. He was admitted to Lincoln's Inn on 29 April 1858 and called to the bar in 1861. Belt also joined a volunteer corps of Inns of Court troops that had been formed during the Crimean War, the 23rd Middlesex Rifles, also known as The Devil's Own.

On 28 November 1865 in Hove, Sussex he married Sibella Marianne Garratt (6 November 1825 – 15 February 1878) the only daughter of Sibella and William Garratt, a retired barrister also of Lincoln's Inn.

== Belt and the police ==
Bloomsbury's proximity to Inns of Court had made it a popular district for lawyers and their families to live since it was first laid out for housing in the 18th century, largely by Wriothesley Russell, 3rd Duke of Bedford. But by 1869 when the Belts moved to 102 Gower Street, Bloomsbury it was no longer a fashionable suburb of London. This was to become all too clear when four years later, in 1873, Belt had his first run-in with the police when walking to his chambers in Stone's Buildings, Chancery Lane, a 25-minute walk.

His story, is that on 27 October he had enjoyed lunch at home with his wife, and during the walk to his office he had passed two young girls playing with a skipping rope. He gave one of them a two penny piece, and offered the other a sixpence to buy sweets, but she was shy and ran away. Seeing them again a little further on he persuaded the other girl to accept the sixpence, whereupon he said to them "I hope you may always be as happy as you are today." A little further on he was laughed at and jostled by two men, who claimed he was drunk and threatened to "thrash" him. Belt found a policeman nearby and pointed out the men, asking for protection and their names be taken, only to be accused by the constable of "being drunk and causing an obstruction". Belt replied that he was a barrister and continued his walk to work, but was followed by the policeman and a crowd of 20 or 30 boys all shouting that he was drunk. The policeman finally decided to arrest him, as one boy shouted out "that's right, take away the nasty fellow, I saw him inveigling some children". Protesting, Belt was marched off to Hunter Street Police Station where he was held for three hours before a charge of being drunk and disorderly was made. The following day a magistrate dismissed the charge without even calling Belt as a witness. He complained about his treatment to the Home Secretary which resulted in an inquiry into the police officer's conduct at Bow Street Police Court.

Belt's wife Sibella died at Gower Street in 1878, a loss which may account for his next brush with the law the following year. On a Saturday evening in May 1879 two police constables were patrolling the Albert Embankment when they heard, and then saw, a horse and rider approaching. The man was smartly dressed but seemed to be swaying in the saddle as if a little the worse for drink so they decided to keep an eye on him. They followed him into a dimly lit street and saw that he was throwing silver coins to a large crowd of dustmen and small boys which had gathered around him. Concerned for his safety, the officers moved in through the throng and one constable firmly advised the rider to desist and go home. Instead of obeying his request Belt growled at him "You are one of Colonel Henderson's ruffians, I should like to have a turn with him in Belgium, choose our own weapons, and stand six yards apart" (Sir Edmund Henderson was commissioner of the Metropolitan Police from 1869 to 1886). Clearly Belt's earlier experience with the police, combined with the effects of alcohol, suggested he was spoiling for a fight (since six yards was the classic duelling distance), and when he proceed to hit one of the policemen over the head with his riding whip, all doubt of his belligerence towards the police was dispelled. He was cheered by the assembled dustmen, but the two policemen grabbed the reins of the horse and pulled him away. With difficulty, and with Belt refusing to dismount, the two constables escorted their captive to a police station and charged him with being drunk and with assaulting a police officer. Belt gave his name, address and occupation (barrister) and appeared in court at Lambeth before the magistrate, Mr Chance, where he denied everything.

He said he had been riding on the Embankment to meet up with his old regiment, The Devil's Own, at Wimbledon. He was not drunk he said, but ill. He had nothing more than "two spoonsful of brandy" that day and despite the fact that he was riding without the use of his stirrups, he was entirely in control of his horse. Medical evidence was heard which supported both his and the police's claim about his being inebriated that night, so it was left to the magistrate to decide the outcome. Mr Chance was pretty clear an assault had taken place, and sure that the police were justified in trying to remove the barrister from a tricky situation where he might have been the victim of crime. But in part because the man had managed to ride so far without the use of his stirrups and because he was a gentleman, he dismissed the charge of drunkenness. Belt was ordered to pay a fine of £3, which he did, and was discharged.

In 1886 Belt was back in Bow Street Police Court, on the wrong side of the dock, charged with assault with a gun. A builder, William Wheeler, had been at work on building in Gower Mews, behind Belt's house in Gower Street. Also in the Mews was a boy and a man called Edward Ingram. Belt was seen at one of his back windows with something like a gun in his hand, which he put to his shoulder. A click was heard, and Wheeler felt something on his leg, but no hole was made in his trousers. He picked up a pellet and was showing it to Ingram, when Belt again pointed the gun, another click was heard, and Ingram was struck on the waistcoat. Belt admitted firing the gun, but asserted that the boy had aggravated him. Since the incident it was ascertained that the gun was not as dangerous a weapon as was at first supposed, but an air gun which Belt said he kept for shooting cats. The magistrate ordered Belt to pay in each case a fine of £4 and £1 costs, making a total of £10.

== Interests ==
Belt was a Fellow of the Society of Antiquaries of London and in 1880 became a member of the Society of Biblical Archaeology.

After the death of his wife in 1878, Belt wrote two short books, Reminiscences, 1854. Rome, Latium, Etruria, published in 1883, in verse about his earlier experiences in Rome and two years later published The Story of Bossall Hall and Manor.

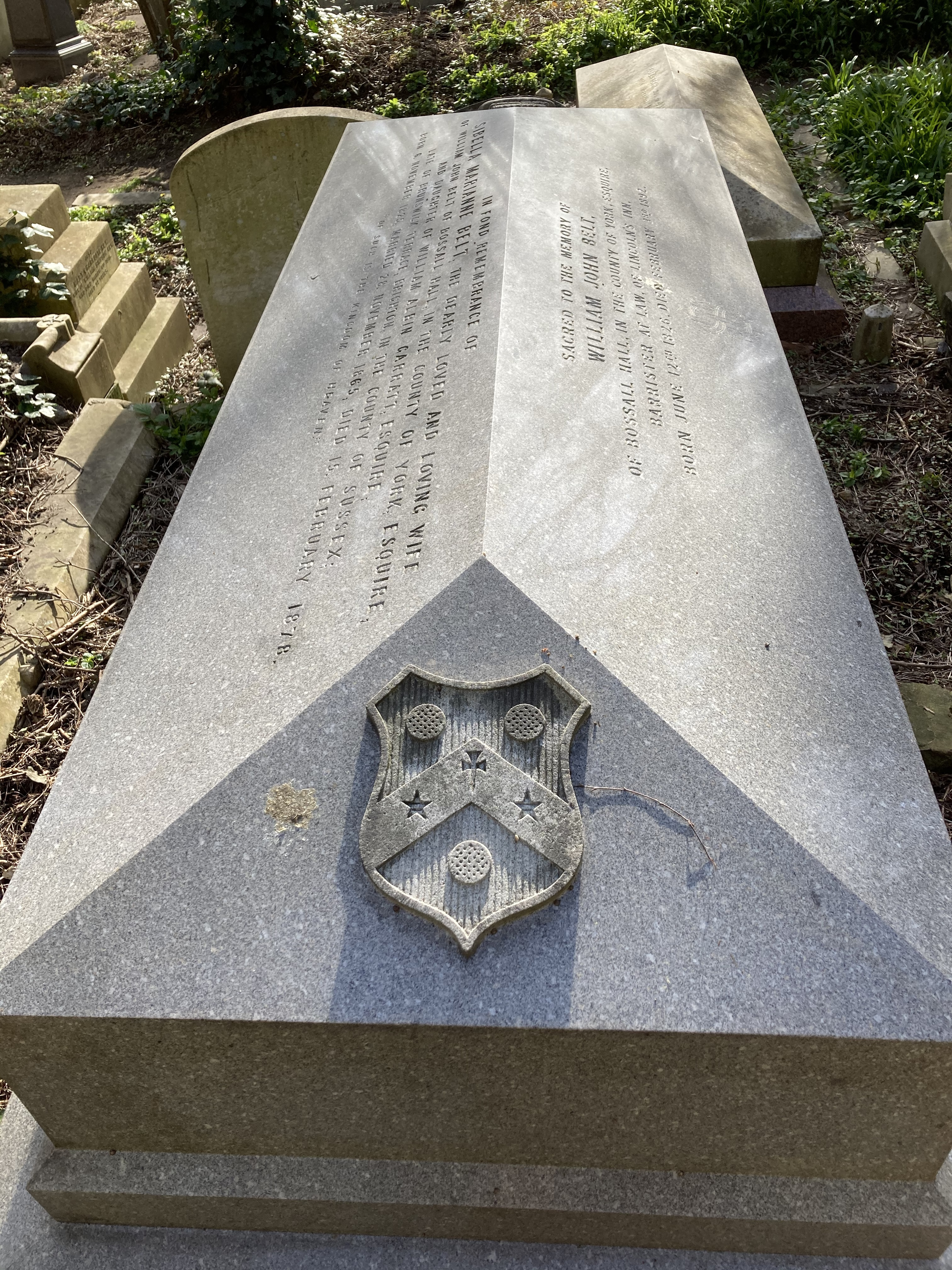
Belt's grave in Highgate Cemetery

== Later life ==
The directory Men-at-the-bar said of Belt in 1885 that he was an equity draftsman and conveyancer.

Belt was always proud of his manor in Yorkshire, but by 1890 the family may have been in financial difficulties, because Bossall Hall was sold to Sir James Walker, 2nd Baronet of Sand Hutton.

Belt died at 102 Gower Street two years later on 3 February 1892 and was buried on the west side of Highgate Cemetery. He left the modest sum of £1,334, equivalent to £183,241 in 2023, and probate was granted to his elder sister Margaret Ann, wife of the Reverend Bury Capel.

== Bibliography ==
Belt, William John (1883). Reminiscences, 1854. Rome, Latium, Etruria. [In verse.] York: J Sampson.

Belt, William John (1885). The Story of Bossall Hall and Manor With Supplement from Early Chronicles. York: John Sampson.
