= Sir James Walker, 2nd Baronet =

British Conservative politician

Sir James Robert Walker, 2nd Baronet, of Sand Hutton JP, DL (19 October 1829 – 12 June 1899) was a British Conservative politician.

He was the son of James Walker, 1st Baronet, and his first wife Mary Denison. Walker was educated at Christ Church, Oxford and graduated with a Bachelor of Arts in 1851 and a Master of Arts in 1860. In 1883, he succeeded his father as baronet.

Walker, who had served with the Yorkshire Hussars, was a Member of Parliament (MP) for Beverley between 1860 and 1865 and High Sheriff of Yorkshire in 1888. He was a Deputy Lieutenant and justice of the peace of the North Riding as well as a justice of the peace of the East Riding of Yorkshire.

On 23 June 1863, Walker married Louisa Susan Marlborough Heron-Maxwell, third daughter of Captain Sir John Heron-Maxwell, 6th Baronet at St James's Church, Piccadilly. They had nine children. Walker was succeeded in the baronetcy by his oldest son James Heron.

In 1890 he bought Bossall Hall, north of York, from William Belt.

Parliament of the United Kingdom
Preceded by Henry Edwards; Ralph Walters	Member of Parliament for Beverley; 1860 – 1865; With: Henry Edwards	Succeeded by Henry Edwards; Christopher Sykes
Baronetage of the United Kingdom
Preceded by James Walker	Baronet (of Sand Hutton); 1883 – 1899	Succeeded by James Heron Walker
