= Christopher Sykes (politician) =

British politician (1831–1898)

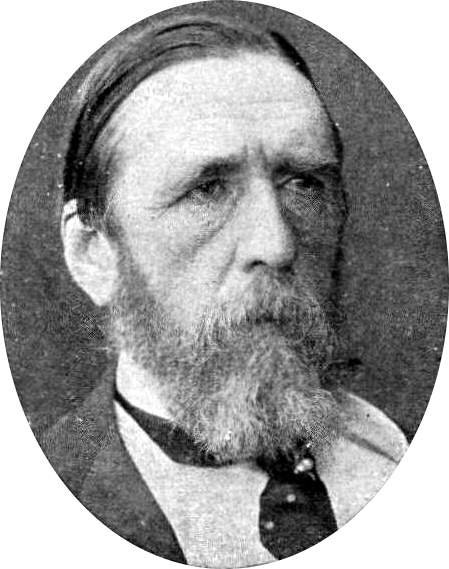
- Photograph of Christopher Sykes
- Born: 10 January 1831
- Died: 15 December 1898 (aged 67)
- Parents: Sir Tatton Sykes, 4th Baronet (father); Mary Anne Foulis (mother)

Christopher Sykes (10 January 1831 – 15 December 1898) was an English Conservative politician who sat in the House of Commons from 1865 to 1892. He enjoyed the "intimate friendship" of Edward VII when Prince of Wales and Alexandra of Denmark when Princess of Wales.

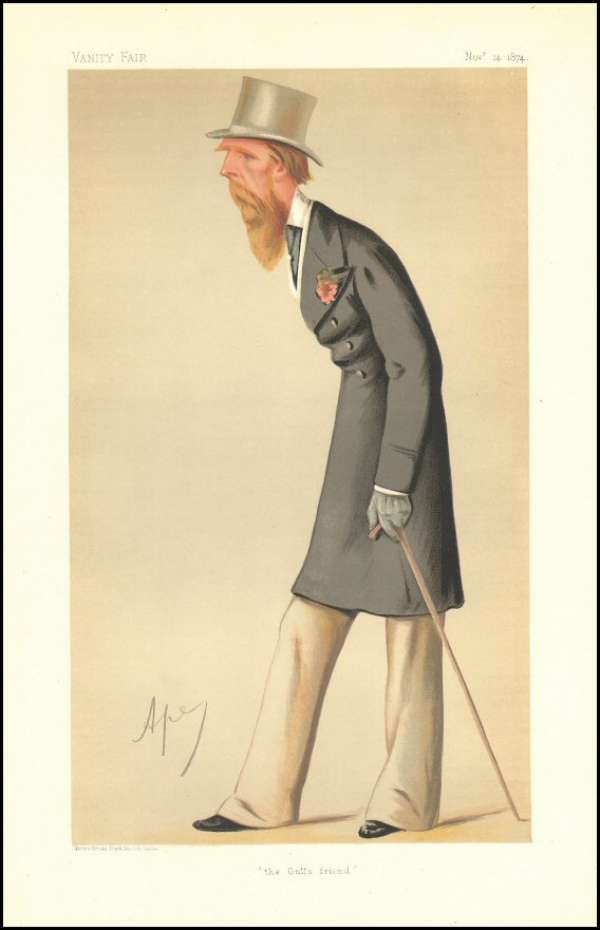
Sykes caricatured by Ape (Carlo Pellegrini) in Vanity Fair, November 1874.

== Early life ==
Sykes was the second son of Sir Tatton Sykes, 4th Baronet, and his wife Mary Ann Foulis, daughter of Sir William Foulis, 7th Baronet. His father was a popular horse breeder who bred bloodstock; however, he was an authoritarian father who bullied his children. Sykes was educated at Rugby School and Trinity College, Cambridge.

== Political career ==
At the 1865 general election Sykes was elected Conservative Member of Parliament (MP) for Beverley. At the 1868 general election he was elected MP for the East Riding of Yorkshire, which he held until 1885, when it was divided under the Redistribution of Seats Act 1885. He was then elected for Buckrose, one of the constituencies into which his previous constituency had been divided, which he held until 1892, when he retired. Between 1868 and 1892, he made only six speeches, and did little except introduce the bill which became the Sea Birds Preservation Act 1869. This led to him being caricatured in Vanity Fair as "The Gull's friend". He was "widely recognised" as "Mr Brancepath" in Lothair, the novel by Benjamin Disraeli. He was honoured with the Order of St Lazarus of Belgium in 1879. He was a Deputy Lieutenant and J.P. for the East Riding of Yorkshire.

== Relationship with Prince of Wales ==
Sykes began mixing with London's great and good and became a connoisseur of books, china and furniture. He became a close friend of Edward VII, then Prince of Wales, who—because of his great height—called Sykes the "Great Xtopher" (pronounced 'Christopher'). Sykes entertained the Prince and Princess Alexandra of Wales in great splendour at Brantingham Thorpe, his country house in Yorkshire, the Doncaster Races, and his London home in Berkeley Square. One night, at the Marlborough Club, the Prince—who hated the vice of drunkenness—poured a glass of brandy over the inebriated Sykes's head; the latter's only response was to bow and say "As your Royal Highness pleases". This performance was repeated subsequently, "dutifully obliged" by the "complicit" Sykes, to the sycophantic appreciation of courtiers present.

However, Sykes's lavish entertainment of the Marlborough House set and the Prince of Wales "dissipated much of his fortune". In the late 1880s he was compelled to take out large loans which led to a long-running dispute with his solicitor and parliamentary agent eventually settled in the Court of Chancery. Brantingham Thorpe was let from 1887. The estate in which he held a life interest reverted on his death to trustees of his father who sold it in 1899 to the then tenant of the house.

Ridley observes of Sykes' near-bankruptcy in attendance on the Prince that "if Sykes was a victim, Bertie was an unwitting oppressor; he had nothing but pity for his old friend, he visited him in London and he wrote to Tatton Sykes imploring him to provide for his brother". Previously, the Prince, having for years stayed with Sykes for the Doncaster races, chose to stay elsewhere in consideration of Sykes's reduced circumstances, saying "I do not wish him ... to spend a farthing on my account—I shall be furious if he gives me a birthday present!" After Sykes' death in 1898, the Prince of Wales installed a tablet to his memory at Westminster Abbey.

Parliament of the United Kingdom
Preceded by Sir Henry Edwards and James Walker	Member of Parliament for Beverley; 1865–1868; With: Harry Edwards	Succeeded by Sir Henry Edwards and Edmund Hegan Kennard
Preceded by Lord Hotham and Arthur Duncombe	Member of Parliament for East Riding of Yorkshire; 1868–1885; With: William Harrison-Broadley	Constituency abolished
New constituency	Member of Parliament for Buckrose; 1885–1886	Succeeded by William Alexander McArthur
Preceded by William Alexander McArthur	Member of Parliament for Buckrose; 1886–1892	Succeeded by Sir Angus Holden
