= William Denison, 1st Earl of Londesborough =

British peer and Liberal politician

The Right Honourable The Earl of Londesborough
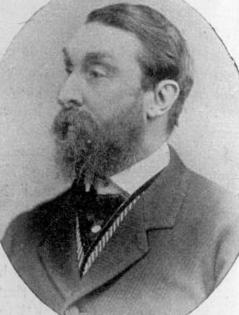

Member of Parliament for Scarborough
- In office 1859–1860 Serving with Sir John Vanden-Bempde-Johnstone
- Preceded by: Sir John Vanden-Bempde-Johnstone; John Dent
- Succeeded by: Sir John Vanden-Bempde-Johnstone; John Dent

Member of Parliament for Beverley
- In office 1857–1859 Serving with Edward Glover (1857); Sir Henry Edwards (1857–1859)
- Preceded by: William Wells; Arthur Hamilton-Gordon
- Succeeded by: Sir Henry Edwards; Ralph Walters

Personal details
- Born: William Henry Forester Conyngham; 19 June 1834 London, England
- Died: 19 April 1900 (aged 65) London, England
- Party: Liberal
- Spouse: Lady Edith Somerset (m. 1863)
- Relations: Henry Conyngham, 1st Marquess Conyngham (grandfather)
- Children: 5
- Parent(s): Albert Denison, 1st Baron Londesborough; Henrietta Mary Weld-Forester

William Henry Forester Denison, 1st Earl of Londesborough (né Conyngham; 19 June 1834 – 19 April 1900), known as The Lord Londesborough from 1860–87, was a British peer and Liberal politician. He was also one of the main founders of Scarborough FC.

== Early life ==
Londesborough was born in 1834, the eldest son and heir of Lord Albert Conyngham, and Hon. Henrietta Mary Weld-Forester. The family moved to Bifrons Park, Patrixbourne, Kent shortly after his birth. In 1849, his father adopted the surname Denison in order to inherit from his maternal uncle William Joseph Denison.

His paternal grandfather was Henry Conyngham, 1st Marquess Conyngham (his father being the fourth son of the Marquess). His mother was the fourth daughter of Cecil Weld-Forester, 1st Baron Forester, and Lady Katharine Mary Manners (second daughter of Charles Manners, 4th Duke of Rutland) Among his siblings was Rear Admiral Albert Denison Somerville Denison.

== Career ==
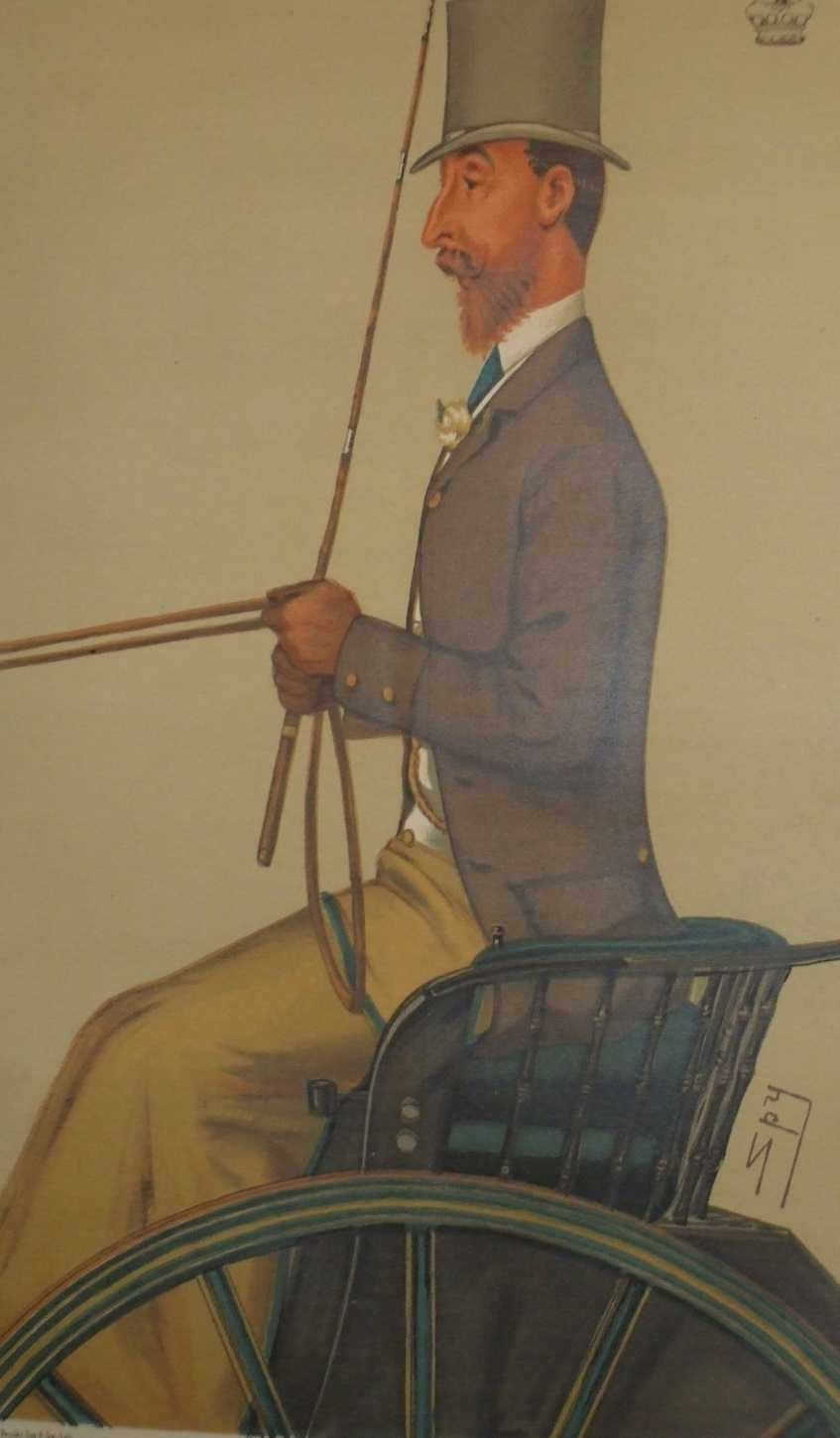
Londesborough as pictured in Vanity Fair, 19 October 1878

He was elected to the House of Commons for Beverley in 1857, a seat he held until 1859, and then represented Scarborough from 1859 to 1860 when he succeeded his father in the barony and entered the House of Lords.

Londesborough was the first President of the British Goat Society, established in 1869, and was also Worshipful Master of the Constitutional Lodge No. 294 in Beverley.

In 1871, Londesborough entertained the Prince of Wales at his villa Londesborough Lodge at Scarborough. In 1887, he was created Viscount Raincliffe, of Raincliffe in the North Riding of the County of York, and Earl of Londesborough, in the County of York. He was appointed Honorary Colonel of the 4th East Riding Artillery Volunteer Corps on 11 August 1860 and of the 1st Yorkshire (East Riding) Rifle Volunteer Corps (later 1st Volunteer Battalion, East Yorkshire Regiment) on 24 April 1862. The Volunteers' drill hall in Hull was named Londesborough Barracks in his honour. On 9 September 1893 he transferred from the 1st Battalion to become Honorary Colonel of the 2nd Volunteer Battalion, East Yorkshire Regiment.

The 'Londesborough Theatre' (1871-1960) was named in his honour. Both Raincliffe Woods, and the former Raincliffe School, were also named after the title bestowed on him in 1887.

== Personal life ==
In 1863, Lord Londesborough married Lady Edith Frances Wilhelmina Somerset, a daughter of Henry Somerset, 7th Duke of Beaufort. Together, they were the parents of:

- William Henry Francis Denison, 2nd Earl of Londesborough (1864–1917), who married Lady Grace Adelaide Fane (1860–1933), eldest daughter of Francis Fane, 12th Earl of Westmorland.
- Lady Edith Henrietta Sybil Denison (d. 1945) married her half-cousin Sir Gerald Codrington, 1st Baronet of Dodington Park (1850-1929), son of Sir Christopher William Codrington.
- Lady Lilian Katharine Selina Denison (d. 1899), who married Newton Charles Ogle of Kirkley (d. 1912).
- Lady Ida Emily Augusta Denison (d. 1937), married Sir George Sitwell, becoming the mother of the three Sitwells, a close-knit trio of authors and social stylists of the 1920s. Lady Ida was an orchid enthusiast and she is commemorated in the scientific name of the orchid Vanda denisoniana.
- Lady Mildred Adelaide Cecilia Denison (d. 1953), who married Sir William Wemyss Cooke, 10th Baronet in 1902. They divorced in 1925.

Lord Londesborough died in April 1900, aged 65, and was succeeded in his titles by his son William. His widow, Lady Londesborough, died in 1915.

== Arms ==
Arms

Londesborough's arms are blazoned Ermine, a bend azure cotised sable between a unicorn's head erased in chief and a cross crosslet fitchée in base gules

Parliament of the United Kingdom
Preceded by William Wells; Arthur Hamilton-Gordon	Member of Parliament for Beverley; 1857 – 1859; With: Edward Glover 1857; Sir Henry Edwards 1857–1859	Succeeded by Sir Henry Edwards; Ralph Walters
Preceded by Sir John Vanden-Bempde-Johnstone; John Dent	Member of Parliament for Scarborough; 1859 – 1860; With: Sir John Vanden-Bempde-Johnstone	Succeeded by Sir John Vanden-Bempde-Johnstone; John Dent
Peerage of the United Kingdom
New creation	Earl of Londesborough; 1887–1900	Succeeded by William Denison
Preceded by Albert Denison	Baron Londesborough; 1860–1900	Succeeded by William Denison
