= Ralph Walters =

Politician, died 1865

Member of Parliament for Beverley
- In office 29 April 1859 – 9 August 1859 Serving with Henry Edwards
- Preceded by: Henry Edwards; William Denison
- Succeeded by: Henry Edwards; James Walker

Personal details
- Born: c. 1800
- Died: 20 April 1865
- Party: Liberal

Ralph Walters (c. 1800 – 20 April 1865) was a British Liberal politician and Member of Parliament.

After an unsuccessful attempt to be elected as an Independent Liberal candidate at Gateshead in 1852, Walters was elected as the Liberal MP for Beverley in the 1859 general election. However, just four months after his election, he was unseated due to bribery during campaigning.

Parliament of the United Kingdom
| Preceded by Henry Edwards; William Denison | Member of Parliament for Beverley; April 1859 – August 1859; With: Henry Edwards | Succeeded by Henry Edwards; James Walker |
