= Sir Henry Edwards, 1st Baronet =

English Conservative politician

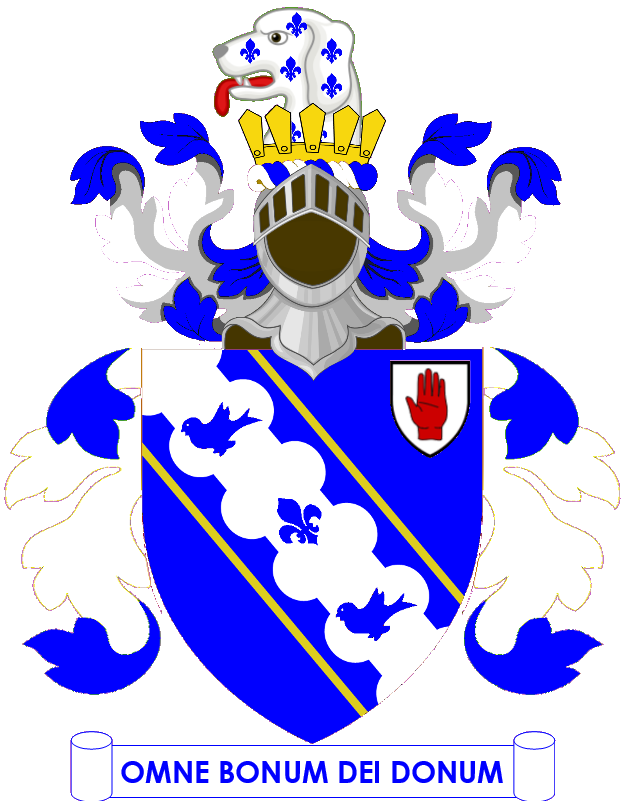
- Crest: Out of a crown vallery Or a talbot’s head Argent seme-de-lis Azure.
- Shield: Azure on a bend nebuly Argent cottised Or a fleur-de-lis between two martlets of the field
- Motto: Omne Bonum Dei Donum

Sir Henry Edwards, 1st Baronet CB (20 July 1812 – 23 April 1886) was an English Conservative politician who sat in the House of Commons in two periods between 1847 and 1869.

Edwards was born at Pye Nest in Halifax, Yorkshire, and was the son of Henry Lees Edwards and Lea Priestley. He was J.P. and Deputy Lieutenant for the West Riding of Yorkshire and reached the rank of Colonel in the 2nd West Yorkshire Regiment Yeomanry Cavalry.

In 1847 Edwards was elected Member of Parliament (MP) for Halifax and held the seat until 1852. In 1857 he was elected MP for Beverley and was re-elected in subsequent elections. He was created a baronet of Pye Nest on 3 August 1866. After the 1868 general election the election was declared void on 11 Mar 1869. No writ was issued to replace the members and the constituency was disenfranchised by an Act which received Royal assent on 4 July 1870. Edwards was High Sheriff of Yorkshire in 1872. In 1875, he was appointed by the Freemasons as Provincial Grand Master of West Yorkshire.

Edwards died in 1886 at Pye Nest at the age of 73.

Edwards married Maria Churchill Coster, daughter of Thomas Coster, on 19 April 1838. He was succeeded in the baronetcy by his son Henry.

Parliament of the United Kingdom
Preceded by Edward Davis Protheroe; Sir Charles Wood	Member of Parliament for Halifax; 1847–1852; With: Sir Charles Wood	Succeeded by Francis Crossley; Sir Charles Wood
Preceded by Edward Glover; William Denison	Member of Parliament for Beverley; 1857–1869; With: William Denison to 1859; Ralph Walters 1859–1860; James Walker 1860–1865; Christopher Sykes 1865–1868; Edmund Hegan Kennard from 1868	Writ suspended Constituency abolished 1870
Baronetage of the United Kingdom
New creation	Baronet of Pye Nest; 1866–1886	Succeeded by Henry Coster Lea Edwards
