= Tibor Szabo (English footballer) =

English footballer (1959–2024)

Personal information
- Full name: Tibor Lewis Szabo
- Date of birth: 28 October 1959
- Place of birth: Bradford, England
- Date of death: 5 August 2024 (aged 64)
- Position: Forward

Youth career
- 19??–1977: Bradford City

Senior career*
Years	Team	Apps	(Gls)
1977–1979	Bradford City	13	(1)
1979–1980	Macclesfield Town	42	(16)
1980–1984	Mossley		
1984–198?	Gainsborough Trinity		
1985–198?	→ Mossley (loan)		
- Goole Town
- Mossley
- Morecambe
- Buxton
- Accrington Stanley
- Atherton Laburnum Rovers
- Harrogate Railway Athletic
- Ossett Albion
- Ossett Town
- Liversedge
- Eccleshill United
- East Bowling Unity
- * Club domestic league appearances and goals

Tibor Lewis Szabo (Hungarian: Szabó; 28 October 1959 – 5 August 2024) was an English footballer who played in the Football League as a forward for Bradford City.

Born in Bradford to Hungarian parents, Szabo also played in non-league football for clubs including Macclesfield Town, Mossley, Gainsborough Trinity, Goole Town, Morecambe, Buxton, Accrington Stanley, Atherton Laburnum Rovers, Harrogate Railway Athletic, Ossett Albion, Ossett Town, Liversedge, Eccleshill United and East Bowling Unity. He taught PE, and after his playing career ended, he coached juniors in both England and the United States.

Szabo died while out cycling, on 5 August 2024, at the age of 64.
