= Edwards baronets of York (1691) =

Escutcheon of the Edwards baronets of York

The Edwards baronetcy, of York in the County of York, was created in the Baronetage of England on 7 December 1691 for James Edwards; his uncle Sir James Edwards, a Lord Mayor of London, had lent money to Charles II in exile. The title became extinct on the death of the 3rd Baronet in 1764.

== Edwards baronets, of York (1691) ==
- Sir James Edwards, 1st Baronet (died 1702)
- Sir James Edwards, 2nd Baronet (c. 1689–1744)
- Sir Nathaniel Edwards, 3rd Baronet (c. 1699–1764)
