= John Bryn Edwards =

Welsh ironmaster and philanthropist (1889-1922)

Sir John Bryn Edwards Bt
- Born: 12 January 1889
- Died: 22 August 1922 (aged 33)
- Occupations: Ironmaster and philanthropist

Sir John Bryn Edwards, 1st Baronet (12 January 1889 – 22 August 1922) was a Welsh ironmaster and philanthropist whose seemingly promising future as a figure of political and social leadership in post-World War I Britain was cut short by death at the age of 33.

Edwards was educated at Winchester College and received his BA and MA from Trinity Hall, Cambridge. As the owner of a major metalworking concern known as the Duffryn Steel and Tinplate Works, he had the resources to fund a number of philanthropic and charitable endeavours for which he was recognised in the 1921 Birthday Honours by being created, at the unusually young age of 32, a baronet of Treforis in the County of Glamorgan.

Edwards married Kathleen Ermyntrude Corfield, daughter of John Corfield, managing director of Dillwyn & Co, on 18 January 1911. They had a son and a daughter. In the years following his death, Hendrefoilan House, which he purchased in 1920, became part of the campus of Swansea University and was the site, until 2006, of the South Wales Miners' Library. He is buried, alongside his wife, in Oystermouth Cemetery in Mumbles, Swansea.

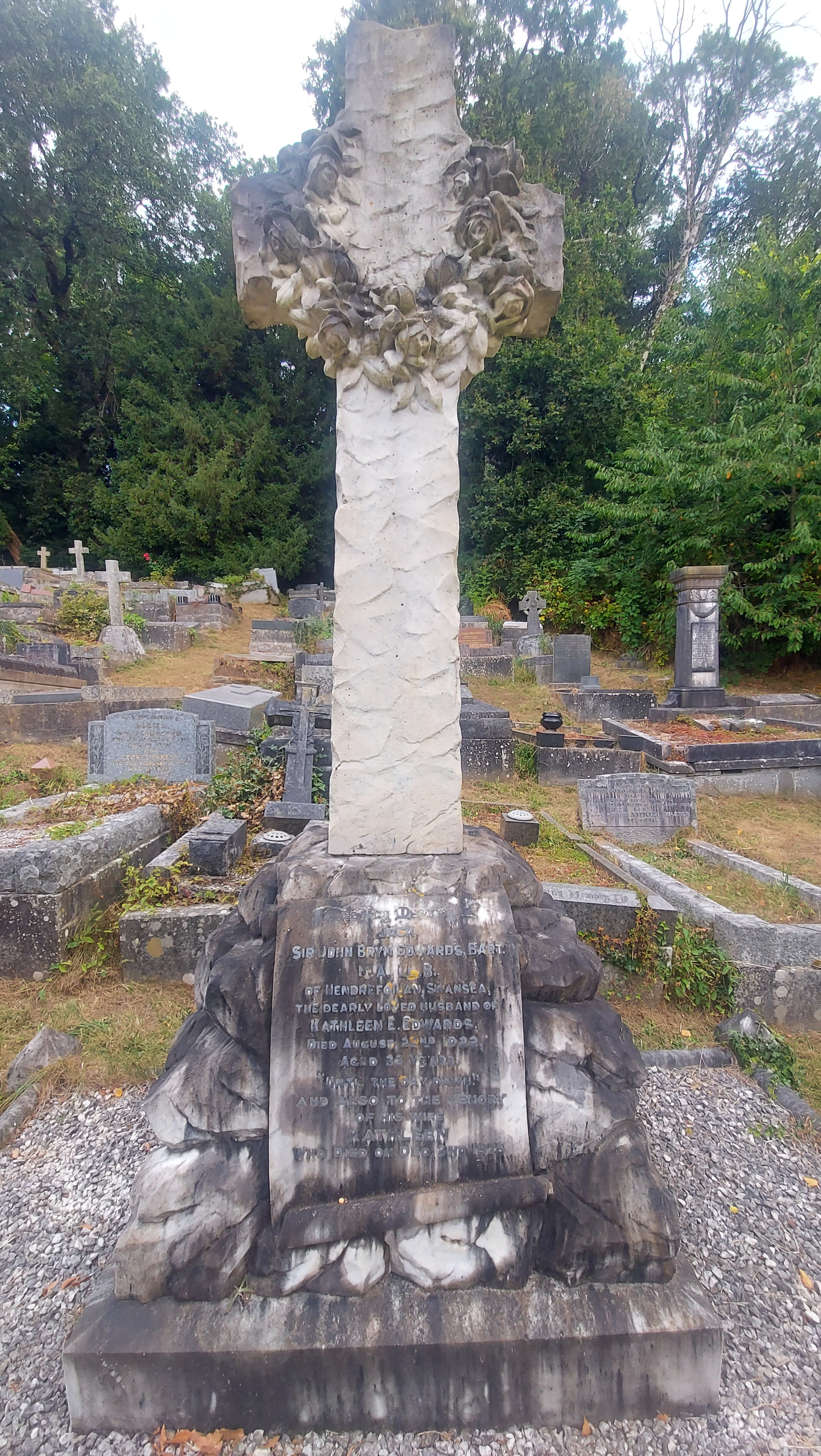
Grave of Sir John Bryn Edwards. Oystermouth Cemetery, Mumbles, Swansea

== Footnotes ==
Baronetage of the United Kingdom
New creation	Baronet (of Treforis); 1921–1922	Succeeded by John Edwards
