= Beverley (constituency) =

UK Parliament constituency (1983–1997)

- Former county constituency for the House of Commons
- Beverley in Humberside, showing boundaries used from 1983–1997
- County: East Riding of Yorkshire

1983–1997
- Seats: One
- Created from: Haltemprice
- Replaced by: Beverley and Holderness Haltemprice and Howden

1950–1955
- Seats: One
- Type of constituency: County constituency
- Created from: Buckrose, Holderness and Howdenshire
- Replaced by: Haltemprice and Howden

1563–1869
- Seats: Two
- Type of constituency: Borough constituency
- Created from: Yorkshire
- Replaced by: East Riding of Yorkshire

1295–1306
- Type of constituency: Borough constituency
- Replaced by: Yorkshire

Beverley has been the name of a parliamentary constituency in the East Riding of Yorkshire for three periods. From medieval times until 1869 it was a parliamentary borough consisting of a limited electorate of property owners of its early designated borders within the market town of Beverley, which returned (elected) two Members of Parliament to the House of Commons of the English and Welsh-turned-UK Parliament during that period (sometimes called burgesses).

A form of a Beverley seat was revived for a single-member county constituency created in 1950, abolished in 1955, and similarly between the 1983 and 1992 general elections inclusive after which the area was largely incorporated into one 1997-created seat Beverley and Holderness; the remainder of the seat contributed to two other late 20th century-created seats.

== History ==
=== The parliamentary borough ===
Beverley was first represented in the Model Parliament of 1295, but after 1306 it did not elect members again until 1563. Thereafter it maintained two members until being disfranchised in 1870. The borough consisted of the three parishes of the town of Beverley, and by 1831 had a population of 7,432 and 1,928 houses. The right of election was vested not in the population as a whole, but in the freemen of the borough, whether resident or not; at the contested election of 1826, 2,276 votes were cast.

The borough was large enough to retain two members under the compromise of the Great Reform Act 1832 when its boundaries were slightly extended to include some outlying fringes, increasing the population by roughly 800. The first of three progressive acts, by the Redistribution of Seats Act 1885 were such boroughs more equally thus fairly apportioned.

For much of the borough's history, elections in Beverley were notorious for their corruption. In 1727, one of the victorious candidates was unseated on petition, his agents were imprisoned and Parliament passed the Bribery Act 1729 as a result. Between 1857 and 1868 six petitions were lodged against election results, of which three succeeded in voiding the election and unseating one or more of the victors. After the 1868 election, the writ for the borough was suspended and a royal commission appointed to inquire into the conduct of elections in Beverley; when it reported that it had found proof of extensive bribery, the Bridgwater and Beverley Disfranchisement Act 1870 (33 & 34 Vict. c. 21) was passed permanently depriving Beverley of the right to return Members of Parliament, abolishing the constituency and incorporating it within the East Riding constituency.

The novelist Anthony Trollope was one of the defeated candidates in the final corrupt election for which Beverley was disfranchised. He drew on his experience directly for his description of the Percycross election in his novel Ralph the Heir, and also told the story in his Autobiography. He found that corruption was taken for granted and that the price of a vote was between 15 shillings and £1. His unsuccessful campaign cost him £400. Sir Henry Edwards and Edmund Hegan Kennard were those candidates deemed elected Members of Parliament in this final contest for the constituency.

=== 1950 to 1955 ===
The Beverley constituency which existed from 1950 to 1955 was a predominantly rural one. Under the boundary revisions introduced by the Representation of the People Act 1948, which came into effect at the 1950 general election, the three existing county constituencies of the East Riding were abolished, and the county was divided into two new constituencies, each named after their biggest towns – Bridlington and Beverley. The new Beverley constituency comprised the western half of the Riding. This encompassed parts of all three of the county's previously existing constituencies (Buckrose, Holderness and Howdenshire).

The Beverley constituency was abolished in further boundary changes implemented at the 1955 general election, being divided between the new Haltemprice and Howden seats.

=== 1983 to 1997 ===
Beverley again became a constituency name in 1983, this time for a constituency mostly suburban in character. The new constituency replaced, and strongly resembled, the Haltemprice constituency which had been introduced in 1955: its main components apart from Beverley were the prosperous suburbs to the north and west of Hull, such as Cottingham, Anlaby and Kirk Ella.

The Beverley constituency was abolished in 1997 general election, Beverley itself moving to the new Beverley and Holderness constituency.

== Boundaries ==
1950–1955: The Borough of Beverley, the Urban District of Norton, and the Rural Districts of Beverley, Derwent, Howden, Norton, and Pocklington.

1983–1997: The East Yorkshire Borough of Beverley wards of Anlaby, Brough, Castle, Hessle East, Hessle West, Kirk Ella, Leconfield, Leven, Mill Beck and Croxby, Minster North, Minster South, Molescroft, Priory, St Mary's East, St Mary's West, Springfield, Swanland, Tickton, Willerby, and Woodmansey.

== Members of Parliament ==
=== Beverley borough ===
==== 1563–1660 ====
| Parliament | Year | First member | Second member |
|---|---|---|---|
| Parliament of 1563–1567 | | Nicholas Bacon | Robert Hall |
| Parliament of 1571 | | Edward Ellerker | Thomas Layton |
| Parliament of 1572–1583 | | Richard Topcliffe | Thomas Aglionby |
| Parliament of 1584–1585 | | Robert Wrote | John Stanhope |
| Parliament of 1586–1587 | | Michael Wharton | George Purefoy |
| Parliament of 1588–1589 | | Lancelot Alford | John Truslove |
| Parliament of 1593 | | John Mansfield | Edward Alford |
| Parliament of 1597–1598 | | Thomas Crompton | Edward Fraunceys |
| Parliament of 1601 | | Edward Fraunceys | Ralph Ewens |
| Parliament of 1604–1611 | | William Gee | Allan Percy |
| Addled Parliament (1614) | | William Towse | Edmund Scott |
| Parliament of 1621–1622 | | Sir Christopher Hilliard | Edmund Scott |
| Happy Parliament (1624–1625) | | Sir Henry Vane the elder, replaced 1624 by Sir Henry Carey | Edmund Scott |
| Useless Parliament (1625) | | Sir John Hotham, Bt | Sir William Alford |
| Parliament of 1625–1626 | | Sir John Hotham, Bt | Sir William Alford |
| Parliament of 1628–1629 | | Sir John Hotham, Bt | Sir William Alford |
No Parliament summoned 1629–1640
| Short Parliament (1640) | | Sir John Hotham, Bt | Michael Warton |
| Long Parliament (1640–1653) | 1640 | Sir John Hotham, Bt (Royalist) disabled to sit, September 1643 | Michael Warton (Royalist) disabled to sit, January 1644 |
| Long Parliament (1640–1653) | 1645 | James Nelthorpe | John Nelthorpe |
| Long Parliament (1640–1653) | 1648 | James Nelthorpe | John Nelthorpe excluded in Pride's Purge |
| Barebones Parliament (1653) | Beverley not represented | | |
| First Protectorate Parliament (1654–1655) | | Francis Thorpe | (One member only) |
| Second Protectorate Parliament (1656–1658) | | Francis Thorpe | (One member only) |
| Third Protectorate Parliament (1659) | | Thomas Strickland | John Anlaby |
| Long Parliament (restored, 1659–1660) | | James Nelthorpe | |

==== 1660–1869 ====
| Year | First member | First party | Second member | Second party |
|---|---|---|---|---|
| April 1660 | Hugh Bethell | | Sir John Hotham, Bt | |
| June 1660 | Michael Warton | | Sir John Hotham, Bt | |
| 1685 | Michael Warton | | Sir Ralph Warton | |
| 1689 | Sir Michael Warton | Tory | Sir John Hotham, Bt | |
| 1689 | Sir Michael Warton | Tory | Sir John Hotham, Bt | |
| 1690 | Sir Michael Warton | Tory | William Gee | |
| 1695 | Sir Michael Warton | Tory | Ralph Warton | Tory |
| 1701 | Sir Michael Warton | Tory | William Gee | Whig |
| 1702 | Sir Charles Hotham, Bt | Whig | William Gee | Whig |
| 1705 | Sir Charles Hotham, Bt | Whig | John Moyser | |
| 1708 | Sir Charles Hotham, Bt | Whig | Sir Michael Warton | |
| 1722 | Sir Charles Hotham, Bt | Whig | Michael Newton | |
| 1723 | Sir Charles Hotham, Bt | Whig | Michael Newton | |
| 1727 | Ellerker Bradshaw | Whig | Charles Pelham | Tory |
| 1729 | Sir Charles Hotham, Bt | Whig | Charles Pelham | Tory |
| 1734 | Sir Charles Hotham, Bt | Whig | Ellerker Bradshaw | Whig |
| 1738 | Charles Pelham | Tory | Ellerker Bradshaw | Whig |
| 1741 | Charles Pelham | Tory | William Strickland | |
| 1747 | Charles Pelham | Tory | Sir William Codrington, Bt | |
| 1754 | John Tufnell | | Sir William Codrington, Bt | |
| 1761 | Michael Newton | | George Tufnell | |
| 1768 | Hugh Bethell | | Charles Anderson-Pelham | |
| 1772 | Sir Griffith Boynton, Bt | | Charles Anderson-Pelham | |
| 1774 | George Tufnell | | Sir James Pennyman, Bt | |
| 1780 | Francis Evelyn Anderson | | Sir James Pennyman, Bt | |
| 1784 | Sir Christopher Sykes, Bt | | Sir James Pennyman, Bt | |
| 1790 | John Wharton | Whig | Sir James Pennyman, Bt | |
| 1796 | William Tatton | | Napier Christie Burton | |
| 1799 | John Morritt | Tory | Napier Christie Burton | |
| 1802 | John Wharton | Whig | Napier Christie Burton | |
| 1806 | John Wharton | Whig | Richard Vyse | |
| 1807 | John Wharton | Whig | Howard Vyse | |
| 1812 | John Wharton | Whig | Charles Forbes | Tory |
| 1818 | John Wharton | Whig | Robert Christie Burton | Tory |
| 1820 | John Wharton | Whig | George Lane-Fox | Tory |
| 1826 | John Stewart | Tory | Charles Harrison Batley | Tory |
| 1830 | Daniel Sykes | Whig | Henry Burton | Whig |
| 1831 | William Marshall | Whig | Henry Burton | Whig |
| 1832 | Hon. Charles Langdale | Whig | Henry Burton | Whig |
| 1835 | James Hogg | Conservative | Henry Burton | Whig |
| 1837 | James Hogg | Conservative | George Lane-Fox | Conservative |
| 1840 | James Hogg | Conservative | Sackville Lane-Fox | Conservative |
| 1841 | James Hogg | Conservative | John Towneley | Whig |
| 1847 | Sackville Lane-Fox | Conservative | John Towneley | Whig |
| 1852 | Hon. Francis Charles Lawley | Radical | William Wells | Radical |
| 1854 | Hon. Arthur Hamilton-Gordon | Peelite | William Wells | Radical |
| Mar. 1857 | Edward Glover | Independent Conservative | Hon. William Denison | Whig |
| Aug. 1857 | Henry Edwards | Conservative | Hon. William Denison | Whig |
| 1859 | Henry Edwards | Conservative | Ralph Walters | Liberal |
| 1860 | Henry Edwards | Conservative | James Walker | Conservative |
| 1865 | Henry Edwards | Conservative | Christopher Sykes | Conservative |
| 1868 | Henry Edwards | Conservative | Edmund Hegan Kennard | Conservative |

Writ suspended 1869, constituency abolished 1870

=== Beverley County Constituency (1950–1955) ===
| Election | Member | Party |
|---|---|---|
| 1950 | George Odey | Conservative |
| 1955 | constituency abolished | |

=== Beverley County Constituency (1983–1997) ===
| Election | Member | Party |
|---|---|---|
| 1983 | Patrick Wall | Conservative |
| 1987 | James Cran | Conservative |
| 1997 | constituency abolished | |

== Elections ==
=== Elections in the 1830s ===
General election 1830: Beverley
| Party | Candidate | Votes | % | ±% |
|---|---|---|---|---|
| Whig | Henry Burton | 1,065 | 43.3 | |
| Whig | Daniel Sykes | 739 | 30.0 | |
| Tory | Capel Cure | 657 | 26.7 | |
| Majority | | 82 | 3.3 | N/A |
| Turnout | | 1,420 | | |
| Whig gain from Tory | | Swing | | |
| Whig gain from Tory | | Swing | | |

General election 1831: Beverley
| Party | Candidate | Votes | % | ±% |
|---|---|---|---|---|
| Whig | William Marshall | 734 | 41.1 | +11.1 |
| Whig | Henry Burton | 705 | 39.4 | −3.9 |
| Tory | Charles Winn | 349 | 19.5 | −7.2 |
| Majority | | 356 | 19.9 | +16.6 |
| Turnout | | 1,204 | | |
| Whig hold | | Swing | +7.4 | |
| Whig hold | | Swing | −0.2 | |

General election 1832: Beverley
| Party | Candidate | Votes | % | ±% |
|---|---|---|---|---|
| Whig | Charles Langdale | 516 | 35.1 | −6.0 |
| Whig | Henry Burton | 490 | 33.3 | −6.1 |
| Tory | Charles Winn | 464 | 31.6 | +12.1 |
| Majority | | 26 | 1.8 | −18.1 |
| Turnout | | 971 | 96.0 | |
| Registered electors | | 1,011 | | |
| Whig hold | | Swing | −6.0 | |
| Whig hold | | Swing | −6.1 | |

General election 1835: Beverley
| Party | Candidate | Votes | % | ±% |
|---|---|---|---|---|
| Conservative | James Hogg | 523 | 39.2 | +7.6 |
| Whig | Henry Burton | 497 | 37.3 | +4.0 |
| Whig | Joseph Sykes | 314 | 23.5 | −11.6 |
| Majority | | 209 | 15.7 | N/A |
| Turnout | | 994 | 95.4 | −0.6 |
| Registered electors | | 1,042 | | |
| Conservative gain from Whig | | Swing | +7.6 | |
| Whig hold | | Swing | +0.1 | |

General election 1837: Beverley
| Party | Candidate | Votes | % | ±% |
|---|---|---|---|---|
| Conservative | James Hogg | 622 | 32.2 | +12.6 |
| Conservative | George Lane-Fox | 582 | 30.1 | +10.5 |
| Whig | James Clay | 380 | 19.7 | −17.6 |
| Whig | George Rennie | 347 | 18.0 | −5.5 |
| Majority | | 242 | 12.5 | N/A |
| Turnout | | 976 | 91.9 | −3.5 |
| Registered electors | | 1,062 | | |
| Conservative hold | | Swing | +12.1 | |
| Conservative gain from Whig | | Swing | +11.0 | |

=== Elections in the 1840s ===
Lane-Fox resigned by accepting the office of Steward of the Chiltern Hundreds, causing a by-election.

By-election, 24 January 1840: Beverley
| Party | Candidate | Votes | % | ±% |
|---|---|---|---|---|
| Conservative | Sackville Lane-Fox | 556 | 57.6 | −4.7 |
| Whig | Thomas Lamie Murray | 410 | 42.4 | +4.7 |
| Majority | | 146 | 15.2 | +2.7 |
| Turnout | | 966 | 91.7 | −0.2 |
| Registered electors | | 1,053 | | |
| Conservative hold | | Swing | −4.7 | |

General election 1841: Beverley
| Party | Candidate | Votes | % | ±% |
|---|---|---|---|---|
| Whig | John Towneley | 531 | 34.3 | −3.4 |
| Conservative | James Hogg | 529 | 34.2 | +2.0 |
| Conservative | Sackville Lane-Fox | 489 | 31.6 | +1.5 |
| Majority | | 42 | 3.7 | N/A |
| Turnout | | 1,012 | 94.3 | +2.4 |
| Registered electors | | 1,073 | | |
| Whig gain from Conservative | | Swing | −3.4 | |
| Conservative hold | | Swing | +1.9 | |

General election 1847: Beverley
| Party | Candidate | Votes | % | ±% |
|---|---|---|---|---|
| Whig | John Towneley | 543 | 40.5 | +6.2 |
| Conservative | Sackville Lane-Fox | 542 | 40.4 | +8.8 |
| Whig | Isaac Goldsmid | 257 | 19.2 | N/A |
| Turnout | | 671 (est) | 49.4 (est) | −44.9 |
| Registered electors | | 1,357 | | |
| Majority | | 1 | 0.1 | −3.6 |
| Whig hold | | Swing | −1.3 | |
| Majority | | 285 | 21.2 | |
| Conservative hold | | Swing | +1.3 | |

=== Elections in the 1850s ===
General election 1852: Beverley
| Party | Candidate | Votes | % | ±% |
|---|---|---|---|---|
| Radical | Francis Charles Lawley | 611 | 36.1 | N/A |
| Radical | William Wells | 584 | 34.5 | N/A |
| Ind. Conservative | Edward Glover | 497 | 29.4 | N/A |
| Majority | | 87 | 5.1 | N/A |
| Turnout | | 1,095 (est) | 77.9 (est) | +28.5 |
| Registered electors | | 1,405 | | |
| Radical gain from Conservative | | Swing | N/A | |
| Radical gain from Whig | | Swing | N/A | |

Lawley resigned after he was found to have been using his position as secretary to the Chancellor of the Exchequer for insider trading, causing a by-election.

By-election, 31 July 1854: Beverley
| Party | Candidate | Votes | % | ±% |
|---|---|---|---|---|
| Peelite | Arthur Hamilton-Gordon | 493 | 72.0 | N/A |
| Independent Whig | George Hastings | 192 | 28.0 | N/A |
| Majority | | 301 | 44.0 | N/A |
| Turnout | | 685 | 51.4 | −26.5 |
| Registered electors | | 1,333 | | |
| Peelite gain from Radical | | Swing | N/A | |

General election 1857: Beverley
| Party | Candidate | Votes | % | ±% |
|---|---|---|---|---|
| Whig | William Denison | 566 | 35.5 | N/A |
| Ind. Conservative | Edward Glover | 537 | 33.7 | +8.3 |
| Radical | William Wells | 492 | 30.8 | −3.7 |
| Turnout | | 798 (est) | 70.2 (est) | −7.7 |
| Registered electors | | 1,136 | | |
| Majority | | 74 | 4.7 | N/A |
| Whig gain from Radical | | Swing | N/A | |
| Majority | | 45 | 2.9 | N/A |
| Ind. Conservative gain from Radical | | Swing | +5.1 | |

Glover's election was declared void on petition, after he was found to have lied about meeting the required property qualifications, causing a by-election.

By-election, 11 August 1857: Beverley
| Party | Candidate | Votes | % | ±% |
|---|---|---|---|---|
| Conservative | Henry Edwards | 579 | 59.1 | N/A |
| Radical | William Wells | 401 | 40.9 | +10.1 |
| Majority | | 178 | 18.2 | N/A |
| Turnout | | 980 | 86.3 | +16.1 |
| Registered electors | | 1,136 | | |
| Conservative gain from Ind. Conservative | | Swing | N/A | |

General election 1859: Beverley
| Party | Candidate | Votes | % | ±% |
|---|---|---|---|---|
| Liberal | Ralph Walters | 605 | 37.0 | −29.3 |
| Conservative | Henry Edwards | 539 | 32.9 | N/A |
| Conservative | James Walker | 439 | 26.8 | N/A |
| Independent | Edward Glover | 54 | 3.3 | −30.4 |
| Turnout | | 819 (est) | 67.6 (est) | −2.6 |
| Registered electors | | 1,210 | | |
| Majority | | 166 | 10.2 | +5.5 |
| Liberal hold | | Swing | +0.6 | |
| Majority | | 485 | 29.6 | N/A |
| Conservative gain from Ind. Conservative | | Swing | N/A | |

=== Elections in the 1860s ===
Walters' election was declared void on petition.

By-election, 31 Jan 1860: Beverley
| Party | Candidate | Votes | % | ±% |
|---|---|---|---|---|
| Conservative | James Walker | 599 | 55.9 | −3.8 |
| Liberal | Henry Gridley | 473 | 44.1 | +7.1 |
| Majority | | 126 | 11.8 | N/A |
| Turnout | | 1,072 | 88.4 | +16.8 |
| Registered electors | | 1,213 | | |
| Conservative gain from Liberal | | Swing | −5.5 | |

General election 1865: Beverley
| Party | Candidate | Votes | % | ±% |
|---|---|---|---|---|
| Conservative | Henry Edwards | 689 | 37.8 | +4.9 |
| Conservative | Christopher Sykes | 637 | 35.0 | +8.2 |
| Liberal | David Keane | 495 | 27.2 | −9.8 |
| Majority | | 142 | 7.8 | −21.8 |
| Turnout | | 1,158 (est) | 93.5 (est) | +25.9 |
| Registered electors | | 1,239 | | |
| Conservative hold | | Swing | +4.9 | |
| Conservative gain from Liberal | | Swing | +6.6 | |

General election 1868: Beverley
| Party | Candidate | Votes | % | ±% |
|---|---|---|---|---|
| Conservative | Henry Edwards | 1,132 | 30.2 | −7.6 |
| Conservative | Edmund Hegan Kennard | 986 | 26.3 | −8.7 |
| Liberal | Marmaduke Maxwell | 895 | 23.8 | +10.2 |
| Liberal | Anthony Trollope | 740 | 19.7 | +6.1 |
| Majority | | 91 | 2.5 | −5.3 |
| Turnout | | 1,877 (est) | 70.2 (est) | −23.3 |
| Registered electors | | 2,672 | | |
| Conservative hold | | Swing | −8.9 | |
| Conservative hold | | Swing | −7.4 | |

A Royal Commission was appointed to investigate the seat and, after finding extensive bribery, the borough's writ was suspended, the election result voided, and the seat was absorbed into East Riding of Yorkshire.

=== Elections in the 1950s ===
General election 1950: Beverley
| Party | Candidate | Votes | % | ±% |
|---|---|---|---|---|
| Conservative | George Odey | 26,699 | 55.7 | |
| Labour | Arnold William Gray | 12,399 | 25.9 | |
| Liberal | Harold Stewart Freemantle | 7,719 | 16.1 | |
| Ind. Conservative | G. Thorley | 1,121 | 2.3 | |
| Majority | | 14,300 | 29.8 | |
| Turnout | | 47,938 | 83.0 | |
| Conservative win (new seat) | | | | |

General election 1951: Beverley
| Party | Candidate | Votes | % | ±% |
|---|---|---|---|---|
| Conservative | George Odey | 27,937 | 59.1 | +3.4 |
| Labour | Thomas Brennan | 12,778 | 27.1 | +1.2 |
| Liberal | Harold Stewart Freemantle | 6,522 | 13.8 | −1.3 |
| Majority | | 15,159 | 32.0 | +2.2 |
| Turnout | | 47,237 | 80.0 | −3.0 |
| Conservative hold | | Swing | +1.1 | |

=== Elections in the 1980s ===
General election 1983: Beverley
| Party | Candidate | Votes | % | ±% |
|---|---|---|---|---|
| Conservative | Patrick Wall | 31,233 | 56.3 | |
| Liberal | Michael Ford Pitts | 17,364 | 31.3 | |
| Labour | Elliot Morley | 6,921 | 12.5 | |
| Majority | | 13,869 | 25.0 | |
| Turnout | | 55,518 | 73.2 | |
| Conservative win (new seat) | | | | |

General election 1987: Beverley
| Party | Candidate | Votes | % | ±% |
|---|---|---|---|---|
| Conservative | James Cran | 31,459 | 52.2 | −4.1 |
| Liberal | John Bryant (British politician) | 18,864 | 31.3 | 0.0 |
| Labour | Martin Shaw | 9,901 | 16.4 | +3.9 |
| Majority | | 12,595 | 20.9 | −4.1 |
| Turnout | | 60,224 | 76.3 | +3.1 |
| Conservative hold | | Swing | −2.1 | |

=== Elections in the 1990s ===
General election 1992: Beverley
| Party | Candidate | Votes | % | ±% |
|---|---|---|---|---|
| Conservative | James Cran | 34,503 | 53.3 | +1.1 |
| Liberal Democrats | Andrew Collinge | 17,986 | 27.8 | −3.5 |
| Labour | Colin Challen | 12,026 | 18.6 | +2.2 |
| Natural Law | D Hetherington | 199 | 0.3 | New |
| Majority | | 16,517 | 25.5 | +4.6 |
| Turnout | | 64,714 | 79.9 | +3.6 |
| Conservative hold | | Swing | +2.3 | |

== See also ==
- List of parliamentary constituencies in Humberside

== Sources ==
- F. W. S. Craig, "British Parliamentary Election Results 1832–1885" (2nd edition, Aldershot: Parliamentary Research Services, 1989)
- D. Brunton & D. H. Pennington, “Members of the Long Parliament” (London: George Allen & Unwin, 1954)
- Michael Kinnear, "The British Voter" (London: Batsford, 1968)
- H. G. Nicholas, "To The Hustings" (London: Cassell & Co., 1956)
- J. Holladay Philbin, "Parliamentary Representation 1832 – England and Wales" (New Haven: Yale University Press, 1965)
- Henry Stooks Smith, "The Parliaments of England from 1715 to 1847" (2nd edition, edited by FWS Craig – Chichester: Parliamentary Reference Publications, 1973)
- Robert Waller, "The Almanac of British Politics" (3rd edition, London: Croom Helm, 1987)
- Frederic A. Youngs, jr, "Guide to the Local Administrative Units of England, Vol II" (London: Royal Historical Society, 1991)
- Victoria County History of the East Riding of Yorkshire
- "Beverley, 1700–1835 – Parliamentary Elections" from the Victoria County History
