= Vyse =

Vyse may refer to:

- Richard William Howard Vyse (1784–1853), British soldier, anthropologist and Egyptologist
- Richard Vyse (1746–1825), British military General, father of Richard William Howard Vyse
- William Vyse (1710–1770), Archdeacon of Salop, father of General Richard Vyse
- William Vyse (1742–1816), Archdeacon of Coventry, brother of General Richard Vyse
- Vyse, main character in the console role-playing game Skies of Arcadia
