= John Bacon Sawrey Morritt =

British politician

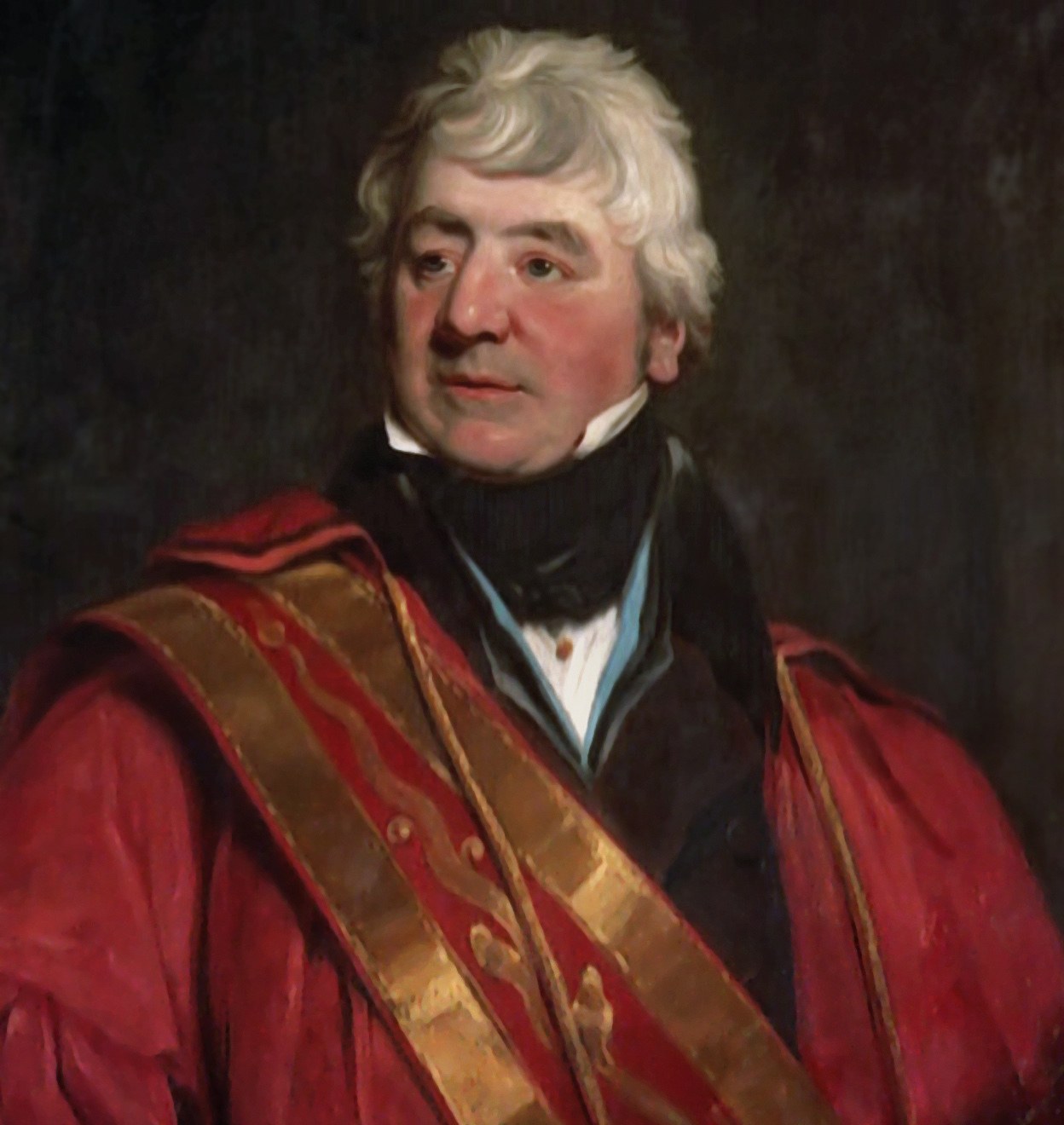
- Born: c. 1772
- Died: 12 July 1843; Rokeby Park
- Education: St John's College, Cambridge
- Occupations: MP high sheriff of Yorkshire
- Known for: Travellers' Club

John Bacon Sawrey Morritt (1772? – 1843) was an English traveller, politician and classical scholar.

== Early life ==
Born about 1772, he was son and heir of John Sawrey Morritt, who died at Rokeby Park in Yorkshire on 3 August 1791, by his wife Anne (died 1809), daughter of Henry Peirse of Bedale., M.P. for Northallerton. Both parents were buried in a vault in Rokeby Church, where their son erected to their memory a monument with a poetic inscription.

Morritt had been in Paris during 1789, and was educated at St John's College, Cambridge, where he was admitted later that year. He graduated B.A. 1794 and M.A. 1798. He inherited a large fortune, including the estate of Rokeby, which his father had purchased from Sir Thomas Robinson, 1st Baronet in 1769.

== On tour ==
Early in 1794, Morritt set off east, and spent two years in travelling, mainly in Greece and Asia Minor. One consequence of his journeying was the wide adoption in English of the term Balkan Mountains by English speakers, in place of the classical name Haemus Mons. The use of Balkan Peninsula for south-east Europe came a little later, with August Zeune (1808).

Morritt travelled from Vienna to Istanbul, where the embarrassed Robert Liston found the British embassy was in no state to lodge him. On a quest for Troy, he arrived, with James Dallaway and other Englishmen, from Lesbos on 6 November 1794, landing about twenty miles below Cape Lectum, in the Sinus Adramyttenus. There he made a survey of the supposed scene of the Iliad.

== In politics ==
A conservative in politics, Morritt was returned to parliament by the borough of Beverley at a by-election in 1799. There he had the support of Lord Yarborough and Sir Christopher Sykes. He was defeated at the dissolution in 1802.

In 1806, Morritt served as high sheriff of Yorkshire, and in 1807 he made a speech at the nomination of William Wilberforce for Yorkshire. In 1814 he was elected on a by vacancy for the constituency of Northallerton, which he represented until 1818, and he sat for Shaftesbury in Dorset from 1818 to 1820.

== Associations ==
Morritt paid Sir Walter Scott a visit in the summer of 1808, and was again his guest in 1816 and January 1829. Their friendship was never broken. Scott, on his return from London in 1809, spent a fortnight at Rokeby, which he admired. In December 1811 he told Morritt his intention of making it the scene of a poem, and received in reply a letter on its history. Scott's second stay in autumn 1812 resulted in Rokeby, praised for its local descriptions. It was dedicated to Morritt, who was entrusted with the secret of the authorship of the Waverley novels.

Scott's visits were renewed in 1815, 1826, 1828, and in September 1831 on his last journey to London and Italy. Letters which passed between them are included in John Gibson Lockhart's Life of Scott; others are in Familiar Letters of Sir Walter Scott (1894). Morritt, on Scott's invitation, became an occasional contributor to the Quarterly Review, and his poem "The Curse of Moy, a Highland Tale" appeared in the Minstrelsy of the Scottish Border (5th edit. iii. 451).

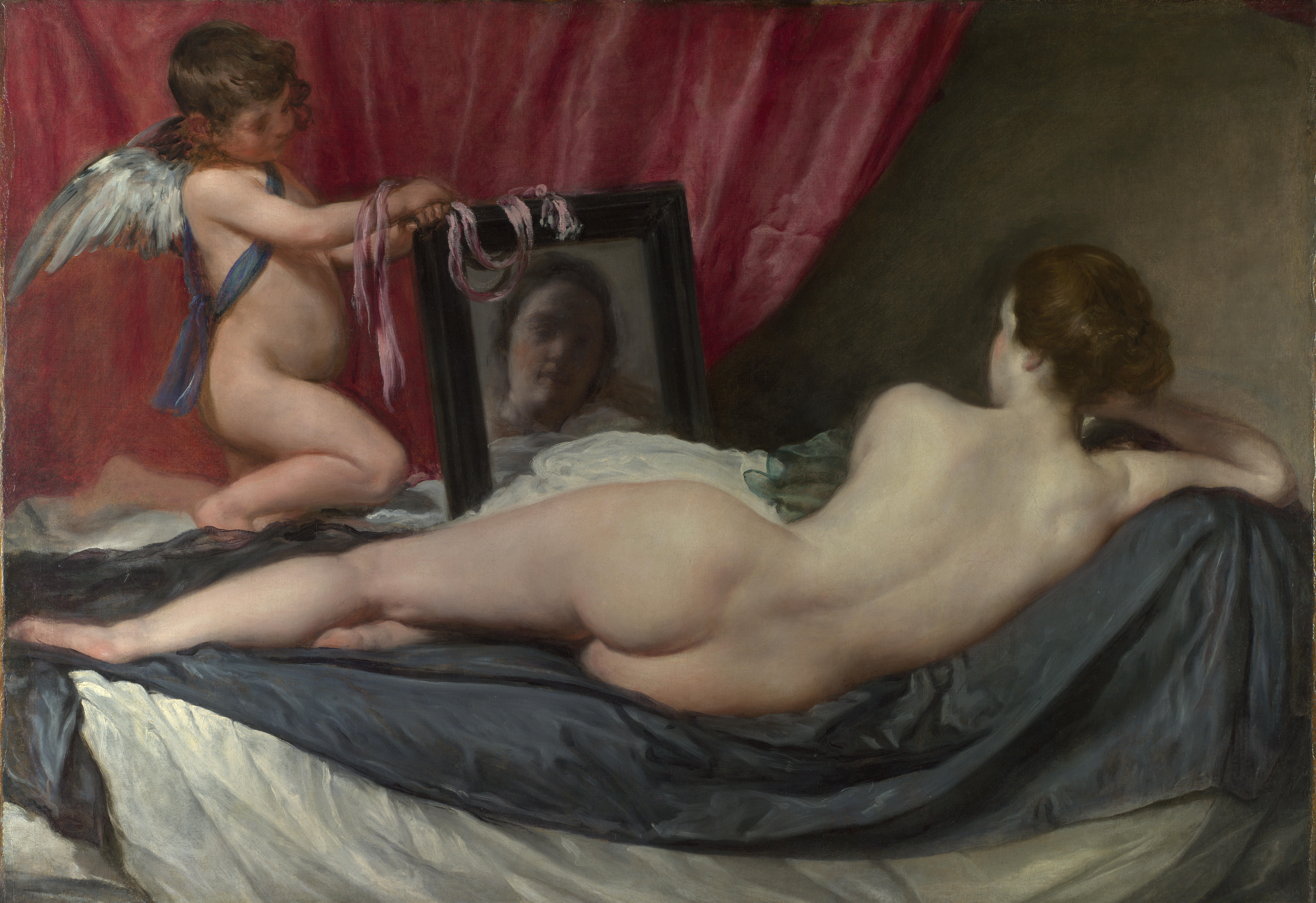
Rokeby Venus, c. 1647–51. 122cm x 177 cm (48in x 49.7in). National Gallery, London.

It was on the advice of his friend Thomas Lawrence that Morritt bought the Rokeby Venus, for £500 from the dealer William James Buchanan. He was also acquainted with Stewart Rose, Richard Payne Knight, Sir Humphry Davy, and Robert Southey who visited Rokeby in 1812 and 1829. He was elected a member of the Dilettanti Society on 2 June 1799, and his portrait as "arch-master" of its ceremonies, in the long crimson taffety-tasselled robe of office, was painted by Sir Martin Archer Shee for the society in 1831–2.

Morritt was one of the founders and a member of the first committee of the Travellers' Club, in 1819. Sir William Fraser mentioned him as a brilliant raconteur.

== Death ==
Morritt died at Rokeby Park, 12 July 1843, aged 71. He had married, by special licence, at the house of Colonel Thomas Stanley, M.P., in Pall Mall, on 19 November 1803, Katharine (died 1815), second daughter of the Rev. Thomas Stanley, rector of Winwick in Lancashire. He was buried by his wife's side in a vault under Rokeby Church, where a marble tablet, surmounted by a bust of him, was placed in their memory.

== Works ==
When Jacob Bryant argued that no such city as Troy had existed, Morritt's local knowledge of Turkey led him publish A Vindication of Homer and of the Ancient Poets and Historians who have recorded the Siege and Fall of Troy (1798). This produced from Bryant Some Observations in 1799, and when William Vincent reviewed Morritt's work in the British Critic early in 1799, and issued the criticisms in a separate form, Bryant rushed into print with Expostulation addressed to the "British Critic" (1799). Morritt retaliated with Additional Remarks on the Topography of Troy, in answer to Mr. Bryant's last Publications (1800). An account of his expedition to Troy was given by Dallaway in Constantinople, with Excursions to the Shores and Islands of the Archipelago, and to the Troad (1797), and his opinions were supported in Remarks and Observations on the Plain of Troy, made during an Excursion in June 1799, by William Francklin.

In 1810 Morritt published a pamphlet on the state of parties, Advice to the Whigs, by an Englishman. In 1826 he gave Sir Walter Scott a copy of a printed Letter to Richard Bethell, in favour of Catholic emancipation; Scott noted in his diary that twenty years previously Morritt had entertained other views. Replies to this letter were published by the Rev. William Metcalfe of Kirk Hammerton, and Henry Hall.

An essay by Morritt on the History and Principles of Antient Sculpture formed the introduction to the second volume of Specimens of Antient Sculpture preserved in Great Britain issued by the Dilettanti Society in 1835. A volume of Miscellaneous Translations and Imitations of the Minor Greek Poets was published by him in 1802. He composed the inscription on the monument in York Minster to William Burgh. His widow left him a miniature of John Thurloe (but then thought to be of John Milton), painted by Samuel Cooper.

== Notes ==
Attribution

This article incorporates text from a publication now in the public domain: Courtney, William Prideaux (1894). "Morritt, John Bacon Sawrey". In Lee, Sidney (ed.). Dictionary of National Biography. Vol. 39. London: Smith, Elder & Co.

Parliament of Great Britain
Preceded by William Tatton; Napier Christie Burton	Member of Parliament for Beverley; 1799–1800; With: Napier Christie Burton	Succeeded by Parliament of the United Kingdom
Parliament of the United Kingdom
Preceded by Parliament of Great Britain	Member of Parliament for Beverley; 1801–1802; With: Napier Christie Burton	Succeeded by Napier Christie Burton; John Wharton
Preceded by Henry Peirse; Viscount Lascelles	Member of Parliament for Northallerton; 1814–1818; With: Henry Peirse	Succeeded by Henry Peirse; Viscount Lascelles
Preceded by Charles Wetherell; Edward Kerrison	Member of Parliament for Shaftesbury; 1818–1820; With: Henry John Shepherd	Succeeded by Edward Harbord; Abraham Moore
Honorary titles
Preceded by Henry Cholmley	High Sheriff of Yorkshire; 1806–1807	Succeeded by Richard Fountayne Wilson
