= Boucherett =

Boucherett is a surname. Notable people with the surname include:

- Ayscoghe Boucherett (1755–1815), British landowner, businessman and politician
- Jessie Boucherett (1825–1905), English campaigner for women's rights
