= Christopher Sykes =

Christopher Sykes may refer to:

- Christopher Sykes (writer) (1907–1986), English author
- Christopher Sykes (politician) (1831–1898), English Conservative politician
- Sir Christopher Sykes, 2nd Baronet (1749–1801), English Tory politician and MP for Beverley
