= Robert Vyner =

Robert Vyner may refer to:

- Sir Robert Vyner, 1st Baronet, (1631–1688), lord mayor of London, 1674–1675
- Robert Vyner (1686–1777), member of parliament (MP) for Great Grimsby, 1710–1713, and for Lincolnshire, 1724–1761
- Robert Vyner (1717–1799), MP for Okehampton, 1754–1761, and for Lincoln, 1774–1784
- Robert Vyner (1762–1810), MP for Lincolnshire, 1794–1802
