= Sir Gilbert Heathcote, 4th Baronet =

British politician

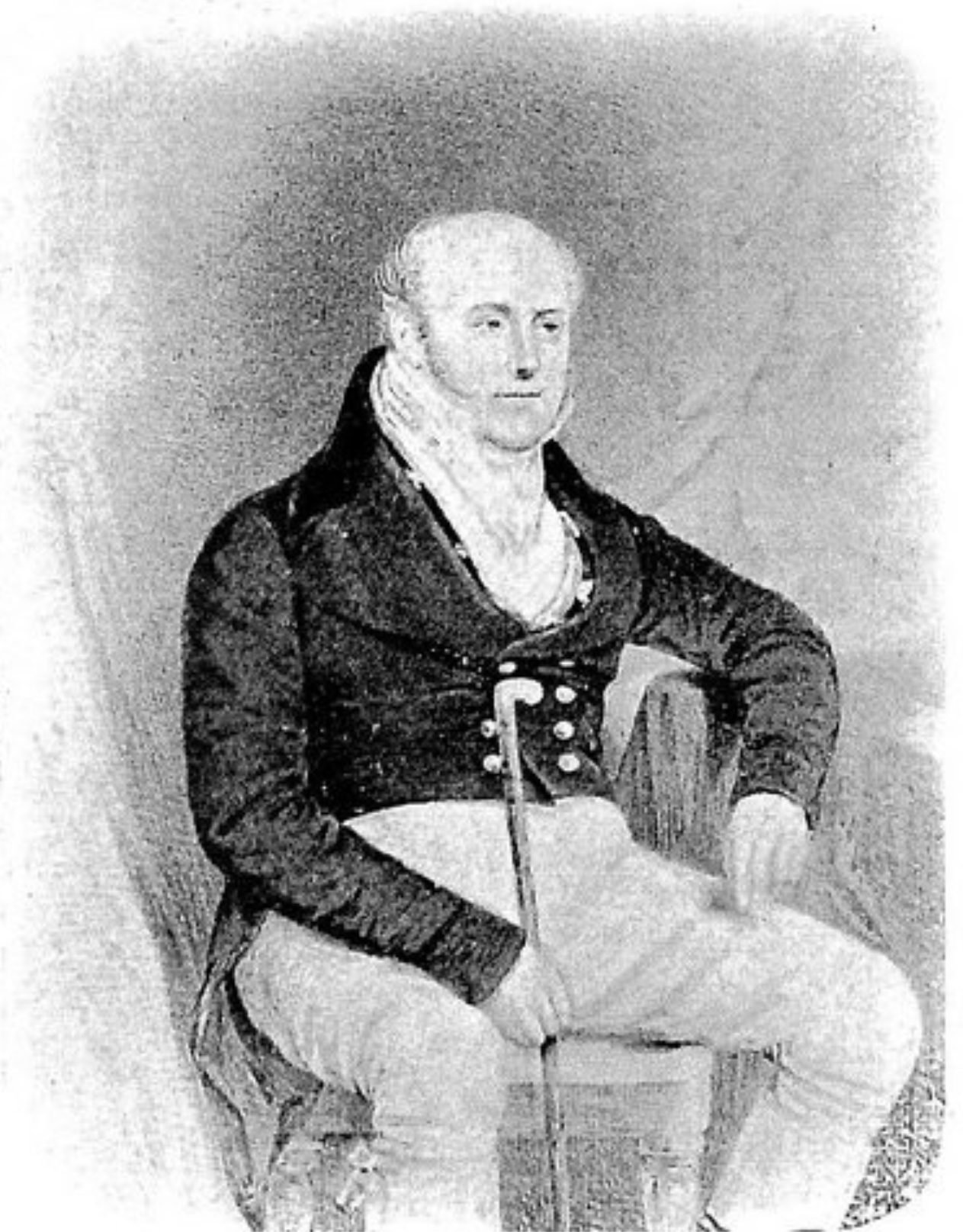
Portrait

Sir Gilbert Heathcote, 4th Baronet (6 October 1773 – 26 March 1851) of Normanton Park, Rutland, was a British Member of Parliament.

Heathcote was the son of Sir Gilbert Heathcote, 3rd Baronet, by his second wife Elizabeth, daughter of Robert Hudson. He succeeded as fourth Baronet on his father's death in 1785.

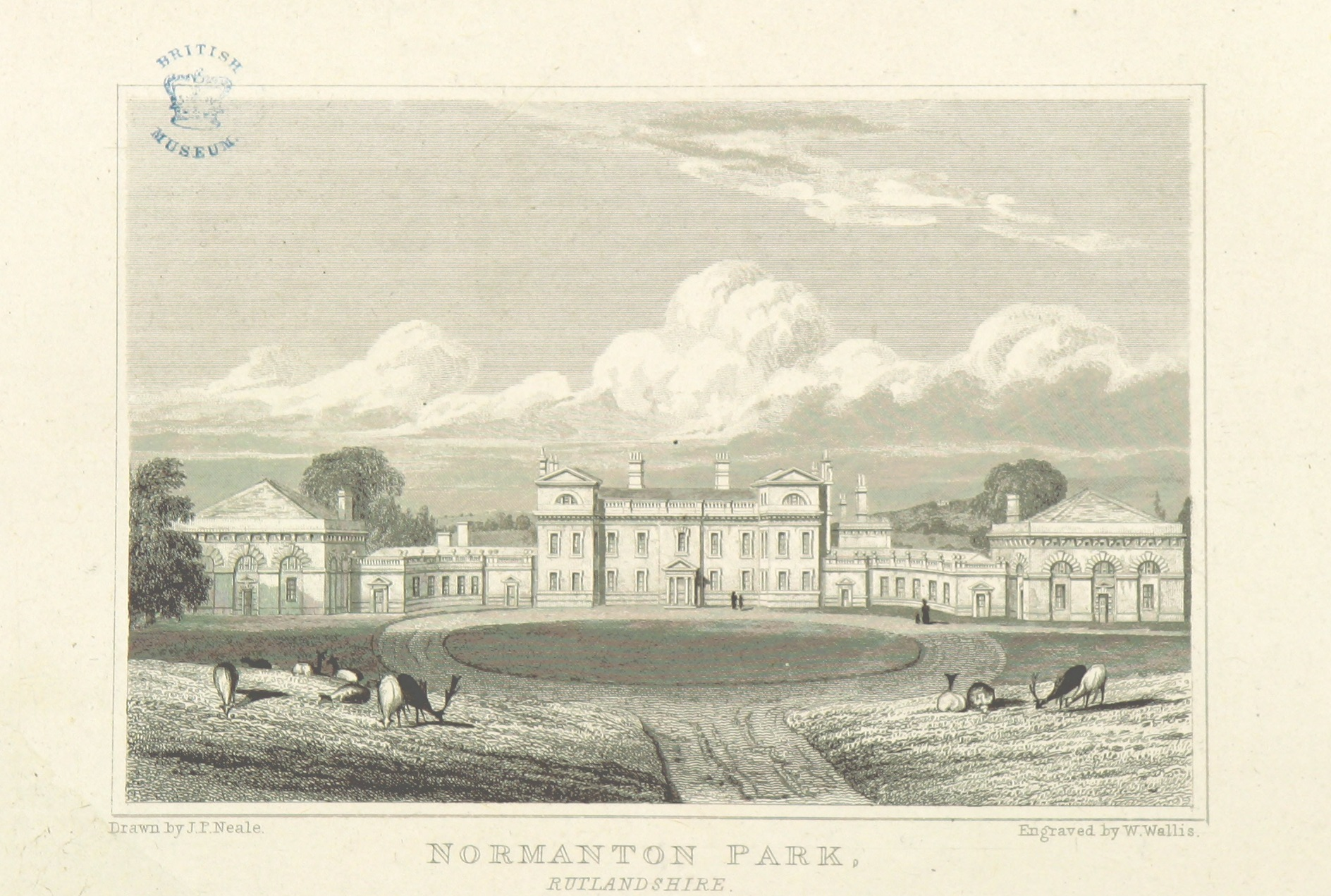
Normanton Park (1818) by John Preston Neale

His principal seat was Normanton Park where he held considerable property, augmented by further large holdings north of the Grimsthorpe Estate in Kesteven.

In 1795 he was appointed High Sheriff of Rutland and in 1796 he was elected to the House of Commons for Lincolnshire as a Whig, a seat he held until 1807, before representing Rutland from 1812 to 1841.

Heathcote married firstly Lady Katherine Sophia Manners, eldest daughter of John Manners and Louisa, Countess of Dysart, in 1793. After his first wife's death in 1825 he remarried the same year. Heathcote died in March 1851, aged 77, and was succeeded in the baronetcy by his son, Gilbert, who in 1856 was elevated to the peerage as Baron Aveland.

Heathcote was for many years a senior steward of Epsom Downs Racecourse, which adjoined his home at The Durdans. His horse Amato won The Derby in 1838.

Parliament of Great Britain
Preceded by Sir John Thorold, Bt; Robert Vyner	Member of Parliament for Lincolnshire; 1796–1801; With: Robert Vyner	Succeeded by Parliament of the United Kingdom
Parliament of the United Kingdom
Preceded by Parliament of Great Britain	Member of Parliament for Lincolnshire; 1801–1807; With: Robert Vyner 1801–1802; Charles Chaplin 1802–1807	Succeeded by Charles Chaplin; Charles Anderson-Pelham
Preceded by Hon. Charles Noel; The Lord Henniker	Member of Parliament for Rutland; 1812–1841; With: Charles Noel 1812–1814; Sir Gerard Noel, Bt 1814–1838; Hon. William Noel 1838–1840; Hon. Charles Noel 1840–1841	Succeeded by Gilbert Heathcote; Hon. William Dawnay
Baronetage of Great Britain
Preceded by Gilbert Heathcote	Baronet (of the City of London); 1785–1851	Succeeded by Gilbert John Heathcote
