= George Tufnell =

British politician

George Forster Tufnell (1723–1798), was a British politician who sat in the House of Commons in two parliaments between 1761 and 1780.

Tufnell was the son of Samuel Tufnell MP of Monken Hadley, Hertfordshire and Langleys, Essex and his wife Elizabeth Cressener, daughter of George Cressener of Earl's Colne, Essex. He married firstly Elizabeth Forster daughter of Richard Forster of Forest, county Dublin on 11 February 1744. They were divorced by Act of Parliament on 9 June 1758.

Tufnell succeeded his brother John Jolliffe Tufnell as Member of Parliament for Beverley in the 1761 general election. In 1767 he made a second marriage to Mary Farhill, daughter of John Farhill of Chichester, Sussex. He did not stand in 1768, but he contested Beverley again at the by-election of 1772. He was beaten by large majority as apparently he only declared himself a candidate shortly before the poll began. However, in the 1774 general election he was elected MP for Beverley with a comfortable majority. In 1779 he planned to stand in a by-election at Middlesex, but was not allowed to resign. He did not stand at the general election of 1780.

Tufnell died on 10 July 1798. His son, William, later served as MP for Colchester.

Parliament of Great Britain
Preceded by John Tufnell; Sir William Codrington, Bt	Member of Parliament for Beverley; 1761–1768; With: Michael Newton	Succeeded by Hugh Bethell; Charles Anderson-Pelham
Preceded by Sir Griffith Boynton, Bt; Charles Anderson-Pelham	Member of Parliament for Beverley; 1774–1780; With: Sir James Pennyman, Bt	Succeeded by Francis Evelyn Anderson; Sir James Pennyman, Bt
