= Charles Anderson-Pelham, 1st Earl of Yarborough =

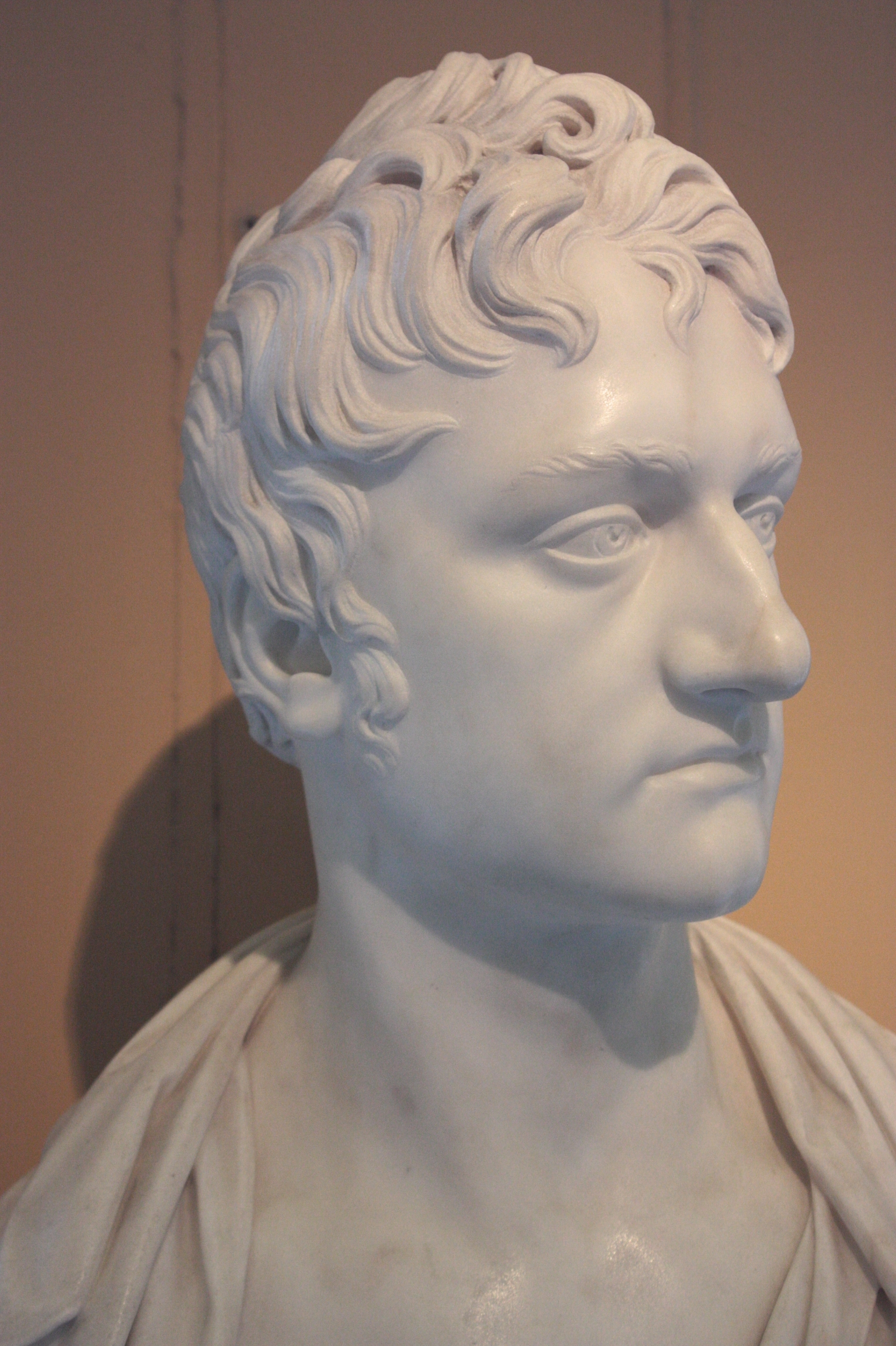
Charles Pelham, 1st Earl of Yarborough, by Joseph Nollekens, 1808, Victoria and Albert Museum

Charles Anderson-Pelham, 1st Earl of Yarborough (8 August 1781 – 5 September 1846), styled Hon. Charles Anderson-Pelham from 1794 to 1823, was one of the founders of the Royal Yacht Squadron and its first Commodore. He lived at Appuldurcombe House on the Isle of Wight, which had been inherited by his wife Henrietta from her uncle, Sir Richard Worsley. He died aboard his yacht at Vigo in Spain in 1846. There are two monuments to him: one at Culver Down on the Isle of Wight and Pelham's Pillar at Caistor, Lincolnshire, England.

He was member of parliament (MP) for Great Grimsby from 1803 until his re-election in 1807 was overturned on petition in 1808, and for Lincolnshire from 1807 to 1823.

His younger son, Dudley Pelham, was a naval commander and politician.

Coat of arms of Charles Anderson-Pelham, 1st Earl of Yarborough
Coronet A coronet of an Earl Crest 1st, a peacock in pride, argent (Pelham); 2nd, a water-spaniel dog, or (Anderson). Escutcheon Quarterly; 1st and 4th grand quarters, quarterly, 1st and 4th azure, three pelicans argent, vulning themselves; 2nd and 3rd gules, two pieces of belts, with buckles erect in pale, the buckles upwards argent (Pelham); 2nd and 3rd grand quarters argent, a chevron between three crosses-flory sable (Anderson). Supporters Dexter: a bay-horse, regardant, charged on the body with three antique buckles, in bend sinister or; sinister, a water-spaniel dog, regardant, or, charged on the body with three crosses-flory in bend sable. Motto Vincit amor patriae

Parliament of the United Kingdom
Preceded by Ayscoghe Boucherett; William Mellish	Member of Parliament for Great Grimsby; July 1803 – 1808; With: William Mellish to 1806; George Anderson-Pelham 1806–07; William Ellice from 1807	Succeeded by John Henry Loft; William Ellice
Preceded by Sir Gilbert Heathcote; Charles Chaplin	Member of Parliament for Lincolnshire; 1807–1823; With: Charles Chaplin 1807–1816; William Cust 1816–1818; Charles Chaplin 1818–1823	Succeeded by Sir William Amcotts-Ingilby; Charles Chaplin
Honorary titles
Preceded by The Earl of Malmesbury	Vice-Admiral of Hampshire; 1831–1846	Vacant
Peerage of the United Kingdom
New creation	Earl of Yarborough; 1837–1846	Succeeded by Charles Anderson-Pelham
Peerage of Great Britain
Preceded by Charles Anderson-Pelham	Baron Yarborough; 1823–1846	Succeeded by Charles Anderson-Pelham
