= William Mellish (banker) =

British politician and banker (1764–1838)

William Mellish (1764–1838) was an English Tory politician and banker.

He was born in the City of Westminster on 13 June 1764, the third son of William Mellish of Blyth, Nottinghamshire by his second wife Anne Gore, daughter and co-heiress of John Gore of Bush Hill Park, Enfield, London.

In 1794 Mellish inherited Bush Hill Park from his aunt, Catherine Mellish (née Gore), widow of Joseph Mellish.

With his brother John, he owned the business of John and William Mellish & Co. Having served as a director and Deputy Governor, Mellish was made Governor of the Bank of England from 1814 to 1816.

He was elected Member of Parliament (MP) for Great Grimsby from 1796 to 1802 and from 1803 to 1806, then as MP for Middlesex from 1806 to 1820.

Mellish died at his residence on Bishopsgate Street, London on 8 June 1838, aged 73, and was buried at All Saints' Church, Edmonton. He never married. After his death, the proceeds of his estates were divided between his nephews and nieces.

Parliament of Great Britain
| Preceded by Dudley Long; John Harrison | Member of Parliament for Great Grimsby; 1796–1800; With: Ayscoghe Boucherett | Succeeded by Parliament of the United Kingdom |
Parliament of the United Kingdom
| Preceded by Parliament of Great Britain | Member of Parliament for Great Grimsby; 1801–1802; With: Ayscoghe Boucherett | Succeeded by John Henry Loft; Ayscoghe Boucherett |
| Preceded by John Henry Loft; Ayscoghe Boucherett | Member of Parliament for Great Grimsby; 1803–1806; With: Ayscoghe Boucherett to July 1803; Charles Anderson-Pelham from July 1803 | Succeeded by Charles Anderson-Pelham; George Anderson-Pelham |
| Preceded by George Boulton Mainwaring; George Byng | Member of Parliament for Middlesex; 1806–1820; With: George Byng | Succeeded by Samuel Charles Whitbread; George Byng |
