= Ayscoghe Boucherett =

British politician (1755–1815)

Lieutenant-Colonel Ayscoghe Boucherett JP DL
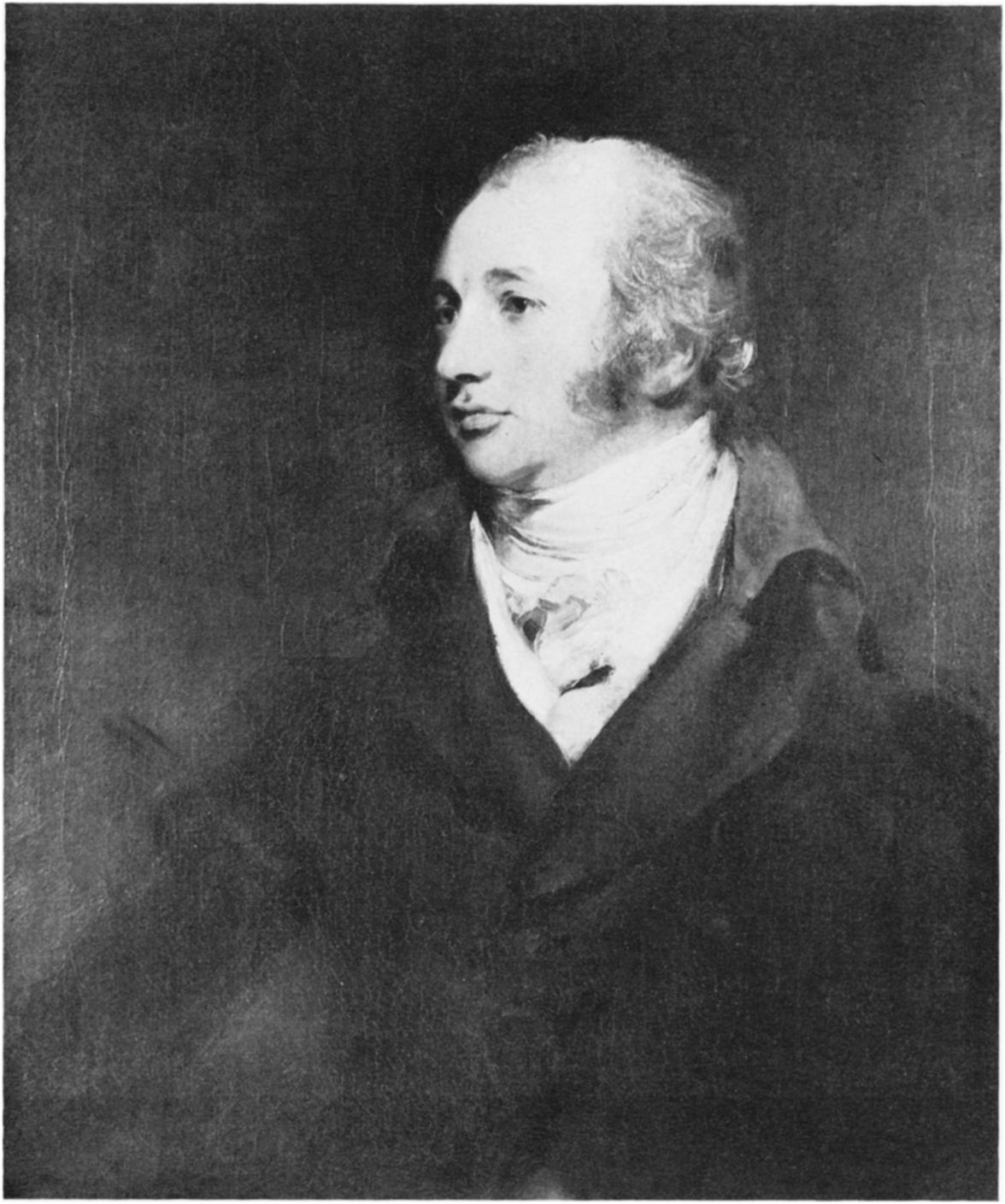
- Portrait by Thomas Lawrence, c. 1795

Member of Parliament for Grimsby
- In office 1796–1803 Serving with William Mellish (1796–1802) and John Henry Loft (1802–1803)
- Preceded by: John Harrison; Dudley North
- Succeeded by: Charles Anderson Pelham; John Henry Loft

Personal details
- Born: 16 April 1755
- Died: 15 September 1815 (aged 60)
- Spouse: Emelia Crockatt (m. 1789)
- Children: 4

Lieutenant-Colonel Ayscoghe Boucherett JP DL (/ˈæskju/; 16 April 1755 – 15 September 1815) was a British landowner, businessman and politician who served as Member of Parliament (MP) for Great Grimsby from 1796 to 1803.

Born into a family of the Lincolnshire landed gentry, Boucherett became involved in local politics in Lincolnshire, and (owing mainly to his marriage) with artistic and mercantile circles in London. He was the chairman of the Grimsby Haven Company, which oversaw the reopening and expansion of Grimsby's first dock. He was a friend of the artist Sir Thomas Lawrence and the proprietor of Willingham, Lincolnshire, where he constructed his country seat, Willingham House, in 1790. For his investment in the Haven Company, he received the support of Lord Yarborough, one of its main investors and a principal land-owner in Grimsby; owing largely to Lord Yarborough's patronage, Boucherett was returned as the MP for that borough at the 1796 election. He was not a frequent voter, but used his position to further the interests of his corporation. Nonetheless, the company met with financial difficulties after it opened the Harbour in 1800. In 1803, Boucherett resigned his seat in favour of Yarborough's heir and pursued a quieter political life. He died in a carriage accident in 1815.

== Early life and family connections ==
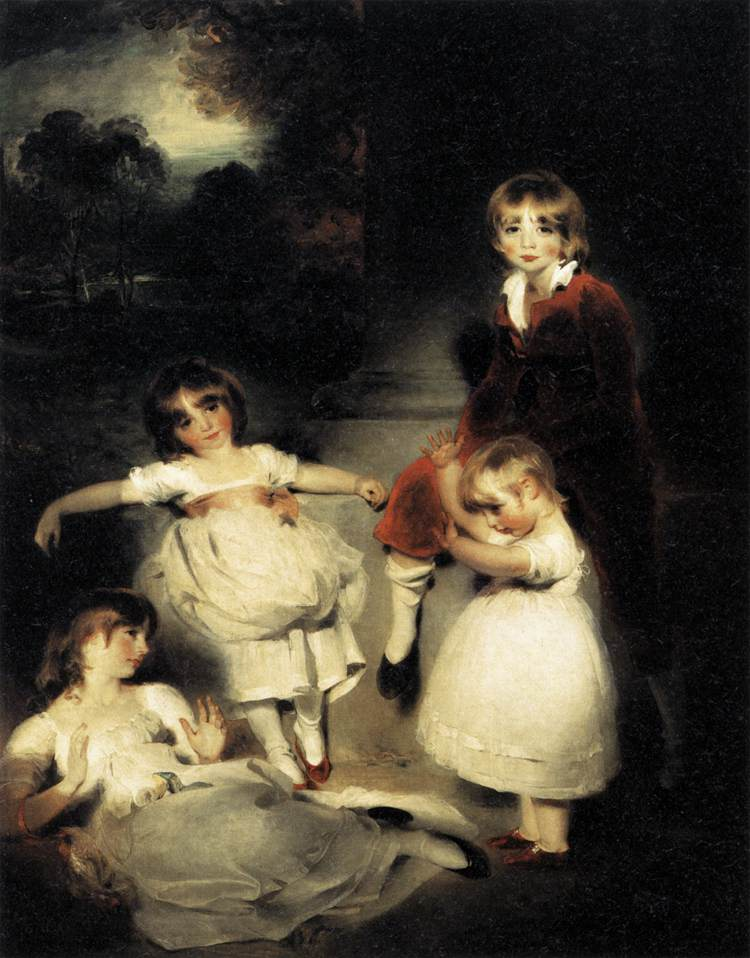
The Children of Ayscoghe Boucherett by Thomas Lawrence, c. 1808

Boucherett was born on 16 April 1755, the son of Ayscoghe Boucherett of Willingham and Stallingborough, Lincolnshire, and his wife, Mary White. The elder Boucherett had been the High Sheriff of Lincolnshire in 1754, and was a landed gentleman in Lincolnshire, whose family was descended from Huguenot merchants; they married into the Ayscoghe family and inherited the Willingham estate through this marriage. The elder Boucherett's daughter, Mary, had married Michael Barne of Sotterley, Suffolk, an army officer and a member of parliament for Dunwich.

The younger Boucherett was admitted at Queens' College, Cambridge, in 1773, aged 18, but did not take a degree. He married, on 17 March 1789, Emelia Crockatt, daughter of Charles Crockatt, a merchant, of London and of Luxborough Hall, Essex, and his wife, Anna Muilman, (Note: Thomas Gainsborough painted a group portrait (including Crockatt and Muilman's brother) which is thought to have been commissioned to celebrate their engagement. For further details of this portrait and their families, see "Peter Darnell Muilman, Charles Crockatt and William Keable in a Landscape, c. 1750, Thomas Gainsborough (Summary)". Tate. Retrieved 2 November 2014.) who married, when widowed, the insurance broker and art connoisseur John Julius Angerstein. This union helped the younger Boucherett to garner connexions in London merchant circles. Emilia Boucherett died on 5 February 1837, aged 75. The Boucheretts had one son and three daughters:

- Emilia Mary Boucherett (7 August 1790 – 29 November 1870). Died unmarried.
- Ayscoghe Boucherett, J.P., D.L. (24 September 1791 – 1857), he was High Sheriff of Lincolnshire in 1820. He married, on 11 May 1816, Louisa Pigou, daughter of Frederick John Pigou of Dartford, Kent, and his wife Louisa, née Minchin. They had: Ayscoghe Boucherett (1817–32), Henry Robert Boucherett, J.P. (1818–77), who was High Sheriff of Lincolnshire in 1866, Hugo Boucherett (1819 – c. 1839), Louisa Boucherett (1821–95), and Emilia Jessie Boucherett (1825–1905), who was a noted women's rights campaigner.
- Maria Boucherett (born 30 October 1795). She married, on 15 August 1815, Charles Parker Newdigate Newdegate of Harefield, Middlesex; their only child was the Conservative politician and Member of Parliament for North Warwickshire, Charles Newdigate Newdegate.
- Juliana Boucherett (bapt. 27 April 1798). Died unmarried.

Boucherett paid for the construction of a new family seat in 1790; Willingham House was a larger and grander mansion than the family's previous seat closer to Willingham, and was constructed in the neoclassical style, most likely by Robert Mitchell, two miles west of the earlier house.

== Friendship with Sir Thomas Lawrence ==
The family's connection with the art connoisseur John Julius Angerstein led to them becoming acquainted with certain artistic circles in the late eighteenth century; most notably, they established a close friendship with the portrait painter Sir Thomas Lawrence, who would go on to be President of the Royal Academy. He visited Willingham House, the Boucherett family's country home, composing a number of studies in pastel of Boucherett's young children, beginning in 1793. The Boucherett family were also painted several times by Lawrence; he painted a group portrait of Emilia Boucherett, and her two eldest children, Ayscoghe and Emilia Maria, alongside Mrs Boucherett's half-sister, Juliana Angerstein; another group portrait, The Children of Ayscoghe Boucherett, depicting the four children of Boucherett and his wife, (painted in 1808 and now held in the Louvre Museum), has been described as "one of Lawrence's most celebrated group portraits". A separate study of the three daughters, Emilia Mary, Maria and Juliana, was sold by the auction house Christie's in 2012 for £121,000.

== Member of Parliament and public service ==
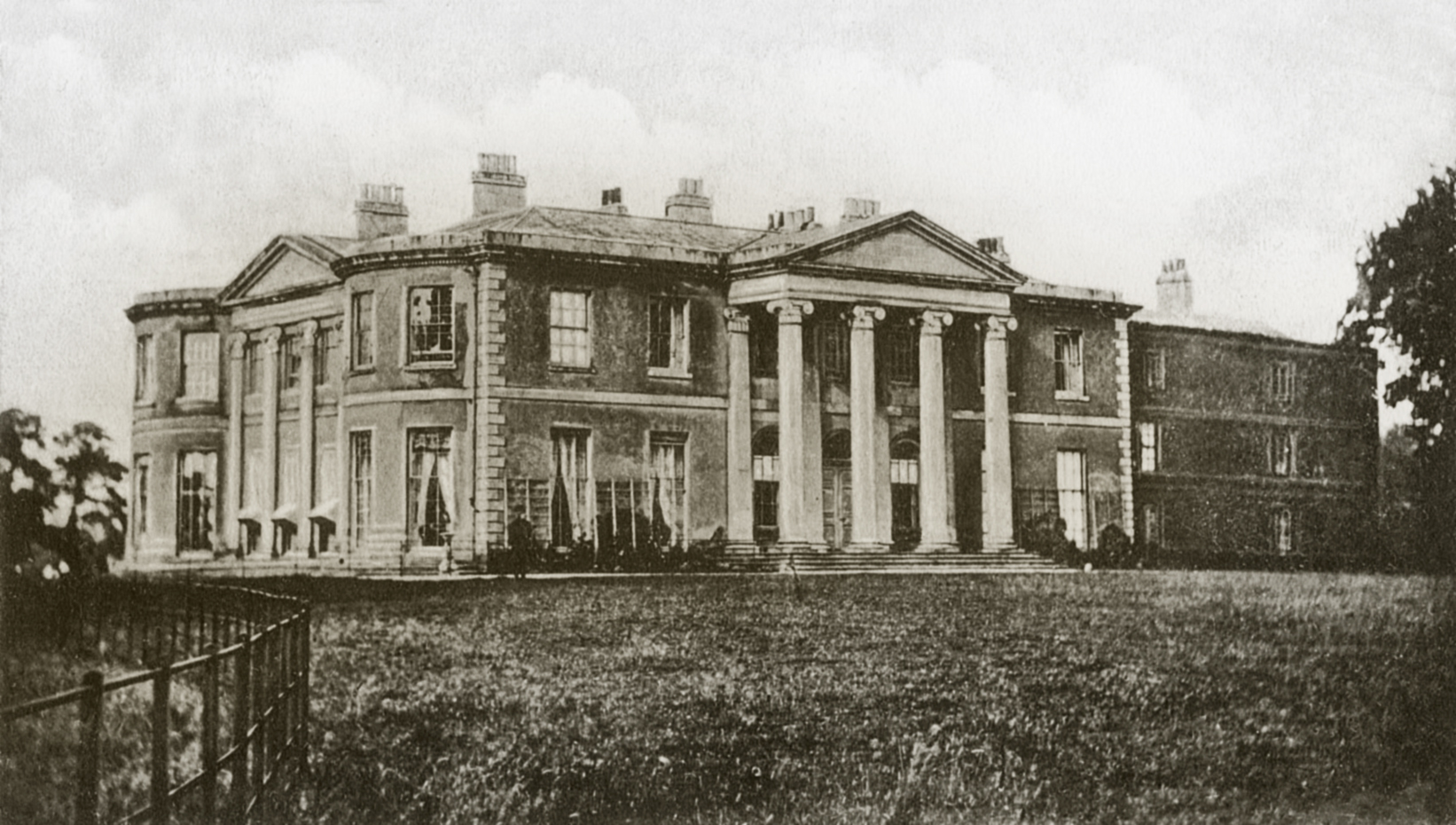
Willingham House, Lincolnshire

In the 1790s, Boucherett began to rise through Lincolnshire's civic and mercantile circles, especially in the north of the County, where the family had their seat; his connexions helped him to become involved with a group of businessmen planning to reopen and expand Grimsby's harbour. His rise is charted in his appointments to several civic posts: to be High Steward of Grimsby from 1794 (he remained as such until his death), succeeding Christopher Clayton, and to be High Sheriff of Lincolnshire for 1795–6. As these plans for the harbour came to fruition, he was appointed chairman of the company tasked with performing the required work; it was the Grimsby Haven Company, which was created by an Act of Parliament, the Great Grimsby (Lincoln) Harbour Act 1796 (36 Geo. 3. c. 98) for the express purpose of building the dock and repairing the haven. He secured the friendship and patronage of Charles Anderson Pelham, 1st Baron Yarborough, a prominent local land-owner involved in the Haven Company, and was returned as the Member of Parliament for Great Grimsby in 1796 owing to this friendship.

Yarborough, Boucherett's patron, was an opponent of the administration of William Pitt the Younger and supported the Duke of Portland during the 1790s. Boucherett was an infrequent voter, but he told the diarist Joseph Farington that, when he did vote, he tended to do so with Charles James Fox, rather than Pitt the Younger, although, he later became "disgusted" at Fox's style of opposition; he is also known to have voted against the Ferrol Expedition in 1801. The seat did allow for him to further the interests of the Haven Company, with him proposing a bill to grant more funds in 1799. He found, though, that his funds and the financial success of the company were both in decline by 1801. Although re-elected in 1802, the following year he resigned in favour of Lord Yarborough's eldest son and heir, the Hon. Charles Anderson Pelham, later 1st Earl and 2nd Baron Yarborough.

== Later life ==
Although opened in 1800 at the cost of £100,000, the new harbour at Grimsby failed to attract the levels of trade the company had projected, caused largely by a lack of inland transport networks. The financial problems facing the Grimsby Haven Company led to factions and difficulty in its running and put strain on Boucherett's relations with Yarborough; having invested much money and time in the now failing company, Boucherett also found it draining of him financially.

Aside from Parliamentary and business commitments, he served as a Deputy Lieutenant for Lincolnshire and a Justice of the Peace. Boucherett was also High Sheriff of Lincolnshire in 1795 and an officer in the Yeoman volunteers, being a Captain the Market Raisen Yeomanry in 1798 and then a Lieutenant-Colonel in and Commandant of the North Lincolnshire Yeomanry from 1814 until his death. He died in a carriage accident on 15 September 1815. At his death, his assets barely covered the debts he had accrued in his lifetime. He was succeeded as the High Steward of Grimsby by the Hon. George Anderson Pelham, the second son of the first Lord Yarborough.

Parliament of Great Britain
Preceded by John Harrison; Dudley North	Member of Parliament for Great Grimsby; 1796–1803; With: William Mellish 1796–1802; John Henry Loft 1802–1803	Succeeded by Hon. Charles Anderson Pelham; John Henry Loft
Other offices
Preceded by Sir Joseph Banks, Bt.	High Sheriff of Lincolnshire; 1795–1796	Succeeded by Sir William Earle Welby, Bt.
Preceded by Christopher Clayton	High Steward of Grimsby; 1794–1812	Succeeded by Hon. George Anderson Pelham
