= Charles Chaplin (elder) =

British politician (1759–1816)

Charles Chaplin (30 May 1759 – 28 August 1816) was an English member of parliament (MP). A graduate of St John's College, Cambridge, Chaplin was the brother-in-law of Lord George Manners-Sutton, who married Chaplin's only sister Diana.

He was appointed high sheriff of Lincolnshire in 1785. He was one of the two MPs for Lincolnshire from 1802 until his death in 1816, aged 57.

Parliament of the United Kingdom
Preceded by Sir Gilbert Heathcote and Robert Vyner	Member of parliament for Lincolnshire; 1802–1816; With: Sir Gilbert Heathcote, to 1807; Charles Anderson-Pelham, from 1807	Succeeded by Charles Anderson-Pelham and William Cust
