= Willingham House =

Former country house in Lincolnshire, England

Coordinates: 53°22′52″N 0°17′02″W

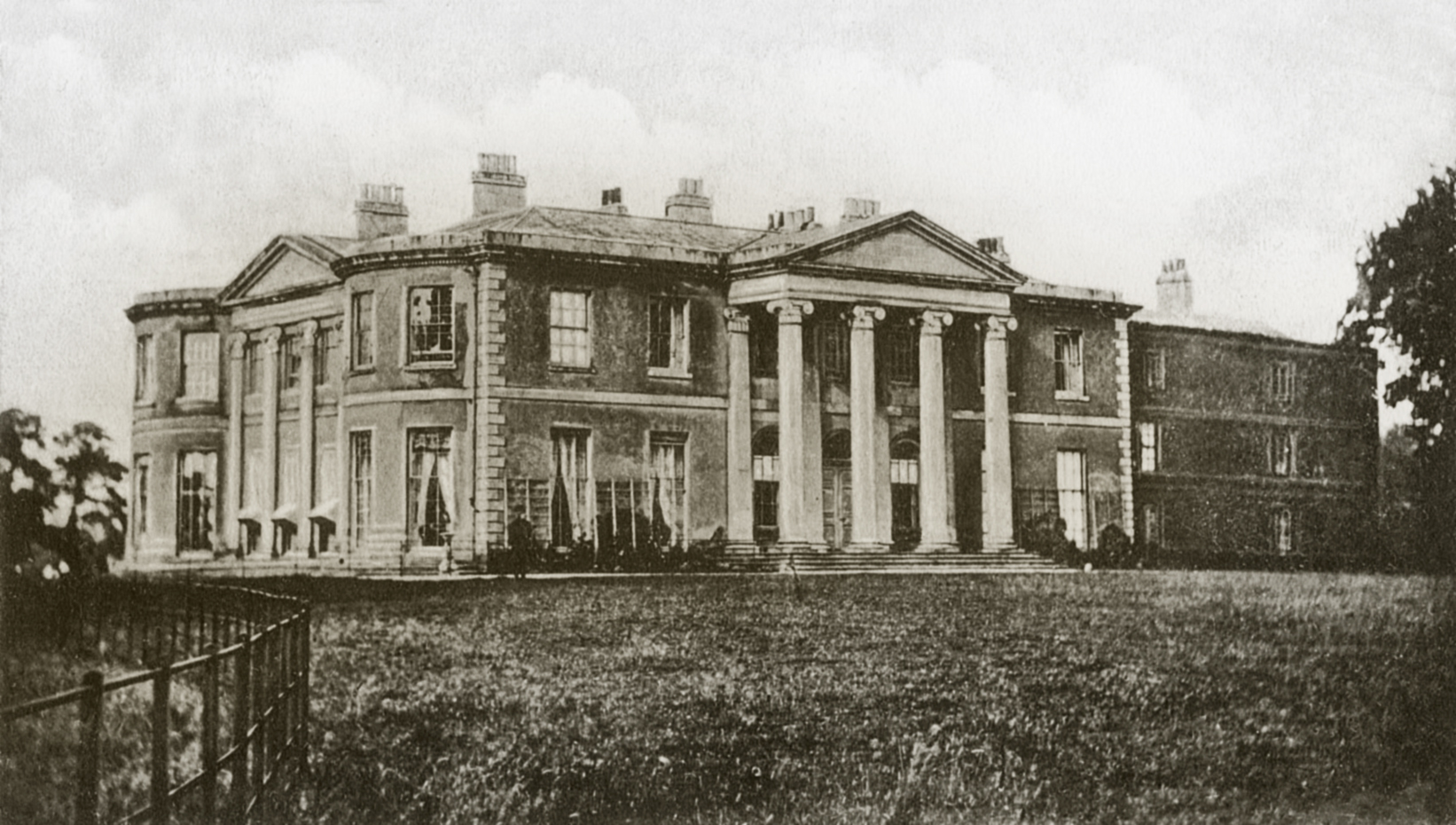
Willingham House

Willingham House was a country house in North Willingham (near Market Rasen), Lincolnshire, England.

It was built around 1790 for Ayscoghe Boucherett and is attributed to the architect Robert Mitchell (a similar building design can be seen in the engraving Selwood Park (Silwood Park), in the County of Berkshire, the Seat of James Sibbald Esqr - designed 1788). The Boucherett family were regularly painted by Sir Thomas Lawrence, P.R.A. (1769–1830) who is believed to have visited the house to undertake a series of sketches of the children over a period of around five years.

Unusual for a very large house of this period, Willingham House could be viewed easily from the main road, from Market Rasen to Louth. The small lake in front of the house still remains, although now obscured by mature trees from the main road.

== Demolition ==
Willingham House was blown up at 2 pm on 7 June 1967 by explosives set by the Royal Engineers following years of neglect. The roof timbers were suffering from wood beetle which was making the building unstable. There was little appreciation of the heritage of the 1790 building by the local authorities, perhaps surprisingly for a county, noted for its conservation of ecclesiastical architecture since the 18th century. However, the house had been a prison camp during and following the Second World War, then a Ministry of Defence training camp and was unlikely to be taken on again by a family. The repair costs outweighed conversion costs and the feeling was that something should be done rather than leave a dangerous ruin unattended. To avoid the hazard of collapse (and for economical reasons) after a careful demolition and salvage operation, the decision was taken to use dynamite. To ensure complete destruction the portico had its pillars loaded with explosives to do the job, thus reducing the remains to nothing more than land-fill. The beautiful wrought iron stair rails are thought to have been taken away for their scrap value, not having any practical use for anything else at that time. The decorative plastered ceilings and walls were all destroyed. Very few images survive of the interior, or the back of the hall, which was made up of the service buildings and stables (3/4 of the total building area). Remnants of some of the out-buildings survive today in what is now an industrial park.
