= Robert Vyner (1762–1810) =

English politician

Member of Parliament for Lincolnshire
- In office 1794–1802 Serving with Sir John Thorold, Bt, Sir Gilbert Heathcote, Bt
- Preceded by: Charles Anderson-Pelham; Sir John Thorold, Bt
- Succeeded by: Charles Chaplin; Sir Gilbert Heathcote, Bt

Personal details
- Born: 16 May 1762
- Died: 13 March 1810 (aged 47)
- Spouse: Lady Theodosia Ashburnham (m. 1788)
- Relations: Robert Vyner (grandfather); Charles Anderson-Pelham, 1st Baron Yarborough (half-brother); Francis Evelyn Anderson (half-brother)
- Children: 5
- Parent(s): Robert Vyner; Eleanor Carter Anderson
- Education: Harrow School; St John's College, Cambridge

Robert Vyner (16 May 1762 – 13 March 1810), of Gautby, Lincolnshire, was an English politician who represented Lincolnshire from 1794 to 1802.

== Early life ==
Vyner was born on 16 May 1762. He was the only son of Eleanor (née Carter) Anderson and Robert Vyner, MP for Okehampton, Lincoln, and Thirsk. At the time of his parents' marriage, his mother was the widow of Francis Anderson. From her first marriage, he had at least two half-siblings, including Charles Anderson-Pelham, 1st Baron Yarborough and Francis Evelyn Anderson who both served in Parliament.

His maternal grandfather was Thomas Carter of Redbourne. His paternal grandparents were Robert Vyner of Gautby and Swakeleys, and Margaret Style (a daughter of Sir Thomas Style, 2nd Baronet). His grandfather, who represented Great Grimsby and Lincolnshire in Parliament, inherited Swakeleys and his extensive Lincolnshire estates in 1707 (which had been acquired by his father's great uncle, Sir Robert Vyner, 1st Baronet, who was Charles IIs banker).

He was educated at Harrow from 1774 to 1779 before graduating from St John's College, Cambridge in 1779.

== Career ==
In 1790, Vyner had been expected to stand for Lincoln, but did not do so. He entered Parliament for Lincolnshire in 1794, on the vacancy caused by the elevation of his half-brother Charles Anderson-Pelham to the peerage as Baron Yarborough. His father, who also sought a peerage, assured the Duke of Portland that Vyner was well disposed to government. His competitor for the county seat, Sir Gilbert Heathcote, was not quite of age and he was unopposed. Despite his father's claims, and perhaps because of his disappointment about the peerage, he joined him in opposition. He was spared a contest in 1796, his colleague withdrawing in favour of Heathcote. His father too retired. "He remained in opposition—though silent in the House—voting with them on supply and against the imperial subsidy." In 1797, he was Capt. of the North Lincolnshire Militia.

A member of Brooks's since 1785, but not of the Whig Club, Vyner did not secede with the Foxites. He opposed the land tax redemption bill and voted against ministers on the Irish Rebellion. At the dissolution in 1802, he retired due to the state of his health.

Vyner served as Sheriff of Lincolnshire from 1804 to 1805.

== Personal life ==
On 4 June 1788, Vyner was married to Lady Theodosia Maria Ashburnham (1765–1822), the youngest daughter of John Ashburnham, 2nd Earl of Ashburnham and the former Elizabeth Crowley (a daughter and co-heiress of Alderman John Crowley, of Barking, Suffolk). They were the parents of four sons and one daughter, including:

- Robert Vyner (1789–1872), who died unmarried.
- Theodosia Mary Vyner (1790–1820), who married Samuel Crawley, MP for Honiton and Bedford.
- Charles James Vyner (1797–1837), who died unmarried.
- Henry Vyner (1805–1861), of Newby Hall, who married Lady Mary Gertrude Robinson, a daughter of Henrietta Frances de Grey and Thomas de Grey, 2nd Earl de Grey.
- John Vyner (1807–1825), who died unmarried.

Vyner died 13 March 1810 and was succeeded in his estates by his eldest son Robert, who never married. After Robert's death in 1872, the estates passed to his grandson, Henry Frederick Clare Vyner.

=== Descendants ===
Through his son Henry, he was a grandfather of Henrietta Vyner, who married her cousin, George Robinson, 1st Marquess of Ripon, and Theodosia Vyner, who married Charles Compton, 3rd Marquess of Northampton.

Through his daughter Theodosia, he was a grandfather of Theodosia Sambrooke Crawley (1818–1879), who married Clement, Comte de Mont Real, in 1839.

Parliament of Great Britain
Preceded by Charles Anderson-Pelham; Sir John Thorold, Bt	Member of Parliament for Lincolnshire; 1794–1802; With: Sir John Thorold, Bt 1794-1796; Sir Gilbert Heathcote, Bt 1796-1802	Succeeded by Charles Chaplin; Sir Gilbert Heathcote, Bt
