= George Manners (Scarborough MP) =

British soldier and politician

Captain George Manners (4 June 1747 – 27 June 1772) was a British soldier and politician, the illegitimate son of John Manners, Marquess of Granby and Ann Mompesson.

Manners was enrolled at Eton from 7 July 1757 until 1762. He served as a cornet in the Blues during the Seven Years' War, and became junior captain of the 3rd King's Dragoons on 4 August 1767. In 1768, he was elected as Member of Parliament for Scarborough, a borough frequently in the Manners interest. Manners retired from the Army on 13 August 1771, but continued to represent Scarborough until his death in 1772.

Manners' sister was Anne, the illegitimate daughter of John Manners, Marquess of Granby. She married her first cousin John Manners-Sutton.

Parliament of Great Britain
Preceded by Sir John Major, Bt; Fountayne Wentworth Osbaldeston	Member of Parliament for Scarborough; 1768–1772; With: Fountayne Wentworth Osbaldeston 1768–1770; Sir James Pennyman, Bt 1770–1772	Succeeded by Sir James Pennyman, Bt; The Earl of Tyrconnel
