= Christopher Wilson (bishop) =

Bishop of Bristol

The Right Reverend Christopher Wilson
- Bishop of Bristol
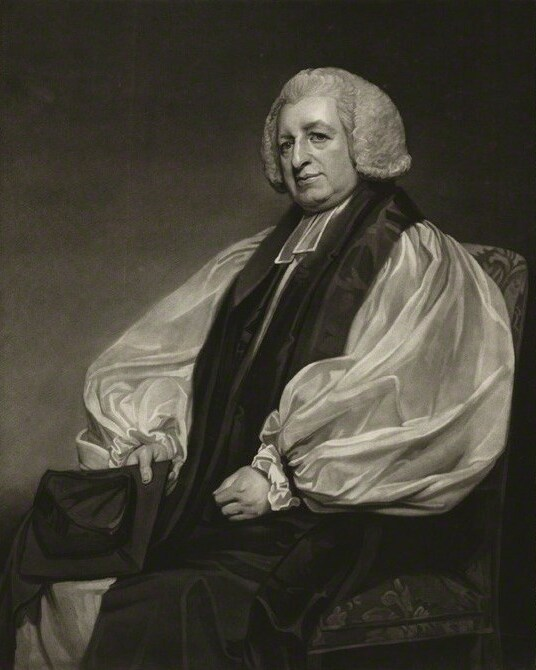
- Diocese: Diocese of Bristol
- Elected: 1783
- Term ended: 1792 (death)
- Predecessor: Lewis Bagot
- Successor: Spencer Madan

Personal details
- Born: c. 1714
- Died: 18 April 1792
- Denomination: Anglican
- Spouse: Anne Gibson
- Education: St Catharine's College, Cambridge

Ordination history of Christopher Wilson
History
Diaconal ordination
- Date: 1 June 1740
- Place: Lincoln
Priestly ordination
- Date: March 1742
- Place: Norwich

Christopher Wilson (c.1714 – 18 April 1792) was an English churchman who served as Bishop of Bristol.

== Biography ==
According to Alumni Cantabrigienses, Christopher Wilson was the son of Richard Wilson, Recorder of Leeds. He was educated at Leeds Grammar School, and was admitted as a pensioner at St Catharine's College, Cambridge on 23 September 1732, and matriculated in 1733. He graduated B.A. 1737, M.A. 1740, D.D. 1753. Wilson served as a Fellow of St Catharine's 1737–1745, and as Proctor 1742–43.

After ordination as a deacon in 1740 and as a priest in 1742, Wilson was appointed Vicar of Coton, Cambridgeshire in 1742, and Prebendary of St Paul's Cathedral in 1745. He served as Rector of Barnes from 1768 until his death, and as Bishop of Bristol from 1783 until his death.

He was married to Anne Gibson, daughter of Dr Edmund Gibson, Bishop of London.

Christopher Wilson died on 18 April 1792, aged 78.

Church of England titles
Preceded by Lewis Bagot	Bishop of Bristol; 1783–1792	Succeeded by Spencer Madan
