= John Henry Loft =

British politician and soldier (1769–1849)

General John Henry Loft
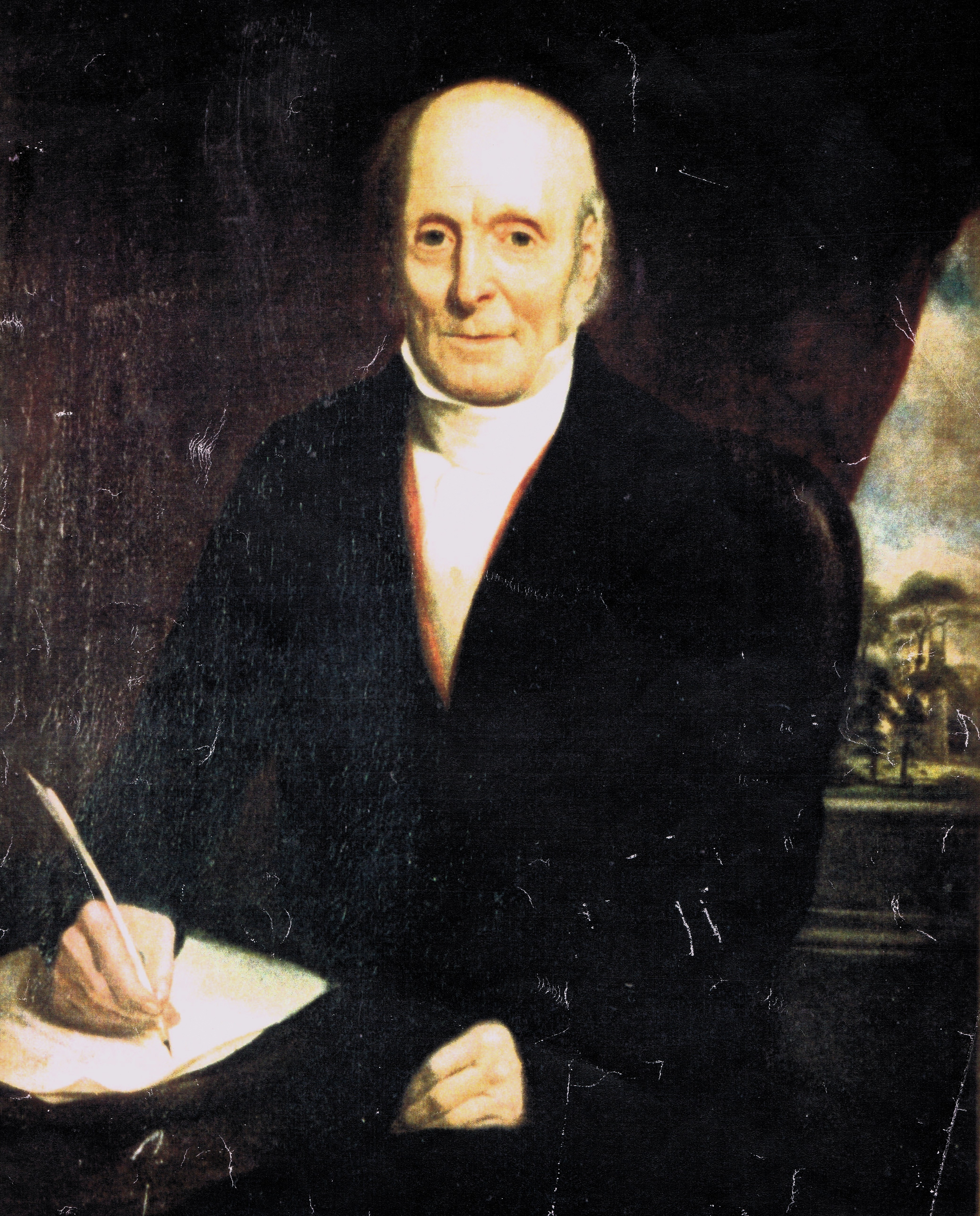
- Portrait of John Henry Loft
- Born: 20 February 1769; Grainthorpe, Lincolnshire, England
- Died: 13 July 1849 (aged 80); Loft Street, Grimsby, Lincolnshire, England
- Burial place: Marshchapel
- Occupation: Soldier
- Known for: Corrupt politics, transcribing Lincolnshire graves
- Spouse: Elizabeth Farr

John Henry Loft (20 February 1769 – 13 July 1849) was a British soldier and politician.

== Early life ==
Loft was born on 20 February 1769, in Grainthorpe, Lincolnshire.

== Military career ==
In 1769, he enlisted in the 15th Regiment of Foot and had been promoted to lieutenant-colonel within four years, of an unattached Corps of 4,000 men, which he had raised himself.

== Political career ==
Loft was the member of Parliament for Great Grimsby, and was much involved with recruiting during the Napoleonic Wars. He was a controversial but influential figure in the development of Grimsby as a port, being one of the original shareholders named in the Great Grimsby (Lincoln) Harbour Act 1796 (36 Geo. 3. c. 98), the act of Parliament which created the Grimsby Haven Company in 1796.

== The antiquarian ==
Between around 1826 and 1844, Loft obsessively recorded details of churches, gravestones and memorials around Lincolnshire, many of which have survived and become a useful resource for historians.

== Death and legacy ==
Loft died on 13 July 1849, in a house on Loft Street, Grimsby, which had been named after him.

Parliament of the United Kingdom
Preceded by Ayscoghe Boucherett; William Mellish	Member of Parliament for Great Grimsby; 1802–1803; With: Ayscoghe Boucherett	Succeeded by Ayscoghe Boucherett; William Mellish
Preceded by Hon. Charles Anderson-Pelham; William Ellice	Member of Parliament for Great Grimsby; 1808–1812; With: William Ellice	Succeeded by John Peter Grant; Sir Robert Heron, 2nd Baronet
