= John Wharton (MP for Beverley) =

John Wharton (born John Hall-Stevenson; 21 June 1765 – 29 May 1843) was a British landowner and MP.

He was born the eldest son of Joseph William Hall-Stevenson of Skelton, in the North Riding of Yorkshire and educated at the Royal School, Armagh, Trinity College, Dublin and Lincoln's Inn. He succeeded his father in 1786, inheriting the ruinous Skelton Castle.

In 1788 he took the surname of Wharton only by sign manual on succeeding to the fortune and estates of his aunt, Mrs Margaret Wharton. He then demolished the old Skelton Castle and between 1788 and 1817 built a similarly named Gothic country house in its place.

He served as the Whig MP for Beverley from 1790 to 1796 and again from 1802 to 1826. By 1829 he was in debt and spent the next 14 years in the Fleet Debtors Prison, where he died childless in 1843.

He had married Susan Mary Anne, the daughter of General John Lambton of Lambton, County Durham. He had two daughters who both predeceased him and was succeeded by his nephew, John Thomas Wharton.

Parliament of Great Britain
Preceded by Sir Christopher Sykes, Bt; Sir James Pennyman, Bt	Member of Parliament for Beverley; 1790 – 1796; With: Sir James Pennyman, Bt	Succeeded by William Tatton; Napier Christie Burton
Parliament of the United Kingdom
Preceded by John Morritt; Napier Christie Burton	Member of Parliament for Beverley; 1802 – 1826; With: Napier Christie Burton to 1806; Richard Vyse 1806–07; Howard Vyse 1807–12; Charles Forbes 1812–18; Robert Christie Burton 1818–20; George Lane-Fox 1820–26	Succeeded by John Stewart; Charles Harrison Batley
