= Richard Vyse =

British Army general

General Richard Vyse FRSE
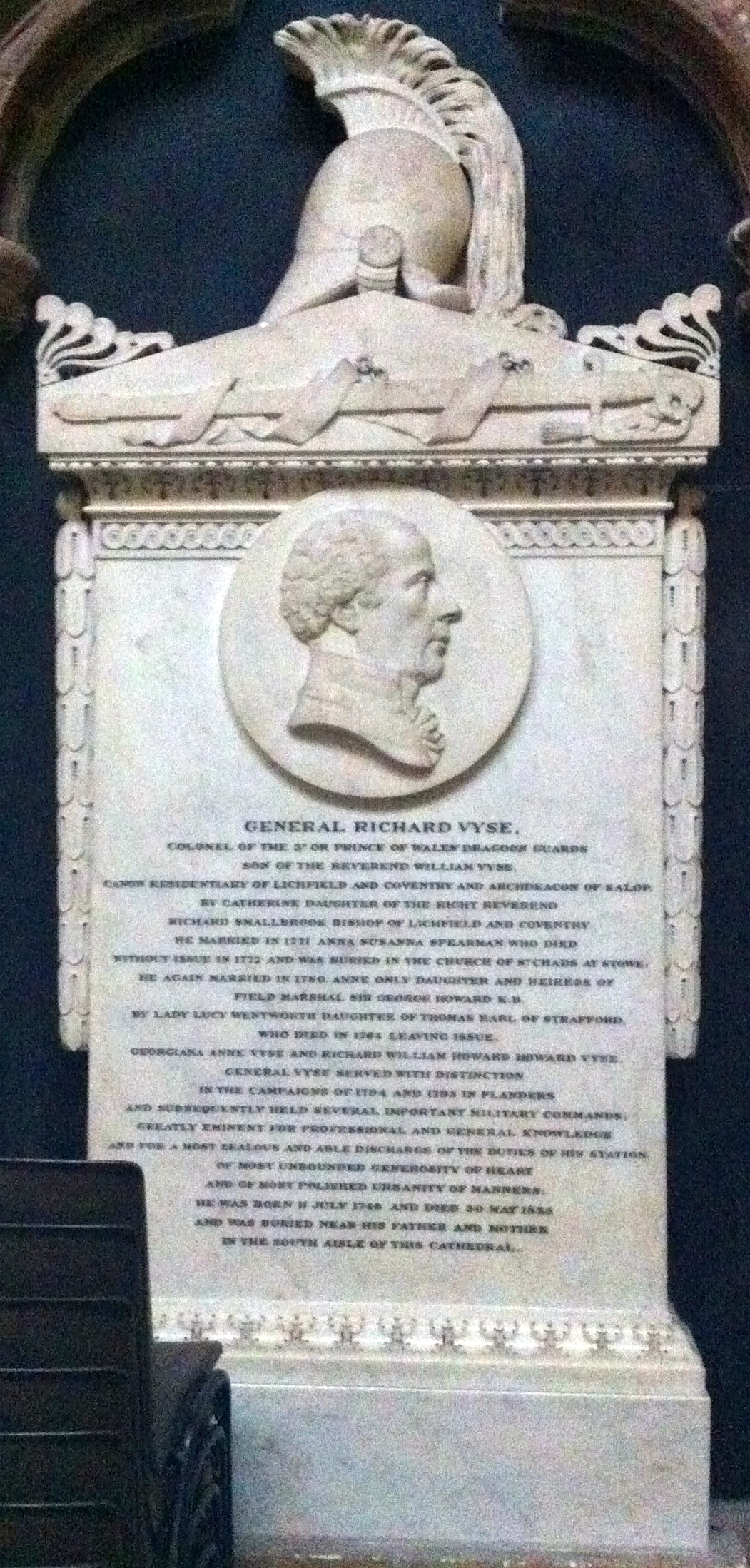
- Memorial to Richard Vyse in Lichfield Cathedral
- Born: 11 July 1746; Lichfield, Staffordshire
- Died: 30 May 1825 (aged 78); Lichfield, Staffordshire
- Relatives: Richard William Howard Vyse (son)
- Military career
- Allegiance: United Kingdom
- Branch: British Army
- Service years: 1763–1825
- Rank: General
- Commands: 1st Dragoon Guards; Scottish Command; Yorkshire District
- Conflicts: American Revolutionary War; French Revolutionary Wars; Flanders Campaign; Battle of Beaumont; Napoleonic Wars

General Richard Vyse FRSE (or Vise; 11 July 1746 – 30 May 1825) was a British Army officer, and briefly a Member of Parliament for Beverley.

== Life ==
The family's earlier history in Staffordshire is outlined by the editor of Erdeswicke. Vyse was born at Lichfield, Staffordshire the younger son of William Vyse (1710–1770), canon residentiary and treasurer of Lichfield and his wife Catherine Smalbroke, and younger brother of William Vyse (1741–1816), canon residentiary and chancellor of Lichfield. He married twice: first, in 1771, he married Anna Susannah Spearman, who died without issue a year later and was buried at St Chad's, Stowe. In 1780, he married Anne, the only surviving daughter and heiress of Field-marshal Sir George Howard and his wife Lucy Wentworth, daughter of Thomas, Earl of Strafford, and became the father of Major-General Howard Vyse, anthropologist and Egyptologist, and his sister Georgiana Anne Vyse.

Vyse was appointed cornet in the 5th Dragoons on 13 February 1763. He attained the brevet rank of colonel on 7 January 1781, received the command of the 1st Dragoon Guards on 28 May 1784, and during the revolutionary war served in Flanders in command of a brigade under the Duke of York. He distinguished himself on several occasions, particularly at the Battle of Beaumont on 26 April 1794, where at the head of two brigades of heavy cavalry, he materially contributed to the victory, and at the evacuation of Ostend, which he superintended on 1 July.

Vyse was nominated major-general on 2 October 1794, and lieutenant-general on 1 January 1801. In 1799 he was appointed Commander of Forces in Scotland and based at Edinburgh Castle. During his time in Edinburgh, in 1804, he was elected a Fellow of the Royal Society of Edinburgh. His proposers were Ninian Imrie, John Clerk, and Thomas Charles Hope. In 1805 he left Scotland to become Commanding Officer of the Yorkshire district.

He was returned to parliament in 1806 for Beverley, but in the following year made way for his son, Howard Vyse. He attained the rank of general on 1 January 1812, and died at Lichfield on 30 May 1825. He filled for some time the office of comptroller to Ernest Augustus, Duke of Cumberland. He was buried in Lichfield Cathedral near his parents: in 1827 his sister Mary (1745-1827), who had become the second wife of Spencer Madan, Lord Bishop of Peterborough, was buried beside him in the same vault. Their sister Catherine in 1768 became the second wife of Sir George Smith, 1st Bart., was widowed in the following year, and died in 1786.

== Family ==
He married Anne Howard, daughter of Field Marshal George Howard. They had one son, who was a Lt Colonel in the Life Guards and one daughter, who was Maid of Honour to Queen Charlotte.

== Notes ==
Parliament of the United Kingdom
Preceded by Napier Christie Burton; John Wharton	Member of Parliament for Beverley; 1806–1807; With: John Wharton	Succeeded by Howard Vyse; John Wharton
Military offices
Preceded by William Fawcett	Colonel of the 3rd (Prince of Wales's) Dragoon Guards; 1804–1825	Succeeded by Sir William Payne-Gallwey
