= Napier Christie Burton =

British politician

General Napier Christie Burton
- Born: Napier Christie; 31 August 1758; New York State
- Died: 2 January 1835 (aged 76); London
- Relatives: Gabriel Christie (father)
- Military career
- Allegiance: United Kingdom
- Branch: British Army
- Service years: 1775–1835
- Rank: General
- Conflicts: American Revolutionary War; Battle of Springfield; Battle of Guilford Court House; Siege of Yorktown (POW); French Revolutionary Wars; Flanders Campaign
- Other work: Lieutenant Governor of Upper Canada; Member of Parliament

General Napier Christie Burton (born Napier Christie, 31 August 1758 – 2 January 1835) was a senior British Army officer and Member of Parliament.

== Career ==
Napier Christie was born in America, the only surviving son of General Gabriel Christie of Stirling, Scotland and Montreal, Canada and his wife Sarah, the daughter of John Stevenson of Albany, New York. He took the additional surname of Burton by royal license on the death of his brother-in-law, Captain Richard Burton, in 1784 and inherited his father's estate in 1799.

He became an officer in the British Army, joining in 1775 as an ensign in the 22nd Foot. He transferred to the 3rd Foot Guards in 1776 and fought in the American War of Independence as a lieutenant. He was present at the Battle of Springfield (1780) before going to South Carolina, where he took part in the battles of Guilford and Cross Creek before being taken prisoner at the Siege of Yorktown in 1781.

After his return from America he served with the 1st Dragoon Guards in Flanders and was promoted captain and lt.-colonel in 1789, brevet colonel in 1795 and brigadier-general in 1796, when he served on the staff in Guernsey. Promoted again to major-general he served on the staff in eastern England before being posted to act as Lieutenant Governor of Upper Canada from 1799 to 1802.

In 1799 upon the death of his father, he inherited the Seignory of Léry, a lordship or seignory in southern Quebec. He looked after this until 1801 when his wife died.

He returned to England following the death of his wife and served time in Chester as a major in the 3rd Foot Guards before being posted to Ireland in 1806 as colonel-commandant of the first the 6th Battalion and then the 1st Battalion of the 60th (Royal American) Regiment of Foot (until his death).

In 1796 he was returned to Parliament as the member for Beverley. At the following general election of 1806 he fought a duel with the winning candidate, John Wharton, a fellow officer, which ended his political career.

A man who lived beyond his means he was forced to sell most of his own and his wife's inheritance to pay his debts but nevertheless spent time in prison in 1812 for owing money. In spite of this he was made a full general in 1814.

He died in 1835. He had married Mary, the daughter and eventual heiress of Major-General Ralph Burton of Hull Bank, Beverley, with whom he had 2 sons and 2 daughters. Of their sons, both of whom died unmarried, Robert Christie Burton became MP for Beverley in 1818. Their eldest daughter married firstly Major-General John Clitherow and secondly Henry Peters of Betchworth Castle. Their youngest daughter founded at Wakefield a home for discharged female prisoners.

The Municipality of Napierville (which formed on the lands of the Seignory of Léry) in Quebec, Canada, is named after him.

Military offices
Preceded by John Hope, 4th Earl of Hopetoun	Colonel of the 1st Battalion, 60th Regiment of Foot; 1816–1835	Succeeded by Sir John Maclean
Preceded by Sir Wroth Palmer Acland	Colonel of the 6th Battalion, 60th Regiment of Foot; 1806–1818	Succeeded by Battalion disbanded
Parliament of Great Britain
Preceded by Sir James Pennyman, Bt; John Wharton	Member of Parliament for Beverley; 1796–1800; With: William Tatton 1796–99; John Morritt 1799–1800	Succeeded by UK Parliament
Parliament of the United Kingdom
Preceded by Parliament of Great Britain	Member of Parliament for Beverley; 1800–1802; With: John Wharton	Succeeded by John Wharton; Richard Vyse
