= Sir Mark Sykes, 1st Baronet =

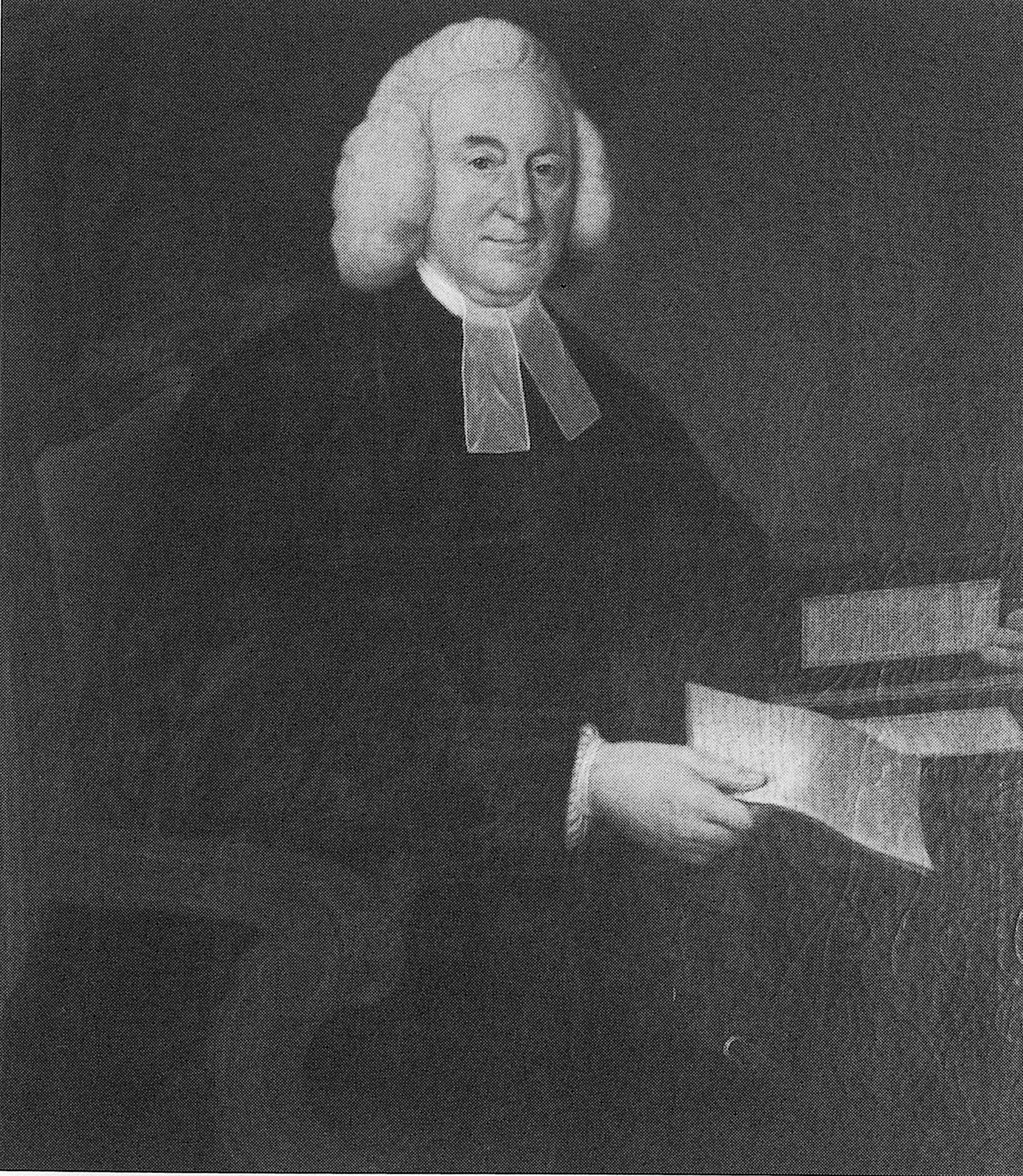
- portrait by George Chalmers
- Baptised: 9 May 1711
- Died: 14 September 1783
- Occupation: Rector
- Spouse(s): Decima Woodham
- Children: Sir Christopher Sykes, 2nd Baronet, Maria de Ponthieu
- Parent(s): Richard Sykes; Mary Kirkby

Sir Mark Sykes, 1st Baronet (9 May 1711 - 14 September 1783) was a priest in the Church of England, Rector of Roos in the East Riding of Yorkshire. Sykes was created a baronet in 1783, shortly before his death; the baronetcy was originally designed for his son Christopher, who insisted it be conferred upon his father.

He married Decima Woodham, daughter of Twyford Woodham of Ely on 9 March 1735. Their marriage bore them a son, Sir Christopher Sykes, 2nd Baronet.

In 1761 he inherited Sledmere House and its large estate from his elder brother, Sir Richard Sykes. He was succeeded by his son, Christopher.

== See also ==
- Sykes family of Sledmere

Baronetage of Great Britain
New creation	Baronet (of Sledmere); 1783	Succeeded by Christopher Sykes
