= Sister M. T. Martin =

Australian nurse

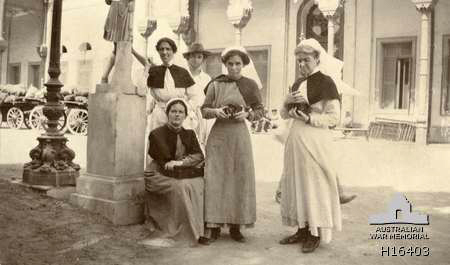
Australian Army nurses, including Sister Martin (seated), at Gezirah Palace, circa 1915.

Sister Mary Theresa Martin (1881-1929) was an Australian nurse. During World War I she served in the 2nd Australian General Hospital, Nursing Service, which was part of the Australian General Hospital.

== Life ==
Mary Theresa Martin was born in 1881 in Rockhampton in Queensland, Australia. She trained as a nurse and subsequently joined the staff of the Royal Newcastle Hospital. On the outbreak of World War I she signed up for active service abroad and was assigned to the 2nd Australian General Hospital. She sailed from Sydney on 28 November 1914 on Transport A55 Kyarra on 28 November 1914. After the war ended she returned to Australia on 9 November 1918. She found employment at the Prince of Wales Hospital, Sydney, where she worked for the next ten years.

Graffiti inside the Great Pyramid of Giza indicating Sister Martin's visit.

Mary Martin's life was probably no different from numerous others who joined and served in the Armed Forces in WWI. However, through one small incident – a memorable visit to the Great Pyramid of Giza – she left her name to posterity.

== Visit to Pyramids ==
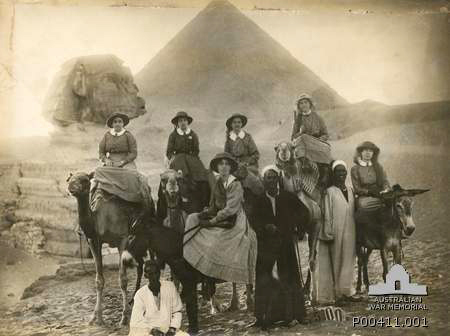
Group of Australian Army nurses visiting Sphinx and the pyramids, circa 1915.

Whilst in Egypt with thousands of other Australian troops waiting to be deployed, Mary Martin visited the Great Pyramid of Giza and painted her name on the wall inside Campbell's Chamber, the uppermost of four chambers directly above the King's Chamber. The inscription, or rather graffiti, reads "SISTER M. MARTIN 2nd. GEN. HOSP 6.2.15" indicating that she visited the pyramid on 6 February 1915. This date is consistent with the deployment of Australian troops (for example the 11th Battalion) who trained in Egypt before being sent into action.

== Death ==
She died on 23 October 1929. She was interred in the Roman Catholic portion of the Botany Bay cemetery within the Eastern Suburbs Memorial Park.
