= Sir James Pennyman, 6th Baronet =

British politician (1736–1808)

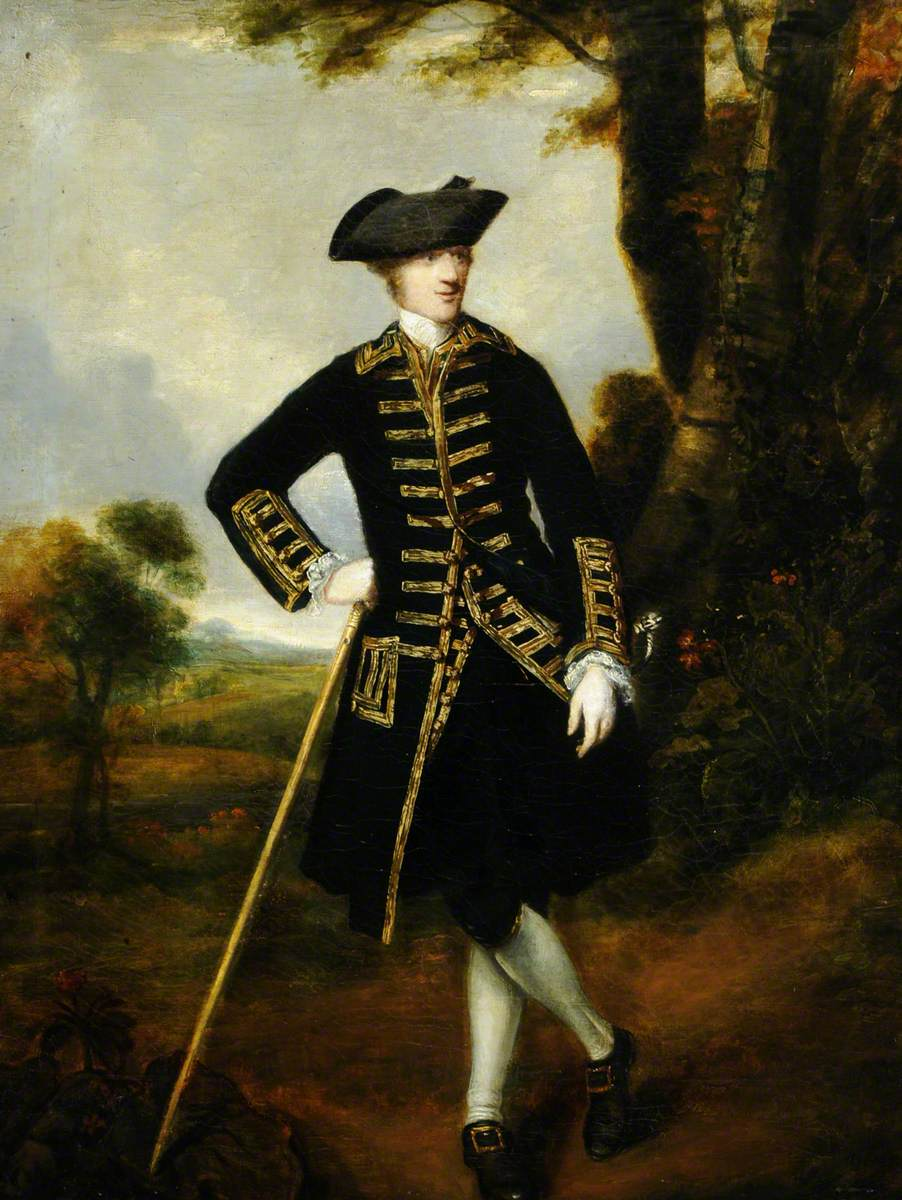
James Pennyman, portrait c. 1762

Sir James Pennyman, 6th Baronet (1736–1808) was a British politician who sat in the House of Commons for 26 years from 1770 to 1796.

== Life ==
Pennyman was the only son of Ralph Pennyman of Beverley and his wife Bridget Gee, daughter of Thomas Gee of Bishop Burton, Yorkshire and was baptized on 6 December 1736. He was educated at Westminster School in 1749, and matriculated at Christ Church, Oxford in 1756. He married firstly Elizabeth Grey, daughter of Sir Henry Grey, 2nd Baronet of Howick, Northumberland on 9 December 1762. He succeeded his father in 1768, and succeeded his uncle in the baronetcy on 14 January 1770.

Pennyman was elected Member of Parliament for Scarborough at a by-election on 27 November 1770. Pennyman employed the future Methodist leader Elizabeth Rhodes during the later 1770s as a governess to his daughter. Rhodes witnessed the Gordon Riots from Pennyman's home in 1780.

At the 1774 general election he was elected MP for Beverley and was re-elected in 1780, 1784 and 1790. He stood down at the 1796.

Pennyman made a second marriage to Mary Maleham (or Matcham) of Westminster in May 1801. He died on 27 March 1808.

His first wife, Lady Pennyman (who died only a few weeks before his second marriage), is buried in St Gregory's Church, Dawlish with a monument by John Flaxman.

Parliament of Great Britain
Preceded by George Manners; Fountayne Wentworth Osbaldeston	Member of Parliament for Scarborough; 1770–1774; With: George Manners 1770-1772; The Earl of Tyrconnel 1772-1774	Succeeded by The Earl of Tyrconnel; Sir Hugh Palliser, Bt
Preceded by Sir Griffith Boynton, Bt; Charles Anderson-Pelham	Member of Parliament for Beverley; 1774–1796; With: George Tufnell 1774-1780; Francis Evelyn Anderson 1780-1784; Sir Christopher Sykes, Bt 1784-1790; John Wharton 1790-1796	Succeeded by William Tatton; Napier Christie Burton
Baronetage of England
Preceded by Warton Pennyman-Warton	Baronet (of Ormesby); 1770–1808	Succeeded by William Pennyman
