= Spencer Madan (translator) =

English cleric

Spencer Madan (1758–1836) was an English cleric, known as a translator of Hugo Grotius.

== Life ==
He was the eldest son of Spencer Madan, bishop of Peterborough, by his first wife, Lady Charlotte, second daughter of Charles Cornwallis, 1st Earl Cornwallis. He became a king's scholar at Westminster School in 1771, and was elected to Trinity College, Cambridge, in 1776. In 1778 he was created M.A.

Madan was curate of Wrotham, Kent (1782–3). He was presented in 1786 by his uncle James Cornwallis, the Bishop of Lichfield, to the prebend and vicarage of Tachbrook, Warwickshire; but soon exchanged the prebend for the rectory of Ibstock, Leicestershire, which he held till his death. In 1787 he was given the rectory of St. Philip's, Birmingham, and resigned the Tachbrook vicarage. He succeeded his father in 1788 as chaplain in ordinary to the king. In 1790 he became canon residentiary of Lichfield Cathedral, in 1794 chancellor of the Diocese of Peterborough, and in 1800 prebendary of Peterborough Cathedral. While at Birmingham he promoted a subscription for the erection there of "a free church … for the use of the lower classes".

In 1809 Madan proceeded D.D. at Cambridge, and on resigning St. Philip's in the same year through ill-health was presented to the living of Thorpe Constantine, Staffordshire, which he held till 1824. In October 1833 he was attacked with paralysis, from which he only partially recovered.

Madan died on 9 October 1836 at Ibstock, aged 78, and was buried in a family vault at Thorpe. His children erected a tablet in Lichfield Cathedral to his memory.

== Works ==
In 1782 Madan's poem The Call of the Gentiles (Cambridge, 1782) won the Seatonian prize. He undertook, as preparation for holy orders, a translation of Grotius's De Veritate, which was published in 1782 as Hugo Grotius on the Truth of Christianity, translated into English. Other editions followed in 1792 and 1814.

Madan had a controversy in 1790 with Joseph Priestley, who published Familiar Letters addressed to the Inhabitants of Birmingham, in answer to Madan's sermon on The Principal Claims of the Dissenters considered. Madan replied with A Letter to Dr. Priestley [1790].

== Family ==
Madan married in 1791 Henrietta, daughter of William Inge of Thorpe Constantine, and had eleven children.

== Notes ==
Attribution

This article incorporates text from a publication now in the public domain: Lee, Sidney, ed. (1893). "Madan, Spencer (1758-1836)". Dictionary of National Biography. Vol. 35. London: Smith, Elder & Co.
