= Sir John Thorold, 9th Baronet =

British book collector and politician

Sir John Thorold, 9th Baronet (1734–1815) was a British book collector and politician who sat in the House of Commons from 1779 to 1796.

== Early life ==
Thorold was the eldest son of Sir John Thorold, 8th Baronet and his wife Elizabeth Ayton, daughter of Samuel Ayton of West Herrington, County Durham. He was born on 18 December 1734 and baptized at St James Westminster on 5 January 1735. He matriculated at Hertford College, Oxford on 24 November 1752. His wife was Jane Hayford, daughter of Millington Hayford of Oxton Hall, Nottinghamshire and Millington Hall, Cheshire, whom he married on 18 March 1771. He succeeded his father in the baronetcy and to Syston Park on 5 June 1775. For 1778–9 he was High Sheriff of Lincolnshire.

== Political career ==
Thorold was returned unopposed as Member of Parliament for Lincolnshire at a by-election 15 December 1779. He was also returned unopposed at the 1780 general election. In 1780, the English Chronicle described Thorold in these terms. “He is a sensible man, and sometimes speaks in the House, but he wants that brilliancy of elocution which gives effect and grace to reasoning, and is not therefore at all eminent in the present list of parliamentary orators.” He was returned unopposed for Lincolnshire in 1784 and 1790. However he withdrew in 1796 rather than face a threatened contest at Lincolnshire.

== Later life and legacy ==
Thorold was a book collector and built a library at Syston Park which included a first edition folio of Shakespeare. He died on 25 February 1815 and was succeeded in the baronetcy by his son John who extended the library collection. The city of Thorold in Ontario, which was settled by United Empire Loyalists, was named after the 9th baronet in 1793 because of his opposition to war with America and his interest in the colonies.

Parliament of Great Britain
Preceded by Lord Brownlow Bertie; Charles Anderson-Pelham	Member of Parliament for Lincolnshire; 1779–1796; With: Charles Anderson-Pelham 1779-1794; Robert Vyner 1794-1796	Succeeded by Gilbert Heathcote; Robert Vyner
Baronetage of England
Preceded by John Thorold	Baronet (of Marston); 1775-1815	Succeeded by John Hayford Thorold
