= Spencer Madan =

English churchman

The Right Reverend Spencer Madan
- Bishop of Peterborough
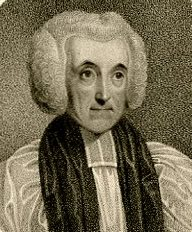
- Diocese: Diocese of Peterborough
- In office: 1794–1813
- Predecessor: John Hinchliffe
- Successor: John Parsons
- Other post: Bishop of Bristol (1792–1794)

Personal details
- Born: 1729
- Died: 8 November 1813
- Denomination: Anglican
- Spouse: (1) Lady Charlotte Cornwallis (2) Mary Vyse
- Education: Trinity College, Cambridge

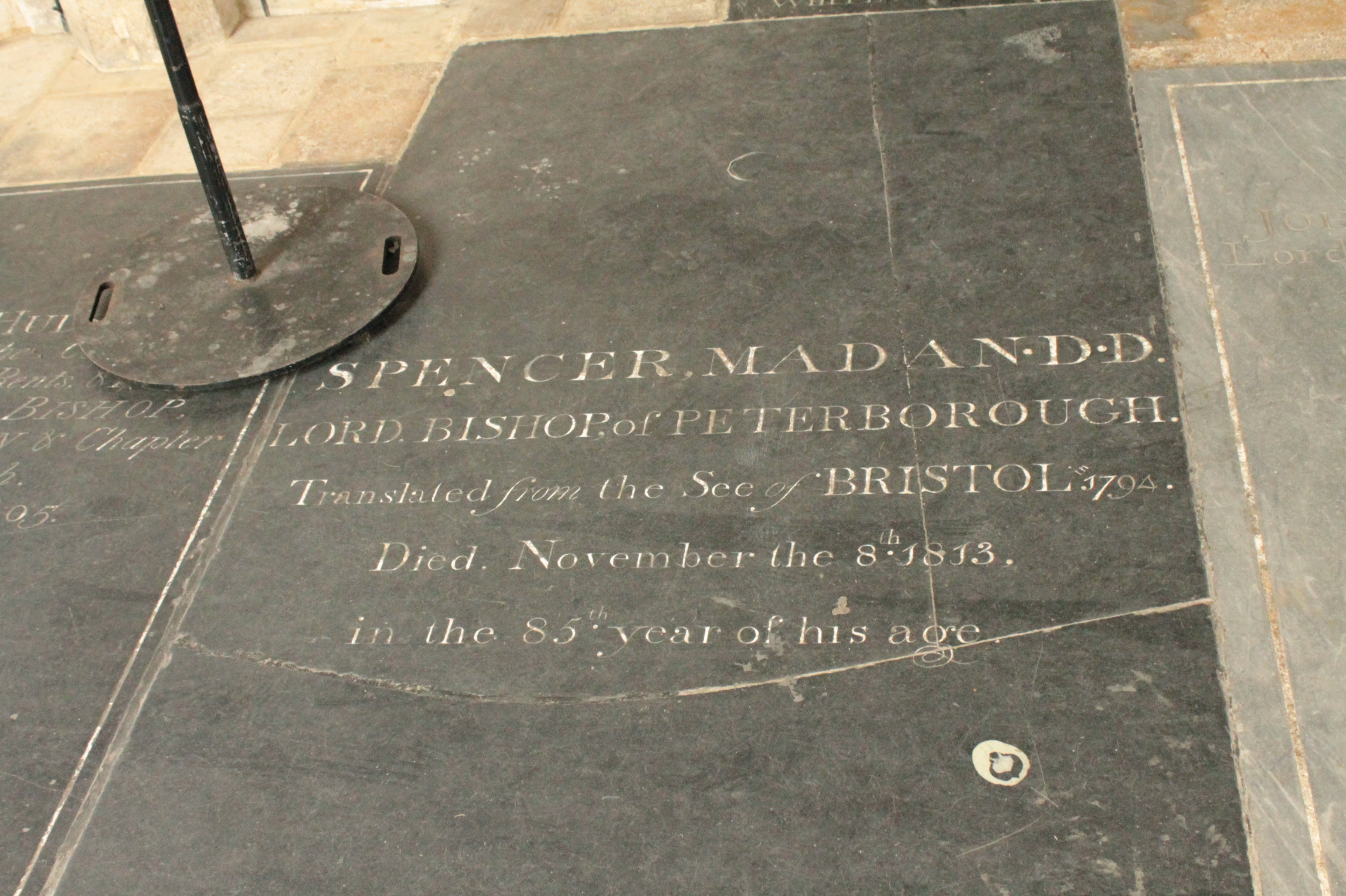
The grave of Bishop Spencer Madan, Peterborough Cathedral

Spencer Madan (1729–1813) was an English churchman, successively of Bishop of Bristol and Bishop of Peterborough.

== Life ==
The son of Colonel Martin Madan and Judith Madan of London, and younger brother of Martin Madan, he was sent to Westminster School in 1742, and in 1746 went to Trinity College, Cambridge. In 1749 he graduated B.A. as third wrangler, M.A. 1753, D.D. 1756. He was at first intended for the bar, like his elder brother, but shortly after took holy orders. In 1753 he was elected to a fellowship at his college, but after short residence became vicar of Haxhay with the rectory of West Halton, both in Lincolnshire. In 1761 he was appointed chaplain in ordinary to the king, a position which he held till 1787, being also from 1770 to 1794 prebendary of Peterborough, and at the same time rector of Castor, Northamptonshire. In 1776 he was appointed to the sinecure rectory of Ashley, Berkshire, and in 1793 was promoted as Bishop of Bristol, where he was consecrated bishop on 3 June. Early in 1794, on the death of John Hinchliffe, he was translated to Peterborough, where he remained till his death, at the age of eighty-four, on 8 November 1813.

He was buried in Peterborough Cathedral. The grave lies at the east end of the cathedral.

== Family ==
Madan was twice married, on 8 April 1756 to Lady Charlotte (1 June 1726 - 11 March 1794), second daughter of Charles Cornwallis, 1st Earl Cornwallis (buried in the Abbey Church at Bath). By her he had two sons, Spencer, and William Charles, who became a colonel in the army; and a daughter, Charlotte who married General George Warde (1725–1803). On 14 July 1796 the bishop married, secondly, Mary Vyse, daughter of William Vyse of Lichfield and sister of William Vyse (1741–1816), archdeacon of Coventry. Madan left no issue by his second marriage.

Church of England titles
Preceded by Christopher Wilson	Bishop of Bristol; 1792–1794	Succeeded by Reginald Courtenay
Preceded by John Hinchliffe	Bishop of Peterborough; 1794–1813	Succeeded by John Parsons
