= Francis Evelyn Anderson =

British Army officer and politician

Francis Evelyn Anderson (1752–1821) was a British Army officer and politician who sat in the House of Commons from 1774 to 1784.

== Early life and army ==
Anderson was the second son of Francis Anderson of Manby and his wife Eleanor Carter, daughter of Thomas Carter of Bathavern, Denbighshire, and was born on 8 April 1752. He was educated at Eton College from 1763 to 1769. His father had died in 1758, and in 1768 his mother remarried to Robert Vyner who was an MP. Anderson joined the army and was a cornet in the 15th Light Dragoons in 1770. He remained in the army in parallel with his Parliamentary career and was a lieutenant in 1779. In 1780 he was a lieutenant and captain in the 1st Foot Guards and in 1783 he became a major in the 85th Foot.

== Political career ==
Anderson’s brother Charles had changed his name to Anderson-Pelham when he succeeded to the estates of an uncle in 1763. He also had an interest in the parliamentary seats at Grimsby and at Beverley. On the strength of his brother’s interest, Anderson was returned unopposed as Member of Parliament for Great Grimsby in the 1774 general election. He was at the time 22 years old and at the start of his military career. He followed his brother in voting with the Opposition. In the 1780 general election he was returned for Beverley. Anderson was defeated at the 1784 general election which was predicted by King George III when he wrote to Pitt on 30 March. ‘I understand ... Beverley is so offended with Major Anderson that any fresh man would probably succeed there’. Anderson does not appear to have spoken in Parliament and he did not stand again.

== Later life and legacy ==
Anderson became lieutenant colonel in 1794. He married Caroline Johnstone, daughter of General James Johnstone in 1795 but had no children. He died on 12 September 1821.

Parliament of Great Britain
Preceded by Colonel Anthony St Leger; Joseph Mellish	Member of Parliament for Great Grimsby; 1774–1780; With: Joseph Mellish	Succeeded by John Harrison; Francis Eyre
Preceded by George Tufnell; Sir James Pennyman, Bt	Member of Parliament for Beverley; 1780–1784; With: Sir James Pennyman, Bt	Succeeded by Sir Christopher Sykes, Bt; Sir James Pennyman, Bt
