= William Vyse =

English churchman

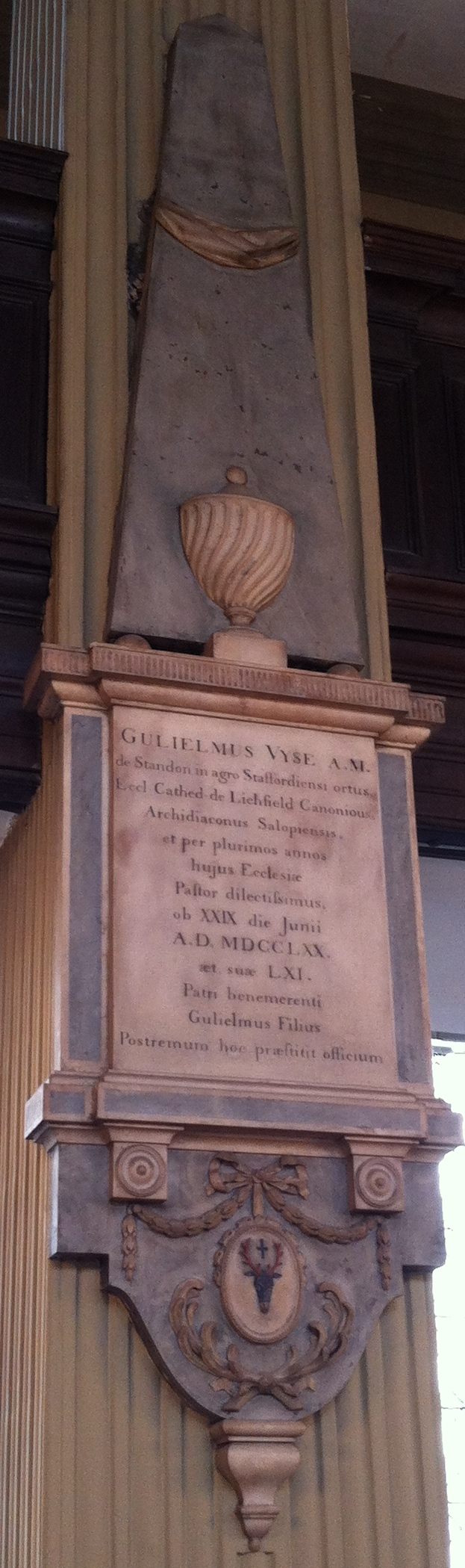
Memorial to William Vyse in Birmingham Cathedral

The Ven. William Vyse (b Sambrook 11 February 1710 – d Birmingham 29 June 1770) was an English churchman, Archdeacon of Salop from 13 March 1735 until his death.

The family's earlier history in Staffordshire is outlined by the editor of Erdeswicke. Vyse was educated at Pembroke College, Oxford, matriculating in 1727 and graduating B.A. in 1730. He held the living of St Philip, Birmingham and became Treasurer of Lichfield Cathedral in 1734. One of the "Lichfield literati", an example of his skills in improvised verse is preserved by Anna Seward.

One of his sons, Richard, became a General. Another, William, was Archdeacon of Coventry, and it was he (according to the inscription) who had the monument to his father set up in Birmingham Cathedral. William had also daughters, one of whom, Mary (born 1745), married the Right Revd. Spencer Madan, Lord Bishop of Peterborough; and, dying in 1827, she was buried at Lichfield in the same vault as her brother General George Vyse. Their sister Catherine in 1768 became the second wife of Sir George Smith, 1st Bart., was widowed in the following year, and died in 1786.

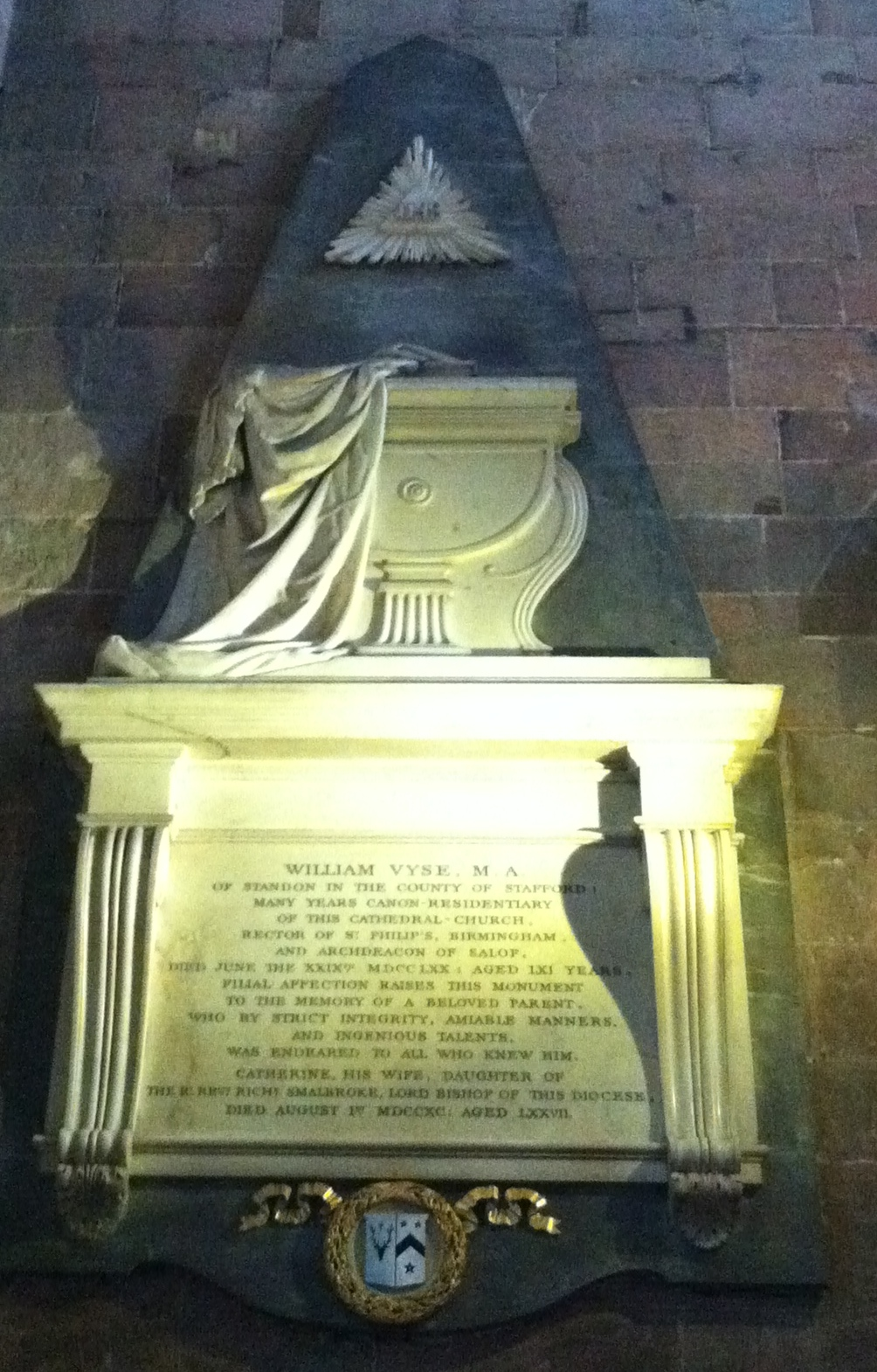
Memorial at Lichfield

He also has a wall monument at Lichfield Cathedral, which shows that he married Catherine, daughter of Richard Smalbroke, Lord Bishop of Lichfield. Both were buried in the south aisle of Lichfield Cathedral.
