= William Vyse (priest) =

English priest

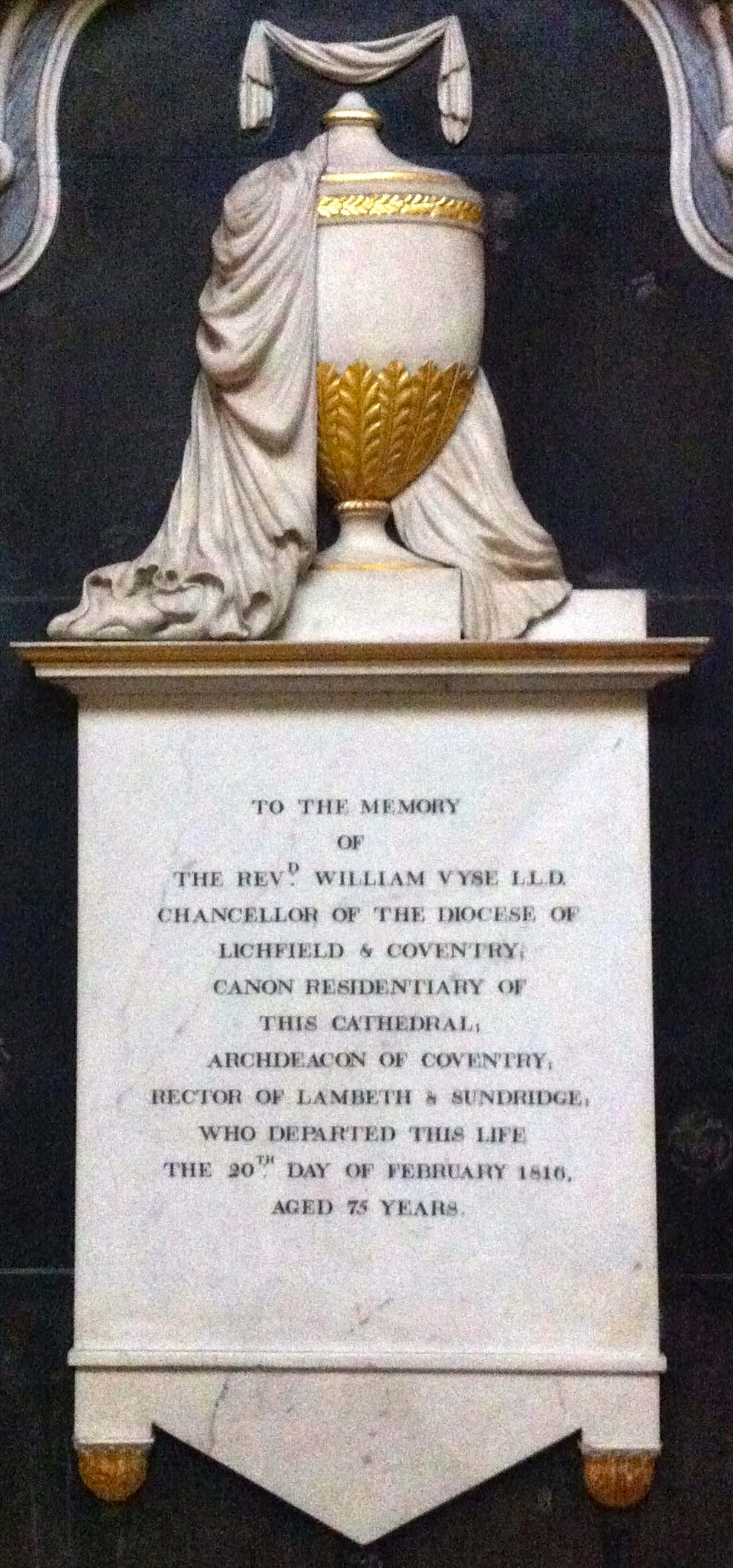
Memorial to William Vyse in Lichfield Cathedral

The Ven. William Vyse, FRS, FSA (30 October 1742 in Lichfield – 20 February 1816 in Lambeth) was Archdeacon of Coventry from 1793 until his death, and Chancellor of Lichfield from 1798.

The family's earlier history in Staffordshire is outlined by the editor of Erdeswicke. The son of William Vyse, Archdeacon of Salop and his wife Catherine Smalbroke, he matriculated at Brasenose College, Oxford in 1758, but received his degrees from All Souls' College, Oxford. In 1765-66 he travelled in France, Switzerland and Italy with Patrick Brydone and William Beckford of Somerley, and was in Rome with Beckford in 1770 when they travelled about with Dr Charles Burney, who was collecting materials for a General History of Music. He held livings in Newington, Brasted, Lambeth and Sundridge. He made inquiries on Dr. Samuel Johnson's behalf in search of Johnson's relatives around Lichfield, at the time when the Doctor was making his will in 1784.

His younger brother Richard was a General, and Comptroller of the Household of the Duke of Cumberland. His sister, Mary (1745-1827), married the Right Revd. Spencer Madan, Lord Bishop of Peterborough, and was buried at Lichfield in the same vault as her brother General Richard Vyse. Their sister Catherine in 1768 became the second wife of Sir George Smith, 1st Bart., was widowed in the following year, and died in 1786.
