= Howard Vyse =

British soldier and Egyptologist

Major-General Howard Vyse
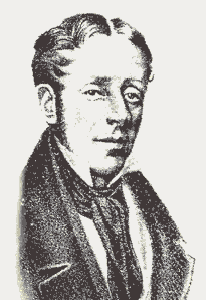
- Born: Richard William Howard Howard Vyse; 25 July 1784; Stoke Poges, Buckinghamshire, England
- Died: 8 June 1853 (aged 68); Stoke Poges, Buckinghamshire, England
- Military career
- Allegiance: United Kingdom
- Rank: Major-General
- Other work: Equerry to the Duke of Cumberland, High Sheriff of Buckinghamshire and Egyptologist

Major-General Richard William Howard Howard Vyse (25 July 1784 – 8 June 1853) was a British soldier and Egyptologist. He was also Member of Parliament (MP) for Beverley (from 1807 to 1812) and Honiton (from 1812 to 1818).

== Family life ==
Richard William Howard Vyse, born on 25 July 1784 at Stoke Poges, Buckinghamshire, was the only son of General Richard Vyse and his wife, Anne, the only surviving daughter and heiress of Field-marshal Sir George Howard. Richard William Howard Vyse assumed the additional name of Howard by royal sign-manual in September 1812 and became Richard William Howard Howard Vyse on inheriting the estates of Boughton and Pitsford in Northamptonshire through his maternal grandmother, Lucy, daughter of Thomas Wentworth, 1st Earl of Strafford (1672–1739).

He married, 13 November 1810 Frances, second daughter of Henry Hesketh of Newton, Cheshire. By her he had eight sons and two daughters; among his children were Lt Frederick Howard Vyse RN and Windsor MP Richard Howard-Vyse. Vyse died at Stoke Poges, Buckinghamshire, on 8 June 1853. His will was proved on 13 August 1853 at the Prerogative Court of Canterbury.

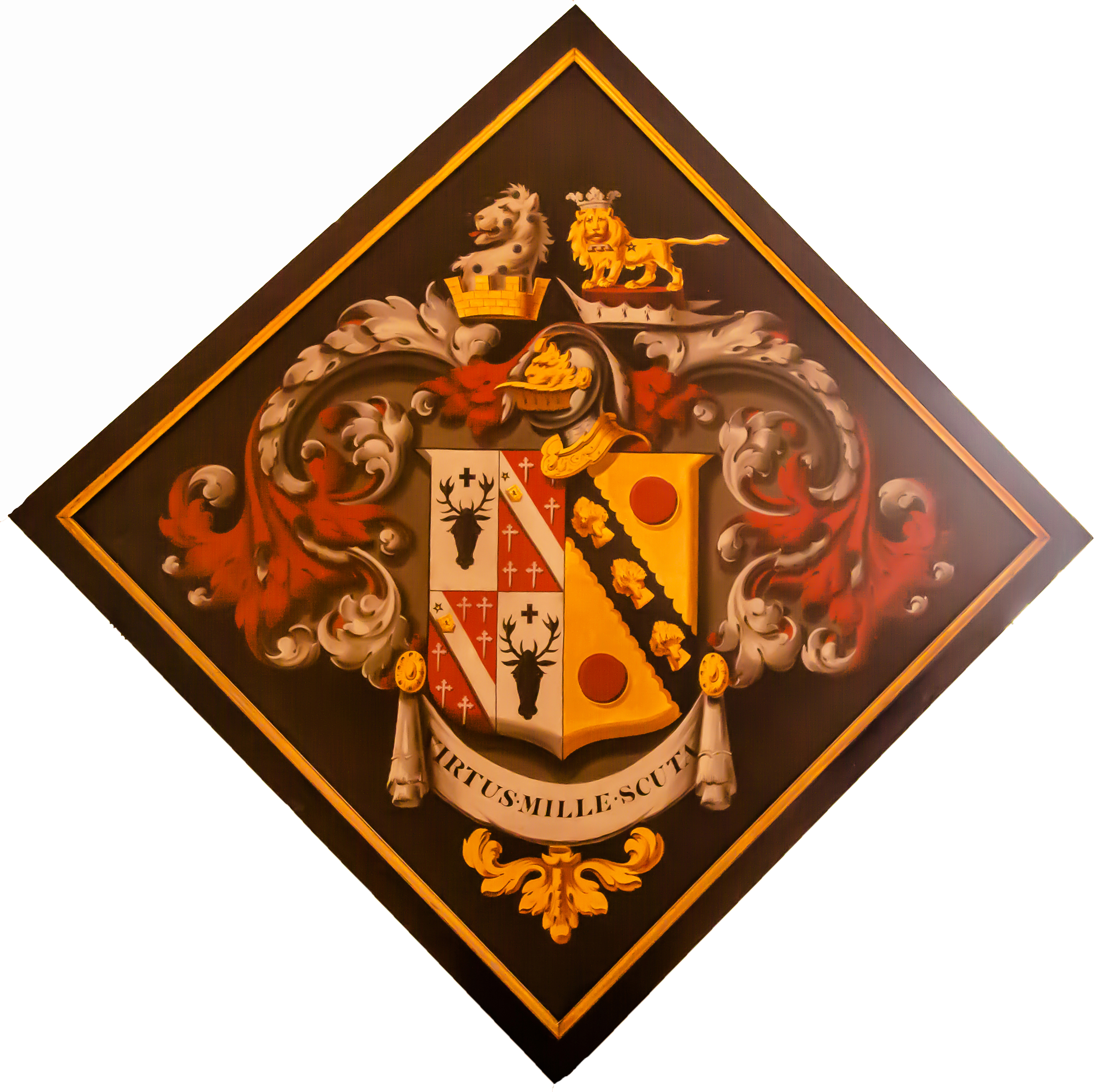
Funeral hatchment in Church of St Giles, Stoke Poges

== Military career ==
Vyse joined the British Army in 1800, being commissioned as a cornet in the 1st Dragoons on 5 May. On 17 June the following year he transferred to the 15th Light Dragoons and was promoted to lieutenant. Continuing in the 15th, Vyse was promoted to captain on 24 June 1802, and in this position served as an aide-de-camp to his father in 1809 when the latter commanded the Yorkshire Military District. Vyse was then made a brevet major on 4 June 1813. He transferred regiments again in 1815, becoming a captain in the 87th Regiment of Foot on 31 August that year. He then joined the 2nd Life Guards in the same rank on 5 July 1816, before being promoted to substantive major on 4 January 1819, in the 1st West India Regiment.

Vyse purchased a majority back into the 2nd Life Guards a month later on 4 February, and on 13 May 1820 was made a brevet lieutenant-colonel, serving as an equerry to Prince Ernest Augustus, Duke of Cumberland. He purchased a substantive lieutenant-colonelcy, unattached to any regiment, on 10 September 1825. From this stage Vyse served on half pay, being promoted to colonel on 10 January 1837 and major-general on 9 November 1846.

== Parliamentary career ==
Vyse was elected to Parliament for Beverley in Yorkshire, a borough whose elections were frequently contested, in 1807. Two months after the election Philip Staple, the losing candidate, petitioned Parliament, accusing Vyse (along with the other winning candidate, John Wharton) of bribery and corruption during the election campaign. The Select Committee to which the petition was referred declined to void the result of the election in Staple's favour. Some sixteen years after Vyse's death, evidence surfaced that most of his voters had been paid: £3.8s for a plumper and £1.14s for a split vote. Payments made after an election (as these were) were not deemed bribery under the 1729 Bribery Act (and relevant case law) and were not considered by Parliamentary Select Committees to be grounds for voiding an election.

In October 1812, Vyse exchanged his seat at Beverley for Honiton in Devonshire. On this occasion Vyse was elected unopposed as the potential third candidate, Samuel Colleton Graves, of Hembury Fort, near Honiton, invited to stand, chose instead to stand elsewhere. Vyse held this seat until the dissolution of Parliament in 1818.

He also served as High Sheriff of Buckinghamshire in 1830.

== Egyptologist ==
=== Pyramids of Giza ===
Vyse first visited Egypt in 1835 and in 1836 joined the excavations of Giovanni Battista Caviglia at Giza. Vyse found Caviglia "unproductive" and in 1837 teamed with engineer John Shae Perring in an effort to explore and document the pyramids. Their work culminated in the publishing of the Pyramids of Gizeh and the Operations carried on at the pyramids of Gizeh which the latter also includes an appendix of Vyse's account of travelling to Lower Egypt.

Vyse's "gunpowder archaeology" made one highly notable discovery in the Great Pyramid of Giza. Giovanni Battista Caviglia had blasted on the south side of the stress-relieving chamber (Davison's Chamber) on top of the King's Chamber, a chamber discovered by Nathaniel Davison in 1765, hoping to find a link to the southern air channel. But while Caviglia gave up, Vyse suspected that there was another chamber on top of Davison's Chamber, since he could insert a reed "for about two feet" upwards through a crack into a cavity. He therefore blasted straight up on the northern side, over three and a half months, finding four additional chambers. Vyse named these chambers after important friends and colleagues:

1. Wellington's Chamber (Arthur Wellesley, 1st Duke of Wellington)
2. Nelson's Chamber (Vice-Admiral Horatio Nelson)
3. Lady Arbuthnot's Chamber (Anne Fitzgerald, wife of Sir Robert Keith Arbuthnot, 2nd Baronet)
4. Campbell's Chamber (Patrick Campbell, the British agent and Consul General in Egypt).

Vyse's version of events with regards to the discovery of Wellington's Chamber was contested by Caviglia in a series of letters in which the Italian claimed he had informed Vyse of his suspicion that there was likely another chamber directly above Davison's Chamber. According to Caviglia, Vyse then betrayed his confidence on this matter and subsequently had Caviglia removed from the Giza site in order to claim the discovery for himself. In response to Caviglia's accusation, Vyse issued a strong rebuttal, dismissing Caviglia's charge.

Vyse also discovered numerous graffiti in the chambers dating from the time the pyramids were built. Along with lines, markers, and directional notations were the names of various work gangs who cut and transported the stone blocks. All of these work gang names contained a variant of the pharaoh's name i.e. Khufu, Khnum-Khuf and Medjedu, the first two of which were contained within the distinctive royal cartouche. While most of these gang names were concentrated in Lady Arbuthnot's and Campbell's Chamber, all four chambers opened by Vyse contained graffiti (or more correctly "quarry-marks" as Vyse called them). while the previously discovered Davison's Chamber contained none.

The now famous instance of Pharaoh Khufu's name is found on the south ceiling towards the west end of Campbell's Chamber. The Khufu cartouche is part of a short inscription that reads Ḫwfw śmrw ˤpr ("the gang, Companions of Khufu"), i.e. one of the gangs of workmen that constructed the chamber. Though the cartouche of Khufu is obscured by blocks or was cut off, this same gang name is also found several feet away on the last ceiling block. Vyse also depicts a partial Khufu cartouche on the North side of the chamber. Vyse had the graffiti copied by his assistant, J. R. Hill, and sent them to Samuel Birch, the Keeper of Antiquities at the British Museum who, at the time, was one of the very few scholars able to translate Egyptian hieroglyphs. Birch was able to identify this cartouche as belonging to Suphis/Cheops as it had previously been identified by the Italian scholar, Ippolito Rosellini, thereby confirming Khufu's involvement with the Great Pyramid – an association which had, until then, been reported only by Herodotus who records Khufu as the builder of the structure.

Several compound cartouches of the similarly famous "Khnum-Khufu" royal name, also part of work gang graffiti, are found in Lady Arbuthnot's Chamber, with more examples of the gang name found in Nelson's Chamber and Wellington's Chamber.

Today these chambers also contain a fair amount of 19th and 20th century graffiti, most of which is concentrated in the topmost Campbell's Chamber (e.g. Sister M. T. Martin).

== Publications ==
- Operations carried on at the Pyramids of Gizeh in 1837. Vol. 1. London. 1840.
- Operations carried on at the Pyramids of Gizeh in 1837. Vol. 2. London. 1840.
- Appendix to Operations carried on at the Pyramids of Gizeh in 1837. Vol. 3. London. 1842.

Parliament of the United Kingdom
Preceded by Richard Vyse; John Wharton	Member of Parliament for Beverley; 1807–1812; With: John Wharton	Succeeded by Charles Forbes; John Wharton
Preceded by Sir Charles Hamilton; Augustus Cavendish-Bradshaw	Member of Parliament for Honiton; 1812–1818; With: George Abercrombie Robinson	Succeeded by Samuel Crawley; Peregrine Francis Cust
Honorary titles
Preceded by Robert Harvey	High Sheriff of Buckinghamshire; 1830	Succeeded by Henry Andrewes Uthwatt
