= Charles Anderson-Pelham, 1st Baron Yarborough =

British politician

The Right Honourable The Lord Yarborough FRS FSA

Member of Parliament for Lincolnshire
- In office 1774–1794 Serving with Lord Brownlow Bertie, Sir John Thorold, Bt
- Preceded by: Thomas Whichcot; Lord Brownlow Bertie
- Succeeded by: Sir John Thorold, Bt; Robert Vyner

Member of Parliament for Beverley
- In office 1768–1774 Serving with Hugh Bethell, Sir Griffith Boynton, Bt
- Preceded by: Michael Newton; George Forster Tufnell
- Succeeded by: Sir James Pennyman, Bt; George Forster Tufnell

Personal details
- Born: Charles Anderson; 3 February 1749 Broughton, Lincolnshire
- Died: 22 September 1823 (aged 74)
- Spouse: Sophie Aufrere (m. 1770; died 1786)
- Relations: Francis Evelyn Anderson (brother)
- Children: 7, Charles
- Parent(s): Francis Anderson; Eleanor Carter
- Education: Eton College

Charles Anderson-Pelham, 1st Baron Yarborough FRS FSA (3 February 1749 – 22 September 1823) was a British politician.

== Early life ==
Anderson-Pelham was born Charles Anderson in Broughton, Lincolnshire, the eldest son and heir of Francis Anderson and his wife Eleanor (née Carter) Anderson. His father died in 1758 and in 1763, he succeeded to the estates of his great-uncle Charles Pelham and assumed the additional surname of Pelham. In 1768, his mother remarried to Robert Vyner of Gautby, Lincolnshire, who was an MP. From his mother's second marriage, he had a younger half-brother, Robert Vyner.

His paternal grandparents were Francis Anderson, of Manby and Mary (née Pelham) Anderson. His maternal grandfather was Thomas Carter of Basavern, Denbigh and his uncle was the Rev. Robert Carter–Thelwall (whose daughter, Charlotte Thelwall, was the first wife of William Beauclerk, 8th Duke of St Albans).

Anderson entered Eton with his younger brother, Francis Evelyn Anderson, in 1763, the same year he assumed the surname Pelham. In 1789, he served as steward of the Eton anniversary.

== Career ==
Anderson-Pelham was elected to the House of Commons for Beverley in 1768, a seat he held until 1774, and then represented Lincolnshire until 1794. The latter year he was raised to the peerage as Baron Yarborough, of Yarborough in the County of Lincoln. After being elevated to the House of Lords, his seat in the House of Commons was taken by his younger half-brother, Robert Vyner.

He was appointed High Sheriff of Lincolnshire for 1771. The same year, he commissioned a marble statue of Mars from John Bacon, which he exhibited in his residence.

He was elected a Fellow of the Royal Society in 1777 and a Fellow of the Society of Antiquaries in 1796.

== Personal life ==
On 21 July 1770, Charles was married to Sophie Aufrere, daughter and heir of George Aufrere of Chelsea. Before her death on 25 January 1786, they were the parents of:

- Hon. Arabella Anderson-Pelham (d. 1871), who married Thomas Fieschi Heneage, son of George Fieschi Heneage and Hon. Katherine Petre (a daughter of Robert Petre, 8th Baron Petre), in 1802.
- Hon. Georgiana Anne Anderson-Pelham (d. 1861), who married Francis John Bateman Dashwood, of Well Vale, in 1811; his sister Harriet was the wife of James Harris, 2nd Earl of Malmesbury.
- Hon. Sophia Anderson-Pelham (1775–1856), who married Dudley Long North of Glemham Hall in 1802.
- Hon. Maria Charlotte Anderson-Pelham (d. 1840), who married William Tennant of Ashton Hall, son of William Tennant, in 1804.
- Hon. Caroline Anderson-Pelham (1777–1812), who married Robert Cary Elwes, of Great Billing, in 1797.
- Charles Anderson-Pelham, 1st Earl of Yarborough (1781–1846), who married Henrietta Simpson, daughter of the Hon. John Bridgeman Simpson, in 1806.
- Hon. George Anderson-Pelham (1785–1835), who died unmarried.

Lord Yarborough died in Brocklesby, Lincolnshire, on 22 September 1823, aged 74. He was succeeded in the barony by his son Charles, who was created Earl of Yarborough in 1837.

=== Descendants ===
Through his daughter Arabella, he was a grandfather of Charles Fieschi Heneage (1806–1885), who married Louisa Elizabeth Graves (a daughter of Thomas Graves, 2nd Baron Graves), and parents of Admiral Sir Algernon Charles Fieschi Heneage.

Through his daughter Maria, he was a grandfather of Charlotte Anne Josephine Tennant, who married Sir Richard Rycroft, 3rd Baronet.

== Ancestry ==
Ancestors of Charles Anderson-Pelham, 1st Baron Yarborough

Stephen Anderson
Francis Anderson (d. 1706)
Catherine Sandys (d. 1657), great-granddaughter of Edwin Sandys, Archbishop of York
Francis Anderson (d. 1747)
John Lodington
Elizabeth Lodington (d. 1694)
Francis Anderson (1711–1758)
Sir William Pelham (d. 1644)
Charles Pelham (d. 1692)
Hon. Frances Conway, daughter of Edward Conway, 1st Viscount Conway and Dorothy Tracy (d. 1612)
Mary Pelham (1677–1733)
Michael Wharton (d. 1688), son of Michael Wharton and Catherine Maltby (matrineal descendant of Anne of York, Duchess of Exeter)
Elizabeth Wharton (d. 1726)
Hon. Susannah Poulett, daughter of John Poulett, 1st Baron Poulett and Elizabeth Kenn (1593–1663)
Charles Anderson-Pelham, 1st Baron Yarborough
Thomas Carter
Eleanor Carter

== Coat of arms ==
Coat of arms of Charles Anderson-Pelham, 1st Baron Yarborough
Coronet A coronet of an Baron Crest 1st, a peacock in pride, argent (Pelham); 2nd, a water-spaniel dog, or (Anderson). Escutcheon Quarterly; 1st and 4th grand quarters, quarterly, 1st and 4th azure, three pelicans argent, vulning themselves; 2nd and 3rd gules, two pieces of belts, with buckles erect in pale, the buckles upwards argent (Pelham); 2nd and 3rd grand quarters argent, a chevron between three crosses-flory sable (Anderson). Supporters Dexter: a bay-horse, regardant, charged on the body with three antique buckles, in bend sinister or; sinister, a water-spaniel dog, regardant, or, charged on the body with three crosses-flory in bend sable. Motto Vincit amor patriae

Parliament of Great Britain
Preceded by Michael Newton; George Forster Tufnell	Member of Parliament for Beverley; 1768–1774; With: Hugh Bethell 1768–1772; Sir Griffith Boynton, Bt 1772–1774	Succeeded by Sir James Pennyman, Bt; George Forster Tufnell
Preceded by Thomas Whichcot; Lord Brownlow Bertie	Member of Parliament for Lincolnshire; 1774–1794; With: Lord Brownlow Bertie 1774–1779; Sir John Thorold, Bt 1779–1774	Succeeded by Sir John Thorold, Bt; Robert Vyner
Peerage of Great Britain
New creation	Baron Yarborough; 1794–1823	Succeeded by Charles Anderson-Pelham
