= Sir Christopher Sykes, 2nd Baronet =

British politician (1749–1801)

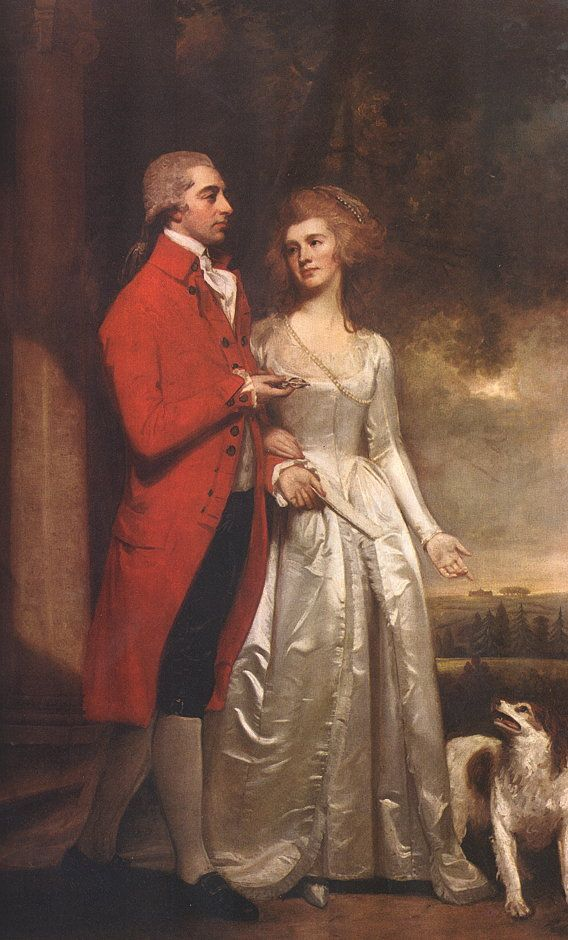
Sir Christopher and Lady Sykes by George Romney

Sir Christopher Sykes, 2nd Baronet (23 May 1749 – 17 September 1801) was an English Tory politician and a Member of Parliament (MP) for Beverley from 1784 to 1790.

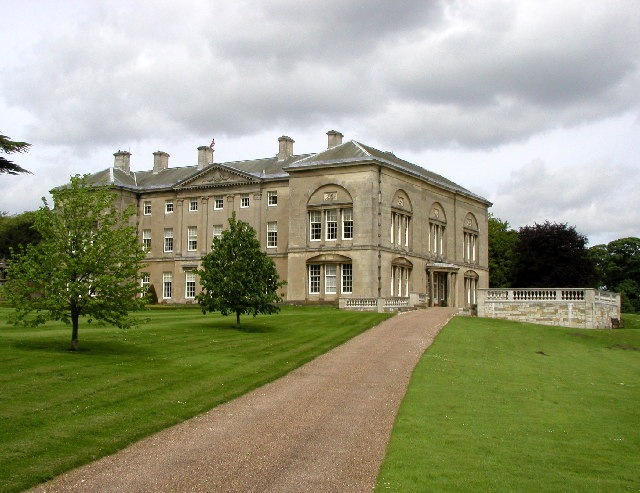
Sledmere House

He was the only son of the Reverend Sir Mark Sykes, 1st Baronet, minister of Roos in the East Riding of Yorkshire, who was created Baronet Sykes of Sledmere in Yorkshire, one of three extant Sykes Baronets, shortly before his death in 1783. On his father's death Sir Christopher inherited Sledmere House.

In the 1790s he greatly improved the house and expanded the estate He bought and enclosed huge areas of land for cultivation, built two new wings to the house, and landscaped the grounds, planting 10 square kilometres of trees. Sir Christopher left a vast estate of nearly 120 square kilometres and a large mansion set in its own 0.8 square kilometres of parkland, which survives in the family to the present day. Sir Christopher also employed Joseph Rose, the most celebrated plasterer of his day, to decorate Sledmere.

He was elected at the 1784 general election as one of the two MPs for the borough of Beverley, but did not stand again at the 1790 election.

Christopher Sykes married Elizabeth, daughter of William Tatton of Wythenshawe Hall in Cheshire, with whom he had three sons and two daughters. He was succeeded in turn by his sons Sir Mark Masterman-Sykes, 3rd Baronet and Sir Tatton Sykes, 4th Baronet. His daughter Elizabeth married her cousin Wilbraham Egerton of Tatton Park.

== See also ==
- Sykes family of Sledmere

Parliament of Great Britain
Preceded by Francis Evelyn Anderson; Sir James Pennyman, Bt	Member of Parliament for Beverley; 1784 – 1790; With: Sir James Pennyman, Bt	Succeeded by John Wharton; Sir James Pennyman, Bt
Baronetage of Great Britain
Preceded by Mark Sykes	Baronet of Sledmere; 1783–1801	Succeeded by Mark Masterman-Sykes
