= John Hotham =

John Hotham may refer to:

- Sir John Hotham, 1st Baronet (c. 1589–1645), English parliamentarian
- John Hotham (bishop) (died 1337), English medieval Chancellor of the Exchequer, Lord High Treasurer, Lord Chancellor and Bishop of Ely
- John Hotham, the younger (1610–1645), English Member of Parliament during the Civil War
- John Hotham (14th century MP), English Member of Parliament for Yorkshire
- John de Hotham (died 1361), English medieval college head and university chancellor
- John Hotham (died c.1609), MP for Scarborough and Hedon
- Sir John Hotham, 2nd Baronet (1632–1689), English politician who sat in the House of Commons from 1660 to 1685 and in 1689
- Sir John Hotham, 3rd Baronet (1655–1691), English politician who sat in the House of Commons from 1689 to 1690
- Sir John Hotham, 9th Baronet (1734–1795), English baronet and Anglican clergyman
