= Charles Hotham (disambiguation) =

Charles Hotham (1806–1855) was an Australian politician and Governor of Victoria.

Charles Hotham may also refer to:

- Charles Hotham (priest) (1615–1672), English cleric
- Charles Frederick Hotham (1843–1925), admiral in the Royal Navy
- Sir Charles Hotham, 4th Baronet (c.1663–1723), British Army officer
- Sir Charles Hotham, 5th Baronet (1693–1738), envoy from Great Britain
- Sir Charles Hotham-Thompson, 8th Baronet (1729–1794)
- Sir Charles Hotham, 10th Baronet (1766–1811) of the Hotham baronets
- Charles Hotham, 4th Baron Hotham (1836–1872), Baron Hotham
