= James Nelthorpe (Parliamentarian) =

James Nelthorpe of Beverley, Yorkshire was a mercer, draper and politician who sat in the House of Commons in the Long Parliament between 1645 and 1660.

Nelthorpe was the sixth and youngest son of Edward Nelthorpe of Glanford Brigg. He was a mercer and draper and was also mayor of Beverley.

Nelthorpe was returned as member of parliament for Beverley in 1645 and sat in the Long Parliament until it was dissolved in 1648. He was named as one of the judges of King Charles I but managed to avoid becoming involved in the regicide. He was returned in the restored Long Parliament in 1659.

Nelthorpe was married and the father of Richard Nelthorpe, who was involved in the Rye House Plot and was executed after the Battle of Sedgemoor. His nephew Goddard Nelthorpe succeeded his uncle to the Nelthorpe baronetcy.

Parliament of Great Britain
Preceded by Sir John Hotham, Bt; Michael Warton	Member of Parliament for Beverley; 1645–1648; With: John Nelthorpe 1645-1648	Succeeded by Not represented in Barebones Parliament
Preceded by Thomas Strickland; John Anlaby	Member of Parliament for Beverley; 1659–1660	Succeeded by Hugh Bethall; Sir John Hotham, Bt
