= Hotham, East Riding of Yorkshire =

Village and civil parish in the East Riding of Yorkshire, England

Coordinates: 53°47′46″N 0°38′37″W

Hotham
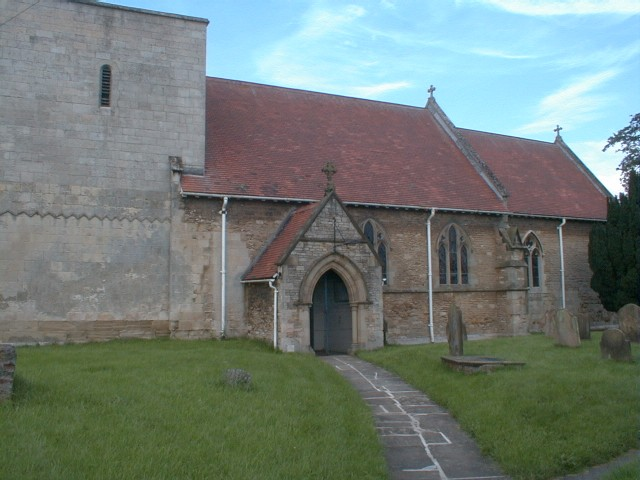
- St Oswald's Church, Main Street

- Location within the East Riding of Yorkshire
- Population: 233 (2011 census)
- OS grid reference: SE894341
  - London: 155 mi (249 km) S
- Civil parish: Hotham
- Unitary authority: East Riding of Yorkshire
- Ceremonial county: East Riding of Yorkshire
- Region: Yorkshire and the Humber
- Country: England
- Sovereign state: United Kingdom
- Post town: YORK
- Postcode district: YO43
- Dialling code: 01430
- Police: Humberside
- Fire: Humberside
- Ambulance: Yorkshire
- UK Parliament: Goole and Pocklington

Hotham is a small village and civil parish in the East Riding of Yorkshire, England. It is situated approximately 16 miles (26 km) west of Hull, 21 miles (34 km) south east of York and 4 miles (6 km) south of Market Weighton town centre. The village has road links with the cities of Kingston upon Hull, York and Leeds. The eastern end of the M62 motorway, at Junction 38, is 2 miles (3 km) south-west from Hotham.

According to the 2011 UK census, Hotham parish had a population of 233, a decrease on the 2001 UK census figure of 256.

The village has about 100 houses, the Hotham Arms public house, and a village hall. Other amenities are in the neighbouring villages of North Cave and South Cave. The village is under the York postcode and the local authority is the East Riding of Yorkshire Council.

St Oswald's Church, Hotham was designated a Grade II* listed building in 1966 and is now recorded in the National Heritage List for England, maintained by Historic England.

== History ==
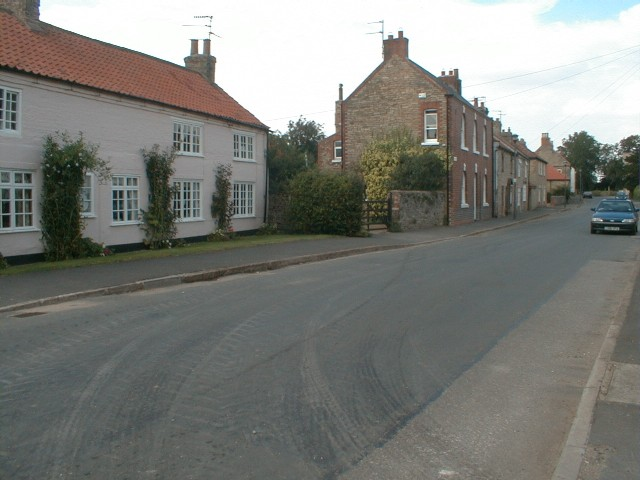
Main Street

The name Hotham derives from the plural form of the Old English hōd meaning 'shelter'.

Hotham was once the land of Sir John Hotham, 1st Baronet, Governor of Hull, and his son John, often referred to as Captain Hotham. Sir John Hotham was knighted by King James I and was a Member of Parliament.

In 1641, the Royalist army left an arsenal in the nearby city of Hull. Sir John Hotham was invested with the full authority of both Houses of Parliament to retain the arsenal regardless of circumstance. King Charles wrote to Sir John informing him of his intentions to join his son James, Duke of York who was residing in Hull. After holding a meeting in Ye Olde White Hart Inn on 23 April 1642 it was decided by majority vote that the gates of the city would be closed to the king. The king was furious and Sir John was dubbed a traitor. A siege of Hull by the king lasted for three weeks and although Sir John escaped to his manor at Scorborough he was arrested and taken to the Tower of London. The House of Commons ordered that money, plots of land and the goods belonging to Sir John be seized. In December 1644 he was tried and condemned to execution. Sir John's son, Captain Hotham, was also deemed guilty and executed. The estate was left to Captain Hotham's only son, also called John, aged 13. Like his grandfather, John became an MP for the local town of Beverley and went into exile in 1684 after the exclusion crisis. He returned with William of Orange in 1688 and was appointed the Governor of Hull in 1689. He died that year after becoming ill with a "chill" while travelling from Hull to Beverley. The Hotham family's estate is now in the nearby village of South Dalton.

A railway line, now disused, once connected Hull, Beverley and York. The line was built by the York and North Midland Railway. The first passenger train ran from York to Market Weighton, where the line ended, on 3 October 1847. It was another 17 years before the rest of the line, from Market Weighton to Beverley, was completed. Lord Hotham, who owned much of the farmland between Market Weighton and Beverley, was reluctant to have a railway built across his estate on the Yorkshire Wolds. He finally agreed to let the railway through - on the condition that he was provided with his personal station, at Kiplingcotes and that no trains ran on Sundays. The first through train from Hull to York ran on 1 May 1865.

In 1823 Hotham was a civil parish in the Wapentake of Harthill. The parish church was under the patronage of the King. Baines History, Directory and Gazetteer of the County of York recorded that a Roman road passed near the village and towards North and South Newbald. Population at the time was 293, with occupations including nine farmers and yeomen, two shopkeepers, a shoemaker, a bricklayer, a blacksmith, a corn miller, a carpenter, and a tailor. A clock maker also ran a village day school. A carrier operated between the village and Market Weighton and Hull twice weekly.

== See also ==
- Listed buildings in Hotham, East Riding of Yorkshire
