= Edward Rodes =

High Sheriff of Yorkshire

Sir Edward Rodes (c. 1600 – 19 February 1666), also called Edward Rhodes, of Great Houghton, Yorkshire, served as High Sheriff of Yorkshire and colonel of horse under Cromwell; he was also a member of Cromwell's privy council, sheriff of Perthshire, and represented Perth in the parliaments of 1656–8 and 1659–1660. Rodes' sister Elizabeth was third wife and widow of Thomas Wentworth, 1st Earl of Strafford.

== Biography ==
Notwithstanding the near connection which subsisted between Sir Edward Rodes and the Earl of Strafford (his sister Elizabeth was Strafford's third wife and widow), there was a wide difference in the political and religious views of each. Few entered more eagerly into the objects contemplated by the Long Parliament, when affairs were advancing to a crisis; and it was for the most part to Rodes, and his two friends the Hothams, that the scheme, for maintaining the peace of Yorkshire (the Treaty of Neutrality), arranged by the two great parties at Rothwell on 29 September, before the war began, was frustrated. Rodes' zeal that may have been quickened by personal injury—One of the stipulations at the treaty was that reparation should be made to "Sir Edward Rodes for the injury done him"—for at the beginning of September 1643, an attack was made on his house at Great Houghton, by a party of royalists under the command of Captain Grey, when, according to the diurnals of the time, all the outhouses were burnt, his goods plundered to the amount of £600, his lady uncivilly treated, some of his servants wounded, and one slain.

Of all the gentry of Yorkshire, there were only two dissenters, on the parliament side, to that engagement of neutrality, young Holham and Sir Edward Rhodes who, although of better quality, was not so much known or considered as the other; but they quickly found seconds enough when the parliament refused to ratify the treaty, and declared it to be injurious to the common cause.

— Clarendon History of the Rebellion.

Later during the First Civil War Rodes was taken into custody by Parliament, and with the Hothams committed to the Tower of London, but as nothing could be proved against him he was liberated, (John Hotham and his son, John Hotham the younger, were beheaded for treason after they were found guilty of conspiring to hand Hull over the Royalists).

During the Second Civil War, Royalists gained control of Pontefract Castle and started to plunder and capture prominent local Parliamentarians. To counter the threat, the Parliamentary committee of the militia of Yorkshire appointed Rodes with Henry Cholmley to levy troops and advance on Pontefract Castle. They were ordered to invest the castle, but if their forces were insufficiently strong to besiege of the castle, then they to endeavour to keep in the garrison in the castle and to protect and preserve the surrounding countryside. It seems that Cholmley took overall command while Rodes commanded the cavalry, as Rodes was ordered by Oliver Cromwell to pursue the Duke of Hamilton, the commander of the combined English Royalist and Scottish Covenanter armies after his defeat by Cromwell and the New Model Army at the Battle of Preston.

At the end of August on his return from Scotland Cromwell took overall command for the sieges of Scarborough and Pontefract (at which point Rodes came under his direct command again). Cromwell reinforced the besiegers at Pontefract so that the Parliamentarians now had five thousand men and Sir Edward's squadrons besieging the castle.

That the siege of Pontefract Castle was ineffective was highlighted when on 31 October Colonel Thomas Rainsborough was killed at Doncaster, by a party of Cavaliers who sallied out of Pontefract, to capture him, but when he shouted for his guard and attempted to defend himself with a pistol, they cut him down and returned to the castle. Rainsborough was on his way to take command of the siege which was proving to be a difficult fortress to subdue as it was "[...] one of the strongest inland garrisons in the kingdom". Cromwell took direct command of the siege and fully invested the castle with lines of circumvallation. Cromwell had to leave on other business and so General Lambert took command on 4 December. The Royalist garrison finally surrendered on 24 March 1649.

During the Interregnum Rodes served as High Sheriff of Yorkshire in 1650, and was commissioned as a colonel of horse under Cromwell in 1654; he was also a member of Cromwell's privy council. It would seem that Rodes was much in Scotland during the protectorate, for he was sheriff of Perthshire, and represented Perth in the parliaments of 1656–8 and 1659–1660 and at the same time that his son was returned for Linlithgow, Stirling, and Clackmannan.

After the restoration Rodes was allowed to live quietly at Great Houghton, which became an asylum to the ejected ministers, who refused to comply with the Act of Uniformity 1662.

Sir John's first large post-Restoration loan, of £2500 1n 1661, was to Sir Edward Rhodes of Great Houghton, formerly Stephen Bright's debtor and a fellow Parliamentarian. Rhodes discharged some of this debt in 1664 by selling property in Great Houghton to Sir John for £1,720. He then leased the land back from Sir John, paying the rent and the rest of the loan in annual installments of £250.

— Peter Roebuck.

Rodes was still living at Great Houghton when William Dugdale visited, but died soon after.

== Family ==
Rodes married Mary (or Margaret), the daughter of Hammond Whichcote and Millicent Markham in 1629. They had a number of children, but only one son, William. William had two sons, Godfrey (d. unmarried 1709) and William Rodes of Great Houghton, the last male heir of this branch of the family, who died unmarried in 1740, leaving his two sisters as his co-heirs.

== Notes ==
Parliament of England
Preceded by The Earl of Linlithgow	Member of Parliament for Perth; 1656–1659	Succeeded by Mungo Murray; Sir George Kinnaird (Parliament of Scotland)
