= James Fleming (British Army officer) =

Major-General James Fleming
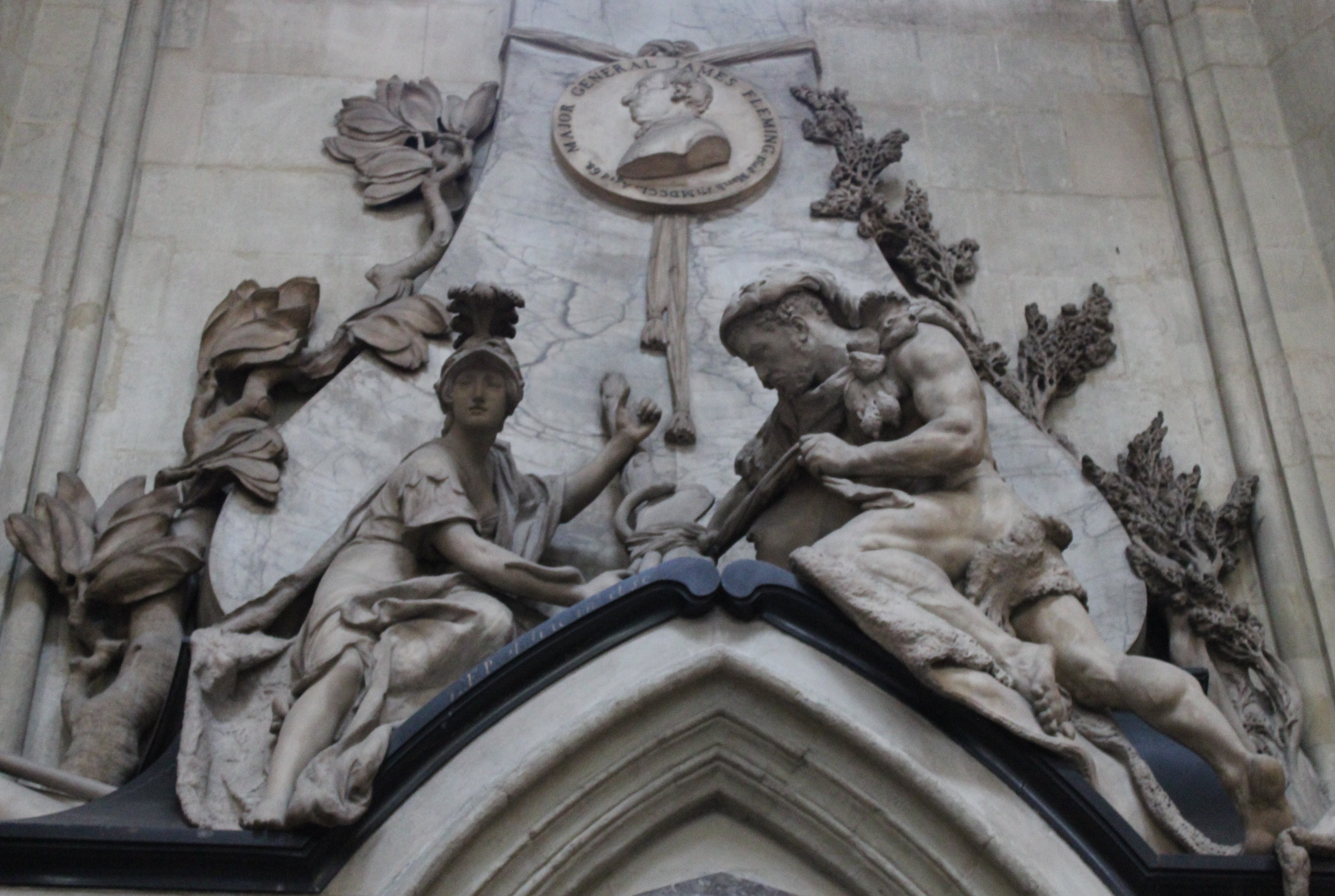
- Fleming's monument in Westminster Abbey by Louis-François Roubiliac
- Born: 1682
- Died: 31 March 1751 (aged 68–69) Bath, Somerset, England

James Fleming (or Flemming; 1682 – 31 March 1751) was a British major-general, and colonel of the 36th (Herefordshire) Regiment of Foot.

Fleming was wounded at the Battle of Blenheim when serving as a captain in the Earl of Derby's regiment (16th Foot, now 1st Bedford). Afterwards for many years, he commanded the Royal Fusiliers, until promoted on 9 January 1741, colonel of the 36th Foot (now 2nd Worcester). He became a brigadier-general in 1745, was present at both the Battle of Falkirk and the Battle of Culloden, and became major-general in 1747.

He died at Bath, 31 March 1751. A monument with a medallion portrait and figures of Hercules and Minerva was erected to his memory in Westminster Abbey, where he is buried.

== Notes ==
Military offices
Preceded by Humphrey Bland	Colonel of Fleming's Regiment of Foot; 1741–1751	Succeeded by Lord Robert Manners
