= Charles Hotham (priest) =

English cleric

Charles Hotham (1615 – c. 1672) was an English cleric.

== Biography ==
Hotham was the third son of Sir John Hotham, of Scorborough, near Beverley, Yorkshire, governor of Hull, by his second marriage, was born on 12 May 1615, and was educated at Christ's College, Cambridge. His name is appended to some Latin verses in "Carmen Natalitium Principis Elisabethæ", published by members of the university in 1635. He graduated B.A. in 1635–1636, and M.A. in 1639.

Hotham succeeded to the family living of Hollym, near Withernsea, on 5 November 1640, and on resigning in 1640 returned to Cambridge, where he was appointed by the Henry Montagu, Earl of Manchester one of the fellows of Peterhouse who succeeded Beaumont, Crashaw, and others, on their being turned out in June 1644.

In 1646 Hotham was university preacher and served the office of proctor. Newcome records that "among other of his singularities he made the sophisters say their positions without book". He was regarded as "a man of very great eminency in learning, strictness in religion, unblamableness in conversation". In his younger days he studied astrology, and afterwards had a love for chemistry, and was "a searcher into the secrets of nature".

In March 1646 Hotham delivered in the schools at Cambridge a discourse, which was published two years later, with the title of "Ad Philosophiam Teutonicam Manuductio, seu Determinatio de Origine Animæ Humanæ, ..." (12mo, pp. xvi, 42). It contains some complimentary verses by his friend Henry More. A translation of this tract was published in 1650 by his brother, Durant Hotham. In December 1650 he preached against "The Engagement" and was forbidden to pursue the subject.

On 29 March 1651 Hotham presented a petition to the committee for the reformation of the universities, embodying a complaint against Dr. Lazarus Seaman, master of Peterhouse. Not being satisfied with the result of his petition he published it, along with some bitter observations on the action of the committee; whereupon on 29 May it was resolved that his book was scandalous and against the privilege of parliament, and that he should be deprived of his fellowship. In vindication of himself he then printed a statement of his case, with a strong testimonial in favour of his character, signed by thirty-three leading men in the university. Later in the year he republished these tracts in a small 12mo volume entitled "Corporations Vindicated in their Fundamental Liberties, ...".

Hotham was appointed rector of Wigan in 1653. In 1654 he translated Boehme's "Consolatory Treatise of the Four Complexions" (London, 12mo); and in 1656 wrote a poetical commendation of thirty-eight lines to the "Drunkard's Prospective", by Major Joseph Rigbie (a curious little work against intemperance).

At the Restoration in 1660 Hotham was pronounced unorthodox, and his ejection from Wigan in favour of John Burton was attempted. He continued rector, however, until 1662, when, on refusing to conform, he was forced to retire. He subsequently went to the West Indies and became one of the ministers of the Somer Islands (Bermudas). He is so described in his will, dated 15 February 1672, proved at London on 2 March 1674. (Note: The will is dated 15 February 1671 and proved 2 March 1673/4 The start of year at the time was 25 March (see Old Style and New Style dates, so the years are presumably 1672 and 1674 respectively (Sutton 1891, p. 405).) In it he ordered his astrological books to be burnt, "as monuments of lying vanity and remnants of the heathen idolatry". In later life he had interested himself in chemistry and astronomy, and was elected a Fellow of the Royal Society in 1667.

== Family ==
Hotham married at Wigan, on 15 September 1656, Elizabeth, daughter of Stephen Thompson of Humbleton, Yorkshire. She was buried at Little Driffield, Yorkshire, on 29 April 1685.

Their eldest son, Charles, who succeeded his cousin John as 4th Baronet in 1691, was intended for the ministry, but went into the army, became brigadier-general and colonel of the royal regiment of dragoons. He sat for some time as M.P. for Beverley, and was knighted.
