= 15th Regiment of Light Dragoons =

Two cavalry regiments of the British Army have been numbered the 15th Regiment of Light Dragoons:

- Duke of Cumberland's Regiment of Light Dragoons, raised in 1746 and disbanded in 1749
- 15th The King's Hussars, raised in 1759, redesignated a Hussar regiment in 1807

== See also ==
- 15th Regiment (disambiguation)
