= John Moyser =

English politician (died 1739)

John Moyser (c. 1659 – 1739) was an English Tory politician and architect. He sat as MP for Beverley from 1705 till 1708.

== Family and education ==
He was the fourth but oldest surviving son of James Moyser (died 1695) and Frances, the daughter of Edward Yarburgh and widow of Sir John Reresby, 1st Baronet. He is the half-brother of Sir John Reresby, 2nd Baronet. He was educated at Beverley school and admitted into St John's College, Cambridge on 27 April 1677, at the age of 16. He married his first wife circa. April 1687, Mary or Margaret, the daughter of Anthony Eyre and sister of Gervase Eyre. On 26 August 1692, he married his second wife Catherine, the daughter of John Heron and widow of Sir John Hotham, 3rd Baronet. They had two sons and four daughters.

== Parliamentary career ==
In December 1699, he was appointed deputy-lieutenant for the East Riding. In April 1705, he was made a freeman of Beverley. He was elected MP of Beverley unopposed in 1705 on the recommendation of Sir Charles Hotham, 4th Baronet and Sir Michael Warton, 3rd Baronet. He voted for the Court (Whig) candidate, John Smith. In early 1708, he was listed as a Tory, later that year he did not stand for re-election.

== Later life ==
Using designs from Grecian and Classical antiquity, Moyser spent the remainder of his life restoring Beverley Minster. In 1710, he established a charitable school. When he passed away in 1739, he left money in his will to support the vicar of St. Mary's, Beverley, with an assistant curate.
