= St Oswald's Church, Hotham =

Church in Hotham, East Riding of Yorkshire, England

Coordinates: 53°47′59″N 0°38′37″W

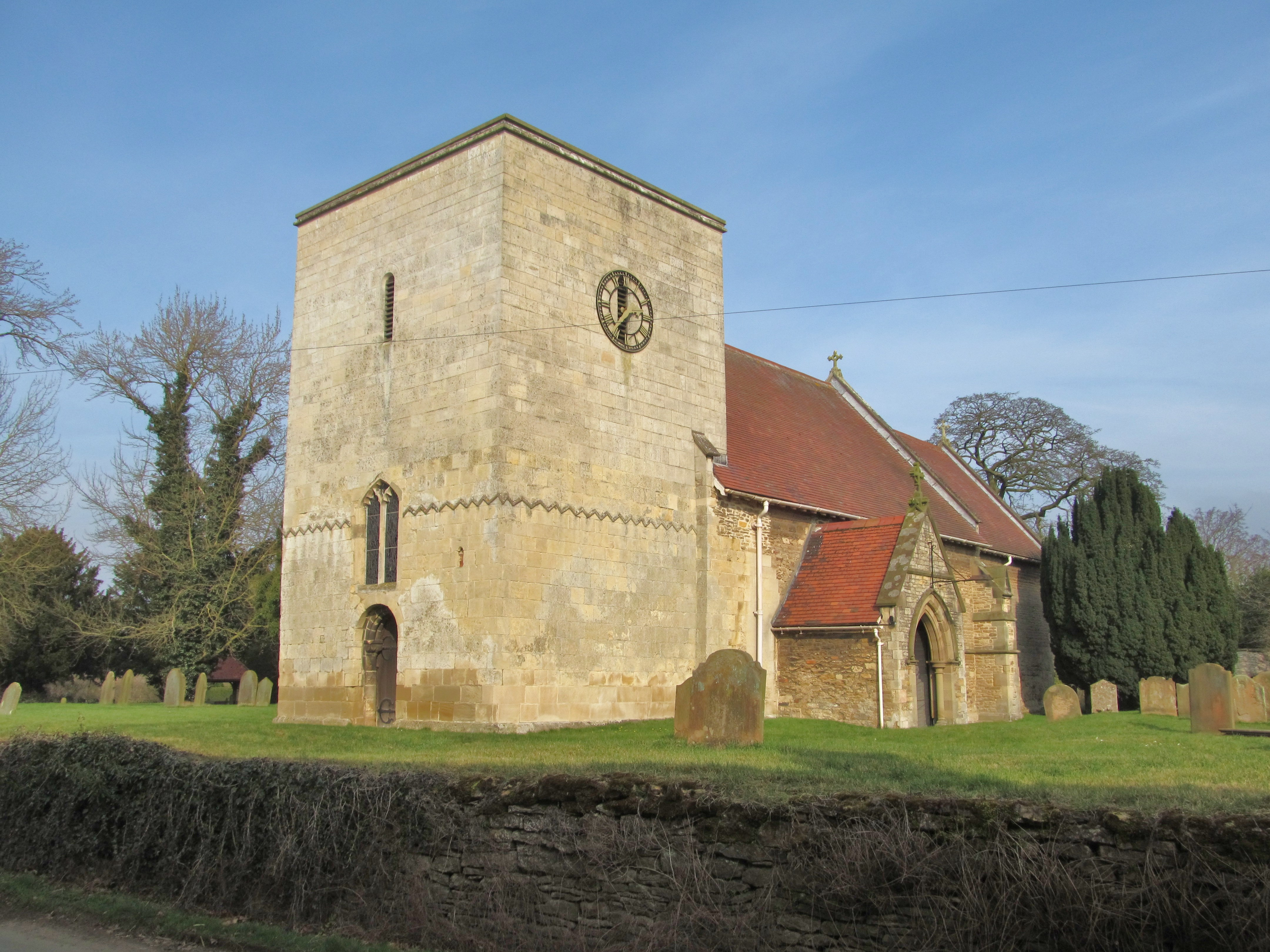
The church, in 2015

St Oswald's Church is the parish church of Hotham, East Riding of Yorkshire, a village in England.

The church was built in the early 12th century, with the nave later being widened to the north. The massive tower, which contrasts with the small body of the church, was restored in 1789. The nave was extended in the early 19th century, and the nave and chancel were heavily restored by Frederick Stead Brodrick in 1904 and 1905, the work including the rebuilt of the chancel, much of the nave, and the upper part of the tower. The building was grade II* listed in 1966.

The church is built of stone, with an extension in brick to the nave, and a Broseley tile roof. It consists of a nave with an extension to the north, a south porch, a chancel with a north vestry, and a Norman west tower. The tower is broad and squat, and contains a round-arched west doorway with two moulded orders on scalloped capitals. Above it is a two-light pointed window breaking a zigzag band running along three sides of the tower. The bell openings have round-arched heads, and on the south front is a clock face.

== See also ==
- Grade II* listed buildings in the East Riding of Yorkshire
- Listed buildings in Hotham, East Riding of Yorkshire
