= Lord Robert Manners (British Army officer, died 1782) =

English soldier and nobleman (d. 1782)

General Lord Robert Manners (c. 1721 – 31 May 1782) was an English soldier and nobleman. He was a son of John Manners, 2nd Duke of Rutland and his second wife, Lucy Sherard.

== Life ==
He purchased an ensigncy in the Coldstream Guards on 26 July 1735, and was promoted lieutenant in May 1740. On 22 April 1742, he was promoted captain and lieutenant-colonel in the 1st Foot Guards, and in December 1747, colonel and aide-de-camp to King George II. Manners was returned as Member of Parliament for Kingston upon Hull in 1747, and kept the seat for the remainder of his life. In September 1748, he was appointed colonel of the 15th Light Dragoons, which were shortly thereafter disbanded. On 13 March 1751 he was made colonel of the 36th Regiment of Foot, and was promoted major-general on 7 February 1757, and lieutenant-general on 7 April 1759. He was transferred to the colonelcy of the 3rd (The Prince of Wales's) Dragoon Guards on 6 September 1765. He was promoted general on 25 May 1772 and died on 31 May 1782.

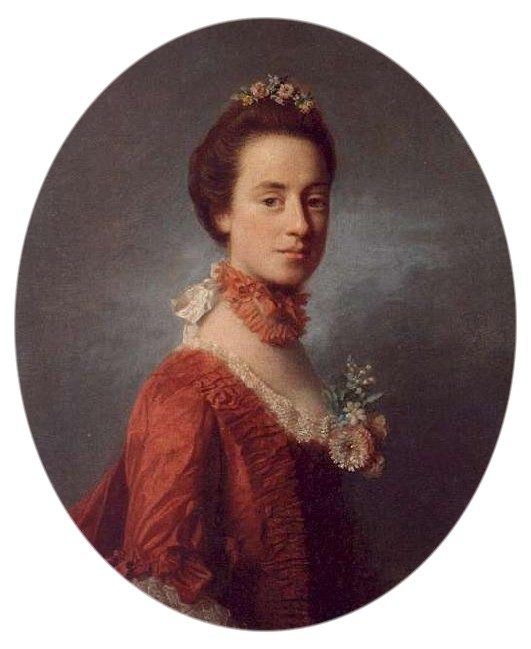
Lady Robert Manners (1756) by Allan Ramsay

On 1 January 1756 he married Mary Digges (c. 1727–1829), by whom he had several children:

- Mary Manners (1756–1834), married on 31 January 1777 William Hamilton Nisbet (1747–1822)
- General Robert Manners (1758–1823), had five children by his mistress, Mary Ann Goodchild (1780–1854)
- John James Manners (1762–1763)
- George Manners (1763–1828), of Bloxholm and Ufford Hall, unmarried
- Lucy Manners (1764–1835), inherited the manor of Drayton Beauchamp from her mother, unmarried

General Robert Manners left Bloxholm to his brother George, High Sheriff of Lincolnshire in 1826, whose death occurred in 1828. Both brothers having died unmarried, George left the estate to their dearest cousin, Mrs Jenney. She was the daughter of John, second Duke of Rutland, and sister of Lord Robert Manners, the father of Robert and George, making her their first cousin, once removed. However, Lady Mary Bruce (her husband being Robert Nisbet-Hamilton who changed his surname from Christopher) who was the brothers’ great niece, and eldest daughter of the 7th Earl of Elgin, contested the will, saying George had changed his will in her favour, and took the matter to court. A relative of the brothers wrote to the Editor of the Stamford Mercury on 26 March 1841 making it very clear that the family knew George wanted Bloxholm to go to Mrs Jenney, writing: for it is the opinion of all who are acquainted with the circumstances, that the testator would never have made an alteration had he been in the full possession of his faculties. The matter was settled in favour of Lady Mary Bruce.

Parliament of Great Britain
Preceded by George Crowle; Harry Pulteney	Member of Parliament for Kingston upon Hull; 1747–1782; With: Thomas Carter 1747–1754; Richard Crowle 1754–1757; Sir George Montgomery Metham 1757–1766; William Weddell 1766–1774; David Hartley 1774–1780; William Wilberforce 1780–1782	Succeeded by William Wilberforce; David Hartley
Military offices
Preceded by Duke of Cumberland	Colonel of the 15th Light Dragoons; 1748–1749	(Disbanded)
Preceded by James Fleming	Colonel of the 36th Regiment of Foot; 1751–1765	Succeeded by Sir Richard Pierson
Preceded by Sir Charles Howard	Colonel of the 3rd (The Prince of Wales's) Dragoon Guards; 1765–1782	Succeeded by Philip Honywood
