= Michael Warton (died 1645) =

English politician

Michael Warton (23 October 1593 – 1645) was an English politician who sat in the House of Commons between 1640 and 1644. He fought and died on the Royalist side in the English Civil War.

Warton was the son of Sir Michael Warton and his wife Elizabeth Hansby, daughter of Sir Ralph Hansby.

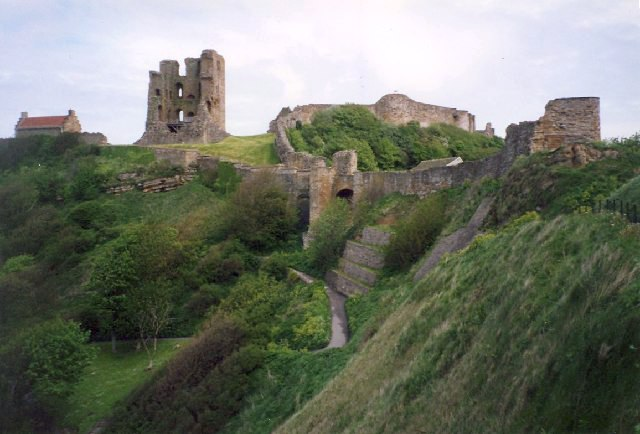
The entire west wall, roof, and interior floors of Scarborough Castle's keep were destroyed in 1645 by artillery bombardment during the English Civil War.

In April 1640, Warton was elected Member of Parliament for Beverley in the Short Parliament. He was re-elected in November 1640 for the Long Parliament and sat until he was disabled from sitting in parliament in 1644 for supporting the King. Warton was killed in 1645 by a cannon shot at the Great Siege of Scarborough Castle which was a garrison for the King.

Warton married to Catherine Maltby daughter of Christopher Maltby at Cottingham on 1 October 1620.

Parliament of England
Parliament suspended since 1629	Member of Parliament for Beverley; 1640–1644; With: Sir John Hotham, 1st Baronet	Succeeded by John Nelthorpe; James Nelthorpe
