= Sir John Hotham, 2nd Baronet =

English politician

Sir John Hotham, 2nd Baronet (21 March 1632 – 29 March 1689) was an English politician who sat in the House of Commons from 1660 to 1685 and in 1689.

Hotham was the son of Captain John Hotham. He inherited the baronetcy in 1645 after his father and grandfather the 1st Baronet were executed by the Parliamentarians during the English Civil War.

In 1660, Hotham was elected Member of Parliament for Beverley in the Convention Parliament. He was re-elected MP for Beverley in 1661 for the Cavalier Parliament and sat until 1685. He was re-elected MP for Beverley in 1689 and sat until his death. He was Custos Rotulorum of the East Riding of Yorkshire from 1660 to 1680.

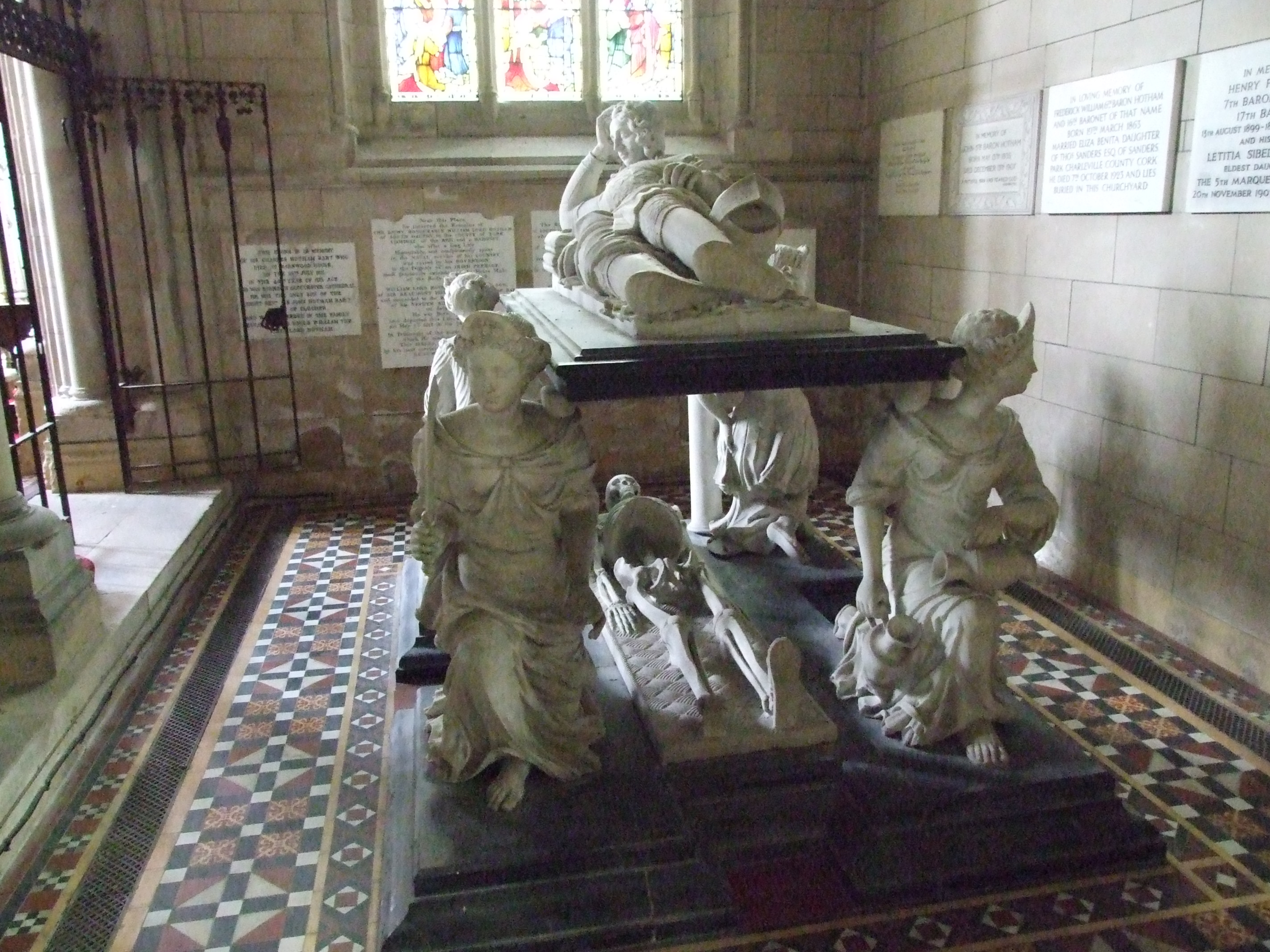
Monument to Hotham at South Dalton church

== Death ==
Hotham died at the age of 57 and was buried at St Mary's Church, South Dalton where there is a large monument. He is represented in life, as a reclining knight in full armour, with his helmet and gauntlet beside him, and in death, as a skeleton. Supporting the four corners of the tomb are statues representing the cardinal virtues.

== Family ==
Hotham married Elizabeth, daughter of Sapcote Beaumont, 2nd Viscount Beaumont of Swords. Their son, John, inherited the baronetcy briefly before the baronetcy passed to a cousin Charles.

Baronetage of England
Preceded by John Hotham	Baronet (of Scorborough); 1645–1689	Succeeded by John Hotham
