= Listed buildings in Hotham, East Riding of Yorkshire =

Hotham is a civil parish in the county of the East Riding of Yorkshire, England. It contains 17 listed buildings that are recorded in the National Heritage List for England. Of these, one is listed at Grade II*, the middle of the three grades, and the others are at Grade II, the lowest grade. The parish contains the village of Hotham and the surrounding countryside. Most of the listed buildings are houses and associated structures, and the others include a church, a farmhouse and farm building, a war memorial and a telephone kiosk.

== Key ==
| Grade | Criteria |
|---|---|
| II* | Particularly important buildings of more than special interest |
| II | Buildings of national importance and special interest |

== Buildings ==
| Name and location | Photograph | Date | Notes | Grade |
|---|---|---|---|---|
| St Oswald's Church; 53.79984°N 0.64352°W | | Early 12th century | The church has been altered and extended through the centuries. It is built in stone, with an extension in brick to the nave, and a Broseley tile roof. The church consists of a nave with an extension to the north, a south porch, a chancel with a north vestry, and a Norman west tower. The tower is broad and squat, and contains a round-arched west doorway with two moulded orders on scalloped capitals. Above it is a two-light pointed window breaking a zigzag band running along three sides of the tower. The bell openings have round-arched heads, and on the south front is a clock face. | II* |
| Foxglove Cottage; 53.79808°N 0.64452°W | — | 17th century (probable) | The house is in whitewashed stone with a Roman tile roof, a single storey and an attic. On the front are two doorways, a sash window and a casement window. Above is a raking roof dormer with a sash window. | II |
| 30 Main Street; 53.79671°N 0.64402°W | | Late 17th century | The house is in colourwashed stone, and has a pantile roof with raised and tumbled gable ends. There is a single storey and three bays, and a rounded corner on the right. On the front are a doorway with a fanlight and sash windows. | II |
| Rectory Farmhouse; 53.79752°N 0.64435°W | — | 1716 | The house, which was enlarged in 1772–73, is in stone and brick, with a hipped pantile roof. There are two storeys and three bays. The doorway has pilasters and a dentilled entablature, and the windows are sashes under segmental arches. | II |
| South Carr Farmhouse; 53.78524°N 0.69497°W | | Early to mid-18th century | The farmhouse is in whitewashed brick, and has a pantile roof with raised gable ends and tumbled brick. There are two storeys and three bays, and a rear cross-wing and outshut. In the centre of the front is a timber gabled porch, flanked by casement windows under segmental arches. The upper floor contains two-light horizontal sliding sash windows. | II |
| Church Farmhouse; 53.79929°N 0.64396°W | | Mid-18th century | The house is in stone, the rear range in stone and brick, and it has a pantile roof with raised gable ends and tumbled brick. There are two storeys and four bays, and a parallel range at the rear. The doorway has a rectangular fanlight, above it is a false window, and the other windows are tripartite sashes. All the openings have segmental heads. | II |
| The Bungalow; 53.79456°N 0.64200°W | | 18th century (probable) | The house, later extended to the rear, is in stone, partly rendered, and has a half-hipped pantile roof. There is one storey and attics, and three bays, and along the front is a later verandah on uncut posts. On the front is a doorway, and the windows are horizontally sliding sashes. | II |
| Barn, South Carr Farm; 53.78547°N 0.69477°W | | Mid to late 18th century | The barn is in brick, and has a pantile roof with raised gable ends and tumbled brick. There are two storeys and five bays. It contains a full-height opening, a door under a segmental arch to the right, a pitching door above to the left, and two rows of rectangular vents. | II |
| Hill House; 53.80051°N 0.63684°W | | Late 18th century | The house is in brick, and has a pantile roof with stone gable coping and shaped kneelers. There are two storeys, three bays, and a single-storey wing to the right. The doorway has a fanlight, and the windows are sashes, those on the wing horizontally sliding. All the openings have segmental-arched heads. | II |
| The Old Rectory; 53.79963°N 0.64280°W | — | Late 18th century | The house is in limestone, and has a Westmorland slate roof with gable coping and shaped kneelers. There are two storeys, a three-bay main central range, and flanking single-bay wings, the right recessed. On the front of the main range is a wooden porch, and the windows are tripartite sashes under flat stone arches. The wings contain tripartite sash and Diocletian windows. | II |
| Hotham House; 53.79605°N 0.64226°W | — | Early 19th century | The house, which possibly incorporates a fragment of an 18th-century house, is rendered and has a slate roof. It consists of a main range with two storeys and five bays, and two-bay pedimented wings. The main range has vermiculated quoins, a floor band, and a modillion eaves course. On the front is a triangular porch, with a single ringed column, and an entablature with heraldic panels. The pediments of the wings contain oculi and have bracketed raking cornices. The windows throughout are sashes. | II |
| Lawn Cottage; 53.79977°N 0.64400°W | — | Early 19th century | The house is in rendered stone, with a sill band and a Welsh slate roof. There are two storeys and two bays. The central doorway has pilasters and a rectangular fanlight, and the windows are sashes. | II |
| Lawn House, wall and gate 53.79970°N 0.64398°W | — | Early 19th century | The house is in rendered stone, with a sill band, a broad eaves band, and a Welsh slate roof. There are two storeys and three bays. The central doorway has a divided fanlight, and is in a porch with a depressed pediment. The windows are sashes in architraves, those on the upper floor with cornices on consoles. The wall to the left is in stone and brick with coping, it is about 3 metres (9.8 ft) in height, and 7 metres (23 ft) in length. It contains a round arch with a keystone and a cast iron gate. Flanking the arch and at the ends are capped piers. | II |
| The Grange; 53.79696°N 0.64414°W | — | Early 19th century | The house is in stone with a Welsh slate roof. There are two storeys and four bays, and the gable end faces the street. On the front is a gabled porch, and the windows are sashes under flat stone arches. | II |
| Wold View; 53.79883°N 0.64393°W | — | Early 19th century | The house is in whitewashed stone, with paired gutter brackets, and a hipped roof of Roman tile and pantile. There are two storeys, a square plan, and three bays. The doorway is in the centre, and the windows are sashes. The ground floor openings have wedge lintels and keystones. | II |
| War memorial 53.79769°N 0.64411°W | | c. 1920 | The war memorial is on a triangular patch at a T-junction. It is in stone, and consists of an obelisk on a base, and is about 5 metres (16 ft) in height. The base is square and tapering, and carries an inscription around a wreath in relief. On the obelisk are the names of those who served and those who were lost in the First World War. | II |
| Telephone kiosk 53.79759°N 0.64428°W | | 1935 | The telephone kiosk on Rectory Lane is of the K6 type designed by Giles Gilbert Scott. Constructed in cast iron with a square plan and a dome, it has three unperforated crowns in the top panels. | II |
