= Thomas Carter (Hull MP) =

English politician

Thomas Carter (c. 1714 – 3 June 1767) was an English politician. He was a Member of Parliament (MP) for Kingston upon Hull from 1747 to 1754.

Parliament of Great Britain
Preceded by George Crowle; Harry Pulteney	Member of Parliament for Kingston upon Hull; 1747–1754; With: Lord Robert Manners	Succeeded by Lord Robert Manners; Richard Crowle
