= 74th Regiment of Foot =

Infantry regiment of the British Army

The 74th Regiment of Foot was an infantry regiment of the British Army from 1758 to 1763.

== History ==
It was formed raised in August 1756 at Newcastle upon Tyne as the 2nd Battalion of the 36th Regiment of Foot and saw service in the British Expedition against Fort Louis.

By an order signed on June 15th, 1758, the Battalion was renamed 74th Regiment of Foot. After the success of the Goree expedition four companies of the new 74th were assigned garrison duty in Saint-Louis, Senegal. The others left in July 1758 and saw service in the Jamaica during the Second Maroon War. They were disbanded in Jamaica in 1763.

== Uniform ==
The 74th Foot had deep green facings, like the 36th Foot.

== Regimental Colonels ==
- 1758–1761: Maj-Gen. Hon. Sharrington Talbot
- 1761–1763: John Irwin
