= Baron Hotham =

Title in the Peerage of Ireland

Arms of Hotham: Barry of ten argent and azure, on a canton or a Cornish chough proper

Sir John Hotham, 1st Baronet

Baron Hotham, of South Dalton in the County of York, is a title in the Peerage of Ireland. It was created in 1797 for the naval commander Admiral William Hotham, with remainder to the heirs male of his father. Hotham was the third son of Sir Beaumont Hotham, 7th Baronet, of Scorborough (see below), and in 1811 he also succeeded his nephew as eleventh Baronet. Lord Hotham never married and on his death in 1813 he was succeeded in both titles by his younger brother Beaumont, the second Baron and twelfth Baronet. He had previously represented Wigan in the House of Commons.

Beaumont Hotham, 3rd Baron Hotham, grandson of the second Baron, fought at the Battle of Waterloo and was later a General in the Army and sat as a Member of Parliament. He died unmarried and was succeeded by his nephew, the fourth Baron, the son of Rear-Admiral George Frederick Hotham, brother of the third Baron. He, like his successor and younger brother, the fifth Baron, died unmarried. The latter was succeeded by his first cousin once removed, the sixth Baron. He was the son of Reverend William Francis Hotham, second son of the second Baron.

On the death of the sixth Baron, that line of the family also failed and the titles passed to his first cousin twice removed, the seventh Baron. He was the great-grandson of the third son of the third Baron. As of 2013 the titles are held by his third son, the eighth Baron, who succeeded in 1967.

The Baronetcy, of Scorborough in the County of York, was created in the Baronetage of England in 1622 for John Hotham. Both he and his son, John Hotham the younger, were beheaded by the Parliamentarians in 1645. The title was inherited by the latter's son John, the second Baronet. Both he and his son, the third Baronet, represented Beverley in Parliament. The third Baron was succeeded by his cousin, the fourth Baronet. He sat as Member of Parliament for Scarborough and Beverley. His son, the fifth Baronet, also represented Beverley in the House of Commons. He was succeeded by his son, the sixth Baronet.

On his death in 1767 the line of the fifth Baronet failed and the title passed to the late Baronet's uncle, the seventh Baronet. His eldest son, the eighth Baronet, a Lieutenant-General in the Army, represented St Ives in Parliament and also assumed the additional surname of Thompson. When he died the titles passed to his younger brother, the ninth Baronet. He served as Lord Bishop of Clogher. He was succeeded by his son, the tenth Baronet. On his death in 1811 the title was inherited by the aforementioned eleventh Baronet, who had already been elevated to the peerage as Baron Hotham.

The family seat is Dalton Hall, Beverley, East Riding of Yorkshire.

== Hotham Baronets of Scorborough (1622) ==
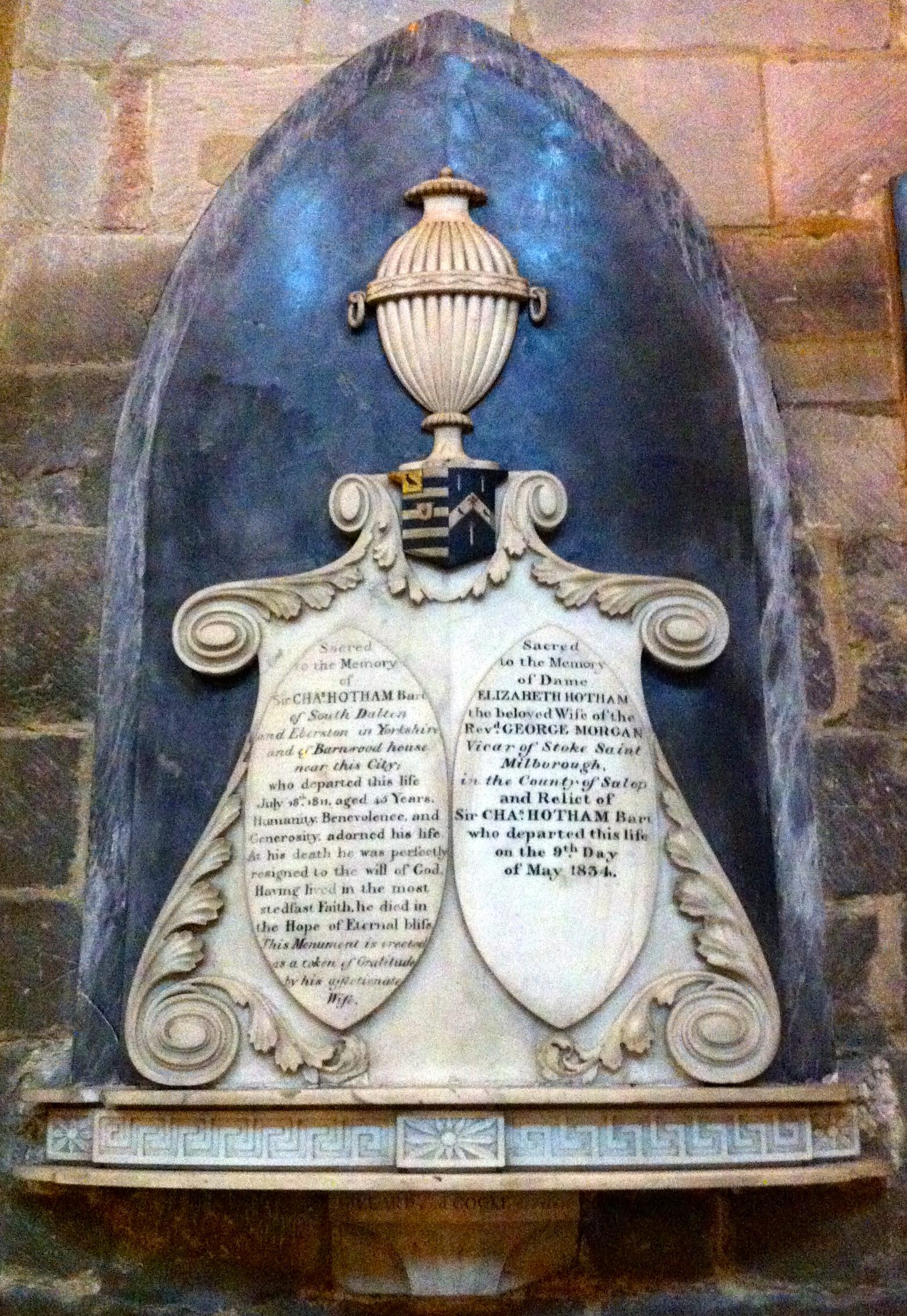
Monument to Sir Charles Hotham, 10th Baronet, Gloucester Cathedral

- Sir John Hotham, 1st Baronet (died 1645)
- Sir John Hotham, 2nd Baronet (1632–1689)
- Sir John Hotham, 3rd Baronet (1655–1691)
- Sir Charles Hotham, 4th Baronet (c. 1663–1723)
- Sir Charles Hotham, 5th Baronet (1693–1738)
- Sir Charles Hotham, 6th Baronet (died 1767)
- Sir Beaumont Hotham, 7th Baronet (died 1771)
- Sir Charles Hotham-Thompson, 8th Baronet (1729–1794)
- Sir John Hotham, 9th Baronet (1734–1795)
- Sir Charles Hotham, 10th Baronet (1766–1811)
- Sir William Hotham, 11th Baronet (1736–1813) (had been created Baron Hotham in 1797)

== Barons Hotham (1797) ==
- William Hotham, 1st Baron Hotham (1736–1813)
- Beaumont Hotham, 2nd Baron Hotham (1737–1814)
- Beaumont Hotham, 3rd Baron Hotham (1794–1870)
- Charles Hotham, 4th Baron Hotham (1836–1872)
- John Hotham, 5th Baron Hotham (1838–1907)
- Frederick William Hotham, 6th Baron Hotham (1863–1923)
- Henry Frederick Hotham, 7th Baron Hotham (1899–1967)
- Henry Durand Hotham, 8th Baron Hotham (born 1940)

The heir apparent is the present holder's son Hon. William Beaumont Hotham (born 1972).
The heir apparent's heir apparent is his son Merlin Frederick Hotham (born 2006).
