= Humphrey Bland =

British army officer

Lieutenant-General Humphrey Bland
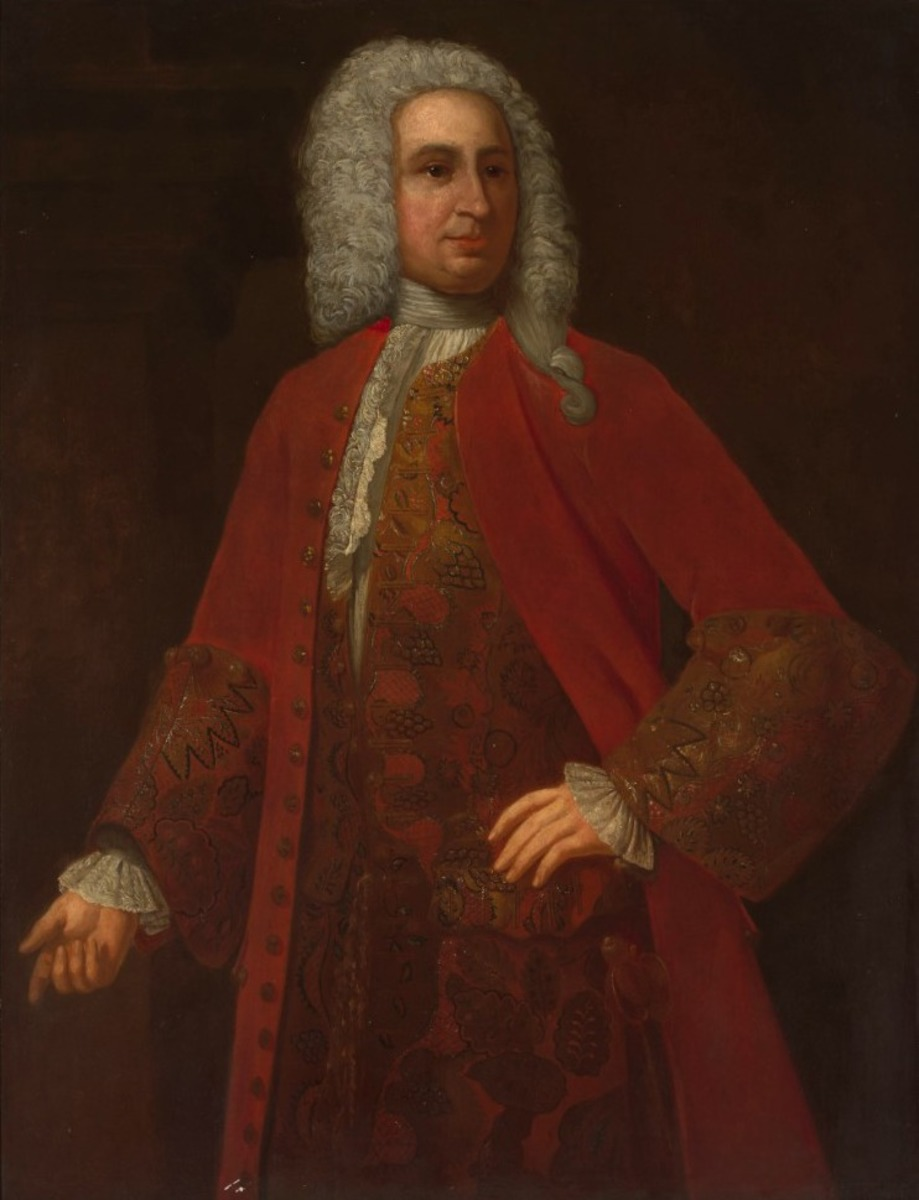
- c. 1750 portrait

Commander-in-Chief, Scotland
- In office 1753–1756

Governor of Edinburgh Castle
- In office 1752–1763

Governor of Gibraltar
- In office March 1749 – May 1754

Governor of Fort William
- In office 1743–1752

Personal details
- Born: 1686 Lisburn, County Down
- Died: 8 May 1763 (aged 76) London, England
- Resting place: Westminster Abbey
- Spouse: Elizabeth Dalrymple (1755-his death)
- Occupation: Soldier and administrator

Military service
- Allegiance: England; Great Britain
- Branch/service: English Army; British Army
- Years of service: 1704–1756
- Rank: Lieutenant-general
- Commands: 2nd King's Own Horse
- Battles/wars: War of the Spanish Succession; Siege of Alicante; Battle of Almenar; Jacobite rising of 1715; Battle of Preston (1715); War of the Austrian Succession; Battle of Dettingen; Battle of Fontenoy; Battle of Lauffeld; Jacobite rising of 1745; Battle of Falkirk Muir; Battle of Culloden

Lieutenant-General Humphrey Bland (1686 – 8 May 1763) was a British army officer. His military career began in 1704 during the War of the Spanish Succession and ended in 1756. First published in 1727, his Treatise of Military Discipline was the most successful and widely used military drillbook to appear in English during the 18th century. It was reprinted nine times between 1727 and 1762, George Washington being among those who owned copies. He was twice Commander-in-Chief, Scotland, first from 1747 to 1751, then 1753 until 1756, when ill-health forced his retirement. He died in London in 1763.

== Life ==
Humphrey Bland was born in Lisburn circa 1686, second child of Thomas Bland; little is known of his mother, but his father's family settled in Ireland in 1670 and may have been related to the Bland baronets of Kippax in Yorkshire. He was the second of six children, including three sisters, Frances, Anne and Elizabeth.

His elder brother John ended his career in 1715 as Colonel of the 2nd Dragoon Guards; after his retirement, he built Blandsfort in Abbeyleix, County Laois and died unmarried. William was a captain in the 8th Dragoons; he had five children, the eldest son John inheriting Blandsfort.

In 1755, Bland married the much younger Elizabeth Dalrymple, sister of the 5th Earl of Stair and niece of Field Marshal John Dalrymple, 2nd Earl of Stair. He had no legitimate children but acknowledged paternity of Martha Maria Beresford.

After his retirement in 1756, he purchased Thistleworth House, in Isleworth, outside London, whose redesign was one of the earliest pieces of work by Scottish architect Robert Adam. As Gordon House, it was greatly expanded by the Earl of Kilmorey in 1868. He died here on 8 May 1763 and his property split between Martha, Elizabeth and his nephew, General Thomas Bland (died 1816).

== Career ==
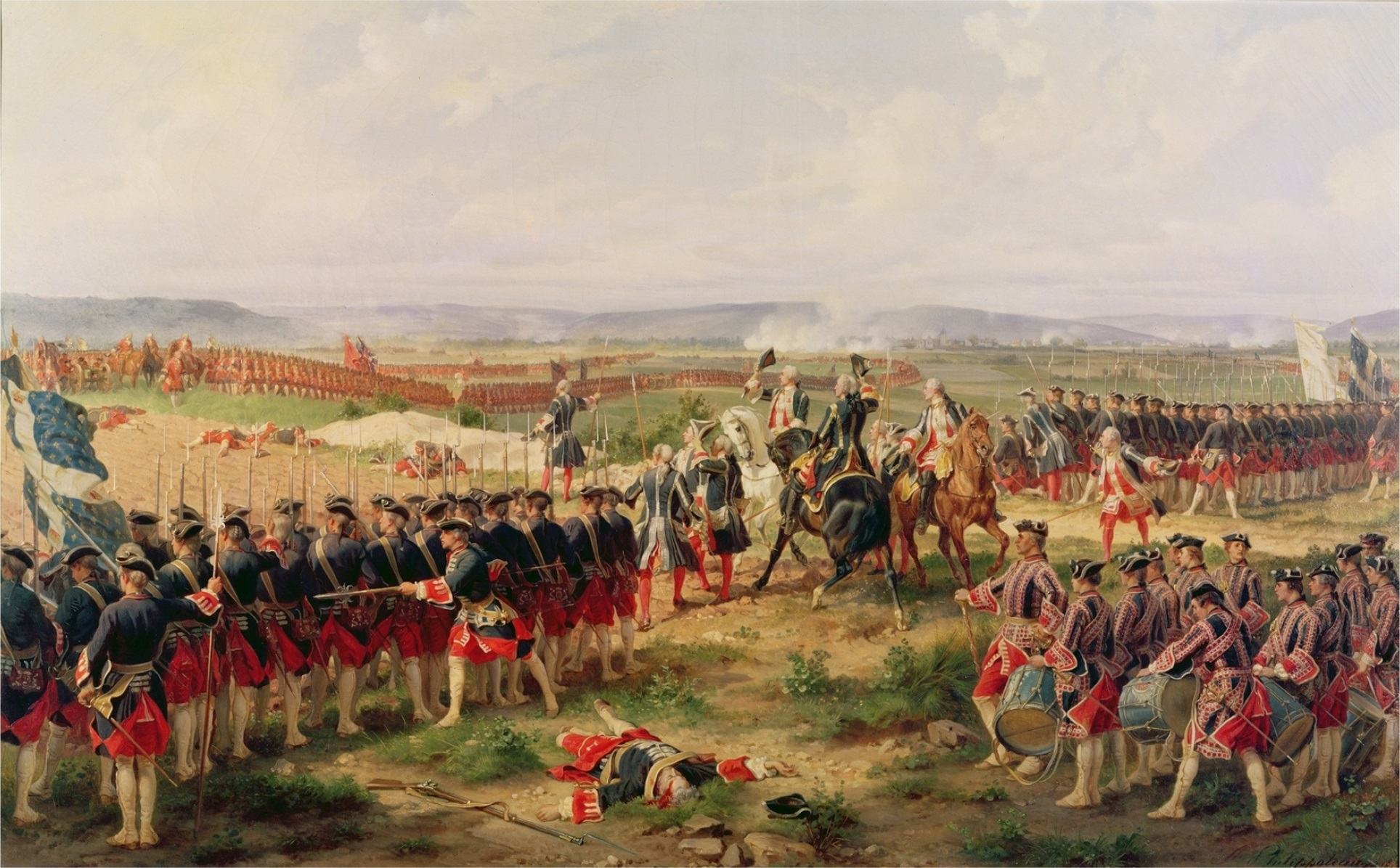
Bland fought at the Battle of Fontenoy in May 1745, Cumberland's first battle

During the War of the Spanish Succession in March 1704, Bland was commissioned as an ensign; Parliamentary accounts show he was Town Major or military administrator for Tortosa, in Catalonia from May to October 1707. In July 1709, he was promoted major in Colonel Frederick Sibourg's Regiment of Foot. This was one of five units raised in April 1705 from exiled French Huguenots.

Sent to Spain, it suffered heavy casualties at the Siege of Alicante in 1709, where Sibourg was killed. Bland's brothers John and William also served with the regiment and all three fought at Almenar in 1710, where Humphrey was wounded. Despite this victory, the Allied war effort in Spain was winding down and it was increasingly difficult to replace losses; the regiment was disbanded in 1712 and Bland placed on half-pay.

In 1715, he was reinstated as major in Honywood's Dragoons, a new regiment raised for the 1715 Jacobite Rising; he was closely connected to Sir Philip Honywood for the rest of his career. After the Battle of Preston, Bland was entrusted with escorting senior Jacobite prisoners to London. He transferred to the Royal Regiment of Dragoons in 1717 and promoted lieutenant-colonel of the 2nd King's Own Horse in 1718.

Britain was at peace from 1715 to 1740 and promotion slow, but Bland made his reputation with the publication in 1727 of A Treatise of Military Discipline. A practical and clearly written work summarising the basic duties of regimental officers, it became the most successful and widely used English drill book of the 18th century and frequently reprinted. George Washington owned a copy and popularised its use with officers of the Virginia militia and later the Continental Army.

Appointed colonel of the 36th Foot in 1737, he transferred to the 13th Dragoons in 1741 and was made Quartermaster-General to the Forces in 1742, a post he held until his death. During the War of the Austrian Succession, he served in the Low Countries, where he commanded the 3rd Dragoons and fought at Dettingen in June 1743. Technically an Allied victory, the battle has been described as 'a happy escape, rather than a great success' and is now chiefly remembered as the last time a ruling British monarch led troops in battle.

It was also the first major action for the Duke of Cumberland, who replaced George Wade as commander in Europe. Bland became part of his small circle of trusted senior officers and commanded a cavalry brigade at Fontenoy in May 1745. In October, he was transferred to Scotland to help suppress the 1745 Jacobite Rising, fighting at Falkirk Muir in January 1746 and Culloden in April.

In early 1747, Bland returned to Europe, where he took part in the Battle of Lauffeld in July, a British defeat saved from disaster by a series of courageous cavalry charges. In September, he replaced the Earl of Albemarle as Commander-in-Chief, Scotland; as an Irish Presbyterian, Bland had little sympathy for the largely Episcopalian Jacobites or Highland culture in general. He worked closely with Lord Milton, a senior Scottish judge who advocated reforming the land tenure system to reduce the power of clan chiefs and introducing industry to improve the general economy. These ideas were summarised in a paper titled Proposals for civilising the Highlands; not all were carried out, but it shaped general policy.

Bland also proposed re-establishing the network of military garrisons set up by Cromwell throughout Scotland, including detailed regulations for their relationships with the surrounding population, including education and intermarriage. This approach to 'converting' a hostile civilian populace was used by his colleague William Blakeney as governor of the Spanish island of Menorca and by Bland himself as Governor of Gibraltar. He has been described as a classic example of senior career soldiers in this period; a 'bluff, methodical, proficient general officer, who took his duties seriously.'

He was appointed Governor of Gibraltar in 1749, a position that did not require residence and was considered a military backwater; however, he asked to be relieved of command in Scotland and moved there in 1751 due to ill-health. When Sir Philip Honywood died in 1752, he succeeded him as colonel of his former regiment, the 1st King's Dragoon Guards and also given the sinecure appointment of Governor of Edinburgh Castle. When his successor in Scotland, George Churchill, died in 1753, he returned from Gibraltar for a second period as Commander-in-Chief before retiring in 1756. He died in London on 8 May 1763.

== Sources ==
- Brumwell, Stephen (2006). Paths of Glory: The Life and Death of General James Wolfe. Hambledon Continuum. ISBN 978-1852855536.
- Costello, Vivien (2008). "Huguenot regiments in the War of the Spanish Succession". Journal of the Society for Army Historical Research. 86 (345).
- Dalton, Charles (1904). English army lists and commission registers, 1661-1714 Volume VI. Eyre & Spottiswood.
- Gruber, Ira (2014). Books and the British Army in the Age of the American Revolution. The University of North Carolina Press. ISBN 978-0807833780.
- Houlding, J.A (2004). "Humphrey Bland". Oxford Dictionary of National Biography (online ed.). Oxford University Press. doi:10.1093/ref:odnb/2607. (Subscription, Wikipedia Library access or UK public library membership required.)
- Knighton, CS, ed. (2006). Calendar of State Papers 1705-1706: Of the Reign of Anne Volume. Boydell Press. ISBN 978-1843832515.
- Royle, Trevor (2016). Culloden; Scotland's Last Battle and the Forging of the British Empire. Little, Brown. ISBN 978-1408704011.
- Shaw, William, ed. (1952). Declared Accounts 1707: Army in Calendar of Treasury Books, Volume 22, 1708. HMSO.
- Wright, John W (1931). "Some Notes on the Continental Army". The William and Mary Quarterly. 11 (2): 82–105. doi:10.2307/1921003. JSTOR 1921003.

Military offices
Preceded by John Moyle	Colonel, 36th Foot; 1737–1741	Succeeded by James Fleming
Preceded by Robert Dalway	Colonel, 13th Dragoons; 1741–1743	Succeeded by James Gardiner
Preceded by John Armstrong	Quartermaster-General to the Forces; 1742–1763	Succeeded by George Morrison
Preceded by Sir Philip Honywood	Colonel, 3rd Dragoons; 1743–1752	Succeeded by Lord Tyrawley
Preceded by George Wade	Governor of Fort William; 1743–1752	Succeeded by Richard Onslow
Preceded by Earl of Albemarle	Commander-in-Chief, Scotland; September 1747 to December 1751	Succeeded by George Churchill
Preceded by William Hargrave	Governor of Gibraltar; 1749–1755	Succeeded by Thomas Fowke
Preceded by Lord Mark Kerr	Governor of Edinburgh Castle; 1752–1763	Succeeded by Earl of Loudoun
Preceded by Sir Philip Honywood	Colonel, King's Dragoon Guards; 1752–1763	Succeeded by John Mostyn
Preceded by George Churchill	Commander-in-Chief, Scotland; November 1753 to July 1756	Succeeded by Lord George Beauclerk
