= John Moyle (British Army officer) =

Major-General John Moyle (died 3 November 1738) was an officer of the British Army.

== Biography ==
Moyle entered the Army on 4 January 1696 as a captain in the Royal Regiment of Ireland. He served with reputation under the Duke of Marlborough, and was present at the Battle of Blenheim. On 12 April 1706 he was made lieutenant-colonel of Colonel Roger Townshend's newly raised regiment of infantry, and on 13 April 1707 he was promoted to the brevet rank of colonel in the Army. At the peace of Utrecht in 1713 his regiment was disbanded, and he was placed on half-pay, but in 1715 he was made lieutenant-colonel of Colonel William Newton's Regiment of Dragoons. Colonel Moyle was advanced to the rank of brigadier-general on 13 March 1727. On 14 May 1732 King George II conferred the colonelcy of the 36th Regiment of Foot on Brigadier-General Moyle, who was promoted to the rank of major-general on 5 November 1735. On 27 June 1737 he was removed to the 22nd Regiment of Foot. Major-General Moyle died on 3 November 1738.

Military offices
Preceded by Charles Lenoe	Colonel of the 36th Regiment of Foot; 1732–1737	Succeeded by Humphrey Bland
Preceded by James St Clair	Colonel of the 22nd Regiment of Foot; 1737–1738	Succeeded by Thomas Paget
