= Durant Hotham =

Durant Hotham (1617?–1691), was a biographer.

== Biography ==
Hotham was fifth son by his second marriage of Sir John Hotham, of Scorborough, Yorkshire He was admitted to Christ's College, Cambridge, 7 May 1632, aged 15.

Hotham became involved in his father's and elder brother's (John Hotham, the younger) disgrace, his letters and papers were seized (June 1643), and he was summoned to attend parliament. After being examined, he was soon discharged, and his property restored to him, though he received strict injunctions not to join his father.

For many years he lived at Lockington in the East Riding of Yorkshire, engaged in scientific pursuits. As justice of the peace he officiated at the marriage of his brother Charles at Wigan on 15 September 1656. He died in the parish of St James, Westminster, in 1691, and was buried in the church

== Works ==
He wrote a "Life of Jacob Boehme", published in two different editions in 1654, interesting for its literary style. His translation of his brother's Charles's "Ad Philosophiam Teutonicam Manuductio" was issued in 1650 as "englished by D. F". (i.e. Durant Frater).

== Family ==
On 23 August 1645 Hotham married Frances (1625–1693), daughter of Richard Remington of Lund, Yorkshire, and with her had seven sons and four daughters, all of whom died young.
