= John Pocock =

British Army general

Brigadier-General John Pocock
- Died: April 1732 Leicester Fields, London, England

Brigadier-General John Pocock (died April 1732) was a British Army officer and a Colonel of the King's Regiment of Foot.

== Life ==
Pocock obtained a commission in a regiment of foot in June 1695, and having signalised himself in the wars of Queen Anne, he was promoted to the rank of colonel in the Army in 1707. In 1710 he succeeded Lord Strathnaver in the colonelcy of a regiment of foot, with which he served in Flanders under the Duke of Marlborough, and afterwards under the Duke of Ormonde. At the Peace of Utrecht his regiment was disbanded, but in 1715 he was commissioned to raise a regiment of foot for the service of King George I. After the suppression of the rebellion of the Earl of Mar, this regiment was sent to Ireland, where it was disbanded in 1718. On 2 December 1720 Pocock was appointed to the colonelcy of the 36th Regiment of Foot, from which he was removed on 21 April 1721 to the 8th, or King's Regiment. On the expectation that Great Britain would become involved in a continental war, in 1727, he was promoted to the rank of brigadier-general. He died in April 1732 at his house in Leicester Fields, London.

Military offices
Preceded by Sir Charles Hotham	Colonel of Pocock's Regiment of Foot; 1720–1721	Succeeded by Charles Lenoe
Preceded by Sir Charles Hotham	Colonel of the King's Regiment of Foot; 1721–1732	Succeeded by Charles Lenoe
