= 36th (Herefordshire) Regiment of Foot =

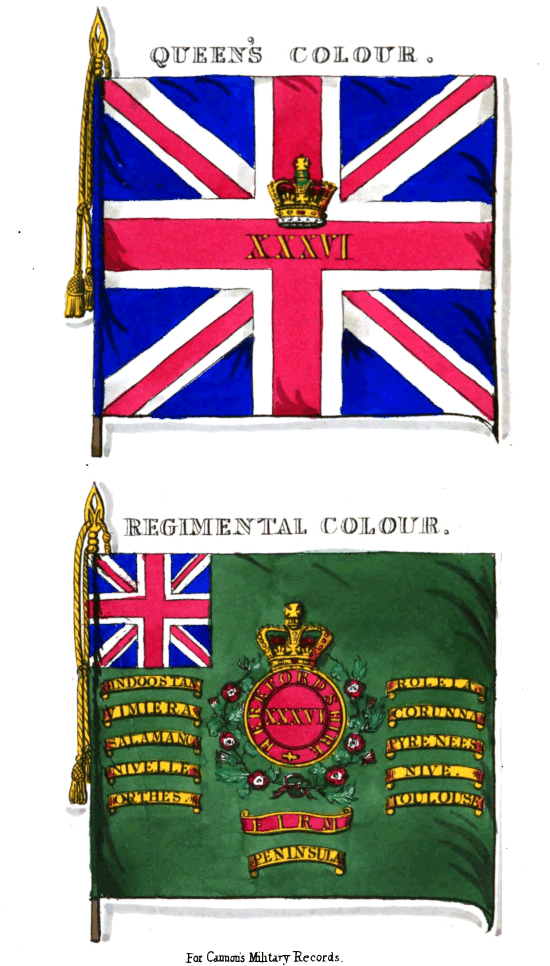
- Colours of the 36th Foot in 1853
- Active: 1701–1881
- Country: Kingdom of England (1689–1707); Kingdom of Great Britain (1707–1800); United Kingdom (1801–1881)
- Branch: British Army
- Type: Infantry
- Size: 1 battalion (2 battalions 1756–1758, 1804–1814)
- Garrison/HQ: Norton Barracks, Worcestershire
- Nicknames: "The Grasshoppers" "The Saucy Greens"
- Colours: Green Facings
- March: The Poacher
- Engagements: War of the Spanish Succession; Jacobite rising War of Jenkins' Ear; War of the Austrian Succession; Seven Years' War; Third Anglo-Mysore War; Napoleonic Wars; Peninsular War

The 36th (Herefordshire) Regiment of Foot was an infantry regiment of the British Army, raised in 1701. Under the Childers Reforms it amalgamated with the 29th (Worcestershire) Regiment of Foot to form the Worcestershire Regiment in 1881. Its lineage is continued today by the Mercian Regiment.

== History ==
=== Formation ===
The unit was raised on the outbreak of the War of the Spanish Succession: on 28 June 1701 William III issued a warrant to William Caulfeild, 2nd Viscount Charlemont to raise a regiment of foot in Ireland. It was the successor to a previous regiment raised by Charlemont in 1694 for Irish service. William died in March 1702 and his successor, Queen Anne, issued a further warrant declaring that Charlemont's Regiment of Foot was to be one of six newly formed regiments to be equipped for "sea service".

=== Early service: the War of the Spanish Succession ===
The regiment was selected to form part of an Anglo-Dutch force under the command of the Duke of Ormonde that was to make an assault of the southern coast of Spain. They moved from Ireland to the Isle of Wight in June 1702, embarking for Cádiz in the following month. They landed on 15 August, but the force failed to take the City of Cadiz, and the regiment left Spain on 24 September, sailing for the West Indies. They returned to Ireland in 1704.

In April 1705 Charlemont's Regiment left Ireland once more, forming part of an expeditionary force led by the Earl of Peterborough. The force landed in Catalonia in August, and the regiment took part in the Siege of Barcelona, with the city falling in October. In April 1706 the regiment helped relieve Barcelona which was under siege by a Franco-Spanish force. On 10 May 1706 Viscount Charlemont was replaced as colonel by Thomas Allnutt, within the unit becoming Allnutt's Regiment of Foot. Allnutt's Regiment was engaged in a number of minor engagements in Valencia and Murcia throughout the rest of 1706. In April 1707 they became part of a force of English, Portuguese, Dutch and Spanish troops under the command of the Marquis of Minas and Earl of Galway, suffering defeat at the Battle of Almansa. The regiment was nearly destroyed, with Colonel Allnutt wounded and taken prisoner.

In September 1707 Allnutt was permitted to return to England as part of a prisoner exchange. He was instructed to obtain to travel to Cheshire to enlist new recruits to rebuild his regiment, with Chester and Nantwich chosen as the places of enlistment. This was recognised as an effective re-raising of the regiment. On the death of Thomas Alnutt on 7 May 1708, Archibald Campbell, Earl of Ilay, become colonel on 23 March 1709, with the unit becoming the Earl of Ilay's Regiment of Foot. In 1710 Ilay resigned and the unit became Disney's Regiment of Foot when Henry Disney became colonel on 23 October.

In 1711 Disney's Regiment was part of a 5,000 strong force dispatched to North America as part of the Quebec Expedition. On 30 July they sailed from Boston for the St Lawrence River. The expedition ended in failure, and Disney's Regiment returned to England, arriving in Portsmouth on 9 October.

In 1712 Louis XIV of France signed a peace treaty with Queen Anne of Great Britain. As part of the provisions, Louis ceded the Port of Dunkirk, and Disney's Regiment landed there on 8 July, relieving the French garrison. They were stationed in Dunkirk when the Treaty of Utrecht ending the war, was signed in the following year.

=== 1715 Jacobite rising ===
In the spring of 1714 Disney's Regiment returned to England, proceeding later in the year to Ireland where it was transferred onto the Irish Establishment, an arrangement that allowed for both lower rates of pay and a smaller number of troops. On 11 July 1715 William Egerton was appointed colonel of the regiment, which thus became Egerton's Regiment of Foot. When the Jacobite rising broke out in Scotland in August 1715, Egerton's Regiment moved to Stirling under the command of the Duke of Argyll. They fought in the largely inconclusive Battle of Sheriffmuir where they were overrun and forced to retreat. The regiment remained in Scotland until 1718, based in Stirling and Dumbarton.

In 1718 the regiment returned to Ireland, and in the following year moved to England where they became Hotham's Regiment of Foot when Sir Charles Hotham, 4th Baronet became colonel. They returned to Ireland in 1720. The regiment remained on garrison duties in Ireland and England until 1739, changing its name as new colonels were appointed: Pocock's Regiment of Foot (John Pocock) in December 1720, Lenoe's Regiment of Foot (Charles Lenoe) in 1721, Moyle's Regiment of Foot (Brigadier General John Moyle) in 1732 and Bland's Regiment of Foot (Humphrey Bland).

=== War of Jenkins' Ear ===
During 1739 tensions rose between Great Britain and the Spanish Empire. Bland's Regiment was recalled from Ireland to England in September 1739 and war broke out on 23 October 1739. In 1740 they sailed to the West Indies, arriving in Dominica where there were large losses due to dysentery. On 9 January 1741 James Fleming became colonel, and the renamed Fleming's Regiment of Foot arrived in Jamaica later in the month. The regiment took part in the unsuccessful two-month-long assault on Cartagena. They returned to Great Britain in 1743.

=== War of the Austrian Succession ===
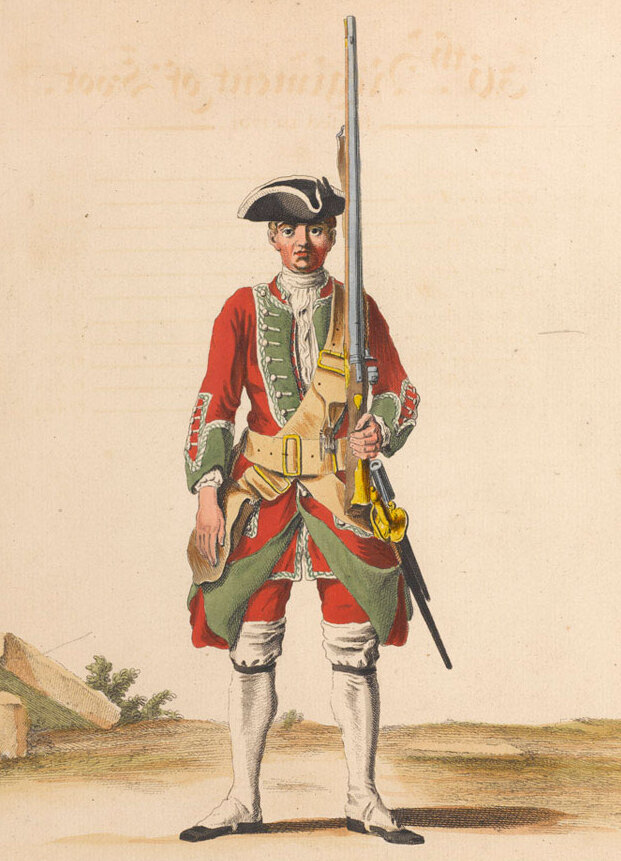
c. 1742 engraving of a regimental private

c. 1751 painting of a regimental grenadier (right)

By 1744 Britain found itself involved in a wider conflict, the War of the Austrian Succession. Fleming's Regiment was dispatched to Flanders where the formed part of the garrison of Ghent. In the following year there was a second Jacobite rising in Scotland, reaching Edinburgh by January 1746. They fought at the Battle of Falkirk and played a small part in the Battle of Culloden that ended the uprising. In the following year the regiment returned to Flanders where they were part of the force under the Duke of Cumberland defeated by the French at the Battle of Lauffeld. The unit took part in a number of minor operations until the war was ended by the Treaty of Aix-la-Chapelle in October 1748.

The regiment returned to England in 1749 where its establishment was reduced before it was sent to Gibraltar to form part of the garrison there. Following the death of James Fleming, Lord Robert Manners became colonel in March 1751.

=== Numbering ===
On 1 July 1751 a royal warrant was issued which provided that in future regiments would no longer be known by their colonel's name, but would bear a regimental number based on their precedence. Lord Manners' Regiment duly became the 36th Regiment of Foot. In 1754 the 36th Foot returned to Great Britain, stationed in Scotland until late 1755 when they moved to southern England.

=== Seven Years' War ===
On 18 May 1756 Britain declared war on France, beginning a conflict that became known as the Seven Years' War. On 25 August, the 36 Foot was authorised to raise a second battalion. The two battalions were encamped as part of a defensive force at Barham Downs, Kent. In 1758 the second battalion was reconstituted as the 74th Regiment of Foot. The 74th saw service in Senegal and Jamaica until its disbandment in 1763. In 1758 the 36th moved to the Isle of Wight as part of a force under the command of Major-General John Mostyn formed to make raids on the north French coast. They took part in a number of assaults in Brittany and Normandy during 1758 and 1759 and again in the Capture of Belle Île in 1761. The Treaty of Paris of 1763 brought the war in Europe to an end.

=== 1763–1782 ===
The 36th Foot left England in March 1764 for Jamaica where they remained until 1773. The regiment was not involved in the American War of Independence that broke out in 1775, being stationed in Ireland from September 1775 until 1782.

On 21 August 1782, the Commander-in-Chief of the Forces, Henry Seymour Conway, issued a regulation giving an English county designation to each regiment of foot other than those with a royal title or highland regiments. The intention was to improve recruitment during the unpopular American War, and the Home Secretary, Thomas Townshend issued a circular letter to the lieutenants of each county in England in the following terms:

My Lord,
The very great deficiency of men in the regiments of infantry being so very detrimental to the public service, the king has thought proper to give the names of the different counties to the old corps, in hopes that, by the zeal and activity of the principal nobility and gentry in the several counties, some considerable assistance may be given towards recruiting these regiments".

The 36th Foot took a county title as the 36th (Herefordshire) Regiment of Foot.

=== India ===
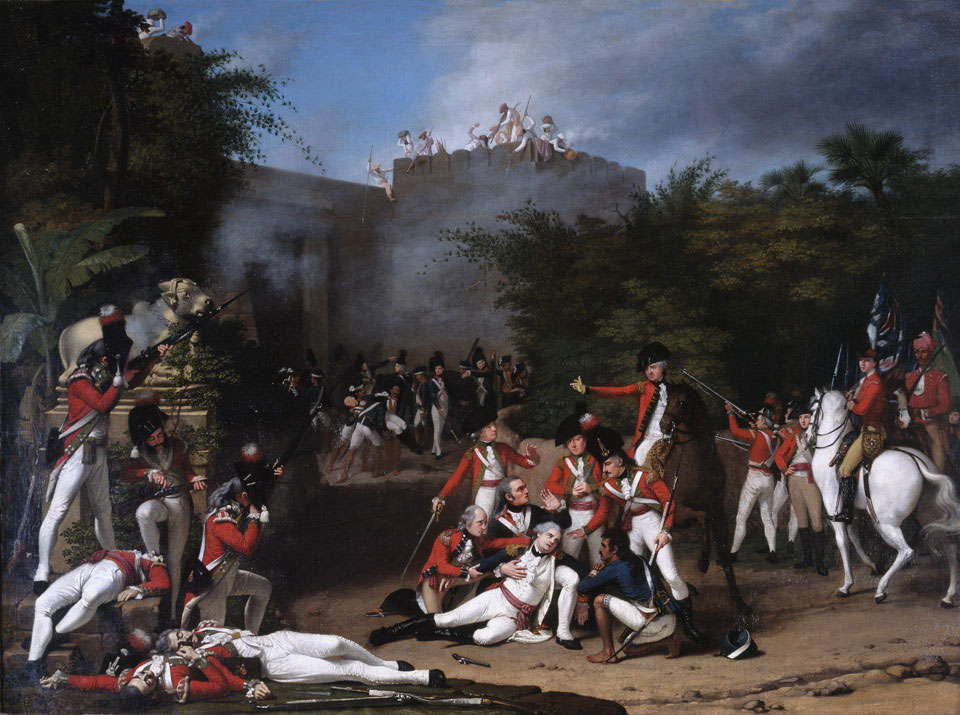
The siege of Bangalore, which the regiment fought in

In March 1783 the 36th Foot embarked on ships in Portsmouth, arriving in Madras in July. The Second Anglo-Mysore War was entering its closing stages and the regiment took part in the relief of Cannonore in December 1783. The war was ended by the Treaty of Mangalore in March 1784. The 36th Foot remained in India, and in December 1789 the Third Anglo-Mysore War commenced. They saw service at the siege of Bangalore in 1791. The war ended in March 1792 with the signing of the Treaty of Seringapatam.

In February 1793 Revolutionary France declared war on Great Britain, and in May 1793 the 36th Foot was ordered to move into French India. It took part in the capture of Pondicherry in August 1793, and remained in India until 1798. They left India in October 1798, but did not reach England until July 1799, spending three months in Saint Helena due to shortage of convoy ships.

=== Napoleonic Wars 1800–1808 ===
The 36th Foot was brought up to strength in Winchester by recruits from the militia before moving to Ireland in January 1800. They formed part of an expeditionary force under the command of Brigadier-General Thomas Maitland which sailed from Cork in June 1800, carried out a number of raids on the French coast. In July 1800 the 36th Foot moved to the island of Menorca in the Mediterranean Sea, which had surrendered to the British in 1798. The Treaty of Amiens, signed in March 1802, brought a temporary cessation of hostilities. As part of the treaty's terms Menorca became a Spanish possession, and in August 1802 the regiment returned to Ireland. On 29 June 1804 the 36th Foot was authorised to raise a second battalion, recruiting in County Durham. The battalion was formally placed on the army establishment on Christmas Day 1804, but saw no foreign service and was disbanded in 1814. In early 1806 the 1st Battalion 36th Foot was briefly part of the Hanover Expedition. In autumn 1806 the battalion was selected to form part of a special force under the command of Major-General Robert Craufurd. The brigade left Falmouth in November 1806 in great secrecy, eventually reaching South America in the following year where they took part in the attack on Buenos Aires. The 1st Battalion returned to Ireland in December 1807.

=== Peninsular War ===
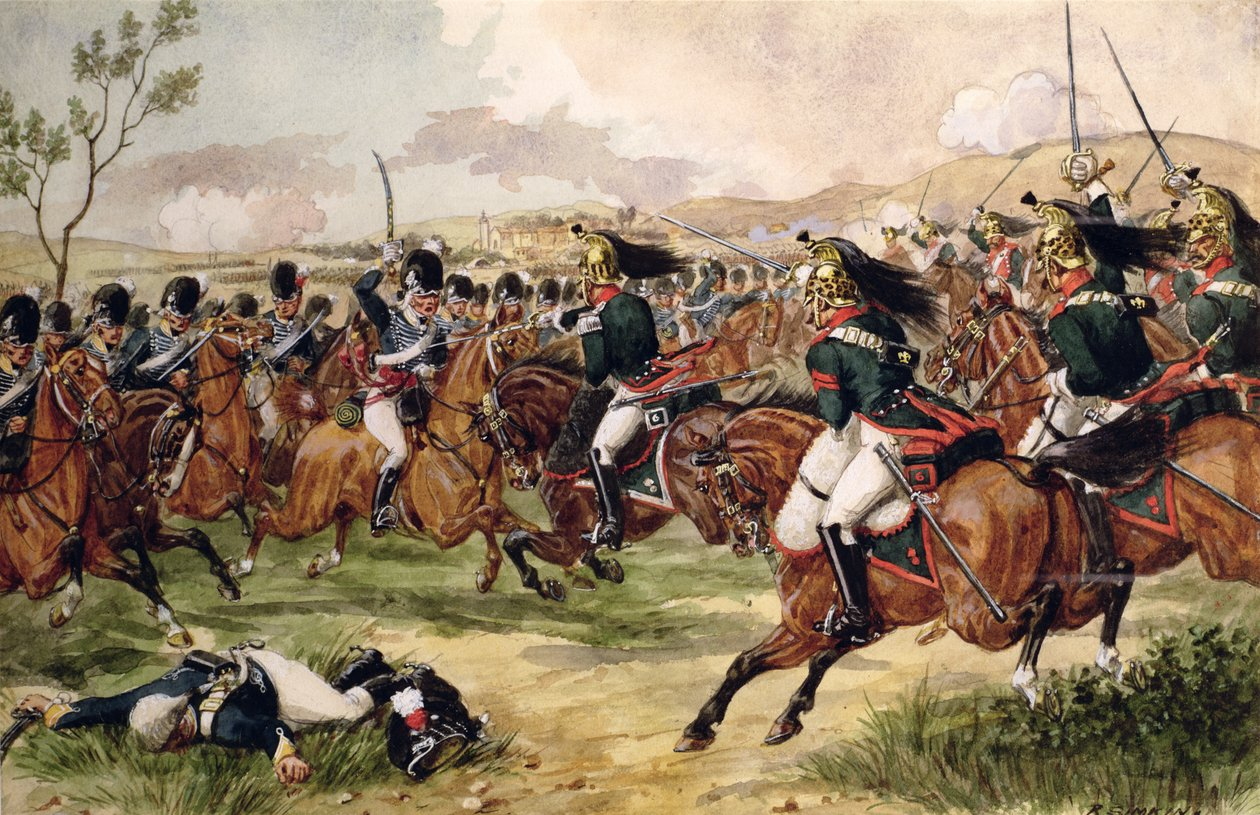
The Battle of Vimeiro, at which Sir Arthur Wellesley described the regiment's conduct as "an example to the Army"

In August 1808, the 1st Battalion landed in Portugal, and was quickly engaged in action against the French at the Battle of Roliça on 17 August, the Battle of Vimeiro on 21 August. Following these early victories, the 36th served in Sir John Moore's army operating in Spain and but by the end of 1808 his army was in full retreat and, after taking part in the Retreat to Corunna, the battalion fought with the rearguard at the Battle of Corunna on 16 January 1809. The battle held back the French under Soult and allowed the successful embarkation of the British force, though Moore was killed during the action. The 1st/36th embarked for England on the following day.

The 1st Battalion took part in the Walcheren Campaign, an unsuccessful attempt to open another front in the war in Flanders. They landed on 1 August 1809 and were initially successful in capturing Flushing. However an epidemic of malaria soon swept through the troops stationed on the swampy islands, and the battalion lost more than 200 to the disease. They returned to England in December 1809.

The 1st/36th were stationed at Battle, Sussex where they were brought up to strength before sailing from Portsmouth, arriving in Lisbon on 5 March 1811. They formed part of an army of reinforcements as the British began a new offensive aimed at breaking the military stalemate in the Iberian peninsula. The battalion fought at the Battle of Salamanca on 22 July 1812 and took part in the Siege of Burgos from September to October 1812. They then pursued the French Army into France fighting at the Battle of the Pyrenees in July and August 1813, the Battle of Nivelle on 10 November 1813 and the Battle of the Nive in December 1813 as well as the Battle of Orthez in February 1814 and the Battle of Toulouse in April 1814.

The 1st Battalion arrived back in Ireland in July 1814. On 24 October 1814 the 2nd Battalion was disbanded, with men fit for duty transferred to the 1st Battalion which became once more simply the 36th (Herefordshire) Regiment of Foot.

=== 1815–1881 ===
For the last sixty-five years of its existence as a separate regiment, the 36th Foot was not involved in active conflict, for the most part performing garrison duties in the United Kingdom and the British Empire. It formed part of the army occupying France from July to December 1815 and then moved to Portsmouth on 22 December 1815. The regiment was sent to Malta in September 1817 and then on to the United States of the Ionian Islands in 1821, where they suffered from much sickness, before returning to England in 1826. The regiment was posted to Ireland in 1827 and then embarked for Barbados in 1831 although eleven men were killed in a hurricane on the way.

The regiment was at Barbados until 1833 when it moved to Antigua; it transferred St Lucia in 1835 and back to Barbados in 1837. It then moved on to North America arriving in Nova Scotia in 1838 and New Brunswick in 1839 before returning to Ireland in 1842. The regiment moved to Northern England in 1845; a second or reserve battalion was formed at Weedon Bec on 28 November 1846. It was posted back to the United States of the Ionian Islands in 1847: both battalions were stationed there during an insurgency. The reserve battalion was absorbed by the 1st Battalion in April 1850.

In 1851 the regiment returned to Barbados before moving on to Trinidad in 1852. In 1853 it returned to Barbados and then, in 1854, it moved to Jamaica where the regiment lost a large number of men from an epidemic of yellow fever. It returned home to England in 1857 and then spent a tour in Ireland from 1860 to 1863 when it was posted to India. It returned to England in 1875 before being posted to Ireland again in 1880.

=== Amalgamation ===
Under the Cardwell Reforms, a "localisation scheme" for infantry regiments was introduced. This divided the United Kingdom into "brigade districts". Within each district a single depot was to be established to accommodate two regular battalions and also the local militia regiments. In April 1873 it was announced that the 22nd Brigade District was to consist of the counties of Herefordshire and Worcestershire, with a single depot for the 29th (Worcestershire) Regiment of Foot, the 36th Foot and the Herefordshire and Worcestershire Militia. The 29th and 36th Foot were to be paired, with one regiment on active service while the other was on home duties, with the two swapping roles every few years. A depot was established at Norton Barracks, near Worcester.

On 1 July 1881 the Childers Reforms came into effect and the 29th and 36th Regiments of Foot became the 1st and 2nd Battalions of the Worcestershire Regiment, with the militia regiments becoming the 3rd and 4th Battalions. The amalgamated regiment inherited the traditions and battle honours of the 29th and 36th Foot.

In 1970 the Worcestershire Regiment was itself amalgamated with the Sherwood Foresters (Nottinghamshire and Derbyshire Regiment) to form the Worcestershire and Sherwood Foresters Regiment. In another amalgamation in 2007, the Worcestershire and Sherwood Foresters Regiment became part of a new large regiment, the Mercian Regiment.

== Facings, battle honours and motto ==
The facings worn on the red coats of the regiment were green by 1742, when they were illustrated in A Representation of the Clothing of His Majesty's Household and all the Forces upon the Establishments of Great Britain and Ireland, commissioned by the Duke of Cumberland. Nine years later a royal warrant was issued on 1 July 1751 regulating the "Colours, Cloathing &c. of the Marching Regiments of Foot" where the facings were confirmed as green. The 1751 warrant and subsequent regulations also set out the design of the colours of the regiment: the first or King's (or Queen's) colour being the grand union with the regimental number in the centre in Roman numerals and the second or regimental colour being of the facing colour with the regimental number and title in the centre.

Battle honours came to be borne on scrolls on the regimental colour, and by 1881 the 36th Foot had received the following:

- Hindoostan
- Rolica
- Vimiera
- Corunna
- Salamanca
- Pyrenees
- Nivelle
- Nive
- Orthes
- Toulouse
- Peninsula

Following amalgamation the Worcestershire Regiment was belatedly awarded two battle honours for the service of the 36th Foot:

- Mysore: awarded in 1889 for services in southern India in 1780–1784 and 1790–1792.
- Belle Isle: awarded in 1951 for the capture of Belle Île.

The regimental motto was the word "Firm". The origins of this are not certainly known, although regimental tradition stated that it had been granted in 1747 for their performance at the Battle of Lauffeld It was uncertain if the regiment was authorised to use the motto until new colours were ordered at the end of 1816. The regiment corresponded with George Nayler, the Inspector of Regimental Colours as to whether the motto could be emblazoned. On 6 January 1817 Nayler issued a letter stating he was satisfied that the motto had been in use at least since 1773 and it that it could be borne. The motto was subsequently used by the Worcestershire Regiment from 1881 to 1970 and the Worcestershire and Sherwood Foresters Regiment from 1970 to 2007. The motto of the Mercian Regiment since 2007 has been "Stand Firm and Strike Hard", and the word "Firm" forms part of the collar badge design.

== Regimental Colonels ==
Colonels of the Regiment were:

Viscount Charlemont's Regiment of Foot, etc.

- 1701–1706: Maj-Gen. William Caulfeild, 2nd Viscount Charlemont
- 1706–1709: Col. Thomas Alnutt
- 1709–1710: Col. Archibald Campbell, 3rd Duke of Argyll (Earl of Islay)
- 1710–1715: Col. Henry Disney
- 1715–1719: Col. Hon. William Egerton
- 1719–1720: Brig-Gen. Sir Charles Hotham, Bt
- 1720–1721: Brig-Gen. John Pocock
- 1721–1732: Col. Charles Lenoe
- 1732–1737: Maj-Gen. John Moyle
- 1737–1741: Lt-Gen. Humphrey Bland
- 1741–1751: Maj-Gen. James Fleming

36th Regiment of Foot (1751)

- 1751–1765: Gen. Lord Robert Manners
- 1765–1778: Lt-Gen. Sir Richard Pierson, KB
- 1778–1818: Gen. Hon. Henry St John

36th (the Herefordshire) Regiment of Foot (1782)

- 1818–1829: Gen. Sir George Don, GCB, GCH
- 1829–1851: Gen. Sir Roger Hale Sheaffe, Bt.
- 1851–1854: Lt-Gen. Lord Frederick FitzClarence
- 1854–1868: Gen. William Henry Scott
- 1868–1868: Maj-Gen. Edward Basil Brooke
- 1868–1876: Gen. Sir Arthur Augustus Thurlow Cunynghame, GCB
- 1876–1881: Gen. Sir Charles William Dunbar Staveley, GCB

== Sources ==
- Cannon, Richard (1853). Historical Record of the Thirty-Sixth, or the Herefordshire Regiment of Foot. London: Parker, Furnivall and Parker. OCLC 1083989414.
