= Duke of Cumberland's Regiment of Light Dragoons =

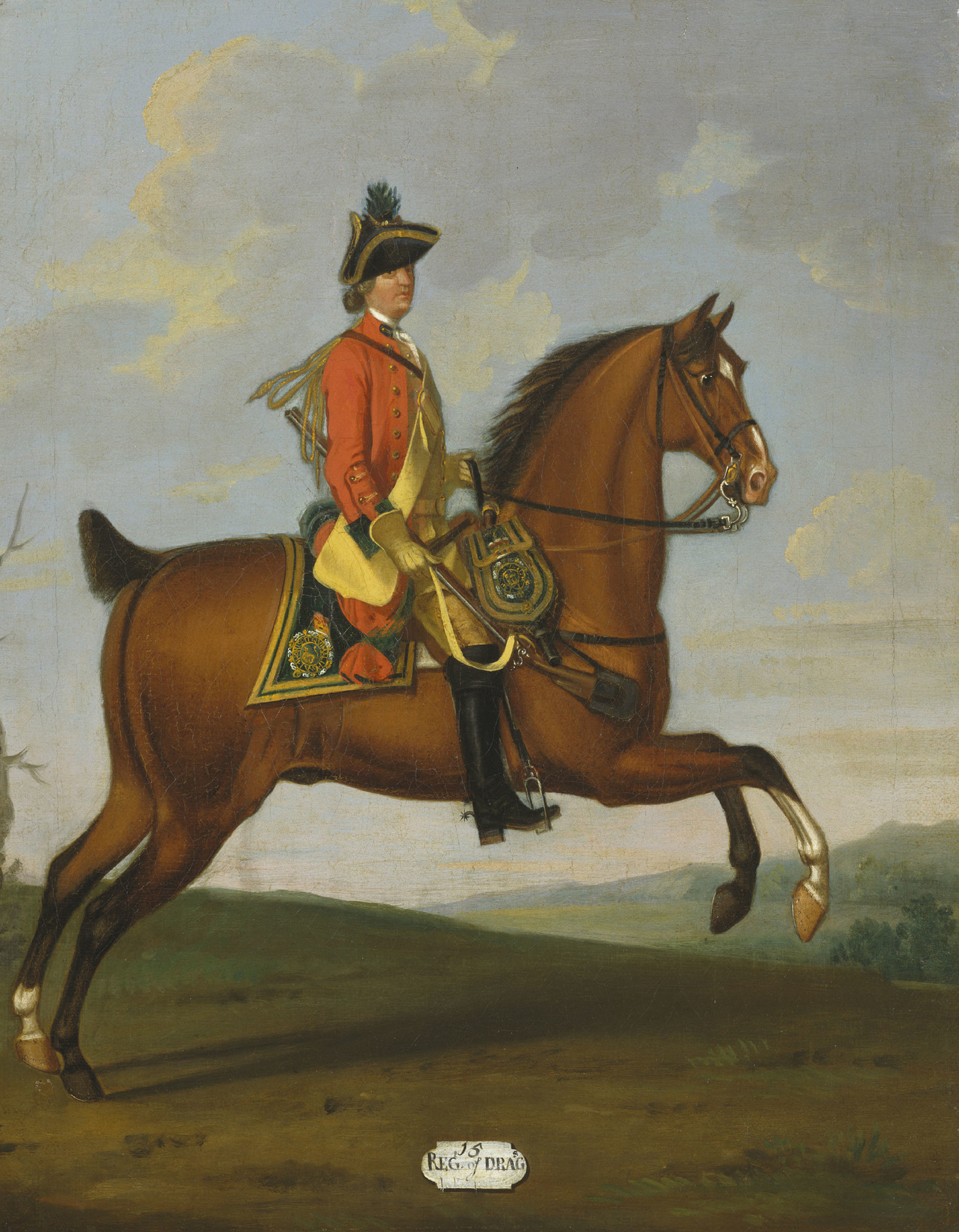
1746 painting of a regimental private

The Duke of Cumberland's Regiment of Light Dragoons was a light cavalry regiment of the British Army raised in 1746 and disbanded in 1749. It was raised by the Duke of Cumberland in 1746, drawing most of its men from the recently disbanded Duke of Kingston's Regiment of Light Horse, and was ranked as the 15th Light Dragoons - the first regiment of the British Army to be classed as light dragoons. The regiment served in the Austrian Netherlands during the War of the Austrian Succession, and distinguished itself at the Battle of Lauffeld. Following the Treaty of Aix-la-Chapelle the regiment was withdrawn to the United Kingdom; in September 1748 Lord Robert Manners succeeded the Duke as colonel, and the regiment was disbanded in 1749.
