= Sir Charles Hotham, 4th Baronet =

British Army officer and Whig politician

Brigadier-General Sir Charles Hotham Bt
- Born: c. 1663; Bermuda
- Died: 8 January 1723

Sir Charles Hotham, 4th Baronet (c. 1663 – 8 January 1723), of Scorborough and later of Beverley and South Dalton, was a British Army officer and Whig politician who sat in the English House of Commons and British House of Commons from 1695 to 1723.

== Biography ==
Hotham was born in Bermuda, the only son of Charles Hotham (1615 – c. 1672), and Elizabeth (died 1685), daughter of Stephen Thompson of Humbleton, Yorkshire. His father was a prominent Nonconformist who lost his living as rector of Wigan after the Restoration and emigrated with his wife to Bermuda to take up a ministry. Minister Hotham lived there for the rest of his life. Shortly before his father's death, Hotham was sent to London where he lived under the care of his cousin Richard Thompson.

Hotham was educated at Sedbergh School before entering St John's College, Cambridge in 1681, where he was awarded BA in 1685, MA in 1688 and elected a fellow from 1685 to 1692. He was also ordained as a deacon. He succeeded his cousin Sir John Hotham, 3rd Baronet in the baronetcy on 25 August 1691, on condition that he married Sir John's niece, Bridget, daughter of William Gee. Sir Charles and Bridget lived at Scorborough House, the Hotham family seat near Beverley, Yorkshire, which later burned down in 1705.

Hotham inherited a considerable debt along with the baronetcy which was not paid off until 1697. In 1705 his house was destroyed in a fire and the family moved to South Dalton. He became a Regimental Colonel in 1705 of a regiment he raised in Yorkshire, with which he went to Spain in 1706 as part of the British expeditionary force initially commanded by Earl Rivers. Suffering losses from the defence of several towns, the regiment was disbanded in 1708.

Promoted to Brigadier-General in 1710, Hotham was put on half-pay in 1713. In 1715 he was made colonel of a regiment which would later be the 44th Foot. He was Colonel of The Prince of Wales's Own Regiment of Dragoons from 1717 until they were disbanded in 1718. He was then appointed Colonel of the 36th Foot in 1719, from which he transferred as Colonel to the 8th Foot in 1720. He lastly transferred to the Royal Dragoons in 1721, serving until his death.

Hotham was the Member of Parliament for Scarborough from 1695 to 1701 and for Beverley from 1702 until his death in 1723.

Between 1716 and 1721 he built a neo-Palladian house known as Hotham House in Eastgate, Beverley, designed by the pioneering Scottish architect Colen Campbell. It remained empty after his death and was demolished c.1766.

Hotham was buried at South Dalton.

== Family ==
Hotham had married twice: firstly Bridget, daughter of William Gee, with whom he had 3 sons and 7 daughters and secondly Lady Mildred, the daughter of James Cecil, 3rd Earl of Salisbury, and the widow of Sir Uvedale Corbet, 3rd Baronet, of Longnor, Shropshire; they had one son who died before his father. Hotham was succeeded by Charles a son from his first marriage.

== Notes ==
Parliament of England
Preceded by John Hungerford; The Viscount of Irvine	Member of Parliament for Scarborough; 1695–1702; With: The Viscount of Irvine; William Thompson 1701-1702	Succeeded by John Hungerford; William Thompson
Preceded by Sir Michael Warton; William Gee	Member of Parliament for Beverley; 1702–1708; With: William Gee 1702-1705; John Moyser 1705-1708	Succeeded by Parliament of Great Britain
Parliament of Great Britain
Preceded by Parliament of England	Member of Parliament for Beverley; 1708–1723; With: Sir Michael Warton 1708-1722; Michael Newton 1722-1723	Succeeded by Michael Newton; Sir Charles Hotham, Bt
Military offices
Preceded by Henry Morrison	Colonel of 8th (The King's) Regiment; 1720–1721	Succeeded by John Pocock
Preceded by William Egerton	Colonel of Hotham's Regiment of Foot; 1719–1720	Succeeded by John Pocock
Baronetage of England
Preceded by John Hotham	Baronet (of Scorborough); 1691-1723	Succeeded by Charles Hotham
