= Sir John Hotham, 3rd Baronet =

English politician

Sir John Hotham, 3rd Baronet (2 August 1655 – 25 August 1691) was an English politician who sat in the House of Commons from 1689 to 1690.

Hotham was the son of Sir John Hotham, 2nd Baronet and his wife Elizabeth, daughter of Sapcote Beaumont, 2nd Viscount Beaumont of Swords. He inherited the baronetcy on the death of his father in 1689.

In 1689, Hotham was elected Member of Parliament for Beverley in succession to his father.

Hotham died at the age of 36 and the baronetcy passed to a cousin Charles.

Baronetage of England
Preceded by John Hotham	Baronet (of Scorborough); 1689–1691	Succeeded by Charles Hotham
