= Sir John Hotham, 1st Baronet =

English politician (1589–1645)

Sir John Hotham Bt
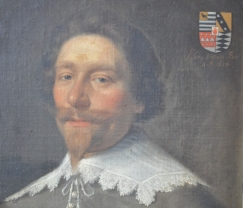
- Portrait by Cornelius Janssens

Member of the England Parliament for Beverley
- In office 1625–1629 Serving with William Alford
- Preceded by: Sir Henry Carey; Edmund Scott
- Succeeded by: Parliament suspended
- In office 1640–1643
- Preceded by: Parliament suspended
- Succeeded by: Micheal Warton

Personal details
- Born: c. July 1589
- Died: 3 January 1645
- Resting place: All Hallows-by-the-Tower

Sir John Hotham, 1st Baronet (c. July 1589 – 3 January 1645) was an English politician who served as the governor of Hull shortly before the start of the English Civil War. He refused to allow King Charles I or any member of his entourage to enter the town, thereby depriving the king of access to the large arsenal contained within. Later in the Civil War he and his son John Hotham the younger were accused of treachery to the Parliamentarian cause, found guilty and executed on Tower Hill.

== Early life ==
Arms of Hotham: Barry of ten argent and azure, on a canton or a Cornish chough proper

He was born in 1589 the second but only surviving son of John Hotham (1540–1609) of Scorborough, who in 1584 had been elected a Member of Parliament for Scarborough in Yorkshire. His mother has been variously given as Julian Stanhope, a daughter of Sir Michael Stanhope of Shelford, Nottinghamshire or as Jane Legard, a daughter of Richard Legard of Rysome, Yorkshire.

== Career ==
1802 engraving of Hotham as governor of Hull

He fought on the continent of Europe during the early part of the Thirty Years' War. In 1622 he was made a baronet. He was elected a Member of Parliament for Beverley in the five Parliaments between 1625 and 1640, and served as Sheriff of Yorkshire in 1634. In 1639 he was deprived by the king of his office of governor of Hull and joining the parliamentary party, he refused to pay ship-money. In January 1642 Hotham was ordered by Parliament to seize the town of Hull, where there was a large store of munitions of war; this was at once carried out by his son John Hotham the younger. Hotham senior took command of Hull and in April 1642 refused to admit King Charles I to the town. Later he promised his prisoner, George Digby, 2nd Earl of Bristol, that he would surrender the town to the king, but when Charles appeared again he refused a second time and drove away the besiegers.

Meanwhile, Hotham the younger was taking an active part in the Civil War in Yorkshire and Lincolnshire, but was soon at variance with other parliamentary leaders, especially with Lord Fairfax and his son Sir Thomas Fairfax, and complaints about his conduct and that of his troops were made by Oliver Cromwell and by Colonel John Hutchinson. Soon both the Hothams were corresponding with the Earl of Newcastle, and Hotham the younger was probably ready to betray Hull; these proceedings became known to Parliament, and in June 1643 father and son were captured and taken to London.

== Death and burial ==
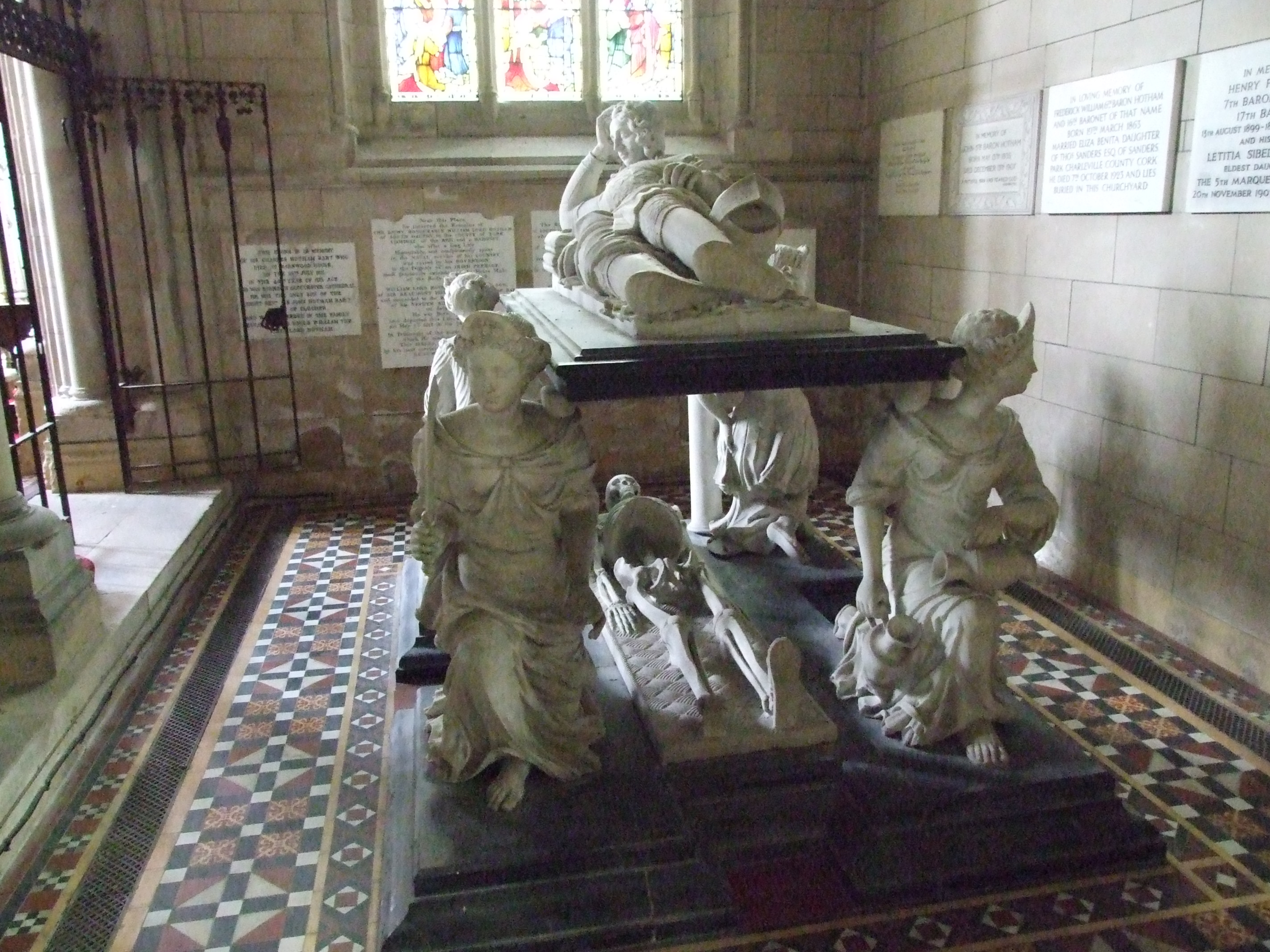
Monument to Hotham in St Mary's Church, South Dalton, supported by figures of the cardinal virtues

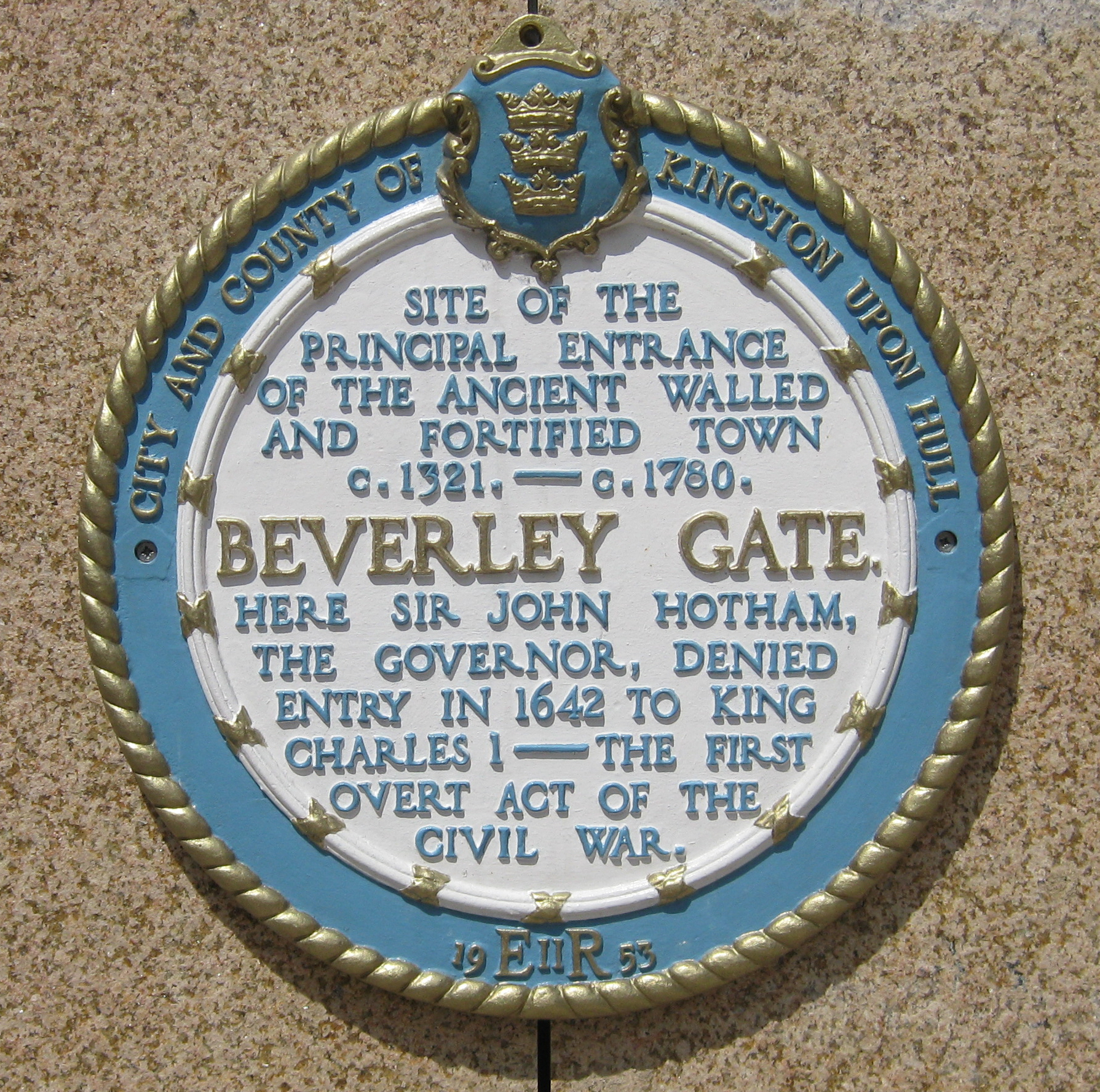
Commemorative plaque, Beverley Gate, Hull

After a long delay, they were tried by court-martial, found guilty, and sentenced to death. The younger Hotham was beheaded at Tower Hill on 2 January 1645, and despite efforts made by the House of Lords and the Presbyterians to save him, his father suffered the same fate on the following day. Both were buried at the nearby church of All Hallows-by-the-Tower. A tomb monument was erected in his memory in St Mary's Church, South Dalton. The baronetcy passed to Sir John's grandson Sir John Hotham, 2nd Baronet, the son of Hotham the younger.

=== Marriages and children ===
Sir John married five times and had sixteen children of whom six sons and three daughters survived childhood.

- Firstly, on 16 February 1607, to Katherine Rodes, daughter of Sir John Rodes of Barlborough, Derbyshire. By Katherine, who brought a dowry of 1,000 marks, he had two sons and two daughters, who all predeceased their father, including:
  - John Hotham the younger, eldest son and heir apparent, who with his father was accused of treachery, found guilty and executed.
- Secondly, on 16 July 1614 to Anne Rokeby—daughter and heiress of Ralph Rokeby (died 1595), Deputy Secretary of the Council in the North 1587–95—by whom he had three sons, including:
  - Rev. Charles Hotham (1615– c. 1672), Rector of Wigan, a Cambridge scholar and author of Ad Philosophiam Teutonicam Manuductio (1648). He supported Parliament during the Civil War, and was ejected as a minister shortly after the Restoration of the Monarchy.
  - Durant Hotham (1617–1691), a lawyer, landowner, and East Riding magistrate, author of a Life of Jakob Boehme (1654).
- Thirdly he married Frances Legard, daughter of John Legard, of London and of Ganton, North Yorkshire, a member of the Haberdashers' Company, by whom he had three daughters, who all predeceased their father.
- Fourthly, on 27 October 1631, he married Katherine Bamburgh (d. 31 August 1634), a daughter of Sir William Bamburgh, 1st Baronet of Howsham, Yorkshire, and widow of Sir Thomas Norcliffe of Langton, Yorkshire. By Katherine Bamburgh he had two daughters, one of whom predeceased their father.
- Fifthly, on 7 May 1635, he married Sarah Anlaby, a daughter of Thomas Anlaby of Etton, Yorkshire, by whom he had four daughters.

== Theatrical Representations ==
In 2017, a play called The Hypocrite, written by Richard Bean was performed by the Royal Shakespeare Company at Hull Truck Theatre and Stratford. Sir John Hotham was played by Mark Addy and Lady Sarah Hotham played by Caroline Quentin.

== Notes ==
Parliament of England
Preceded by Sir Henry Carey; Edmund Scott	Member of Parliament for Beverley; 1625–1629; With: William Alford	Parliament suspended until 1640
Vacant Parliament suspended since 1629	Member of Parliament for Beverley; 1640–1643; With: Michael Warton	Succeeded by Michael Warton
Baronetage of England
New creation	Baronet (of Scorborough); 1622–1645	Succeeded by John Hotham
