= John Hotham, the younger =

English politician

Sir John Hotham the younger (1610, Yorkshire – 2 January 1645, London), known as Captain Hotham, was an English member of parliament and military commander who fought for the Parliamentarians during the First English Civil War. He was executed for treason in 1645.

== Early years ==
Born around 1610, Hotham was the son of Sir John Hotham and his first wife, Katherine Rodes. As a young man, Hotham served in the army of the Prince of Orange during the Thirty Years War in the Netherlands from 1629 to 1631; he may have been present at the 1629 English siege of Bois-le-Duc. In 1640, Hotham became a member of parliament for Scarborough, North Yorkshire during the Long Parliament and the Short Parliament.

== First English Civil War ==
In September 1642, warfare broke out between the Royalist forces loyal to King Charles I and Roundhead supporters of the English parliament. In January 1642, Parliament had reappointed Hotham's father as the governor of Hull. Hotham went there with a detachment of troops to occupy it. Home to many Royalist supporters, Hull contained a significant Royalist arms cache. The mayor of Hull initially refused entry to Hotham, but a week later the Hothams controlled the city. On 23 April 1642, King Charles demanded entry to Hull, but Hotham's father refused.

In September 1642, Hotham moved from Hull with a detachment of troops to occupy Doncaster. In October 1642, he captured Cawood Castle in North Yorkshire. This move was in defiance of a neutrality agreement that Ferdinando Fairfax, 2nd Lord Fairfax of Cameron, the leader of the Parliamentarian forces in Yorkshire, had negotiated with the Royalist forces in Newcastle. In 1643, Hotham and Fairfax occupied Leeds and laid siege to York. However, Royalist forces broke the siege and forced Fairfax's forces to retreat to Hull. Hotham participated in skirmishes at Tadcaster on 7 December and at Sherburn during this fallback.

By early 1643, Hotham was ready to switch to the Royalist side. He considered himself a better commander than Fairfax and resented being under his command. In February or March 1643, Hotham started negotiating with the Earl of Newcastle, the Royalist commander in Yorkshire at Bridlington, supposedly about a prisoner exchange. In exchange for surrendering Hull and changing sides, Hotham demanded 20,000 pounds cash, the rank of viscount for his father and the rank of baron for himself.

In April 1643, Hotham joined his troops with the Parliamentarian forces in Lincolnshire. The bad behaviour of Hotham's troops, coupled with what appeared to be attempts by Hotham to co-opt the Parliamentarian officers, raised suspicions with then Colonel Oliver Cromwell and John Hutchinson, the governor of Nottingham Castle. They denounced him to the Parliamentary Committee of Safety,

== Trial and execution ==
In the summer of 1643, the Committee ordered Hotham's arrest. He fled Nottingham, but was arrested with his father while trying to get back to Hull. In December 1644, both men were tried on treason charges in London. Hotham tried to shift all the blame to his father, but was convicted anyway. On 1 January 1645, John Hotham the younger was executed by beheading. His father was executed the next day.
