= Ligonier (surname) =

Ligonier is a surname. Notable people with the surname include:

- Edward Ligonier, 1st Earl Ligonier (1740–1782), British soldier and courtier
- Francis Ligonier (1693–1746), French-born British Army officer
- John Ligonier, 1st Earl Ligonier (1680–1770), British military officer
- Penelope Ligonier (1749–1827), English aristocrat and socialite
