= Ligonier =

Ligonier may refer to:

== People ==
- Ligonier (surname)
- Earl Ligonier, a title in the Peerage of Great Britain

== Places in the United States ==
- Ligonier, Indiana
- Ligonier, Pennsylvania
- Ligonier Township, Pennsylvania
- Fort Ligonier, a British fortification from the French and Indian War in Ligonier, Pennsylvania

== Other ==
- Ligonier Ministries, an international Christian discipleship organization founded by R. C. Sproul
