= Cobham Park (disambiguation) =

Cobham Park may refer to:

- Cobham Park, a country house in Surrey, England, now converted to apartments
- Cobham Park (cricket ground), in Kent, England
- Cobham Park (Virginia), a historic estate in Virginia, United States
