= Battle of Falkirk Muir =

Battle on 17 January 1746 during the Jacobite rising of 1745

Coordinates: 55°59′13″N 3°48′50″W

- Part of Jacobite rising of 1745
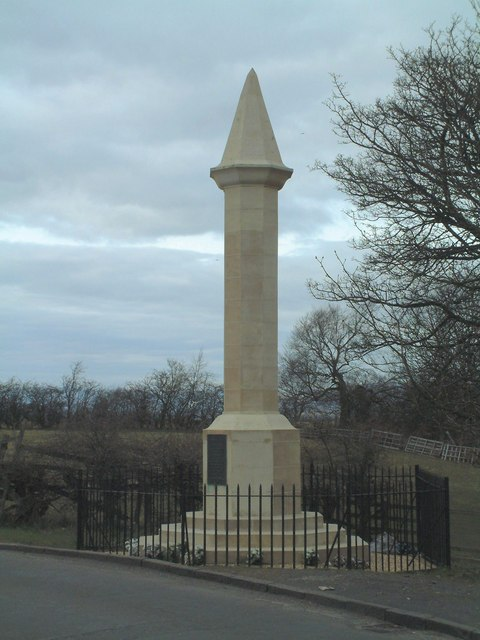
- Monument erected to commemorate the battle
Date	17 January 1746
Location	Falkirk, Scotland, Great Britain
Result	Jacobite victory

Belligerents
Jacobites	Great Britain

Commanders and leaders
Charles Stuart; John O' Sullivan; George Murray; John Drummond	Henry Hawley; John Huske; Francis Ligonier; James Cholmondeley

Strength
8,000	7,000

Casualties and losses
130 killed and wounded	370 killed and wounded

Registered battlefield
- Official name: Battle of Falkirk II
- Designated: 21 March 2011
- Reference no.: BTL9

The Battle of Falkirk Muir, or Battle of Falkirk, (Note: Scottish Gaelic: Blàr na h-Eaglaise Brice; Scots: Battle o Fawkirk Muir) took place near Falkirk, Scotland, on 17 January 1746 during the Jacobite rising of 1745. A narrow Jacobite victory, it had little impact on the campaign.

After their withdrawal from England in December 1745, the Jacobite army besieged Stirling Castle in early January. Lacking siege equipment, they made little progress and government forces under Henry Hawley advanced north from Edinburgh to relieve it. He reached Falkirk on 15 January but was taken by surprise when the Jacobites attacked late in the afternoon of 17 January.

Fought in failing light and heavy snow, Hawley's left wing was routed but his right held firm, and both sides believed themselves to have been defeated. As a result, the Jacobites failed to follow up their victory, allowing the government troops to regroup in Edinburgh. Hawley was replaced by Duke of Cumberland, who resumed the advance on 30 January, forcing the Jacobite army to withdraw to Inverness. The rebellion later ended at the Battle of Culloden in April.

The battlefield has been inventoried and protected by Historic Scotland under the Historic Environment (Amendment) Act 2011.

== Background ==
Although the invasion of England had few tangible benefits, reaching Derby and returning to Scotland were considerable military achievements. That brought in new recruits, and in late November, John Drummond arrived from France with weapons, money and 150 Irish and Scots regulars. In early January, Jacobite morale and numbers were at their peak, with 8,000 to 9,000 effectives. Success at Inverurie on 23 December gave the Jacobites temporary control of north-eastern Scotland, which they now attempted to extend to the Central Lowlands. Their objective was Stirling Castle, one of the strongest fortifications in Scotland and a position of major strategic importance that controlled access between the Highlands and the Lowlands.

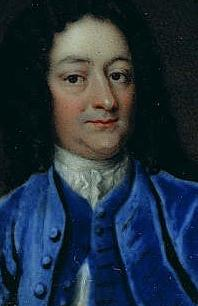
Henry Hawley, government commander at Falkirk

Split into two columns, the main army left Glasgow on 4 January for Stirling, where they would rendezvous with Drummond's troops. Lord George Murray and the first column marched on Falkirk and turned north towards Stirling, leaving a cavalry detachment under Lord Elcho at Linlithgow to patrol the Edinburgh road.

The second passed through Kilsyth, en route to Bannockburn, where Charles Edward Stuart established his headquarters at Bannockburn House, owned by the Jacobite Sir Hugh Paterson. Although the town of Stirling quickly surrendered, the castle was a far greater challenge, with strong defences and a garrison of 600 to 700 troops, under William Blakeney, an experienced and determined Irish veteran. Siege operations began on 8 January, but for a number of reasons, progress was slow.

On 13 January, Henry Hawley, government commander in Scotland, ordered his deputy Major General John Huske, and 4,000 men to advance on Stirling while he followed with another 3,000. They reached Falkirk on 15 January and made camp just outside the town. Murray withdrew to Plean Muir, south-east of Bannockburn, where he was joined by Charles and John O' Sullivan, with all the troops that could be spared from the siege.

== Battle ==
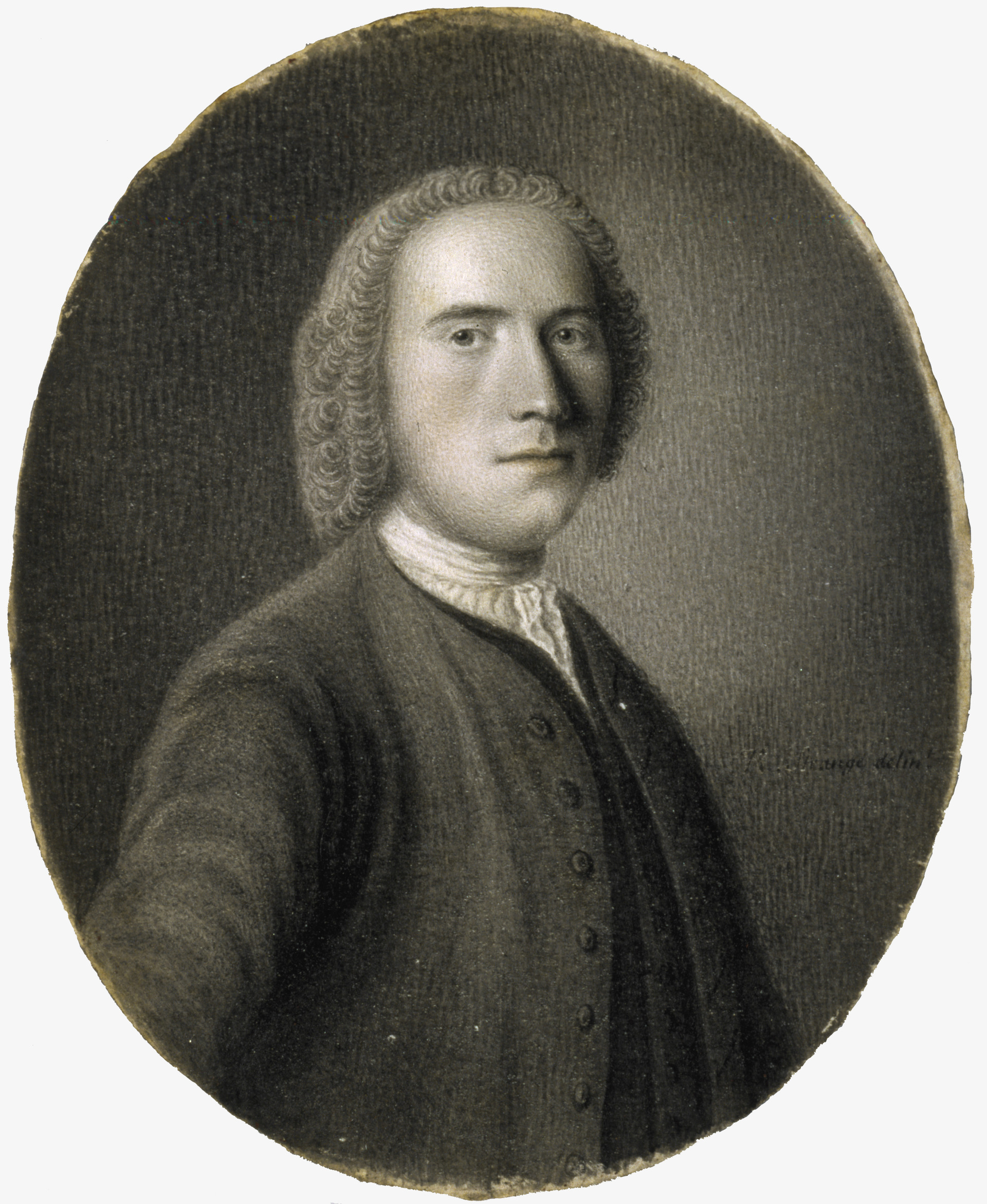
Lord George Murray, Jacobite commander at Falkirk

Poor leadership on both sides had a significant impact on the battle; having commanded dragoons at Sheriffmuir in 1715, Hawley overestimated the vulnerability of Highlanders to cavalry while seriously underestimating their fighting qualities and numbers. Ongoing recriminations over the withdrawal from Derby meant the Jacobite senior command was divided between the Scots and Charles and his exile advisors, several of whom openly claimed Murray was a traitor.

When Hawley failed to attack on 16 January, Murray, Charles and O'Sullivan agreed to take the offensive on the morning of the 17th. Some of Drummond's regulars marched towards Stirling to distract the government scouts, and Murray's Highlanders took up position on the high ground to the south, above the camp. They were helped by Hawley's assumption that they would not dare attack him and his location a mile away at Callendar House. According to an aide, they "beat to Arms" at 12:00 and then stood down, and it was not until 14:30 Hawley realised the seriousness of the situation. The weather suddenly changed, and it began raining and snowing heavily, with a strong wind blowing directly into the faces of Hawley's troops.

The government army moved south on Maggie Wood's Loan, past the Bantaskin House, and up the slope of the Falkirk ridge. Despite their earlier failure at Prestonpans, the dragoons led the way, an order that their commander, Francis Ligonier, allegedly viewed as "the most extraordinary ever given". Their horses churned the track into a morass, slowing the infantry, and the guns in the rear became stuck and could not be freed in time to take part in the battle. The rain also affected the infantry's black powder cartridges. It was later estimated that one out of every four muskets misfired.

The dragoons halted on the far side of the rise, with a bog to their left while the infantry deployed to their right (see map). The front line consisted of the dragoons and then six battalions of veteran infantry; (Note: Left to right; (1) Dragoons; Ligonier, Cobham and Hamilton; (2) infantry regiments;Wolfe, Cholmondeley), Pulteney, The Royals, Price and Ligoniers) a second line with five more infantry battalions, (Note: Blakeney's, Munro's, Fleming's, Barrel's and Battereau's (fr)) then Howard's regiment and 1,000 men of the Argyll Militia behind. The inexperienced Glasgow militia were not considered frontline troops and deployed several hundred yards behind the dragoons on the left. Opposing them was a first line composed of the Highland regiments, (Note: Right to left; MacDonalds (Keppoch's, Glengarry's and Clanranald's regiments) Cameron of Lochiel's, Lord Lovat's, MacPherson of Cluny's, Lady Mackintosh's, Cromartie's, Farquharson of Monaltrie's battalion, and the Appin Regiment) Lowland units behind, (Note: Lord Lewis Gordon's regiment, Lord Ogilvy's regiment and the Atholl Brigade) then a small number of cavalry and 150 regulars from the French Irish Brigade in the rear. Murray dismounted and marched with the MacDonalds on the extreme right, opposite the dragoons. Crucially, he ensured that they remained in line and ordered his front rank not to fire until he had given the word.

Schematic map of the battle between South Bantaskine House

Murray later declared the position that had been selected meant that "the Highland army had all the advantages nature or art could give them". However, it was undermined by poor co-ordination, and Drummond, who was appointed to command the Jacobite left, was absent when the battle began. He arrived soon afterward, but that meant it lacked a senior commander at the start of action. Murray urged Charles to name an alternative, but he failed to do so.

Just after 16:00, Ligonier and his three regiments of dragoons attacked the MacDonalds, who waited until they came within pistol range and fired a single volley. As at Prestonpans, the dragoons fled in disorder. Restricted by the bog to their left, Cobham's regiment went north, and the other two rode over the infantry forming to their rear. In a few minutes, the entire left wing was swept away. All that remained for the Jacobites to achieve an overwhelming victory was to envelop Hawley's right. However, the MacDonalds and the entire front line charged down the hill and began sacking the government camp, and the sloping terrain and the lack of visibility left Murray unable to ascertain who was where. Three battalions, under Huske and Cholmondeley, held their positions, which were shielded by the ravine to their front, and repulsed attacks by the Jacobite left. The attackers fled in their turn, and, according to O'Sullivan, many did not stop until they had reached Stirling, *where they gave out we lost the day".

The darkness, continuing storm and general confusion on both sides ended the battle. Hawley initially withdrew to Falkirk, but most of his army was spread out on the road to Linlithgow, eventually returned to Edinburgh and re-formed. Captain Archibald Cunningham, the commander of the government artillery, abandoned his guns and used the transport horses to escape. When Huske's men retreated, they dragged some of the guns with them, but most were left behind, and Cunningham later committed suicide. Ligonier, who left his sickbed in Edinburgh to take command, died shortly afterward, and the severity of the weather is demonstrated by the fact that Cholmondeley suffered from severe exposure.

As in most battles of the period, many casualties occurred in the pursuit, a pattern repeated at Culloden in April but with the roles reversed. It is generally accepted that the Jacobites lost 50 dead and 80 wounded, mostly on their left, and the government forces lost around 70 dead, plus another 200 to 300 wounded or missing. The dead included 20 officers, including Sir Robert Munro and his younger brother, Duncan, who were killed in the pursuit and later buried in St Modan's, Falkirk. (Note: Sir Robert's death was described in a letter from his son Harry to Duncan Forbes as follows: 'My father, after being deserted, was attacked by six of Locheal's Reg & for some time defended himself.... Two of the six, I am informed, he kill'd... a seventh fired a Pistol into my father's Groin; upon falling, the Highlander with his sword gave him two strokes in the face, one over the Eyes & another on the mouth, which instantly ended a brave Man.)

== Aftermath ==
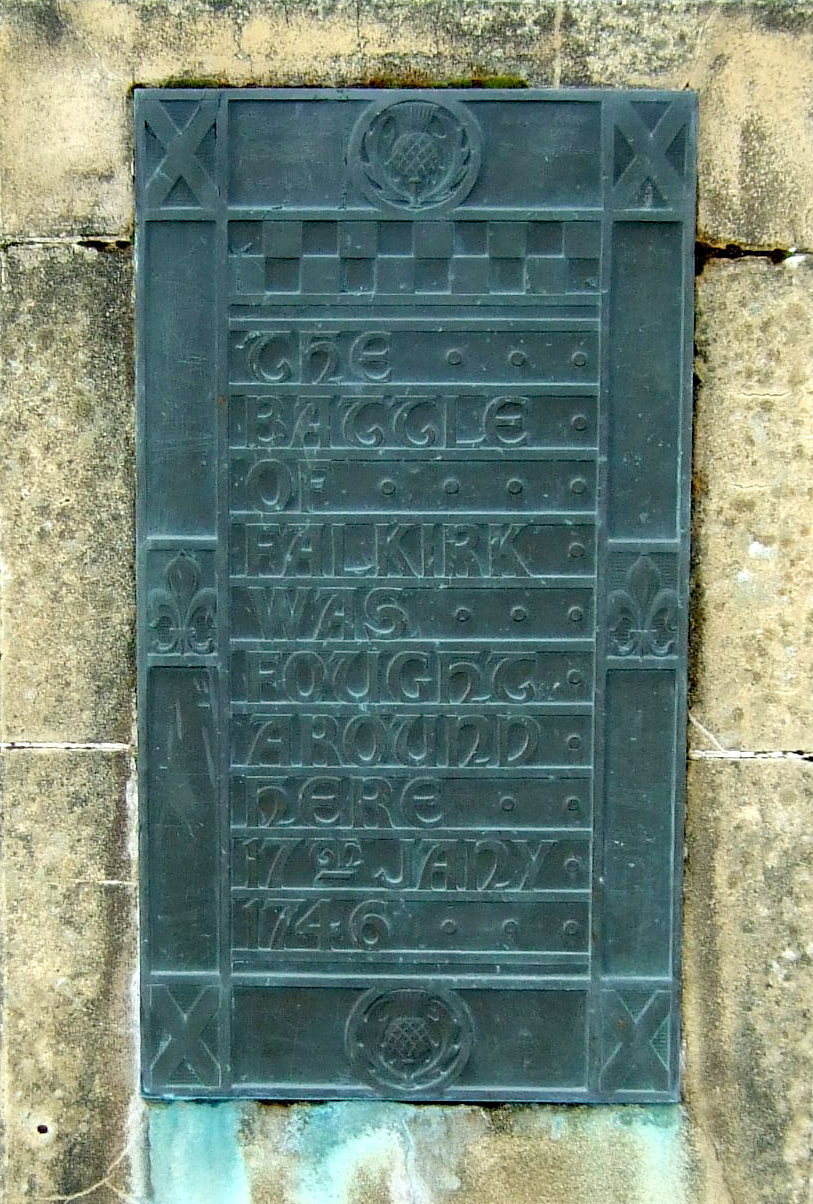
Plaque at the site of the battle

Despite the Jacobites' success, the battle has been described as a "hollow" victory since poor command and co-ordination deprived them of their last opportunity to decisively defeat their opponents. One factor was confusion over the result since from their position on the left, Charles and O'Sullivan initially thought they had been defeated. Murray publicly blamed Drummond for arriving late and not supporting his success on the right, but Drummond blamed Murray for the failure of the three MacDonald regiments to press home their attack. Murray also accused O'Sullivan of cowardice although Sheridan's official account credited him with rallying "part of the left wing". Amid those recriminations, Charles returned to Bannockburn, where he fell ill, which left Murray and the Highlanders at Falkirk.

On 29 January, Cumberland arrived in Edinburgh and assumed command. A number of soldiers were later executed for desertion. Hawley's poor leadership materially assisted the Jacobites, but unlike Sir John Cope, he never faced a court-martial. The writer Horace Walpole argued that Hawley had been "fifty times more culpable, since Cope miscarried by incapacity, Hawley by insolence and carelessness".

The exiles failed to appreciate that while the military obligations of clan society allowed the chiefs to provide large numbers of men at short notice, the obligation assumed warfare was short-term and rarely took place in the winter. After a successful battle like Prestonpans, many went home to secure their loot, and the clan chiefs could not prevent a similar flood of "desertions" after Falkirk. When Cumberland resumed his advance on 30 January, Charles asked Murray to prepare a battle plan but was told the army was in no state to fight. That destroyed the last remnants of trust between the two parties. On 1 February 1746, the siege of Stirling was abandoned, and the Jacobites withdrew to Inverness.

== Legacy ==
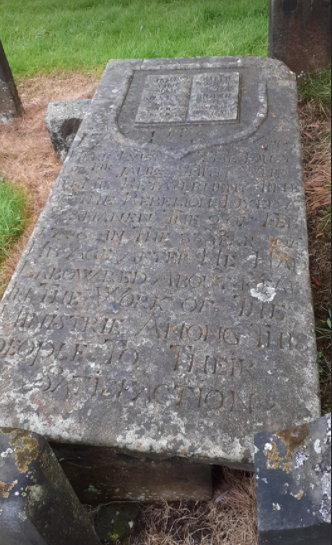
The grave of Rev James Smith (1713–1746), Who died of wounds following the Battle of Falkirk Muir, in Larbert churchyard.

Several songs were written commemorating the battle, including "The Highlandmen Came Down the Hill" and "The Battle of Falkirk Muir", a satirical attack on General Hawley that was intended to be sung to the tune of the song "Up and Waur Them A', Willie". Both songs are in the Scots language and bear little resemblance to the Gaelic musical tradition, which reveals their Lowland origins despite their commenting on Highland affairs. They first appeared in James Hogg's Jacobite Relics, and scholars such as Franklyn Bliss Snyder have noted that they were "surely retrospective, and possibly [Hogg's] own work".

The celebrated Gaelic poet Duncan Ban MacIntyre, who fought in the battle on the government side, wrote two poems about his experiences.

== Sources ==
- Bailey, Geoff B. (1996). Falkirk or paradise! : the Battle of Falkirk Muir, 17 January 1746. John Donald. ISBN 0859764311.
- British Battles. "Battle of Falkirk". britishbattles.com.
- Colburn, Henry (1880). A Genealogical and Heraldic Dictionary of the Peerage and Baronetage of the British Empire, Volume 42, Part1.
- Chambers, Robert (1827). History of the Rebellion of 1745–6 (2018 ed.). Forgotten Books.
- Duffy, Christopher (2003). The '45, Bonnie Prince Charlie and the Untold Story of the Jacobite Uprising (2018 ed.). Cassell. ISBN 9780753822623.
- Edwards, HN (1925). "The Battle of Falkirk 1746". Journal of the Society for Army Historical Research. 4 (17). JSTOR 44220106.
- Fremont-Barnes, Gregory (2011). The Jacobite Rebellion 1745–46 (Essential Histories). Osprey Publishing. ISBN 978-1846039928.
- Henshaw, Victoria (2014). Scotland and the British Army, 1700-1750: Defending the Union. Bloomsbury 3PL. ISBN 978-1472507303.
- Historic Environment Scotland. "Battle of Falkirk II (BTL9)".
- Mackay, Charles (1861). Jacobite Songs and Ballads of Scotland from 1688 to 1746. Richard Griffin and Company.
- Mackenzie, Alexander (1898). History of the Munros of Fowlis. A. & W. Mackenzie.
- O'Callaghan, John (1870). History of the Irish Brigades in the Service of France. Cameron & Ferguson.
- Reid, Stuart (2012). Cumberland's Culloden Army 1745-46. Osprey. ISBN 978-1849088466.
- Riding, Jacqueline (2016). Jacobites: A New History of the 45 Rebellion. Bloomsbury. ISBN 978-1408819128.
- Royle, Trevor (2016). Culloden; Scotland's Last Battle and the Forging of the British Empire. Little, Brown. ISBN 978-1408704011.
- Smurthwaite, David, Ordnance Survey Complete Guide to the Battlefields of Britain, Webb & Bower Ltd., 1984
- Snyder, Franklyn Bliss (1914). "Stuart and Jacobite Lyrics". The Journal of English and Germanic Philology. 13 (2): 259–280. JSTOR 27700581.
- Stair-Kerr, Eric (1928). Stirling Castle: Its Place in Scottish History (Classic Reprint) (2018 ed.). Forgotten Books. ISBN 978-1331341758.
- Tayler, Alistair; Tayler, Henrietta (1938). 1745 and After. T. Nelson and Sons, Ltd.
- Tomasson, Katherine; Buist, Francis (1978). Battles of the Forty-five. HarperCollins Distribution Services. ISBN 978-0713407693.
- Tucker-Jones, Anthony (2018). The Killing Game: A Thousand Years of Warfare in Twenty Battles. History Press. ISBN 978-0750983488.
- Watson, Thomas (1894). Kirkintilloch, town and parish. J. Smith.
