= William Baker (Kent cricketer) =

English cricketer (1832–1912)

William Baker (29 February 1832 – September 1912) was an English cricketer who played one match for Kent County Cricket Club in 1858. He was born at Cobham, Kent, the son of James and Sarah Baker. His younger brother, George, also played for Kent.

Baker played cricket for Cobham and made a single first-class cricket appearance in 1858 against an England team at Lord's. He scored three runs in the first innings in which he batted and a duck in the second innings.

Baker worked as a bricklayer's labourer and later became an engine fitter, moving to Stratford in Essex. His brother was employed for a time at the same works.

== Bibliography ==
- Carlaw, Derek (2020). Kent County Cricketers, A to Z: Part One (1806–1914) (PDF). Cardiff: ACS.
