= Penelope Ligonier =

English aristocrat and socialite (1749-1827)

The Honourable Penelope Ligonier
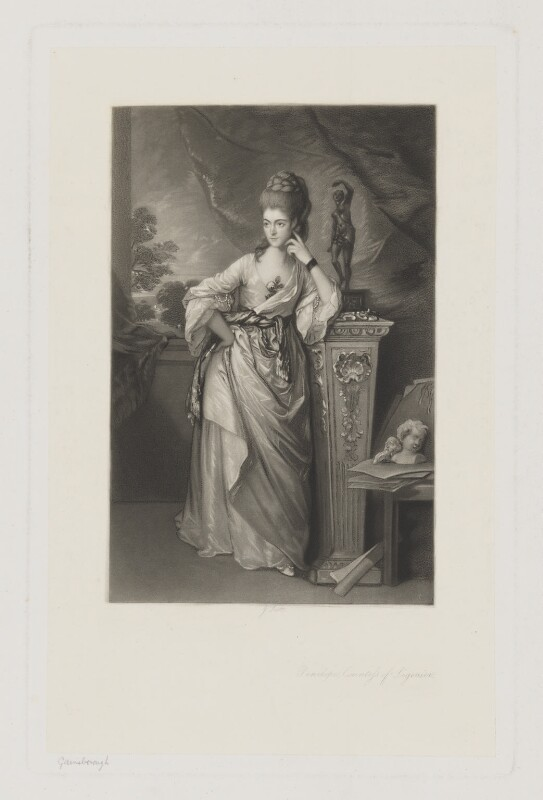
- Born: Penelope Pitt; February 23, 1749
- Died: March 1827 (aged 78); Isle of Wight
- Spouses: Edward Ligonier, Viscount Ligonier (m. 1766; div. 1772) Joseph Brown (m. 1784)
- Father: George Pitt, 1st Baron Rivers

Hon. Penelope Ligonier (née Pitt; later Brown; 23 February 1749 – March 1827), styled Viscountess Ligonier from 1766–1772, was an English aristocrat and socialite. She is most remembered for her affair with the Italian poet Count Alfieri, which led him to a duel with her husband Edward, Viscount Ligonier, followed by an adultery trial.

== Early life ==
Ligonier was the eldest daughter of Penelope Atkins (c. 1724–1795) and George Pitt, 1st Baron Rivers. Both her parents were 'noted for their extraordinary physical beauty', but their family life was unhappy due to her parents' turbulent marriage. Horace Walpole, an admirer of Penelope Atkins, alleged that George Pitt 'had heaped on her every possible cruelty and provoking outrage', and alleged that after their separation he prevented her from seeing their four children.

== Marriages ==
During the 1760s, while George Pitt was serving as envoy-extraordinary and minister plenipotentiary to Turin, Penelope was enrolled in a convent school in Lyon, where she met Edward Ligonier, a British soldier of French Huguenot origin. They were married at the British Embassy in Paris on 16 December 1766.

When they relocated to Cobham Park after their marriage they continued to entertain an international circle of friends, one of whom was Count Vittorio Amedeo Alfieri, an Italian poet and dramatist, with whom she began an affair. The discovery of her infidelity by her husband in 1771 led to a duel between Alfieri and Ligonier in Hyde Park, followed by a criminal conversation, trial which made public the salacious testimony of servants, and extracts from the couple's passionate love letters. A fictionalised version of the relationship appeared titled The Generous Husband; or, The History of Lord Lelius and the Fair Emilia, and Alfieri would later include a sensational account of his liaison with Lady Ligonier in his memoirs.

Ligonier would eventually divorce her via the expensive and protracted process of a private parliamentary bill dissolving the marriage, enacted in 1772. However, due to rumours of previous relationships between Penelope and members of her household staff, Count Alfieri refused to marry her and salvage her reputation.

After the divorce trial, Ligonier took a 12-week trip to Italy to escape from the scandal, accompanied by Alfieri, her mother, and her sister-in-law Frances Balfour. On her return to England, she returned to live in a cottage on the outskirts of her father's estate at her father's request.

She joined a circle of contemporary aristocratic women who could still participate in polite London society, but as a result of scandalous personal lives were generally considered courtesans by wider society as a result of their personal choices. She was a prominent member of the New Female Coterie, a social club founded for such women, alongside such personal friends and fellow 'demi-reps' as Lady Grosvenor and Seymour Dorothy Fleming. Her reputation for licentiousness was so strong that she was featured in a satirical 1777 cartoon of licentious aristocratic women called "The Diabo-Lady" in The London Magazine.

Meanwhile, her ex-husband was created Earl Ligonier in 1776, reviving the title of his famed uncle, Field Marshal John Ligonier, 1st Earl Ligonier, who died without an heir.

On 28 April 1784 at St Giles' Church, Northampton, she married Joseph Brown, a private in the Royal Horse Guard Blues.

In April 1791, she wrote to Alfieri that their affair had liberated her from the constraints "of a world in which I was never formed to exist", and her contentment and health in her life after leaving her first marriage.

She resided in West Cowes on the Isle of Wight until her death. She was buried 24 March 1827 at Northwood, Isle of Wight.
