= 13th Hussars =

British Army cavalry regiment

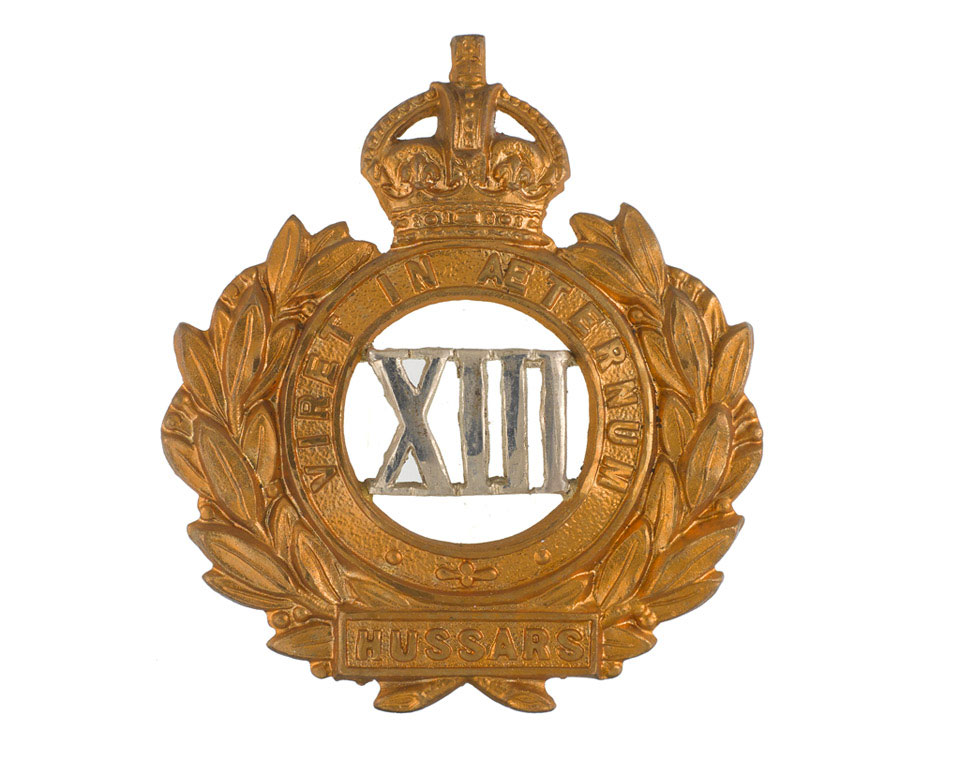
- c. 1910 regimental cap badge for officers
- Active: 1715–1922
- Country: Great Britain (1715–1800); United Kingdom (1801–1922)
- Branch: British Army
- Type: Cavalry
- Size: Regiment
- Nicknames: The Lily-Whites; The Ragged Brigade
- Motto: Viret in aeternum (It Flourishes Forever)

Commanders
- Notable commanders: Field Marshal Sir Robert Rich Major-General William Stanhope, 1st Earl of Harrington; Lieutenant-General Henry Hawley; Lieutenant-General Humphrey Bland; Colonel James Gardiner; Major General Sir Charles Powlett; Field Marshal Henry Seymour Conway; General Sir Baker Russell Lieutenant-General Robert Baden-Powell, 1st Baron Baden-Powell

The 13th Hussars was a cavalry regiment of the British Army raised in 1715. It saw service for three centuries including the Napoleonic Wars, the Crimean War and the First World War but then amalgamated with the 18th Royal Hussars, to form the 13th/18th Royal Hussars in 1922.

== History ==
=== Early wars ===
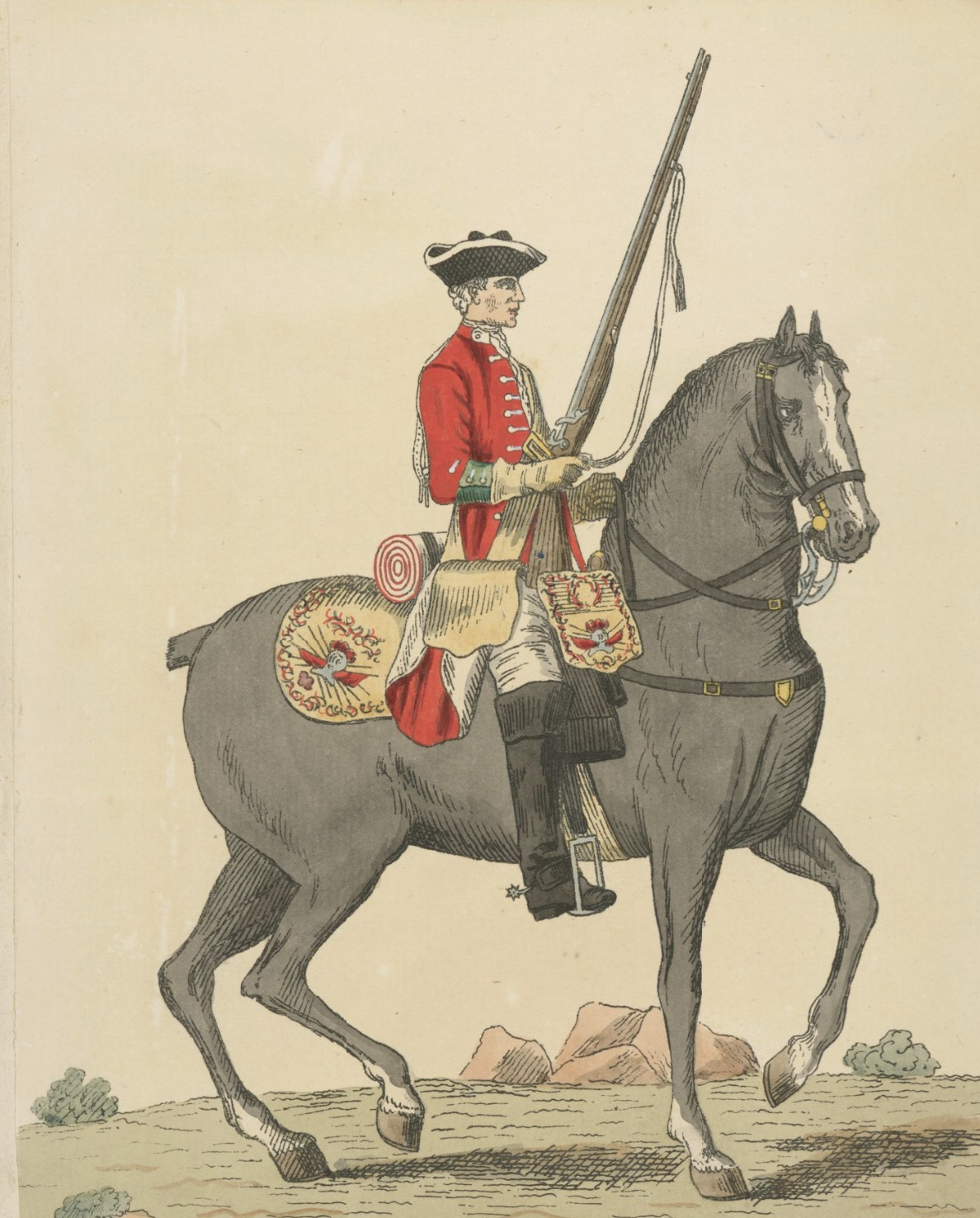
c. 1742 engraving of a regimental private

c. 1751 painting of a regimental private

The regiment was raised in the Midlands by Richard Munden as Richard Munden’s Regiment of Dragoons in 1715 as part of the response to the Jacobite rebellion. It took part in the Battle of Preston in November 1715 after which it escorted the rebels to the nearest prisons. The regiment was sent to Ireland in 1718 and remained there until 1742.

During the Jacobite rising of 1745, it was commanded by James Gardiner; largely composed of recruits, on 16 September the regiment was routed by a small party of Highlanders in the so-called 'Coltbridge Canter.' Demoralised by this, it did the same at the Battle of Prestonpans on 21 September, which lasted 15 minutes and where Gardiner was killed and the equally disastrous Battle of Falkirk Muir in January 1746. Shortly after this, Gardiner's replacement Francis Ligonier died of sickness and was replaced by Philip Naison.

The regiment returned to Ireland in 1749 and was re-titled the 13th Regiment of Dragoons in 1751. It was involved in putting down a minor rebellion by George Robert FitzGerald in 1781 and it converted into light dragoons in 1783, being renamed the 13th Light Dragoons. A detachment from the regiment was sent to Jamaica in September 1795 and returned in July 1798.

=== Peninsular War ===
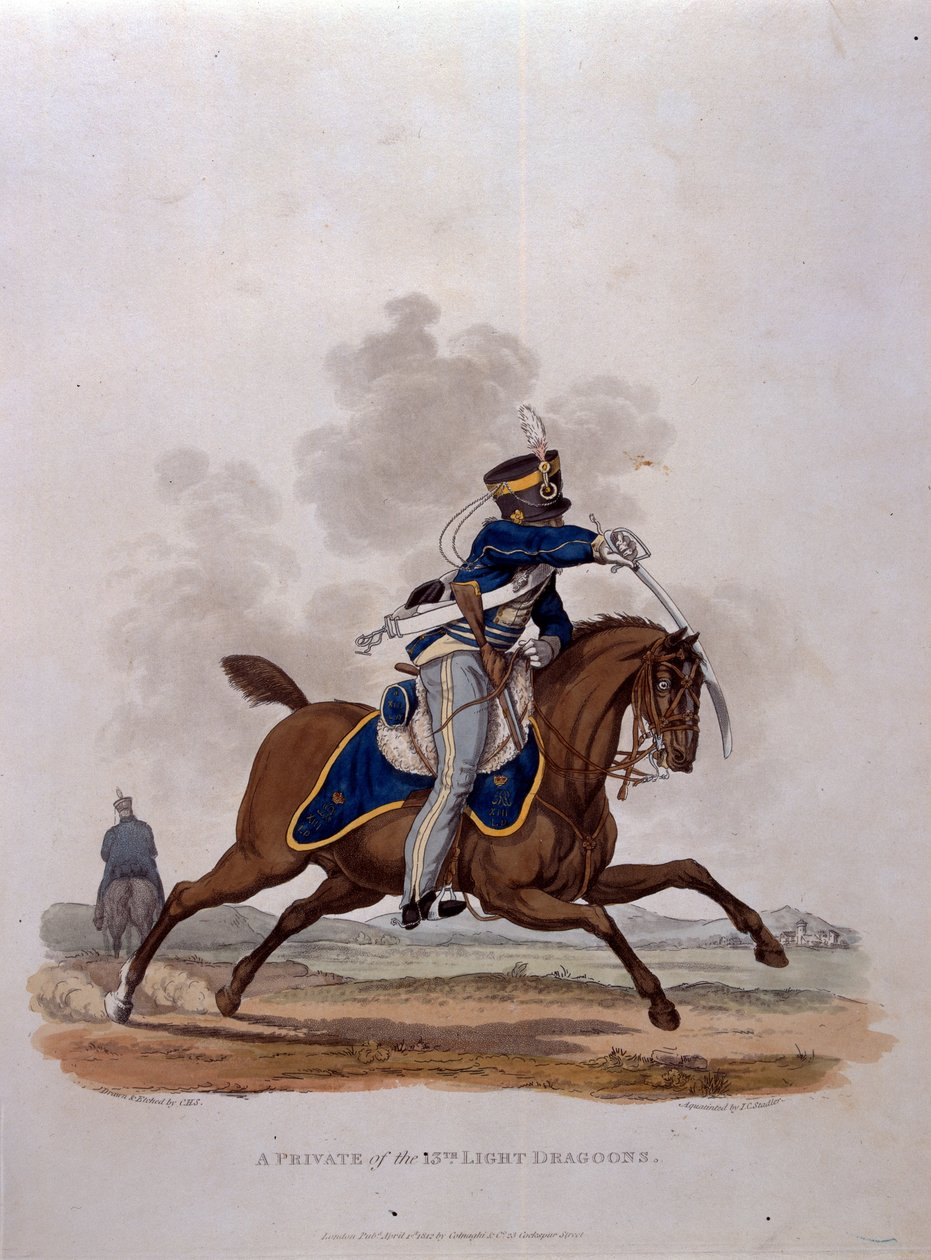
1812 engraving of a regimental private

In February 1810 the regiment sailed for Lisbon for service in the Peninsular War. It took part in the Battle of Campo Maior on the Spanish-Portuguese border on 25 March 1811 in a clash that occurred between British and Portuguese cavalry, under Robert Ballard Long, and a force of French infantry and cavalry under General Latour-Maubourg. The regiment, two and a half squadrons strong, led by Colonel Michael Head, charged and routed a superior French cavalry force of no less than six squadrons. The regiment, with two Portuguese squadrons, then went on to pursue the French for seven miles to the outskirts of Badajoz. The report reaching Lord Wellington seems to have glossed over the epic quality of the charge and emphasised the overlong pursuit. After receiving Marshal Beresford's report, Wellington issued a particularly harsh reprimand to the regiment calling them "a rabble" and threatening to remove their horses from them and send the regiment to do duty at Lisbon. The officers of the regiment then wrote a collective letter to Wellington detailing the particulars of the action. Wellington is reported as saying that had he known the full facts he would never have issued the reprimand. The historian Sir John Fortescue wrote, "Of the performance of Thirteenth, who did not exceed two hundred men, in defeating twice or thrice their numbers single-handed, it is difficult to speak too highly."

The regiment formed part of Beresford's Allied-Spanish Army at the Battle of Albuera on 16 May 1811. The French army, commanded by Marshal Jean-de-Dieu Soult, Duc de Dalmatie, was attempting to relieve the French garrison of the border fortress of Badajoz. Only after bloody and fierce fighting, and the steadfastness of the British infantry, did the allies carry the day. The regiment, which was unbrigaded, formed part of the cavalry force commanded initially by Brigadier Robert Ballard Long and, later in the battle, by Major General Sir William Lumley.

The regiment also saw action at the Battle of Arroyo dos Molinos (October 1811), under Rowland Hill at the Combat of Navas de Membrillo (December 1811), at the Siege of Badajoz (March 1812) and, as part of the 2nd Brigade under Colonel Colquohon Grant, at the Battle of Vitoria (June 1813). The regiment advanced into France and fought at the Battle of the Nive (December 1813), at the Battle of Orthez (February 1814) and at the Battle of Toulouse (April 1814).

=== Waterloo ===
The regiment, commanded by Lieutenant-Colonel Shapland Boyse and forming part of the 7th Cavalry Brigade, but operationally attached to the 5th Cavalry Brigade, next took part in the Battle of Waterloo in June 1815. The regiment charged repeatedly during the day and completely routed a square of French infantry. An officer of the 13th wrote:

Our last and most brilliant charge, was at the moment that Lord Hill, perceiving the movement of the Prussian army, and finding the French Imperial Guard on the point of forcing a part of the British position, cried out, - "Drive them back, 13th!" such an order from such a man, could not be misconstrued, and it was punctually obeyed.

At that battle the armies of Field Marshal the Duke of Wellington and Generalfeldmarschall Gebhard Leberecht von Blücher decisively defeated the armies of the Emperor Napoleon Bonaparte.

=== Crimean War ===
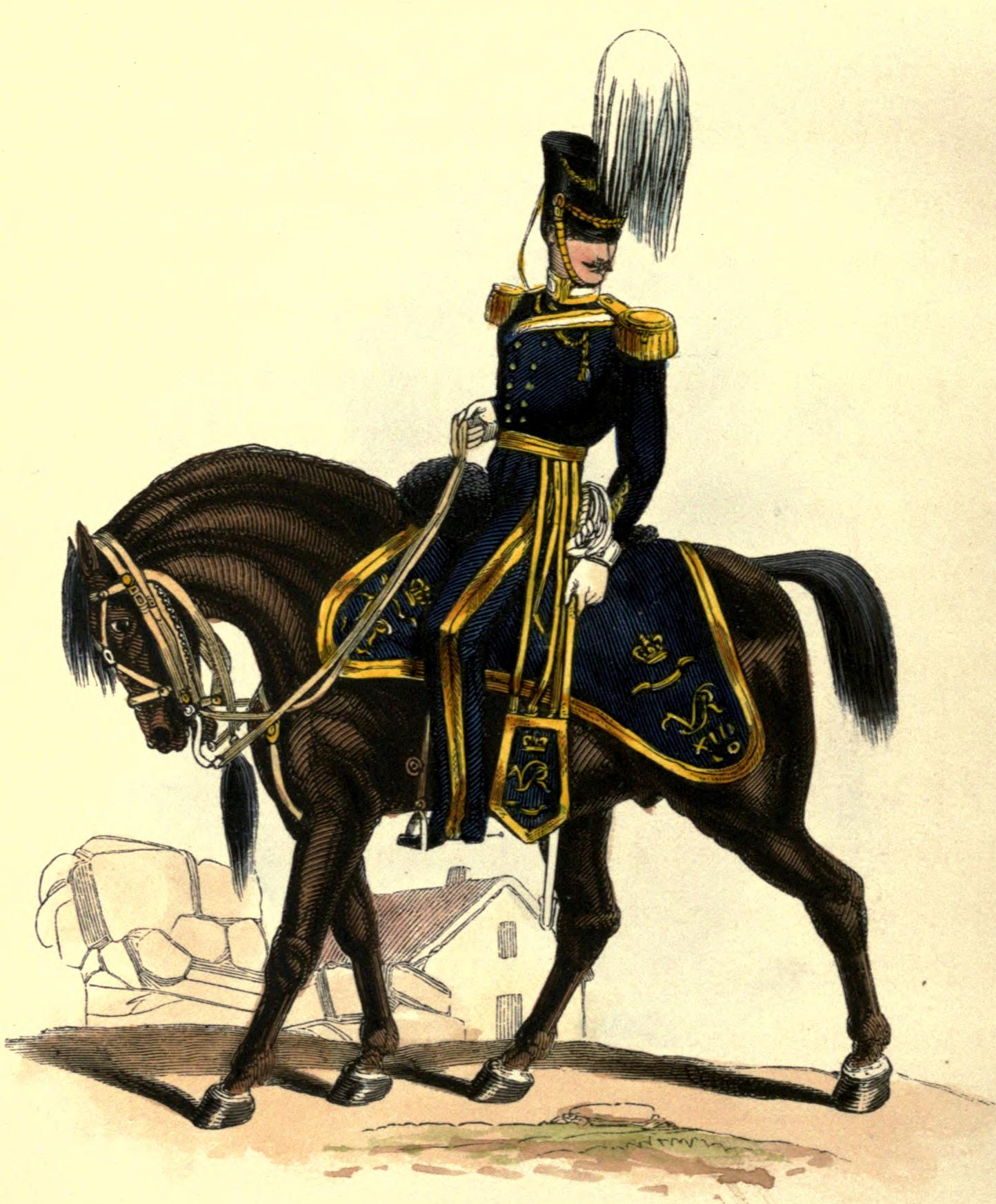
c. 1842 illustration of a regimental officer

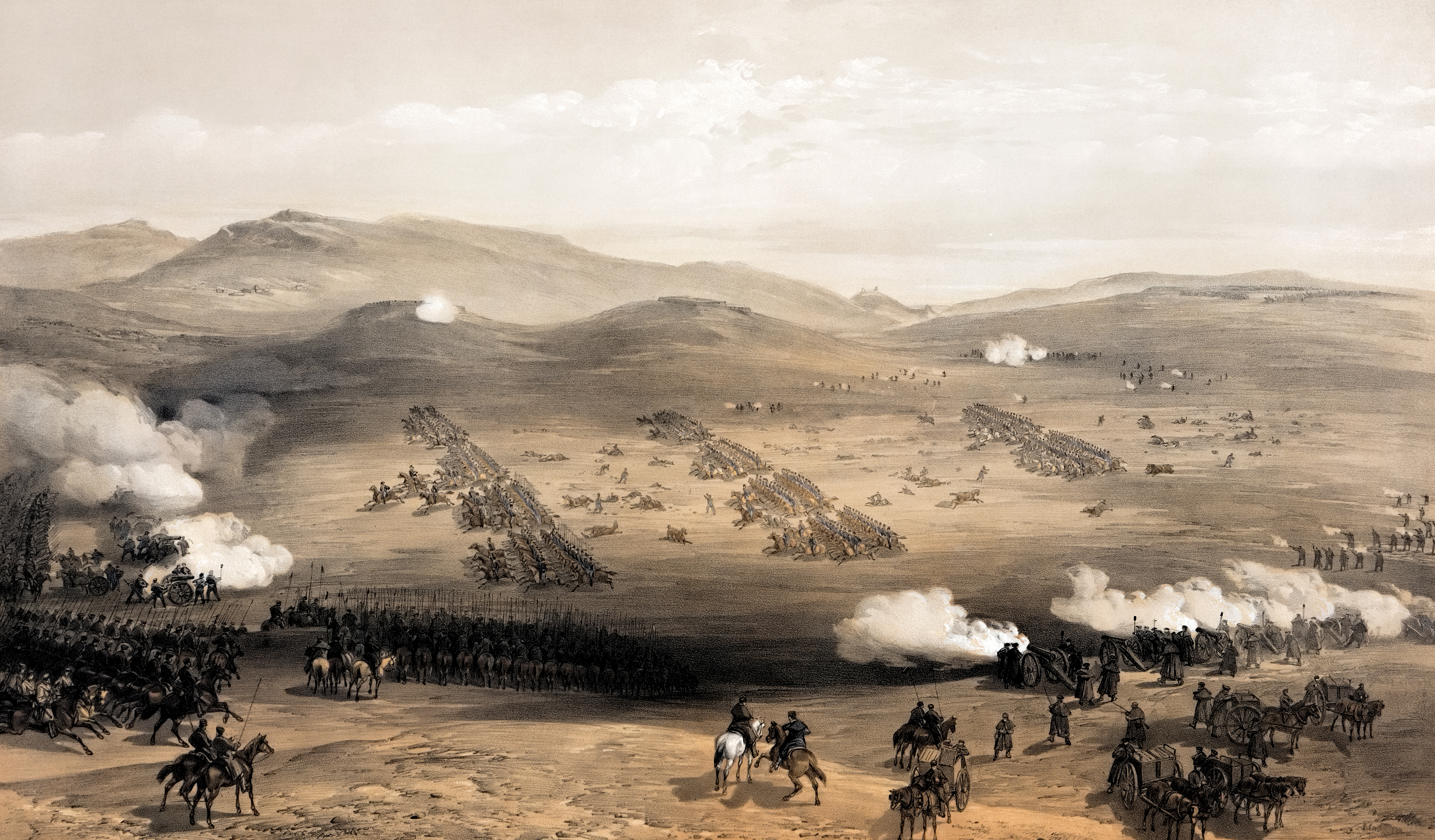
The Charge of the Light Brigade; the regiment was positioned in the first line of cavalry's right flank

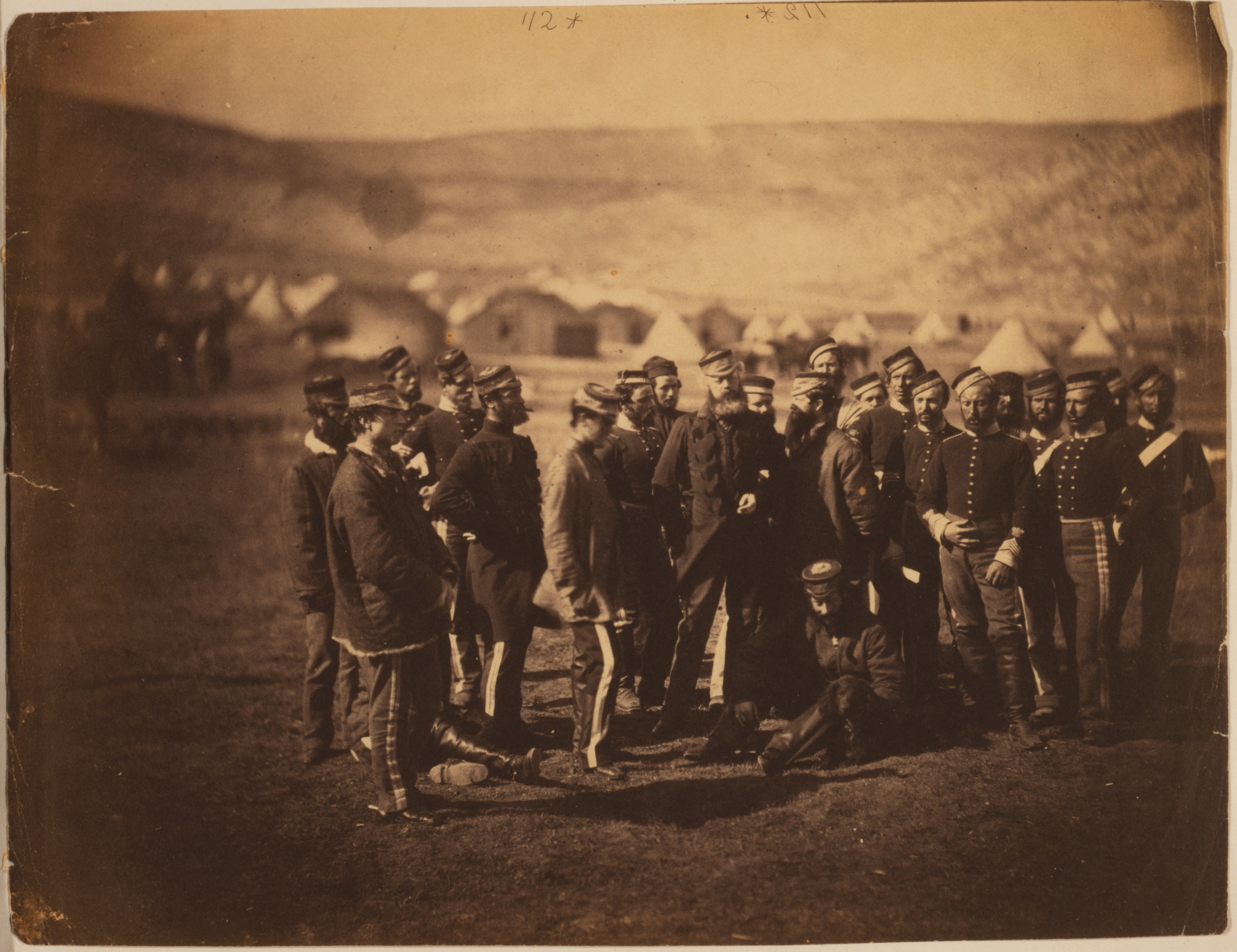
Regimental troops who survived the Charge of the Light Brigade

The regiment next saw action, as part of the light brigade under the command of Major General the Earl of Cardigan, at the Battle of Alma in September 1854. The regiment was in the first line of cavalry on the right flank during the Charge of the Light Brigade at the Battle of Balaclava in October 1854. The brigade drove through the Russian artillery before smashing straight into the Russian cavalry and pushing them back; it was unable to consolidate its position, however, having insufficient forces and had to withdraw to its starting position, coming under further attack as it did so. The regiment lost three officers and 38 men in the debacle. Lance-Sergeant Joseph Malone of E Troop was awarded the Victoria Cross for his actions during the battle. The regiment also took part in the Battle of Inkerman in November 1854: the regiment played a minor role, although Captain Jenyns complained:

They put us under a very heavy fire at Inkerman, but luckily for us - and no thanks to any General - we had a slight rise on our flank, which ricocheted the balls just over our heads. Some ship's shells bowled over a few men and horses though. It was useless, as we could not act.

The regiment went on to take part in the siege of Sevastopol in winter 1854. On 8 April 1861 the regiment was renamed the 13th Hussars and in April 1862 the regiment started wearing hussar uniform. The regiment departed for Canada in September 1866 as part of the response to the Fenian raids and sailed for India in January 1874. Robert Baden-Powell, the future leader of the scouts, joined the regiment in India in 1876. The regiment served in Afghanistan but saw no action during the Second Anglo-Afghan War.

=== The Second Boer War ===
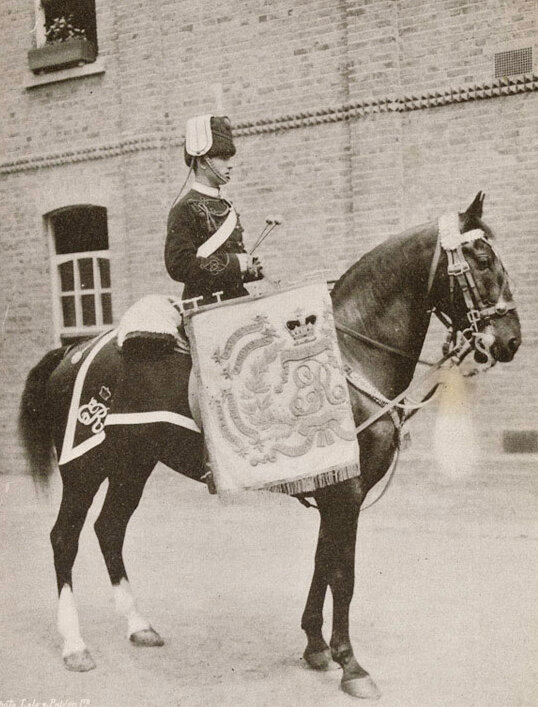
A regimental drummer in c. 1912

The regiment arrived in South Africa in December 1899 and took part in the Battle of Colenso during the Second Boer War. It formed part of Colonel Burn-Murdoch's Brigade and had a minor part in the Relief of Ladysmith in February 1900. The regiment stayed in South Africa throughout the hostilities, which ended with the Peace of Vereeniging on 31 May 1902. Following the end of the war, 556 officers and men of the regiment left South Africa on the SS City of Vienna, which arrived at Southampton in October 1902.

=== First World War ===
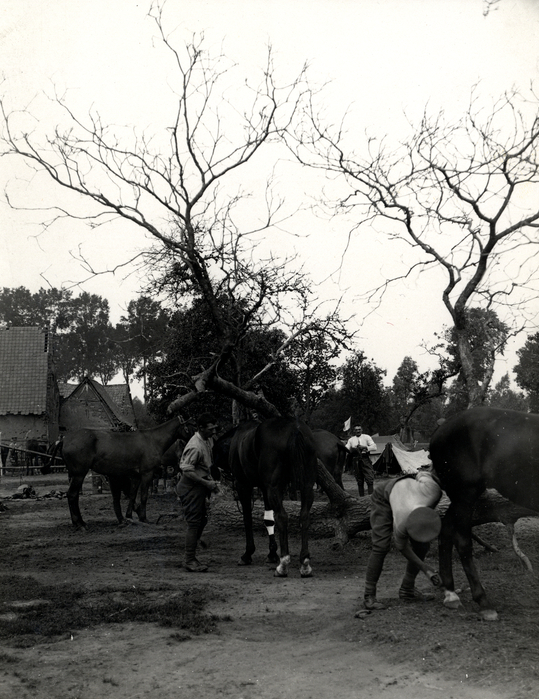
Regimental troops bivouacked in Aire, 1915

The regiment, which was based in Meerut in India at the start of the war, landed in Marseille as part of the 7th (Meerut) Cavalry Brigade in the 2nd Indian Cavalry Division in December 1914 for action on the Western Front. The regiment then moved to Mesopotamia, with the same brigade, in July 1916. The regiment took part in the Second Battle of Kut in February 1917, the capture of Baghdad in March 1917 and the Battle of Sharqat in October 1918. At Sharquat the regiment charged the hill where the Turkish guns were, and made a dismounted charge up it with fixed bayonets, successfully capturing the guns: İsmail Hakkı Bey, the Turkish commander, was aware of the peace talks at Mudros, and decided to spare his men rather than fight or break out, surrendering on 30 October 1918. In 1922 the regiment amalgamated with the 18th Royal Hussars to form the 13th/18th Royal Hussars.

== Regimental museum ==
The regimental collection is held by the Discovery Museum in Newcastle upon Tyne.

== Colonels ==
The colonels of the regiment were as follows: 13th Regiment of Dragoons

- 1715 Brig-Gen. Richard Munden — Munden's Regiment of Dragoons
- 1722 F.M. Sir Robert Rich — Rich's Regiment of Dragoons
- 1725 Maj-Gen. William Stanhope, 1st Earl of Harrington — Stanhope's Regiment of Dragoons
- 1730 Lt-Gen. Henry Hawley — Hawley's Regiment of Dragoons
- 1740 Col. Robert Dalway — Dalway's Regiment of Dragoons
- 1741 Lt-Gen. Humphrey Bland — Bland's Regiment of Dragoons
- 1743 Col. James Gardiner, killed at Prestonpans, September 1745; Gardiner's Regiment of Dragoons
- 1745 Col. Francis Ligonier; died of pleurisy, 26 January 1746; Ligonier's Regiment of Dragoons
- 1746 Col. Peter Naison — Naison's Regiment of Dragoons

A royal warrant provided that in future regiments would not be known by their colonels' names, but by their "number or rank" on 1 July 1751

- 1751 Maj-Gen. Sir Charles Powlett
- 1751 F.M. Henry Seymour Conway
- 1754 Gen. John Mostyn
- 1758 Lt-Gen. Archibald Douglas
- 1778 Lt-Gen. Sir Richard Pierson
- 1781 Gen. Francis Craig

From 1783 13th Regiment of Light Dragoons:

- 1811 Gen. Hon. Sir Henry George Grey
- 1845 Gen. Hon. Edward Pyndar Lygon
- 1860 Lt-Gen. Allan Thomas Maclean

From 1861 13th Hussars:

- 1868 Gen. John Lawrenson
- 1871 Lt-Col Fitzroy Maclean
- 1883 Lt-Gen. Broadley Harrison
- 1890 Lt-Gen. Richard Buckley Prettejohn
- 1891 Gen. Sir William Henry Seymour
- 1894 Gen. Sir Baker Russell
- 1911 Lt-Gen. Robert Baden-Powell, 1st Baron Baden-Powell

In 1922 the regiment amalgamated with the 18th Royal Hussars to form the 13th/18th Royal Hussars

== Battle honours ==
The regiment’s battle honours were as follows:

- Early Wars: Albuhera, Vittoria, Orthes, Toulouse, Peninsula, Waterloo, Alma, Balaklava, Inkerman, Sevastopol, Relief of Ladysmith, South Africa 1899-1902
- The Great War: France and Flanders 1914-16, Kut al Amara 1917, Baghdad, Sharqat, Mesopotamia 1916-18

== See also ==
- British cavalry during the First World War

== Sources ==
- Adkin, Mark (2001), The Waterloo Companion, Aurum, ISBN 978-1-85410-764-0
- Cannon, Richard (1842). Historical Record of the Thirteenth Regiment of Light Dragoons containing an account of the formation of the regiment in 1715 and of its subsequent services to 1842. John W. Parker.
- Erickson, Edward J. (2001). Ordered to Die: A history of the Ottoman Army in the First World War. Greenwood Press, Wesport. ISBN 978-0313315169.
- Fletcher, I. (1999). Galloping at Everything: The British Cavalry in the Peninsula and at Waterloo 1808-15. Spellmount, Staplehurst. ISBN 978-1-86227-016-9.
- Thomson, Colonel J. Anstruther (1904). Eighty years' reminiscences. Longmans, Green & Co.
