= Francis Ligonier =

French-born British Army officer

Francis Augustus Ligonier (1693 – 25 January 1746) was a French-born officer of the British Army.

== Biography ==
He was born François-Auguste de Ligonnier at Castres, Languedoc the third of five surviving sons of the Huguenot Louis de Ligonnier, sieur of Monteuquet, and his wife Louise du Poncet. The second son John (Jean-Louis) emigrated in 1697 and entered the British service in 1702, and another brother Anthony (Antoine) went to England in 1698, dying as a major in the British Army.

Francis Ligonier moved to England in 1710 and was secured a commission as ensign in Phillips's 12th Regiment of Foot through his brother John, who had been made lieutenant-colonel of the regiment in 1711. After service at Menorca the brothers returned to England in 1716, and Ligonier transferred to the Royal Regiment of Horse Guards (the Blues) as a cornet. He was promoted to lieutenant in the Blues in 1720 and captain in the 9th Regiment of Dragoons (Wynne's) in 1722. In 1729 he was promoted major in the 8th Regiment of Horse (the Black Horse), of which John Ligonier had been made colonel in 1720, later commanding the regiment as its lieutenant-colonel. The Black Horse formed part of the garrison in Ireland, and Ligonier was made joint Chief Ranger of Ireland with his brother and Lord John Sackville in 1736.

Ligonier was badly wounded while commanding the Black Horse at the Battle of Dettingen on 27 June 1743. On 25 April 1745 he left the regiment to become colonel of the 59th (later 48th) Regiment of Foot, and was made colonel of the 13th Dragoons on 1 October 1745. The previous colonel of the 13th, James Gardiner, had been killed at the Battle of Prestonpans after being deserted by his men, and George II gave the regiment to Ligonier saying he "would give them an officer who should show them how to fight". Ligonier held both colonelcies simultaneously, a rare occurrence. Though previously confined to bed with a chest infection, Ligonier took over command of a brigade of Henry Hawley's dragoons for the Battle of Falkirk Muir on 16 January 1746. He contracted pleurisy and died at Edinburgh on 25 January, where he was buried five days later.

John Ligonier erected a monument to his brother in the south cloister of Westminster Abbey. The sculptor was Louis-François Roubiliac and the inscription reads:

Sacred to FRANCIS LIGONIER Esq Colonel of Dragoons, a native of France, descended from a very ancient and very Honble. family there; but a zealous Protestant and subject of England, sacrificing himself in its defence, against a POPISH PRETENDER at the BATTLE OF FALKIRK, in the year 1745. A distemper could not confine him to his bed when duty called him into the field, where he chose to meet death, rather than in the arms of his friends. But the disease proved more victorious than the enemy. He expired soon after the battle where under all the agonies of sickness and pain, he exerted a spirit of vigour and heroism. To the memory of such a brave and beloved brother, this monument is placed by Sir JOHN LIGONIER, Knight of the Bath, General of Horse in the British Army, with just grief, and brotherly affection.

Ligonier left two illegitimate children from a relationship with a widow named Anne Murray (née Freeman): Edward and Frances. Care of the children was given to their uncle John Ligonier, and Edward was made heir-apparent to the title of Viscount Ligonier of Clonmell created in 1762, succeeding on his uncle's death in 1770. Frances married Colonel Thomas Balfour (1752–1799) and was the mother of the novelist Mary Brunton.

Military offices
Preceded by Lord Henry Beauclerk	Colonel of Ligonier's Regiment of Foot; 1745–1746	Succeeded by Hon. Henry Seymour Conway
Preceded by James Gardiner	Colonel of Ligonier's Regiment of Dragoons; 1745–1746	Succeeded by Peter Naison
