= George Baker (cricketer, born 1838) =

English cricketer (1838–1870)

George Baker (31 May 1838 – 2 June 1870) was an English cricketer active between 1859 and 1863. Baker was born in Cobham, Kent and played 27 first-class cricket matches in his career, including 22 for Kent County Cricket Club and three for Marylebone Cricket Club (MCC). His brother William played one first-class match for Kent in 1858. He died in Lydd in 1870 aged 32.

== Bibliography ==
- Carlaw, Derek (2020). Kent County Cricketers, A to Z: Part One (1806–1914) (PDF). Cardiff: ACS.
