= James Gardiner (British Army officer) =

British army officer

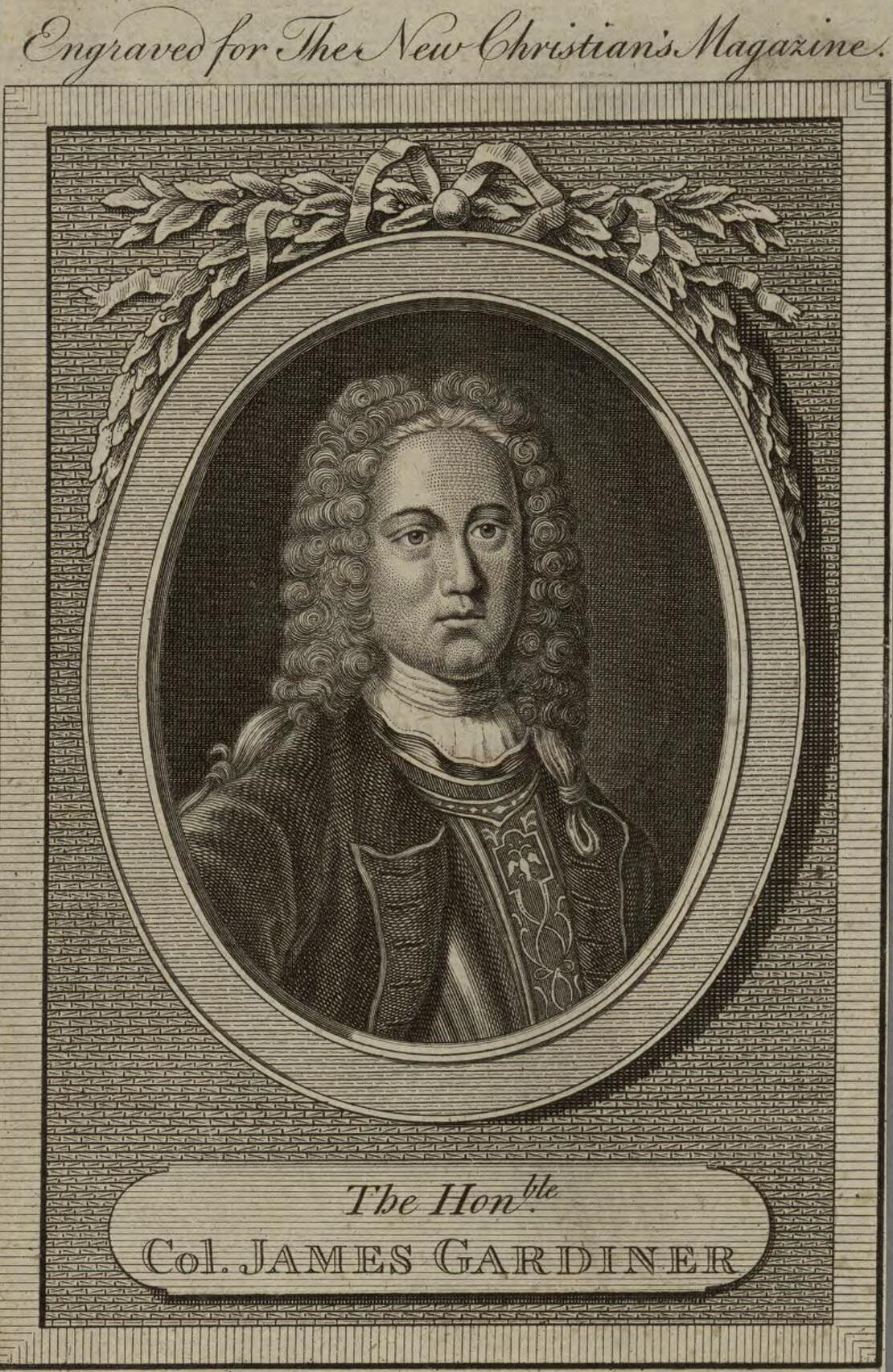
- Born: 11 January 1688; Bo'ness, Kingdom of Scotland
- Died: 21 September 1745 (aged 57); Prestonpans, Scotland, Kingdom of Great Britain
- Children: 13
- Military career
- Allegiance: Dutch Republic; Kingdom of England; Kingdom of Great Britain
- Service years: 1702 (Dutch Republic); 1702–1707 (Kingdom of England); 1707-1745 (Kingdom of Great Britain)
- Conflicts: War of the Spanish Succession Battle of Ramillies War of the Austrian Succession Battle of Prestonpans †

Colonel James Gardiner (11 January 1688 – 21 September 1745) was a Scottish soldier serving in the Dutch, English, and British armies, including during the 1745 Jacobite rising, in which he was killed at the Battle of Prestonpans.

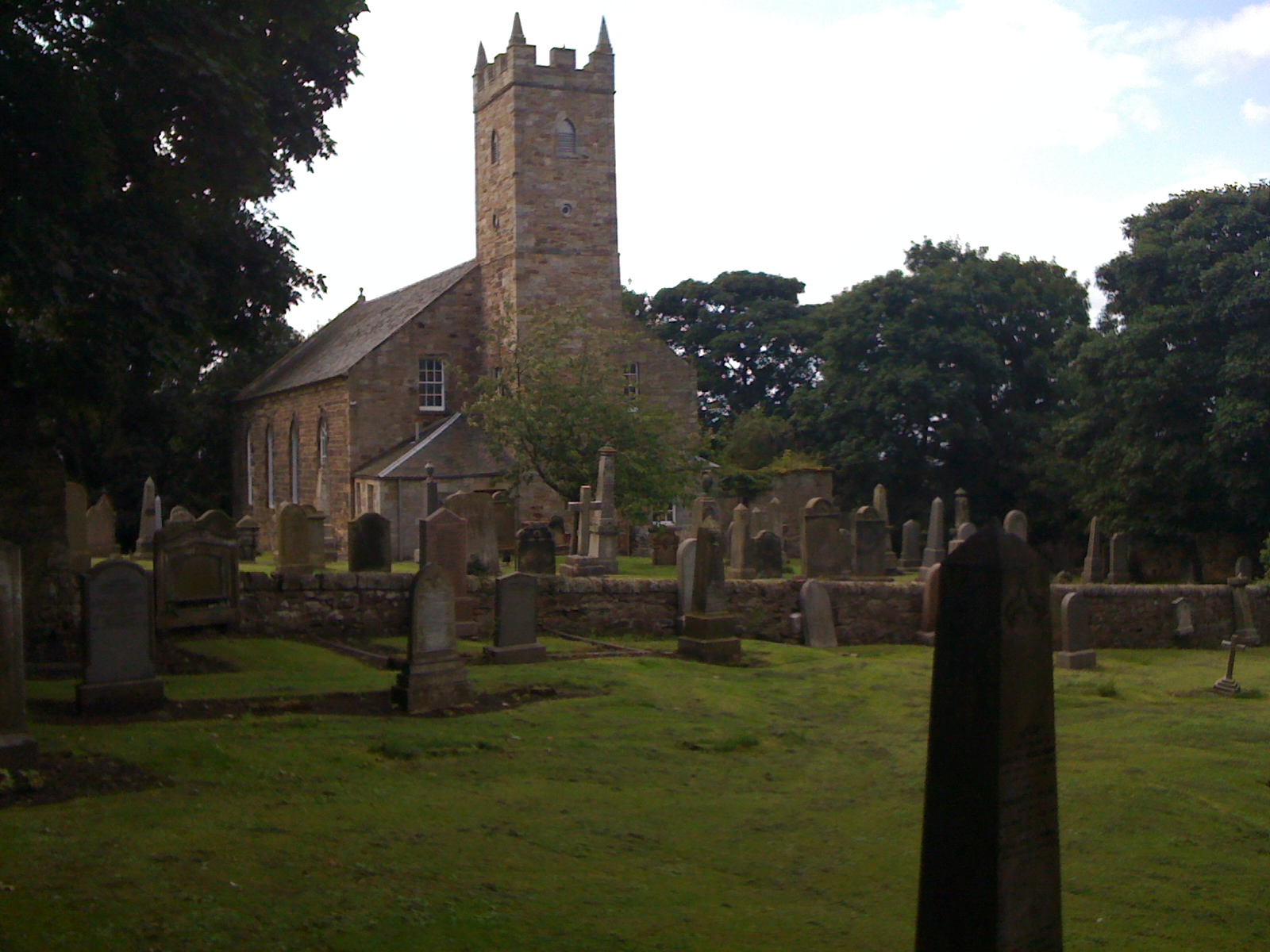
Tranent Church, burial place of Colonel Gardiner

== Life ==
Gardiner was born in Carriden, educated in Linlithgow, and joined a Scottish unit of the Dutch States Army (likely the Scots Brigade) at the age of fourteen. Shortly after, he received a commission as an ensign in the English Army from Queen Anne. He served England and Great Britain with distinction in several battles and was promoted through the ranks to Colonel in 1743.

Known as a rake in his youth, Gardiner had a religious experience in 1719 and became devout. In 1726, he married Frances Erskine, daughter to David Erskine; five of their 13 children survived to adulthood.

During the Battle of Ramillies, he was shot through the mouth and nearly killed by a French soldier who had returned to plunder the dead. However, Gardiner was spared after being mistaken for a French soldier.

At the Battle of Prestonpans, he was mortally wounded by the Highlanders after his dragoons had fled the field and he was attempting to rally some foot soldiers. He received a mortal blow whilst wounded on the ground and was stripped to the waist as his possessions were looted by the Highlanders. After the battle Gardiner was carried from the field by a servant to nearby Tranent where he soon died. By a quirk of fate Gardiner lived close to the battlefield in Bankton House.

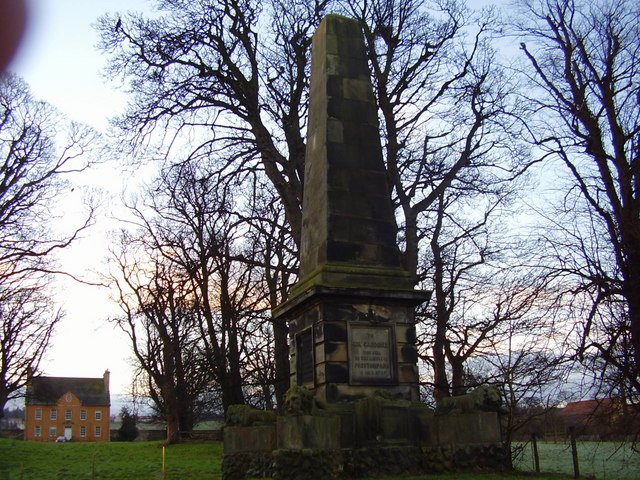
Monument to Col. Gardiner at Prestonpans, with Bankton House in the background

== Memorials ==
An influential biography was written by Philip Doddridge. He is commemorated locally with a memorial obelisk, erected by public subscription in 1853 in the grounds of Bankton House. A late twentieth century monument on the battlefield marks approximately where he fell.

The play, Colonel Gardiner: Vice and Virtue, written by playwright Andrew Dallmeyer was performed as part of Prestonpans' 2009 Homecoming celebrations. He features as a character in Walter Scott's novel Waverley, in which Edward Waverley briefly serves as an officer in his dragoon regiment towards the start of the Jacobite uprising. In the novel he is described as "tall, handsome and active, though somewhat advanced in years".

Military offices
Preceded by Humphrey Bland	Colonel of Gardiner's Regiment of Dragoons; 1743–1745	Succeeded by Francis Ligonier
