= Earl Ligonier =

Earldom in the Peerage of Great Britain and Peerage of Ireland

Earldom of Ligonier
- Creation date: 10 September 1766 (first creation); 19 July 1776 (second creation)
- Created by: King George III
- Peerage: Peerage of Great Britain (first creation); Peerage of Ireland (second creation)
- First holder: Sir John Ligonier, Viscount Ligonier (first creation); Edward Ligonier (second creation)
- Last holder: Edward Ligonier, 1st Earl Ligonier
- Remainder to: Heirs male of the body of the first earl lawfully begotten
- Subsidiary titles: Viscount Ligonier of Enniskillen (1757); Viscount Ligonier of Clonmell (1757); Baron Ligonier of Ripley (1763)
- Status: Extinct
- Extinction date: 14 June 1782)
- Former seat: Cobham Park
- Motto: A Rege et Victoria (The King and Victory)

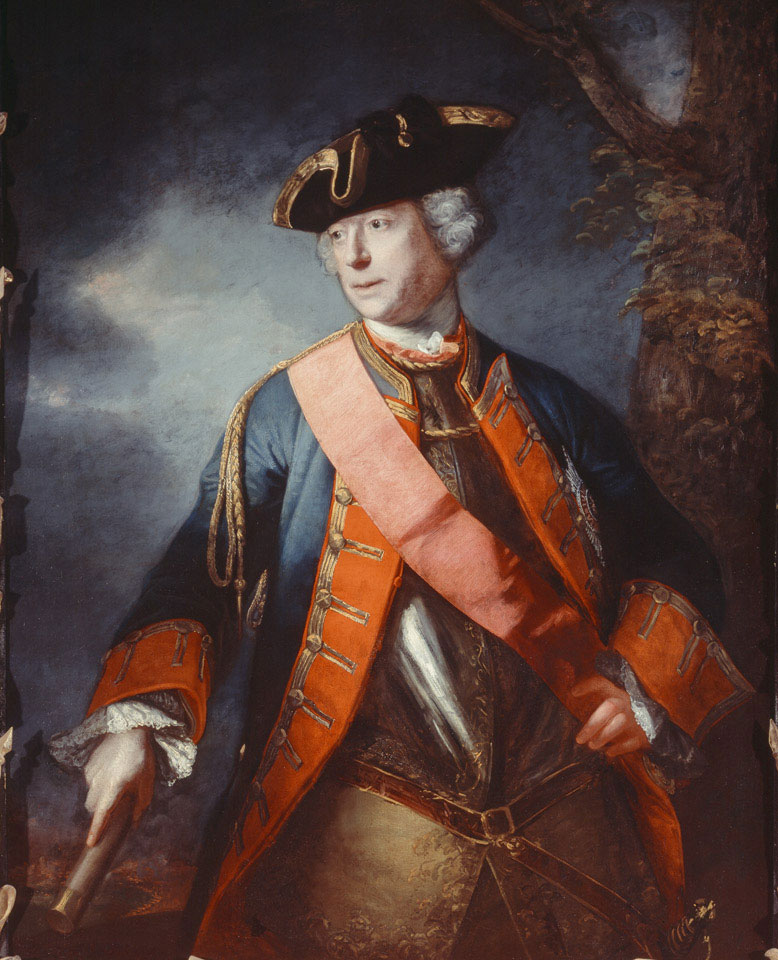
John Ligonier, 1st Earl Ligonier

Earl Ligonier was a title that was created twice in British history, once in the Peerage of Great Britain and once in the Peerage of Ireland.

The first creation came in the Peerage of Great Britain on 10 September 1766 in favour of the French Huguenot soldier Field Marshal Sir John Ligonier, who served more than 60 years in the British Army. The peerage was created with normal remainder to the heirs male of his body. He had already been created Viscount Ligonier, of Enniskillen, in the Peerage of Ireland on 31 December 1757, with normal remainder to the heirs male of his body, and Viscount Ligonier, of Clonmell, in the Peerage of Ireland on 20 May 1762, with remainder to his nephew, Edward Ligonier.

In 1763, he was also created Baron Ligonier of Ripley, in the County of Surrey, in the Peerage of Great Britain, with normal remainder to the heirs male of his body. The barony, viscountcy of 1757 and earldom became extinct on his death on 28 April 1770 while he was succeeded in the viscountcy of 1762 according to the special remainder by his nephew, the second Viscount.

Edward Ligonier was the illegitimate son of Colonel Francis Augustus Ligonier, brother of the first Earl. On 19 July 1776, the earldom was revived when he was made Earl Ligonier, of Clonmell in the County of Tipperary, in the Peerage of Ireland. The titles became extinct on his death on 14 June 1782.

== Viscounts Ligonier (1762) ==
- Sir John Ligonier (1680–1770)
- Edward Ligonier, 2nd Viscount Ligonier (1740–1782) (created Earl Ligonier in 1776)

== Earls Ligonier; First creation (1766) ==
- John Louis Ligonier, 1st Viscount Ligonier (1680–1770)

== Earls Ligonier; Second creation (1776) ==
- Edward Ligonier, 1st Earl Ligonier (1740–1782)

== Arms ==
Coat of arms of Armorial of Earl of Ligonier
Notes Image shown is obverse of a standard carried at the Battle of Dettingen (27 June 1743) by the 8th Regiment of Horse, depicting the armorial achievement of the regiment's colonel Major-General John Ligonier Adopted 17 February 1744 Crest I. Out of a French Marquis's coronet proper, a demi-lion or II: Out of a mural crown, a demi-lion erminois, holding in his dexter paw a palm-branch proper Escutcheon Gules, a lion rampant or, on a chief argent, a crescent between two mullets azure Supporters Two lions regardant erminois, each gorged with a mural crown gules, & holding in one paw a banner emblazoned with the arms of Ligonier Motto A Rege et Victoria (The King and Victory)
