= Edward Ligonier, 1st Earl Ligonier =

British Army officer and courtier

Lieutenant-General The Right Honourable The Earl Ligonier KB
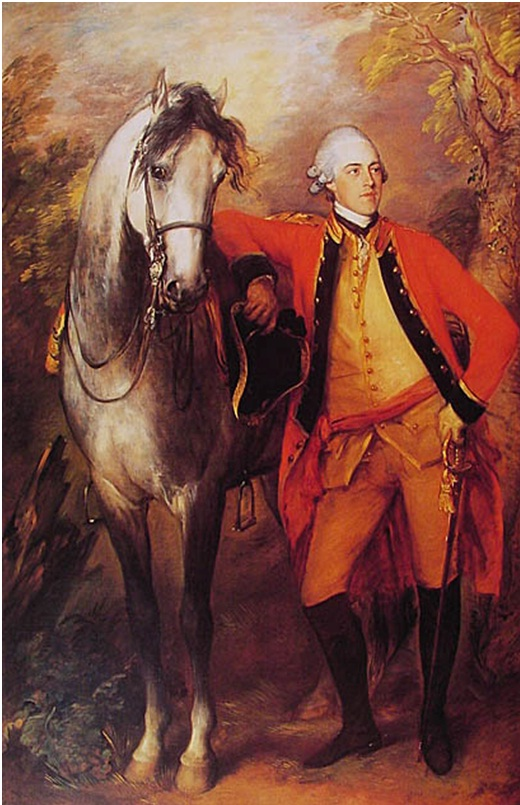
- Portrait by Thomas Gainsborough
- Birth name: Edward Ligonier
- Born: 1740
- Died: 14 June 1782 (aged 41–42)

Lieutenant-General Edward Ligonier, 1st Earl Ligonier, KB (1740 – 14 June 1782) was a British Army officer and courtier. He was the illegitimate son of Francis Augustus Ligonier, the brother of John Ligonier, 1st Earl Ligonier.

He served with Prince Ferdinand of Brunswick during the Seven Years' War, and was appointed a captain in the 1st Regiment of Foot Guards. In 1763, he was appointed a royal aide-de-camp, and from 1763 until 1765, he was secretary to the embassy at Madrid. On 12 November 1764, he was appointed a Groom of the Bedchamber to the Duke of Gloucester.

On 6 December 1766, he married Penelope Pitt, daughter of George Pitt, 1st Baron Rivers. Her relationship with Vittorio Amadeo, Count Alfieri, provoked a duel between her husband and her lover in Green Park on 7 May 1771, and Ligonier was able to obtain a divorce by Act of Parliament in 1772. He married Lady Mary Henley, daughter of Robert Henley, 1st Earl of Northington, on 14 December 1773. In the meantime, upon the death of his uncle, the Earl Ligonier, in 1770, he became Viscount Ligonier of Clonmel, which title had been created with a special remainder to him and inherited Cobham Park.

He was promoted major-general in 1775 and lieutenant-general in 1777. On 19 July 1776, he was created Earl Ligonier, of Clonmel, in the Peerage of Ireland. The last honour conferred upon him was his investiture as a Knight Companion of the Order of the Bath on 17 December 1781. He died on 14 June 1782, before he could be installed, and left no posterity. Cobham would be sold in 1806.

Military offices
Preceded by William Whitmore	Colonel of the 9th Regiment of Foot; 1771–1782	Succeeded by The Lord Saye and Sele
Peerage of Ireland
New title	Earl Ligonier; 1776–1782	Extinct
Preceded by John Ligonier	Viscount Ligonier; 1770–1782	Extinct
