= Richard Griffin and Company =

Publishers to the University of Glasgow

Richard Griffin & Co. was a bookselling, publishing and scientific equipment company owned by Charles Griffin, based in Glasgow, Scotland. In the 19th century it acted as publisher to the University of Glasgow.

It was one of the earliest of the Griffin group of publishers (founded c.1800), and still publishing today as Richard Griffin (1820) Limited.

They were market-leaders in publishing statistical and mathematical books (e.g. Griffin's Statistical Monographs),
