= Battle of Prestonpans =

Battle in Scotland during the Jacobite rising of 1745

Coordinates: 55°57′18″N 02°57′35″W

- Part of the Jacobite rising of 1745
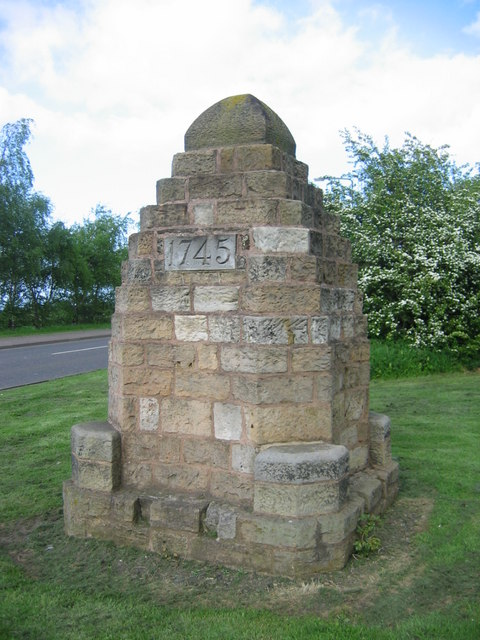
- Cairn erected in memory of the battle
Date	21 September 1745
Location	Prestonpans, Scotland, Great Britain
Result	Jacobite victory

Belligerents
Jacobites	(Kingdom of Great Britain) British Government

Commanders and leaders
Charles Stuart; George Murray; Donald Cameron; John O'Sullivan	John Cope; Thomas Fowke; Peregrine Lascelles; James Gardiner †

Strength
c. 2,400–2,500	c. 2,190 (Note: Murray's Regiment, 580; Lascelles & Guise Regiments, 570; Lee's Regiment, 291; Highlanders, 183; Gardiner & Hamilton dragoons; 567)

Casualties and losses
105–120 killed and wounded	300–500 killed and wounded; 500–600 captured

Registered battlefield
- Designated: 21 March 2011
- Reference no.: BTL16

The Battle of Prestonpans (Note: Also known as the Battle of Gladsmuir), 21 September 1745, took place near Prestonpans, in East Lothian. It was the first significant engagement of the Jacobite rising of 1745.

Jacobite forces, led by the exiled Charles Edward Stuart and George Murray, defeated a British government army under Sir John Cope, whose inexperienced troops broke in the face of a Highland charge. The battle lasted less than thirty minutes, was a huge boost to Jacobite morale, and established the revolt as a serious threat.

== Background ==
The War of the Austrian Succession began in 1740, and by 1745, much of the British Army was based in Flanders. Encouraged by French victory at Fontenoy in April 1745, Charles Edward Stuart sailed for Scotland in July, hoping to take advantage of the situation. On landing at Eriskay in the Outer Hebrides on 23 July, most of those contacted advised him to return to France, but enough were eventually persuaded, notably Donald Cameron of Lochiel, whose tenants provided a large proportion of the Jacobite force. The rebellion was formally launched at Glenfinnan on 19 August.

Sir John Cope, government commander in Scotland, was a competent soldier with between 3,000 and 4,000 troops available, but many were inexperienced recruits. He was hampered by poor intelligence and advice, particularly from the Marquess of Tweeddale, the Secretary of State for Scotland, who consistently underestimated the severity of the revolt. Once Charles's location was confirmed, Cope left his cavalry and artillery at Stirling under Thomas Fowke and marched on Corrieyairack Pass, the primary access point between the Western Highlands and the Lowlands. Control would allow Cope to block the route into Eastern Scotland, but he found the Highlanders already in possession and withdrew to Inverness on 26 August.

Jacobite objectives remained unclear until early September, when Cope learned they were using the military road network to advance on Edinburgh. Concluding that the only way to reach the city first was by sea, his troops were loaded onto ships at Aberdeen. They began disembarking at Dunbar on 17 September but once again he was too late: Charles had entered the Scottish capital earlier that day, although Edinburgh Castle remained in government hands.

== Battle ==
Prestonpans; Cope's army originally faced southward with a marshy area to their front front (marked in blue) and then pivoted to the east, along the Tranent to Cockenzie Waggonway.

Joined at Dunbar by Fowke and the cavalry, Cope was confident that he was strong enough to defeat a poorly armed Jacobite army of fewer than 2,000. At the same time Charles ordered his forces to move eastward from Edinburgh, and the two armies made contact on the afternoon of 20 September. Cope drew up his forces facing south, with a marshy area immediately in front, park walls protecting their right and cannon behind the embankment of the Tranent to Cockenzie Waggonway, which crossed the battlefield.

The court-martial set up in 1746 to review Cope's conduct agreed that the ground was well chosen and that the disposition of his troops was appropriate. However that was undermined by various factors, such as the poor quality of some senior officers, including James Gardiner, whose dragoons fled in panic from a small party of Highlanders in the so-called Coltbridge Canter of 16 September. In addition, much of Cope's infantry lacked experience. Until May Lascelles' Regiment had been employed in building a military road near Loch Lomond. Finally, his borrowed seamen gunners were so poorly trained that he sent a messenger to Edinburgh Castle asking for replacements, who never reached him.

Charles wanted to attack immediately, but Murray argued that their charge would be slowed by the marshy ground in front of Cope's centre, exposing the Highlanders to his superior firepower. Whilst his assessment was correct, it was the first in a series of fierce arguments between them that would fatally undermine the Jacobite leadership. Murray persuaded the majority that only an attack against the open left flank of Cope's army stood any chance of success, and Robert Anderson, a local farmer's son who knew the area well, told him of a route through the marshlands. At 4 am the entire Jacobite force began moving three abreast along the Riggonhead defile, east of Cope's position.

To prevent a surprise attack during the night, Cope kept fires burning in front of his position and posted no fewer than 200 dragoons and 300 infantry as pickets. A company of Loudon's Highlanders, under Macpherson of Cluny, had deserted from Cope a few days before. The remaining three companies were detailed to guard the baggage park in Cockenzie and Port Seton, and some 100 volunteers were dismissed until the next morning and missed the battle. Warned by his pickets of the Jacobite movement, Cope had enough time to wheel his army to face east (see map) and reposition his cannon. As the Highlanders began their charge, his artillerymen fled, leaving the guns to be fired by their officers.

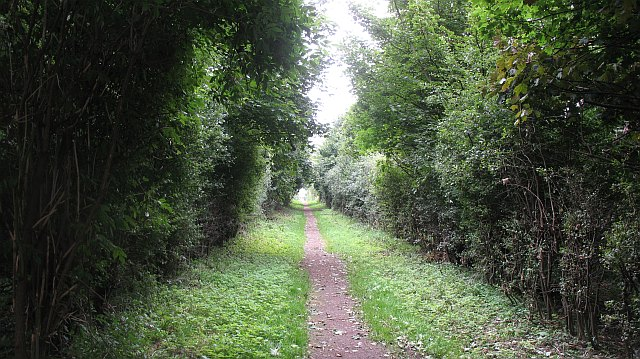
The remains of the Tranent to Cockenzie Waggonway

The two dragoon regiments on the flanks panicked and rode off, leaving Gardiner mortally wounded on the battlefield; he was later carried from the field to Tranent, where he died during the night. Their flight exposed the infantry in the centre, which became attacked on three sides and overrun in less than 15 minutes. With retreat blocked by the park walls behind them, most were taken prisoner, but some escaped when the Highlanders stopped to loot the baggage train. Government losses were roughly 300 to 500 killed or wounded and another 500 to 600 captured, most of whom were released to save the expense of feeding them. Jacobite casualties were estimated as 35 to 40 dead plus 70 to 80 wounded.

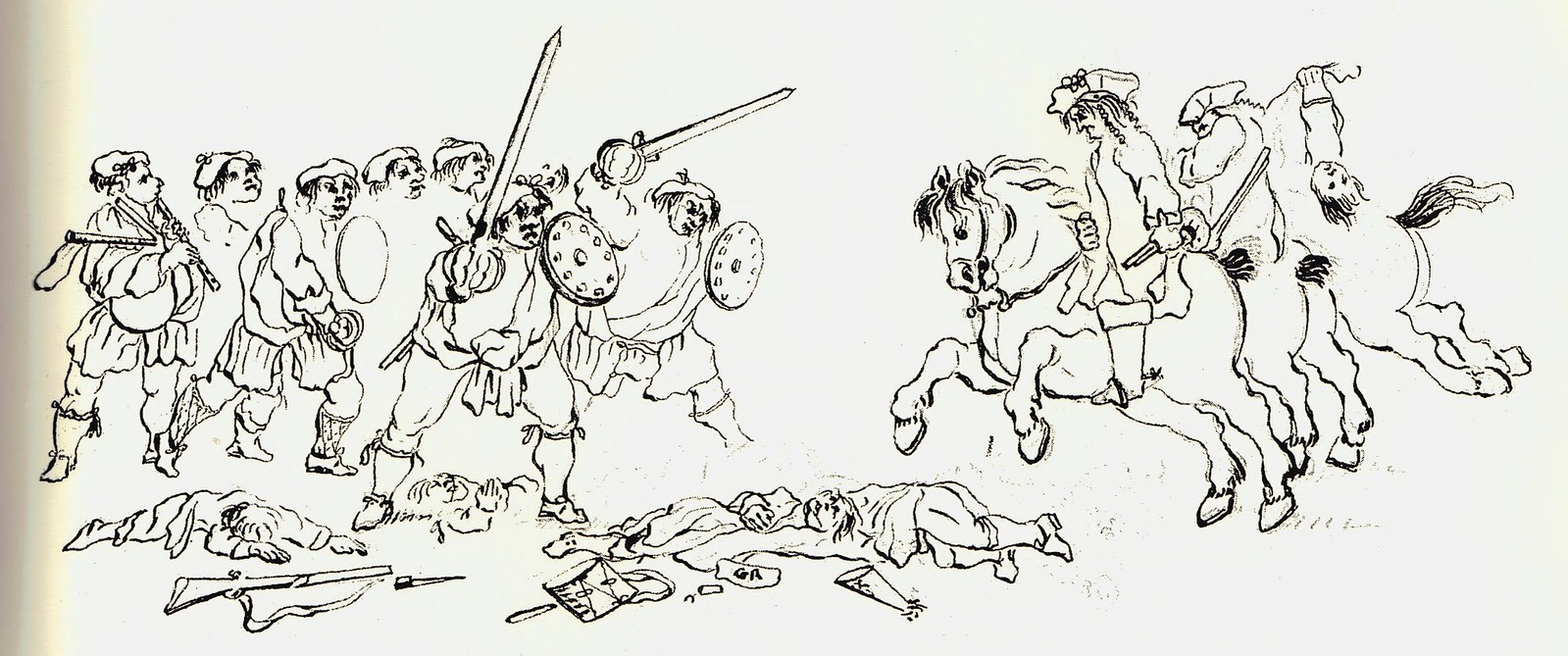
Highland charge during the Battle of Prestonpans (from the Penicuik Drawings 1745–1746)

Deserted by his gunners, the artillery commander, Lieutenant-Colonel Whitefoord, left the battlefield unharmed after his life was spared by Stewart of Invernahyle. He returned the favour by obtaining a pardon for Stewart after he was captured at Culloden in April 1746. Cope escaped along with Fowke and Lascelles, one of the few members of his regiment to do so. They reached Berwick-upon-Tweed the next day with 450 survivors.

== Aftermath ==
Several hours after the battle, Cope wrote to Tweeddale to disclaim responsibility for the defeat: "I cannot reproach myself; the manner in which the enemy came on was quicker than can be described... and the cause of our men taking on a destructive panic". Along with Fowke and Lascelles, he was later tried by a court-martial. All three were exonerated, the Court deciding that defeat had been due to the "shameful conduct of the private soldiers", but Cope never held a senior command again.

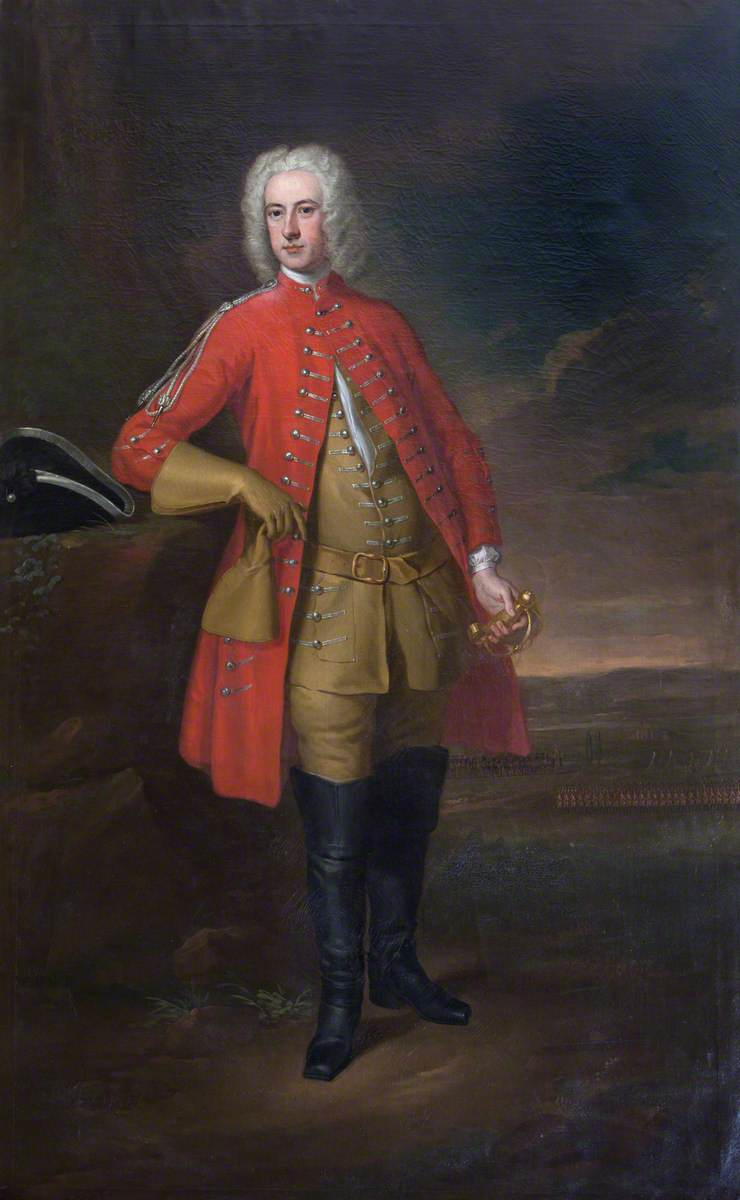
Sir John Cope was cleared by the subsequent court-martial, but Prestonpans ended his career.

The Battle of Killiecrankie (1689) had shown that even experienced troops struggled with the ferocity of the Highland charge, a lesson reinforced at Prestonpans and Falkirk Muir in January 1746. Its weakness was that if the initial charge failed the Highlanders were not equipped to hold their ground. At Culloden in April, Cumberland's troops had been drilled in countering that tactic and inflicted heavy losses on the Scots as a result.

Victory meant the rebellion was now taken more seriously. In mid-October two French ships arrived at Montrose, bringing money, weapons and an envoy, the Marquis d'Eguilles. Cumberland and 12,000 troops were recalled from Flanders, including 6,000 German mercenaries, who arrived in Berwick-upon-Tweed a few days after Cope. They were immediately available, having been captured at Tournai in June and released on condition that they did not fight against the French.

The argument prior to the battle between Prince Charles and Lord Murray was the first episode in an increasingly fractious relationship, and the Jacobite Council spent the next six weeks arguing strategy. Reversing the 1707 Union was a significant factor in Scottish Jacobites' support, which now appeared possible, and they wanted to consolidate their position. Charles and his exile advisers argued the removal of the Hanoverian regime was required to ensure the end of the Union, which meant an invasion of England. The Scots eventually agreed after Charles assured them of substantial English and French support and left Edinburgh on 4 November and entered England on 8 November. Government forces, under General Roger Handasyd, retook Edinburgh on the 14th.

On the march southward the Council met daily to discuss strategy, and at Derby on 5 December its members overwhelmingly counselled retreat, the only significant dissenter being Charles. There was no sign of the promised French landing, and despite the large crowds that turned out to see them only Manchester provided a significant number of recruits. Preston, a Jacobite stronghold in 1715, supplied three. News of another French supply convoy arriving in Montrose seemed to validate the original preference for remaining in Scotland and the Jacobites turned northward the next day. The rising ended with defeat at Culloden in April 1746.

== Legacy ==
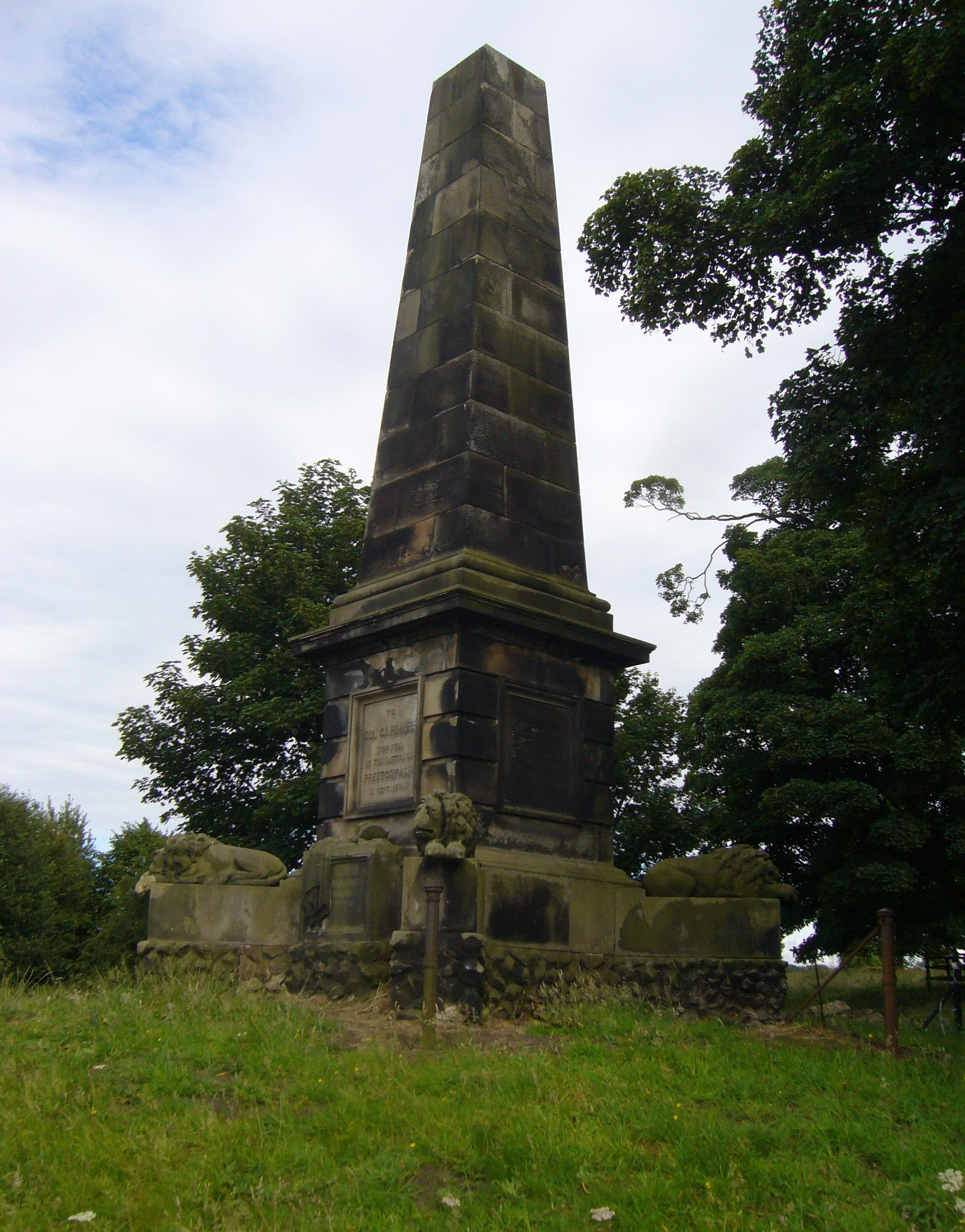
Colonel Gardiner's Monument; his death turned him into a Nonconformist martyr

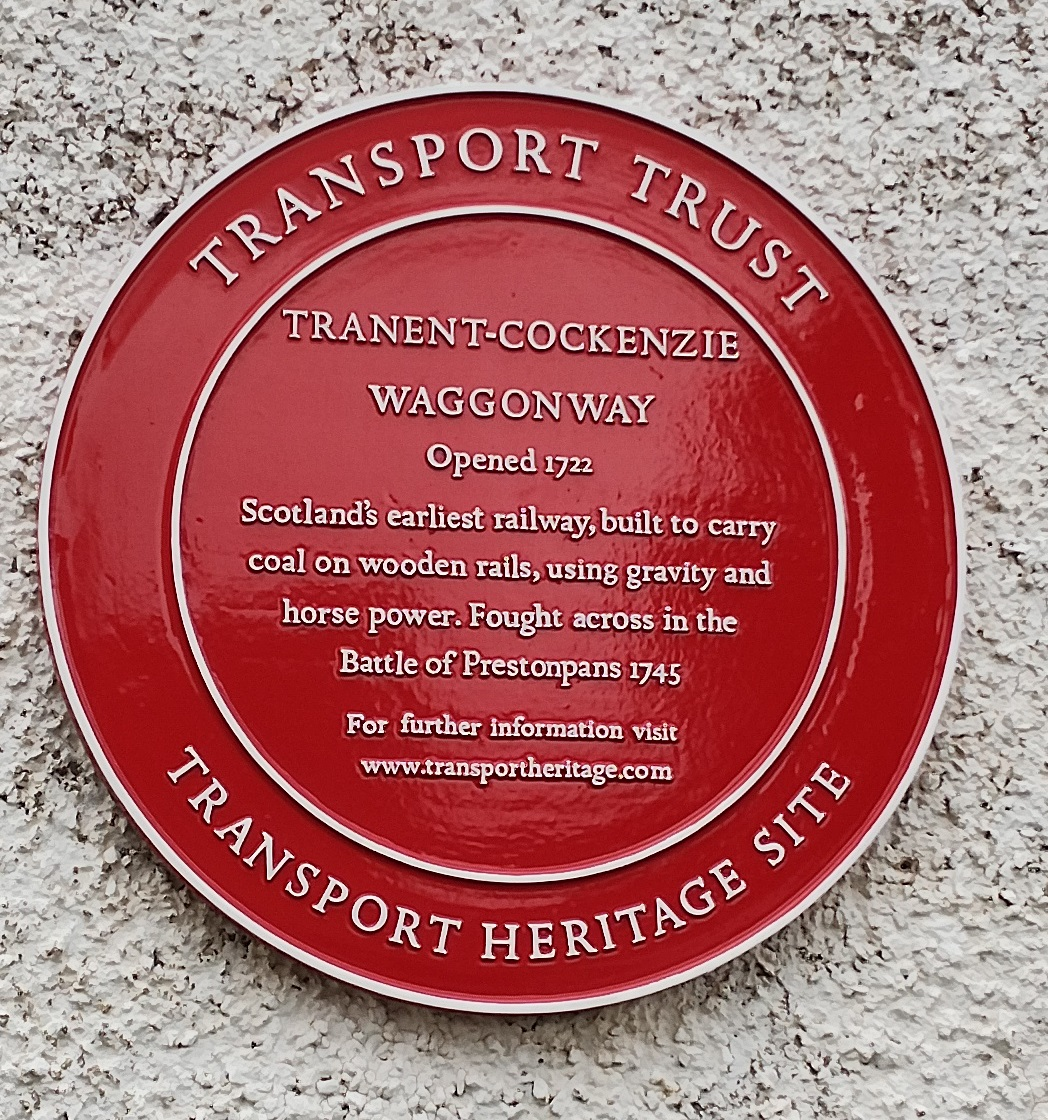
A plaque marking the Tranent to Cockenzie Waggonway, across which the Battle of Prestonpans was fought.

In 1953 a memorial to the dead of both sides was erected near the battle site, with a coal bing providing a vantage point for visitors. The Prestonpans 1745 Heritage Trust was established in 2006 to provide information on the battle, and the site is included in the Inventory of Historic Battlefields in Scotland and protected by Historic Scotland. In 2019 a new visitor centre was proposed, which would permanently house the Prestonpans Tapestry, a depiction of the events leading up to the battle. The site has been partly developed for housing and the former Cockenzie power station.

Popular perception of the battle and Cope's role has largely been set by accounts by third parties, none of whom was present and in one case had not yet been born. In his 1747 book Life of Colonel Gardiner, the Nonconformist minister Philip Doddridge portrayed Gardiner, a convert to evangelicalism, as a hero and did so largely by ridiculing Cope. That is an enduring myth and is still recycled today. Gardiner features in Sir Walter Scott's 1817 novel Waverley, the hero of which is an English Jacobite. Gardiner's heroic death convinces him that the future lies with the Union rather than with the Stuarts. An obelisk in his memory was set up in the mid-19th century.

Scott was also responsible for the often-quoted but inaccurate comment attributed to Lord Mark Kerr that Cope was the first general to bring news of his own defeat. Perhaps the best-known legacy of the battle is two songs written by Adam Skirving, a local farmer who visited the battlefield later the same day and was, by his own account, mugged by the victors. They were Tranent Muir and the far more famous Hey, Johnnie Cope, Are Ye Waking Yet?, a short, catchy and mostly historically inaccurate insult to Cope; the poet Robert Burns wrote his own words for the song, but they are not as well known as the original by Skirving. The tune is still played by some Scottish regiments for Reveille and was also played as the 51st (Highland) Division disembarked on Juno Beach in Normandy on 6 June 1944.

Participants in the battle included Allan Breac Stewart, a soldier in Lee's Regiment, who switched sides after being taken prisoner and served in the Jacobite Stewart of Appin's regiment. The author Robert Louis Stevenson used him as a lead character in his 1886 novel Kidnapped. The battle forms part of Season 2, Episode 10, of the historical drama television series Outlander.

== Sources ==
- Anand, A McK (1960). "Stewart of Appin's Regiment in the army of Prince Charles". Journal of the Society for Army Historical Research. 38 (153). JSTOR 44222359.
- Blaikie, Walter Biggar, ed. (March 1916). Publications of the Scottish History Society, 1737–1746. Vol. Ser. 2, Vol. 2. Scottish History Society.
- Cadell, Sir Robert (1898). Sir John Cope and the Rebellion of 1745. William Blackwood & Sons.
- Charles, George (1817). History of the transactions in Scotland, in the years 1715–16 & 1745–1746; Volume II. Gilchrist & Heriot.
- Corsar, Kenneth Charles (1941). "The Canter of Coltbridge; 16th September 1745". Journal of the Society for Army Historical Research. 20 (78): 93–94. JSTOR 44228252.
- Duffy, Christopher (2003). The '45: Bonnie Prince Charlie and the untold story of the Jacobite Rising. Orion. ISBN 978-0304355259.
- Lord Elcho, David (1907). Charteris, Edward Evan (ed.). A short account of the affairs of Scotland: in the years 1744, 1745, 1746. David Douglas.
- Margulies, Martin (2013). Battle of Prestonpans 1745 (second ed.). Battle of Prestonpans Heritage Trust.
- Pittock, Murray (1998). Jacobitism. Palgrave Macmillan. ISBN 978-0333667989.;
- Reid, Stuart (1996). British Redcoat 1740–93. Osprey Publishing. ISBN 978-1855325548.;
- Riding, Jacqueline (2016). Jacobites; A New History of the 45 Rebellion. Bloomsbury. ISBN 978-1408819128.
- Royle, Trevor (2016). Culloden; Scotland's Last Battle and the Forging of the British Empire. Little, Brown and Company. ISBN 978-1408704011.
- Smiles, Samuel (1859). The Life of George Stephenson, Railway Engineer (4th ed.). Boston, MA: Ticknor and Fields.
- Sroka, Kenneth M. (January 1980). "Education in Walter Scott's Waverley". Studies in Scottish Literature. 15 (1): 139–162. eISSN 0039-3770.
- Tomasson, Katherine; Buist, Francis (1978). Battles of the Forty-five. HarperCollins Distribution Services. ISBN 978-0713407693.;
