= Cobham Park (cricket ground) =

Former cricket venue

- Interactive map of Cobham Park
- Location: Cobham, Kent
- Coordinates: 51.394°N 0.418°E
- Establishment: 1792
- Last used: 1879

Cobham Park near Cobham, Kent and located within the grounds of the Cobham Hall estate, was used a cricket ground. It was used as the venue for an inter-county match between Kent and Hampshire.

The ground was used for cricket matches by Cobham Cricket Club between the 1850s and 1870s, including a number of matches against the Royal Engineers Cricket Club. The Hall was owned by the Earls of Darnley and a number of the family were keen cricketers. Ivo Bligh, who became the 8th Earl in 1900, captained the English tour of Australia in 1882–83, recapturing The Ashes.

The hall was last used for cricket in 1951.
