= Cobham Park =

Country estate in Surrey, England

Coordinates: 51°19′16.32″N 0°24′35.10″W

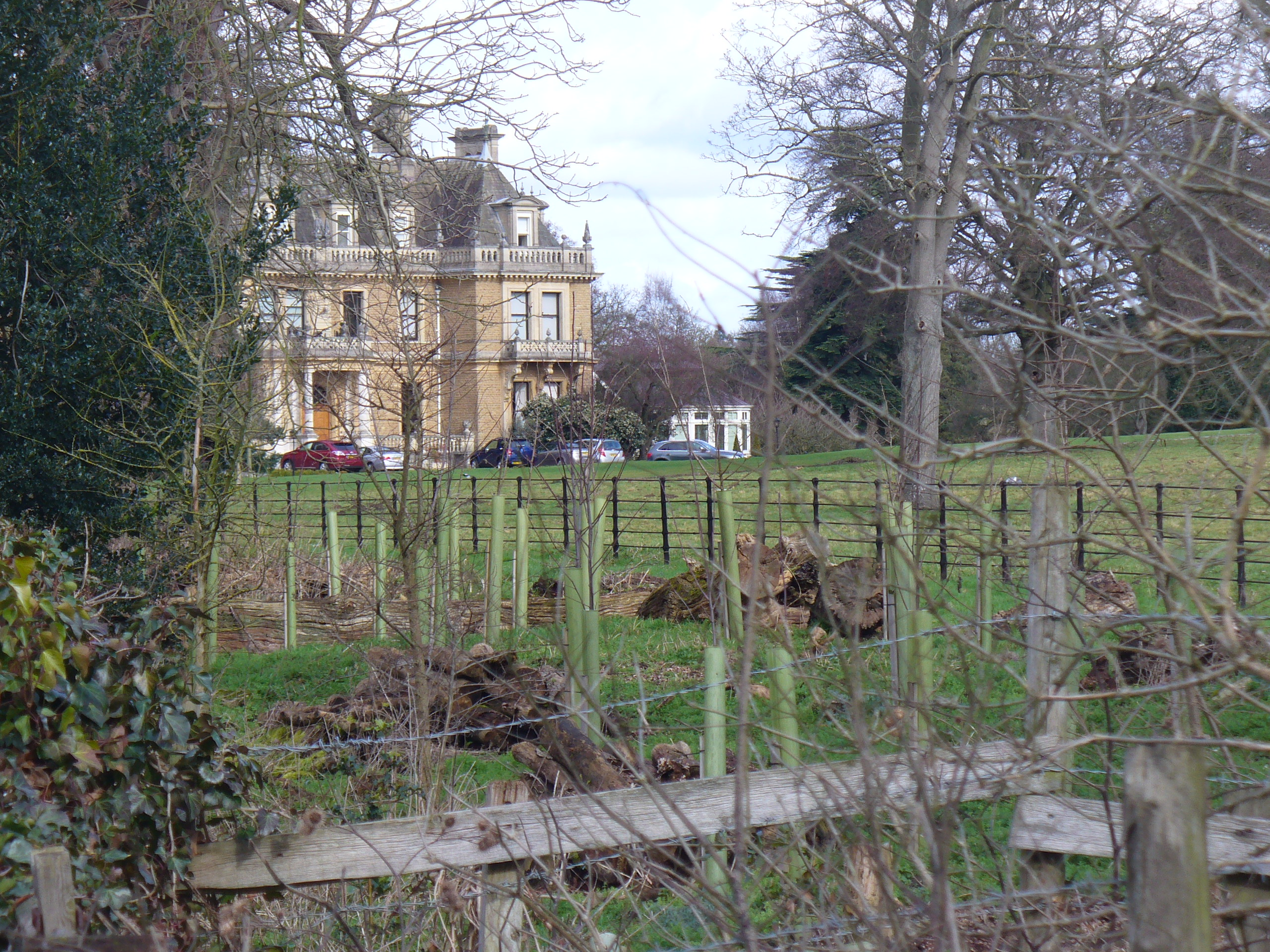
Mansion in Cobham Park

Cobham Park is a former mansion and country estate in Cobham, Surrey, England. The main house was converted to apartments in the early 2000s, but the majority of the surrounding former parkland remains undeveloped. At its height in the 19th century, the estate included the majority of the neighbouring settlement of downside Downside.

The first records of the land are from the 15th century and it is referred to as "Dounefelde" in a charter of Chertsey Abbey dated 1468. The first large house to be built at Cobham Park was constructed in the 1720s. The current building dates from the early 1870s and was designed by Edward Middleton Barry.

== Location ==
Cobham Park is a former parkland and mansion between the villages of Cobham and Downside in Surrey. The land is on a terrace of sand and gravel above the adjacent River Mole. Major flooding events are recorded at Cobham Park in 1847 and 1900.

== History ==
=== Downe Place ===
Although there is some evidence to indicate that the part of the land now forming Cobham Park was a high-status Anglo-Saxon site, the earliest indications of settlement, identified with Downside, date from the 12th century. There are records of royal patronage from the late-13th century. In 1468, a charter of Chertsey Abbey leased the land, then known as "Dounefelde", to Robert Bardsley, a prominent resident of Kingston upon Thames. The land remained in the Bardsley family until 1522, when Peter Bardsley transferred the property to the bishop of Winchester.

Downe Place was the home of the Downe (or Adowne) family for many generations, with heriots to Chertsey Abbey. H.E. Malden followed E.W. Brayley in deriving the locality name "Downside" from the family, but T.E.C. Walker more credibly derived the family's name from the location, referring to the hill or down near the river on that side of Cobham. That house was later also known as "Downe Hall". As Walker clarified, the direct connection of Downe Place and its estates with the Downe family ceased in 1720 when they were sold by the heirs of Jane Smither (née Downe), sister of John Downe of Cobham (died 1656), to Frances, Lady Lanesborough, daughter of Richard Sackville and widow of George Lane, 1st Viscount Lanesborough. Lady Lanesborough had purchased the manor of Cobham from the Gavell family in 1708. Brayley writes of Cobham Park (i.e., the mansion) as having formerly been called Downe Place, but the historian David Taylor shows that the old Downe Place probably stood near Downside Farm, and not on the site of the Cobham Park mansion.

=== Cobham Park ===
A new house known as Cobham Park was built in the classical style in the 1720s by John Bridges. The design was based on an Italian villa of the 1680s. A description in Daniel Defoe's A Tour Through The Whole Island of Great Britain reads "... for the size of this House, there is hardly any other near London, which has more useful and elegant Apartments". In the 1840s it remained, according to historian Brayley, "a handsome and substantial building, nearly of a square form, and has a neat portico, which was erected some years ago in place of a veranda. It includes a good saloon with a coved and ornamented ceiling, (now a billiard room), a library, and other convenient apartments, embellished with a few marble busts, and some good pictures."

In around 1750, John Ligonier, 1st Earl Ligonier occupied and bought Cobham Park and entertained William Pitt the Elder at a party soon afterwards. Ligonier appears to have used Cobham Park as a place of retreat and leisure (apparently he had a harem of four young women). The house passed to a nephew Edward, who expanded the estate following the enclosure of the common fields of Cobham in 1779. He died childless in 1782, but Cobham Park remained under the control of his trustees. They added further land to the estate following the enclosure of the local common land in 1793.

In 1801, Cobham Park was purchased by Henry Luttrell, 2nd Earl of Carhampton, but he only lived in the mansion for three years before moving to Painshill. In 1806, he sold it to Harvey Christian Combe, a brewer, for £30,000 (equivalent to £3,100,000 in 2023). Combe commissioned John Buonarotti Papworth to make alterations to the house. His son, Harvey Combe Jr, inherited the estate in 1818 and began the process of landscaping the grounds. He demolished the workers cottages close to the mansion and moved the occupants to new purpose-built houses at Downside. Harvey Combe Jr died in 1857 and was succeeded by his nephew, Charles.

Charles Combe expanded the estate with the purchase of Downside Mill in 1866 and land formerly belonging to Ham Manor in 1872. He commissioned a new house to be built on the same foundations as the mansion. It was designed by Edward Middleton Barry and was completed in 1873. Pevsner does not appear to have liked the new house, describing it as "very ugly French Renaissance". The new mansion was one of the first houses in country to have its own electricity supply, which was fed from a generator at Downside Mill. Charles Combe also founded the Cobham Stud Company and was a promoter of the railway line serving Cobham.

The Combe family left the house in the 1930s — Charles Combe moved to Painshill in 1904. Later, family members moved into other houses on the estate, notably Cobham Court, Cossins House and Cobham Lodge.

During the Second World War, Cobham Park was leased by Eagle Star Insurance group, which later became part of Zurich Financial Services. In the 1960s and 1970s, various companies leased parts of the mansion house as office/conference facilities, in a creaking state of repair. In 1979 Logica leased the house and outbuildings and began a restoration project that year. In 1987, the company purchased Cobham Park from the Combe family for £2M.

Logica sold the house for £5.5 million in 2001 to Frogmore Estates, which sold it to Beechcroft (then a subsidiary of John Laing plc) the following year. Beechcroft converted the house and outbuildings, and built new apartments on the site, to make a total of around 21 luxury houses and apartments.

== Bibliography ==
- Taylor, David C. (2003b). Cobham: A history. Chichester: Philimore. ISBN 978-1-86-077247-4.
- Taylor, David C. (2006). An estate for all seasons : A history of Cobham Park, Surrey and its owners and occupiers. Chichester: Philimore. ISBN 978-1-86-077431-7.
- Walker, T.E.C. (1961). "Cobham: Manorial History" (PDF). Surrey Archaeological Collections. 58: 47–78. doi:10.5284/1068915.
