= John Ligonier, 1st Earl Ligonier =

British army officer and politician (1680–1770)

Field Marshal The Right Honourable The Earl Ligonier KB PC
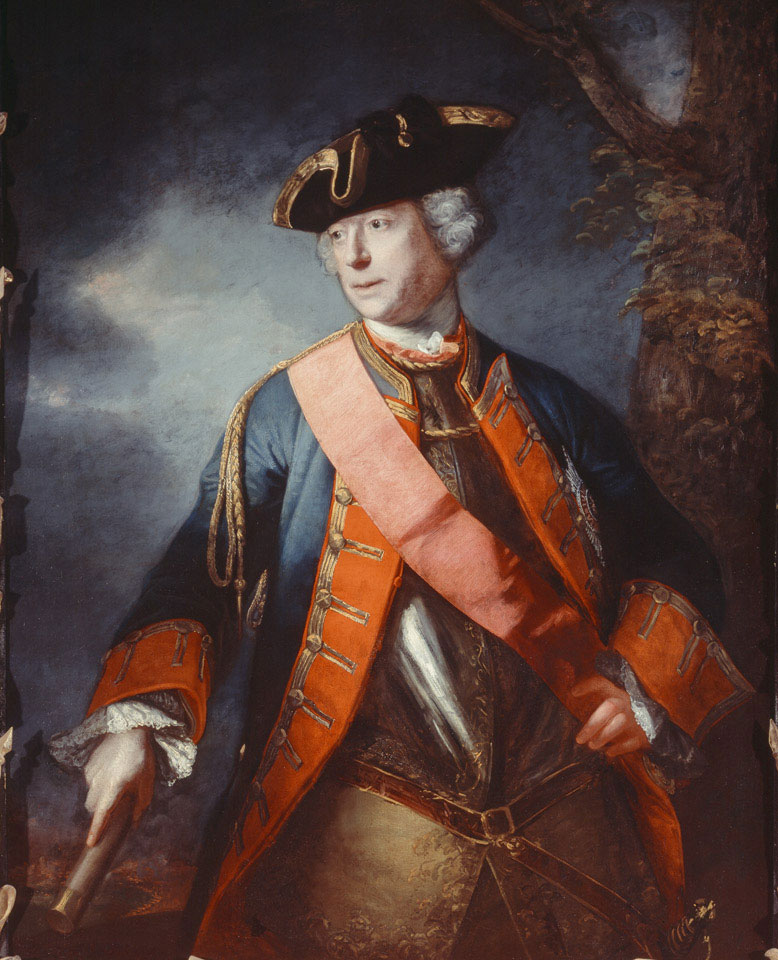
- Portrait by Sir Joshua Reynolds, c. 1755

Master-General of the Ordnance
- In office 1759–1763

Commander-in-Chief of the Forces
- In office 1757–1759

Military Governor of Plymouth
- In office 1752–1759

Governor of Guernsey
- In office 1750–1752

Member of Parliament for Bath
- In office 1748–1763

Personal details
- Born: Jean Louis de Ligonnier; 7 November 1680 Castres, France
- Died: 28 April 1770 (aged 89) North Audley Street, London
- Resting place: St Andrews, Cobham, Surrey
- Relations: Francis Ligonier (1693–1746)
- Awards: Knight of the Bath

Military service
- Allegiance: England; Great Britain
- Branch/service: English Army; British Army
- Years of service: 1702–1759
- Rank: Field marshal
- Unit: 7th Dragoon Guards; 1st Regiment of Foot Guards
- Battles/wars: War of the Spanish Succession; Capture of Liège; Battle of Schellenberg; Battle of Blenheim; Battle of Ramillies; Siege of Menin; Battle of Oudenarde; Battle of Malplaquet; War of the Quadruple Alliance; Capture of Vigo; War of the Austrian Succession; Battle of Dettingen; Battle of Fontenoy; Battle of Rocoux; Battle of Lauffeld; Seven Years' War

Field Marshal John Ligonier, 1st Earl Ligonier, KB, PC (born Jean Louis de Ligonnier; 7 November 1680 – 28 April 1770), styled Sir John Ligonier from 1743 to 1757, was a British army officer and politician who served in the English and British armies for more than half a century. In 1757, he was appointed Commander-in-chief and raised to the peerage as Viscount Ligonier in 1757, and in 1766, further elevated as Earl Ligonier.

Ligonier was a Huguenot refugee who fled his native Castres for England in 1697, following the 1685 Edict of Fontainebleau, which stripped the rights of French Protestants to practice their religion. He joined the British Army in 1702 as a volunteer and remained dedicated to the British cause for the next six decades. He fought in the European wars of the Spanish Succession, of the Quadruple Alliance, and of the Austrian Succession. During the Seven Years' War, he also served as Master-General of the Ordnance, effectively acting as Minister of War for the Pitt–Newcastle ministry. He retired from active duty in 1763 and died at his home in London on 28 April 1770.

He sat in the House of Commons of Great Britain for Bath from 1748 to 1763 and served as Governor of Guernsey from 1750 to 1752.

== Early life and family ==
John Ligonier was born Jean-Louis de Ligonnier in Castres, Languedoc, the second son of Louis de Ligonnier, sieur de Montcuquet, and Louise de Ligonnier, daughter of Louis du Poncet. His parents were married on 28 March 1677 at Roquecourbe. His grandfather built the family's hôtel particulier, Hôtel Poncet, in Castres. Louis de Ligonnier died around 1690. John, a Huguenot, was educated in France and Switzerland. In 1697, he became the first of Louis' three younger sons who left for England, where they altered their name to Ligonier.

His younger brother Antoine de Ligonnier followed in 1698. He served in several of the Duke of Marlborough's campaigns during the War of the Spanish Succession and died unmarried in 1767, with the rank of major. His youngest brother , François-Auguste de Ligonnier, emigrated in 1710.

Their eldest brother, Abel de Ligonnier (1669-1769), inherited his father's estates and stayed in Castres. He married Louise de Boileau, daughter of Jacques de Boileau de Castelnau, sister of Huguenot refugee Charles Boileau, the progenitor of the Boileau family in Britain, many of whom served in the British Army. Abel was recorded living in France as late as 1769.

== Military career ==
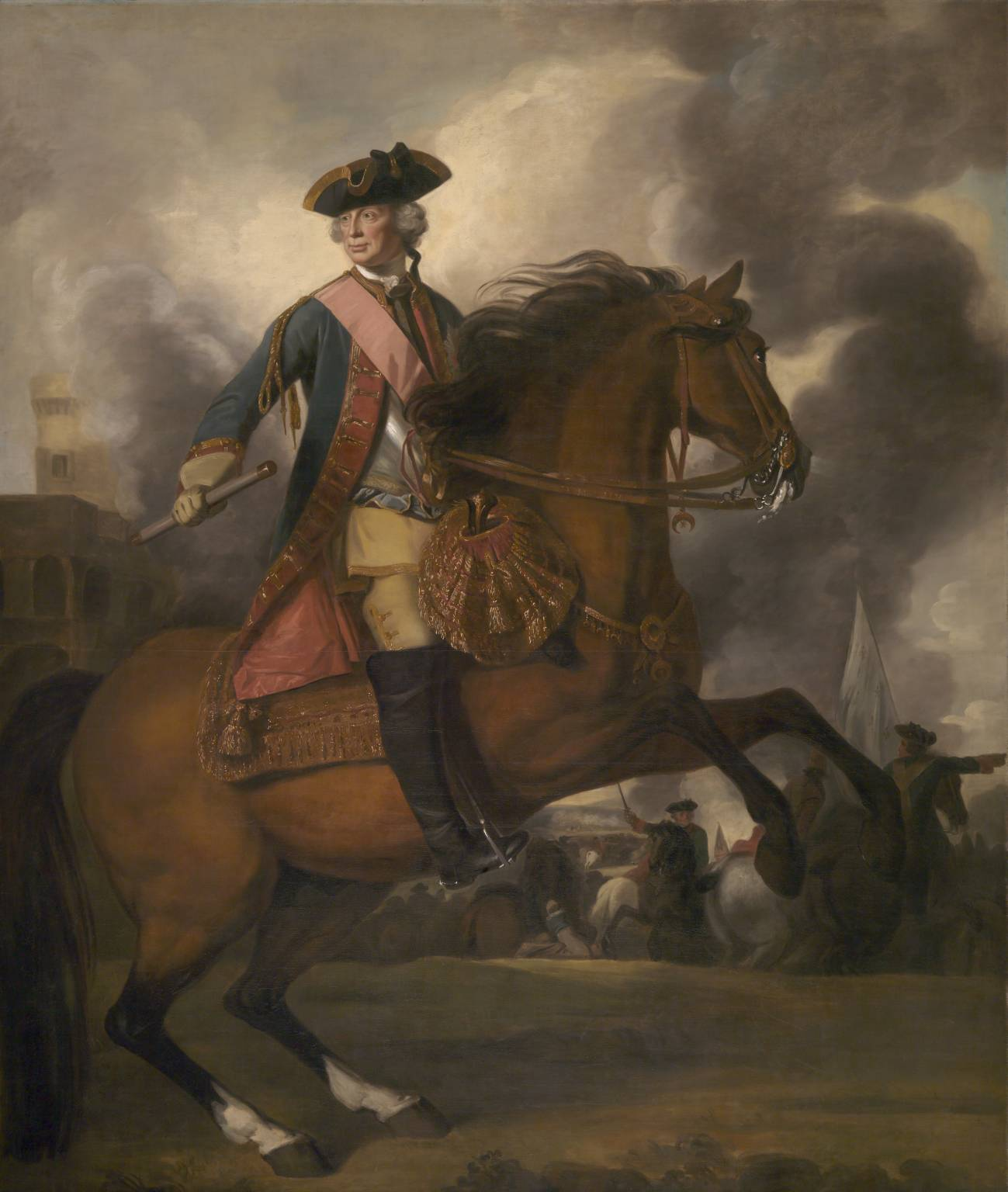
1760 portrait of Ligonier by Sir Joshua Reynolds

In 1702, Ligonier volunteered to join a regiment in Flanders commanded by Lord Cutts. He fought, with distinction, in the War of the Spanish Succession and was one of the first to mount the breach at the capture of Liège in October 1702. After becoming a captain in the 10th Foot on 10 February 1703, he commanded a company at the battles of Schellenberg in July 1704 and Blenheim in August 1704, and was present at Menen where he led the storming of the covered way as well as Ramillies in May 1706, Oudenarde in July 1708 and Malplaquet in September 1709 where he received twenty-three bullets through his clothing yet remained unhurt. In 1712, he became governor of Fort St. Philip, Menorca. During the War of the Quadruple Alliance in 1719, he was adjutant-general of the troops employed in the Vigo expedition, where he led the stormers of Pontevedra.

Two years later, he became colonel of the Black Horse. He was made a brigadier general in 1735, major general in 1739, and accompanied Lord Stair in the Rhine Campaign of 1742 to 1743. He was promoted to lieutenant general on 26 February 1742 and George II made him a Knight of the Bath on the field of Dettingen in June 1743. At Fontenoy in May 1745, Ligonier commanded the British, Hanoverian, and Hessian infantry.

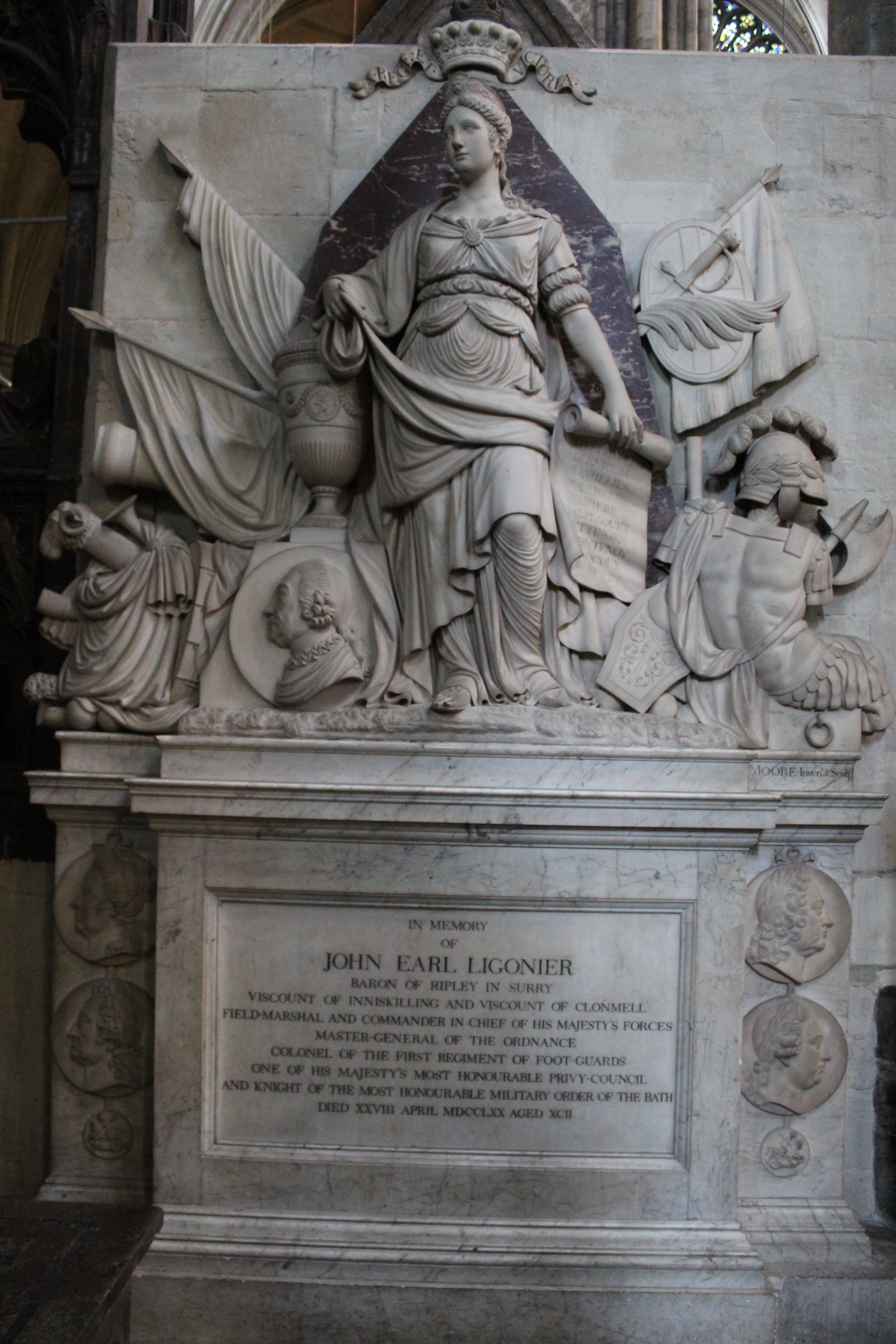
Monument to Ligonier by John Francis Moore at Westminster Abbey

During the Jacobite rising of 1745, he was called home to command British troops in the English Midlands. In November 1745, he led a column of troops sent to Lancashire to oppose the rebels. Having been promoted to the rank of general of horse on 3 January 1746, he was placed at the head of the British and British-paid contingents of the Allied army in the Low Countries in June 1746.

He was present at Rocoux in October 1746 and, having been made Lieutenant-General of the Ordnance on 19 March 1747, he fought at Lauffeld in July 1747, where he led the charge of the British cavalry. He did this with such vigour that he overthrew the whole line of French cavalry. In this encounter his horse was killed and he was taken prisoner by Louis XV, but was exchanged within a few days. The official despatch reported:

it is impossible to commend too much the conduct of the generals both horse and foot. Sir John Legonier, who charged at the head of the British dragoons with that skill and spirit that he has shown on so many occasions, and in which he was so well seconded...

He became Member of Parliament for Bath in March 1748 and was appointed colonel of the 2nd Dragoon Guards in 1749. From 1748 to 1770, he also served as governor of the French Hospital.

On 6 April 1750 he was appointed Governor of Guernsey and on 3 February 1753 he became colonel of the Royal Horse Guards.

== Seven Years' War ==
In September 1757, following the disgrace of the Duke of Cumberland who had signed the Convention of Klosterzeven, Ligonier was made Commander-in-Chief of the Forces. He worked closely with the Pitt–Newcastle ministry who sought his strategic advice in connection with the Seven Years' War which was underway at this time. Ligonier was promoted to field marshal and made colonel of the 1st Regiment of Foot Guards on 3 December 1757 and elevated to the Irish peerage on 10 December 1757 as Viscount Ligonier of Enniskillen. He was notionally given command of British forces in the event of a planned French invasion in 1759 though it never ultimately occurred. He stood down as commander-in-chief in 1759 and became Master-General of the Ordnance. He was given a further Irish peerage on 1 May 1762 as Viscount Ligonier of Clonmell (with remainder to his nephew) and on 19 April 1763 he became a Baron, and on 6 September 1766 an Earl, in the British peerage.

Fort Ligonier, operating from 1758 to 1766, became the permanent settlement of Ligonier, Pennsylvania and lent its name to Ligonier Valley and Ligonier Valley Railroad. After extensive excavations, Fort Ligonier was reconstructed in 1954 and was added to the National Register of Historic Places.

== Retirement ==
Ligonier spent his later years at Cobham Park in Cobham, Surrey, which he bought around 1750. He died, still unmarried, on 28 April 1770 and was buried in Cobham Church. There is a monument to him, sculpted by John Francis Moore in Westminster Abbey.

The earldom became extinct but the Irish viscountcy and Cobham Park passed to his nephew Edward (son of his younger brother Francis), who would also be created Earl Ligonier in the Peerage of Ireland six years later.

== Sources ==
- Albemarle, George (2009). Fifty Years of My Life. BiblioBazaar. ISBN 978-1-103-47382-3.
- Browne, James (1838). A history of the Highlands and of the Highland clans, Volume 4. A. Fullarton & Co.
- Chichester, Henry Manners. "Ligonier, John" . Dictionary of National Biography. Vol. 33. pp. 240–243.
- Clarke (2010). The Georgian Era: Military and Naval Commanders. Judges and Barristers. Physicians and Surgeons. BiblioBazaar. ISBN 978-1-143-36646-8.
- Combes, Émile (1866). J. L. Ligonier, une étude. Castres.
- Guy, Alan (1985). Oeconomy and discipline: officership and administration in the British army, 1714-1763. Manchester University Press.
- Heathcote, Tony (1999). The British Field Marshals 1736–1997. Pen & Sword Books Ltd. ISBN 0-85052-696-5.
- Kimber, Edward (1771). The new peerage, or, present state of the nobility of England, Scotland and Ireland, Volume 1.
- Mayo, Lawrence Shaw (1916). Jeffrey Amherst: A Biography. London.
- Murdoch, Tessa; Vigne, Randolph (2009). The French Hospital in England: Its Huguenot History and Collections. Cambridge: John Adamson. ISBN 978-0-9524322-7-2.
- Pilkington, Laetitia (1997). Memoirs of Laetitia Pilkington, Volume 1. University of Georgia Press. ISBN 978-0-8203-1719-9.
- Rabaud, Camille (1893). Jean-Louis de Ligonier, généralisme des armées anglaises. Dole.
- Walpole, Horace (1822). Memoires of the last ten years of the reign of George the Second, Volume 2. J. Murray. ISBN 978-1-151-57118-2.
- Whitworth, Rex (1958). Field Marshal Lord Ligonier: A Story of the British Army, 1702-1770. Oxford.

Parliament of Great Britain
Preceded by George Wade; Robert Henley	Member of Parliament for Bath; 1748–1763; With: Robert Henley 1748–1757; William Pitt 1757–1763	Succeeded by William Pitt; Sir John Sebright
Military offices
Preceded by Charles Sybourg	Colonel of Sir John Ligonier's Regiment of Horse (Black Horse); 1720–1749	Succeeded by John Mordaunt
Preceded by George Wade	Lieutenant-General of the Ordnance; 1748–1757	Succeeded by Lord George Sackville
Preceded by The Duke of Montagu	Colonel of The Queen's Regiment of Dragoon Guards; 1749–1753	Succeeded by William Herbert
Preceded by The Duke of Somerset	Governor of Guernsey; 1750–1752	Succeeded by The Lord De La Warr
Preceded by The Earl of Dunmore	Governor of Plymouth; 1752–1759	Succeeded by Richard Onslow
Vacant Title last held by The Duke of Richmond	Colonel of the Royal Horse Guards Blue; 1753–1758	Succeeded by Marquess of Granby
Preceded by The Duke of Cumberland	Commander-in-Chief of the Forces; 1757–1759	Vacant Title next held by Marquess of Granby
Preceded by The Duke of Cumberland	Colonel of the 1st Regiment of Foot Guards; 1757–1770	Succeeded by The Duke of Gloucester and Edinburgh
Preceded by Vacant	Master-General of the Ordnance; 1759–1763	Succeeded by Marquess of Granby
Peerage of Great Britain
New creation	Earl Ligonier; 1766–1770	Extinct
New creation	Baron Ligonier; 1763–1770	Extinct
Peerage of Ireland
New creation	Viscount Ligonier; 1757–1770	Extinct
New creation	Viscount Ligonier; 1762–1770	Succeeded by Edward Ligonier
