= Governor Caulfield =

Governor Caulfield may refer to:

- Henry S. Caulfield, 37th Governor of Missouri from 1929 to 1933
- Thomas Caulfeild (lieutenant governor) (sometimes spelled Caulfield; 1685–1717), British Lieutenant-Governor of Nova Scotia, and frequently acting governor
- William Caulfield, Deputy Governor of Fort George, subsidiary to the Governor of Inverness, c. 1747
