= 8th Regiment of Horse =

8th Regiment of Horse or 8th Horse may refer to:

- Carabiniers (6th Dragoon Guards), ranked as 8th Horse from 1685 to 1694
- 7th Dragoon Guards, ranked as 8th Horse from 1694 to 1746
