= George Wade =

British army officer and politician (1673–1748)

Field Marshal The Right Honourable George Wade
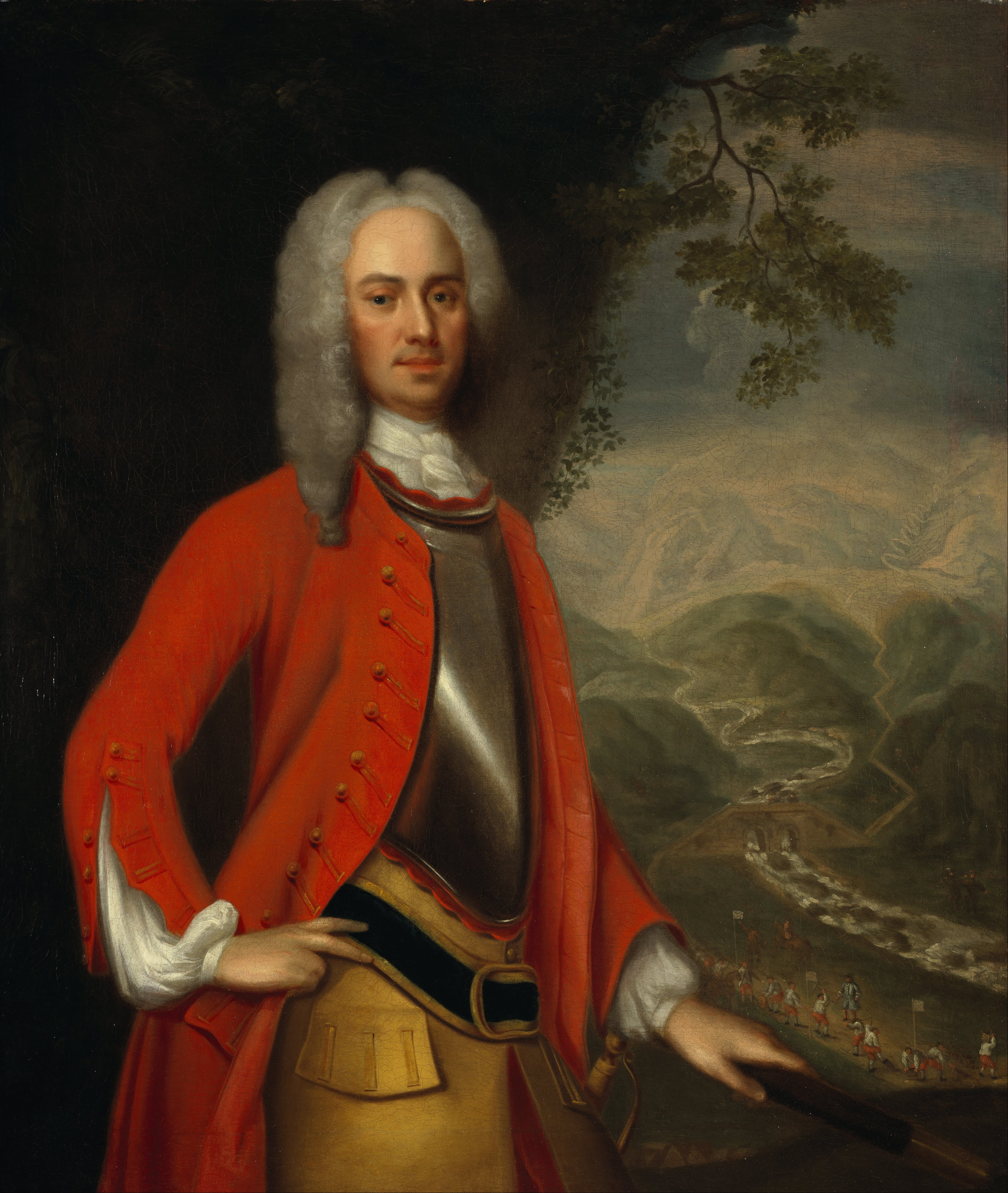
- Portrait attributed to Johan van Diest, 1731
- Born: 1673; Killavally, County Westmeath
- Died: 14 March 1748
- Military career
- Allegiance: England; Great Britain
- Branch: English Army; British Army
- Service years: 1690–1748
- Rank: Field marshal
- Conflicts: Nine Years' War; War of the Spanish Succession; Jacobite rising of 1715; War of the Quadruple Alliance; War of the Austrian Succession; Jacobite rising of 1745

Signature
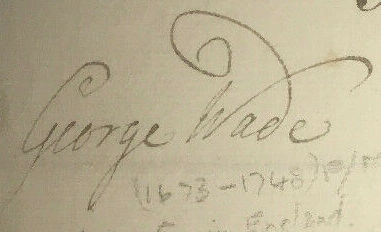

Field Marshal George Wade (1673 – 14 March 1748) was a British army officer and politician who served in the Nine Years' War, War of the Spanish Succession, Jacobite rising of 1715 and War of the Quadruple Alliance. He went on to be a military commander during the War of the Austrian Succession and Commander-in-Chief of the Forces during the Jacobite rising of 1745. While commanding the British Crown forces in Scotland, Wade was responsible for constructing hundreds of miles of military roads, many of which remain in use.

== Early career ==
Born the son of Jerome Wade in Killavally, County Westmeath, Ireland, he spent his early years in English Tangier, where his father was a member of the Tangier Garrison. Wade was commissioned into the Earl of Bath's Regiment on 26 December 1690 and served in Flanders in 1692, fighting at the Battle of Steenkerque in August 1692 during the Nine Years' War and earning a promotion to lieutenant on 10 February 1693. He transferred to Sir Bevil Granville's Regiment on 19 April 1694 and was promoted to captain on 13 June 1695.

During the War of the Spanish Succession, he first served under Marlborough, seeing action in Flanders at the Siege of Kaiserwerth in April 1702, the Siege of Venlo in September 1702, the Siege of Roermond in October 1702 and the Capture of Liège also in October 1702. He was promoted to major on 20 March 1703 and to lieutenant colonel in October 1703. In 1704 he joined the staff of Henri de Massue, Earl of Galway as adjutant-general in Portugal, and distinguished himself as colonel of the Huntingdon's Regiment during the Battle of Alcántara, where he was wounded in April 1706. He repelled a large force of cavalry at Vila Nova and then commanded the 3rd infantry brigade during the Battle of Almansa in April 1707. He was promoted to brigadier general on 1 January 1708.

He served as second in command to James Stanhope in Menorca in 1708, leading one of the storming parties on Fort St. Philip, before returning to Spain in 1710, where he fought at the Battle of Saragossa in August 1710. He was promoted to major-general on 3 October 1714 and became commander of the British forces in Ireland in November 1714.

Wade returned home to join in the suppression of the Jacobite rising of 1715 and undertook security duties in Bath, where he unearthed a haul of Jacobite weapons. He entered politics as MP for Hindon in 1715. On 19 March 1717, he became colonel of the Earl of Plymouth's Regiment of Horse.

In 1719, he served as second-in-command to Viscount Cobham during the War of the Quadruple Alliance when Cobham led a force of 4,000 troops on a raid on the Spanish coastline which captured Vigo and occupied it for ten days before withdrawing. The same year he was one of the original backers of the Royal Academy of Music, establishing a London opera company that commissioned numerous works from Handel and others.

He became MP for Bath in 1722, retaining the seat for 25 years. His house, built around 1700, is situated next to Bath Abbey and is now a Grade I listed building.

== Scotland ==
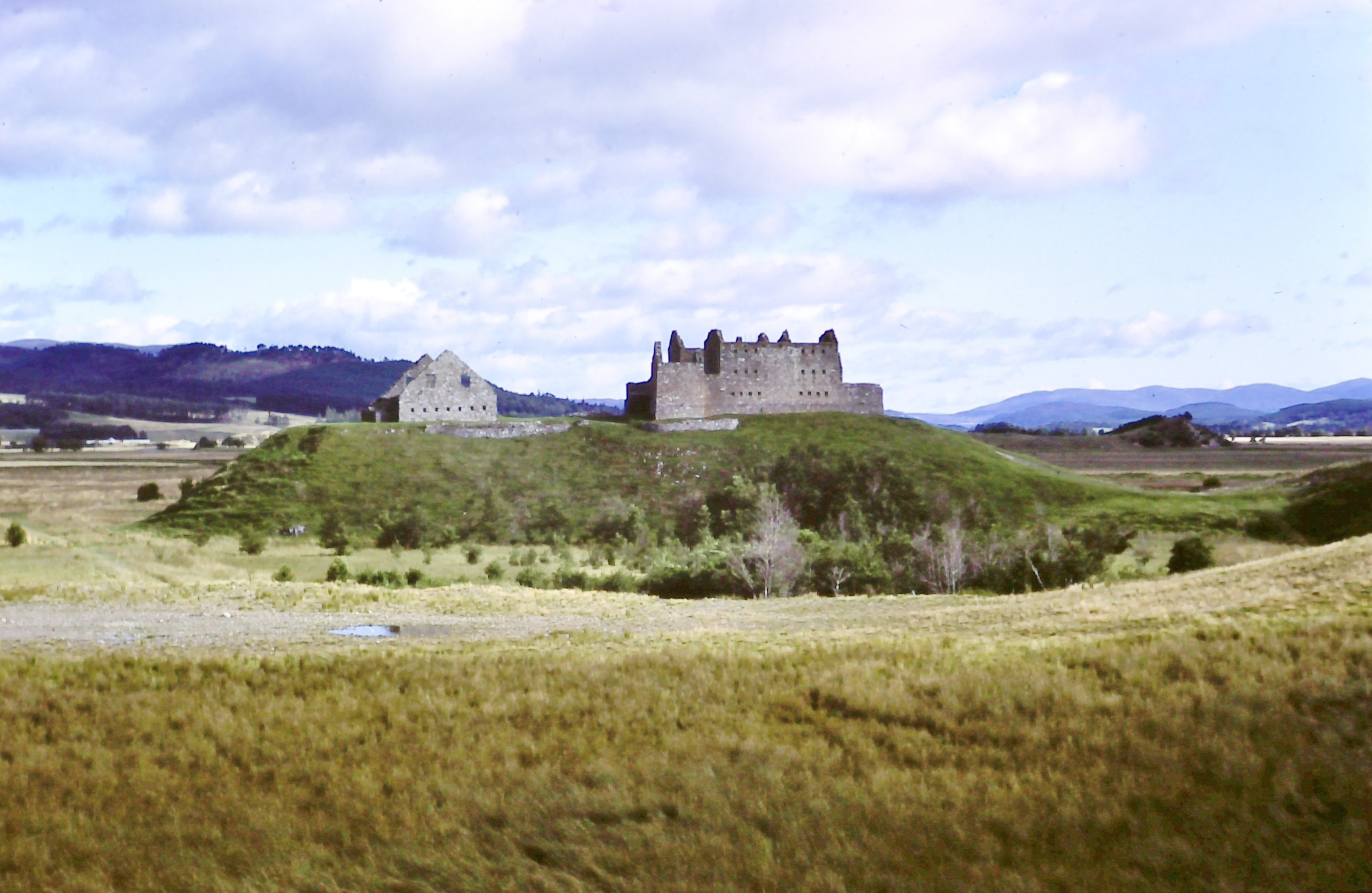
Ruthven Barracks, Kingussie

The government of George I sent Wade to inspect Scotland in 1724. He recommended the construction of barracks, bridges and proper roads to assist in the control of the country. On 10 May 1725, he was appointed Commander in Chief of His Majesty's forces, castles, forts and barracks in North Britain and was tasked with carrying out his own recommendations. Over the next twelve years Wade directed the construction of some 240 miles (390 km) of roads and 30 bridges (including the Wade's Bridge at Aberfeldy). General Wade's military roads linked the garrisons at Ruthven, Fort George, Fort Augustus, and Fort William.

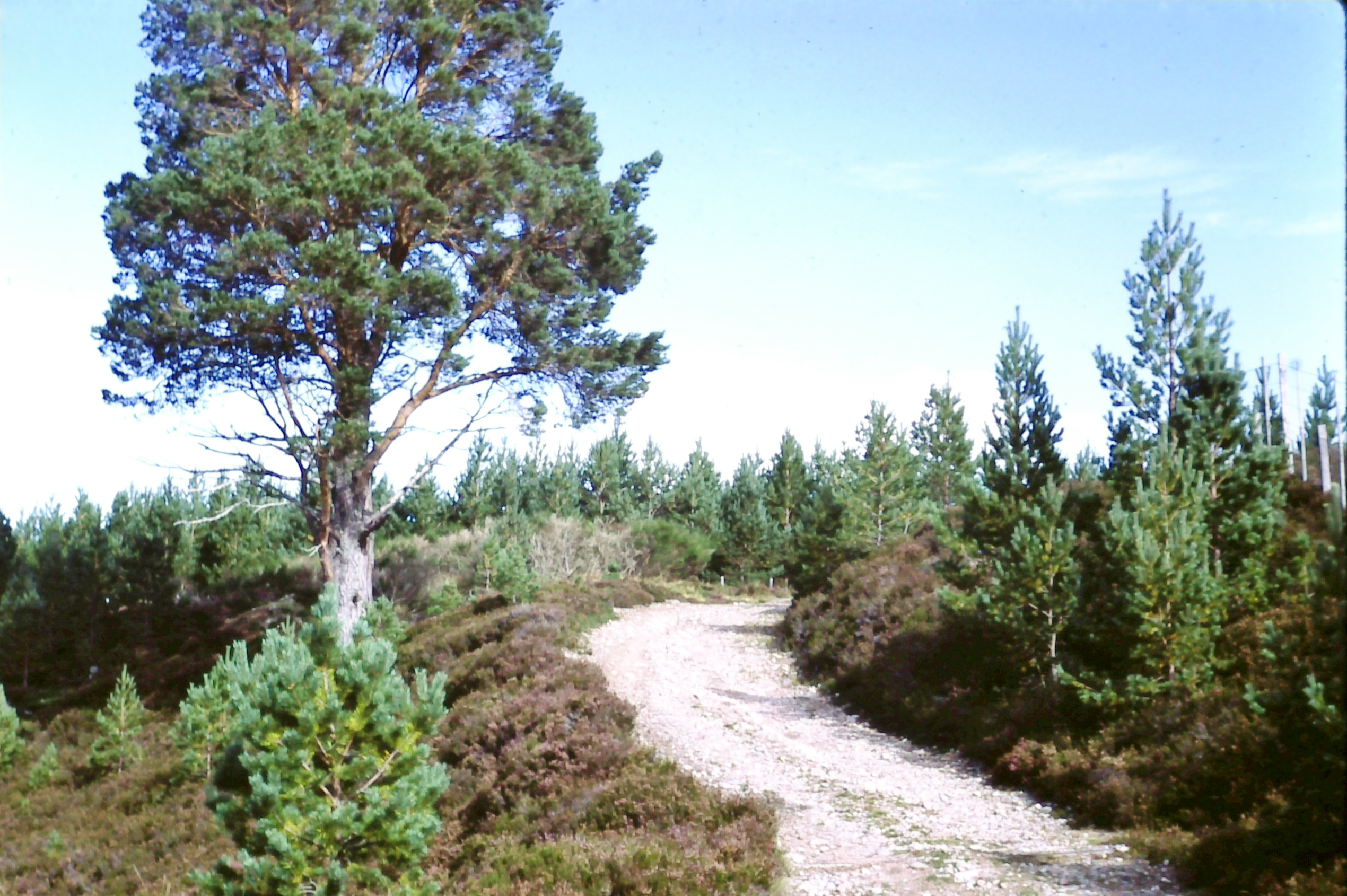
Section of Wade's military road between Inverness and Kingussie, built in the wake of the 1715 Jacobite rebellion

A reference in verse is said to be inscribed on a stone at the start of one of his military roads in Scotland:

If you had seen this road before it was made,
You would lift up your hands and bless General Wade.

Wade also organised a militia, "Highland Watches", and called on members of the landed gentry to sign up and raised the first six companies in 1725 (three of Campbells and one each of Frasers, Grants, and Munros). Also in 1725, Wade put down an insurrection after the government attempted to extend the "malt tax" to Scotland, and enraged citizens in Glasgow drove out the military and destroyed the home of their M.P. He was promoted to lieutenant general on 15 April 1727.

On 1 June 1732, he became Governor of Berwick-upon-Tweed, and on 19 June 1733, he became Governor of Fort William, Fort George and Fort Augustus. He was promoted to general of horse on 17 July 1739.

He raised four more "Highland Watch" companies in 1739, which were subsequently reorganized as the Black Watch regiment. He still had the time to sign his support to the Foundling Hospital, which was established in 1739 in London. On 22 June 1742, he was appointed Lieutenant-General of the Ordnance, and on 24 June 1742, he was appointed a member of the Privy Council.

== War of the Austrian Succession ==
On 17 December 1743 he became a field marshal with his appointment to the joint command of the Anglo-Austrian force in Flanders against the French in the War of the Austrian Succession. Wade organised an advance towards Lille in July 1744, but the action became stalled in the face of logistical problems. He resigned from his command in March 1745 and returned home to become Commander-in-Chief of the Forces.

== Jacobite rising ==
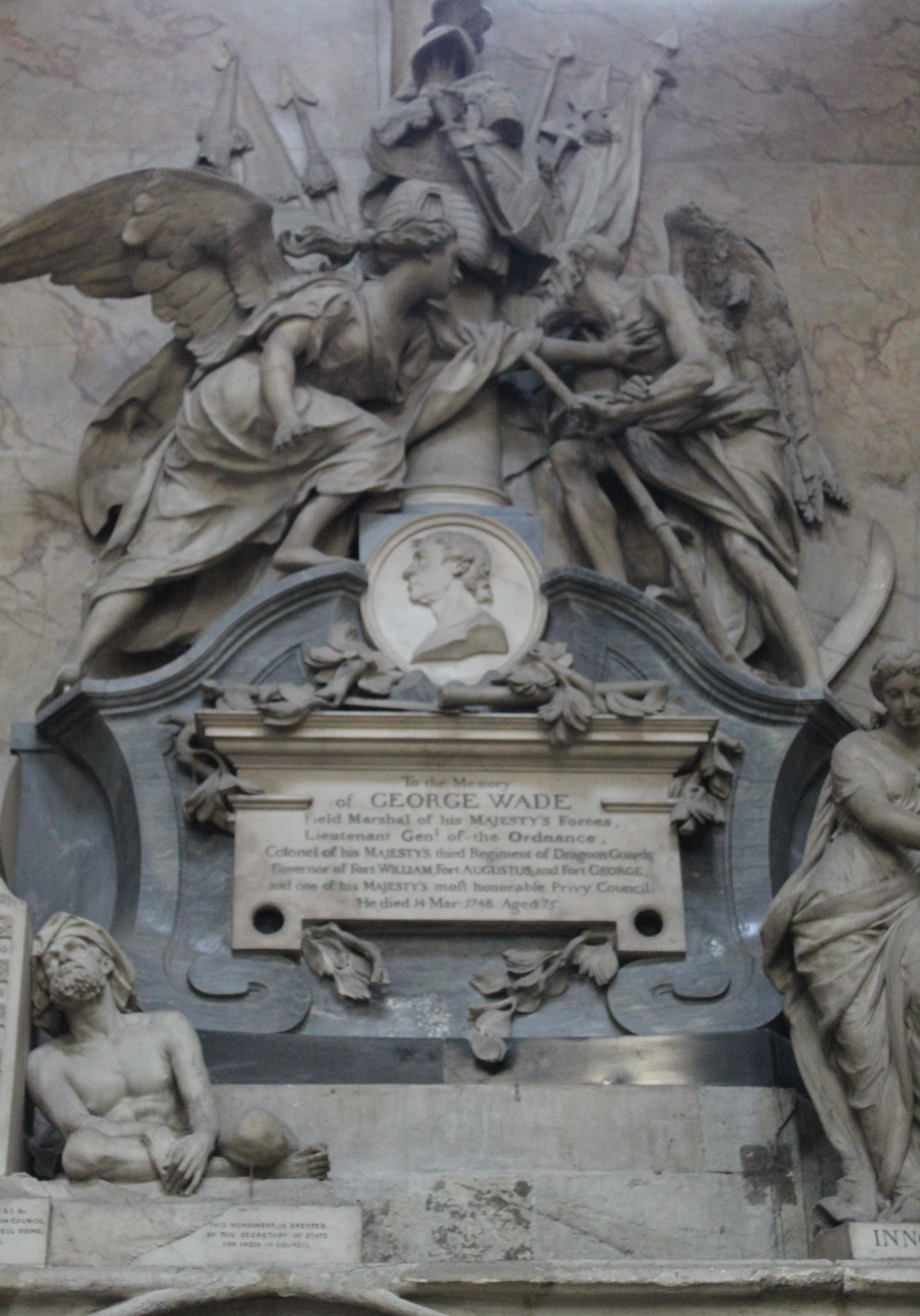
Wade's memorial in Westminster Abbey

In October 1745, during the Jacobite rising, Wade concentrated his troops in Newcastle upon Tyne, on the east coast of England; however, the Jacobite forces advanced from Scotland down the west coast of England via Carlisle into Lancashire and the speed of their advance left Wade scrambling. In freezing conditions and with his men starving, he failed to counter their march into England or their subsequent retreat from Derby to Scotland. Wade was replaced as Commander-in-Chief by Prince William, Duke of Cumberland, who led the army to success at the Battle of Culloden in April 1746.

It was because of the difficulties Wade encountered marching his troops cross-country from Newcastle to Carlisle that he built his Military Road west of Newcastle in 1746, entailing such destruction of Hadrian's Wall. Wade helped plan the road but had died before construction began in 1751. His Military Road is still in use today as the B6318; it should not be confused with the Military Way built by the Romans immediately south of Hadrian's Wall.

Wade received mention in a verse sung as part of God Save the King around 1745:

Lord, grant that Marshal Wade
May, by thy mighty aid,
Victory bring.
May he sedition hush
And, like a torrent, rush
Rebellious Scots to crush.
God save the King.

== Family life ==
Wade died unmarried on 14 March 1748 and is buried at Westminster Abbey, where his life is recognised by a monument created by Louis-François Roubiliac.

Wade left two natural (illegitimate) sons, Captains William and John Wade, and two natural daughters, Jane Erle and Emilia. Wade left most of his estate to his natural children although he provided generously for the widow and children of his brother William, Canon of Windsor, Berkshire. Wade had a second natural daughter named Emilia, who was married first in 1728 to a Mr John Mason and then to a Mr Jebb.

== Sources ==
- Chalmers, George (1887). Caledonia, or, A historical and topographical account of North Britain, vol. 2.
- Heathcote, Tony (1999). The British Field Marshals 1736-1997. Pen & Sword Books Ltd. ISBN 0-85052-696-5.
- Hiatt, Charles (2009). Westminster Abbey : a short history and description of the church and conventual buildings with notes on the monuments. Forgotten Books. ISBN 978-1-4400-3478-7.
- Pollard, Tony (2009). Culloden: The History and Archaeology of the last Clan Battle. Pen & Sword Military. ISBN 978-1-84884-020-1.
- Rodger, Nicholas (2006). Command of the Ocean: A Naval History of Britain, 1649-1815. Penguin Books. ISBN 978-0-14-102690-9.
- A copy of the Royal Charter establishing a hospital for the maintenance and education of exposed and deserted children. 1739.

Parliament of Great Britain
Preceded by Reynolds Calthorpe, the younger Richard Lockwood	Member of Parliament for Hindon; 1715–1722; With: Reynolds Calthorpe; John Pitt	Succeeded by Henry Ludlow Coker; Robert Gray
Preceded by Robert Gay; John Codrington	Member of Parliament for Bath; 1722–1747; With: John Codrington; Robert Gay; John Codrington; Philip Bennet; Robert Henley	Succeeded by Sir John Ligonier; Robert Henley
Military offices
Preceded by The Viscount Windsor	Colonel of Wade's Regiment of Dragoon Guards; 1717–1748	Succeeded by Hon. Charles Howard
Preceded by 1st Baron Carpenter	Commander-in-Chief, Scotland; 1724–1740	Succeeded by Sir John Cope
Preceded by Joseph Sabine	Governor of Berwick-upon-Tweed; 1732–1733	Succeeded by Rich Russell
Preceded by Jasper Clayton	Governor of Inverness; 1733–1748	Succeeded by Henry Hawley
Preceded by Charles Sibourg	Governor of Fort William; 1733–1743	Succeeded by Humphrey Bland
Preceded by Sir Charles Wills	Lieutenant-General of the Ordnance; 1741–1748	Succeeded by Sir John Ligonier
Preceded by The Earl of Stair	Commander-in-Chief of the Forces; 1745	Succeeded by Duke of Cumberland
