= Henry Kirkwood =

English cricketer and British Army officer

Personal information
- Full name: Henry Raphael Kirkwood
- Born: 12 October 1886; Hartley Wintney, Hampshire, England
- Died: 14 May 1954 (aged 67); Folkestone, Kent, England
- Batting: Unknown
- Bowling: Leg break

Career statistics
Competition	First-class
Matches	5
Runs scored	127
Batting average	15.87
100s/50s	–/1
Top score	50
Balls bowled	630
Wickets	12
Bowling average	30.16
5 wickets in innings	1
10 wickets in match	–
Best bowling	5/100
Catches/stumpings	3/–
- Source: Cricinfo, 6 April 2019

Henry Raphael Kirkwood (12 October 1886 – 14 April 1954) was an English first-class cricketer and British Army officer. Kirkwood spent 36 years in the Royal Army Educational Corps, serving in both world wars. He also played first-class cricket for the British Army cricket team.

== Life and military career ==
The son of John William Kirkwood and his wife, Honoria Corcoran, he was born at Hartley Wintney in Hampshire. He joined the Corps of Army Schoolmasters prior to the First World War, and was serving as an army schoolmaster in British India in 1910. Having spent a decade as a non-commissioned officer, he was made a commissioned officer in what was now the Royal Army Educational Corps in January 1921, serving as a temporary instructor at Shorncliffe Army Camp with the rank of lieutenant.

He made his debut in first-class cricket for the British Army cricket team against the Cambridge University at Fenner's in 1923. He made four further first-class appearances for the Army, the last of which came against the Royal Air Force in 1928. He scored 127 runs across his five matches, with a high score of 50 against Cambridge University in 1925. With his leg break bowling, he took 12 wickets at an average of 30.16. He took one five wicket haul when he took figures of 5 for 100 against Cambridge University, in the same match that made his only first-class half century.

He was promoted to the rank of captain in 1931. He was appointed to the British Indian Army School of Education in March 1936. He vacated this appointment in February 1937. Kirkwood served during the Second World War, during which he was promoted to the rank of major in February 1943. He retired from active service in December 1946, upon which he was granted the rank of lieutenant colonel. He died at Folkestone in April 1954.
