= Henry Hawley =

British army officer prominent during the Jacobite Rising (1685–1759)

Lieutenant-General Henry Hawley
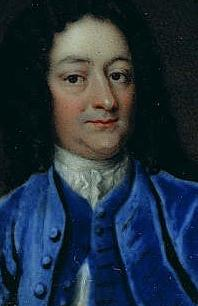

Governor of Portsmouth
- In office 8 July 1752 – 24 March 1759

Governor of Inverness
- In office 1748–1752

Commander-in-chief, Scotland
- In office December 1745 – July 1746

Personal details
- Born: 12 January 1685 Westminster, London
- Died: 24 March 1759 (aged 74) West Green House, Hampshire
- Resting place: St Mary's Church, Hartley Wintney
- Relations: Thomas Erle (uncle); Francis Hawley, 2nd Baron Hawley (cousin)

Military service
- Allegiance: Great Britain
- Branch: British Army
- Years of service: 1702–1748
- Rank: Lieutenant-General
- Unit: 4th Dragoons
- Battles/wars: War of the Spanish Succession; Battle of Almansa; Jacobite rising of 1715; Battle of Sheriffmuir; War of the Quadruple Alliance; Capture of Vigo; War of the Austrian Succession; Battle of Dettingen; Battle of Fontenoy; Battle of Lauffeld; Jacobite rising of 1745; Clifton Moor Skirmish; Battle of Falkirk Muir; Battle of Culloden

Henry Hawley (12 January 1685 – 24 March 1759) was a British army officer who served in the wars of the first half of the 18th century. He fought in a number of significant battles, including the Capture of Vigo in 1719, Dettingen, Fontenoy and Culloden.

During the Jacobite rising of 1745, he was recalled to Britain and appointed commander in Scotland in December, replacing Sir John Cope. In January 1746, he was defeated at the Battle of Falkirk Muir, although it did not damage his career in the same way. The Duke of Cumberland took over and Hawley led the cavalry at Culloden in April, a victory that ended the Rising.

Although a courageous and capable commander of cavalry, Hawley was also a strict disciplinarian, referred to by contemporaries as 'Hangman Hawley' or 'Lord Chief Justice.' While this referred to his disciplinary methods, there is evidence he bears some responsibility for the killing of Jacobite wounded after Culloden. He returned to Flanders in July 1746, and when the War of the Austrian Succession ended in 1748, he was appointed Governor of Inverness; in 1752, he became Governor of Portsmouth, near his home in Hartley Wintney, where he died in March 1759.

== Personal details ==
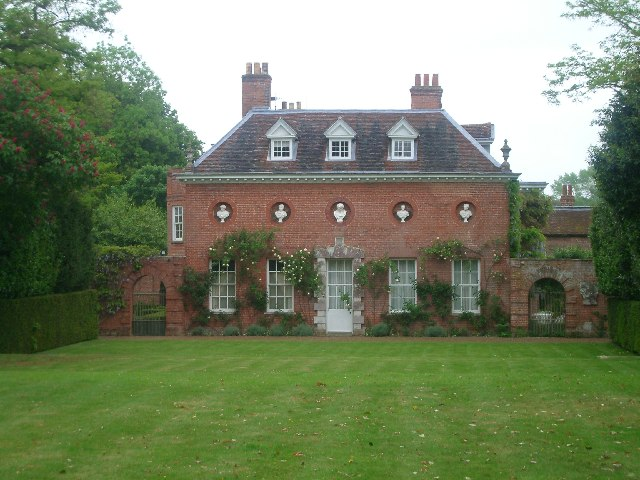
West Green House, built by Hawley in 1720, using profits from the capture of Vigo

Henry Hawley (1685–1759) was born in Westminster, London and baptised on 12 January 1685 at St Martin-in-the-Fields. His father Lieutenant-Colonel Francis Hawley (1653–1692) was related to the Hawley baronets and married Judith Hughes (1659–1735) in 1684. They had four children, Henry, Edward (ca 1686–after 1724), Anne (ca 1690–after 1762) and an unknown son who died young.

Like many of his 'historical anecdotes', Walter Scott's suggestion Hawley was an illegitimate son of George II (1683–1760) has been dismissed by historians. If true, George would have fathered him at the age of two, thirty years before his first visit to England.

Francis was killed at the August 1692 Battle of Steenkerque, leaving his family penniless. In 1694, his half-brother Thomas Erle (1650-1720) made Henry an ensign in the 19th Foot, despite being only nine years old. Commissions were then considered private assets, that could be used as an investment or to provide an income; their award to children was later discouraged, but drawing pay and delegating duties to a substitute remained a common practice. His brother Edward also received a commission and his mother was given a pension.

Hawley never married but had a long-term relationship with Elizabeth Toovey, mentioned in his will as being 'for many years my friend, companion, and often my careful nurse.' Her second son Captain William Toovey became his heir and took Hawley's name after his death in March 1759; it is suggested he may have been Hawley's natural son.

== Career ==
Francis Hawley had been Lieutenant-Colonel of the 4th Dragoons, a regiment commanded by Queen Anne's husband, Prince George of Denmark. Henry was appointed page or attendant to their son, William of Gloucester, 1689-1700; when the War of Spanish Succession began in 1702, he was commissioned into Temple's Regiment but in September 1704, Prince George arranged that this be exchanged for one in the Royal Horse Guards.

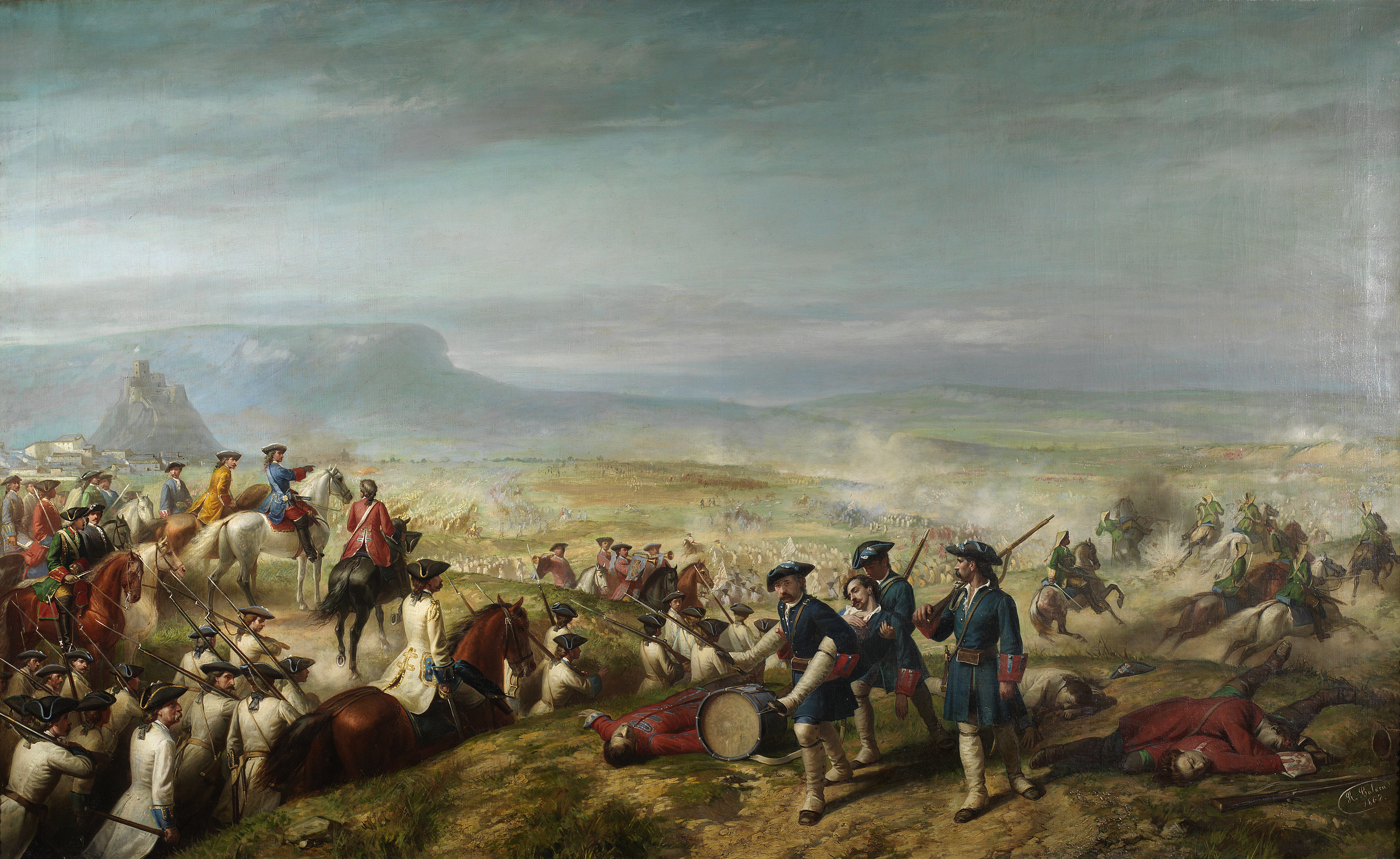
Hawley fought in the 1707 Battle of Almanza, an Allied defeat

In May 1706, Hawley became a captain in his father's old regiment, and accompanied his uncle Thomas Erle to Spain, where he fought in the 1707 Battle of Almanza. This was a decisive Bourbon victory, where most of the British infantry was taken prisoner but Hawley and the cavalry escaped. In April 1708, he returned to England with Erle, who had been selected by Marlborough to lead an expeditionary force that would land on the French coast and capture Abbeville. This plan was vetoed by the Dutch Republic; Erle retired from active service and in 1709, Hawley returned to his regiment in Scotland.

In 1710, Hawley quarrelled with a fellow officer and killed him in a duel, a common practice in this period; he was pardoned by Queen Anne, who also helped him purchase a commission as lieutenant-colonel in 1712. In August 1714, George I succeeded Anne as monarch; during the Jacobite rising of 1715, Hawley and his younger brother Edward, a Captain-Lieutenant in the same regiment, fought at Sheriffmuir.

In 1717, Hawley became Colonel of the 33rd Foot; during the War of the Quadruple Alliance in 1719, his regiment was part of the expeditionary force that captured the Spanish port of Vigo. The booty taken was immense and the expedition extremely profitable for senior officers like Hawley; in 1720, he purchased an estate near Hartley Whitney where he built West Green House, now owned by the National Trust.

Britain was at peace for the next 20 years; in 1730, Hawley became Colonel of 13th Dragoons and promoted major general in 1739. The next year, he returned to the 4th Dragoons as Colonel, which he retained until his death in 1759. At the beginning of the War of the Austrian Succession in 1741, he was offered command of British land forces sent to capture Cartagena de Indias in the West Indies but turned it down. Why he did so is unclear, although it was a notoriously unhealthy posting; the expedition ended in failure, with over 9,000 deaths from yellow fever.

Instead, he served in Flanders as deputy to Sir John Cope, commander of the cavalry reserve at the victory of Dettingen in June 1743. In December, Cope was appointed military commander in Scotland and Hawley made second-in-command of the cavalry under Cumberland. At Fontenoy in April 1745, the British cavalry was a spectator for most of the battle; after Hawley took over command from Cumberland, his handling of the cavalry enabled the Allied infantry to retreat in good order. Fontenoy was a defeat but enhanced his reputation.

== 1745 Jacobite Rising ==
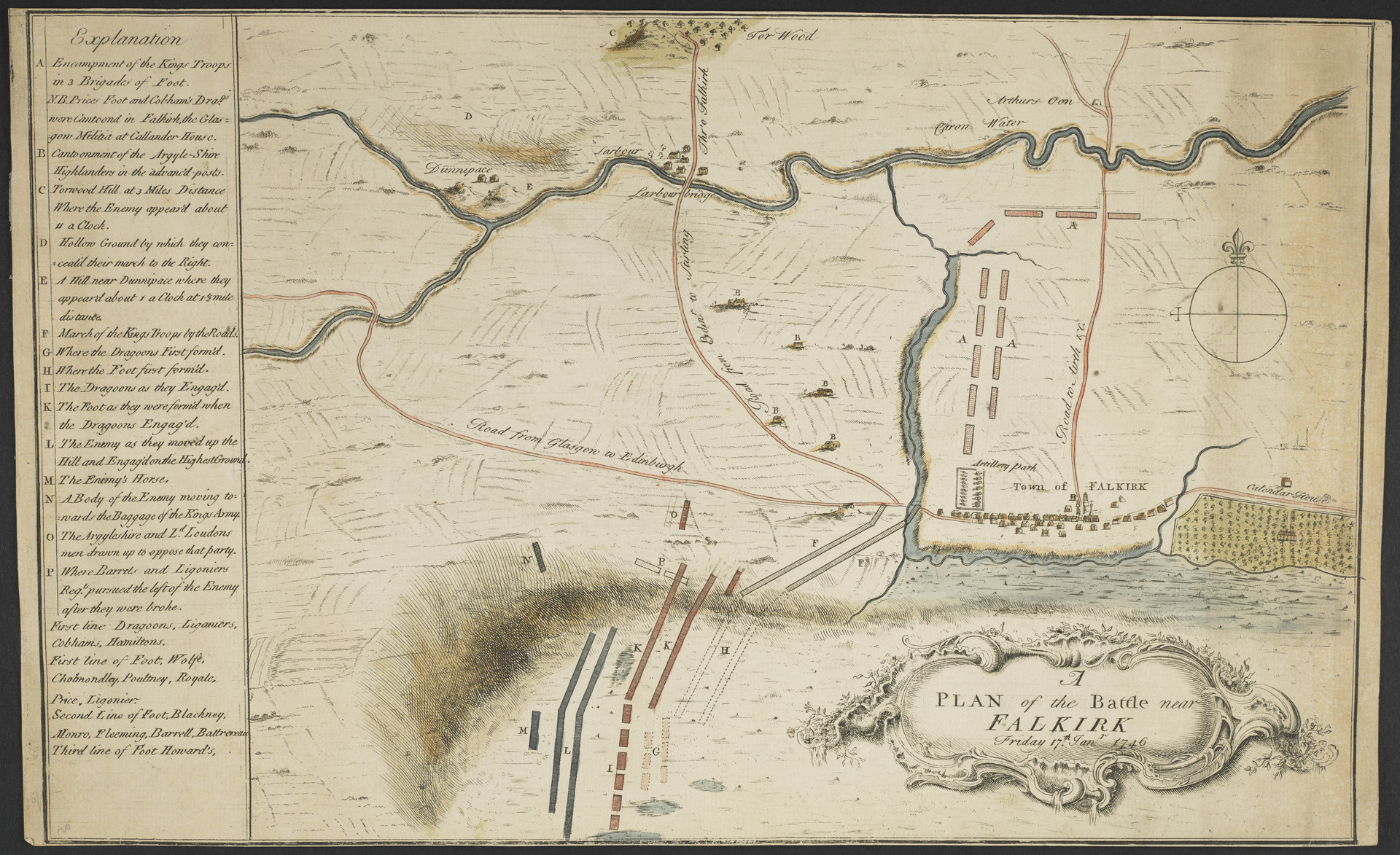
Falkirk Muir, January 1746

The Jacobite rising of 1745 began in July when Charles Edward Stuart landed in Scotland; in September, he defeated Sir John Cope at Prestonpans. The Jacobite army then invaded England, reaching Derby on 4 December before retreating into Scotland due to lack of English or French support. Hawley was among the troops that returned to Britain and was present at the Clifton Moor skirmish on 18 December; two days later, he was appointed commander-in-chief in Scotland.

The immediate objective was to secure Lowland Scotland and on 6 January Hawley arrived in Edinburgh; he had about 8,000 troops available locally, plus 2,000 militia with the Earl of Loudoun near Inverness. The Jacobites were besieging Stirling Castle and on 13 January, he ordered 4,000 troops under John Huske (1692-1761) to move towards its relief. Hawley's previous experience at Sheriffmuir in 1715 led him to overestimate the vulnerability of Highland infantry to cavalry while he seriously underestimated their fighting qualities.

This overconfidence contributed to his defeat at Falkirk Muir on 17 January, which started late in the afternoon in poor light and heavy snow and was marked by confusion on both sides. Hawley's artillery became stuck in the mud and were abandoned by their gunners, while his dragoons charged the Jacobite right. They were repulsed in disorder, scattering their own infantry but his right under Huske held its ground, retrieved the artillery and withdrew in good order, helped when the Highlanders stopped to loot the baggage train.

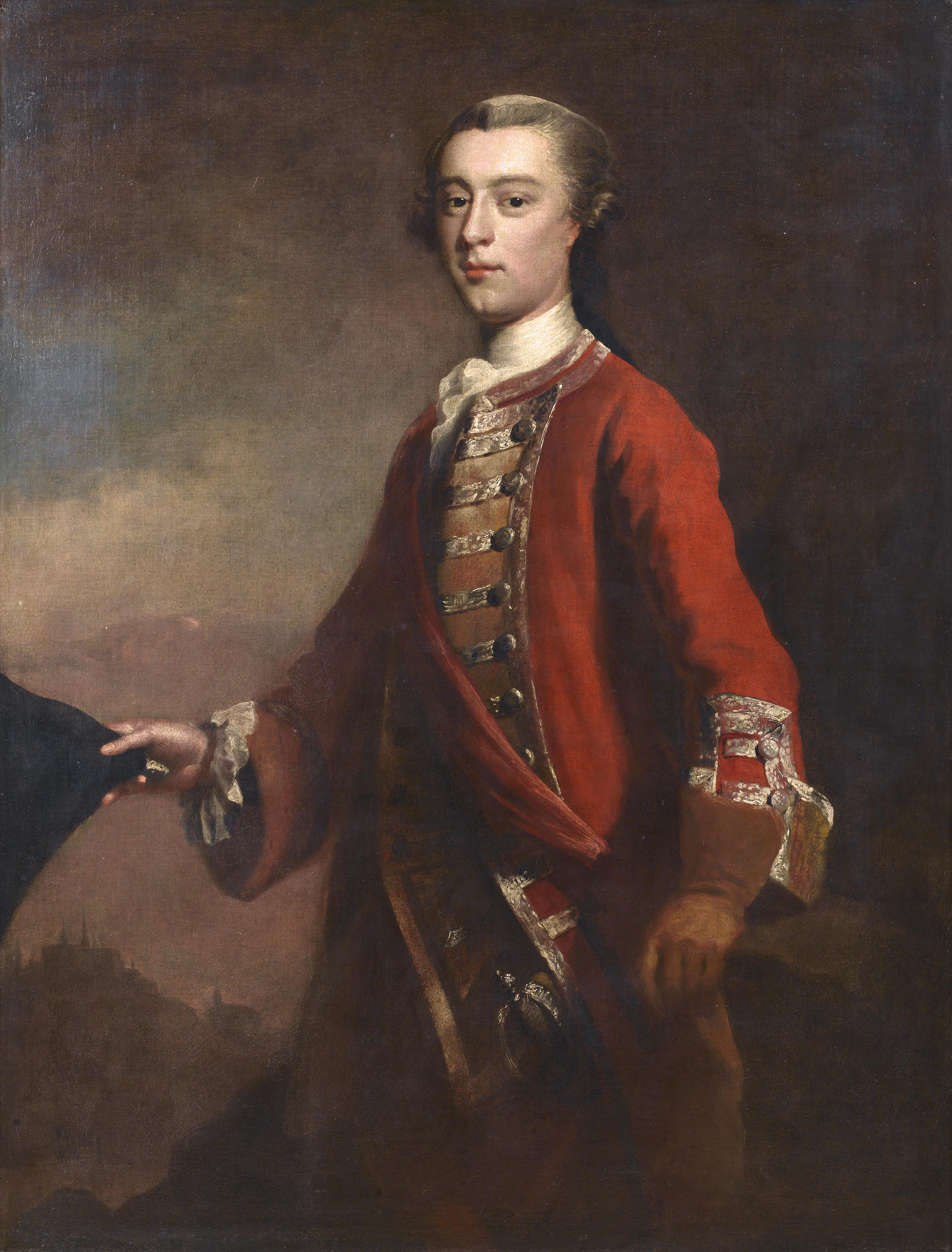
Hawley's aide at Culloden, James Wolfe, who later claimed to have been ordered to shoot Jacobite wounded after the battle

Neither he or Cumberland viewed Falkirk as a serious defeat but a high proportion of government casualties were officers abandoned by their men. Unlike Prestopans, many were experienced veterans and a number of soldiers were court-martialled, several of whom were executed. The artillery commander, Captain Archibald Cunningham, described as a 'sot' or drunkard, abandoned his guns and fled using the transport horses; he committed suicide a few days later. Unlike Cope, Hawley never faced a court-martial for Falkirk, although the writer Horace Walpole argued he was 'fifty times more culpable, since Cope miscarried by incapacity, Hawley by insolence and carelessness.'

While the Hanovarian army was recuperating in Aberdeen in the early months of 1746, Hawley was resident in Guest Row, in the town house of the George Gordon of Hallhead, who was out with the Jabobites. His wife, Amy Gordon was treated rudely by Hawley and his men and, after their departure, she complained about their behaviour, making a long list of the valuables, domestic items and provisions they had looted.

Hawley led two regiments of dragoons at the Battle of Culloden on 16 April, which lasted less than an hour and ended in a decisive government victory. Jacobite losses were estimated as between 1,200 and 1,500 dead, many of whom were killed during the pursuit that followed; this was a standard part of any 18th-century battle, and troops that held together, such as the French regulars, were far less vulnerable than those who scattered like the Highlanders. Many of the Jacobite wounded left on the battlefield were also killed, an act author and historian John Prebble refers to as 'symptomatic of the army's general mood and behaviour.'

James Wolfe, Hawley's aide-de-camp at Culloden, features in an anecdote where he refused an order to shoot a wounded Highland officer, the person giving the order variously named as Cumberland or Hawley. While such killings certainly took place, whether Wolfe was either given or refused such orders is less clear; conducting punitive raids after Culloden, he later wrote to a colleague 'as few Highlanders are made prisoner as possible.'

Wolfe had a reputation for criticising his senior officers; in 1755, he claimed the troops dread (Hawley's) severity, hate the man and hold his military knowledge in contempt and described Humphrey Bland as not so well-bred and polite as might be wished. In 1748, Cumberland described Hawley as the most competent of his cavalry leaders and his written papers show he was very far from being an unthinking martinet.

== Post-1745 and legacy ==
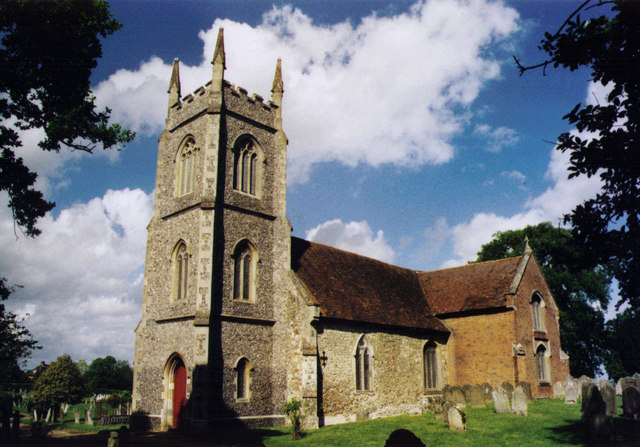
Hawley was buried here in 1759

In July 1745, the Earl of Albemarle took over as commander in Scotland and Hawley returned to Flanders with Cumberland, where he remained until the end of the War of the Austrian Succession. He took part in the 1747 Battle of Lauffeld, a decisive French victory where only cavalry charges led by Lord Ligonier saved the Allied infantry from annihilation. This ended Hawley's active military career, although he remained colonel of the 4th Dragoons until his death; in 1748, he was appointed Governor of Inverness, a post which required little service.

In 1752, he was made Governor of Portsmouth, near his home in West Green End, where he died in March 1759. He was buried in St Mary's Church, Hartley Wintney despite his will containing several comments antipathetic to religion, notably 'I hate priests of all professions.' He left £5,000 to his sister Anne and a life interest in his properties to Elizabeth Toovey. On her death, these passed to her second son, Captain William Toovey, who took Hawley's name and whose descendants owned West Green End until 1898.

== Sources ==
- Baker-Smith, Veronica (2008). Royal Discord: The Family of George II. Athena Press. ISBN 978-1847489296.
- Black, Jeremy (1998). Britain As A Military Power, 1688-1815. Routledge. ISBN 978-1857287721.
- Camp, Anthony (2007). Royal Mistresses and Bastards Fact and Fiction 1714-1936. Anthony Camp. ISBN 978-0950330822.
- Dalton, Charles (1904). English army lists and commission registers, 1661-1714 Volume IV. Eyre & Spottiswood.
- Guy, Alan (1985). Economy and Discipline: Officership and the British Army, 1714–63. Manchester University Press.
- Harbron, John D (2004). Trafalgar and the Spanish Navy The Spanish Experience of Sea Power. Conway Maritime Press. ISBN 978-0851774770.
- Houlding, JA (2008). "Bland, Humphrey (1685/6–1763)". Oxford Dictionary of National Biography (online ed.). Oxford University Press. doi:10.1093/ref:odnb/2607. (Subscription, Wikipedia Library access or UK public library membership required.)
- Massie, Alistair (2004). "Hawley, Henry". Oxford Dictionary of National Biography (online ed.). Oxford University Press. doi:10.1093/ref:odnb/12696. (Subscription, Wikipedia Library access or UK public library membership required.)
- Prebble, John (1963). Culloden (2002 ed.). Pimlico. ISBN 978-0712668200.
- Reid, Stuart (2014). Sheriffmuir 1715. Frontline Books. ISBN 978-1848327320.
- Riding, Jacqueline (2016). Jacobites: A New History of the 45 Rebellion. Bloomsbury. ISBN 978-1408819128.
- Royle, Trevor (2016). Culloden; Scotland's Last Battle and the Forging of the British Empire. Little, Brown. ISBN 978-1408704011.
- Shaw, AW, ed. (1934). Warrants etc.: January 1699, 16-31 in Calendar of Treasury Books, Volume 14, 1698-1699. HMSO.
- Tucker-Jones, Anthony (2018). The Killing Game: A Thousand Years of Warfare in Twenty Battles. History Press. ISBN 978-0750983488.

Military offices
Preceded by George Wade	Colonel, 33rd Foot; 1717–1730	Succeeded by Robert Dalzell
Preceded by Lord Harrington	Colonel, 13th Dragoons; 1730–1740	Succeeded by Robert Dalway
Preceded by 2nd Duke of Marlborough	Colonel, 4th, later Royal Regiment of Dragoons; 1740–1759	Succeeded by Henry Conway
Preceded by Roger Handasyd	Commander-in-Chief, Scotland; December 1745 – July 1746	Succeeded by 2nd Earl of Albemarle
Preceded by George Wade	Governor of Inverness; 1748–1752	Succeeded by Sir Charles Howard
Preceded by Philip Honywood	Governor of Portsmouth; 1752–1759	Succeeded by Lord Tyrawley
