= John Hylton, de jure 18th Baron Hylton =

English Baron (1699–1746)

John Hylton, de jure 18th Baron Hylton (bapt. 27 April 1699 – 25 September 1746) was an English politician.

Hylton was the second son of John Hylton (himself the second son of Henry Hylton, de jure 16th Baron Hylton) and his wife, Dorothy née Musgrave (the eldest daughter of Sir Richard Musgrave). On the death of his elder brother, Richard, the de jure 17th baron in 1722, Hylton inherited the "barony". As no Barons Hylton had been called to Parliament since the second baron in the 14th century, Hylton wasn't a peer and went by the simple name of John Hilton, Esq. He could therefore legally take a seat in the House of Commons and did so in 1727, when he became member of parliament for Carlisle. Hylton held the seat until 1741 and again from 1742 until his death in 1746. He never married and as he died without male heirs, the right to the ancient barony became abeyant upon his death. He was buried in St Catherine's Chapel, in the grounds of his ancestral home, Hylton Castle. His estate was left to his nephew, Sir Richard Musgrave, 5th Baronet, who was required to take the surname of Hylton as stated in Hylton's will.

Parliament of Great Britain
Preceded by Henry Aglionby; James Bateman	Member of Parliament for Carlisle; 1727–1741; With: Charles Howard	Succeeded by Charles Howard; John Stanwix
Preceded by Charles Howard; John Stanwix	Member of Parliament for Carlisle; 1742–1746; With: Charles Howard	Succeeded by Charles Howard; John Stanwix
Peerage of England
Preceded by Richard Hylton	Baron Hylton (de jure); 1722–1746	Succeeded by Abeyant
