= West Green House =

Country house and garden in Hampshire, England

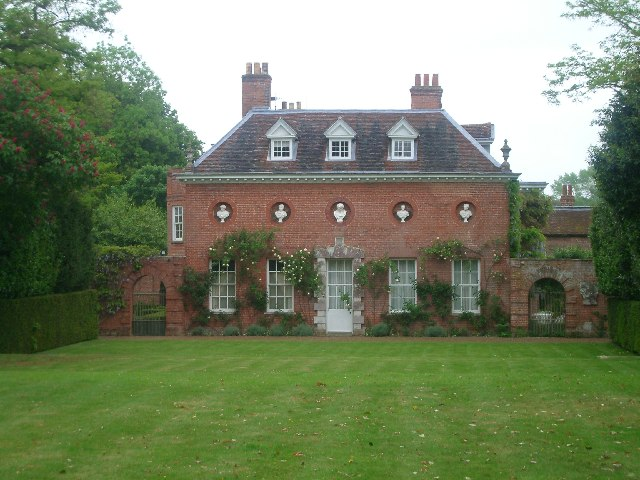
- West façade
- Interactive map of the West Green House area

General information
- Architectural style: Georgian
- Location: Hartley Wintney, Hampshire, England
- Coordinates: 51.301°N 0.932°W
- Construction started: 1714; 312 years ago
- Client: Henry Hawley
- Owner: National Trust

Technical details
- Grounds: 10 acres (4.0 ha)

Listed Building – Grade II*
- Official name: West Green House
- Designated: 8 July 1952
- Reference no.: 1242807

West Green House is an 18th-century country house and garden at West Green in Hartley Wintney in the English county of Hampshire. The house is listed Grade II*. It is known for its gardens and for its summer season of opera.

== History ==
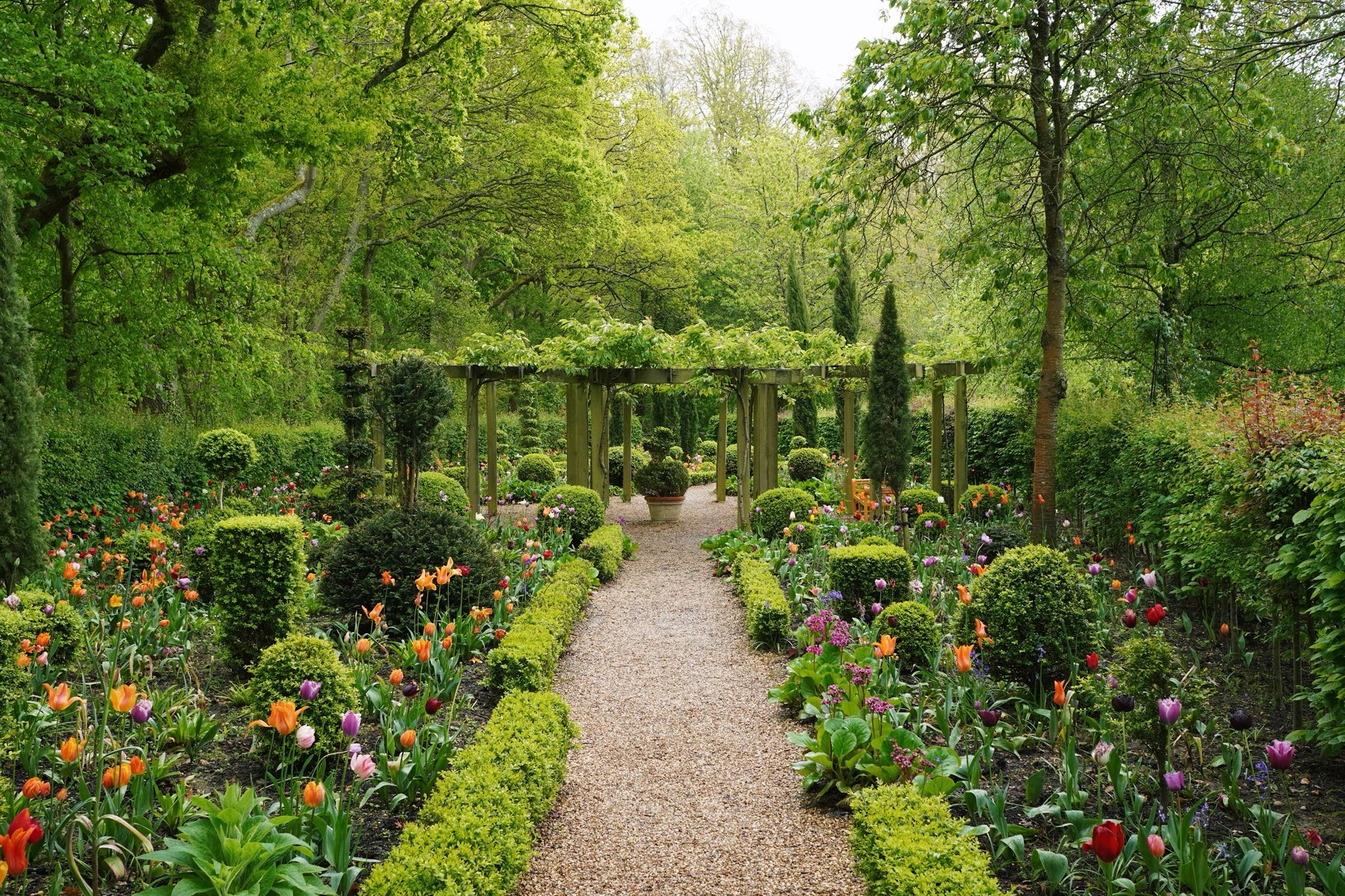
West Green House Garden

The house was built around 1714–1720, by General Henry Hawley, who led the cavalry charge at the Battle of Culloden.

At the beginning of the 20th century the Playfair family employed the architect Robert Weir Schulz to remodel the north front of the house and to design new gardens. After the Playfairs left West Green House five years later, the new owner, Evelyn, Duchess of Wellington continued to improve the gardens. The Duchess and her friend Yvonne Fitzroy occupied the house and garden for many years. Victor Sassoon bought the house and allowed the Duchess and her friend to live in house until the Duchess's death in 1939 and Fitzroy's death in 1971.

The National Trust has owned the house since 1971, after being left the property by Victor Sassoon in 1957. Alistair McAlpine acquired the lease in 1976 and added monuments designed by the classical architect Quinlan Terry.

The house was damaged by an IRA bomb attack in 1990. McAlpine had left the house three weeks previously, at the expiration of his lease.

Marylyn Abbott bought the lease from the National Trust in 1993. She had previously developed her well-known Kennerton Green garden in Mittagong, New South Wales, Australia. The gardens at West Green house now extends beyond the 18th century walls to beyond a lake created in 1997 which is surrounded by a series of perimeter gardens, one a fountain “ Paradise Garden”, another a 190 meter serpentine of iris crossed by five wisteria clad bridges. With six walled gardens, each individually planted from checkerboard topiary, to tropical plants in summer, and oriental plants around two dragons, it is a garden known for its theatricality. Alongside the garden, there is a gift-shop and cafe.

== Opera ==
Marylyn Abbott is the former marketing and tourism manager of Sydney Opera House and instituted an opera season at West Green House which is held annually in July and August. Today the opera is performed from a stage cantilevered from the lake's island with the audience seated in covered pavilions lake side.

In 2012, West Green House hosted a production by the Garsington Opera Emerging Artists programme.

== See also ==
- Country house opera
- List of opera festivals
