= John Stanwix =

British Army general

Lieutenant-General John Stanwix MP

Member of the British House of Commons
- In office 1741 – 29 October 1766
- Preceded by: John Hylton
- Succeeded by: Charles Jenkinson
- Constituency: Carlisle (1741–1742); Carlisle (1746–1761); Appleby (1754–1766)

Personal details
- Born: John Roos c. 1690 Widmerpool, England, Great Britain
- Died: 29 October 1786 (aged c. 96) Irish Sea, Atlantic Ocean
- Party: Whig

Military service
- Allegiance: Great Britain
- Years of service: 1706–1766

John Stanwix (c. 1690 – 29 October 1766) was a British soldier and politician.

== Background ==
He was born John Roos, the son of Rev. John Roos, rector of Widmerpool, Nottinghamshire. In 1725, he succeeded to the estates of his uncle Thomas Stanwix and adopted the name Stanwix.

Stanwix entered the army in 1706, rose to a captain of the grenadiers in 1739, major of marines in 1741, and lieutenant-colonel in 1745, and was appointed equerry to Frederick, Prince of Wales, in 1749. In 1750, he was appointed Governor of Carlisle, and also represented the town in the British parliament as the Member of Parliament for Carlisle (1741–42 and 1746–61).

In 1754, he became deputy quartermaster-general of the forces, and on 1 January 1756 he was made colonel-commandant of the 1st battalion of the 60th or Royal American Regiment. On his arrival in North America, he was given the command of the southern district. He had brought his son with him; he died in 1756.

During 1757 his headquarters were at Carlisle, Pennsylvania, and he was appointed brigadier-general on 27 December of that year.

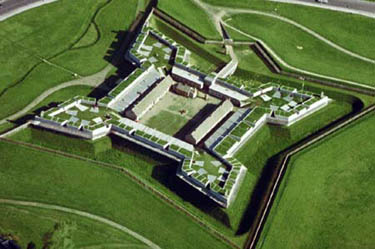
Aerial photo of a modern reconstruction of Fort Stanwix

After his relief by General John Forbes in 1758, General Stanwix went to Albany, New York, whence he was ordered to the Oneida carrying-place, to secure that important position by the erection of a work which was called Fort Stanwix in his honor. This was later the location of the signing of the Treaty of Fort Stanwix in 1768. In 1759, Stanwix returned to Pennsylvania, built and named Fort Pitt, and surmounted the works with cannon (Stanwix Street in downtown Pittsburgh is named for him) . He worked with George Croghan, the deputy superintendent of Indian affairs, to secure the good will of the Indians.

== Final years and disappearance ==
On 19 June 1759, Stanwix was appointed major-general, but he was relieved by General Robert Monckton on 4 May 1760, and became lieutenant-general on 19 January 1761. After his return to England, he was appointed lieutenant-governor of the Isle of Wight and made colonel successively of the 49th Regiment of Foot (1761–1764) and the 8th (The King's) Regiment of Foot (1764–1766).

He was also Member of Parliament for Appleby in Westmorland from 1761 to 1766.

He and his family, including his second wife Mary and his younger daughter Susanna, was lost at sea while crossing from Dublin, Ireland, to Holyhead, Wales, in a packet boat The Eagle. Swiss-born painter Angelica Kauffman painted Female figure weeping over a monumental urn (in memory of General Stanwick's daughter), appealing to the sentimental inclination of the time. This painting was considered lost before reappearing in a 2025 episode of the BBC art documentary Fake or Fortune. It was the basis of several very popular engravings.

== See also ==
- Carlisle (UK Parliament constituency)
- List of people who disappeared mysteriously at sea

Parliament of Great Britain
| Preceded by Charles Howard; John Hylton | Member of Parliament for Carlisle; 1741–1742; With: Charles Howard | Succeeded by Charles Howard; John Hylton |
| Preceded by Charles Howard; John Hylton | Member of Parliament for Carlisle; 1746–1761; With: Charles Howard | Succeeded by Raby Vane; Henry Curwen |
| Preceded by Philip Honywood; Fletcher Norton | Member of Parliament for Appleby; 1761 – 29 October 1766; With: Philip Honywood | Succeeded by Philip Honywood; Charles Jenkinson |
Military offices
| Preceded by Sir Charles Howard | Governor of Carlisle; 1752–1763 | Succeeded by The Earl of Darlington |
| Preceded by John Barrington | Colonel of the 8th (The King's) Regiment of Foot; 1764–1766 | Succeeded by Daniel Webb |
| Preceded by George Walsh | Colonel of the 49th Regiment of Foot; 1761–1764 | Succeeded by David Graeme |
