= Phoenix Green =

Village in Hampshire, England

Coordinates: 51.300000°N 0.916666°W

- Village
- Location within Hampshire
- OS grid reference: SU7562456210
  - London: 35
- District: Hart
- Shire county: Hampshire
- Region: South East
- Country: England
- Sovereign state: United Kingdom
- Post town: Hook
- Postcode district: RG27
- Dialling code: 01252
- Police: Hampshire and Isle of Wight
- Fire: Hampshire and Isle of Wight
- Ambulance: South Central
- UK Parliament: North East Hampshire

Phoenix Green is a village in the Hart District of Hampshire, England about 1 mile (1.6 km) southwest of Hartley Wintney. It has a petrol station and one pub, named The Phoenix. It is near to Winchfield railway station. It is home to the award-winning hedgehog hospital, Hedgehog Cabin.
