= William Harcourt, 3rd Earl Harcourt =

British Army officer (1743–1830)

Field Marshal The Right Honourable The Earl Harcourt GCB
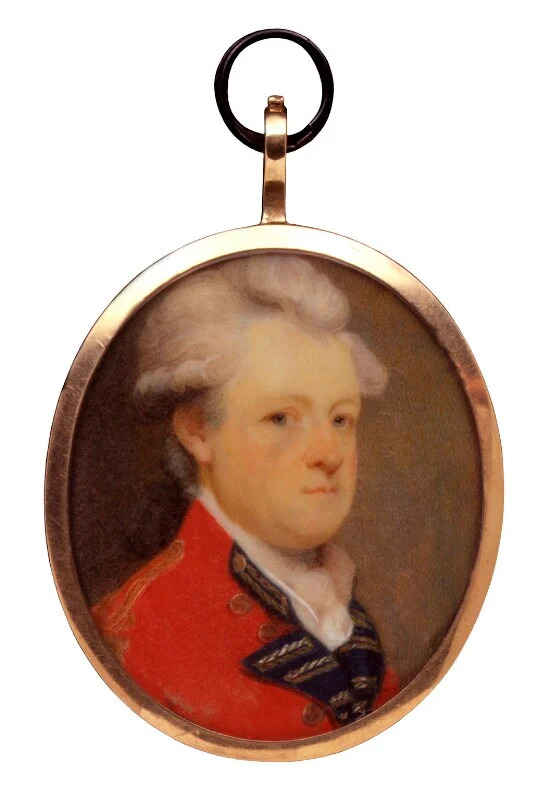
- Portrait attributed to Richard Collins, c. 1780
- Born: 20 March 1743; Stanton Harcourt, Oxfordshire
- Died: 17 June 1830 (aged 87); St Leonard's Hill, Berkshire
- Burial place: Stanton Harcourt, Oxfordshire
- Military career
- Allegiance: Great Britain; United Kingdom
- Branch: British Army
- Service years: 1759–1811
- Rank: Field marshal
- Commands: 16th Light Dragoons
- Conflicts: Seven Years' War; American War of Independence; French Revolutionary Wars
- Awards: Knight Grand Cross of the Order of the Bath

Field Marshal William Harcourt, 3rd Earl Harcourt, GCB (20 March 1743 – 17 June 1830) was a British Army officer. In the Seven Years' War, he served as an aide-de-camp to Lord Albemarle during the expedition to Havana. He also commanded his regiment at the Battle of White Plains and then captured General Charles Lee at Basking Ridge during the American War of Independence. After that he commanded the British Cavalry at the Battle of Willems during the Flanders campaign. He succeeded the Duke of York as commander during that campaign and oversaw the British retreat and their final evacuation from Bremen. His last main military role was as Governor of the Royal Military College at Great Marlow.

== Life ==
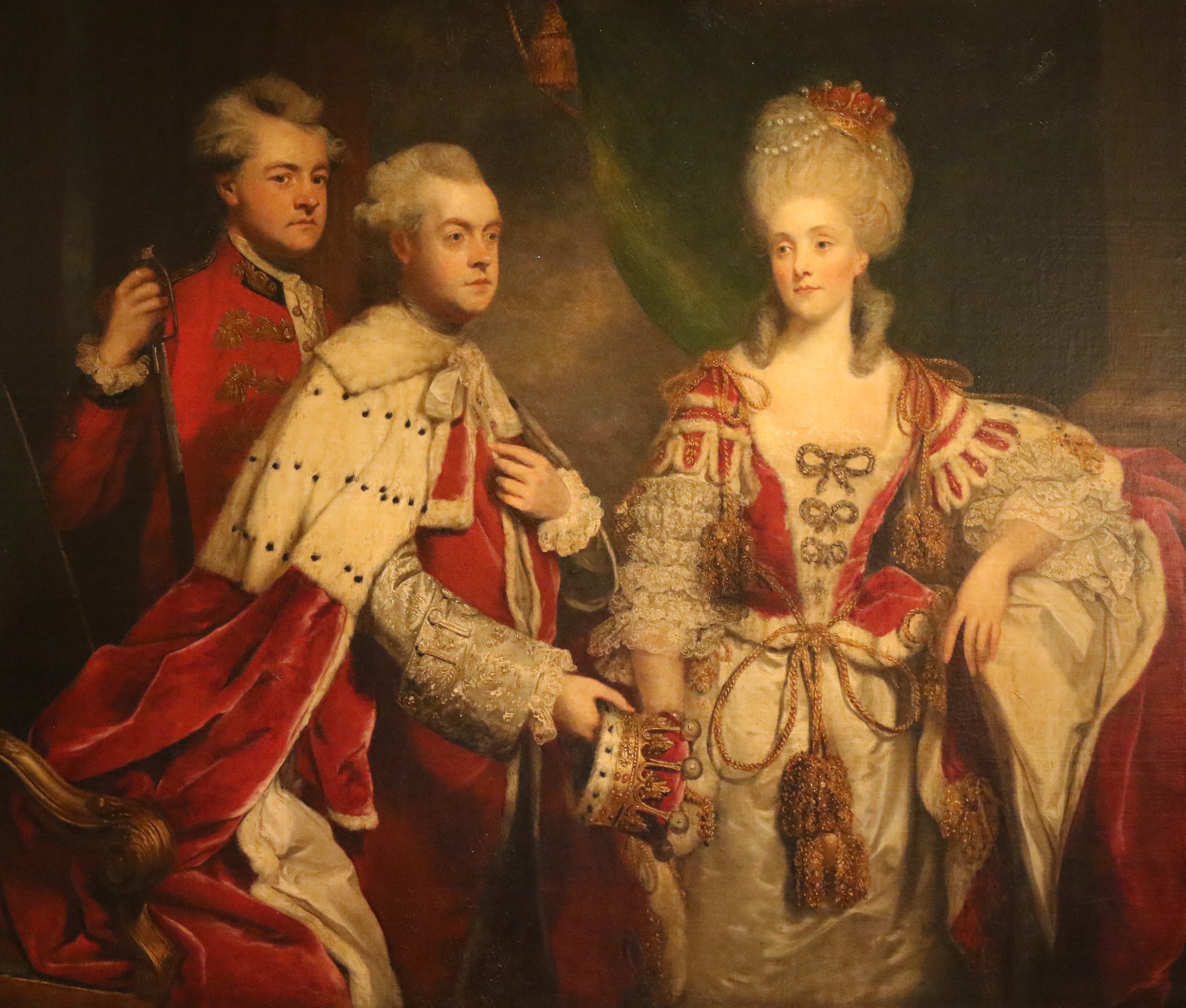
c. 1780 portrait of Harcourt (first from left)

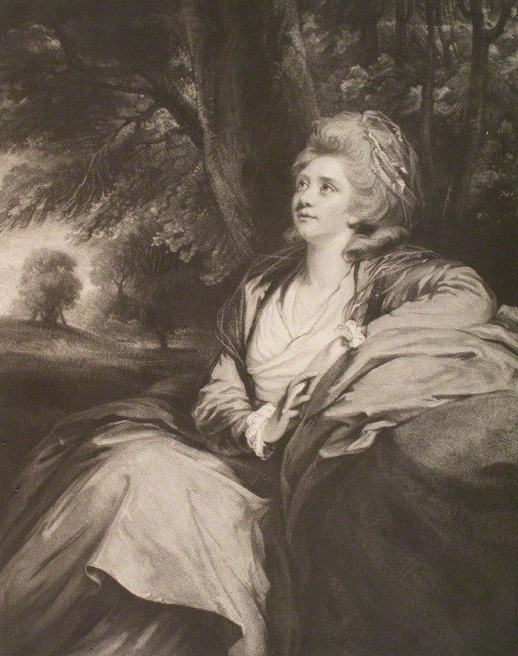
Engraving of Harcourt's wife Mary

Born the younger son of Simon Harcourt, 1st Earl Harcourt and Rebecca Harcourt (née Samborne Le Bas), Harcourt was commissioned]as an ensign in the 1st Regiment of Foot Guards on 10 August 1759. He became a captain in the 16th Light Dragoons, a regiment which had been raised at his father's expense and was known as "Harcourt's Black Horse", on 27 October 1759. Harcourt transferred to the 3rd Dragoons on 30 June 1760 and was subsequently sent to Mecklenburg-Strelitz with his father to escort the consort-elect of George III, Charlotte of Mecklenburg-Strelitz, to England. In recognition of this mission he was appointed an equerry to Charlotte later that year.

Harcourt served as an aide-de-camp to Lord Albemarle during the siege of Havana in 1762 during the Seven Years' War. He was promoted to lieutenant colonel and given command of the 31st Regiment of Foot in November 1764, the 4th Light Dragoons in April 1765 and of the 16th Light Dragoons in June 1768. In 1766 he was appointed a Groom of the Bedchamber to George III, a post he held until 1808, when he was made Master of the Robes until 1809, after which he was Master of the Horse to Queen Charlotte until 1818. He also sat in Parliament as Member of Parliament for Oxford from 1768 to 1774.

During the American War of Independence, Harcourt commanded the 16th Light Dragoons at the Battle of White Plains in October 1776 and captured General Charles Lee of the Continental Army at Basking Ridge, New Jersey in December 1776. Promoted to colonel on 29 August 1777, he became aide-de-camp to George III in September 1777 and honorary colonel of the 16th Light Dragoons in October 1779. Harcourt bought St Leonard's Hill in Clewer from the Duke of Gloucester in 1781 and, having been promoted to major general on 20 November 1782, he was then appointed Deputy Ranger of Windsor Great Park.

Promoted to lieutenant-general on 18 October 1793, Harcourt commanded the British cavalry at the Battle of Willems in May 1794 during the Flanders campaign. Appointed the governor of Fort William on 21 March 1794, he succeeded the Duke of York as commander during the Flanders campaign and oversaw the British retreat and their final evacuation from Bremen in Spring 1795. On his return to England he was appointed governor of Kingston-upon-Hull.

Harcourt was promoted to general on 1 January 1798 and he became the first governor of the Royal Military College at Great Marlow in June 1801. Appointed as a Deputy Lieutenant of Berkshire in November 1801, he succeeded his elder brother George to the earldom in April 1809 and was appointed governor of Portsmouth in July 1811. Appointed a Knight Grand Cross in the Order of the Bath on 20 May 1820 and promoted to field marshal on 17 July 1821, Harcourt bore the Union standard at the coronation of George IV on 19 July 1821. He went on to become governor of Plymouth in 1827.

Harcourt died at St Leonard's Hill on 17 June 1830 and was buried at Stanton Harcourt in Oxfordshire. The estates passed to his first cousin, Edward Vernon, who was Archbishop of York and son of his aunt Martha Harcourt; on inheriting the estates Vernon changed his name to Harcourt. A monument to Harcourt can be seen in the North Quire Aisle of St George’s Chapel, Windsor. The figure, sculpted by Robert William Sievier in 1832, was originally intended for St Michael's Church in Stanton Harcourt, but was moved to its current location on the orders of William IV after the King took a liking to the "splendid statue". Where the original statue was to be placed in the south transept of Stanton Harcourt, now stands a plaster model, identical to the white marble figure at Windsor.

== Family ==
On 3 September 1778 Harcourt married Mary, widow of Thomas Lockhart of Craig House in Scotland, and daughter of the Rev. W. Danby of Farnley in North Yorkshire; they had no children.

== Sources ==
- Heathcote, Tony (1999). The British Field Marshals, 1736–1997: A Biographical Dictionary. Barnsley: Leo Cooper. ISBN 0-85052-696-5.

Parliament of Great Britain
Preceded by Robert Lee; Sir Thomas Stapleton, Bt	Member of Parliament for Oxford; 1768–1774; With: George Nares 1768–1771; Lord Robert Spencer 1771–1774	Succeeded by Lord Robert Spencer; Peregrine Bertie
Military offices
Preceded by Lt-Gen John Burgoyne	Colonel of the 16th Regiment of Light Dragoons; 1779–1830	Succeeded by Sir John Vandeleur
Preceded by James Murray	Governor of Fort William; 1794–1795	Succeeded by Edmund Stevens
Preceded by The Marquess Townshend	Governor of Kingston-upon-Hull; 1795–1801	Succeeded by The Earl of Clanricarde
New office	Governor of the Royal Military College; 1801–1811	Succeeded by Sir Alexander Hope
Preceded by Hon. Henry Fox	Governor of Portsmouth; 1811–1826	Succeeded by Sir William Keppel
Preceded by The Duke of Wellington	Governor of Plymouth; 1827–1830	Succeeded by The Lord Hill
Court offices
Preceded by The Lord Selsey	Master of the Robes; 1808–1809	Succeeded by Hon. Henry Sedley
Preceded by The Earl Harcourt	Master of the Horse to Queen Charlotte; 1809–1818	Succeeded by None (death of Queen Charlotte)
Peerage of Great Britain
Preceded by George Harcourt	Earl Harcourt; 1809–1830	Extinct
