= St Mary's Church, Hartley Wintney =

Coordinates: 51.2968°N 0.9002°W

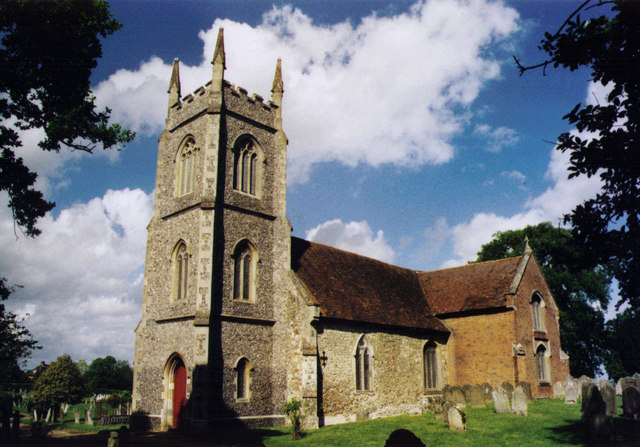
- St Mary's Church, Hartley Wintney, from the southwest

- Location in Hampshire
- OS grid reference: SU 768 558
- Location: Hartley Wintney, Hampshire
- Country: England
- Denomination: Anglican
- Website: Churches Conservation Trust

Architecture
- Functional status: Redundant
- Heritage designation: Grade II*
- Designated: 24 November 1961
- Architectural type: Church
- Style: Gothic, Gothic Revival
- Groundbreaking: 13th century
- Completed: Mid-nineteenth century

Specifications
- Materials: Body of church flint with some puddingstone and brick Transepts brick Tower flint Roofs tiled

St Mary's Church is a redundant Anglican church in the village of Hartley Wintney, Hampshire, England. It is recorded in the National Heritage List for England as a designated Grade II* listed building, and is under the care of the Churches Conservation Trust. The church stands on a hillside to the south of the village, some 8 miles (13 km) east of Basingstoke.

== History ==
The church was built in the 13th century by the nuns of Wintney Priory. At this time it consisted of a nave and a chancel. In 1416, two carpenters from Basingstoke, John Willam and William Austin, made a contract with the Prioress, Joan Bannebury, to replace the roof and a belfry set on four posts.

The transepts and the tower were added in the middle of the 19th century. St Mary's was replaced as the parish church when a new church dedicated to Saint John was built in the village, and St Mary's became a mortuary chapel. The church was declared redundant on 13 March 1974 and was vested in the Churches Conservation Trust on 22 October 1975.

== Architecture ==
=== Exterior ===
The nave and chancel are constructed in flint with some puddingstone and brick. The transepts are in red brick, and the tower is in flint. The church is roofed with red tiles. Its plan consists of a nave and chancel, with north and south transepts, and a west tower. The chancel measures 17 feet 9 inches (5.4 m) by 15 feet (4.6 m), the nave 50 feet 10 inches (15.5 m) by 20 feet (6.1 m), the transepts 17 feet 5 inches (5.3 m) by 12 feet (3.7 m), and the tower is 12 feet (3.7 m) square. The windows in the sides of the chancel and nave date from the 14th and 15th centuries, and have one, two or three lights. The windows in the transepts, and the three-light east window, date from the 19th century. The tower is in three stages with diagonal corner buttresses. In the bottom stage is a west door, and a single-light window on the north and south sides. The middle stage contains two-light windows on the north, west and south sides, and in the top stage are three-light bell openings an all sides. At the top of the tower is an embattled parapet with a pinnacle at each corner.

=== Interior ===
In the chancel is a 12th-century piscina, and a hagioscope (squint). Also in the church are box pews, a communion rail dating from the early 18th century, hatchments, and a royal arms dated 1705. There are the remains of 13th-century wall paintings, including one depicting Saint Christopher, and another showing Saint George killing the dragon.

== Burials ==
- Henry Hawley, nicknamed "Hangman", who defeated Charles Edward Stuart ("Bonny Prince Charlie") at the Battle of Culloden
- William Lethaby, architect
- Alan Brooke, 1st Viscount Alanbrooke, Chief of the Imperial General Staff during the Second World War
- Ambrose Heal
- Robert Weir Schultz, Arts and Crafts architect

== See also ==
- List of churches preserved by the Churches Conservation Trust in South East England
