= John Codrington =

English politician (c. 1677–1754)

John Codrington (c. 1677–1754), of Codrington, Gloucestershire and Wraxall, Somerset, was an English Tory politician who sat in the House of Commons between 1710 and 1741.

== Early life ==
Codrington was the eldest son of Robert Codrington of Codrington and Didmarton, Gloucestershire and his wife Agnes Samwell, daughter of Richard Samwell of Upton and Gayton, Northamptonshire. He was baptized on 10 January 1677. He matriculated at University College, Oxford in 1695. He married as his first wife Jane Tynte widow of Fortescue Tynte and daughter of Mr Giffard of Cannington, near Bridgwater, Somerset. She died in 1702 and he made a financially advantageous second marriage, by licence dated 24 September 1709, to Elizabeth Gorges, daughter of Samuel Gorges of Wraxall, Somerset. She brought him several estates in Somerset including Wraxall.

== Political career ==
Codrington had stood for Parliament at Bath in 1702 and 1705, but was unsuccessful. He was returned as Member of Parliament (MP) for Bath at the general elections of 1710. In 1712 he was instrumental in steering through Parliament a bill to make the Avon navigable between Bristol and Bath. He was returned again for Bath in 1713 and 1715. His father died in 1717 and he succeeded to his estates. He was returned for Bath at the 1722, but lost the seat at the 1727 general election. He regained the seat at Bath in 1734 but was defeated again in 1741. He did not stand again.

== Death and legacy ==
Codrington's wife Elizabeth died in 1740 and he died on 17 April 1754. They had four daughters of whom only one left children.

Parliament of Great Britain
| Preceded by Samuel Trotman; William Blathwayt | Member of Parliament for Bath; 1710–1727; With: Samuel Trotman 1710-1720; Robert Gay 1720-1722; General George Wade 1722-1727 | Succeeded by General George Wade; Robert Gay |
| Preceded by General George Wade; Robert Gay | Member of Parliament for Bath; 1734–1741; With: General George Wade | Succeeded by General George Wade; Philip Bennet |
