= Charles Howard (British Army officer) =

British Army officer and politician

General The Honourable Sir Charles Howard KB
- Portrait by David Morier, 1745

Governor of Inverness
- In office 1752–1765

Governor of Carlisle
- In office 1749–1752

Member of Parliament for Carlisle
- In office 1727–1761 Serving with John Hylton (1727–1741); John Stanwix (1741–1742, 1746–1761); John Hylton (1742–1746)

Personal details
- Born: c. 1696
- Died: 26 August 1765 (aged 68–69) Bath, Somerset, England
- Children: 2
- Parent: Charles Howard (father)
- Relatives: Arthur Capell (grandfather)
- Military career
- Allegiance: Great Britain
- Rank: General
- Units: 2nd Regiment of Foot Guards; 16th Regiment of Foot; Wynne's Dragoons; 19th Regiment of Foot; 3rd Regiment of Dragoon Guards
- Conflicts: War of the Austrian Succession; Battle of Dettingen; Battle of Fontenoy; Battle of Rocoux

General Sir Charles Howard KB (c. 1696 – 26 August 1765) was a British Army officer and politician.

== Background ==
He was the second son of the 3rd Earl of Carlisle and Lady Anne de Vere Capell, daughter of the 1st Earl of Essex. Howard was a Groom of the Bedchamber from 1714 to 1727 and Member of Parliament (MP) for Carlisle from 1727 to 1761.

== Military career ==
He was commissioned an ensign in the 2nd Regiment of Foot Guards on 10 April 1715. He was promoted to captain of a company of the 16th Regiment of Foot on 10 June 1717. He briefly transferred to Wynne's Dragoons, and on 21 April 1719, returned to the 2nd Foot Guards as captain of a company and lieutenant-colonel in the Army. In 1725, Howard was appointed Lieutenant-Governor of Carlisle and in 1734 colonel and aide-de-camp to King George II of Great Britain. In 1738, he received the command of the 19th Regiment of Foot, which under him became known as The Green Howards. His regiment took part in the War of the Austrian Succession and in 1742, Howard became brigadier-general. He commanded a brigade in the Battle of Dettingen in 1743 and as result was promoted to major-general a week later. He fought in the Battle of Fontenoy in 1745, and commanded the British Infantry in the Battle of Rocoux in 1746. He was made lieutenant-general in the days after the Battle of Val in 1747.

== After the war ==
After the war Howard was transferred to the 3rd Regiment of Dragoon Guards in 1748 and in 1749, created a Knight of the Bath. He was appointed Governor of Fort George and Fort Augustus (Governor of Inverness) for life in 1752 and in 1765, three months before his death, promoted to the rank of general.

He died at Bath, Somerset and is buried in The Mausoleum, Castle Howard. Unmarried, his will mentions two illegitimate children:

- William Howard, a captain in Major General Brudenel's Regiment.
- Eleanor Howard, married John Dalrymple of St. James, Westminster, esquire in 1765.

Parliament of Great Britain
Preceded by James Bateman; Henry Aglionby	Member of Parliament for Carlisle; 1727–1761; With: John Hylton 1727–1741; John Stanwix 1741–1742, 1746–1761; John Hylton 1742–1746	Succeeded by Raby Vane; Henry Curwen
Military offices
Preceded by Richard Sutton	Colonel of the 19th Regiment of Foot; 1738–1748	Succeeded by Lord George Beauclerk
Preceded by George Wade	Colonel of the 3rd Regiment of Dragoon Guards; 1748–1765	Succeeded by Lord Robert Manners
Preceded by John Folliot	Governor of Carlisle; 1749–1752	Succeeded by John Stanwix
Preceded by Henry Hawley	Governor of Inverness; 1752–1765	Succeeded by Studholme Hodgson
