= Hartley Wintney =

Village and parish in Hampshire, England

Coordinates: 51.3043°N 0.9054°W

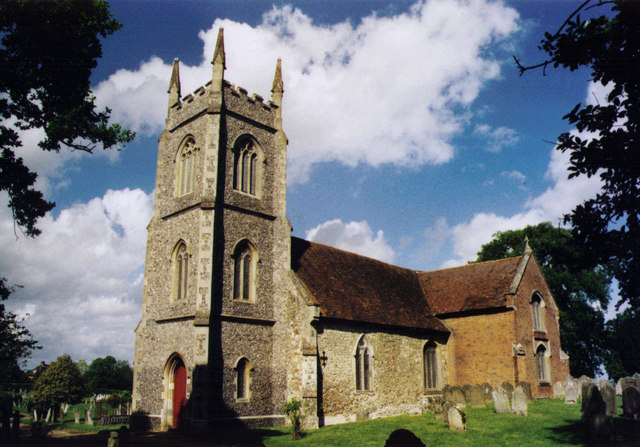
- St Mary's parish church

- Location within Hampshire
- Population: 5,925 (2021 census)
- OS grid reference: SU764567
  - London: 39 mi (63 km)
- Civil parish: Hartley Wintney
- District: Hart
- Shire county: Hampshire
- Region: South East
- Country: England
- Sovereign state: United Kingdom
- Post town: Hook
- Postcode district: RG27
- Dialling code: 01252
- Police: Hampshire and Isle of Wight
- Fire: Hampshire and Isle of Wight
- Ambulance: South Central
- UK Parliament: North East Hampshire
- Website: Hartley Wintney Parish Council

Hartley Wintney is a large village and civil parish in the Hart district of Hampshire, England. It lies about 3 miles (5 km) northwest of Fleet and 8 miles (13 km) east of Basingstoke. The parish includes the smaller contiguous village of Phoenix Green as well as the hamlets of Dipley, Elvetham, Hartfordbridge, and West Green. The 2021 census recorded the parish's population as 5,925.

The village has a typical wide Hampshire main street, lined with local businesses, shops, an osteopath and pubs. It is known for its numerous antique shops.

The village is twinned with Saint-Savin near Poitiers, France and with Malle in Belgium.

== History ==
In prehistory the area was probably fairly heavily wooded with a lake and a marshy area. The Domesday Book of 1086 does not record Hartley Wintney by name. Both before and after the Norman conquest of England it was probably part of the royal manor of Odiham.

The earliest record of Hartley Wintney by name is from the 12th century, when Wintney Priory of Cistercian nuns was founded there. In the 13th century its toponym was variously recorded as Hercelega, Hurtlegh or Hertleye Wynteneye. This last version means "forest clearing where the deer graze by Winta's island". Winta was probably a Saxon who held the island in the marshes. The toponym was recorded as Hurtleye Winteney or Wytteneye in the 14th century and Herteley Witney in the 16th century.

About 100 years after the Norman conquest Hartley Wintney was made a separate manor held by the FitzPeter family. It was Geoffrey FitzPeter who founded the Cistercian priory. A deer park stretched from Odiham to the outskirts of the settlement and to the north. It was used for 600 years by royalty and others for hunting, and its wood was used for fuel.

=== Elvetham Hall ===
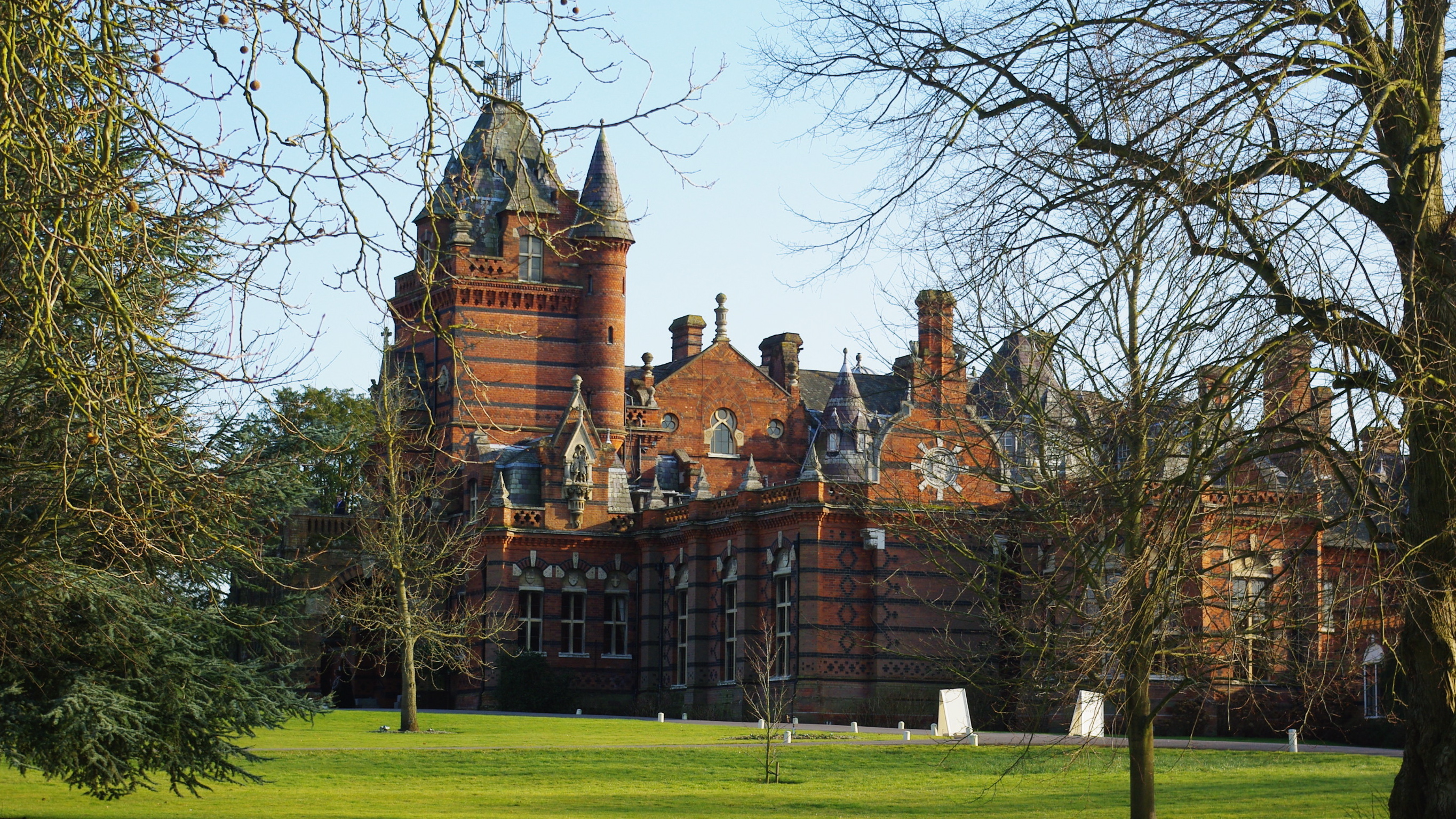
Part of Elvetham Hall

Elvetham was a manor by the time of Edward the Confessor in the 11th century. There has been a country house there since at least 1535, when John Seymour entertained Henry VIII there. Edward Seymour, 1st Earl of Hertford entertained Elizabeth I there in 1591. Of that house no trace remains. The present Elvetham Hall was designed by Samuel Sanders Teulon and built in 1859–62. It is now a grade II* listed building. Formerly the seat of the Barons Calthorpe, the house is now a 70-bedroom hotel, conference and banqueting venue.

Elvetham had a parish church from an early date, but in 1840 it was dismantled. The present Romanesque Revival church of St Mary the Virgin in the grounds of Elvetham Hall was completed in 1841. In the 20th century the Diocese of Winchester declared it redundant. The church is now one of Elvetham Hall's conference and banqueting venues.

=== Air crash ===
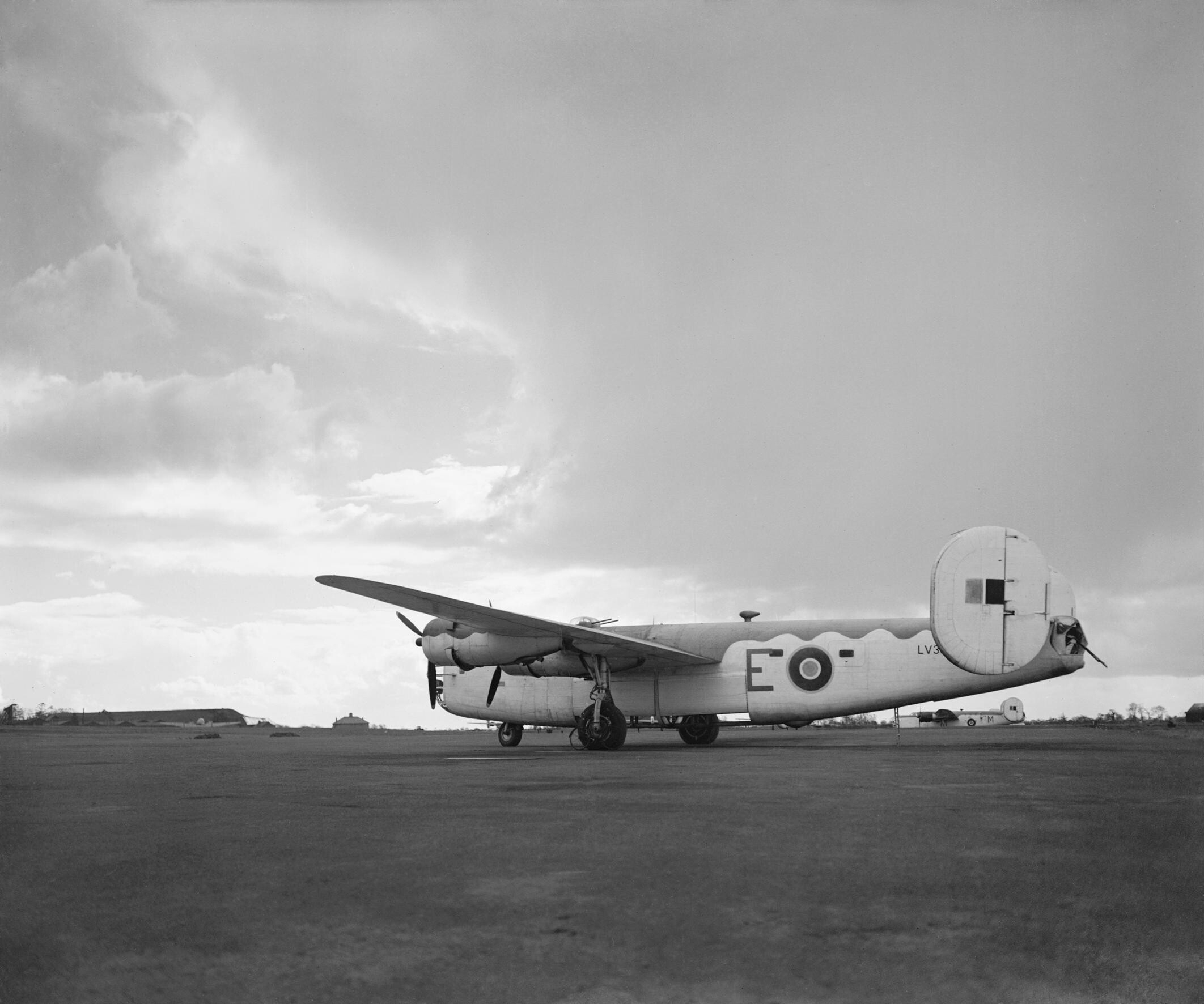
A Consolidated B-24 Liberator GR.VI of No. 200 Squadron RAF. This is the same version of B-24 as the one from 311 Squadron that crashed at Elvetham.

On 5 October 1945 a Consolidated B-24 Liberator GR.VI aircraft of No. 311 Squadron RAF crashed and burst into flames in a field on the Elvetham Hall estate. All of its passengers and RAF crew were Czechoslovak. All twenty-three people aboard were killed, including five young children who were aged from 18 months to three years old. The Flight List had the names of the five crew and the seventeen civilians who were on board the plane. However an extra civilian was found, a woman. Thirteen of the civilians were buried in a communal grave in Brookwood Civil Cemetery, and the crew received a military burial 100 metres away in Brookwood Military Cemetery. The extra casualty was Edita Sedlakova who had initially been offloaded in favour of a replacement but she had stowed aboard the flight. Sedlakova had not long been married to the Flight Engineer, Zdenek Sedlak, and this was their honeymoon flight home. Edita lies in the communal grave while Zdenek is in the Military Cemetery. Edita was just 19 years old.

== Geography ==
The parish includes large wooded areas such as Yateley Heath Wood and part of Hazeley Heath. The River Hart flows through the parish northeast of the village. The River Whitewater forms the western parish boundary. The southern boundary now follows the M3 motorway. At the southern end is the green and with thatched duck house. The pond is called Hatton's Pond, after a landlord of the Waggon and Horses public house in about 1870. The red-brick Church of England parish church of St John the Evangelist overlooks the green.

Beyond the green are the Mildmay oak trees. They were planted at the behest of Lady St John Mildmay in response to a call in 1807 by Admiral Collingwood after the Battle of Trafalgar for landowners to plant oaks to provide timber for naval ships. The cricket green, home of the oldest cricket club in Hampshire, is behind the shops, with a second duckpond and Dutch-gabled farmhouse, Causeway Farm, a short distance away through a stand of oaks.

Elvetham is a hamlet about 1 mile (1.6 km) east of Hartley Wintney. Until the 20th century it was a separate civil parish. Hartfordbridge, about 3/4 mile (1.2 km) northeast of Hartley Wintney, was partly in Elvetham parish and partly in Hartley Wintney.

Hartley Row is a former hamlet within Hartley Wintney. As late as 1969, bus timetables referred to the village as Hartley Row.

=== Nearby towns ===
- Hook – 3 miles (5 km) west
- Fleet – 3 miles (5 km) southeast
- Yateley – 4 miles (6.4 km) northeast
- Sandhurst – 5 miles (8 km) northeast
- Farnborough – 6 miles (10 km) east-southeast
- Camberley – 7 miles (11 km) east-northeast
- Aldershot – 7 1/2 miles (12 km) southeast
- Basingstoke – 8 miles (13 km) west
- Reading – 11 miles (18 km) north
- London (central) – 39 miles (63 km) east-northeast

== Demographics ==
Census population of Hartley Wintney parish
Census	Population	Female	Male	Households	Source
2001	4,843	2,488	2,355	2,047	
2011	4,999	2,584	2,415	2,139	
2021	5,925	3,162	2,763	2,603	

In 1831 the parish (then excluding Elvetham and part of Hartfordbridge) had a population of 1,139.

== Churches ==
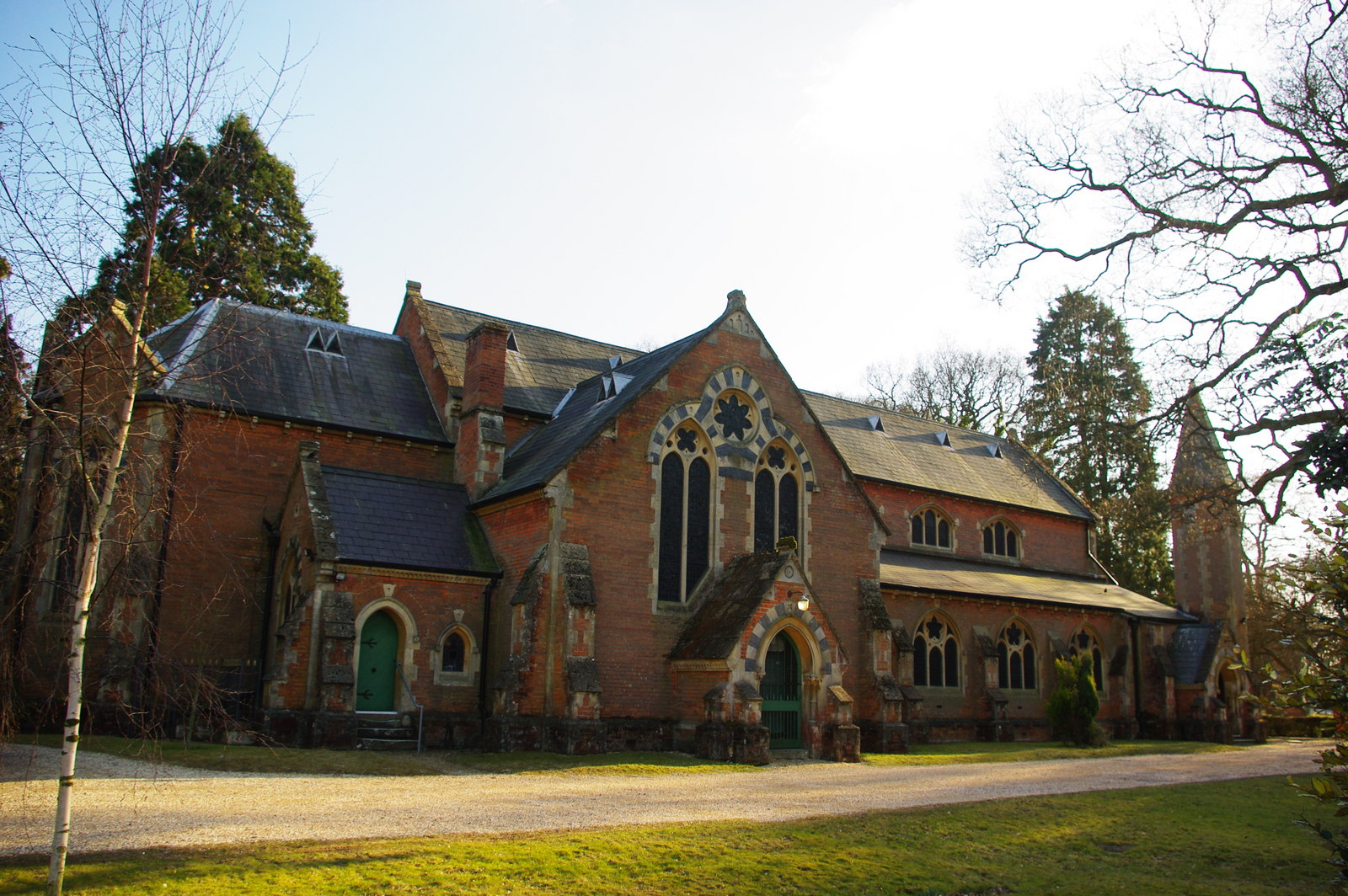
Parish church of St John the Baptist

St Mary's Church, about 2/3 mile (1 km) south of the centre of the village, is Hartley Wintney's original Church of England parish church. It was built in the 13th century and given new windows in the 14th and 15th centuries. In the 19th century the brick transepts and west tower were added and more windows were inserted. St Mary's is a grade II* listed building.

In 1869–70 a new parish church of St John the Evangelist was built nearer the centre of the village. It is a Gothic Revival building designed by EA Lansdowne. In the 20th century the Diocese of Winchester declared St Mary's redundant and vested it in the Churches Conservation Trust, leaving St John's as the parish's sole Anglican place of worship.

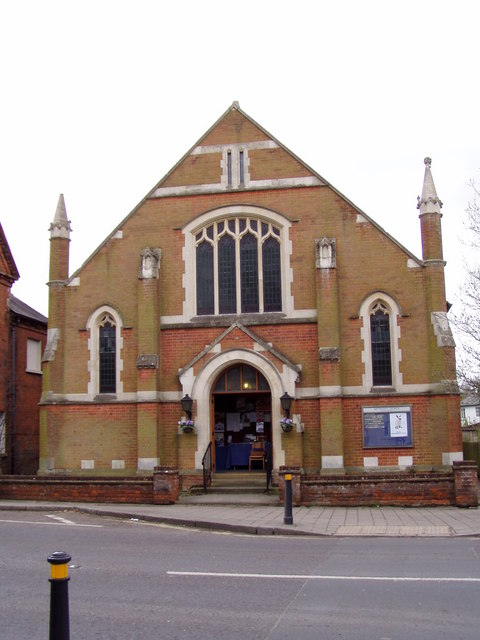
Hartley Wintney Methodist church

The village also has a Baptists Together church, a Methodist church, and a Roman Catholic church dedicated to St Thomas More and built in the 1960s. In 2016, a fire destroyed the roof of the Catholic church.

== Landmarks ==
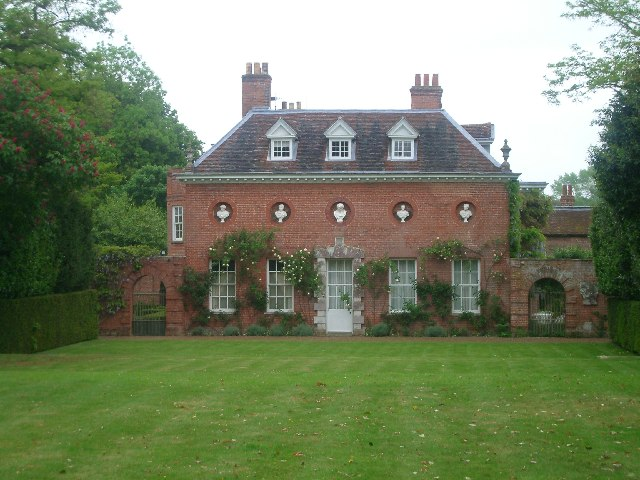
West Green House

- West Green House is an 18th-century country house owned by the National Trust. The gardens are open to the public.
- Victoria Hall, at the west end of Hartley Wintney, was designed by Thomas Edward Collcutt. It was built in 1897 and opened by Lady Calthorpe on 20 October 1898 to celebrate the Golden Jubilee of Queen Victoria. It won the Hart Design Awards best new building award in 2002 for a sensitive restoration and extension.

== Sport and leisure ==
Hartley Wintney F.C. is a Non-League football club that plays at The Memorial Playing Fields.

The village is believed to have one of the oldest continuously used cricket grounds in England. In 2020 the Hartley Wintney Cricket Club celebrated its 250th anniversary.

== Transport ==
The village is on the A30 road at its junction with the A323 Fleet Road, almost equidistant between Basingstoke to the west and Camberley to the east. This was the main trunk road to the West Country and Southampton until 1971, when the M3 motorway was opened.

The nearest railway station is at Winchfield on the South West Main Line. It is about 1 1/2 miles (2.4 km) south of Hartley Wintney and is signposted from the village.

Stagecoach South route 7 runs between Aldershot and Phoenix Green. In addition, route 65X runs between Alton College and Phoenix Green via Hartley Wintney and route 408 runs between Farnborough College of Technology and Odiham via Hartley Wintney during term time. Hartley Wintney Community Bus Service runs a regularly weekday commuter service to Winchfield railway station and services to Hook, Yateley, Frogmore and The Meadows. A Saturday service goes to Camberley as well as The Meadows from Hartley Wintney, via Yateley and Frogmore.

== Notable residents ==
- Field Marshal Alan Brooke (1883–1963), later Viscount Alanbrooke, had his home in the village during the Second World War and continued to live here until his death in 1963. He is buried in St Mary's churchyard, next to his daughter who was killed in a horseriding accident. His younger son, the third Viscount Alanbrooke (1932–2018) lived in the village until his death.
- Matthew Bennett (historian), a historian specialising in Medieval warfare and former Senior Lecturer in the Department of Communication and Applied Behavioural Science at The Royal Military Academy Sandhurst, is a long-term village resident.
- Richard C. Davis, originator of the American television programme Flip This House, rents a farm in Hartley Wintney. The programme focused on the process of buying, remodelling, and selling houses for profit.
- Lieutenant-General Henry Hawley (died 1759), the infamous butcher at the Battle of Culloden, lived at West Green House and is buried in the family vault beneath St Mary's Church.
- Thomas Howard (1781–1864), Hampshire county cricketer, lived all his life at Hartley Wintney.
- Admiral Sir William Milbourne James was born in the village in 1881.
- Henry Kirkwood (1886–1954), first-class cricketer and British Army officer.
- William Lethaby (1857–1931), architect and architectural historian, is buried in St Mary's parish churchyard.
- Philip Scrutton (1923–1958), leading English amateur golfer, died in a road traffic accident in Hartley Wintney on 30 October 1958 aged 35.
- William Lowe (1873–1945), cricketer for Cambridge University and Worcestershire, died in Hartley Wintney.
- Claude Myburgh (1911–1987), cricketer and soldier, lived for his latter years at Inholmes Court.
- Admiral Sir Richard Onslow (1904–1975) lived in Hartley Wintney at Bears Barn in the latter part of his naval career.
- Justin Rose (born 1980), 2013 US Open golf champion, was at one time a member of the local golf course.
- Sir Benjamin Rudyerd (1572–1658), politician and poet, grew up in Hartley Wintney.
- Spencer Wilks (1891–1971), president of the Rover Company and Maurice Wilks (1904–1963), Chairman of the Rover Company.
- Adrian Stoop (1883–1957), Rugby union player for Harlequins and England, lived at The Grange in Hartley Wintney.
- Gerald Tuck (1902–1984), cricketer and Royal Navy officer.

== Bibliography ==
- Gorsky, David. The Old Village of Hartley Wintney. Hartley Wintney: Hartley Wintney Preservation Society.
- Lewis, Samuel, ed. (1931) [1848]. A Topographical Dictionary of England (Seventh ed.). London: Samuel Lewis. pp. 421–427.
- Page, WH, ed. (1911). A History of the County of Hampshire. Victoria County History. Vol. 4. Westminster: Archibald Constable & Co. pp. 74–76, 79–81.
- Pevsner, Nikolaus; Lloyd, David (1967). Hampshire and the Isle of Wight. The Buildings of England. Harmondsworth: Penguin Books. pp. 274–275.
