= William Lowe (cricketer) =

English cricketer

William Walter Lowe (17 November 1873 – 26 May 1945) was an English first-class cricketer. He was a Cambridge University and Worcestershire all-rounder who bowled right-arm fast and batted right-handed, generally in the lower middle order.

== Life and career ==
Born in Stamford, Lincolnshire, the sixth son of John Rooe Lowe and his wife Mary Ann Laws, Lowe was educated at Malvern College and Pembroke College, Cambridge. He then returned to Malvern as an assistant master, becoming later a house master. He taught at Malvern from 1896 to 1932.

Lowe died in Hartley Wintney, Hampshire, at the age of 71.

== Cricket ==
Lowe made his first-class debut for Cambridge against Somerset in 1895. He finished the English season with 309 runs at 30.90 and 31 wickets at 25.32, including 5–48 in the University Match against Oxford University, and was invited to join F Mitchell's XI on a tour of North America that autumn. It was while there that Lowe recorded his best bowling figures, taking 6–15 against the Philadelphians.

On his return to England, Lowe played three times for Cambridge in 1896, but was then out of the game until August 1899 when he joined Worcestershire in the county's maiden first-class season. The highlight of his summer was undoubtedly the unbeaten 102 he hit against Derbyshire, when he added 87 in barely half an hour with Robert Burrows for the ninth wicket to set up a crushing innings win, one of only two County Championship wins by the county all season.

The following year Lowe made ten appearances for Worcestershire, passing 500 first-class runs for the only time in his career, and in 1901 he averaged nearly 42 with the bat and made his highest score of 154 against Leicestershire; the innings took only 150 minutes and remains (as of 2009) the highest score for Worcestershire in first-class cricket for a man batting at seven. However, his form trailed off and after 1902 he dropped out of the first-class game, though he did have a brief and unsuccessful comeback in 1910 and 1911; his only wicket in his last year being that of Test all-rounder Len Braund.

== Association football ==
Lowe played soccer for the Corinthian Football Club, from 1895 to 1900. In other sports, he was noted also for golf and skating.
