= Gerald Tuck =

English cricketer and Royal Navy officer

Captain Gerald Tuck DSO
- Born: Gerald Seymour Tuck; 5 May 1902; Hartley Wintney, Hampshire, England
- Died: 27 July 1984 (aged 82); Chichester, Sussex, England
- Cricket career

Cricket information
- Batting: Right-handed

Domestic team information
- Years: Team
- 1928: Northumberland

Career statistics
Competition	First-class
Matches	6
Runs scored	314
Batting average	31.40
100s/50s	1/2
Top score	125
Catches/stumpings	3/–
- Source: Cricinfo, 18 June 2019

Gerald Seymour Tuck DSO (5 May 1902 – 27 July 1984) was a Royal Navy officer and English first-class cricketer. He served in the Royal Navy from 1922–1951, seeing action in the Second World War and reaching the rank of captain. He also played first-class cricket for the Royal Navy.

== Naval career and first-class cricket ==
Tuck was born at Hartley Wintney in May 1902. He was commissioned into the Royal Navy prior to August 1923, when he was promoted to the rank of sub-lieutenant. He was promoted to the rank of lieutenant in February 1924. He made his debut in first-class cricket for the Royal Navy against the touring New Zealanders at Portsmouth in 1927. He scored a century on debut, making 125 runs in the Royal Navy second-innings total of 275 all out. He made five further first-class appearances for the Royal Navy, with his final appearance coming against the Royal Air Force at Chatham in 1929. In six first-class matches, Tuck scored 314 runs at an average of 31.40, with a high score of 125. He appeared in minor counties cricket for Northumberland in 1928, making a single appearance in the Minor Counties Championship against Durham.

He was promoted to the rank of lieutenant commander in February 1932, followed by promotion to the rank of commander in June 1936. He served in the navy in the Second World War, during which he was awarded the Distinguished Service Order in June 1941 while serving aboard HMS Illustrious. Having served as acting captain aboard HMS California from October 1941, he was promoted to the rank to the full rank of captain in December 1941. He served as captain aboard HMS Bellona from November 1944 to July 1946. He retired from active service in April 1951.

He died at Chichester in July 1984, at the age of 82.
