= Governor of Fort William =

Former British Army office

The Governor of Fort William was a British Army officer who commanded the garrison at Fort William in Inverness-shire. The office became a sinecure and was abolished in 1833.

== Governors of Fort William ==
- 1691: Colonel Hill
- 1725: Charles Sibourg
- 1733: George Wade (also Governor of Fort George and Fort Augustus)
- 1743: Humphrey Bland
- 1752: Richard Onslow
- 1759: William Kingsley
- 1769: John Burgoyne
- 1779: John Vaughan
- 1780: James Murray
- 1794: William Harcourt
- 1795: Edmund Stevens

== Lieutenant-Governors of Fort William ==
- ... Campbell
- 1752: John Leighton
- 1764–1804: James Forbes, 16th Lord Forbes
- 1804–1812: Donald Macdonald
- 1812: Sir James Kempt
