= Robert Gay (MP) =

English surgeon and politician

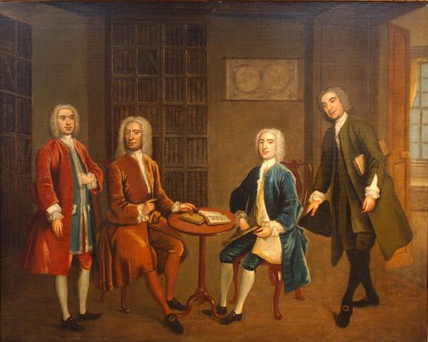
Four Bath Worthies. From left Richard Jones (clerk of works at Prior Park), Ralph Allen, Robert Gay, and John Wood the Elder

Robert Gay FRS (c. 1676–1738), of Hatton Garden, Middlesex and Walcot, Bath, was an English surgeon and politician who sat in the House of Commons between 1720 and 1734.

Gay entered Jesus College, Cambridge in 1693. He married Mary Saunders, daughter of William Saunders of London in 1699 and by a marriage settlement of 17 June, Saunders conveyed to him Walcot Manor on the outskirts of Bath. He married secondly, by 1708, Margaret Farmer, the daughter of Sir Edward Farmer of Canons in Great Parndon, Essex.

Gay was appointed Assistant Surgeon annually at St Bartholomew's Hospital, London from 1708 to 1719 and was raised to surgeon there from 1719 to 1729. He also acted as Treasurer at Christ's Hospital School. He was elected a Fellow of the Royal Society in 1718.

Gay was elected Member of Parliament (MP) for Bath at a by-election on 22 February 1720 but was defeated at the 1722 general election. He was re-elected MP for Bath at the 1727 general election but did not stand in 1734.

Gay leased to John Wood the Elder the land of Barton Farm in the Walcot estate for the building of Queen Square, Bath and for Gay Street, Bath, which was thereby named after him. Wood had been anxious to build in such style from 1725 but the Corporation and other bodies had impeded his attempts to build in the city.

Gay died on 31 October 1738. He had a son and two daughters. The Walcot estate passed to his daughter Margaret by his second wife.

Parliament of Great Britain
Preceded by Samuel Trotman; John Codrington	Member of Parliament for Bath; 1720–1722; With: John Codrington	Succeeded by General George Wade; John Codrington
Preceded by General George Wade; John Codrington	Member of Parliament for Bath; 1727–1734; With: General George Wade	Succeeded by General George Wade; John Codrington
