= Governor of Upnor Castle =

The Governor of Upnor Castle was a military officer who commanded the fortifications at Upnor Castle, part of the defenses of the Medway estuary. Upnor became largely obsolete as a fortress after 1668, but it continued to serve as a magazine and ordnance facility until 1945.

== Governors of Upnor ==
- ?–1694: Robert Mynors Esq.
- 1695–1696: Sir Thomas Taylor, 2nd Baronet
- 1697: Edward Rouse
- ?–1711: Edward Hastings
- 1711–1733: John Webb
- bef. 1756–1775: William Deane
- 1775–1778: James Murray
- 1778–1784: William Brown
- 1784–1796: Paulus Aemilius Irving
- 1796–1815: Jeffrey Amherst
- 1816–1835: Alexander Lawrence
