= Charles Sybourg =

British Army general

Lieutenant-General Charles Sybourg (born Charles de Sibourg; died 25 January 1733) was a British Army officer.

Sybourg was a gentleman of French Protestant extraction, and was said to have been an illegitimate son of Meinhardt, Duke of Schomberg. He entered the English army soon after the Revolution of 1688, and proved a brave and meritorious officer. On 1 May 1694 he was promoted to the rank of major in Schomberg's 8th Horse (later 7th Dragoon Guards), and on 1 March 1703 was appointed to the lieutenant-colonelcy of the regiment, from which time he discontinued the de in his name, which was afterwards spelt Sybourg. He was granted the brevet rank as a colonel of Horse on 1 January 1704. He commanded the 8th Horse at the battles of Schellenberg, Blenheim and Ramillies, and was promoted to the rank of brigader-general on 1 January 1707. In 1708 he commanded a brigade of cuirassiers at the battle of Oudenarde, and he was also present at Malplaquet the following year. On 1 January 1710 he was promoted to the rank of major-general, and he succeeded the Earl of Orrery in the colonelcy of a newly raised regiment of foot on 8 December. He commanded a brigade under the Duke of Marlborough during the campaign of 1711. Following the decease of the Marquess of Harwich, on 12 October 1713 he obtained the colonelcy of the 8th Horse, which he retained until 1720. In April 1725 he was made governor of Fort William in Scotland, and it was reported that he amassed a fortune of £80,000. He died on 25 January 1733, and was buried in Westminster Abbey.

Military offices
Preceded by The Earl of Orrery	Colonel of Sybourg's Regiment of Foot; 1710–1713	Succeeded by John Corbet
Preceded by Marquess of Harwich	Colonel of the 8th Regiment of Horse; 1713–1720	Succeeded by John Ligonier
