= 7th Dragoon Guards =

British military unit

7th Dragoon Guards (Princess Royal's)
- Regimental Badge
- Active: 1688–1922
- Country: England (1688–1707) Great Britain (1707–1746, 1788–1800); Ireland (1746–1788) United Kingdom (1801–1922)
- Branch: British Army
- Type: Cavalry
- Role: Heavy Cavalry
- Size: 550
- Nicknames: The Black Horse; The Virgin Mary's Bodyguard
- March: (slow) 7th (Princess Royal's) Dragoon Guards

Commanders
- Current commander: Defunct

The 7th (The Princess Royal's) Dragoon Guards was a cavalry regiment in the British Army, first raised in 1688 as Lord Cavendish's Regiment of Horse. It was renamed as the 8th Horse in 1694 and the 7th (The Princess Royal's) Dragoon Guards for Princess Charlotte in 1788. It saw service for two centuries, including the First World War, before being amalgamated with the 4th Royal Irish Dragoon Guards, to form the 4th/7th Dragoon Guards in 1922.

== History ==
c. 1751 painting of a regimental private

During the 1688 Glorious Revolution, William Cavendish, later Duke of Devonshire, raised a troop of horse to provide an escort for Princess Anne, younger daughter of James II. After James fled into exile, a number of independent troops were brought together to form Lord Cavendish's Regiment of Horse.

During the Williamite War in Ireland, it fought at the Battle of the Boyne in July 1690, before moving to Flanders in 1692 to serve in the Nine Years' War. It took part in the action at Dottignies in July 1693 and the siege of Namur in July 1695, before the war ended with the 1697 Treaty of Ryswick. Saved from disbandment by being transferred onto the Irish establishment, it served in Europe throughout the War of the Spanish Succession, fighting at Blenheim, Elixheim, Ramillies and Malplaquet.

After the 1713 Treaty of Utrecht it returned to Ireland, where in 1720, French Huguenot exile and future Field Marshal John Ligonier took over as colonel, a position he held for 29 years. Under his command, the unit gained a reputation as one of the best trained and efficient units in the British army; between 1742 and 1747, 37 members of the regiment received battlefield commissions for distinguished service, a record 'without parallel for the period.' As late as 1913, recruits were still taught about Ligonier, while his personal crest and motto were borne by every member of the regiment.

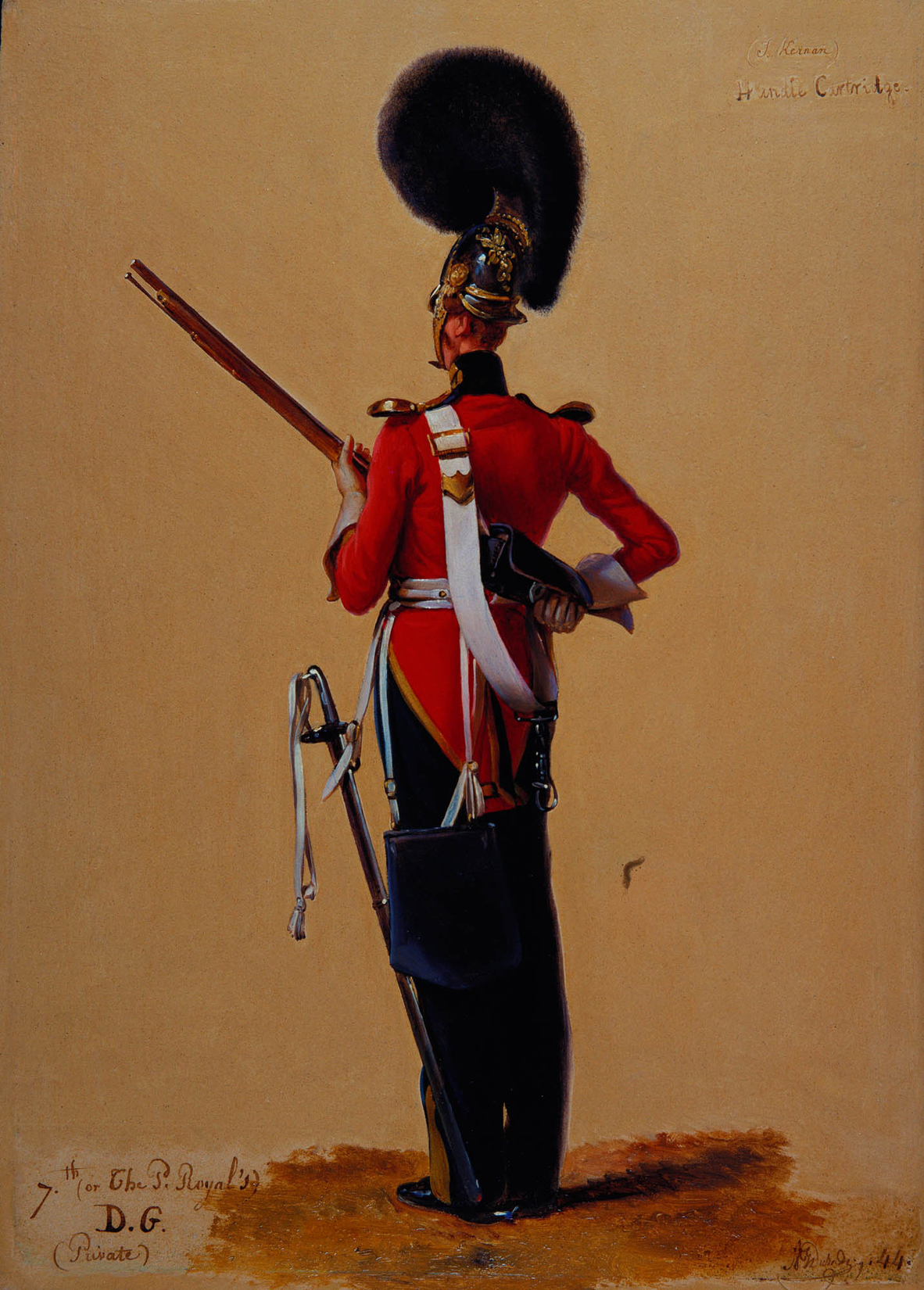
1832 painting of a regimental private

Sent back to Flanders in 1742 for the War of the Austrian Succession, the regiment fought in the battles of Dettingen and Fontenoy. At Lauffeld in July 1747, it took part in a famous charge led by Ligonier that allowed their infantry to escape what was an Allied defeat. After the 1748 Treaty of Aix-la-Chapelle, it returned to garrison duty in Ireland. In the army reforms of 1747, it was ranked as the 4th Regiment of Horse, or the "Black Horse". It remained in Ireland until July 1760, when it fought at Warburg, during the Seven Years' War.

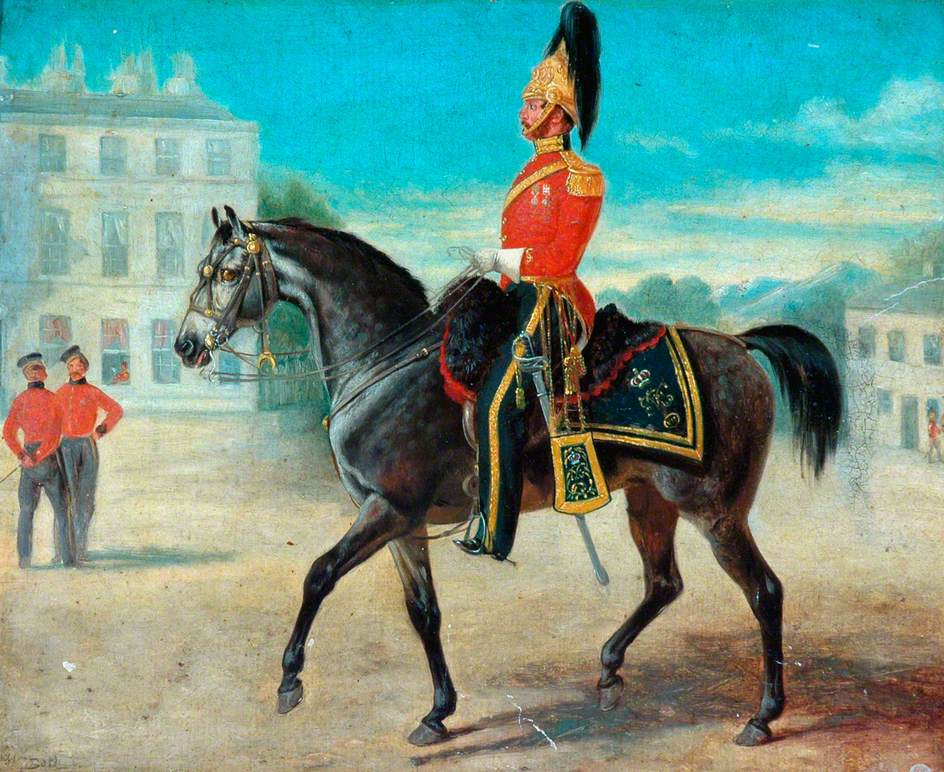
c. 1850 painting of a regimental major

In 1788, it was retitled 7th (The Princess Royal's) Dragoon Guards, after Princess Charlotte. It remained in Ireland and England throughout the wars with France and helped suppress the 1798 Irish Rebellion. During the Victorian era, it was sent to South Africa in 1843, where it remained until after the 1846–1847 Xhosa War. Before leaving, the regiment was rearmed with a version of the Brunswick rifle: despite the shortcomings of this weapon, it dismounted to fight as infantry so frequently that on its return to England the Inspector-General of Cavalry recommended that additional infantry officers be drafted into the regiment. In 1857, it was posted to India, returning home in 1867 where it remained until the 1882 Anglo-Egyptian War.

Following the outbreak of the Second Boer War in late 1899, the regiment was again sent abroad for service in South Africa. A total of 24 officers and 500 men left Southampton aboard Armenian on 8 February 1900. The regiment fought at the Battle of Diamond Hill in June 1900.

The regiment, which had been serving in Secunderabad at the start of the First World War, landed in Marseille as part of the 9th (Secunderabad) Cavalry Brigade in the 1st Indian Cavalry Division in October 1914 for service on the Western Front. A squadron from the regiment rode ten miles to capture the town of Lessines on 11 November 1918 shortly before the armistice. It was re-titled as the 7th Dragoon Guards (Princess Royal's) in 1921, and was amalgamated with the 4th Royal Irish Dragoon Guards, to form the 4th/7th Dragoon Guards in 1922.

== Regimental museum ==
The regimental collection is held in the York Army Museum at the Tower Street drill hall in York.

== Battle honours ==
The regiment's battle honours were as follows:

- Early Wars: Blenheim, Ramillies, Oudenarde, Malplaquet, Dettingen, Warburg, South Africa 1846–7, Tel-el-Kebir, Egypt 1882, South Africa 1900–02
- The Great War: La Bassée 1914, Givenchy 1914, Somme 1916 '18, Bazentin, Flers-Courcelette, Cambrai 1917 '18, St. Quentin, Avre, Lys, Hazebrouck, Amiens, Hindenburg Line, St. Quentin Canal, Beaurevoir, Pursuit to Mons, France and Flanders 1914–18

== Memorials ==
In Norwich Cathedral there are memorial windows to those members of the 7th Dragoon Guards who died in the Second Boer War and World War I. Under the Boer War window there is a pair of brass plates listing 64 names, as well as the laid-up standards of the regiment. Under the WWI window the brass plates list 120 names. An added plate underneath is inscribed 'In Memory of the Officers, Warrant Officers, Non-Commissioned Officers and Troopers of the 4th/7th Royal Dragoon Guards who fell in the Second World War'.

== Colonels ==
The colonels of the regiment were as follows:

9th Regiment of Horse

- 1688 Col. William, Lord Cavendish —Lord Cavendish's Regiment of Horse
- 1690 Gen. Meinhardt, Duke of Leinster —Duke of Leinster's Regiment of Horse

from 1693 8th Regiment of Horse

- 1711 Col. Charles, Marquess of Harwich — Marquess of Harwich's Regiment of Horse
- 1713 Maj-Gen. Charles Sybourg —Sybourg's Regiment of Horse
- 1720 F.M. Sir John Ligonier K B —Ligonier's Regiment of Horse

in 1746 transferred to the Irish establishment and ranked

4th (Irish) Regiment of Horse
Black Horse

- 1749 Gen. Sir John Mordaunt K B — Mordaunt's Regiment of Horse
- 1749 Maj-Gen. Henry de Grangues —de Grangues's Regiment of Horse

On 1 July 1751 a royal warrant provided that in future regiments would not be known by their colonels' names, but by their "number or rank".

- 1754 F.M. Henry Seymour Conway
- 1759 Gen. Philip Honywood
- 1782 F.M. Studholme Hodgson

in 1788 transferred to the British establishment and ranked

7th (The Princess Royal's) Dragoon Guards

- 1789 Gen. Sir Charles Grey KB
- 1795 Lt-Gen. Sir Ralph Abercromby KB
- 1796 Gen. Sir William Medows KB
- 1813 Gen. Richard Rich Wilford
- 1822 Lt-Gen. Robert Bolton KCH
- 1836 Gen. Sir Evan Lloyd, KCH
- 1846 Gen. Sir George Scovell, GCB
- 1847 Gen. Hon. Sir Henry Murray, KCB
- 1853 Lt-Gen. Arthur Hill, 2nd Baron Sandys
- 1858 Lt-Gen. Sir Michael White, KCB
- 1868 Gen. Lord George Augustus Frederick Paget, KCB
- 1874 Gen. Robert Wardlaw, CB
- 1885 Lt-Gen. Charles Sawyer
- 1891 Lt-Gen. Edward Burgoyne Cuerton
- 1892 Lt-Gen. Andrew Nugent
- 1900–1922 Sir Henry Peter Ewart (to 4th/7th Dragoon Guards)

from 1921 7th Dragoon Guards (Princess Royal's)

from 1922 4th/7th Dragoon Guards after amalgamation with 4th Royal Irish Dragoon Guards

== See also ==
- British cavalry during the First World War

== Sources ==
- Buchanan, Brenda (1999). Sir John (later Lord) Ligonier in Bath History. Millstream Books. ISBN 978-0948975516.
- Cannon, Richard (1839). Historical Record of the 7th (Princess Royal's Regiment) of Dragoons. Longman, Orme & Co.
- Wood, Stephen (2004). Ligonier, John [formerly Jean-Louis de Ligonier], Earl Ligonier (Online ed.). Oxford DNB. doi:10.1093/ref:odnb/16653.
