= Governor of Inverness =

The Governor of Inverness or Governor of Fort George and Fort Augustus was a British Army officer who commanded the garrisons at Fort George and Fort Augustus in Inverness-shire. The office became a sinecure and was abolished in 1833.

The role of Governor was an honorary title, and well paid, although the Governor was not expected to reside at the fort.

The Lieutenant Governor was the senior officer permanently stationed at the garrison. At Fort George, the Lieutenant Governor's residence was three storeys and afforded all of the amenities of an aristocratic town house. This building is now used for the Regimental Museum of the Queen’s Own Highlanders.

== Governors of Fort George and Fort Augustus ==
- 1725: Jasper Clayton
- 1733: George Wade (also Governor of Fort William)
- 1748: Henry Hawley
- 1752: Sir Charles Howard
- 1765: Studholme Hodgson
- 1798: Sir Ralph Abercromby
- 1801: Sir David Dundas
- 1804: William Dalrymple
- 1804: Alexander Ross
- 1827: Sir David Baird, 1st Baronet
- 1829: Sir George Murray

== Lieutenant Governors of Fort George ==
- 1767: Peter Parr

== Deputy Governors of Fort George ==
- James Cunningham
- 1736: William Kennedy
- 1743: George Grant
- c.1747: William Caulfeild
- 1767: Charles Beauclerk
- 1774: Alexander Campbell
- 1779: John Campbell
- 1790: Sir Robert Sinclair
- 1795: James Stewart
- 1808: James Robertson
- 1811: Alexander Mair

== Deputy Governors of Fort Augustus ==
- 1753: Alexander Trapaud
- 1796: George Brodie
- 1812: Archibald Campbell
