= William Blathwayt =

English diplomat and politician

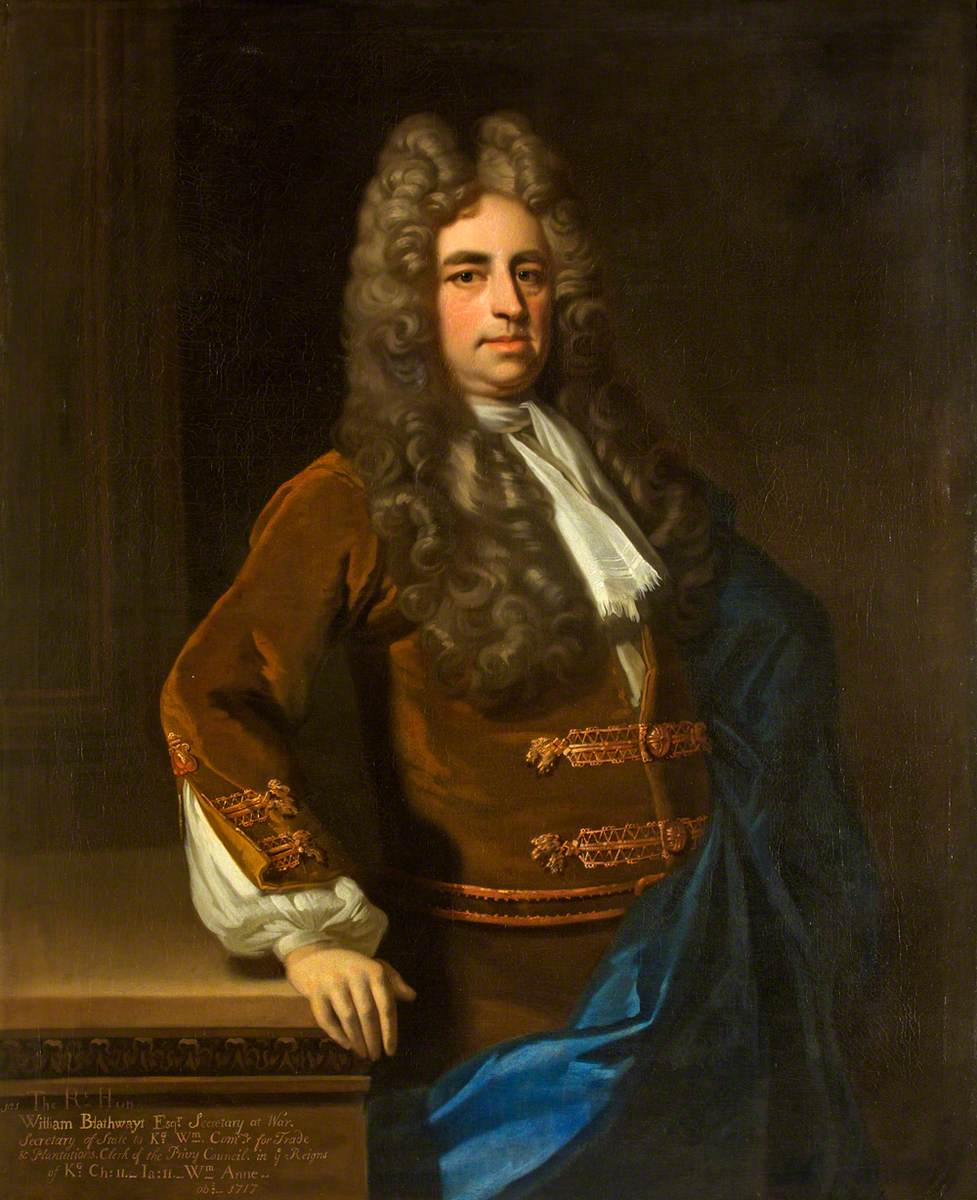
- Portrait by Michael Dahl, c. 1689–1691

Secretary at War
- In office August 1683 – 1704
- Monarch: James II
- Preceded by: Matthew Locke
- Succeeded by: George Clarke

Member of Parliament for Bath
- In office 1707–1710 Serving with Samuel Trotman
- Preceded by: Parliament of England
- Succeeded by: Samuel Trotman; John Codrington
- In office 1693–1707 Serving with Joseph Langton, Sir Thomas Estcourt, Alexander Popham, Samuel Trotman
- Preceded by: Sir William Bassett; Joseph Langton
- Succeeded by: Parliament of Great Britain

Personal details
- Born: c. March 1649 St Botolph's, Aldersgate, London
- Died: 16 August 1717 (aged 68) Dyrham Park, Dyrham
- Spouse: Mary Wynter (m. 1686; died 1691)
- Relations: Justinian Povey (grandfather); Thomas Povey (uncle)
- Children: William Blathwayt; John Blathwayt; Anne Blathwayt Southwell
- Parent(s): William Blathwayt; Anne Povey
- Education: Brasenose College, Oxford

William Blathwayt (or Blathwayte) (1649 – 16 August 1717) was an English diplomat, public official and Whig politician who sat in the English and British House of Commons between 1685 and 1710. He established the War Office as a department of the British Government and played an important part in administering the English (later British) colonies of North America.

== Early life ==
Blathwayt was born at St Botolph's, Aldersgate and baptized in the parish of St Martin-in-the-Fields in London on 2 March 1649, the only son of William Blathwayt, barrister, of the Middle Temple, and Anne Povey, daughter of Justinian Povey of Hounslow, Middlesex, who was accountant-general to Queen Anne of Denmark. He was born to a well-to-do family of Protestant merchants and lawyers. After his father's death, his mother remarried Thomas Vivian, of the prominent Cornish family. In 1665 he was admitted at Middle Temple.

== Career ==
Blathwayt joined the diplomatic service in 1668 when his uncle Thomas Povey, an influential London lawyer, found him a post as Clerk of the English embassy at The Hague. He followed this in 1672 with a year as Clerk of Embassy at Copenhagen and Stockholm. From 1672 to 1673 he travelled in Sweden, Germany, Italy, Switzerland and France and in the course of his tour, he studied at Padua University.

Blathwayt returned to London in the early 1670s, and was assistant secretary of trade and plantations from 1675 to 1679. He became a Clerk of the Privy Council in Extraordinary in 1678 and in 1679 was promoted to secretary of trade and plantations. Also in 1679, he was considered "as a very fit person" to be assistant to the secretary of the council, being heavily involved in the administration of England's colonies in North America. In 1680, he became the first surveyor and auditor-general of royal revenues in America. He became under-secretary of state (north) in 1681 until he obtained the office of Secretary at War.

=== Secretary at War ===
In 1683, he purchased the office of Secretary at War which he held to February 1689. His role as Secretary at War was originally merely the role of secretary to the Commander-in-Chief of the British Army but under Blathwayt the remit of the Secretary was greatly expanded to encompass all areas of Army administration. He effectively established the War Office as a department of the government, although he had very little input into the actual conduct of wars. Issues of strategic policy during wartime were managed by the Northern and Southern Departments (the predecessors of today's Foreign Office and Home Office respectively).

=== Political career ===
At the 1685 English general election Blathwayt was returned as Member of Parliament for Newtown in the government interest. He was not active in the Parliament, and was appointed to only one committee to examine the disbandment accounts.

In October 1686, Blathwayt became a Clerk of the Privy Council in Ordinary. He became the secretary of the Privy Council's committee on trade and foreign plantations — in effect, colonial under-secretary. It was in this capacity that he became a key figure in American affairs. He was responsible for establishing the charter of the Crown colony of the Province of Massachusetts Bay, the predecessor of the state of Massachusetts. He did much to promote trade in America and benefited considerably from gifts and bribes received in connection with his office (as was the usual practice in his day). His rise was noted by many of his contemporaries; the diarist John Evelyn commended him as "very dexterous in business" and as one who had "raised himself by his industry from very moderate circumstances."

Blathwayt was a witness for the prosecution at the Trial of the Seven Bishops in 1688 and he lost the politically sensitive post as secretary at war after the Glorious Revolution. He was restored to the post in May 1689 and held it to 1704.

Blathwayt was returned as a Whig Member of Parliament for Bath in 1693 and held the seat until 1710. He was appointed Lord of Trade in 1696, holding the post until 1707.

Blathwayt retired to Dyrham in 1710 (his wife had died in 1691), remaining there until his death.

== Personal life ==
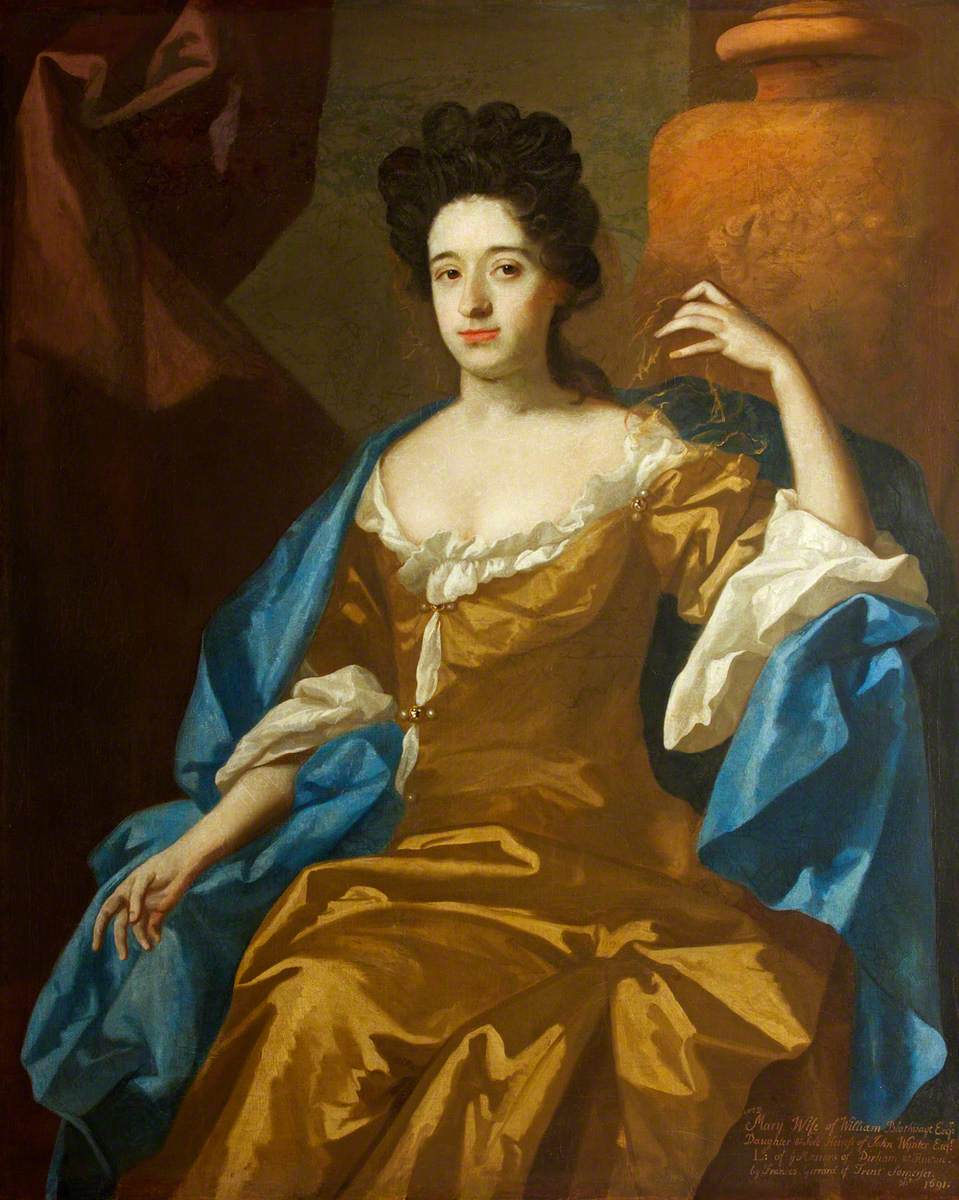
Portrait of his wife, Mary Wynter, by Michael Dahl, between c. 1689 and c. 1691

On 23 December 1686, he married Mary Wynter (1650–1691), daughter of John Wynter of Dyrham Park and the former Frances Gerrard. Before her death in 1691, they were the parents of four sons and one daughter, including:

- William Blathwayt (1688–1742), who married Thomasine Ambrose, a daughter of Jonathan Ambrose of London, in 1718.
- John Blathwayt (1690–1754), a talented musician during his time in Italy; after his return to England, he joined the military, became a Colonel and fought at the Battle of Culloden in 1746.
- Anne Blathwayt (1691–1717), who married, as his second wife, Edward Southwell Sr., the Principal Secretary of State for Ireland who was a son, and heir, of diplomat Sir Robert Southwell of Kings Weston. Southwell was previously married to Elizabeth Cromwell, 8th Baroness Cromwell, who died in 1709.

Blathwayt died at Dyrham on 16 August 1717 and was buried in the local churchyard.

=== Art collection ===
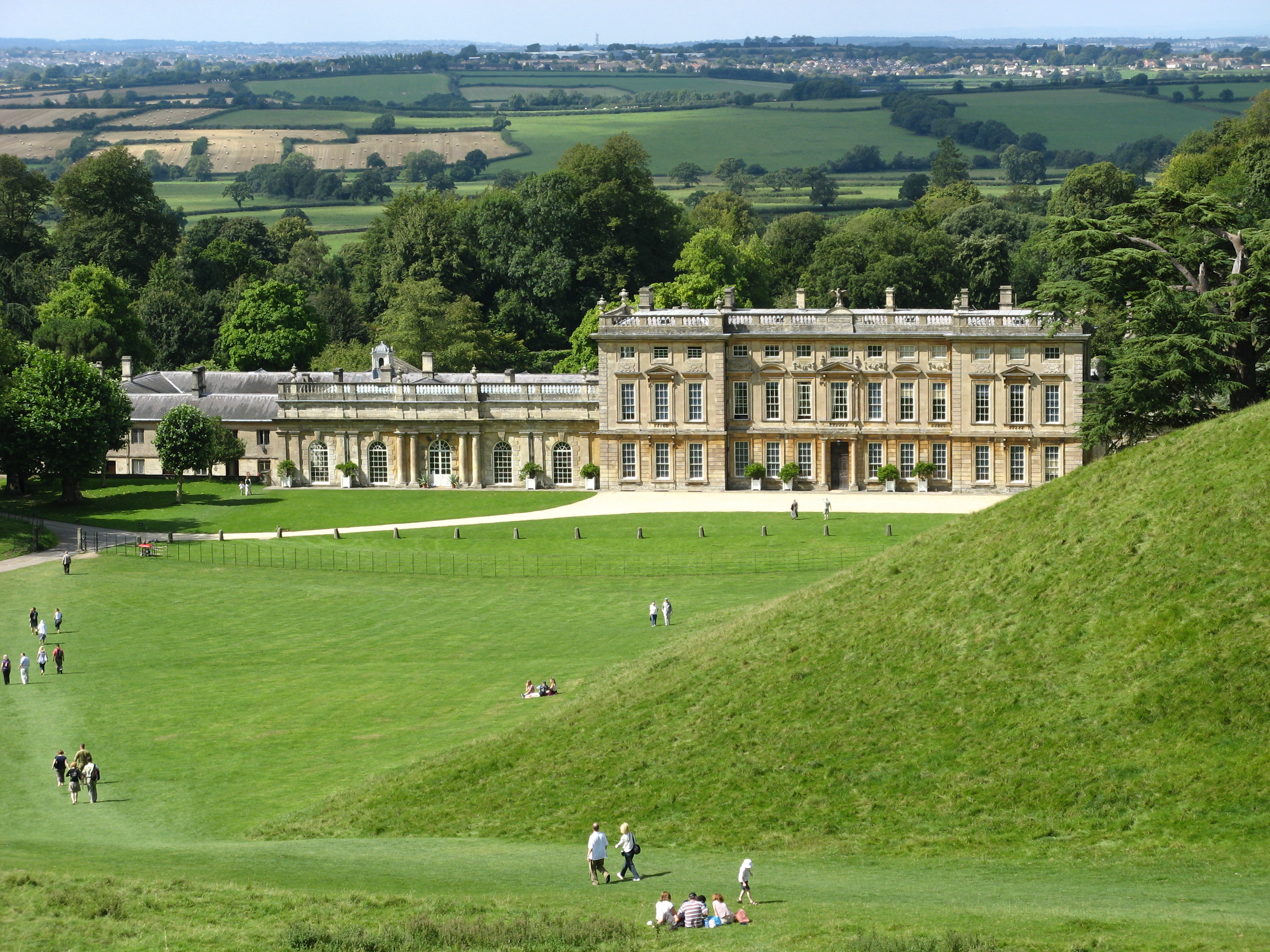
Dyrham Park

Blathwayt built a large mansion house for himself at Dyrham Park near Bristol, which he decorated with numerous Dutch Old Masters and sumptuous fabrics and furnishings. His descendants sold a large part of his art collection in 1765, but some of the paintings have been purchased back or remain at Dyrham Park. Dyrham Park is today in the care of the National Trust and is open to visitors.

=== Descendants ===
Through his son William, he was a grandfather of William Blathwayt (1719–1787), who married three times: to Penelope Jenkinson; Elizabeth Clarke and Mary Creighton of London. Among his numerous descendants were Robert Wynter Blathwayt (1850–1936), who inherited Dyrham Park in 1909 and married Margaret Ermentrude Chandos-Pole-Gell (a daughter of Henry Chandos Pole Gell of Hopton Hall).

He was also the ancestor of Lt. Col. Linley Wynter Blathwayt (1839–1919), the head of a cadet branch of the Blathwayt family who lived at Eagle House in Somerset. He was married to his first cousin, suffragette Emily Blathwayt, and they were the parents of Mary Blathwayt.

== Gallery ==
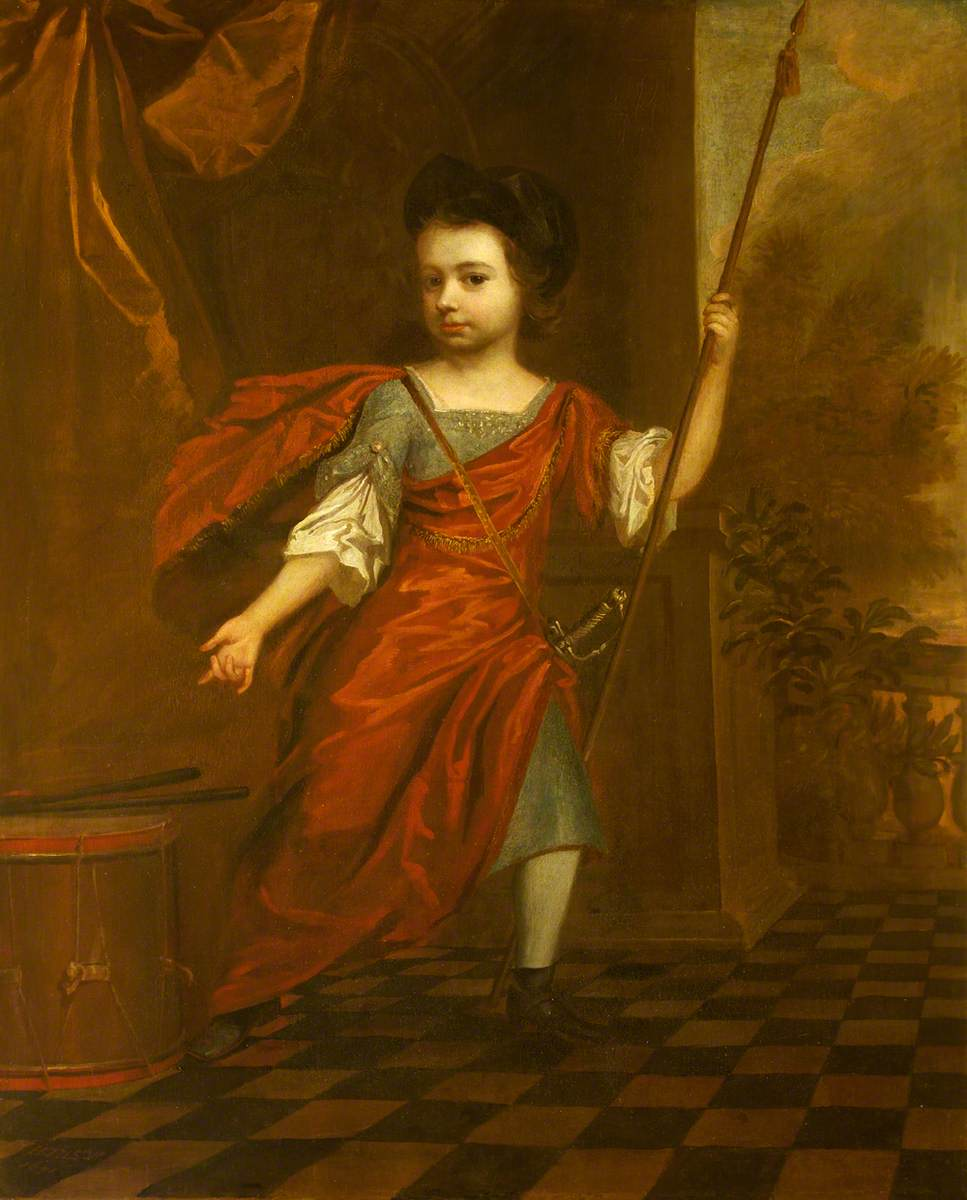
Portrait of his son, William, as a child, by Henry Tilson, 1691

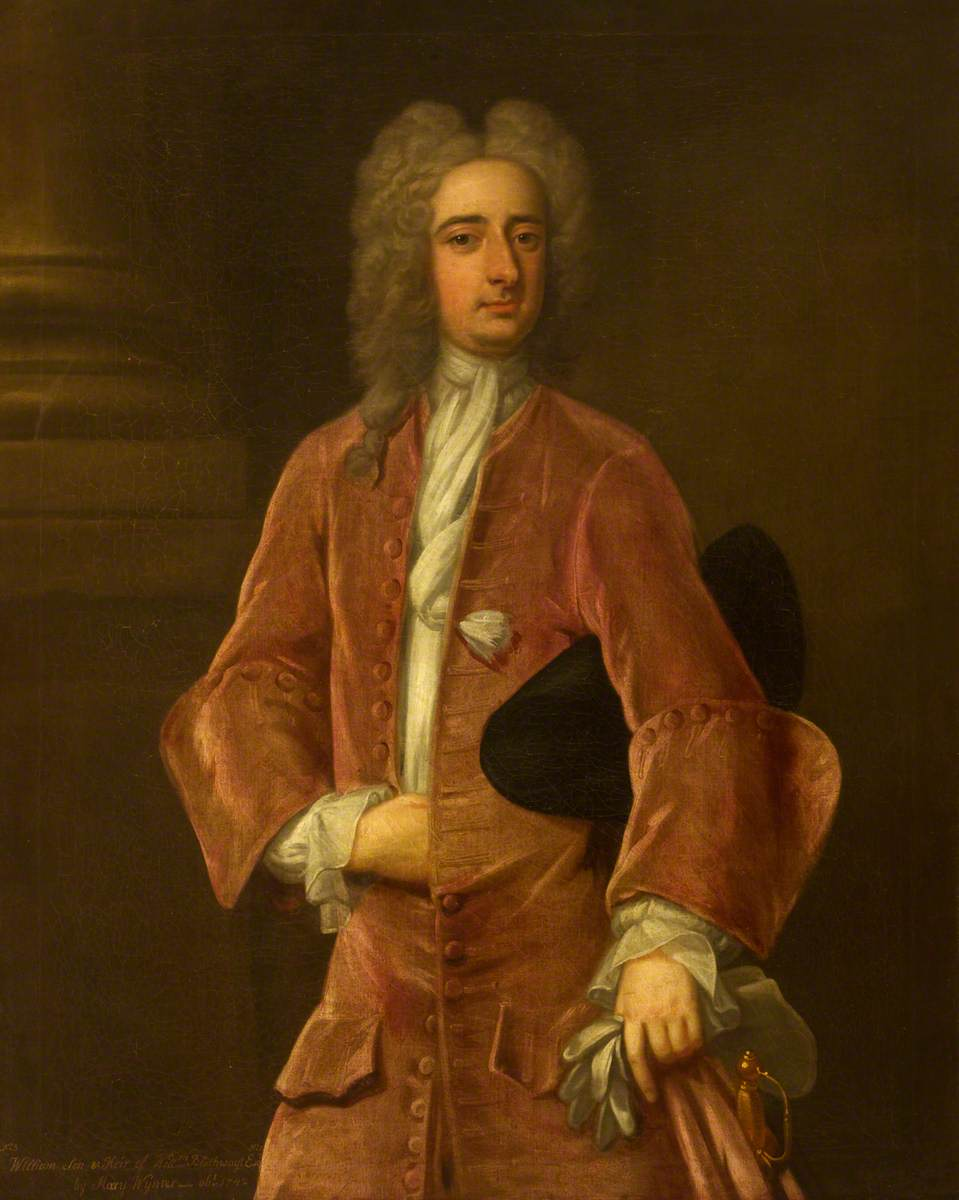
Portrait of his son, William, by Enoch Seeman, between c. 1720 and c. 1729

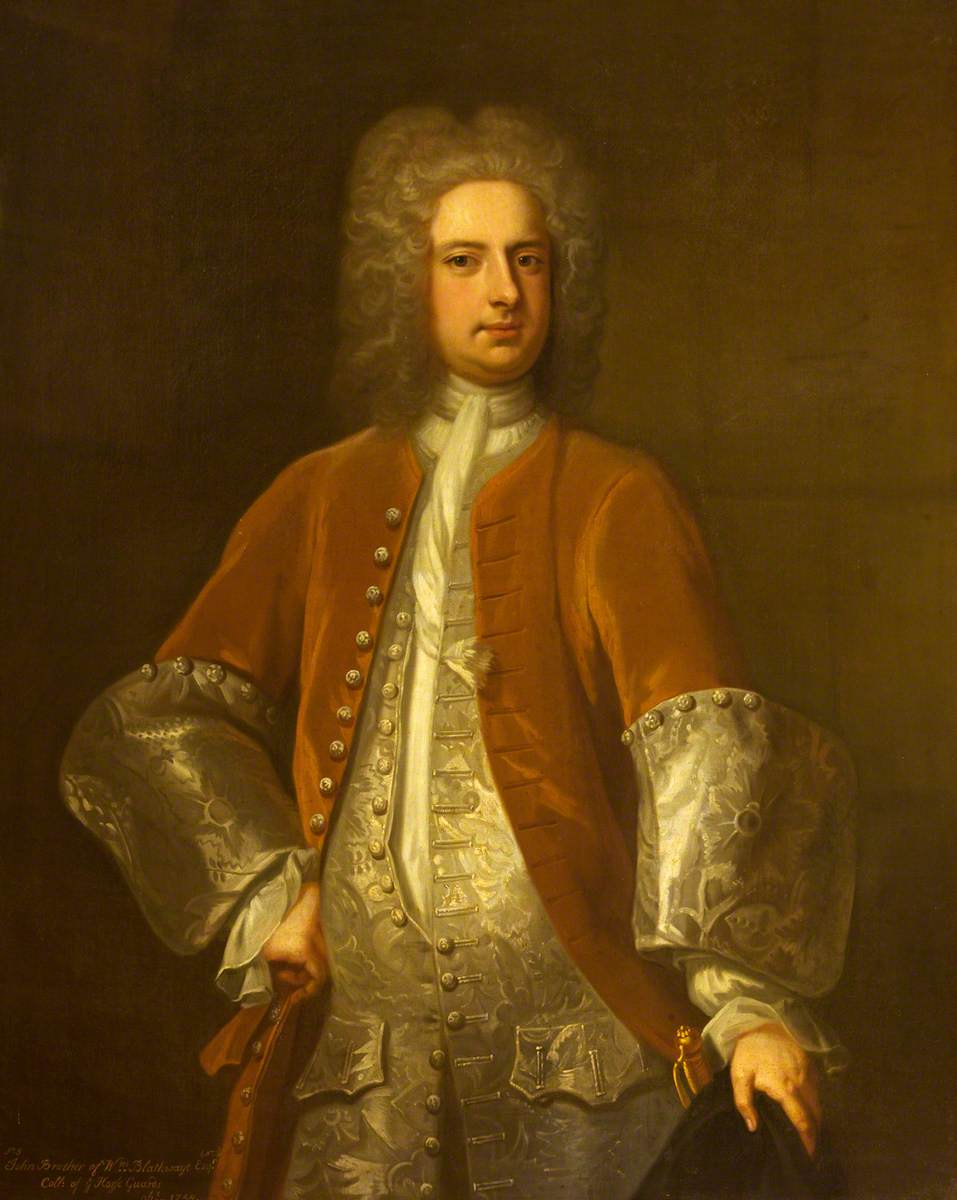
Portrait of his son, John, by Enoch Seeman, between c. 1720 and c. 1729

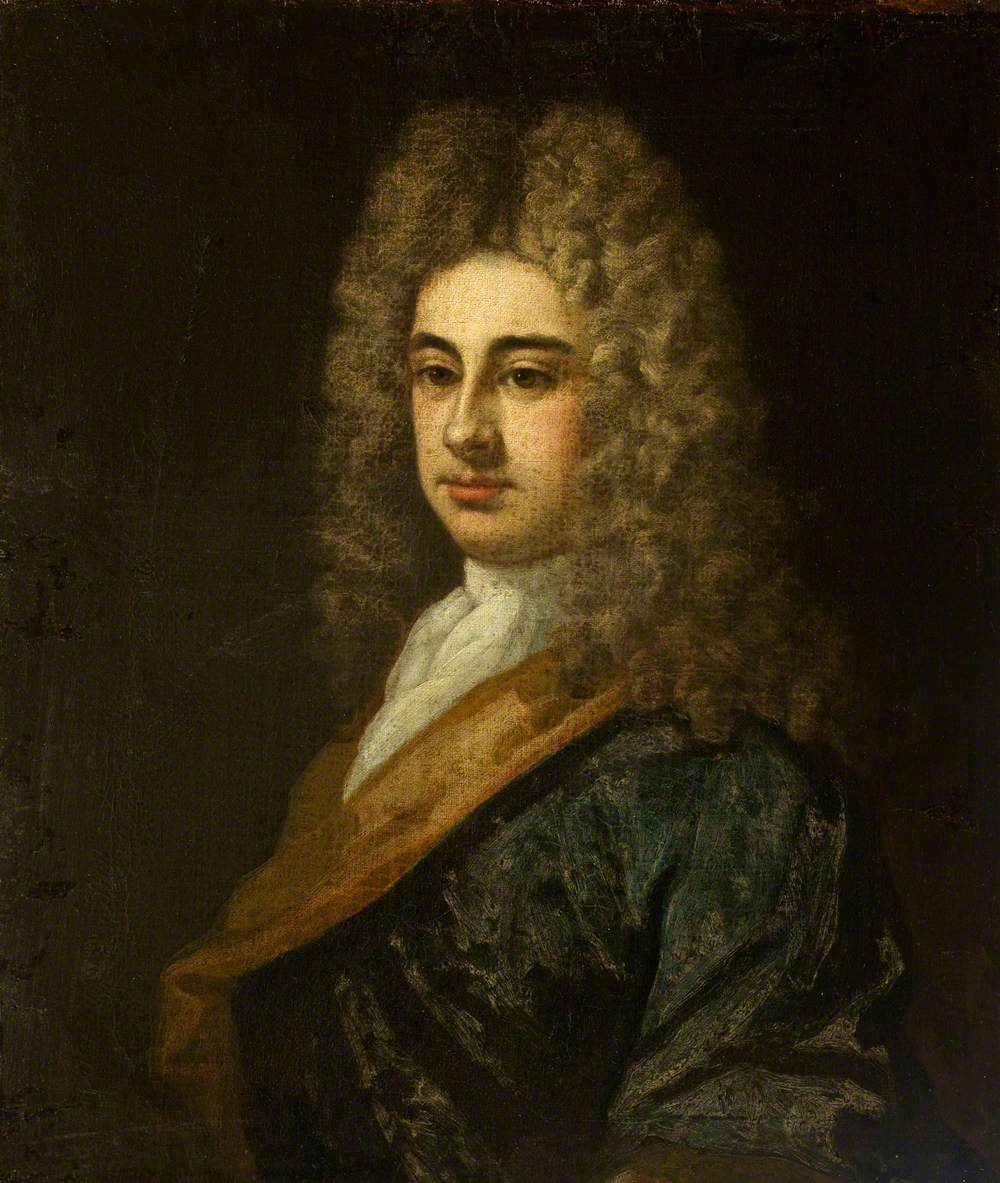
Portrait of his son, John, by Edward Gouge, 1707

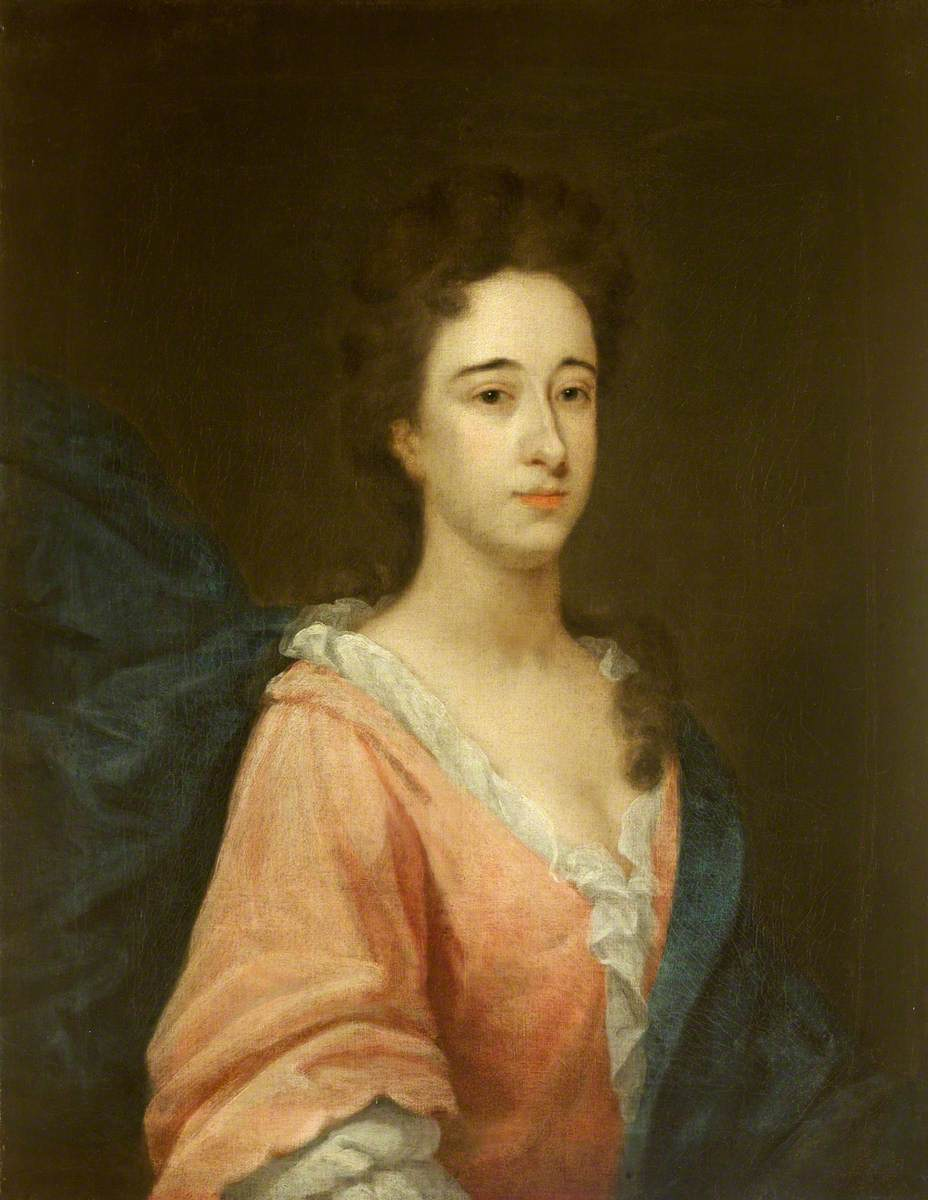
Portrait of his daughter, Anne, c. 1710–1717

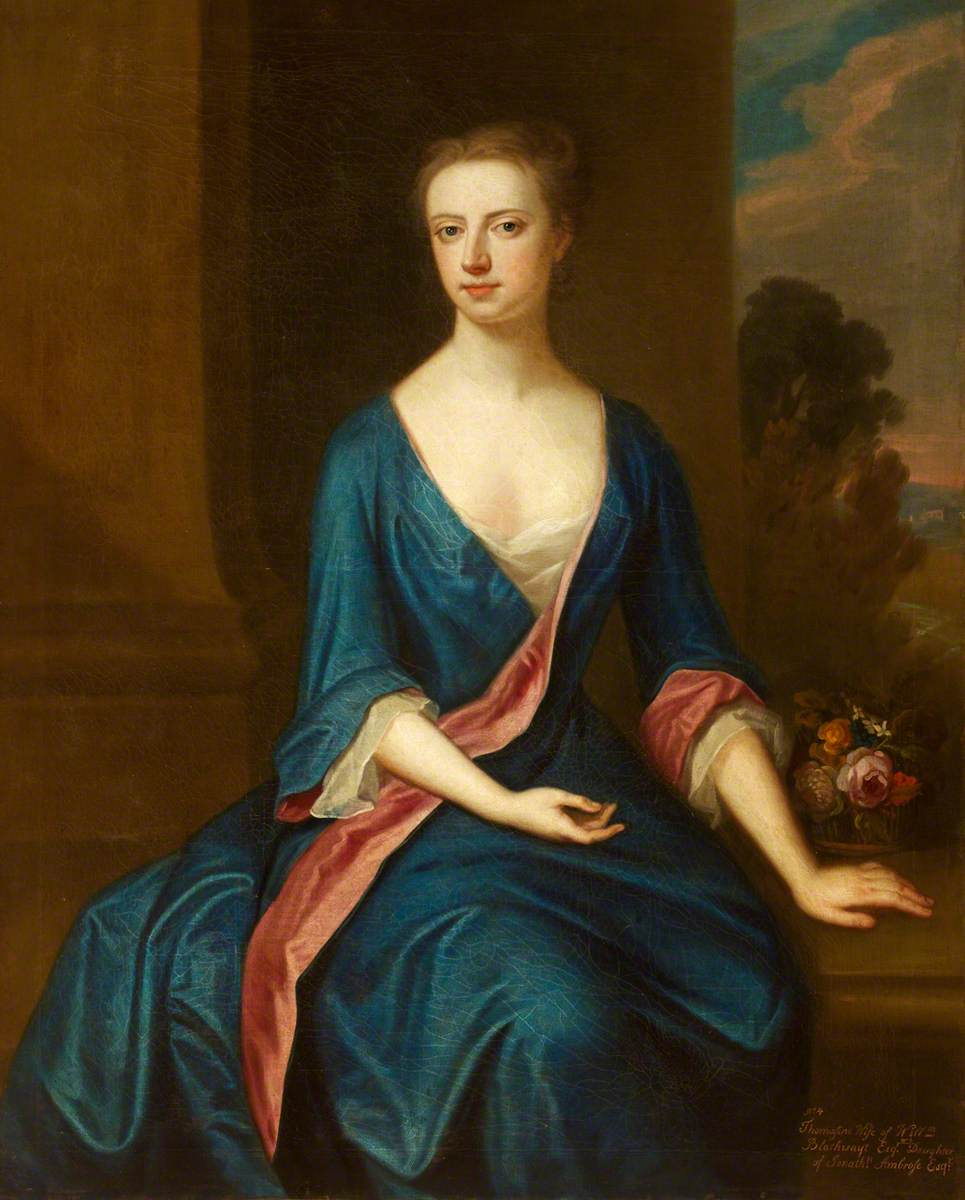
Portrait of his daughter-in-law, Thomasine Ambrose, between c. 1715 and c. 1720

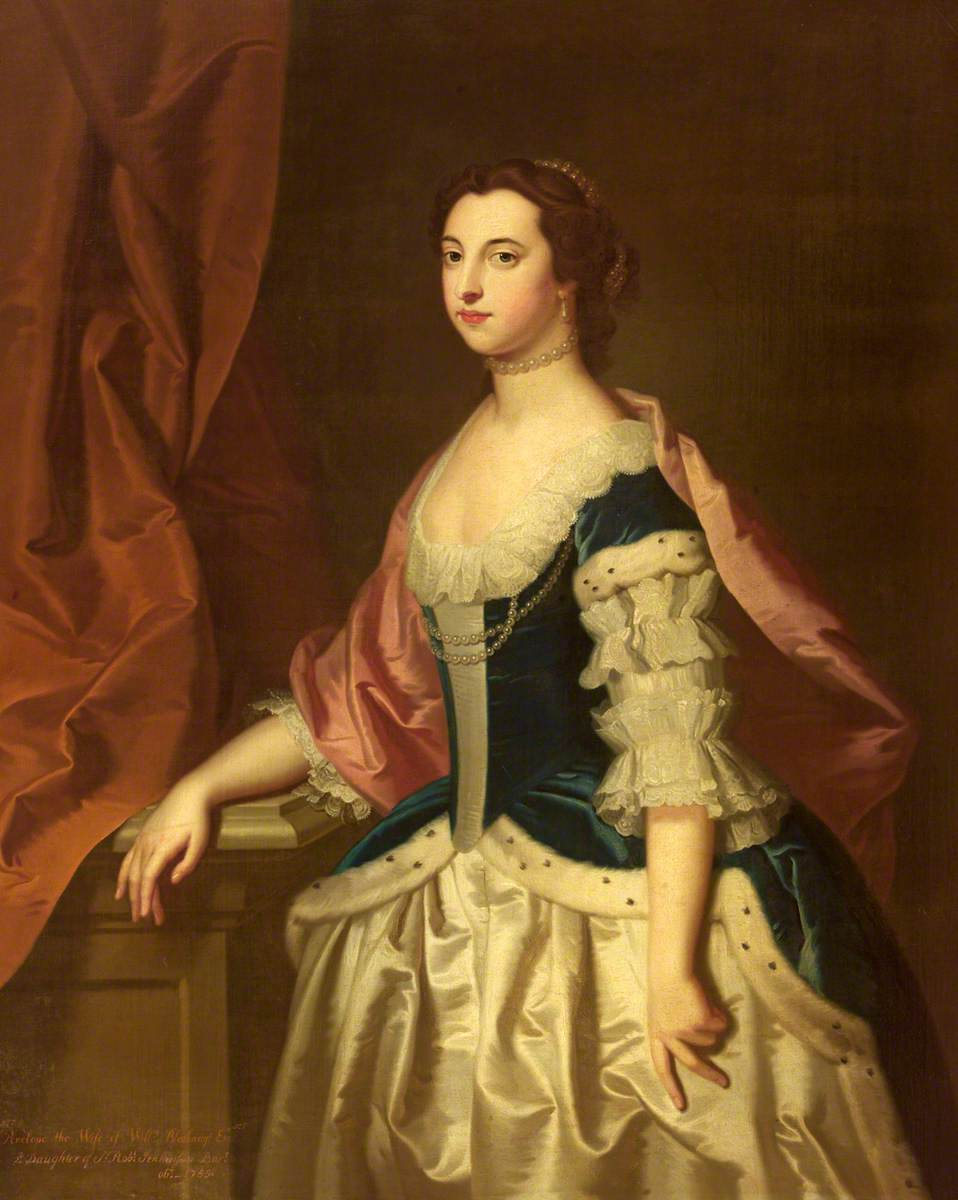
Portrait of Penelope Jenkinson, his grandson William Blathwayt's first wife, in the style of William Hoare, between c. 1730 and c. 1755

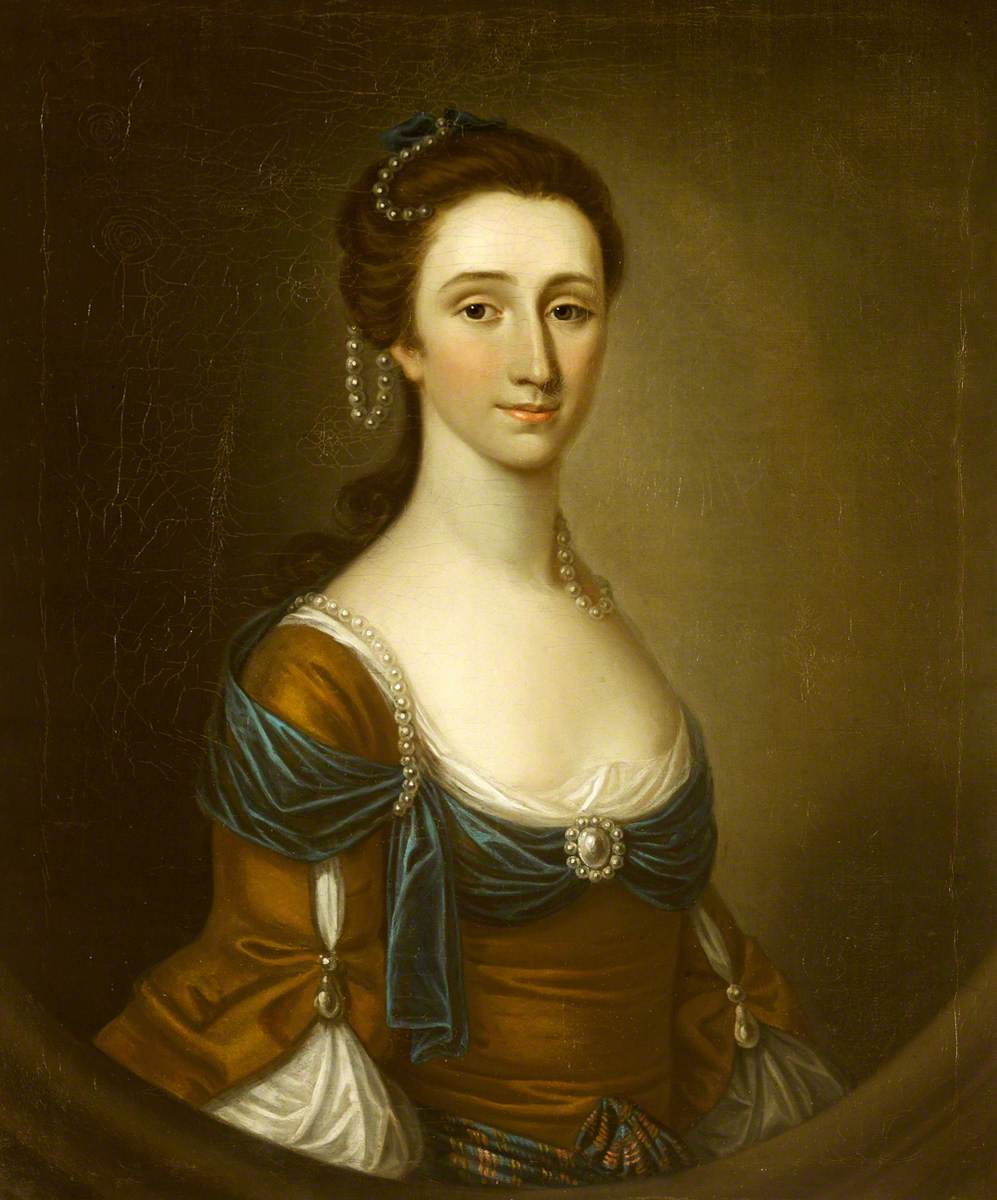
Portrait of Elizabeth Clark, his grandson William Blathwayt's second wife by John Astley, between c. 1760 and c. 1780

Parliament of England
Preceded by Sir John Holmes; Lord Finch	Member of Parliament for Newtown; 1685–1689; With: Thomas Done	Succeeded by Thomas Done; The Earl of Ranelagh
Preceded by Sir William Bassett; Joseph Langton	Member of Parliament for Bath; 1693–1707; With: Joseph Langton 1693–1695; Sir Thomas Estcourt 1695–1698; Alexander Popham 1698–1705; Samuel Trotman 1707	Succeeded by Parliament of Great Britain
Parliament of Great Britain
Preceded by Parliament of England	Member of Parliament for Bath; 1707–1710; With: Samuel Trotman	Succeeded by Samuel Trotman; John Codrington
Political offices
Preceded by Matthew Locke	Secretary at War; 1683–1692	Succeeded by George Clarke
