= Board of Trade =

Committee of the United Kingdom Privy Council

- The Lords of the Committee of the Privy Council appointed for the consideration of all matters relating to Trade and Foreign Plantations
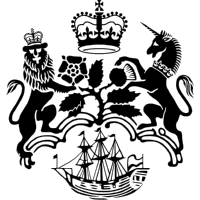
- Badge of the Board of Trade

Advisory board overview
- President responsible: Jonathan Reynolds
- Parent department: Department for Business and Trade
- Website: www.gov.uk/government/groups/board-of-trade

The Board of Trade is a British government body concerned with commerce and industry, currently within the Department for Business, Innovation, Science and Trade. Its full title is the Lords of the Committee of the Privy Council appointed for the consideration of all matters relating to Trade and Foreign Plantations, but is commonly known as the Board of Trade, and formerly known as the Lords of Trade and Plantations or Lords of Trade, and it has been a committee of the Privy Council of the United Kingdom. The board has gone through several evolutions, beginning with extensive involvement in colonial matters in the 17th century, to powerful regulatory functions in the Victorian Era and early 20th century. It was virtually dormant in the last third of the 20th century. In 2017, it was revitalised as an advisory board headed by the International Trade Secretary who has nominally held the title of President of the Board of Trade, and who at present is the only privy counsellor of the board, the other members of the present board filling roles as advisors.

== Overview ==
The board was first established as a temporary committee of England's Privy Council to advise on colonial (plantation) questions in the early 17th century, when these settlements were initially forming. The board would evolve gradually into a government department with considerable power and a diverse range of functions, including regulation of domestic and foreign commerce, the development, implementation and interpretation of the Acts of Trade and Navigation, and the review and acceptance of legislation passed in the colonies. Between 1696 and 1782 the Board of Trade, in partnership with the various secretaries of state over that time, (Note: Secretary of State (England) (to 1660), Secretary of State for the Southern Department (1660–1768), Secretary of State for the Colonies (1768-1782)) held responsibility for colonial affairs, particularly in British America. The newly created office of Home Secretary then held colonial responsibility until 1801, when the Secretary of State for War and the Colonies was established. Between 1768 and 1782 while with the Secretary of State for the Colonies, whose secretaryship was held jointly with the presidency of the Board of Trade, the latter position remained largely vacant; this led to a diminished status of the board and it became an adjunct to the new department and ministry concerns. Following the loss of the American War of Independence, both the board and the short-lived secretaryship were dismissed by the king on 2 May 1782 and the board was abolished later by the Civil List and Secret Service Money Act 1782 (22 Geo. 3. c. 82).

Following the Treaty of Paris 1783, with the continuing need to regulate trade between its remaining colonies, the independent United States and all other countries, a new Committee of Council on Trade and Plantations (later known as 'the First Committee') was established by William Pitt the Younger. Initially mandated by an Order in Council on 5 March 1784, the committee was reconstructed and strengthened by a second order, on 23 August 1786, under which it operated for the rest of its existence. The committee has been known as the Board of Trade since 1786, but this name was only officially adopted by section 65 of the Harbours and Passing Tolls, &c. Act 1861 (24 & 25 Vict. c. 47). The new board's first functions were consultative like earlier iterations, and its concern with plantations, in matters such as the approval of colonial laws, more successfully accomplished. As the Industrial Revolution expanded, the board's work became increasingly executive and domestic. From the 1840s, a succession of acts of Parliament gave it regulatory duties, notably concerning railways, merchant shipping and joint-stock companies.

The Lords of the Committee of Privy Council appointed for the consideration of matters relating to trade and foreign plantations may be described in all Acts of Parliament, deeds, contracts, and other instruments, by the official title of "the Board of Trade" without expressing their names; and all Acts of Parliament, contracts, deeds, and other instruments wherein they are so described, shall be as valid as if the said Lords or any of them had been named therein. — Harbours and Passing Tolls, &c. Act 1861

This department was merged with the Ministry of Technology in 1970, to form the Department of Trade and Industry. The Secretary of State for Trade and Industry (from 2009 Secretary of State for Business, Innovation and Skills) was also President of the Board of Trade. The full board has met only once since the mid-20th century, during commemorations of the bicentenary of the board in 1986. In 2016, the role of President of the Board of Trade was transferred to the Secretary of State for International Trade. The board was reconstituted in October 2017.

== History ==
=== Origins ===
In 1622, at the end of the Dutch Twelve Years' Truce, King James I directed the Privy Council of England to establish a temporary committee to investigate the causes of various economic and supply problems, the decline in trade and consequent financial difficulties; detailed instructions and questions were given, with answers to be given "as fast as the several points shall be duly considered by you." This would be followed by a number of temporary committees and councils to regulate the colonies and their commerce. The board's formal title remains "The Lords of the Committee of the Privy Council appointed for the consideration of all matters relating to Trade and Foreign Plantations".

In 1634, Charles I appointed a new commission for regulating plantations. It was headed by the Archbishop of Canterbury with its primary goals to increase royal authority and the influence of the Church of England in the colonies, particularly with the great influx of Puritans to the New World. Soon after, the English Civil Wars erupted and initiated a long period of political instability in England and the resultant loss of productivity for these committees. The war spread to varying degrees to the English colonies, depending on the internal demographics and political and religious division of each. Between 1643 and 1648 the Long Parliament established a parliamentary Commission for Plantations to take the lead in colonial and commercial affairs. This period also saw the first regulation of royal tonnage and poundage and begin the modernization of customs and excise as growing sources of government revenue.

During the Interregnum and Commonwealth three acts of the Rump Parliament in 1650 and 1651 are notable in the historical development of England's commercial and colonial programs. These include the first Commission of Trade to be established by an Act of Parliament on 1 August 1650. The instructions to the named commissioners, headed by Henry Vane the Younger, included consideration of both domestic and foreign trade, the trading companies, manufactures, free ports, customs, excise, statistics, coinage and exchange, and fisheries, as well as the plantations and the best means of promoting their welfare and rendering them useful to England. The act's statesmanlike and comprehensive instructions, along with an October act prohibiting trade with pro-royalist colonies and the Navigation Act of October 1651, formed the first definitive expression of England's commercial policy. They represent the first attempt to establish a legitimate control of commercial and colonial affairs, and the instructions indicate the beginnings of a policy which had the prosperity and wealth of England exclusively at heart.

It was the Lords of Trade who, in 1675, originated the idea of transforming all of the colonies in America into Royal Colonies for the purpose of securing English trade against the French. They brought New Hampshire under the Crown, modified Penn's charter, refused a charter to the Plymouth colony, and taking advantage of the concessions of the charters of Massachusetts and New York, created the Dominion of New England in 1685, thereby transforming all the territory from the Kennebec to the Delaware into a single crown colony.

=== 1696 reorganization ===
Mercantile losses during the Nine Years' War, and the currency crisis that led to the Great Recoinage of 1696, led to several proposals during the early 1690s for a more effective "council of trade" to advise the government. Reformers like Charles Davenant pushed for a council in which merchant representatives were seated, with extensive powers to regulate trade. These proposals were vigorously debated in the 3rd Parliament of William III, and became the substrate for partisan jousting, with the Court party proposing a scheme of royally-appointed commissioners, while the Country party pressed for a board appointed by Parliament. The reaction to the 1696 Jacobite assassination plot ensured that the Court plan carried the day, but with only marginally increased powers over the old committee, scrapping more radical reform in deference to politics surrounding the royal prerogative.

In May 1696, the old committee of the Privy Council was dissolved and its powers transferred to the new board of Commissioners for Trade and Plantations. The Lord Chancellor (or Lord Keeper), Lord President of the Council, Lord Privy Seal, Lord High Treasurer (or First Lord of the Treasury), Lord High Admiral (or First Lord of the Admiralty), Secretary of State, and Chancellor of the Exchequer were unpaid ex officio commissioners, but were not expected to be in regular attendance. Eight paid commissioners, over whom the senior, or "First Lord", presided, carried out the regular work of the commission. Staff appointed to serve the board in 1696 included a secretary, a deputy secretary, some clerks, office keepers, messengers, and a necessary woman; more staff such as a solicitor and a porter were added later.

The Bishop of London was added to the ex officio commissioners in 1702, and the Surveyor and Auditor-General of the Plantations in 1721.

The commission carried on the work of the former Lords of Trade but also had long periods of inactivity, devolving into chaos after 1761. The Council was dismissed by George III of Great Britain on 2 May 1782 and dissolved on 11 July 1782 by the Civil List and Secret Service Money Act 1782.

=== Reestablishment 1784 ===
William Pitt the Younger re-established the committee of the Privy Council in 1784, and an Order in Council of 23 August 1786 provided the formal basis that still remains in force. A secretariat was established which included the president, vice president and board members. By 1793, the board still remained in its old structure, with 20 members including the Archbishop of Canterbury. After 1820 the board ceased to meet regularly and the business was carried out entirely by the secretariat. The short name of "Board of Trade" was formalised in 1861.

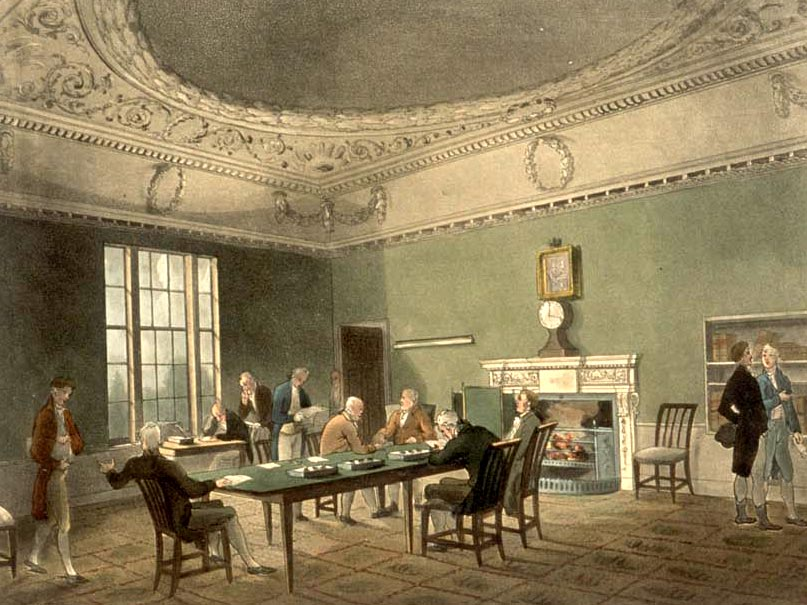
The Board of Trade circa 1808.

In the 19th century the board had an advisory function on economic activity in the UK and its empire. During the second half of the 19th century, it also dealt with legislation for patents, designs and trademarks, company regulation, labour and factories, merchant shipping, agriculture, transport, power etc. Colonial matters passed to the Colonial Office and other functions were devolved to newly created departments, a process that continued for much of the 20th century.

The original commission comprised the seven (later eight) Great Officers of State, who were not required to attend meetings, and the eight paid members, who were required to attend. The board, so constituted, had little real power, and matters related to trade and the colonies were usually within the jurisdiction of the secretaries of state and the Privy Council, with the board confining itself mainly to colonial administration.

=== 20th century reforms ===
==== Lloyd George as President (1905–1908) ====
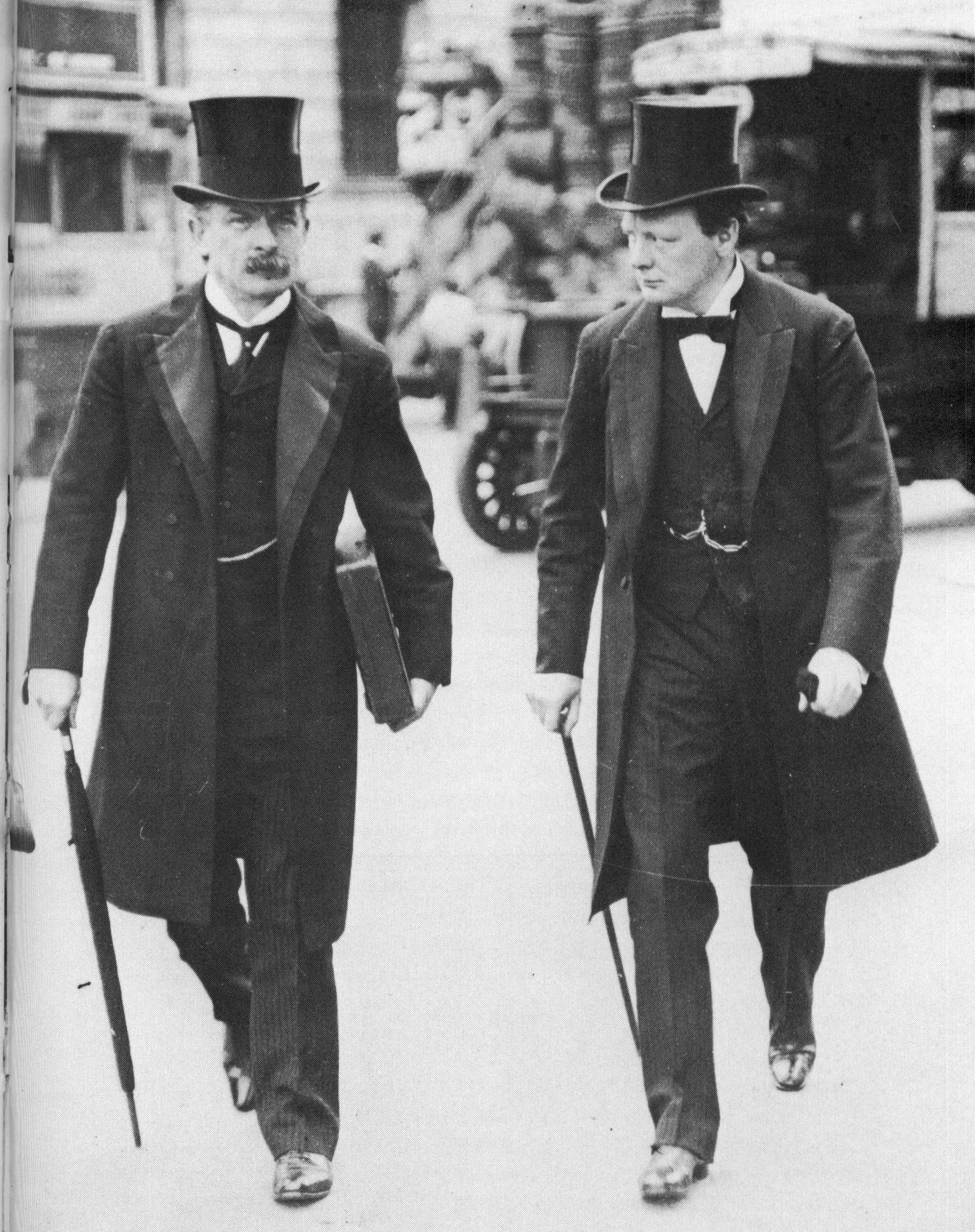
Lloyd George and Winston Churchill in 1907

In 1905, David Lloyd George entered the new Liberal Cabinet of Sir Henry Campbell-Bannerman as President of the Board of Trade.

The first priority on taking office was the repeal of the Education Act 1902. Lloyd George took the lead along with Augustine Birrell, President of the Board of Education. Lloyd George was the dominant figure on the committee drawing up the bill in its later stages and insisted that the bill create a separate education committee for Wales. The bill passed the House of Commons greatly amended but was completely mangled by the House of Lords. No compromise was possible and the bill was abandoned, allowing the 1902 act to continue in effect. Nonconformists were bitterly upset by the failure of the Liberal Party to reform the Education Act 1902, its most important promise to them, and over time their support for the Liberal Party slowly fell away.

According to Martin Roberts, Lloyd George headed a department of 750 experts that was responsible for supervising British industry, commerce and transportation. Using their pool of expertise, he initiated a series of reforms that were quickly endorsed by the Liberal Parliament. One of the first actions was the Census of Production Act 1906 (6 Edw. 7. c. 49), which generated a Survey of production—an up-to-date compendium of detailed statistics necessary for regulating specific industries. The Merchant Shipping Act 1906 upgraded the minimum working conditions, and the safety protections for both British sailors, and crews of foreign ships that used British ports. The Patents and Design Act 1907 gave financial protection to British designs to stop unfair foreign copies. In the long term, his most important innovation was the Port of London Act 1908 creating the Port of London Authority. It merged numerous inefficient and overlapping private companies and gave unified supervision to Britain's most important port. That enabled London to compete more effectively with Hamburg and Rotterdam.

Lloyd George also turned his attention to strikes and industrial disputes in shipyards. He was instrumental in settling the serious threat of a national railway strike in 1907. While almost all the rail companies refused to recognise the unions, he persuaded them to recognise elected representatives of the workers who sat with the company representatives on conciliation boards—one for each company. If those boards failed to agree then an arbitrator would be called upon.

==== Churchill as President 1908–1910 ====
H. H. Asquith succeeded the terminally ill prime minister on 8 April 1908 and, four days later, Winston Churchill was appointed President of the Board of Trade, succeeding Lloyd George who became Chancellor of the Exchequer. He continued the reform impulse Lloyd George had launched. One of Churchill's first tasks was to arbitrate in an industrial dispute among ship-workers and employers on the River Tyne. He afterwards established a Standing Court of Arbitration to deal with future industrial disputes, establishing a reputation as a conciliator. In Cabinet, he worked with Lloyd George to champion social reform. He promoted what he called a "network of State intervention and regulation" akin to that in Germany.

Churchill's main achievements came in 1909. First was the Labour Exchanges Bill. It set up over 200 labour exchanges with William Beveridge in charge. The unemployed would come in and be assisted in finding employment. He also promoted the idea of an unemployment insurance scheme, which would be part-funded by the state. Secondly he introduced the Trade Boards Bill, creating trade boards which investigated the sweated trades and enabled the prosecution of exploitative employers. Passing with a large majority, it established the principle of a minimum wage and the right of workers to have meal breaks. Churchill introduced the Mines Eight Hours Bill, which legally prohibited miners from working more than an eight-hour day.

Sydney Buxton served as president between 1910 and 1914. His main role was passage of numerous specific trade and commerce laws.

=== Since 1973 ===
From 1973, international trade policy of the United Kingdom was a competence of the European Economic Community, and later of the European Union. The board was reconstituted in October 2017, after the UK had voted to leave the European Union in June 2016. In its most recent iteration in 2017, only privy counsellors can be actual members of the board, while others are appointed as advisers.

== Members ==
There is only one standing member in the Board, who is its President.

=== Ministers ===
The Board is held accountable to Parliament through ministers attached to the Board, who are not necessarily members.

- President of the Board of Trade
- Vice-President of the Board of Trade

=== Current advisers ===
Advisers to the Board for 2025.

- Omar Ali
- Mike Hawes
- Dame Vivian Hunt
- Allison Kirkby
- Paul Lindley
- Catherine McGuinness
- Michelle Ovens
- Mike Soutar
- Sarah Walker
- Charles Woodburn
- Alex Kendall
- Alexander Walsh
- Sonny Leong, Baron Leong

=== Ex officio members ===
- Secretary of State for Scotland: Douglas Alexander MP
- Secretary of State for Northern Ireland: Hilary Benn MP
- Secretary of State for Wales: Jo Stevens MP
- Lady Mayor of London: Dame Susan Langley

== See also ==
- President of the Board of Trade, complete list and links
- Imperial Lighthouse Service

== Further reading and works cited ==
- Basye, Arthur Herbert. The Lords Commissioners of Trade and Plantations, commonly known as the Board of Trade, 1748-1782 (Yale University Press, 1925) online.
- Black, Alistair, and Christopher Murphy. "Information, Intelligence, and Trade: The Library and the Commercial Intelligence Branch of the British Board of Trade, 1834–1914." Library & Information History 28.3 (2012): 186-201.
- Brown, Lucy M. The Board of Trade and the free-trade movement, 1830-42 (Clarendon Press, 1958).
- Emsley, Clive (1979). British Society and the French Wars 1793-1815. Macmillan Press. ISBN 978-1-349-16115-7.
- Dickerson, Oliver Morton. American colonial government 1696-1765: A study of the British Board of Trade in its relation to the American colonies, political, industrial, administrative (1912) online.
- Gilbert, Bentley B. David Lloyd George: A Political Life: vol 1 The Architect of Change 1863-1912 (1987) pp 285–334.
- Olson, Alison G. "The board of trade and London-American interest groups in the eighteenth century." Journal of Imperial and Commonwealth History 8.2 (1980): 33-50.
- Rosevear, Stephen. "Balancing business and the regions: British distribution of industry policy and the Board of Trade, 1945–51." Business History 40.1 (1998): 77-99.
- Root, Winfred T. (October 1917). "The Lords of Trade and Plantations, 1675-1696". American Historical Review. 23 (1). University of Chicago Press: 20–41. doi:10.2307/1837684. JSTOR 1837684.
- Smith, Hubert Llewellyn. The Board of Trade (1928) a major history, 288pp online; also see online review
- Steele, Ian Kenneth. Politics of Colonial Policy: The Board of Trade in Colonial Administration 1696-1720 (Clarendon Press, 1968).
