= American Museum and Gardens =

Culture and arts museum near Bath, England

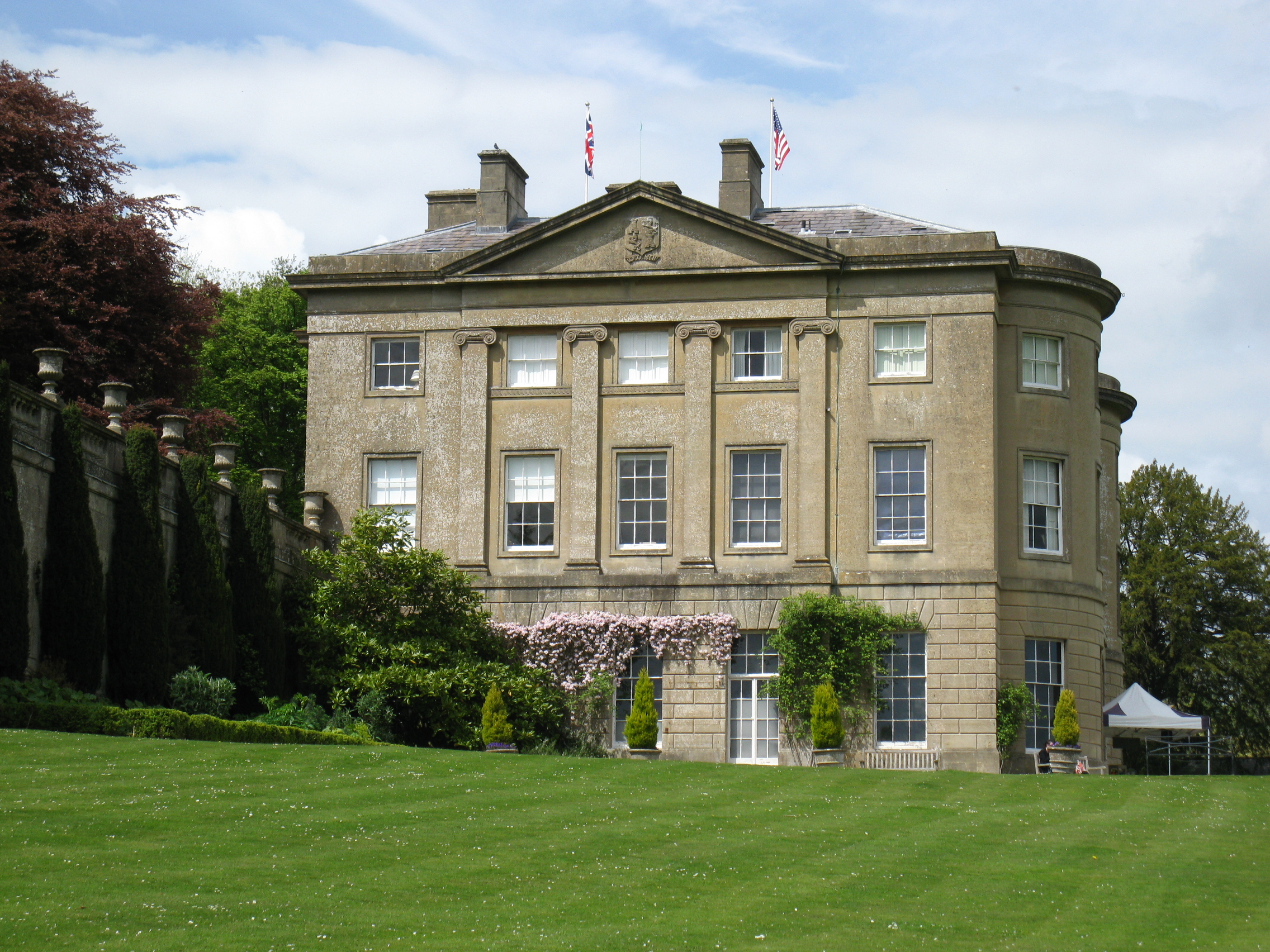
- Claverton Manor, which houses the main museum collection

- Location within Somerset and the United Kingdom
- Established: 1961
- Location: Claverton, Somerset, England
- Coordinates: 51.3768°N 2.3110°W
- Founders: Dallas Pratt and John Judkyn
- Director: Lucy Littlewood
- Website: americanmuseum.org

Listed Building – Grade I
- Reference no.: 1214609

The American Museum and Gardens (formerly American Museum in Britain) is a museum of American art and culture based at Claverton, near Bath, England. Its collections of American furniture, quilts and folk art are displayed in a Grade I listed 19th-century house, surrounded by gardens overlooking the valley of the River Avon.

== Claverton Manor ==
The country house was designed for John Vivian, a barrister who had purchased the manor in 1816, by Jeffry Wyatville in 1819–20. It stands on the steep west slope of the Avon valley, above the Claverton village, and is about 2 miles (3.2 km) east of the centre of Bath.

The house has three storeys and is built in ashlar. Its east elevation, overlooking the river valley, has full-height bows flanking three central bays with a projecting square porch, above it two Ionic columns in antis. The south elevation has five bays, the central three embellished with Ionic pilasters under a pediment bearing the Vivian arms. A tall screen wall to the south has urns on pedestals, and a six-bay north wing containing service rooms has similar decoration. The building and walls were designated as Grade I listed in 1956. A two-storey coach house and stables were built to the south of the house, also in ashlar, around 1820.

Earlier owners of the estate include Sir Edward Hungerford (d.1607), a Member of Parliament, and (from 1609) Martin Bassett, whose son William (d.1656) and grandson William (d.1693) were also MPs. In 1758 it was bought by Ralph Allen, owner of Bath stone quarries, and in 1816 by John Vivian, who replaced the earlier manor house (near Claverton church) with the present house on its elevated site. Vivian's second son George, an artist and traveller, developed the gardens and added the screen walls.

The estate had a succession of owners after it was sold by the Vivian family in 1869, and during the ownership of the Skrine family the gardens were in 1897 the venue for the first public speech by Winston Churchill. The house was the headquarters of an RAF barrage balloon group during the Second World War. John Judkyn and Dallas Pratt, co-founders of the museum, bought the house and grounds in 1958.

== Museum ==
The museum was founded by two antique collectors: Dallas Pratt (1914 – 1994), an American psychiatrist from New York and heir to a substantial Standard Oil fortune; and his lifelong partner John Judkyn (1913 – 1963), a British designer and antiques dealer who took American citizenship. The museum was opened to the public for the first time on July 1, 1961, and remains the only museum devoted to American decorative arts outside the boundaries of the United States. The museum's mission today stays true to the ambitions of its founders; to increase knowledge of American cultural history in order to strengthen the relationship between the United States and the United Kingdom.

The museum remains a popular attraction, with well over 3 million visitors in total by 2012. The former coach house is used by the museum for weddings and other functions.

Richard Wendorf, an American literary scholar and librarian, was Director of the Museum between 2010 and 2021.

== Collection and exhibitions ==
The museum collection is displayed in the manor house and includes a variety of American cultural artefacts, decorative arts and antiques, as well as a series of Period Rooms covering a historical period from circa 1690 to 1860. These rooms are reconstructions of those from a variety of historic American interiors, including a late seventeenth-century Puritan home, an eighteenth-century tavern, and a sumptuous New Orleans bedroom dating from around the eve of the American Civil War in 1860. The museum's collection also includes world renowned Shaker furniture, an extensive collection of over 200 quilts and textiles (50 of which are on permanent display), a collection of over 200 antique historical maps, and the most significant collection of American folk art in Europe. The museum collection includes works by a variety of artists, such as Susan Powers, Grandma Moses and Clementine Hunter, as well as the portraitists John Brewster, Jr., Ammi Phillips and William Matthew Prior. There are also carved eagles by Wilhelm Schimmel and Frederick Myrick.

The museum also hosts a different exhibition every year exploring more recent American history. Recent temporary exhibitions have included The Colourful World of Kaffe Fassett, Shooting Stars: Britain and America in the 1970s (featuring the photography of Carinthia West), and Kith and Kin: The Quilts of Gee's Bend. These exhibitions are situated in the museum's exhibition gallery, located in a separate building to the manor house. The museum's gift shop is also located in this building.

== Garden ==
The grounds of the museum are set within the wider landscape of the valley of the River Avon and has fine views over the valley towards the village of Limpley Stoke and the Kennet and Avon Canal. Garden features include a small grotto with a water spout.

The museum gardens include extensive renovated areas representing trends in both English landscape and American garden design. The American Museum originally employed Lanning Roper to design a mixed border, but since the museum opened in 1961, the 30 acres around the house have been developed to include a replica of George Washington’s garden at Mount Vernon, as well as a Lewis and Clark trail, and an arboretum that includes a collection of American trees.

The Mount Vernon Garden, which is a re-creation of a part of George Washington's garden at Mount Vernon, is situated away from the house on the site of a former Italianate garden and was opened on June 26, 1962. In 2018 the Mount Vernon Garden was restored to replicate more closely the original layout implemented by George Washington.

With the addition of the New American Garden, officially opened on September 15, 2018, as part of a £2 million project to renovate the lawn and herb gardens immediately adjacent to the manor house, the museum grounds now boast the largest collection of American horticultural features in the United Kingdom. This project was the first European commission for the American landscape architects based in Washington D.C., Oehme van Sweden (OvS). The planting in the New American Garden follows the free-form style made famous by the firm's founders, Wolfgang Oehme and James van Sweden. Native American shrubs, perennials, and bulbs feature heavily, but the garden is designed to work with the steep terrain and enhance the view over the Limpley Stoke Valley, which is a designated Area of Outstanding Natural Beauty (AONB). The new garden path, known as The Winding Way, is a fully accessible pathway encircling the lawns and American Rose Collection, as well as the natural amphitheatre, which has become the museum's outdoor theatre and events space.

== Governance ==
The museum is run by a registered charity, overseen by a board of trustees. It was established by a trust deed in 1959, registered as a charity in 1968, and re-registered in 2004.
