= Thomas Povey (Massachusetts) =

American politician

Thomas Povey (fl. 1690–1706) was an English military officer who also served as lieutenant governor of the Province of Massachusetts Bay from 1702 to 1706. He was probably related in some way to Thomas Povey FRS and was a cousin to colonial secretary William Blathwayt, and may have acquired the lieutenant governorship through this connection. He served for nine years in the English military campaigns in Europe. His tenure as lieutenant governor under the domineering Joseph Dudley apparently did not sit well with him, for by 1706 he had resigned the post and left the colony.
