= Commissioners for Trade and Plantations =

The Commissioners for Trade and Plantations was a body formed by the British Crown on 15 May 1696 to promote trade and to inspect and improve the plantations of the British colonies. It was the successor of various previous bodies set up in the seventeenth century, particularly the Lords of Trade and Plantations (1675–1696). It lasted until its abolition in 1782. It carried out its duties by maintaining correspondence with colonial governors, conducting inquiries, hearing complaints and interviewing merchants and colonial agents. The information so obtained was used to advise King and Parliament. The new board did not exercise executive authority and had no significant powers of appointment. Nevertheless it exerted significant influence owing to its specialised knowledge and the maintenance of an extensive archive.

== Terminology ==
In the historical documents this organisation was sometimes known colloquially as the "Lords of Trade" or "Board of Trade", however in formal documents it was called the "Lords Commissioners for Trade and Plantations". The historian John William Fortescue used the term "Council of Trade and Plantations" However with the more recent publication of the Calendar of State Papers Colonial, America and West Indies in 1994, the editor, K. G. Davies indicated that the use of the term "Commissioners for Trade and Plantations" had become established as the preferred terminology.

== See also ==
- Board of Trade
