= Justinian Povey =

Justinian Povey (d. 1652), held office as Auditor of the Exchequer and administrator for Anne of Denmark.

== Career ==
Justinian Povey was the son of John Povey, an embroiderer in London. His sister Joan married William Angell, a fishmonger. A brother, John Povey, became the owner of Lauderdale House at Highgate.

Povey worked as an auditor's clerk for the administration of the crown lands of the North East from around 1590. He was able to some lands from the crown estate. In 1611, he became the Queen's Auditor, succeeding Ralph Ewens of Southcowton (died 1611). Ewens had also been Clerk of Commons. In 1617 Povey audited an account of jewels supplied to Anne of Denmark by George Heriot. He was listed as a member of the household of Anne of Denmark as auditor-general in 1619.

Povey became auditor for Henrietta Maria and Keeper of the Woods in Yorkshire for Charles I.

In 1641 Povey was living on Aldersgate in London. He also owned The Priory at Hounslow.

In September 1641 he was asked for evidence of the institution of a Queen's Court, concerning the property and revenues of English queens consort, and also as a court of equity, dealing with legal matters. Povey had some of Anne of Denmark's revenue accounts, and a red vellum bound book of papers. He was deprived of his offices during the Civil War.

== Family ==
Justinian Povey married Beatrix Stanley, the daughter of John Stanley of Roydon Hall, Essex, and Beatrix daughter of Henry Dynne of Heydon, Norfolk, an Auditor of the Exchequer. Their children included:

- John Povey
- William Povey, married Francis Sherborne (b. 1624).
- Thomas Povey, Member of Parliament.
- Anne Povey (b. 1615), married William Blathwayt at Hounslow in 1642, and secondly Thomas Vivian.

Sir John Povey, Lord Chief Justice of Ireland, was a close relative: his branch of the family settled at Market Drayton in Shropshire.
