= William Bassett (Royalist) =

William Bassett (c. 1602 – 1656) was an English landowner and politician who sat in the House of Commons from 1640 to 1644. He supported the Royalist cause in the Civil War.

Bassett was born at Colchester, the son of Martin Bassett. He was at school in Colchester and was admitted at Christ's College, Cambridge on 15 January 1627 aged 15. His father bought Claverton, an estate of 1,300 acres outside Bath, in 1609 and moved there.

In November 1640, Bassett was elected Member of Parliament for Bath in the Long Parliament. He was nominated to the county committee but he was disabled as a Royalist in 1644. He compounded for £1,935 in 1651.

Bassett married as his second wife Elizabeth Killigrew, daughter of Sir Joseph Killigrew of Lothbury, London and Landrake, Cornwall. His son William was also MP for Bath.

Parliament of England
Preceded by Sir Charles Berkley; Alexander Popham	Member of Parliament for Bath; 1640–1644; With: Alexander Popham	Succeeded by Alexander Popham; James Ashe
