= Ralph Ewens =

English administrator and Member of Parliament

Ralph Ewens of South Cowton (1569–1611) was an English administrator and Member of Parliament.

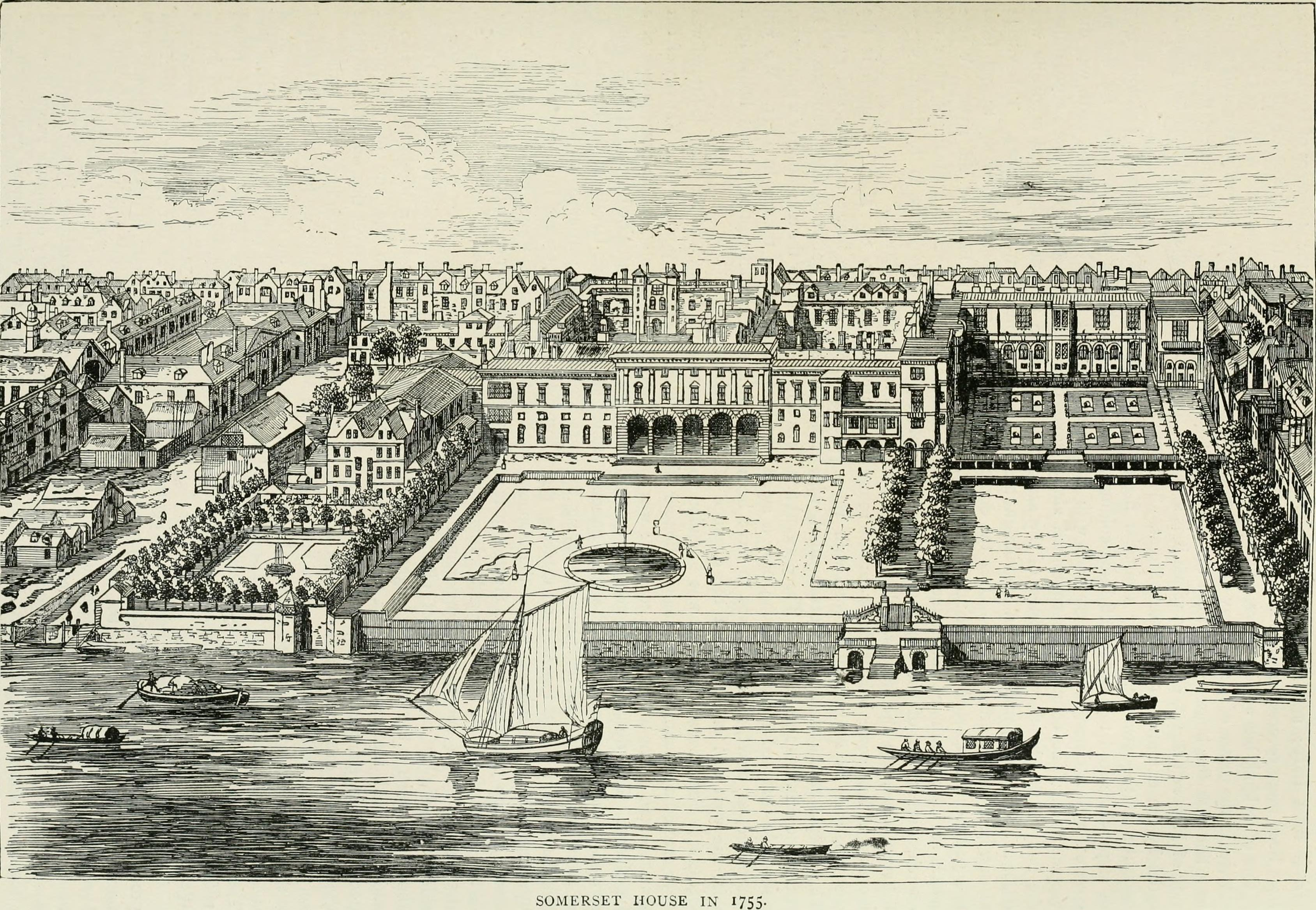
Ewens drafted a lease for a Somerset House garden

== Career ==
Ewens was first employed by John Stanhope, 1st Baron Stanhope, who was Master of the Posts and Treasurer of the Chamber in the 1590s. Ewens was Member of Parliament for Winchelsea in 1597, and for Beverley in 1601. Ewens was also Clerk of the Commons.

Ewens was appointed to the council administering the English jointure lands of Anne of Denmark, wife of James VI and I, and acted as surveyor and auditor under the leadership of Robert Cecil. Like the Queen's Attorney, Robert Hitcham, he was a member of Gray's Inn. In December 1603, Ewens, aged 34, married Margaret Hotoft, the widow of a goldsmith at St Margaret, New Fish Street.

The first grant of English lands and manors was made to Anne of Denmark on 19 September 1603, and included Havering Palace and Nonsuch Palace. These were said to have been lands held by Elizabeth I before her accession. The administration of the King's estate and crown lands was a responsibility of the Lord Treasurer, Lord Buckhurst.

Ralph Ewens had researched the dower lands given to previous queen consorts, and the activities of the council of Catherine Parr, in the archives of the Rolls Office in August. He wrote to Cecil that Lord Buckhurst had researchers looking at the same material. The work was achieved during the "tyme of sickness when the same was very hoate". The lands, chosen by Ewens and approved by Robert Cecil would generate an income of £5,000 yearly. Anne of Denmark would be allowed to grant leases of 21 years duration. The settlement was said to be comparable with that given to Catherine of Aragon, and included similar crown lands and manors.

Lord Cecil was the keeper of Somerset House, a property granted to the Queen. An adjacent garden was leased to the herbalist, John Gerard. Ewens worked on drafting a lease for Gerard's garden and the palace tennis court in July 1604. Cecil was to present the finished document to Anne of Denmark for her signature.

As Clerk of the Commons, Ewens noted the discovery of the Gunpowder Plot in the margin of an official journal. Ewens wrote to John Coke in April 1609 discussing his landlord, who had been punished for spreading fake news.

Ewens died in September 1611 and was buried at St Clement Danes. Justinian Povey was appointed the Queen's auditor. Ewens mentioned in his will that he was a friend of Thomas Smythe and an adventurer in the Virginia Company. He left his property in Yorkshire to his brother Richard Ewens. Richard Ewens and his son-in-law John Messenger bought Fountains Abbey in May 1627 from Humphrey Wharton of Gillingwood Hall.
