= William Clarke (English politician) =

The Right Honourable Sir William Clarke

Secretary at War
- In office 1661–1666
- Preceded by: Office created
- Succeeded by: Matthew Locke

Sir William Clarke (died 1666) was an English politician. Born about 1623 in London of obscure parentage, he was admitted as a student to Inner Temple in 1645 and called to the bar in 1653. On 28 January 1661 he was appointed Secretary at War, after having served for at least the previous twelve years as secretary to General Monck. Clarke served as Secretary to the Council of the Army, 1647–1649, and Secretary to General Monck and the Commanders of the Army in Scotland, 1651-1660. Clarke served as the Secretary at War from 1661 to his death in 1666, as a casualty of war with the Dutch. With the Restoration, both Monck and Clarke had great favour with Charles II, who bestowed knighthood upon Clarke and gave him the use, for a term of some years, of the great lodge and 60 acres within Marylebone Park. His widow was Dorothy Clarke, and they had one son, George Clarke.

== Circumstances related to Clarke's death ==
In November 1652 Monck became a general at sea in the First Anglo-Dutch War, which was concluded with an English victory in the Battle of Scheveningen in August 1653, although a peace treaty was not signed for another eight months. The Commonwealth government of Oliver Cromwell tried to avoid further conflict with the Dutch Republic, but the Treaty of Westminster planted the seeds of future conflict.

The Restoration government of Charles II negotiated a new treaty with the Dutch Republic in 1661, concluding the treaty by 1662. By 1664, however, English ships had begun provoking Dutch ships, and the English invaded the Dutch colony of New Netherland in North America on 24 June 1664, and had control of it by October. This Second Anglo-Dutch War was to cost Clarke his life. In the winter of 1666 the Dutch created a strong anti-English alliance. On 26 January, Louis declared war. In February Frederick III of Denmark did the same after having received a large sum. By the spring of 1666, the Dutch had rebuilt their fleet with much heavier ships — thirty of them possessing more cannon than any Dutch ship in early 1665 — and threatened to join with the French.

The result was the Four Days' Battle, one of the longest naval engagements in history. Despite administrative and logistic difficulties, a fleet of eighty ships under General-at-Sea Monck, the Commonwealth veteran, (after the Duke of Albemarle) set sail at the end of May 1666. In his official capacity Clarke attended Monck aboard the Royal Charles. The Four Days' Battle began on June 1. On the 2nd day, Clarke's right leg was shattered by a cannonball. Monck reported that "he bore it bravely" but, two days later, Clarke died. His body was buried at Harwich.

== The Clarke Papers ==
The Clarke Papers are Sir William's working papers for 1623/24 to 1666, bequeathed by George Clarke, Sir William's son, to Worcester College, Oxford. These papers, an important primary source for the English Civil War and the Interregnum, were first brought to wide public attention by the historian Charles Harding Firth. He edited and published a four volume selection entitled The Clarke Papers (1891–1901). The papers themselves are 51 bound volumes with a large amount of unbound material. In 2005, the historian Frances Henderson published a new selection of Clarke's working papers taken from the large collection of his writings in shorthand.
