= Matthew Locke (administrator) =

17th-century English politician (1660–1683)

Secretary at War
- In office 1666–1683
- Monarch: Charles II
- Preceded by: Sir William Clarke
- Succeeded by: William Blathwayt

Personal details
- Born: 1660 England
- Died: 1683 (aged 22–23)

Matthew Locke (fl. 1660–1683) was an English administrator, holder of the post of Secretary at War from 1666 to 1683, when he sold it.

Locke was clerk to the "Irish and Scottish Committee" set up in 1651, and later gave evidence against Henry Vane the Younger who was on it. He was a nephew of Sir Paul Davis, also concerned in Irish business as administrator, and was then private secretary to George Monck. He was related also, at some distance, to Robert Southwell.

After the death of Monck (who had become the Duke of Albemarle) in 1670, Locke transformed the role of his secretaryship. It took on a significant share of military movement and supply orders. Locke's tenure consolidated the administrative role of the post.

The secretaryship was bought from Locke in 1683 by William Blathwayt, who had royal backing.

== Notes ==
Political offices
Vacant Title last held by George Lane	Chief Secretary for Ireland; 1660	Succeeded by Thomas Page
