= George Vivian (artist) =

English traveller and topographical artist

- Born: 1798
- Died: 5 January 1873 (aged 74–75); 11 Grosvenor Square, London
- Resting place: Brompton Cemetery
- Education: Eton College
- Occupations: Traveller, artist, painter, drawer, writer, art collector
- Spouse: Elizabeth Anne Grey (1842– )
- Children: Ralph Vivian; Minna Frances; Alice Jane
- Parents: John Vivian (father); Marianne Edwards (mother)
- Notable work: The Fine Arts Commission in 1846; Some Illustrations of the Architecture of Claverton and of the Duke's House, Bradford, etc. (1837)
- Style: Topographical art, Spanish and Italian landscapes, monumental art, lithographs
- Elected: Royal Fine Art Commission
- Member of: Travellers Club, Society of Dilettanti

George Vivian (1798–1873) was an English traveller and topographical artist. He is known for Spanish landscapes and views from Italian gardens.

== Life ==
He was the second son of John Vivian, a solicitor of the excise, and barrister, the second son of Matthew Vivian of Penelewey, near Truro. He was educated at Eton College, and matriculated at Christ Church, Oxford in 1817 (but did not graduate).

Vivian made early travels to Vienna and the Balkans in 1818, and Albania in 1819 (when he met Ali Pasha of Ioánnina (1740–1822)). There is a family tradition that, in 1821, George Vivian was an Extra Page of Honour to King George IV - engaged to link arms with others in front of the door to Poets’ Corner at Westminster Abbey in order to prevent Queen Caroline from attending the Coronation of George IV on 19 July 1821. "The Coronation of his most sacred Majesty King George IV. 19 July 1821" by George Nayler records ‘- Vivian Esq.’ as one of the Pages, but it is not clear whether it was George or another member of the Vivian family who was concerned in this incident. During a journey of 1824 to the Near East he encountered Lord Byron. In 1828, on the death of his father, he inherited Claverton Manor, near Bath. He joined the Travellers Club in 1828 or 1829. He made further journeys, to Spain and Portugal, in 1831 and 1837.

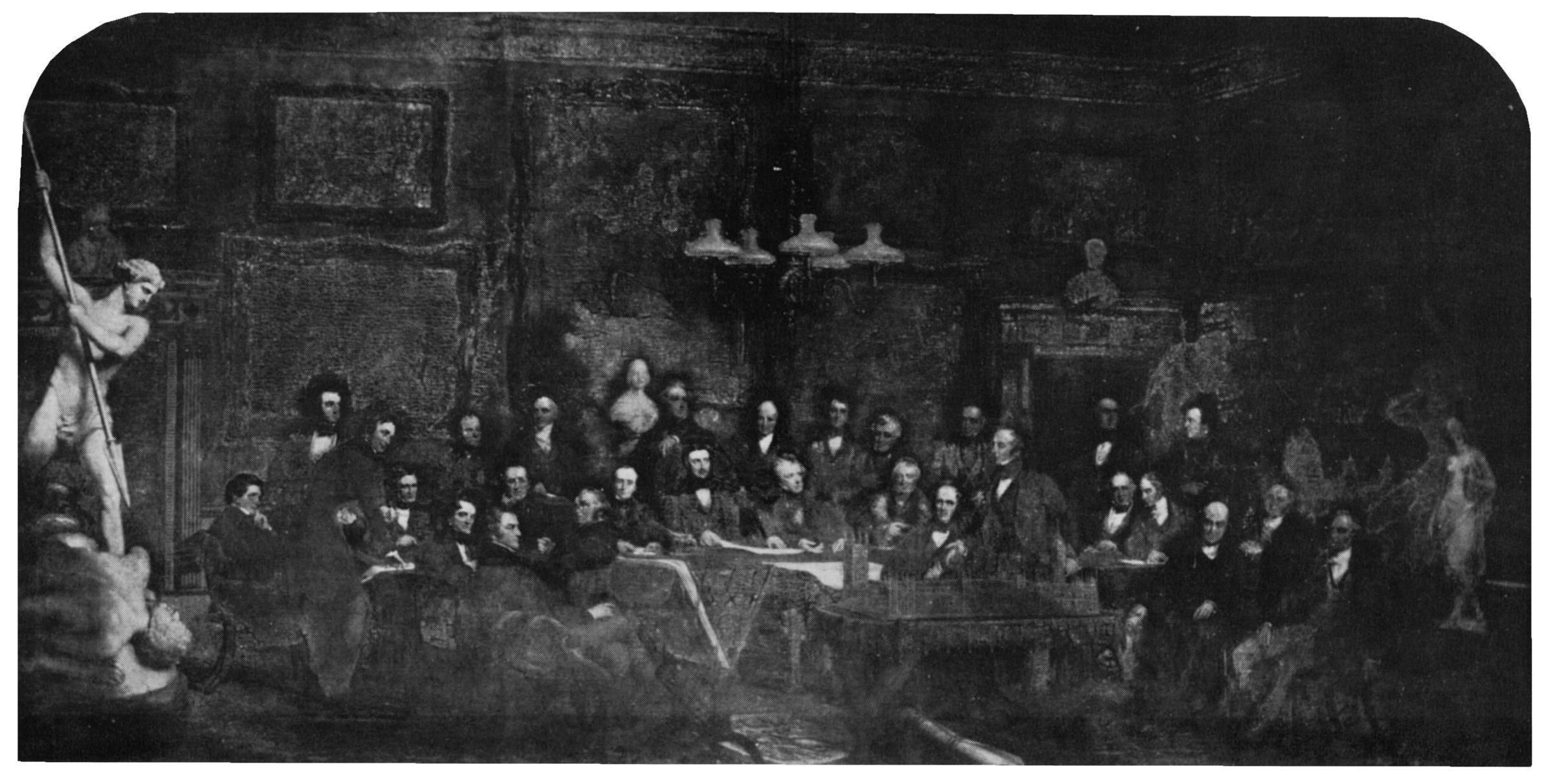
The Fine Arts Commission in 1846, by John Partridge

Vivian was a Commissioner for the plans to rebuild the Houses of Parliament in 1835, and became a member of the Society of Dilettanti in 1837. In the period before his marriage, he visited Germany, Scandinavia and Russia. He studied monumental art in Munich. He sat on the Royal Fine Art Commission from 1841 to 1863, the whole period of its existence. The Commission arose from an initial proposal and Select Committee of Benjamin Hawes, to couple the rebuilding of the Houses of Parliament with a national promotion of the fine arts. Vivian had shown that committee arabesques from the Palazzo del Te. In a group of 22 dominated by noblemen, patrons and politicians, Vivian represented connoisseurs and collectors, alongside Samuel Rogers and Thomas Wyse.

After contracting malaria in the Campagna in 1846, Vivian never again enjoyed perfect health. He died on 5 January 1873, at 11 Grosvenor Square, London and was buried in Brompton Cemetery. His library was put up for sale in 1875.

== Works ==
Vivian published illustrated books, mostly based on his own drawings.

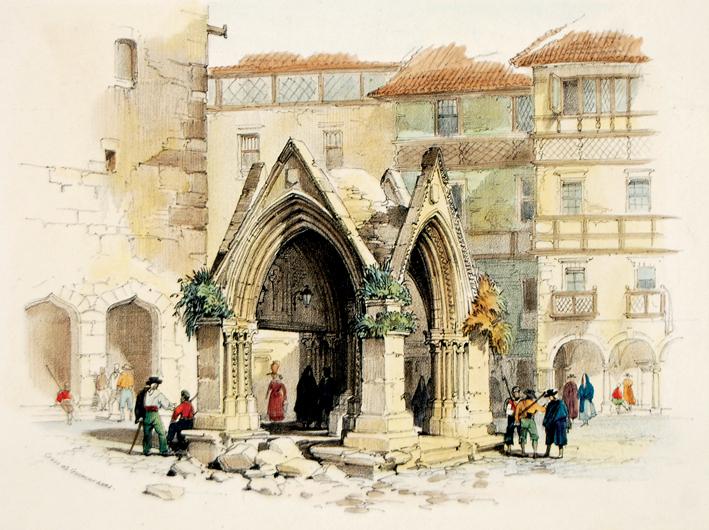
- Market place in Oliveira, Guimarães, plate from Scenery of Portugal and Spain
  Some Illustrations of the Architecture of Claverton and of the Duke's House, Bradford, etc. (1837). The plates were lithographs by Vivian, mostly from architectural drawings by Charles James Richardson (but Richardson was only 14 years old when the Old Manor was destroyed and George Vivian is likely to have made the drawings). Richardson's Observations on the architecture of England during the reigns of Queen Elizabeth and King James I of the same year is a related work having plates in common, dedicated to Vivian, and published by John Weale.
- Spanish Scenery (1838), lithographs by Louis Haghe and others.
- Scenery of Portugal and Spain (1839), lithographs by Louis Haghe, William Day and others.
- Views from the Gardens of Rome and Albano (1848), engravings by James Duffield Harding.

James Duffield Harding was a friend of Vivian and is considered to have influenced the latter's style.

Vivian wrote articles on architecture for the Quarterly Review. John Britton commented favourably in 1840 on his anonymous pamphlet The Prospects of Art in the Future Parliament House from 1835, which presaged the Fine Art Commission.

== Claverton Manor and the Vivians ==
John Vivian, father of George, purchased the Claverton Manor estate in 1816; he brought in Jeffry Wyatt to remodel the manor house, but Wyatt persuaded him to build a new house on an elevated site.

=== John Vivian ===
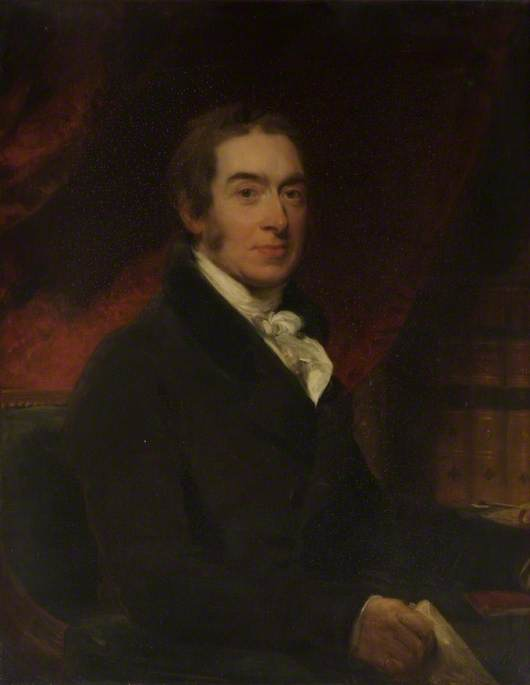
John Vivian

John Vivian (1756–1828), from a Cornish background, matriculated at St Mary Hall, Oxford in 1779, at age 22, graduating M.A. in 1784. He was called to the bar at the Inner Temple in 1785, the same year becoming solicitor to the Excise at Bristol, and later being made a bencher of the Middle Temple. (A correction to Bibliotheca Cornubiensis differentiates the Excise solicitor John Vivian from John Vivian of the Inner Temple; but that distinction is contradicted by the website of the American Museum and Gardens, located in Claverton Manor.)

He married Marianne Edwards in 1792, and they had a son John Edwards Vivian (born 1795/6) who was called to the bar at the Middle Temple in 1815. She was the daughter and heiress of Samuel Edwards of Cotham Lodge, in Gloucestershire near Bristol, who died in 1815.

The Alumni Oxonienses record for George Vivian gives, for 1817, his father's residence as "Colham, Gloucestershire". This presumably means "Cotham". Marianne Vivian died in Portland Place, London in 1826, and John died there in 1828, aged 73.

=== The two houses at Claverton ===
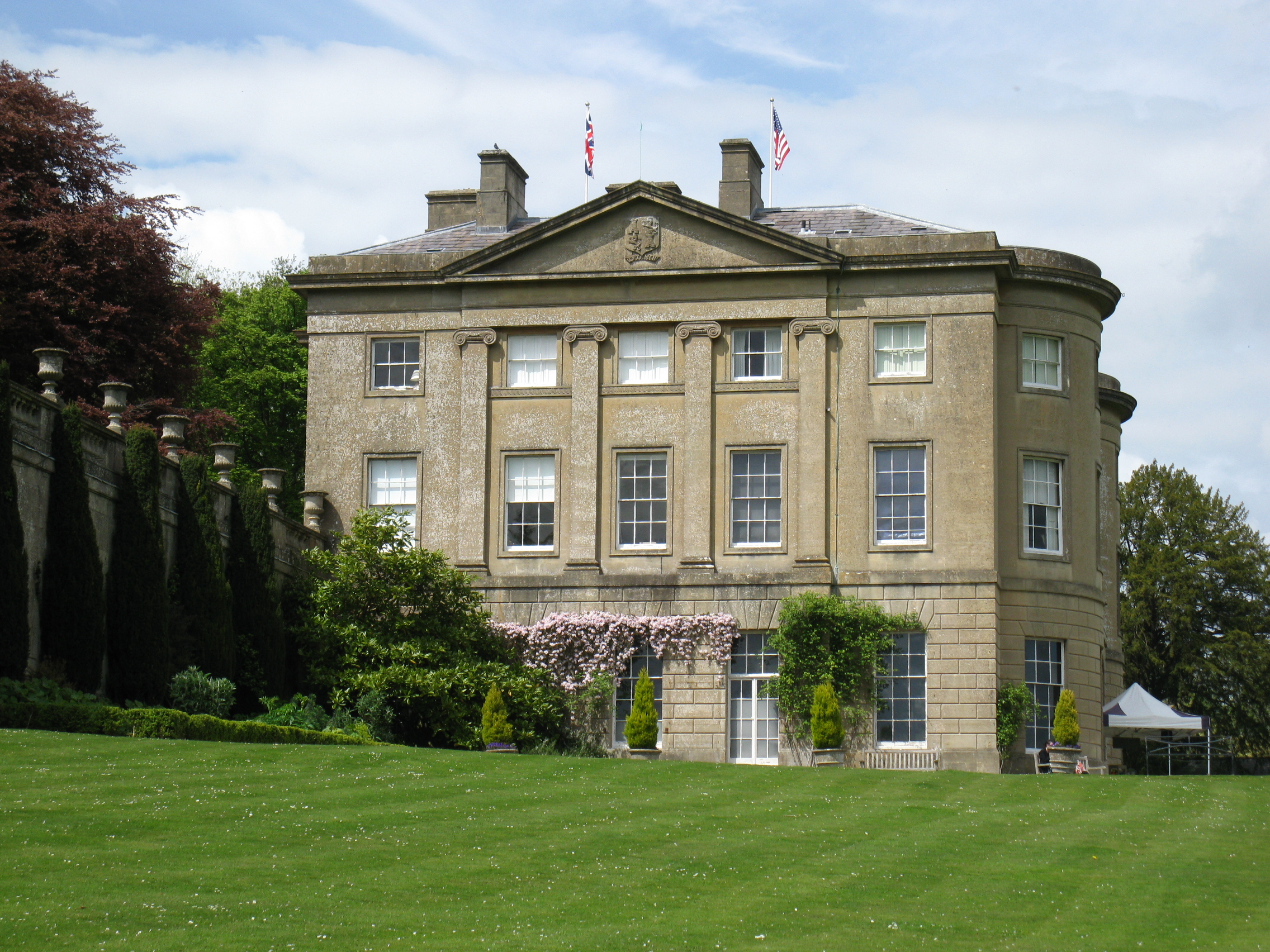
The new Manor of 1816 at Claverton, now a museum, in 2010

The new Manor commissioned by John Vivian was on a fresh site, some 400 metres (1,300 ft) away from the old house, and built in a neo-classical style, using Bath stone. George Vivian, in contrast, undertook to preserve what he could of the old house, completed in 1625.

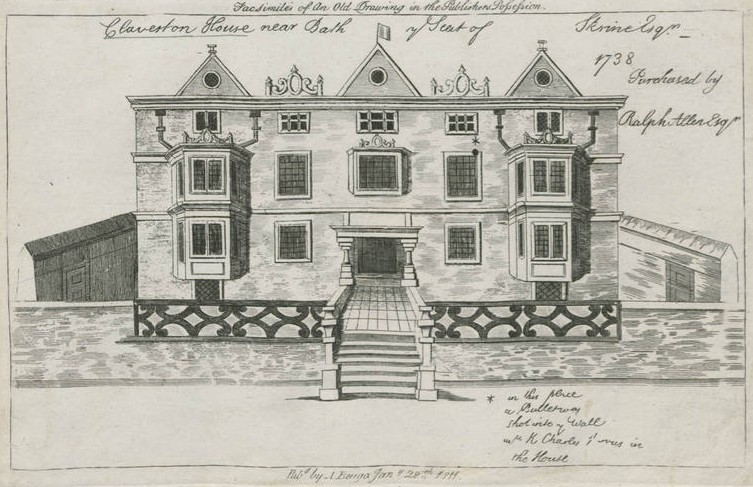
The old Manor at Claverton, 1811 copy of drawing

The old Manor became a noted example of Jacobean architecture, documented in some of its details by Richardson's 1837 book on the period. The architect Alexander Roos came to know Vivian by the early 1840s.

=== George Vivian as collector ===
Vivian added a gallery in the south wing of Claverton Manor, to display his art collection. He was a significant collector, owning in particular The Introduction of the Cult of Cybele at Rome by Andrea Mantegna, now in the National Gallery, London; he acquired it from the Venetian dealer Antonio Sanquirico. Under the original title Triumph of Scipio, it was exhibited several times. A supposed portrait of Michelangelo by Andrea del Sarto was later exhibited by his son, around 1880, as by Sebastiano del Piombo, based on an attribution by Bernard Berenson. It went to the Isabella Stewart Gardner Museum in 1899, was attributed there to Baccio Bandinelli, and is now taken to be a self-portrait of his.

=== Later history ===
Since 1961 Claverton Manor has been the home of the American Museum, and its 30 acres of gardens are open to the public. All that remains of the old house is part of the garden, with a 17th-century gateway, walls, and a flight of steps.

== Family ==
Vivian married in 1842 Elizabeth Anne Grey, eldest daughter of Ralph William Grey (died 1822) of Backworth House, and sister of Ralph William Grey (1819–1869) the Member of Parliament. The Greys of Backworth, in the Tynemouth area, owned coal rights, and were bought out by Hugh Percy, 2nd Duke of Northumberland. The Grey family also lived in Weymouth Street off Portland Place in London, in 1809.

George and Elizabeth Anne Vivian lived in Italy from 1844 to 1846, and their only son Ralph, who became an army officer, was born there. Their daughter Minna Frances married in 1888 the Revd Vivian Eccles Skrine. Their other daughter, Alice Jane, died unmarried in 1921. Charles George Vivian, son of Vivian's younger brother the Revd Charles Pasley Vivian who died in 1841, entered Rugby School in 1847 as Vivian's ward.

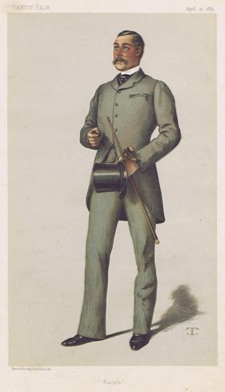
Ralph Vivian, 21 April 1883 Vanity Fair caricature by 'T' (Théobald Chartran (1849-1907))

Ralph Vivian (1845–1924) served in the Scots Guards in the British Conquest of Egypt (1882). He retired from the Army in 1883, and became a director of the machine tool company Greenwood & Batley in 1888. In 1892 he married Susan Lawrence née Endicott, widow of Marshall Owen Roberts.
