= Thomas Povey =

Thomas Povey (1613/14 – in or before 1705) FRS, was a London merchant-politician. He was active in colonial affairs from the 1650s, but neutral enough in his politics to be named a member from 1660 of Charles II's Council for Foreign Plantations. A powerful figure in the not-yet professionalised First English Empire, he was both "England's first colonial civil servant" and at the same time "a typical office holder of the Restoration". Both Samuel Pepys and William Berkeley, Governor of Virginia, railed at times against Povey's incompetence and maladministration.

== Life ==
The son of Justinian Povey of London, he was educated at Gray's Inn. He was a cousin of Thomas Povey, Lieutenant Governor of Massachusetts, and of Sir John Povey, Lord Chief Justice of Ireland.

Povey became Member of Parliament for Liskeard in 1646, Bossiney in 1659 and held under Oliver Cromwell a high post in the Office of Plantations. Following the Restoration, he was appointed in July 1660 Treasurer to the king's brother James, Duke of York, but with the Duke's affairs falling into confusion, Povey was relieved of his office, 27 July 1668, for a consideration of £2000. He was First Treasurer to the Lords Commissioner for Tangier, a lucrative post in which he was followed by the conscientious Samuel Pepys, organiser of the English navy. Povey made an agreement with Pepys in 1665, touching the profits expected from that office by the 17th-century convention. Years later, in 1691, Povey brought suit against Pepys and William Hewer at the Court of Chancery with reference to a breach of the agreement; it seems to have been settled out of court.

Povey family interests in the English Caribbean were extensive: Thomas's brother Richard Povey looked after the family interests in Jamaica, where he was officially Commissioner General for Provisions, while another brother, William, attended to affairs in Barbados, where he was officially Provost-General.

Povey was one of the original members of the Royal Society in May 1663 and had acted in the interests of its less formalised predecessor at Gresham College. Povey proposed Samuel Pepys for membership on 8 February 1665.

John Evelyn, a fellow member of the Royal Society, found Povey "a nice contriver of all elegancies and exceedingly formal". As a Fellow, Povey offered the Royal Society a dissertation in 1693 on the manufacture of brass. Povey presented a report on Louis XIV's Hôtel des Invalides, which Charles II emulated in the Royal Hospital Chelsea, under a Royal Warrant of 22 December 1681.

Povey had apartments in Whitehall Palace by virtue of his Crown posts. Robert Streater painted a ceiling in Povey's London house, on the west side of Lincoln's Inn Fields; there John Evelyn visited him in July 1664:

Went to see Mr Povey's elegant house in Lincolns-Inn-Fields, where the perspective in his court, painted by Streater, is indeed excellent, with the vases painted in imitation of porphy and fountains...

Pepys noted with approval Povey's neatly fitted up stables, lined with washable Delft tiles. Povey also inherited from his father Hounslow Priory, situated in a suburban village west of London; it was sold in 1671, and by the end of the 18th century only the chapel remained. He donated to the Royal Society the portrait that he asserted was of the historian George Buchanan and by Titian. In his court appointment as Master of Requests, 1675–85, he received petitions and presented them for consideration by the Privy Council.

Povey advanced the early career of his nephew William Blathwayt, and it is surely due to his influence that his son-in-law Giles Bland was sent to Virginia as customs collector. Some of the paintings from Povey's collection, which hung in his London house or at Hounslow, remain in Blathwayt's house, Dyrham Park, Gloucestershire. Povey's letter books are conserved in the British Library.

== Family ==
He married Mary, daughter of John Adderly and widow of John Agard of King's Bromley, Staffordshire. His daughter Sarah married another member of the Staffordshire gentry, Robert Leveson of Wolverhampton and had three sons, including the soldier and politician Richard Leveson. Another daughter Sarah married Giles Bland, who was executed for treason in Virginia in 1677, having played a leading part in Bacon's Rebellion the previous year.
