= Dallas Pratt =

American physician

- Born: August 21, 1914; Islip, New York, U.S.
- Died: May 20, 1994 (aged 79); New York, U.S.
- Education: Yale and Columbia Universities
- Occupation: Psychiatrist
- Partner: John Judkyn
- Parent(s): Alexander Dallas Bache Pratt, Beatrice Mai Benjamin

Dallas Pratt (August 21, 1914 – May 20, 1994) was an American psychiatrist, animal rights campaigner, and co-founder of the American Museum in Britain.

== Background ==
Pratt was born Islip, New York. His mother, Beatrice (Benjamin) Cartwright, was the granddaughter of the Standard Oil magnate Henry Huttleston Rogers (1840-1909). His father, Alexander Dallas Bache Pratt (1883-1947), and mother divorced when Dallas was three years old. His sister, Cynthia Anne (Pratt) Laughlin, was two years his senior. Standard Oil (now Exxon) was founded with J.D. Rockefeller. Dallas inherited a share of this wealth and also the family tradition of public benefaction on a grand scale. He felt that this helped justify great inequalities of wealth, though he knew that not everybody necessarily shared this view.[1]His unusual name came from his ancestor, Alexander James Dallas, who was Secretary of the US Treasury under President James Madison, and after whom Dallas, Texas was named.[2]ed.

== Education and career ==
He attended Buckley School, Aiken Preparatory School in South Carolina (1924-1927), and St. Paul's School, Concord, New Hampshire (1927-1932). On graduating from Yale University, where he majored in English, in 1936, he took a year off and travelled throughout Europe and Asia studying art and architecture. In 1937 in England, he met the British Quaker John Judkyn (1913-1963) who became his life partner and co-founder of the American Museum. On his return Dallas attended Columbia University and Bellevue Hospital, New York and qualified as a physician and a psychiatrist.

It was as a psychiatrist that he served in the US Army Medical Corps during World War II and later continued to practise on the staff of Columbia University, counselling foreign students, and at St. Luke's Hospital, New York. Pratt retained links with Columbia University acting as editor and contributor to Columbia Library Columns for 30 years.

== Animal welfare ==
Dr Pratt's lifelong affection for animals developed into a passionate concern for their welfare, but, ever the moderate, he attempted to persuade rather than harangue the public and scientific establishment. In 1969 he established Argus Archives, the purpose of which was to disseminate information on the plight of animals, particularly in slaughterhouses and laboratories. He wrote and published two books on animal experiments in the US, the first a survey, the second suggesting alternative, less painful techniques. His commitment to animal welfare earned him the Albert Schweitzer medal, presented to him at the White House in 1981, and the Annual Award from the New York Humane Society. Argus Archives later changed its name to The Two Mauds, named after Maud Duke, his childhood governess, and Maud Pratt, his Scots terrier.

== Collector ==
From boyhood Dallas Pratt was a collector, one of his first prized items being a life mask of John Keats that he persuaded his grandfather to give him – he later recalled how he ran from the room clutching the mask lest his grandfather, William Evarts Benjamin, change his mind. Dallas recalled: "When I started my own Keats collection in the 1930s, grandfather kept saying that someday he would give me the mask. For several years he tantalised me with this remark, but the gift never materialised. Finally when I was telling him about a Keats manuscript I had recently acquired from A.S.W. Rosenbach – 31 lines from the first draft of 'I stood tip-toe upon a little hill’ – he said, ‘I really must give you that mask'. He went off on another tack but before he had finished the sentence I marched into the dressing-room, lifted the mask from the wall, and with much feeling thanked him for the wonderful gift. He didn't explode, but he was surely taken aback by this act of bravado on the part of his habitually meek grandson. Still, as all collectors know, great acquisition can often only be won by heroic measures (usually financial!)".

=== Literary collection ===
Pratt's collection of books, manuscripts and literary items was formed in the 1930s. In 1971 he presented most of his collection of Keats memorabilia to the Keats-Shelley Memorial House in Rome.

=== Map collection (The Dallas Pratt Collection of Historical Maps) ===
At the age of eighteen, Pratt bought his first antique maps from a bookstall on the left bank of the Seine in Paris. “My eye was caught,” he wrote, “by three colourful maps. One was of the world, with fat-cheeked wind-puffers, one of the western hemisphere with a cannibal’s ‘lunch’ dangling from a Brazilian woodpile, and the third depicted an upside-down Europe with south at the top. Who could resist?”

In 1988 he gave his collection of 200 maps to the American Museum and designed the Map Room to exhibit the maps and related material dating mostly from the Renaissance and Age of Discovery.

=== The Compassionate Eye ===
This collection, which grew out of Pratt’s concern for animal welfare, was begun in the 1980s. It consists of 150 prints depicting the sympathetic relationship between human beings and animals. It was displayed in its entirety for the first time in 2012 at the American Museum; The Compassionate Eye – Birds and Beats from the American Museum’s Print Collection (10 March – 1 July) curated by Laura Beresford.

Pratt also had literary interests: he kept a journal from his early years, published two books of poetry and two pioneering studies Painful Experiments on Animals (1976) and Alternatives to Pain in Experiments on Animals (1980).

== The American Museum in Britain ==
In the 1950s, Pratt and his partner John Judkyn became aware "that the media has helped to produce a distorted conception of the transatlantic experience and that the treatment of American history in British textbooks had tended to be scant and unbalanced. They had long regretted that no museum in Europe presented an authentic picture of American culture. They decided to remedy this". Whilst touring museum-restorations in country settings in New England and the Mid-Atlantic states, such as Winterthur, Dallas and John had the idea of creating a similar museum in Britain. "At this stage", Dallas wrote, "my desire was simply to share with the British the aesthetic charm of early American furniture and decorative art and their historical background. John added a concern of his own: to inform the British of the outstanding achievements in these arts and crafts … There is a shade of difference here between myself as prospective museum exhibitor and John as educator and promoter of Anglo-American understanding. Both motivations merged in the outcome".

The American Museum in Britain (now branded as the American Museum and Gardens) is housed in Claverton Manor, a large house built in 1820 in the outskirts of Bath. The museum opened to the public in July 1961, and in 2011 celebrated its 50th anniversary with an exhibition of Marilyn Monroe's dresses and artefacts from the David Gainsborough Roberts' Collection.

== Personal life ==
Dr. Dallas Pratt and John Judkyn “were an Anglo-American couple, Partners in both their personal and collecting lives,” according to the website of the American Museum & Gardens in the United Kingdom, which the two men founded together. Pratt had homes in America, France and England. He died from cancer at his home in New York on May 20, 1994, at age 79.
