= Secretary at War =

Historical English political position

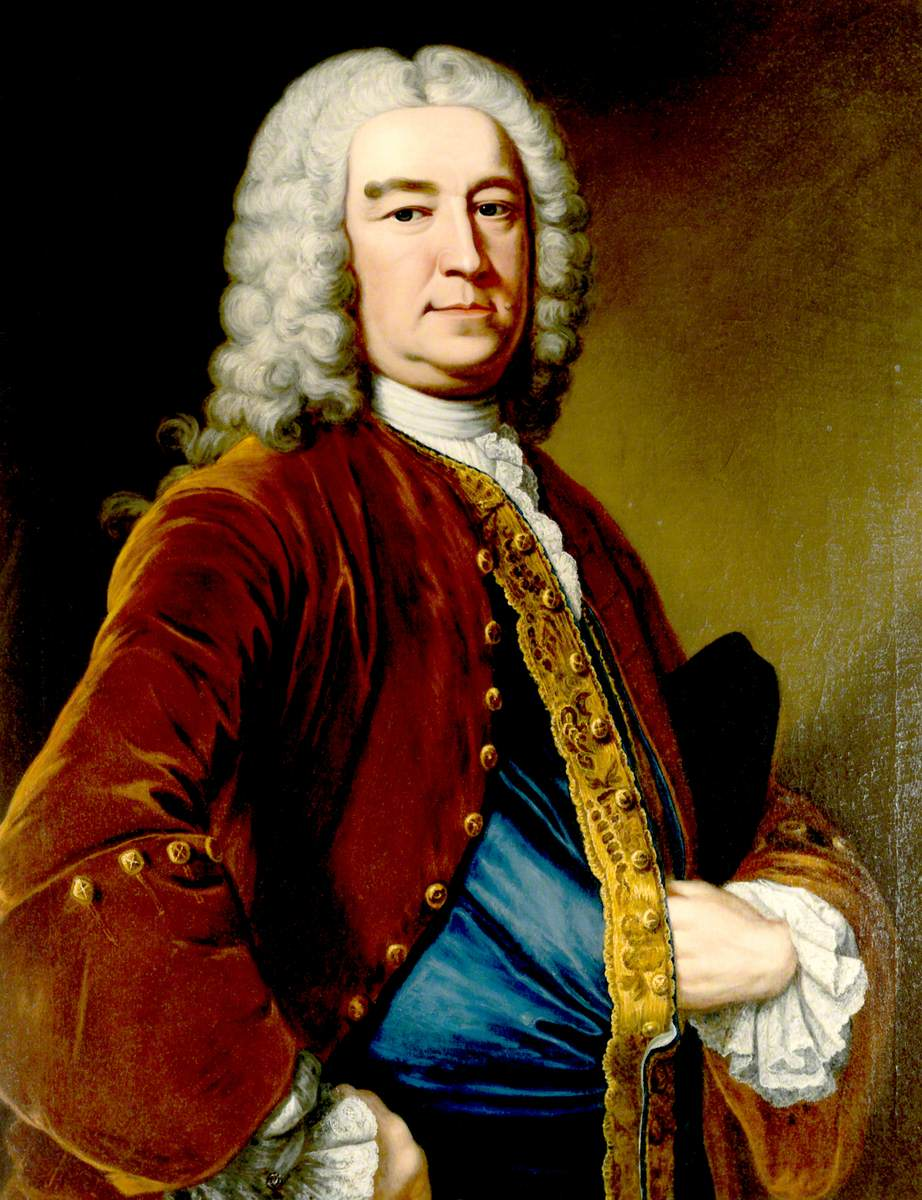
Henry Pelham, who served as Secretary at War between 1724 and 1730

The secretary at war was a political position in the English and later British government, with some responsibility over the administration and organization of the Army, but not over military policy. The Secretary at War ran the War Office. After 1794 it was occasionally a Cabinet-level position, although it was considered of subordinate rank to the secretary of state for war. The position was combined with that of secretary of state for war in 1854 and abolished in 1863.

Notable holders of the position include Henry St John, 1st Viscount Bolingbroke, Robert Walpole, Henry Pelham, Henry Fox, Henry John Temple, 3rd Viscount Palmerston, William Windham and Thomas Babington Macaulay, 1st Baron Macaulay.

== Secretaries at war, 1661–1854 ==
Name	Entered office	Left office
Sir William Clarke	1661	1666
Matthew Locke	1666	1683
William Blathwayt	1683	1692
George Clarke	1692	1704
Henry St John	1704	1708
Robert Walpole	1708	1710
George Granville	1710	1712
Sir William Wyndham, 3rd Baronet	1712	1713
Francis Gwyn	1713	1714
William Pulteney	1714	1717
James Craggs the Younger	1717	1718
Christopher Wandesford, 2nd Viscount Castlecomer	1718	1718
Robert Pringle	1718	1718
George Treby	1718	1720
Thomas Trevor	1720	1724
Henry Pelham	1724	1730
Sir William Strickland, 4th Baronet	1730	1735
Sir William Yonge, 4th Baronet	1735	1741
Thomas Winnington	1741	1746
Henry Fox	1746	1755
William Barrington, 2nd Viscount Barrington	1755	1761
Charles Townshend	1761	1762
Welbore Ellis	1762	1765
William Barrington, 2nd Viscount Barrington	1765	1778
Charles Jenkinson	1778	1782
Thomas Townshend	1782	1782
Sir George Yonge, 5th Baronet	1782	1783
Richard FitzPatrick	1783	1783
Sir George Yonge, 5th Baronet	1783	1794
William Windham	1794	1801
Charles Philip Yorke	1801	1803
Charles Bragge	1803	1804
William Dundas	1804	1806
Richard FitzPatrick	1806	1807
Sir James Murray-Pulteney, 7th Baronet	1807	1809
Lord Granville Leveson-Gower	1809	1809
Henry John Temple, 3rd Viscount Palmerston	1809	1828
Sir Henry Hardinge	1828	1830
Lord Francis Leveson-Gower	1830	1830
Charles Williams-Wynn	1830	1831
Sir Henry Parnell, 4th Baronet	1831	1832
Sir John Hobhouse, 2nd Baronet	1832	1833
Edward Ellice	1833	1834
John Charles Herries	1834	1835
Henry Grey, Viscount Howick	1835	1839
Thomas Babington Macaulay	1839	1841
Sir Henry Hardinge	1841	1844
Sir Thomas Fremantle, 1st Baronet	1844	1845
Sidney Herbert	1845	1846
Fox Maule	1846	1852
Robert Vernon Smith	1852	1852
William Beresford	1852	1852
Sidney Herbert	1852	1854

== Secretaries of state for war and secretaries at war, 1854–1863 ==
Name	Entered office	Left office
Henry Pelham-Clinton, 5th Duke of Newcastle	1854	1855
Fox Maule-Ramsay, Baron Panmure	1855	1858
Jonathan Peel	1858	1859
Sidney Herbert, 1st Baron Herbert of Lea	1859	1861
Sir George Cornewall Lewis, 2nd Baronet	1861	1863
