= Samuel Trotman (1650–1720) =

English politician (1650–1720)

Samuel Trotman (23 February 1650 – 6 February 1720) was an English lawyer and Tory politician. He sat as MP for Bath from 20 February 1707 till his death on 6 February 1720.

== Family and education ==
He was the first son of Samuel Trotman (died 1685) and his second wife Mary, daughter of Samuel Warcup. He was matriculated at Exeter College, Oxford in 1663, he entered the Inner Temple and was called to the bar in 1671 and became a bencher in 1682. He married his first wife Dorothea, daughter of Robert Dring and they had one daughter. On 15 December 1691, his marriage to his second wife, Elizabeth, daughter of Sir William Montagu and widow of Sir William Drake, 1st Baronet was licensed and they had one daughter who predeceased him.

== Political career ==
In October 1690, he first contested Bath in a by-election but was unsuccessful. In November 1693, he announced his candidacy for another by-election but withdrew in favour of William Blathwayt. In 1694, he was appointed a deputy lieutenant. Throughout the 1690s, he repeatedly failed to get elected to Bath. In February 1707, he was elected to Bath in a by-election.

In early 1710, he voted against the impeachement of Dr Henry Sacheverell. On 6 February 1720, he died while still serving as MP for Bath.

In 1719, he served as governor of St. Bartholomew's Hospital.
