= Susan Powers =

American artist

- Born: 1954 (age 71–72); Glen Cove, New York, U.S.
- Education: University of Vermont
- Occupation: Artist

Susan Powers (born 1954 in Glen Cove, New York) is a self-taught American artist.

== Education ==
Powers attended the University of Vermont, where she studied classical languages and medieval history, graduating in 1976 with a Bachelor of Arts degree in European Studies.

== Career ==
Powers began painting in 1979, encouraged by a friend and fellow painter who had seen her expressive pencil drawings. Only a year later, her work had been accepted for display by the prestigious Jay Johnson Folk Heritage Gallery in New York City. In 1980, Powers spent a year in England and France developing her craft, before returning to the U.S.

The folk art still lifes of Susan Powers have been compared with the trompe-l'œil works of the well-known 19th-century American academic artist William Harnett. Like Harnett, Powers is fascinated with common everyday objects—books, seashells, bottles, and teapots—and she renders them in a manner so lifelike they ‘fool the eye’ of the viewer, almost leading the viewer to believe that the objects themselves are present on the canvas. The trompe-l'œil technique is uncommon with folk artists: some folk artists cannot produce a photograph-like image.

Her paintings are in many permanent collections, including the Smithsonian Institution in Washington, D.C., and the American Museum in Bath, England. Her works have been exhibited in numerous museums, including the Bede Gallery, Jarrow, England, the Woodspring Museum, Weston-super-Mare, England, the Camden Arts Center, London, the Haworth Art Gallery, London, and at the White House in Washington, D.C.

== Artwork ==
Flowers in a Cricket Box Copyright - Susan Powers - 2007

” The still lifes of Susan Powers have been compared
with the trompe-l'œil works of the well-known 19th–century
American academic artist William Harnett. Like Harnett,
Powers is fascinated with common everyday objects—
books seashells, bottles, and teapots—and she
renders them in a manner so lifelike they ‘fool the eye’
of the viewer, almost leading the viewer to believe that the
objects themselves are present on the canvas. The
trompe-l'œil technique is uncommon with folk artists:
some folk artists cannot produce a photograph-like image...”

American Folk Art of the Twentieth Century
Jay Johnson & William C. Ketchum Jr.
(Rizzoli International, New York, NY 1983)

== Additional sources ==
- Johnson, Jay & Ketchum, William, American Folk Art of the Twentieth Century. Rizzoli International: 1983. ISBN 0-8478-0503-4.
