= William Bassett (died 1693) =

English landowner and politician

Sir William Bassett (1628 – 25 September 1693) was an English landowner and politician who sat in the House of Commons between 1669 and 1693.

Bassett was the son of William Bassett of Claverton, near Bath, and his second wife Elizabeth Killigrew, daughter of Sir Joseph Killigrew of Lothbury, London and Landrake, Cornwall. He was baptised on 17 April 1628. He succeeded to the estate of Claverton on the death of his father in 1656. He was knighted on 7 July 1660 and was one of those recommended as Knight of the Royal Oak with an estate of £1,800 per annum. He was a commissioner for assessment for Somerset from August 1660 to 1680. In 1661 he was made freeman of Bath and was also a captain of militia horse for Somerset. He became J.P. for Somerset in 1662.

In 1669, Bassett was elected Member of Parliament for Bath in the Cavalier Parliament. He was commissioner for recusants for Somerset in 1675. By 1679 he was a major in the militia, He was re-elected MP for Bath in first election of 1679, but lost his seat in the second election that year. He was Deputy Lieutenant from 1680 to 1687. In 1681 he was elected MP for Bath again. He became a member of the Honourable Artillery Company in 1681. He was J.P. for Cornwall from 1683 to 1685 and for Bath from 1684 to October 1688. In 1685 he was re-elected MP for Bath, and again in 1689. From 1689 to 1690 he was commissioner for assessment for Somerset and became Deputy Lieutenant for Somerset in 1689. He was commissioner for assessment for Bath in 1690. In 1690 he was re-elected MP for Bath.

Bassett died at the age of about 65 and was buried at Claverton.

Bassett married firstly Philadelphia Cambell, daughter of James Cambell of Woodford, Essex, and coheir to her brother Sir John Cambell, 1st Baronet. She died without issue and he married secondly on 28 September 1685, Rachel Biddulph, daughter of Sir Theophilus Biddulph of Westcombe Park, Greenwich, Kent.

Parliament of England
Preceded by Alexander Popham; Sir Francis Popham	Member of Parliament for Bath; 1669–1679; With: Sir Francis Popham 1669–1679; Sir George Speke 1675–1679	Succeeded by Sir Walter Long; Sir George Speke
Preceded by Sir Walter Long; Sir George Speke	Member of Parliament for Bath; 1681–1693; With: The Viscount Fitzhardinge 1681–1690; Joseph Langton 1690–1693	Succeeded by William Blathwayt; Joseph Langton
