= Surveyor and Auditor-General of the Plantations =

The Surveyor and Auditor-General of His Majesty's Revenue in America (often shortened to Surveyor and Auditor-General of the Plantations) was an office of the British Treasury that existed from 1680 to 1835. The holder was responsible for auditing and examining accounts of Crown revenues originating in the American colonies. After the death of the first incumbent, it increasingly took on the character of a sinecure. The loss of the Thirteen Colonies greatly decreased the revenue and duties associated with the office, and it became defunct in 1835.

== Description ==
The office was created by letters patent on 23 May 1680, and conferred during good behaviour upon William Blathwayt. Under the patent, he was given authority, under the Lord High Treasurer, the Lords Commissioners of the Treasury and the Chancellor of the Exchequer, to examine and audit all accounts of Crown revenue derived from territories in America, with the same powers as the Surveyor General of the Land Revenues of the Crown and the Auditor of the Receipt of the Exchequer enjoyed in England. He was given a salary of £500 per year, and allowed to appointed deputies to assist him in carrying out his duties.

Blathwayt, an energetic administrator who simultaneously occupied several other posts dealing with the colonies, appointed a deputy auditor in each colony as soon as occasion arose, and established an effective oversight of Crown revenues such as quit rents, the 4½ per cent export duties in Barbados, the 2s per hogshead duty on Virginia tobacco, and so on.

On Blathwayt's death, the office passed to Horatio Walpole, who had secured a reversionary interest in it some time before. The brother of Robert Walpole, Horatio held many other diplomatic and administrative posts during his brother's tenure as Prime Minister of Great Britain. The business of the auditor's office suffered accordingly, and while Blathwayt's administrative system continued to function, Walpole's accounts and exercise of oversight were much more sporadic. The process of degradation continued after Walpole's death in 1757. Around the time Walpole entered office, George Cholmondeley, 2nd Earl of Cholmondeley had obtained a reversionary grant of the post during his life and that of his sons. It was surrendered by his executors and regranted in 1752 to his younger grandson Robert Cholmondeley (also a grandson of Robert Walpole), who succeeded his great-uncle Horatio in the office. The intent was to provide Robert with the emoluments of the office as a sort of annuity, and he showed little application to his duties.

In 1770, Thomas Bradshaw, the Secretary of the Treasury, received from the outgoing Duke of Grafton, his patron, a reversionary grant of the office during his life and that of his son. It was anticipated to be valuable well beyond the official salary of the post, but this did not account for the outbreak of the American Revolution. The loss of the revenue from the Thirteen Colonies deprived the office of much of its pecuniary advantages. The extravagant Cholmondeley became a bankrupt and left the country, returning in 1784 when he obtained a pension of £400 per year from the commission on American Loyalist claims. He continued to hold the office in vestigial form, and was allotted £250 per year from the Barbados 4½ per cent duties.

On his death in 1804, the office passed to Thomas's son, Robert Haldane Bradshaw. The office became defunct upon his death in 1835.

== Surveyors and Auditors-General ==
- 1680–1717: William Blathwayt
- 1717–1757: Horatio Walpole, 1st Baron Walpole
- 1757–1804: Robert Cholmondeley
- 1804–1835: Robert Haldane Bradshaw
