= Lords of Trade and Plantations =

Permanent administrative body formed by Charles II in 1675

The Lords of Trade and Plantations was a permanent administrative body formed by Charles II in 1675 to provide consistent advice to the Privy Council regarding the management of the growing number of English colonies. It replaced a series of temporary committees which had been set up to run the colonies since 1624. Following the Restoration of Charles II there were separate committees for trade and plantations until 1672, when a committee combining both remits was established. In 1675, named the Lords of Trade and Plantations, the committee had gained a more stable form. It was structurally replaced by what is now called the Commissioners for Trade and Plantations in 1696, following the Glorious Revolution that ousted the Stuart monarch, although the commissioners were still regularly referred to as the Lords commissioners.

== Original appointees ==
The following people were appointed on 12 March 1675:

- Earl of Danby
- Earl of Anglesey
- Duke of Lauderdale
- Duke of Ormond
- Marquess of Worcester
- Earl of Ossory
- Earl of Arlington
- Earl of Bridgwater
- Earl of Essex
- Earl of Carlisle
- Earl of Craven
- Viscount of Fauconberg
- Viscount of Halifax
- Lord of Berkeley of Stratton
- Lord Holles
- Henry Savile
- Hon. Henry Coventry
- Sir Joseph Williamson
- Sir John Duncombe
- Sir R. Carr
- Sir Edward Seymour
