= Joseph Langton =

English politician

- Miniature from the collections of Corsham Court

Member of Parliament for Bath
- In office 1690–1695

Personal details
- Born: c. 1637
- Died: 17 March 1720

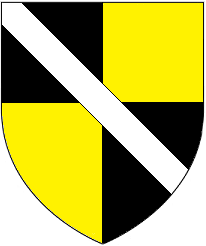
Arms of Langton: Quarterly sable and or, a bend argent

Sir Joseph Langton (c. 1637 – 17 March 1720), of Newton Park, near Bath, Somerset was an English politician. He was an ancestor of the Temple-Gore-Langton family, created in 1822 Earl Temple of Stowe.

== Biography ==
Joseph Langton was born in 1637, the younger brother of Thomas Langton, later Mayor of Bristol. He was High Sherriff of Bristol, a Bristol merchant trader and Member of Parliament for Bath from 1690 to 1695.

He brought Newton Park in 1680.

== Succession ==
His principal heir was his grandson, Joseph Langton, the son of his only surviving daughter by her first husband and cousin, Robert Langton. In 1762–1765 he rebuilt the mansion at Newton Park, which building survives today.
