= Capture of Belle Île =

1761 battle of the Seven Years' War

- Part of Seven Years' War
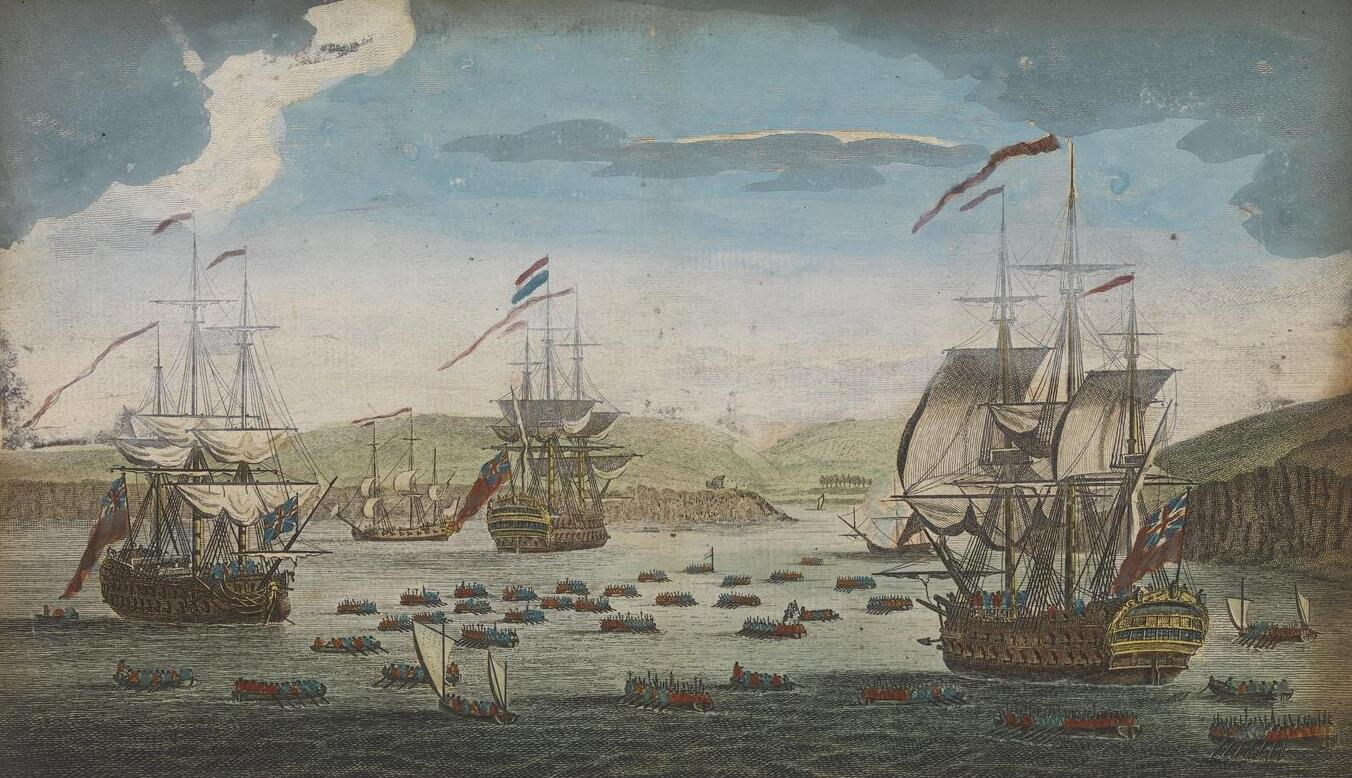
- 1761 engraving of the capture
Date	7 April – 8 June 1761
Location	Belle Île, Brittany 47.350°N 3.155°W
Result	British victory
Territorial changes	British occupation of Belle Île

Belligerents
Great Britain	France

Commanders and leaders
Studholme Hodgson; Augustus Keppel	Gaetan Xavier Guilhem de Pascalis Sainte-Croix (surrendered)

Strength
9,000	3,000

Casualties and losses
500+ killed, wounded or captured	Unknown

The capture of Belle Île was a British amphibious expedition to capture the French island of Belle Île off the Brittany coast in 1761, during the Seven Years' War. After an initial British attack was repulsed, a second attempt under General Studholme Hodgson forced a beachhead. A second landing was made, and after a six-week siege the island's main citadel at Le Palais was stormed, consolidating British control of the island. A French relief effort from the nearby mainland was unable to succeed because of British control of the sea. The British occupied the island for two years before returning it in 1763 following the Treaty of Paris.

== Background ==
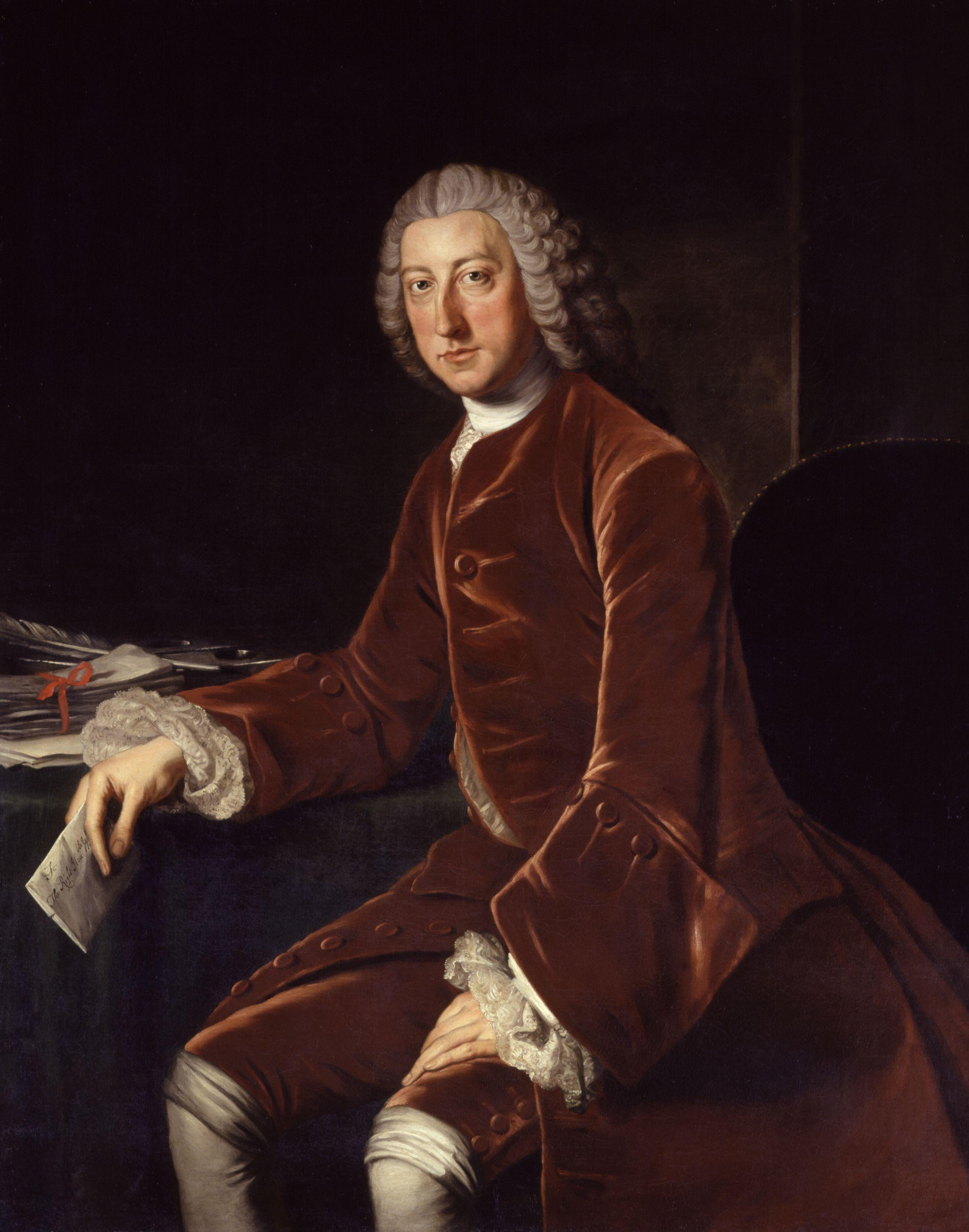
The Southern Secretary, William Pitt, was the author of the expedition against Belle Île and pushed ahead with it despite widespread doubt amongst his colleagues.

In 1756, Britain and France had formally gone to war after initial clashes in North America. The French began the war successfully by capturing Menorca, a British island in the Mediterranean. After this Britain had gained the initiative at sea and had begun a series of naval incursions on the French coast, such as the Raid on Rochefort (1757) and the Raid on Cherbourg (1758), pioneered by the Southern Secretary William Pitt. While the practical success of these was limited, they caused serious alarm throughout France and forced the French government to detach large numbers of troops to guard coastal areas against further British raids. Pitt suspended the campaign in late 1758 following an unsuccessful landing at Saint Cast, while remaining open to the idea of further operations against the vulnerable French coast.

In 1759, France attempted to launch a major invasion of Britain, but following the naval defeats of Lagos and Quiberon Bay and a near continuous British blockade of French ports, this plan had to be abandoned; for much of the remainder of the war the French navy remained at anchor. From 1757, the British launched a series of attacks on French colonies around the globe, leading many of them being captured. The Conquest of Canada in 1759-60 left Britain in control of a large area of formerly French territory, and Pitt anticipated that this would lead to a peace agreement, as many in Paris sought to bring an end to the costly war.

Pitt had planned to send an expedition to capture Mauritius, a major French naval base in the Indian Ocean. However, with the likelihood of a peace congress fast approaching Pitt wanted something more immediate and tangible which could be exchanged for captured British or German territory, rather than the Mauritius which would take a long time to capture and news of which would take months to reach Europe. He was also aware of Spain's potential entry into the war, which would also make it prudent to keep ships closer to home to protect against a possible invasion.

Pitt now decided to switch the focus of an expedition to the French coast. The island of Belle Île was located close to Lorient and the major naval centre of Brittany and offered command of the Bay of Biscay. He now advocated that it should be seized and turned into a British military base which could then be used as a staging point for further attacks on the French mainland. Pitt had originally proposed an attack on Belle Île in October 1760, but it was strongly opposed by the Duke of Newcastle and vetoed by King George II on the grounds that more focus should be given to the ongoing campaign in Germany. Pitt now revived the project, helped by the fact that the old King had died and been succeeded by his grandson.

Both Lord Anson and Sir Edward Hawke were opposed to such an expedition, but Pitt was not put off by the opposition of two of Britain's most respected admirals. On 25 March George III signed secret orders now making Belle Île the target. The command of the army was to be given to General Studholme Hodgson while Admiral Augustus Keppel, already experienced in amphibious operations from his role in the Capture of Goree, was to command the naval elements.

== Campaign ==
=== First landing ===
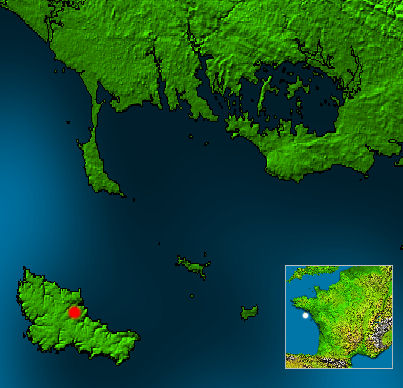
White dot: Location of Belle Île in France. Red dot: Location of the city Le Palais on Belle Île.

The expedition was assembled at Plymouth and sailed on 29 March 1761. It arrived off Belle Île, delayed by bad weather, on 6 April. After an initial reconnaissance of the southern end of the island it was decided to try the area around Port Andro on the south of Belle Île. A force was landed under General John Craufurd which attempted to make a landing. A feint was made to the north with two infantry battalions and a detachment of British marines in the hope of diverting French attention from Craufurd's force.

Craufurd's force encountered much heavier opposition than had been expected. The French were well-entrenched and their fire took a heavy toll on the British attackers. A company of British grenadiers managed to scale the nearby cliffs, but they were not supported, and many were killed or captured. Realising that they had lost any chance of surprise, and apparently faced with little alternative, Craufurd's troops abandoned the attempt and withdrew back to the ships, having suffered 500 casualties. A violent storm then blew up wrecking many of the landing craft vital for the operation. The expedition's commanders believed a further attempt was not practicable, and after further reconnaissance they wrote home to Pitt suggesting that no assault was now possible, raising the likelihood that the force should sail for home.

The immediate results of the attack resulted in dismay in both Paris and London. The French court were infuriated by the fact that Pitt had pressed ahead with the operation in spite of the ongoing peace talks, which they regarded as an act of bad faith. In Britain the failure was met with a mixture of resigned acceptance by opponents of the expedition, but Pitt pressed ahead with a second attempt. Troopships carrying troops destined to take part in the British invasion of Martinique were diverted to join Keppel along with significant reinforcements. Pitt was determined to secure the island as a principal objective in the global war.

=== Second landing ===
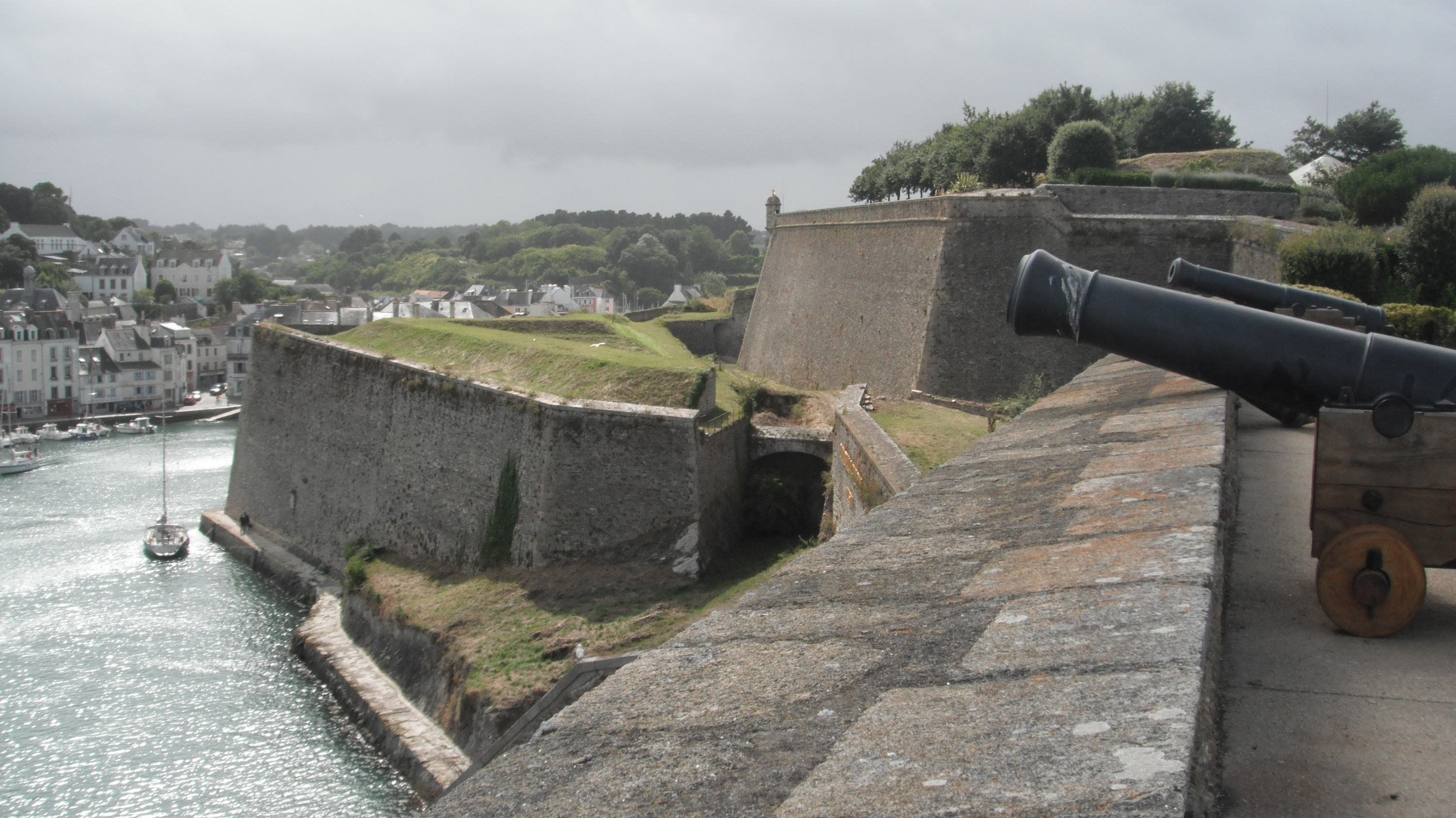
Present day view of the Vauban style citadel at Le Palais.

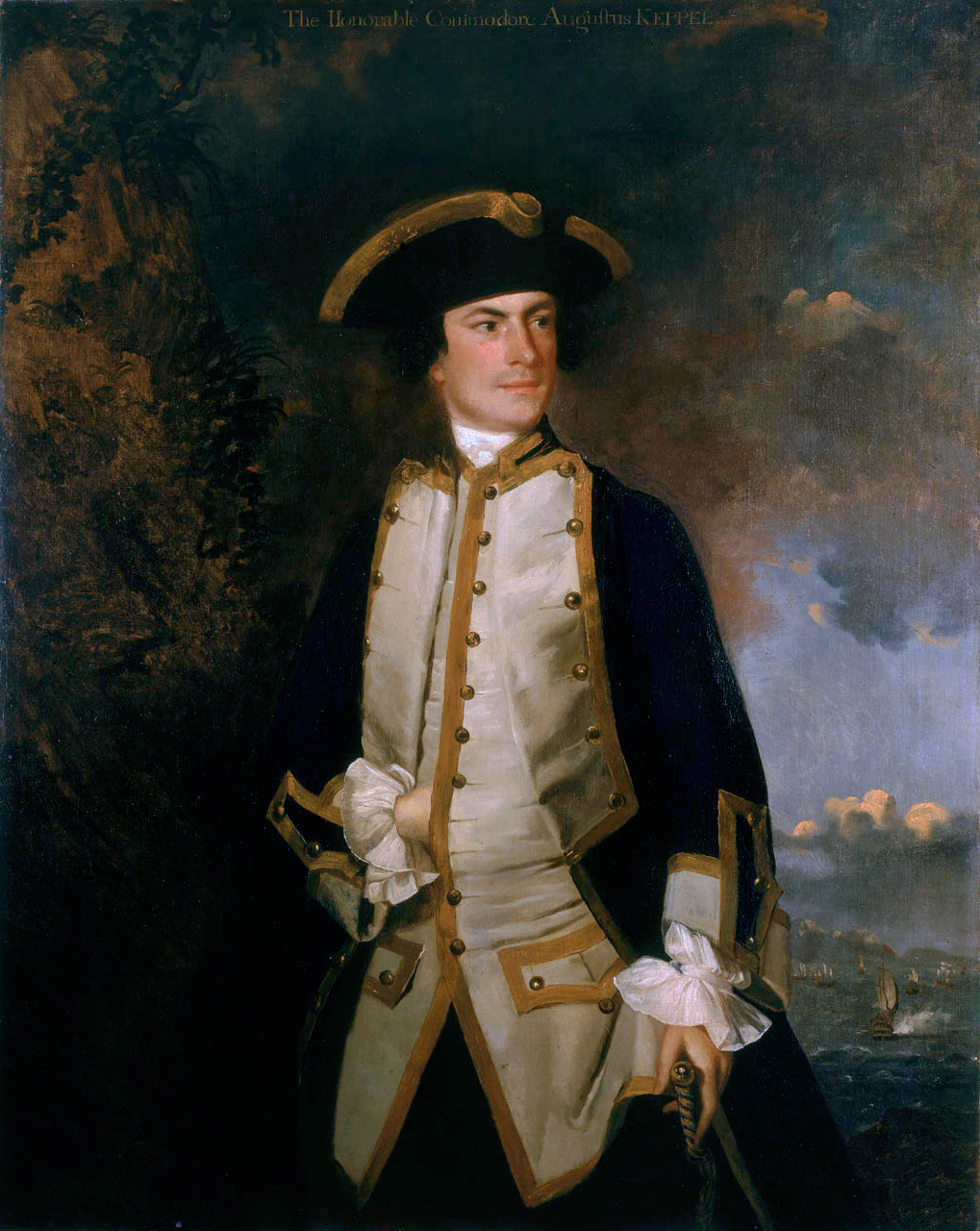
Augustus Keppel, the British naval commander

Now reinforced, a second landing was planned by Keppel and Hodgson. After lengthy examination of the island's defences it was decided that the best chance of success was another attack at Port Andro. This time two diversionary attacks were planned to draw attention away from the main effort with one in the west against Sauzon and one in the north against St Foy. On 22 April, the main attack, again led by John Craufurd, met equally heavy opposition as it had last time and soon stalled. Meanwhile, the diversionary attack to the north led by Brigadier Hamilton Lambart discovered the stretch of coast around St Foy undefended by troops as the French had believed that the high cliffs were a strong enough defence against any attack. Lambart decided that they could be scaled, and his troops successfully gained a position on top of the ridge. They beat off a counterattack from nearby French troops, receiving support from nearby Royal Navy ships.

Realising what had happened, Craufurd abandoned his attack and took his troops via boat around to assist Lambart. The British commanders poured further reinforcements in to secure the beachhead. By nightfall, the whole British force was ashore. According to a pre-arranged signal, the French forces and inhabitants withdrew into the main fortification at Le Palais leaving the rest of the island to the invaders. The British now occupied the island's defenceless ports allowing them to ship in fresh supplies and began to besiege Le Palais. The French commander on the island, Gaetan Xavier Guilhem de Pascalis Sainte-Croix, hoped that he would be able to resist at Le Palais long enough for some relief to reach him from the French mainland. The governor of Brittany Emmanuel Armand de Vignerot du Plessis, Duke of Aiguillon had gathered a force at Vannes with the intention of coming to the aid of Belle Île, but Royal Navy frigates kept a vigilant watch of the coast, and the British control of the surrounding seas made any chance of a crossing unlikely. The French government moved fresh reinforcements to mainland Brittany, suspecting that this would be the next target to be attacked.

A French attempt to ready a small fleet by activating seven ships of the line at Rochefort and eight at Brest was encountered by an even more vigorous blockade mounted by Keppel. On 8 June, after more than a month's siege of Le Palais, Sainte-Croix acknowledged he was unlikely to receive any rescue and he agreed to capitulate. Sainte-Croix was allowed, through convention, to march his men out through the breach with the honours of war and his force was then repatriated to nearby Lorient.

== British occupation ==
During British rule there were three governors or administrators:

=== John Craufurd ===
The first governor was John Craufurd, who was born in 1722. Son of Patrick Craufurd a merchant in Edinburgh. He commenced his duties on 24 December 1761.

=== Hamilton Lambart ===
John Craufurd departed Belle Isle on 17 March 1762 and was replaced by Brigadier Hamilton Lambart, holding the post of "Senior Officer".

=== James Forrester ===
On 21 June 1762, Lt.Col.James Forrester arrived in the island and took up his position as governor, in place of Lambart. The Deputy Governor was Lt Col. Thomas Oswald, Commandant of 103rd Regiment of Foot (Volunteer Hunters), who had taken part, alongside the Marines, in the capture of the island. The force was disbanded in England in 1763.

In accordance with the terms of the Treaty of Paris (1763), which was ratified on 10 March 1763, Forrester handed over to Richard Auguste de Warren, who had been appointed French commander, on 10 May 1763. Forrester and the British forces departed Belle Isle the next day.

== Aftermath ==
The initial French reaction to the island's fall was to tell the British they could keep it if they wanted but could expect no compensation if they handed it back. It was soon realised that this was not a plausible stance, as the island could be used as a base for privateers and the Royal Navy. Ultimately after two years of occupation, the island was handed back to France in the wake of the Treaty of Paris (1763), exchanged directly for the return of Menorca to Britain. Belle Île was then partially settled by Acadians deported from Acadia by British authorities between 1755 and 1764 as part of the Expulsion of the Acadians. The Acadians were unhappy with conditions there, and by 1785, most of them had emigrated to Spanish Louisiana.

== Keppel's squadron ==
- HMS Valiant 74 (flagship, Adam Duncan)
- HMS Sandwich 90 (Richard Norbury)
- HMS Dragon 74 (Augustus John Hervey)
- HMS Téméraire 74 (Matthew Barton)
- HMS Torbay 74 (William Brett)
- HMS Swiftsure 70 (Sir Thomas Stanhope)
- HMS Hampton Court 64 (Carr Scrope)
- HMS Essex 64 (Alexander Schomberg)
- HMS Prince of Orange 60 (Samuel Wallis)
- HMS Achilles 60 (Samuel Barrington)
- HMS Hero 74 (William Fortescue)
- HMS Buckingham 70 (Peter Parker)
- HMS Burford 70 (James Gambier)
- HMS Chichester 70 (William Saltern Willett)
- HMS Monmouth 64 (John Storr)
- HMS Lynn 44 (Walter Stirling)
- HMS Launceston 44 (Edmund Affleck)
- HMS Southampton 36 (Charles Antrobus)
- HMS Melampe 36 (William Hotham)
- HMS Adventure 32 (Matthew Moore)
- HMS Actaeon 28 (Paul Henry Ourry)
- HMS Flamborough 24 (Samuel Thompson)
- HMS Aldborough 24 (Mitchell Graham)
- HMS Escort 14 (Charles Ellys)
- HMS Fly 10 (George Gayton)
- HMS Druid 8 (John Luttrell)
- HMS Firedrake 8 (James Orrok)
- HMS Infernal 8 (James Mackenzie)
- HMS Furnace 8 (James Chaplen)
- HMS Vesuvius 16 (James Chads)
- HMS Aetna 16 (Michael Henry Pascal)

== Bibliography ==
- Anderson, Fred. Crucible of War: The Seven Years War and the Fate of Empire in British North America, 1754-1766. Faber and Faber, 2000.
- Brown, Peter Douglas. William Pitt, Earl of Chatham: The Great Commoner. George Allen & Unwin, 1978.
- Corbett, Julian Stafford. England in the Seven Years War: A study in combined operations. Volume II.
- Dull, Jonathan R. The French Navy and the Seven Years' War. University of Nebraska, 2005.
- Griffiths, Naomi E.S. (1992). Contexts of Acadian History, 1686-1784. McGill-Queen's University Press. ISBN 978-0-7735-6320-9.
- Middleton, Richard. The Bells of Victory: The Pitt-Newcastle Ministry and the Conduct of the Seven Years' War, 1757-1762. Cambridge University Press, 1985.
- Nelson, Paul David. General Sir Guy Carleton, Lord Dorchester: Soldier-Statesman of Early British Canada. Associated University Presses, 2000.
- Taylor, Michael. L'Invasion et L'Occupation de Belle Isle par les Anglais 1761-1763, publ. Société Historique de Belle-Île-en-Mer, print. Imprimeries de l'Atlantique, 29900 Concarneau, Finistère, France. ISBN 978-2-9550685-1-9. 2016.
