= William Saltern Willett =

Captain William Saltern Willett
- Died: 1769
- Military career
- Branch: Royal Navy
- Service years: 1741–1769
- Rank: Commodore
- Commands: HMS Kingfisher; HMS Queenborough; HMS Garland; HMS Augusta; HMS Chichester; HMS Warspite; HMS Ramillies; Commander-in-Chief, The Nore
- Conflicts: Seven Years' War

Commodore William Saltern Willett (died 1769) was a Royal Navy officer who served as Commander-in-Chief, The Nore from 1766 to 1769.

== Naval career ==
Willett became commanding officer of the sloop HMS Kingfisher in December 1745. Promoted to captain in October 1747, he commanded, successively, the sixth-rate HMS Queenborough, the sixth-rate HMS Garland, the fourth-rate HMS Augusta and the third-rate HMS Chichester. In command of the Chichester, he captured the French privateer snow Actiffe, of Dunkirk. Actiffe, of about 140 tons (bm), was pierced for 12 guns but had nine mounted, plus eight swivel guns. She was to be sold by the candle at Lloyd's Coffee House on 11 April 1758.

Willett also saw action during the Raid on St Malo in June 1758, the Battle of Quiberon Bay in November 1759 and the capture of Belle Île in 1761. He went on to command the third-rate HMS Warspite and then the third-rate HMS Ramillies and served as Commander-in-Chief, The Nore from 1766 to 1769.
