= HMS Garland (1748) =

Frigate of the British Royal Navy

History

Great Britain
- Name: HMS Garland
- Ordered: 30 November 1744
- Builder: John Poole, Sheerness Dockyard
- Laid down: 18 November 1745
- Launched: 13 August 1748
- Fate: Sold on 2 December 1783

Great Britain
- Name: Garland
- Acquired: c.1784 by purchase
- Fate: Wrecked 24 April 1792

General characteristics
- Class & type: Garland-class frigate
- Tons burthen: 500, or 50834/94, or 525 (bm)
- Length: Gundeck:113 ft 0 in (34.4 m); Keel:93 ft 4 in (28.4 m)
- Beam: 32 ft 0 in (9.8 m)
- Depth of hold: 11 ft 0 in (3.4 m)
- Complement: Frigate:160; Slaver:50–55
- Armament: Gundeck: 20 × 9-pounder guns; Fc: 2 × 9-pounder guns; QD: 2 × 3-pounder guns

HMS Garland was a frigate of the British Royal Navy, launched at Sheerness in 1748. She had an apparently uneventful career in the Royal Navy, not being listed as participating in engagements or battles. She did capture some French and American merchant vessels. Her most important capture in 1782, was that of the privateer Fair American, which had in some two years captured over 40 British vessels. The Navy sold her in 1783 and she became a slave ship, making six full voyages in the triangular trade in enslaved people. She was wrecked as she started for home having delivered the captives from her seventh voyage.

== Royal Navy ==
In her 35 years of serving the Royal Navy, Garland had some 16 captains.

- Captain William Saltern Willett (16 September 1748 – 17 October 1753): Garland served in the Mediterranean and Channel Islands.
- Captain Richard Spry (17 October 1753 – 5 June 1754)
- Captain Marriot Arbuthnot (5 June 1754 – 20 December 1757): On 13 July 1754 Garland sailed to Virginia; she returned to England September–October 1757. Garland reached Hampton Roads on 9 March 1756, with three prizes taken off Hispaniola, one of them valuable. On 28 October 1757, in company with the sloop Jamaica, Garland captured St. Estienne. St. Estienne was a French snow, from St. Domingo, carrying sugar and indigo. The capture took place 200 leagues west of the Lizard. Garland was paid off in October 1757.
- Captain Christopher Codrington (16 October 1758 – 7 December 1758)
- Captain John Ruschworth (7 December 1758 – 19 November 1759)
- Captain Thomas Shirley (19 November 1759 – 14 May 1762): Garland was engaged in cruising and convoying.
- Captain Lord Francis Reynolds (24 May 1762 – 12 February 1763): Reynolds received promotion to post captain on 12 April and then was posted to Garland for the home station and the coast of France under the command of Admiral Edward Hawe. In August 1762 Garland recaptured two vessels. Prince William, Mitchell, master, had been sailing from South Carolina to London when she was captured. Garland took her into Basque Roads, from where she sailed to Plymouth. After recapturing Polly, Baker, master, which had been sailing from Newfoundland to Teignmouth, Garland sent her into Plymouth. Then in October Garland captured St John Baptist, from Bordeaux for St Domingo, and sent her into Basque Roads. Later Garland may have sailed to Africa, returning at the conclusion of the war. Garland was then paid off.
- Captain John Reynold (11 April 1763 – 28 April 1763)
- Captain the Hon. Henry St John (28 April 1763 – 22 February 1768): Garland was based at Halifax, Nova Scotia.
- Captain Thomas Lynn (11 September 1770 – 9 October 1773): Lynn resigned his command on the grounds of ill health during his term. Captain Judd may have replaced him temporarily.
- Captain Patrick Fotheringham (9 October 1773 – 8 July 1774): Fotheringham sailed Garland to Jamaica and returned to Spithead in June 1774. She was paid off in July.
- Captain Richard Pearson (30 March 1776 – 1 March 1779): At one point Garland was stationed in the St Lawrence.
- Captain John Stanhope (5 March 1779 – 20 June 1780): Garland escorted convoys to and from Newfoundland.
- Captain Charles Chamberlayne (20 June 1780 – 27 July 1782): On 5 January 1782 Garland captured the privateer Fair American, Then on 12 March Garland captured the Pennsylvania letter of marque Admiral Zoutman, of eight guns, and the brig Surprize.
- Captain James Cotes (27 July 1782 – 1 December 1782).
- Captain Richard Callcott (15 December 1782 – 7 October 1783).

Disposal: The Navy sold Garland on 2 December 1783.

== Enslaving ==
Garland first appeared in Lloyd's Register (LR) in 1786 with J.Gibbons, master, Dawson & Co., owners, and trade Liverpool-Africa. The entry noted that she was the former man-of-war Garland. However, Garland had already started her enslaving before she appeared in LR.

In the period between 1783 and 1792, John Dawson and his partner Peter Baker, were the largest firm of slave traders in Great Britain. In 1786, Baker and Dawson, had a contract with the Spanish Government to supply slaves to Spanish America. Their vessels delivered more than 11,000 slaves. It was estimated that the captives they provided had a value of £350,000.

=== 1st voyage transporting enslaved people (1784–1785) ===
Captain James Gibbons sailed from London on 29 January 1784, bound for Angola. Garland acquired her captives primarily at Cabindo, and secondarily at Malemba. She then sailed to Cuba. She sailed from Cuba on 12 May 1785 and arrived at London on 19 June 1785. She had left Liverpool with 49 crew members and lost eight men on her voyage.

=== 2nd voyage transporting enslaved people (1785–1786) ===
Captain Gibbons sailed from Liverpool on 26 July 1785, bound for Bonny. Captain Gibbons died on 4 January 1786, and Richard Joy replaced him. Garland arrived at Caracas on 1 April 1786 and landed 450 captives. She left Caracas on 21 June and arrived back at Liverpool on 27 July. She had left with 44 crew members and lost 14 on the voyage.

=== 3rd voyage transporting enslaved people (1787) ===
Captain William Forbes sailed from Liverpool on 20 March 1787, bound for Bonny. She arrived at Havana on 1 October and landed 114 captives. She then sailed to La Guaira, where she landed 490 captives. She sailed from La Guaira on 5 November and arrived back at Liverpool on 26 December. She had left with 52 crew members and lost eight on the voyage.

=== 4th voyage transporting enslaved people (1788–1789) ===
Captain Forbes sailed from Liverpool on 15 May 1788 for Bonny. Garland landed the captives from Bonny in the Spanish Caribbean and arrived back at Liverpool on 2 April 1789. She had left with 55 crew members and lost seven on her voyage.

The Slave Trade Act 1788 (Dolben's Act) was the first British legislation passed to regulate the shipping of enslaved people. The Act limited the number of enslaved people that British slave ships could transport, based on the ships' tons burthen. At a burthen of 525 tons, the cap would have been 663 captives.

=== 5th voyage transporting enslaved people (1789–1790) ===
Captain Forbes sailed from Liverpool on 5 May 1789 for Bonny. Garland arrived at St Kitts on 1 October and landed 605 captives. She arrived back at Liverpool on 20 February 1790. She had left with 50 crew members and lost one crew member on her voyage.

=== 6th voyage transporting enslaved people (1790–1791) ===
Captain William Sherwood sailed from Liverpool on 24 July 1790, bound for Bonny. Garland arrived at Havana on 28 February 1791. She had left with 659 captives and landed 640, or a mortality rate of 2.9%. She left on 9 April and arrived back at Liverpool on 8 May. She had left with 54 crew members and lost one man on the voyage.

After the passage of Dolben's Act, masters received a bonus of £100 for a mortality rate of under 2%; the ship's surgeon received £50. For a mortality rate between two and three per cent, the bonus was halved. There was no bonus if mortality exceeded 3%. (Note: At the time the monthly wage for a captain of a slave ship out of Bristol was £5 per month.)

=== 7th voyage transporting enslaved people (1791–loss) ===
Captain Sherwood sailed from Liverpool on 9 July 1791, bound for Bonny. Garland arrived at Barbados on 5 March 1792 and landed 443 captives. She had left Liverpool with 54 crew members and lost four on the voyage.

== Fate ==
Lloyd's List reported on 24 April 1792 that Garland, Shirwood, master, had wrecked on Coblers Rock, Barbados. Her crew were saved.

In 1792, six British enslaving vessels were lost, though this is an underestimate. The source of that data does not show any Guineamen being lost on the homeward leg of their voyage. This is not surprising as absent detailed data on individual enslaving vessels, it is not always easy to distinguish a returning Guineaman from a returning West Indiaman.
