= Studholme Hodgson =

British Army officer (1708–1798)

Field Marshal Studholme Hodgson
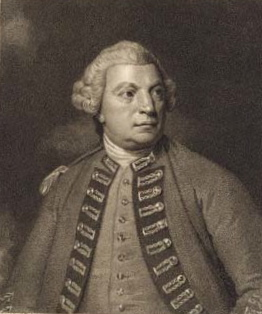
- Engraving of Hodgson by William Bond after a painting by George Romney
- Born: 1708
- Died: 20 October 1798 (aged 89 or 90); Old Burlington Street, London
- Burial place: St James's Church, Piccadilly
- Military career
- Allegiance: Great Britain
- Branch: British Army
- Service years: 1728–1798
- Rank: Field Marshal
- Conflicts: War of the Austrian Succession; Jacobite rising of 1745; French and Indian War; Seven Years' War

Field Marshal Studholme Hodgson (1708 – 20 October 1798) was a British Army officer. After serving as an Aide-de-Camp to the Duke of Cumberland at the Battle of Fontenoy during the War of the Austrian Succession and at the Battle of Culloden during the Jacobite Rebellion, he became correspondent to William Barrington, the Secretary at War, during the French and Indian War. He went on to command the British expedition which captured Belle Île in June 1761 during the Seven Years' War so enabling the British Government to use the island as a bargaining piece during the negotiations leading up to the Treaty of Paris in 1763.

== Military career ==
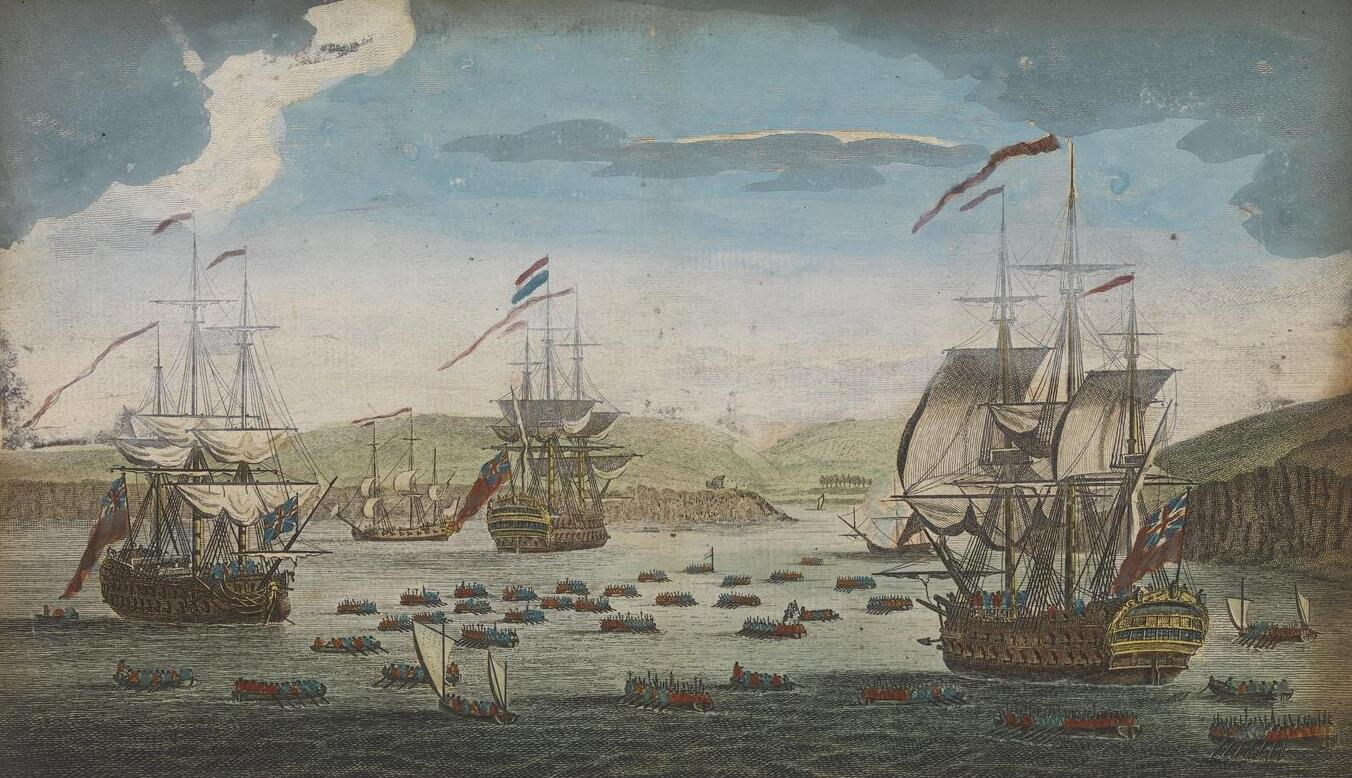
The capture of Belle Île in 1761, which Hodgson led

Born the son of John Hodgson, a merchant from Carlisle, and educated at Carlisle Grammar School, Hodgson was commissioned as an ensign in the 1st Regiment of Foot Guards and lieutenant in the Army on 2 January 1728. He was promoted to captain in his regiment and lieutenant in the Army on 3 February 1741.

Hodgson was appointed Aide-de-Camp to the Duke of Cumberland in early 1745 and fought under Cumberland at the Battle of Fontenoy in May 1745 during the War of the Austrian Succession. He also fought under Cumberland at the Battle of Culloden in April 1746 during the Jacobite Rebellion. Promoted to captain in his regiment and lieutenant colonel in the Army on 18 May 1747, he became correspondent to William Barrington, the Secretary at War, in 1755 during the French and Indian War. Hodgson raised a new regiment (later the 50th Regiment of Foot) in 1756 and served under Sir John Mordaunt, as a brigade commander, during the unsuccessful Raid on Rochefort in September 1757 during the Seven Years' War. Promoted to major-general on 15 September 1759, he became colonel of the 5th Regiment of Foot in October 1759.

Hodgson led a British raid on Belle Île, off the coast of France. After the initial British attack was repulsed a second attempt forced a beachhead. A second landing was made and, after a six-week siege, the island's main citadel at Le Palais was stormed, consolidating British control of the island in June 1761. He was much congratulated by both the King and William Pitt, Secretary of State for the Southern Department, as this "important and critical operation" enabled the British Government to use Belle Île as a bargaining piece during the negotiations leading up to the Treaty of Paris in 1763. Promoted to lieutenant general on 23 March 1765, he became Governor of Fort George and Fort Augustus in September 1765.

Hodgson became colonel of the 4th Regiment of Foot in November 1768 and, having been promoted to full general on 2 April 1778, he became colonel of the 7th Dragoon Guards in June 1782 and colonel of the 11th Light Dragoons in March 1789. Hodgson was promoted to field marshal on 30 July 1796. He died at his home in Old Burlington Street in London on 20 October 1798 and was buried at St James's Church, Piccadilly on 26 October 1798.

== Family ==
In July 1756 Hodgson married Catherine Howard, sister of Field Marshal Sir George Howard; they had three sons and two daughters, including John Hodgson (b. 16 March 1759).

== Sources ==
- Cannon, Richard (1837). Historical Records of the British Army.
- Heathcote, Tony (1999). The British Field Marshals, 1736–1997: A Biographical Dictionary. Barnsley: Leo Cooper. ISBN 0-85052-696-5.

Military offices
Preceded by James Abercromby	Colonel of the 50th Regiment of Foot; 1756–1759	Succeeded by John Griffin Griffin
Preceded by Lord George Bentinck	Colonel of the 5th Regiment of Foot; 1759–1768	Succeeded by Earl Percy
Preceded by Sir Charles Howard	Governor of Inverness; 1765–1798	Succeeded by Sir Ralph Abercromby
Preceded by Hon. Robert Brudenell	Colonel of the 4th (The King's Own) Regiment of Foot; 1768–1782	Succeeded by Sir John Burgoyne
Preceded by Philip Honywood	Colonel of the 7th (The Princess Royal's) Dragoon Guards; 1782–1789	Succeeded by Sir Charles Grey
Preceded by The Lord Dover	Colonel of the 11th Regiment of (Light) Dragoons; 1789–1798	Succeeded by The Marquess of Lothian
