= HMS Chichester (1753) =

Ship of the line of the Royal Navy

History

Great Britain
- Name: HMS Chichester
- Ordered: 12 July 1750
- Builder: Portsmouth Dockyard
- Launched: 4 June 1753
- Honours and awards: Naval General Service Medal with clasp "Egypt"
- Fate: Broken up, 1803

General characteristics
- Class & type: 1750 amendments 70-gun third rate ship of the line
- Tons burthen: 1401 (bm)
- Length: 160 ft (48.8 m) (gundeck)
- Beam: 44 ft 9 in (13.6 m)
- Depth of hold: 19 ft 6 in (5.9 m)
- Propulsion: Sails
- Sail plan: Full-rigged ship
- Armament: Gundeck: 26 × 32-pounder guns; Upper gundeck: 28 × 18-pounder guns; QD: 12 × 9-pounder guns; Fc: 4 × 9-pounder guns

HMS Chichester was a 70-gun third rate ship of the line of the Royal Navy, designed by Sir Joseph Allin and built by Peirson Lock at Portsmouth Dockyard to the standard draught for 70-gun ships as specified in the 1745 Establishment amended in 1750, and launched on 4 June 1753.

In late 1757 or early 1758 Chichester, Captain William Saltern Willett, captured the French privateer snow Actiffe, of Dunkirk. Actiffe, of about 140 tons (bm), was pierced for 12 guns but had nine mounted, plus eight swivel guns. She was to be sold by the candle at Lloyd's Coffee House on 11 April 1758.

Because Chichester served in the navy's Egyptian campaign between 8 March 1801 and 2 September, her officers and crew qualified for the clasp "Egypt" to the Naval General Service Medal that the Admiralty authorized in 1850 to all surviving claimants. (Note: A first-class share of the prize money awarded in April 1823 was worth £34 2s 4d; a fifth-class share, that of a seaman, was worth 3s 11½d. The amount was small as the total had to be shared between 79 vessels and the entire army contingent.)

Chichester served until 1803, when she was broken up.
