= Thomas Oswald (British Army officer) =

Thomas Oswald (born 1722), younger brother of James Oswald (younger) of Dunnikier, was a British Army officer in the 18th century, engaged in the War of the Austrian Succession and Seven Years' War. He joined the Scots Brigade in Dutch service in 1747 and served with them as an officer until 1756 when he joined the 60th Regiment of Foot for service in North America. Oswald commanded his regiment's 2nd battalion at the Battle of the Plains of Abraham which led to the capture of Quebec.

== Family ==
He was born in Kirkcaldy, Fife, in 1722, the son of James Oswald of Dunnikier and Anne née Durie. His elder brother James, who inherited his father's estate of Dunnikier, was MP for Dysart Burghs and Fife between 1741 and 1768 and a Lord Commissioner of the Treasury.

Another brother, John, was Bishop of Raphoe.

His grandfathers were James Oswald (elder) of Dunnikier, MP for Dysart Burghs (1710–1715), and John Durie, who was Provost of Kirkcaldy in 1704.

== Military service ==
On 2 June 1747, Thomas Oswald was enrolled as a captain in the regiment of Henry Douglas, Earl of Drumlanrig (eldest son and heir of the Duke of Queensberry), a regiment of foot raised in Scotland for the service of the Dutch States General as part of the Scots Brigade. The Scots Brigade was technically part of the British forces and its members swore allegiance to the British Crown, although fighting for the Dutch. As such Thomas Oswald entered the British Army on this date. He had war service in Flanders 1747–48, during the War of Austrian Succession. He was still serving in the Brigade in 1750 in the period following the war, after the reduction of the Brigade to one battalion. He was discharged as a pensioned captain of the Scots Brigade on April 4, 1756. After discharge from the Scots Brigade he saw war service in North America during 1756–1760 in the 60th Regiment of Foot.

=== Company Commander in the 62nd Royal American Regiment ===
On 26 December 1755, he was appointed Captain in the 62nd, Royal American, Regiment of Foot, which had four battalions in North America. The regiment was renumbered the 60th (Royal American) Regiment in February 1757. He commanded a company under Major General the Earl of Loudoun, commander-in-chief in North America. The commanders decided on Pennsylvania as the training headquarters of the new regiment, with staff headquarters in Philadelphia, primarily because a large portion of the men were to be recruited from the frontier regions of this colony. Captain Oswald was based in Reading, Pennsylvania, which commanded a line of forts defending the English colonies in America during the French and Indian War. He commanded a company under Colonel Conrad Weiser defending the frontier and taking part in the interrogation of French prisoners in late 1757.

=== Commander of the 2nd Battalion of the Royal American Regiment ===
In July 1758 he assumed the command of 2nd Battalion of the Royal Americans when, after the Siege of Louisbourg, the scene of operations moved to Quebec. This battalion was named after Lt.-General Robert Monckton, second in command at Quebec, who had seen much service as Lieutenant Colonel and Colonel of the Royal Americans. He took part in the St. John River Campaign to clear French forces and settlers from that part of Acadia.

==== Battle of the Plains of Abraham ====
The Battle of the Plains of Abraham

He commanded the 2nd Battalion of the Royal Americans on Wolfe's expedition to Quebec. At the Battle of the Plains of Abraham on 13 Sept 1759, having marched up the shore of the St. Lawrence opposite Quebec, he crossed over with his battalion, who were the last to join the British lines before battle. The rear of the left flank, facing French irregulars on that side, was covered by two battalions commanded by Brigadier-General George Townshend. These were the 15th, commanded by Major Irwing and the 2nd commanded by Captain Oswald. (See map).

In the course of the battle, Brigadier-General Murray, being informed that all the other generals were wounded and that the enemy, having previously disappeared, was now returning to the field of battle, and on hearing the continued firing of the French irregulars, sent units to beat them off. This engagement was joined at length joined by Oswald's battalion, who drove the French irregulars into the Quebec suburb of Saint-Roch and thence towards the bridge of St. Charles. The British became sole masters of the field of battle, but General Wolfe was mortally wounded. Within days, on 18 September, Jean-Baptiste Nicolas Roch de Ramezay, for the French, and Admiral Sir Charles Saunders (Royal Navy officer), and General Townshend signed the Articles of Capitulation of Quebec and the city was turned over to British control.

Thomas Oswald was appointed a Major in the Royal Americans on 29 October 1759, in command of the 2nd battalion.

Next year, Major Oswald took part in General Murray's expedition from Quebec to take Montreal and the rest of French Canada. He commanded the 4th Battalion of the expedition which was composed of the 2nd Battalion of the Royal Americans. Still Major of the 2nd Battalion in July 1761, he had to report to Amherst, Colonel of his regiment, that his soldiers had to pay for military provisions out of their own pocket.

=== Lieutenant-Colonel of the 103rd Regiment of Foot ===
Major Thomas Oswald was appointed Lieutenant-Colonel of the 103rd Regiment of Foot (Volunteer Hunters) on 10 August 1761 and left America. In June 1761, two new regiments had been either raised or formed out of existing independent companies, and thirteen more had been added in August and October. He was congratulated by his late commander General Murray, now Governor of Quebec, in a letter to his brother James Oswald on 9 November 1761. He had been given command of the 103rd, a regiment of the Light Infantry type, formed at Bury St. Edmunds, probably because he had had much experience of light troops with his battalion of the Royal Americans in North America. After the Capture of Belle Île, he was appointed Deputy Governor of the island, as Commandant of the 103rd Regiment of Foot, who had taken part, alongside the Royal Marines, in its capture. The regiment was disbanded in England in 1763 and by 1766 he was included in the list of officers on Half Pay as Lieutenant Colonel.

In 1774, he was brought back from half pay (i.e. reserve) to command the 2nd (Queen's Royal) Regiment of Foot 4 August 1774, still with the rank of Lieutenant Colonel (Robert Raitt deputising). The regiment was based in Gibraltar, but returned to England landing at Portsmouth on 26 December 1775, after an absence of half a century and Lt.Col. Oswald issued orders to mark the occasion, as well as sending out recruiting parties to enlist more men for the regiment.
