= Major Pierson (1781 ship) =

History

Great Britain
- Name: Major Pierson
- Namesake: Major Francis Peirson, the hero of the Battle of Jersey (6 January 1781)
- Owner: Thomas Lempriere, of Jersey and London
- Builder: America
- Launched: 1774
- Acquired: 1781

Pennsylvania
- Name: Admiral Zoutman
- Namesake: Admiral Johan Zoutman, commander of the Dutch forces at the battle of Dogger Bank (1781)
- Owner: Benjamin Davis, Jr., & John Patton, of Philadelphia
- Acquired: 14 January 1782 by purchase of a prize
- Captured: 12 March 1782

General characteristics
- Tons burthen: 200 (bm)
- Complement: Major Pearson:13; Admiral Zoutman: 32
- Armament: Major Pierson: 10 × 4-pounder guns; Admiral Zootman: 8 guns

Major Pierson was launched in American in 1774 under another name and first appeared in Lloyd's Register (LR) in the supplemental pages for 1781. An American privateer captured her in 1781 and she became the Pennsylvania letter of marque Admiral Zoutman. The British Royal Navy recaptured her in 1782.

Year	Master	Owner	Trade	Source
1781	J.Whittal	T. Lempriere	London–New York	LR
1782	J.Whittal	Lempriere	London–New York	LR

Lloyd's List (LL) reported on 18 December 1781 that Major Pearson, Withall, master, while on a voyage from London to New York, had parted from her convoy in the Western Isles in a gale. She was taken and her captor sent her into Egg Harbour. The next issue of Lloyd's List lists Major Pearson, Withal, master, as one of several vessels that willfully had left their convoy escorts HMS Centurion and Camel on 26 and 27 August off Terceira Island. Her entry in Lloyd's Register for 1782 bears the annotation "taken".

Major Pierson was offered for public sale on 25 October 1781 at Little Egg Harbor with her sails and rigging, and her cargo of flour, barley, and hops.

Major Pearson became the Pennsylvania letter of marque Admiral Zoutman, commissioned on 14 January 1782 under the command of Captain William McFadden.

The frigate HMS Garland captured Admiral Zoutman on 12 March 1782. When captured Admiral Zoutman was carrying 1500 barrels of flour. Garland sent her into New York.

When Admiral Zoutman arrived at New York, the British transferred her crew to the prison hulk Jersey. First Mate Cochran managed to escape on 1 July 1782. On 16 July, he was at Philadelphia where he dictated a formal affidavit of conditions aboard Jersey.
