= 103rd Regiment of Foot (Volunteer Hunters) =

- Active: 1760–1763
- Country: Great Britain
- Branch: British Army
- Type: Infantry
- Role: Line infantry
- Size: One battalion
- Engagements: Seven Years' War

The 103rd Regiment of Foot (Volunteer Hunters) was a line infantry regiment of British Army raised at Bury St Edmunds in October 1760. Thomas Oswald was colonel of the regiment from 1761 to 1763. The regiment took part, alongside His Majesty's Marine Forces, in the capture of Belle Île in April 1761 during the Seven Years' War. It was then disbanded in England in 1763 upon the conclusion of the war.
