= HMS Infernal (1757) =

Sloop of the Royal Navy

History

Great Britain
- Name: HMS Infernal
- Ordered: 5 October 1756
- Builder: Henry Bird, Northam, Southampton
- Laid down: November 1756
- Launched: 4 July 1757
- Completed: 11 July 1757
- Commissioned: April 1757
- Decommissioned: March 1763
- Out of service: 26 October 1774
- Fate: Sold out of service, Deptford Dockyard

General characteristics
- Class & type: 8-gun Infernal class bomb vessel, 1758–59; 16-gun sloop, 1757, 1760–63
- Tons burthen: 307 39/94 (bm)
- Length: 91 ft 9 in (28.0 m) (overall); 75 ft 0 in (22.9 m) (gundeck)
- Beam: 27 ft 9 in (8.5 m)
- Depth of hold: 12 ft 1 in (3.7 m)
- Propulsion: Sail
- Sail plan: Ketch-rigged sloop
- Complement: 60 (bomb vessel), 110 (sloop)
- Armament: Bomb vessel: 8 × 6-pdrs, 12 × 1/2-pdr swivels, 1 × 13-inch mortar, 1 × 10-inch mortar; Sloop-of-war: 14 × 6-pdrs, 12 × 1/2-pdr swivels

HMS Infernal was an 8-gun bomb vessel of the Royal Navy, constructed in 1757 and in service until 1763. Designed by Thomas Slade, she was the prototype for six subsequent Infernal class bomb vessels which saw service in the Mediterranean and the West Indies during the Seven Years' War with France. In 1760 she was refitted as a sloop and returned to active service in the Caribbean.

Infernal was paid off at the conclusion of the War in 1763, and sold out of Navy service in 1774.

== Construction ==
Infernal was the first of seven bomb vessels designed by Surveyor of the Navy Thomas Slade to strengthen the Navy's shore bombardment capacity during the Seven Years' War. Admiralty Orders for her construction were issued on 5 October 1756, followed by a contract to master shipwright Henry Bird to build the vessel at the civilian dockyard in Northam, Southampton. The contract specified that Infernal should be ready for launch within six months in return for payment of £11.5.0 per ton burthen. While this time requirement was not met, Admiralty retained sufficient confidence in Bird's capacity that he was engaged to build a second vessel, HMS Blast, in 1759.

Infernal's dimensions were in keeping with other vessels of her class, with an overall length of 91 ft 9 in (28.0 m), a beam of 27 ft 9 in (8.5 m) and measuring 30739/94 tons burthen. Construction costs were £3,355 with an additional £2,082 for fitting out. Slade's design included a narrow stern, bluff bow and broad beam, creating a short, heavy vessel capable of supporting the recoil of the mortars. A consequence of this design was that her sailing qualities were very poor, as she lacked both speed and the ability to sail to close to the wind.

Infernal was among the last bomb vessels to be built to a two-masted ketch rig design. Over the preceding decade the Navy Board had considered ways to improve the handling and seaworthiness of its bomb vessels, including using a three-masted ship rig instead of the ketch. To test this concept, the Board resolved that four Infernal-class bombs, including Infernal herself, would be ketch-rigged and the other three ship-rigged, and that their relative performance would determine future bomb vessel design.

She was initially equipped with eight six-pounder cannons for ship defence, and twelve 1/2-pounder swivel guns to ward off boarding parties. Slade's design specified that two mortars be installed, one capable of 10-inch shot and the other of 13-inch, for use against fortifications. The mortars were also capable of being loaded with around one hundred one-pound projectiles at a time, for use against enemy personnel.

Bomb vessel construction ended on 11 July 1757, but by Admiralty Order the newly launched ship was immediately returned to Northam dockyard for refitting as a sloop. The mortars were removed and replaced with an additional six six-pounder cannons, and additional quarters constructed for an enlarged crew totaling 110 men.

== Naval service ==
Infernal was commissioned into the Navy in July 1757, as a 14-gun sloop under Commander James Mackenzie. She was immediately attached to Admiral Edward Hawke's fleet for the capture of Île-d'Aix on 23 September, and the subsequent Raid on Rochefort. In April 1758 she was sailed to Portsmouth and restored to her original function as a bomb vessel at a cost of £884. Six of her cannons were removed and the original 10-inch and 13-inch mortars and were restored. Her crew was reduced to 60 men, though James Mackenzie retained his command. A unit of Army gunners was brought aboard to oversee the use of the mortars.

In May 1758 she bombarded the French ports of St Malo and Cherbourg returning to Portsmouth in June. Disease had broken out on board, and a substantial part of the crew were offloaded to the Haslar Hospital, suffering from what surgeon James Lind described as "fevers of the most malignant kind." Replacements having been found, Infernal returned to sea and was present at the Battle of Saint Cast in September. On 12 November she was assigned to service off the Leeward Islands as part of British plans to seize the French naval base at Martinique. In 1759 she engaged in bombardments of both Martinique and Guadeloupe, but her usefulness as a bomb vessel was hampered by Britain's defensive position in the Caribbean. By Admiralty Order, on 20 March 1760 she was again fitted out as a sloop and assigned to cruising the Caribbean in search of French merchant vessels. In August she encountered a French privateer from Cherbourg, accompanied by Resolution, a captured British merchant ship. The privateer escaped without giving battle, but Infernal succeeded in retaking Resolution and returning her to London. Infernal was later present during the British landings at Belleisle between April and June 1761, and raids on Martinique in January and February 1762.

James Mackenzie died in April 1762 and was replaced by Commander Charles Roche, with Infernal continuing her Caribbean patrols. In company with six other ships she took part in the capture of a single French ship, Post de Nantz, for which prize money was paid the following year.

In February 1763 the Treaty of Paris brought an end to the war, and Infernal was returned to Deptford where she was paid off and her crew assigned to other vessels. A marine survey was conducted on 19 May 1763, and another on 31 January 1770, but there were no orders for repairs. Navy Board expenditure indicates she was almost entirely neglected during this time, with a total of £22 being spent in her upkeep between 1763 and 1774. On 26 October 1774, after eleven years at the dockyard, the increasingly decrepit vessel was sold into private hands for £350. Her fate thereafter is unknown.

== Bibliography ==
- Lind, James (1965). "Treatise of the Scurvy". In Lloyd, Christopher (ed.). The Health of Seamen:Selections from the Works of Dr. James Lind, Sir Gilbert Blance and Dr. Thomas Trotter. London: Navy Records Society. OCLC 1850893.
- McLaughlan, Ian (2014). The Sloop of War, 1650–1763. Seaforth Publishing. ISBN 9781848321878.
- Ware, Chris (1994). The Bomb Vessel: Shore Bombardment Ships of the Age of Sail. Conway Maritime Press. ISBN 0851776310.
- Winfield, Rif (2007). British Warships of the Age of Sail 1714–1792: Design, Construction, Careers and Fates. Seaforth. ISBN 9781844157006.
