= Candle auction =

Method of auction

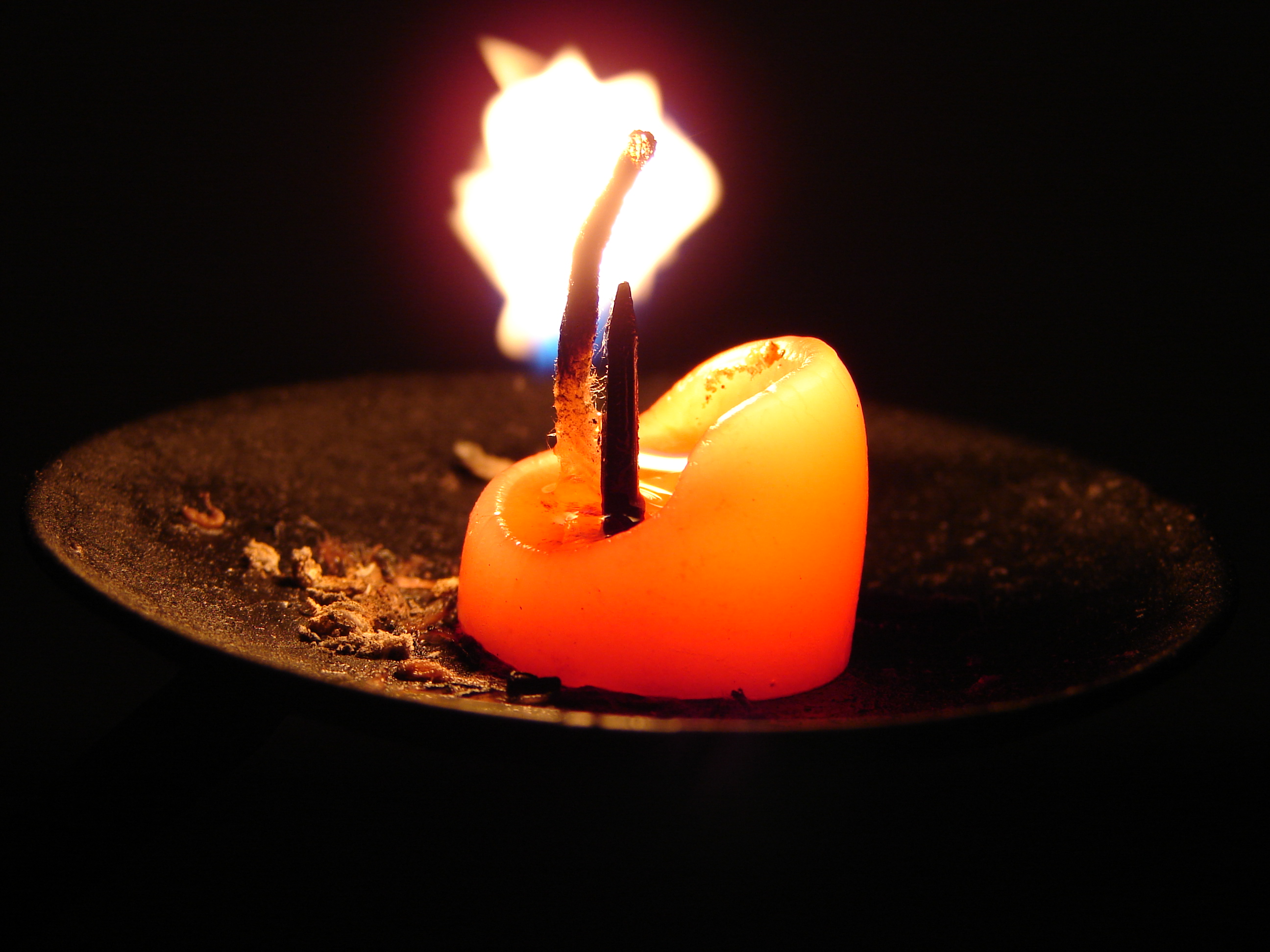
A candle auction closes when the flame of a wax candle runs out

A candle auction, or auction by the candle, is a variation on the typical English auction. It consists of bidding for as long as one or two candles are lit. Bidding ceases as soon as the candles have burned out. This is intended to ensure that no one could know exactly when the auction would end and make a last-second bid (auction sniping).

== England ==
Candle auction became popular in the 17th and 18th centuries. Sometimes, other unpredictable processes, such as a footrace, were used in place of the expiration of a candle.

Auction by the candle was known in England by 1641, when it is mentioned in the records of the House of Lords. The practice rapidly became popular, and in 1652, John Milton wrote, "The Council thinks it meet to propose the way of selling by inch of candle, as being the most probable means to procure the true value of the goods." Samuel Pepys's diary of his London life records two occasions when the Admiralty (his employer) sold surplus ships "by an inch of candle" (November 1660 and September 1662). Pepys also relates a hint from a highly successful bidder, who had observed that, just before expiring, a candle-wick always flares up slightly: on seeing this, he would shout his final – and winning – bid.

Although the candle auction went out of favour in the 17th century, it was still not uncommon in the sale of ships at Lloyd's Coffee House in London in the early 19th century. For instance, Sarah Christiana, among other ships, was offered for sale in a candle auction in 1828.

A few candle auctions are still held today as a form of tradition. In Chedzoy, Somerset, a plot of church land is sold by candle auction once every 21 years. In Tatworth, a 6-acre (24,000 m^{2}) plot is auctioned by candle once per year. In Leigh, Dorset, two pieces of land, Alton Mead and Bere (or Beer) Mead, are auctioned annually, and in Bourne, Lincolnshire, the 1-acre (4,000 m^{2}) White Bread Meadow is auctioned by means of a race between two boys from the town.

== France ==
Candle auctions are still used, and not infrequently, for some real estate auctions in France. They are handled by notaries (civil law notaries). One (big) candle burns throughout the whole session. In the event of a bidding silence, the notary lights two small candles, each lasting about 30 seconds. If no one places a new bid while the 2 candles are burning, the last bid wins. In the event of a new bid between the burning of the two fires, the auction starts again until the next silence, to restart the protocol.

== Other ==
A modern variant of the candle auction is used in some online auction systems to prevent auction sniping. In these auctions, a computer randomly selects the time when the auction will end to discourage snipers from attempting to enter bids at the last second. Both theoretically and experimentally, bidders submit serious bids from the start in candle auctions.
