= Lye =

Sodium hydroxide and potassium hydroxide

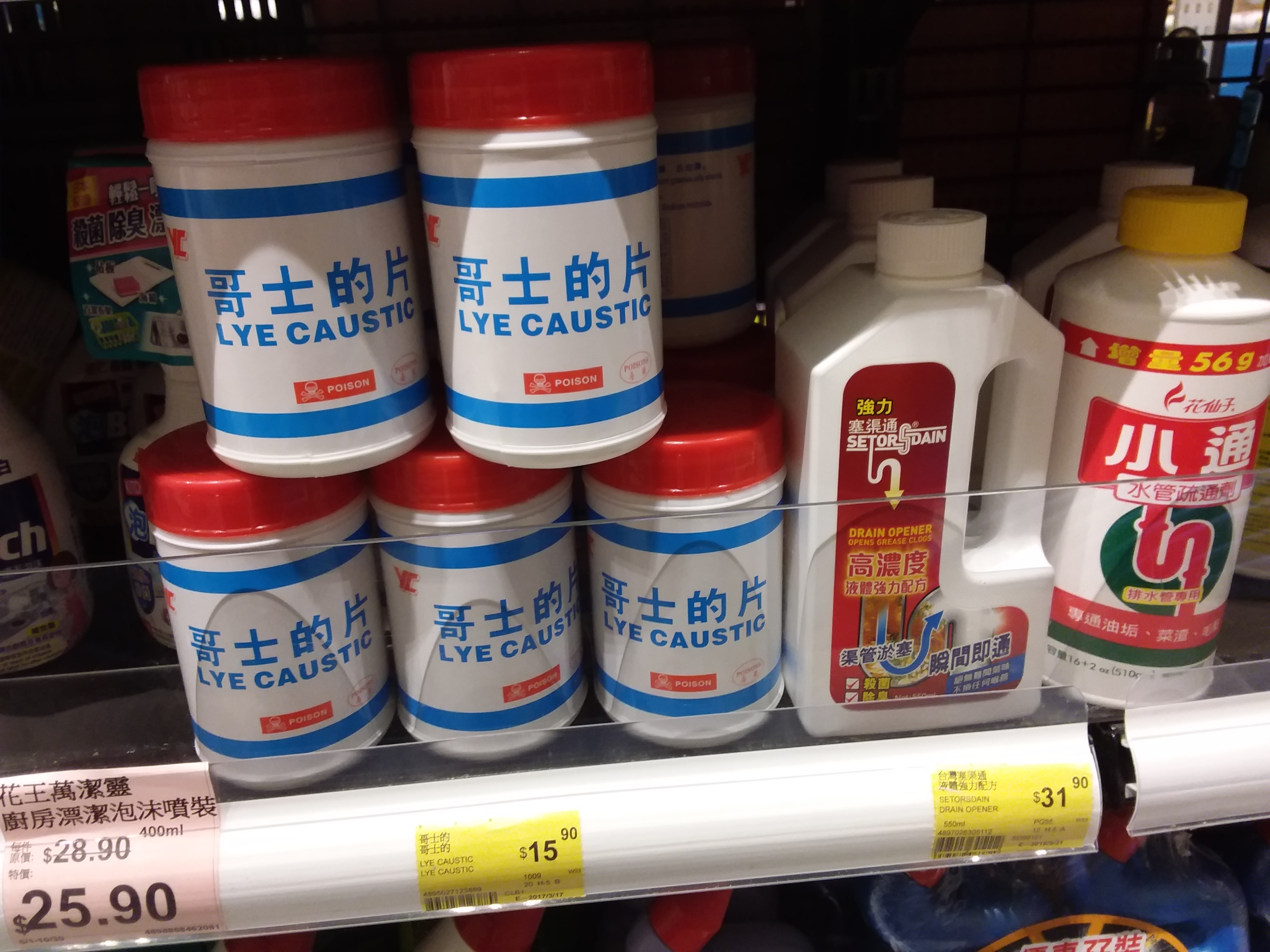
Lye for sale in a shop in Hong Kong

Lye is the common name of various alkaline solutions, including soda lye (a solution of sodium hydroxide) and potash lye (a solution of potassium hydroxide). Lyes are used as cleaning products, as ingredients in soapmaking, and in various other contexts.

== History ==
The word lye derives from the root *lau, meaning to wash (compare lave, lather) and has cognates in all the Germanic languages.

Traditionally, lye was made by leaching of wood ashes in water, creating an alkaline liquor rich in potassium carbonate. The alkalinity could be increased by the addition of slaked lime, which would cause the solute to become potassium hydroxide or caustic potash.

Indigenous peoples of the Americas used lye in food processing and in the consumption of certain plant products. In particular, lye was employed in nixtamalization, the treatment of maize with an alkaline solution that improves processing characteristics and increases nutrient bioavailability. Depending on local resources, lye was produced from wood ashes, which yield potash-rich alkaline solutions, or from lime produced by calcining limestone or marine shells and subsequently slaking the resulting quicklime. In some regions, mixtures of ash and lime were also used for maize processing.

In the Andes, alkaline materials such as plant ashes, lime derived from burned shells or limestone, or mixtures of ash and lime (called llipta in Peru) were also consumed since prehistoric times together with coca leaves. The alkali raises oral pH and enhances the release and absorption of coca alkaloids through the oral mucosa.

== Uses ==
=== Food preparation ===
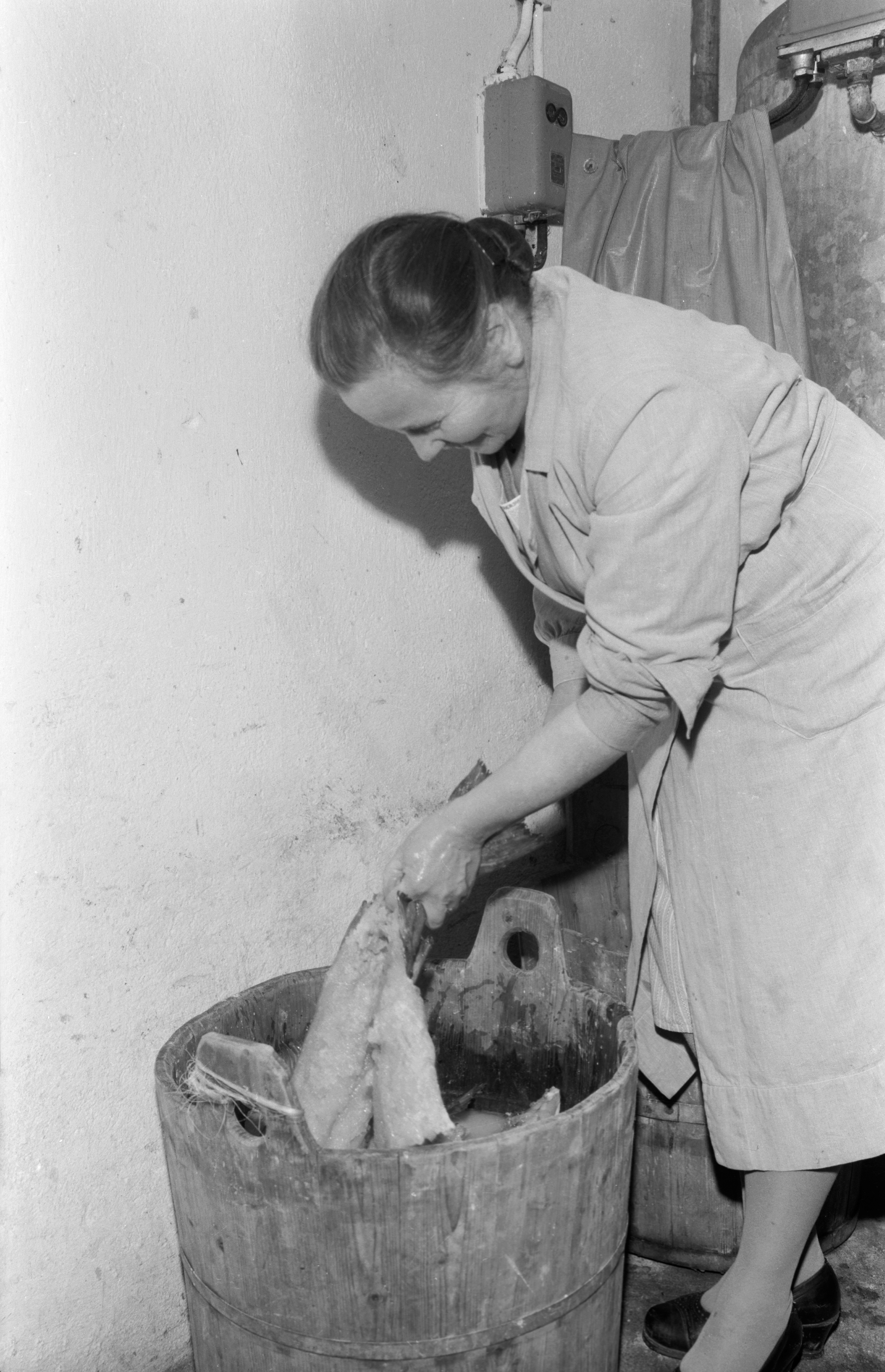
A Finnish woman preparing a lutefisk or lye-cured fish

Lyes are used to cure many types of food, including olives and cocoa (making them less bitter), canned mandarin oranges, lye rolls, century eggs, pretzels, candied pumpkins, and bagels.

Lye is the curing agent and namesake of the traditional Nordic lutefisk, a type of preserved fish. They are also used as a tenderizer in the crust of baked Cantonese moon cakes, in "zongzi" (glutinous rice dumplings wrapped in bamboo leaves), in chewy southern Chinese noodles popular in Hong Kong and southern China, and in Japanese ramen noodles. In the Philippines, lye is used in the making of kutsinta, a type of rice cake, and pitsi-pitsî. In Assam, extensive use is made of a type of lye called khar in Assamese and karwi in Boro, which is obtained from the ashes of banana stems, roots, and skins. It is used in cooking, curing, as medicine, and as a substitute for soap. Lye made out of wood ashes is also used in the nixtamalization process of hominy corn by the tribes of the Eastern Woodlands in North America. Chocolate was first dutched using lye as a way to alkalize the cacao bean.

In the United States, food-grade lye must meet the requirements outlined in the Food Chemicals Codex, as prescribed by the Food and Drug Administration. Lower grades of lye that are unsuitable for use in food preparation are commonly used as drain cleaners and oven cleaners.

=== Soap making ===
Both sodium hydroxide and potassium hydroxide are used in making soap. Potassium hydroxide soaps are softer and more easily dissolved in water than sodium hydroxide soaps. Sodium hydroxide and potassium hydroxide are not interchangeable in either the proportions required or the properties produced in making soaps.

"Hot process" soap making also uses lye as the main ingredient. Lye is added to water, cooled for a few minutes and then added to oils and butters. The mixture is then cooked over a period of time (1–2 hours), typically in a slow cooker, and then placed into a mold.

=== Cosmetics ===
Lye, like other hydroxide-based products, is also used as a hair relaxer and straightener. Lye relaxers break a third of the chemical bonds in the hair strand and cause the hair to swell. Rinsing and then heating the hair straightens the strands. Due to their high pH, they often cause scalp irritation. Though no-lye solutions, which use guanidine or lithium hydroxide, produce less scalp irritation, they may cause brittleness due to calcium deposits.

People of African descent have used lye to relax or straighten hair since the nineteenth century. Black men used lye-based formulations to conk their hair, and black entrepreneurs sold such formulations under names like Konkalene; The Autobiography of Malcolm X includes an account of Malcolm X receiving his first lye conk. The Johnson Products Company introduced industrially produced lye-based relaxers for African American salon hair care in the 1950s; Ultra Wave was marketed to men and Ultra Sheen was marketed to women, and the company represented 80% of the chemical relaxer market through the 1960s. In 1971, Johnson Products became the first black-owned company on the American Stock Exchange.

=== Industrial processes ===
A number of alkaline substances including sodium hydroxide have been used to adjust the pH during factory processes. It is regularly used to make fruit juices alkaline so that the pulp and sediment will clump, or form flocs, and can be removed. This results in a clear fruit juice that has been clarified. Due to low cost, it has been the main way that chicken scalding tanks are kept sanitary, with an added benefit that it helps the feathers come off.

=== Cleaning ===
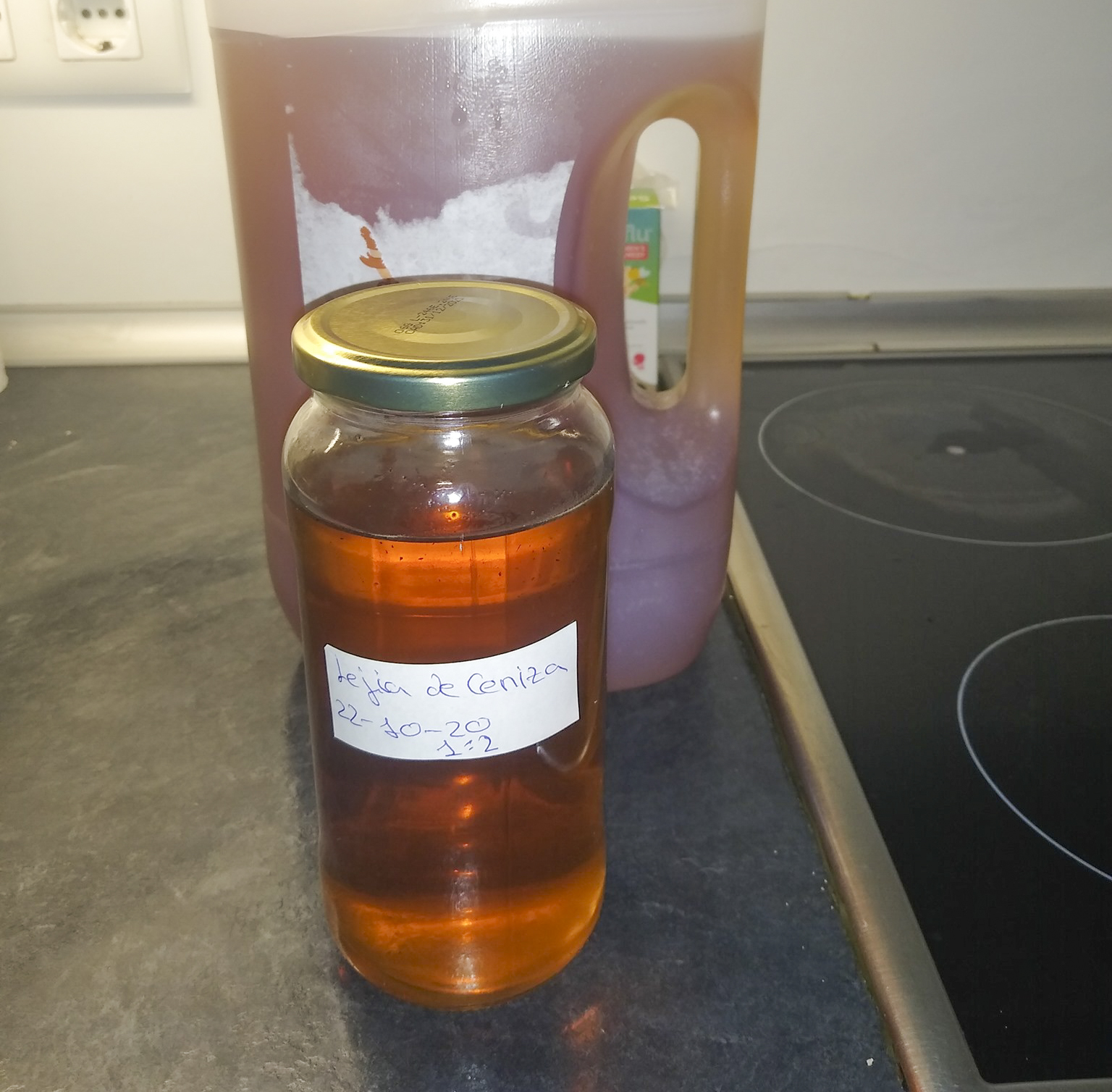
A jar of homemade wood ash lye

Lyes are also valued for their cleaning effects. Sodium hydroxide is commonly the major constituent in commercial and industrial oven cleaners and clogged drain openers, due to its grease-dissolving abilities. Lyes decompose greases via alkaline ester hydrolysis, yielding water-soluble residues that are easily removed by rinsing.

=== Tissue digestion ===
Alkaline hydrolysis (sometimes also referred to as water cremation or resomation) is a process in which a concentrated solution of sodium or potassium hydroxide is used to digest human or animal bodies or body parts. In many countries, including the United States and the Netherlands, the process is primarily used in disposing of certain types of medical waste or complete bodies in lieu of traditional burial or cremation.

The process involves placing the body or body parts into a sealed chamber, adding a mixture of lye and water and the application of heat to accelerate the process. After several hours the chamber will contain a liquid with coffee-like appearance, and the only solids that remain are very fragile bone hulls of mostly calcium phosphate, which can be mechanically crushed to a fine powder with very little force. Sodium hydroxide is frequently used in the process of decomposing roadkill dumped in landfills by animal disposal contractors. Due to its low cost and easy availability, it has also been used to dispose of corpses by criminals. Italian serial killer Leonarda Cianciulli used this chemical to turn dead bodies into soap. In Mexico, Santiago Meza López, a bricklayer who worked for drug cartels, admitted to having disposed of more than 300 bodies with it.

=== Fungus identification ===
A 3–10% solution of potassium hydroxide (KOH) gives a color change in some species of mushrooms:

- In Agaricus, some species such as A. xanthodermus turn yellow with KOH, many have no reaction, and A. subrutilescens turns green.
- Distinctive change occurs for some species of Cortinarius and boletes

== Safety ==
=== First aid ===
When a person has been exposed to lye, sources recommend immediate removal of contaminated clothing/materials, gently brushing/wiping excess off of skin, and then flushing the area of exposure with running water for 15–60 minutes as well as contacting emergency services.

=== Protection ===
Personal protective equipment including safety glasses, chemical-resistant gloves, and adequate ventilation are required for the safe handling of lye. When in proximity to lye that is dissolving in an open container of water, the use of a vapor-resistant face mask is recommended. Adding lye too quickly can cause a runaway thermal reaction which can result in the mixture boiling or erupting.

=== Storage ===
Lye in its solid state is deliquescent and has a strong affinity for moisture in the air. As a result, lye will dissolve when exposed to open air, absorbing large amounts of atmospheric moisture. Accordingly, lye is stored in air-tight (and correspondingly moisture tight) containers. Glass is not a good material to be used for storage as severe alkalis are mildly corrosive to it. Similar to the case of other corrosives, the containers should be labeled to indicate the potential danger of the contents and stored away from children, pets, heat, and moisture.

=== Hazardous reactions ===
The majority of safety concerns with lye are also common with most corrosives, such as their potentially destructive effects on living tissues; examples are the skin, flesh, and the cornea. Solutions containing lyes can cause chemical burns, permanent injuries, scarring and blindness, immediately upon contact. Lyes may be harmful or even fatal if swallowed; ingestion can cause esophageal stricture. Moreover, the solvation of dry solid lye is highly exothermic and the resulting heat may cause additional burns or ignite flammables.

The reaction between sodium hydroxide and some metals is also hazardous. Aluminium, magnesium, zinc, tin, chromium, brass and bronze all react with lye to produce hydrogen gas. Since hydrogen is flammable, mixing a large quantity of lye with aluminium could result in an explosion. Both the potassium and sodium forms are able to dissolve copper.
