= Calasiao =

Municipality in Pangasinan, Philippines

- Municipality
- Municipality of Calasiao
- Municipal Hall Calasiao-Dagupan Road at Brgy. Nalsian Saints Peter and Paul Parish Church

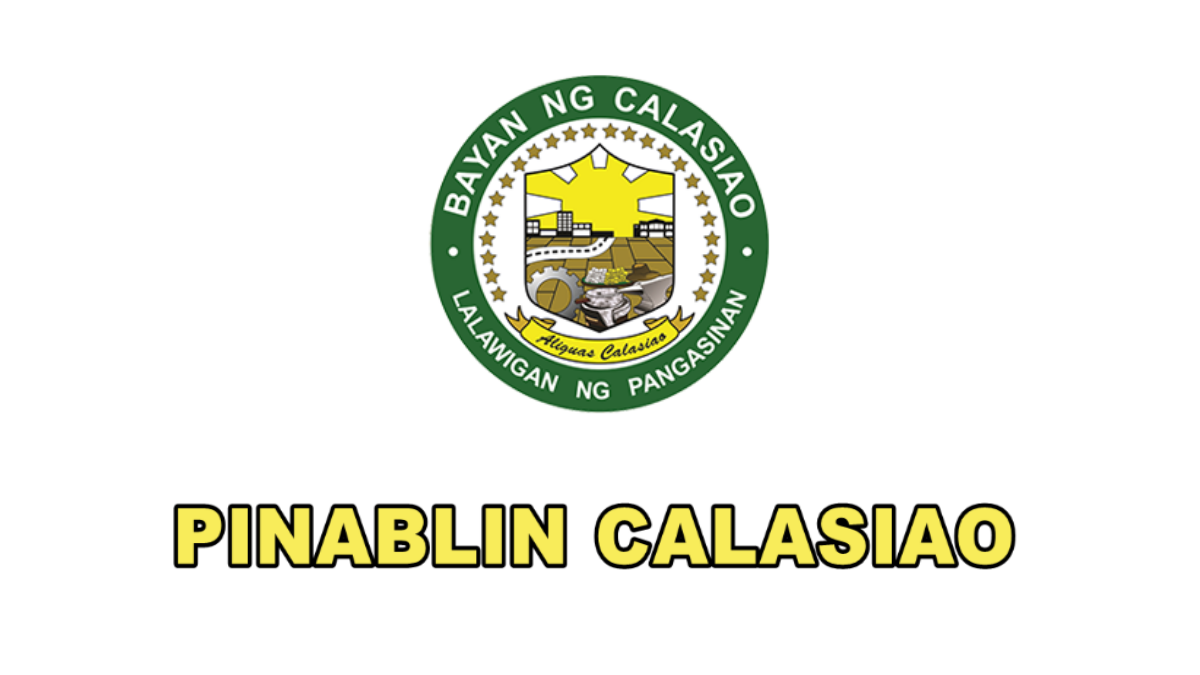
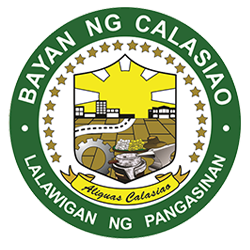
- Flag Seal

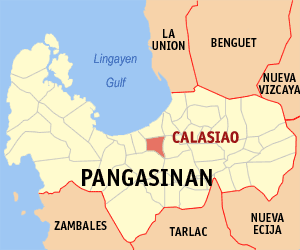
- Map of Pangasinan with Calasiao highlighted
- Interactive map of Calasiao
- Location within the Philippines
- Coordinates: 16°01′N 120°22′E
- Country: Philippines
- Region: Ilocos Region
- Province: Pangasinan
- District: 3rd district
- Founded: June 29, 1592
- Barangays: 24 (see Barangays)

Government
  - Type: Sangguniang Bayan
  - Mayor: Patrick A. Caramat (Nacionalista)
  - Vice Mayor: Kevin Roy Q. Macanlalay (Nacionalista)
  - Representative: Maria Rachel J. Arenas (Lakas)
  - Municipal Council: Members: Kyle Arthur B. Gasper; Nestor A. Gabrillo; Ardieson B. Soriano; Manny D.V. Datuin; Elias S. Villanueva; Jose A. Loresco; Myc D. Sison; Haverdani Das B. Mesina
  - Electorate: 68,134 voters (2025)

Area
  - Total: 48.36 km^{2} (18.67 sq mi)
- Elevation: 8.0 m (26.2 ft)
- Highest elevation: 38 m (125 ft)
- Lowest elevation: −2 m (−6.6 ft)

Population (2024 census)
  - Total: 100,686
  - Density: 2,082/km^{2} (5,392/sq mi)
  - Households: 24,225

Economy
  - Income class: 1st municipal income class
  - Poverty incidence: 10.24% (2023)
  - Revenue: ₱ 439.1 million (2024)
  - Assets: ₱ 971.3 million (2024)
  - Expenditure: ₱ 379.4 million (2024)
  - Liabilities: ₱ 215.2 million (2024)

Service provider
  - Electricity: Dagupan Electric Corporation (DECORP)
- Time zone: UTC+8 (PST)
- ZIP code: 2418
- PSGC: 0105517000
- IDD : area code: +63 (0)75
- Native languages: Pangasinan; Ilocano; Sambal; Tagalog
- Catholic diocese: Lingayen-Dagupan
- Patron saint: Saint Peter and Paul
- Website: www.calasiao.gov.ph

Calasiao, officially the Municipality of Calasiao (Pangasinan: Baley na Calasiao; Ilocano: Ili ti Calasiao; Tagalog: Bayan ng Calasiao), is a municipality in the province of Pangasinan, Philippines. According to the 2024 census, it has a population of 100,686 people.

Today, Calasiao is known as a first class, highly commercialized municipality and is strategically located at the heart of Pangasinan. It consists of 24 barangays and 31 sitios across a total land area of 4,836 hectares. Being a town adjacent to the city of Dagupan, the municipality's economic activities are fed by the demand in Dagupan as the town increasingly becomes an important satellite commercial hub for the immediate area. In terms of delicacy, Calasiao's flagship product is the native rice cake known as Puto Calasiao.

== Etymology ==
The name Calasiao was derived from the root word lasi, meaning "lightning". Building on this root is the Pangasinense word Kalasian, which means "a place where lightning frequently occurs". Upon the arrival of the Spaniards, they called the place "Lugar de Rayos", a literal Spanish translation of the word Kalasian. It was named as such because it is said that Calasiao back in the day was always frequented by this natural phenomenon.

== History ==
The indigenous people of Calasiao are descended from the Austronesian-speaking people who settled into the Philippines from Taiwan 5,000 years ago. Calasiao was settled by a Pangasinan speaking people whose language belongs to the Malayo-Polynesian branch of the Austronesian languages family.

In 1571, the Spanish conquest of Pangasinan began. The Spanish conquistadores were accompanied by Roman Catholic missionaries who introduced Roman Catholicism to the indigenous peoples of Pangasinan. The town of Calasiao became part of the Pangasinan encomendia of Labaya, designated as belonging to the King of Spain, Juan Ximenez del Opaline, and a son of Alonso Hernandez de Sandoval for whom tributes were collected.

In the 16th century, Dominican friars, who were settling at Gabon, were driven out because of the continuing unrest in the town. The formation of the new Calasiao however was not immediately welcomed by its native inhabitants.

Hence in 1660, when the call for the Malong Rebellion came, the citizens picked up their weapons and joined the fight against the Spanish rule. The citizens were also one of the first people to answer the call by Juan de la Cruz Palaris of Binalatongan (now San Carlos City) to rebel, which succeeded in driving the Spanish civil and ecclesiastical authorities out of the vicinity.

On October 8, 1903, Calasiao absorbed the municipality of Santa Barbara by virtue of Philippine Commission Act No. 931. However, Santa Barbara was later separated as a re-established municipality on October 31, 1906.

== Geography ==
Calasiao is situated 18.15 kilometers (11.28 mi) from the provincial capital Lingayen, and 213.71 kilometers (132.79 mi) from the country's capital city of Manila.

=== Barangays ===
Calasiao is politically subdivided into 24 barangays. Each barangay consists of puroks and some have sitios.

- Ambonao
- Ambuetel
- Banaoang
- Bued
- Buenlag†
- Cabilocaan
- Dinalaoan
- Doyong
- Gabon
- Lasip
- Longos
- Lumbang
- Macabito
- Malabago
- Mancup
- Nagsaing
- Nalsian
- Poblacion East
- Poblacion West^
- Quesban
- San Miguel
- San Vicente
- Songkoy
- Talibaew
- † Indicates the most populous barangay.
- ^ The seat of government

=== Climate ===
Climate data for Calasiao, Pangasinan
Month	Jan	Feb	Mar	Apr	May	Jun	Jul	Aug	Sep	Oct	Nov	Dec	Year
Mean daily maximum °C (°F)	31 (88)	31 (88)	33 (91)	34 (93)	34 (93)	33 (91)	32 (90)	31 (88)	31 (88)	32 (90)	31 (88)	31 (88)	32 (90)
Mean daily minimum °C (°F)	21 (70)	21 (70)	23 (73)	25 (77)	25 (77)	25 (77)	25 (77)	24 (75)	24 (75)	24 (75)	23 (73)	22 (72)	24 (74)
Average precipitation mm (inches)	4.3 (0.17)	19.1 (0.75)	27.3 (1.07)	45.2 (1.78)	153.3 (6.04)	271.3 (10.68)	411.1 (16.19)	532 (20.9)	364.4 (14.35)	182.5 (7.19)	56.3 (2.22)	24.4 (0.96)	2,091.2 (82.3)
Average rainy days	3	2	3	5	14	17	22	23	21	13	7	4	134
Source: World Weather Online (Use with caution: this is modeled/calculated data, not measured locally.)

== Demographics ==
Population census of Calasiao
Year	Pop.	±% p.a.
1903	16,539	—
1918	16,960	+0.17%
1939	19,325	+0.62%
1948	23,269	+2.09%
1960	29,330	+1.95%
1970	38,576	+2.77%
1975	43,640	+2.50%
1980	48,101	+1.96%
1990	62,966	+2.73%
1995	69,528	+1.87%
2000	77,039	+2.22%
2007	85,419	+1.43%
2010	91,109	+2.37%
2015	95,154	+0.83%
2020	100,471	+1.15%
2024	100,686	+0.05%
Source: Philippine Statistics Authority

=== Languages ===
The people in Calasiao speak Pangasinan, the dominant language in central Pangasinan. Ilocano, Tagalog, and English are also widely spoken.

== Economy ==
Poverty incidence of Calasiao (%)

Source: Philippine Statistics Authority

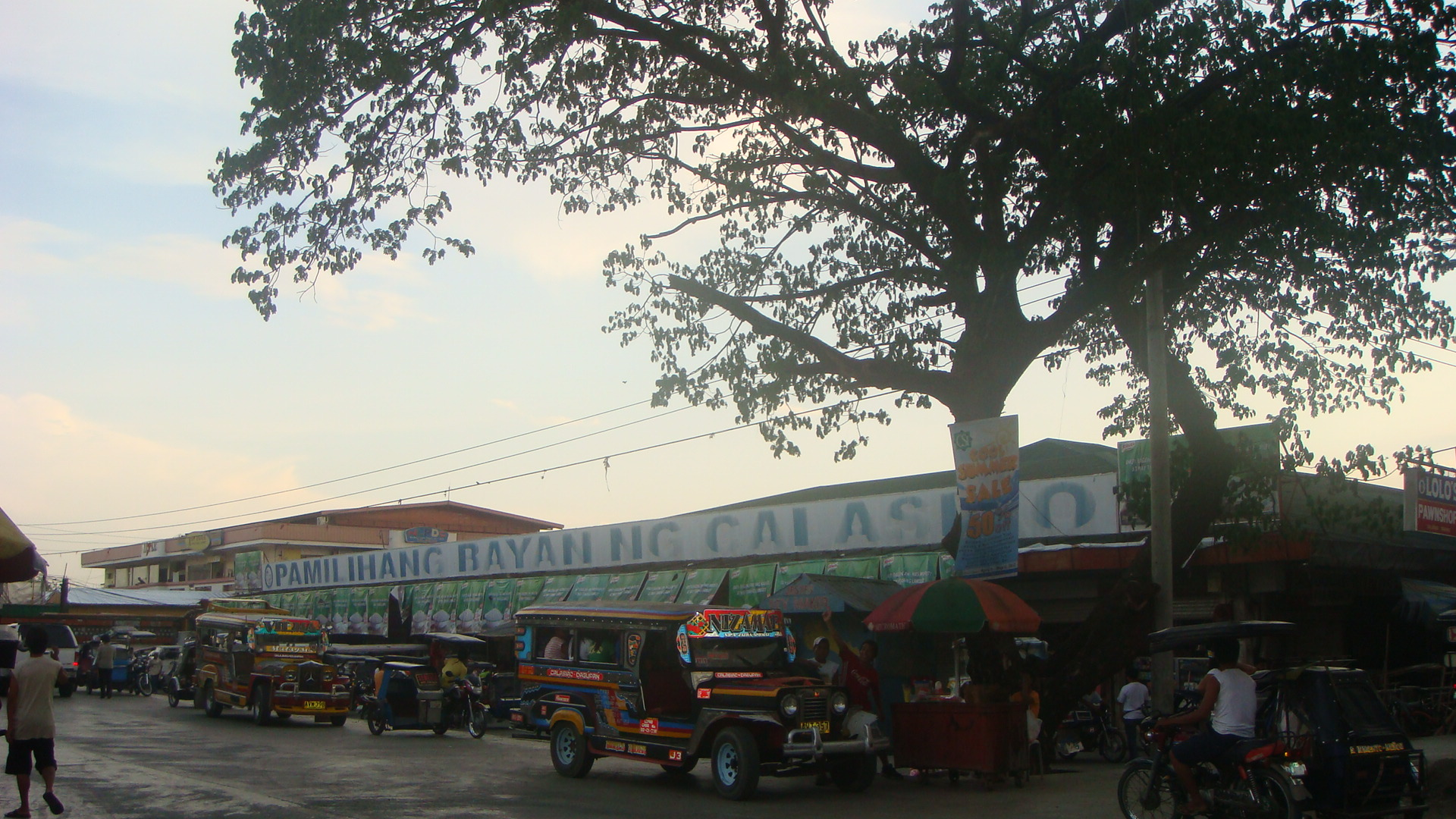
Public Market

Calasiao is centrally located in Pangasinan, between Dagupan and San Carlos City, with a major road connecting Calasiao to both cities. The town is also connected to Santa Barbara, from where the MacArthur Highway connects to Baguio City and Metro Manila.

Calasiao has rich farmlands planted mainly with palay or rice, coconuts and mangoes. Calasiao also has a lot of fishponds along its rivers and wetlands where fish like bangus (milkfish), pantat (catfish), and tilapia are raised. A Coca-Cola Bottlers plant is located in Purok 7 Barangay Bued Calasiao.

In June 2010, Robinsons Malls announced the construction of its 30th mall in this town. Robinsons Place Pangasinan is a two-level mall built on a 5.8 hectares (14 acres) lot with a gross floor area of 31,900 square metres (343,000 sq ft) and a gross leasable area of 23,000 square metres (250,000 sq ft).

== Government ==
=== Local government ===
Calasiao, belonging to the third congressional district of the province of Pangasinan, is governed by a mayor designated as its local chief executive and by a municipal council as its legislative body in accordance with the Local Government Code. The mayor, vice mayor, and the councilors are elected directly by the people through an election which is being held every three years.

The town hall is located in front of the Roman Catholic convent of San Pedro y San Pablo de Calasiao, the same building as the shrine of Senor Divino Tesoro. The current mayor is Patrick A. Caramat, who took over the mayoralty post from Kevin Roy Macanlalay, following his victory in the May 2025 elections.

=== Elected officials ===
The town is currently led by Mayor Patrick A. Caramat, Vice Kevin Roy Q. Macanlalay, and eight other councilors.

Members of the Municipal Council (2025-2028)
Position	Name
Congressman	Maria Rachel Arenas
Mayor	Patrick A. Caramat
Vice-Mayor	Kevin Roy Q. Macanlalay
Councilors	Kyle Arthur B. Gasper
Councilors	Nestor A. Gabrillo
Councilors	Ardieson B. Soriano
Councilors	Manny D.V. Datuin
Councilors	Elias S. Villanueva
Councilors	Jose A. Loresco
Councilors	Myc D. Sison
Councilors	Haverdani Das B. Mesina
Liga ng mga Barangay President	Jose M. Paris Jr. (Nagsaing)
Sangguniang Kabataan Federation President	Narayana Rsi Das Mesina (Longos)

== Tourism ==
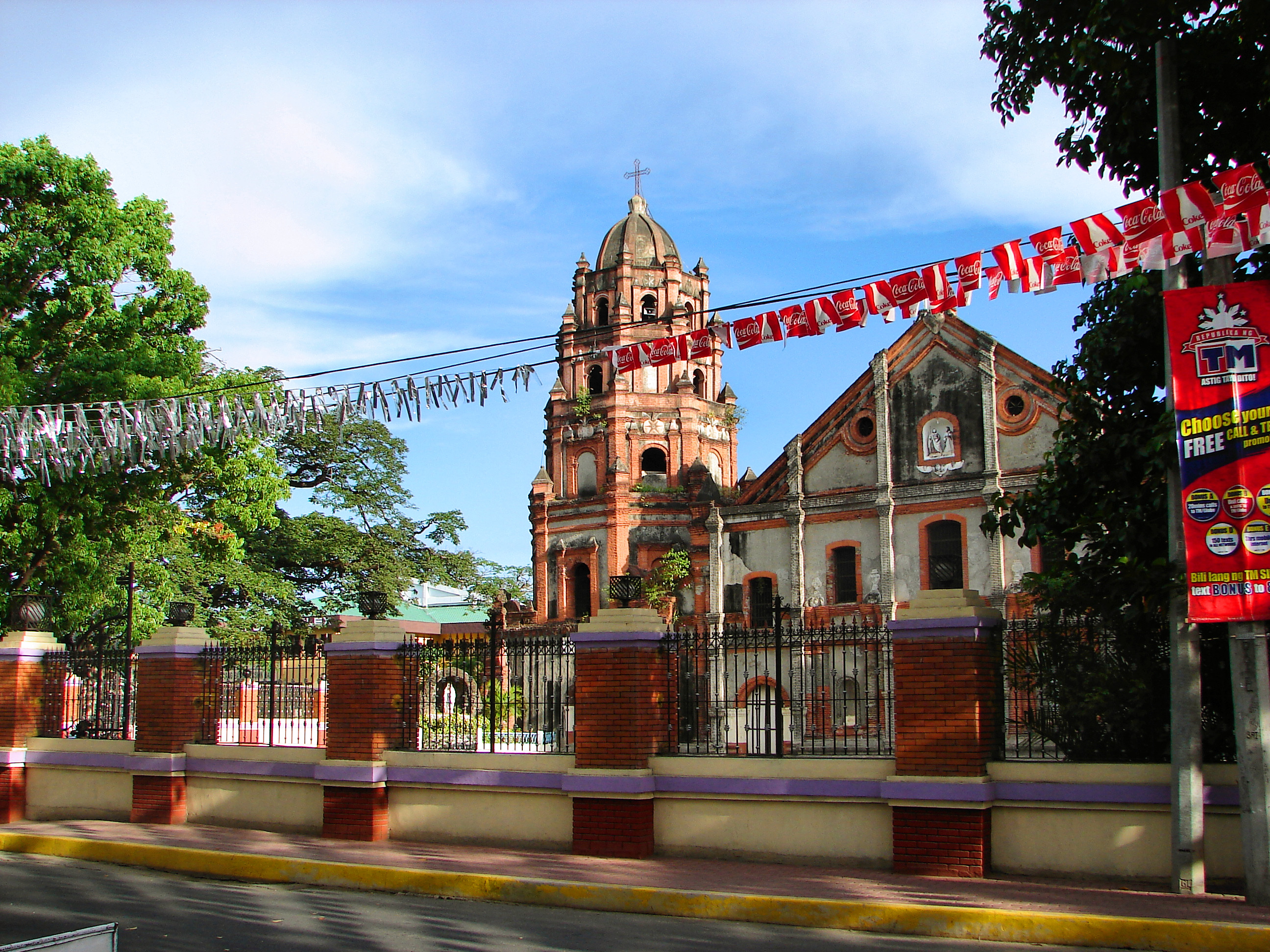
St. Peter and Paul Church (Poblacion West)

Calasiao is known for its puto, a soft rice cake; suman, a sweet coconut and sticky rice cake wrapped in banana leaves; and bagoong, or fermented fish paste. Calasiao puto is described as the town's "white gold." Puto Calasiao is a bite-size, soft rice cake made from semi-glutinous rice that is fermented in earthen jars. It is produced mainly in Barangay Dinalaoan.

Many pilgrims from neighbouring cities/towns and provinces visit Calasiao to pray at the Senor Divino Tesoro shrine. The statue of a crucified Jesus Christ is believed to grow in size and grant miracles.

=== Puto festival ===
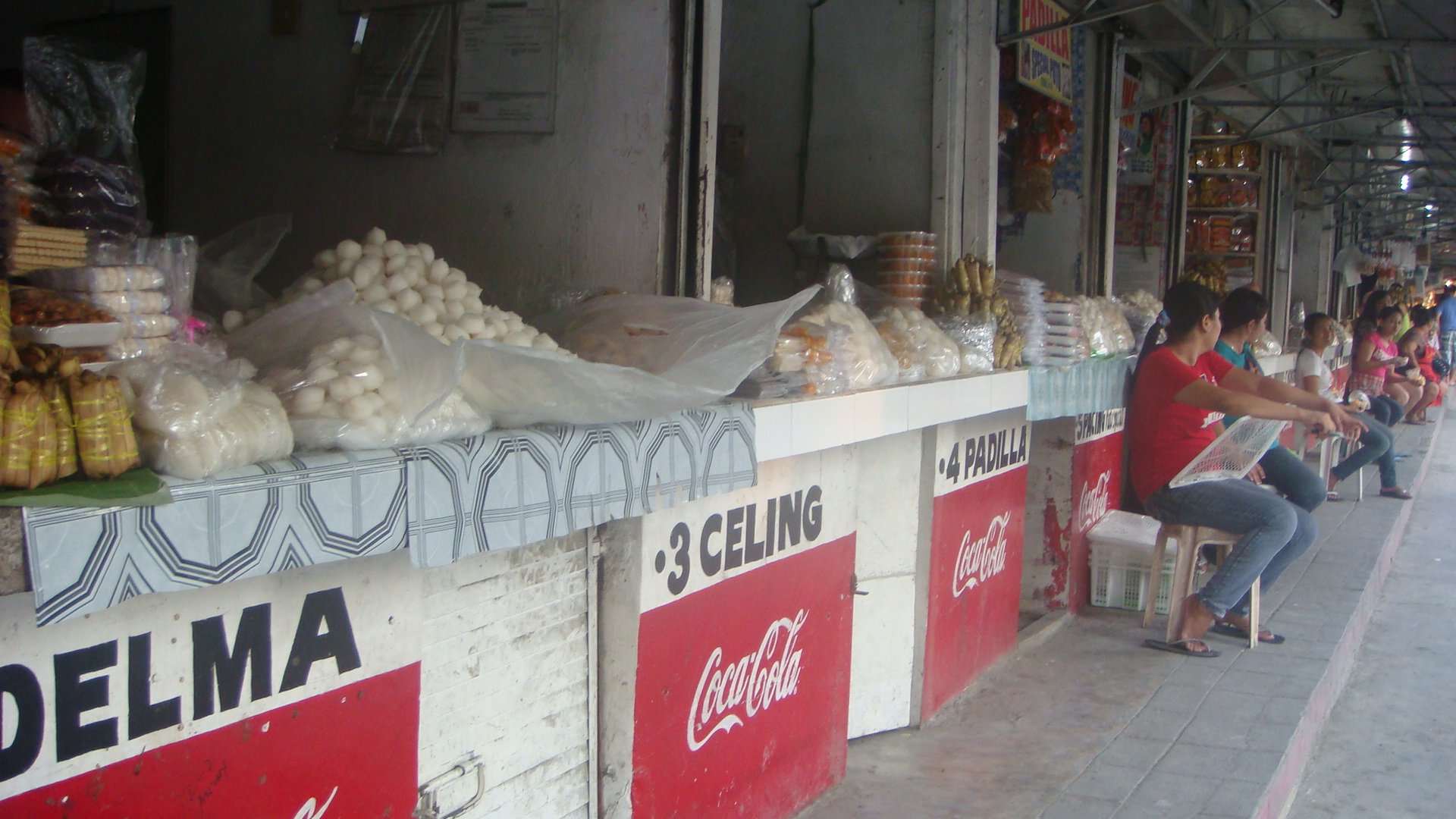
Special Puto Calasiao stores

Calasiao celebrates a puto industry festival. The Puto Calasiao is a rice cake that is well known all over the Philippines for its melt-in-the-mouth feeling. It is locally sold along the streets going to Sr. Divino Tesoro.

It is known for its "white gold": "cup-shaped, bite-sized, soft rice cakes; the semi-glutinous rice is fermented in old earthen jars" (in the barangays of Dinalaoan, Lumbang, Ambuetel, and a part of Nalsian).

Calasiao Puto Festival 2024

Puto Calasiao is made of long grain rice soaked in water, ground and fermented for three days of more, with just enough sugar to taste, and steamed. It can be topped with cheese or drizzled with chocolate syrup for variation. It is perfect to be paired with dinuguan. The town has the traditional white puto and many flavors like pandan (green), ube (violet), banana (yellow), strawberry (light red/pink) and cheese (gold).

The original white puto and kutsinta (another rice cake variety) is sold at P80 per kilogram (70 to 75 pieces), while the flavored ones are sold at P80 per kg. The price is higher by P15 to P20 in other areas to cover transportation costs.

Bella's Puto consumes three to six sacks of rice a day to make puto, depending on the season. Peak production period is from October to January. A sack of rice can produce 8,000 pieces or 107 kg of puto. Bella's Puto is sold at four SM shopping mall branches, in Santa Mesa (Manila), Baliwag (Bulacan), Clark (Pampanga) and Rosales (Pangasinan). It is also sold in a store in Caloocan and at the Pasalubong Center in Rosales town.

Bocayo (sweetened coconut) and dinuguan are also the best products of Nalsian Bacayao and Nalsian Centro. Calasiao celebrates its town fiesta every May 2 and 3: the feast day of Señor Divino Tesoro. Every June 28 and 29 is the fiesta of San Pedro and San Pablo, which were the dates of the Calasiao fiesta.

== Education ==
There are two schools district office which govern all educational institutions within the municipality. They oversee the management and operations of all private and public elementary and high schools. These are Calasiao I Schools District Office, and Calasiao I Schools District Office.

Bued Elementary School

=== Primary and elementary schools ===
- Ambonao Elementary School
- Ambuetel Elementary School
- Balani-Parongking Elementary School
- Balingit Constantino-Lasip Elementary School
- Banaoang Elementary School
- Blessed Generation Dream Academy
- Brilliant Achievers Learning Center
- Bued East Elementary School
- Bued Elementary School
- Buenlag Central School
- Cabilocaan Elementary School
- Calasiao Central School
- Calasiao Educational Center
- Carthel Science Educational Foundation
- Dinalaoan Elementary School
- Doyong Centro Elementary School
- Doyong Malabago Elementary School
- Elpidio P. Roy-Gabon Elementary School
- Idoldol Elementary School
- Longos Elementary School
- Lumbang Elementary School
- Macabito Elementary School
- Malabago Elementary School
- Mancup Elementary School
- Mother of Good Counsel Academy
- Nagsaing Elementary School
- Nalsian Bacayao Elementary School
- Quesban Elementary School
- San Miguel Elementary School
- San Vicente Elementary School
- Señor Tesoro Academy
- Sir Melan Learning Center
- Songkoy Elementary School
- Talibaew Elementary School

Doyong-Malabago National High School

=== Secondary schools ===
- Bued National High School
- Buenlag National High School
- Calasiao Comprehensive National High School
- Doyong-Malabago National High School
- Precious Minds Montessori and High School

Señor Tesoro College

=== Higher educational institutions ===
- AMA Computer College
- Philippine College of Science and Technology
- Señor Tesoro College
- Acatech Aviation Academy

== Notable personalities ==
- Mitoy Yonting
- Mariah Deborah
