= Sodium hydroxide =

Caustic soda, with formula NaOH

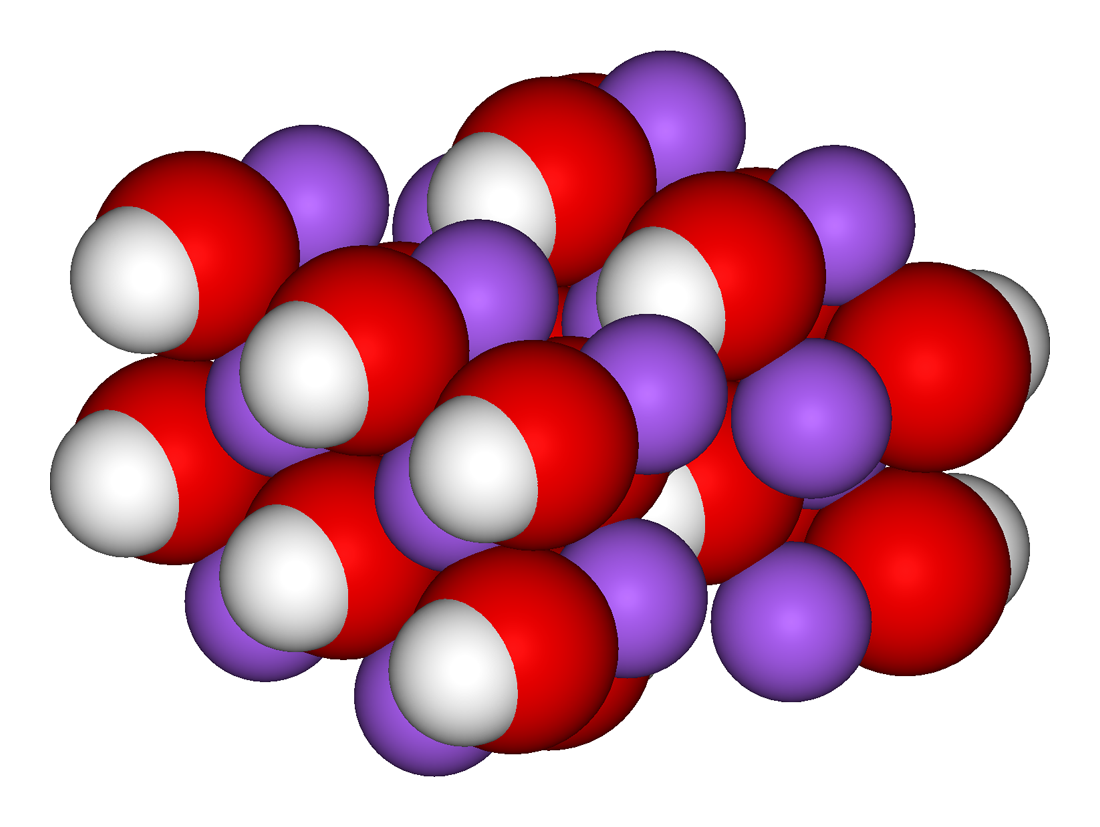
- Unit cell, spacefill model of sodium hydroxide Sodium, Na Oxygen, O Hydrogen, H

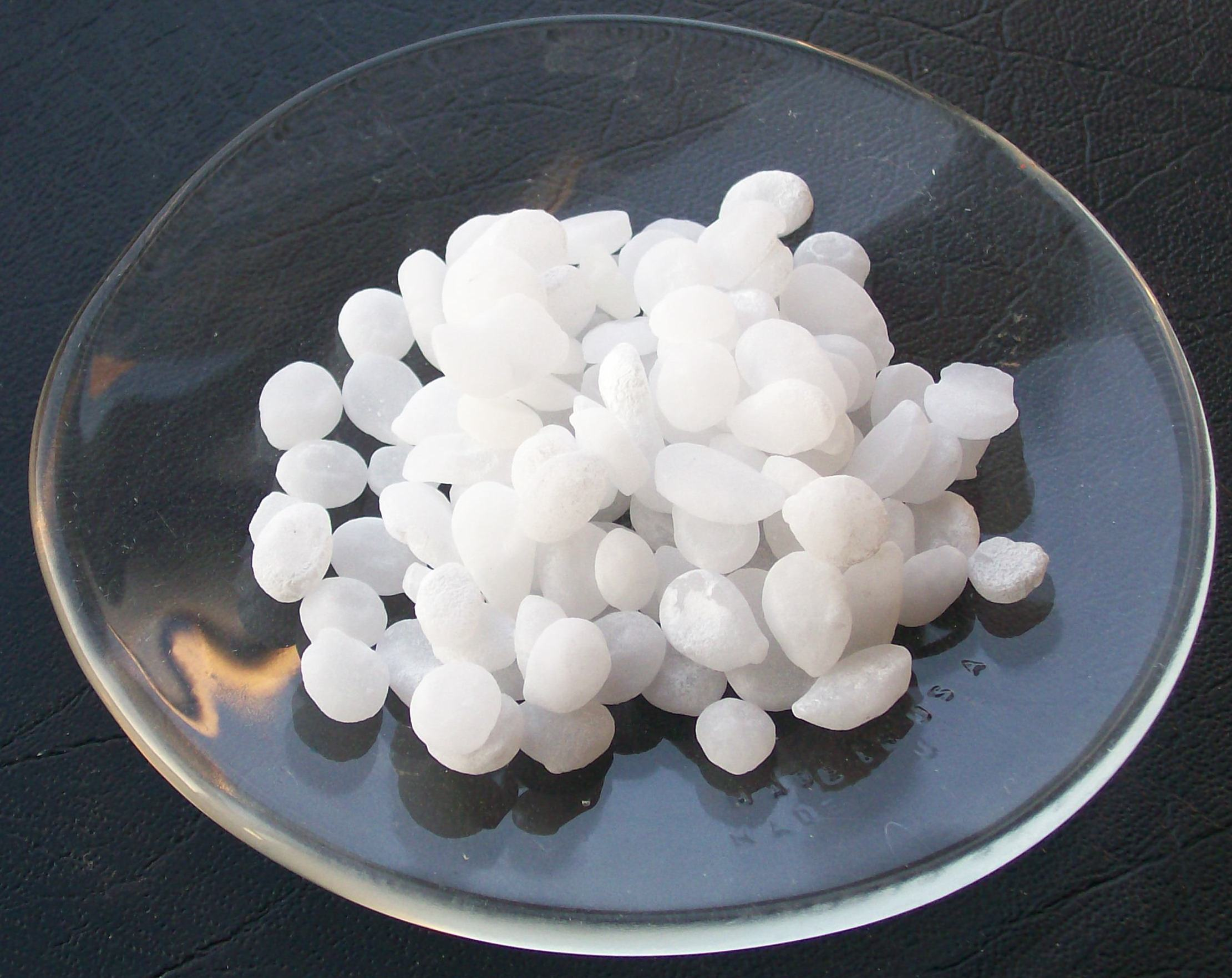
- Sample of sodium hydroxide as pellets in a watchglass

Names
- IUPAC name Sodium hydroxide
- Other names: Ascarite; Caustic soda; Lye; Soda lye; Sodium hydrate; White caustic

Identifiers
CAS Number	1310-73-2
3D model (JSmol)	Interactive image
ChEBI	CHEBI:32145
ChemSpider	14114
ECHA InfoCard	100.013.805
EC Number	215-185-5
E number	E524 (acidity regulators, ...)
Gmelin Reference	68430
KEGG	D01169
MeSH	Sodium+Hydroxide
PubChem CID	14798
RTECS number	WB4900000
UNII	55X04QC32I
UN number	1823 (solid); 1824 (solution)
CompTox Dashboard (EPA)	DTXSID0029634
- InChI: InChI=1S/Na.H2O/h;1H2/q+1;/p-1 Key: HEMHJVSKTPXQMS-UHFFFAOYSA-M; InChI=1/Na.H2O/h;1H2/q+1;/p-1 Key: HEMHJVSKTPXQMS-REWHXWOFAM
- SMILES: [OH-].[Na+]

Properties
Chemical formula	NaOH
Molar mass	39.997 g·mol^{−1}
Appearance	White, opaque crystals
Odor	odorless
Density	2.13 g/cm^{3}
Melting point	323 °C (613 °F; 596 K)
Boiling point	1,388 °C (2,530 °F; 1,661 K)
Solubility in water	418 g/L (0 °C); 1000 g/L (25 °C); 3370 g/L (100 °C)
Solubility	soluble in glycerol, negligible in ammonia, insoluble in ether, slowly soluble in propylene glycol
Solubility in methanol	238 g/L
Solubility in ethanol	139 g/L
Vapor pressure	<2.4 kPa (20 °C); 0.1 kPa (700 °C)
Acidity (pK_{a})	13.9 (Na^{+})
Basicity (pK_{b})	0.0 (OH^{−})
Magnetic susceptibility (χ)	−15.8·10^{−6} cm^{3}/mol (aq.)
Refractive index (n_{D})	1.3576

Structure
Crystal structure	Orthorhombic, oS8
Space group	Cmcm, No. 63
Lattice constant	a = 0.34013 nm, b = 1.1378 nm, c = 0.33984 nm
Formula units (Z)	4

Thermochemistry
Heat capacity (C)	59.5 J/(mol·K)
Std molar entropy (S^{⦵}_{298})	64.4 J/(mol·K)
Std enthalpy of formation (Δ_{f}H^{⦵}_{298})	−425.8 kJ/mol
Gibbs free energy (Δ_{f}G^{⦵})	−379.7 kJ/mol

Hazards
- GHS labelling
Pictograms	(GHS05: Corrosive) (GHS07: Exclamation mark)
Signal word	Danger
Hazard statements	H290, H302, H314
Precautionary statements	P280, P305+P351+P338, P310
NFPA 704 (fire diamond)	3 0 1 ALK
- Lethal dose or concentration (LD, LC)
LD_{50} (median dose)	40 mg/kg (mouse, intraperitoneal); 140 - 340 mg/kg (rat, oral); 1350 mg/kg (rabbit, dermal)
LD_{Lo} (lowest published)	500 mg/kg (rabbit, oral)
- NIOSH (US health exposure limits)
PEL (Permissible)	TWA 2 mg/m^{3}
REL (Recommended)	C 2 mg/m^{3}
IDLH (Immediate danger)	10 mg/m^{3}
Safety data sheet (SDS)	External SDS

Related compounds
Other anions	Sodium hydrosulfide; Sodium hydride; Sodium oxide
Other cations	Lithium hydroxide; Potassium hydroxide; Rubidium hydroxide; Caesium hydroxide; Francium hydroxide
Related compounds	Sodium deuteroxide; Sodium chloroxide
- Except where otherwise noted, data are given for materials in their standard state (at 25 °C [77 °F], 100 kPa). verify (what is ?) Infobox references

Sodium hydroxide, also known as caustic soda and, more generically, as lye, is an inorganic compound with the formula NaOH. It is a white solid ionic compound consisting of sodium cations Na^{+} and hydroxide anions OH^{−}. As a strong nucleophile, it is frequently used in SN2 reactions.

Sodium hydroxide is a highly corrosive base and alkali that decomposes lipids and proteins at ambient temperatures, and may cause severe chemical burns at high concentrations. It is highly soluble in water, and readily absorbs moisture and carbon dioxide from the air. It forms a series of hydrates NaOH·nH_{2}O. The monohydrate NaOH·H_{2}O crystallizes from water solutions between 12.3 and 61.8 °C. The commercially available "sodium hydroxide" is often this monohydrate, and published data may refer to it instead of the anhydrous compound.

As one of the simplest hydroxides, sodium hydroxide is frequently used alongside neutral water and acidic hydrochloric acid to demonstrate the pH scale to chemistry students.

Sodium hydroxide is used in many industries: in the making of wood pulp and paper, textiles, drinking water, soaps and detergents, and as a drain cleaner. Worldwide production in 2022 was approximately 83 million tons.

== Properties ==
=== Physical properties ===
Pure sodium hydroxide is a colorless crystalline solid that melts at 318 °C (604 °F) without decomposition and boils at 1,388 °C (2,530 °F). It is highly soluble in water, with a lower solubility in polar solvents such as ethanol and methanol. Sodium hydroxide is insoluble in ether and other non-polar solvents.

Similar to the hydration of sulfuric acid, dissolution of solid sodium hydroxide in water is a highly exothermic reaction where a large amount of heat is liberated, posing a threat to safety through the possibility of splashing. The resulting solution is usually colorless and odorless. As with other alkaline solutions, it feels slippery with skin contact due to the process of saponification that occurs between NaOH and natural skin oils.

==== Viscosity ====
Concentrated (50%) aqueous solutions of sodium hydroxide have a characteristic viscosity, 78 mPa·s, that is much greater than that of water (1.0 mPa·s) and near that of olive oil (85 mPa·s) at room temperature. The viscosity of aqueous NaOH, as with any liquid chemical, is inversely related to its temperature, i.e., its viscosity decreases as temperature increases, and vice versa. The viscosity of sodium hydroxide solutions plays a direct role in its application as well as its storage.

==== Hydrates ====
Sodium hydroxide can form several hydrates NaOH·nH_{2}O, which result in a complex solubility diagram that was described in detail by Spencer Umfreville Pickering in 1893. The known hydrates and the approximate ranges of temperature and concentration (mass percent of NaOH) of their saturated water solutions are:

- Heptahydrate, NaOH·7H_{2}O: from −28 °C (18.8%) to −24 °C (22.2%).
- Pentahydrate, NaOH·5H_{2}O: from −24 °C (22.2%) to −17.7 °C (24.8%).
- Tetrahydrate, NaOH·4H_{2}O, α form: from −17.7 °C (24.8%) to 5.4 °C (32.5%).
- Tetrahydrate, NaOH·4H_{2}O, β form: metastable.
- Trihemihydrate, NaOH·3.5H_{2}O: from 5.4 °C (32.5%) to 15.38 °C (38.8%) and then to 5.0 °C (45.7%).
- Trihydrate, NaOH·3H_{2}O: metastable.
- Dihydrate, NaOH·2H_{2}O: from 5.0 °C (45.7%) to 12.3 °C (51%).
- Monohydrate, NaOH·H_{2}O: from 12.3 °C (51%) to 65.10 °C (69%) then to 62.63 °C (73.1%).

Early reports refer to hydrates with n = 0.5 or n = 2/3, but later careful investigations failed to confirm their existence.

The only hydrates with stable melting points are NaOH·H_{2}O (65.10 °C) and NaOH·3.5H_{2}O (15.38 °C). The other hydrates, except the metastable ones NaOH·3H_{2}O and NaOH·4H_{2}O (β) can be crystallized from solutions of the proper composition, as listed above. However, solutions of NaOH can be easily supercooled by many degrees, which allows the formation of hydrates (including the metastable ones) from solutions with different concentrations.

For example, when a solution of NaOH and water with 1:2 mole ratio (52.6% NaOH by mass) is cooled, the monohydrate normally starts to crystallize (at about 22 °C) before the dihydrate. However, the solution can easily be supercooled down to −15 °C, at which point it may quickly crystallize as the dihydrate. When heated, the solid dihydrate might melt directly into a solution at 13.35 °C; however, once the temperature exceeds 12.58 °C it often decomposes into solid monohydrate and a liquid solution. Even the n = 3.5 hydrate is difficult to crystallize, because the solution supercools so much that other hydrates become more stable.

A hot water solution containing 73.1% (mass) of NaOH is a eutectic that solidifies at about 62.63 °C as an intimate mix of anhydrous and monohydrate crystals.

A second stable eutectic composition is 45.4% (mass) of NaOH, that solidifies at about 4.9 °C into a mixture of crystals of the dihydrate and of the 3.5-hydrate.

The third stable eutectic has 18.4% (mass) of NaOH. It solidifies at about −28.7 °C as a mixture of water ice and the heptahydrate NaOH·7H_{2}O.

When solutions with less than 18.4% NaOH are cooled, water ice crystallizes first, leaving the NaOH in solution.

The α form of the tetrahydrate has density 1.33 g/cm^{3}. It melts congruously at 7.55 °C into a liquid with 35.7% NaOH and density 1.392 g/cm^{3}, and therefore floats on it like ice on water. However, at about 4.9 °C it may instead melt incongruously into a mixture of solid NaOH·3.5H_{2}O and a liquid solution.

The β form of the tetrahydrate is metastable, and often transforms spontaneously to the α form when cooled below −20 °C. Once initiated, the exothermic transformation is complete in a few minutes, with a 6.5% increase in volume of the solid. The β form can be crystallized from supercooled solutions at −26 °C, and melts partially at −1.83 °C.

The "sodium hydroxide" of commerce is often the monohydrate (density 1.829 g/cm^{3}). Physical data in technical literature may refer to this form, rather than the anhydrous compound.

==== Crystal structure ====
NaOH and its monohydrate form orthorhombic crystals with the space groups Cmcm (oS8) and Pbca (oP24), respectively. The monohydrate cell dimensions are a = 1.1825, b = 0.6213, c = 0.6069 nm. The atoms are arranged in a hydrargillite-like layer structure, with each sodium atom surrounded by six oxygen atoms, three each from hydroxide ions and three from water molecules. The hydrogen atoms of the hydroxyls form strong bonds with oxygen atoms within each O layer. Adjacent O layers are held together by hydrogen bonds between water molecules.

=== Chemical properties ===
==== Reaction with acids ====
Sodium hydroxide reacts with protic acids to produce water and the corresponding salts. For example, when sodium hydroxide reacts with hydrochloric acid, sodium chloride is formed:

NaOH(aq) + HCl(aq) → NaCl(aq) + H_{2}O(l)

In general, such neutralization reactions are represented by one simple net ionic equation:

OH^{−}(aq) + H^{+}(aq) → H_{2}O(l)

This type of reaction with a strong acid releases heat, and hence is exothermic. Such acid–base reactions can also be used for titrations. However, sodium hydroxide is not used as a primary standard because it is hygroscopic and absorbs carbon dioxide from air.

==== Reaction with acidic oxides ====
Sodium hydroxide also reacts with acidic oxides, such as sulfur dioxide. Such reactions are often used to "scrub" harmful acidic gases (like SO_{2} and H_{2}S) produced in the burning of coal and thus prevent their release into the atmosphere. For example,

2 NaOH + SO_{2} → Na_{2}SO_{3} + H_{2}O

==== Reaction with metals and oxides ====
Glass reacts slowly with aqueous sodium hydroxide solutions at ambient temperatures to form soluble silicates. Because of this, glass joints and stopcocks exposed to sodium hydroxide have a tendency to "freeze". Flasks and glass-lined chemical reactors are damaged by long exposure to hot sodium hydroxide, which also frosts the glass. Sodium hydroxide does not attack iron at room temperature, since iron does not have amphoteric properties (i.e., it only dissolves in acid, not base). Nevertheless, at high temperatures (e.g. above 500 °C), iron can react endothermically with sodium hydroxide to form iron(III) oxide, sodium metal, and hydrogen gas. This is due to the lower enthalpy of formation of iron(III) oxide (−824.2 kJ/mol) compared to sodium hydroxide (−500 kJ/mol) and positive entropy change of the reaction, which implies spontaneity at high temperatures (ΔST > ΔH, ΔG < 0) and non-spontaneity at low temperatures (ΔST < ΔH, ΔG > 0). Consider the following reaction between molten sodium hydroxide and finely divided iron filings:

4 Fe + 6 NaOH → 2 Fe_{2}O_{3} + 6 Na + 3 H_{2}

A few transition metals, however, may react quite vigorously with sodium hydroxide under milder conditions.

In 1986, an aluminium road tanker in the UK was mistakenly used to transport 25% sodium hydroxide solution, causing pressurization of the contents and damage to tankers. The pressurization is due to the hydrogen gas which is produced in the reaction between sodium hydroxide and aluminium:

2 Al + 2 NaOH + 6 H_{2}O → 2 Na[Al(OH)_{4}] + 3 H_{2}

==== Precipitant ====
Unlike sodium hydroxide, which is soluble, the hydroxides of most transition metals are insoluble, and therefore sodium hydroxide can be used to precipitate transition metal hydroxides. The following colours are observed:

- Copper – blue
- Iron(II) – green
- Iron(III) – yellow/brown

Zinc and lead salts dissolve in excess sodium hydroxide to give a clear solution of Na_{2}ZnO_{2} or Na_{2}PbO_{2}.

Aluminium hydroxide is used as a gelatinous flocculant to filter out particulate matter in water treatment. Aluminium hydroxide is prepared at the treatment plant from aluminium sulfate by reacting it with sodium hydroxide or bicarbonate.

Al_{2}(SO_{4})_{3} + 6 NaOH → 2 Al(OH)_{3} + 3 Na_{2}SO_{4}
Al_{2}(SO_{4})_{3} + 6 NaHCO_{3} → 2 Al(OH)_{3} + 3 Na_{2}SO_{4} + 6 CO_{2}

==== Saponification ====
Sodium hydroxide can be used for the base-driven hydrolysis of esters (also called saponification), amides and alkyl halides. However, the limited solubility of sodium hydroxide in organic solvents means that the more soluble potassium hydroxide (KOH) is often preferred. Touching a sodium hydroxide solution with bare hands, while not recommended, produces a slippery feeling. This happens because oils on the skin such as sebum are converted to soap. Despite solubility in propylene glycol, it is unlikely to replace water in saponification due to propylene glycol's primary reaction with fat before reaction between sodium hydroxide and fat.

Mass fraction of NaOH (wt%)	4	10	20	30	40	50
Molar concentration of NaOH (M)	1.04	2.77	6.09	9.95	14.30	19.05
Mass concentration of NaOH (g/L)	41.7	110.9	243.8	398.3	572.0	762.2
Density of solution (g/mL)	1.043	1.109	1.219	1.328	1.430	1.524

== Production ==
Sodium hydroxide is industrially produced, first as a 32% solution, and then evaporated to a 50% solution by variations of the electrolytic chloralkali process. Chlorine gas is the main by-product from this process. Solid sodium hydroxide is obtained from this solution by the evaporation of water. Solid sodium hydroxide is most commonly sold as flakes, prills, and cast blocks.

In 2022, world production was estimated at 83 million dry tonnes of sodium hydroxide, and demand was estimated at 51 million tonnes. In 1998, total world production was around 45 million tonnes. North America and Asia each contributed around 14 million tonnes, while Europe produced around 10 million tonnes. In the United States, the major producer of sodium hydroxide is Olin, with annual production around 5.7 million tonnes. Other major US producers include Oxychem, Westlake, Shintech, and Formosa. All of these companies use the chloralkali process.

Historically, sodium hydroxide was produced by treating sodium carbonate with calcium hydroxide (slaked lime) in a metathesis reaction which takes advantage of the fact that sodium hydroxide is soluble, while calcium carbonate is not. This process was called causticizing.

Ca(OH)_{2}(aq) + Na_{2}CO_{3}(s) → CaCO_{3}(s) + 2 NaOH(aq)

The sodium carbonate for this reaction was produced by the Leblanc process in the early 19th century, or the Solvay process in the late 19th century. The conversion of sodium carbonate to sodium hydroxide was superseded entirely by the chloralkali process, which produces sodium hydroxide in a single process.

Sodium hydroxide is also produced by combining pure sodium metal with water. The byproducts are hydrogen gas and heat, often resulting in a flame.

2 Na(s) + 2 H_{2}O(l) → 2 NaOH(aq) + H_{2}(g)

This reaction is commonly used for demonstrating the reactivity of alkali metals in academic environments; however, it is not used commercially aside from a reaction within the mercury cell chloralkali process where sodium amalgam is reacted with water.

== Uses ==
Sodium hydroxide is a popular strong base used in industry. Sodium hydroxide is used in the manufacture of sodium salts and detergents, pH regulation, and organic synthesis. In bulk, it is most often handled as an aqueous solution, since solutions are cheaper and easier to handle.

Sodium hydroxide is used in many scenarios where it is desirable to increase the alkalinity of a mixture, or to neutralize acids. For example, in the petroleum industry, sodium hydroxide is used as an additive in drilling mud to increase alkalinity in bentonite mud systems, to increase the mud viscosity, and to neutralize any acid gas (such as hydrogen sulfide and carbon dioxide) which may be encountered in the geological formation as drilling progresses. Another use is in salt spray testing where pH needs to be regulated. Sodium hydroxide is used with hydrochloric acid to balance pH. The resultant salt, NaCl, is the corrosive agent used in the standard neutral pH salt spray test.

Poor quality crude oil, particularly of the sour variety, can be treated with sodium hydroxide to remove sulfurous impurities in a process known as caustic washing. Sodium hydroxide reacts with weak acids such as hydrogen sulfide and thiols to yield non-volatile sodium salts, which can be removed. The waste which is formed is toxic and difficult to deal with, and the process is banned in many countries because of this. In 2006, Trafigura used the process and then dumped the waste in Ivory Coast.

Other common uses of sodium hydroxide include:

- for making soaps and detergents. Sodium hydroxide is used for hard bar soap, while potassium hydroxide is used for liquid soaps. Sodium hydroxide is used more often than potassium hydroxide because it is cheaper and a smaller quantity is needed.
- as drain cleaners that convert pipe-clogging fats and grease into soap, which dissolves in water
- for making artificial textile fibres such as rayon
- in the manufacture of paper. Around 56% of sodium hydroxide produced is used by industry, 25% of which is used in the paper industry.
- in purifying bauxite ore from which aluminium metal is extracted. This is known as the Bayer process.
- de-greasing metals
- oil refining
- making dyes and bleaches
- in water treatment plants for pH regulation, for example to raise the pH and alkalinity of drinking water for corrosion control

=== Chemical pulping ===
Sodium hydroxide is also widely used in pulping of wood for making paper or regenerated fibers. Along with sodium sulfide, sodium hydroxide is a key component of the white liquor solution used to separate lignin from cellulose fibers in the kraft process. It also plays a key role in several later stages of the process of bleaching the brown pulp resulting from the pulping process. These stages include oxygen delignification, oxidative extraction, and simple extraction, all of which require a strong alkaline environment with a pH > 10.5 at the end of the stages.

=== Tissue digestion ===
In a similar fashion, sodium hydroxide is used to digest tissues, as in a process that was used with farm animals at one time. This process involved placing a carcass into a sealed chamber, then adding a mixture of sodium hydroxide and water (which breaks the chemical bonds that keep the flesh intact). This eventually turns the body into a liquid with a dark brown color, and the only solids that remain are bone hulls, which can be crushed between one's fingertips.

Sodium hydroxide is frequently used in the process of decomposing roadkill dumped in landfills by animal disposal contractors. Due to its availability and low cost, it has been used by criminals to dispose of corpses. Italian serial killer Leonarda Cianciulli used this chemical to turn dead bodies into soap. In Mexico, a man who worked for drug cartels admitted disposing of over 300 bodies with it.

Sodium hydroxide is a dangerous chemical due to its ability to hydrolyze protein. If a dilute solution is spilled on the skin, burns may result if the area is not washed thoroughly and for several minutes with running water. Splashes in the eye can be more serious and can lead to blindness.

=== Dissolving amphoteric metals and compounds ===
Strong bases attack aluminium. Sodium hydroxide reacts with aluminium and water to release hydrogen gas. The aluminium takes an oxygen atom from sodium hydroxide, which in turn takes an oxygen atom from water, and releases two hydrogen atoms. The reaction thus produces hydrogen gas and sodium aluminate. In this reaction, sodium hydroxide acts as an agent to make the solution alkaline, which aluminium can dissolve in.

2 Al + 2 NaOH + 2 H_{2}O → 2 NaAlO_{2} + 3 H_{2}

Sodium aluminate is an inorganic chemical that is used as an effective source of aluminium hydroxide for many industrial and technical applications. Pure sodium aluminate (anhydrous) is a white crystalline solid having a formula variously given as NaAlO_{2}, Na_{3}AlO_{3}, Na[Al(OH)_{4}], Na_{2}O·Al_{2}O_{3} or Na_{2}Al_{2}O_{4}. Formation of sodium tetrahydroxoaluminate(III) or hydrated sodium aluminate is given by:

2 Al + 2 NaOH + 6 H_{2}O → 2 Na[Al(OH)_{4}] + 3 H_{2}

This reaction can be useful in etching, removing anodizing, or converting a polished surface to a satin-like finish, but without further passivation such as anodizing or alodining the surface may become degraded, either under normal use or in severe atmospheric conditions.

In the Bayer process, sodium hydroxide is used in the refining of alumina containing ores (bauxite) to produce alumina (aluminium oxide) which is the raw material used to produce aluminium via the electrolytic Hall-Héroult process. Since the alumina is amphoteric, it dissolves in the sodium hydroxide, leaving impurities less soluble at high pH such as iron oxides behind in the form of a highly alkaline red mud.

Other amphoteric metals are zinc and lead which dissolve in concentrated sodium hydroxide solutions to give sodium zincate and sodium plumbate respectively.

=== Esterification and transesterification reagent ===
Sodium hydroxide is traditionally used in soap making (cold process soap, saponification). It was made in the nineteenth century for a hard surface rather than liquid product because it was easier to store and transport.

For the manufacture of biodiesel, sodium hydroxide is used as a catalyst for the transesterification of methanol and triglycerides. This only works with anhydrous sodium hydroxide, because combined with water the fat would turn into soap, which would be tainted with methanol. Due to production costs, sodium hydroxide, which is produced using common salt, is cheaper than potassium hydroxide.

=== Skincare ingredient ===
Sodium hydroxide is an ingredient used in some skin care and cosmetic products, such as facial cleansers, creams, lotions, and makeup. It is typically used in low concentration as a pH balancer, due its highly alkaline nature.

=== Food preparation ===
Food uses of sodium hydroxide include washing or chemical peeling of fruits and vegetables, chocolate and cocoa processing, caramel coloring production, poultry scalding, soft drink processing, and thickening ice cream. Olives are often soaked in sodium hydroxide for softening; pretzels and German lye rolls are glazed with a sodium hydroxide solution before baking to make them crisp. Owing to the difficulty in obtaining food grade sodium hydroxide in small quantities for home use, sodium carbonate is often used in place of sodium hydroxide. It is known as E number E524.

Specific foods processed with sodium hydroxide include:

- German pretzels are poached in a boiling sodium carbonate solution or cold sodium hydroxide solution before baking, which contributes to their unique crust.
- Lye water is an essential ingredient in the crust of the traditional baked Chinese moon cakes.
- Most yellow coloured Chinese noodles are made with lye water but are commonly mistaken for containing egg.
- One variety of zongzi uses lye water to impart a sweet flavor.
- Sodium hydroxide causes gelling of egg whites in the production of century eggs.
- Some methods of preparing olives involve subjecting them to a lye-based brine.
- The Filipino dessert (Filipino: kakanin) called kutsinta uses a small quantity of lye water to help give the rice flour batter a jelly-like consistency. A similar process is also used in the kakanin known as pitsi-pitsi or pichi-pichi except that the mixture uses grated cassava instead of rice flour.
- The Norwegian dish known as lutefisk (Norwegian: lutfisk, lit. 'lye fish').
- Bagels are often boiled in a lye solution before baking, contributing to their shiny crust.
- Hominy is dried maize (corn) kernels reconstituted by soaking in lye-water. These expand considerably in size and may be further processed by frying to make corn nuts or by drying and grinding to make grits. Hominy is used to create masa, a popular flour used in Mexican cuisine to make corn tortillas and tamales. Nixtamal is similar, but uses calcium hydroxide instead of sodium hydroxide.

=== Cleaning agent ===
Sodium hydroxide is frequently used as an industrial cleaning agent, where it is often called "caustic". It is added to water, heated, and then used to clean process equipment, storage tanks, and other things. It can dissolve grease, oils, fats and protein-based deposits. It is also used for cleaning waste discharge pipes under sinks and drains in domestic properties. Surfactants can be added to the sodium hydroxide solution in order to stabilize dissolved substances and thus prevent redeposition. A sodium hydroxide soak solution is used as a powerful degreaser on stainless steel and glass bakeware. It is also a common ingredient in oven cleaners.

A common use of sodium hydroxide is in the production of parts washer detergents. Parts washer detergents based on sodium hydroxide are some of the most aggressive parts washer cleaning chemicals. The sodium hydroxide-based detergents include surfactants, rust inhibitors and defoamers. A parts washer heats water and the detergent in a closed cabinet and then sprays the heated sodium hydroxide and hot water at pressure against dirty parts for degreasing applications. Sodium hydroxide used in this manner replaced many solvent-based systems in the early 1990s when trichloroethane was outlawed by the Montreal Protocol. Water and sodium hydroxide detergent-based parts washers are considered to be an environmental improvement over the solvent-based cleaning methods.

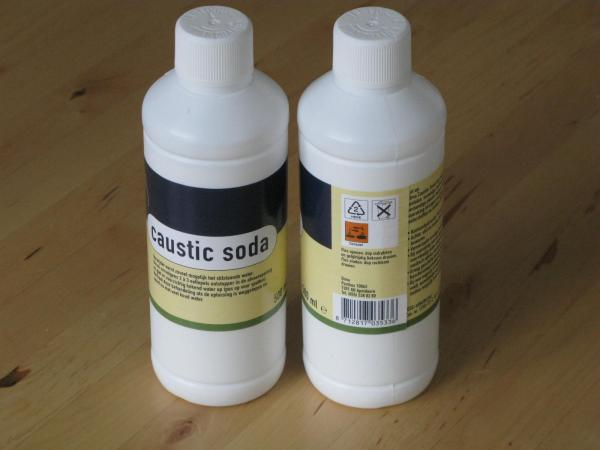
Hardware stores grade sodium hydroxide to be used as a type of drain cleaner.

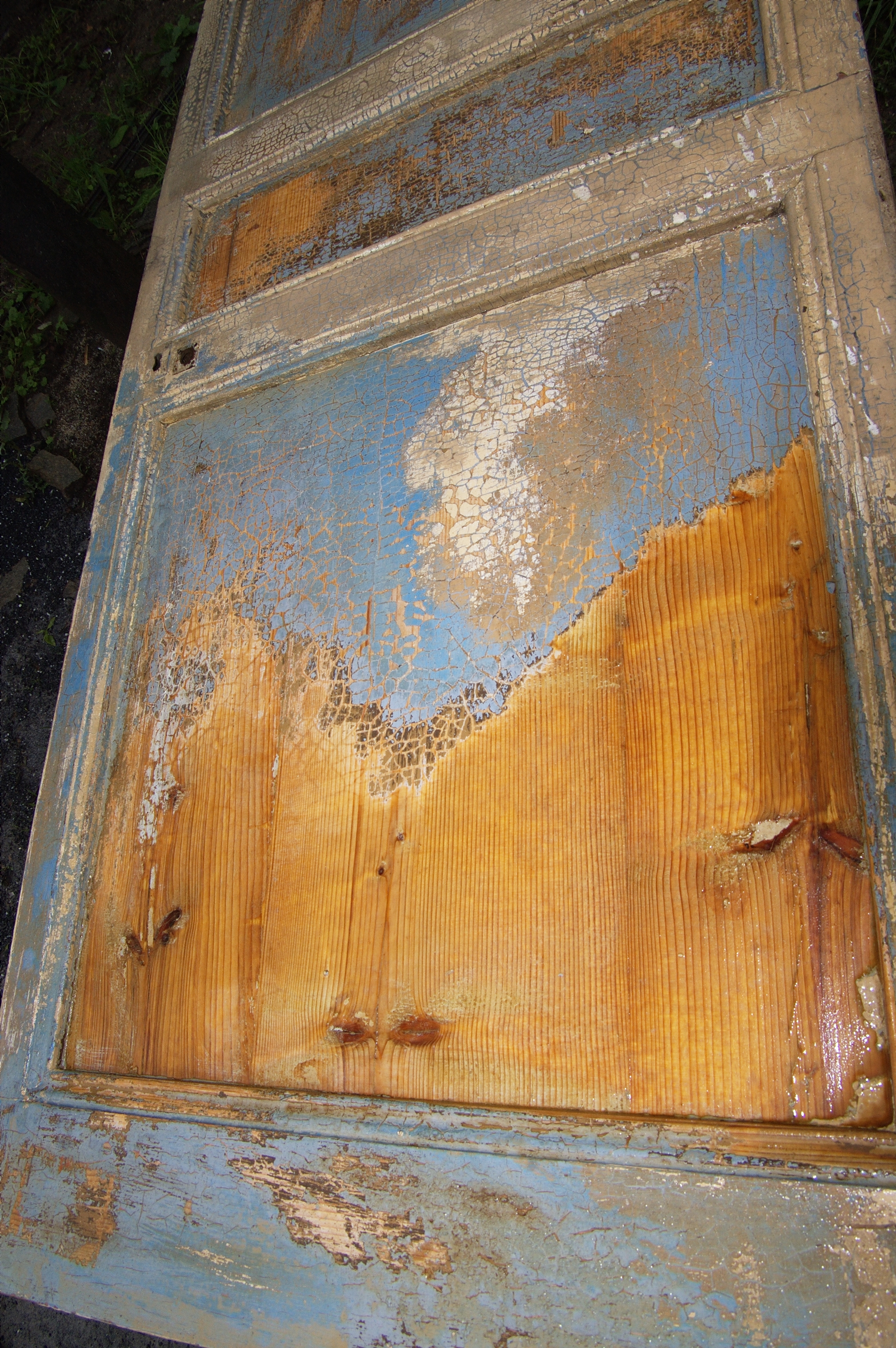
Paint stripping with caustic soda

Sodium hydroxide is used in the home as a type of drain openers to unblock clogged drains, usually in the form of a dry crystal or as a thick liquid gel. The alkali reacts with greases to produce water soluble soap and glycerol. It also hydrolyzes proteins, such as those found in hair, which may block waste water pipes. Dissolving sodium hydroxide in water is an exothermic reaction producing considerable quantities of heat which assists in speeding up the reactions with grease and other organic matter. Such alkaline drain cleaners and their acidic versions are highly corrosive and should be handled with great caution.

=== Relaxer ===
Sodium hydroxide is used in some relaxers to straighten hair. However, because of the high incidence and intensity of chemical burns, manufacturers of chemical relaxers use other alkaline chemicals in preparations available to consumers. Sodium hydroxide relaxers are still available, but they are used mostly by professionals.

=== Paint stripper ===
A solution of sodium hydroxide in water was traditionally used as the most common paint stripper on wooden objects. Its use has become less common, because it can damage the wood surface, raising the grain and staining the colour.

=== Water treatment ===
Sodium hydroxide is sometimes used during water purification to raise the pH of water supplies. Increased pH makes the water less corrosive to plumbing and reduces the amount of lead, copper and other toxic metals that can dissolve into drinking water.

=== Historical uses ===
Sodium hydroxide has been used for detection of carbon monoxide poisoning, with blood samples of such patients turning to a vermilion color upon the addition of a few drops of sodium hydroxide. Today, carbon monoxide poisoning can be detected by CO oximetry.

=== In cement mixes, mortars, concrete and grouts ===
Sodium hydroxide is used in some cement mix plasticisers. This helps homogenise cement mixes, preventing segregation of sands and cement, decreases the amount of water required in a mix and increases workability of the cement product, be it mortar, render or concrete.

== Safety ==
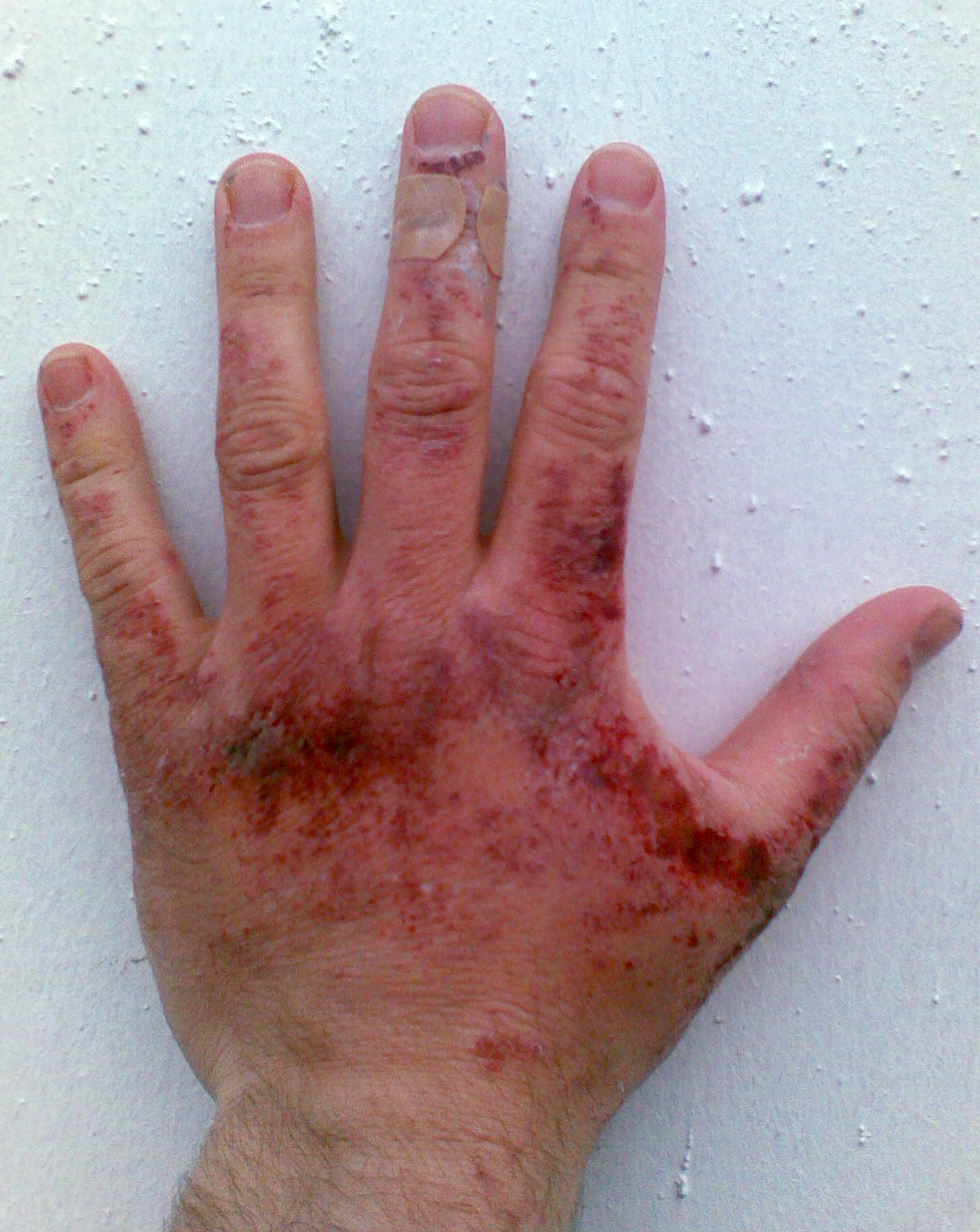
Chemical burns caused by sodium hydroxide solution, photographed 44 hours after exposure

Like other corrosive acids and alkalis, a few drops of sodium hydroxide solutions can readily decompose proteins and lipids in living tissues via amide hydrolysis and ester hydrolysis, which consequently cause chemical burns and may induce permanent blindness upon contact with eyes. Solid alkali can also express its corrosive nature if there is water, such as water vapor. Thus, protective equipment, like rubber gloves, safety clothing and eye protection, should always be used when handling this chemical or its solutions. The standard first aid measures for alkali spills on the skin is, as for other corrosives, irrigation with large quantities of water. Washing is continued for at least ten to fifteen minutes.

Moreover, dissolution of sodium hydroxide is highly exothermic, and the resulting heat may cause heat burns or ignite flammables. It also produces heat when reacted with acids.

Sodium hydroxide is mildly corrosive to glass, which can cause damage to glazing or cause ground glass joints to bind. Sodium hydroxide is corrosive to several metals, including aluminium, which reacts with the alkali to produce flammable hydrogen gas on contact.

Sodium hydroxide's toxicity level for fish is around 20–200 mg/L and is associated with increased pH value. However, as it is quickly neutralized and does not accumulate, its effect on the environment is usually easily handled.

== Storage ==
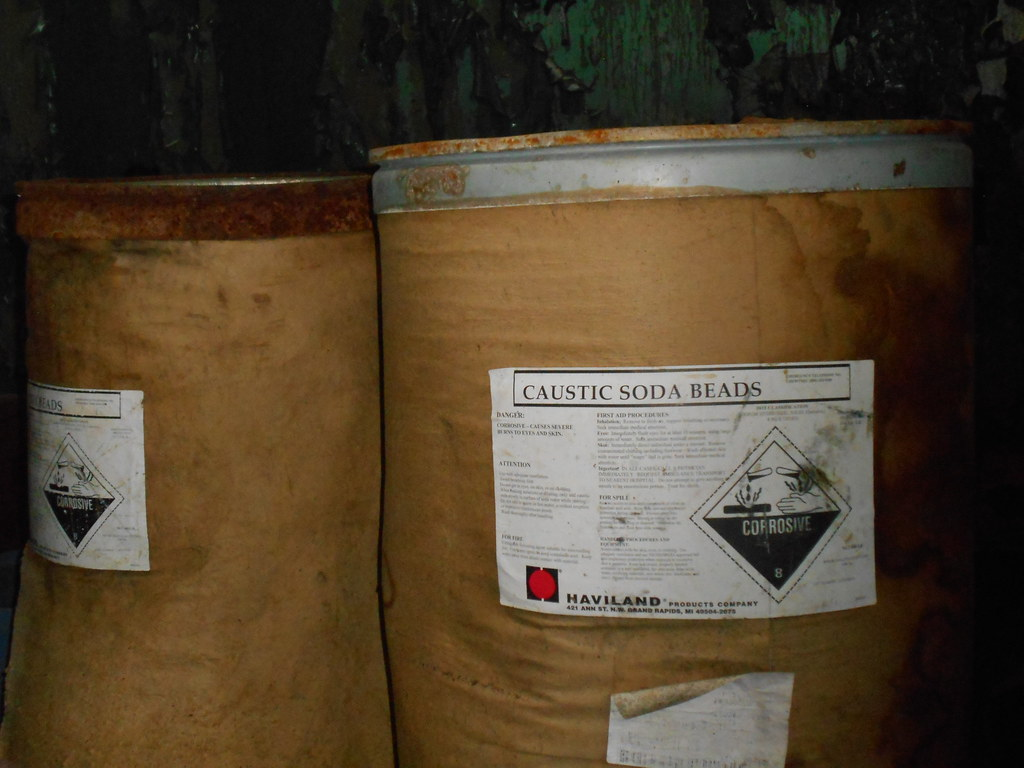
Two industrial fiberglass barrels of caustic-soda

Careful storage is needed when handling sodium hydroxide for use, especially bulk volumes. Following proper NaOH storage guidelines and maintaining worker/environment safety is always recommended given the chemical's burn hazard.

Sodium hydroxide is often stored in bottles for small-scale laboratory use, within intermediate bulk containers (medium volume containers) for cargo handling and transport, or within large stationary storage tanks with volumes up to 100,000 gallons for manufacturing or waste water plants with extensive NaOH use. Common materials that are compatible with sodium hydroxide and often utilized for NaOH storage include: polyethylene (HDPE, usual, XLPE, less common), carbon steel, polyvinyl chloride (PVC), stainless steel, and fiberglass reinforced plastic (FRP, with a resistant liner).

Sodium hydroxide must be stored in airtight containers to preserve its normality as it will absorb water and carbon dioxide from the atmosphere.

== History ==
Sodium hydroxide was first prepared by soap makers. A procedure for making sodium hydroxide appeared as part of a recipe for making soap in an Arab book of the late 13th century: Al-mukhtara' fi funun min al-suna' (Inventions from the Various Industrial Arts), which was compiled by al-Muzaffar Yusuf ibn 'Umar ibn 'Ali ibn Rasul (d. 1295), a king of Yemen.

The recipe called for passing water repeatedly through a mixture of alkali (Arabic: al-qily, where qily is ash from saltwort plants, which are rich in sodium; hence alkali was impure sodium carbonate) and quicklime (calcium oxide, CaO), whereby a solution of sodium hydroxide was obtained. European soap makers also followed this recipe. When in 1791 the French chemist and surgeon Nicolas Leblanc (1742–1806) patented a process for mass-producing sodium carbonate, natural "soda ash" (impure sodium carbonate that was obtained from the ashes of plants that are rich in sodium) was replaced by this artificial version. However, by the 20th century, the electrolysis of sodium chloride had become the primary method for producing sodium hydroxide.

== See also ==
- Acid and base
- HAZMAT Class 8 Corrosive Substances
- List of cleaning agents

== Bibliography ==
- Haynes, William M., ed. (2011). CRC Handbook of Chemistry and Physics (92nd ed.). CRC Press. ISBN 978-1439855119.
