= Puto Calasiao =

Filipino soft steamed rice cake

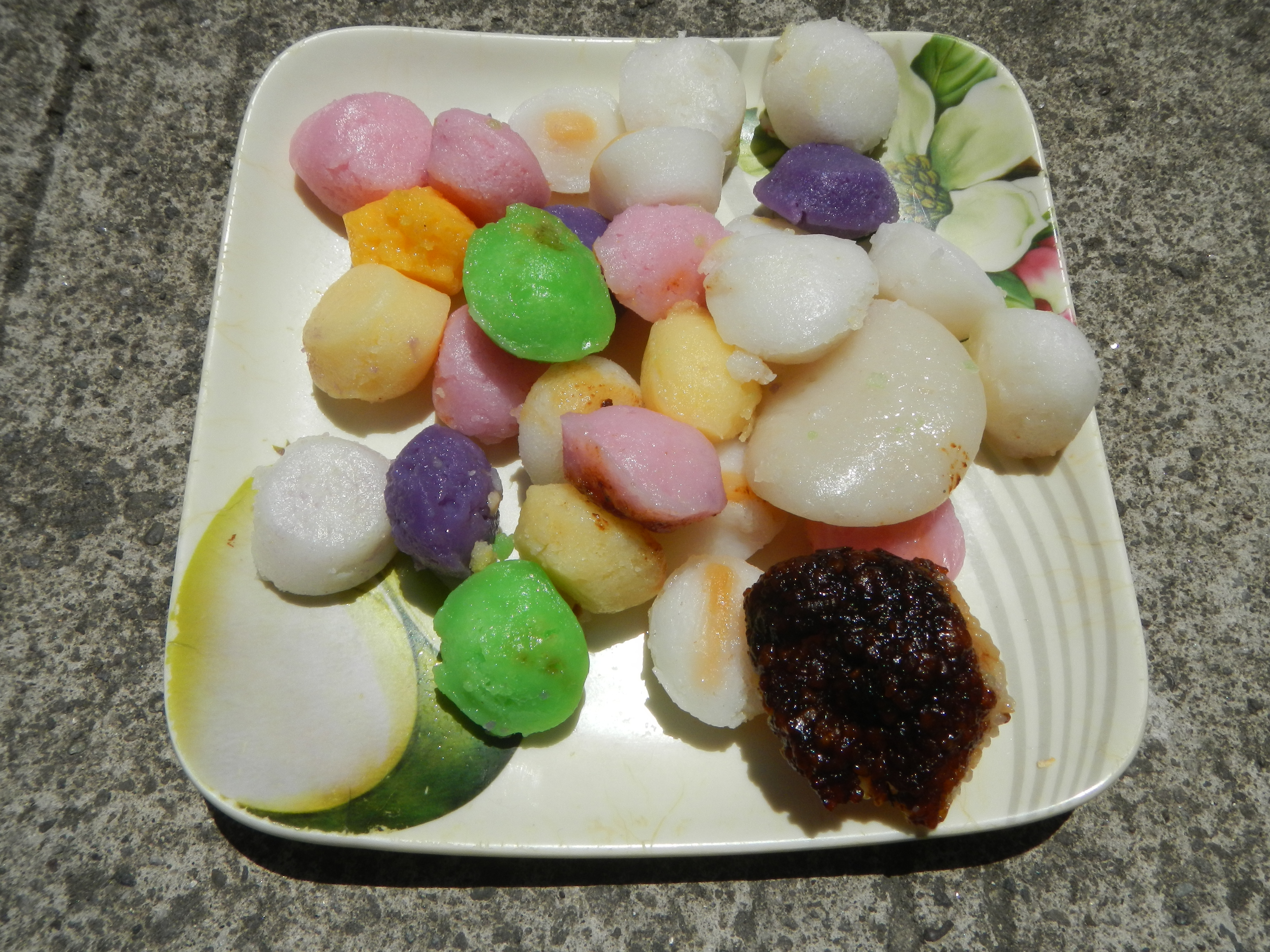
- Type: Rice cake
- Course: Dessert, merienda, or snack
- Place of origin: Philippines
- Region or state: Pangasinan region
- Serving temperature: Hot, warm, room temperature
- Main ingredients: Semi-glutinous rice, water, sugar
- Variations: Puto
- Similar dishes: Kutsinta

Puto Calasiao is a type of Filipino soft steamed rice cake well-known throughout the Philippines for its melt-in-the-mouth texture. It is a type of puto (steamed rice cake) shaped in small bite-sized portions.

== Etymology ==
Puto stores along Mamaradlo Street, Poblacion, Calasiao, Pangasinan

The name is derived from Tagalog puto (steamed rice cake) and Calasiao, its place of origin.

== Description ==
Puto Calasiao is a type of puto (steamed rice cake) shaped in bite-sized portions and is made from semi-glutinous rice that is soaked in water, ground and fermented alongside sugar to taste in earthen jars for at least three days, and steamed. It can be topped with cheese or drizzled with chocolate syrup for variation.

The tradition of Puto Calasiao dates back to the early 1900s and originated in the town of Calasiao in Pangasinan, from which it takes its name. Considered the town's "white gold" and iconic delicacy, Puto Calasiao is known for being sweet, fluffy, chewy, and cup-shaped, with small, bite-sized soft rice cakes.

== Festival ==
The Puto Calasiao Festival is celebrated every early December in Calasiao, Pangasinan, in the Philippines. It is the town's pride and cultural heritage. During the festival, the local villagers and people outside the region come in for the culinary competition for varieties of Puto Calasiao and to celebrate the feast. The festival promotes unity in its community.

== See also ==
- Puto
- Kutsinta
