= Mont kywe the =

Burmese rice cake pudding

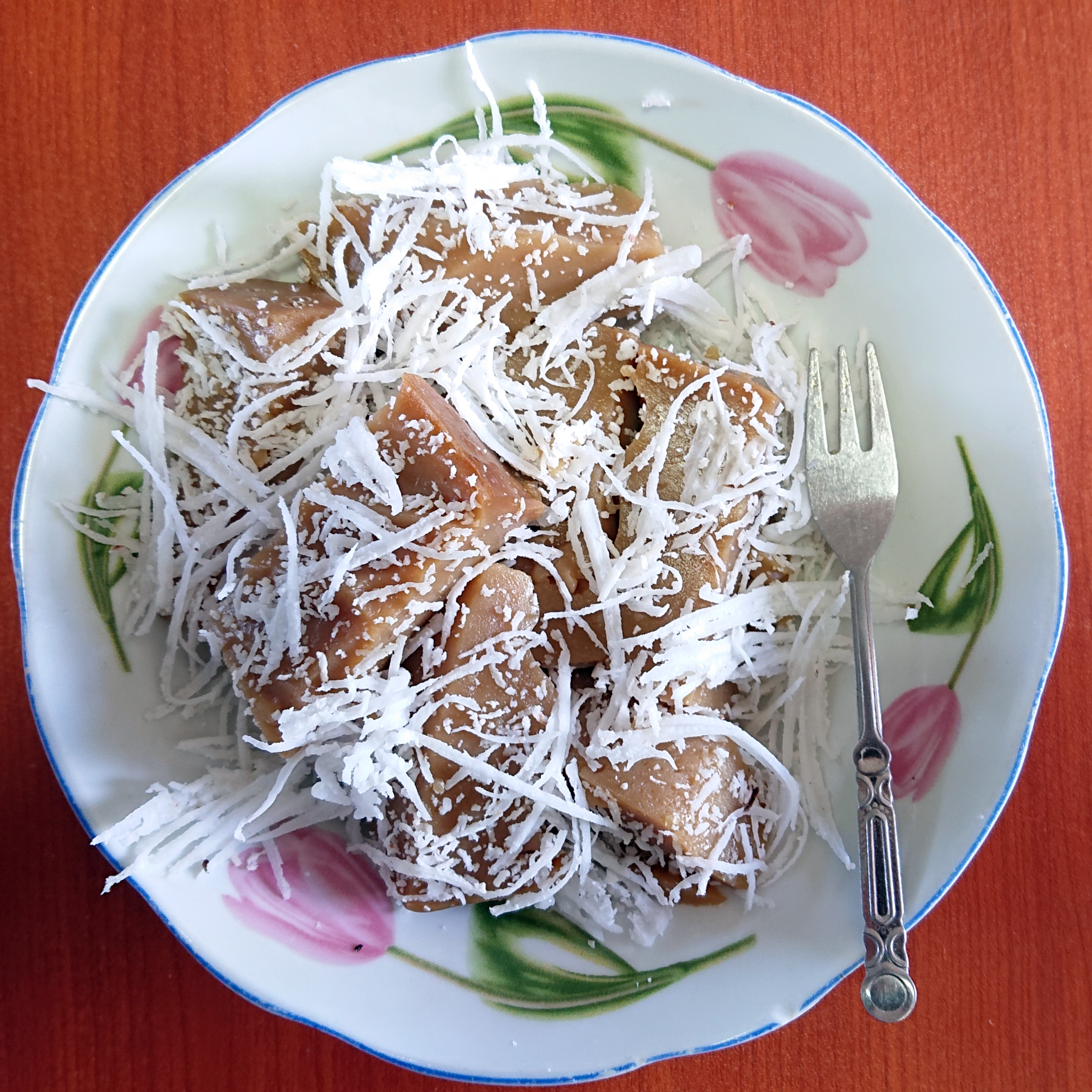
- Type: Snack (mont)
- Place of origin: Myanmar (Burma)
- Region or state: Southeast Asia
- Associated cuisine: Burmese
- Main ingredients: rice flour, limewater, jaggery, coconut shavings
- Similar dishes: Kutsinta, kuih kosui

Mont kywe the (Burmese: မုန့်ကျွဲသည်း; pronounced [mo̰ʊɴt͡ɕwɛ́ðɛ́], lit. 'buffalo liver cake') is a traditional Burmese snack or mont. It bears resemblance to the Indonesian and Malaysian kuih kosui and Filipino kutsinta.

This snack is a rice cake pudding made of rice flour, jaggery, salt, and alkaline limewater. After cooking, the pudding is served up in slices and garnished with coconut shavings. Mont kywe the uses rice flour milled from kauk kyan (ကောက်ကြမ်း), which has a high amylose content.
