= Kuih kosui =

Malaysian steamed rice cake

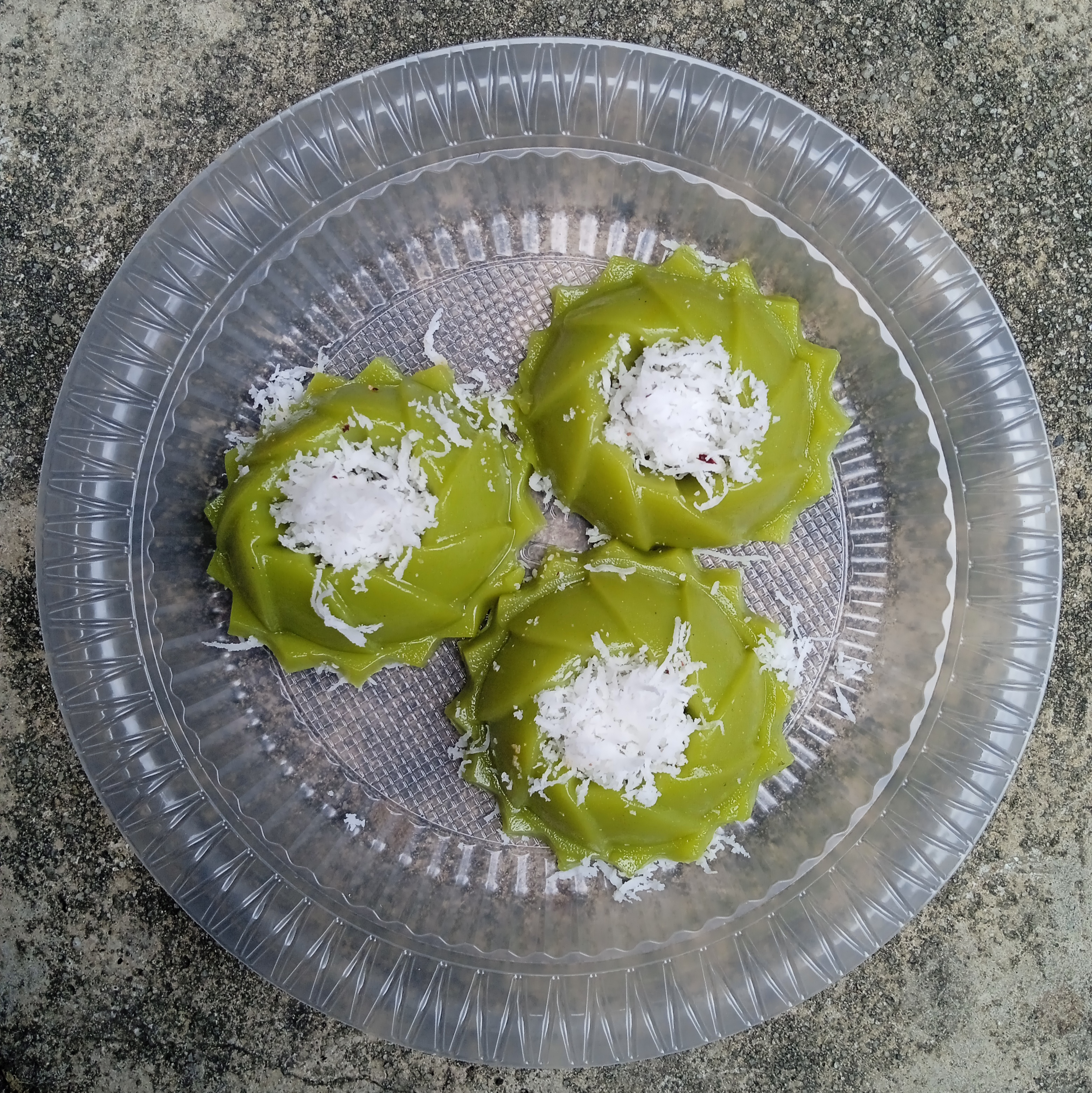
- Alternative names: Kuih lompang
- Type: Kuih
- Place of origin: Malaysia
- Region or state: Southeast Asia
- Associated cuisine: Malay cuisine
- Main ingredients: rice flour, tapioca flour, limewater, palm sugar, pandan
- Similar dishes: Mont kywe the, Kutsinta

Kuih kosui, also known as kuih lompang (Jawi: کوءيه لومڤڠ), is a traditional Malaysian cake. The kuih is a steamed rice cake made with tapioca flour and rice flour flavoured with palm sugar and pandan, and eaten with grated coconut. It bears resemblance to the Burmese mont kywe the and Filipino kutsinta.

== See also ==
- Kuih
- Mont kywe the, a similar Burmese dish
- Kutsinta, a similar Filipino dish
