= Drain cleaner =

Chemical mixture for unblocking plumbing drains

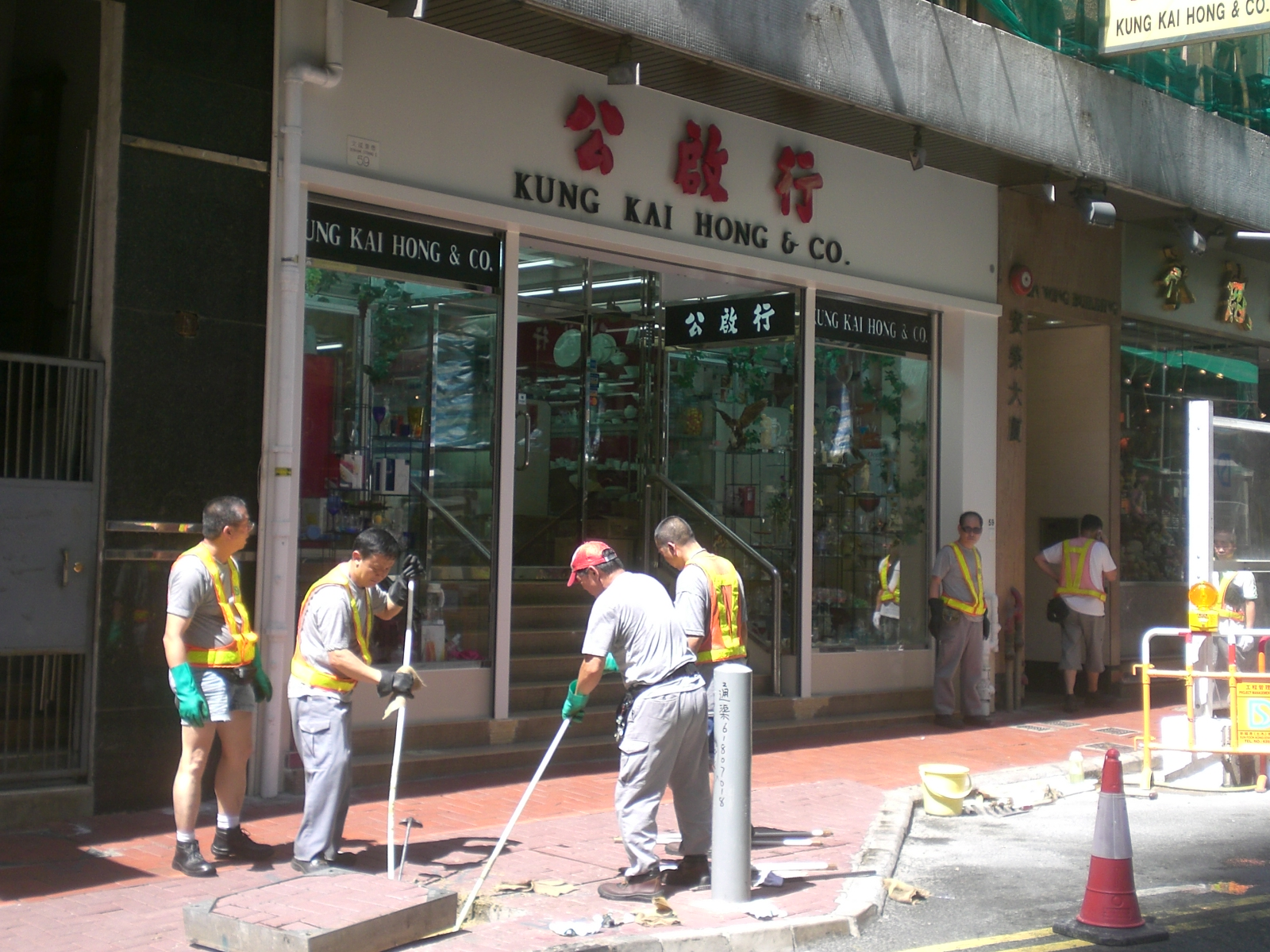
Workers cleaning a drain

A drain cleaner, also known as a drain opener, is a person, device, or product used to unblock sewer pipes or clear clogged wastewater drains. This term typically applies to chemical, enzymatic, and mechanical tools such as commercial chemical cleaners, plumber's snakes, drain augers, bio-enzyme solutions, or toilet plungers. In some contexts, it may also refer to a plumber or professional who specializes in drain cleaning and maintenance.

A chemical drain cleaner, plunger, handheld drain auger, or air-burst drain cleaner is typically used to address a clog in a single drain, such as in a sink, toilet, bathtub, or shower. These tools are effective at removing soft obstructions, such as hair and grease, that accumulate near the drain inlet. However, excessive use of chemical drain cleaners can lead to pipe damage. In contrast, enzymatic drain cleaners rely on enzymes to break down organic matter such as grease, hair, and food particles, offering a more environmentally friendly solution that avoids harsh chemicals.

If more than one plumbing fixture is clogged, then an electric drain cleaner, sewer jetter or other mechanical device is usually required to clear an obstruction in an inaccessible part of a drain piping system, anywhere from drain inlets through main building drains and lateral piping outside a building to a collector sewer main.

== History ==
The history of drain cleaners parallels the development of common drain systems themselves. As a result, there is not an extensive history of cleaners in the US, as municipal plumbing systems were not readily available in middle-class American homes until the early 20th century. Before this time, Americans often discarded the dirty water collected in basins after use. Limited piping systems gradually developed with lead materials, but after WWI, when the poisonous properties of lead became more well-known, piping was reconstructed with galvanized iron.

Galvanized iron is actually steel coated with a protective layer of zinc, but it was soon discovered that this zinc layer naturally corroded when exposed to the atmosphere, rainwater, cement, runoff, etc. Once corrosion reached the base metal, porous plaques and rust would form, leading to sediment buildup that would gradually clog these drains.

The problems with corroding galvanized iron pipes eventually led to their replacement by copper or plastic (PVC) piping by the 1960s. Natural substances such as hair, grease, and other oils continued to cause drain clogs, prompting the development of chemical drain cleaners and mechanical tools to clear them.

== Chemical drain openers ==
These commercial products usually contain corrosive acids or alkalis to unclog organic materials, including proteins, lipids, and carbohydrates.

== Enzyme drain cleaners ==
Enzyme drain cleaners are biodegradable cleaning solutions that clear clogs and maintain drainage systems through natural enzymatic reactions.

The enzymatic process facilitates the decomposition of these materials into smaller, water-soluble molecules, which are then more easily flushed without harming the plumbing infrastructure or the environment. While enzyme drain cleaners are effective for regular maintenance and preventing minor clogs, they may not be suitable for severe blockages.

== Handheld drain augers ==
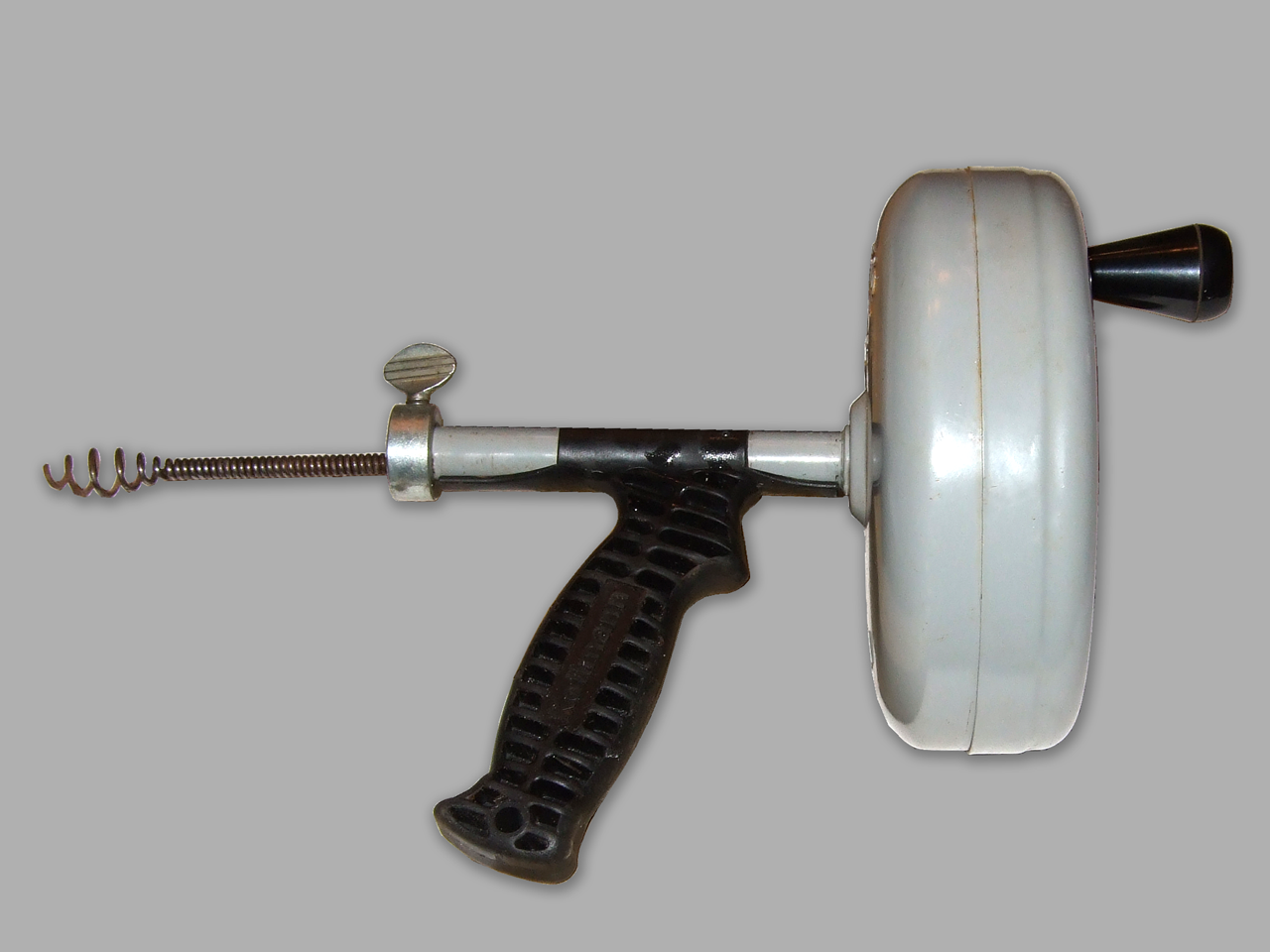
Handheld drain auger

Handheld drain augers are typically designed to clean portions of a drain within 25 feet (7.6 m) of the drain opening. The springy, flexible cable of a handheld drain auger is pushed into a drain while the operator rotates a drum that anchors the cable. Similar to handheld augers, drain rods can be used for clearing blockages in long, straight runs of pipe.

Many handheld augers have cables thin enough to pass through common sink traps, but manufacturers do not recommend using them in toilets because they can scratch ceramic surfaces. Instead, a special closet auger (from "water closet") should be used.

Advantages of handheld drain augers include their relatively low cost and ready availability at hardware stores. However, drawbacks include a reach typically limited to 25 feet (7.6 m) and the potential for the twisting cable to scratch the ceramic surfaces of plumbing fixtures. They are also only effective on small-diameter pipes (40–50 millimetres (1.6–2.0 in)) rather than main sewer pipes (110 millimetres (4.3 in)).

Safety considerations include wearing protective gloves and eye protection, and practicing good hygiene after contact with drain fluids.

== Air-burst drain cleaners ==
Air-burst drain cleaners use accelerated carbon dioxide, air, or other gases to rupture the clog membrane. Accelerated gas exerts a force on standing water, dislodging clogs that accumulate near drain openings.

Advantages of air-burst drain cleaners include the potential to clear clogs and slow-running drains immediately, in contrast to chemical cleaners that may take longer to work. Air-burst cleaners can dislodge obstructions farther from drain openings than a plunger can, and, unlike drain augers, do not risk scratching the ceramic surfaces of sinks, bathtubs, and toilets.

Disadvantages of air-burst drain cleaners include a limited cleaning range in pipes without standing water and, in general, ineffectiveness at unclogging blocked main sewer drains.

Safety considerations for air-burst drain cleaners include wearing eye protection and, when using an air-burst cleaner with compressed gas cartridges, careful handling of unused cartridges.

== Hydro-mechanical drain cleaners ==
Hydro-mechanical drain cleaning uses high-pressure water to break up obstructions and flush these smaller particles down the drain.

Most municipal building codes mandate that drain plumbing increase in diameter as it approaches the municipal sewer system. i.e., most kitchen sinks drain through a 1 1/2-inch drain pipe, which feeds into a larger 4-inch drain pipe in the main plumbing stack before heading to a septic tank or the city sewage system. This means that, barring intrusion by tree roots or other debris into buried piping, the vast majority of household drain clogs occur in the smallest-diameter piping, usually in the pop-up or drain trap, where they can be reached easily by a hydro-mechanical device's water hose.

Advantages of hydro-mechanical drain cleaners are their eco-friendliness (most use only tap water), their ability to dislodge and remove clogs like sand or cat litter that 'back-fill when using a conventional snake, and their friendliness to plumbing joints. Unlike air-burst cleaners, hydro-mechanical drain cleaners do not pressurize plumbing joints. On some models of hydro-mechanical drain cleaners, both hot and cold water can be used, providing added cleaning power for fat, protein, or other easily melting drain clogs.

Disadvantages of hydro-mechanical drain cleaners include limited reach into the drain plumbing and the need for a water source to serve as the motive agent.

Safety considerations for hydro-mechanical drain cleaners include the risk of injury from high-pressure water contacting skin or delicate areas of the body (e.g., eyes and face).

== Electric drain cleaners ==
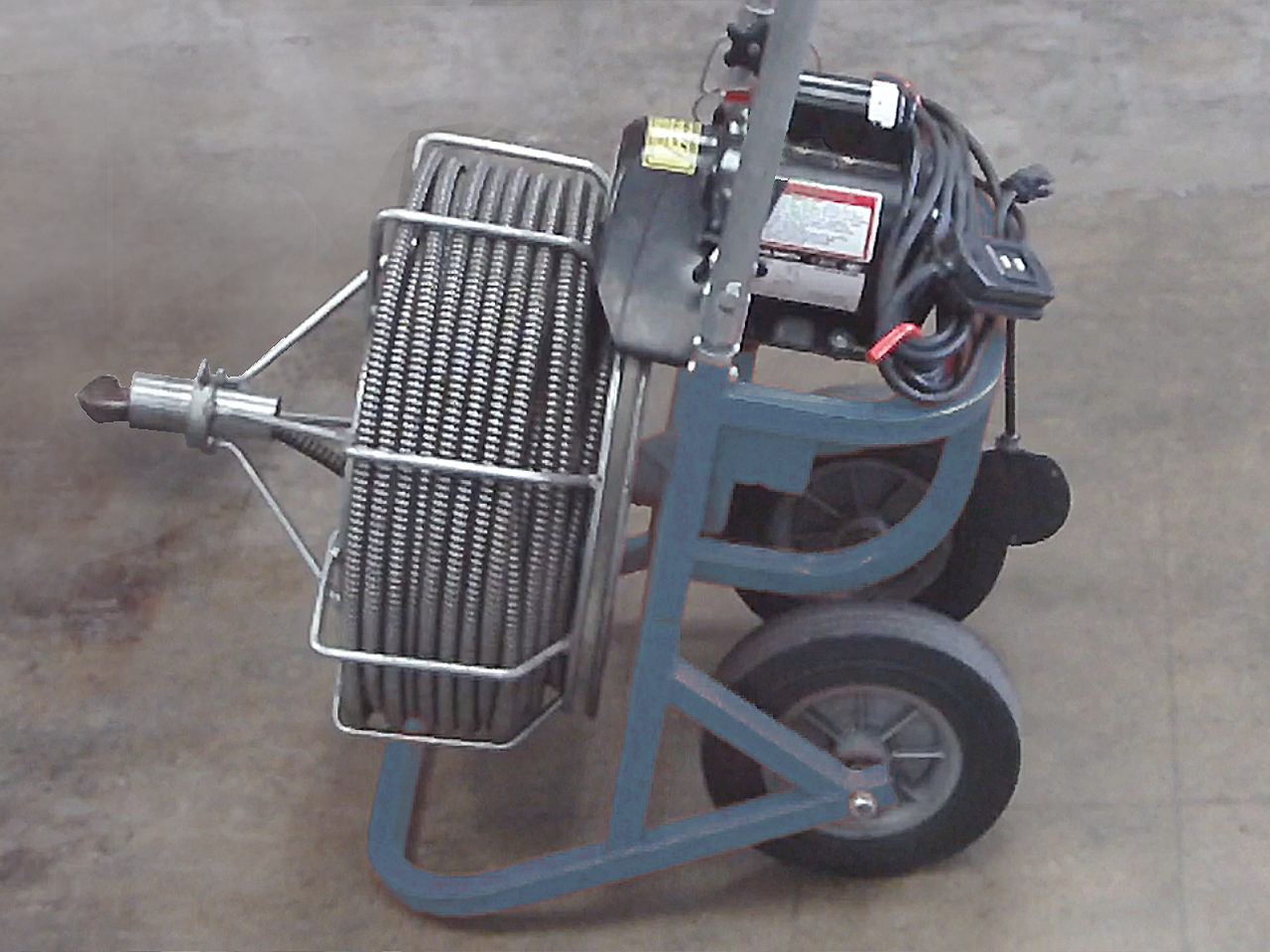
Electric drain cleaner

Electric drain cleaners, also called plumber's snakes, use the mechanical force of an electric motor to twist a flexible cable or spring in a clockwise direction and drive it into a pipe. Electric drain cleaners are commonly available in cable lengths of up to 40 meters and can reach 80 meters.

Advantages of electric drain cleaners include the ability to clean long sections of sewer drains, remove solid objects such as tree roots and jewelry, and their ready availability at hardware stores and tool rental counters. Machines using springs can easily negotiate multiple 90-degree bends while maintaining their effectiveness and without damaging the pipe.

Disadvantages of electric drain cleaners include their relatively high cost and weight, and the considerable physical effort required to control the cable.

Safety considerations for electric drain cleaners include wearing work gloves and eye protection, carefully controlling the cable during operation to avoid overstressing it, exercising appropriate caution when working around rotating machinery, and using properly grounded electrical outlets.

== Sewer jetters ==
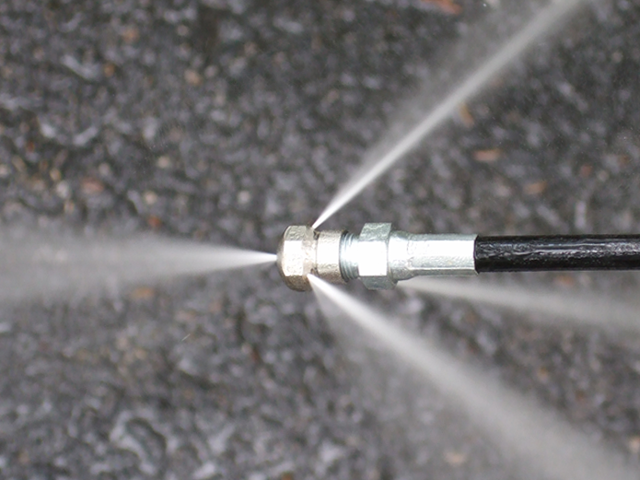
Pressure washer sewer jetter attachment, nozzle end

Pressure washer sewer jetter nozzle

Sewer jetting is the shooting of high-powered streams of water through the drain and down into the sewer to blast away debris blocking the flow of water. This is more effective than using a snake, blades, or even drain rods because, first, the water is shot at such a high intensity that the force isn't even comparable to manual labor, secondly, the water is much more capable of bending around curved or angular pipes to reach all the tight spots.

A sewer jetter is composed of a controlled high-pressure water source such as a pressure washer or reciprocating displacement pump, a flexible high-pressure line (called a jetter hose, which connects the high-pressure engine to the mini-reel) of up to hundreds of metres (several hundred feet) in length, the Mini-Reel (a hose reel which can be taken a distance from the engine) and a nozzle that uses hydraulic force to pull the line into sewer drains, clean the sides of pipes, and flush out residue. High-pressure sewer jetters can be mounted on trolleys, inside vans, or on trailers. The power of a sewer jetter ranges from 1,000 psi (68 atm) to 5,000 psi (340 atm).

Sewer jetter nozzles come in different sizes and applications; a bullet-type nozzle with a streamlined profile can clear a hole for a larger root-cutting nozzle. Root-cutter nozzles cut roots with a spinning nozzle that shoots a jet stream horizontally inside the pipe. High-pressure sewer jetters with root-cutting nozzles can clear a hole through the center of a root-infested sewer line and, with their rear-facing jet streams, cut the roots and clean the pipe walls, flushing the root debris through the sewer line. The sewer jetter has been labeled as a technological advancement of the plumber's snake (also known as an electric eel) drain-clearing method.

Portable sewer jetters and pressure-washer sewer-jetter attachments are primarily used by service personnel and homeowners to remove soft obstructions along a building's sewer drain and to prevent clog recurrence by cleaning the sides of drain pipes and flushing out residue. Pressure washer sewer jetter attachments are generally lower in cost and weight than electric drain cleaners with equivalent reach, and pose a lower risk of scratching plumbing fixtures.

Truck and trailer-mounted sewer jetters used by municipalities and larger service companies benefit from the high hydraulic horsepower delivered by powerful displacement pumps, and so can remove tree roots and other solid obstructions.

Advantages of sewer jetters include the relative ease of penetrating long sewer lines and the ability to remove residue that accumulates along the sides of sewer pipes, reducing the need for subsequent drain cleaning.

Disadvantages of pressure washer sewer jetter attachments and many portable jetters include an inability to extract tree roots and other hard obstructions. Disadvantages of truck- and trailer-mounted sewer jetters include their high relative cost and weight, as well as the need for extensive training to comply with manufacturers' safety guidelines.

Safety considerations for sewer jetters include wearing protective gloves and eye protection to avoid contact with sewer drain fluids, and ensuring that the jetter nozzle operates only inside the sewer pipe. Larger truck- and trailer-mounted units that operate with sufficient power to cut tree roots require extensive training and strict adherence to manufacturers' safety guidelines to avoid serious injury.
