= Ester hydrolysis =

Organic reaction

Ester hydrolysis is an organic reaction which hydrolyzes an ester to a carboxylic acid or carboxylate, and an alcohol. It can be performed with acid as catalyst, or with base as reagent.

== Acidic hydrolysis of esters ==
The mechanism of acid-catalyzed hydrolysis of esters is the reverse of Fischer esterification. Acid is only required in catalytic amounts, as in Fischer esterification, and an excess of water drives the equilibrium towards carboxylic acid and alcohol.

== Alkaline hydrolysis of esters ==
Alkaline hydrolysis of esters is also known as saponification. A base such as sodium hydroxide is required in stochiometric amounts. Unlike acid-catalyzed ester hydrolysis, it is not an equilibrium reaction and proceeds to completion. Hydroxide ion attacks the carbonyl carbon to give a tetrahedral intermediate, which then expels an alkoxide ion. The resulting carboxylic acid quickly protonates the alkoxide ion to give a carboxylate ion and an alcohol. Water is often used as a solvent, but the presence of water is not necessary; alcohols may also be used as solvents, with dissolved hydroxide ion performing hydrolysis.

In this example of alkaline hydrolysis of ethyl propionate, the asterisk indicates an oxygen-18 atom in an isotope labeling experiment to investigate the mechanism:

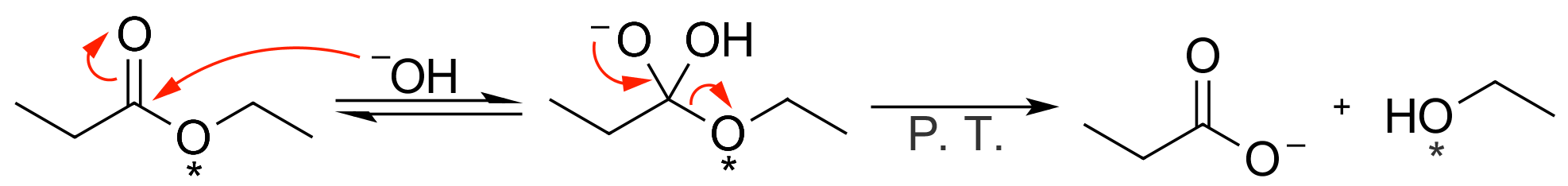
