= Kutsinta =

Filipino steam rice cake

Cuchinta
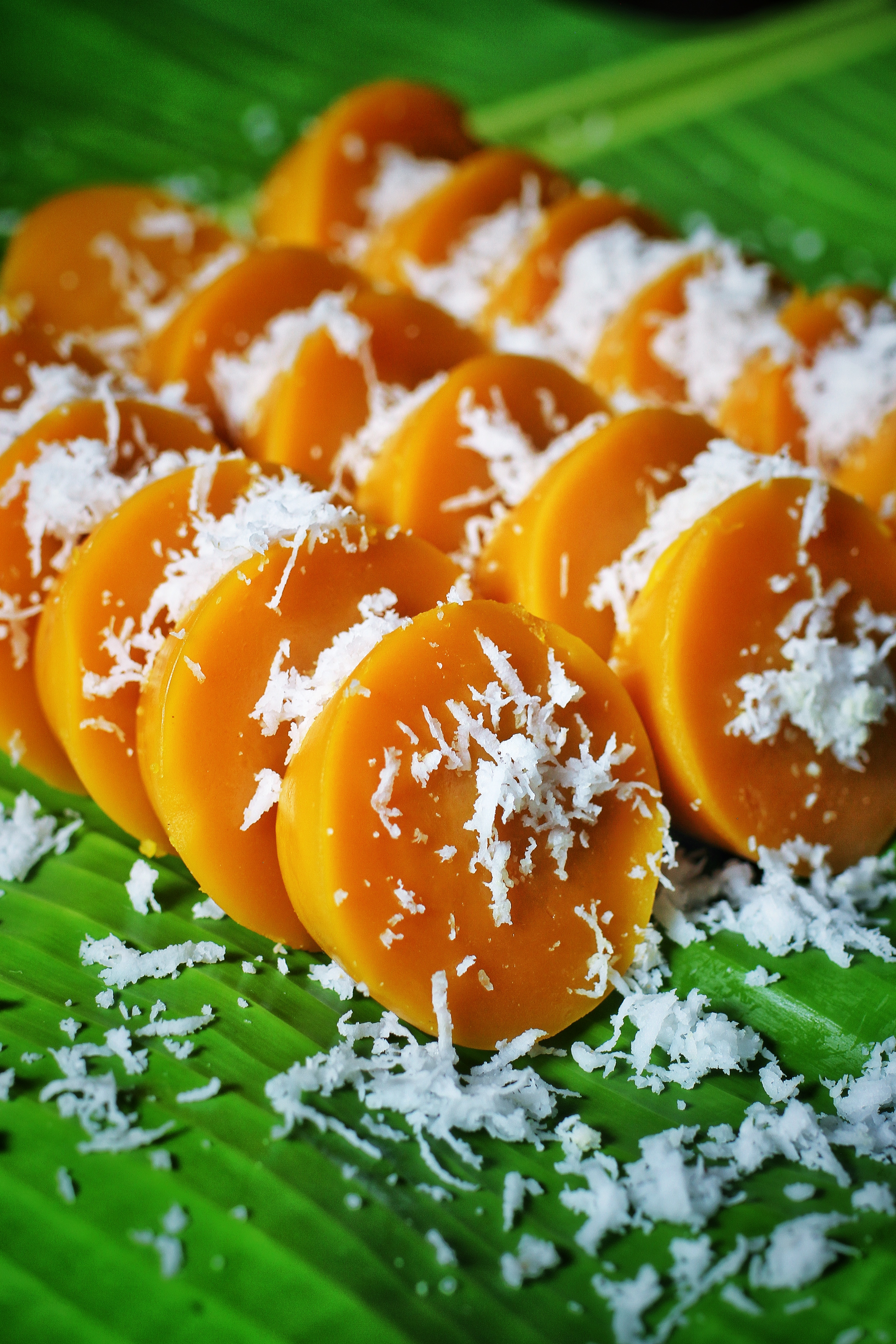
- Alternative names: Cuchinta, kutsinta, kuchinta, kutchinta
- Type: Rice cake
- Course: Dessert, merienda, or snack
- Place of origin: The Philippines
- Serving temperature: Room temperature
- Main ingredients: Tapioca or Rice flour, brown sugar, lye, grated coconut meat
- Similar dishes: Mont kywe the, Kuih kosui

Puto cuchinta or kutsinta, is a type of steamed rice cake (puto) found throughout the Philippines. It is made from a mixture of tapioca or rice flour, brown sugar, and lye, enhanced with yellow food coloring or annatto extract, and steamed in small ramekins. It bears resemblance to the Burmese mont kywe the and Indonesian and Malaysian kuih kosui.

The cooked cakes are traditionally topped with fresh grated meat from mature coconut. It is consumed year-round as a merienda or snack, and is frequently sold along with puto. Unlike its counterpart, which has a doughy texture, kutsinta has a jelly-like, chewy consistency. It has a very mild sweetness. It may be further sweetened by adding latik (coconut syrup) or a yema (sweet custard) dip.

== See also ==
- Maja blanca
- Putli mandi
- Puto
- Puto Calasiao
- Philippine cuisine
- List of steamed foods
- Kuih kosui
- Ang ku kueh
