= John Taylor (oculist) =

British eye surgeon and medical charlatan

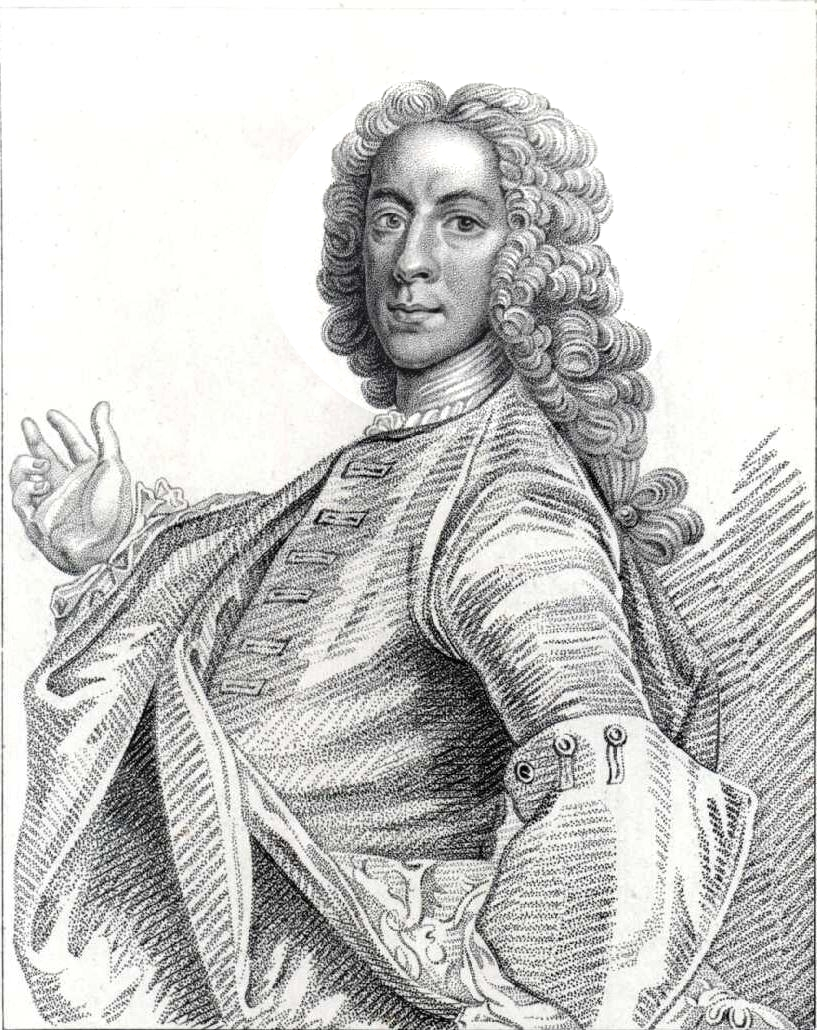
- Engraved portrait, dated to first half of 18th century
- Born: c. 1703; Norwich, England
- Died: 1770 or 1772
- Occupations: Charlatan, surgeon
- Relatives: John Taylor (grandson)

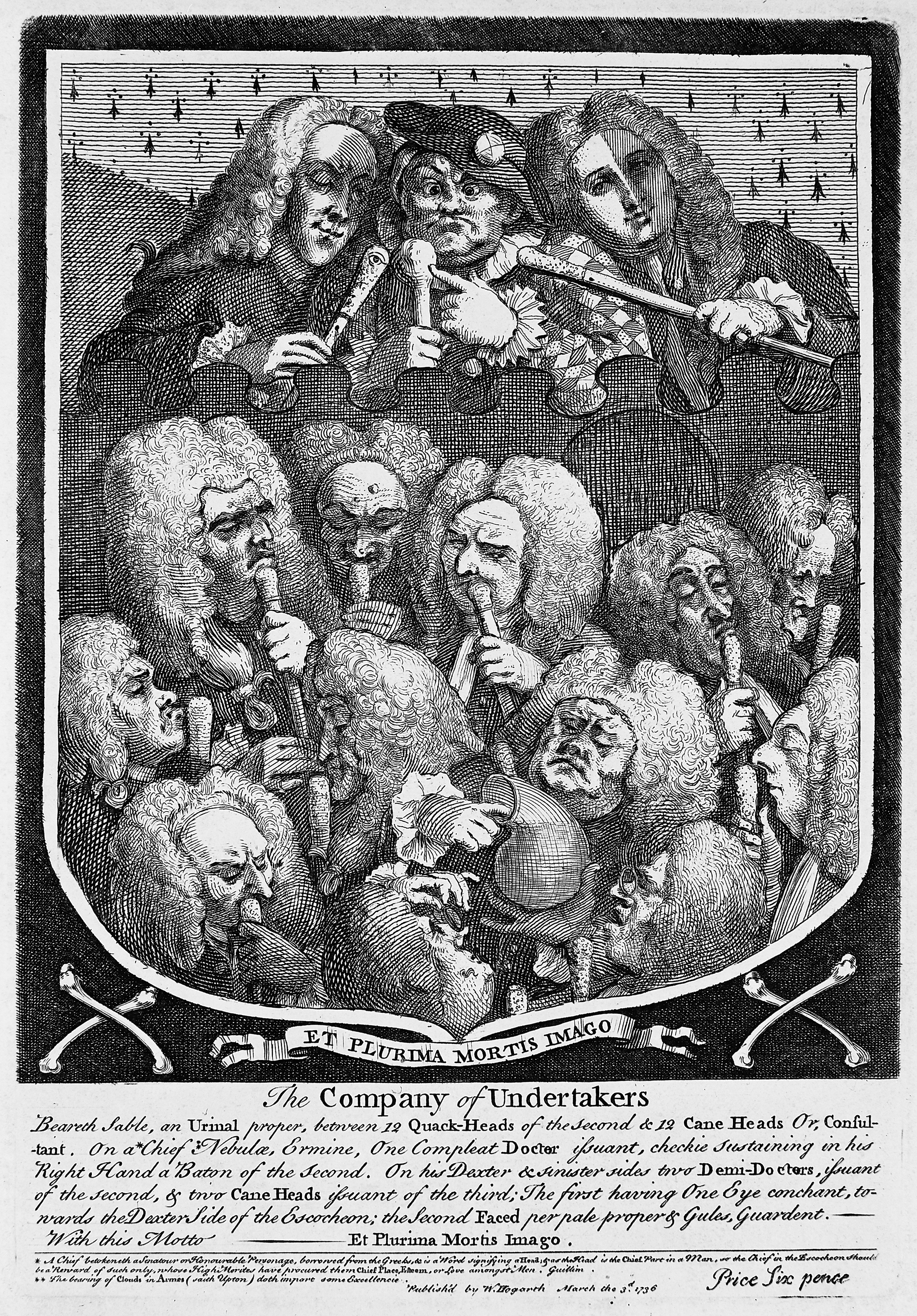
Taylor, depicted at upper left, in William Hogarth's 1736 print The Company of Undertakers (A Consultation of Quacks)

John Taylor (c. 1703 – 1770 or 1772) was an early British eye surgeon, self-promoter and medical charlatan of 18th-century Europe. He was responsible for the surgical mistreatment of George Frideric Handel, Johann Sebastian Bach, and perhaps hundreds of others. Both Handel and Bach died shortly after the botched surgery performed by Taylor.

== Career ==
Taylor was born in Norwich, possibly in 1703. He was the son of a surgeon named John Taylor, who died in 1709. He studied in London under the pioneering British surgeon William Cheselden at St Thomas' Hospital, and by 1727 had produced a book, An Account of the Mechanism of the Eye, dedicated to Cheselden.

While his practice grew, operating on celebrities of the time such as Edward Gibbon, making the acquaintance of Viennese courtier and patron of composers Gottfried van Swieten, and being appointed royal eye surgeon to King George II, his flair for self-promotion grew with it, then beyond it. Taylor later claimed that during his visit to Marseille in 1734 he stimulated Jacques Daviel (the initiator of cataract extraction as opposed to couching) to pursue ophthalmic practice, which seems to be supported by contemporaneous evidence. Taylor dubbed himself "Chevalier", though the source of his title (equivalent to "knight" in English) is questionable, and his claims to be from an aristocratic family were false. Taylor was not ennobled until 1755, by Pope Benedict XIV. Taylor toured Europe in a coach painted with images of eyes, performing the ancient technique of couching cataracts and other techniques in something like an eye surgery travelling medicine show, with claims, treatments, and payments coordinated for an easy exit out of town. In his expansive 1761 autobiography in two volumes, The Life and Extraordinary History of the Chevalier John Taylor, Taylor styled himself "Ophthalmiater (sic) Pontifical, Imperial, Royal."

Taylor's career was destructive. His general approach included bloodletting, laxatives, and eyedrops of blood from slaughtered pigeons, pulverized sugar, or baked salt. In late March 1750, during one of his European tours, Taylor operated on Bach's cataracts twice in Leipzig and reportedly blinded him. Bach fell ill with a fever and died less than four months later. There is some evidence that Taylor operated on Handel in August 1758, in Tunbridge Wells, after which Handel's health deteriorated until his death in April 1759. In both cases Taylor claimed complete success. Prior to performing each surgical procedure, he would deliver a long, self-promoting speech in an unusual oratorial style. Dutch ophthalmologist R. Zegers mentions that "after his training, Taylor started practicing in Switzerland, where he blinded hundreds of patients, he once confessed". Writer Samuel Johnson said of Taylor that his life showed "an instance of how far impudence may carry ignorance."

The time and place of Taylor's death are uncertain. The musicologist Charles Burney claimed that he died on the morning of Friday 16 November 1770 in Rome, also claiming to have "dined with him at my table d'hote a few days before his death". He was also said to have died in Paris. In June and July 1772, newspapers in Germany and England reported that he recently died at a convent in Prague, completely blind, after having suffered from amaurosis. This version of the story was supported by Taylor's grandson John Taylor.

== See also ==
- William Read
- Joshua Ward
