= Gabriel Roberts =

British Member of Parliament and official of the East India Company

Gabriel Roberts (c. 1665–c.1744) of Ampthill, Bedfordshire, was an official of the East India Company and politician who sat in the House of Commons between 1713 and 1734.

Roberts was the second son of William Roberts, vintner, of St. Katherine Cree, London, and his wife Martha Dashwood, daughter of Francis Dashwood, merchant and alderman of London.

In 1678, he inherited a third part of his father's estate, and in 1683 he joined the East India Company as a writer. He spent six years at Fort St. George, India, where he married Elizabeth Proby, daughter of Charles Proby on 25 August 1687. He was Receiver of sea customs at Fort St. George from 1688 to 1689. He returned to London and became a member of the Levant Company in 1691 and was assistant at the Royal African Company from 1695 to 1701. In 1696 he was a commissioner taking subscriptions to land bank. He served with his uncles, Sir Samuel Dashwood and Sir Francis Dashwood, 1st Baronet on the committee of the Old East India Company from 1698 to 1701. In 1701, he was sent back to India and in 1702 took became second of council at Fort St George under Thomas Pitt. He was deputy-governor of Fort St. David, Madras from 1702 to 1703 and from 1704 to 1709. He resigned his place when Pitt left in 1709, but remained in India until 1711.

On his return to England, Roberts acquired a property at Ampthill, Bedfordshire from the Bruce family. He was returned unopposed as Member of Parliament for Marlborough, on the Bruce interest at the 1713 general election. He was inactive in Parliament and was classed as a Tory, although he had many dissenting connections.

Roberts lost his seat at the 1715 general election but was seated on petition on 13 May 1717. He supported the Government, voting for the repeal of the Occasional Conformity and Schism Acts and the Peerage Bill. He was re-elected in a contest at Marlborough at the 1722 general election. In 1724, he became a director of the South Sea Company. He changed seats to Chippenham at the 1727 general election, when he was returned unopposed. He voted with the Opposition on the arrears of the civil list in 1729, but from then on with the Government.

Roberts married as his second wife, Mary Wenman, daughter of Sir Francis Wenman, 1st Baronet of Caswell House, Curbridge, Oxfordshire on 24 February 1690. He ended his term as a director of the South Sea Company in 1733 and did not stand at the 1734 general election. At his death in 1744, he left an only son Philip by his second wife. This son, Major Philip Roberts, married Anne Coke, daughter of Edward Coke and took the name of Coke in place of his patronymic in 1750. He was the father of Wenman Coke, MP and ancestor of the earls of Leicester.

Parliament of Great Britain
Preceded by Richard Jones; Hon. Robert Bruce	Member of Parliament for Marlborough; 1713–1715; With: Hon. Robert Bruce	Succeeded by Sir William Humphreys; Joshua Ward
Preceded by Sir William Humphreys; Joshua Ward	Member of Parliament for Marlborough; 1717–1727; With: Sir William Humphreys 1717-1722; Earl of Hertford 1722; Thomas Gibson 1722-1727	Succeeded by Thomas Gibson; Edward Lisle 1727
Preceded by Sir John Eyles; Thomas Boucher	Member of Parliament for Chippenham; 1727–1734; With: Rogers Holland	Succeeded by Rogers Holland; Richard Long
