= The Company of Undertakers =

1736 engraving by William Hogarth

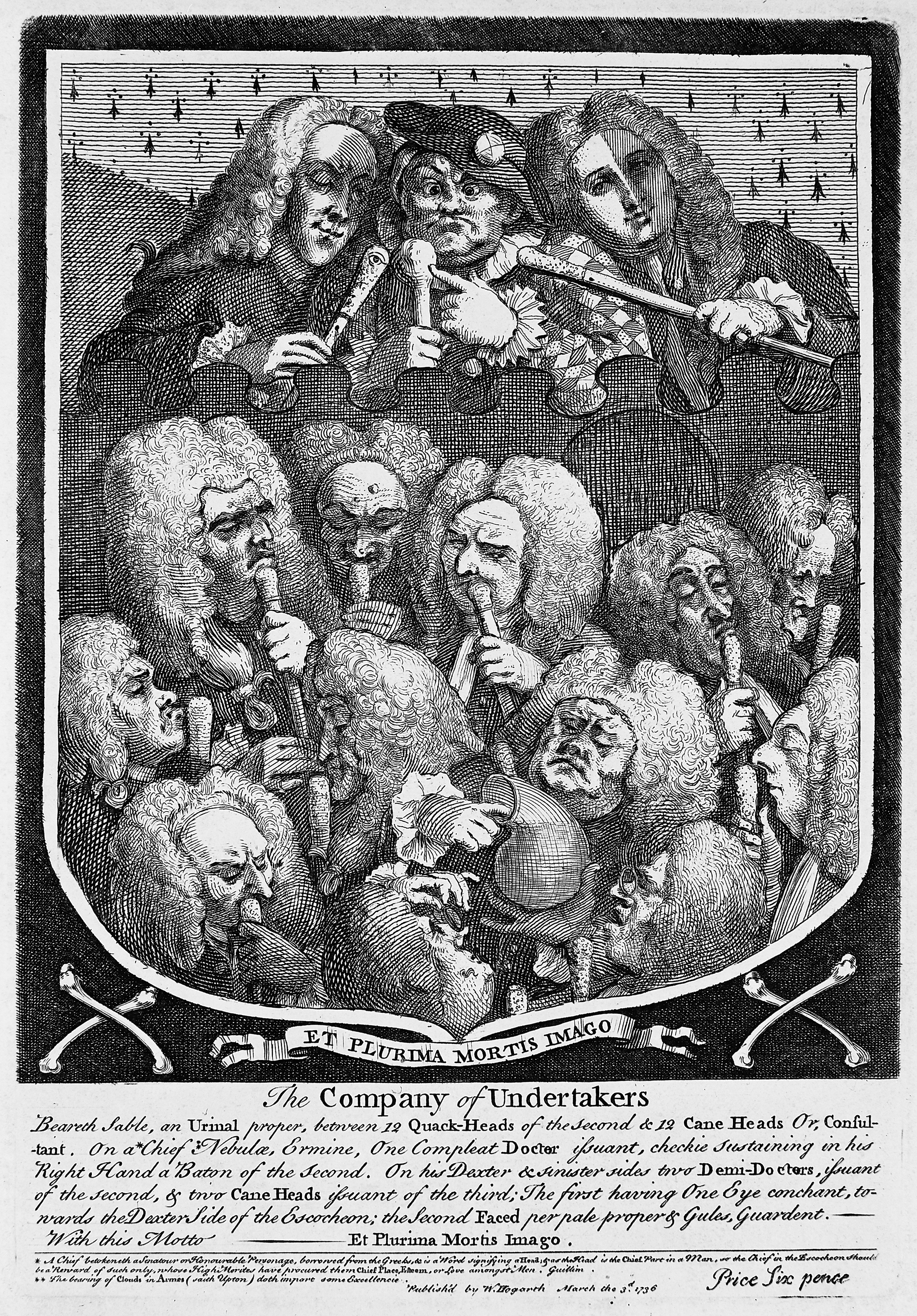
A Consultation of Physicians, or The Company of Undertakers by William Hogarth (1736). Scan from the Wellcome Collection.

A Consultation of Physicians, or The Company of Undertakers is a 1736 engraving by the English artist William Hogarth that satirizes the medical profession. It depicts a coat of arms with three notorious quacks of the time―John Taylor, Sarah Mapp, and Joshua Ward—seated at the top of the shield and twelve physicians below, implying that the quacks and the physicians are one and the same. The blazon at the bottom of the print reads:

The company of undertakers beareth, sable, a urinal, proper, between twelve quack-heads of the second, and twelve cane-heads, or consultant. On a chief, nebulae, ermine, one complete doctor, issuant, checkie, sustaining, in his right hand, a baton of the second. On his dexter and sinister sides two demi-doctors, issuant, of the second, and two cane-heads, issuant of the third; the first having one eye, couchant, towards the dexter side of the escutcheon; the second, faced, per pale, proper, and gules guardant. With this motto—Et plurima mortis imago.

Taylor, seated at the top left, is winking and holds a cane bearing an open eye, a reference to his dubious ocular surgeries. The bonesetter Mapp holds a large bone in her hand, and Ward, a pharmaceutical charlatan, is depicted with a half-red face, representing the man's distinctive port-wine birthmark. A physician in the bottom right holds a urine flask, likely referencing the practice of uroscopy. Other physicians examine the flask, holding perfumed canes to their noses to cover up the smell—perhaps of death. The motto translates to "And many are the faces of death" or "Everywhere the image of death". The doctors' canes resemble the batons held by undertakers at funerals, and death is symbolized by the black background and the crossed bones at the bottom of the crest. The language of "quack-heads" and "cane-heads" equates the intellect of the doctors to that of their canes.

== See also ==
- List of works by William Hogarth
