= Sulfuric acid poisoning =

- Specialty: Toxicology

Sulfuric acid poisoning refers to ingestion of sulfuric acid, found in lead-acid batteries and some metal cleaners, pool cleaners, drain cleaners and anti-rust products.

== Signs and symptoms ==
- Brown to black streak from angle of mouth
- Brown to black vomitus
- Brown to black stomach wall
- Black swollen tongue
- White (chalky white) teeth
- Blotting paper appearance of stomach mucosa
- Ulceration of esophagus (fibrosis and stricture)
- Perforation of stomach.
- The stomach resembles a black spongy mass on post mortem

== Treatment ==
For superficial injuries, washing (therapeutic irrigation) is important. Emergency treatments include protecting the airway, which might involve a tracheostomy. Further treatment will vary depending on the severity, but might include investigations to determine the extent of damage (bronchoscopy for the airways and endoscopy for the gastrointestinal tract), followed by treatments including surgery (to debride and repair) and intravenous fluids.

Gastric lavage is contraindicated in corrosive acid poisoning like sulfuric acid poisoning. Bicarbonate is also contraindicated as it liberates carbon dioxide which can cause gastric dilatation leading to rupture of stomach, leading to severe abdominal damage or death.

== See also ==
- Acid attack
