= Rogers Holland =

Rogers Holland (c.1701 – 17 July 1761) of Chippenham, Wiltshire was an English lawyer and Whig politician who sat in the House of Commons from 1727 to 1737.

Holland was the eldest son of John Holland of Chippenham and his wife Dorothy Rogers who was daughter, or possibly granddaughter of Jonathan Rogers of Chippenham. He was admitted at Gray's Inn in 1720 and was called to the bar in 1724 ‘at the request of’ Sir Robert Raymond, then justice of the King's bench. He succeeded his father in 1723.

Holland was returned unopposed as Member of Parliament for Chippenham at the 1727 British general election. He voted with the Administration in all known occasions, except when he opposed the Excise Bill. He served on the gaols committee for a time. In 1732 he became a trustee and councilman, in the original charter list, for the newly formed colony of Georgia on the east coast of America. He was elected MP for Chippenham in a hard contest at the 1734 British general election. In 1737 he was appointed Chief Justice of Anglesey, Caernarvonshire and Merioneth and had to stand for re-election in June 1737. He was defeated at the by-election by Edward Bayntun-Rolt. He did not stand for Parliament again. However he remained involved in politics at Chippenham as a member of the corporation.

Holland married Mary Mayo the daughter of William Mayo of Hope-under-Dinmore, Herefordshire, on 1 March 1731. She died on 27 March 1733 and he made a second marriage on 14 February 1735 to Mildred Martin, a widow. He remained a judge for the rest of his life.

Holland died on 17 July 1761, leaving one son by his first wife.

Parliament of Great Britain
Preceded by Sir John Eyles, Bt; Thomas Boucher	Member of Parliament for Chippenham; 1727–1737; With: Gabriel Roberts 1727–1734; Richard Long 1734–1737	Succeeded by Edward Bayntun-Rolt; Richard Long
