= Francis Seymour, of Sherborne, Dorset =

Francis Seymour (1697 – 23 December 1761), of Sherborne House, Dorset, was a British landowner and Tory politician, who sat in the House of Commons from 1732 to 1741.

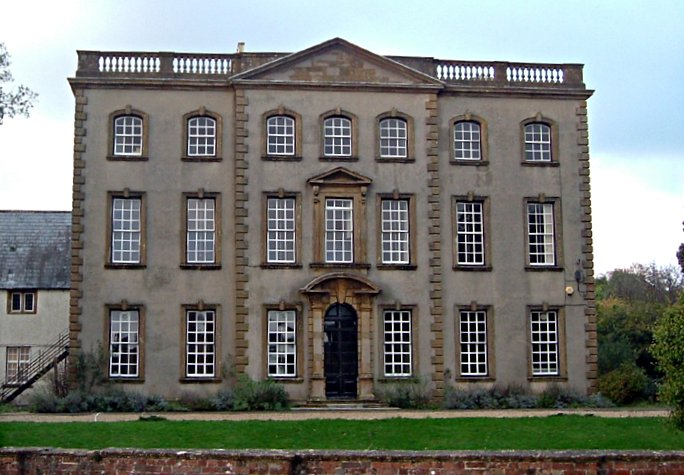
Sherborne House, Dorset

Seymour was the second son of Sir Edward Seymour, 5th Baronet and his wife Letitia Popham. In 1728, he succeeded to the estates of his paternal great-uncle Henry Seymour Portman MP, which included Sherborne House. He married on 30 July 1728 his cousin Elizabeth Popham, Dowager Lady Hinchingbrooke (died 20 March 1761), daughter of Alexander Popham, of Littlecote, Wiltshire, MP, and great-granddaughter of Colonel Alexander Popham.

Seymour was returned as Tory Member of Parliament for Great Bedwyn at a by-election on 29 April 1732. At the 1734 British general election he was elected in a contest as MP for Marlborough on the Bruce interest. He did not stand again in 1741. On all recorded occasions, he voted against the Administration of Walpole.

Seymour died on 23 December 1761, leaving two children:

- Mary Seymour, who married John Baily in 1758
- Henry Seymour, of Redland Court, Gloucestershire (1729–1807)

Parliament of Great Britain
| Preceded by Sir William Willys; William Sloper | Member of Parliament for Great Bedwyn; 1732–1734; With: William Sloper | Succeeded by William Sloper; Robert Murray |
| Preceded by Thomas Gibson; Edward Lisle | Member of Parliament for Marlborough; 1734–1741; With: Edward Lisle 1734–1737; John Crawley 1737–1741 | Succeeded by John Crawley; Sir John Hynde Cotton |
