= William Humfreys =

British Member of Parliament and Lord Mayor of London

Sir William Humfreys, 1st Baronet (also spelled Humphreys; died 26 October 1735), was a British ironmonger and politician who sat in the House of Commons from 1715 to 1722. He was Lord Mayor of London for 1714–15 and a Director of the Bank of England between 1719 and 1730.

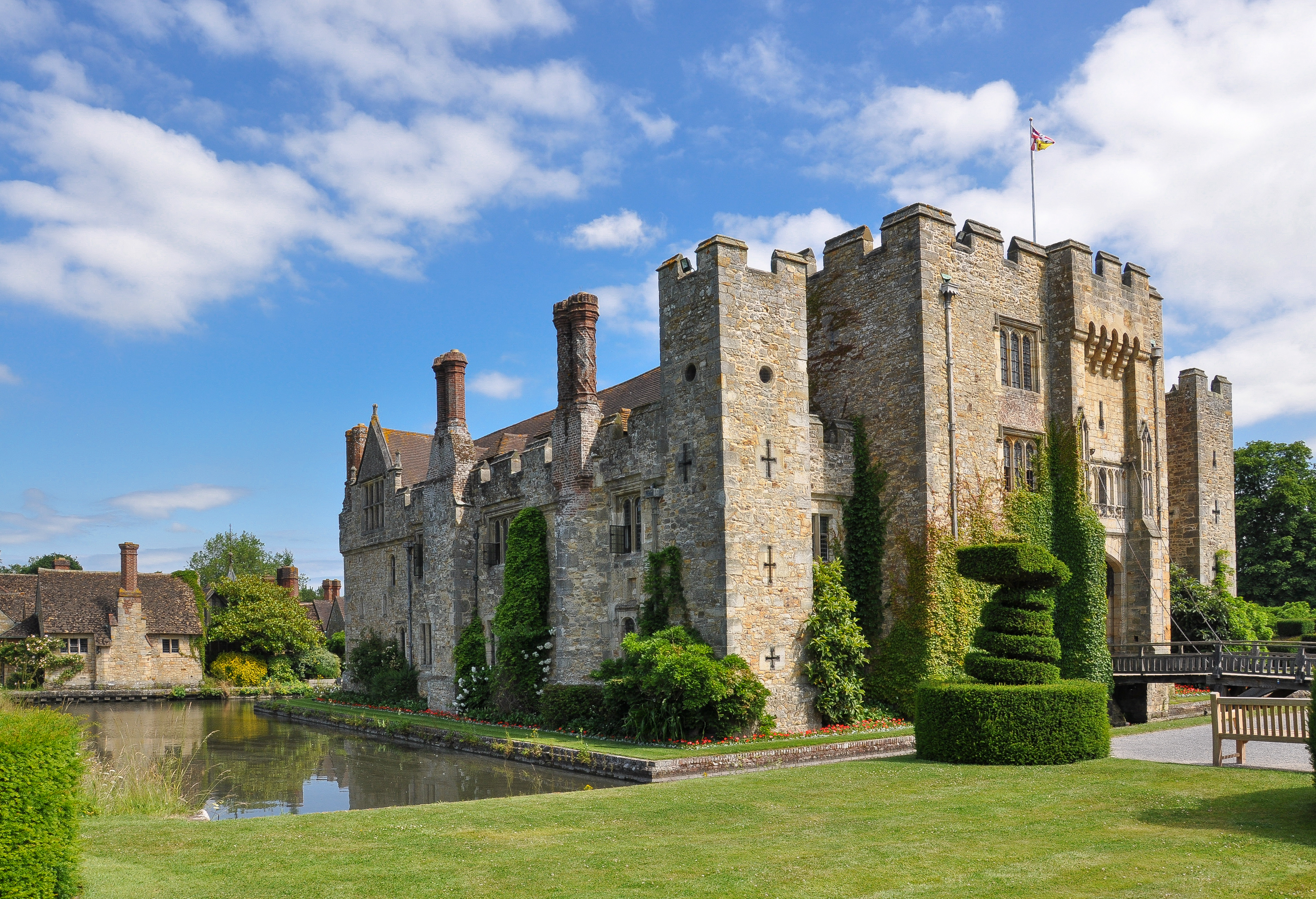
Hever Castle, Kent

He was the only son of ironmonger Nathaniel Humfreys of Candlewick Street, London. His father was the second son of William Ap Humfrey, of Penrhyn, Montgomeryshire. He followed his father into the ironmongery trade of London, and was Master of the Worshipful Company of Ironmongers in 1705. He became an oilman and drysalter in Poultry, London, living afterwards in Bloomsbury Square.

Humfreys was Sheriff of London, 1704–05, and was knighted on 26 October 1704. He was Alderman of Cheap ward from 29 July 1707, and of Bridge Without from 25 January 1733 until his death. From 1711 to 1715, he was a Director of the East India Company. He was Lord Mayor of London for 1714–15, and in that capacity officiated on 20 October 1714 at the Coronation of the British monarch, George I of Great Britain, entertaining the King and his court at Guildhall, London. He was created a baronet in the baronetage of Great Britain on 30 November 1714.

He was Member of Parliament in the Parliament of Great Britain for Marlborough from 1715 to 1722. and a Director of the Bank of England in 1719–21, 1722–25, 1726–27 and 1728–30. He was President of Bridewell and Bethlehem Hospitals, Lord of the manors of Barking and Dagenham.

== Private life ==
He married firstly Margaret Wintour, daughter of William Wintour of Dymock, Gloucestershire with whom he had a son, Orlando. She died on 19 August 1704, and was buried at St Mildred, Poultry. He married secondly, on 6 January 1705 at Knightsbridge Chapel, Ellen, the widow of Col. Robert Lancashire of London. He had no issue by his second wife, who died on 25 March 1732.

In 1715 Humfreys bought Hever Castle in Kent from James Waldegrave, 1st Earl Waldegrave.

He died on 26 October 1735, and was buried on 6 November 1735 at St Mildred, Poultry. He was succeeded by his only son, Orlando, who married Ellen Lancashire, his stepmother's daughter by her first husband. Orlando died without surviving male issue on 14 June 1737, his only son (Robert) having died a few months before on 17 January; the baronetcy thus became extinct. His widow died on 3 April 1745. In the complicated family circumstances Hever Castle was sold in 1749 to Timothy Waldo.

Parliament of Great Britain
Preceded by Gabriel Roberts; Robert Bruce	Member of Parliament for Marlborough; 1715–1722; With: Joshua Ward to 1717; Gabriel Roberts from 1717	Succeeded by Gabriel Roberts; Earl of Hertford
Civic offices
Preceded by Sir Samuel Stanier	Lord Mayor of London; 1714–1715	Succeeded by Sir Charles Peers
Baronetage of Great Britain
New title	Baronet (of London); 1714–1735	Succeeded by Orlando Humphreys
