= John Taylor (journalist) =

18th/19th-century English oculist, drama critic, editor and newspaper publisher

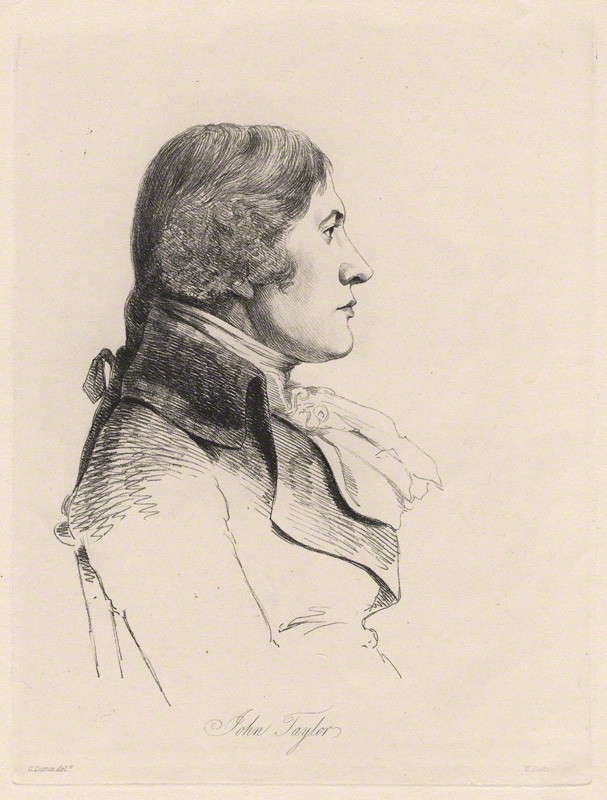
- Drawing by William Daniell
- Born: 1757
- Died: 1832 (aged 74–75)
- Occupation(s): Oculist, drama critic, editor, newspaper publisher
- Known for: Records of My Life
- Relatives: John Taylor (grandfather)

John Taylor (1757–1832) was an English oculist, drama critic, editor and finally newspaper publisher, perhaps most famous for his posthumous memoir Records of My Life.

== Biography ==
Taylor was educated by a Dr. Crawford in Hatton Garden before attending a school at Ponders End, Middlesex.

Grandson of the King's oculist, also named John Taylor, the younger Taylor was appointed oculist in his turn, along with his brother, during the reign of George III. He later wrote drama criticism for The Morning Post, eventually becoming its editor. His last career change was to publishing, when he bought the True Briton, and then The Sun, a deeply Tory newspaper, in 1813.
