= Thomas Gibson (banker) =

English banker and politician (1667-1744)

- Born: 1667
- Died: 1744 (aged 76–77)
- Occupation: Politician

Thomas Gibson (16 March 1667 – 21 September 1744) was an English banker and politician. A younger son of gentry from the North Riding of Yorkshire, he made his career as a banker in London and held finance-related public offices for most of his life.

Gibson was the fifth son of John Gibson of Welburn in Yorkshire, whose ancestor Sir John Gibson had bought the manor of Welburn in 1597. Thomas Gibson became a partner in the banking firm of Gibson, Jacob, and Jacomb of Lothbury in London, where he financed coal mines in the north of England.

Gibson became surveyor of petty customs in London in 1708. Through the bank he developed a friendship with Robert Walpole, the Prime Minister from 1721 to 1742, who appointed him in 1714 as cashier to the pay office. Gibson held the office until his death.

Walpole brought Gibson into the House of Commons at the 1722 general election as a Member of Parliament (MP) for Marlborough. He held that seat until he stood down at the 1734 general election, but was brought in two years later at an uncontested by-election for Yarmouth. He held the seat until death on 21 September 1744, aged 67.

Parliament of Great Britain
Preceded by Earl of Hertford; Gabriel Roberts	Member of Parliament for Marlborough; October 1722 – 1734; With: Gabriel Roberts to 1727; Edward Lisle from 1727	Succeeded by Francis Seymour; Edward Lisle
Preceded by Paul Burrard; Lord Harry Powlett	Member of Parliament for Yarmouth, Isle of Wight; 1736–1744; With: Lord Harry Powlett to 1737; Anthony Chute 1737–41; Maurice Bocland from 1741	Succeeded by Robert Carteret; Maurice Bocland
