= Edward Lisle =

English Tory politician (1692–1753)

Edward Lisle (17 May 1692 – 1753), of Moyles Court, Hampshire, was an English landowner and Tory politician, who sat in the House of Commons between 1727 and 1741. He fled to France to escape a creditor, before the end of his parliamentary term.

== Family ==
Lisle was the eldest son of Edward Lisle, barrister of Crux Easton and Moyles Court, and his wife Mary Phillipps, daughter of Sir Ambrose Phillipps of Garendon, Leicestershire. He was admitted at Middle Temple in 1710, and matriculated at Magdalen College, Oxford on 24 March 1711, aged 18. He succeeded his father in 1722. On 8 November 1726, he married Mrs Bush, a widow with "£60,000 and upwards", who was a daughter of John Carter of Weston Colville, Cambridgeshire.

== Parliament ==
Lisle was returned as a Tory Member of Parliament for Marlborough on the Bruce interest at the 1727 British general election. In Parliament he voted against the administration in all recorded divisions. He was returned for Marlborough again at the 1734 British general election and was also returned for Hampshire, where he held estates. There was a petition against his return for Hampshire, which was not resolved until 1737, when he chose to sit there instead of Marlborough. His only reported speeches were on 26 February 1735, when he supported the appointment of a committee to enquire into the postmaster general's power to open letters, and on 21 January 1736 relating to the petition at Hampshire.

== Flight ==
In the autumn of 1739 a bill was presented in the Court of Chancery by Caecilius Calvert, who claimed Lisle's estates on the ground that he had not been paid an annuity of £400, which was charged on them. Lisle fled to Montpellier, in France, telling his servants that he did not know if he would ever return to Britain. Calvert could not proceed with his bill because of Lisle's parliamentary privilege, and on 28 February 1740 he petitioned the House on the matter. Lisle was ordered to attend on 13 March 1740. He did not appear and so his parliamentary privilege was suspended until he did attend. He did not attend again and did not stand at the 1741 British general election.

Lisle died without issue on 15 June 1753. Moyles Court passed to his brothers in succession.

Parliament of Great Britain
Preceded by Thomas Gibson; Gabriel Roberts	Member of Parliament for Marlborough; 1727–1737; With: Thomas Gibson 1727-1734; Francis Seymour 1734-1737	Succeeded by Francis Seymour; John Crawley
Preceded by Lord Harry Powlett; Sir John Cope, Bt	Member of Parliament for Hampshire; 1734–1741; With: Lord Harry Powlett	Succeeded by Lord Harry Powlett; Paulet St John
