= Humphreys baronets =

Extinct baronetcy in the Baronetage of Great Britain

Escutcheon of the Humphreys baronets

The Humphreys or Humfreys Baronetcy, of London, was a title in the Baronetage of Great Britain. It was created on 30 November 1714 for William Humphreys, Lord Mayor of London and later Member of Parliament for Marlborough.

The title became extinct on the death of his only son, the 2nd Baronet, in 1737.

== Humphreys baronets, of London (1714) ==
- Sir William Humphreys, 1st Baronet (died 1735)
- Sir Orlando Humphreys, 2nd Baronet (died 1737)

Baronetage of Great Britain
Preceded by Austen baronets	Humphreys baronets of London; 30 November 1714	Succeeded by Eyles baronets
