= Samuel Stanier =

Sir Samuel Stanier (1649 – 28 August 1724) of Wanstead, Essex, was a London merchant who became Lord Mayor of London in 1713

Stanier was the eldest son of James Stanier of St. Mary Axe, London, and his wife Thomasine Meade. His father was a merchant, trading with Italy, who died in 1666. In 1673, Stanier inherited from his uncle, Robert Stanier, houses and lands in Bethnal Green and lands in the parish of Hackney.

He was also a considerable investor in the transatlantic slave trade and was duty-governor of the Royal African Company of England for the RAC between 1693 and 1694. Also an assistant (director) in the Royal African Company 1686–1688, 1691–1692, 1695–1699, 1702–1706, 1780. He had part-ownership in many RAC Guineamen, trading in enslaved Africans with the Hannibal slave ship being just one example.

Stanier became a merchant of Bishopsgate and was a member of the Drapers Company. He was a common councillor for Aldgate from 1698 to 1705; and was elected an alderman of Aldgate on 27 September 1705. He was Sheriff of London from 1705 to 1706 and was knighted on 18 December 1705. He was also Master of the Drapers Company for the year 1705 to 1706. From 1707 to 1710 he was Colonel of the Red Regiment of the City Militia. He stood for Parliament for City of London at the 1708 general election but was unsuccessful. In 1713 he became Lord Mayor of London. Subsequently, he was Colonel of the Red Regiment for the rest of his life.

Stanier died on 28 August 1724.

Civic offices
Preceded by Sir Richard Hoare	Lord Mayor of London; 1713–1714	Succeeded by Sir William Humfreys, Bt
