= Charles Peers =

British businessman (1661–1737)

The Right Honourable Sir Charles Peers Kt
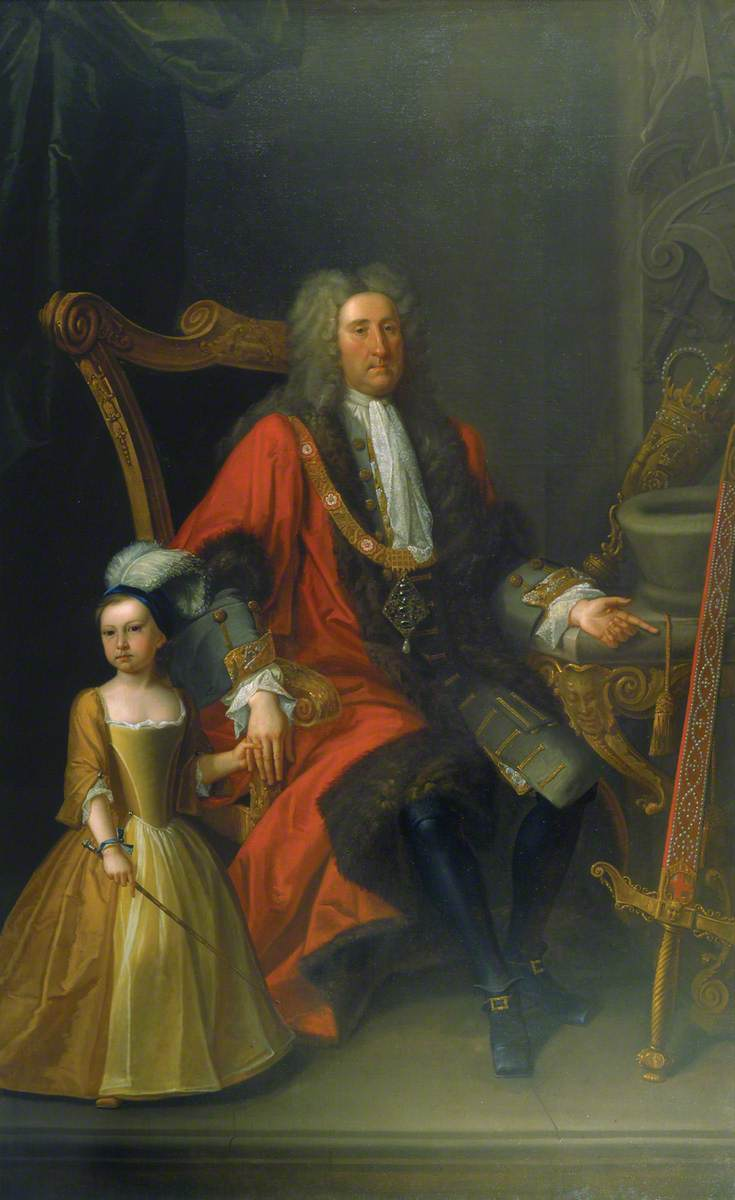
- Portrait of Sir Charles Peers

Lord Mayor of London
- In office 1715–1716
- Monarch: George I
- Preceded by: Sir William Humphreys
- Succeeded by: Sir James Bateman

Sheriff of the City of London
- In office 1708–1709

Alderman of Tower Ward
- In office 1708–1737

Common Councilman for Aldgate Ward
- In office 1701–1708

Master of the Worshipful Company of Salters
- In office 1716–1717

Chairman of the East India Company
- In office 1714–1715
- Succeeded by: Robert Child

Director of the Bank of England
- In office 1705–1707
- In office 1708–1712

Personal details
- Born: 1661 London, England
- Died: 1737 (aged 75–76) England
- Spouse(s): Sarah Bauds, Elizabeth Green, Lucy Beighton
- Children: 8
- Occupation: Merchant, Politician

Sir Charles Peers (1661 – 29 January 1737) was a British businessman who became the Chairman of the East India Company in 1714 and Lord Mayor of London in 1715. He had previously served as one of the Sheriffs of the City of London in 1708–1709.

== Biography ==
Peers was born to Edmund Peers (d. 1681) and Mary Walden, in 1661, of the parish of the St. Katherine Creechurch, Aldgate ward, London. Through his mother, he was a nephew of Sir Lionel Walden, who served as Mayor of Huntingdon. Peers was educated at St Paul’s School, London.

Peers was an active merchant trading between Málaga, London, and other European ports, operating both on his own account and as an agent for other merchants in England. In 1689 Peers married Sarah Baud, the niece of Lady Susanna Morden (née Brand), the wife of Sir John Morden, founder of Morden College. Through this union, Peers expanded his commercial interests, reportedly receiving a quarter share in an East Indiaman, the 'Velez Merchant' as part of Sarah's dowry.

Peers' trading accounts reveal voyages from Málaga to Amsterdam, Hamburg, Danzig, and transatlantic routes including Boston to Jamaica, with Bristol as his main English port. His trade involved commodities such as wine, sherry, fruit, oil, soap, nuts, indigo, hides, silk stockings, and clocks.

He started his career as a salter (trader of salt) and also as the London partner of William Morley and Company of Málaga, merchants and importers. He later became Common Councilman for Aldgate Ward 1701–8, and Alderman of Tower Ward 1708–37.

Peers served as Master of the Worshipful Company of Salters, one of the Great Twelve Livery Companies of the City of London in 1716-17.

He was a Director of the Bank of England in 1705-07 and 1708–12, a Director of the New East India Company in 1701-05 and 1706–09 and a Director of the United East India Company in 1712-15. He was Chairman of the latter for 1714-15.

He was knighted on 16 July 1707, by Queen Anne of Great Britain. He served as a Sheriff of the City of London (1708–1709) and as Lord Mayor of London (1715–16), of which he was granted a coat of arms reflecting his civic prominence.

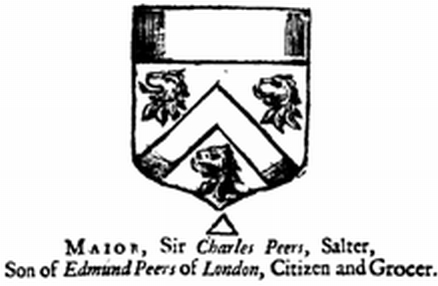
Coat of Arms of Sir Charles Peers

== See also ==
- List of Lord Mayors of London

Civic offices
Preceded by Sir William Humfreys, 1st Baronet	Lord Mayor of London; 1715–1716	Succeeded by Sir James Bateman
