= Tincture of benzoin =

Pungent solution of benzoin resin in ethanol

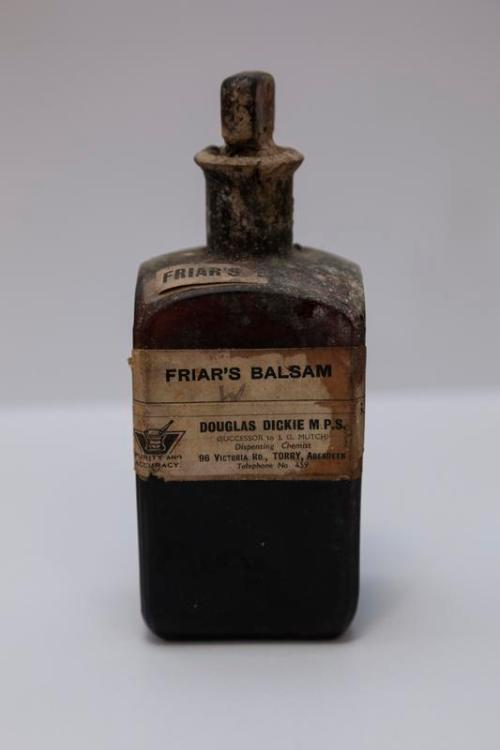
Friar's balsam from ship's medicine chest

Tincture of benzoin is a pungent solution of benzoin resin in ethanol. A similar preparation called friar's balsam or compound benzoin tincture contains, in addition, Cape aloes or Barbados aloes and storax resin. The U.S. Navy stated that compound tincture of benzoin was composed of the alcohol-soluble principles from benzoin, aloes, storax, and balsam of tolu. Friar's balsam was invented by the English doctor and MP Joshua Ward c. 1760.

== Use ==
Compound benzoin tincture is often applied to skin under an adhesive bandage. It protects the skin from allergy to the adhesive and makes the bandage adhere longer. It is also used by athletes for its reputation of toughening skin. Orthopedists often apply it under a cast, because it protects the skin and diminishes itching.

It is also an old remedy for congested sinuses and lungs. A few drops are placed on the surface of a bowl of hot water, over which one holds one's face and breathes the steam, preferably with a towel over one's head to keep the steam in.

It can be applied to skin fissures, canker sores and fever blisters as a styptic and antiseptic. It is thought that light turns the benzoin tincture in these modern containers to a darker color. The newly produced tincture is often quite clear until mixed and heated in a pot of water or left uncapped or exposed for an unspecified time, at which it turns to a maple syrup brown color. It is unknown if oxidation occurs to produce the dark color or the effects of UV light cause the colour change. The compounding of benzoin tincture with other substances, such as aloe and tolu balsam, is also thought to cause the variation of color.

The tincture of cenzoin is available in 60 mL dark amber glass bottles. This is the traditional way of packaging as opposed to the individual applicators currently made popular by 3M in hospitals with Steri-Strips: small clear glass ampules containing 0.6ml and plugged with a fluffed cotton bung.

It is issued and used in the U.S. military to treat blisters. A common treatment utilized by medics in the U.S. Army is to drain the fluid from a blister and then inject enough compound tincture of benzoin into the void to glue the blister to the underlying skin, to serve as a local antiseptic, and to prevent further abrasion or loss of skin. This is commonly known as a "hot shot" amongst military personnel due to the extreme burning sensation that will be experienced for several moments when the tincture is applied. Those who have undergone this treatment do not find the blisters to cause any irritation subsequently, causes for which could either be somatic or psychological as the medicinal properties have not been studied.

The U.S.N. Hospital Corps listed uses include steam atomizer in the treatment of corpus afflictions of the throat and bronchi, protection of ulcers, fissures of the lips and anus, bedsores, etc.

Both compounds are also used in cosmetics.
