= William Read (oculist) =

Scottish eye doctor and charlatan

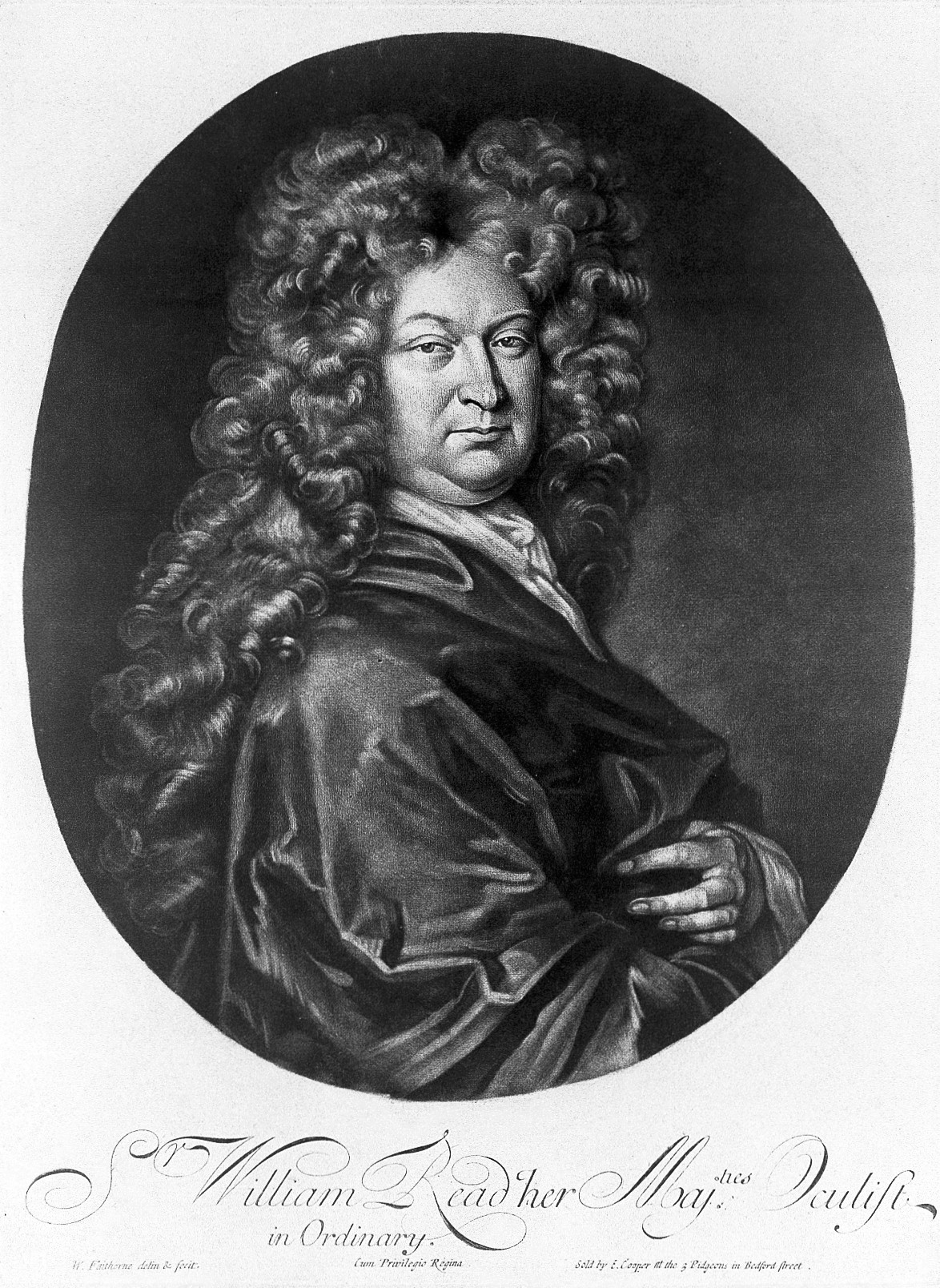
- Born: 1648; Aberdeen
- Died: 1715 (aged 66–67); Rochester
- Occupation: Oculist

William Read (1648 - May 24, 1715) was a well-known unqualified quack medical practitioner who made fraudulent medical claims, styled himself as an oculist and was knighted by Queen Anne for his medical services.

== Career ==
Read was born in Aberdeen. He was the son of a cobbler and originally worked as a tailor. He was illiterate. He practiced ophthalmology in the North and West of England for many years, and by 1694, settled at York Buildings in Strand, London. He was known for his charlatan advertisements; for example, he claimed in the Tatler that "he had been thirty-five years in the practice of couching cataracts, taking off all sorts of wens, curing wry necks and hair-lips without blemish."

In 1705, Read was appointed oculist to Anne, Queen of Great Britain. On July 27, Read was knighted by Queen Anne for his services. Queen Anne, who suffered from weak eyes has been described as a "natural prey of quacks". Read advertised himself as "Her Majesty's Oculist". A 1705 poem in honour of Read, "The Oculist" that appears in pamphlet form, is stored at the British Museum and the library of the Royal Society of Medicine.

In 1706, Read authored a major work A Short But Exact Account of All the Diseases Incident to the Eyes. Many years later in 1932, ophthalmologist Arnold Sorsby revealed that part of the book was plagiarized from Richard Banister's A Treatise of One Hundred and Thirteene Diseases of the Eyes, and Eye-liddes.

He was appointed oculist to George I of Great Britain in 1714. Read died in Rochester on May 24, 1715, and is buried at St Nicholas' Church.

== Publications ==
- A Short but Exact Account of All the Diseases Incident to the Eyes (1706)

== See also ==
- Roger Grant (oculist)
- John Taylor (oculist)
