= Black stomach =

Black stomach is a condition that results from acute gastric necrosis. The tarry black colour is produced by the coagulative necrosis of mucosa resulting in intramucosal haemorrhage and acid hematin deposition. This condition was first described in a patient with acid poisoning. A similar condition has been described in acute esophageal necrosis due to mucosal ischemia resulting from hemodynamic compromise.
