= Richard Long (died 1760) =

English landowner and Tory politician

Richard Long (ca. 1691 – 1760) of Rood Ashton, Wiltshire, was an English landowner and Tory politician who sat in the House of Commons from 1734 to 1741.

Long was born in Steeple Ashton, Wiltshire, the eldest son of Richard Long of Rood Ashton and his first wife Elizabeth Long, daughter of Thomas Long of Rowden, Chippenham. He was admitted at the Middle Temple in 1706 and matriculated at Queen's College, Oxford on 8 May 1707, aged 17. He married Anne Martyn, daughter and heiress of John Martyn of Hinton, Steeple Ashton. He succeeded in 1730 to the Chippenham estate of his maternal uncle Thomas Long.

Long was elected as Tory member of parliament for Chippenham in a fierce contest at the 1734 general election. His only recorded vote was against the Spanish Convention in 1739. He did not stand at the 1741 general election.

Long died on 6 May 1760. He and his wife had two sons and three daughters. His grandson, by his son Richard, was Richard Godolphin Long.
