= Joshua Ward =

English doctor and chemist

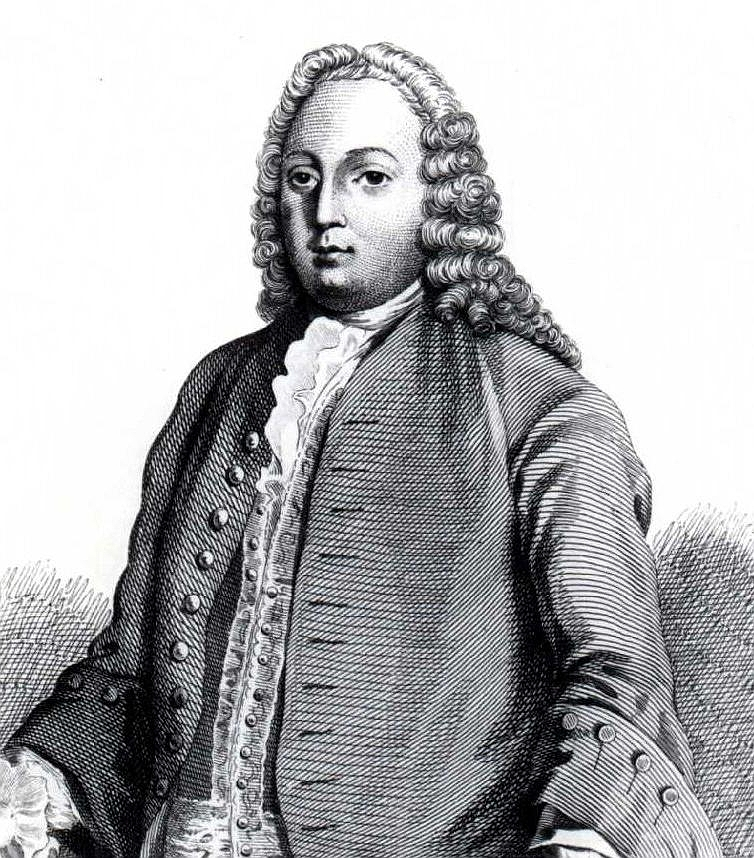
Joshua Ward (1685–1761)

Joshua Ward (1685–1761) was an English medical doctor, most remembered for the invention of Friar's Balsam. He sat briefly in the House of Commons from 1715 to 1717.

== Life ==
Ward was born in Yorkshire. He was the brother of John Ward, who was MP for several years. At the 1715 general election Ward was returned as Member of Parliament for Marlborough, through the artifice of one of the mayors, but was unseated on petition in 1717.

Ward went to France where he practiced as a quack doctor, but returned to London in 1734. He invented a medicine called "Joshua Ward's drop", also known as the "Pill and Drop". It was supposed to cure people of any illness they had, gaining acclaim and notoriety for Ward. Ward is widely cited as an example of a quack. His pills, which he claimed could cure any illness, are suspected of containing large amounts of antimony, which is poisonous and could cause permanent liver damage. The pills were artificially coloured red, purple and blue. The historian Jeremy Black has noted that "his remedies killed as many as they cured".

The chemist Joseph Clutton published an analysis of Ward's pills in A True and Candid Relation of the Good and Bad Effects of Joshua Ward's Pill and Drop in 1736. He found that two of the pills contained antimony and cobalt and the other arsenic.

In 1736, Ward set up the Great Vitriol Works in Twickenham to produce sulphuric acid. It used a process discovered in the seventeenth century by Johann Glauber, in which sulphur is burned together with saltpetre (potassium nitrate), in the presence of steam. As the saltpetre decomposes, it oxidises the sulphur to sulphur trioxide, which combines with water to produce sulphuric acid. This was the first practical production of sulphuric acid on a large scale.

Ward was in many ways quite generous to those living in poverty. He opened hospitals for the poor in Westminster and the City of London, and the clinics did not charge people for their service. It is estimated that he gave around the sum of £3,000 to charity.

Ward is buried in Westminster Abbey.

== Memorials ==
A statue of Ward, by his good friend Agostino Carlini, is in the Victoria and Albert Museum.

Parliament of Great Britain
Preceded by Gabriel Roberts; Hon. Robert Bruce	Member of Parliament for Marlborough; 1715–1717; With: Sir William Humphreys	Succeeded by Sir William Humphreys; Gabriel Roberts
