= List of MPs elected in the 1727 British general election =

1727–1734 Parliament of Great Britain
| ← | 1722–1727 Parliament | 1734–1741 Parliament | → |

Overview
- Legislative body: Parliament of Great Britain
- Meeting place: Palace of Westminster
- Term: 23 January 1728 – 17 April 1734
- Election: 1727 British general election
- Government: Walpole ministry (from 15 May 1730); Walpole–Townshend ministry (until 15 May 1730)

House of Commons
- Members: 558
- Speaker: Arthur Onslow
- Leader: Robert Walpole
- Prime Minister: Robert Walpole

House of Lords
- Lord Chancellor: Baron Talbot (from 29 November 1733); Baron King (until 29 November 1733)
- Leader: Earl of Harrington (from May 1730); Viscount Townshend (until May 1730)

Crown-in-Parliament George II

Sessions
- 1st: 23 January 1728 – 28 May 1728
- 2nd: 21 January 1729 – 14 May 1729
- 3rd: 13 January 1730 – 15 May 1730
- 4th: 21 January 1731 – 7 May 1731
- 5th: 13 January 1732 – 1 June 1732
- 6th: 16 January 1733 – 13 June 1733
- 7th: 17 January 1734 – 16 April 1734

List of MPs elected in the 1727 British general election

This is a list of the 558 MPs or members of Parliament elected to the 314 constituencies of the Parliament of Great Britain in 1727, the 7th Parliament of Great Britain and their replacements returned at subsequent by-elections, arranged by constituency.

Elections took place between 14 August 1727 and 17 October 1727.

Table of contents:

A B C D E F G H I J K L M N O P Q R S T U V W X Y Z By-elections Changes

== A ==
| Aberdeen Burghs (seat 1/1) | John Middleton | Whig |
| Aberdeenshire (seat 1/1) | Sir Archibald Grant - expelled Replaced by Sir Arthur Forbes 1732 | . Whig |
| Abingdon (seat 1/1) | Robert Hucks | Whig |
| Aldborough (seat 1/2) | Charles Stanhope | Whig |
| Aldborough (seat 2/2) | William Jessop | Whig |
| Aldeburgh (seat 1/2) | William Windham - died Replaced by Sir John Williams 1730 | . Tory |
| Aldeburgh (seat 2/2) | Samuel Lowe - died Replaced by George Purvis 1732 | . Whig |
| Amersham (seat 1/2) | Montague Garrard Drake - died Replaced by Marmaduke Alington 1728 | Tory; Tory |
| Amersham (seat 2/2) | Baptist Leveson-Gower - sat for Newcastle-under-Lyme; Replaced by Thomas Lutwyche 1728 | Tory; Tory |
| Andover (seat 1/2) | James Brudenell | Whig |
| Andover (seat 2/2) | Viscount Milsington – raised to peerage Replaced by William Guidott 1730 | .Whig; Whig |
| Anglesey (seat 1/1) | Hugh Williams | Whig |
| Anstruther Easter Burghs (seat 1/1) | Philip Anstruther | |
| Appleby (seat 1/2) | Sackville Tufton – succeeded to peerage Replaced by Walter Plumer 1730 | Tory; Whig |
| Appleby (seat 2/2) | John Ramsden | Ind Whig |
| Argyllshire (seat 1/1) | Sir James Campbell | |
| Arundel (seat 1/2) | Sir John Shelley, Bt | Whig |
| Arundel (seat 2/2) | The Viscount Gage – sat for Tewkesbury; Replaced by John Lumley 1728 | |
| Ashburton (seat 1/2) | Richard Reynell | Tory |
| Ashburton (seat 2/2) | Roger Tuckfield | Whig |
| Aylesbury (seat 1/2) | Sir William Stanhope - sat for Buckinghamshire; Replaced by Edward Rudge 1728 | . Whig |
| Aylesbury (seat 2/2) | Philip Lloyd - took office Replaced by Thomas Ingoldsby 1730 | |
| Ayr Burghs (seat 1/1) | William Steuart | Whig |
| Ayrshire (seat 1/1) | James Campbell | Whig |
== B ==
| Banbury (seat 1/1) | Francis North -succeeded to peerage Replaced by Toby Chauncy 1730 - died Replaced by Viscount Wallingford 1733 | Tory.. |
| Banffshire (seat 1/1) | William Duff | Tory |
| Barnstaple (seat 1/2) | Richard Coffin | Whig |
| Barnstaple (seat 2/2) | Theophilus Fortescue | Whig |
| Bath (seat 1/2) | General George Wade | |
| Bath (seat 2/2) | Robert Gay | |
| Beaumaris (seat 1/1) | Watkin Williams Wynn - sat for Denbighshire; Replaced by The Viscount Bulkeley 1730 | Tory; Tory |
| Bedford (seat 1/2) | John Orlebar | Whig |
| Bedford (seat 2/2) | John Thurlow Brace - unseated on petition Replaced by James Metcalfe 1728 - died Replaced by Sir Jeremy Sambrooke 1731 | . Whig; Tory |
| Bedfordshire (seat 1/2) | Pattee Byng -succeeded to peerage Replaced by Charles Leigh 1733 | Tory |
| Bedfordshire (seat 2/2) | Sir Rowland Alston, 4th Bt | Whig |
| Bere Alston (seat 1/2) | Sir John Hobart- sat for Norfolk; Replaced by Sir Archer Croft 1728 | |
| Bere Alston (seat 2/2) | Sir Francis Henry Drake - sat for Tavistock; Replaced by Lord Walden -succeeded to peerage Replaced by William Morden 1734 | . Whig |
| Berkshire (seat 1/2) | Sir John Stonhouse, Bt - died Replaced by William Archer 1734 | Tory |
| Berkshire (seat 2/2) | Robert Packer died Replaced by Winchcombe Howard Packer 1731 | Tory |
| Berwickshire (seat 1/1) | George Baillie | |
| Berwick-upon-Tweed (seat 1/2) | George Liddell | Whig |
| Berwick-upon-Tweed (seat 2/2) | Joseph Sabine | |
| Beverley (seat 1/2) | Ellerker Bradshaw – unseated on petition Replaced by Sir Charles Hotham 1729 | Whig. Whig |
| Beverley (seat 2/2) | Charles Pelham | Tory |
| Bewdley (seat 1/1) | Crewe Offley | Whig |
| Bishop's Castle (seat 1/2) | Robert More | Whig |
| Bishop's Castle (seat 2/2) | John Plumptre | |
| Bletchingley (seat 1/2) | Sir Orlando Bridgeman | Whig |
| Bletchingley (seat 2/2) | (Sir)William Clayton | |
| Bodmin (seat 1/2) | Robert Booth - died Replaced by Sir John Heathcote 1733 | Opp. Whig. Whig |
| Bodmin (seat 2/2) | John LaRoche | Whig |
| Boroughbridge (seat 1/2) | George Gregory | Whig |
| Boroughbridge (seat 2/2) | James Tyrrell | |
| Bossiney (seat 1/2) | Robert Corker died Replaced by James Cholmondeley 1731 | |
| Bossiney (seat 2/2) | John Hedges | |
| Boston (seat 1/2) | Henry Pacey - died Replaced by The Lord Coleraine 1730 | |
| Boston (seat 2/2) | Richard Ellys | Whig |
| Brackley (seat 1/2) | Hon. William Egerton - died Replaced by George Lee 1733 | . Whig |
| Brackley (seat 2/2) | Paul Methuen | Whiog |
| Bramber (seat 1/2) | Sir Richard Gough - died Replaced by John Gumley 1728 - unseated on petition Replaced by James Hoste 1728 | . Tory; Whig |
| Bramber (seat 2/2) | Joseph Danvers | |
| Brecon (seat 1/1) | Thomas Morgan | |
| Breconshire (seat 1/1) | William Gwyn Vaughan | |
| Bridgnorth (seat 1/2) | St John Charlton | |
| Bridgnorth (seat 2/2) | John Weaver | |
| Bridgwater (seat 1/2) | George Bubb Dodington | Whig |
| Bridgwater (seat 2/2) | Sir Halswell Tynte - died Replaced by Thomas Palmer 1731 | Tory; Tory |
| Bridport (seat 1/2) | William Bowles | Whig |
| Bridport (seat 2/2) | James Pelham - sat for Newark; Replaced by John Jewkes 1730 | |
| Bristol (seat 1/2) | John Scrope | |
| Bristol (seat 2/2) | Sir Abraham Elton, Bt | Whig |
| Buckingham (seat 1/2) | Thomas Lewis - sat for Salisbury; Replaced by George Chamberlayne 1728 | . Whig |
| Buckingham (seat 2/2) | John Fane | |
| Buckinghamshire (seat 1/2) | William Stanhope | Opp.Whig |
| Buckinghamshire (seat 2/2) | Richard Hampden - died Replaced by Sir Thomas Lee 1729 | . Whig |
| Bury St Edmunds (seat 1/2) | Lord Hervey -raised to peerage Replaced by Thomas Hervey 1733 | |
| Bury St Edmunds (seat 2/2) | Thomas Norton | Whig |
| Buteshire (seat 0/0) | Alternating seat with Caithness - unrepresented in this Parliament | |
== C ==
| Caernarvon Boroughs (seat 1/1) | Sir Thomas Wynn, Bt | Whig |
| Caernarvonshire (seat 1/1) | John Griffith | Whig |
| Caithness (seat 1/1) | Sir Patrick Dunbar, 3rd Baronet | |
| Callington (seat 1/2) | Thomas Coplestone | Whig |
| Callington (seat 2/2) | Sir John Coryton | |
| Calne (seat 1/2) | William Duckett | Whig |
| Calne (seat 2/2) | William Wardour | |
| Cambridge (seat 1/2) | Sir John Hynde Cotton | Tory |
| Cambridge (seat 2/2) | Thomas Bacon | Tory |
| Cambridgeshire (seat 1/2) | Henry Bromley | Whig |
| Cambridgeshire (seat 2/2) | Samuel Shepheard | |
| Cambridge University (seat 1/2) | Edward Finch | Whig |
| Cambridge University (seat 2/2) | Thomas Townshend | Whig |
| Camelford (seat 1/2) | Thomas Hales | Whig |
| Camelford (seat 2/2) | John Pitt | |
| Canterbury (seat 1/2) | Sir William Hardres, Bt | Tory |
| Canterbury (seat 2/2) | Sir Thomas Hales, Bt | Whig |
| Cardiff Boroughs (seat 1/1) | Bussy Mansel | |
| Cardigan Boroughs (seat 1/1) | Francis Cornwallis - died Replaced by Double Return Richard Lloyd and Thomas Powell; Richard Lloyd declared elected 1730 | . Whig |
| Cardiganshire (seat 1/1) | John Vaughan, 2nd Viscount Lisburne | |
| Carlisle (seat 1/2) | Charles Howard | |
| Carlisle (seat 2/2) | John Hylton | Tory |
| Carmarthen (seat 1/1) | Arthur Bevan | Whig |
| Carmarthenshire (seat 1/1) | Sir Nicholas Williams | Whig |
| Castle Rising (seat 1/2) | The Earl of Mountrath | |
| Castle Rising (seat 2/2) | Charles Churchill | Whig |
| Cheshire (seat 1/2) | Charles Cholmondeley | Tory |
| Cheshire (seat 2/2) | Sir Robert Salusbury Cotton, Bt | |
| Chester (seat 1/2) | Sir Thomas Grosvenor - died Replaced by Sir Charles Bunbury 1733 | Tory; Tory |
| Chester (seat 2/2) | Sir Richard Grosvenor, Bt - died Replaced by Robert Grosvenor 1733 | . Tory |
| Chichester (seat 1/2) | Lord William Beauclerk - died Replaced by Sir Thomas Prendergast 1733 | |
| Chichester (seat 2/2) | Charles Lumley - died Replaced by James Lumley 1729 | |
| Chippenham (seat 1/2) | Rogers Holland | Whig |
| Chippenham (seat 2/2) | Gabriel Roberts | |
| Chipping Wycombe (seat 1/2) | Harry Waller | Whig |
| Chipping Wycombe (seat 2/2) | William Lee resigned Replaced by Sir Charles Vernon 1731 | . Tory |
| Christchurch (seat 1/2) | Joseph Hinxman | |
| Christchurch (seat 2/2) | Charles Wither - died Replaced by Philip Lloyd 1732 | Whig. |
| Cirencester (seat 1/2) | Thomas Master | Tory |
| Cirencester (seat 2/2) | Peter Bathurst | Tory |
| City of Durham | see Durham (City of) | ... |
| City of London | see London (City of) | ... |
| Clackmannanshire (seat 0/0) | Alternating seat with Kinross-shire - unrepresented in this Parliament | |
| Clitheroe (seat 1/2) | Thomas Lister | Tory |
| Clitheroe (seat 2/2) | The Viscount Galway | Whig |
| Clyde Burghs | see Glasgow Burghs | ... |
| Cockermouth (seat 1/2) | Wilfrid Lawson | Opp.Whig |
| Cockermouth (seat 2/2) | William Finch | Opp. Whig |
| Colchester (seat 1/2) | Stamp Brooksbank | Whig |
| Colchester (seat 2/2) | Samuel Tufnell | Whig |
| Corfe Castle (seat 1/2) | John Bond | |
| Corfe Castle (seat 2/2) | John Bankes | |
| Cornwall (seat 1/2) | Sir William Carew, Bt | Tory |
| Cornwall (seat 2/2) | Sir John St Aubyn, Bt | Tory |
| County Durham | see Durham (County) | ... |
| Coventry (seat 1/2) | Sir Adolphus Oughton | Whig |
| Coventry (seat 2/2) | John Neale | |
| Cricklade (seat 1/2) | Sir Thomas Reade | Whig |
| Cricklade (seat 2/2) | Christopher Tilson | Whig |
| Cromartyshire (seat 1/1) | Sir Kenneth Mackenzie - died Replaced by Sir George Mackenzie 1729 | |
| Cumberland (seat 1/2) | James Lowther | Whig |
| Cumberland (seat 2/2) | Gilfrid Lawson | |
== D ==
| Dartmouth (seat 1/2) | George Treby | Whig |
| Dartmouth (seat 2/2) | Walter Carey | Whig |
| Denbigh Boroughs (seat 1/1) | Robert Myddelton - died Replaced by John Myddelton 1733 | . Tory |
| Denbighshire (seat 1/1) | Watkin Williams | Tory |
| Derby (seat 1/2) | Lord James Cavendish | Whig |
| Derby (seat 2/2) | William Stanhope- raised to peerage Replaced by Charles Stanhope 1730 | Whig; Opp.Whig |
| Derbyshire (seat 1/2) | Godfrey Clarke | |
| Derbyshire (seat 2/2) | Sir Nathaniel Curzon, 4th Bt. | Tory |
| Devizes (seat 1/2) | Francis Eyles | Whig |
| Devizes (seat 2/2) | Benjamin Haskins Stiles | |
| Devon (seat 1/2) | Sir William Courtenay | Whig |
| Devon (seat 2/2) | John Rolle - died Replaced by Henry Rolle 1730 | Tory; Tory |
| Dorchester (seat 1/2) | (Sir) William Chapple | Whig |
| Dorchester (seat 2/2) | John Browne | Tory |
| Dorset (seat 1/2) | George Chafin | Tory |
| Dorset (seat 2/2) | Edmund Morton Pleydell | Tory |
| Dover (seat 1/2) | George Berkeley | |
| Dover (seat 2/2) | Henry Furnese | |
| Downton (seat 1/2) | John Verney | Whig |
| Downton (seat 2/2) | Giles Eyre | |
| Droitwich (seat 1/2) | Richard Foley - died Replaced by Edward Foley 1732 | . Tory? |
| Droitwich (seat 2/2) | Thomas Winnington | Whig |
| Dumfries Burghs (seat 1/1) | Archibald Douglas | |
| Dumfriesshire (seat 1/1) | Charles Erskine | |
| Dunbartonshire (seat 1/1) | John Campbell | Whig |
| Dunwich (seat 1/2) | Sir George Downing, Bt | Whig |
| Dunwich (seat 2/2) | Thomas Wyndham | |
| Durham (City of) (seat 1/2) | Robert Shafto – died Replaced by John Shafto 1730 | .Tory; Tory |
| Durham (City of) (seat 2/2) | Charles Talbot raised to peerage Replaced by Henry Lambton 1734 | . Whig |
| Durham (County) (seat 1/2) | George Bowes | Whig |
| Durham (County) (seat 2/2) | John Hedworth | Ind. Whig |
| Dysart Burghs (seat 1/1) | James St Clair | |
== E ==
| East Grinstead (seat 1/2) | The Viscount Palmerston | Whig |
| East Grinstead (seat 2/2) | The Viscount Shannon | |
| East Looe (seat 1/2) | Charles Longueville | Whig |
| East Looe (seat 2/2) | Sir John Trelawny | |
| East Retford (seat 1/2) | Thomas White - died Replaced by John White 1733 | WHig; Whig |
| East Retford (seat 2/2) | Sir Robert Clifton | |
| Edinburgh (seat 1/1) | John Campbell | |
| Edinburghshire (seat 1/1) | Robert Dundas | Tory |
| Elgin Burghs (seat 1/1) | William Steuart - sat for Ayr Burghs; Replaced by Patrick Campbell 1728 | Whig; Whig |
| Elginshire (seat 1/1) | Alexander Brodie | |
| Essex (seat 1/2) | The Viscount Castlemaine | |
| Essex (seat 2/2) | Sir Robert Abdy | Tory |
| Evesham (seat 1/2) | Sir John Rushout | Whig |
| Evesham (seat 2/2) | John Rudge | Whig |
| Exeter (seat 1/2) | Samuel Molyneux; Replaced by John Belfield 1728 | . Tory |
| Exeter (seat 2/2) | Francis Drewe | Tory |
| Eye (seat 1/2) | Stephen Cornwallis | Whig |
| Eye (seat 2/2) | John Cornwallis | Whig |
== F ==
| Fife (seat 1/1) | Sir John Anstruther | |
| Flint Boroughs (seat 1/1) | Thomas Eyton Double return Salusbury Lloyd | |
| Flintshire (seat 1/1) | Sir Roger Mostyn | |
| Forfarshire (seat 1/1) | James Scott - died Replaced by Robert Scott 1733 | |
| Fowey (seat 1/2) | Jonathan Rashleigh | Tory |
| Fowey (seat 2/2) | The Viscount FitzWilliam 1727 | Tory |
== G ==
| Gatton (seat 1/2) | William Newland | Tory |
| Gatton (seat 2/2) | Paul Docminique | Tory |
| Glamorganshire (seat 1/1) | Sir Charles Kemeys | |
| Glasgow Burghs (seat 1/1) | John Blackwood – unseated on petition Replaced by Daniel Campbell | |
| Gloucester (seat 1/2) | Benjamin Bathurst | |
| Gloucester (seat 2/2) | Charles Selwyn | |
| Gloucestershire (seat 1/2) | Henry Berkeley | |
| Gloucestershire (seat 2/2) | Sir John Dutton, Bt | |
| Grampound (seat 1/2) | Philip Hawkins | Whig |
| Grampound (seat 2/2) | Humphry Morice - died Replaced by Isaac le Heup 1731 | Whig; Whig |
| Grantham (seat 1/2) | Sir Michael Newton | |
| Grantham (seat 2/2) | The Viscount Tyrconnel | Whig |
| Great Bedwyn (seat 1/2) | Sir William Willys - died Replaced by Francis Seymour 1732 | |
| Great Bedwyn (seat 2/2) | Viscount Lewisham – election void Replaced by William Sloper 1729 | |
| Great Grimsby (seat 1/2) | John Page | |
| Great Grimsby (seat 2/2) | George Monson | |
| Great Marlow (seat 1/2) | Edmund Waller | Whig |
| Great Marlow (seat 2/2) | John Clavering - resigned Replaced by George Robinson 1731- expelled Replaced by Sir Thomas Hoby 1732 | |
| Great Yarmouth (seat 1/2) | William Townshend | |
| Great Yarmouth (seat 2/2) | Horatio Walpole | Whig |
| Guildford (seat 1/2) | Arthur Onslow - sat for Surrey; Replaced by Henry Vincent 1728 | Whig; Whig |
| Guildford (seat 2/2) | Colonel Richard Onslow | Whig |
== H ==
| Haddington Burghs (seat 1/1) | Sir James Dalrymple, 2nd Baronet | |
| Haddingtonshire (seat 1/1) | John Cockburn | |
| Hampshire (seat 1/2) | Lord Harry Powlett | Whig |
| Hampshire (seat 2/2) | Sir John Cope | |
| Harwich (seat 1/2) | Sir Philip Parker-a-Morley-Long, Bt | Whig |
| Harwich (seat 2/2) | John Perceval | |
| Haslemere (seat 1/2) | James Oglethorpe | Tory |
| Haslemere (seat 2/2) | Peter Burrell | |
| Hastings (seat 1/2) | Thomas Townshend - sat for Cambridge University; Replaced by Thomas Pelham 1728 | Whig |
| Hastings (seat 2/2) | Sir William Ashburnham | |
| Haverfordwest (seat 1/1) | Sir Erasmus Philipps | |
| Hedon (seat 1/2) | Harry Pulteney | Whig |
| Hedon (seat 2/2) | William Pulteney | Whig |
| Helston (seat 1/2) | John Evelyn | Whig |
| Helston (seat 2/2) | John Harris | |
| Hereford (seat 1/2) | Marquess of Carnarvon | |
| Hereford (seat 2/2) | Thomas Geers | Tory |
| Herefordshire (seat 1/2) | Velters Cornewall | Tory |
| Herefordshire (seat 2/2) | Edward Harley | Tory |
| Hertford (seat 1/2) | George Harrison | |
| Hertford (seat 2/2) | Sir Thomas Clarke | |
| Hertfordshire (seat 1/2) | Charles Caesar | Tory |
| Hertfordshire (seat 2/2) | Sir Thomas Sebright, Bt | Tory |
| Heytesbury (seat 1/2) | Horatio Townshend | Whig |
| Heytesbury (seat 2/2) | Edward Ashe | Whig |
| Higham Ferrers (seat 1/1) | John Finch | |
| Hindon (seat 1/2) | George Heathcote | Whig |
| Hindon (seat 2/2) | Townsend Andrews | Whig |
| Honiton (seat 1/2) | James Sheppard; Replaced by Sir William Pole 1731 | . Tory |
| Honiton (seat 2/2) | Sir William Yonge | Whig |
| Horsham (seat 1/2) | Charles Eversfield | Whig |
| Horsham (seat 2/2) | Henry Ingram | |
| Huntingdon (seat 1/2) | Edward Wortley Montagu | Whig |
| Huntingdon (seat 2/2) | Roger Handasyd | |
| Huntingdonshire (seat 1/2) | John Bigg | Whig |
| Huntingdonshire (seat 2/2) | Marquess of Hartington -succeeded to peerage Replaced by Robert Piggott 1730 | Whig; Whig |
| Hythe (seat 1/2) | Captain Hercules Baker | Whig |
| Hythe (seat 2/2) | Sir Samuel Lennard - died Replaced by William Glanville 1728 | Whig. Whig |
== I ==
| Ilchester (seat 1/2) | Charles Lockyer | Whig |
| Ilchester (seat 2/2) | Thomas Crisp | Whig |
| Inverness Burghs (seat 1/1) | Duncan Forbes | Whig |
| Inverness-shire (seat 1/1) | Sir James Grant, Bt. | Whig |
| Ipswich (seat 1/2) | William Thompson - resigned Replaced by Philip Broke 1730 | Whig; Tory |
| Ipswich (seat 2/2) | Francis Negus - died Replaced by William Wollaston 1733 | Whig; Whig |
== K ==
| Kent (seat 1/2) | Sir Roger Meredith | Whig |
| Kent (seat 2/2) | Sir Robert Furnese died Replaced by Sir Edward Dering 1733 | Whig; Tory |
| Kincardineshire (seat 1/1) | James Scott | |
| King's Lynn (seat 1/2) | Sir Robert Walpole | Whig |
| King's Lynn (seat 2/2) | Sir Charles Turner | Whig |
| Kingston upon Hull (seat 1/2) | George Crowle | Whig |
| Kingston upon Hull (seat 2/2) | The Viscount Micklethwaite - died Replaced by Henry Maister 1734 | Whig; Whig |
| Kinross-shire (seat 1/1) | John Hope | |
| Kirkcudbright Stewartry (seat 1/1) | Patrick Heron | |
| Knaresborough (seat 1/2) | Richard Arundell | Whig |
| Knaresborough (seat 2/2) | Sir Henry Slingsby, Bt | Tory |
== L ==
| Lanarkshire (seat 1/1) | Lord Archibald Hamilton | Whig |
| Lancashire (seat 1/2) | Sir Edward Stanley | |
| Lancashire (seat 2/2) | Richard Shuttleworth | Tory |
| Lancaster (seat 1/2) | Christopher Tower | Whig |
| Lancaster (seat 2/2) | Sir Thomas Lowther | |
| Launceston (seat 1/2) | Hon. John King | |
| Launceston (seat 2/2) | Arthur Tremayne | Tory |
| Leicester (seat 1/2) | George Wrighte | Tory |
| Leicester (seat 2/2) | Sir George Beaumont | Tory |
| Leicestershire (seat 1/2) | Sir Clobery Noel - died Replaced by Ambrose Phillipps 1734 | Tory; Tory |
| Leicestershire (seat 2/2) | Lord William Manners | |
| Leominster (seat 1/2) | The Viscount Bateman | Whig |
| Leominster (seat 2/2) | Sir George Caswall | Whig |
| Lewes (seat 1/2) | Thomas Pelham I | Whig |
| Lewes (seat 2/2) | Thomas Pelham II | |
| Lichfield (seat 1/2) | Walter Chetwynd - took office Replaced by George Venables Vernon 1731 | Whig. |
| Lichfield (seat 2/2) | Richard Plumer | |
| Lincoln (seat 1/2) | Charles Hall | Tory |
| Lincoln (seat 2/2) | Sir John Monson – raised to peerage Replaced by Sir John Tyrwhitt 1728 | . Whig |
| Lincolnshire (seat 1/2) | Robert Vyner | Ing.Whig |
| Lincolnshire (seat 2/2) | Sir Thomas Lumley Saunderson | Opp.Whig |
| Linlithgow Burghs (seat 1/1) | John Murray | |
| Linlithgowshire (seat 1/1) | Alexander Hamilton | |
| Liskeard (seat 1/2) | Thomas Clutterbuck | |
| Liskeard (seat 2/2) | Sir John Cope | Whig |
| Liverpool (seat 1/2) | Thomas Brereton -took office Replaced by Sir Thomas Aston 1729 | Whig; Opp.Whig |
| Liverpool (seat 2/2) | Thomas Bootle | Opp.Whig |
| London (City of) (seat 1/4) | Sir John Eyles, Bt | Whig |
| London (City of) (seat 2/4) | Sir John Barnard | Whig |
| London (City of) (seat 3/4) | Micajah Perry | Whig |
| London (City of) (seat 4/4) | Humphry Parsons | Tory |
| Lostwithiel (seat 1/2) | Sir Orlando Bridgeman - sat for Bletchingley; Replaced by Anthony Cracherode 1728 | Whig; Whig |
| Lostwithiel (seat 2/2) | Darell Trelawny - died Replaced by Sir Edward Knatchbull 1728 - died Replaced by Edward Walpole 1730 | Whig. Whig |
| Ludgershall (seat 1/2) | Charles Boone | |
| Ludgershall (seat 2/2) | Borlase Richmond Webb | Tory |
| Ludlow (seat 1/2) | Henry Herbert | Whig |
| Ludlow (seat 2/2) | Richard Herbert | Whig |
| Lyme Regis (seat 1/2) | Henry Drax | Whig |
| Lyme Regis (seat 2/2) | John Burridge; Replaced by Henry Holt Henley 1728 | Whig; Whig |
| Lymington (seat 1/2) | Lord Nassau Powlett | |
| Lymington (seat 2/2) | Anthony Morgan - died Replaced by William Powlett 1729 | Whig. Whig |
== M ==
| Maidstone (seat 1/2) | Thomas Hope | Whig |
| Maidstone (seat 2/2) | John Finch | Tory |
| Maldon (seat 1/2) | Henry Parsons | Whig |
| Maldon (seat 2/2) | Thomas Bramston | Tory |
| Malmesbury (seat 1/2) | Giles Earle | |
| Malmesbury (seat 2/2) | William Rawlinson Earle | Whig |
| Malton (seat 1/2) | Henry Finch | Whig |
| Malton (seat 2/2) | Wardell George Westby - resigned Replaced by Sir William Wentworth 1731 | |
| Marlborough (seat 1/2) | Thomas Gibson | Whig |
| Marlborough (seat 2/2) | Edward Lisle | Tory |
| Marlow | see Great Marlow | ... |
| Melcombe Regis | see Weymouth and Melcombe Regis | ... |
| Merionethshire (seat 1/1) | Richard Vaughan | Tory |
| Middlesex (seat 1/2) | Hon. James Bertie | Tory |
| Middlesex (seat 2/2) | Sir Francis Child | Tory |
| Midhurst (seat 1/2) | Bulstrode Knight | |
| Midhurst (seat 2/2) | The Viscount Midleton - died Replaced by Sir Richard Mill 1729 | Whig. |
| Milborne Port (seat 1/2) | Michael Harvey | Tory |
| Milborne Port (seat 2/2) | Thomas Medlycott | Whig |
| Minehead (seat 1/2) | Alexander Luttrell | Tory |
| Minehead (seat 2/2) | Francis Whitworth | |
| Mitchell (seat 1/2) | Henry Kelsall | Whig |
| Mitchell (seat 2/2) | Thomas Farrington | |
| Monmouth Boroughs (seat 1/1) | Edward Kemys | Tory |
| Monmouthshire (seat 1/2) | William Morgan - died Replaced by Lord Charles Noel Somerset 1731 | .Whig; Tory |
| Monmouthshire (seat 2/2) | John Hanbury | Whig |
| Montgomery (seat 1/1) | William Corbet | |
| Montgomeryshire (seat 1/1) | Price Devereux | Tory |
| Morpeth (seat 1/2) | Viscount Morpeth | Whig |
| Morpeth (seat 2/2) | Thomas Robinson | |
| Much Wenlock (seat 1/2) | see Wenlock | ... |
== N ==
| Nairnshire (seat 0/0) | Alternating seat with Cromartyshire - unrepresented in this parliament | |
| Newark (seat 1/2) | Richard Sutton | Whig |
| Newark (seat 2/2) | James Pelham | Whig |
| Newcastle-under-Lyme (seat 1/2) | Baptist Leveson-Gower | Tory |
| Newcastle-under-Lyme (seat 2/2) | John Ward | Tory |
| Newcastle-upon-Tyne (seat 1/2) | Sir William Blackett, Bt. – died Replaced by William Carr 1728 | .Tory; Whig |
| Newcastle-upon-Tyne (seat 2/2) | Nicholas Fenwick | Tory |
| Newport (Cornwall) (seat 1/2) | Thomas Herbert | |
| Newport (Cornwall) (seat 2/2) | Sir William Morice | Tory |
| Newport (Isle of Wight) (seat 1/2) | William Fortescue | Whig |
| Newport (Isle of Wight) (seat 2/2) | George Huxley | Whig |
| New Radnor Boroughs (seat 1/1) | Thomas Lewis | Whig |
| New Romney (seat 1/2) | John Essington – unseated on petition Replaced by Sir Robert Austen 1728 | Whig |
| New Romney (seat 2/2) | David Papillon – unseated on petition Replaced by Sir Robert Furnese 1728 - sat for Kent; Replaced by David Papillon 1728 | Whig. Whig |
| New Shoreham (seat 1/2) | Francis Chamberlayne died Replaced by Samuel Ongley 1729 | |
| New Shoreham (seat 2/2) | Sir Nathaniel Gould died Replaced by John Gould 1729 | Whig; Whig |
| Newton (Lancashire) (seat 2/2) | Legh Master | Tory |
| Newton (Lancashire) (seat 1/2) | William Shippen | Tory |
| Newtown (Isle of Wight) (seat 1/2) | James Worsley – unseated on petition Replaced by Charles Armand Powlett | Tory; Whig |
| Newtown (Isle of Wight) (seat 2/2) | Thomas Holmes – unseated on petition Replaced by Sir John Barrington | Whig. |
| New Windsor (seat 1/2) | Lord Vere Beauclerk | |
| New Windsor (seat 2/2) | Viscount Malpas Succeeded to a peerage Replaced by Lord Sidney Beauclerk 1733 | Whig. |
| New Woodstock (seat 2/2) | Samuel Trotman | Tory |
| New Woodstock (seat 1/2) | Marquess of Blandford - died Replaced by John Spencer 1732 | Whig; Whig |
| Norfolk (seat 1/2) | Sir John Hobart – raised to the peerage Replaced by Harbord Harbord 1728 | Whig. |
| Norfolk (seat 2/2) | Sir Thomas Coke - raised to the peerage Replaced by Sir Edmund Bacon 1728 | Whig; Tory |
| Northallerton (seat 1/2) | Leonard Smelt | Whig |
| Northallerton (seat 2/2) | Henry Peirse | |
| Northampton (seat 1/2) | Hon. George Compton | |
| Northampton (seat 2/2) | Edward Montagu | |
| Northamptonshire (seat 1/2) | Sir Justinian Isham, 4th Bt; Replaced by Sir Justinian Isham, 5th Bt | Tory; Tory |
| Northamptonshire (seat 2/2) | Thomas Cartwright | Tory |
| Northumberland (seat 1/2) | Sir William Middleton, Bt | Whig |
| Northumberland (seat 2/2) | Ralph Jenison | |
| Norwich (seat 1/2) | Waller Bacon | Whig |
| Norwich (seat 2/2) | Robert Brightiffe | Whig |
| Nottingham (seat 1/2) | John Stanhope | |
| Nottingham (seat 2/2) | Borlase Warren | Tory |
| Nottinghamshire (seat 1/2) | The Viscount Howe - resigned Replaced by William Levinz 1732 | Whig; Tory |
| Nottinghamshire (seat 2/2) | Sir Robert Sutton - expelled Replaced by Thomas Bennett 1732 | Whig; Whig |
== O ==
| Okehampton (seat 1/2) | William Northmore | Tory |
| Okehampton (seat 2/2) | Thomas Pitt | |
| Old Sarum (seat 1/2) | Thomas Pitt - sat for Okehampton; Replaced by Matthew St Quintin 1728 | . Whig |
| Old Sarum (seat 2/2) | The Earl of Londonderry - took office Replaced Thomas Harrison 1728 | Whig. |
| Orford (seat 1/2) | Dudley North - died Replaced by Robert Kemp 1730 | Tory; Tory |
| Orford (seat 2/2) | Price Devereux - sat for Montgomeryshire; Replaced by William Acton 1729 | Tory; Tory |
| Orkney and Shetland (seat 1/1) | George Douglas – raised to peerage Replaced by Robert Douglas 1730 | |
| Oxford (seat 1/2) | Thomas Rowney, junior | Tory |
| Oxford (seat 2/2) | Francis Knollys | Tory |
| Oxfordshire (seat 1/2) | Sir William Stapleton | Tory |
| Oxfordshire (seat 2/2) | Henry Perrot | Tory |
| Oxford University (seat 1/2) | George Clarke | Tory |
| Oxford University (seat 2/2) | William Bromley - died Replaced by Viscount Cornbury 1732 | Tory; Tory |
== P ==
| Peeblesshire (seat 1/1) | John Douglas - died Replaced by Sir James Nasmyth 1732 | |
| Pembroke Boroughs (seat 1/1) | William Owen | |
| Pembrokeshire (seat 1/1) | John Campbell | |
| Penryn (seat 1/2) | Sir Cecil Bishopp | |
| Penryn (seat 2/2) | Edward Vernon | |
| Perth Burghs (seat 1/1) | John Drummond I | |
| Perthshire (seat 1/1) | John Drummond II | |
| Peterborough (seat 1/2) | The Earl FitzWilliam - died Replaced by Charles Gounter Nicoll 1729 - died Replaced by Armstead Parker 1734 | Whig; Whig; Tory |
| Peterborough (seat 2/2) | Sidney Wortley Montagu - died Replaced by Joseph Banks 1728 | Whig; Whig |
| Petersfield (seat 1/2) | Norton Powlett | Whig |
| Petersfield (seat 2/2) | Joseph Taylor | Tory |
| Plymouth (seat 1/2) | Arthur Stert | Whig |
| Plymouth (seat 2/2) | George Treby - sat for Dartmouth; Replaced by Robert Byng 1728 | Whig; Whig |
| Plympton Erle (seat 1/2) | Richard Edgcumbe | Whig |
| Plympton Erle (seat 2/2) | George Treby - sat for Dartmouth; Replaced by John Fuller 1728 | Whig. |
| Pontefract (seat 1/2) | Sir William Lowther, 1st Bt - died Replaced by Sir William Lowther, 2nd Bt 1729 | |
| Pontefract (seat 2/2) | John Lowther - died Replaced by John Mordaunt 1730 | |
| Poole (seat 1/2) | George Trenchard | Whig |
| Poole (seat 2/2) | Denis Bond - expelled Replaced by Thomas Wyndham 1732 | Whig |
| Portsmouth (seat 1/2) | Sir Charles Wager | Whig |
| Portsmouth (seat 2/2) | Sir John Norris | |
| Preston (seat 1/2) | Daniel Pulteney - died Replaced by Nicholas Fazakerley 1732 | . Tory |
| Preston (seat 2/2) | Sir Henry Hoghton | |
== Q ==
| Queenborough (seat 1/2) | Sprig Manesty - died Replaced by Richard Evans 1729 | .. Whig |
| Queenborough (seat 2/2) | John Crowley - died Replaced by George Saunders 1728 | Tory. |
== R ==
| Radnor Boroughs | see New Radnor Boroughs | ... |
| Radnorshire (seat 1/1) | Sir Humphrey Howorth | Whig |
| Reading (seat 1/2) | Richard Potenger | |
| Reading (seat 2/2) | Richard Thompson | Whig |
| Reigate (seat 1/2) | James Cocks | Whig |
| Reigate (seat 2/2) | Sir Joseph Jekyll | Whig |
| Renfrewshire (seat 1/1) | Sir John Shaw | Whig |
| Richmond (Yorkshire) (seat 1/2) | Charles Bathurst – unseated on petition Replaced by John Yorke | . Whig |
| Richmond (Yorkshire) (seat 2/2) | Sir Marmaduke Wyvill, Bt. – unseated on petition Replaced by Sir Conyers Darcy | . Whig |
| Ripon (seat 1/2) | William Aislabie II | Tory |
| Ripon (seat 2/2) | William Aislabie III | |
| Rochester (seat 1/2) | David Polhill | Whig |
| Rochester (seat 2/2) | Sir John Jennings | Whig |
| Ross-shire (seat 1/1) | Charles Ross - died Replaced by John Munro 1733 | |
| Roxburghshire (seat 1/1) | William Douglas | |
| Rutland (seat 1/2) | Lord Finch - succeeded to a peerage Replaced by William Burton 1730 | . Whig |
| Rutland (seat 2/2) | John Noel - died Replaced by Thomas Noel 1728 | |
| Rye (seat 1/2) | Phillips Gybbon | Whig |
| Rye (seat 2/2) | John Norris - took office Replaced by Matthew Norris 1733 | |
== S ==
| St Albans (seat 1/2) | The Viscount Grimston | Whig |
| St Albans (seat 2/2) | Caleb Lomax - died Replaced by Thomas Gape 1730 - died Replaced by John Merrill 1733 | |
| St Germans (seat 1/2) | Sir Gilbert Heathcote - died Replaced by Dudley Ryder 1733 | Whig |
| St Germans (seat 2/2) | Sidney Godolphin - died Replaced by Richard Eliot 1733 | Whig. |
| St Ives (seat 1/2) | Henry Knollys | |
| St Ives (seat 2/2) | Major-General Sir Robert Rich | |
| St Mawes (seat 1/2) | Henry Vane | Whig |
| St Mawes (seat 2/2) | John Knight - sat for Sudbury; Replaced by William East 1728 | Whig. |
| Salisbury (seat 1/2) | Anthony Duncombe | Whig |
| Salisbury (seat 2/2) | Thomas Lewis | Whig |
| Saltash (seat 1/2) | Lord Glenorchy | Whig |
| Saltash (seat 2/2) | Edward Hughes - died Replaced by Thomas Corbett 1734 | |
| Sandwich (seat 1/2) | Josiah Burchett | Whig |
| Sandwich (seat 2/2) | Sir George Oxenden | Whig |
| Scarborough (seat 1/2) | John Hungerford – died Replaced by William Thompson | Tory; Whig |
| Scarborough (seat 2/2) | Sir William Strickland | Whig |
| Seaford (seat 1/2) | Sir William Gage, Bt | |
| Seaford (seat 2/2) | Philip Yorke -raised to peerage Replaced by William Hay 1734 | Whig; Whig |
| Selkirkshire (seat 1/1) | John Pringle - took office Replaced by James Rutherford 1730 | |
| Shaftesbury (seat 1/2) | Sir Edward des Bouverie | Tory |
| Shaftesbury (seat 2/2) | Stephen Fox | Tory/Whig |
| Shrewsbury (seat 1/2) | Richard Lyster | Tory |
| Shrewsbury (seat 2/2) | Sir John Astley | Tory |
| Shropshire (seat 1/2) | John Walcot | Tory |
| Shropshire (seat 2/2) | William Lacon Childe | Tory |
| Shoreham | see New Shoreham | ... |
| Somerset (seat 1/2) | Thomas Strangways Horner | Tory |
| Somerset (seat 2/2) | Sir William Wyndham, Bt | Tory |
| Southampton (seat 1/2) | Robert Eyre - took office Replaced by William Heathcote 1729 | |
| Southampton (seat 2/2) | Anthony Henley | |
| Southwark (seat 1/2) | Sir Joseph Eyles | Whig |
| Southwark (seat 2/2) | Edmund Halsey - died Replaced by Thomas Inwen 1730 | Whig |
| Stafford (seat 1/2) | Joseph Gascoigne Nightingale | |
| Stafford (seat 2/2) | The Viscount Chetwynd | Whig |
| Staffordshire (seat 1/2) | Sir Walter Wagstaffe Bagot | Tory |
| Staffordshire (seat 2/2) | William Leveson Gower | Tory |
| Stamford (seat 1/2) | William Noel | |
| Stamford (seat 2/2) | Robert Shirley | Tory |
| Steyning (seat 1/2) | The Viscount Vane | Whig |
| Steyning (seat 2/2) | Thomas Bladen | |
| Stirling Burghs (seat 1/1) | Henry Cunningham - sat for Stirlingshire; Replaced by Lord Erskine 1728 | Whig. |
| Stirlingshire (seat 1/1) | Henry Cunningham | Whig |
| Stockbridge (seat 1/2) | John Chetwynd | |
| Stockbridge (seat 2/2) | Martin Bladen | Whig |
| Sudbury (seat 1/2) | John Knight died Replaced by Richard Jackson 1734 | Whig |
| Sudbury (seat 2/2) | Carteret Leathes | |
| Suffolk (seat 1/2) | Sir Jermyn Davers, Bt | Tory |
| Suffolk (seat 2/2) | Sir William Barker - died Replaced by Sir Robert Kemp 1732 | .Tory; Tory |
| Surrey (seat 1/2) | Arthur Onslow | Speaker |
| Surrey (seat 2/2) | Thomas Scawen | Opp. Whig |
| Sussex (seat 1/2) | Henry Pelham | Whig |
| Sussex (seat 2/2) | Hon. Spencer Compton -raised to peerage Replaced by James Butler 1728 | Speaker; Whig |
| Sutherland (seat 1/1) | Lord Strathnaver – raised to peerage Replaced by Sir James Fergusson 1734 | |
== T ==
| Tain Burghs (seat 1/1) | Sir Robert Munro, Bt | Whig |
| Tamworth (seat 1/2) | William O'Brien, 4th Earl of Inchiquin | Whig |
| Tamworth (seat 2/2) | Hon. Thomas Willoughby | Tory |
| Taunton (seat 1/2) | George Speke | Whig |
| Taunton (seat 2/2) | Francis Fane | Whig |
| Tavistock (seat 1/2) | Sir John Cope - sat for Hampshire; Replaced by Sir Humphrey Monoux 1728 | Whig; Tory |
| Tavistock (seat 2/2) | Sir Francis Henry Drake, Bt | |
| Tewkesbury (seat 1/2) | The Viscount Gage | |
| Tewkesbury (seat 2/2) | Brigadier George Reade | Whig |
| Thetford (seat 1/2) | Sir Edmund Bacon | Whig |
| Thetford (seat 2/2) | Robert Jacomb - died Replaced by Charles FitzRoy 1733 | |
| Thirsk (seat 2/2) | Thomas Robinson | |
| Thirsk (seat 1/2) | Sir Thomas Frankland | Whig |
| Tiverton (seat 1/2) | Arthur Arscott | Whig |
| Tiverton (seat 2/2) | Sir William Yonge - sat for Honiton; Replaced by James Nelthorpe 1728 | .Whig; Whig |
| Totnes (seat 2/2) | Exton Sayer - died Replaced by Sir Henry Gough 1732 | Whig. |
| Totnes (seat 1/2) | Charles Wills | Whig |
| Tregony (seat 1/2) | Thomas Smith - died Replaced by Matthew Ducie Moreton 1729 | Whig; Whig |
| Tregony (seat 2/2) | John Goddard | Whig |
| Truro (seat 1/2) | Hugh Boscawen | |
| Truro (seat 2/2) | Sidney Meadows | |
== W ==
| Wallingford (seat 1/2) | George Lewen | Tory |
| Wallingford (seat 2/2) | William Hucks | Whig |
| Wareham (seat 1/2) | Sir Edward Ernle - died Replaced by Thomas Tower 1729 | Whig; Whig |
| Wareham (seat 2/2) | Joseph Gascoigne - died Replaced by Nathaniel Gould 1729 | Whig. |
| Warwick (seat 1/2) | Sir William Keyt | Tory |
| Warwick (seat 2/2) | William Bromley | Tory |
| Warwickshire (seat 1/2) | William Peyto - died Replaced by Sir Charles Mordaunt 1734 | Tory; Tory |
| Warwickshire (seat 2/2) | Edward Digby | Tory |
| Wells (seat 1/2) | Thomas Edwards | Tory |
| Wells (seat 2/2) | Edward Prideaux Gwyn; Replaced by William Piers 1729 | .Tory; Whig |
| Wendover (seat 1/2) | Richard Hampden - sat for Buckinghamshire; Replaced by John Hamilton 1728 | Whig. |
| Wendover (seat 2/2) | The Viscount Limerick | |
| Wenlock (seat 2/2) | John Sambrooke | Whig |
| Wenlock (seat 1/2) | Samuel Edwards | Whig |
| Weobley (seat 1/2) | John Birch - expelled Replaced by James Cornewall 1732 | Whig. |
| Weobley (seat 2/2) | Uvedale Tomkins Price | Whig |
| West Looe (seat 1/2) | Edward Trelawny - resigned Replaced by Thomas Walker 1733 | . Whig |
| West Looe (seat 2/2) | John Willes | |
| Westbury (seat 1/2) | John Gifford | Tory |
| Westbury (seat 2/2) | Francis Annesley | Tory |
| Westminster (seat 1/2) | Charles Cavendish | Whig |
| Westminster (seat 2/2) | William Clayton | Whig |
| Westmorland (seat 1/2) | Anthony Lowther | |
| Westmorland (seat 2/2) | Daniel Wilson | Whig |
| Weymouth and Melcombe Regis (seat 1/4) | Sir James Thornhill | |
| Weymouth and Melcombe Regis (seat 2/4) | Edward Tucker | |
| Weymouth and Melcombe Regis (seat 3/4) | Thomas Pearse | |
| Weymouth and Melcombe Regis (seat 4/4) | William Betts – election void Replaced by George Dodington 1730 | |
| Whitchurch (seat 2/2) | John Selwyn | Whig |
| Whitchurch (seat 1/2) | John Conduitt | |
| Wigan (seat 1/2) | Sir Roger Bradshaigh | Tory |
| Wigan (seat 2/2) | Peter Bold | Tory |
| Wigtown Burghs (seat 1/1) | William Dalrymple - sat for Wigtownshire; Replaced by John Dalrymple 1728 | |
| Wigtownshire (seat 1/1) | William Dalrymple | |
| Wilton (seat 1/2) | Robert Sawyer Herbert | |
| Wilton (seat 2/2) | Thomas Martin | Whig |
| Wiltshire (seat 1/2) | Sir James Long - died Replaced by John Howe 1729 | Tory; Tory |
| Wiltshire (seat 2/2) | John Ivory-Talbot | Tory |
| Winchelsea (seat 1/2) | Robert Bristow II | |
| Winchelsea (seat 2/2) | John Scrope - sat for Bristol; Replaced by Sir Archer Croft 1728 - sat for Bere Alston; Replaced by Peter Walter 1728 | |
| Winchester (seat 1/2) | George Brydges | Whig |
| Winchester (seat 2/2) | Lord William Powlett - died Replaced by Norton Powlett 1730 | |
| Windsor | see New Windsor | ... |
| Woodstock | see New Woodstock | ... |
| Wootton Bassett (seat 1/2) | John St John | |
| Wootton Bassett (seat 2/2) | John Crosse | Whig |
| Worcester (seat 1/2) | Sir Richard Lane | |
| Worcester (seat 2/2) | Samuel Sandys | Whig |
| Worcestershire (seat 1/2) | Sir Herbert Pakington, Bt | Tory |
| Worcestershire (seat 2/2) | Sir Thomas Lyttelton | Whig |
| Wycombe | see Chipping Wycombe | ... |
== Y ==
| Yarmouth (Isle of Wight) (seat 1/2) | Paul Burrard | Whig |
| Yarmouth (Isle of Wight) (seat 2/2) | Maurice Morgan died Replaced by Maurice Bocland 1733 | |
| Yarmouth (Norfolk) | see Great Yarmouth | ... |
| York (seat 1/2) | Sir William Milner, 1st Baronet | |
| York (seat 2/2) | Edward Thompson | |
| Yorkshire (seat 1/2) | Sir Thomas Watson Wentworth – raised to peerage Replaced by Sir George Savile 1728 | Whig |
| Yorkshire (seat 2/2) | Cholmley Turner | Whig |

== By-elections ==
- List of Great Britain by-elections (1715–34)

== See also ==
- 1727 British general election
- List of parliaments of Great Britain
- Unreformed House of Commons
