= Tufnell Park =

Coordinates: 51.557°N 0.134°W

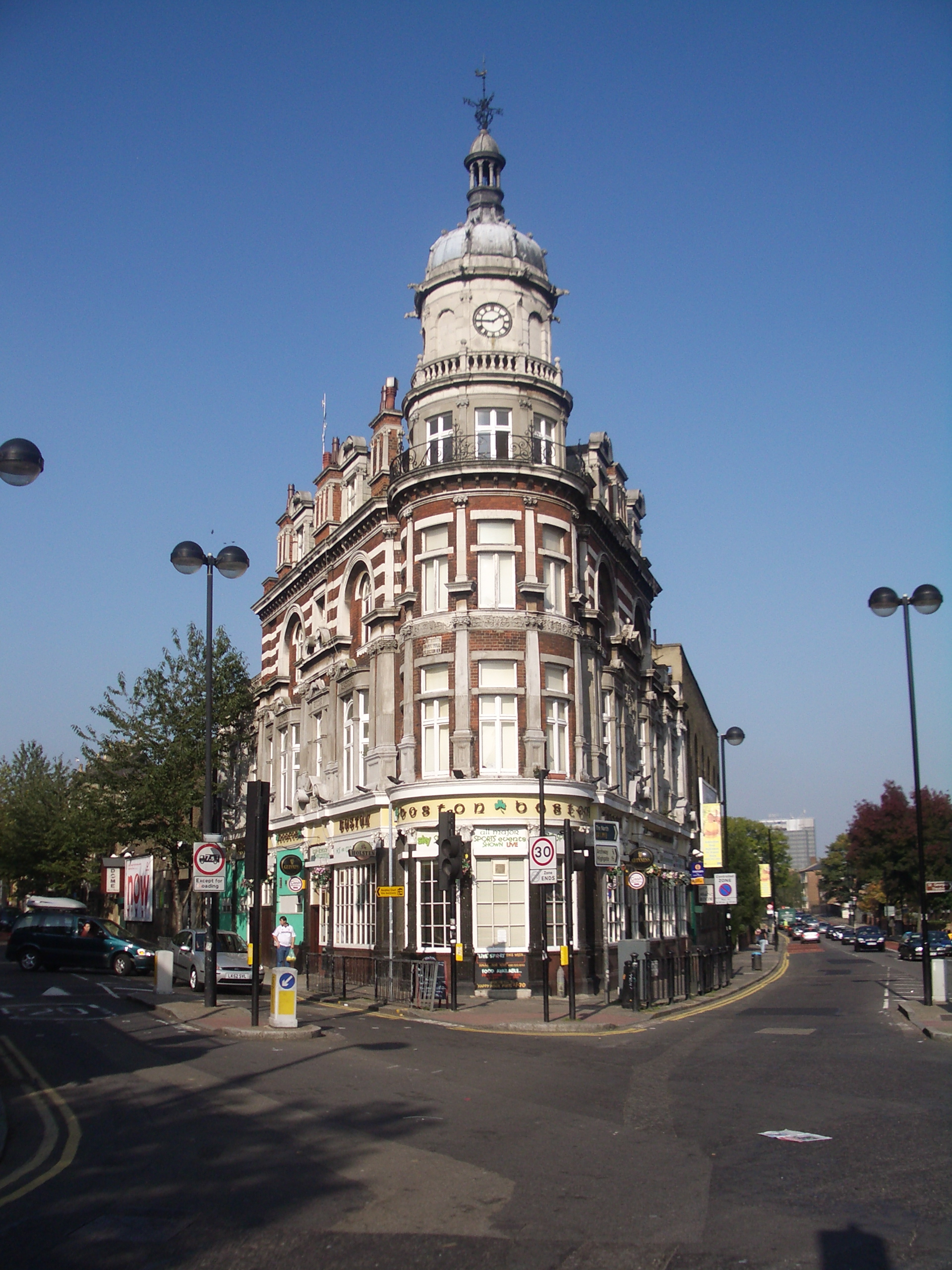

- Location within Greater London
- OS grid reference: TQ295855
- London borough: Camden; Islington
- Ceremonial county: Greater London
- Region: London
- Country: England
- Sovereign state: United Kingdom
- Post town: LONDON
- Postcode district: N7, N19
- Postcode district: NW5
- Dialling code: 020
- Police: Metropolitan
- Fire: London
- Ambulance: London
- UK Parliament: Islington North; Holborn and St Pancras
- London Assembly: Barnet and Camden; North East

Tufnell Park is an area in north London, England, in the London boroughs of Islington and Camden.

The neighbourhood is served by Tufnell Park tube station on the Northern Line.

== History ==
=== Origins and boundary ===
Medieval and later manor

Wards of the United Kingdom are drawn for electoral purposes to give an equal electorate; here the Tufnell Park is in the south of a ward of 1916 named Tufnell.

Tufnell Park Road, a straight of 1.24 kilometres (0.77 mi), was sometimes conjectured by historians to follow the line of a Roman track. There is no evidence of Roman activity in the area and a supposed Roman camp marked on Dent's 1805 parish map has been shown by Museum of London Archaeology excavations to probably be a misidentified medieval moated site. The road has for centuries been an east–west connector between the roads from the hearts of Islington and Camden which converge into a major northern route at Archway market place, across 500 metres of Dartmouth Park district to the north.

Boundaries

North-east of Tufnell Park Road, the housing is closer to Upper Holloway railway station and so is popularly considered to be Upper Holloway district. On all other sides of the road is Tufnell Park based on nearest rail/tube station.

The road which Tufnell Park Road links have been greatly alleviated from sole principal status by diverting in the 20th century the A1 through Edgware where the M1 also runs instead of its old route through High Barnet, converging the route with the straighter A41 road from Marylebone. The A1 road in the east of Tufnell Park is therefore less arterial which reinforces the loss of its old name "the Great North Road", a historical coaching road. It specifically serves vehicles driven between the A1 or M1 and the City of London.

Hackney Brook

Rising north of here at Mercers Road, Hackney Brook, culverted today, ran south to cross Holloway Road near Tufnell Park Road and then flowed to Lowman Road, where it turned north-east and ran along Gillespie Road to leave the traditional bounds of Islington at Mountgrove Road.

Agricultural use

For centuries this northern part of the ancient parish of Islington was part of many square miles renowned for dairy farms which kept the City of London and neighbouring north and west parts supplied with milk. It kept a rural air well into the 19th century in its important role as a base for a number of dairies supplying the capital. In 1753 the area became the property of William Tufnell who was granted the manor of Barnsbury by his father-in-law Sir William Halton. The manor house (now demolished) stood on the site of the large Odeon cinema at the end of Tufnell Park Road where it meets the A1 (Holloway Road). The manor's gateposts survive along the west of Tufnell Park Road. Tufnell petitioned Parliament for authority to develop his estate but the building leases he was granted were left unused; his family had a set of rural estates nationwide. (Note: William's father was Samuel Tufnell of Langleys in Essex. William also inherited Nun Monkton in Yorkshire and estates in Northumberland from his great-uncle, Nathaniel Payler. He also inherited Pleshy from his godfather William Joliffe. These estates went to his older brother John Jolliffe Tufnell of Langleys.)

The Tufnell Park estate passed to his brother George Foster Tufnell, MP for Beverley (died 1798), then to George's son William Tufnell (died 1809), MP for Colchester, who married in 1804 the heiress Mary Carleton (daughter of Thomas Carleton of South Carleton, d.1829). Both are buried at St Mary's Islington, hence her maiden name appearing as two street names in N7. (Note: William was the brother of Lt. Col. John Charles Tufnell of Bath (who leased Lackham House, Lacock, in Wiltshire in 1817), banker, m. 1796 Uliana Ivanova Margaret Fowell (d. 29/1/1848), daughter of John Fowell of Bishopbourne). They had 18 children, one of whom was Edward Wyndam Tufnell, the first Bishop of Brisbane.)

The manor then passed to Henry Tufnell (d. 1854), MP for Ipswich and Devonport, Liberal chief whip whose three marriages included two daughters of earls. (Note: m. 1. (married first) Anne Augusta Wilmot-Horton (daughter of the Governor of Ceylon, d. 17/9/1843), m. 2. 1844 Frances Byng (daughter of Sir John Byng, Earl of Stafford, d. 1846), m. 3. 1848 Lady Anne Primrose (daughter of Earl of Rosebery, d. 1862))

The sparse remnants of the freehold passed to Henry Archibald Tufnell (d. 1898) who died with no children, and then to Lt Col Edward Tufnell (d. 1909) HM Inspector of Schools, Factory Commissioner, Director Greenwich Hospital. (Note: Edward Tufnell (d. 1909) m. 1846 Honoria Mary Macadam (daughter of Col. Macadam Knight of Hanover, d.1877))

=== Development ===
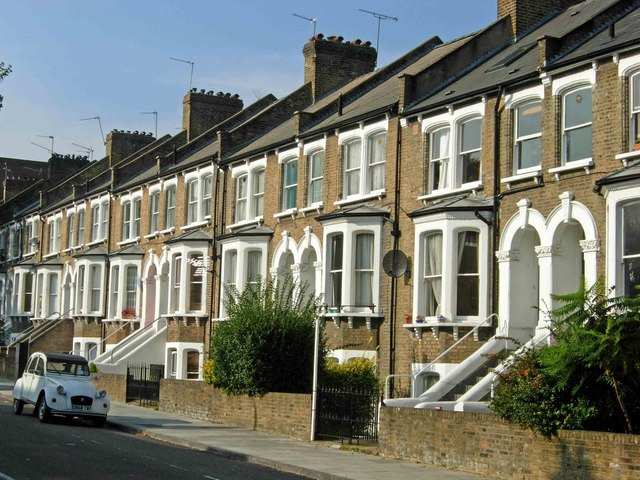
Housing

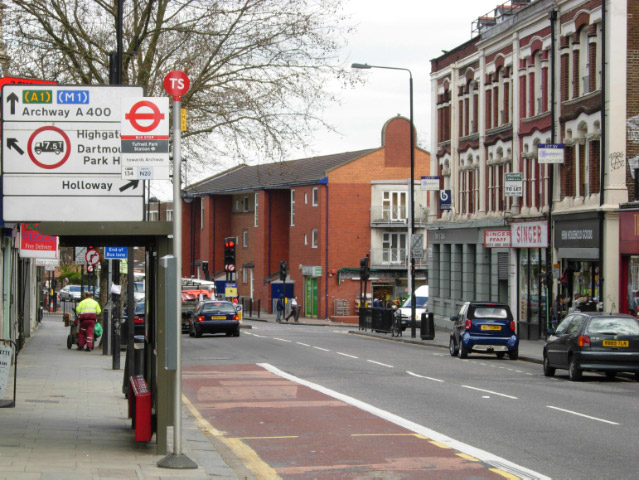
Fortess Road

Serious building began in 1845 with a scheme sponsored by Henry Tufnell and designed by John Shaw Jr., who had laid out the Eton Estate in Chalk Farm. This initial work was largely limited to the area around Carleton Road. In 1865 the scheme was taken up by George Truefitt who developed most of the local villas and St. George's Church (1865), built for Anglican secessionists. The housing stock was of a solid nature, and Tufnell Park kept its good name until the end of the century. Charles Booth in his survey of London Life and Labour reported that the older streets (Anson Road and Carleton Road) housed a mixture of retired merchants and music hall artistes who were rich enough to holiday abroad over winter. He believed that second wave of building around Celia, Hugo, Corinne, Huddleston and Archibald Roads threatened to create a metropolis "from which the rich would soon be going". The private girls' school established at the corner of Carleton and Brecknock Roads ceased in 1878 after many of its pupils drowned in the Princess Alice disaster.

Whereas arterial roads and railway lines sliced through Kentish Town and Camden in the 19th century, one neat east–west double track skirts the district. Junction Road railway station was an 1872–1943 direct link with central London, superseded in 1907 by the building of the tube station Tufnell Park. The shabby genteel reputation of Tufnell Park made it a standard comic reference in the nineteenth and twentieth centuries. George and Weedon Grossmith locate their aspirational Mr Pooter in Tufnell Park (Upper Holloway) in Diary of a Nobody. Julian and Sandy, the camp BBC home service comedians, frequently referenced Tufnell Park as did The Guardian newspaper's Biff cartoon in the 1980s. Between 1999 and 2001, Tufnell Park was the location for Channel 4's comedy drama, Spaced.

== Notable people ==
Notable people who have lived in, were born in, or grew up in Tufnell Park include:

- Julian Barnes, novelist, who has lived in Tufnell Park since 1983
- Siân Berry, politician and environmental campaigner
- Constance Bryer, violinist and suffragette, who lived in Tufnell Park
- Laura Carmichael, actress, who lived in Tufnell Park
- Hugh Cornwell, musician and former frontman of The Stranglers, who was born and grew up in Tufnell Park
- Joe Craig, children's author, who has lived in Tufnell Park
- Gavin Esler, journalist, television presenter and author, who has lived in Tufnell Park
- Sophie Habibis, singer and The X Factor contestant, who lived in Tufnell Park
- Charlie Higson, actor, comedian and author, who has lived in Tufnell Park
- Tessa Jowell, politician, who lived in Tufnell Park
- Jack Karnehm, billiards and snooker player and commentator, who was born in Tufnell Park
- Glenys Kinnock, politician, who lived in Tufnell Park with her husband Neil Kinnock
- Neil Kinnock, former leader of the Labour Party, who lived in Tufnell Park
- Shazad Latif, actor, who grew up in Tufnell Park
- Ralph Lazar, artist, illustrator and author, who lives and works in Tufnell Park
- Damian Lewis, actor, whose family home with Helen McCrory was in Tufnell Park
- Helen McCrory, actress, who lived in Tufnell Park with her husband Damian Lewis
- Roger Michell, film and theatre director, who lived in Tufnell Park
- Robert Muchamore, children's and young-adult author, who was born and grew up in Tufnell Park
- Kwame Nkrumah, first prime minister and president of Ghana, who lived in Tufnell Park while in London in the 1940s
- A. R. Rahman, composer and songwriter, who maintained a home in Tufnell Park while working in London
- Fermin Rocker, painter and illustrator, who lived and worked in Tufnell Park
- Rupert Sanderson, shoe designer, who has lived in Tufnell Park
- Francesca Simon, author of the Horrid Henry series, who lives in Tufnell Park
- Jon Snow, journalist and broadcaster, who has lived in Tufnell Park
- Suggs, singer and frontman of Madness, who has lived in Tufnell Park
- Lisa Swerling, artist, illustrator and author, who lives and works in Tufnell Park

== Transport ==
The focal point of defining the area is Tufnell Park on the Northern line (a London Underground station).

The nearest London Overground and Thameslink stations are the same distance from the centre of the area (as defined by nearest station), in neighbouring districts equally named after their stations:

- Kentish Town (Thameslink, located towards Camden) (also on the Northern Line)
- Upper Holloway (Overground, located towards Crouch End)
- Gospel Oak (Overground, located towards Hampstead)

London Buses routes 4, 134 and 390 as well as Night Bus N20 serve the area.

== Tufnell Park Playing Fields ==
This 5-acre (2.0 ha) space provide Islington's only full-size grass football pitch, shared by clubs. Adjoining this former home ground of Tufnell Park F.C., sectioned off are:

- Cricket nets
- Two tennis courts
- A playground
- A small public open space

== In the arts ==
- George and Weedon Grossmith set their aspirational Mr Pooter in Tufnell Park/Upper Holloway in Diary of a Nobody.
- Kenneth Williams and Hugh Paddick played Julian and Sandy, camp out-of-work actors in the 1965–1968 Round the Horne radio hit who frequently revered Tufnell Park.
- The cult sitcom Spaced, which was created, written by and starred Simon Pegg and Jessica Stevenson, is chiefly set in the area. The distinctive house at the fictional 23 Meteor Street is in fact on Carleton Road and was valued at £4,000,000 in 2018
- Scenes from television series Killing Eve and Fleabag were filmed in the area.
- Many Novels by Charlie Higson are set in the area in and around Tufnell Park and Upper Holloway
