= Earl of Catherlough =

Earl of Catherlough was a title in the Peerage of Ireland.

It was created in 1763 for Robert Knight, 1st Baron Luxborough (1702–1772), Member of Parliament for Great Grimsby, Castle Rising and Milborne Port.

The 1st Earl was the only son of Robert Knight, Cashier of the South Sea Company, by his first wife. He was with his father on his flight to Brabant in February 1721. In 1727, following his return to England, he married Henrietta St John, daughter of Henry St John, 1st Viscount St John, by his 2nd wife Angelica Pelissary. Henrietta was thus half-sister of Henry St John, 1st Viscount Bolingbroke, the son of her father's 1st marriage. He entered parliament in 1734 as M.P. for Great Grimsby, and was at first identified with the Bolingbroke interest. However, with Bolingbroke's return to France and the break-up of his marriage, he became less partisan. On 8 August 1745 he was created Baron Luxborough, of Shannon, in the peerage of Ireland. He gave support to Earl of Bute, Prime Minister between 1762-63. On 14 May 1763 was further raised in the Irish peerage by Bute's successor George Grenville, Prime Minister between 1763–65, being created Viscount Barrells and Earl of Catherlough. All his peerages became extinct on his death in 1772. He left his property to his eldest illegitimate son.

The family seat was at Barrells Hall, Warwickshire.

== Earls of Catherlough (1763) ==
- Robert Knight, 1st Earl of Catherlough (1702–1772)
  - Henry Knight, Viscount Barrells (1728–1762)

== See also ==
- Marquess of Catherlough, created 1715, forfeit 1729
- Viscount Carlow, created 1776, extant
