= Thomas Bennett (MP for Nottinghamshire) =

British Member of Parliament (died 1738)

Thomas Bennett (c. 1674 – 1738) of Welby, Leicestershire, was a British Whig politician who sat in the House of Commons from 1732 to 1738.

Bennett was the eldest son of St John Bennett of Welby and his wife Mary Myddelton, daughter of Sir Thomas Myddelton, 1st Baronet, MP of Chirk, Denbighshire. He matriculated at Christ Church, Oxford on 29 March 1693, aged 18.

Bennett was invited by the Duke of Newcastle to sit as Member of Parliament for Nottinghamshire as a stop-gap, keeping the seat warm for Lord Howe who had been appointed Governor of Barbados. Bennett was chosen because of his close friendship with the Duke of Kingston. He was returned unopposed at a by-election on 30 May 1732 under a compromise agreement with the local Tories. He consistently supported the Government, voting for the Excise Bill. In 1733 he tried, on Newcastle's behalf, to persuade the Duke of Kingston to accept a place as Lord of the bedchamber. However, the Duke's aunt, Lady Mary Wortley Montagu was particularly set against her nephew being brought to court, particularly as a tool of the Duke of Newcastle, and castigated him for his support of Bennett.

Bennett was returned unopposed again for Nottinghamshire at the 1734 British general election, despite some local discontent because he was a Leicestershire man. Lord Howe died of disease in Barbados in 1735.

In the autumn of 1737 Bennett fell ill of a dropsy and died unmarried on 10 June 1738.

Parliament of Great Britain
| Preceded by The Viscount Howe; Sir Robert Sutton | Member of Parliament for Nottinghamshire; 1732–1738; With: William Levinz; William Levinz (junior) | Succeeded by William Levinz (junior); Hon. John Mordaunt |
