= Robert Knight, 1st Earl of Catherlough =

British politician

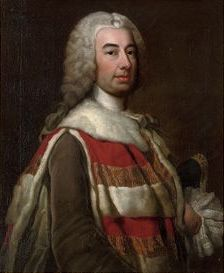
Robert Knight, Baron Luxborough, by George Knapton, 1748/9. He wears the robes of an Irish peer and holds a tricorn hat under his left arm

Robert Knight, 1st Earl of Catherlough, KB, (1702–1772), was a British Member of Parliament for Great Grimsby (1734–41, 1762–68), Castle Rising, Norfolk (1747–54) and Milborne Port, Somerset (1770–72). He became successively Baron Luxborough (1745), Viscount Barrells and Earl of Catherlough (both 1763), all titles within the peerage of Ireland. His wife, Henrietta Lady Luxborough, later became well known as a lady of letters, poet and pioneering landscape gardener.

== Background ==
Luxborough House, Chigwell, Essex, built by Robert Knight, snr. before 1721. Demolished c. 1796. Inscribed: J.Prattent delt. et Sculp. Essex Record Office, 1/Mb 80/1/12

The 1st Earl was born 17 December 1702, the only son by his 1st wife, Martha Powell (1681–1718), of Robert Knight (1675–1744) who became notorious as the cashier of the South Sea Company partly responsible for the "South Sea Bubble", who absconded to France with a fortune and set up as a banker in Paris. He built Luxborough House in Chigwell, Essex, on the manor of Luxborough which he had purchased. His estates were seized by the South Sea Company, which sold Luxborough to Sir Joseph Eyles (d.1740), Alderman & Sheriff of the City of London & MP for Devizes (1724–5) & Southwark (1727–30). He also had two daughters. Catherine (d. 15 October 1736) married 1 May 1727 John Page, of Donnington, Sussex, MP for Chichester, by whom she had a daughter, Catherine, who d. unm. in 1795. Margaretta (d. 1 May 1739) married 28 February 1731 Hon. Morgan Vane, son of 2nd Baron Barnard of Barnard Castle, Durham. His funerary monument, a free-standing urn on a pedestal, can be seen in St Peter's Church, Wootton Wawen, Warwickshire.

== Education ==
He was educated at Wadham College, Oxford, where he matriculated on 22 June 1719. He entered the Inner Temple in 1719.

== Career ==
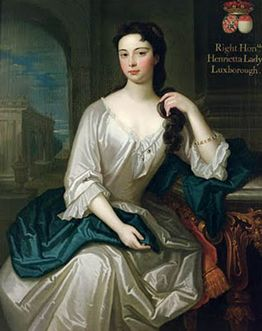
Henrietta, Lady Luxborough. By unknown artist

He was with his father on his flight to Brabant in February 1721. On 10 June 1727, following his return to England, he married Henrietta St John (15 July 1699 – 26 March 1756), daughter of Henry St John, 1st Viscount St John, of Lydiard Park, Swindon, by his second wife Angelica Pelissary, daughter of Georges Pelissary, treasurer of the navy to King Louis XIV. Henrietta was thus half-sister of the highly influential Henry St John, 1st Viscount Bolingbroke, the son of her father's first marriage.

In 1730 he purchased Barrells Hall, Ullenhall, Warwickshire, the ancestral home of the Knight family, from his second cousin Raleigh Knight. He entered parliament in 1734 as 2nd M.P. for the borough of Great Grimsby, and was at first identified with the Bolingbroke interest. John Page, MP for Grimsby in 1727, wrote in 1762 concerning Knight that his interest in Grimsby:

"… was stronger there than any man's because they have had more of his money than anybody's and he has always been punctual to all his engagements with them and they with him".

On the break-up of his marriage before 1736 and following Bolingbroke's return to France, he became less partisan, but held his seat until 1741. In 1740, on the death of Sir Joseph Eyles, Robert Knight snr. had repurchased Luxborough House, to which his son succeeded in 1744. On 8 August 1745 he was created Baron Luxborough, of Shannon, in the peerage of Ireland. In 1747 he won the seat, as 1st member, of Castle Rising, Norfolk, which he retained until 1754. In 1749, he sold the estate at Luxborough to a London merchant named James Crokatt, who was in the Carolina trade. He became Agent for the Province. He was instrumental in obtaining the Royal Charter for the incorporation of the Charleston Library Society in 1755. whose heirs sold it to Sir Edward Walpole, K.B. (d.1784), younger son of the Prime Minister Sir Robert Walpole. In March 1761 he obtained the position of Recorder of Grimsby. In the general election of 1761 Luxborough procured the return of his son Henry as MP for Great Grimsby, as 1st member. On the sudden death of his son in August 1762, Luxborough decided to stand himself in the resultant by-election, and was returned unopposed, holding the seat until 1768. He explained his decision to stand thus: "As money can be no consideration in my unhappy situation and as possibly hereafter it may be an amusement to be in Parliament". He gave support to the Earl of Bute, Prime Minister between 1762-63. On 14 May 1763 he was further raised in the Irish peerage by Bute's successor George Grenville, Prime Minister between 1763–65, becoming Viscount Barrells of Co. Catherlough and Earl of Catherlough. In 1770 he stood successfully as 2nd member in the by-election for Milborne Port, Somerset, which seat he held until his death on 30 March 1772, aged 69. He was created Knight of the Bath (KB) 18 May 1770.

== First marriage ==
He banished his wife Henrietta St John to Barrells Hall in 1736 as punishment for a romantic indiscretion. Horace Walpole's correspondence suggests she was caught by her husband in flagrante delicto with her doctor, whilst other sources add a further lover in the form of a young cleric named John Dalton (1709–1763). Dalton had been employed as tutor to the children of Henrietta's close friend Frances Thynne (1699–1754), known until 1748 as Lady Hertford, wife of Algernon Seymour, 7th Duke of Somerset. Dalton went on to become prebendary of Worcester Cathedral and rector of St Mary-at-Hill Church, London, as his large funerary slab in the crypt of the cathedral reveals. He was also noted for his poetic works. As Henrietta, Lady Luxborough, she was one of the first to establish a ferme ornée and is credited by the OED with at least the first recorded use, if not the invention of the word "shrubbery". She was a prominent member of the Warwickshire Coterie, a group of poet friends including the poet William Shenstone, who had developed his own ferme ornée at The Leasowes in Halesowen, Shropshire.

== Second marriage ==
After his wife Henrietta's death on 26 March 1756, Luxborough began to live at Barrells and married secondly on 18 June 1756 Lady le Quesne. She was the widow of Sir John le Quesne (d.1741), Alderman of London, née Mary Knight, from Hampshire, who provided a dowry of £20,000 to her first husband. She was probably a member of the prominent Knight family, seemingly of no relation, of Chawton House, Hampshire, which later adopted Edward Austen, the brother of Jane Austen, who became heir of the family assuming the surname Knight. The Registers of St Peter le Poer church records the marriage in April 1738, by the Bishop of Norwich, of Sir John Le Quesne, Alderman of London, with Miss Mary Knight, of Hampshire, a lady with a dowry of twenty thousand pounds. Le Quesne was a huguenot, and served from 1736 as director of the French Hospital, founded at Rochester in 1718. He was a sheriff of the City of London in 1739 and died in 1741. A Silver tea kettle was made for the 1738 marriage of Sir John Le Quesne to Mary Knight by the Huguenot silversmith Paul de Lamerie(d. 1751), now in the collection of the Courtauld Institute, London. It displays the acorn arms of Le Quesne, which name derives from the French Chene, oak. William Randolph Hearst expressed his attraction to this object. Luxborough however became involved in an affair with Jane Davies, the daughter of a labourer in Henley-in-Arden, which resulted in several illegitimate children. He was unable to marry her because his wife, Lady Le Quesne, refused to release him. Mary died in 1795 and was buried in Hampton, Middlesex.

== Death and burial ==
The Earl died on 30 March 1772, aged 69, and was buried at Ullenhall. His will dated 11 February 1772 was proved on 10 April 1772. All his peerages became extinct on his death on 30 March 1772, his son Hon. Henry Knight (1728–62), having predeceased him.

== Succession ==
=== Legitimate progeny ===
Hon. Henry Knight (1728–1762). Titled Henry Knight Aetat (15?), 1743/4(?). English School

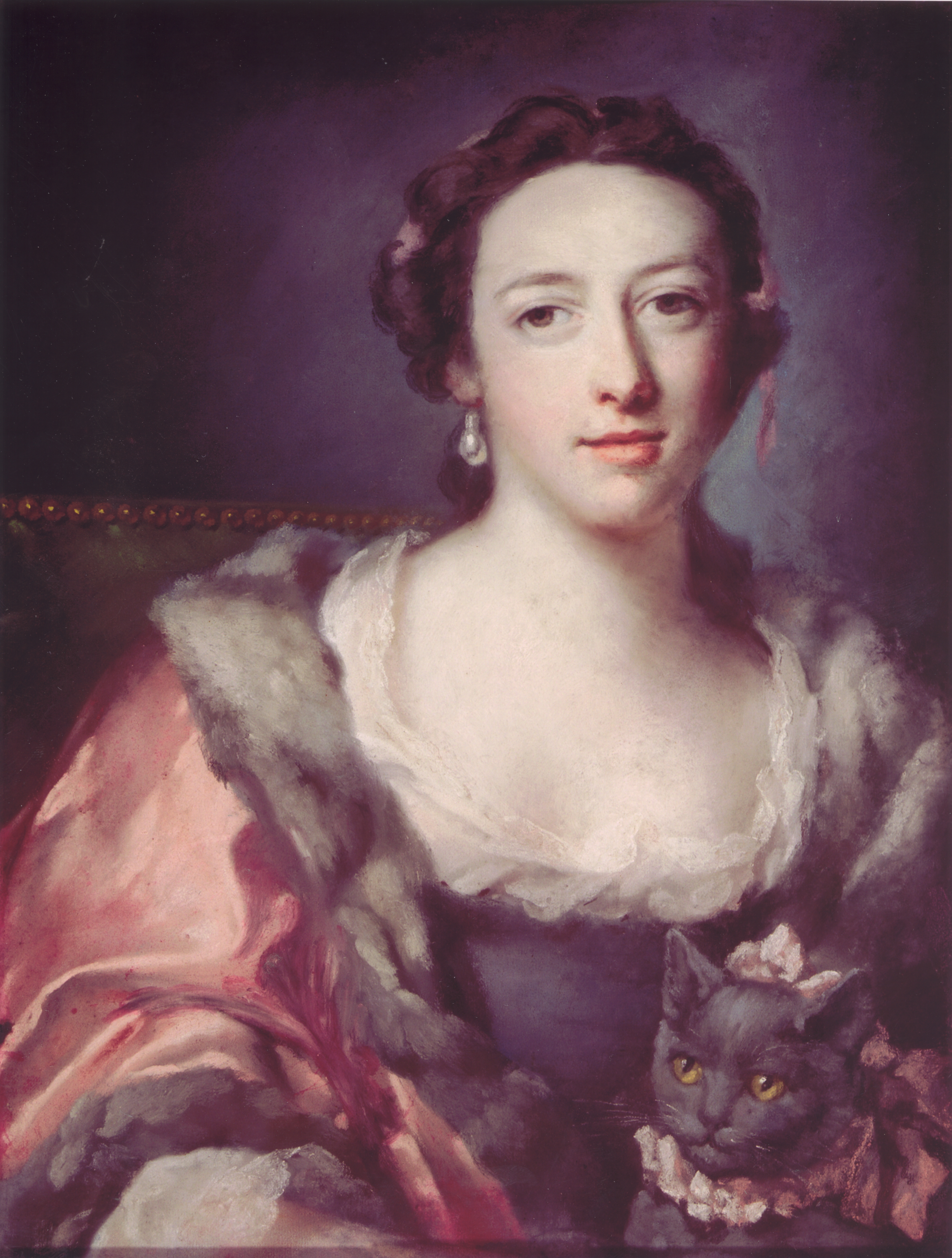
Henrietta Child, née Knight, by Francis Cotes. Collection of Lydiard Park

- Hon. Henry Knight (25 December 1728 – 15 August 1762). Henry served as MP for Grimsby 1761 to his death on 15 August 1762, aged 34. He had married on 21 June 1750 Frances Heath (d. 2/1782), da. of Thomas Heath of Stansted Mountfitchet, Essex, MP for Harwich in 1714/15, son of William Heath, a captain in the East India Company, which marriage was without issue. There is no record of his having spoken in the House. He was buried at Ullenhall.
- Henrietta Knight (1729–1763). His only daughter Henrietta, who also predeceased him, married firstly Charles Wymondsold, son of Matthew Wymondsold of East Lockinge and Putney, a speculator in the South Sea Company. Having run away from him, and been divorced in 1754, Henrietta married secondly the Hon. Josiah Child (d. 1760), an officer in the Royal Navy, the younger son of Richard Child, 1st Earl Tylney, of Wanstead House, Essex, son of the very wealthy Sir Josiah Child, governor of the East India Company. She gave birth to their son, Josiah, shortly before her divorce came through. The younger Josiah was brought up by Lord Tylney, but died in Florence in 1774. Mrs Child then had an affair with Louis-Alexandre de Grimoard de Beauvoir, Comte de Roure and died giving birth to their son.

=== Illegitimate progeny ===
- Robert Knight (1768–1855). Lord Catherlough's illegitimate son by Jane Davies took the surname of Knight and inherited his property. On the death of Robert Knight in 1855, the Reverend Henry Charles Knight (b. 1813), who claimed to be his son by Hon. Frances Dormer, daughter of Charles, 5th Baron Dormer, but who had been disowned by Robert, attempted to obtain the Barrells estate as his inheritance, against Charles Raleigh Knight, Mr Knight's nephew. The resulting legal dispute was settled by the sale and splitting up of Barrells in 1856. Henry bought parts of the estate whilst the remainder was sold to Mr William Newton, a Birmingham merchant. Most of the heirlooms however descended in the family of Mr Knight's daughter, Georgiana, wife of Edward Bolton King, of Umberslade, Warwickshire.

== Barrells Hall ==
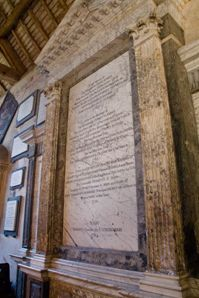
Funerary monument in Wootton Wawen Church erected by the Earl in memory of his legitimate children, who both predeceased him

Barrells Hall is situated in Ullenhall, Warwickshire. The earliest mention of Barrells was a reference to a Richard Barel in 1405. In 1554 the estate was purchased by Robert Knight of Beoley, 4 miles west of Ullenhall, and remained in the Knight family until 1856. An inventory taken in 1652 shows that it was then an ordinary farmhouse, and a member of the Knight family appeared in the 1682 Heralds' Visitation of Warwick. The future 1st Earl purchased Barrells from a cousin in 1730. When Henrietta St John was banished to Barrells in 1736 it was still a relatively simple house, in very poor condition. When his son married in 1791 he commissioned the Italian architect Joseph Bonomi the Elder to build an imposing extension, which thereafter became the main house.

== Luxborough House ==
Luxborough House stood about 1 mile from Chigwell church on the road south-west to Woodford. Following the death of Sir Edward Hughes, KB, in 1794, it was demolished some time after 1796 by his widow.

Parliament of Great Britain
Preceded by George Monson; John Page	Member of Parliament for Great Grimsby; 1734 – 1747; With: Sir Robert Sutton to 1741; William Lock from 1741	Succeeded by John Gore; William Lock
Peerage of Ireland
New creation	Earl of Catherlough; 1763–1772	Extinct
New creation	Baron Luxborough; 1745–1772	Extinct
