= Waller Bacon =

British lawyer and Whig politician

Waller Bacon (c. 1669 – 1734), of Earlham Hall, near Norwich, was a British lawyer and Whig politician who sat in the House of Commons for 24 years between 1705 and 1734. He was active in drafting bills in Parliament, possibly on the strength of his legal background.

== Early life ==
Bacon was the only surviving son of Francis Bacon of Gray's Inn and his wife Elizabeth Waller, daughter of Thomas Waller of St Andrew, Holborn, Middlesex. and Earlham. In 1679 he succeeded his father. He was admitted at Gray's Inn in 1679 and matriculated at Christ Church, Oxford on. 23 February 1686, aged 16. In 1693 he was called to the bar. He married (with £2,000), Mary Porter daughter of Richard Porter of Framlingham, Suffolk on 4 April 1695. She died in 1701 and he married as his second wife, by settlement of 28 August 1703, Frances, who was probably the daughter of Rev. Edward Nosworthy, rector of Diptford, Devon. He leased the Earlham estate from his mother, and succeeded to this and other property on his mother’ death in 1704.

== Career ==
Bacon was appointed a deputy-lieutenant for Norwich by December 1702. At the 1705 English general election, he stood at Norwich on the Whig interest with the backing of Lord Townshend, but there was a double return, and he was not seated as Member of Parliament until 6 December 1705. He voted for the Court candidate for Speaker on 25 October 1705. In January 1706 he was on a committee to draft a bill to regulate duties on coal imports into Great Yarmouth, following popular pressure from Norwich and Norfolk.. In February he reported a petition of some army officers for relief and was ordered to bring in a bill to this end. He voted in February 1706 for the Court over the ‘place clause’ in the regency bill. In December, he was appointed to draft another bill on Yarmouth coal duties, which he brought successfully through the House. In February 1707 he reported another petition of army officers for arrears of pay, and introduced a bill in March to state the accounts of the regiments concerned. He was returned again at the 1708 British general election. He was appointed in January 1709 to a drafting committee for a bill to continue the Wymondham–Attleborough Road Act. In 1709 he voted for the naturalization of the Palatines. In January 1710 he helped to progress a bill to regulate hackney coaches, and in March reported a private estate bill. He voted for the impeachment of Dr Sacheverell in 1710. He became a bencher of his Inn in 1709. He was defeated in contests at Norwich in 1710 and 1713.

Bacon came back into Parliament for Norwich at the 1715 British general election. He showed himself to be a loyal supporter of Walpole. In 1714 he obtained a place as Commissioner for victualling, which he gave up in 1717 to follow Walpole into opposition. He became a Freeman of Norwich in 1718. In 1721, following petitions from wool manufacturers, including those of Norwich, he introduced a bill, which became law, to prohibit wearing calico. After Walpole’s return to power he secured another place in 1722 as commissary of musters and stores in Minorca. At the 1722 British general election, he was returned unopposed for Norwich. He was returned again in 1727 and 1734. He voted regularly with the Government.

== Death and legacy ==
Waller died on 11 November 1734, leaving two surviving sons.

Parliament of England
Preceded by Thomas Blofield; Thomas Palgrave	Member of Parliament for Norwich; 1705–1707; With: John Chambers	Succeeded by Parliament of Great Britain
Parliament of Great Britain
Preceded by Parliament of England	Member of Parliament for Norwich; 1707– 1710; With: John Chambers	Succeeded by Robert Bene; Richard Berney
Preceded by Robert Bene; Richard Berney	Member of Parliament for Norwich; 1715– 1734; With: Robert Brightiffe; Horatio Walpole 1734	Succeeded by Thomas Vere; Horatio Walpole
