= George Monson (died 1739) =

British lawyer and politician

George Monson (c. 1693–1739) was a British lawyer and politician who sat in the House of Commons from 1727 to 1734.

Monson was the second son of George Monson of Broxbourne, Hertfordshire and his wife Anne Wren, daughter of Charles Wren of the Isle of Ely. He was admitted at Gray's Inn on 2 February 1708 and at Corpus Christi College, Cambridge on 25 June 1708. He was called to the bar in 1720.

Monson was a practising lawyer and was returned in a contest as Member of Parliament for Great Grimsby at the 1727 British general election. He voted consistently with the Administration. He did not stand again at the 1734 British general election.

Monson became a bencher of his Inn in 1736. He died unmarried on 7 July 1739. He was the brother of Charles and John Monson, 1st Baron Monson.

Parliament of Great Britain
Preceded by Benjamin Collyer; Charles Pelham	Member of Parliament for Great Grimsby; 1727– 1734; With: John Page	Succeeded by Sir Robert Sutton; Robert Knight
