= Biff (cartoon) =

Biff is a British cartoon strip, created since the mid-1970s by Chris Garratt and Mick Kidd. The first Biff collection was published in 1982. The strip was first published in the newspaper The Guardian in 1985. Biff Weekend ran there weekly for 20 years. The comic originated in a series of single-panel postcards before evolving into multi-panel comic strips. It has also been published in the magazine Viz, fRoots and since 2001 in the magazine of the Rough Guides.

The cartoons are notable for their absurd, ironic, satirical and metafictional edge.

== History ==
Chris Garratt and Mick Kidd met at grammar school in the 1950s and have collaborated on Biff since the mid-1970s. Chris Garratt creates the artwork (a mixture of collage, found images, tracings and original drawings) and Mick Kidd is responsible for the text. Kidd lives in London and Garratt in the Scilly Isles. They have created their strips and other artwork over the last 30 years by means of phone, post, email and occasional meetings.

In 2007 Chris Garratt introduced a retrospective of Biff work in these terms:

Raised on a diet of Hymns Ancient and Modern, Sartre and Joe Meek hits, Goldfish Virgins of the dodgems, Intrepid Riders of the Waltzers, wags of youth club literati and pioneers of skiffle, the Biff boys belong to a generation that said goodbye to trilby hats, pipes and National Service and ushered in the Golden Age of Rhythm & Blues, Existentialism and Vietnam. Their early work, retrospectively recognised as anglicised Situationism with its artless articulation of image and text détournement, montaging comic strip and philosophy, angst-riddled soliloquies and cowboy drawls, featured prominently in the sprawling publications and smudged ink mags of the Counter Culture.

Holding up a cracked and peeling mirror to a cracked and peeling generation of new adults who exchanged WRP for SDP, beanbags for Habitat and IKEA, Biff eschewed the tedious route of “political satire” and its toothless ranting-to-the-converted in favour of a bewildered but first-hand commentary on the mapless aspirations, pretensions and farcical antics of the baby boomer meritocracy. Threaded through this nonsensical catalogue of faux-academic posturing, management-speak, Baudrillardian ramblings and psychobabble set in the deathly milieu of wicker furniture and avocado dips was a continuing fascination for new frontiers in astronomy, particle physics, psychology and the arts, deliberately colliding such “serious” endeavours with the loonier fringes of self improvement such as cushion-bashing psychotherapy, astrology and sweat lodges.

Biff’s 20 year tenure in “The Guardian” effectively charted the Rise and Fall of the not-so-angry young things as they shambled from Grosvenor Square to Hay-on-Wye, from the Ugly Rumours to Iraq, into the present wilderness of collective paranoia.

They are still working and contribute to BBC History magazines with ‘A Biff History of Exploration’ and ‘A Biff History of The Media’, People Management with ‘Human Resources’, Latest Art with ‘Biff Art’ and Rough News with ‘The 6 Ages of Travel’.

== Quote ==
Biff quotes have a way of sticking in the mind. Is it ironical cultural commentary which pioneered a unique style of visual ‘sampling’ before the word had even been invented? Or is it Chris Garratt and Mick Kidd, two mad old farts from Leicestershire, locked in a long-distance comedy partnership since childhood? In 1985 they got their big break, standing in for Posy Simmonds on the women's page of the Guardian. They stayed on after Posy’s return for a further twenty years. Then, as foretold by the sudden appearance of the Hale-Bopp comet in the western sky, Blairism began to bite. They were downsized, monochromed, shrunk and eventually berlinered out of the paper altogether. But fear not for their work continues in other magazines - so as their homepage advises ‘Relax and float downstream’. Steve Bell, 2007

== Books ==
- The Essential Biff by Chris Garratt and Mick Kidd, Pavement Press, 1982
- The Rainy Day Biff by Chris Garratt and Mick Kidd, Pavement Press, 1983
- Desert Island Biff by Chris Garratt and Mick Kidd, Corgi, 1985
- Sincerely Yours, Biff by Chris Garratt and Mick Kidd, Corgi, 1986
- File Under Biff by Chris Garratt and Mick Kidd, Mandarin, 1988
- Faxes From Biff by Chris Garratt and Mick Kidd, Mandarin, 1990
- Best of Biff by Chris Garratt and Mick Kidd, Impact Books, 1990
- Life on the Floor and Other Mattresses by Chris Garratt and Mick Kidd, Impact Books, 1993
- How to be a Genius by Chris Garratt, Mick Kidd and David Stafford, Methuen Books, 1994
- Biff: The Missing Years by Chris Garratt and Mick Kidd, Icon Books, 1996

== See also ==
- Tufnell Park
