= Charles Pelham (died 1763) =

British landowner and Tory politician

Member of Parliament for Beverley
- In office 1738–1741 Serving with Ellerker Bradshaw, William Strickland, Sir William Codrington, Bt
- Preceded by: Sir Charles Hotham, Bt; Ellerker Bradshaw
- Succeeded by: John Tufnell; Sir William Codrington, Bt

Member of Parliament for Beverley
- In office 1727–1734 Serving with Ellerker Bradshaw, Sir Charles Hotham, Bt
- Preceded by: Sir Charles Hotham, Bt; Michael Newton
- Succeeded by: Sir Charles Hotham, Bt; Ellerker Bradshaw

Member of Parliament for Great Grimsby
- In office 1722–1727 Serving with Benjamin Collyer
- Preceded by: Arthur Moore; Joseph Banks
- Succeeded by: John Page; George Monson

Personal details
- Born: c. 1679
- Died: 6 February 1763 (aged 83–84)
- Spouses: Anne Gore (m. 1714; died 1739) Mary Vyner (after 1739)
- Relations: Michael Warton (grandfather); Charles Anderson-Pelham, 1st Baron Yarborough (grand-nephew)
- Parent(s): Charles Pelham; Elizabeth Warton

Charles Pelham (c. 1679 – 6 February 1763) of Brocklesby, Lincolnshire, was a British landowner and Tory politician who sat in the House of Commons for 28 years between 1722 and 1754.

== Early life ==
Pelham was born in c. 1679 into a junior branch of the Pelhams of Sussex. He was the eldest son of Charles Pelham of Brocklesby and his wife Elizabeth Warton, daughter of Michael Warton, MP of Beverley, Yorkshire. His father died in 1692, and he succeeded to his estates. In 1725, as co-heir to Beverley estates of his uncle, Sir Michael Warton, MP for Beverley.

== Career ==
Pelham was returned as a Tory Member of Parliament for Great Grimsby at the 1722 general election. He inherited property from his uncle Sir Michael Warton in 1725 and at the 1727 general election he was returned instead as MP for Beverley. In Parliament he voted against the Government. He was defeated significantly at the 1734 general election, but was elected for Beverley again at a by-election on 2 February 1738. On the motion for Walpole's dismissal in February 1741, he was one of the Tories who withdrew before the division. He was returned top of the poll at the 1741 general election, and was returned unopposed in 1747. He retired at the 1754 general election.

== Personal life ==
He married Anne Gore daughter of Sir William Gore, Lord Mayor of London, on 29 June 1714. His first wife died on 8 March 1739, and he married Mary Vyner, daughter of Robert Vyner of Gautby, Lincolnshire.

He died without issue on 6 February 1763, and his estates passed to his grand-nephew, Charles Anderson, who added the surname Pelham. He was created the 1st Baron Yarborough in 1794.

Parliament of Great Britain
Preceded by Arthur Moore; Joseph Banks	Member of Parliament for Great Grimsby; 1722–1727; With: Benjamin Collyer	Succeeded by John Page; George Monson
Preceded by Sir Charles Hotham, Bt; Michael Newton	Member of Parliament for Beverley; 1727–1734; With: Ellerker Bradshaw 1727-1729; Sir Charles Hotham, Bt 1729-1734	Succeeded by Sir Charles Hotham, Bt; Ellerker Bradshaw
Preceded by Sir Charles Hotham, Bt; Ellerker Bradshaw	Member of Parliament for Beverley; 1738–1754; With: Ellerker Bradshaw 1738-1741; William Strickland 1741-1747; Sir William Codrington, Bt 1747-1754	Succeeded by John Tufnell; Sir William Codrington, Bt
