= John Page (politician, died 1779) =

English Member of Parliament

Member of Parliament
- In office 1741–1768
- Preceded by: James Brudenell; Thomas Yates
- Succeeded by: William Keppel; Thomas Conolly
- Constituency: Chichester
- In office 1727–1734
- Preceded by: Benjamin Colyer; Charles Pelham
- Succeeded by: Robert Sutton; Robert Knight
- Constituency: Great Grimsby

Personal details
- Born: 1696
- Died: 1779 (aged 82–83)
- Spouse(s): Catherine Anne (m. 1741)
- Children: 2

John Page (1696? – 1779) of Watergate House, near Chichester, Sussex was an English Member of Parliament.

He was the son of Edward Page of Chichester and began his working life as an employee of the South Sea Company. From 1730 to 1732 he was a Director of the East India Company.

He entered Parliament in 1727 as the member for Great Grimsby, sitting until 1734. In the next Parliament (1934) he stood for Chichester but came bottom of the poll. In 1741, however, he was elected for the borough, sitting in several successive Parliaments until 1768.

In 1733 he became a trustee for the newly formed colony of Georgia on the east coast of America.

He died in 1779. He had married twice; firstly Catherine, the daughter of Robert Knight, cashier of the South Sea Co., with whom he had a daughter and secondly, in 1741, Anne, the daughter and heiress of Francis Soane of Stockbridge, near Chichester, with whom he had a second daughter.

== See also ==
- Trustees for the Establishment of the Colony of Georgia in America

Parliament of Great Britain
Preceded by Benjamin Colyer; Charles Pelham	Member of Parliament for Great Grimsby; 1727–1734; With: George Monson	Succeeded by Robert Sutton; Robert Knight
Preceded by James Brudenell; Thomas Yates	Member of Parliament for Chichester; 1741–1768; With: James Brudenell (1741–46); George Keppel (1746–55); Augustus Keppel (1755–61; Lord George Lennox (1761–67); William Kepple (1767–68)	Succeeded by William Keppel; Thomas Conolly
