= Robert Brightiffe =

English lawyer and Whig politician

Robert Brightiffe or Britiffe (c. 1666 – 22 September 1749), of Baconsthorpe, Norfolk, was an English lawyer and Whig politician. He sat in the House of Commons from 1715 to 1734 and served as recorder of Norwich in 1737–1743.

== Background and education ==
Brightiffe was born at Baconsthorpe, Norfolk, the son of Edmund Brightiffe, gentleman, and his wife Mary Longe, daughter of Robert Longe of Spixworth, Norfolk. Brightiffe was educated at Baconsthorpe, at Holt School and in Norwich. He was admitted to Gonville and Caius College, Cambridge on 24 March 1680, at the age of 16. He subsequently entered the Middle Temple on 29 May 1682, and was called to the Bar in 1688.

Brightiffe married Judith Edgar, daughter of Henry Edgar of Eye, Suffolk; she died in 1705. In 1704 Brightiffe was appointed Recorder of Lynn and held the post until 1730. He married as his second wife Elizabeth Rant, daughter of Sir William Rant of Thorpe Market, Norfolk; she died in 1712. As a Norwich lawyer, he acted as legal adviser to the Townshend and Walpole families.

== Political career ==
Brightiffe was returned as Whig Member of Parliament for Norwich at the 1715 general election. He followed his patrons into opposition between 1717 and 1720, and thereafter voted with the Government. He was returned again at the elections of 1722 and 1727. He retired in favour of "old" Horatio Walpole at the 1734 British general election. He was recorder of Norwich from 1737 to 1743.

== Later life and legacy ==
Some time after 1735, Brightiffe married as his third wife Elizabeth Tanner, widow of Dr Thomas Tanner, Bishop of St Asaph and daughter of Thomas Strotton of Little Melton, Norfolk. He died on 22 September 1749, leaving his property to his daughters, one by each of his first two marriages. One married John Hobart, 1st Earl of Buckinghamshire, and the other, Sir William Morden Harbord, 1st Baronet.

== Gallery ==
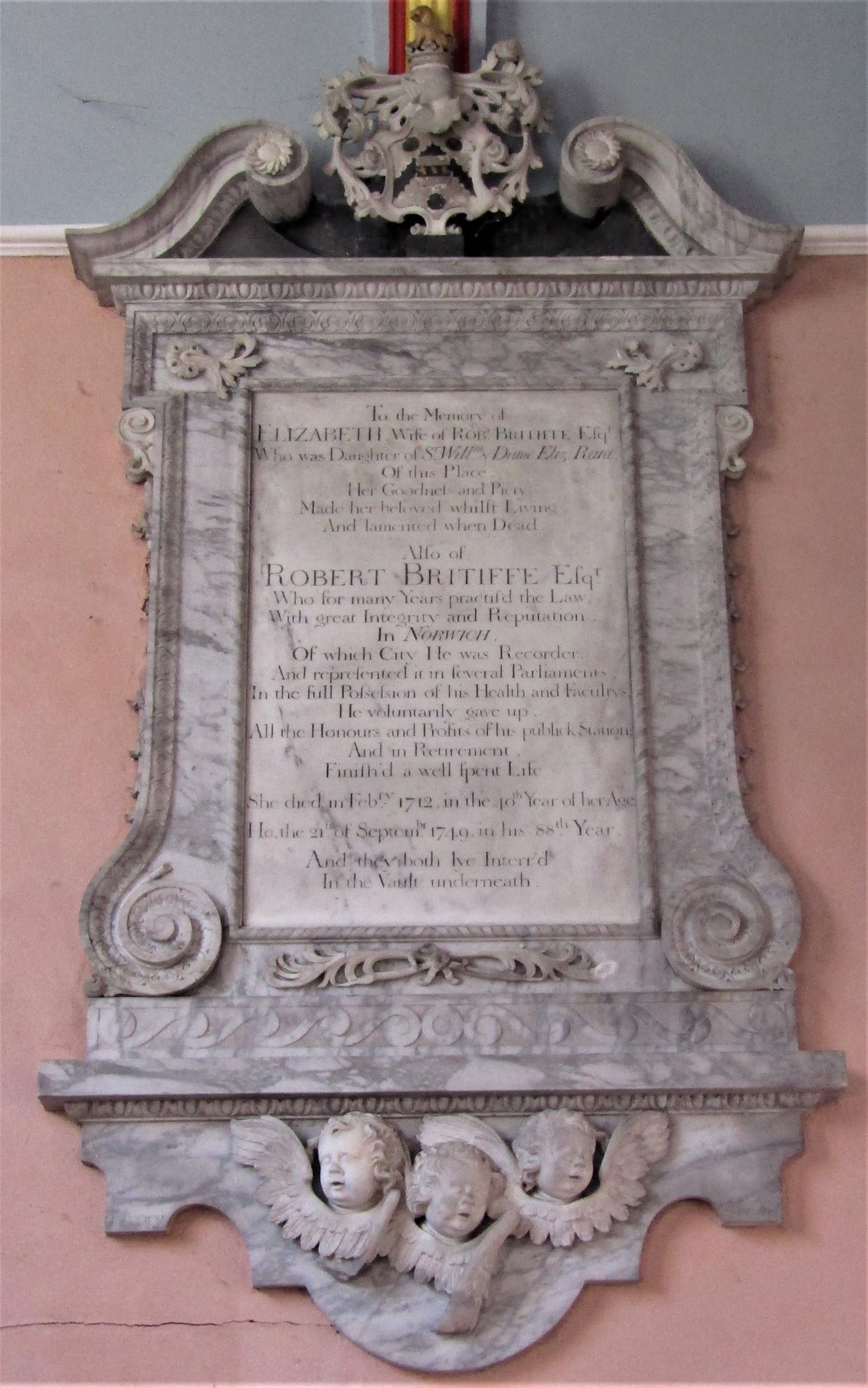
Memorial in Thorpe Market, Norfolk

Parliament of Great Britain
Preceded by Robert Bene; Richard Berney	Member of Parliament for Norwich; 1715–1734; With: Waller Bacon 1715–1734	Succeeded by Waller Bacon; Horatio Walpole
