= Michael Warton (died 1688) =

English politician

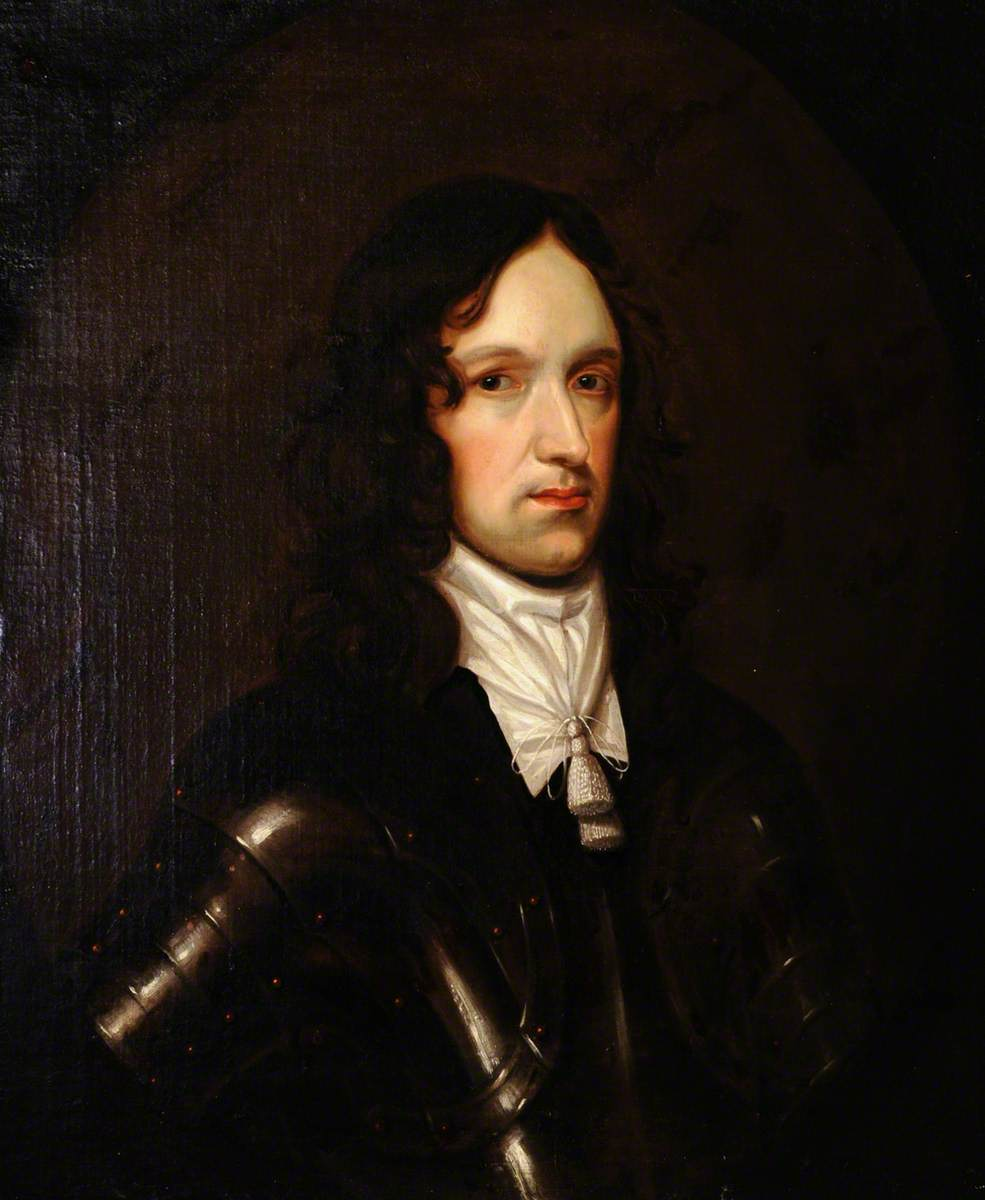
Michael Warton Portrait

Michael Warton DL (1623 – 9 August 1688) was an English politician who sat in the House of Commons from 1660. He supported the Royalist cause in the English Civil War.

Warton was the son of Michael Warton of Beverley and his wife Catherine Maltby, daughter of Christopher Maltby of Maltby, Yorkshire. He was baptised on 27 April 1623. He was educated at Beverley Grammar School and at St John's College, Cambridge in 1640, and was a student of Gray's Inn in 1640. He served in the Royalist army until the Battle of Marston Moor and paid £1,600 on estate of his father for delinquency. He succeeded to the estates of his grandfather in 1655.

In 1660, Warton was elected Member of Parliament for Beverley at a by-election to the Convention Parliament. He was J.P. for East Riding of Yorkshire from July 1660-87 and Deputy Lieutenant for the East Rising from August 1660 to 1680. He was commissioner for assessment for the East Riding from August 1660 to 1680 and commissioner for sewers in September 1660. In 1661 he was re-elected MP for Beverley in the Cavalier Parliament. He was colonel of foot militia from 1661 to 1686. He was commissioner for corporations for Yorkshire from 1662 to 1663, commissioner for assessment for Lindsey, Lincolnshire from 1663 to 1669, commissioner for oyer and terminer for the Northern circuit in 1665 and commissioner for recusants for the East. Riding in 1675. He was re-elected MP for Beverley in the two elections of 1679 and in February 1680 he was seen in London coffee houses speaking against the Duke of York and making his audience drink to the Duke of Monmouth. He was re-elected MP for Beverley in 1681 and 1685.

Warton died in London at the age of about 65 and was buried at St John's, Beverley. He was a generous benefactor to the town of Beverley and founded of a hospital there.

Warton married Susan Poulett, daughter of John Poulett, 1st Baron Poulett of Hinton St. George in about 1646 and had four sons and three daughters. He was the brother of Sir Ralph Warton.

Parliament of England
Preceded by Hugh Bethall; Sir John Hotham, 2nd Baronet	Member of Parliament for Beverley; 1660–1688; With: Sir John Hotham, 2nd Baronet 1660–1685; Ralph Warton	Succeeded by Sir John Hotham, 2nd Baronet; Sir Michael Warton
