= Richard Berney =

English politician

Richard Berney (1674 – c. 1738), of Langley, Norfolk, was an English politician.

He studied law at Gray's Inn and was Recorder of Norwich from 1727 to his death.

He was a member (MP) of the parliament of Great Britain for Norwich 1710–1715.
