= Sir Michael Newton, 4th Baronet =

British landowner and politician (1695–1743)

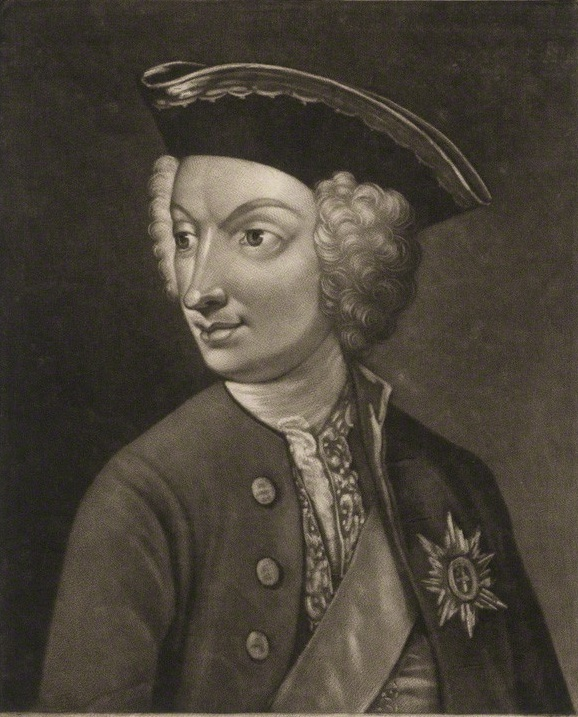
1774 portrait of Newton

Newton's coat of arms

Sir Michael Newton, 4th Baronet, KB (c. 1695 – 6 April 1743) was a British landowner and politician who represented Beverley and Grantham in the House of Commons of Great Britain from 1722 to 1743. Newton was the only son of Sir John Newton, 3rd Baronet, and his wife Susanna Warton, daughter of Michael Warton of Beverley, and sister of Sir Michael Warton.

The Newton family fortune derived originally from the legacy of a Grantham moneylender. Newton also inherited a significant fortune from his maternal uncle, Sir Michael Warton, whom he succeeded as Member of Parliament (MP) for Beverly at the 1722 British general election. He was one of the wealthy commoners who were made knights of the new Order of the Bath by Sir Robert Walpole in 1725, but in Parliament Newton consistently voted against Walpole's government. Newton was returned as MP for Grantham at the 1727 British general election and was returned again in 1734 and 1741.

Newton lived at Culverthorpe Hall, Lincolnshire. He was chief mourner at the 1727 funeral, held at Westminster Abbey, of the eminent scientist Sir Isaac Newton, who was Sir Michael's third cousin once removed. He also cultivated horse breeding and racing. In 1730 he married Margaret, Countess of Coningsby, daughter of Thomas Coningsby, 1st Earl Coningsby. The couple had a son and daughter, but the son died in infancy and after Sir Michael's death on 25 March 1743, the baronetcy became extinct.

Parliament of Great Britain
| Preceded by Sir Michael Warton; Sir Charles Hotham, Bt. | Member of Parliament for Beverley; 1722–1727; With: Sir Charles Hotham, Bt. 1722–1723; Sir Charles Hotham, Bt. 1723–1727 | Succeeded by Charles Pelham; Ellerker Bradshaw |
| Preceded by Francis Fisher; Sir John Brownlow | Member of Parliament for Grantham; 1727–1743; With: Sir John Brownlow 1727–1741; Marquess of Granby 1741–1743 | Succeeded by Sir John Cust, Bt. Marquess of Granby |
Baronetage of England
| Preceded by John Newton | Baronet (of Barrs Court); 1734–1743 | Extinct |
