= Ellerker Bradshaw =

British politician

Ellerker Bradshaw (1 December 1680 – 1742), of Risby, Yorkshire, was a British politician who sat in the House of Commons between 1727 and 1741.

Bradshaw was the eldest son of Sir James Bradshaw of Bromborough, Cheshire and his wife Dorothy Elleker, daughter of John Ellerker of Risby, through whom he acquired the estate of Risby, three miles from Beverley. Bradshaw married Rebecca Northey, daughter of Sir Edward Northey.

Bradshaw stood unsuccessfully for Beverley at the 1722 British general election and at a by-election on 31 January 1723. He was returned as Member of Parliament for Beverley at the 1727 British general election, but was unseated on petition on 8 March 1729. His agents at the election were committed to Newgate prison by the House of Commons for ‘notorious and scandalous bribery and corruption’ and as a result the Bribery Act was passed in 1729. He was returned again for Beverley at the 1734 British general election and voted with the Government on the Spanish convention in 1739. He was defeated at the 1741 British general election.

Bradshaw died 28 June 1742, leaving two daughters.

Parliament of Great Britain
Preceded by Sir Charles Hotham, Bt; Michael Newton	Member of Parliament for Beverley; 1727–1729; With: Charles Pelham	Succeeded by Sir Charles Hotham, Bt; Charles Pelham
Preceded by Sir Charles Hotham, Bt; Charles Pelham	Member of Parliament for Beverley; 1734–1741; With: Sir Charles Hotham, Bt 1734-1738; Charles Pelham 1738-1741	Succeeded by Charles Pelham; William Strickland
