= Sir Charles Hotham, 5th Baronet =

British Army officer and politician

Brigadier-General Sir Charles Hotham Bt
- Born: 25 April 1693
- Died: 15 January 1738 (aged 44)
- Military career
- Allegiance: United Kingdom
- Branch: British Army
- Rank: Brigadier-General

Brigadier-General Sir Charles Hotham, 5th Baronet (25 April 1693 – 15 January 1738), of South Dalton, Yorkshire, was a British Army officer and politician who sat in the House of Commons between 1723 and 1738. He was entrusted by King George II with the task of negotiating a double marriage between the Hanover and Hohenzollern dynasties.

== Early life ==
Hotham was the eldest son of Sir Charles Hotham, 4th Baronet of Scorborough, near Beverley, Yorkshire, MP, and his wife Bridget Gee, daughter of William Gee of Bishop's Burton, Yorkshire. He joined the British Army in 1706, and as a young man, visited Hanover, where he became a friend of the electoral prince, afterwards George II. He was a captain in his father's regiment in 1715 and in 1720, became lieutenant-colonel in the 7th Dragoon Guards. He succeeded to the baronetcy on the death of his father in 1723. In April 1724, he married Lady Gertrude Stanhope, the daughter of Philip Stanhope, 3rd Earl of Chesterfield.

== Career ==
Hotham was elected Member of Parliament for the family seat at Beverley in a contest at a by-election on 31 January 1723. He voted with the Administration in every recorded division. On the accession of George II in 1727, he was appointed a Groom of the Bedchamber, a position he held until his death. At the 1727 British general election he was defeated at the poll, but was returned as MP for Beverley on petition on 8 March 1729. The king sent him in 1730 on a confidential mission to arrange a double marriage between the heirs apparent and the Princesses Royal of England and Prussia. He was rewarded by being made Colonel of the Royal Regiment of Ireland (1732–35) and afterwards Colonel of the 1st Troop, Horse Grenadier Guards. He was elected MP for Beverley again in a contest at the 1734 British general election.

== The double marriage ==
Queen Sophia Dorothea of Prussia, sister of George II of Great Britain, had long cherished the prospect of marrying her daughter, Wilhelmina, to the Prince of Wales, and her son, the Crown Prince Frederick, to the British Princess Emily. Her husband, King Frederick William I of Prussia, saw the advantage of the union, but was torn between his desire to draw closer to Protestant England and his position as a subject of the Austro-Hungarian Emperor Charles VI. His mutual dislike for his English brother-in-law and first cousin did not help matters.

The Austrians had for years heavily funded the efforts of General von Seckendorff to buy off Frederick William's closest associates and so influence the King towards a pro-Austrian and anti-British policy.

Colonel Hotham, who had been appointed a Groom of the Bedchamber in 1727 on the accession of George II, was empowered by the king with the authority to arrange for a double marriage between the two houses. He arrived in Prussia on 2 April 1730, armed with incriminating letters of Seckendorff's tactics.

The marriage talks, after some initial stumbling, held promise, especially as Hotham had made a good impression on the entire Hohenzollern family.

Frederick William approved wholly of the marriage of Wilhelmina to the Prince of Wales, and, while stating that the crown prince Frederick, at 18, was too young to marry, did let it be known that, within ten years, a marriage to a suitable English princess was acceptable. Unfortunately, George II, while willing to consider such an alliance, stated that he would only allow "both marriages or neither" which meant that the Anglo-Prussian alliance could not happen until Frederick was allowed to wed as well. Then, on 12 July, Hotham, in an attempt to strengthen his position by discrediting the Austrian contingent at court, produced letters incriminating Seckendorff and several of the King's associates. Frederick William flew into a rage at the tactic, threw the letter to the floor, and stalked out of the room.

Hotham took his treatment as an insult to the majesty of England, and immediately arranged for transport to take him back to England.

The Crown Prince had long contemplated fleeing Prussia to avoid the continual physical and emotional abuse of his father, but had held off on his plans so long as the double marriage prospect was viable. With the collapse of the negotiations, he contrived, with his close friend Hans von Katte, to flee to Paris. The plan was discovered and both were arrested and gaoled. Katte was executed and Frederick was forced by his father to watch the execution from his cell window, an event which stood as a psychological milestone in the life of the future Frederick the Great.

== Death and legacy ==
Hotham died, aged 45, on 15 January 1738, leaving one surviving son and three daughters. He was succeeded in the baronetcy by his son Sir Charles Hotham, 6th Baronet.

Parliament of Great Britain
Preceded by Sir Charles Hotham, 4th Bt; Michael Newton	Member of Parliament for Beverley; 1723–1727; With: Michael Newton	Succeeded by Ellerker Bradshaw; Charles Pelham
Preceded by Ellerker Bradshaw; Charles Pelham	Member of Parliament for Beverley; 1729 –1738; With: Charles Pelham 1729-1734; Ellerker Bradshaw 1734-1738	Succeeded by Charles Pelham; Ellerker Bradshaw
Military offices
Preceded by William Cosby	Colonel of the Royal Regiment of Ireland; 1732–1735	Succeeded by John Armstrong
Baronetage of England
Preceded by Charles Hotham	Baronet (of Scorborough); 1723-1738	Succeeded by Charles Hotham
