= John Tufnell =

British politician (1720–1794)

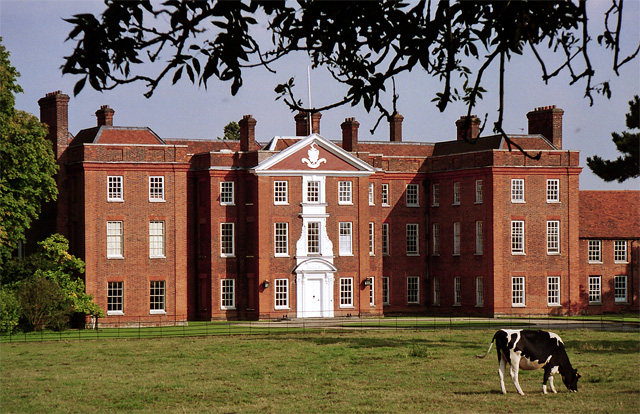
Langleys, Great Waltham

John Joliffe Tufnell (1720–1794), was a British politician who sat in the House of Commons from 1754 to 1761.

Tufnell was the son of Samuel Tufnell MP of Monken Hadley, Hertfordshire and Langleys, Essex and his wife Elizabeth Cressener, daughter of George Cressener of Earl's Colne, Essex and was born on 27 June 1720. He entered Middle Temple in 1737 and Corpus Christi College, Cambridge in 1738. He married Anna Meeke, daughter of William Meeke of Northallerton, Yorkshire on 2 April 1748.

Tufnell was elected as Member of Parliament for Beverley in a contest in the 1754 general election. Little is known of his contribution in parliament. He was listed under the heading “country gentlemen” and was counted as a Government supporter. He did not stand in 1761 when his brother George took over the seat.

Tufnell succeeded his father on 28 December 1758, inheriting Langleys in Great Waltham, Essex. He became one of the richest commoners in England, renting out property in Essex and the north. He died on 23 September 1794.

Parliament of Great Britain
Preceded by Charles Pelham; Sir William Codrington, Bt	Member of Parliament for Beverley; 1754–1761; With: Sir William Codrington, Bt	Succeeded by Michael Newton; George Tufnell
