= Robert Sutton (diplomat) =

English diplomat and politician

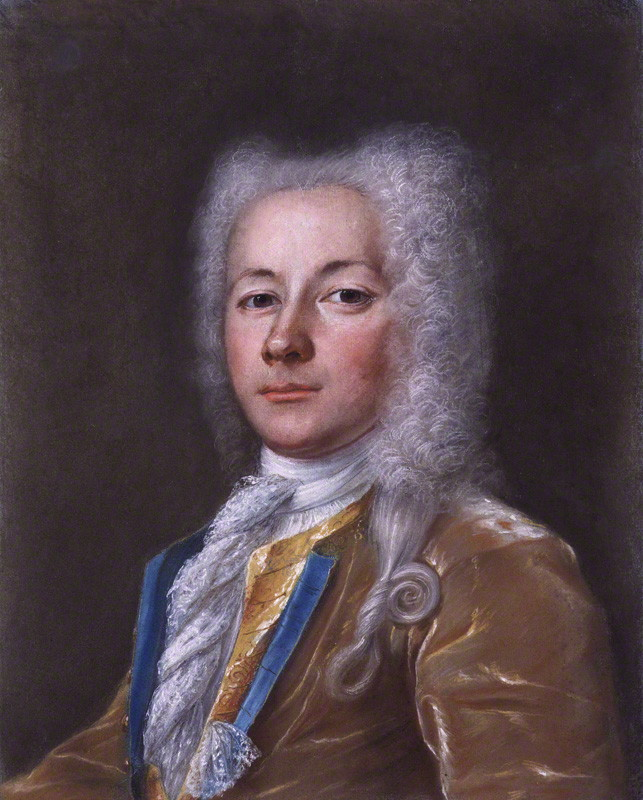

Sir Robert Sutton KB PC (1671 – 13 August 1746) was an English diplomat and politician who sat in the House of Commons from 1722 to 1741.

== Early life ==
Sutton was the elder son of Robert Sutton of Averham, Nottinghamshire, and his wife, Katherine, the daughter of the Revd William Sherborne of Pembridge, Herefordshire. He was great-nephew of the 1st Baron Lexinton. He was admitted to Trinity College, Oxford in 1688 and went on to the Middle Temple in 1691.

== Diplomat ==
Sutton was ordained a deacon and became chaplain to his cousin Robert Sutton, 2nd Baron Lexinton, English Envoy in Vienna in 1694. In 1697, he was appointed as secretary to the British legation there, and upon the departure of his cousin, became the English resident there. Lexinton then secured for him the nomination for English ambassador to the Ottoman Empire in Constantinople on 5 December 1700, and he arrived in Adrianople on 7 January 1702.

Sutton asked to be recalled on 6 May 1715. He remained there until the summer of 1717, when he travelled to Vienna, arriving on 17 September. Afterwards, he served with Abraham Stanyan as joint mediator at the Austro-Turkish peace congress at Passarowitz in 1718. His final diplomatic posting was as ambassador to France in 1720, but was superseded the following year. Following his return to England, he bought estates in Lincolnshire and Nottinghamshire, worth nearly £5,000 a year, with a house at Broughton, Lincolnshire.

In Constantinople in 1704, Sutton acquired the Arabian grey horse Alcock's Arabian with some other Arabians, and had him shipped to England. The horse is considered to be the ancestor of all grey Thoroughbreds.

== Politician and financier ==
Having become rich in diplomatic service, Sutton was elected Whig MP Nottinghamshire in 1722. He was appointed a member of the Privy Council on 9 May 1722. He became a member of the committee of Charitable Corporation in 1725, and made money by insider trading in its shares. He was expelled from the House of Commons 4 May 1732 for a false statement that the company's authorised capital had been exhausted, allowing it to issue more (and so finance the corrupt speculation of other directors). He was also sub-governor of the Royal Africa Company from 1726. However, he was elected unopposed in 1734 for Great Grimsby.

Sutton married Judith Tichborne, daughter of Sir Benjamin Tichborne of Beaulieu, County Louth and Elizabeth Gibbs, and widow of Charles Spencer, 3rd Earl of Sunderland. Their children included Sir Richard Sutton, 1st Baronet, and an older brother, Robert Sutton, who predeceased his father in November 1743.

He was also patron of the cleric William Warburton.

== See also ==
- List of Ambassadors from the United Kingdom to the Ottoman Empire
- Sutton Baronets

Diplomatic posts
Preceded by Robert Sutton, 2nd Baron Lexinton as Envoy Extraordinary	British Resident at Vienna; 1697–1700	Succeeded by George Stepney as Envoy Extraordinary
Preceded by Lord Paget	British Ambassador to the Ottoman Empire; 1700 – 1717	Succeeded by Edward Wortley Montagu
Preceded by The Earl of Stair	British Ambassador to France; 1720–1721	Succeeded by Sir Luke Schaub
Parliament of Great Britain
Preceded by William Levinz; Hon. Francis Willoughby	Member of Parliament for Nottinghamshire; 1722–1732; With: The Viscount Howe	Succeeded by William Levinz; Thomas Bennet
Preceded by John Page; George Monson	Member of Parliament for Great Grimsby; 1734–1741; With: Robert Knight	Succeeded by William Lock; Robert Knight
