= William Powlett =

William Powlett may refer to:

- Lord William Powlett (c.1663/7–1729), British politician who represented Lymington and Winchester
- William Powlett (MP) (c.1693–1757), son of the above, British politician who represented Lymington, Winchester and Whitchurch
- William Vane, 3rd Duke of Cleveland (1792–1864), British politician known as "Lord William Powlett" from 1809 to 1864
- William Powlett Powlett, English landowner and politician
- Lord William Paulet (1804–1894), British field marshal

== See also ==
- William Orde-Powlett, 5th Baron Bolton
