= Anne Elizabeth Temple-Nugent-Brydges-Chandos-Grenville, Duchess of Buckingham =

English noble (1779-1836)

Her Grace The Duchess of Buckingham and Chandos
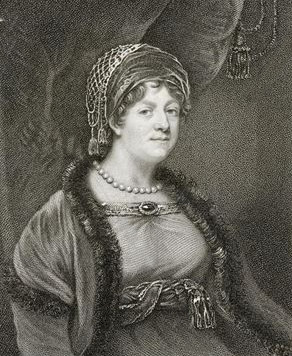
- The Duchess of Buckingham and Chandos

Personal details
- Born: Anna Eliza Brydges; 27 October 1779
- Died: 15 May 1836 (aged 56) Stowe, Buckinghamshire, England
- Spouse(s): Richard Temple-Nugent-Brydges-Chandos-Grenville, 1st Duke of Buckingham and Chandos (m. 1796)
- Children: Richard Temple-Nugent-Brydges-Chandos-Grenville, 2nd Duke of Buckingham and Chandos
- Parents: James Brydges, 3rd Duke of Chandos (father); Anne Eliza Elletson (mother)

Anne Elizabeth Temple-Nugent-Brydges-Chandos-Grenville, Duchess of Buckingham and Chandos, Lady Kinloss (née Brydges, 27 October 1779 – 15 May 1836), styled Countess Temple from 1796 to 1813 and The Marchioness of Buckingham from 1813 to 1822, was an English peeress.

== Life ==
Anna Eliza Brydges was born in 1779 as the only child of James Brydges, 3rd Duke of Chandos and Anne Eliza Elletson (nee Gamon). By the time she was six, her parents had agreed that they planned to marry her to the boy who would be the 1st Duke of Buckingham and Chandos. This could have been a classic arranged marriage, but the betrothed were in contact by age 14, and they were keen to become partners.

Her mother's first husband had been Roger Hope Elletson (1723-1775), Lieutenant Governor of Jamaica, who had left her mother the Hope Plantation in Saint Andrew Parish, Jamaica. They married in 1775, and he died the same year, leaving her as an absentee manager. After her second marriage, she continued to be an enthusiastic manager of the land and hundreds of slaves that she inherited in Jamaica. However, she was declared a lunatic in 1791.

Anna Eliza married Richard Temple-Nugent-Brydges-Chandos-Grenville, 1st Duke of Buckingham and Chandos in 1796. He proved to be a spendthrift, and before she realised he had already disposed of some of her land, despite this being in contravention of her marriage settlement. She rearranged their finances, and she is credited with saving the family from bankruptcy. Although her husband failed to lose all their money, her son, Richard took after his father and managed to bring the family to bankruptcy in 1847.

Anne Elizabeth Temple-Nugent-Brydges-Chandos-Grenville, Duchess of Buckingham, died in Stowe, Buckinghamshire in 1836, aged 56 or 57.
