= Sir William Heathcote, 1st Baronet =

British merchant and politician

Sir William Heathcote, 1st Baronet (15 March 1693 – 10 May 1751), of Hursley, Hampshire, was a British merchant and politician who sat in the House of Commons between 1722 and 1741.

Heathcote was the second son of Samuel Heathcote, Esq., of Hackney, Middlesex, younger brother of Sir Gilbert Heathcote, 1st Baronet, and an intimate friend of John Locke, whom he assisted in his work of regulating the coin of this kingdom.

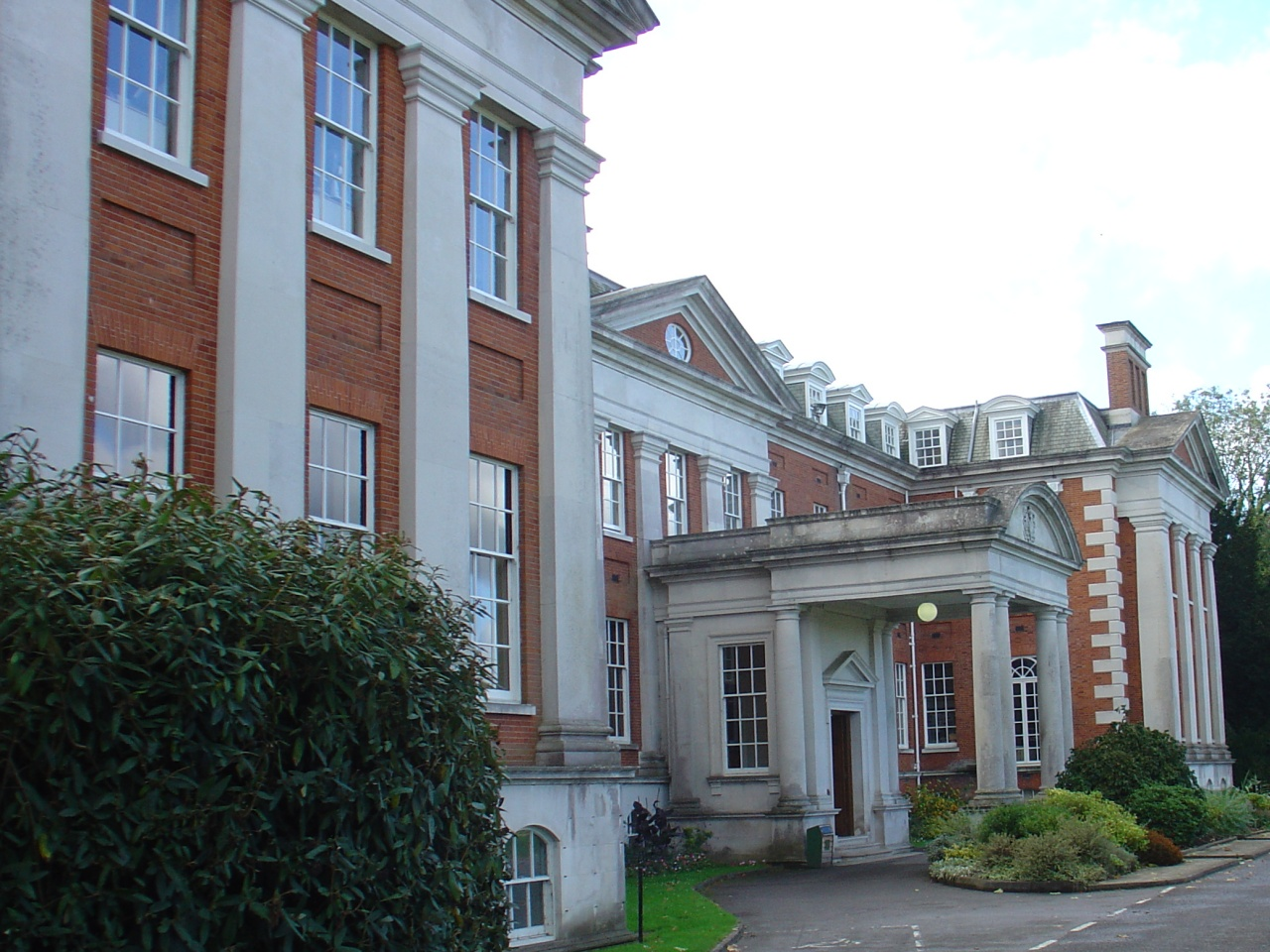
Hursley House

Heathcote was a successful merchant who purchased the Hursley estate in 1718. Between the years of 1721 and 1724 William built a red brick, Queen Anne style mansion now known as Hursley House on the site of a hunting lodge.

Heathcote represented Buckingham in the House of Commons from 1722 to 1727 and Southampton from 1729 to 1741. On 16 August 1733 he was created a baronet, of Hursley in the County of Southampton.

Heathcote married Elizabeth, only daughter of Thomas Parker, 1st Earl of Macclesfield, in 1720. They had six sons and three daughters:

- Mary (d. 20 May 1812) married Thomas Parker, 3rd Earl of Macclesfield. They had two sons, and a daughter.
- Elizabeth Drake (1730–1797) married Vice-Adm. Francis William Drake. They had two daughters.
- Reverend Henry (circa 1721–1803)
- Sir Thomas Heathcote, 2nd Baronet (23 July 1721 – 27 June 1787)
- George (d. 31 March 1735) Died in infancy.
- Rev. William (10 Sep 1723 – 22 Sep 1748)
- Gilbert (1732–1800)
- Jennetta (8 Aug 1737 – Oct 1809)

He died in 1751 and the estate and baronetcy passed to his son, Thomas.

== His sister, Lady Drake ==
Anne Lady Drake was baptized at Hackney anno 1702, and married Sir Francis Henry Drake, Bart. of Buckland in Dorsetshire. One of their sons was Francis William Drake, who married his first cousin, Sir William Heathcote's daughter, Elizabeth in 1763. Another son was Sir Francis Samuel Drake, 1st Baronet. The Hackney church records that "Lady Ann Drake, [was] buried Nov. 5, 1768."

Parliament of Great Britain
Preceded by Alexander Denton; Richard Grenville	Member of Parliament for Buckingham; 1722–1727; With: Richard Grenville 1722–1727; John Fane 1727	Succeeded by John Fane; Thomas Lewis
Preceded by Robert Eyre; Anthony Henley	Member of Parliament for Southampton; 1729–1741; With: Anthony Henley 1727–1734; John Conduitt 1734–1737; Thomas Lee Dummer 1737–1741	Succeeded by Peter Delmé; Edward Gibbon
Baronetage of Great Britain
New creation	Baronet (of Hursley); 1733–1751	Succeeded by Thomas Heathcote
