= Norton Powlett =

Norton Paulet or Powlett may refer to:

- Norton Powlett (died 1741), Member of Parliament for Petersfield
- Norton Powlett (died 1750), his son, MP for Winchester
