= Avington Park =

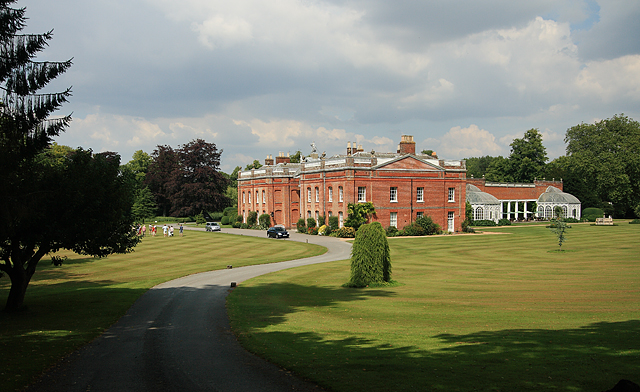
- Avington House

- Location within Hampshire

General information
- Type: Country house
- Location: Itchen Valley near Winchester, Hampshire
- Coordinates: 51.0877°N 1.2410°W
- Completed: 16th century

Avington House is a 16th-century English country house which stands in Avington Park in the Itchen Valley near Winchester, Hampshire. It is a Grade I listed building.

Originally a late 16th-century half-H house built by John Clerk it was substantially rebuilt in the 17th century by George William Brydges, who added the service courtyard and banqueting hall. It was then refronted in the late 18th century by James Brydges, 3rd Duke of Chandos. In 1848 Sir John Shelley added a conservatory.

The building is now constructed of brick and blue with slate and lead roofs. The half-H main block is in two storeys with a 13-bay frontage, of which the central 5 bays are recessed.

== History ==
Avington Park was granted to Edmund Clerk by Henry VIII. It was bought in 1664 by George Rodney Brydges, who married the infamous Anna Maria Talbot, Countess of Shrewsbury and was a Groom of the Bedchamber to Charles II. It passed to his son George William Brydges who carried out the major remodelling. He had no children and left most of his estate to Henry Brydges, 2nd Duke of Chandos, after which it descended to his son, the courtier James Brydges, 3rd Duke of Chandos, who improved the gardens and parkland.

The estate then descended to the 3rd Duke's only surviving daughter, Lady Anne Elizabeth Brydges, who married Richard Temple-Grenville, 1st Duke of Buckingham and Chandos and in turn to their son Richard Temple-Nugent-Brydges-Chandos-Grenville, 2nd Duke of Buckingham and Chandos, the Lord Privy Seal. He sold it in 1847 to Sir John Shelley, the younger brother of the poet Percy Bysshe Shelley.

In 1961 it was bought by Lt. Col and Mrs Hickson and put in trust for their family.

A privately owned estate, Avington only houses weddings and private events.

== Events and Weddings ==
Avington Park holds events and weddings at the estate throughout the year.
