= Embassy of Austria, London =

Austrian Embassy in London

Embassy of Austria in London
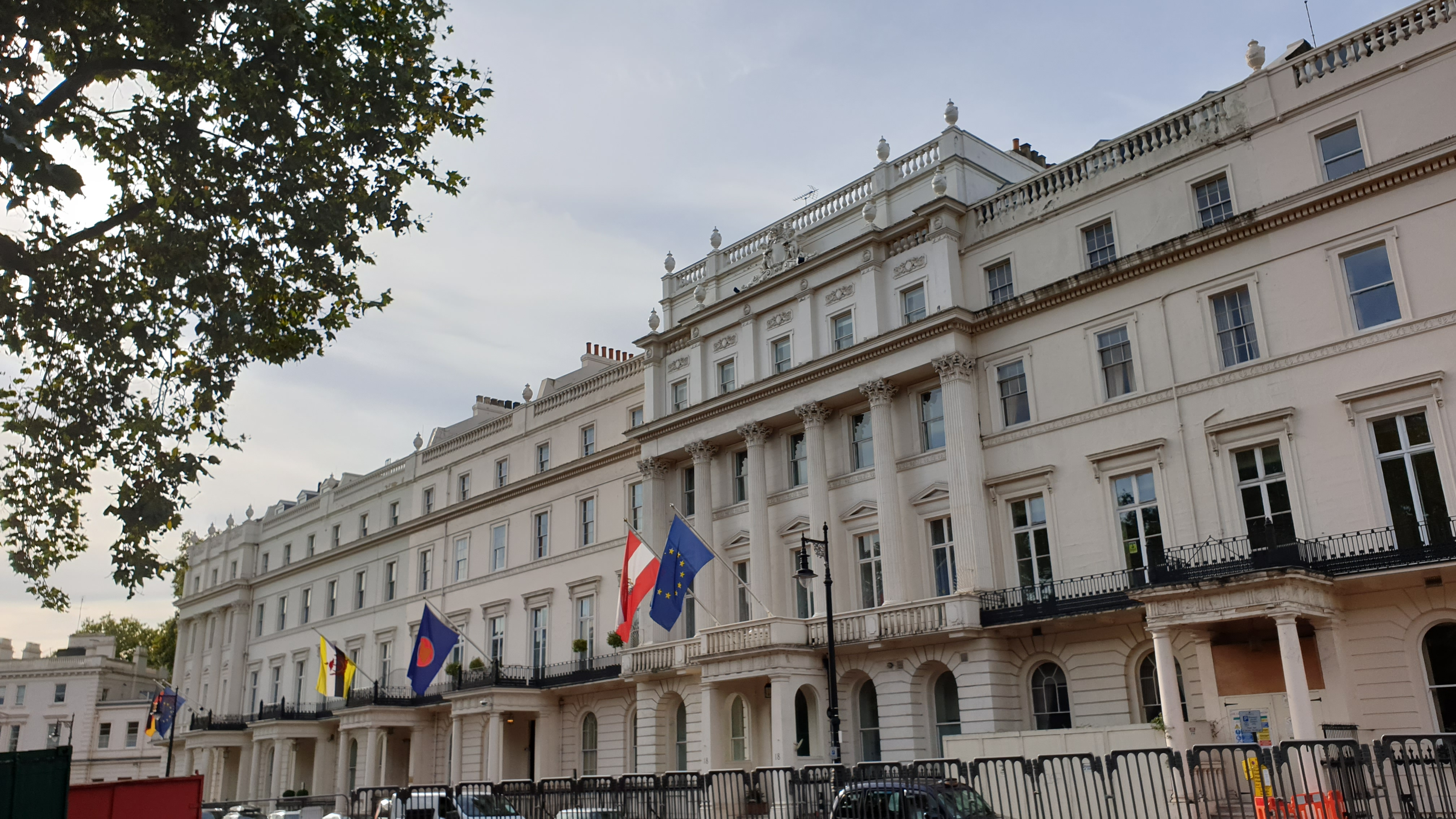
- Location: Belgravia, London, UK
- Address: 18 Belgrave Mews West; London, SW1X 8HU
- Coordinates: 51°29′54.6″N 0°9′16.9″W
- Ambassador: Bernhard Wrabetz

The Embassy of Austria in London is the diplomatic mission of the Republic of Austria in the United Kingdom. The embassy is located at 18 Belgrave Mews West in the Belgravia area of London, and the residence of the ambassador is located at 18 Belgrave Square.

== History ==
From Rudolf Agstner, Von Chandos House zum Belgrave Square – Österreichs Botschaft in London 1815–1997, Mitteilungen des Österreichischen Staatsarchivs (Sonderdruck):

"The history of the Austrian Embassy in London is remarkable in many ways. Since the Congress of Vienna, it has moved its quarters only once, in 1866, from Chandos House to 18 Belgrave Square. It is the only Embassy building of the Imperial and Royal Austro-Hungarian Foreign Service still used today by Austrian diplomacy.

After the Napoleonic Wars and the Congress of Vienna, the Austrian Empire reestablished her diplomatic mission in London. In 1816, Paul Anton III Prince Esterházy de Galantha rented Chandos House, N° 2, Queen Anne Street, London SW, as his residence and as chancery of the embassy. It had been built around 1770 by architect Robert Adam for the Duke of Buckingham and was considered one of the most beautiful townhouses. As the building became old and dilapidated and its owner intended to pull it down, Ambassador Rudolph Count Apponyi in 1866 concluded a sublease for the townhouse at 18, Belgrave Square.

The new residence of the Austrian ambassador and chancery of the building had been built between 1814 and 1825 by architect George Basevi according to a development plan for Belgrave Square by Thomas Cubitt and Joseph Cundry. The actual builder and first resident was philanthropist William Haldimand. The building was situated on an area of 10.686 square feet at the western side of Belgrave Square, Parish St. George Hanover Square in Middlesex County. It had 4 floors facing Belgrave Square, and 5 floors on the back facing the mews. In 1866, it consisted of 74 living rooms, salons, corridors, anterooms, servants’ pantries, staircases and closets.

After several short-term contracts, Ambassador Count Francis Deym finally in 1892 bought the town house at 18, Belgrave Square on behalf of Austria-Hungary. A small wing was added to the building, consisting of two rooms that served as archives and chancery for administrative affairs, and another room above to be used jointly by three diplomats. In 1911 the office wing was adapted further, providing space for the commercial director, an office, an anteroom and two rooms for the military and naval attachés.

When on August 12, 1914 Great Britain declared war on Austria-Hungary, the rupture of diplomatic relations became unavoidable. On August 13, the embassy was entrusted to the protection of the ambassador of the United States. This protection was brought to an end with the severing of diplomatic relations of Austria-Hungary with the United States on April 6, 1917. From April 1917 to August 1920, the Royal Swedish Legation in London looked after the embassy building, the consulates and Austro-Hungarian interests.

Protection ended when Austria opened her legation in London on August 18, 1920 and George Franckenstein became the first minister plenipotentiary after the war, remaining so until 1938. The long-running dispute between Austria and Hungary over the rights to the Westminster lease was only resolved in 1934, when Hungary finally ceded the rights to the lease.

After Hitler proclaimed the Anschluss of Austria to the German Reich on March 13, 1938, the building N° 18, Belgrave Square was used as consular department of the German embassy. After the outbreak of World War II until July 31, 1945, the Swiss legation took over the protection of German interests in the United Kingdom, which then included the former Austrian legation on Belgrave Square. Swiss protection ended on July 31, 1945. Between August 1, 1945 and September 28, 1948, the severely damaged former legation building was administered by the Ministry of Works.

On September 29, 1948, the legation building was returned to Austria. 2 months later, on November 29, a new lease was concluded for 86 years, until Michaelmas (i.e. 29 September) 2034. On January 30, 1952 Lothar Wimmer presented his credentials as Ambassador of Austria.

The historic mansion on 18, Belgrave Square continues to serve as residence to the Austrian ambassador. The mews wing which until the 1960s also contained apartments has been used exclusively as office space in the last decades. Before Austria assumed the EU-Presidency for the first time in 1998, extensive modernisation work was undertaken to turn it into a modern and spacious office-building."

== Gallery ==
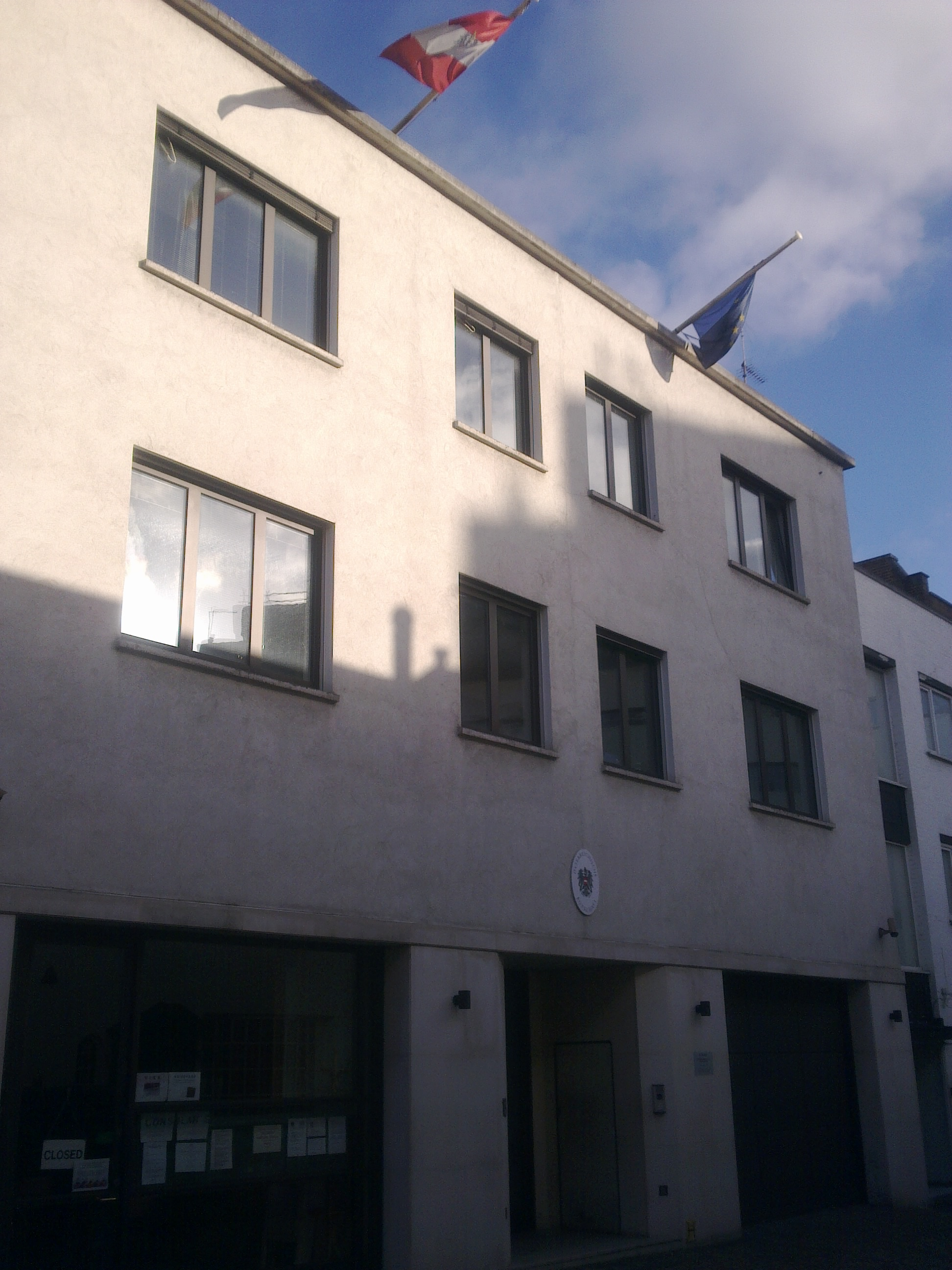
The Austrian Embassy at 18 Belgrave Mews West

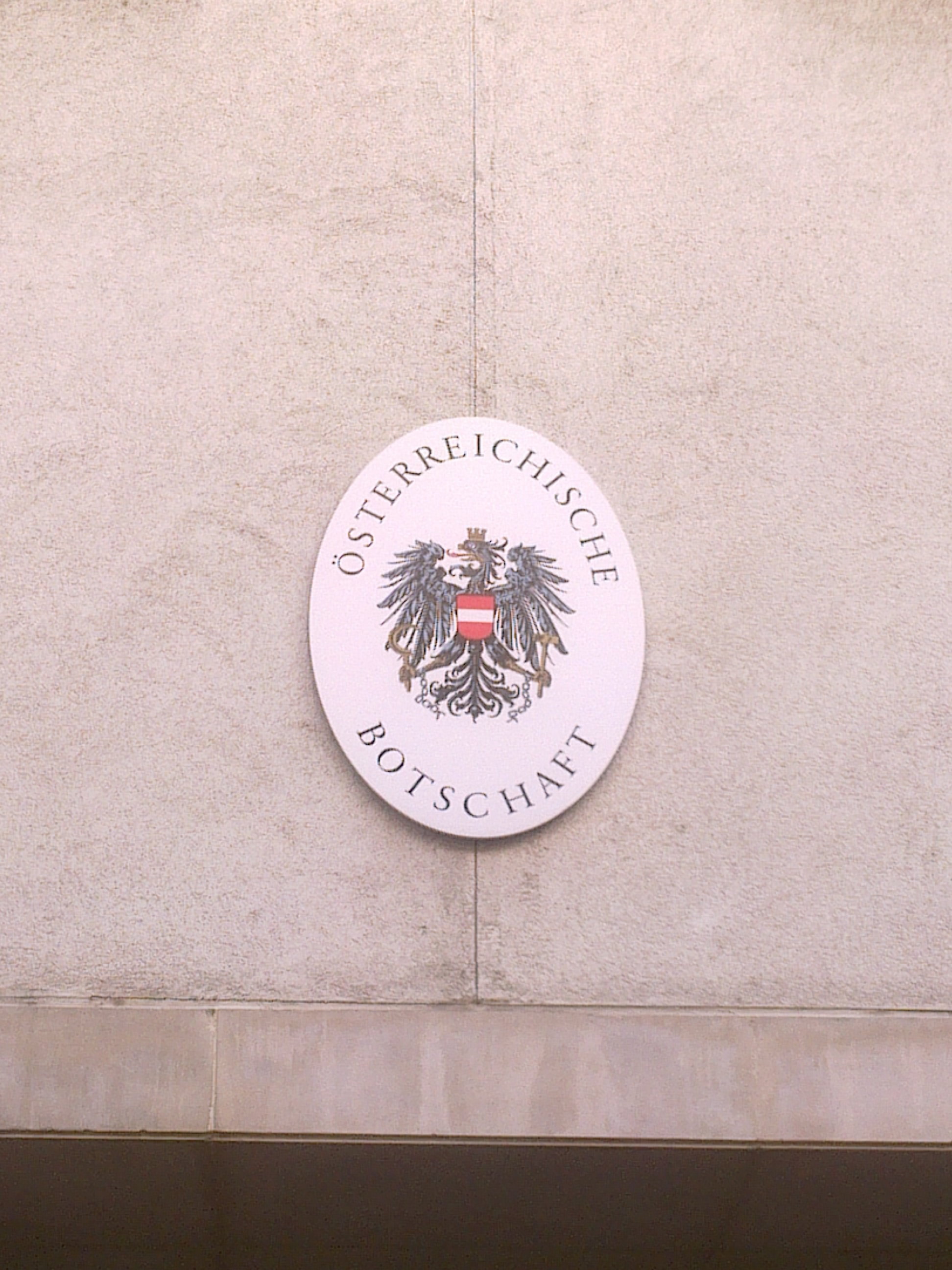
Plaque outside the embassy in German depicting the coat of arms of Austria

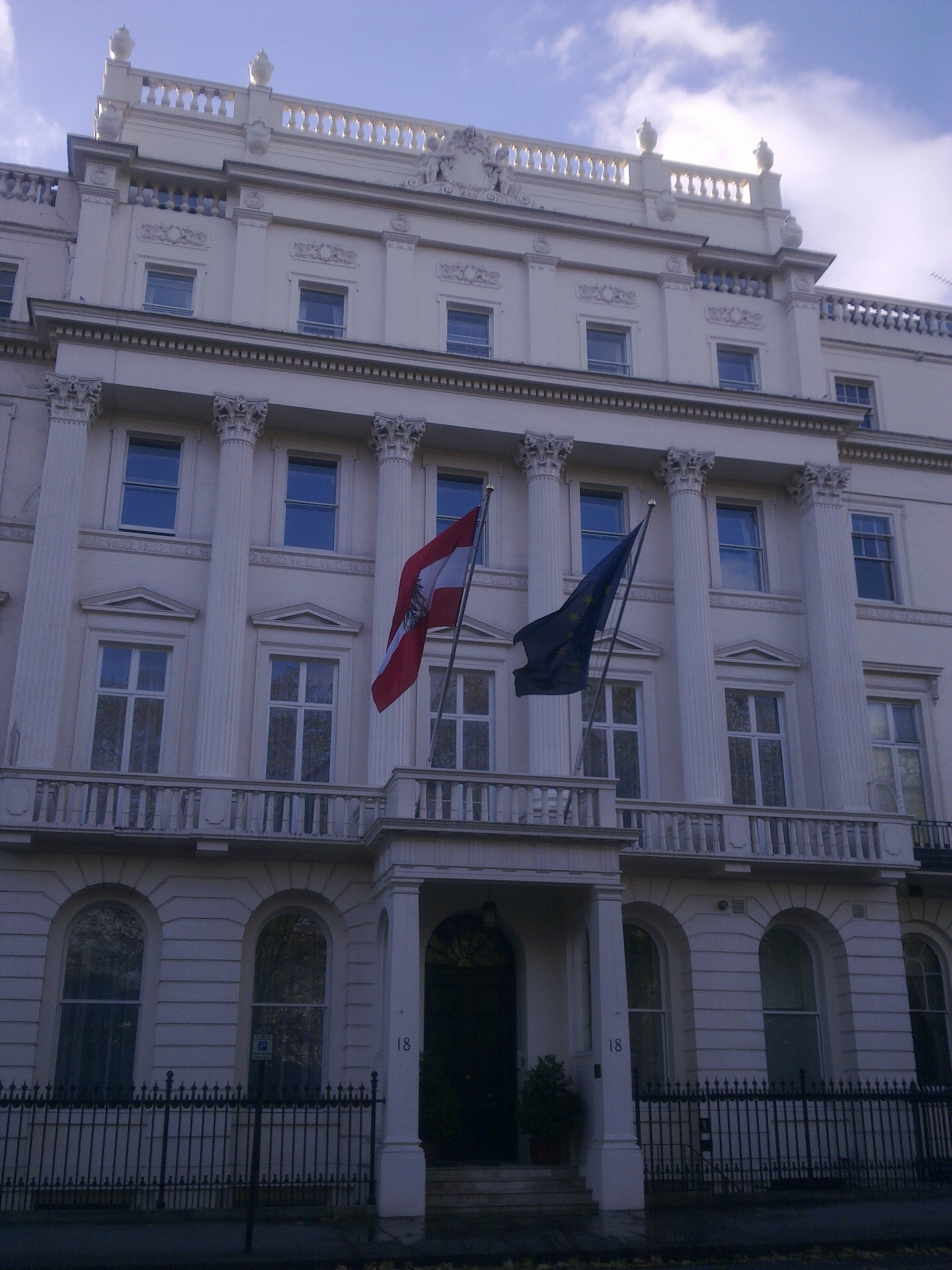
The residence of the ambassador at 18 Belgrave Square

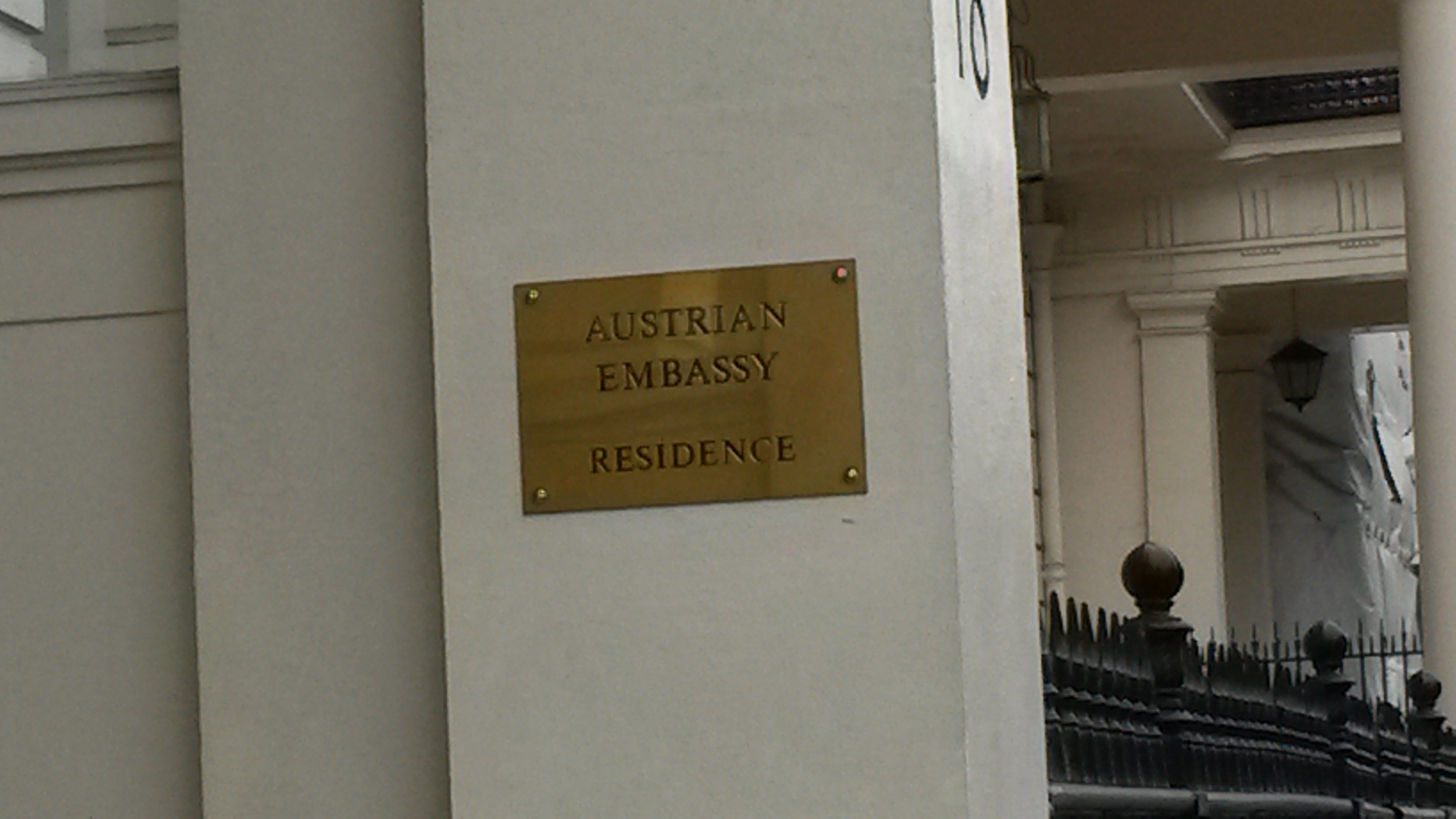
Plaque outside the residence of the ambassador

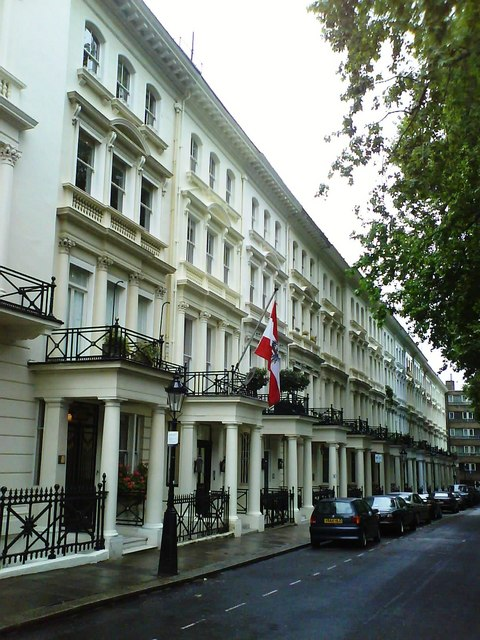
Austrian Cultural Forum London at 28 Rutland Gate
