= Matthew Ducie Moreton, 2nd Baron Ducie =

British Whig politician

Matthew Ducie Moreton, 2nd Baron Ducie (died 1770) of Tortworth, Gloucestershire, was a British Whig politician who sat in the House of Commons between 1721 and 1735 winning by-elections at four separate constituencies but never winning at a general election. He vacated his seat when he succeeded to the peerage as Baron Ducie.

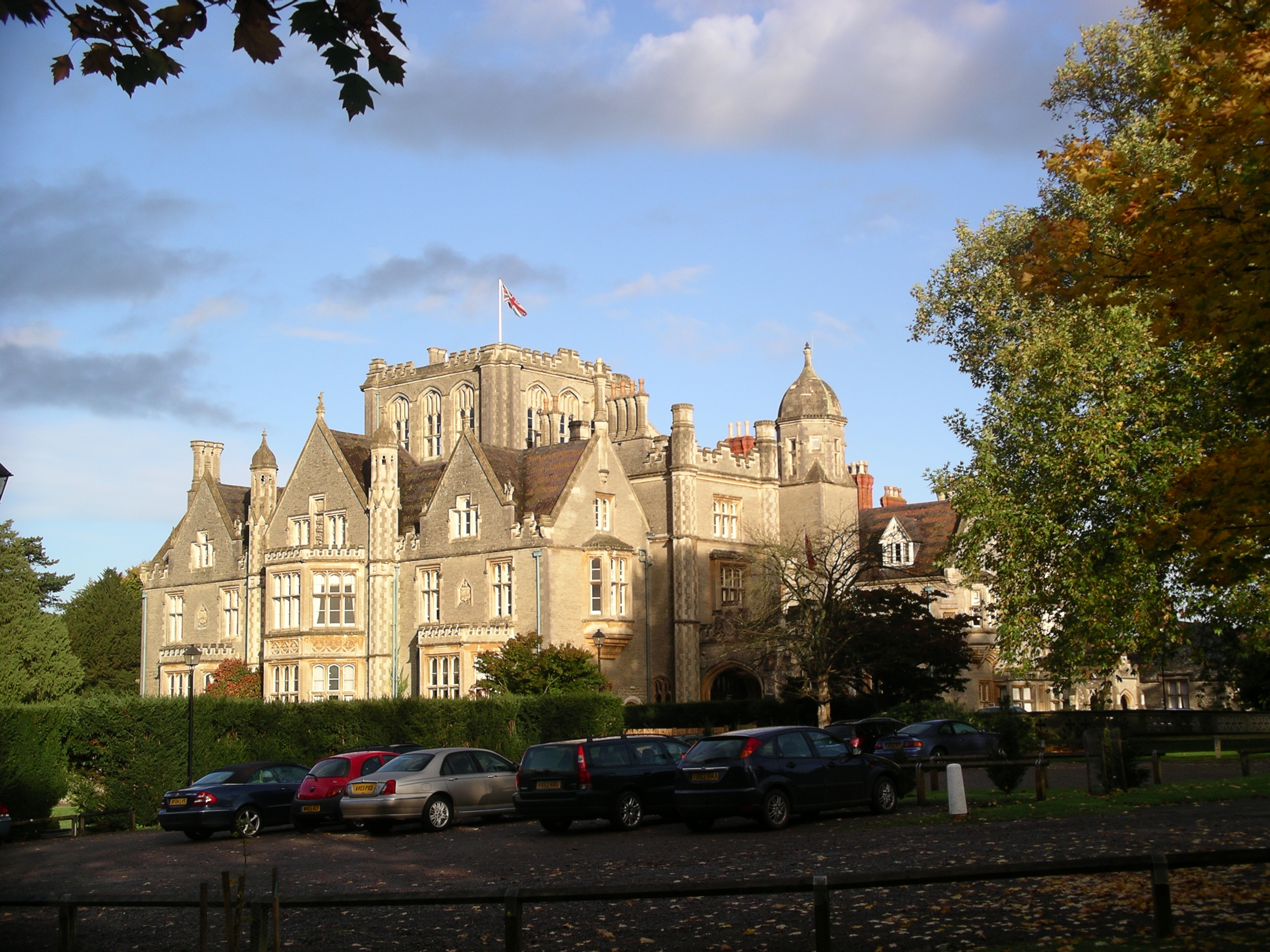
Tortworth Court

Moreton was the eldest son of Matthew Moreton, 1st Baron Ducie and his wife Arabella Prestwick, daughter of Sir Thomas Prestwick, 2nd Baronet, of Hulme, Lancashire. He was possibly educated at Harrow School.

Moreton's father left the House of Commons in 1720 on being raised to the peerage and the son was elected Member of Parliament for Cricklade at a contested by-election on 1 February 1721. Thereafter, he voted consistently for the Administration. He was defeated by a single vote at the 1722 general election. He was then elected MP for Calne at another contested by-election on 28 February 1723, possibly on the interest of Walter Hungerford to whom he was related. He stood in a contest for Gloucester at the 1727 general election, but was caught up in a double return and waived his rights. The Administration brought him in for Tregony at a by-election on 6 February 1729. He was subsequently brought in for Lostwithiel at a further by-election on 31 March 1735. A month later on 2 May 1735, he succeeded to the peerage as Baron Ducie on the death of his father.

When Walpole's government fell in 1742, Lord Ducie agreed to hold the office of surveyor of the petty customs in London in trust for Henry Bilson-Legge and Benjamin Keene, but in 1752 he asked to be relieved of it. In 1755 he was appointed Constable of St. Briavels, Warden of the Forest of Dean and Lord Lieutenant of Gloucestershire holding the posts to 1758, and High Steward of Gloucester which he held until 1766. He was unmarried and as his barony would become extinct, he was created Baron Ducie of Tortworth, on 27 April 1763 with a special remainder to the descent of his sister Elizabeth, who married Francis Reynolds.

Lord Ducie died unmarried in December 1770 and was succeeded by his nephew Thomas Reynolds, who adopted the name Moreton.

Parliament of Great Britain
Preceded by Sir Thomas Reade; Samuel Robinson	Member of Parliament for Cricklade; 1721–1722; With: Sir Thomas Reade	Succeeded by Sir Thomas Reade; Thomas Gore
Preceded by Edmund Pike Heath; George Duckett	Member of Parliament for Calne; 1723–1727; With: Edmund Pike Heath	Succeeded by William Duckett; William Wardour
Preceded by Thomas Smith; John Goddard	Member of Parliament for Tregony; 1729–1734; With: John Goddard	Succeeded by Henry Penton; John Goddard
Preceded by Richard Edgcumbe; Philip Lloyd	Member of Parliament for Lostwithiel; 1735; With: Richard Edgcumbe	Succeeded by Richard Edgcumbe; Sir John Crosse
Peerage of Great Britain
Preceded by Matthew Moreton	Baron Ducie; 1st creation 1735–1770	Extinct
New creation	Baron Ducie; 2nd creation 1763–1770	Succeeded by Thomas Reynolds-Moreton
