= Henry Penton (the elder) =

British Member of Parliament (c.1705–1762)

Henry Penton (c. 1705 – 1 September 1762) was a British Member of Parliament. He first entered Parliament on his wife's stepfather's interest for Tregony, a Cornish borough. He then represented his home city of Winchester for fourteen years before giving place to his son, dying the following year.

The eldest son of John Penton of Winchester, Penton was educated at New College, Oxford. He succeeded to his father's estates in 1724. In 1733, he married a Miss Simondi, the daughter of the Swedish consul at Lisbon by his wife Anne. She was the sister of Joseph Gulston, and later made a second marriage to John Goddard; both were merchants engaged in Portuguese trade and Members of Parliament.

The Pentons were an old Winchester family, and Henry was recorder of Winchester during his career, but he was first returned to Parliament on Goddard's interest for the Cornish borough of Tregony at the 1734 British general election. He was a dutiful supporter of the Walpole ministry and the succeeding Whig ministries, for which he was rewarded in 1743 with a grant of the reversion to the sinecure office of King's letter carrier. He succeeded to this office four years later.

At the 1747 British general election, he stood for Winchester instead, together with the incumbents George Brydges and William Powlett, relatives of the Dukes of Chandos and Bolton respectively. Brydges and Penton were returned with 50 and 37 votes, respectively, to 27 votes for Powlett. He spoke in support of a petition to suppress hawkers and pedlars in 1748, his only recorded speech in Parliament. In 1750, Lord Egmont thought, from Penton's confidences, that he might be discontented with the Ministry and prepared to join the opposition, but nothing came of it.

He was again returned at Winchester in the 1754 British general election, without a contest, and continued a supporter of the Ministry. Penton stood down at the 1761 British general election. His place was taken by his son Henry, to whom he was also permitted to resign his sinecure of King's letter carrier. Penton senior died the following year.

Parliament of Great Britain
Preceded by Matthew Ducie Moreton; John Goddard	Member of Parliament for Tregony; 1734–1747; With: John Goddard 1734–1737; Sir Robert Cowan 1737; Joseph Gulston 1737–1741; Thomas Watts 1741–1742; George Cooke 1742–1747	Succeeded by William Trevanion; Claudius Amyand
Preceded by George Brydges; William Powlett	Member of Parliament for Winchester; 1747–1761; With: George Brydges 1747–1751; Paulet St John 1751–1754; Marquess of Caernarvon 1754–1761	Succeeded by Henry Penton; Lord Harry Powlett
