= Anna Eliza Brydges, Duchess of Chandos =

English noble (1737–1823)

Anna Eliza Brydges, Duchess of Chandos (1737–1813) was an English aristocrat and planter. She married James Brydges, 3rd Duke of Chandos.

== Early life ==
Anna was the daughter of Richard Gamon and his wife, Elizabeth (née Grace). The Gamon family lived in a manor house, Datchworthbury, in the village of Datchworth, Hertfordshire. Elizabeth's family was based in Ireland.

Anna had a younger brother, Richard Grace Gamon, who became MP for Winchester. According to the History of Parliament, he opposed the Slave Trade Act 1788 to regulate the shipment of enslaved people to the West Indies, "where he owned estates".

== First marriage and the Hope Plantation ==
Her first husband was Roger Hope Elletson (1723-1775), an Old Etonian who grew sugar on Jamaica and who also served as Lieutenant Governor of the island.

Elletson died in England in 1775, leaving Anna the Hope Plantation near Kingston and the enslaved people who worked it. She was an absentee manager of the plantation into the 1780s, by which time she was joint owner with her second husband. The property passed to Anne, Anna's daughter by her second marriage and still belonged to the family in 1833 when slavery was abolished. The "Chandos inheritance" received by Anna's grandson Richard included £6,630 compensation for the loss of the slaves on the estate. This was awarded to the trustees of his marriage settlement.

== Later life ==
Anna married the 3rd Duke of Chandos in 1777. This was a second marriage for both parties. They had one child who survived to adulthood, Lady Anne Elizabeth Brydges (born 1779).^{1}

In 1789, the Duke died from injuries received when his wife inadvertently moved the chair he was about to sit in. In 1791, Anna was declared a lunatic and confined to her London home, Chandos House. She became a ward of court and there followed a lengthy lawsuit in the Irish courts over the management of her property. Ireland's Court of Chancery was supposedly protecting the duchess, but in 1794 judge Richard Power, accountant-general and usher of the Court of Chancery, was accused of misappropriating some of her income and he died in a presumed suicide.

She died in Chandos House and was buried in the Chandos Mausoleum attached to the parish church of St Lawrence Little Stanmore on 29th January 1813.

== Media interest ==
In 2015, Anna's ownership of a sugar plantation and her involvement in running it was discussed in a television programme, Britain's Forgotten Slave-owners, broadcast by the BBC. The programme was presented by the historian David Olusoga who was filmed at Chandos House. It won a BAFTA award and the Royal Historical Society Public History Prize Winner for Broadcasting.

== Notes ==
1. Anne Elizabeth married Richard Temple-Grenville, 1st Duke of Buckingham and Chandos. They were the parents of Richard Temple-Nugent-Brydges-Chandos-Grenville, 2nd Duke of Buckingham and Chandos.
