= Chandos House =

Historic building in London, England

Coordinates: 51°31′07″N 0°08′42″W

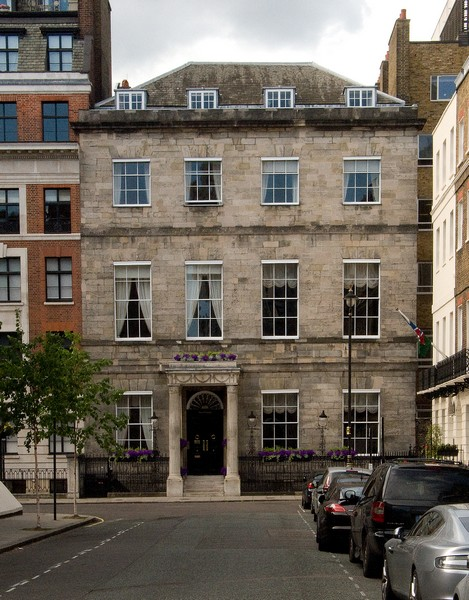
Chandos House in 2015

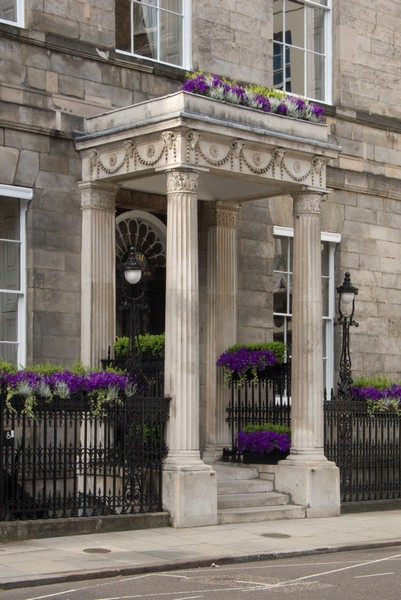
Front portico of Chandos House

Chandos House is a Grade I listed building at 2 Queen Anne Street, Marylebone, in central London. It was designed by Robert Adam, the most prominent architect in Georgian Britain, and built by William Adam and Company. It is seen as the first of a series of large townhouses in London, including 20 St. James's Square and Derby House.

== Construction ==
The house was built speculatively with monies from the Adam family and from the banker Sir George Colebrooke, later to be an Adam client himself. It was started in 1769 and finished in 1771, on a plot between another Adam house to the west and the garden wall of Foley House to the east, on land which was part of the Duke of Portland's estate. The façade is of Craigleith stone, perhaps as an advertisement for the quarry to the west of Edinburgh on which the Adam brothers' firm had recently taken a lease.

== Notable occupants ==
In 1813, the house was still home to Anna Eliza Brydges, Duchess of Chandos, whom the 3rd Duke of Chandos had married as his second wife in 1777. However, following the sudden death of the duke in 1789, the duchess was declared a lunatic. As a consequence, she was confined to the house and lost control of her estates. In May 1815, the unexpired portion of the lease (51 years) was sold by her executors and purchased by the Austrian embassy.

The first resident ambassador was Prince Esterházy, and for the next 25 years, Chandos House was the scene of entertainment on the most lavish scale. Contemporary newspapers record his wasteful splendour and oriental pomp. Eventually, his extravagance proved his ruin. He left the embassy in 1842 and was succeeded by Baron von Neumann. In 1866, the Austrian embassy moved to Belgrave Square in Belgravia, where the Embassy of Austria is still housed currently.

Following the embassy move, the house returned to the Chandos family when Anna Eliza Brydges's grandson, Richard Temple-Nugent-Brydges-Chandos-Grenville the 3rd Duke of Buckingham and Chandos obtained a new 99-year lease for the property.

When the Duke died in 1889, the lease passed to a nephew, William Temple-Gore-Langton the 4th Earl Temple of Stowe.

Newspaper magnate Gomer Berry (later Viscount Kemsley), became the last private owner of Chandos House, buying it from Anthony Ashley-Cooper, 9th Earl of Shaftesbury in 1927. It was his London home and the venue for his London entertaining until 1959 when the house was sold. Chandos House is currently owned by Cosmetic Doctor at Work Limited.
