= Lord William Powlett =

British politician (1666–1729)

William Powlett
- Lord William Powlett
- Born: 1666
- Died: 25 September 1729 (aged 62–63); Hyde Park, London
- Noble family: Paulet
- Spouses: Louisa de Caumont; Anne Egerton
- Issue: William Powlett; Charles Powlett; Mary Powlett; Jane Powlett; Henrietta Powlett
- Father: Charles Paulet, 1st Duke of Bolton
- Mother: Mary Scrope

Lord William Powlett (baptized 18 August 1666 – 25 September 1729) was an English Member of Parliament.

He was the younger son of Charles Paulet, 1st Duke of Bolton, and his second wife, Mary Scrope.

== Career ==
Lord William held a number of offices, including:

- Freeman, Winchester 1689, Lymington, 1689
- Deputy Lieutenant for Hampshire, 1689–1729
- Commissioner for assessment, Hampshire and Yorkshire (West Riding), 1689–90
- Captain of the independent company of Winchester Militia by 1697
- Recorder, Grimsby, 1699–1729
- Justice of the Peace, Hampshire and Lincolnshire, 1699–1729
- Mayor of Lymington, Hampshire, 1701–5, 1724–5, 1728–1729
- Keeper of Rhinefield walk, New Forest, 1718–1729
- Farmer of green-wax fines, 1690–1706
- Teller of the Exchequer, 1714–1729

He served as Member of Parliament for Winchester from 1689 to 1710, for Lymington from 1710 to 1715 and for Winchester from 1715 until his death in 1729. Lord William became Father of the House of Commons in 1724, on the demise of Richard Vaughan, the member for Carmarthen.

== Marriages and issue ==
William Powlett married twice:

- His first wife was Louisa, daughter of Armand-Nompar de Caumont, Marquis de Montpouillon, and granddaughter of Henri-Nompar de Caumont, 3rd Duc de La Force, by whom he had two sons and two daughters:

- William Powlett, c. 1693 – February 1757, married Lady Annabella Bennet, daughter of :Charles Bennet, 1st Earl of Tankerville and had issue
- Maj. Gen. Sir Charles Armand Powlett, died 1751
- Mary Powlett (died 15 August 1718), married on 25 June 1714 Richard Parsons, 1st Earl of Rosse
- Jane Powlett

- He married as his second wife, Anne Egerton (died 1737) in October 1699, by whom he had one daughter:

- Henrietta Powlett (died 1755), married William Townshend (died 1738)

== Death ==
He died on 25 September 1729, in his 63rd year, through a fall from his horse when riding in Hyde Park, London. Both his sons sat for various Hampshire boroughs as Whigs under George II.

== Sources ==
- "Bolton, Duke of (E, 1689 - 1794)". Cracroft's Peerage. Cracroftspeerage.co.uk.
- "Charles Powlett, Duke of Bolton". Family Search: Community Trees. British Isles. Peerage, Baronetage, and Landed Gentry families with extended lineage. Histfam.familysearch.org. Archived from the original on 20 December 2013.
- Cokayne, George Edward (1912). Gibbs, Vicary (ed.). "The complete peerage of England, Scotland, Ireland, Great Britain, and the United Kingdom : extant, extinct, or dormant". London: St Catherine Press. p. 210.
- "The Father of the House". UK Parliament. Parliament.uk.
- Helms, M. W.; Watson, Paula (1983). Henning, B. D. (ed.). "Powlett, (Paulet), Charles I, Lord St. John of Basing (c.1630–99), of Lincoln's Inn Fields, London and Hackwood, Hants". The History of Parliament: The House of Commons 1660-1690. Historyofparliamentonline.org.
- "Lord William Powlett". The Peerage. Thepeerage.com.
- Watson, Paula (1983). "Powlett, Lord William (1667–1729), of Chilbolton, Hants and Marrick Priory, Yorks.". In Henning, B. D. (ed.). The History of Parliament: The House of Commons 1660-1690. Historyofparliamentonline.org.
- Watson, Paula; Wynne, Sonya (2002). "Powlett, Lord William (1666–1729), of St. James's, Westminster, Mdx". In Hayton, D.; Cruickshanks, E. (eds.). The History of Parliament: The House of Commons 1690–1715. Historyofparliamentonline.org.
- Colonel George Jackson Hay (1905). An Epitomized History of the Militia (The Constitutional Force). London: United Service Gazette Offices.

republished by Ray Westlake, Military Books, 1987, ISBN 978-0-9508530-7-9
republished by Naval & Military Press, 2015, ISBN 978-1-78331-171-2

Parliament of England
Preceded by Earl of Wiltshire; Viscount Campden	Member of Parliament for Hampshire; 1689–1689; With: Earl of Wiltshire	Succeeded by Earl of Wiltshire; Thomas Jervoise
Preceded by Roger L'Estrange; Charles Hanses	Member of Parliament for Winchester; 1689–1707; With: Francis Morley 1689–1690; Frederick Tylney 1690–1701; George Rodney Brydges 1701–1707	Succeeded by (Parliament of Great Britain)
Parliament of Great Britain
Preceded by (Parliament of England)	Member of Parliament for Winchester; 1707–1710; With: George Rodney Brydges	Succeeded by George Rodney Brydges; Thomas Lewis
Preceded by Paul Burrard; Richard Chaundler	Member of Parliament for Lymington; 1710–1715; With: Paul Burrard 1710–1713; Sir Joseph Jekyll 1713–1715	Succeeded by Sir Joseph Jekyll; Richard Chaundler
Preceded by George Brydges; John Popham	Member of Parliament for Winchester; 1715–1729; With: George Brydges	Succeeded by George Brydges; Norton Powlett
Political offices
Preceded by The Earl of Denbigh	Teller of the Exchequer; 1715–1729	Succeeded by Sir Charles Turner, Bt
Preceded by Richard Vaughan (politician)	Father of the House; 1724–1729	Succeeded by Sir Justinian Isham, 4th Baronet
