= George William Brydges =

English politician

George Brydges or Bridges (1678–1751), of Avington, Hampshire, was an English Whig politician who sat in the House of Commons for 39 years between 1708 and 1751.

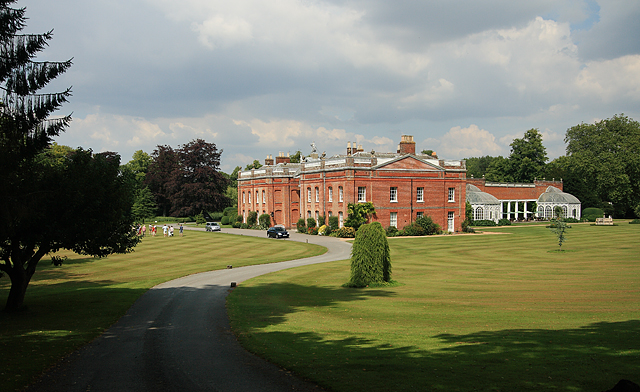
Avington Park, Hampshire

Brydges was born in July 1678, the only son of George Rodney Brydges and his wife Anna Maria Talbot, Countess of Shrewsbury. He was probably educated at Winchester College from 1686 to 1691 and travelled abroad in Holland in 1696.

He succeeded his father to Avington House in 1714 and uncle Harry Brydges at Keynsham, Somerset in 1728.

Brydges stood for parliament at Whitchurch at the 1708 general election, and though defeated in the poll, was returned on petition on 21 December 1708 as a Whig Member of Parliament. He did not stand in 1710. He married by licence dated 2 December 1712, Anne Woolfe, daughter of Sir Joseph Woolfe, mercer, of Hackney. His father died in 1714 and he was returned as MP for Winchester in his place at the succeeding by-election on 15 March 1714.

Brydges was returned as MP for Winchester the 1715 general election and in all succeeding general elections in 1722, 1727, 1734, 1741 up to and including the 1747 general election.

Brydges was paralytic in old age and was found drowned on 13 May 1751 in a canal in his gardens at Avington. He was buried in the parish church. He had no children and left most of his estate to Henry Brydges, 2nd Duke of Chandos.

Parliament of Great Britain
Preceded by Thomas Lewis; Frederick Tylney	Member of Parliament for Whitchurch; 1708–1710; With: Richard Wollaston	Succeeded by Frederick Tylney; Thomas Vernon
Preceded by George Rodney Brydges; Thomas Lewis	Member of Parliament for Winchester; 1715–1751; With: John Popham 1714-1715; Lord William Powlett 1715-1730; Norton Powlett 1730-1734; Paulet St John 1734-1741; William Powlett 1741-1747; Henry Penton 1747-1751	Succeeded by Paulet St John; Henry Penton
