= George Rodney Brydges =

English Whig politician

George Rodney Brydges or Bridges (after 1649 – 1714), of Avington, Hampshire, was an English Whig politician who sat in the English and British House of Commons between 1690 and 1714.

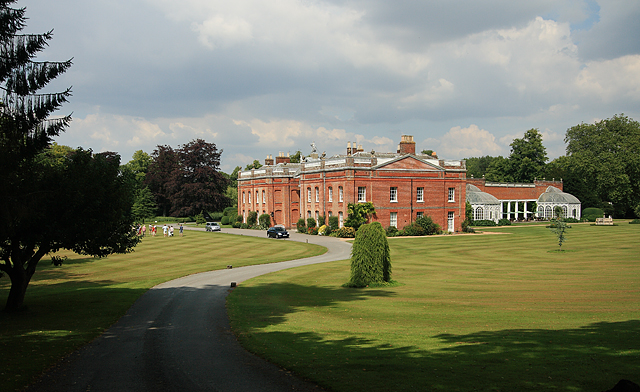
Avington Park, Hampshire

Brydges was the second surviving son of Sir Thomas Bridges of Keynsham, Somerset and his wife Anne Rodney, the daughter and coheiress of Sir Edward Rodney of Stoke Rodney, Somerset. He was a captain in the Duke of York's independent company from 1673 until after 1675 serving in the Portsmouth garrison. He got into debt and in 1677 he recovered his fortune by marrying Anna Maria Talbot, Countess of Shrewsbury. She was born Lady Anna Maria Brudenell, daughter of Robert, 2nd Earl of Cardigan, was widow of Francis Talbot, 11th Earl of Shrewsbury and notorious as mistress of the 2nd Duke of Buckingham. In doing so, he brought an action for jactitation of marriage against Ann Smith, a shopkeeper with whom he had been living for some years.

Brydges' wife bought him a post as Groom of the Bedchamber in 1678. He was appointed to the lieutenancy for Staffordshire in 1680 and stood for Parliament at Lichfield in the 1681 general election. Some time before 1685, he bought Avington Park and considerably remodelled the house. He entertained Charles II there while the King's house at Winchester was being built. On the accession of James II in 1685 he lost his post as Groom of the Bedchamber, but remained loyal to the King until the Glorious Revolution. Under William III he was Colonel of a Regiment of Hampshire Militia Foot in 1697.

Brydges was returned unopposed as Member of Parliament (MP) for Haslemere at the 1690 English general election, and again at the 1695 English general election. However he was defeated in a contest at the 1698 English general election. In the first general election of 1701 he was returned in a contest as MP for Winchester and was returned again in the second general election of 1701 and at the 1702 English general election. He was returned again at the 1705 English general election and voted for the Court candidate as Speaker on 25 October 1705, and supported the Court over the ‘place clause on 18 February 1706. At the 1708 British general election, he was returned as a Whig for Winchester. He was a teller for the Whigs and supported the naturalization of the Palatines in 1709 and the impeachment of Dr Sacheverell in 1710. He was returned unopposed as a Whig at the 1710 British general election but was less active in Parliament. He was returned again at the 1713 British general election.

Brydges developed gangrene after treating an ingrowing toenail just before the last election. He lingered on until 1714 and was buried on 9 February 1714 at St. Giles-in-the-Fields. He was succeeded by his son George.

Parliament of England
Preceded by White Tichborne; Denzil Onslow	Member of Parliament for Haslemere; 1690–1698; With: Denzil Onslow; George Woodroffe 1695	Succeeded by Sir Theophilus Oglethorpe; George Vernon
Preceded by Frederick Tylney; Lord William Powlett	Member of Parliament for Winchester; 1701–1707; With: Lord William Powlett	Succeeded by Parliament of Great Britain
Parliament of Great Britain
Preceded by Parliament of England	Member of Parliament for Winchester; 1707–1714; With: Lord William Powlett 1701-1710; Thomas Lewis 1710-1714	Succeeded by George Brydges; John Popham
