= Roger Hope Elletson =

Jamaican planter

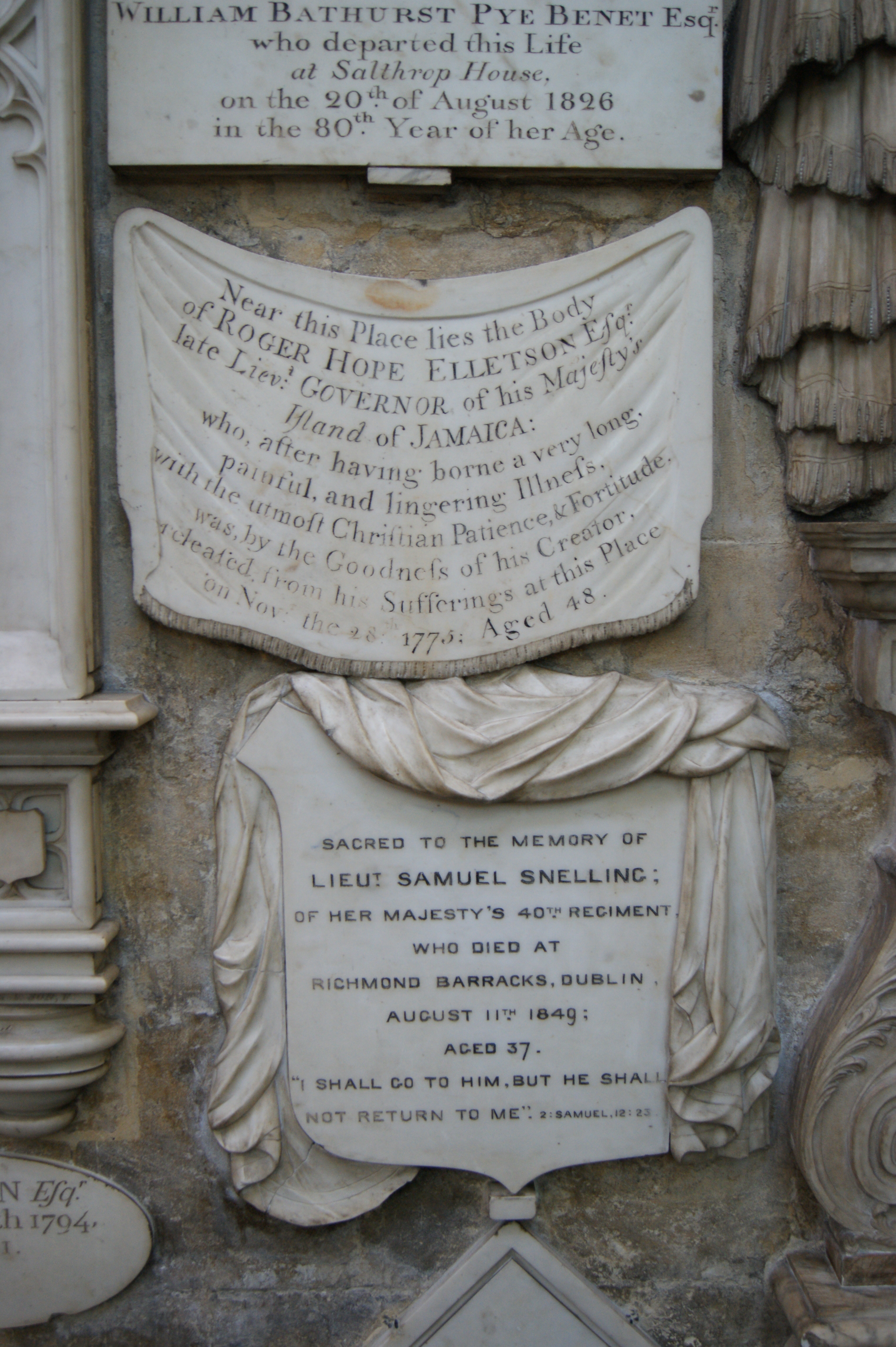
Elletson's memorial tablet (middle) at Bath Abbey

Roger Hope Elletson (1727 — 28 November 1775) was a Jamaican planter and politician who was Lieutenant Governor of Jamaica from 1767 to 1768.

== Early life ==
Roger was the younger son of Richard and Susanna Elletson. The family owned the Hope Estate near Kingston, one of the first sugar plantations in Jamaica.

He was educated at Eton College and went on to Trinity College, Cambridge, matriculating in 1746.

== Planter and politician ==
Roger Hope Elletson returned to Jamaica and is recorded as the owner of an estate called "Merrymans Hill" in St Andrew, Jamaica, which spanned 600 acres. By 1753, he owned 93 slaves. In the 1760s his brother and his mother died, leaving him in possession of the Hope Estate.

He also pursued a political career and was elected as a Member of the House of Assembly for Port Royal. Then in 1757, he was appointed to the Royal Council. Elletson served as Lieutenant Governor of Jamaica from 1767 to 1768.

As governor, Elletson played a role in preventing Accompong from taking control of Trelawny Town, thus creating a united Leeward Maroon community. After Cudjoe died in 1764, Accompong tried to take control of Trelawny Town. Elletson asserted authority over the Leeward Maroons, instructing Superintendent John James to take the Trelawny Town badge of authority away from Accompong, and to give it to a Trelawny Town Maroon officer named Lewis.

Elletson died when on a visit to Bath, England in 1775. He was survived by his wife Anna, who inherited the Hope Estate and married in 1777 James Brydges, 3rd Duke of Chandos.
