= Anthony Henley (died 1748) =

British politician

- Born: c. 1704
- Died: 1748
- Occupation: Politician

Anthony Henley (c. 1704–1748), of the Grange, near Alresford, Hampshire, was a British politician who sat in the House of Commons from 1727 to 1734.

Henley was the eldest son of Anthony Henley, MP of the Grange, Northington, Hampshire and his wife Mary Bertie, daughter of Hon. Peregrine Bertie of Waldershare, Kent. In 1711 he succeeded his father to the manors of Northington and Swarraton, known as the Grange. He also inherited his father’s waggish humour. He matriculated at Christ Church, Oxford on 21 March 1720, aged 15.

Soon after coming of age, Henley was returned as Member of Parliament for Southampton at the 1727 British general election. There were no recorded votes by him before1733. That year, the Southampton corporation asked their representatives to oppose the Excise Bill. He did vote against the bill, although a version of a reply to the corporation berating them for their impudence and refusing to follow their instructions was published, probably as a joke of his own making. Later, he voted against the Administration on the repeal of the Septennial Act. At the 1734 British general election, general election there was a double return for Southampton, on which the House of Commons awarded the seat to John Conduitt. Henley did not stand again.

On 11 February 1728, Henley married Lady Elizabeth Berkeley, daughter of James Berkeley, 3rd Earl of Berkeley. The letter-writer Mary Delaney reported of the occasion that Lady Betty Berkeley ...... being almost 15 has thought it time to be married and ran away last week with Mr. Henley, a man noted for his impudence and immorality but a good estate and a beau. Henley died without issue on 24 December 1748.

Parliament of Great Britain
Preceded by Thomas Lewis; Thomas Missing	Member of Parliament for Southampton; 1727–1734; With: Robert Eyre; Sir William Heathcote 1729	Succeeded by Sir William Heathcote; John Conduitt
