= Robert Eyre (died 1752) =

Robert Eyre (c.1693–1752), of Newhouse, Wiltshire, was a British lawyer and politician who sat in the House of Commons from 1727 to 1729.

Eyre was the eldest son of Sir Robert Eyre, MP, of Newhouse, and his wife Elizabeth Rudge, daughter of Edward Rudge of Warley, Essex. He was admitted at Lincoln's Inn in 1710 and called to the bar in 1723. He married Mary Fellowes, daughter of William Fellowes of Eggesford, Devon.

Eyre succeeded his father as Recorder of Southampton in 1723, holding the post until 1742. At the 1727 British general election, he was returned as Member of Parliament for Southampton. He voted with the Administration on the civil list arrears in 1729. In May 1729, he vacated his seat on being appointed a commissioner of excise. He was elected one of the trustees of the Georgia Society on 21 March 1734. In 1735 he succeeded his father to Newhouse. He became a common councillor of the Georgia Society on 17 March 1737.

Eyre died on 14 December 1752, leaving one son.

Parliament of Great Britain
Preceded by Thomas Lewis; Thomas Missing	Member of Parliament for Southampton; 1727–1729; With: Anthony Henley	Succeeded by Sir William Heathcote; Anthony Henley
