= John Goddard (MP) =

British Whig politician

John Goddard (5 December 1682 – 1736) was a British Whig politician who sat in the House of Commons from 1727 to 1736.

Goddard was the fourth son of Thomas Goddard, of Nun's Court, Coleman St., London, director of Bank of England from 1694 to 1700, and his wife Elizabeth Shallcross, daughter of Humphrey Shallcross of Digswell, Hertfordshire. He became a merchant trading with Portugal. He married Anne Simondi, widow of a, Swedish consul at Lisbon and sister of Joseph Gulston.

Goddard was returned as a Whig Member of Parliament for Tregony at the 1727 British general election. He voted with the Administration on the arrears of the civil list in 1729 and on the Hessians in 1730. He was appointed Commissary for settling merchants’ losses with Spain in 1730. He left England for Seville on a government mission in June 1731, receiving an allowance of £1,825 p.a. during his negotiations with the Spanish commissioners. He was concerned that Lord Falmouth was undermining his interest at Tregony during his absence, and in November 1732 he applied for leave to come home. On his return to England, he voted with the Administration in March 1734 against the repeal of the Septennial Act. At the 1734 British general election he was returned with his son-in-law, Henry Penton. In 1734 he became assistant to the Royal African Company.

Goddard died 5 July 1736, leaving £20,000 to his wife.

Parliament of Great Britain
| Preceded by James Cooke; John Merrill | Member of Parliament for Tregony; 1727–1736; With: Thomas Smith 1727-1729; Matthew Ducie Moreton 1729-1734; Henry Penton 1734-1736 | Succeeded by Henry Penton; Sir Robert Cowan |
