= Sir Paulet St John, 1st Baronet =

British Member of Parliament (1704–1780)

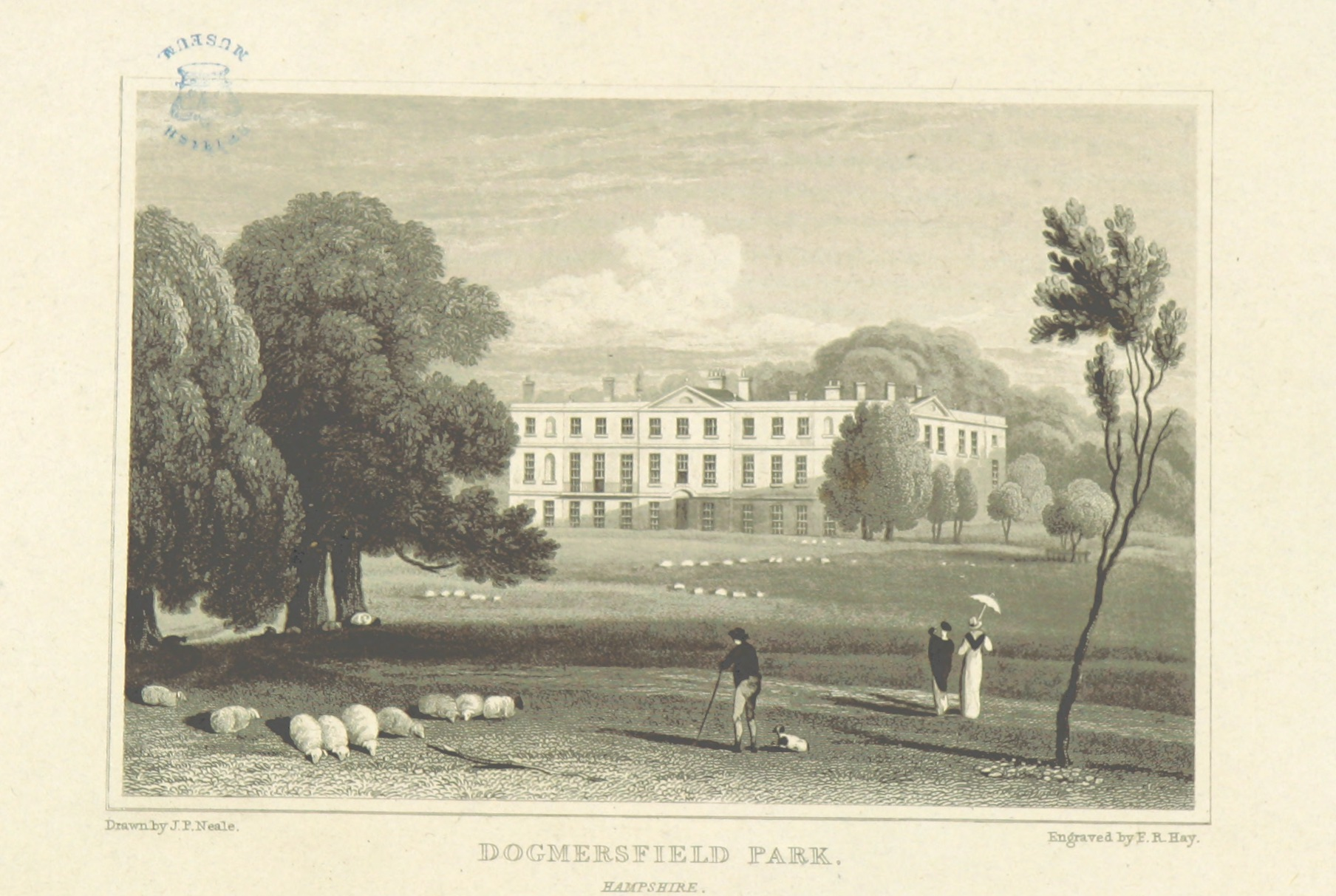
Dogmersfield House, completed by Paulet St John in 1729

Sir Paulet St John, 1st Baronet (7 April 1704 – 8 June 1780) was a British politician who sat in the House of Commons between 1734 and 1754.

== Life ==
He was born the eldest son of Ellis St John (formerly Mews) of Farley Chamberlayne by his second wife Martha, the daughter and eventually heiress of Edward Goodyear of Dogmersfield Park, Dogmersfield, Hampshire. He was educated at Oriel College, Oxford (1722) and inherited his father's estates in 1729. He completed the building, started by his father, of the new house at Dogmersfield.

He hunted and owned racehorses. In September 1733 whilst out hunting on a horse he later named Beware Chalk Pit he leaped into a chalk pit 25ft (7.6m) deep. Horse and rider survived unharmed and the following year Beware Chalk Pit won the Hunters Plate on Worthy Downs. A monument was erected to commemorate these events at Farley Mount.

He was picked High Sheriff of Hampshire for 1727–28, appointed woodward of the New Forest in 1764 and elected Mayor of Winchester for 1772–73. He was also created a Baronet in 1772.

He was returned to Parliament as the member for Winchester in 1734, sitting until 1741. He was elected to serve Hampshire from 1741 to 1747 and Winchester again from 1751 to 1754.

He died in 1780.

== Family ==
He married three times: firstly Elizabeth, the daughter of Sir James Rushout, 2nd Baronet, MP, of Northwick Park, Worcestershire; secondly Mary, the daughter of John Waters of Brecon and the widow of Sir Halswell Tynte, 3rd Baronet, with whom he had 3 sons; and thirdly Jane, the daughter and heiress of R. Harris of Silkstead, Hampshire and widow of William Pescod of Winchester. He was succeeded in the baronetcy by his son Henry.

== See also ==
- St John baronets

Parliament of Great Britain
Preceded by George Brydges; Norton Powlett	Member of Parliament for Winchester; 1734–1741; With: George Brydges	Succeeded by George Brydges; William Powlett
Preceded by Lord Harry Powlett; Edward Lisle	Member of Parliament for Hampshire; 1741–1747; With: Lord Harry Powlett	Succeeded by Lord Harry Powlett; Francis Withed
Preceded by George Brydges; Henry Penton	Member of Parliament for Winchester; 1751–1754; With: Henry Penton	Succeeded by James Brydges; Henry Penton
Baronetage of Great Britain
New creation	Baronet (of Farley); 1772-1780	Succeeded by Henry St John
