= Charles Hanses =

17th-century English politician

Charles Hanses (c. 1659 – c. 1697) was a Member of Parliament for Winchester from 1685 to 1689.

Hanses was the eldest son of John Hanses of Selby and York, Yorkshire. He was educated at Archbishop Holgate's School in York. He matriculated at Magdalene College, Cambridge, in 1677, aged 17, and attended St John's College, Cambridge. He entered Gray's Inn in 1681 and was called to the bar in 1683.
