= James Brydges, 3rd Duke of Chandos =

English politician (1731–1789)

His Grace The Duke of Chandos
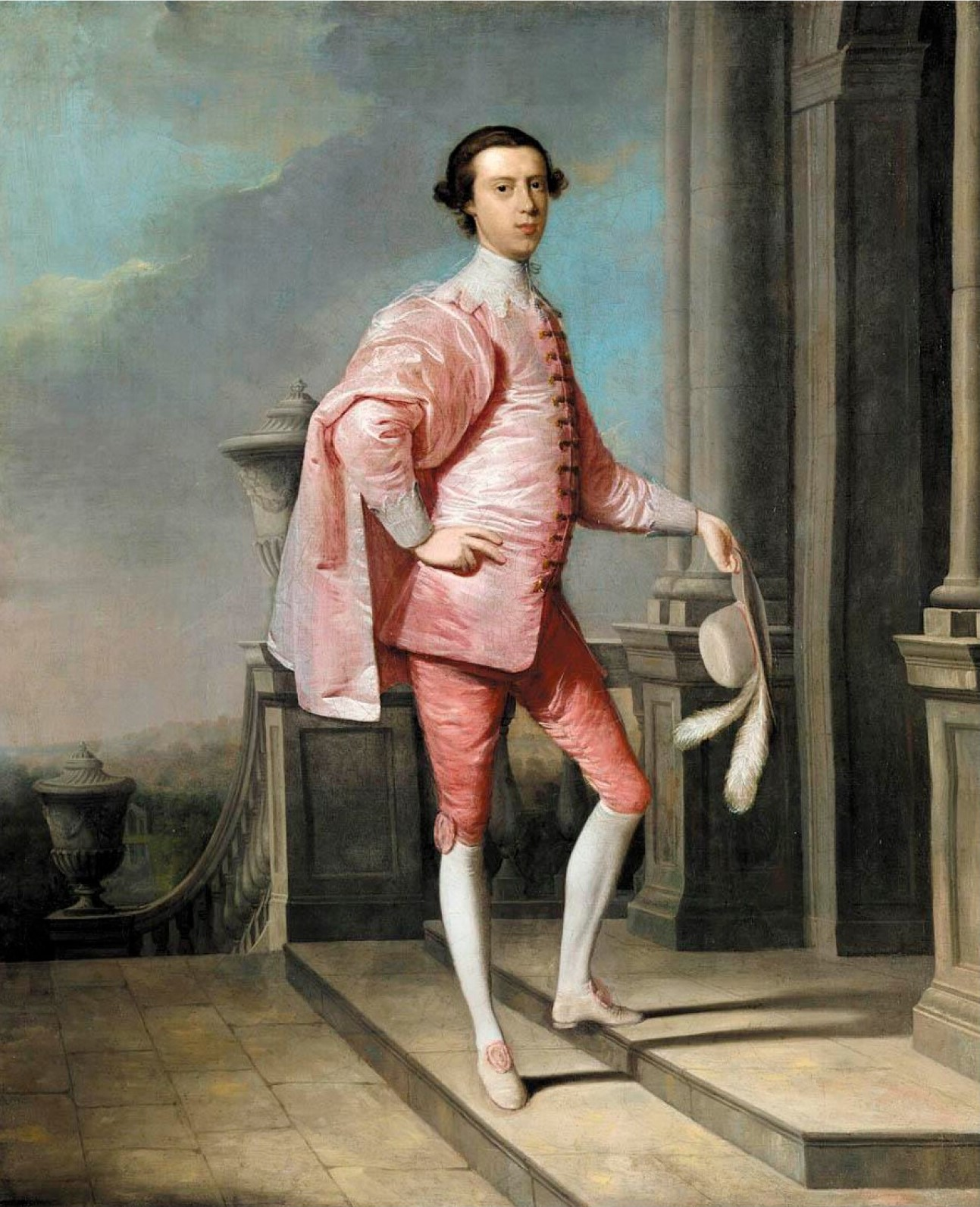
- 1750 portrait by Arthur Devis

Member of Parliament for Winchester
- In office 1754–1761 Serving with Henry Penton
- Preceded by: Henry Penton; Paulet St John
- Succeeded by: Lord Harry Powlett; Henry Penton

Member of Parliament for Radnorshire
- In office 1761–1768
- Preceded by: Howell Gwynne
- Succeeded by: Chase Price

Personal details
- Born: 27 December 1731
- Died: 29 September 1789 (aged 57)
- Resting place: St Lawrence Whitchurch, London
- Party: Whig
- Spouse(s): Margaret Nicol (m. 1753; died 1768) Anne Eliza Gamon (m. 1777)
- Parents: Henry Brydges (father); Lady Mary Bruce (mother)
- Relatives: Charles Bruce (maternal grandfather); Lady Anne Elizabeth Brydges (daughter); Richard Temple-Grenville (grandson)
- Education: Westminster School
- Alma mater: Göttingen University

James Brydges, 3rd Duke of Chandos, PC (27 December 1731 – 29 September 1789), styled Viscount Wilton from 1731 to 1744 and Marquess of Carnarvon from 1744 to 1771, was an English politician.

== Background ==
Chandos was the only son of Henry Brydges, 2nd Duke of Chandos, and Lady Mary Bruce, daughter of Charles Bruce, 3rd Earl of Ailesbury. He was educated at Westminster School from 1742 to 1749, and then at Göttingen University in 1750/1751.

== Political career ==
Chandos was Member of Parliament for Winchester from 1754 to 1761 and for Radnorshire between 1761 and 1768. He succeeded in the dukedom upon the death of his father on 28 November 1771.

He was a Gentleman of the Bedchamber to George, Prince of Wales from 1760 to 1764, the Lord Lieutenant of Hampshire in 1763–64 and 1771–80, sworn to the Privy Council on 12 May 1775 and appointed Lord Steward of the Household from December 1783 to his death in 1789.

== Private life ==
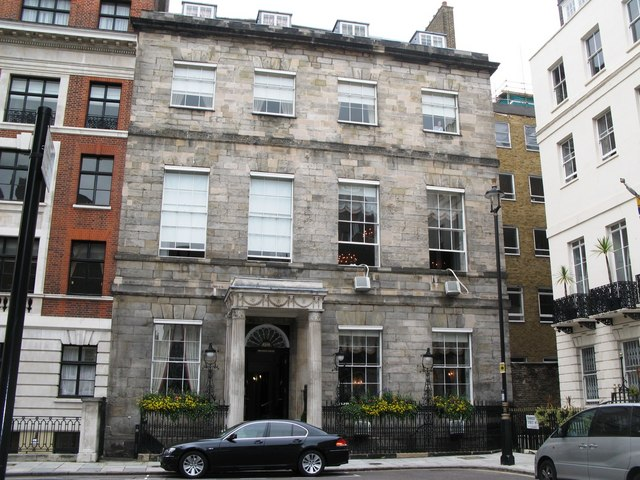
Chandos House, Marylebone, London

Chandos's first marriage was to Margaret Nicol (1736–1768), daughter of John Nicol of Colney Hatch and Minchenden House, and his wife Winifred Keck, on 22 March 1753. They set up a London home at 39 Upper Grosvenor Street, Mayfair. Margaret inherited much of the great fortune acquired by her grandfather Sir Anthony Keck, and was the owner of a famous portrait of Shakespeare, which came to be known as the Chandos portrait following the marriage.

A decade after the death of his first wife, and having become Duke of Chandos in 1771, he married Anne Eliza Gamon, daughter of Richard Gamon of Datchworth Bury, Datchworth, on 21 June 1777. This second marriage produced the only child to survive to adulthood, Lady Anne Elizabeth Brydges (Lady Kinloss, died 1836) who married Richard Temple-Grenville, 1st Duke of Buckingham and Chandos. They were the parents of Richard Temple-Nugent-Brydges-Chandos-Grenville, 2nd Duke of Buckingham and Chandos.

Chandos died in September 1789, aged 57, when the Dukedom became extinct. He was buried in St Lawrence Whitchurch in Canons Park, London. His widow was declared a lunatic and confined to their London home, Chandos House. She was also made a ward of court. There was a lengthy lawsuit in the Irish Courts over the management of her property. In 1794 judge Richard Power, accountant-general and usher of the Court of Chancery, was accused of misappropriating some of the duchess's income and died in a presumed suicide.

Parliament of Great Britain
Preceded by Henry Penton; Paulet St John	Member of Parliament for Winchester; 1754–1761; With: Henry Penton	Succeeded by Lord Harry Powlett; Henry Penton
Preceded by Howell Gwynne	Member of Parliament for Radnorshire; 1761–1768	Succeeded by Chase Price
Political offices
Preceded by The Earl of Dartmouth	Lord Steward; 1783–1789	Succeeded by The Duke of Dorset
Honorary titles
Preceded by The Duke of Bolton	Lord Lieutenant of Hampshire; 1763–1764	Succeeded by The Earl of Northington
Preceded by The Earl of Northington	Lord Lieutenant of Hampshire; 1771–1780	Succeeded by The Lord Rivers
Masonic offices
Preceded by The Lord Carysfort	Grand Master of the Premier Grand Lodge of England; 1754–1757	Succeeded by Lord Aberdour
Peerage of Great Britain
Preceded by Henry Brydges	Duke of Chandos; 1771–1789	Extinct
Peerage of England
Preceded by Henry Brydges	Baron Chandos; 2nd creation 1771–1789	Dormant
Peerage of Scotland
Preceded by Charles Bruce	Lord Kinloss; 1747–1789	Succeeded by Anne Elizabeth Temple-Nugent-Brydges-Chandos-Grenville
