= Richard Power (Monaghan politician) =

Irish politician, barrister and judge

Richard Power (c. 1732–1794) was an Irish politician, barrister and judge of the late eighteenth century. He sat in the Irish House of Commons from 1767 to 1772, and was then appointed a Baron of the Court of Exchequer (Ireland). He was also Usher and Accountant-General of the Court of Chancery (Ireland). In his role as Accountant-General, he was accused of illegally enriching himself, and the resulting charge of corruption led to his death by suicide in 1794.

== Career ==
He was born in County Tipperary in about 1733, one of the three sons of John Power of Barretstown and Elizabeth Congreve, daughter of the Reverend John Congreve of Kilmacow, County Kilkenny and Rebecca Jones, and granddaughter of the Cromwellian army officer and politician Oliver Jones MP. He entered the Middle Temple in 1752, was called to the Irish Bar in 1757 and took silk in 1768. He was granted an honorary doctorate of law by the University of Dublin in 1769.

He entered the House of Commons as MP for Monaghan in 1767, and sat as MP for Tuam from 1768 to 1772. He was a highly intelligent man and an able pamphleteer, but his manner was notably eccentric. His speeches in Parliament were often so emotional and so badly phrased that they provoked derisive laughter from his critics. His theatrical manner led the wits to nickname him "Don Riccardo". He was described as "morose, very learned, rich and ostentatious". He became second Baron of the Irish Court of Exchequer in 1772.

He was an excellent and careful judge. Probably the most notable trial he presided at was of the eccentric landowner George Robert FitzGerald, who, together with his law agent Timothy Brecknock, was charged in 1786 with conspiracy to murder an attorney, Patrick Randall McDonnell, with whom he had a long-standing quarrel. FitzGerald was found guilty and hanged (as was Brecknock), although Power had some doubts about the conduct of the prosecution's case, and clashed in open Court with counsel for the prosecution, John Fitzgibbon, thereby making a powerful enemy for the future.

== Disgrace ==
His highly successful career came to a tragic end in 1794, due to his alleged misconduct as Accountant-General of the Court of Chancery, a post to which he had been appointed in 1763, and which he continued to hold after he became a judge. This office entitled him to have personal charge of all funds lodged in the Court of Chancery in pending lawsuits.

A lengthy lawsuit having concluded concerning the administration of the property of the widowed Anna Eliza Brydges, Duchess of Chandos, who was insane and had been made a ward of Court, the successful party claimed the interest on the sum due to him. The sum was estimated at £3000, a small fortune at the time. Power declined to pay the interest, saying that the claimant was only entitled to the principal, and that as Accountant, he was entitled to retain the interest. The claimant appealed to the Lord Chancellor of Ireland, John FitzGibbon, 1st Earl of Clare. The Chancellor took a serious view of the matter and ordered Power to appear personally before him to account for his conduct, in language calculated to cause Power the maximum embarrassment. Power strongly objected to the order, saying that it was beneath his dignity to answer to another judge, particularly one who though technically senior to him in rank had not even been called to the Bar when Power became a judge (the two men had already clashed at the FitzGerald trial in 1786, where the Chancellor had been counsel for the prosecution). The Chancellor was inflexible and gave Power just five days to appear before him. Rumours began to circulate that Power had accumulated his considerable fortune by improperly retaining other funds in a similar fashion.

== Suicide ==
Power had always been eccentric (his opponents in the House of Commons had accused him of talking in the House like a "Bedlamite" i.e. a lunatic). The fear of professional disgrace, which would inevitably be followed by his removal from the Bench, is believed to have preyed on his mind to the point where he became mentally unstable. A wild rumour went round the town that he had tried but failed to murder the Lord Chancellor. The story seems to have no foundation in fact, but the fact that it was told at all is an indication of the state of Power's mental health at the end of his life. He was found drowned in the River Liffey at Irishtown early in 1794: legend had it that he carried an umbrella on his last journey to keep himself dry. The inquest recorded a verdict of accidental death (thus entitling him to a Christian burial, which was forbidden to those who wilfully took their own lives). No contemporary doubted that it was actually a case of suicide. FitzGibbon was accused by his enemies of driving Power to the fatal act, but the Chancellor's friends insisted that there was strong evidence that Power had acted improperly, and that he was the author of his own downfall.

Whether by honest means or not, he had acquired a large fortune, which passed to his nephew. He never married.

== Sources ==
- The Annual Register for the Year 1794
- Ball, F. Elrington The Judges in Ireland 1221-1921 London John Murray 1926
- Baratariana- a select collection of fugitive political pieces, published during the administration of Lord Townshend in Ireland 3rd Edition Dublin 1797
- Geoghegan, Patrick M. "Power, Richard" Cambridge Dictionary of Irish Biography
