= William Powlett (MP) =

British landowner and Whig politician

Powlett arms

William Powlett (1693–1757), of Chilbolton and Easton, Hampshire, was an 18th-century English landowner and Whig politician, who sat as a Member of Parliament in the House of Commons between 1729 and 1757.

== Life ==
Powlett was educated at Wadham College, Oxford, matriculating on 27 October 1710, aged 17.

Mayor of Lymington for 1718/19 and 1721/22, he succeeded to the estates of his father, Lord William Powlett, upon his decease in 1729.

Powlett was returned as Member of Parliament for Lymington on the interest of his cousin, Charles Powlett, 3rd Duke of Bolton, at a contested by-election 13 May 1729. He supported HM Government until 1734, when he followed the Duke of Bolton into Opposition, voting against the Government on the repeal of the Septennial Act. He stood unsuccessfully for Winchester at the 1734 British general election but was returned at the 1741 British general election after a contest. Voting against the Government until 1746, Powlett supported the Hanoverian Dress Act (1746), then being defeated as MP for Winchester at the 1747 British general election and again at a by-election in 1751.

At the 1754 British general election, Powlett was returned unopposed for Whitchurch on the interest of his brother-in-law, John Wallop, 1st Earl of Portsmouth.

== Family ==
The elder surviving son of Lord William Powlett by his first wife Louise de Caumont, daughter of Armand de Caumont, Marquis de Montpouillon, and granddaughter of Henri de Caumont, 3rd Duc de La Force, he succeeded to his father's estates in 1729.

On 10 February 1721, Powlett married Lady Annabella Bennet (died 1769), daughter of Charles, 1st Earl of Tankerville KT, having (with a son and daughter):

- William Powlett, died unmarried vp
- Annabella Powlett (1724-1761), married (as his first wife) Revd Richard Smyth, Vicar of Itchen and Crux Easton, Hampshire and Rector of Myddle, Shropshire, having had:
  - William Powlett Powlett, dsp 1821
  - Camilla Powlett (died 1820), married her cousin the Hon. and Revd Barton Wallop, Master of Magdalene College, Cambridge, having (with a daughter, Urania Wake):
    - Major William Barton Wallop (1781–1824), married Elizabeth Ward (died 1812), daughter of Major John Ward, leaving issue
  - Annabella Powlett, married Charles Townshend, 1st Baron Bayning, having issue, Henry William-Powlett, 3rd Baron Bayning.

His brother, Sir Charles Powlett, also served as an MP.

Parliament of Great Britain
Preceded by Lord Nassau Powlett; Anthony Morgan	Member of Parliament for Lymington; 1729–1734; With: Lord Nassau Powlett	Succeeded by Sir John Cope, Bt; Colonel Maurice Bocland
Preceded by George Brydges; Sir Paulet St John	Member of Parliament for Winchester; 1741–1747; With: George Brydges	Succeeded by George Brydges; Henry Penton
Preceded by Lord Robert Bertie; Charles Wallop	Member of Parliament for Whitchurch; 1754–1757; With: Thomas Townshend	Succeeded by George Jennings; Thomas Townshend
