= Norton Powlett (died 1759) =

British politician

Norton Powlett (c. 1705–1759), of Rotherfield Park, near Alton and Amport, Hampshire, was a British politician who sat in the House of Commons from 1730 to 1734.

Powlett was the eldest son of Norton Powlett MP of Rotherfield Park, near Alton and Amport, Hampshire and his wife Jane Morley, daughter of Sir Charles Morley of Droxford, Hampshire. He matriculated at Exeter College, Oxford on 17 December 1722, aged 17.

Powlett was returned as Member of Parliament for Winchester at a by-election on 26 January 1730 on the interest of Charles Powlett, 3rd Duke of Bolton. He voted against the Administration on the Hessians in 1730 but with them on the army in 1732. He voted for the Excise Bill in 1733 and abstained from the division on the repeal of the Septennial Act in 1734. He did not stand at the 1734 British general election.

Powlett became Sheriff of Southampton in 1738. In 1741 he succeeded his father to the family estates. He married Anne Chute, a widow on 20 January 1756. He died without issue on 14 March 1759.

Parliament of Great Britain
Preceded by George Brydges; Lord William Powlett	Member of Parliament for Winchester; 1730–1734; With: George Brydges	Succeeded by George Brydges; Paulet St John
