= Thomas Lewis (died 1736) =

British politician

Thomas Lewis (c. 1679 – 22 November 1736) of Soberton, Hampshire, was a British Tory and then Whig politician who sat in the House of Commons between 1708 and 1736 and a member of the Lewis Of the Van Family.

== Life ==
Lewis was the eldest surviving son of Richard Lewis, MP, of Edington and Corsham, Wiltshire and his wife Mary James. He attended Salisbury School and succeeded his father in 1706, inheriting estates at Corsham in Wiltshire and The Van in Glamorgan.

He married firstly Anna Maria Curll, daughter of Sir Walter Curll, 1st Baronet of Soberton. She died in 1709 and he married secondly in February 1710, Elizabeth Turnour of St. Martin-in-the-Fields, with whom he had a daughter. He lived at Soberton, which he inherited by his first marriage.

Lewis was returned as a Tory Member of Parliament (MP) for Whitchurch on 5 May 1708, but was unseated on petition on 21 December 1708. At the 1710 British general election, he was returned as MP for Winchester. He was then returned for Hampshire at the 1713 British general election.

At the 1715 British general election he was returned as Tory MP for Southampton and was returned again at the 1722 British general election. In 1726 he switched to supporting Walpole's ministry. He became MP for Salisbury at the 1727 British general election and then for Portsmouth at the 1734 British general election.

Lewis died on 22 November 1736, leaving his estates, which were heavily encumbered, to his only grandchild, Other Windsor, 4th Earl of Plymouth, with remainder successively to Sir Robert and Horace Walpole. His tomb in Soberton was sculpted by Peter Scheemakers. Notes from the parliamentary hearings show that family seat of St Fagans maintained previous entail conditions and was placed into a 2000 year testamentary trust.

Parliament of Great Britain
Preceded by Charles Wither; Richard Wollaston	Member of Parliament for Whitchurch; 1708; With: Frederick Tylney	Succeeded by Richard Wollaston; George Brydges
Preceded by Lord William Powlett; George Rodney Brydges	Member of Parliament for Winchester; 1710–1714; With: George Rodney Brydges	Succeeded by George Brydges; John Popham
Preceded by George Pitt; Sir Simeon Stuart	Member of Parliament for Hampshire; 1713–1715; With: Sir Anthony Sturt	Succeeded by George Pitt; John Wallop
Preceded by Roger Harris; Richard Fleming	Member of Parliament for Southampton; 1715–1727; With: Richard Fleming 1715–1722; Thomas Missing 1722–1727	Succeeded by Robert Eyre; Anthony Henley
Preceded by Anthony Duncombe; Francis Kenton	Member of Parliament for Salisbury; 1727–1734; With: Anthony Duncombe	Succeeded by Peter Bathurst; Henry Hoare
Preceded by Sir Charles Wager; Sir John Norris	Member of Parliament for Portsmouth; 1734–1736; With: Philip Cavendish	Succeeded by Philip Cavendish; Charles Stewart
