= William Powlett Powlett =

English landowner

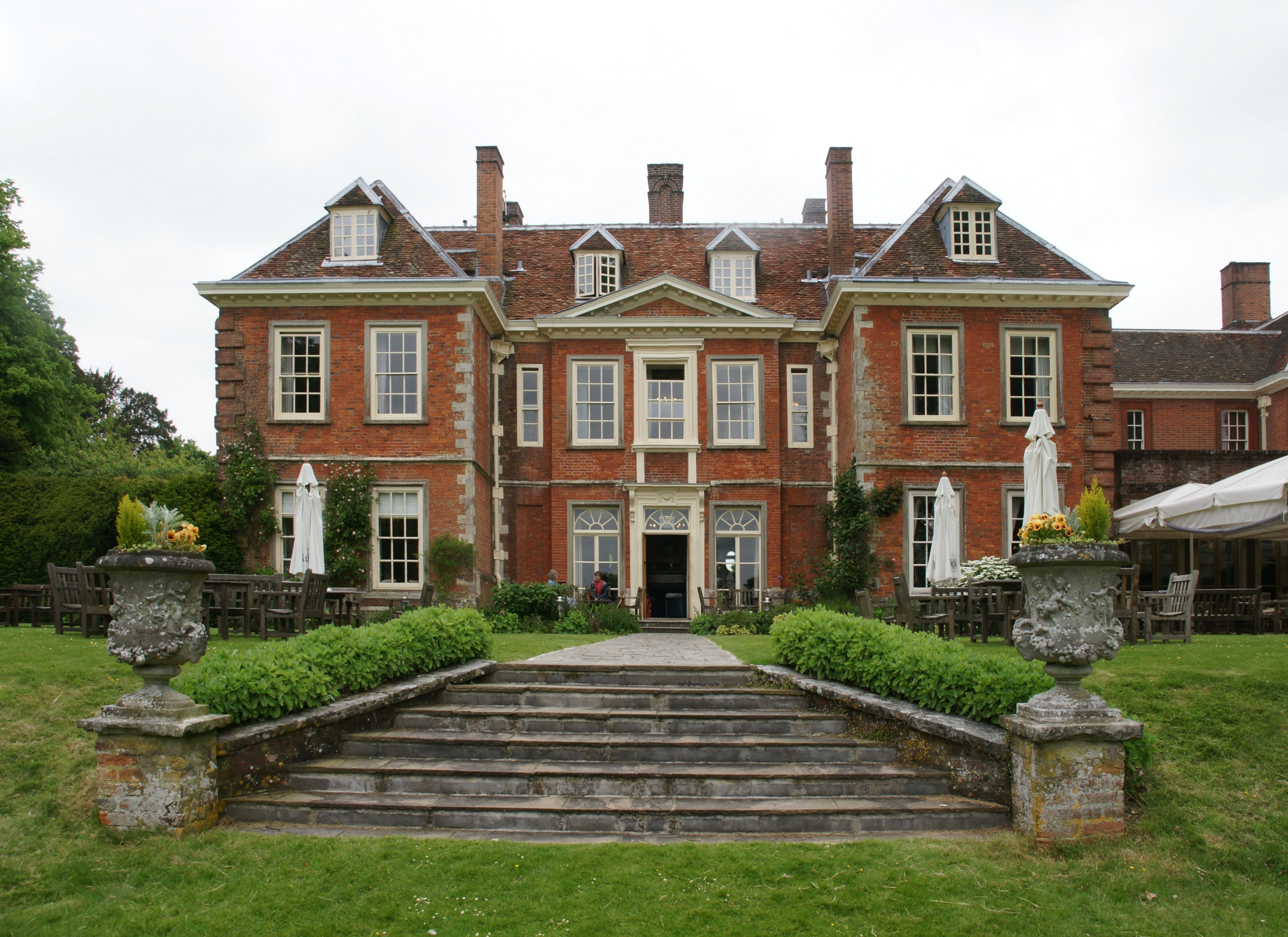
Lainston House in 2013

William Powlett Powlett (18 March 1758 – 8 March 1821) was an English landowner who lived at Lainston House in Hampshire in the south of England. He was high sheriff in 1783 and a member of Parliament (1790-1796).

== Biography ==
Powlett was born William Powlett Smyth, only son of the Rev. Richard Smyth, rector of Myddle, and his wife Annabella. He adopted the surname Powlett as heir to the Marrick estate of his maternal grandfather William Powlett. He was High Sheriff of Hampshire in 1783. A Whig, he sat in Parliament for Totnes from 1790 to 1796. He was married, but had no children, and his nephews Charles and Henry adopted the surname Powlett as his heirs.
