= 11th Parliament of Great Britain =

←	10th	12th	→
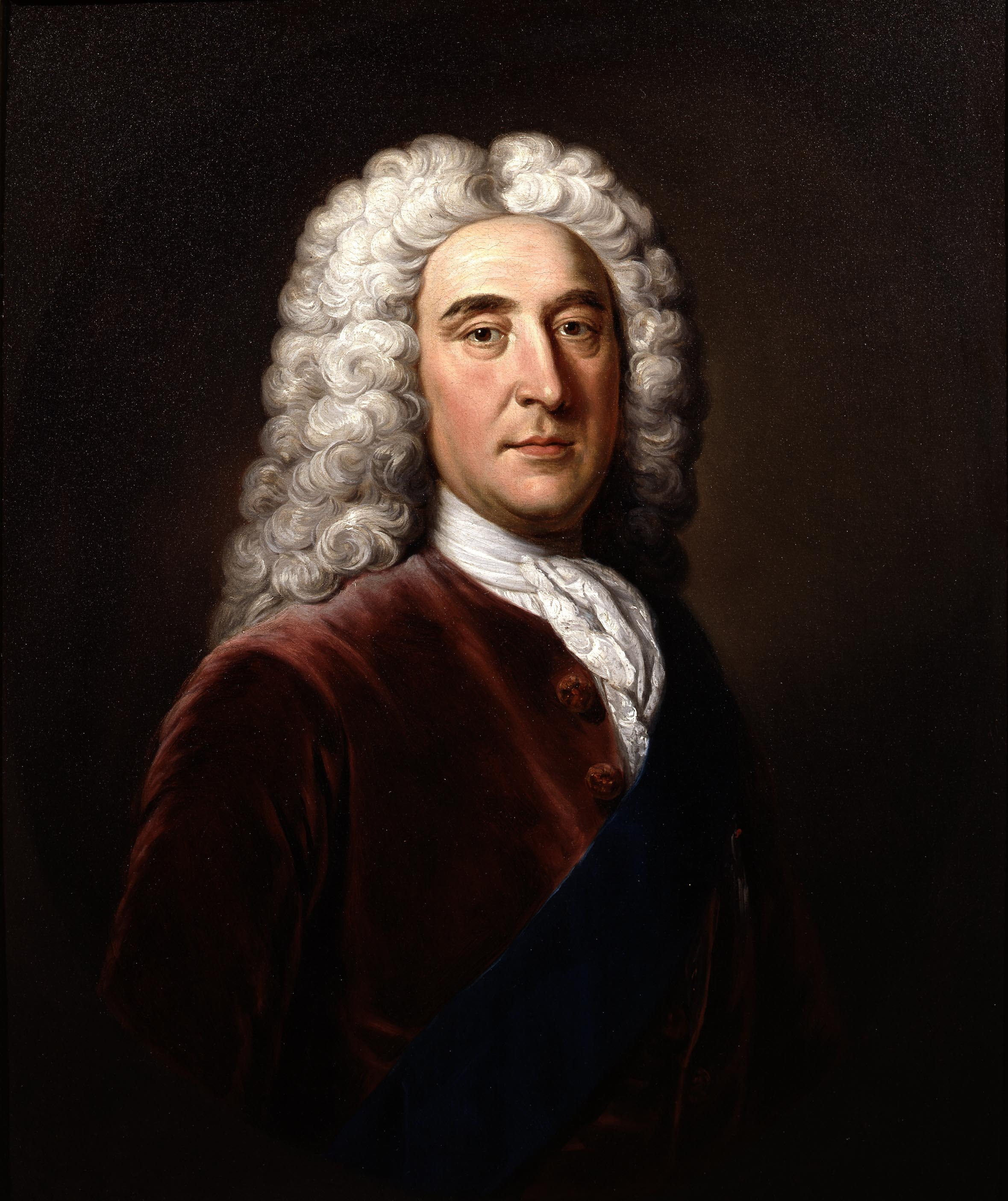
- Thomas Pelham-Holles, Duke of Newcastle was prime minister during most of the Eleventh Parliament

Overview
- Meeting place: Palace of Westminster
- Term: 31 May 1754 – 20 March 1761
- Election: 1754 general election
- Government: Newcastle I; Pitt–Devonshire; 1757 Caretaker; Pitt–Newcastle

House of Commons
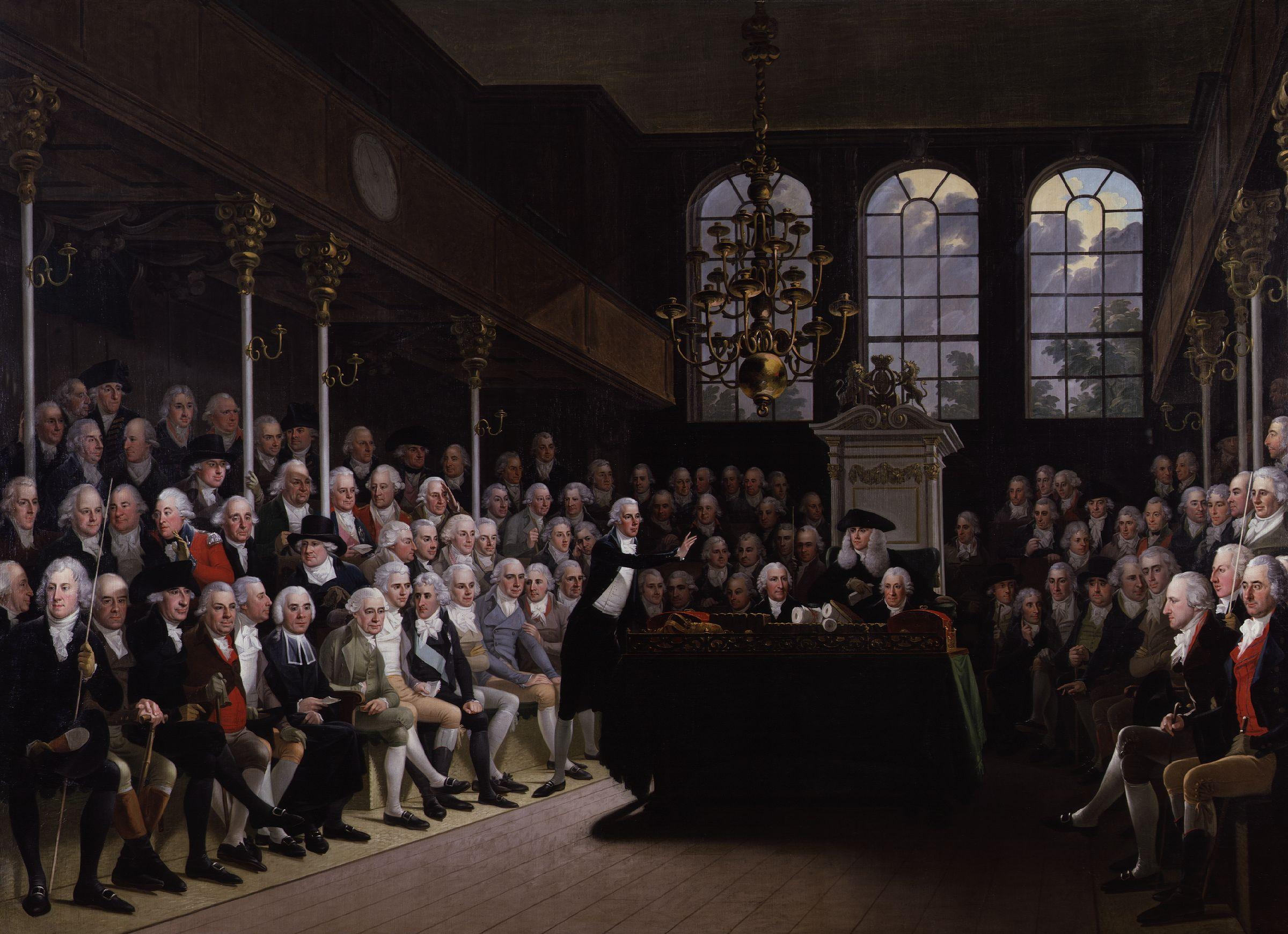
- Members: 558 MPs
- Speaker of the House of Commons: Arthur Onslow
- Leader of the House of Commons: Thomas Robinson; Henry Fox; William Pitt
- Party control: Whigs

House of Lords
- Lord Keeper of the Great Seal: Robert Henley, Earl of Northington
- Leader of the House of Lords: Duke of Newcastle; William Cavendish, Duke of Devonshire

Sessions
- 1st: 31 May 1754 – 5 June 1754
- 2nd: 14 November 1754 – 25 April 1755
- 3rd: 13 November 1755 – 27 May 1756
- 4th: 2 December 1756 – 4 June 1757
- 5th: 1 December 1757 – 20 June 1758
- 6th: 23 November 1758 – 2 June 1759
- 7th: 13 November 1759 – 22 May 1760
- 8th: 18 November 1760 – 19 March 1761

The Eleventh Parliament of Great Britain was the parliament of the Kingdom of Great Britain that sat from 31 May 1754 to 20 March 1761. It was assembled following the general elections held in April–May 1754.

== History ==
As with its predecessor, the Eleventh Parliament was an overwhelmingly Whig parliament. Traditional Whig–Tory party alignments had little meaning in the course of this parliament. Instead, political competition ran primarily between different Whig factions, such as the "Old Corps", Bedfordites, and Patriots.

There were several changes of ministries in the course of the Eleventh Parliament. Thomas Pelham-Holles, Duke of Newcastle's "Old Corps" Whigs assembled the first ministry, but had to accommodate the rise of the Bedfordite faction in late 1755 with several cabinet posts. Newcastle's ministry fell in late 1756, during the parliamentary recess, and the third session began with a new Bedfordite–Patriot Whig coalition in control. However, King George II could not brook them and fired them before the end of that session, placing the government in the hands of an interim caretaker ministry. More satisfactory to the king, Newcastle returned to power in coalition with William Pitt before the beginning of the fourth session in late 1757.

The Seven Years' War was fought for the duration of the Eleventh Parliament, and much of its legislation addressed the financing and conduct of the war.

== Officers ==
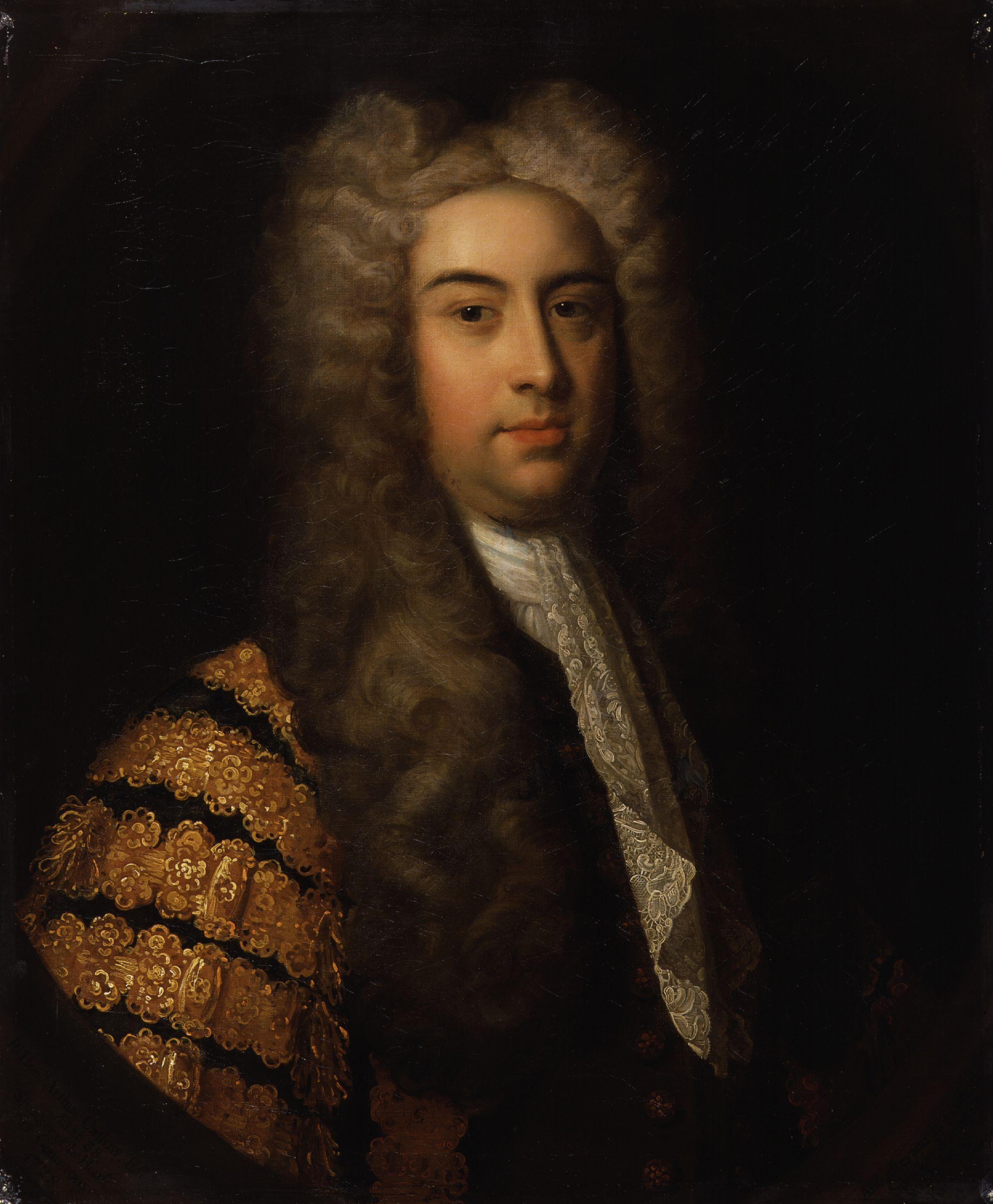
Arthur Onslow was Speaker of the House of Commons.

Surrey MP Arthur Onslow was Speaker of the House of Commons for the three prior parliaments, and had been re-elected to serve as speaker for the entire Eleventh Parliament.

In the Cabinet, the Secretary of the South served as the Leader of the House of Commons. The "Old Corps" Whig Thomas Robinson held that office until late 1755, when the Bedfordite Henry Fox replaced him. In 1756, William Pitt took and held that position until the end of the parliament.

The Prime Minister of Great Britain was Leader of the House of Lords during this parliament, namely Newcastle from 1756 to 1757, Devonshire briefly from 1756 to 1757, and Newcastle again from 1756 to 1761.

== Sessions ==
The Eleventh Parliament went through eight sessions. Its first session opened on 31 May 1754 for only a few days for formalities, and passed no public act. Thereafter, parliamentary sessions usually opened in November and ran for around six months. They were in recess for the subsequent half of the year. Parliament was not immediately dissolved with the death of King George II (25 October 1760) but rather met for an additional eighth and final session that November, opened by the new King George III. The Eleventh Parliament was finally dissolved on 25 April 1761, and new elections called.

By tradition, a parliament passes only one public "act" per session, albeit an act with multiple chapters. Legal statutes are cited by parliamentary session labelled by the regnal year in which that session sat: thus, for example, the British Museum Act 1753 (26 Geo 2 ch 22). The regnal year of George II began on 11 June, and thus most parliamentary sessions do not overlap regnal years (and thereby do not need a double citation). As this parliament was the first new parliament assembled after the calendar reform went into effect in 1752, there is no citation conflict between legal dates and common dates.

The session dates in the table below follow Cobbett's Parliamentary History (Cobbett 1813). The legal titles of the sessions are as given in common compilations, such as the Statutes at Large (Pickering 1766). For the specific acts of parliament passed in each session, see the list of acts of the Parliament of Great Britain.

Session	Label	Start	End	Note
1st Session	27 & 28 Geo. 2	31 May 1754	5 June 1754	no public acts
2nd Session	28 Geo. 2	14 November 1754	25 April 1755	
3rd Session	29 Geo. 2	13 November 1755	27 May 1756	
4th Session	30 Geo. 2	2 December 1756	4 June 1757	
5th Session	31 Geo. 2	1 December 1757	20 June 1758	
6th Session	32 Geo. 2	23 November 1758	2 June 1759	
7th Session	33 Geo. 2	13 November 1759	22 May 1760	death of George II (25 October) during recess
8th Session	1 Geo. 3	18 November 1760	19 March 1761	opened by George III
8th Session	1 Geo. 3	18 November 1760	19 March 1761	Parliament dissolved 20 March 1761

== See also ==
- List of parliaments of Great Britain
- List of acts of the 1st session of the 11th Parliament of Great Britain
- List of acts of the 2nd session of the 11th Parliament of Great Britain
- List of acts of the 3rd session of the 11th Parliament of Great Britain
- List of acts of the 4th session of the 11th Parliament of Great Britain
- List of acts of the 5th session of the 11th Parliament of Great Britain
- List of acts of the 6th session of the 11th Parliament of Great Britain
- List of acts of the 7th session of the 11th Parliament of Great Britain
- List of acts of the 8th session of the 11th Parliament of Great Britain

Preceded by 10th Parliament	11th Parliament of Great Britain; 1754–1761	Succeeded by 12th Parliament
