= Newcastle ministry =

Newcastle ministry may refer to:

- Pelham–Newcastle ministry, the British government under Henry Pelham and the Duke of Newcastle (1744–1754)
- First Newcastle ministry, the British government led by the Duke of Newcastle (1754–1756)
- Second Newcastle ministry, the British government led by the Duke of Newcastle (1757–1762)
