= List of parliaments of Great Britain =

List of sessions of the Parliament of Great Britain

This is a listing of sessions of the Parliament of Great Britain, tabulated with the elections to the House of Commons of Great Britain for each session, and the list of members of the House.

The sessions are numbered from the formation of the Kingdom of Great Britain. For later Westminster parliaments, see List of parliaments of the United Kingdom, and for earlier ones, see List of parliaments of England and List of parliaments of Scotland.

Monarch	Number	Start date	Election	Members	First Lord(s) of the Treasury	Party
Anne	1st	1707	none - co-opted	MPs		
Anne	2nd	1708	election	MPs		Whig
Anne	3rd	1710	election	MPs		Tory
Anne	4th	1713	election	MPs		Tory
George I	5th	1715	election	MPs	Charles Montagu, 1st Earl of Halifax; Charles Howard, 3rd Earl of Carlisle; Robert Walpole	Whig
George I	6th	1722	election	MPs	Robert Walpole	Whig
George II	7th	1727	election	MPs	Robert Walpole	Whig
George II	8th	1734	election	MPs	Robert Walpole	Whig
George II	9th	1741	election	MPs	Robert Walpole; Spencer Compton, 1st Earl of Wilmington; Henry Pelham	Whig
George II	10th	1747	election	MPs	Henry Pelham	Whig
George II	11th	1754	election	MPs	Thomas Pelham-Holles, 1st Duke of Newcastle; William Cavendish, 4th Duke of Devonshire; Duke of Newcastle	Whig
George III	12th	1761	election	MPs	Duke of Newcastle; John Stuart, 3rd Earl of Bute; George Grenville; Charles Watson-Wentworth, 2nd Marquess of Rockingham; William Pitt, 1st Earl of Chatham	Whig
George III	13th	1768	election	MPs	Augustus Henry Fitzroy, 3rd Duke of Grafton; Frederick North, Lord North	Whig
George III	14th	1774	election	MPs	Lord North	Tory
George III	15th	1780	election	MPs	Lord North; Marquess of Rockingham; William Petty, 2nd Earl of Shelburne; William Cavendish-Bentinck, 3rd Duke of Portland; William Pitt the Younger	Tory
George III	16th	1784	election	MPs	William Pitt the Younger	Tory
George III	17th	1790	election	MPs	William Pitt the Younger	Tory
George III	18th	1796	election	MPs	William Pitt the Younger; Henry Addington	Tory

== See also ==
- Duration of English parliaments before 1660
- Duration of English, British and United Kingdom parliaments from 1660
- List of parliaments of England
- List of parliaments of Scotland
- List of parliaments of the United Kingdom
- List of British governments
