= 1757 caretaker ministry =

Government of Great Britain

Devonshire caretaker ministry
- Cabinet of Great Britain
- April – June 1757
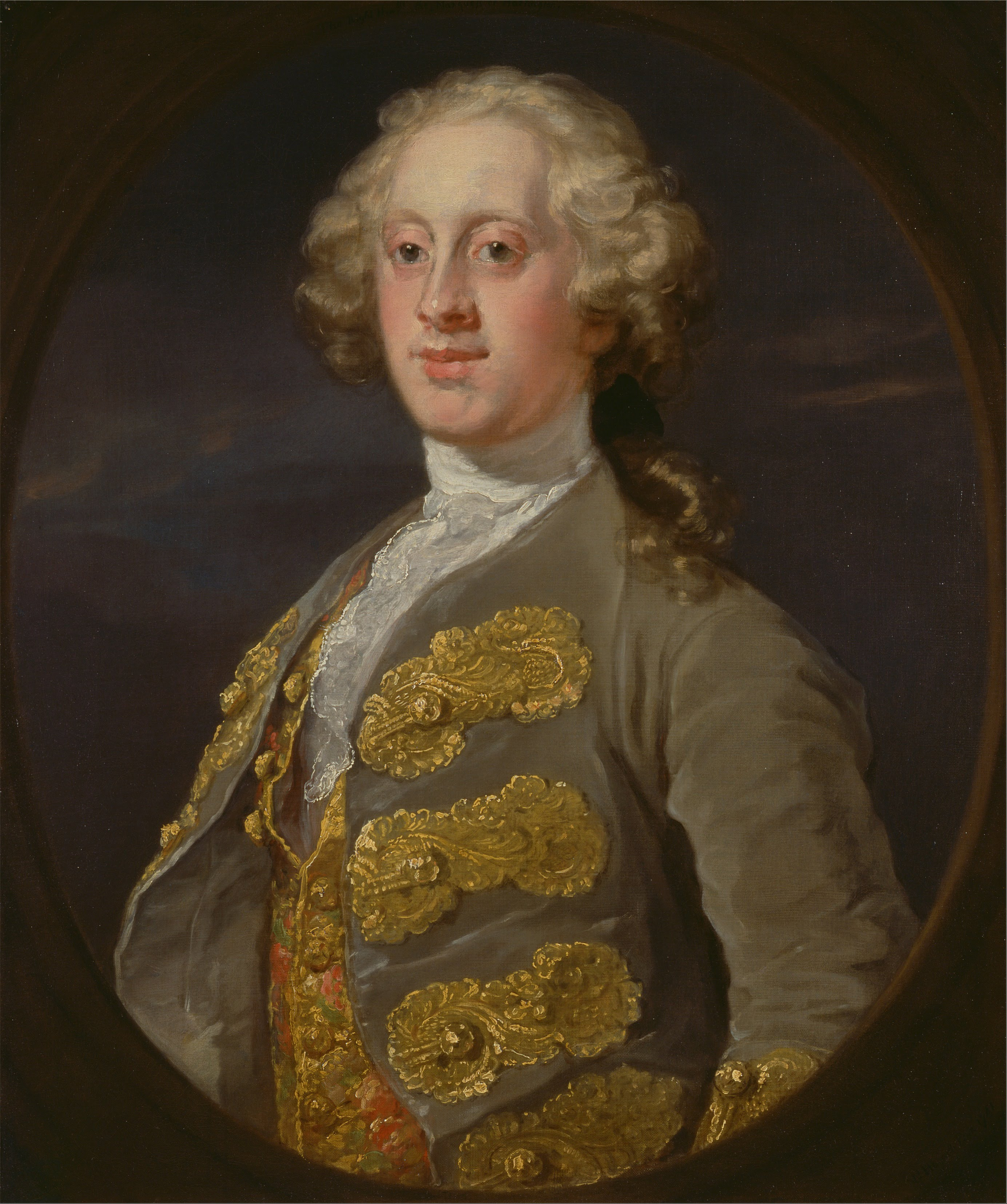
- William Cavendish, 4th Duke of Devonshire was prime minister and led the caretaker ministry
- Date formed: April 1757
- Date dissolved: June 1757

People and organisations
- Monarch: George II
- Prime Minister: William Cavendish, 4th Duke of Devonshire
- Member party: Whigs
- Status in legislature: Majority
- Opposition party: Tories

History
- Election: 1754 general election
- Legislature terms: 1754–1761
- Predecessor: Pitt–Devonshire ministry
- Successor: Pitt–Newcastle ministry

The Kingdom of Great Britain was governed by a caretaker government in April–June 1757, after George II's dismissal of William Pitt led to the collapse of the Pitt–Devonshire ministry amid the Seven Years' War. William Cavendish, 4th Duke of Devonshire, continued as the nominal head of government.

== History ==
In 1756, King George II was reluctantly compelled to accept a ministry dominated by William Pitt as Secretary of State. The nominal head of this ministry, as First Lord of the Treasury, was the Duke of Devonshire.

On 6 April 1757, following Pitt's opposition to the execution of Admiral John Byng, the King (who distrusted Pitt) dismissed him and his brother-in-law Lord Temple, who had been First Lord of the Admiralty. The result of these events was to demonstrate beyond doubt that the "Great Commoner" (as Pitt was familiarly known) was indispensable to the formation of a ministry strong enough to prosecute a major war.

Devonshire was left to lead a ministry that was manifestly far too weak to survive long—particularly in wartime. One of the major problems was that it included no figure capable of taking the lead in the House of Commons. The ministry also lacked the support of the most significant factions in the Commons.

Devonshire recognised that it was necessary to reconcile Pitt and his old political foe Thomas Pelham-Holles, 1st Duke of Newcastle, who led the strongest Whig faction in Parliament, but whose exclusion Pitt had insisted from the 1756–57 ministry.

The King (after discussions with Devonshire and Newcastle in May) authorised Philip Yorke, 1st Earl of Hardwicke, to be his emissary to negotiate for a new ministry. Hardwick pleaded with Pitt to work with Newcastle in heading "a complete, strong, and well-cemented" government, as opposed to "a mutilated, enfeebled, half-formed system".

The needs of the country and the lack of an obvious alternative led to the reappointment of Pitt as Secretary of State (with Newcastle as First Lord of the Treasury) on 27 June, forming the Pitt–Newcastle ministry. Devonshire resigned the office of First Lord to take up the less demanding responsibilities of Lord Chamberlain.

== Leading members ==
Cabinet members
Portfolio	Minister	Took office	Left office
First Lord of the Treasury; Leader of the House of Lords	William Cavendish, 4th Duke of Devonshire (head of ministry)	1756	June 1757
Lord Chancellor	In commission	1757	1757
Lord President of the Council	John Carteret, 2nd Earl Granville	1751	1763
Lord Privy Seal	Granville Leveson-Gower, 2nd Earl Gower	1755	1757
Leader of the House of Commons	Vacated by William Pitt	April 1757	June 1757
First Lord of the Admiralty	Daniel Finch, 8th Earl of Winchilsea	1757	1757
Secretary of State for the Northern Department	Robert Darcy, 4th Earl of Holderness	1754	1761
Secretary of State for the Southern Department	Robert Darcy, 4th Earl of Holderness (Note: Holderness took over from Pitt as Southern Secretary, serving as the sole Secretary of State.)	1757	1757
Chancellor of the Exchequer	William Murray, 1st Earl of Mansfield (Note: As no Chancellor had been appointed, Mansfield held the post pro tempore by virtue of being Lord Chief Justice.)	1757	1757

== See also ==
- 11th Parliament of Great Britain
- 1757 in Great Britain

== Works cited ==
- Campbell, John (1849), Mary Scarlett Campbell (ed.), The Lives of the Lord Chancellors and Keepers of the Great Seal of England, vol. 8, J. Murray (published 1869)
- Cook, Chris; Stevenson, John (1988), British Historical Facts: 1688–1760, Palgrave Macmillan UK, ISBN 978-1-3490-2369-1
- Haydn, Joseph (1851), The Book of Dignities, London: Longmans, Brown, Green, and Longmans

Preceded by Pitt–Devonshire ministry	Government of Great Britain; 6 April – 27 June 1757	Succeeded by Pitt–Newcastle ministry
