= Bute ministry =

British Government and Cabinet (1762-63)

- Cabinet of Great Britain
- 1762 – 1763
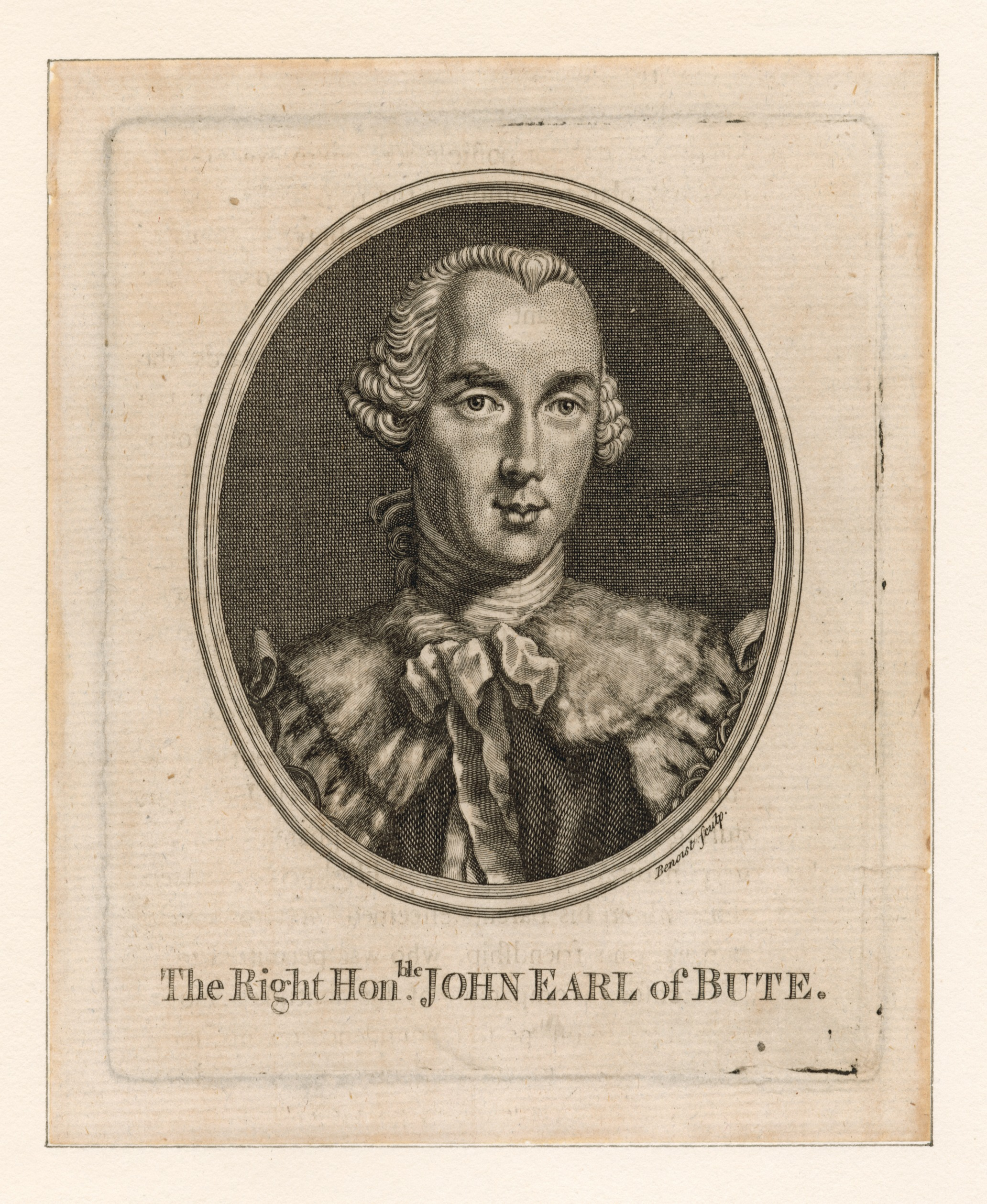
- John Stuart, 3rd Earl of Bute was prime minister and led the ministry.
- Date formed: 26 May 1762
- Date dissolved: 8 April 1763

People and organisations
- Monarch: George III
- Prime Minister: John Stuart, 3rd Earl of Bute
- Member party: Whigs (majority); Tories (Prime minister)
- Status in legislature: Majority (Whigs)

History
- Election: 1761 general election
- Legislature terms: 1761–1768
- Predecessor: Pitt–Newcastle ministry
- Successor: Grenville ministry

John Stuart, 3rd Earl of Bute, served as Prime Minister of Great Britain during 1762–1763. He was the first Tory prime minister since the Harley ministry during 1710–1714 though his ministry was largely made up of Whigs.

Bute resigned following fierce criticism of his signing of the Treaty of Paris with its perceived lenient terms for France and Spain despite Britain's successes in the Seven Years' War. The Bute ministry consisted largely of the same members as its successor, the Grenville ministry. George III favoured Bute, but could not keep him in government.

== Ministry ==
Portfolio	Minister	Took office	Left office
First Lord of the Treasury	John Stuart, 3rd Earl of Bute (head of ministry)	1762	1763
Chancellor of the Exchequer	Francis Dashwood, 11th Baron le Despencer	1762	1763
Secretary of State for the Southern Department; Leader of the House of Lords	Charles Wyndham, 2nd Earl of Egremont	1762	1763
Secretary of State for the Northern Department	George Grenville	1762	1762
Secretary of State for the Northern Department	George Montagu-Dunk, 2nd Earl of Halifax	1762	1763
Lord Chancellor	Robert Henley, 1st Earl of Northington	1762	1763
Lord President of the Council	John Carteret, 2nd Earl Granville	1762	1763
Lord President of the Council	John Russell, 4th Duke of Bedford	1763	1763
Lord Privy Seal	John Russell, 4th Duke of Bedford	1762	1763
First Lord of the Admiralty	George Montagu-Dunk, 2nd Earl of Halifax	1762	1762
First Lord of the Admiralty	George Grenville	1762	1763
Master-General of the Ordnance	John Ligonier, 1st Earl Ligonier	1762	1763
Paymaster of the Forces; Leader of the House of Commons	Henry Fox, 1st Baron Holland	1762	1763
Lord Chamberlain	William Cavendish, 4th Duke of Devonshire	1762	1762
Lord Chamberlain	George Spencer, 4th Duke of Marlborough	1762	1763

== See also ==
- Great Britain in the Seven Years' War
- Cider Bill of 1763

Preceded by Pitt–Newcastle ministry	Government of Great Britain; 1762–1763	Succeeded by Grenville ministry
