= Pitt–Newcastle ministry =

Government of Great Britain

- Cabinet of Great Britain
- 1757 – 1762
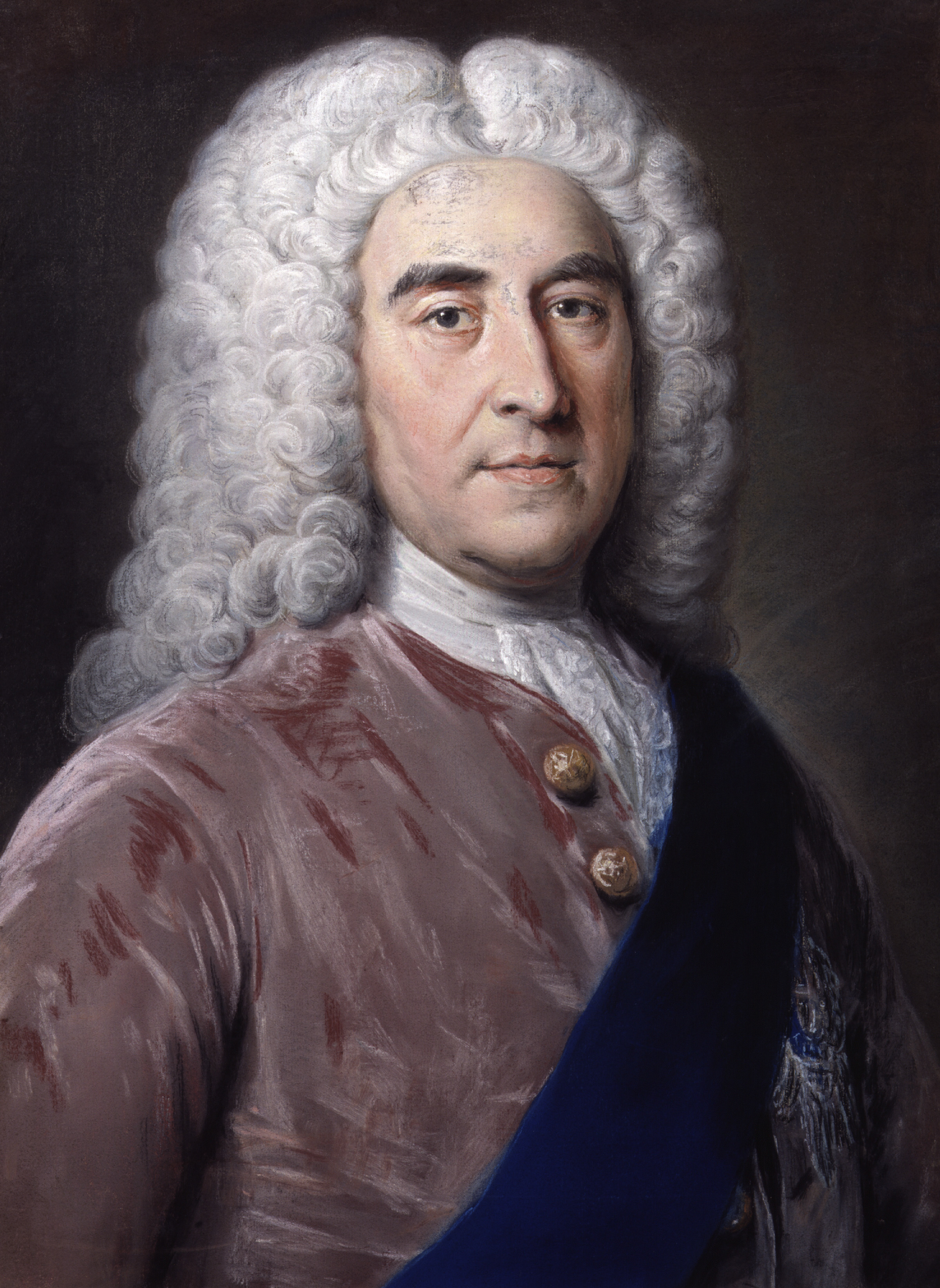
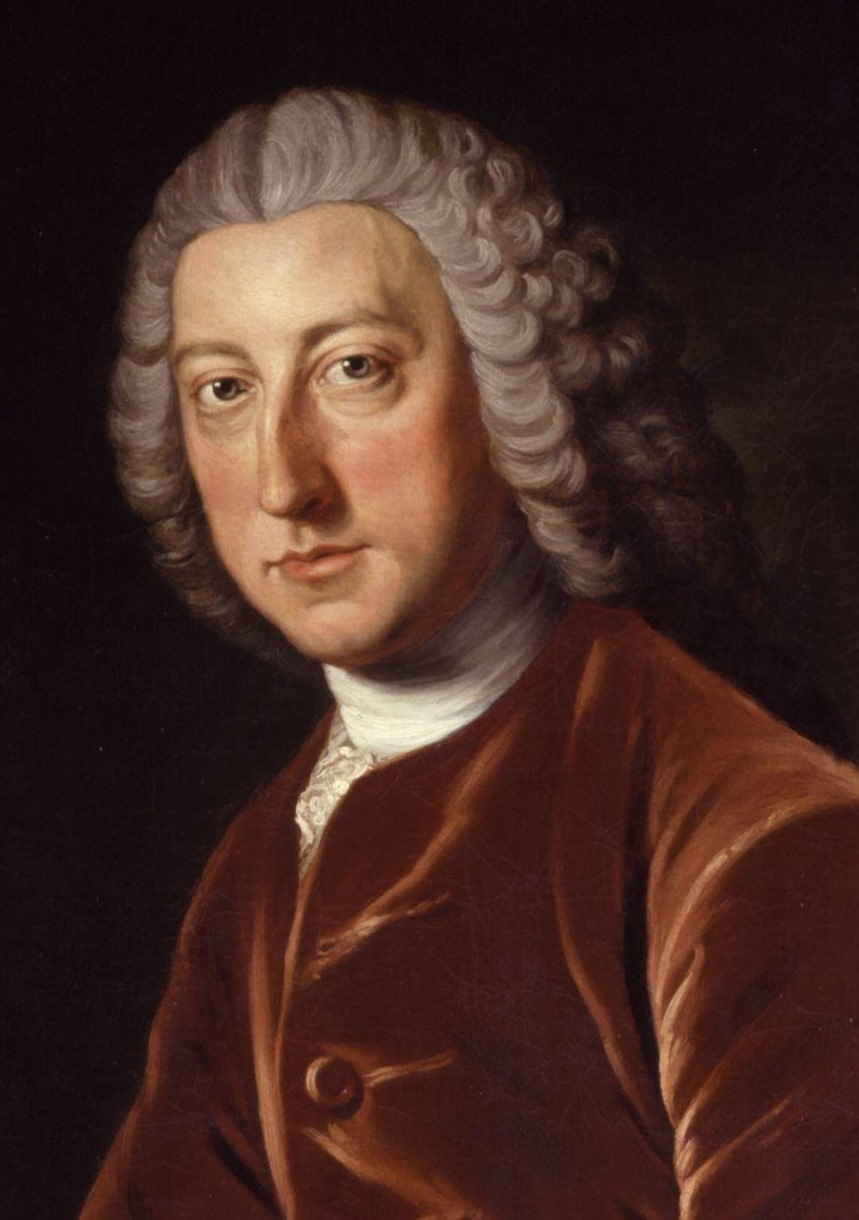
- Newcastle (left) and Pitt (right)
- Date formed: 29 June 1757
- Date dissolved: 26 May 1762

People and organisations
- Monarch: George II; George III
- Prime Minister: Thomas Pelham-Holles, 1st Duke of Newcastle
- Deputy Prime Minister: William Pitt, 1st Earl of Chatham (de facto)
- Member party: Whigs
- Status in legislature: Majority
- Opposition party: Tories

History
- Election: 1754 general election
- Legislature terms: 1754–1761
- Predecessor: 1757 caretaker ministry
- Successor: Bute ministry

Between 1757 and 1762, at the height of the Seven Years' War, the Pitt–Newcastle ministry governed the Kingdom of Great Britain. It was headed by Thomas Pelham-Holles, 1st Duke of Newcastle, serving in his second stint as prime minister. The most influential and famous minister, however, was William Pitt the Elder, Secretary of State.

== History ==
The ministry ended a period of political instability in which Great Britain had struggled in the war. Pitt was a strong war leader but lacked the support in Parliament necessary to provide effective leadership. Newcastle provided this, as he had a solid support base in the House of Commons. They divided duties between each other; Pitt directed the defence and foreign policies, while Newcastle controlled the nation's finances and patronage.

The ministry led Britain to many victories in the war, particularly in the so-called Annus Mirabilis of 1759, which put the country in a strong position by 1761; that year, however, Pitt resigned over a dispute concerning the entry of Spain into the war. Since King George II died in 1760, the ministry had been under pressure by the accession of George III, who disliked both Pitt and Newcastle and favoured John Stuart, 3rd Earl of Bute. Bute, a Tory, was made Northern Secretary in March 1761, and following Pitt's resignation, the ministry is otherwise referred to as the Bute–Newcastle coalition.

In 1762 Newcastle was forced to resign, with his followers (the "Pelhamites") dismissed by Bute in what became known as the "Massacre of the Pelhamite Innocents"; this is traditionally considered to have been the moment the ministry collapsed.

== Ministry ==
As compared to the 20th and 21st century, when ministers hold a cabinet-level position under the British prime minister, it is unclear which of the following ministers, beyond Pitt, functionally acted as members of Prime Minister Newcastle's cabinet.

Cabinet members
Portfolio	Minister	Took office	Left office
First Lord of the Treasury; Leader of the House of Lords	Thomas Pelham-Holles, 1st Duke of Newcastle (head of ministry)	1757	1762
Chancellor of the Exchequer; Second Lord of the Treasury	Henry Bilson-Legge	1757	1761
Chancellor of the Exchequer; Second Lord of the Treasury	William Barrington, 2nd Viscount Barrington	1761	1762
Lord Chancellor (after 1761); Lord Keeper of the Great Seal (before 1761)	Robert Henley, 1st Baron Henley	1757	1762
Lord President of the Council	John Carteret, 2nd Earl Granville	1757	1762
Lord Privy Seal	Richard Grenville-Temple, 2nd Earl Temple	1757	1761
Lord Privy Seal	In commission	1761	1761
Lord Privy Seal	John Russell, 4th Duke of Bedford	1761	1762
Leader of the House of Commons	William Pitt (head of ministry)	1757	1761
Leader of the House of Commons; Treasurer of the Navy	George Grenville	1761	1762
Secretary of State for the Southern Department	William Pitt (head of ministry)	1757	1761
Secretary of State for the Southern Department	Charles Wyndham, 2nd Earl of Egremont	1761	1762
Secretary of State for the Northern Department	Robert Darcy, 4th Earl of Holderness	1757	1761
Secretary of State for the Northern Department	John Stuart, 3rd Earl of Bute	1761	1762
Master-General of the Ordnance	Charles Spencer, 3rd Duke of Marlborough	1757	1758
Master-General of the Ordnance	Vacant	1758	1759
Master-General of the Ordnance	John Ligonier, 1st Viscount Ligonier	1759	1762
First Lord of the Admiralty	George Anson, 1st Baron Anson	1757	1762
Keeper of the Great Seal of Scotland	Archibald Campbell, 3rd Duke of Argyll	1757	1761
Keeper of the Great Seal of Scotland	Charles Douglas, 3rd Duke of Queensberry	1761	1762
Lord Chamberlain of the Household	The Duke of Devonshire	1757	1762
Lord Steward of the Household	John Manners, 3rd Duke of Rutland	1757	1761
Lord Steward of the Household	William Talbot, 1st Earl Talbot	1761	1762
Chancellor of the Duchy of Lancaster	Richard Edgcumbe, 1st Baron Edgcumbe	1757	1758
Chancellor of the Duchy of Lancaster	Thomas Hay, 9th Earl of Kinnoull	1758	1762
Lord Lieutenant of Ireland	John Russell, 4th Duke of Bedford	1757	1761
Lord Lieutenant of Ireland	George Montagu-Dunk, 2nd Earl of Halifax	1761	1762
Master of the Horse	Granville Leveson-Gower, 2nd Earl Gower	1757	1760
Master of the Horse	Francis Hastings, 10th Earl of Huntingdon	1760	1761
Master of the Horse	John Manners, 3rd Duke of Rutland	1761	1762
Paymaster of the Forces	Henry Fox, 1st Baron Holland	1757	1765

== See also ==
- 11th Parliament of Great Britain
- 1761 British general election
- Great Britain in the Seven Years' War
- Whigs (British political party)

== Notes ==
Preceded by Caretaker ministry	Government of Great Britain; 27 June 1757 – 26 May 1762	Succeeded by Bute ministry
