= Grenville ministry =

Government of Great Britain (1763–1765)

- Cabinet of Great Britain
- 1763 – 1765
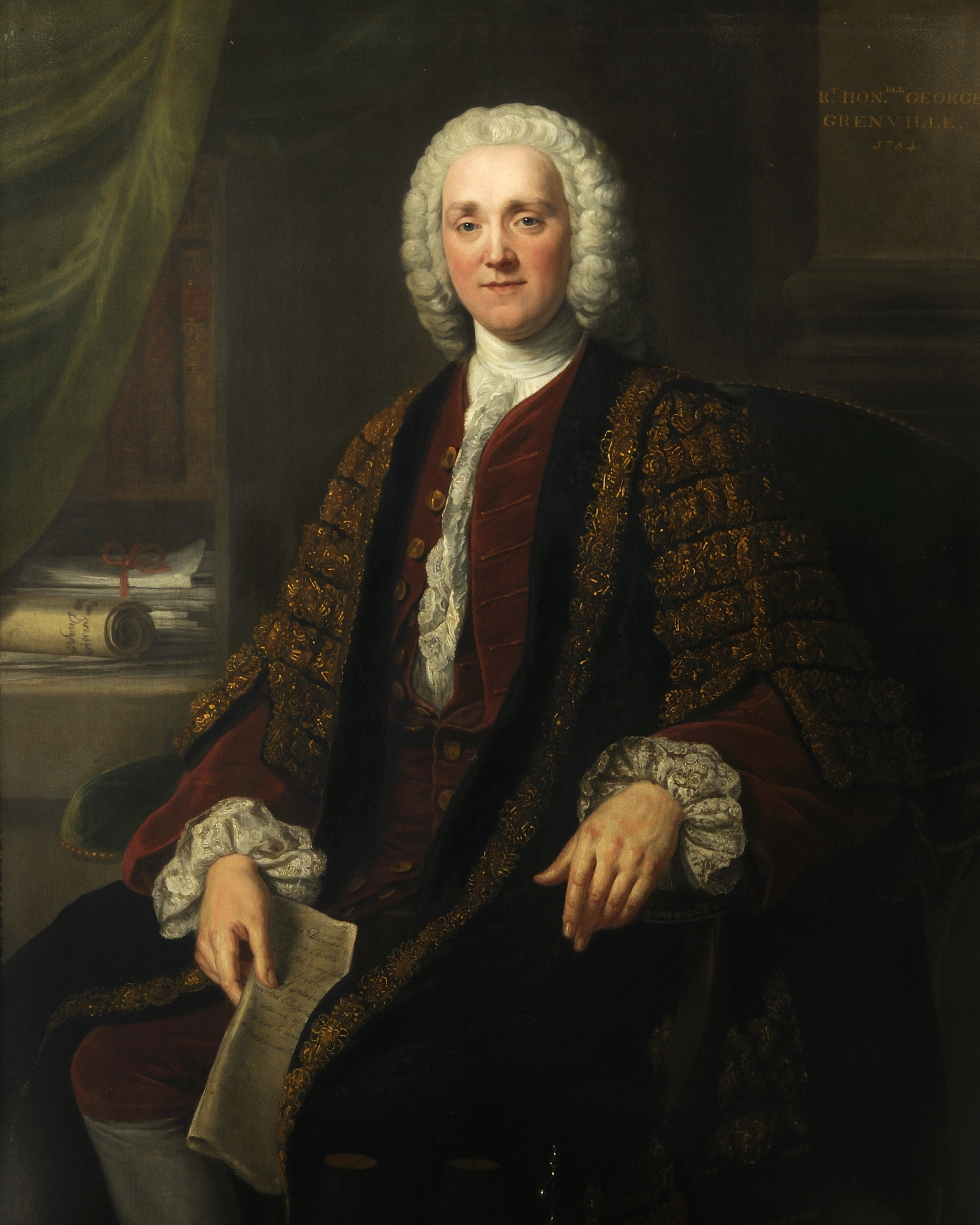
- George Grenville was prime minister and led the ministry.
- Date formed: 16 April 1763
- Date dissolved: 13 July 1765

People and organisations
- Monarch: George III
- Prime Minister: George Grenville
- Member party: Grenvillite Whigs
- Status in legislature: Majority

History
- Election: 1761 general election
- Legislature terms: 1761–1768
- Predecessor: Bute ministry
- Successor: First Rockingham ministry

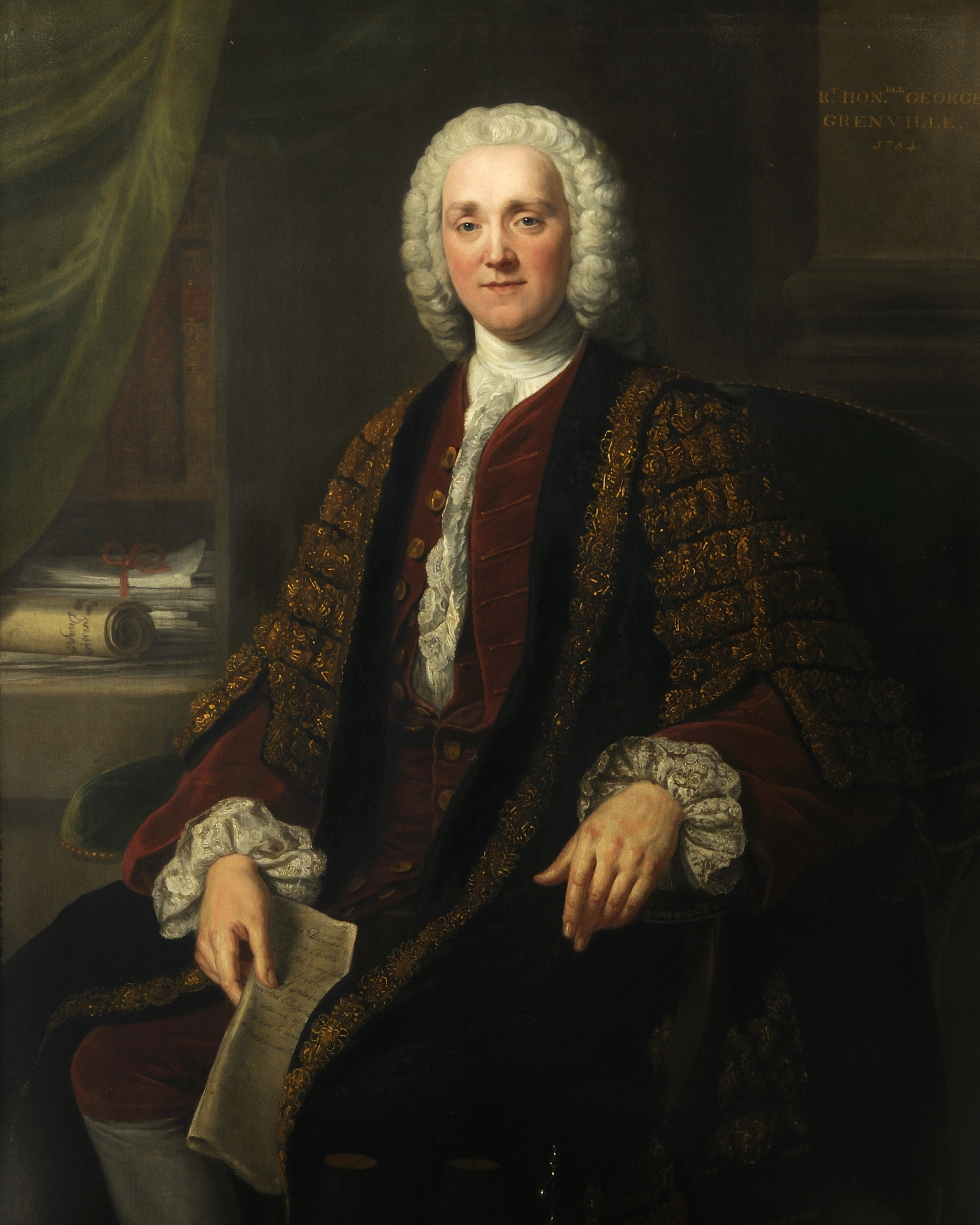
Prime Minister Grenville

The Grenville ministry was a British Government headed by George Grenville which served between 16 April 1763 and 13 July 1765. It was formed after the previous Prime Minister, the Earl of Bute, had resigned following fierce criticism of his signing of the Treaty of Paris with its perceived lenient terms for France and Spain despite Britain's successes in the Seven Years War. Grenville's government was made up largely of the same members as Bute's had. George III had a strong dislike of the new government because of the way they had replaced his favourite Bute.

During its two years, the ministry confronted growing discontent in Britain's American colonies which were to lead to the American War of Independence breaking out in 1775. The ministry also had to deal with the actions of John Wilkes.

The King's violent dislike of Grenville eventually forced him to dismiss him as first minister. He replaced Grenville with the Marquess of Rockingham, whom he hated almost equally.

== Ministry ==
Portfolio	Minister	Took office	Left office
First Lord of the Treasury; Chancellor of the Exchequer; Leader of the House of Commons	George Grenville (head of ministry)	1763	1765
Secretary of State for the Southern Department; Leader of the House of Lords	Charles Wyndham, 2nd Earl of Egremont	1763	1763
Secretary of State for the Southern Department; Leader of the House of Lords	George Montagu-Dunk, 2nd Earl of Halifax	1763	1765
Secretary of State for the Northern Department	George Montagu-Dunk, 2nd Earl of Halifax	1763	1763
Secretary of State for the Northern Department	John Montagu, 4th Earl of Sandwich	1763	1765
Lord Chancellor	Robert Henley, 1st Earl of Northington	1763	1765
Lord President of the Council	John Carteret, 2nd Earl Granville	1763	1763
Lord President of the Council	John Russell, 4th Duke of Bedford	1763	1765
Lord Privy Seal	George Spencer, 4th Duke of Marlborough	1763	1765
First Lord of the Admiralty	John Montagu, 4th Earl of Sandwich	1763	1763
First Lord of the Admiralty	John Perceval, 2nd Earl of Egmont	1763	1765
Master-General of the Ordnance	John Manners, Marquess of Granby	1763	1765
Paymaster of the Forces	Henry Fox, 1st Baron Holland	1763	1765
Lord Chamberlain	Granville Leveson-Gower, 2nd Earl Gower	1763	1765

Preceded by Bute ministry	Government of Great Britain; 1763–1765	Succeeded by First Rockingham ministry
