= Pitt–Devonshire ministry =

Government of Great Britain

- Cabinet of Great Britain
- 1756 – 1757
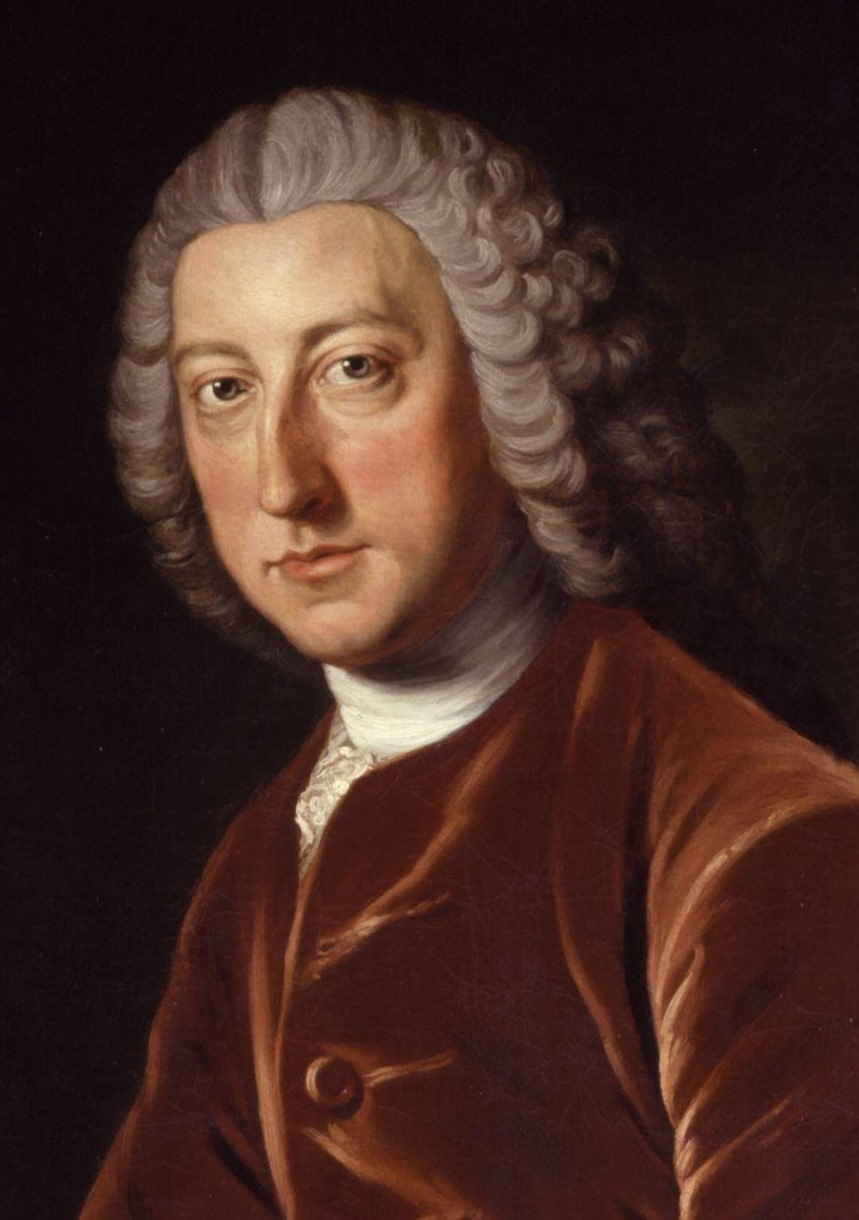
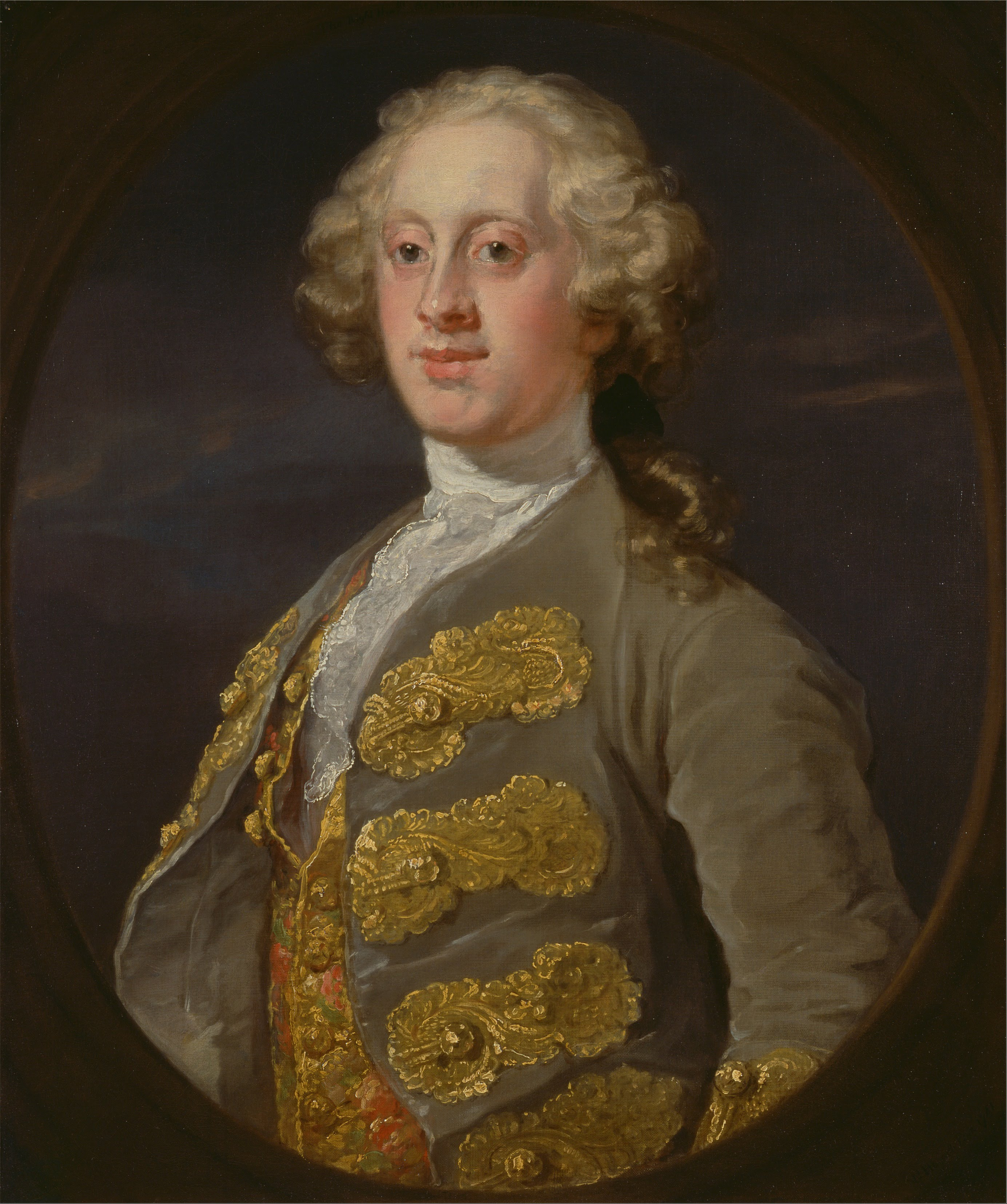
- Pitt (left) and Devonshire (right)
- Date formed: November 1756
- Date dissolved: April 1757

People and organisations
- Monarch: George II
- Prime Minister: William Cavendish, 4th Duke of Devonshire
- Deputy Prime Minister: William Pitt, 1st Earl of Chatham (de facto)
- Member party: Whigs
- Status in legislature: Majority
- Opposition party: Tories

History
- Election: 1754 general election
- Legislature terms: 1754–1761
- Predecessor: First Newcastle ministry
- Successor: 1757 caretaker ministry

The government of Great Britain was under the joint leadership of William Pitt the Elder (in the House of Commons) and William Cavendish, 4th Duke of Devonshire (in the House of Lords), between November 1756 and April 1757—when Pitt was dismissed by George II of Great Britain. The King disliked Pitt, but Pitt's influence in the Commons had led to his crucial appointment as Southern Secretary in a ministry nominally headed by Devonshire.

== Ministry ==
Principal ministers of the Crown were as follows:

Cabinet members
Portfolio	Minister	Took office	Left office
First Lord of the Treasury	William Cavendish, 4th Duke of Devonshire (head of ministry)	16 November 1756	1757
Chancellor of the Exchequer	Henry Bilson-Legge	16 November 1756	1757
Chancellor of the Exchequer	William Murray, 1st Baron Mansfield	13 April 1757	1757
Lord Privy Seal	Granville Leveson-Gower, 2nd Earl Gower	22 December 1755	1757
Chancellor of the Duchy of Lancaster	Richard Edgcumbe, 1st Baron Edgcumbe	22 December 1743	1757
Secretary of State for the Southern Department	William Pitt (head of ministry)	4 December 1756	6 April 1757
Secretary of State for the Northern Department	Robert Darcy, 4th Earl of Holderness	23 March 1754	9 June 1757
First Lord of Trade	George Montagu-Dunk, 2nd Earl of Halifax	1 November 1748	1757
First Lord of the Admiralty	Richard Grenville-Temple, 2nd Earl Temple	19 November 1756	6 April 1757
First Lord of the Admiralty	Daniel Finch, 8th Earl of Winchilsea	6 April 1757	1757
Treasurer of the Navy	George Grenville	23 November 1756	1757
Lord Lieutenant of Ireland	William Cavendish, 4th Duke of Devonshire	2 April 1755	3 January 1757
Lord Lieutenant of Ireland	John Russell, 4th Duke of Bedford	3 January 1757	1757

== See also ==
- 11th Parliament of Great Britain
- Whigs (British political party)

== Notes ==
Preceded by First Newcastle ministry	Government of Great Britain; 16 November 1756 – 6 April 1757	Succeeded by Caretaker ministry
