= List of MPs elected in the 1747 British general election =

1747–1754 Parliament of Great Britain
←	1741–1747 Parliament	1754–1761 Parliament	→

Overview
- Legislative body: Parliament of Great Britain
- Meeting place: Palace of Westminster
- Term: 10 November 1747 – 8 April 1754
- Election: 1747 British general election
- Government: First Newcastle ministry (from 16 March 1754); Broad Bottom ministry (until 6 March 1754)

House of Commons
- Members: 558
- Speaker: Arthur Onslow
- Leader: Thomas Robinson (from 23 March 1754); Henry Pelham (until 6 March 1754)
- Prime Minister: Duke of Newcastle (from 13 March 1754); Henry Pelham (until 6 March 1754)

House of Lords
- Lord Chancellor: Earl of Hardwicke
- Leader: Duke of Newcastle (from February 1748); Earl of Chesterfield (until February 1748)

Crown-in-Parliament George II

Sessions
- 1st: 10 November 1747 – 13 May 1748
- 2nd: 29 Nov. 1748 – 13 June 1749
- 3rd: 16 Nov. 1749 – 12 Apr. 1750
- 4th: 17 Jan. 1751 – 25 June 1751
- 5th: 14 Nov. 1751 – 26 Mar. 1752
- 6th: 11 Jan. 1753 – 7 June 1753
- 7th: 15 Nov. 1753 – 6 Apr. 1754

This is a list of the 558 MPs or members of Parliament elected to the 558 seats of the Parliament of Great Britain in 1747, the 10th Parliament of Great Britain.

== A ==
Aberdeen Burghs (seat 1/1)	David Scott	Administration
Aberdeenshire (seat 1/1)	Andrew Mitchell	Whig
Abingdon (seat 1/1)	John Morton	
