= List of MPs elected in the 1754 British general election =

1754–1761 Parliament of Great Britain
←	1747–1754 Parliament	1761–1768 Parliament	→

Overview
- Legislative body: Parliament of Great Britain
- Meeting place: Palace of Westminster
- Term: 31 May 1754 – 20 March 1761
- Election: 1754 British general election
- Government: Pitt–Newcastle ministry (from 1757); 1757 caretaker ministry (April–June 1757); Pitt–Devonshire ministry (November 1756–April 1757); First Newcastle ministry (until November 1756)

House of Commons
- Members: 558
- Speaker: Arthur Onslow
- Leader: William Pitt (December 1756–April 1757; from June 1757); Henry Fox (November 1755–November 1756); Thomas Robinson (until October 1755)
- Prime Minister: Duke of Newcastle (until 11 November 1756; from 29 June 1757); Duke of Devonshire (16 November 1756–29 June 1757)

House of Lords
- Lord Speaker: Earl of Northington (from 30 June 1757); In commission (19 November 1756–30 June 1757); Earl of Hardwicke (until 19 November 1756)
- Leader: Duke of Newcastle (until 11 November 1756; from 29 June 1757); Duke of Devonshire (16 November 1756–29 June 1757)

Crown-in-Parliament George II George III

Sessions
- 1st: 31 May 1754 – 5 June 1754
- 2nd: 14 November 1754 – 25 April 1755
- 3rd: 13 November 1755 – 27 May 1756
- 4th: 2 Dec. 1756 – 4 July 1757
- 5th: 1 December 1757 – 20 June 1758
- 6th: 23 Nov. 1758 – 2 June 1759
- 7th: 13 November 1759 – 22 May 1760
- 8th: 26 October 1760 – 29 October 1760
- 9th: 18 November 1760 – 19 March 1761

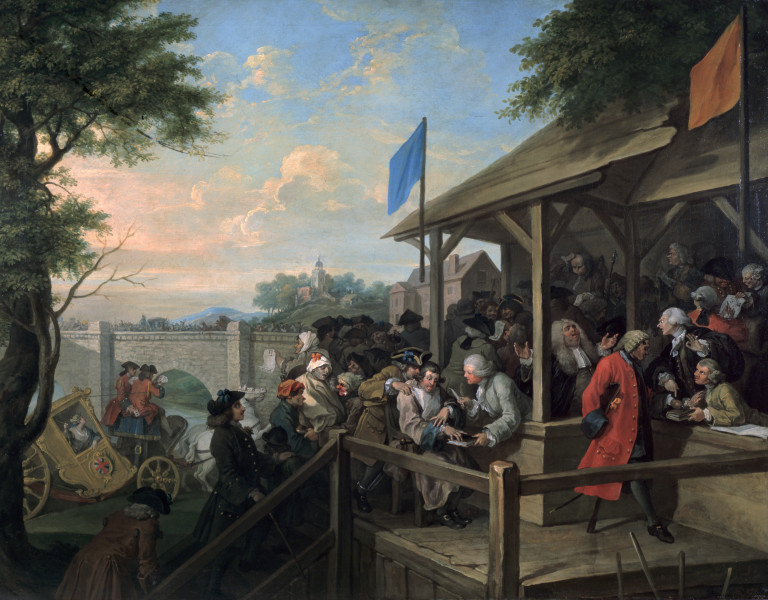
William Hogarth's painting series Humours of an Election portrayed the perceived corrupt and petty squabbles of the Tories and Whigs in 1754 Oxfordshire in an unflattering light.

This is a list of the 558 MPs or members of Parliament elected to the 314 constituencies of the Parliament of Great Britain in 1754, the 11th Parliament of Great Britain.

The candidates returned in contested elections are listed in the descending order of the number of votes received.

The Tory versus Whig party division, which had originated in the Exclusion Bill debates in the seventeenth century, was almost extinct by 1754. Whilst some members were still identifiable as being of a Tory or Whig persuasion, few contested elections turned on party cries. The hotly contested Oxfordshire and Reading elections were amongst the few where party in the old sense mattered at all and 1754 was the last such election in those areas. Identification by party in the list below is therefore of limited significance, particularly as to the future loyalties of the politician concerned.

For what it is worth the government electoral manager, Viscount Dupplin, reported to the Whig Prime Minister (Thomas Pelham-Holles, 1st Duke of Newcastle) that the outcome of the election was Administration 368, Tory 106, Opposition Whig 42 and doubtful 26.

Peers of Ireland are differentiated from the holders of courtesy titles by including the succession number to the peerage, i.e. The 1st Earl of Upper Ossory is an Irish peer and Viscount Dupplin is the holder of a courtesy title.

Table of contents:

A B C D E F G H I J K L M N O P Q R S T U V W X Y Z By-elections Changes

== A ==
Aberdeen Burghs (seat 1/1)	David Scott	Administration
Aberdeenshire (seat 1/1)	Lord Adam Gordon	Administration
Abingdon (seat 1/1)	John Morton	Tory
Aldborough (seat 1/2)	William Pitt	Administration
Aldborough (seat 2/2)	Andrew Wilkinson	Administration
Aldeburgh (seat 1/2)	William Windham	Administration
Aldeburgh (seat 2/2)	Zachary Philip Fonnereau	Administration
Amersham (seat 1/2)	William Drake, Sr	Tory
Amersham (seat 2/2)	Isaac Whittington	Tory
Andover (seat 1/2)	John Griffin Whitwell	Administration
Andover (seat 2/2)	Francis Blake Delaval	Opposition Whig
Anglesey (seat 1/1)	Sir Nicholas Bayly, Bt	Country (Admin.)
Anstruther Easter Burghs (seat 1/1)	Sir Henry Erskine, Bt	Administration
Appleby (seat 1/2)	Philip Honywood	Administration
Appleby (seat 2/2)	William Lee	Administration
Argyllshire (seat 1/1)	Dugald Campbell	Administration
Arundel (seat 1/2)	George Colebrooke	Opposition Whig
Arundel (seat 2/2)	Thomas Griffin	Administration
Ashburton (seat 1/2)	John Harris of Hayne	Administration
Ashburton (seat 2/2)	The 3rd Viscount Midleton	Administration
Aylesbury (seat 1/2)	Thomas Potter	doubtful
Aylesbury (seat 2/2)	John Willes	Administration
Ayr Burghs (seat 1/1)	James Stuart-Mackenzie	Administration
Ayrshire (seat 1/1)	James Mure-Campbell	Administration
== B ==
Banbury (seat 1/1)	Lord North	Administration
Banffshire (seat 1/1)	Hon. James Duff	Whig (doubtful)
Barnstaple (seat 1/2)	John Harris of Pickwell	Tory
Barnstaple (seat 2/2)	George Amyand	Administration
Bath (seat 1/2)	Sir John Ligonier	Administration
Bath (seat 2/2)	Robert Henley	Administration
Beaumaris (seat 1/1)	Richard Thelwall Price	Tory
Bedford (seat 1/2)	Francis Herne	Tory
Bedford (seat 2/2)	Robert Ongley	Tory
Bedfordshire (seat 1/2)	The 1st Earl of Upper Ossory	Opposition Whig
Bedfordshire (seat 2/2)	Thomas Alston	Opposition Whig
Bedwyn	see Great Bedwyn	...
Bere Alston (seat 1/2)	Sir Francis Henry Drake	Administration
Bere Alston (seat 2/2)	John Bristow	Administration
Berkshire (seat 1/2)	Peniston Powney	Tory
Berkshire (seat 2/2)	Henry Pye	Tory
Berwickshire (seat 1/1)	Alexander Hume-Campbell	Administration
Berwick-upon-Tweed (seat 1/2)	Thomas Watson	Administration
Berwick-upon-Tweed (seat 2/2)	John Delaval	Opposition Whig
Beverley (seat 1/2)	Sir William Codrington, Bt	Opposition Whig
Beverley (seat 2/2)	John Jolliffe Tufnell	Administration
Bewdley (seat 1/1)	William Henry Lyttelton	Administration
Bishops Castle (seat 1/2)	John Dashwood-King	Tory
Bishops Castle (seat 2/2)	Barnaby Backwell	Tory
Bletchingley (seat 1/2)	Sir Kenrick Clayton, Bt	Administration
Bletchingley (seat 2/2)	William Clayton	Administration
Bodmin (seat 1/2)	Sir William Irby, Bt	Administration
Bodmin (seat 2/2)	George Hunt	Administration
Boroughbridge (seat 1/2)	William Murray	Administration
Boroughbridge (seat 2/2)	Lewis Watson	Administration
Bossiney (seat 1/2)	Hon. Edwin Sandys	Administration
Bossiney (seat 2/2)	Edward Wortley Montagu	Opposition Whig
Boston (seat 1/2)	Lord Robert Bertie	Administration
Boston (seat 2/2)	Charles Amcotts	Tory
Brackley (seat 1/2)	Marshe Dickinson	Tory
Brackley (seat 2/2)	Thomas Humberston	Administration
Bramber (seat 1/2)	Viscount Malpas	Administration
Bramber (seat 2/2)	Nathaniel Newnham	Administration
Brecon (seat 1/1)	Thomas Morgan, Jr	Administration
Breconshire (seat 1/1)	Thomas Morgan	Administration
Bridgnorth (seat 1/2)	John Grey	Administration
Bridgnorth (seat 2/2)	William Whitmore	Administration
Bridgwater (seat 1/2)	The 2nd Earl of Egmont	Opposition Whig
Bridgwater (seat 2/2)	Robert Balch	Administration
Bridport (seat 1/2)	John Frederick Pinney	Tory
Bridport (seat 2/2)	Thomas Coventry	Administration
Bristol (seat 1/2)	Robert Nugent	Administration
Bristol (seat 2/2)	Richard Beckford	Tory
Buckingham (seat 1/2)	George Grenville	Administration
Buckingham (seat 2/2)	James Grenville	Administration
Buckinghamshire (seat 1/2)	Sir William Stanhope	doubtful
Buckinghamshire (seat 2/2)	Richard Lowndes	Tory
Bury St Edmunds (seat 1/2)	Viscount Petersham	Administration
Bury St Edmunds (seat 2/2)	election void	see note c
Buteshire (seat 0/0)	unrepresented in this Parliament	...
== C ==
Caernarvon Boroughs (seat 1/1)	Sir William Wynn	Administration
Caernarvonshire (seat 1/1)	Sir John Wynn, Bt	Administration
Caithness (seat 1/1)	John Scott	Administration
Callington (seat 1/2)	Sewallis Shirley	Tory
Callington (seat 2/2)	John Sharpe	Administration
Calne (seat 1/2)	William Northey	Tory
Calne (seat 2/2)	Thomas Duckett	Administration
Cambridge (seat 1/2)	Viscount Dupplin	Administration
Cambridge (seat 2/2)	Thomas Bromley	Administration
Cambridgeshire (seat 1/2)	Marquess of Granby	
Cambridgeshire (seat 2/2)	Viscount Royston	Administration
Cambridge University (seat 1/2)	Edward Finch	
Cambridge University (seat 2/2)	Thomas Townshend	
Camelford (seat 1/2)	Samuel Martin	
Camelford (seat 2/2)	John Lade	
Canterbury (seat 1/2)	Sir James Creed	
Canterbury (seat 2/2)	Matthew Robinson Morris	
Cardiff Boroughs (seat 1/1)	Herbert Mackworth, Sr	
Cardigan Boroughs (seat 1/1)	John Symmons	
Cardiganshire (seat 1/1)	John Lloyd	Administration
Carlisle (seat 1/2)	Sir Charles Howard	
Carlisle (seat 2/2)	John Stanwix	
Carmarthen (seat 1/1)	Griffith Philipps	
Carmarthenshire (seat 1/1)	George Rice	
Castle Rising (seat 1/2)	Hon. Thomas Howard	
Castle Rising (seat 2/2)	Horatio Walpole (1717–1797)	
Cheshire (seat 1/2)	Charles Cholmondeley	
Cheshire (seat 2/2)	Samuel Egerton	
Chester (seat 1/2)	Sir Robert Grosvenor, Bt	
Chester (seat 2/2)	Richard Grosvenor	
Chichester (seat 1/2)	John Page	
Chichester (seat 2/2)	Viscount Bury	
Chippenham (seat 1/2)	Edward Bayntun-Rolt	
Chippenham (seat 2/2)	Samuel Fludyer	
Chipping Wycombe (seat 1/2)	The 1st Earl of Shelburne	
Chipping Wycombe (seat 2/2)	John Waller	
Christchurch (seat 1/2)	Sir Thomas Robinson	
Christchurch (seat 2/2)	John Mordaunt	
Cirencester (seat 1/2)	Benjamin Bathurst	Tory
Cirencester (seat 2/2)	John Dawnay	Tory
City of Durham	see Durham (City of)	...
City of London	see London (City of)	...
Clackmannanshire (seat 0/0)	unrepresented in this Parliament	...
Clitheroe (seat 1/2)	Thomas Lister	
Clitheroe (seat 2/2)	Assheton Curzon	
Clyde Burghs	see Glasgow Burghs	...
Cockermouth (seat 1/2)	Sir John Mordaunt	
Cockermouth (seat 2/2)	Percy Wyndham-O'Brien	
Colchester (seat 1/2)	John Olmius	Administration
Colchester (seat 2/2)	Charles Gray	Tory
Corfe Castle (seat 1/2)	Henry Bankes	doubtful
Corfe Castle (seat 2/2)	John Bond	
Cornwall (seat 1/2)	Sir John Molesworth, Bt	
Cornwall (seat 2/2)	James Buller	
County Durham	see Durham (County)	...
Coventry (seat 1/2)	Samuel Greatheed	
Coventry (seat 2/2)	William Grove	
Cricklade (seat 1/2)	Thomas Gore	
Cricklade (seat 2/2)	William Rawlinson Earle	
Cromartyshire (seat 1/1)	Sir John Gordon, Bt	
Cumberland (seat 1/2)	Sir James Lowther, Bt	
Cumberland (seat 2/2)	Sir John Pennington, Bt	
== D ==
Dartmouth (seat 1/2)	Walter Carey	
Dartmouth (seat 2/2)	John Jeffreys	
Denbigh Boroughs (seat 1/1)	Richard Myddelton	
Denbighshire (seat 1/1)	Sir Lynch Salusbury Cotton	
Derby (seat 1/2)	Lord Frederick Cavendish	Administration
Derby (seat 2/2)	George Venables-Vernon	
Derbyshire (seat 1/2)	Lord George Cavendish	
Derbyshire (seat 2/2)	Nathaniel Curzon	
Devizes (seat 1/2)	John Garth	
Devizes (seat 2/2)	William Willy	
Devon (seat 1/2)	Sir William Courtenay	
Devon (seat 2/2)	Sir Richard Warwick Bampfylde	
Dorchester (seat 1/2)	The 1st Baron Milton	
Dorchester (seat 2/2)	John Pitt	
Dorset (seat 1/2)	George Pitt	
Dorset (seat 2/2)	Humphry Sturt	Tory
Dover (seat 1/2)	William Cayley	
Dover (seat 2/2)	Lord George Sackville	
Downton (seat 1/2)	James Cope	
Downton (seat 2/2)	James Hayes	
Droitwich (seat 1/2)	Robert Harley	
Droitwich (seat 2/2)	Thomas Foley	
Dumfries Burghs (seat 1/1)	Archibald Douglas	
Dumfriesshire (seat 1/1)	Lord Charles Douglas	
Dunbartonshire (seat 1/1)	John Campbell (1693–1770)	
Dunwich (seat 1/2)	Sir Jacob Garrard Downing, Bt	
Dunwich (seat 2/2)	Soame Jenyns	
Durham (City of) (seat 1/2)	Henry Lambton	
Durham (City of) (seat 2/2)	John Tempest	
Durham (County) (seat 1/2)	Viscount Barnard	
Durham (County) (seat 2/2)	George Bowes	
Dysart Burghs (seat 1/1)	James Oswald	
== E ==
East Grinstead (seat 1/2)	Joseph Yorke	
East Grinstead (seat 2/2)	Sir Whistler Webster	
East Looe (seat 1/2)	John Buller	
East Looe (seat 2/2)	Francis Gashry	
East Retford (seat 1/2)	John White	Administration
East Retford (seat 2/2)	John Shelley	
Edinburgh (seat 1/1)	William Alexander	Administration
Edinburghshire (seat 1/1)	Robert Dundas	
Elgin Burghs (seat 1/1)	William Grant	
Elginshire (seat 1/1)	Sir Ludovick Grant, Bt	
Essex (seat 1/2)	Sir John Abdy, Bt	Tory
Essex (seat 2/2)	William Harvey	
Evesham (seat 1/2)	Sir John Rushout, 4th Baronet	
Evesham (seat 2/2)	John Porter	
Exeter (seat 1/2)	John Tuckfield	
Exeter (seat 2/2)	John Rolle Walter	
Eye (seat 1/2)	Nicholas Hardinge	
Eye (seat 2/2)	Courthorpe Clayton	
== F ==
Fife (seat 1/1)	James St. Clair	
Flint Boroughs (seat 1/1)	Sir John Glynne, 6th Baronet	
Flintshire (seat 1/1)	Sir Thomas Mostyn	
Forfarshire (seat 1/1)	The 1st Earl Panmure	
Fowey (seat 1/2)	Jonathan Rashleigh	
Fowey (seat 2/2)	George Edgcumbe	
== G ==
Gatton (seat 1/2)	James Colebrooke	
Gatton (seat 2/2)	Thomas Brand	
Glamorganshire (seat 1/1)	Charles Edwin	
Glasgow Burghs (seat 1/1)	John Campbell (1723–1806)	
Gloucester (seat 1/2)	Charles Barrow	
Gloucester (seat 2/2)	George Augustus Selwyn	
Gloucestershire (seat 1/2)	Thomas Chester	Tory
Gloucestershire (seat 2/2)	Norborne Berkeley	Tory
Grampound (seat 1/2)	Merrick Burrell	
Grampound (seat 2/2)	Simon Fanshawe	
Grantham (seat 1/2)	Lord George Manners	
Grantham (seat 2/2)	Sir John Cust, Bt	
Great Bedwyn (seat 1/2)	Sir Robert Hildyard	
Great Bedwyn (seat 2/2)	William Sloper	
Great Grimsby (seat 1/2)	William Lock	
Great Grimsby (seat 2/2)	John Gore	
Great Marlow (seat 1/2)	Charles Churchill	
Great Marlow (seat 2/2)	Daniel Moore	
Great Yarmouth (seat 1/2)	Hon. Charles Townshend	
Great Yarmouth (seat 2/2)	Sir Edward Walpole	
Guildford (seat 1/2)	Richard Onslow	
Guildford (seat 2/2)	Sir John Elwill, 4th Baronet	
== H ==
Haddington Burghs (seat 1/1)	Andrew Fletcher	
Haddingtonshire (seat 1/1)	Sir Hew Dalrymple	
Hampshire (seat 1/2)	Lord Harry Powlett (1691–1759)	
Hampshire (seat 2/2)	Alexander Thistlethwayte	
Harwich (seat 1/2)	John Phillipson	
Harwich (seat 2/2)	Edward Coke	
Haslemere (seat 1/2)	James More Molyneux	
Haslemere (seat 2/2)	Philip Carteret Webb	
Hastings (seat 1/2)	James Pelham	
Hastings (seat 2/2)	Andrew Stone	
Haverfordwest (seat 1/1)	William Edwardes	
Hedon (seat 1/2)	Charles Saunders	
Hedon (seat 2/2)	Peter Denis	
Helston (seat 1/2)	Francis Godolphin	
Helston (seat 2/2)	John Evelyn	
Hereford (seat 1/2)	Charles Fitzroy Scudamore	
Hereford (seat 2/2)	John Symons	
Herefordshire (seat 1/2)	Velters Cornewall	
Herefordshire (seat 2/2)	Baron Harley	
Hertford (seat 1/2)	Nathaniel Brassey	
Hertford (seat 2/2)	George Harrison	
Hertfordshire (seat 1/2)	Paggen Hale	Administration
Hertfordshire (seat 2/2)	Charles Gore	Administration
Heytesbury (seat 1/2)	Pierce A'Court-Ashe	Administration
Heytesbury (seat 2/2)	William A'Court	Administration
Higham Ferrers (seat 1/1)	John Yorke	
Hindon (seat 1/2)	Bisse Richards	
Hindon (seat 2/2)	James Dawkins	
Honiton (seat 1/2)	Henry Reginald Courtenay	
Honiton (seat 2/2)	George Yonge	
Horsham (seat 1/2)	Charles Ingram	
Horsham (seat 2/2)	Sir Lionel Pilkington	
Huntingdon (seat 1/2)	Edward Montagu	
Huntingdon (seat 2/2)	Robert Jones	
Huntingdonshire (seat 1/2)	The 1st Baron Carysfort	
Huntingdonshire (seat 2/2)	Coulson Fellowes	
Hythe (seat 1/2)	Sir Thomas Hales	
Hythe (seat 2/2)	William Glanville	
== I ==
Ilchester (seat 1/2)	Thomas Lockyer	
Ilchester (seat 2/2)	John Talbot	
Inverness Burghs (seat 1/1)	John Campbell of Cawdor (1695–1777)	
Inverness-shire (seat 1/1)	Pryse Campbell	
Ipswich (seat 1/2)	Edward Vernon	
Ipswich (seat 2/2)	Samuel Kent	
== K ==
Kent (seat 1/2)	Lewis Watson	Administration
Kent (seat 2/2)	Robert Fairfax	Administration
Kincardineshire (seat 1/1)	Sir James Carnegie, Bt	
King's Lynn (seat 1/2)	Sir John Turner	
King's Lynn (seat 2/2)	Horatio Walpole (1723–1809)	
Kingston upon Hull (seat 1/2)	Richard Crowle	
Kingston upon Hull (seat 2/2)	Lord Robert Manners	
Kinross-shire (seat 1/1)	Robert Colvile	
Kirkcudbright Stewartry (seat 1/1)	John Mackye	
Knaresborough (seat 1/2)	Hon. Richard Arundell	Administration
Knaresborough (seat 2/2)	Sir Henry Slingsby	
== L ==
Lanarkshire (seat 1/1)	James Vere	
Lancashire (seat 1/2)	Lord Strange	
Lancashire (seat 2/2)	Peter Bold	
Lancaster (seat 1/2)	Francis Reynolds	
Lancaster (seat 2/2)	Edward Marton	
Launceston (seat 1/2)	Sir George Lee	
Launceston (seat 2/2)	Humphry Morice	
Leicester (seat 1/2)	James Wigley	
Leicester (seat 2/2)	George Wrighte	
Leicestershire (seat 1/2)	Sir Thomas Palmer	
Leicestershire (seat 2/2)	Edward Smith	
Leominster (seat 1/2)	Sir Charles Hanbury Williams	
Leominster (seat 2/2)	Richard Gorges	
Lewes (seat 1/2)	Sir Francis Poole	
Lewes (seat 2/2)	Thomas Sergison	
Lichfield (seat 1/2)	Viscount Trentham	
Lichfield (seat 2/2)	Thomas Anson	Administration
Lincoln (seat 1/2)	George Monson	
Lincoln (seat 2/2)	John Chaplin	
Lincolnshire (seat 1/2)	Robert Vyner	Tory
Lincolnshire (seat 2/2)	Thomas Whichcot	
Linlithgow Burghs (seat 1/1)	John Murray	
Linlithgowshire (seat 1/1)	Charles Hope-Weir	
Liskeard (seat 1/2)	Edmund Nugent	
Liskeard (seat 2/2)	Philip Stanhope	
Liverpool (seat 1/2)	John Hardman	
Liverpool (seat 2/2)	Thomas Salusbury	
London (City of) (seat 1/4)	Sir John Barnard	
London (City of) (seat 2/4)	Slingsby Bethell	
London (City of) (seat 3/4)	Sir Robert Ladbroke	
London (City of) (seat 4/4)	William Beckford	
Lostwithiel (seat 1/2)	James Edward Colleton	
Lostwithiel (seat 2/2)	Thomas Clarke	
Ludgershall (seat 1/2)	Sir John Bland	
Ludgershall (seat 2/2)	Thomas Hayward	
Ludlow (seat 1/2)	Richard Herbert	
Ludlow (seat 2/2)	Henry Bridgeman	
Lyme Regis (seat 1/2)	Francis Fane	
Lyme Regis (seat 2/2)	Thomas Fane	
Lymington (seat 1/2)	Sir Charles Powlett	
Lymington (seat 2/2)	Harry Burrard	
== M ==
Maidstone (seat 1/2)	Gabriel Hanger	
Maidstone (seat 2/2)	Lord Guernsey	
Maldon (seat 1/2)	John Bullock	
Maldon (seat 2/2)	Robert Colebrooke	
Malmesbury (seat 1/2)	Lord George Bentinck	
Malmesbury (seat 2/2)	Brice Fisher	
Malton (seat 1/2)	Henry Finch	
Malton (seat 2/2)	John Mostyn	
Marlborough (seat 1/2)	Sir John Hynde Cotton	
Marlborough (seat 2/2)	John Ward	
Marlow	see Great Marlow	...
Melcombe Regis	see Weymouth and Melcombe Regis	...
Merionethshire (seat 1/1)	William Vaughan	
Middlesex (seat 1/2)	Sir William Beauchamp-Proctor, Bt	Administration
Middlesex (seat 2/2)	George Cooke	Tory
Midhurst (seat 1/2)	Sir John Peachey	
Midhurst (seat 2/2)	John Sargent	
Milborne Port (seat 1/2)	Edward Walter	
Milborne Port (seat 2/2)	Thomas Medlycott	
Minehead (seat 1/2)	Charles Whitworth	
Minehead (seat 2/2)	Daniel Boone	
Mitchell (seat 1/2)	Robert Clive	
Mitchell (seat 2/2)	John Stephenson	
Monmouth Boroughs (seat 1/1)	Benjamin Bathurst	
Monmouthshire (seat 1/2)	William Morgan	Administration
Monmouthshire (seat 2/2)	Capel Hanbury	Administration
Montgomery (seat 1/1)	William Bodvell	
Montgomeryshire (seat 1/1)	Edward Kynaston	
Morpeth (seat 1/2)	Thomas Duncombe	
Morpeth (seat 2/2)	Robert Ord	
Much Wenlock (seat 1/2)	see Wenlock	...
== N ==
Nairnshire (seat 0/0)	unrepresented in this Parliament	...
Newark (seat 1/2)	John Manners	
Newark (seat 2/2)	Job Staunton Charlton	
Newcastle-under-Lyme (seat 1/2)	John Waldegrave	
Newcastle-under-Lyme (seat 2/2)	Baptist Leveson-Gower	
Newcastle-upon-Tyne (seat 1/2)	Sir Walter Calverley Blackett	
Newcastle-upon-Tyne (seat 2/2)	Matthew Ridley	
Newport (Cornwall) (seat 1/2)	John Lee	
Newport (Cornwall) (seat 2/2)	Edward Bacon	Administration
Newport (Isle of Wight) (seat 1/2)	Thomas Lee Dummer	
Newport (Isle of Wight) (seat 2/2)	Ralph Jenison	
New Radnor Boroughs (seat 1/1)	Thomas Lewis	
New Romney (seat 1/2)	Sir Francis Dashwood, Bt	
New Romney (seat 2/2)	Henry Furnese	
New Shoreham (seat 1/2)	Robert Bristow	
New Shoreham (seat 2/2)	Richard Stratton	
Newton (Lancashire) (seat 1/2)	Peter Legh	
Newton (Lancashire) (seat 2/2)	Randle Wilbraham	
Newtown (Isle of Wight) (seat 1/2)	Sir John Barrington	
Newtown (Isle of Wight) (seat 2/2)	Harcourt Powell	
New Windsor (seat 1/2)	Henry Fox	Administration
New Windsor (seat 2/2)	John Fitzwilliam	
New Woodstock (seat 1/2)	The 2nd Viscount Bateman	
New Woodstock (seat 2/2)	Anthony Keck	
Norfolk (seat 1/2)	George Townshend	Administration
Norfolk (seat 2/2)	Armine Wodehouse	Tory
Northallerton (seat 1/2)	Edwin Lascelles	
Northallerton (seat 2/2)	Daniel Lascelles	
Northampton (seat 1/2)	George Compton	
Northampton (seat 2/2)	Charles Montagu	
Northamptonshire (seat 1/2)	Sir Edmund Isham, Bt	Tory
Northamptonshire (seat 2/2)	Valentine Knightley	
Northern Burghs	see Tain Burghs	...
Northumberland (seat 1/2)	Sir William Middleton	
Northumberland (seat 2/2)	Sir Henry Grey, 2nd Baronet	
Norwich (seat 1/2)	Lord Hobart	
Norwich (seat 2/2)	Horatio Walpole (1678–1757)	
Nottingham (seat 1/2)	The 3rd Viscount Howe	Administration
Nottingham (seat 2/2)	Sir Willoughby Aston, Bt	Tory
Nottinghamshire (seat 1/2)	Lord Robert Manners-Sutton	
Nottinghamshire (seat 2/2)	John Thornhagh later Hewett	
== O ==
Okehampton (seat 1/2)	Sir George Lyttelton, Bt	
Okehampton (seat 2/2)	Robert Vyner	
Old Sarum (seat 1/2)	Viscount Pulteney	
Old Sarum (seat 2/2)	Thomas Pitt	
Orford (seat 1/2)	Henry Bilson Legge	
Orford (seat 2/2)	John Offley	
Orkney and Shetland (seat 1/1)	James Douglas	
Oxford (seat 1/2)	Robert Lee	Tory
Oxford (seat 2/2)	Thomas Rowney	Tory
Oxfordshire (seat 1/2)	Viscount Parker	Admin. (see note a)
Oxfordshire (seat 2/2)	Sir Edward Turner	Admin. (see note a)
Oxford University (seat 1/2)	Sir Roger Newdigate, Bt	Tory
Oxford University (seat 2/2)	Peregrine Palmer	Tory
== P ==
Peeblesshire (seat 1/1)	John Dickson	
Pembroke Boroughs (seat 1/1)	Hugh Barlow	
Pembrokeshire (seat 1/1)	Sir William Owen	
Penryn (seat 1/2)	Richard Edgcumbe	
Penryn (seat 2/2)	George Boscawen	
Perth Burghs (seat 1/1)	Thomas Leslie	
Perthshire (seat 1/1)	Lord John Murray	
Peterborough (seat 1/2)	Edward Wortley Montagu	
Peterborough (seat 2/2)	Matthew Lamb	
Petersfield (seat 1/2)	William Gerard Hamilton	
Petersfield (seat 2/2)	William Beckford	
Plymouth (seat 1/2)	The 2nd Viscount Barrington	
Plymouth (seat 2/2)	Samuel Dicker	
Plympton Erle (seat 1/2)	George Treby	
Plympton Erle (seat 2/2)	William Baker	Administration
Pontefract (seat 1/2)	The 2nd Viscount Galway	
Pontefract (seat 2/2)	Sambrooke Freeman	Administration
Poole (seat 1/2)	Sir Richard Lyttelton	
Poole (seat 2/2)	Joseph Gulston	
Portsmouth (seat 1/2)	Sir William Rowley	
Portsmouth (seat 2/2)	Sir Edward Hawke	
Preston (seat 1/2)	Nicholas Fazackerley	
Preston (seat 2/2)	Edmund Starkie	
== Q ==
Queenborough (seat 1/2)	Charles Frederick	
Queenborough (seat 2/2)	Sir Peircy Brett	
== R ==
Radnor Boroughs	see New Radnor Boroughs	...
Radnorshire (seat 1/1)	Sir Humphrey Howorth	
Reading (seat 1/2)	William Strode	Tory
Reading (seat 2/2)	The 2nd Viscount Fane	Opposition Whig
Reigate (seat 1/2)	Charles Yorke	
Reigate (seat 2/2)	Charles Cocks	
Renfrewshire (seat 1/1)	William Mure	
Richmond (Yorkshire) (seat 1/2)	Earl of Ancram	
Richmond (Yorkshire) (seat 2/2)	John Yorke	
Ripon (seat 1/2)	William Aislabie	doubtful
Ripon (seat 2/2)	Sir Charles Vernon	
Rochester (seat 1/2)	Nicholas Haddock	
Rochester (seat 2/2)	John Byng	
Romney	see New Romney	...
Ross-shire (seat 1/1)	Lord Fortrose	
Roxburghshire (seat 1/1)	Walter Scott	
Rutland (seat 1/2)	Thomas Noel	Tory
Rutland (seat 2/2)	Lord Burghley	
Rye (seat 1/2)	Phillips Gybbon	
Rye (seat 2/2)	George Onslow	
== S ==
St Albans (seat 1/2)	James West	
St Albans (seat 2/2)	James Grimston	
St Germans (seat 1/2)	Edward Eliot	
St Germans (seat 2/2)	Anthony Champion	
St Ives (seat 1/2)	George Hobart	
St Ives (seat 2/2)	James Whitshed	
St Mawes (seat 1/2)	Robert Nugent	
St Mawes (seat 2/2)	Henry Seymour Conway	
St Michael's	see Mitchell	...
Salisbury (seat 1/2)	Hon. William Bouverie	see note (d)
Salisbury (seat 2/2)	Julines Beckford	see note (d)
Saltash (seat 1/2)	Viscount Duncannon	
Saltash (seat 2/2)	George Clinton	
Sandwich (seat 1/2)	John Clevland	
Sandwich (seat 2/2)	Claudius Amyand	Administration
Sarum	see Old Sarum or for New Sarum see Salisbury	...
Scarborough (seat 1/2)	William Osbaldeston	
Scarborough (seat 2/2)	Sir Ralph Milbanke	
Seaford (seat 1/2)	William Hall Gage	
Seaford (seat 2/2)	William Hay	
Selkirkshire (seat 1/1)	Gilbert Elliot	
Shaftesbury (seat 1/2)	James Brudenell	
Shaftesbury (seat 2/2)	Sir Thomas Clavering	
Shoreham	see New Shoreham	...
Shrewsbury (seat 1/2)	Thomas Hill	
Shrewsbury (seat 2/2)	Robert More	
Shropshire (seat 1/2)	Sir John Astley, Bt	Tory
Shropshire (seat 2/2)	Richard Lyster	Tory
Somerset (seat 1/2)	Sir Charles Kemys Tynte	
Somerset (seat 2/2)	Thomas Prowse	
Southampton (seat 1/2)	Anthony Langley Swymmer	
Southampton (seat 2/2)	Hans Stanley	
Southwark (seat 1/2)	William Belchier	
Southwark (seat 2/2)	William Hammond	
Stafford (seat 1/2)	William Richard Chetwynd	
Stafford (seat 2/2)	Hon. William Richard Chetwynd	
Staffordshire (seat 1/2)	William Leveson-Gower	Administration
Staffordshire (seat 2/2)	William Bagot	Tory
Stamford (seat 1/2)	John Harvey-Thursby	
Stamford (seat 2/2)	Robert Barbor	doubtful
Steyning (seat 1/2)	Hitch Younge	
Steyning (seat 2/2)	Alexander Hume	
Stirling Burghs (seat 1/1)	George Haldane	
Stirlingshire (seat 1/1)	James Campbell	
Stockbridge (seat 1/2)	John Gibbons	
Stockbridge (seat 2/2)	George Hay	
Sudbury (seat 1/2)	Thomas Fonnereau	
Sudbury (seat 2/2)	Thomas Walpole	
Suffolk (seat 1/2)	Sir Cordell Firebrace	Tory
Suffolk (seat 2/2)	John Affleck	Tory
Surrey (seat 1/2)	Arthur Onslow	(Speaker)
Surrey (seat 2/2)	Thomas Budgen	
Sussex (seat 1/2)	Thomas Pelham	
Sussex (seat 2/2)	John Butler	
Sutherland (seat 1/1)	George Mackay	
== T ==
Tain Burghs (seat 1/1)	Sir Harry Munro, Bt	
Tamworth (seat 1/2)	Thomas Villiers	
Tamworth (seat 2/2)	Sir Robert Burdett	
Taunton (seat 1/2)	The 3rd Baron Carpenter	
Taunton (seat 2/2)	John Halliday	
Tavistock (seat 1/2)	Richard Rigby	
Tavistock (seat 2/2)	Jeffrey French	
Tewkesbury (seat 1/2)	Nicolson Calvert	
Tewkesbury (seat 2/2)	John Martin	
Thetford (seat 1/2)	Lord Henry Beauclerk	
Thetford (seat 2/2)	Charles Fitzroy Scudamore	
Thirsk (seat 1/2)	Thomas Frankland	
Thirsk (seat 2/2)	Roger Talbot	
Tiverton (seat 1/2)	Sir William Yonge, Bt	Administration
Tiverton (seat 2/2)	Henry Pelham	
Totnes (seat 1/2)	Sir John Strange	
Totnes (seat 2/2)	Browse Trist	
Tregony (seat 1/2)	William Trevanion	
Tregony (seat 2/2)	John Fuller	
Truro (seat 1/2)	Edward Boscawen	
Truro (seat 2/2)	John Boscawen	
== W ==
Wallingford (seat 1/2)	John Hervey	
Wallingford (seat 2/2)	Richard Neville Aldworth	Opposition Whig
Wareham (seat 1/2)	Henry Drax	(see note b)
Wareham (seat 2/2)	William Augustus Pitt	(see note b)
Warwick (seat 1/2)	The 1st Earl of Hillsborough	
Warwick (seat 2/2)	Henry Archer	doubtful
Warwickshire (seat 1/2)	Sir Charles Mordaunt	
Warwickshire (seat 2/2)	William Craven	
Wells (seat 1/2)	The 6th Baron Digby	Administration
Wells (seat 2/2)	Charles Tudway	
Wendover (seat 1/2)	The 2nd Earl Verney	
Wendover (seat 2/2)	John Calvert	
Wenlock (seat 1/2)	William Forester	
Wenlock (seat 2/2)	Brooke Forester	
Weobley (seat 1/2)	John Craster	
Weobley (seat 2/2)	Savage Mostyn	
Westbury (seat 1/2)	Chauncy Townsend	
Westbury (seat 2/2)	Peregrine Bertie	
West Looe (seat 1/2)	John Frederick	
West Looe (seat 2/2)	William Noel	
Westminster (seat 1/2)	Hon. Edward Cornwallis	
Westminster (seat 2/2)	Sir John Crosse, Bt	
Westmorland (seat 1/2)	George Dalston	
Westmorland (seat 2/2)	John Dalston	
Weymouth and Melcombe Regis (seat 1/4)	Lord John Cavendish	
Weymouth and Melcombe Regis (seat 2/4)	George Bubb Dodington	
Weymouth and Melcombe Regis (seat 3/4)	Welbore Ellis	
Weymouth and Melcombe Regis (seat 4/4)	John Tucker	
Whitchurch (seat 1/2)	William Powlett	
Whitchurch (seat 2/2)	Thomas Townshend	
Wigan (seat 1/2)	Richard Barry	
Wigan (seat 2/2)	Sir William Meredith, Bt	
Wigtown Burghs (seat 1/1)	John Hamilton	
Wigtownshire (seat 1/1)	James Stewart	
Wilton (seat 1/2)	Robert Herbert	
Wilton (seat 2/2)	William Herbert	
Wiltshire (seat 1/2)	Sir Robert Long, Bt	
Wiltshire (seat 2/2)	Edward Popham	
Winchelsea (seat 1/2)	Thomas Orby Hunter	
Winchelsea (seat 2/2)	Arnold Nesbitt	
Winchester (seat 1/2)	Marquess of Carnarvon	
Winchester (seat 2/2)	Henry Penton	
Windsor	see New Windsor	...
Woodstock	see New Woodstock	...
Wootton Bassett (seat 1/2)	John Probyn	
Wootton Bassett (seat 2/2)	Thomas Estcourt Cresswell	
Worcester (seat 1/2)	Henry Crabb-Boulton	
Worcester (seat 2/2)	Thomas Vernon	
Worcestershire (seat 1/2)	John Bulkeley Coventry	
Worcestershire (seat 2/2)	Edmund Pytts	
Wycombe	see Chipping Wycombe	...
== Y ==
Yarmouth (Isle of Wight) (seat 1/2)	Thomas Holmes	
Yarmouth (Isle of Wight) (seat 2/2)	Henry Holmes	
Yarmouth (Norfolk)	see Great Yarmouth	...
York (seat 1/2)	Sir John Armytage, Bt	Administration
York (seat 2/2)	George Fox Lane	Tory
Yorkshire (seat 1/2)	The 3rd Viscount Downe	
Yorkshire (seat 2/2)	Sir Conyers Darcy	

== By-elections ==
- List of Great Britain by-elections (1754–74)

== Notes ==
- (a) There was a double return for both seats at Oxfordshire. The House of Commons decided on 23 April 1755 that Viscount Parker and Sir Edward Turner were duly elected and rejected the claims of the 6th Viscount Wenman and Sir James Dashwood.
- (b) There was a double return for both seats at Wareham. The House of Commons decided, on 30 December 1754, that Henry Drax and William Augustus Pitt were duly elected and rejected the claims of Thomas Erle Drax and John Pitt.
- (c) There was a double return for the second seat at Bury St Edmunds as Augustus John Hervey and Felton Hervey were tied (with 15 votes each). The House of Commons declared the election for this seat void on 2 December 1754. Felton Hervey (Administration) was returned unopposed at a by-election on 9 December 1754.
- (d) There was a triple return for the two seats at Salisbury. The House of Commons decided, on 26 November 1754, that William Bouverie and Julines Beckford were duly elected and rejected the claim of Edward Poore.

== See also ==
- 1754 British general election
- List of parliaments of Great Britain
- Unreformed House of Commons
