= First Newcastle ministry =

Government of Great Britain

- Cabinet of Great Britain
- 1754 – 1756
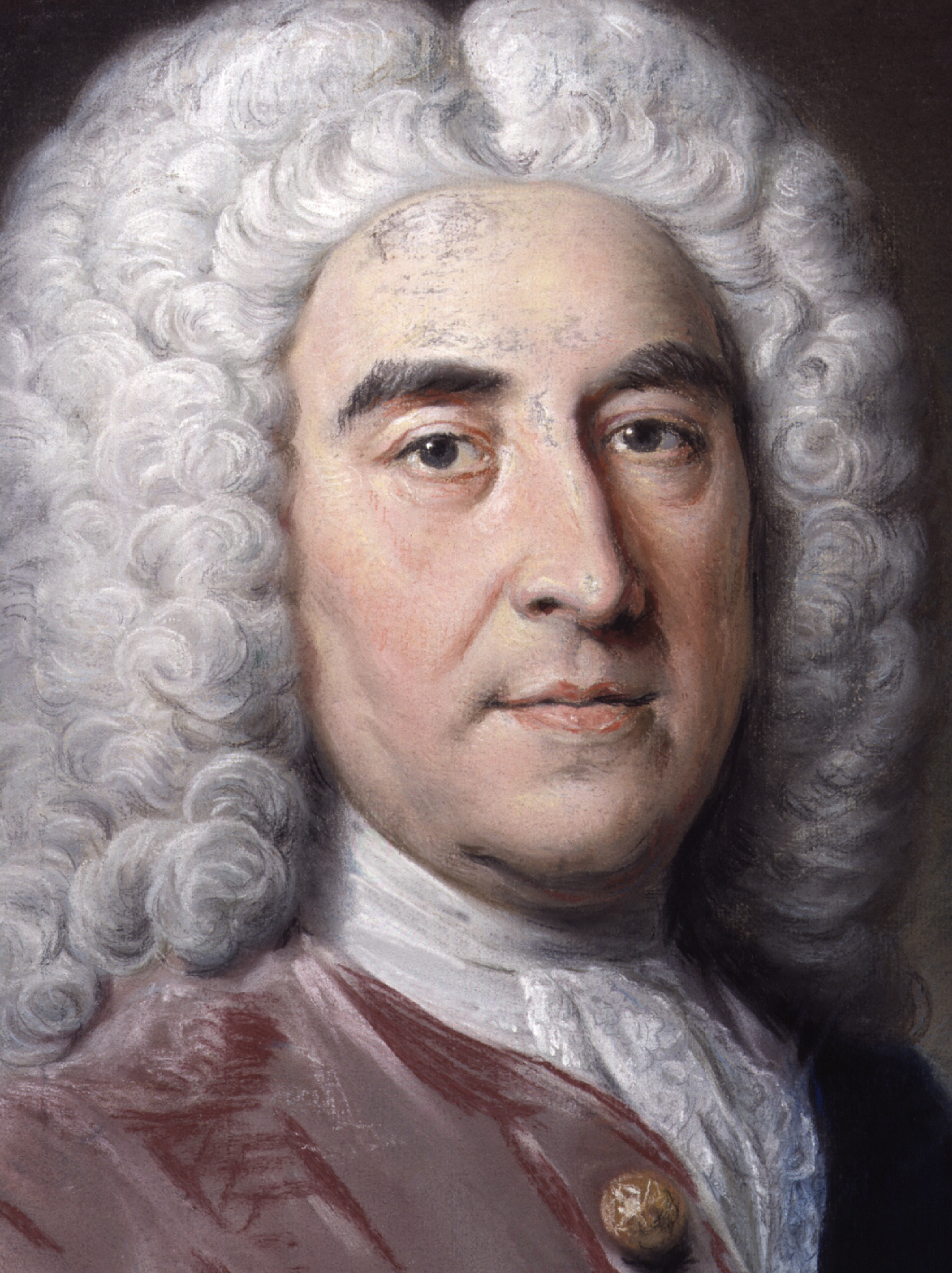
- Thomas Pelham-Holles, 1st Duke of Newcastle, was prime minister and led the government.
- Date formed: 16 March 1754
- Date dissolved: 11 November 1756

People and organisations
- Monarch: George II
- Prime Minister: Thomas Pelham-Holles, 1st Duke of Newcastle
- Member party: Whigs
- Status in legislature: Majority
- Opposition party: Tories

History
- Election: 1754 general election
- Legislature terms: 1754–1761
- Predecessor: Broad Bottom ministry
- Successor: Pitt–Devonshire ministry

From 1754 to 1756, Thomas Pelham-Holles, 1st Duke of Newcastle headed the government of Great Britain. After the death of the previous prime minister, his brother Henry Pelham, Newcastle had formed a new administration of Whigs. He remained in power until 1756 when his government collapsed following the fall of Minorca and the fierce criticism that he had come under for his handling of the Seven Years' War that was engulfing Europe.

Among the most influential members of the first Newcastle ministry was Henry Fox, who served as Leader of the House of Commons from November 1755, having initially entered the Cabinet in his earlier position of Secretary at War in December 1754.

== Ministry ==
It is unclear who was a member of the Cabinet.

Cabinet members
Portfolio	Minister	Took office	Left office
First Lord of the Treasury; Leader of the House of Lords	Thomas Pelham-Holles, 1st Duke of Newcastle (head of ministry)	1754	1756
Chancellor of the Exchequer	Sir William Lee	1754	1754
Chancellor of the Exchequer	Henry Bilson-Legge	1754	1755
Chancellor of the Exchequer	Sir George Lyttelton	1755	1756
Second Lord of the Treasury	Henry Vane, 1st Earl of Darlington	1754	1755
Second Lord of the Treasury	Sir George Lyttelton	1755	1756
Lord Chancellor	Philip Yorke, 1st Earl of Hardwicke	1754	1756
Lord President of the Council	John Carteret, 2nd Earl Granville	1754	1756
Lord Privy Seal	John Leveson-Gower, 1st Earl Gower	1754	1755
Lord Privy Seal	Charles Spencer, 3rd Duke of Marlborough	1755	1755
Lord Privy Seal	Granville Leveson-Gower, 2nd Earl Gower	1755	1756
Secretary of State for the Southern Department; Leader of the House of Commons	Thomas Robinson	1754	1755
Secretary of State for the Southern Department; Leader of the House of Commons	Henry Fox	1755	1756
Secretary of State for the Northern Department	Robert Darcy, 4th Earl of Holderness	1754	1756
Master-General of the Ordnance	Vacant	1754	1755
Master-General of the Ordnance	Charles Spencer, 3rd Duke of Marlborough	1755	1756
First Lord of the Admiralty	George Anson, 1st Baron Anson	1754	1756
Keeper of the Great Seal of Scotland	Archibald Campbell, 3rd Duke of Argyll	1754	1756
Lord Chamberlain of the Household	Charles FitzRoy, 2nd Duke of Grafton	1754	1756
Lord Steward of the Household	Charles Spencer, 3rd Duke of Marlborough	1754	1755
Lord Steward of the Household	John Manners, 3rd Duke of Rutland	1755	1756
Chancellor of the Duchy of Lancaster	Richard Edgcumbe, 1st Baron Edgcumbe	1754	1756
Lord Lieutenant of Ireland	Lionel Sackville, 1st Duke of Dorset	1754	1755
Lord Lieutenant of Ireland	William Cavendish, 4th Duke of Devonshire	1755	1756
Master of the Horse	William Cavendish, Marquess of Hartington	1754	1755
Master of the Horse	Lionel Sackville, 1st Duke of Dorset	1755	1756
Paymaster of the Forces	William Pitt	1754	1755
Paymaster of the Forces	The Earl of Darlington; Thomas Hay, Viscount Dupplin	1755	1756

== See also ==
- 11th Parliament of Great Britain
- 1754 British general election
- Great Britain in the Seven Years' War

== Works cited ==
- Haydn, Joseph (1851), The Book of Dignities, London: Longmans, Brown, Green, and Longmans

Preceded by Broad Bottom ministry	Government of Great Britain; 16 March 1754 – 11 November 1756	Succeeded by Pitt–Devonshire ministry
