= Thomas Medlycott (1697–1763) =

Thomas Medlycott was one of the two members of Parliament for Milborne Port from 1734 to 1742 and 1747 to 1763. There is no record of him having spoken in Parliament.
