= Leader of the House of Commons =

Political role in the UK Government

United Kingdom Leader of the House of Commons

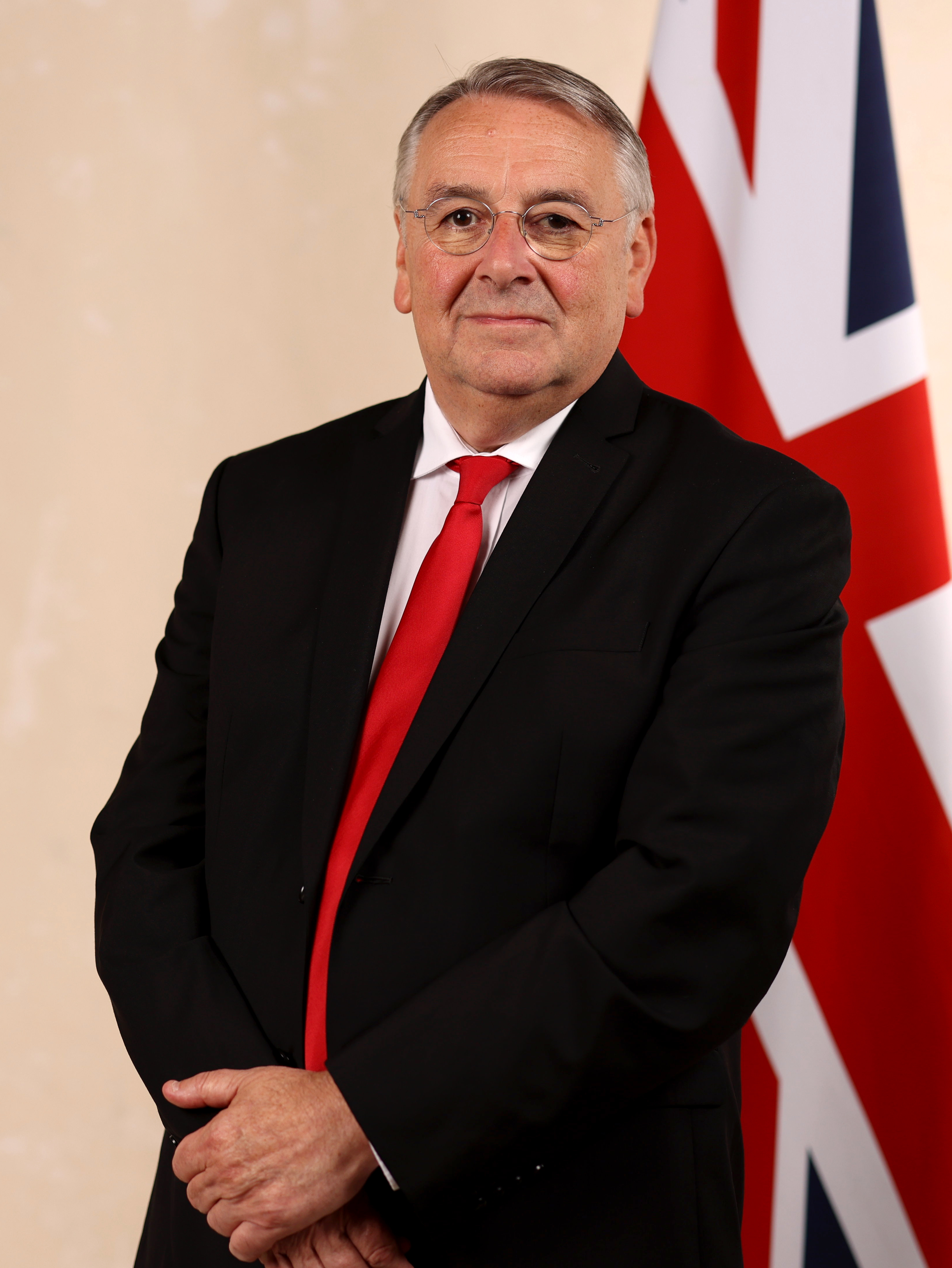
- Incumbent; Alan Campbell since 5 September 2025
- Cabinet Office; Office of the Leader of the House of Commons
- Style: The Right Honourable
- Formation: 4 April 1721
- First holder: Robert Walpole
- Salary: £159,038 per annum (2022) (including £86,584 MP salary)
- Website: gov.uk/leader-commons

The leader of the House of Commons is a minister of the Crown of the Government of the United Kingdom whose main role is organising government business in the House of Commons. The Leader is always a member or attendee of the cabinet of the United Kingdom. From 1721 to 1942, the Prime Minister usually held this position.

The House of Commons devotes approximately three-quarters of its time to debating and explaining government business, such as bills introduced by the government and ministerial statements. The Leader of the House of Commons, with the parties' chief whips ("the usual channels"), is responsible for organising government business and providing time for non-government (backbench) business to be put before the House of Commons.

The position of leader of the House of Commons is currently held by Alan Campbell, who was appointed on 5 September 2025 by Keir Starmer as a part of the cabinet reshuffle following the resignation of Angela Rayner from government. He was re-appointed by Andy Burnham on 20 July 2026.

== Responsibilities ==
The current responsibilities of the Leader of the House of Commons are as follows:

- Planning and supervising the Government's Legislative Programme;
- Chairing the Cabinet Committee on Parliamentary Business and Legislation;
- Managing the business of the House of Commons and preparing weekly statements on upcoming business;
- Facilitating motions and debate in the Chamber;
- Serving as the Government's representative in the House, namely as a voting member of the House of Commons Commission, the Public Accounts Commission, the Members Estimate Committee, and the Speaker's Committee for the Independent Parliamentary Standards Authority;
- Reforming parliamentary procedure and operations;
- Representing the House of Commons within Government, be it contributing to the Civil Service's efforts to build parliamentary capability or receiving MPs' requests for assistance on ministerial correspondence and questions; and
- Ministerial responsibility for the Privy Council Office.

The Osmotherly Rules, which set out guidance on how civil servants should respond to parliamentary select committees, are jointly updated by the Office of the Leader of the House of Commons and the Cabinet Office.

== History ==
The title was not established until about the middle of the 19th century, although the institution is much older.

Until 1942, the title was usually held by the prime minister if he sat in the House of Commons; however, in more recent years, the title has been held by a separate politician.

The title holder is not formally appointed by the Crown and the title alone does not attract a salary, so is now usually held in addition to a sinecure, currently Lord President of the Council.

== List of Leaders of the House of Commons (1721–present) ==
Leader Constituency	Term of office		Other ministerial offices held as Leader	Party	Ministry
Robert Walpole; MP for King's Lynn	4 April 1721	6 February 1742	Prime Minister; First Lord of the Treasury; Chancellor of the Exchequer	Whig	Walpole–Townshend
Robert Walpole; MP for King's Lynn	4 April 1721	6 February 1742	Prime Minister; First Lord of the Treasury; Chancellor of the Exchequer	Whig	Walpole
Samuel Sandys; MP for Worcester	12 February 1742	27 August 1743	Chancellor of the Exchequer	Whig	Carteret
Henry Pelham; MP for Sussex	27 August 1743	6 March 1754†	Prime Minister; First Lord of the Treasury; Chancellor of the Exchequer	Whig	Carteret
Henry Pelham; MP for Sussex	27 August 1743	6 March 1754†	Prime Minister; First Lord of the Treasury; Chancellor of the Exchequer	Whig	Broad Bottom (I & II)
Thomas Robinson; MP for Christchurch	23 March 1754	October; 1755	Secretary of State for the Southern Department	Whig	Newcastle I
Henry Fox; MP for Windsor	14 November 1755	13 November 1756	Secretary of State for the Southern Department	Whig	Newcastle I
William Pitt 'the Elder'; MP for Okehampton	4 December 1756	6 April 1757	Secretary of State for the Southern Department	Whig	Pitt–Devonshire
Vacant	April; 1757	June; 1757			1757 Caretaker
William Pitt 'the Elder'; MP for Bath	27 June 1757	6 October 1761	Secretary of State for the Southern Department	Whig	Pitt–Newcastle
George Grenville; MP for Buckingham	October; 1761	May; 1762	Treasurer of the Navy	Whig	Pitt–Newcastle
Henry Fox; MP for Dunwich	May; 1762	April; 1763	Paymaster of the Forces	Whig	Bute (Tory–Whig)
George Grenville; MP for Buckingham	16 April 1763	13 July 1765	Prime Minister; First Lord of the Treasury; Chancellor of the Exchequer	Whig	Grenville
Henry Seymour Conway; MP for Thetford	July; 1765	20 January 1768	Secretary of State for the Southern Department until May 1766; Secretary of State for the Northern Department from May 1766	Whig	Rockingham I
Henry Seymour Conway; MP for Thetford	July; 1765	20 January 1768	Secretary of State for the Southern Department until May 1766; Secretary of State for the Northern Department from May 1766	Whig	Chatham (Whig–Tory)
Frederick North; Lord North; MP for Banbury	20 January 1768	22 March 1782	Prime Minister from 28 January 1770; First Lord of the Treasury from 28 January 1770; Chancellor of the Exchequer	Tory	Chatham (Whig–Tory)
Frederick North; Lord North; MP for Banbury	20 January 1768	22 March 1782	Prime Minister from 28 January 1770; First Lord of the Treasury from 28 January 1770; Chancellor of the Exchequer	Tory	Grafton (Whig–Tory)
Frederick North; Lord North; MP for Banbury	20 January 1768	22 March 1782	Prime Minister from 28 January 1770; First Lord of the Treasury from 28 January 1770; Chancellor of the Exchequer	Tory	North
Charles James Fox; MP for Westminster	27 March 1782	July; 1782	Secretary of State for Foreign Affairs	Whig	Rockingham II
Thomas Townshend; MP for Whitchurch	10 July 1782	6 March 1783	Secretary of State for the Home Department	Whig	Shelburne (Whig–Tory)
Charles James Fox; MP for Westminster	2 April 1783	19 December 1783	Secretary of State for Foreign Affairs	Whig	Fox–North
Frederick North; Lord North; MP for Banbury	2 April 1783	19 December 1783	Secretary of State for the Home Department	Tory	Fox–North
William Pitt 'the Younger'; MP for Appleby until 1784; MP for Cambridge University from 1784	19 December 1783	14 March 1801	Prime Minister; First Lord of the Treasury; Chancellor of the Exchequer	Tory	Pitt I
Henry Addington; MP for Devizes	17 March 1801	10 May 1804	Prime Minister; First Lord of the Treasury; Chancellor of the Exchequer	Tory	Addington
William Pitt 'the Younger'; MP for Cambridge University	10 May 1804	23 January 1806†	Prime Minister; First Lord of the Treasury; Chancellor of the Exchequer	Tory	Pitt II
Charles James Fox; MP for Westminster	February; 1806	13 September 1806†	Secretary of State for Foreign Affairs	Whig	All the Talents
Charles Grey; Viscount Howick; MP for Northumberland	September; 1806	31 March 1807	Secretary of State for Foreign Affairs	Whig	All the Talents
Spencer Perceval; MP for Northampton	April; 1807	11 May 1812†	Chancellor of the Exchequer; Chancellor of the Duchy of Lancaster; Prime Minister from October 1809; First Lord of the Treasury from October 1809	Tory	Portland II
Spencer Perceval; MP for Northampton	April; 1807	11 May 1812†	Chancellor of the Exchequer; Chancellor of the Duchy of Lancaster; Prime Minister from October 1809; First Lord of the Treasury from October 1809	Tory	Perceval
Robert Stewart; Viscount Castlereagh; MP for Down until 1821; MP for Orford from 1821; The Marquess of Londonderry from 1821	June; 1812	12 August 1822†	Secretary of State for Foreign Affairs	Tory	Liverpool
George Canning; MP for Liverpool until 1823; MP for Harwich 1823–1826; MP for Newport 1826–1827; MP for Seaford from 1827	16 September 1822	8 August 1827†	Secretary of State for Foreign Affairs until April 1827; Prime Minister from April 1827; First Lord of the Treasury from April 1827; Chancellor of the Exchequer from April 1827	Tory	Liverpool
George Canning; MP for Liverpool until 1823; MP for Harwich 1823–1826; MP for Newport 1826–1827; MP for Seaford from 1827	16 September 1822	8 August 1827†	Secretary of State for Foreign Affairs until April 1827; Prime Minister from April 1827; First Lord of the Treasury from April 1827; Chancellor of the Exchequer from April 1827	Tory	Canning (Canningite–Whig)
William Huskisson; MP for Liverpool	3 September 1827	21 January 1828	Secretary of State for War and the Colonies	Tory	Goderich (Canningite–Whig)
Robert Peel; MP for Oxford University until 1829; MP for Westbury from 1829	26 January 1828	16 November 1830	Secretary of State for the Home Department	Tory	Wellington–Peel
John Spencer; Viscount Althorp; MP for Northamptonshire until 1832; MP for South Northamptonshire from 1832	22 November 1830	14 November 1834	Chancellor of the Exchequer	Whig	Grey
John Spencer; Viscount Althorp; MP for Northamptonshire until 1832; MP for South Northamptonshire from 1832	22 November 1830	14 November 1834	Chancellor of the Exchequer	Whig	Melbourne I
Vacant	14 November 1834	10 December 1834			Wellington Caretaker
Robert Peel; MP for Tamworth	10 December 1834	8 April 1835	Prime Minister; First Lord of the Treasury; Chancellor of the Exchequer	Conservative	Peel I
Lord John Russell; MP for Stroud	18 April 1835	30 August 1841	Secretary of State for the Home Department until August 1839; Secretary of State for War and the Colonies from August 1839	Whig	Melbourne II
Robert Peel; MP for Tamworth	30 August 1841	29 June 1846	Prime Minister; First Lord of the Treasury	Conservative	Peel II
Lord John Russell; MP for City of London	30 June 1846	21 February 1852	Prime Minister; First Lord of the Treasury	Whig	Russell I
Benjamin Disraeli; MP for Buckinghamshire	27 February 1852	17 December 1852	Chancellor of the Exchequer	Conservative	Who? Who?
Lord John Russell; MP for City of London	28 December 1852	30 January 1855	Secretary of State for Foreign Affairs until February 1853; Minister without Portfolio February 1853 – June 1854; Lord President of the Council from June 1854	Whig	Aberdeen (Peelite–Whig)
Henry John Temple; The Viscount Palmerston; MP for Tiverton	6 February 1855	19 February 1858	Prime Minister; First Lord of the Treasury	Whig	Palmerston I
Benjamin Disraeli; MP for Buckinghamshire	26 February 1858	11 June 1859	Chancellor of the Exchequer	Conservative	Derby–Disraeli II
Henry John Temple; The Viscount Palmerston; MP for Tiverton	12 June 1859	18 October 1865†	Prime Minister; First Lord of the Treasury	Liberal	Palmerston II
William Ewart Gladstone; MP for South Lancashire	October; 1865	26 June 1866	Chancellor of the Exchequer	Liberal	Russell II
Benjamin Disraeli; MP for Buckinghamshire	6 July 1866	1 December 1868	Chancellor of the Exchequer until February 1868; Prime Minister from February 1868; First Lord of the Treasury from February 1868	Conservative	Derby–Disraeli III
William Ewart Gladstone; MP for Greenwich	3 December 1868	17 February 1874	Prime Minister; First Lord of the Treasury; Chancellor of the Exchequer from August 1873	Liberal	Gladstone I
Benjamin Disraeli; MP for Buckinghamshire	20 February 1874	21 August 1876	Prime Minister; First Lord of the Treasury	Conservative	Disraeli II
Stafford Northcote; MP for Devonshire North	21 August 1876	21 April 1880	Chancellor of the Exchequer	Conservative	Disraeli II
William Ewart Gladstone; MP for Midlothian	23 April 1880	9 June 1885	Prime Minister; First Lord of the Treasury; Chancellor of the Exchequer until December 1882	Liberal	Gladstone II
Michael Hicks-Beach; MP for Bristol West	24 June 1885	28 January 1886	Chancellor of the Exchequer	Conservative	Salisbury I
William Ewart Gladstone; MP for Midlothian	1 February 1886	2 July 1886	Prime Minister; First Lord of the Treasury; Lord Privy Seal	Liberal	Gladstone III
Lord Randolph Churchill; MP for Paddington South	3 August 1886	14 January 1887	Chancellor of the Exchequer	Conservative	Salisbury II
W. H. Smith; MP for Strand	17 January 1887	October; 1891	First Lord of the Treasury	Conservative	Salisbury II
Arthur Balfour; MP for Manchester East	October; 1891	11 August 1892	First Lord of the Treasury	Conservative	Salisbury II
William Ewart Gladstone; MP for Midlothian	15 August 1892	2 March 1894	Prime Minister; First Lord of the Treasury; Lord Privy Seal	Liberal	Gladstone IV
William Harcourt; MP for Derby	2 March 1894	21 June 1895	Chancellor of the Exchequer	Liberal	Rosebery
Arthur Balfour; MP for Manchester East	29 June 1895	4 December 1905	Prime Minister from July 1902; First Lord of the Treasury; Lord Privy Seal July 1902 – October 1903	Conservative	Salisbury (III & IV) (Con.–Lib.U.)
Arthur Balfour; MP for Manchester East	29 June 1895	4 December 1905	Prime Minister from July 1902; First Lord of the Treasury; Lord Privy Seal July 1902 – October 1903	Conservative	Balfour (Con.–Lib.U.)
Henry Campbell-Bannerman; MP for Stirling Burghs	5 December 1905	5 April 1908	Prime Minister; First Lord of the Treasury	Liberal	Campbell-Bannerman
H. H. Asquith; MP for East Fife	5 April 1908	5 December 1916	Prime Minister; First Lord of the Treasury; Secretary of State for War March – August 1914	Liberal	Asquith (I–III)
H. H. Asquith; MP for East Fife	5 April 1908	5 December 1916	Prime Minister; First Lord of the Treasury; Secretary of State for War March – August 1914	Liberal	Asquith Coalition (Lib.–Con.–Lab.)
Bonar Law; MP for Bootle until 1918; MP for Glasgow Central from 1918	10 December 1916	23 March 1921	Chancellor of the Exchequer until January 1919; Lord Privy Seal from January 1919	Conservative	Lloyd George (I & II) (Lib.–Con.–Lab.)
Austen Chamberlain; MP for Birmingham West	23 March 1921	19 October 1922	Lord Privy Seal	Conservative	Lloyd George (I & II) (Lib.–Con.–Lab.)
Bonar Law; MP for Glasgow Central	23 October 1922	20 May 1923	Prime Minister; First Lord of the Treasury	Conservative	Law
Stanley Baldwin; MP for Bewdley	22 May 1923	22 January 1924	Prime Minister; First Lord of the Treasury; Chancellor of the Exchequer until August 1923	Conservative	Baldwin I
Ramsay MacDonald; MP for Aberavon	22 January 1924	3 November 1924	Prime Minister; First Lord of the Treasury; Secretary of State for Foreign Affairs	Labour	MacDonald I
Stanley Baldwin; MP for Bewdley	4 November 1924	4 June 1929	Prime Minister; First Lord of the Treasury	Conservative	Baldwin II
Ramsay MacDonald; MP for Seaham	5 June 1929	7 June 1935	Prime Minister; First Lord of the Treasury	Labour	MacDonald II
Ramsay MacDonald; MP for Seaham	5 June 1929	7 June 1935	Prime Minister; First Lord of the Treasury	National Labour	National I (N.Lab.–Con.–Lib.N. –Lib.)
Ramsay MacDonald; MP for Seaham	5 June 1929	7 June 1935	Prime Minister; First Lord of the Treasury	National Labour	National II (N.Lab.–Con.–Lib.N. –Lib. until 1932)
Stanley Baldwin; MP for Bewdley	7 June 1935	28 May 1937	Prime Minister; First Lord of the Treasury	Conservative	National III (Con.–N.Lab.–Lib.N.)
Neville Chamberlain; MP for Birmingham Edgbaston	28 May 1937	10 May 1940	Prime Minister; First Lord of the Treasury	Conservative	National IV (Con.–N.Lab.–Lib.N.)
Neville Chamberlain; MP for Birmingham Edgbaston	28 May 1937	10 May 1940	Prime Minister; First Lord of the Treasury	Conservative	Chamberlain War (Con.–N.Lab.–Lib.N.)
Winston Churchill; MP for Epping	10 May 1940	19 February 1942	Prime Minister; First Lord of the Treasury; Minister of Defence	Conservative	Churchill War (All parties)
Stafford Cripps; MP for Bristol East	19 February 1942	22 November 1942	Lord Privy Seal	Independent	Churchill War (All parties)
Anthony Eden; MP for Warwick and Leamington	22 November 1942	26 July 1945	Foreign Secretary	Conservative	Churchill War (All parties)
Anthony Eden; MP for Warwick and Leamington	22 November 1942	26 July 1945	Foreign Secretary	Conservative	Churchill Caretaker (Con.–N.Lib.)
Herbert Morrison; MP for Lewisham East until 1950; MP for Lewisham South from 1950	27 July 1945	9 March 1951	Deputy Prime Minister; Lord President of the Council	Labour	Attlee (I & II)
James Chuter Ede; MP for South Shields	9 March 1951	26 October 1951	Secretary of State for the Home Department	Labour	Attlee (I & II)
Harry Crookshank; MP for Gainsborough	28 October 1951	20 December 1955	Minister of Health until May 1952; Lord Privy Seal from May 1952	Conservative	Churchill III
Harry Crookshank; MP for Gainsborough	28 October 1951	20 December 1955	Minister of Health until May 1952; Lord Privy Seal from May 1952	Conservative	Eden
Rab Butler; MP for Saffron Walden	20 December 1955	9 October 1961	Lord Privy Seal until October 1959; Secretary of State for the Home Department from January 1957	Conservative	Eden
Rab Butler; MP for Saffron Walden	20 December 1955	9 October 1961	Lord Privy Seal until October 1959; Secretary of State for the Home Department from January 1957	Conservative	Macmillan (I & II)
Iain Macleod; MP for Enfield West	9 October 1961	20 October 1963	Chancellor of the Duchy of Lancaster	Conservative	Macmillan (I & II)
Selwyn Lloyd; MP for Wirral	20 October 1963	16 October 1964	Lord Privy Seal	Conservative	Douglas-Home
Herbert Bowden; MP for Leicester South West	16 October 1964	11 August 1966	Lord President of the Council	Labour	Wilson (I & II)
Richard Crossman; MP for Coventry East	11 August 1966	18 October 1968	Lord President of the Council	Labour	Wilson (I & II)
Fred Peart; MP for Workington	18 October 1968	19 June 1970	Lord President of the Council	Labour	Wilson (I & II)
William Whitelaw; MP for Penrith and The Border	20 June 1970	7 April 1972	Lord President of the Council	Conservative	Heath
Robert Carr; MP for Mitcham	7 April 1972	5 November 1972	Lord President of the Council	Conservative	Heath
Jim Prior; MP for Lowestoft	5 November 1972	4 March 1974	Lord President of the Council	Conservative	Heath
Edward Short; MP for Newcastle upon Tyne Central	5 March 1974	8 April 1976	Lord President of the Council	Labour	Wilson (III & IV)
Michael Foot; MP for Ebbw Vale	8 April 1976	4 May 1979	Lord President of the Council	Labour	Callaghan
Norman St John-Stevas; MP for Chelmsford	5 May 1979	5 January 1981	Chancellor of the Duchy of Lancaster; Minister for the Arts	Conservative	Thatcher I
Francis Pym; MP for Cambridgeshire	5 January 1981	5 April 1982	Chancellor of the Duchy of Lancaster until September 1981; Lord President of the Council from September 1981	Conservative	Thatcher I
John Biffen; MP for Oswestry until 1983; MP for Shropshire North from 1983	5 April 1982	13 June 1987	Lord President of the Council until June 1983; Lord Privy Seal from 11 June 1983	Conservative	Thatcher I
John Biffen; MP for Oswestry until 1983; MP for Shropshire North from 1983	5 April 1982	13 June 1987	Lord President of the Council until June 1983; Lord Privy Seal from 11 June 1983	Conservative	Thatcher II
John Wakeham; MP for South Colchester and Maldon	13 June 1987	24 July 1989	Lord Privy Seal until January 1988; Lord President of the Council from 10 January 1988	Conservative	Thatcher III
Geoffrey Howe; MP for East Surrey	24 July 1989	2 November 1990	Lord President of the Council; Deputy Prime Minister	Conservative	Thatcher III
John MacGregor; MP for South Norfolk	2 November 1990	10 April 1992	Lord President of the Council	Conservative	Thatcher III
John MacGregor; MP for South Norfolk	2 November 1990	10 April 1992	Lord President of the Council	Conservative	Major I
Tony Newton; MP for Braintree	10 April 1992	2 May 1997	Lord President of the Council	Conservative	Major II
Ann Taylor; MP for Dewsbury	2 May 1997	27 July 1998	Lord President of the Council	Labour	Blair I
Margaret Beckett; MP for Derby South	27 July 1998	8 June 2001	Lord President of the Council	Labour	Blair I
Robin Cook; MP for Livingston	8 June 2001	17 March 2003	Lord President of the Council	Labour	Blair II
John Reid; MP for Hamilton North and Bellshill	4 April 2003	13 June 2003	Lord President of the Council	Labour	Blair II
Peter Hain; MP for Neath	11 June 2003	6 May 2005	Lord Privy Seal; Secretary of State for Wales	Labour	Blair II
Geoff Hoon; MP for Ashfield	6 May 2005	5 May 2006	Lord Privy Seal	Labour	Blair III
Jack Straw; MP for Blackburn	5 May 2006	28 June 2007	Lord Privy Seal	Labour	Blair III
Harriet Harman; MP for Camberwell and Peckham	28 June 2007	11 May 2010	Lord Privy Seal; Minister for Women and Equality	Labour	Brown
George Young; MP for North West Hampshire	12 May 2010	3 September 2012	Lord Privy Seal	Conservative	Cameron–Clegg (Con.–L.D.)
Andrew Lansley; MP for South Cambridgeshire	4 September 2012	14 July 2014	Lord Privy Seal	Conservative	Cameron–Clegg (Con.–L.D.)
William Hague; MP for Richmond (Yorks)	14 July 2014	8 May 2015	First Secretary of State	Conservative	Cameron–Clegg (Con.–L.D.)
Chris Grayling; MP for Epsom and Ewell	9 May 2015	14 July 2016	Lord President of the Council	Conservative	Cameron II
David Lidington; MP for Aylesbury	14 July 2016	11 June 2017	Lord President of the Council	Conservative	May I
Andrea Leadsom; MP for South Northamptonshire	11 June 2017	22 May 2019	Lord President of the Council	Conservative	May II
Mel Stride; MP for Central Devon	23 May 2019	24 July 2019	Lord President of the Council	Conservative	May II
Jacob Rees-Mogg; MP for North East Somerset	24 July 2019	8 February 2022	Lord President of the Council	Conservative	Johnson I
Jacob Rees-Mogg; MP for North East Somerset	24 July 2019	8 February 2022	Lord President of the Council	Conservative	Johnson II
Mark Spencer; MP for Sherwood	8 February 2022	6 September 2022	Lord President of the Council	Conservative	Johnson II
Penny Mordaunt; MP for Portsmouth North	6 September 2022	5 July 2024	Lord President of the Council	Conservative	Truss
Penny Mordaunt; MP for Portsmouth North	6 September 2022	5 July 2024	Lord President of the Council	Conservative	Sunak
Lucy Powell; MP for Manchester Central	5 July 2024	5 September 2025	Lord President of the Council	Labour	Starmer
Alan Campbell; MP for Tynemouth	5 September 2025	Incumbent	Lord President of the Council	Labour	Starmer
Alan Campbell; MP for Tynemouth	5 September 2025	Incumbent	Lord President of the Council	Labour	Burnham

== Deputy Leader of the House of Commons ==
From 1922, when the prime minister was also Leader of the House of Commons, day-to-day duties were frequently carried out by a Deputy Leader of the House of Commons. At other times, a Deputy Leader of the House of Commons was appointed merely to enhance an individual politician's standing within the government.

The title has been in use since 1942, but was not used from the 2019 dissolution of the Second May ministry to 2022, when it was revived by Boris Johnson. This was shortlived, however, as it was abolished by Liz Truss after she became Prime Minister a few months later.

=== List of Deputy Leaders of the House of Commons ===
Deputy Leader	Term start	Term end	Other ministerial offices held as Leader	Party	Ministry
Paddy Tipping	23 December 1998	11 June 2001	Parliamentary Secretary for the Privy Council Office	Labour	Blair I
Stephen Twigg	11 June 2001	29 May 2002	Parliamentary Secretary for the Privy Council Office	Labour Co-op	Blair II
Ben Bradshaw	29 May 2002	13 June 2003		Labour	Blair II
Phil Woolas	13 June 2003	9 May 2005		Labour	Blair II
Nigel Griffiths	10 May 2005	13 March 2007		Labour	Blair III
Paddy Tipping	28 March 2007	27 June 2007		Labour	Blair III
Helen Goodman	28 June 2007	5 October 2008		Labour	Brown
Chris Bryant	5 October 2008	9 June 2009		Labour	Brown
Barbara Keeley	9 June 2009	11 May 2010		Labour	Brown
David Heath	14 May 2010	4 September 2012		Liberal Democrat	Cameron–Clegg
Tom Brake	4 September 2012	8 May 2015	Lord Commissioner of the Treasury from November 2014	Liberal Democrat	Cameron–Clegg
Thérèse Coffey	11 May 2015	17 July 2016		Conservative	Cameron II
Michael Ellis	17 July 2016	9 January 2018		Conservative	May I
Michael Ellis	17 July 2016	9 January 2018		Conservative	May II
Chris Heaton-Harris	9 January 2018	9 July 2018	Comptroller of the Household	Conservative	May II
Mark Spencer	15 July 2018	24 July 2019	Comptroller of the Household	Conservative	May II
Peter Bone	8 July 2022	27 September 2022		Conservative	Johnson II

== See also ==
- Leader of the House of Lords
- Speaker of the House of Commons
- Shadow Leader of the House of Commons
- Minister for Parliamentary Business, the equivalent cabinet post in the Scottish Government
