= 1754 British general election =

Election in Great Britain

- 18 April – 20 May 1754

All 558 seats in the House of Commons 280 seats needed for a majority
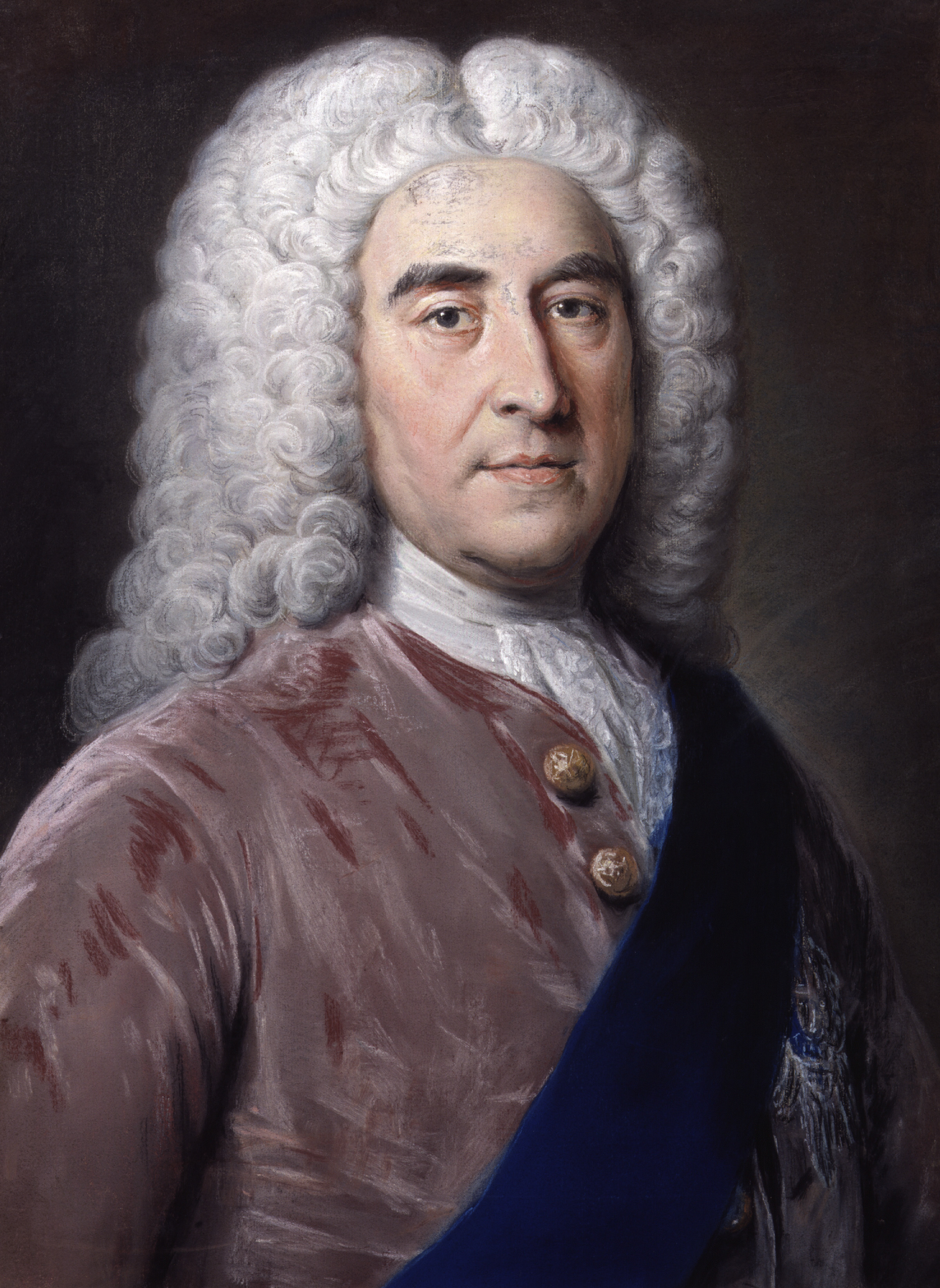
| | First party | Second party | Third party |
|---|---|---|---|
| | | Tory | Pat |
| Leader | Duke of Newcastle | — | — |
| Party | Whig | Tory | Patriot Whigs |
| Leader's seat | House of Lords | — | — |
| Seats won | 368 | 106 | 42 |
| Seat change | ▲30 | ▼11 | ▼52 |
- Composition of the House of Commons after the election
Prime Minister before election
Duke of Newcastle
Whig
Prime Minister after election
Duke of Newcastle
Whig

The 1754 British general election returned members to serve in the House of Commons of the 11th Parliament of Great Britain to be summoned, after the merger of the Parliament of England and the Parliament of Scotland in 1707. Owing to the extensive corruption and the Duke of Newcastle's personal influence in the pocket boroughs, the government was returned to office with a working majority.

The old parties had disappeared almost completely by this stage; anyone with reasonable hopes of achieving office called himself a 'Whig', although the term had lost most of its original meaning. While 'Tory' and 'Whig' were still used to refer to particular political leanings and tendencies, parties in the old sense were no longer relevant except in a small minority of constituencies, such as Oxfordshire, with most elections being fought on local issues and the holders of political power being determined by the shifting allegiance of factions and aristocratic families rather than the strength or popularity of any organised parties. A small group of members of parliament still considered themselves Tories, but they were almost totally irrelevant to practical politics and entirely excluded from holding public office. The 106 seats they held at this election is the fewest they have ever held in history. In seats percentage terms, the Tories held 19% of the seats - the lowest proportion ever until surpassed by its successor Conservative Party's 18.62% (or 121 of 650 seats) won 270 years later.

The resulting eleventh Parliament of Great Britain was convened on 31 May 1754 and sat through eight sessions until its dissolution on 20 April 1761.

== Summary of the constituencies ==
See 1796 British general election for details. The constituencies used were the same throughout the existence of the Parliament of Great Britain.

== Dates of election ==
The general election was held between 13 April 1754 and 20 May 1754.

At this period elections did not take place at the same time in every constituency. The returning officer in each county or parliamentary borough fixed the precise date (see hustings for details of the conduct of the elections).

== Results ==

=== Seats summary ===
Parliamentary seats
| Whig | 71.3% |
| Tory | 20.5% |
| Patriot | 8.3% |

== See also ==
- List of parliaments of Great Britain
- 11th Parliament of Great Britain
- List of MPs elected in the 1754 British general election
- Oxfordshire in the 1754 British general election
