= List of MPs elected in the 1722 British general election =

1722–1727 Parliament of Great Britain
←	1715–1722 Parliament	1727–1734 Parliament	→

Overview
- Legislative body: Parliament of Great Britain
- Meeting place: Palace of Westminster
- Term: 9 October 1722 – 5 August 1727
- Election: 1722 British general election
- Government: Walpole–Townshend ministry

House of Commons
- Members: 558
- Speaker: Spencer Compton
- Leader: Robert Walpole
- Prime Minister: Robert Walpole

House of Lords
- Lord Chancellor: Baron King (from 1 June 1725); In commission (7 January 1725–1 June 1725); Earl of Macclesfield (until 7 January 1725)
- Leader: Viscount Townshend

Crown-in-Parliament George I

Sessions
- 1st: 9 October 1722 – 27 May 1723
- 2nd: 9 January 1724 – 24 April 1724
- 3rd: 12 November 1724 – 31 May 1725
- 4th: 20 January 1726 – 24 May 1726
- 5th: 17 January 1727 – 15 May 1727
- 6th: 27 June 1727 – 17 July 1727

This is a list of the 558 MPs or members of Parliament elected to the 314 constituencies of the Parliament of Great Britain in 1722, the 6th Parliament of Great Britain, and their replacements returned at subsequent by-elections, arranged by constituency.

Table of contents:

A B C D E F G H I J K L M N O P Q R S T U V W X Y Z By-elections Changes

== A ==
Aberdeen Burghs (seat 1/1)	William Kerr – unseated on petition Replaced by John Middleton 1722	. Whig
Aberdeenshire (seat 1/1)	Sir Archibald Grant, Bt	
Abingdon (seat 1/1)	Robert Hucks	Whig
Aldborough (seat 1/2)	Charles Stanhope	Whig
Aldborough (seat 2/2)	William Jessop	Whig
Aldeburgh (seat 1/2)	Walter Plumer	Whig
Aldeburgh (seat 2/2)	Samuel Lowe	
Amersham (seat 1/2)	Montague Garrard Drake - sat for Buckinghamshire; Replaced by Thomas Chapman 1722	Tory; Tory
Amersham (seat 2/2)	The Viscount Fermanagh	Tory
Andover (seat 1/2)	James Brudenell	Whig
Andover (seat 2/2)	William Guidott	Whig
Anglesey (seat 1/1)	The Viscount Bulkeley - died Replaced by Hugh Williams 1725	Tory; Whig
Anstruther Easter Burghs (seat 1/1)	Philip Anstruther	
Appleby (seat 1/2)	Sackville Tufton	Tory
Appleby (seat 2/2)	Sir Richard Sandford - died Replaced by James Lowther 1723	Whug; Whig
Argyllshire (seat 1/1)	Sir James Campbell	
Arundel (seat 1/2)	Thomas Lumley	
Arundel (seat 2/2)	Joseph Micklethwaite	
Ashburton (seat 1/2)	Richard Reynell	Tory
Ashburton (seat 2/2)	Roger Tuckfield	Whig
Aylesbury (seat 1/2)	Richard Abell	Tory
Aylesbury (seat 2/2)	John Guise	Whig
Ayr Burghs (seat 1/1)	William Steuart	Whig
Ayrshire (seat 1/1)	John Montgomerie	
== B ==
Banbury (seat 1/1)	Monoux Cope	
Banffshire (seat 1/1)	Alexander Abercromby	
Barnstaple (seat 1/2)	Lieutenant-General Thomas Whetham	
Barnstaple (seat 2/2)	Sir Hugh Acland	
Bath (seat 1/2)	General George Wade	
Bath (seat 2/2)	John Codrington	
Beaumaris (seat 1/1)	Hon. Henry Bertie	
Bedford (seat 1/2)	William Farrer	Whig
Bedford (seat 2/2)	George Huxley - Took office Replaced by John Thurlow Brace 1725	. Whig
Bedfordshire (seat 1/2)	Hon. Charles Leigh	Tory
Bedfordshire (seat 2/2)	Sir Rowland Alston, 4th Bt	Whig
Bere Alston (seat 1/2)	Sir John Hobart -sat for St. Ives; Replaced by Sir Robert Rich 1724	
Bere Alston (seat 2/2)	St John Brodrick	
Berkshire (seat 1/2)	Sir John Stonhouse, Bt	Tory
Berkshire (seat 2/2)	Robert Packer	Tory
Berwickshire (seat 1/1)	George Baillie	
Berwick-upon-Tweed (seat 1/2)	Grey Neville - died Replaced by William Kerr 1723	Whig
Berwick-upon-Tweed (seat 2/2)	The Viscount Barrington - expelled Replaced by Henry Grey 1723	Whig
Beverley (seat 1/2)	Sir Charles Hotham, Bt; Replaced by Sir Charles Hotham	Whig; Whig
Beverley (seat 2/2)	Michael Newton	
Bewdley (seat 1/1)	Crewe Offley	Whig
Bishop's Castle (seat 1/2)	William Peere Williams	
Bishop's Castle (seat 2/2)	Bowater Vernon; Replaced by Charles Mason 1726	
Bletchingley (seat 1/2)	George Evelyn - died Replaced by Henry Herbert 1724	
Bletchingley (seat 2/2)	William Clayton	
Bodmin (seat 1/2)	Isaac le Heup	
Bodmin (seat 2/2)	Richard West - died Replaced by John LaRoche 1727	. Whig
Boroughbridge (seat 1/2)	Conyers Darcy -sat for Richmond; Replaced by Joseph Danvers 1722	
Boroughbridge (seat 2/2)	James Tyrrell	
Bossiney (seat 1/2)	Robert Corker	
Bossiney (seat 2/2)	Henry Kelsall	
Boston (seat 1/2)	Henry Pacey	
Boston (seat 2/2)	Richard Ellys	Whig
Brackley (seat 1/2)	Hon. William Egerton	
Brackley (seat 2/2)	Paul Methuen	Whig
Bramber (seat 1/2)	Sir Richard Gough	
Bramber (seat 2/2)	William Charles van Huls - died Replaced by David Polhill 1723	
Brecon (seat 1/1)	William Morgan -sat for Monmouthshire; Replaced by Thomas Morgan 1723	
Breconshire (seat 1/1)	William Gwyn Vaughan	
Bridgnorth (seat 1/2)	William Whitmore - died Replaced by St John Charlton 1725	
Bridgnorth (seat 2/2)	John Weaver	
Bridgwater (seat 1/2)	George Bubb Dodington	Whig
Bridgwater (seat 2/2)	Thomas Palmer	Tory
Bridport (seat 1/2)	Peter Walter	
Bridport (seat 2/2)	Dewey Bulkeley	
Bristol (seat 1/2)	Sir Abraham Elton, Bt I	Whig
Bristol (seat 2/2)	Joseph Earle	
Buckingham (seat 1/2)	Alexander Denton - Took office Replaced by William Heathcote 1722	
Buckingham (seat 2/2)	Richard Grenville - died Replaced by John Fane 1727	
Buckinghamshire (seat 1/2)	Montague Garrard Drake	
Buckinghamshire (seat 2/2)	Sir Thomas Lee, 3rd Bt.	
Bury St Edmunds (seat 1/2)	James Reynolds - took office Replaced by Lord Hervey 1725	
Bury St Edmunds (seat 2/2)	Sir Jermyn Davers, Bt	
Buteshire (seat 1/1)	Patrick Campbell	
== C ==
Caernarvon Boroughs (seat 1/1)	Sir Thomas Wynn, Bt	Whig
Caernarvonshire (seat 1/1)	John Griffith	Whig
Caithness (seat 0/0)	Alternating seat with Buteshire -unrepresented in this Parliament	
Callington (seat 1/2)	Thomas Coplestone	Whig
Callington (seat 2/2)	Thomas Lutwyche	
Calne (seat 1/2)	Benjamin Haskins-Stiles -sat for Devizes; Replaced by Edmund Pike Heath 1723	
Calne (seat 2/2)	George Duckett - took office Replaced by Matthew Ducie Moreton 1723	
Cambridge (seat 1/2)	Sir John Hynde Cotton - sat for Cambridgeshire; Replaced by Gilbert Affleck 1722	Tory.
Cambridge (seat 2/2)	Thomas Bacon	Tory
Cambridgeshire (seat 1/2)	Sir John Hynde Cotton	Tory
Cambridgeshire (seat 2/2)	Lord Harley -succeeded to a peerage Replaced by Samuel Shepheard 1724	
Cambridge University (seat 1/2)	Hon. Dixie Windsor	
Cambridge University (seat 2/2)	Thomas Willoughby	
Camelford (seat 1/2)	The Earl of Drogheda	
Camelford (seat 2/2)	William Sloper	
Canterbury (seat 1/2)	Samuel Milles	
Canterbury (seat 2/2)	Sir Thomas Hales, Bt	
Cardiff Boroughs (seat 1/1)	Edward Stradling - died Replaced by Bussy Mansel 1727	
Cardigan Boroughs (seat 1/1)	Stephen Parry - died Replaced by Thomas Powell 2 April 1725	
Cardiganshire (seat 1/1)	Francis Cornwallis	
Carlisle (seat 1/2)	James Bateman	Tory
Carlisle (seat 2/2)	Henry Aglionby	Tory
Carmarthen (seat 1/1)	Richard Vaughan - died Replaced by James Phillips 1725	
Carmarthenshire (seat 1/1)	Edward Rice – unseated on petition Replaced by Sir Nicholas Williams	. Whig
Castle Rising (seat 1/2)	William Feilding - died Replaced by The Earl of Mountrath 1724	
Castle Rising (seat 2/2)	Charles Churchill	Whig
Cheshire (seat 1/2)	Charles Cholmondeley	Tory
Cheshire (seat 2/2)	John Offley-Crewe	Whig
Chester (seat 1/2)	Sir Henry Bunbury, Bt	Tory
Chester (seat 2/2)	Sir Richard Grosvenor, Bt	
Chichester (seat 1/2)	Earl of March - succeeded to a peerage Replaced by Lord William Beauclerk 1724	
Chichester (seat 2/2)	Thomas Miller	
Chippenham (seat 1/2)	Sir John Eyles	
Chippenham (seat 2/2)	Edward Rolt - died Replaced by Thomas Boucher 1723	
Chipping Wycombe (seat 1/2)	Charles Egerton; Replaced by Viscount Milsington 1726- unseated on petition Replaced by Harry Waller 1726	.. Whig
Chipping Wycombe (seat 2/2)	The Earl of Shelburne	
Christchurch (seat 1/2)	Sir Peter Mews - died Replaced by Jacob Banks 1726	
Christchurch (seat 2/2)	Francis Gwyn -sat for Wells; Replaced by Edward Prideaux Gwyn 1724	
Cirencester (seat 1/2)	Thomas Master	Tory
Cirencester (seat 2/2)	Benjamin Bathurst	Tory
City of Durham	see Durham (City of)	...
City of London	see London (City of)	...
Clackmannanshire (seat 1/1)	Sir John Shaw, 3rd Baronet	
Clitheroe (seat 1/2)	Thomas Lister	Tory
Clitheroe (seat 2/2)	Nathaniel Curzon	
Clyde Burghs	see Glasgow Burghs	...
Cockermouth (seat 1/2)	Wilfrid Lawson	Whig
Cockermouth (seat 2/2)	Thomas Pengelly - took office Replaced by William Finch 1727	. Whig
Colchester (seat 1/2)	Sir Thomas Webster	Whig
Colchester (seat 2/2)	Matthew Martin	Whig
Corfe Castle (seat 1/2)	Denis Bond	
Corfe Castle (seat 2/2)	John Bankes	
Cornwall (seat 1/2)	Sir William Carew, Bt	Tory
Cornwall (seat 2/2)	Sir John St Aubyn, Bt	Tory
County Durham	see Durham (County)	...
Coventry (seat 1/2)	Sir Adolphus Oughton	Whig
Coventry (seat 2/2)	John Neale	
Cricklade (seat 1/2)	Sir Thomas Reade	Whig
Cricklade (seat 2/2)	Thomas Gore	
Cromartyshire (seat 0/0)	Alternating seat with Nairnshire - unrepresented in this Parliament	
Cumberland (seat 1/2)	Sir Christopher Musgrave, Bt	
Cumberland (seat 2/2)	Gilfrid Lawson	
== D ==
Dartmouth (seat 1/2)	George Treby	
Dartmouth (seat 2/2)	Thomas Martyn	
Denbigh Boroughs (seat 1/1)	Robert Myddelton	
Denbighshire (seat 1/1)	Watkin Williams	Tory
Derby (seat 1/2)	Lord James Cavendish	
Derby (seat 2/2)	Thomas Bayley	Whig
Derbyshire (seat 1/2)	Godfrey Clarke	
Derbyshire (seat 2/2)	John Curzon	
Devizes (seat 1/2)	Sir Joseph Eyles	
Devizes (seat 2/2)	Benjamin Haskins Stiles	
Devon (seat 1/2)	Sir William Courtenay	
Devon (seat 2/2)	Sir Coplestone Bampfylde, Bt	Tory
Dorchester (seat 1/2)	Edmund Morton Pleydell – unseated on petition Replaced by William Chapple 1723	
Dorchester (seat 2/2)	Joseph Damer	
Dorset (seat 1/2)	George Chafin	
Dorset (seat 2/2)	Thomas Strangways - died Replaced by George Pitt 1727	
Dover (seat 1/2)	George Berkeley	
Dover (seat 2/2)	Henry Furnese	
Downton (seat 1/2)	John Verney	
Downton (seat 2/2)	Giles Eyre	
Droitwich (seat 1/2)	Richard Foley	
Droitwich (seat 2/2)	Edward Jeffreys - died Replaced by Thomas Winnington 1726	
Dumfries Burghs (seat 1/1)	William Douglas	
Dumfriesshire (seat 1/1)	Charles Erskine	
Dunbartonshire (seat 1/1)	Mungo Haldane – unseated on petition Replaced by Hon. John Campbell 1725	
Dunwich (seat 1/2)	Sir George Downing, Bt	
Dunwich (seat 2/2)	Edward Vernon - sat for Penryn; Replaced by Sir John Ward 1722 - died Replaced by John Sambrooke 1726	
Durham (City of) (seat 1/2)	Thomas Conyers	
Durham (City of) (seat 2/2)	Charles Talbot	
Durham (County) (seat 1/2)	Sir John Eden	Tory
Durham (County) (seat 2/2)	John Hedworth	Independent Whig
Dysart Burghs (seat 1/1)	James St Clair	
== E ==
East Grinstead (seat 1/2)	John Conyers - died Replaced by Edward Conyers 1725	
East Grinstead (seat 2/2)	Spencer Compton -sat for Sussex; Replaced by The Viscount Shannon 1722	
East Looe (seat 1/2)	John Smith - died Replaced by George Cholmondeley 1724	Whig; Whig
East Looe (seat 2/2)	Horatio Walpole -sat for Great Yarmouth; Replaced by William Lowndes 1722 - died Replaced by Sir Henry Hoghton 1724	Whig..
East Retford (seat 1/2)	Thomas White	Whig
East Retford (seat 2/2)	Patrick Chaworth	
Edinburgh (seat 1/1)	John Campbell	
Edinburghshire (seat 1/1)	Robert Dundas	Tory
Elgin Burghs (seat 1/1)	William Fraser; Replaced by John Campbell, later Duke of Argyll 1725	. Whig
Elginshire (seat 1/1)	Alexander Brodie	
Essex (seat 1/2)	Robert Honywood	
Essex (seat 2/2)	William Harvey	
Evesham (seat 1/2)	Sir John Rushout	Whig
Evesham (seat 2/2)	John Rudge	Whig
Exeter (seat 1/2)	John Rolle	
Exeter (seat 2/2)	Francis Drewe	Tory
Eye (seat 1/2)	Edward Hopkins	
Eye (seat 2/2)	Spencer Compton -sat for Sussex; Replaced by James Cornwallis 1722	. Whig
== F ==
Fife (seat 1/1)	Sir John Anstruther	
Flint Boroughs (seat 1/1)	Thomas Eyton	
Flintshire (seat 1/1)	Sir Roger Mostyn	
Forfarshire (seat 1/1)	James Scott	
Fowey (seat 1/2)	John Goodall - died Replaced by William Bromley 1725	
Fowey (seat 2/2)	Nicholas Vincent - died Replaced by The Viscount FitzWilliam 1727	
== G ==
Gatton (seat 1/2)	William Newland	
Gatton (seat 2/2)	Paul Docminique	
Glamorganshire (seat 1/1)	Sir Charles Kemeys	
Glasgow Burghs (seat 1/1)	Daniel Campbell	
Gloucester (seat 1/2)	John Snell - died Replaced by John Howe 1727	
Gloucester (seat 2/2)	Charles Hyett	
Gloucestershire (seat 1/2)	Henry Berkeley	
Gloucestershire (seat 2/2)	Kinard de la Bere	
Grampound (seat 1/2)	Marquess of Hartington	Whig
Grampound (seat 2/2)	Humphry Morice	Whig
Grantham (seat 1/2)	Francis Fisher	
Grantham (seat 2/2)	The Viscount Tyrconnel	
Great Bedwyn (seat 1/2)	Robert Bruce	
Great Bedwyn (seat 2/2)	Charles Longueville	
Great Grimsby (seat 1/2)	Benjamin Collyer	
Great Grimsby (seat 2/2)	Charles Pelham	
Great Marlow (seat 1/2)	Edmund Waller	
Great Marlow (seat 2/2)	Sir John Guise	
Great Yarmouth (seat 1/2)	Charles Townshend - ennobled Replaced by William Townshend 1723	
Great Yarmouth (seat 2/2)	Horatio Walpole	
Guildford (seat 1/2)	Arthur Onslow	Whig
Guildford (seat 2/2)	Thomas Brodrick	Whig
== H ==
Haddington Burghs (seat 1/1)	Sir James Dalrymple, 2nd Baronet	
Haddingtonshire (seat 1/1)	John Cockburn	
Hampshire (seat 1/2)	Lord Harry Powlett	
Hampshire (seat 2/2)	Lord Nassau Powlett	
Harwich (seat 1/2)	Sir Philip Parker-a-Morley-Long, Bt	
Harwich (seat 2/2)	Humphrey Parsons	
Haslemere (seat 1/2)	James Oglethorpe	Tory
Haslemere (seat 2/2)	Peter Burrell	
Hastings (seat 1/2)	Archibald Hutcheson	
Hastings (seat 2/2)	Sir William Ashburnham	
Haverfordwest (seat 1/1)	Francis Edwardes - died Replaced by Sir Erasmus Philipps 1726	
Hedon (seat 1/2)	Daniel Pulteney - sat for Preston; Replaced by Harry Pulteney	Whig
Hedon (seat 2/2)	William Pulteney	Whig
Helston (seat 1/2)	Sir Robert Raymond; Replaced by Sir Clement Wearg 1724 - died Replaced by Exton Sayer 1726	Tory; Whig.
Helston (seat 2/2)	Walter Carey	
Hereford (seat 1/2)	Herbert Rudhale Westfaling	
Hereford (seat 2/2)	William Mayo - died Replaced by James Wallwyn 1723	
Herefordshire (seat 1/2)	Velters Cornewall	
Herefordshire (seat 2/2)	Sir Edward Goodere, Bt	
Hertford (seat 1/2)	Edward Harrison - took office Replaced by George Harrison 1727	
Hertford (seat 2/2)	Charles Caesar – unseated on petition Replaced by Sir Thomas Clarke 1723	
Hertfordshire (seat 1/2)	Ralph Freman	
Hertfordshire (seat 2/2)	Sir Thomas Sebright, Bt	
Heytesbury (seat 1/2)	Edward Ashe	
Heytesbury (seat 2/2)	Pierce A'Court - died Replaced by Lord Charles Cavendish 1725	
Higham Ferrers (seat 1/1)	Thomas Watson Wentworth - died Replaced by John Finch 1724	
Hindon (seat 1/2)	Henry Ludlow Coker	
Hindon (seat 2/2)	Robert Gray	
Honiton (seat 1/2)	Sir William Pole	
Honiton (seat 2/2)	Sir William Yonge	Whig
Horsham (seat 1/2)	Charles Eversfield	
Horsham (seat 2/2)	Henry Ingram	
Huntingdon (seat 1/2)	Edward Wortley Montagu	
Huntingdon (seat 2/2)	Roger Handasyde	
Huntingdonshire (seat 1/2)	John Bigg	
Huntingdonshire (seat 2/2)	Viscount Hinchingbrooke - died Replaced by John Proby 1722	
Hythe (seat 1/2)	Captain Hercules Baker	
Hythe (seat 2/2)	Sir Samuel Lennard	
== I ==
Ilchester (seat 1/2)	William Burroughs - took office Replaced by Thomas Paget 1722	
Ilchester (seat 2/2)	Daniel Moore	
Inverness Burghs (seat 1/1)	Duncan Forbes	
Inverness-shire (seat 1/1)	Sir James Grant, Bt.	Whig
Ipswich (seat 1/2)	William Thompson	Whig
Ipswich (seat 2/2)	Francis Negus	Whig
== K ==
Kent (seat 1/2)	Sir Edward Knatchbull, 4th Bt	
Kent (seat 2/2)	Sir Thomas Twisden	
Kincardineshire (seat 1/1)	James Scott	
King's Lynn (seat 1/2)	Sir Robert Walpole	Whig
King's Lynn (seat 2/2)	Sir Charles Turner	
Kingston upon Hull (seat 1/2)	Sir William St Quintin - died Replaced by George Crowle 1724	Tory
Kingston upon Hull (seat 2/2)	Nathaniel Rogers	Tory
Kinross-shire (seat 0/0)	Alternating seat with Clackmannanshire - unrepresented in this Parliament	
Kirkcudbright Stewartry (seat 1/1)	Alexander Murray	
Knaresborough (seat 1/2)	Richard Arundell	
Knaresborough (seat 2/2)	Sir Henry Slingsby, Bt	
== L ==
Lanarkshire (seat 1/1)	Lord Archibald Hamilton	
Lancashire (seat 1/2)	Sir John Bland	
Lancashire (seat 2/2)	Richard Shuttleworth	Tory
Lancaster (seat 1/2)	William Heysham - died Replaced by Christopher Tower 1727	
Lancaster (seat 2/2)	Sir Thomas Lowther	
Launceston (seat 1/2)	Alexander Pendarves - died Replaced by John Freind 1725	
Launceston (seat 2/2)	John Freind - unseated on petition Replaced by John Willes 1724 - took office Replaced by Henry Vane 31 May 1726	
Leicester (seat 1/2)	Lawrence Carter - took office Replaced by Thomas Boothby Skrymsher 1727	
Leicester (seat 2/2)	Sir George Beaumont	
Leicestershire (seat 1/2)	Edmund Morris	
Leicestershire (seat 2/2)	Lord William Manners	
Leominster (seat 1/2)	Sir Archer Croft	
Leominster (seat 2/2)	Sir George Caswall	
Lewes (seat 1/2)	Thomas Pelham	
Lewes (seat 2/2)	Henry Pelham - died Replaced by Sir Nicholas Pelham 1726	
Lichfield (seat 1/2)	Walter Chetwynd	
Lichfield (seat 2/2)	Richard Plumer	
Lincoln (seat 1/2)	Sir John Tyrwhitt, Bt	
Lincoln (seat 2/2)	Sir John Monson	
Lincolnshire (seat 1/2)	Sir William Massingberd - died Replaced by Robert Vyner 1724	
Lincolnshire (seat 2/2)	Henry Heron	
Linlithgow Burghs (seat 1/1)	Daniel Weir - died Replaced by John Murray 1725	
Linlithgowshire (seat 1/1)	George Dundas	
Liskeard (seat 1/2)	Edward Eliot - died Replaced by Thomas Clutterbuck 1722	Tory
Liskeard (seat 2/2)	John Lansdell	
Liverpool (seat 1/2)	Sir Thomas Johnson - took office Replaced by Langham Booth 1723 - died Replaced by Thomas Brereton 1724	Whig
Liverpool (seat 2/2)	William Cleiveland - died Replaced by Thomas Bootle 1724	
London (City of) (seat 1/4)	Richard Lockwood	Tory
London (City of) (seat 2/4)	Sir John Barnard	Whig
London (City of) (seat 3/4)	Peter Godfrey; Replaced by Richard Hopkins 1724	Tory
London (City of) (seat 4/4)	Francis Child	Whig
Lostwithiel (seat 1/2)	Marquess of Hartington -sat for Grampound; Replaced by Sir Orlando Bridgeman 1724	
Lostwithiel (seat 2/2)	Lord Stanhope - took office Replaced by Henry Parsons 1724 - took office Replaced by Sir William Stanhope 1727	
Ludgershall (seat 1/2)	John Richmond Webb - died Replaced by Anthony Cornish 1724	
Ludgershall (seat 2/2)	Borlase Richmond Webb	
Ludlow (seat 1/2)	Abel Ketelby	
Ludlow (seat 2/2)	Acton Baldwyn - died Replaced by Richard Herbert 1727	
Lyme Regis (seat 1/2)	Henry Holt Henley	
Lyme Regis (seat 2/2)	John Burridge	
Lymington (seat 1/2)	Lord Harry Powlett -sat for Hampshire; Replaced by Sir Gilbert Heathcote 1722	
Lymington (seat 2/2)	Paul Burrard, junior	Whig
== M ==
Maidstone (seat 1/2)	Sir Thomas Culpeper - died Replaced by Sir Barnham Rider 1723	
Maidstone (seat 2/2)	John Finch	
Maldon (seat 1/2)	John Comyns - took office Replaced by Henry Parsons 1727	
Maldon (seat 2/2)	Thomas Bramston	Whig
Malmesbury (seat 1/2)	Giles Earle	
Malmesbury (seat 2/2)	John Fermor - died Replaced by Charles Stewart 1723	
Malton (seat 1/2)	Sir William Strickland - died Replaced by Henry Finch 1724	Whig.
Malton (seat 2/2)	Thomas Watson-Wentworth II	
Marlborough (seat 1/2)	Earl of Hertford -sat for Northumberland; Replaced by Thomas Gibson 1722	
Marlborough (seat 2/2)	Gabriel Roberts	
Marlow	see Great Marlow	...
Melcombe Regis	see Weymouth and Melcombe Regis	...
Merionethshire (seat 1/1)	Richard Vaughan	
Middlesex (seat 1/2)	Hon. James Bertie	
Middlesex (seat 2/2)	John Austen	
Midhurst (seat 1/2)	Bulstrode Knight	
Midhurst (seat 2/2)	The Lord Midleton	
Milborne Port (seat 1/2)	Michael Harvey	
Milborne Port (seat 2/2)	George Speke	
Minehead (seat 1/2)	Thomas Hales	
Minehead (seat 2/2)	Robert Mansel - died Replaced by Francis Whitworth 1723	
Mitchell (seat 1/2)	Charles Selwyn	
Mitchell (seat 2/2)	John Hedges	
Monmouth Boroughs (seat 1/1)	Edward Kemeys	
Monmouthshire (seat 1/2)	William Morgan	
Monmouthshire (seat 2/2)	John Hanbury	
Montgomery (seat 1/1)	John Pugh	
Montgomeryshire (seat 1/1)	Price Devereux	
Morpeth (seat 1/2)	Viscount Morpeth	
Morpeth (seat 2/2)	George Carpenter	
Much Wenlock (seat 1/2)	see Wenlock	...
== N ==
Nairnshire (seat 1/1)	John Forbes	
Newark (seat 1/2)	Richard Sutton	
Newark (seat 2/2)	James Pelham	
Newcastle-under-Lyme (seat 1/2)	Sir Brian Broughton - died Replaced by Sir Walter Bagot, 5th Baronet 1724	
Newcastle-under-Lyme (seat 2/2)	Thomas Leveson-Gower	
Newcastle-upon-Tyne (seat 1/2)	Sir William Blackett, Bt.	
Newcastle-upon-Tyne (seat 2/2)	William Carr	
Newport (Cornwall) (seat 1/2)	Sir Nicholas Morice - died Replaced by Thomas Herbert 1726	
Newport (Cornwall) (seat 2/2)	Sir William Pole -sat for Honiton; Replaced by John Morice 1722	
Newport (Isle of Wight) (seat 1/2)	Earl of March - sat for Chichester; Replaced by Charles Cadogan 1722- succeeded to a peerage Replaced by Sir William Willys 1727	
Newport (Isle of Wight) (seat 2/2)	The Lord Whitworth - died Replaced by George Huxley 1726	
New Radnor Boroughs (seat 1/1)	Thomas Lewis	Whig
New Romney (seat 1/2)	Robert Furnese	Whig
New Romney (seat 2/2)	David Papillon	
New Shoreham (seat 1/2)	Francis Chamberlayne	
New Shoreham (seat 2/2)	Nathaniel Gould	
Newton (Lancashire) (seat 2/2)	Sir Francis Leicester	
Newton (Lancashire) (seat 1/2)	William Shippen	
Newtown (Isle of Wight) (seat 1/2)	William Stephens	
Newtown (Isle of Wight) (seat 2/2)	Charles Worsley	
New Windsor (seat 1/2)	Earl of Burford - succeeded to a peerage Replaced by Lord Vere Beauclerk 1726	
New Windsor (seat 2/2)	William, Earl of Inchiquin	
New Woodstock (seat 2/2)	Samuel Trotman	
New Woodstock (seat 1/2)	Sir Thomas Wheate	
Norfolk (seat 1/2)	Thomas de Grey	Whig
Norfolk (seat 2/2)	Sir Thomas Coke	Whig
Northallerton (seat 1/2)	Leonard Smelt	
Northallerton (seat 2/2)	Henry Peirse	
Northampton (seat 1/2)	William Wilmer	
Northampton (seat 2/2)	Edward Montagu	
Northamptonshire (seat 1/2)	Sir Justinian Isham	Tory
Northamptonshire (seat 2/2)	Thomas Cartwright	Tory
Northumberland (seat 1/2)	Sir William Middleton, Bt	
Northumberland (seat 2/2)	Earl of Hertford - ennobled Replaced by William Wrightson 1723 - unseated on petition Replaced by Ralph Jenison 1724	
Norwich (seat 1/2)	Waller Bacon	
Norwich (seat 2/2)	Robert Brightiffe	
Nottingham (seat 1/2)	John Plumptre	
Nottingham (seat 2/2)	George Gregory	
Nottinghamshire (seat 1/2)	The Viscount Howe	
Nottinghamshire (seat 2/2)	Sir Robert Sutton	
== O ==
Okehampton (seat 1/2)	Robert Pitt	
Okehampton (seat 2/2)	John Crowley	
Old Sarum (seat 1/2)	Thomas Pitt - died Replaced by George Pitt 1726	. Whig
Old Sarum (seat 2/2)	Robert Pitt -sat for Okehampton; Replaced by George Morton Pitt 1722 -took office Replaced by John Pitt 1724	
Orford (seat 1/2)	Dudley North	
Orford (seat 2/2)	William Acton	
Orkney and Shetland (seat 1/1)	George Douglas	
Oxford (seat 1/2)	Thomas Rowney, junior	
Oxford (seat 2/2)	Sir John Walter - died Replaced by Francis Knollys 1722	
Oxfordshire (seat 1/2)	Sir Banks Jenkinson	
Oxfordshire (seat 2/2)	Henry Perrot	
Oxford University (seat 1/2)	George Clarke	Tory
Oxford University (seat 2/2)	Wiliam Bromley	Tory
== P ==
Peeblesshire (seat 1/1)	John Douglas	
Pembroke Boroughs (seat 1/1)	Thomas Ferrers - died Replaced by William Owen 1722	Whig.
Pembrokeshire (seat 1/1)	Sir Arthur Owen, Bt	
Penryn (seat 1/2)	Sidney Meadows	
Penryn (seat 2/2)	Edward Vernon	
Perth Burghs (seat 1/1)	William Erskine	
Perthshire (seat 1/1)	Lord James Murray -ennobled Replaced by David Graeme 1724 - died Replaced by Mungo Haldane 1726	
Peterborough (seat 1/2)	Viscount Milton	Whig
Peterborough (seat 2/2)	Hon. Sidney Wortley-Montagu	Tory
Petersfield (seat 1/2)	Norton Powlett	
Petersfield (seat 2/2)	Edmund Miller - took office Replaced by Joseph Taylor 1727- unseated on petition Replaced Edmund Miller 1727	
Plymouth (seat 1/2)	William Chetwynd	
Plymouth (seat 2/2)	Pattee Byng	
Plympton Erle (seat 1/2)	Richard Edgcumbe	Whig
Plympton Erle (seat 2/2)	George Treby	
Pontefract (seat 1/2)	Sir William Lowther, 1st Baronet	
Pontefract (seat 2/2)	John Lowther	
Poole (seat 1/2)	George Trenchard	
Poole (seat 2/2)	Thomas Ridge	
Portsmouth (seat 1/2)	Sir Charles Wager	
Portsmouth (seat 2/2)	Sir John Norris	
Preston (seat 1/2)	Daniel Pulteney	
Preston (seat 2/2)	Thomas Hesketh	
== Q ==
Queenborough (seat 1/2)	James Littleton - died Replaced by Viscount Forbes 1723	
Queenborough (seat 2/2)	Lieutenant Colonel John Cope	
== R ==
Radnor Boroughs	see New Radnor Boroughs	...
Radnorshire (seat 1/1)	Sir Humphrey Howorth	
Reading (seat 1/2)	Anthony Blagrave	
Reading (seat 2/2)	Clement Kent	
Reigate (seat 1/2)	James Cocks	
Reigate (seat 2/2)	Sir Joseph Jekyll	
Renfrewshire (seat 1/1)	Thomas Cochrane	
Richmond (Yorkshire) (seat 1/2)	John Yorke	
Richmond (Yorkshire) (seat 2/2)	Conyers Darcy	
Ripon (seat 1/2)	William Aislabie II	Tory
Ripon (seat 2/2)	John Scrope	
Rochester (seat 1/2)	Sir Thomas Palmer - died Replaced by Sir Thomas Colby 1724	
Rochester (seat 2/2)	Sir John Jennings	
Ross-shire (seat 1/1)	Alexander Urquhart	
Roxburghshire (seat 1/1)	Sir Gilbert Elliot	
Rutland (seat 1/2)	Lord Finch	
Rutland (seat 2/2)	Sir Thomas Mackworth	
Rye (seat 1/2)	Phillips Gybbon	
Rye (seat 2/2)	The Lord Aylmer	Whig
== S ==
St Albans (seat 1/2)	William Gore	
St Albans (seat 2/2)	William Clayton	
St Germans (seat 1/2)	Lord Binning	
St Germans (seat 2/2)	Philip Cavendish	
St Ives (seat 1/2)	Henry Knollys	
St Ives (seat 2/2)	Sir John Hobart	
St Mawes (seat 1/2)	Sidney Godolphin	
St Mawes (seat 2/2)	Samuel Travers - died Replaced by Samuel Molyneux 1726	
Salisbury (seat 1/2)	Anthony Duncombe	
Salisbury (seat 2/2)	Francis Kenton	
Saltash (seat 1/2)	Thomas Swanton - died Replaced by Philip Lloyd 1723	
Saltash (seat 2/2)	Edward Hughes	
Sandwich (seat 1/2)	Josiah Burchett	Whig
Sandwich (seat 2/2)	Sir George Oxenden	Whig
Scarborough (seat 1/2)	John Hungerford	Tory
Scarborough (seat 2/2)	Sir William Strickland	Whig
Seaford (seat 1/2)	Sir William Gage, Bt	
Seaford (seat 2/2)	Sir Philip Yorke	
Selkirkshire (seat 1/1)	John Pringle	
Shaftesbury (seat 1/2)	Sir Edward des Bouverie	
Shaftesbury (seat 2/2)	Edward Nicholas - died Replaced by Stephen Fox 1726	
Shrewsbury (seat 1/2)	Richard Lyster – unseated on petition Replaced by Sir Richard Corbet 1723	
Shrewsbury (seat 2/2)	Corbet Kynaston – unseated on petition Replaced by Orlando Bridgeman 1723	
Shropshire (seat 1/2)	John Kynaston	
Shropshire (seat 2/2)	Robert Lloyd	
Shoreham	see New Shoreham	...
Somerset (seat 1/2)	Edward Phelips	
Somerset (seat 2/2)	Sir William Wyndham, Bt	Tory
Southampton (seat 1/2)	Thomas Lewis	
Southampton (seat 2/2)	Thomas Missing	
Southwark (seat 1/2)	George Meggott - died Replaced by John Lade 1724	
Southwark (seat 2/2)	Edmund Halsey	
Stafford (seat 1/2)	Thomas Foley	
Stafford (seat 2/2)	John Dolphin - died Replaced by Francis Elde 1724- expelled Replaced by The Viscount Chetwynd 1725	
Staffordshire (seat 1/2)	Lord Paget	Tory
Staffordshire (seat 2/2)	William Leveson Gower	
Stamford (seat 1/2)	Brownlow Cecil - succeeded to a peerage Replaced by William Noel 1722	
Stamford (seat 2/2)	Hon. Charles Bertie	
Steyning (seat 1/2)	John Pepper - died Replaced by Marquess of Carnarvon 1726 - died Replaced by William Stanhope 1727	
Steyning (seat 2/2)	John Gumley	
Stirling Burghs (seat 1/1)	Henry Cunningham	
Stirlingshire (seat 1/1)	John Graham	
Stockbridge (seat 1/2)	John Chetwynd	
Stockbridge (seat 2/2)	Martin Bladen	
Sudbury (seat 1/2)	John Knight	
Sudbury (seat 2/2)	William Windham	
Suffolk (seat 1/2)	Sir Thomas Hanmer, Bt	
Suffolk (seat 2/2)	Sir Robert Davers - died Replaced by Sir William Barker 1722	
Surrey (seat 1/2)	John Walter	
Surrey (seat 2/2)	Sir Nicholas Carew - died Replaced by Thomas Scawen 1727	
Sussex (seat 1/2)	Henry Pelham	
Sussex (seat 2/2)	Hon. Spencer Compton	Whig
Sutherland (seat 1/1)	Sir William Gordon	
== T ==
Tain Burghs (seat 1/1)	Sir Robert Munro, Bt	
Tamworth (seat 1/2)	Samuel Bracebridge – unseated on petition Replaced by Richard Swinfen 1723 - died Replaced by George Compton 1727	
Tamworth (seat 2/2)	Francis Willoughby	
Taunton (seat 1/2)	John Trenchard - died Replaced by Abraham Elton 1724	Whig; Whig
Taunton (seat 2/2)	James Smith	Whig
Tavistock (seat 1/2)	Sir John Cope	
Tavistock (seat 2/2)	Sir Francis Henry Drake, Bt	
Tewkesbury (seat 1/2)	The Viscount Gage	
Tewkesbury (seat 2/2)	Brigadier George Reade	
Thetford (seat 1/2)	Sir Edmund Bacon	
Thetford (seat 2/2)	Robert Jacomb	
Thirsk (seat 2/2)	William St Quintin	
Thirsk (seat 1/2)	Thomas Frankland	
Tiverton (seat 1/2)	Arthur Arscott	
Tiverton (seat 2/2)	Thomas Bere - died Replaced by George Deane 1726	
Totnes (seat 2/2)	Joseph Banks	
Totnes (seat 1/2)	Charles Wills	
Tregony (seat 1/2)	James Cooke	
Tregony (seat 2/2)	John Merrill	
Truro (seat 1/2)	Thomas Wyndham	
Truro (seat 2/2)	Spencer Cowper	
== W ==
Wallingford (seat 1/2)	Viscount Parker	
Wallingford (seat 2/2)	William Hucks	
Wareham (seat 1/2)	Sir Edward Ernle	
Wareham (seat 2/2)	Joseph Gascoigne	
Warwick (seat 1/2)	William Colemore - died Replaced by Sir William Keyt 1722	
Warwick (seat 2/2)	Hon. Dodington Greville	
Warwickshire (seat 1/2)	William Peyto	
Warwickshire (seat 2/2)	Robert Digby - died Replaced by Edward Digby 1726	
Wells (seat 1/2)	Thomas Edwards	
Wells (seat 2/2)	Francis Gwyn	
Wendover (seat 1/2)	Richard Hampden	
Wendover (seat 2/2)	Sir Richard Steele	Whig
Wenlock (seat 2/2)	Sir Humphrey Briggs	
Wenlock (seat 1/2)	Samuel Edwards	
Weobley (seat 1/2)	John Birch	
Weobley (seat 2/2)	Nicholas Philpott	
West Looe (seat 1/2)	George Delaval - died Replaced by Edward Trelawny 1724	
West Looe (seat 2/2)	Sir John Trelawny	
Westbury (seat 1/2)	James Bertie – sat for Middlesex; Replaced by Willoughby Bertie – unseated on petition Replaced by Lord Carbery	
Westbury (seat 2/2)	Francis Annesley	
Westminster (seat 1/2)	Archibald Hutcheson - election void Replaced by Charles Montagu 1722	
Westminster (seat 2/2)	John Cotton - election void Replaced by The Lord Carpenter 1722	
Westmorland (seat 1/2)	Anthony Lowther	
Westmorland (seat 2/2)	James Grahme	
Weymouth and Melcombe Regis (seat 1/4)	Sir James Thornhill	
Weymouth and Melcombe Regis (seat 2/4)	Thomas Pearse - took office Replaced by Edward Tucker 1727	
Weymouth and Melcombe Regis (seat 3/4)	John Ward	
Weymouth and Melcombe Regis (seat 4/4)	William Betts	
Whitchurch (seat 2/2)	Thomas Vernon - died Replaced by Thomas Farrington 1727	
Whitchurch (seat 1/2)	John Conduitt	
Wigan (seat 1/2)	Sir Roger Bradshaigh	
Wigan (seat 2/2)	James Barry	
Wigtown Burghs (seat 1/1)	William Dalrymple	
Wigtownshire (seat 1/1)	John Stewart	
Wilton (seat 1/2)	Robert Sawyer Herbert	
Wilton (seat 2/2)	Thomas Pitt	
Wiltshire (seat 1/2)	Sir Richard Howe	
Wiltshire (seat 2/2)	Robert Hyde - died Replaced by Richard Goddard 1722	
Winchelsea (seat 1/2)	Robert Bristow II	
Winchelsea (seat 2/2)	George Bubb Dodington -sat for Bridgwater; Replaced by Thomas Townshend 1722	
Winchester (seat 1/2)	George Brydges	
Winchester (seat 2/2)	Lord William Powlett	
Windsor	see New Windsor	...
Woodstock	see New Woodstock	...
Wootton Bassett (seat 1/2)	Colonel Robert Murray	
Wootton Bassett (seat 2/2)	William Chetwynd	
Worcester (seat 1/2)	Thomas Wylde	
Worcester (seat 2/2)	Samuel Sandys	
Worcestershire (seat 1/2)	Sir John Pakington	Tory
Worcestershire (seat 2/2)	Sir Thomas Lyttelton	
Wycombe	see Chipping Wycombe	...
== Y ==
Yarmouth (Isle of Wight) (seat 1/2)	Anthony Morgan	
Yarmouth (Isle of Wight) (seat 2/2)	Thomas Stanwix - died Replaced by Maurice Morgan 1725	
Yarmouth (Norfolk)	see Great Yarmouth	...
York (seat 1/2)	Sir William Milner, 1st Baronet	
York (seat 2/2)	Edward Thompson	
Yorkshire (seat 1/2)	The 2nd Viscount Downe	
Yorkshire (seat 2/2)	Sir Arthur Kaye - died Replaced by Cholmley Turner 1727	

== By-elections ==
- List of Great Britain by-elections (1715–34)

== See also ==
- 1722 British general election
- List of parliaments of Great Britain
- Unreformed House of Commons
