= List of MPs elected in the 1715 British general election =

1715–1722 Parliament of Great Britain
←	1713–1715 Parliament	1722–1727 Parliament	→

Overview
- Legislative body: Parliament of Great Britain
- Meeting place: Palace of Westminster
- Term: 17 March 1715 – 10 March 1722
- Election: 1715 British general election
- Government: Walpole–Townshend ministry (from February 1721); Second Stanhope–Sunderland ministry (1718–February 1721); First Stanhope–Sunderland ministry (1717–1718); Townshend ministry (until 1717)

House of Commons
- Members: 558
- Speaker: Spencer Compton
- Chief minister: Charles Spencer, 3rd Earl of Sunderland (21 March 1718–4 April 1721) James Stanhope, 1st Earl Stanhope (12 April 1717–21 March 1718); Charles Townshend, 2nd Viscount Townshend (until 1716)
- Prime Minister: Robert Walpole (from 4 April 1721)
- Leader: Robert Walpole (from 4 April 1721)

House of Lords
- Lord Chancellor: Baron Parker (from 12 May 1718); In commission (18 April 1718–12 May 1718); Baron Cowper (until 15 April 1718)
- Leader: Viscount Townshend (from February 1721); Earl Stanhope (March 1718–5 February 1721); Earl of Sunderland (until March 1718)

Crown-in-Parliament George I

Sessions
- 1st: 17 March 1715 – 26 June 1716
- 2nd: 20 February 1717 – 15 July 1717
- 3rd: 21 November 1717 – 21 March 1718
- 4th: 11 November 1718 – 18 April 1719
- 5th: 23 November 1719 – 11 June 1720
- 6th: 8 December 1720 – 29 July 1721
- 7th: 31 July 1721 – 10 August 1721
- 8th: 19 October 1721 – 7 March 1722

This is a list of the 558 MPs or members of Parliament elected to the 314 constituencies of the Parliament of Great Britain in 1715, the 5th Parliament of Great Britain and their replacements returned at subsequent by-elections, arranged by constituency.

Elections took place between 22 January 1715 and 9 March 1715.

Table of contents:

A B C D E F G H I J K L M N O P Q R S T U V W X Y Z By-elections Changes

== A ==
Aberdeen Burghs (seat 1/1)	James Erskine – unseated on petition Replaced by John Middleton 1715	. Whig
Aberdeenshire (seat 1/1)	Sir Alexander Cumming	Tory
Abingdon (seat 1/1)	James Jennings	Tory
Aldborough (seat 1/2)	James Stanhope - sat for Cockermouth; Replaced by William Monson 1715	
Aldborough (seat 2/2)	William Jessop	Whig
Aldeburgh (seat 1/2)	Sir Henry Johnson - died Replaced by Walter Plumer 1719	Tory; Whig
Aldeburgh (seat 2/2)	William Johnson - died Replaced by Samuel Lowe 1718	Tory.
Amersham (seat 1/2)	Montague Garrard Drake	Tory
Amersham (seat 2/2)	The Viscount Fermanagh - died Replaced by The Viscount Fermanagh 1717	Tory.
Andover (seat 1/2)	John Wallop - sat for Hampshire; Replaced by James Brudenell 1715	. Whig
Andover (seat 2/2)	William Guidott	Whig
Anglesey (seat 1/1)	Owen Meyrick	Whig
Anstruther Easter Burghs (seat 1/1)	Philip Anstruther	Whig
Appleby (seat 1/2)	Thomas Lutwyche	Tory
Appleby (seat 2/2)	Sir Richard Sandford, Bt.	Whig
Argyllshire (seat 1/1)	Sir James Campbell	
Arundel (seat 1/2)	General Henry Lumley	
Arundel (seat 2/2)	Thomas Micklethwaite - died Replaced by Joseph Micklethwaite 1718	
Ashburton (seat 1/2)	Richard Reynell	Tory
Ashburton (seat 2/2)	Roger Tuckfield	Whig
Aylesbury (seat 1/2)	Nathaniel Meade	
Aylesbury (seat 2/2)	John Deacle - sat for Evesham; Replaced by Trevor Hill 1715	. Whig
Ayr Burghs (seat 1/1)	Charles Oliphant - died Replaced by Thomas Kennedy 1720	
Ayrshire (seat 1/1)	John Montgomerie	
== B ==
Banbury (seat 1/1)	Sir Jonathan Cope	
Banffshire (seat 1/1)	Alexander Abercromby	
Barnstaple (seat 1/2)	John Rolle	
Barnstaple (seat 2/2)	Sir Arthur Chichester- died Replaced by John Basset 1718 - died Replaced by Sir Hugh Acland 1721	
Bath (seat 1/2)	Samuel Trotman - died Replaced by Robert Gay 1720	
Bath (seat 2/2)	John Codrington	
Beaumaris (seat 1/1)	Hon. Henry Bertie	
Bedford (seat 1/2)	William Farrer	Whig
Bedford (seat 2/2)	John Thurlow Brace	Whig
Bedfordshire (seat 1/2)	William Hillersden	Whig
Bedfordshire (seat 2/2)	John Harvey – unseated on petition Replaced by John Cater	Tory
Bere Alston (seat 1/2)	Lawrence Carter	
Bere Alston (seat 2/2)	Horatio Walpole – took office Replaced by Edward Carteret 1717 - took office Replaced by Philip Cavendish 1721 - unseated on petition Replaced by St John Brodrick 1721	
Berkshire (seat 1/2)	Sir John Stonhouse, Bt	
Berkshire (seat 2/2)	Robert Packer	
Berwickshire (seat 1/1)	George Baillie	
Berwick-upon-Tweed (seat 1/2)	Grey Neville	Whig
Berwick-upon-Tweed (seat 2/2)	John Barrington	
Beverley (seat 1/2)	Sir Charles Hotham, Bt	Whig
Beverley (seat 2/2)	Sir Michael Warton	
Bewdley (seat 1/1)	Grey James Grove	Whig
Bishop's Castle (seat 1/2)	Richard Harnage - died Replaced by Sir Matthew Decker 1719	
Bishop's Castle (seat 2/2)	Charles Mason	
Bletchingley (seat 1/2)	George Evelyn	
Bletchingley (seat 2/2)	Thomas Onslow – took office Replaced by William Clayton 1715	
Bodmin (seat 1/2)	Hon. Francis Robartes - died Replaced by Earl of Burford 1718	
Bodmin (seat 2/2)	John Legh	
Boroughbridge (seat 1/2)	Thomas Wilkinson – took office Replaced by Sir Wilfrid Lawson 1718	
Boroughbridge (seat 2/2)	Richard Steele	Whig
Bossiney (seat 1/2)	Henry Cartwright	
Bossiney (seat 2/2)	Samuel Molyneux	
Boston (seat 1/2)	Henry Heron	
Boston (seat 2/2)	Richard Wynn - died Replaced by Richard Ellys 1720	
Brackley (seat 1/2)	Hon. William Egerton	
Brackley (seat 2/2)	Paul Methuen	
Bramber (seat 1/2)	Sir Richard Gough	
Bramber (seat 2/2)	Sir Thomas Style – unseated on petition Replaced by Edward Minshull	
Brecon (seat 1/1)	Roger Jones	
Breconshire (seat 1/1)	Sir Edward Williams - died Replaced by William Gwyn Vaughan 1721	
Bridgnorth (seat 1/2)	William Whitmore	
Bridgnorth (seat 2/2)	John Weaver	
Bridgwater (seat 1/2)	George Dodington - died Replaced by William Pitt 1720	Whig.
Bridgwater (seat 2/2)	Thomas Palmer	Tory
Bridport (seat 1/2)	John Strangways – unseated on petition Replaced by Peter Walter 1715	
Bridport (seat 2/2)	William Coventry - succeeded peerage Replaced by Dewey Bulkeley 1719	
Bristol (seat 1/2)	Sir William Daines	
Bristol (seat 2/2)	Joseph Earle	
Buckingham (seat 1/2)	Alexander Denton	
Buckingham (seat 2/2)	Abraham Stanyan – took office Replaced by Edmund Halsey 1717	
Buckinghamshire (seat 1/2)	John Fleetwood	
Buckinghamshire (seat 2/2)	Richard Hampden	
Bury St Edmunds (seat 1/2)	Aubrey Porter - died Replaced by James Reynolds 1717	
Bury St Edmunds (seat 2/2)	Lord Hervey	
Buteshire (seat 0/0)	Alternating seat with Caithness - unrepresented in this Parliament	
== C ==
Caernarvon Boroughs (seat 1/1)	Sir Thomas Wynn, Bt	
Caernarvonshire (seat 1/1)	William Griffith - died Replaced by John Griffith 1715	
Caithness (seat 1/1)	Sir Robert Gordon, 4th Baronet	
Callington (seat 1/2)	Samuel Rolle - died Replaced by Thomas Coplestone 1719	
Callington (seat 2/2)	Sir John Coryton	
Calne (seat 1/2)	Sir Orlando Bridgeman, Bt	
Calne (seat 2/2)	Richard Chiswell	
Cambridge (seat 1/2)	John Hynde Cotton	Tory
Cambridge (seat 2/2)	Thomas Sclater; Replaced by Samuel Shepheard 1715	Tory.
Cambridgeshire (seat 1/2)	John Bromley - died Replaced by Francis Whichcote 1718	
Cambridgeshire (seat 2/2)	John Jenyns - died Replaced by Robert Clarke 1717	
Cambridge University (seat 1/2)	Hon. Dixie Windsor	
Cambridge University (seat 2/2)	Thomas Paske - died Replaced by Thomas Willoughby 1720	
Camelford (seat 1/2)	James Montagu	
Camelford (seat 2/2)	Richard Coffin	
Canterbury (seat 1/2)	John Hardres	
Canterbury (seat 2/2)	Sir Thomas Hales, Bt	
Cardiff Boroughs (seat 1/1)	Sir Edward Stradling, Bt	
Cardigan Boroughs (seat 1/1)	Stephen Parry	
Cardiganshire (seat 1/1)	Lewis Pryse Expelled for refusing to take loyalty oaths Replaced by Owen Brigstocke 1717	
Carlisle (seat 1/2)	William Strickland	Whig
Carlisle (seat 2/2)	Thomas Stanwix – took office Replaced by Henry Aglionby, 1721	
Carmarthen (seat 1/1)	Richard Vaughan	
Carmarthenshire (seat 1/1)	Marquess of Winchester - ennobled Replaced by Sir Thomas Stepney 1717	
Castle Rising (seat 1/2)	Hon. William Feilding	
Castle Rising (seat 2/2)	Charles Churchill	
Cheshire (seat 1/2)	Sir George Warburton, Bt	
Cheshire (seat 2/2)	Langham Booth	Whig
Chester (seat 1/2)	Sir Henry Bunbury, Bt	
Chester (seat 2/2)	Sir Richard Grosvenor, Bt	
Chichester (seat 1/2)	Sir Richard Farington - died Replaced by Henry Kelsall 1719	
Chichester (seat 2/2)	Thomas Miller	
Chippenham (seat 1/2)	Sir John Eyles	
Chippenham (seat 2/2)	Giles Earle	
Chipping Wycombe (seat 1/2)	Sir Thomas Lee, Bt	
Chipping Wycombe (seat 2/2)	Sir John Wittewronge, Bt - died Replaced by John Neale 1722	
Christchurch (seat 1/2)	Peter Mews	
Christchurch (seat 2/2)	William Ettrick - died Replaced by Francis Gwyn 1717	
Cirencester (seat 1/2)	Thomas Master	Tory
Cirencester (seat 2/2)	Benjamin Bathurst	Tory
City of Durham	see Durham (City of)	...
City of London	see London (City of)	...
Clackmannanshire (seat 0/0)	Alternating seat with Kinross-shire - unrepresented in this Parliament	
Clitheroe (seat 1/2)	Thomas Lister	
Clitheroe (seat 2/2)	Edward Harvey	
Clyde Burghs	see Glasgow Burghs	...
Cockermouth (seat 1/2)	Nicholas Lechmere - took office Replaced by double return of Lord Percy Seymour and Wilfrid Lawson 1717; Lord Percy Seymour declared elected 1718 - died Replaced by Anthony Lowther 1721	
Cockermouth (seat 2/2)	James Stanhope; Replaced by Thomas Pengelly 1717	
Colchester (seat 1/2)	Richard Du Cane	Whig
Colchester (seat 2/2)	Sir Isaac Rebow	Whig
Corfe Castle (seat 1/2)	Denis Bond	
Corfe Castle (seat 2/2)	William Okeden - died Replaced by Double Return Joshua Churchill and John Bankes 1718; Joshua Churchill declared elected 1719- died Replaced by John Bond 1721	
Cornwall (seat 1/2)	Sir William Carew, Bt	
Cornwall (seat 2/2)	John Trevanion	
County Durham	see Durham (County)	...
Coventry (seat 1/2)	(Sir) Adolphus Oughton	
Coventry (seat 2/2)	Sir Thomas Samwell, Bt	
Cricklade (seat 1/2)	Sir Thomas Reade	
Cricklade (seat 2/2)	Jacob Sawbridge - expelled (Director of the South Sea Company); Replaced by Matthew Ducie Moreton 1721	
Cromartyshire (seat 1/1)	Alexander Urquhart	
Cumberland (seat 1/2)	James Lowther	
Cumberland (seat 2/2)	Gilfrid Lawson	
== D ==
Dartmouth (seat 1/2)	Joseph Herne	
Dartmouth (seat 2/2)	John Fownes	
Denbigh Boroughs (seat 1/1)	John Roberts	
Denbighshire (seat 1/1)	Sir Richard Myddelton, Bt - died Replaced by Watkin Williams 1716	Tory
Derby (seat 1/2)	Lord James Cavendish	
Derby (seat 2/2)	William Stanhope	Whig
Derbyshire (seat 1/2)	Godfrey Clarke	
Derbyshire (seat 2/2)	John Curzon	
Devizes (seat 1/2)	Josiah Diston	
Devizes (seat 2/2)	Francis Eyles - expelled (Director of the South Sea Company); Replaced by Benjamin Haskins Stiles 1721	
Devon (seat 1/2)	Sir William Courtenay	
Devon (seat 2/2)	Sir Coplestone Bampfylde, Bt	
Dorchester (seat 1/2)	Nathaniel Napier	
Dorchester (seat 2/2)	Henry Trenchard - died Replaced by Robert Browne 1720 – unseated on petition Replaced by Abraham Janssen 1720	
Dorset (seat 1/2)	George Chafin	
Dorset (seat 2/2)	Thomas Strangways	
Dover (seat 1/2)	Matthew Aylmer - died Replaced by George Berkeley 1720	
Dover (seat 2/2)	Philip Papillon - took office Replaced by Henry Furnese 1720	
Downton (seat 1/2)	Charles Longueville	
Downton (seat 2/2)	John Eyre - died Replaced by Giles Eyre 1715	
Droitwich (seat 1/2)	Richard Foley	
Droitwich (seat 2/2)	Edward Jeffreys	
Dumfries Burghs (seat 1/1)	Alexander Fergusson	
Dumfriesshire (seat 1/1)	Sir William Johnstone, Bt	
Dunbartonshire (seat 1/1)	Hon. John Campbell	
Dunwich (seat 1/2)	Sir Robert Rich, Bt	
Dunwich (seat 2/2)	Charles Long	
Durham (City of) (seat 1/2)	Thomas Conyers	
Durham (City of) (seat 2/2)	George Baker	
Durham (County) (seat 1/2)	Sir John Eden	Tory
Durham (County) (seat 2/2)	John Hedworth	Independent Whig
Dysart Burghs (seat 1/1)	William Kerr	
== E ==
East Grinstead (seat 1/2)	John Conyers	
East Grinstead (seat 2/2)	Hon. Spencer Compton - sat for Sussex; Replaced by The Viscount Shannon 1715	
East Looe (seat 1/2)	John Smith	Whig
East Looe (seat 2/2)	Sir James Bateman - died Replaced by Horatio Walpole 1718	
East Retford (seat 1/2)	Thomas White	
East Retford (seat 2/2)	John Digby	
Edinburgh (seat 1/1)	Sir George Warrender - died Replaced by John Campbell 1721	
Edinburghshire (seat 1/1)	John Baird	
Elgin Burghs (seat 1/1)	John Campbell, later Duke of Argyll	
Elginshire (seat 1/1)	Alexander Grant - died Replaced by James Brodie 1720 - died Replaced by Alexander Brodie 1720	
Essex (seat 1/2)	Thomas Middleton - died Replaced by William Harvey 1715 - unseated on petition Replaced by Robert Honywood 1716	
Essex (seat 2/2)	Richard Child	
Evesham (seat 1/2)	John Deacle	
Evesham (seat 2/2)	John Rudge	
Exeter (seat 1/2)	John Bampfylde	
Exeter (seat 2/2)	Francis Drewe	
Eye (seat 1/2)	Edward Hopkins	
Eye (seat 2/2)	Thomas Smith	
== F ==
Fife (seat 1/1)	Sir John Anstruther	
Flint Boroughs (seat 1/1)	Sir John Conway - died Replaced by Thomas Eyton 1721	
Flintshire (seat 1/1)	Sir Roger Mostyn	
Forfarshire (seat 1/1)	John Carnegie - expelled for supporting the Jacobite Rising; Replaced by James Scott 1716	
Fowey (seat 1/2)	Jonathan Elford	
Fowey (seat 2/2)	Henry Vincent - died Replaced by Nicholas Vincent 1719	
== G ==
Gatton (seat 1/2)	William Newland	
Gatton (seat 2/2)	Paul Docminique	
Glamorganshire (seat 1/1)	Robert Jones - died Replaced by Sir Charles Kemeys 1716	
Glasgow Burghs (seat 1/1)	Thomas Smith - died Replaced by Daniel Campbell 1716	
Gloucester (seat 1/2)	John Snell	
Gloucester (seat 2/2)	Charles Coxe	
Gloucestershire (seat 1/2)	Thomas Stephens II - died Replaced by Henry Berkeley 1720	Whig.
Gloucestershire (seat 2/2)	Matthew Moreton - ennobled Replaced by Edmund Bray 1720	Tory
Grampound (seat 1/2)	Hon. John West	
Grampound (seat 2/2)	Charles Cooke - died Replaced by Richard West 1721	
Grantham (seat 1/2)	Edward Rolt	
Grantham (seat 2/2)	John Heathcote	
Great Bedwyn (seat 1/2)	Stephen Bisse	
Great Bedwyn (seat 2/2)	William Sloper	
Great Grimsby (seat 1/2)	Sir Robert Chaplin - expelled (Director of the South Sea Company); Replaced by Arthur Moore 1721	
Great Grimsby (seat 2/2)	Joseph Banks	
Great Marlow (seat 1/2)	The Lord Shelburne	
Great Marlow (seat 2/2)	George Bruere	.
Great Yarmouth (seat 1/2)	George England	
Great Yarmouth (seat 2/2)	Horatio Townshend	
Guildford (seat 1/2)	Denzil Onslow; Replaced by Robert Wroth 1717 - died Replaced by Arthur Onslow 1720	Whig. Whig
Guildford (seat 2/2)	Morgan Randyll	Whig
== H ==
Haddington Burghs (seat 1/1)	Hon. Sir David Dalrymple	
Haddingtonshire (seat 1/1)	John Cockburn	
Hampshire (seat 1/2)	John Wallop - ennobled Replaced by Lord Nassau Powlett 1720	
Hampshire (seat 2/2)	George Pitt	
Harwich (seat 1/2)	Sir Philip Parker-a-Morley-Long, Bt	
Harwich (seat 2/2)	Thomas Heath	
Haslemere (seat 1/2)	Nicholas Carew	
Haslemere (seat 2/2)	Sir Montague Blundell, Bt	
Hastings (seat 1/2)	Archibald Hutcheson	
Hastings (seat 2/2)	Henry Pelham	
Haverfordwest (seat 1/1)	John Laugharne - died Replaced by Sir George Barlow 1715 - result reversed on petition Replaced by John Barlow 1715- died Replaced by Sir John Philipps 1718	
Hedon (seat 1/2)	Hugh Cholmley – took office Replaced by Daniel Pulteney 1721	Whig
Hedon (seat 2/2)	William Pulteney	Whig
Helston (seat 1/2)	Sir Gilbert Heathcote, Bt	Whig
Helston (seat 2/2)	Sidney Godolphin	
Hereford (seat 1/2)	The Viscount Scudamore- died Replaced by Herbert Rudhale Westfaling 1717	
Hereford (seat 2/2)	Thomas Foley	
Herefordshire (seat 1/2)	Richard Hopton	
Herefordshire (seat 2/2)	Sir Thomas Morgan - died Replaced by Sir Hungerford Hoskyns 1717	Tory
Hertford (seat 1/2)	Sir Thomas Clarke	
Hertford (seat 2/2)	John Boteler	
Hertfordshire (seat 1/2)	Ralph Freman	
Hertfordshire (seat 2/2)	Sir Thomas Sebright, Bt	
Heytesbury (seat 1/2)	Edward Ashe	
Heytesbury (seat 2/2)	William Ashe	
Higham Ferrers (seat 1/1)	Charles Leigh	
Hindon (seat 1/2)	Reynolds Calthorpe, the younger - died Replaced by John Pitt 1720	
Hindon (seat 2/2)	Major-General George Wade	
Honiton (seat 1/2)	Sir William Courtenay - sat for Devon; Replaced by Sir William Pole 1716	
Honiton (seat 2/2)	Sir William Yonge	
Horsham (seat 1/2)	Arthur Ingram – ennobled Replaced by Charles Eversfield 1721	
Horsham (seat 2/2)	Arthur Ingram	
Huntingdon (seat 1/2)	Sidney Wortley-Montagu	
Huntingdon (seat 2/2)	Viscount Hinchingbrooke	
Huntingdonshire (seat 1/2)	John Bigg	
Huntingdonshire (seat 2/2)	Robert Pigott	
Hythe (seat 1/2)	Jacob des Bouverie	
Hythe (seat 2/2)	Sir Samuel Lennard	
== I ==
Ilchester (seat 1/2)	William Bellamy	
Ilchester (seat 2/2)	John Hopkins	
Inverness Burghs (seat 1/1)	William Steuart	
Inverness-shire (seat 1/1)	John Forbes	
Ipswich (seat 1/2)	William Churchill – took office Replaced by Francis Negus 1717	
Ipswich (seat 2/2)	William Thompson	
== K ==
Kent (seat 1/2)	Mildmay Fane - died Replaced by John Fane 1715	
Kent (seat 2/2)	William Delaune	
Kincardineshire (seat 1/1)	James Scott	
King's Lynn (seat 1/2)	Sir Robert Walpole	Whig
King's Lynn (seat 2/2)	Sir Charles Turner	
Kingston upon Hull (seat 1/2)	Sir William St Quintin	Tory
Kingston upon Hull (seat 2/2)	William Maister - died Replaced by Nathaniel Rogers 1717	Tory
Kinross-shire (seat 1/1)	William Douglas	
Kirkcudbright Stewartry (seat 1/1)	Alexander Murray	
Knaresborough (seat 1/2)	The Earl Mountrath - died Replaced by Richard Arundell 1720	Whig.
Knaresborough (seat 2/2)	Robert Hitch	
== L ==
Lanarkshire (seat 1/1)	James Lockhart - died Replaced by Lord Archibald Hamilton 1718	
Lancashire (seat 1/2)	Sir John Bland	
Lancashire (seat 2/2)	Richard Shuttleworth	Tory
Lancaster (seat 1/2)	William Heysham - died Replaced by William Heysham, jnr 1716	
Lancaster (seat 2/2)	Dodding Bradyll	
Launceston (seat 1/2)	Edward Herle - died Replaced by Alexander Pendarves 1721	
Launceston (seat 2/2)	John Anstis	
Leicester (seat 1/2)	James Winstanley - died Replaced by Thomas Noble 1719	
Leicester (seat 2/2)	Sir George Beaumont	
Leicestershire (seat 1/2)	Geoffrey Palmer	
Leicestershire (seat 2/2)	Sir Thomas Cave - died Replaced by Lord William Manners 1719	Tory.
Leominster (seat 1/2)	The Lord Coningsby - ennobled Replaced by George Caswall 1717 - expelled Replaced by William Bateman 1721	
Leominster (seat 2/2)	Edward Harley	
Lewes (seat 1/2)	Thomas Pelham	
Lewes (seat 2/2)	John Morley Trevor - died Replaced by Philip Yorke 1719	
Lichfield (seat 1/2)	Walter Chetwynd - took office Replaced by William Sneyd 1718 - unseated on petition Replaced by Walter Chetwynd 1718	
Lichfield (seat 2/2)	Samuel Hill	
Lincoln (seat 1/2)	Sir John Tyrwhitt, Bt	
Lincoln (seat 2/2)	Richard Grantham	
Lincolnshire (seat 1/2)	Sir Willoughby Hickman, Bt. - died Replaced by Sir William Massingberd 1721	
Lincolnshire (seat 2/2)	John Brownlow	
Linlithgow Burghs (seat 1/1)	Hon. George Douglas	
Linlithgowshire (seat 1/1)	Sir James Cunynghame	
Liskeard (seat 1/2)	Philip Rashleigh	Tory
Liskeard (seat 2/2)	Sir John Trelawny	
Liverpool (seat 1/2)	Sir Thomas Johnson	Whig
Liverpool (seat 2/2)	Edward Norris	
London (City of) (seat 1/4)	Robert Heysham	Whig
London (City of) (seat 2/4)	Sir John Ward	Whig
London (City of) (seat 3/4)	Peter Godfrey	Tory
London (City of) (seat 4/4)	Sir Thomas Scawen	Whig
Lostwithiel (seat 1/2)	Thomas Liddell - died Replaced by Edward Eliot 1718 – took office Replaced by John Newsham 1720	
Lostwithiel (seat 2/2)	Galfridus Walpole – took office Replaced by Marquess of Hartington 1721	
Ludgershall (seat 1/2)	John Richmond Webb	Tory
Ludgershall (seat 2/2)	John Ivory-Talbot	
Ludlow (seat 1/2)	Humphrey Walcot	
Ludlow (seat 2/2)	Sir Robert Raymond	
Lyme Regis (seat 1/2)	John Henley	
Lyme Regis (seat 2/2)	John Burridge	
Lymington (seat 1/2)	Lord William Powlett - sat for Winchester; Replaced by Richard Chaundler 1715	
Lymington (seat 2/2)	Sir Joseph Jekyll	Whig
== M ==
Maidstone (seat 1/2)	Sir Thomas Culpeper	
Maidstone (seat 2/2)	Sir Robert Marsham - ennobled Replaced by Sir Barnham Rider 1716	
Maldon (seat 1/2)	Samuel Tufnell	
Maldon (seat 2/2)	Thomas Bramston	Whig
Malmesbury (seat 1/2)	Sir John Rushout	
Malmesbury (seat 2/2)	Joseph Addison - died Replaced by Fleetwood Dormer 1719	Whig.
Malton (seat 1/2)	Thomas Watson Wentworth	
Malton (seat 2/2)	Thomas Watson-Wentworth II	
Marlborough (seat 1/2)	Sir William Humphreys	
Marlborough (seat 2/2)	Joshua Ward – unseated on petition Replaced by Gabriel Roberts 1717	
Marlow	see Great Marlow	...
Melcombe Regis	see Weymouth and Melcombe Regis	...
Merionethshire (seat 1/1)	Richard Vaughan	
Middlesex (seat 1/2)	Hon. James Bertie	
Middlesex (seat 2/2)	Hugh Smithson	
Midhurst (seat 1/2)	William Woodward Knight - died Replaced by Sir Richard Mill 1721	
Midhurst (seat 2/2)	John Fortescue Aland – took office Replaced by The Lord Midleton 1717	
Milborne Port (seat 1/2)	John Cox - died Replaced by Michael Harvey 1717 - unseated on petition Replaced by Charles Stanhope 1717	
Milborne Port (seat 2/2)	James Medlycott	
Minehead (seat 1/2)	Sir William Wyndham Void Election; Replaced by Samuel Edwin - unseated on petition Replaced by Sir John Trevelyan	
Minehead (seat 2/2)	Sir John Trevelyan Void Election; Replaced by Thomas Gage 1717 - unseated on petition Replaced by James Milner- died Replaced by Sir Richard Lane 1721 - unseated on petition Replaced by Robert Mansel 1722	
Mitchell (seat 1/2)	Nathaniel Blakiston	
Mitchell (seat 2/2)	Robert Molesworth	
Monmouth Boroughs (seat 1/1)	William Bray - died Replaced by Andrews Windsor 1720	
Monmouthshire (seat 1/2)	John Morgan - died Replaced by John Hanbury 1720	
Monmouthshire (seat 2/2)	Thomas Lewis	
Montgomery (seat 1/1)	John Pugh	
Montgomeryshire (seat 1/1)	Edward Vaughan - died Replaced by Price Devereux 1719	
Morpeth (seat 1/2)	Viscount Morpeth	
Morpeth (seat 2/2)	The Viscount Castlecomer - sat for Ripon; Replaced by George Carpenter 1717	
Much Wenlock (seat 1/2)	see Wenlock	...
== N ==
Nairnshire (seat 0/0)	Alternating seat with Cromartyshire - unrepresented in this parliament	
Newark (seat 1/2)	Richard Sutton	
Newark (seat 2/2)	Conyers Darcy	
Newcastle-under-Lyme (seat 1/2)	Sir Brian Broughton	
Newcastle-under-Lyme (seat 2/2)	Crewe Offley	
Newcastle-upon-Tyne (seat 1/2)	Sir William Blackett, Bt.	
Newcastle-upon-Tyne (seat 2/2)	William Wrightson	
Newport (Cornwall) (seat 1/2)	Sir Nicholas Morice	
Newport (Cornwall) (seat 2/2)	Humphry Morice	Whig
Newport (Isle of Wight) (seat 1/2)	Anthony Morgan - sat for Yarmouth; Replaced by James Stanhope 1717 - ennobled Replaced by Sir Tristram Dillington 1717 - died Replaced by Thomas Stanwix 1720	
Newport (Isle of Wight) (seat 2/2)	William Stephens	
New Radnor Boroughs (seat 1/1)	Thomas Lewis	Whig
New Romney (seat 2/2)	Robert Furnese	Whig
New Romney (seat 1/2)	Edward Watson	
New Shoreham (seat 1/2)	Sir Gregory Page - died Replaced by Francis Chamberlayne 1720	
New Shoreham (seat 2/2)	Nathaniel Gould	
Newton (Lancashire) (seat 2/2)	Sir Francis Leicester	
Newton (Lancashire) (seat 1/2)	William Shippen	
Newtown (Isle of Wight) (seat 1/2)	Sir James Worsley	
Newtown (Isle of Wight) (seat 2/2)	Sir Robert Worsley	
New Windsor (seat 1/2)	Robert Gayer – void election Replaced by Sir Henry Ashurst, Bt 1715	
New Windsor (seat 2/2)	Christopher Wren – void election Replaced by Samuel Travers 1715	
New Woodstock (seat 2/2)	William Cadogan - ennobled Replaced by William Clayton 1716	Whig
New Woodstock (seat 1/2)	Sir Thomas Wheate - died Replaced by Charles Crisp Clayton 1721	
Norfolk (seat 1/2)	Thomas de Grey	
Norfolk (seat 2/2)	Sir Jacob Astley, Bt.	Whig
Northallerton (seat 1/2)	Leonard Smelt	
Northallerton (seat 2/2)	Cholmley Turner	
Northampton (seat 1/2)	George Montagu - succeeded to peerage Replaced by William Wilmer 1715	
Northampton (seat 2/2)	William Wykes	
Northamptonshire (seat 1/2)	Sir Justinian Isham	Tory
Northamptonshire (seat 2/2)	Thomas Cartwright	Tory
Northumberland (seat 1/2)	Thomas Forster - expelled for supporting the Jacobite Rising; Replaced by Francis Blake Delaval 1716	Tory
Northumberland (seat 2/2)	Earl of Hertford	
Norwich (seat 1/2)	Waller Bacon	
Norwich (seat 2/2)	Robert Brightiffe	
Nottingham (seat 1/2)	John Plumptre	
Nottingham (seat 2/2)	George Gregory	
Nottinghamshire (seat 1/2)	Hon. Francis Willoughby	
Nottinghamshire (seat 2/2)	William Levinz	
== O ==
Okehampton (seat 1/2)	William Northmore	
Okehampton (seat 2/2)	Christopher Harris	
Old Sarum (seat 1/2)	Thomas Pitt – took office Sir William Strickland 1716	. Whig
Old Sarum (seat 2/2)	Robert Pitt	
Orford (seat 1/2)	Clement Corrance	
Orford (seat 2/2)	Sir Edward Turnour - died Replaced by Sir Edward Duke 1721	
Orkney and Shetland (seat 1/1)	James Moodie	
Oxford (seat 1/2)	Thomas Rowney	
Oxford (seat 2/2)	Sir John Walter	
Oxfordshire (seat 1/2)	Sir Robert Jenkinson - died Replaced by Sir Banks Jenkinson 1717	
Oxfordshire (seat 2/2)	Francis Clerke - died Replaced by James Herbert 1715 - died Replaced by Henry Perrot 1721	
Oxford University (seat 1/2)	Sir William Whitelock - died Replaced by George Clarke | 1717	Tory; Tory
Oxford University (seat 2/2)	Wiliam Bromley	Tory
== P ==
Peeblesshire (seat 1/1)	Alexander Murray	
Pembroke Boroughs (seat 1/1)	Thomas Ferrers	Whig
Pembrokeshire (seat 1/1)	Sir Arthur Owen, Bt	
Penryn (seat 1/2)	Samuel Trefusis	
Penryn (seat 2/2)	Hugh Boscawen - ennobled Replaced by Viscount Rialton 1720	Whig; Whig
Perth Burghs (seat 1/1)	Patrick Haldane	
Perthshire (seat 1/1)	Lord James Murray	
Peterborough (seat 1/2)	Viscount Milton	Whig
Peterborough (seat 2/2)	Charles Parker	Tory
Petersfield (seat 1/2)	Norton Powlett	
Petersfield (seat 2/2)	Leonard Bilson - died Replaced by Samuel Pargiter Fuller 1715	
Plymouth (seat 1/2)	Sir John Rogers	
Plymouth (seat 2/2)	Sir George Byng - ennobled Replaced by Pattee Byng 1721	
Plympton Erle (seat 1/2)	Richard Edgcumbe	Whig
Plympton Erle (seat 2/2)	George Treby	
Pontefract (seat 1/2)	John Dawnay - unseated on petition Replaced by Sir William Lowther, 1st Baronet 1716	
Pontefract (seat 2/2)	Robert Frank - unseated on petition Replaced by Hugh Bethell 1716	
Poole (seat 1/2)	George Trenchard	
Poole (seat 2/2)	William Lewen	
Portsmouth (seat 1/2)	Sir Charles Wager	
Portsmouth (seat 2/2)	Sir Edward Ernle, Bt	
Preston (seat 1/2)	Henry Fleetwood	
Preston (seat 2/2)	Sir Henry Hoghton	
== Q ==
Queenborough (seat 1/2)	Colonel Thomas King	
Queenborough (seat 2/2)	Philip Jennings	
== R ==
Radnor Boroughs	see New Radnor Boroughs	...
Radnorshire (seat 1/1)	Richard Fowler	
Reading (seat 1/2)	Robert Clarges Void Election; Replaced by Charles Cadogan 1716	
Reading (seat 2/2)	Felix Calvert Void Election; Replaced by Owen Buckingham 1716 - died Replaced by Richard Thompson 1720	
Reigate (seat 1/2)	James Cocks	
Reigate (seat 2/2)	Sir John Parsons - died Replaced by William Jordan 1717- died Replaced by Thomas Jordan 1720	
Renfrewshire (seat 1/1)	Sir Robert Pollock, Bt	
Richmond (Yorkshire) (seat 1/2)	Thomas Yorke - died Replaced by John Yorke 1717	
Richmond (Yorkshire) (seat 2/2)	Hon. Harry Mordaunt - died Replaced by Richard Abell 1720	
Ripon (seat 1/2)	John Aislabie - expelled Replaced by William Aislabie II 1721	
Ripon (seat 2/2)	The Viscount Castlecomer - died Replaced by William Aislabie I 1719	
Rochester (seat 1/2)	Sir Thomas Palmer, Bt	
Rochester (seat 2/2)	Sir John Jennings	
Ross-shire (seat 1/1)	Charles Ross	
Roxburghshire (seat 1/1)	William Douglas	
Rutland (seat 1/2)	Lord Finch	
Rutland (seat 2/2)	John Noel - died Replaced by Marquess of Granby 1719 - succeeded to a peerage Replaced by Sir Thomas Mackworth 1721	
Rye (seat 1/2)	Phillips Gybbon	
Rye (seat 2/2)	Sir John Norris	
== S ==
St Albans (seat 1/2)	William Hale - died Replaced by Joshua Lomax 1717	
St Albans (seat 2/2)	William Grimston	
St Germans (seat 1/2)	Waller Bacon - sat for Norwich; Replaced by Lord Stanhope 1715	
St Germans (seat 2/2)	John Knight	
St Ives (seat 1/2)	Lord Harry Powlett	Whig
St Ives (seat 2/2)	Sir John Hobart	
St Mawes (seat 1/2)	William Lowndes	
St Mawes (seat 2/2)	John Chetwynd	
Salisbury (seat 1/2)	Francis Swanton - died Replaced by Anthony Duncombe 1721	
Salisbury (seat 2/2)	Edmund Lambert	
Saltash (seat 1/2)	Shilston Calmady	
Saltash (seat 2/2)	William Shippen - sat for Newton; Replaced by John Francis Buller 1718	Tory.
Sandwich (seat 1/2)	(Sir) Thomas D'Aeth	
Sandwich (seat 2/2)	Sir Henry Oxenden - died Replaced by Sir George Oxenden 1720	
Scarborough (seat 1/2)	John Hungerford	Tory
Scarborough (seat 2/2)	William Thompson	
Seaford (seat 1/2)	George Naylor	
Seaford (seat 2/2)	Sir William Ashburnham – took office Replaced by Henry Pelham 1717	
Selkirkshire (seat 1/1)	John Pringle	
Shaftesbury (seat 1/2)	Samuel Rush- unseated on petition Replaced by William Benson 1715 - unseated on petition after by-election Replaced by Sir Edward des Bouverie 1719	
Shaftesbury (seat 2/2)	Edward Nicholas	
Shrewsbury (seat 1/2)	Thomas Jones - died Replaced by Andrew Corbet 1715	
Shrewsbury (seat 2/2)	Corbet Kynaston	
Shropshire (seat 1/2)	Sir Robert Corbet	
Shropshire (seat 2/2)	Lord Newport	
Shoreham	see New Shoreham	...
Somerset (seat 1/2)	William Helyar	
Somerset (seat 2/2)	Sir William Wyndham, Bt	Tory
Southampton (seat 1/2)	Thomas Lewis	
Southampton (seat 2/2)	Richard Fleming	
Southwark (seat 1/2)	John Lade	
Southwark (seat 2/2)	Fisher Tench	Whig
Stafford (seat 1/2)	1st Viscount Chetwynd	
Stafford (seat 2/2)	William Richard Chetwynd	
Staffordshire (seat 1/2)	Lord Paget	Tory
Staffordshire (seat 2/2)	William Ward - died Replaced by William Leveson Gower 1720	
Stamford (seat 1/2)	Hon. Charles Cecil	
Stamford (seat 2/2)	Hon. Charles Bertie	
Steyning (seat 1/2)	Major General John Pepper	
Steyning (seat 2/2)	Robert Leeves -void election Replaced by William Wallis	
Stirling Burghs (seat 1/1)	Henry Cunningham	
Stirlingshire (seat 1/1)	Mungo Haldane	
Stockbridge (seat 1/2)	Thomas Brodrick	
Stockbridge (seat 2/2)	Martin Bladen	
Sudbury (seat 1/2)	Sir Hervey Elwes	
Sudbury (seat 2/2)	Thomas Western	
Suffolk (seat 1/2)	Sir Thomas Hanmer, Bt	
Suffolk (seat 2/2)	Sir Robert Davers, Bt	
Surrey (seat 1/2)	Hon. Heneage Finch - succeeded to a peerage Replaced by John Walter 1719	
Surrey (seat 2/2)	Sir Richard Onslow – took office Replaced by Thomas Onslow 1715 -succeeded to a peerage Replaced by Denzil Onslow 1717 - died Replaced by Sir William Scawen 1721	
Sussex (seat 1/2)	James Butler	Whig
Sussex (seat 2/2)	Hon. Spencer Compton	Whig
Sutherland (seat 1/1)	Sir William Gordon	
== T ==
Tain Burghs (seat 1/1)	Sir Robert Munro, Bt	
Tamworth (seat 1/2)	Samuel Bracebridge	
Tamworth (seat 2/2)	William Inge	
Taunton (seat 1/2)	Sir Francis Warre – unseated on petition Replaced by William Pynsent	Tory; Whig
Taunton (seat 2/2)	Henry Seymour Portman – unseated on petition Replaced by James Smith	Tory; Whig
Tavistock (seat 1/2)	Sir John Cope	
Tavistock (seat 2/2)	Sir Francis Henry Drake, Bt	
Tewkesbury (seat 1/2)	Anthony Lechmere – took office Replaced by Nicholas Lechmere 1717	
Tewkesbury (seat 2/2)	William Dowdeswell	
Thetford (seat 1/2)	John Ward	
Thetford (seat 2/2)	Dudley North	
Thirsk (seat 2/2)	Ralph Bell – took office Replaced by Thomas Pitt 1717	
Thirsk (seat 1/2)	Thomas Frankland	
Tiverton (seat 1/2)	Sir Edward Northey	
Tiverton (seat 2/2)	Thomas Bere	
Totnes (seat 2/2)	Stephen Northleigh	
Totnes (seat 1/2)	Arthur Champernowne - died Replaced by Sir John Germain 1717 - died Replaced by Charles Wills 1718	
Tregony (seat 1/2)	Sir Edmund Prideaux - died Replaced by Charles Talbot 1720	
Tregony (seat 2/2)	James Craggs - died Replaced by Daniel Pulteney 1721 - resigned Replaced by John Merrill 1721	
Truro (seat 1/2)	Spencer Cowper	
Truro (seat 2/2)	John Selwyn - took office Replaced by Thomas Wyndham 1721	
== W ==
Wallingford (seat 1/2)	Edmund Dunch - died Replaced by Henry Grey 1719	
Wallingford (seat 2/2)	William Hucks	
Wareham (seat 1/2)	George Pitt - sat for Hampshire; Replaced by George Pitt, junior 1715	
Wareham (seat 2/2)	Thomas Erle – pensioned Replaced by Henry Drax 1718	
Warwick (seat 1/2)	William Colemore	
Warwick (seat 2/2)	Hon. Dodington Greville	
Warwickshire (seat 1/2)	William Peyto	
Warwickshire (seat 2/2)	Andrew Archer	
Wells (seat 1/2)	William Coward - died Replaced by Thomas Strangways Horner 1716 - unseated on petition Replaced by John Dodd 1717 - died Replaced by Thomas Edwards 1719	
Wells (seat 2/2)	William Piers	
Wendover (seat 1/2)	Richard Grenville	
Wendover (seat 2/2)	Sir Roger Hill	
Wenlock (seat 2/2)	Thomas Newport - ennobled Replaced by Sir Humphrey Briggs 1716	
Wenlock (seat 1/2)	William Forester II	
Weobley (seat 1/2)	Paul Foley – unseated on petition Replaced by John Birch 1715	
Weobley (seat 2/2)	Charles Cornewall - died Replaced by Nicholas Philpott 1718	
West Looe (seat 1/2)	Rear Admiral George Delaval	
West Looe (seat 2/2)	Thomas Maynard	
Westbury (seat 1/2)	Willoughby Bertie – unseated on petition Replaced by Lord Carbery	
Westbury (seat 2/2)	Francis Annesley – unseated on petition Replaced by Charles Allanson	
Westminster (seat 1/2)	Edward Wortley-Montagu	Whig
Westminster (seat 2/2)	Sir Thomas Crosse, Bt	
Westmorland (seat 1/2)	Daniel Wilson	
Westmorland (seat 2/2)	James Grahme	
Weymouth and Melcombe Regis (seat 1/4)	John Baker - died Replaced by Edward Harrison 1717	
Weymouth and Melcombe Regis (seat 2/4)	Thomas Littleton	
Weymouth and Melcombe Regis (seat 3/4)	Lieutenant-General Daniel Harvey	Whig
Weymouth and Melcombe Regis (seat 4/4)	William Betts	
Whitchurch (seat 2/2)	General George Carpenter	
Whitchurch (seat 1/2)	Thomas Vernon - expelled Replaced by Frederick Tylney 1721 - unseated on petition Replaced by John Conduitt 1721	
Wigan (seat 1/2)	Sir Roger Bradshaigh	
Wigan (seat 2/2)	James Barry	
Wigtown Burghs (seat 1/1)	Sir Patrick Vanse	
Wigtownshire (seat 1/1)	John Stewart	
Wilton (seat 1/2)	John London	
Wilton (seat 2/2)	Thomas Pitt	
Wiltshire (seat 1/2)	Sir Richard Howe	
Wiltshire (seat 2/2)	Robert Hyde	
Winchelsea (seat 1/2)	Robert Bristow	
Winchelsea (seat 2/2)	George Bubb	
Winchester (seat 1/2)	George Brydges	
Winchester (seat 2/2)	Lord William Powlett	
Windsor	see New Windsor	...
Woodstock	see New Woodstock	...
Wootton Bassett (seat 1/2)	Sir James Long	
Wootton Bassett (seat 2/2)	William Northey	
Worcester (seat 1/2)	Thomas Wylde	
Worcester (seat 2/2)	Samuel Swift - died Replaced by Samuel Sandys 1718	
Worcestershire (seat 1/2)	Sir John Pakington	
Worcestershire (seat 2/2)	Thomas Vernon - died Replaced by Sir Thomas Lyttelton 1721	
Wycombe	see Chipping Wycombe	...
== Y ==
Yarmouth (Isle of Wight) (seat 1/2)	Sir Theodore Janssen - expelled (Director of the South Sea Company); Replaced by William Plumer 1721	
Yarmouth (Isle of Wight) (seat 2/2)	Anthony Morgan	
Yarmouth (Norfolk)	see Great Yarmouth	...
York (seat 1/2)	Sir William Robinson	
York (seat 2/2)	Tobias Jenkins	
Yorkshire (seat 1/2)	The 2nd Viscount Downe	
Yorkshire (seat 2/2)	Sir Arthur Kaye, Bt	

== By-elections ==
- List of Great Britain by-elections (1715–34)

== See also ==
- 1715 British general election
- List of parliaments of Great Britain
- Unreformed House of Commons
