= Joseph Jekyll =

British barrister, judge and Whig politician (1663–1738)

Sir Joseph Jekyll KS PC
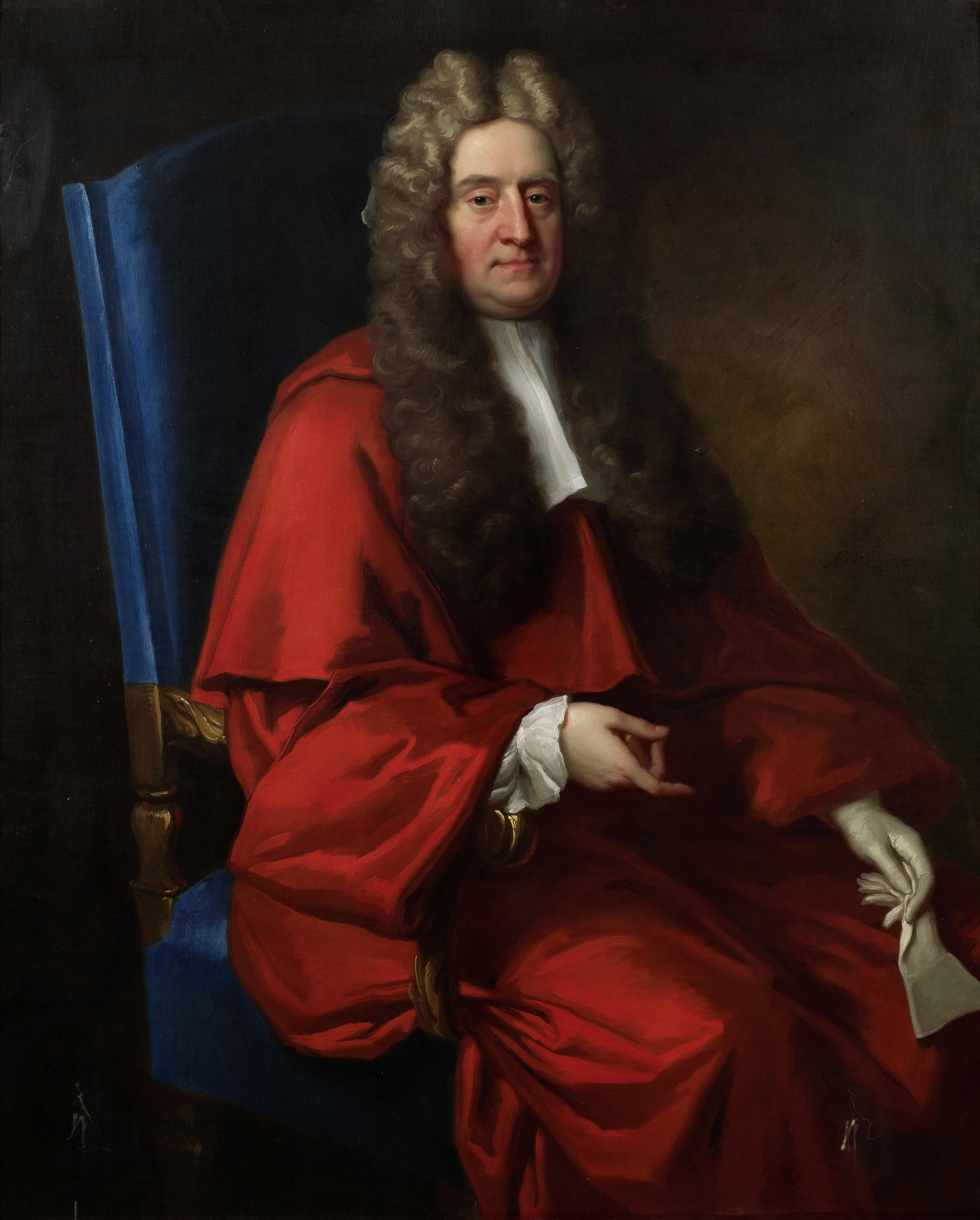
- Portrait by Jonathan Richardson

Chief Justice of Cheshire
- In office 1697–1717
- Preceded by: John Coombe
- Succeeded by: Spencer Cowper

Master of the Rolls
- In office 13 July 1717 – 19 August 1738
- Preceded by: Sir John Trevor
- Succeeded by: Sir John Verney

Personal details
- Born: 1663
- Died: 19 August 1738 (aged 74–75)
- Party: Whig
- Profession: Barrister, judge, politician

Sir Joseph Jekyll KS PC (1663 – 19 August 1738), of Westminster, was a British barrister, judge and Whig politician who sat in the English and British House of Commons for 40 years from 1697 to 1738. He became Master of the Rolls in 1717.

== Early life and career as a barrister ==
Jekyll was born in 1663 to John Jekyll of the Fishmonger's Company and alderman, of St Stephen Walbrook, London, and his second wife Tryphena. He was the half-brother of Thomas Jekyll. He attended a non-conformist seminary in Islington before being admitted to the Middle Temple in 1680. He was called to the Bar in 1687. Thanks to his connections with Middle Temple he became an associate of the Lord Chancellor, Lord Somers, and later married Somers' sister, Elizabeth. With Somers' support he became Chief Justice of Cheshire in June 1697, succeeding John Coombe, and was knighted on 12 December of that year. In 1699 he became a Reader of Middle Temple. In 1700 he became a Serjeant-at-Law, in 1702 a King's Serjeant and finally Prime Serjeant in 1714. Jekyll was very active in bringing cases before the House of Lords, acting in 14 cases in 1706 alone.

== Political career ==
Jekyll was returned as a Whig Member of Parliament for Eye at a by-election on 14 December 1697 and was returned again in the following year at the 1698 English general election. He was seen as part of the Whig Junto. He was extremely active in parliament and an excellent speaker. He played a role in drafting various bills and acts. Occasionally he voted against the party, mainly because he supported greater reform of the electoral system and the removal of bribery and corruption. He was returned unopposed for Eye in the two general elections of 1701 and in 1702 and 1705. Returned again at the 1708 British general election he was involved in the impeachment of Henry Sacheverell in 1709 and 1710. He was returned again for Eye at the 1710 British general election but at the 1713 British general election was returned instead for Lymington.

At the 1715 British general election Jekyll was returned again for Lymington. He was asked to participate in the secret committee tasked with preparing the impeachment of the Earl of Oxford and the Duke of Ormonde, which he refused to support. He persuaded the government to open an investigation into the collapse of the South Sea Company in 1720. At the 1722 British general election he was returned as MP for Reigate where he was returned again in 1727 and 1734. He sponsored the Mortmain Act 1735 (9 Geo. 2. c. 36) and the Gin Act 1736, and was noted for his opposition to intoxication, which annoyed the public so much that he was forced to have a guard at his house at all times. Under Robert Walpole he remained independent of the government in terms of how he voted, and was described by Alexander Pope as "an odd old Whig, who never change his principles or wig".

Outside Parliament, Jekyll provided £600 to fund the colony at Jekyll Island, and as a result James Oglethorpe named the island in the Province of Georgia after him.

== Master of the Rolls ==
On 13 July 1717, Jekyll was appointed Master of the Rolls, and the same year became a Privy Councillor. His time as Master "was distinguished by legal ability, integrity and despatch", and during this period he helped write The Judicial Authority of the Master of the Rolls. He was given the Great Seal on 7 January 1725, and held it until 1 June.

== Death and legacy ==
On 19 August 1738 he died of "a mortification in the bowels", and was buried in the Rolls Chapel. He had no children. In his will he left £20,000 to help pay off the national debt, something Lord Mansfield described as "a very foolish bequest... he might as well have attempted to stop the middle arch of Blackfriars Bridge with his full-bottomed wig".

Jekyll Island is named in his honor.

== Bibliography ==
- Foss, Edward (1870). A Biographical Dictionary of the Justices of England (1066–1870). Spottiswoode and Company.
- McCash, June Hall (2005). Jekyll Island's early years: from prehistory through Reconstruction. University of Georgia Press. ISBN 0-8203-2447-7.

Parliament of England
Preceded by Thomas Davenant; Charles Cornwallis	Member of Parliament for Eye; 1697–1707; With: Charles Cornwallis 1697–98; Spencer Compton, from 1698	Succeeded by (Parliament of Great Britain)
Parliament of Great Britain
Preceded by (Parliament of England)	Member of Parliament for Eye; 1707–1713; With: Spencer Compton to 1710; Thomas Maynard 1710–13	Succeeded by Thomas Maynard; Edward Hopkins
Preceded by Paul Burrard; Lord William Powlett	Member of Parliament for Lymington; 1713–1722; With: Lord William Powlett 1713–15; Richard Chaundler 1715–22	Succeeded by Lord Harry Powlett; Paul Burrard
Preceded by James Cocks; Thomas Jordan	Member of Parliament for Reigate; 1722–1738; With: James Cocks	Succeeded by James Cocks; John Hervey
Legal offices
Preceded by John Coombe	Chief Justice of Chester; 1697–1717	Succeeded by Spencer Cowper
Preceded by Sir John Trevor	Master of the Rolls; 1717–1738	Succeeded by John Verney
