= Robert Gray (MP) =

English politician

Member of Parliament for Hindon
- In office 1722–1727

Personal details
- Died: September 1730

Robert Gray (died September 1730) was an English politician who was Member of Parliament (MP) for Hindon from 1722 to 1727.

== See also ==
- List of MPs elected in the 1722 British general election
