= Charles Paulet, 2nd Duke of Bolton =

English Whig politician and peer (1661–1722)

His Grace The Duke of Bolton KG PC
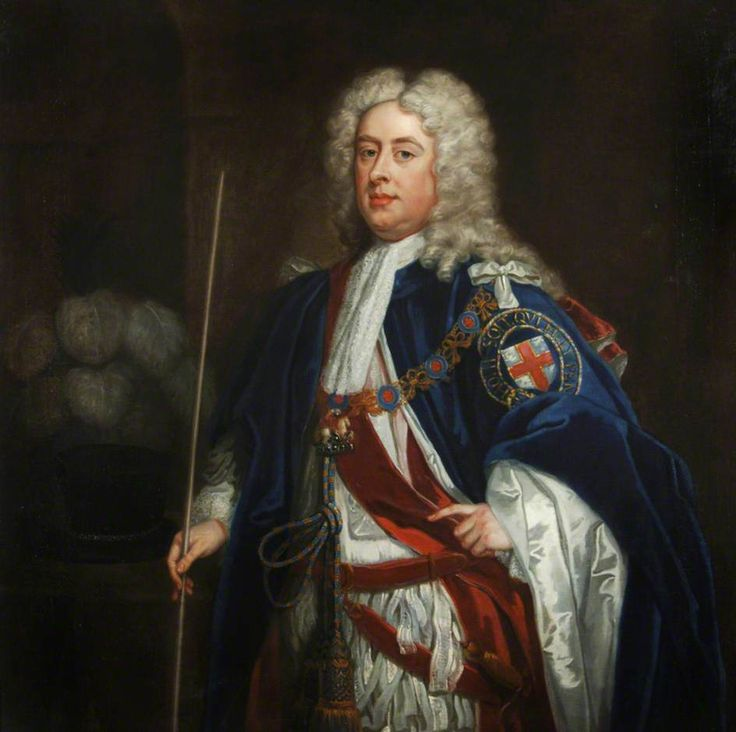

Lord Chamberlain of the Household
- In office 1715–1717
- Monarch: George I
- Preceded by: The Duke of Shrewsbury
- Succeeded by: The Duke of Newcastle

Lord Lieutenant of Ireland
- In office 27 April 1717 – 18 June 1720
- Monarch: George I
- Preceded by: The Viscount Townshend
- Succeeded by: The Duke of Grafton

Governor of the Isle of Wight
- In office 1707–1710
- Monarch: Queen Anne
- Preceded by: The Lord Cutts
- Succeeded by: John Richmond Webb

Member of Parliament for Hampshire
- In office 1681–1698 Serving with See: Sir Francis Rolle (1681–1685); The Viscount Campden (1685–1689); Lord William Powlett (1689); Thomas Jervoise (1689–1690); Richard Norton (1690–1691); Sir Robert Henley (1691–1693); Richard Norton (1693–1698)
- Monarchs: Charles II (until 1685); James II (1685–1688); Mary II and William III (1689–1694); William III (1694–1702)
- Preceded by: Thomas Jervoise
- Succeeded by: Thomas Jervoise

Lord Lieutenant of Hampshire
- In office 11 June 1699 – 15 September 1710
- Monarchs: William III (until 1702); Anne (from 1702)
- Preceded by: The Duke of Bolton
- Succeeded by: The Duke of Beaufort
- In office 5 August 1714 – 21 January 1722
- Monarch: George I
- Preceded by: The Duke of Beaufort
- Succeeded by: The Duke of Bolton

Lord Lieutenant of Dorset
- In office 9 June 1699 – 21 January 1722
- Monarchs: William III (until 1702); Anne (1702–1714); George I (from 1714)
- Preceded by: The Duke of Bolton
- Succeeded by: The Earl of Shaftesbury

18th Vice-Admiral of Hampshire
- In office 1714–1722
- Monarch: George I
- Preceded by: John Richmond Webb
- Succeeded by: The Duke of Bolton

Personal details
- Born: Charles Paulet; 1661
- Died: 21 January 1722 (aged 60–61)
- Spouse(s): Margaret Coventry (10 July 1679 – 7 February 1682); Frances Ramsden (8 February 1683 – 22 November 1696); Henrietta Crofts (1697 – 27 February 1730)
- Children: With Frances Ramsden: Lady Frances Powlett, Viscountess Mordaunt; Charles Powlett, 3rd Duke of Bolton; Harry Powlett, 4th Duke of Bolton; Lady Mary Powlett; With Henrietta Crofts: Lord Nassau Powlett
- Parent(s): Charles Paulet, 1st Duke of Bolton (father); Mary Scrope (mother)
- Education: Winchester College
- Alma mater: University of Cambridge
- Awards: Knight of the Order of the Garter; Privy Counsellor
- 2nd Duke of Bolton
- Tenure: 1699–1722
- Predecessor: Charles Paulet, 1st Duke of Bolton
- Successor: Charles Powlett, 3rd Duke of Bolton
- Other titles: 7th Marquess of Winchester; 7th Earl of Wiltshire; 7th Baron St John

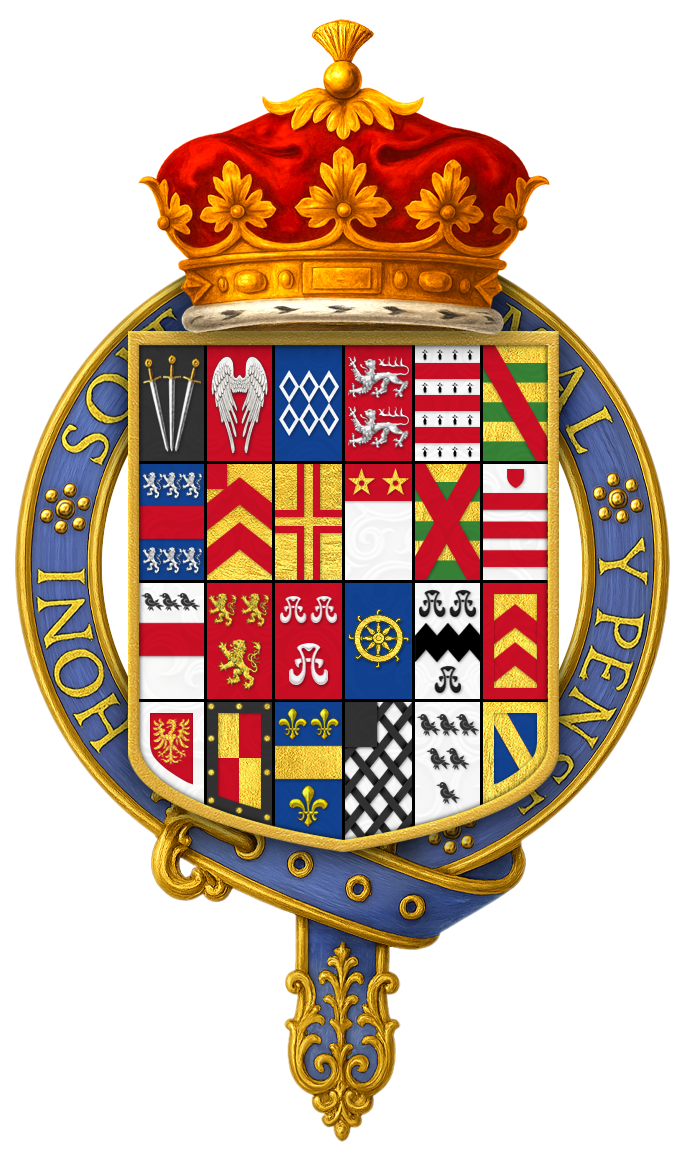
Quartered arms of Charles Paulet, 2nd Duke of Bolton, KG, PC

Charles Paulet, 2nd Duke of Bolton (1661 – 21 January 1722), styled Earl of Wiltshire from 1675 and Marquess of Winchester between 1689 and 1699, was an English Whig politician and peer. He was a supporter of William III of Orange and received many public offices after the Glorious Revolution. Under George I he was appointed Lord Chamberlain and Lord Lieutenant of Ireland.

== Early life ==
He was the son of Charles Paulet, 1st Duke of Bolton, and Mary Scrope, daughter of Emanuel Scrope, 1st Earl of Sunderland. He was educated at Winchester College and in law at Gray's Inn in 1674, before travelling in France between 1675 and 1678.

== Member of Parliament ==
In 1681, Lord Wiltshire was elected to the House of Commons of England as a Member of Parliament for Hampshire as an exclusionist, but left no trace on the records of the Oxford Parliament. He was re-elected to the Loyal Parliament in 1685 and was appointed to one parliamentary committee. By 1687, Wiltshire was listed by Lord Danby as being among the country opposition. In around May 1688, he was sent to Holland by his father; Wiltshire returned to England with William of Orange during the Glorious Revolution in November 1688. Wiltshire was subsequently tasked with informing the Commons that William was ready to receive their loyal address, assume the government of the kingdom, and hold a general election.

Wiltshire was re-elected at the 1689 English general election, likely unopposed, and was appointed to 28 committees in the new parliament. He was among those who prepared reasons for insisting that James II had abdicated and that the throne was vacant, after which he helped lead negotiations with Tory peers in the Lords. In this session he also served on a committee considering the Popish Plot and he spoke in favour of dismissing the Tory marquesses, Halifax and Carmarthen. He also spoke against Sir Robert Sawyer in a parliamentary debate about his actions under the previous regime. In 1689 he was appointed a justice of the peace and deputy lieutenant of Hampshire. On 9 April, his father was created Duke of Bolton and Wiltshire assumed the courtesy title of Marquess of Winchester.

He was elected again at the 1690 English general election and continued to be recorded on contemporary lists as a court Whig. On 13 June 1691, Winchester fought a duel with Richard Lumley, 1st Earl of Scarbrough. He spent much of the rest of that summer on campaign in Flanders during the Nine Years' War, having been appointed colonel of a volunteer horse regiment the previous year. In April 1694, Winchester was granted some forfeited Catholic estates in Staffordshire by King William. In January 1695, as Queen Mary's lord chamberlain, he was appointed to organise the late queen's funeral procession. Queen Mary's death deprived Winchester of a position at court, but he retained an annual pension of £1,200.

Lord Winchester was again elected unopposed to represent Hampshire at the 1695 English general election. He continued to serve the government loyally, which was now dominated by his friends in the Whig Junto. In February 1696, he was among the first to sign the Association of 1696 and he was sent to examine Sir John Friend in Newgate Prison. Winchester was supportive of the attainder of Sir John Fenwick, 3rd Baronet, but he was absent from the Commons' vote on the matter owing to the death of his wife.

In April 1697, Winchester was rewarded for his loyalty by being made one of the Lords Justices of Ireland alongside Henri de Massue, Earl of Galway and Edward Villiers, 1st Earl of Jersey. In this role, he came under the influence of Philip Savage, which caused a rift with the Earl of Galway. In 1697 he commanded a Regiment of Hampshire Militia foot under his father, the Lord Lieutenant of Hampshire.

== Duke of Bolton ==
At the 1698 English general election, Winchester was surprisingly defeated in Hampshire. He was initially hopeful at being returned on petition, but no ground for a successful petition could be found. In February 1699, however, his father died and he became Duke of Bolton and assumed his seat in the House of Lords.

He remained politically active in the Lords and a supporter of the Junto. As duke, he was appointed Lord Lieutenant of Hampshire himself and also of Dorset, a commissioner to arrange the union of England and Scotland, and was twice a lord justice of the kingdom. He was also Governor of the Isle of Wight. Between 1715 and 1717 he served as Lord Chamberlain in the household of George I of Great Britain and was Lord Lieutenant of Ireland from 1717 to 1720.

In Jonathan Swift's tract Remarks on the Characters of the Court of Queen Anne, a commentary on the book Memoirs of the Secret Services by John Macky, in response to Macky's statement that the Duke "Does not now make any figure at court", Swift's dismissive reply was, "Nor anywhere else. A great booby".

== Marriages and children ==
Charles married three times:

- First, on 10 July 1679 to Margaret Coventry (14 September 1657 – 7 February 1681 or 1682); Margaret was the daughter of George Coventry, 3rd Baron Coventry, and Margaret Tufton. No children resulted from this marriage.
- Second on 8 February 1682 or 1683 to Frances Ramsden (baptised 14 June 1661 – 22 November 1696), daughter of William Ramsden and Elizabeth Palmes. They had five children:
  - Lady Frances Powlett (baptised 20 October 1684 Chawton, Hants – d. 1715), married John Mordaunt, Viscount Mordaunt (d. 1710) in 1708.
  - Charles Powlett, 3rd Duke of Bolton (3 September 1685 – 26 August 1754).
  - Lady Betty Charlotte (baptised 21 December 1686 at Chawton, Hampshire)
  - Harry Powlett, 4th Duke of Bolton (24 July 1691 – 9 October 1759). He married Catherine Parry (d. 25 April 1744). The marriage resulted in the birth of Charles Paulet, 5th Duke of Bolton, Harry Paulet, 6th Duke of Bolton and daughters Catherine Paulett and Henrietta Paulett.
  - Lady Mary Powlett.
- Third, around 1697 to Henrietta Crofts (d. 27 February 1729 or 1730), a natural daughter of James Scott, 1st Duke of Monmouth and Eleanor Needham. They had a son:
  - Lord Nassau Powlett (d. 1741). He married Isabella Tufton, daughter of Thomas Tufton, 6th Earl of Thanet and Lady Catherine Cavendish.

== Literature ==
- Cokayne, George Edward; Gibbs, Vicary; Doubleday, Herbert Arthur; White, Geoffrey Henllan; Walden, Lord Howard de, Thomas Scott-Ellis (2000) [1910]. The Complete Peerage of England, Scotland, Ireland, Great Britain and the United Kingdom, Extant, Extinct or Dormant, new ed. Vol. 2. Gloucester: Alan Sutton Publishing.

Parliament of England
Preceded by Thomas Jervoise; Sir Francis Rolle	Member of Parliament for Hampshire; 1681–1698; With: Sir Francis Rolle 1679–1685; Viscount Campden 1685–1689; Lord William Powlett 1689; Thomas Jervoise 1689–1690	Succeeded by Richard Norton; Thomas Jervoise
Honorary titles
Preceded by Sir Robert Holmes	Vice-Admiral of Hampshire; 1692–1710	Succeeded by John Richmond Webb
Preceded by The Duke of Bolton	Lord Lieutenant of Hampshire; 1699–1710	Succeeded by The Duke of Beaufort
Preceded by The Earl of Bristol	Lord Lieutenant of Dorset; 1699–1722	Succeeded by The Duke of Bolton
Preceded by The Lord Cutts	Governor of the Isle of Wight; 1707–1710	Succeeded by John Richmond Webb
Preceded by The Duke of Beaufort	Lord Lieutenant of Hampshire; 1714–1722	Succeeded by The Duke of Bolton
Preceded by John Richmond Webb	Vice-Admiral of Hampshire; 1714–1722	Succeeded by The Duke of Bolton
Political offices
Preceded by The Duke of Shrewsbury	Lord Chamberlain; 1715–1717	Succeeded by The Duke of Newcastle
Preceded by The Viscount Townshend	Lord Lieutenant of Ireland; 1717–1720	Succeeded by The Duke of Grafton
Peerage of England
Preceded by Charles Paulet	Duke of Bolton; 1699–1722	Succeeded by Charles Paulet
