= Sir John Cope, 6th Baronet =

British banker and Whig politician

Sir John Cope, 6th Baronet (1673–1749), of Bramshill, Hampshire, was a British banker and Whig politician who sat in the English and British House of Commons for 36 years from 1705 to 1741. He was a Director of the Bank of England from 1706 to 1721.

== Early life ==
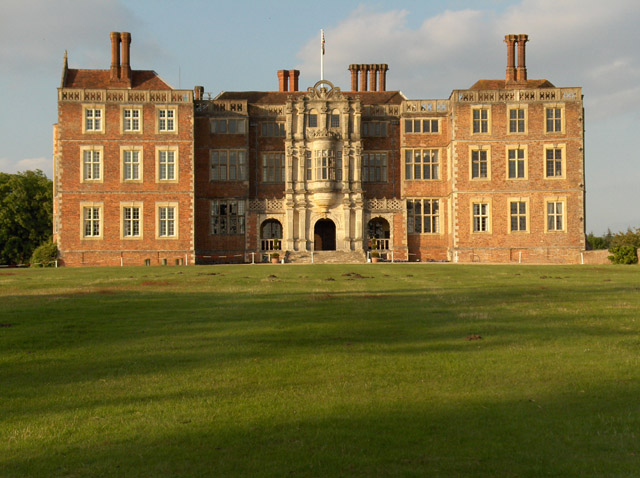
Bramshill House, south façade.

Cope was the eldest son of Sir John Cope, 5th Baronet of Hanwell, Oxfordshire and his wife Anne Booth, daughter of Philip Booth, and was baptized on 1 December 1673. He matriculated at Oriel College, Oxford on 22 October 1689, aged 16. He was knighted on 26 January 1696, and also in 1696 married Alice Monoux, daughter of Sir Humphrey Monoux, 2nd Baronet of Wootton, Bedfordshire. By 1700 Cope had acquired the manor of Bramshill for £21,500, helped by a loan from his father.

== Career ==
Cope stood for parliament at Andover in the second general election of 1701 and in the 1702 English general election, but was defeated on both occasions. After considering Stockbridge, he was eventually returned as Member of Parliament for Plympton Erle on the interest of Sir George Treby, at the 1705 English general election. He acted as a Whig and voted for the Court candidate for Speaker on 25 October 1705. In 1706, he became a Director of the Bank of England and remained, with statutory intervals, until 1721. He also became Commissioner of the Equivalent as a representative of the Bank in 1707, and continued to take an interest in the Union and Scottish matters. At the 1708 British general election he transferred to Tavistock, where he was returned unopposed as MP with the support of the Bedford interest. He acted as a teller for the Whigs and supported the naturalization of the Palatines in 1709. He was re-elected as Commissioner of the Equivalent in 1709 remaining until 1715. In 1710, he voted for the impeachment of Dr Sacheverell. At the 1710 British general election he was returned after a hard contest and avoided being petitioned unlike his colleague. He voted against the French Commerce bill on 18 June 1713. He was returned unopposed at the 1713 British general election and voted against the expulsion of Richard Steele on 18 March 1714.

Cope was returned as Whig MP for Tavistock in a contest at the 1715 British general election and was returned unopposed in 1722. He succeeded his father in the baronetcy on 11 January 1721. At the 1727 British general election he stood at Tavistock and Hampshire, and being returned at both decided to sit as MP for Hampshire. At the 1734 British general election he was returned as MP for Lymington and retired at the end of that Parliament.

== Death and legacy ==
Cope died on 8 December 1749. He had two sons and a daughter. He was succeeded in the baronetcy by his son Sir Monoux Cope, 7th Baronet.

Parliament of England
Preceded by Richard Edgcumbe; Richard Hele	Member of Parliament for Plympton Erle; 1705–1708; With: Richard Edgcumbe	Succeeded by Richard Edgcumbe; George Treby
Preceded by James Bulteel; Henry Manaton	Member of Parliament for Tavistock; 1708–1727; With: Henry Manaton 1708–1711; James Bulteel 1711–1715; Sir Francis Henry Drake, Bt 1715–1727	Succeeded by Sir Humphrey Monoux, Bt; Sir Francis Henry Drake, Bt
Preceded by Lord Harry Powlett; Lord Nassau Powlett	Member of Parliament for Hampshire; 1727–1734; With: Lord Harry Powlett	Succeeded by Lord Harry Powlett; Edward Lisle
Preceded by Lord Nassau Powlett; William Powlett	Member of Parliament for Lymington; 1734–1741; With: Colonel Maurice Bocland	Succeeded by Lord Nassau Powlett (Sir) Harry Burrard
Baronetage of England
Preceded by John Cope	Baronet (of Hanwell); 1721–1749	Succeeded by Monoux Cope
