= James Cocks (died 1750) =

British lawyer and Whig politician

- Born: 1685; Reigate, Surrey
- Died: 1750 (aged 64–65)
- Occupations: British lawyer and politician
- Political party: Whig
- Parent(s): Charles Cocks and Mary Somers

James Cocks (c. 1685–1750), of Reigate, Surrey, was a British lawyer and Whig politician who sat in the House of Commons between 1707 and 1747.

Cocks was the eldest son of Charles Cocks MP, a provincial attorney of Castleditch, Herefordshire and his wife Mary Somers, daughter of John Somers of Worcester, and sister of Sir John Somers, the lord chancellor. He matriculated at Trinity College, Oxford in. May 1700, aged 15. He was admitted at Middle Temple in 1702 and called to the bar in 1708. He succeeded his father who died in 1727.

Cocks’ uncle Somers had obtained a major electoral influence at Reigate after he received a grant of the manor of Reigate. Cocks was returned as Member of Parliament for Reigate at a by-election on 29 November 1707 and was returned unopposed at the 1708 British general election. He supported the naturalization of the Palatines and in 1710 he was listed as voting for the impeachment of Dr Sacheverell. As a result lost his seat at the 1710 British general election in the Tory backlash. He was returned again for Reigate in 1713 British general election and continued to support the Whigs, voting against the expulsion of Richard Steele on 18 March 1714.

Cocks was returned unopposed for Reigate at the 1715 British general election and voted with the Government from 1715 to 1719, when he opposed the Peerage Bill. In 1716 after the death of Somers the Reigate property fell to the Jekyll family to which Cocks was also connected. He was returned in a contest at the 1722 British general election and was unopposed in 1727 and 1734. He acted with the Opposition during Walpole’s Administration, and made his only reported speech in 1741 in a debate on the quartering of soldiers on the civil population. He was returned unopposed at the 1741 British general election but his name does not appear in any recorded division after the fall of Walpole in 1742. In 1745 he inherited Reigate and its electoral interest and Brookmans, Hertfordshire on the death of his aunt, Lady Jekyll. He stood down at the 1747 British general election and returned his nephew Charles Cocks in his place.

In September 1718, Cocks married Lady Elizabeth Newport, daughter of Richard Newport, 2nd Earl of Bradford. He married secondly, in May 1737, Anne Berkeley daughter of William Berkeley, 4th Baron Berkeley of Stratton. Cocks died on 26 May 1750, by which time he was very wealthy. His son by his first wife predeceased him and he left one son by his second wife.

Parliament of Great Britain
Preceded by Stephen Hervey; Sir John Parsons	Member of Parliament for Reigate; 1707–1710; With: Sir John Parsons	Succeeded by John Ward; Sir John Parsons
Preceded by John Ward; Sir John Parsons	Member of Parliament for Reigate; 1713–1747; With: Sir John Parsons 1715-1717; William Jordan 1717-1720; Thomas Jordan 1720-1722; Sir Joseph Jekyll 1722-1739; John Hervey 1739-1741; Philip Yorke 1741-1747	Succeeded by Charles Cocks; Philip Yorke
