= Maurice Morgan =

Maurice Morgan (1692–1733) of Freshwater, Isle of Wight, was a British Army officer and politician who sat in the House of Commons from 1725 to 1733.

Morgan was baptized on 27 September 1692, the second son of Anthony Morgan, of Freshwater, and his wife Catherine Urry, daughter of Thomas Urry of Freshwater. He joined the army and was ensign in Lord Paston's Regiment of Foot in 1704 and in the 3rd Foot Guards in 1709. He became a lieutenant in the 1st Dragoon Guards in 1712, captain in the 4th Dragoons in 1719 and captain and lieutenant-colonel in the 3rd Foot Guards in 1722.

Morgan was returned unopposed as Member of Parliament for Yarmouth (Isle of Wight) at a by election on 10 April 1725 on the government interest. He was returned unopposed again at the 1727 general election. He voted consistently with the Administration when present. He succeeded his father in 1729.and became Lieutenant-governor of the Isle of Wight in January 1731.

Morgan died unmarried on 24 April. 1733.

Parliament of Great Britain
Preceded by Anthony Morgan; Thomas Stanwix	Member of Parliament for Yarmouth (Isle of Wight); 1725–1733; With: Anthony Morgan 1725-1729; Paul Burrard 1729-1733	Succeeded by Paul Burrard; Maurice Bocland
