= Anthony Morgan of Freshwater =

British Army officer and Whig politician

Major Anthony Morgan (died 1729) of Freshwater, Isle of Wight was a British Army officer, and Whig politician who sat in the House of Commons between 1695 and 1729. He was a Lieutenant-Governor of the Isle of Wight.

== Early life ==
Morgan's parentage is unknown. He married Catherine Urry, daughter and heir of Thomas Urry of Freshwater, Isle of Wight by 1691, and by the marriage, acquired the manor of Freshwater. He was an army officer in the Life Guards and was Brigadier and lieutenant by 1691. He was exempt and captain in 1692, guidon and major in 1694 and cornet and senior major in 1697.

== Political career ==
Morgan began building up an electoral influence at Newtown and Yarmouth, and came into conflict with the new governor Lord Cutts who tried to bring the island's constituencies under government control. At the 1695 English general election Morgan was elected Member of Parliament for Yarmouth and signed the Association. He voted for fixing the price of guineas at 22 shillings in March 1695 and for the attainder of Sir John Fenwick on 25 November 1696. Under an electoral accord of 1697, he was returned unopposed at the 1698 English general election, and voted in support of a standing army on 18 January 1699. He was returned unopposed again at the two general elections of 1701 and was classed as a Whig. In 1702, he was appointed Lieutenant-Governor of the Isle of Wight, much to the annoyance of Lord Cutts, who still held a grudge against him and tried to prevent the appointment. At the 1702 English general election, Morgan was returned unopposed for Yarmouth again. He was returned again at the 1705 English general election and voted for the Court candidate as Speaker on 25 October 1705. He also supported the Court over the place clause of the regency bill in February 1706. He was returned as a Whig MP for Yarmouth at the 1708 British general election and voted for the impeachment of Dr Sacheverell in 1710. He lost his seat and his position with the change of government at the 1710 British general election and did not regain them until after the Hanoverian succession.

At the 1715 general election Morgan stood as a Whig at Yarmouth and Newport. He was returned at Newport and though initially defeated at Yarmouth was then seated after a petition on 12 April 1717. Thereupon he yielded the seat at Newport. He voted consistently for the Whig Administration. He was Lieutenant-Governor of the Isle of Wight again from 1715 until his death and was also governor of Cowes Castle from 1715 until his death in 1729. He was returned again at Yarmouth in the 1722 British general election. In the 1727 British general election he changed seats and was returned unopposed at Lymington.

== Death and legacy ==
Morgan died on 19 April 1729. He left six sons and a daughter, but disinherited his eldest son, and left the Freshwater estate to his five younger sons. His second son Maurice was MP for Yarmouth.

Parliament of England
Preceded by Henry Holmes; Charles Duncombe	Member of Parliament for Yarmouth (Isle of Wight); 1695–1707; With: Henry Holmes	Succeeded by Parliament of Great Britain
Parliament of Great Britain
Preceded by Parliament of England	Member of Parliament for Yarmouth (Isle of Wight); 1707 –1710; With: Henry Holmes	Succeeded by Henry Holmes; Sir Gilbert Dolben, 1st Baronet
Preceded by General John Richmond Webb; William Stephens	Member of Parliament for Newport (Isle of Wight); 1715–1717; With: William Stephens	Succeeded by Lieutenant-General James Stanhope; William Stephens
Preceded by Henry Holmes; Sir Robert Raymond	Member of Parliament for Yarmouth (Isle of Wight); 1717–1727; With: Sir Theodore Janssen; William Plumer; Thomas Stanwix; Colonel Maurice Morgan	Succeeded by Paul Burrard; Colonel Maurice Morgan
Preceded by Sir Gilbert Heathcote; Paul Burrard	Member of Parliament for Lymington; 1727–1729; With: Lord Nassau Powlett	Succeeded by Lord Nassau Powlett; William Powlett
