= Paul Burrard =

British Whig politician

Paul Burrard (29 May 1678 – 1735) of Walhampton, Hampshire was a British Whig politician who sat in the House of Commons between 1705 and 1735.

Burrard was the eldest son of Paul Burrard of Walhampton, Hampshire and his wife Anne Button, daughter of John Button of Lymington. He became a freeman of Lymington in 1699. He married Lucy Dutton, daughter of Sir William Dutton Colt, envoy to the courts of Hanover, Dresden, Celle and Brunswick on 17 October 1704. In 1706 he succeeded his father to Walhampton.

At the 1705 English general election, Burrard was returned as Whig Member of Parliament for Lymington where his family shared the interest with the Dukes of Bolton. He voted for the Court candidate for Speaker on 25 October 1705 and supported the Court in the proceedings over the ‘place clause’ of the regency bill on 18 February 1706 but was otherwise inactive in Parliament. In 1706, he was appointed a sub-commissioner of prizes at Portsmouth but resigned that office in November 1707. He was mayor of Lymington for the year 1708 to 1709. He was re-elected for Lymington at the 1708, and in parliament he supported the naturalization of the Palatines in 1709 and voted for the impeachment of Dr Sacheverell in 1710. He was returned at the 1710 British general election and on 7 December 1711 voted for the ‘No Peace Without Spain’. He was mayor of Lymington again for the year 1711 to 1712, but did not stand at the 1713 British general election. In 1714 he was appointed receiver of the land tax for Hampshire and in December 1714 commissioner for leather duty and commissioner for taxes in Hampshire with a salary of £500 p.a.

Burrard was Mayor of Lymington again from 1716 to 1717. In 1718 he yielded up the post of commissioner for leather duty but remained as commissioner for taxes until 1722. He was appointed deputy-lieutenant for Hampshire in 1721 and Ranger of the New Forest in 1722. He was returned to Parliament at the 1722 British general election, and again in 1727. He was Mayor of Lymington again for the years 1726 to 1727, 1729 to 1730 and 1733 to 1734. He was returned again at the 1734 British general election. He consistently voted with the administration. except on the Excise Bill, which he opposed.

Burrard died on 30 May 1735. He and his wife had four sons and a daughter but was survived by three of his sons.

Parliament of England
Preceded by Thomas Dore; Paul Burrard	Member of Parliament for Lymington; 1705–1707; With: Thomas Dore 1705; Marquess of Winchester 1705-1707	Succeeded by Parliament of Great Britain
Parliament of Great Britain
Preceded by Parliament of England	Member of Parliament for Lymington; 1707–1713; With: Marquess of Winchester 1707-1708; Richard Chaundler 1708-1710; Lord William Powlett 1710-1713	Succeeded by Lord William Powlett; Sir Joseph Jekyll
Preceded by Richard Chaundler; Sir Joseph Jekyll	Member of Parliament for Lymington; 1722–1727; With: Lord Harry Powlett 1722; Sir Gilbert Heathcote 1722-1727	Succeeded by Lord Nassau Powlett; Anthony Morgan
Preceded by Colonel Anthony Morgan; Colonel Maurice Morgan	Member of Parliament for Yarmouth (Isle of Wight); 1727–1735; With: Colonel Maurice Morgan; Maurice Bocland; Lord Harry Powlett	Succeeded by Thomas Gibson; Lord Harry Powlett
