= Sir Monoux Cope, 7th Baronet =

British politician

Sir Monoux Cope, 7th Baronet (c. 1696 – 1763) was a British Whig politician who sat in the House of Commons between 1722 and 1747.

Cope was the eldest son of Sir John Cope, 6th Baronet and his wife Alice Monoux, daughter of Sir Humphrey Monoux, 2nd Baronet of Wootton, Bedfordshire.

Cope was elected Member of Parliament for Banbury on his family's interest at the 1722 general election, succeeding a distant cousin Sir Jonathan Cope. He did not stand in 1727. At the 1741 general election he was returned unopposed as MP for Newport (Isle of Wight) on the government interest.

He was a supporter of Prime Minister Henry Pelham.

Cope succeeded his father in the baronetcy on 8 December 1749. He died on 29 June 1763, aged 67. He married Penelope Mordaunt on 27 July 1726 and had two sons and was succeeded in the baronetcy by his son John.

Parliament of Great Britain
Preceded by Sir Jonathan Cope	Member of Parliament for Banbury; 1722–1727	Succeeded by Hon. Francis North
Preceded by The Viscount Boyne; George Huxley	Member of Parliament for Newport (Isle of Wight); 1741–1747; With: Anthony Chute	Succeeded by Captain Bluett Wallop; Thomas Lee Dummer
Baronetage of England
Preceded by John Cope	Baronet (of Hanwell); 1749-1763	Succeeded by John Mordaunt Cope
