= William Gwyn Vaughan =

Welsh Tory politician

William Gwyn Vaughan (c. 1681–1753) of Trebarried, Breconshire, was a Welsh Tory politician who sat in the House of Commons from 1721 to 1734.

Vaughan was the second son of Gwyn Vaughan of Trebarried and his wife Mary Lucy, daughter of William Lucy, Bishop of St David's. In 1694, he succeeded his brother Thomas. He matriculated at Queen's College, Oxford on 12 May 1698, aged 16. He married Frances Vaughan, daughter of John Vaughan of Hergest

Vaughan was returned as a Tory Member of Parliament for Breconshire at a by-election on 30 August 1721. He was elected for Breconshire again in a contest at the 1722 general election, and was returned unopposed in 1727. He spoke against the Government in 1730 on the Hessians and in 1733 on the army estimates, and voted in 1733 against the Excise Bill and in 1734 for the repeal of the Septennial Act. He was defeated in a contest at the 1734 general election and did not stand again.

Vaughan died on 31 August 1753. He had six sons including Gwyn, John, Thomas and Walter and two daughters Mary and Frances.

Parliament of Great Britain
Preceded by Sir Edward Williams	Member of Parliament for Breconshire; 1721–1734	Succeeded by John Jeffreys
