= Lord Nassau Powlett =

English army officer and politician

The Right Honourable Lord Nassau Powlett KB

Member of Parliament for Lymington
- In office 1741–1741 Serving with Sir Harry Burrard
- Preceded by: Sir John Cope, Bt; Maurice Bocland
- Succeeded by: Sir Harry Burrard; Charles Powlett
- In office 1727–1734 Serving with Anthony Morgan, William Powlett
- Preceded by: Paul Burrard; Sir Gilbert Heathcote
- Succeeded by: Sir John Cope, Bt; Maurice Bocland

Member of Parliament for Hampshire
- In office 1720–1727 Serving with George Pitt, Lord Harry Powlett
- Preceded by: George Pitt; John Wallop
- Succeeded by: Lord Harry Powlett; Sir John Cope, Bt

Personal details
- Born: 23 June 1698
- Died: 24 August 1741 (aged 43)
- Spouse: Lady Isabella Tufton (m. 1731; died 1741)
- Children: Isabella Perceval, Countess of Egmont
- Parent(s): Charles Powlett, 2nd Duke of Bolton; Henrietta Crofts

Lord Nassau Powlett KB (23 June 1698 – 24 August 1741) was an English army officer and politician who sat in the House of Commons from 1720 to 1734 and in 1741.

== Early life ==
Powlett was the only son of Charles Powlett, 2nd Duke of Bolton by his third wife Henrietta Crofts. His father served, among other roles, as Lord Chamberlain of the Household to King George I. There were no children from his father's first marriage to Hon. Margaret Coventry (daughter of the 3rd Baron Coventry), but from his second marriage to Frances Ramsden (a daughter of William Ramsden), his elder half-siblings included Lady Frances Powlett (wife of John Mordaunt, Viscount Mordaunt), Charles Powlett, 3rd Duke of Bolton, and Harry Powlett, 4th Duke of Bolton.

His maternal grandparents were Charles Paulet, 1st Duke of Bolton, and Lady Mary Scrope (a daughter of the 1st Earl of Sunderland). His mother was the natural daughter of James Scott, 1st Duke of Monmouth (illegitimate son of Charles II of England and his mistress Lucy Walter), by his mistress Eleanor Needham.

== Career ==
He joined the army and was a cornet in the 12th Dragoons in 1715, captain in the 6th Dragoon Guards in 1718 and in the Royal Horse Guards in 1721. Powlett served as mayor of Lymington in 1723 and 1730.

He was returned as Member of Parliament for Hampshire in a by-election on 22 June 1720 and held the seat until the 1727 general election. In 1725, he became one of the founder knights of the Order of the Bath. He was returned as MP for Lymington in 1727 and held the seat until 1734 when he did not stand again. He regained his seat at Lymington in the 1741 general election but died soon after on 24 August.

== Personal life ==
In December 1731, he married Lady Isabella Tufton (d. 1764), the daughter and coheiress of Thomas Tufton, 6th Earl of Thanet and Lady Catharine Cavendish (daughter of the 2nd Duke of Newcastle). Together, they were the parents of one child, a daughter:

- Isabella Paulet (d. 1821), who married John Perceval, 3rd Earl of Egmont in 1765. They were the parents of John Perceval, 4th Earl of Egmont.

Lord Nassau died on 24 August 1741. After his death, she married Sir Francis Blake Delaval before her death on 10 January 1764.

Parliament of Great Britain
Preceded by George Pitt; John Wallop	Member of Parliament for Hampshire; 1720–1727; With: George Pitt 1720–1722; Lord Harry Powlett 1722–1727	Succeeded by Lord Harry Powlett; Sir John Cope, Bt
Preceded by Paul Burrard; Sir Gilbert Heathcote	Member of Parliament for Lymington; 1727–1734; With: Anthony Morgan 1727–1729; William Powlett 1729–1734	Succeeded by Sir John Cope, Bt; Maurice Bocland
Preceded by Sir John Cope, Bt; Maurice Bocland	Member of Parliament for Lymington; 1741–1741; With: Sir Harry Burrard	Succeeded by Sir Harry Burrard; Charles Powlett
