= Thomas Maynard (MP) =

Thomas Maynard (c. 1686-1742), of Hoxne Hall, Hoxne, Suffolk, was an English Member of Parliament.

He was a Member (MP) of the Parliament of England for Eye 1710-1715 and for West Looe 1715 - 1722.
