= Harry Powlett, 4th Duke of Bolton =

British nobleman and Whig politician

His Grace The Duke of Bolton PC

Lord Lieutenant of Hampshire
- In office 1754–1758

Personal details
- Born: 24 July 1691
- Died: 9 October 1759 (aged 68)
- Spouse: Catherine Parry
- Parent(s): Charles Paulet, 2nd Duke of Bolton and Frances Ramsden

Harry Powlett, 4th Duke of Bolton, PC (24 July 1691 – 9 October 1759), known until 1754 as Lord Harry Powlett, was a British nobleman and Whig politician. He sat in the House of Commons from 1715 to 1754, when he took his seat in the House of Lords.

== Early life ==
Born the second son of Charles Paulet, 2nd Duke of Bolton and Frances Ramsden, Powlett started his career in the Royal Navy. He served as an ADC to the Earl of Galway in Portugal in 1710, during the closing stages of the War of the Spanish Succession.

== Political career ==
Powlett was elected at the 1715 general election as a Member of Parliament (MP) for St Ives in Cornwall. He held the seat until the 1722 general election, when he was returned as MP for Hampshire. He held that seat until he succeeded to the peerage in 1754, with one interruption. At the 1734 general election he was returned both for Hampshire and for Yarmouth. A petition was lodged against the Hampshire result, and he sat for Yarmouth until 1737, when the petition against the Hampshire result was withdrawn, then chose to represent Hampshire rather than Yarmouth for the remainder of the Parliament.

He served as a Gentleman of the Bedchamber to Frederick, Prince of Wales from 1729 to 1751.

Powlett joined the Board of Admiralty in the Whig government in June 1733 and was advanced to Senior Naval Lord in March 1738 but had to stand down when the Government fell from power in March 1742. He went on to serve as Lieutenant of the Tower of London from 1742 to 1754 and was then sworn a Privy Counsellor in January 1755.

He succeeded his elder brother Charles Powlett, 3rd Duke of Bolton to the dukedom in 1754. He died on 9 October 1759 and was succeeded by his eldest son, Charles.

== Family ==
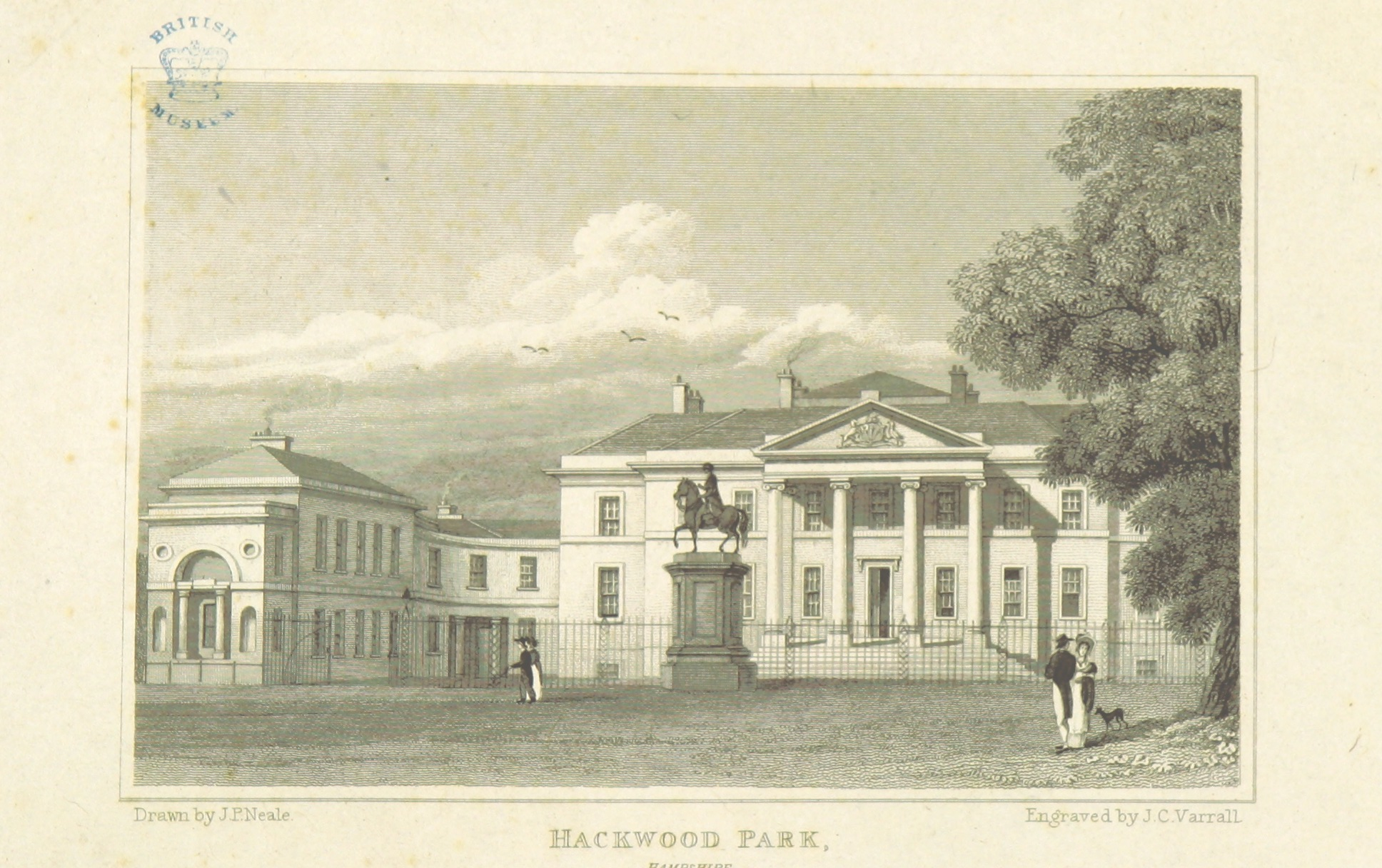
Hackwood Park, Hampshire

Powlett married Catherine Parry (d. 25 April 1744), by whom he had four children:

- Charles Powlett, 5th Duke of Bolton (d. 1765)
- Harry Powlett, 6th Duke of Bolton (1720–1794)
- Lady Henrietta Powlett (d. 22 December 1753), married on 12 July 1741 Robert Colebrooke of Chilham Castle (d. 1784), no issue
- Lady Catherine Powlett (d. 1775), married firstly William Ashe, secondly in 1734 Adam Drummond of Megginch (d. 1786), without issue by either.

The Duke of Bolton's properties included Hackwood Park in Hampshire, Bolton Hall, North Yorkshire, Edington in Wiltshire and Hooke Court in Dorset.

== Sources ==
- Rodger, N.A.M. (1979). The Admiralty. Offices of State. Lavenham: T. Dalton Ltd. ISBN 0900963948.
- Stooks Smith, Henry (1973) [1844-1850]. Craig, F. W. S. (ed.). The Parliaments of England (2nd ed.). Chichester: Parliamentary Research Services. ISBN 0-900178-13-2.

Parliament of Great Britain
Preceded by John Hopkins; Sir William Pendarves	Member of Parliament for St Ives; 1715–1722; With: Sir John Hobart, Bt	Succeeded by Sir John Hobart, Bt; Henry Knollys
Preceded by George Pitt; Lord Nassau Powlett	Member of Parliament for Hampshire; 1722–1754; With: Lord Nassau Powlett 1722–1727; Sir John Cope, Bt 1727–1734; Edward Lisle 1734–1741; Paulet St John 1741–1747; Francis Whithead 1747–1751; Alexander Thistlethwayte1751–1754	Succeeded by Alexander Thistlethwayte; Marquess of Winchester
Preceded by Maurice Bocland; Paul Burrard	Member of Parliament for Yarmouth (Isle of Wight); 1734–1737; With: Paul Burrard; Thomas Gibson	Succeeded by Anthony Chute; Thomas Gibson
Military offices
Preceded by Lord Archibald Hamilton	Senior Naval Lord; 1738–1742	Succeeded by Lord Archibald Hamilton
Honorary titles
Preceded by Hatton Compton	Lieutenant of the Tower of London; 1742–1754	Succeeded by Marquess of Winchester
Preceded by The Duke of Bolton	Lord Lieutenant of Hampshire; 1754–1758	Succeeded by Marquess of Winchester
Preceded by The Duke of Bolton	Vice-Admiral of Dorset and Hampshire; 1755–1759	Succeeded by Marquess of Winchester
Peerage of England
Preceded by Charles Powlett	Duke of Bolton; 1754–1759	Succeeded by Charles Powlett
