= Thomas Stanwix =

English soldier and politician (1670–1725)

- Born: 1670
- Died: 14 March 1725 (aged 54–55)
- Allegiance: Kingdom of Great Britain
- Branch: British Army
- Rank: Brigadier General
- Conflicts: War of the Spanish Succession

Brigadier General Thomas Stanwix (1670 – 14 March 1725) was a British Army officer and politician who sat in the House of Commons from 1702 to 1725. He served as Governor of Gibraltar.

== Career ==
Stanwix joined the Army and had become a captain-lieutenant in Hasting's Foot Regiment by 1692. In March 1702 he was elected Member of Parliament for Carlisle. He was appointed Lieutenant-Governor for Carlisle in 1705 and found that his main challenge was stopping the smuggling across the border between England and Scotland.

In 1703, during the War of the Spanish Succession, Stanwix was present at the Battle of Caia in Portugal. In 1711 he became Governor of Gibraltar. Except from a personal perspective he was unsuccessful as a governor, as his main achievement was to become richer than when he arrived. Observers felt that he should have concentrated on encouraging the Dutch to leave so that the benefits of the Capture of Gibraltar (in 1704) could be directed entirely in Britain's direction. Stanwick was tenacious as even when he was replaced by David Colyear he stayed on as lieutenant-governor for some months.

In 1713 Stanwix returned to England and became Mayor of Carlisle for 1715 as well as Deputy Lieutenant of Cumberland, thereby increasing his influence in the Carlisle area. He was a Whig MP who strongly supported Robert Walpole. He lost his seat in Carlisle in 1721 when seeking re-election on appointment to office, and instead became MP for Newport (Isle of Wight). He also became Governor of Kingston-upon-Hull in 1721 until his death. In the 1722 general election he was defeated at Carlisle but was returned as MP for Yarmouth (Isle of Wight).

Stanwix was also Governor of the Royal Hospital Chelsea from 1714 until 1720.

Stanwix died in 1725. He left his estates in Carlisle and Middlesex to his wife, and on her death to his nephew John Roos, on condition that he assumed the surname of Stanwix.

Parliament of England
| Preceded by Sir James Lowther; Philip Howard | Member of Parliament for Carlisle; 1702–1707; With: Christopher Musgrave 1702–1705; Sir James Montague 1705–1707 | Succeeded by Parliament of Great Britain |
Parliament of Great Britain
| Preceded by Parliament of England | Member of Parliament for Carlisle; 1707–1721; With: Sir James Montagu 1707–1713; Sir Christopher Musgrave, Bt 1713–1715; William Strickland 1715–1721 | Succeeded by Henry Aglionby; William Strickland |
| Preceded by William Stephens; Sir Tristram Dillington | Member of Parliament for Newport; 1721–1722; With: William Stephens | Succeeded by William Stephens; Earl of March |
| Preceded by Anthony Morgan; William Plumer | Member of Parliament for Yarmouth; 1722–1725; With: Anthony Morgan | Succeeded by Anthony Morgan; Maurice Morgan |
Military offices
| Preceded by Roger Elliott | Governor of Gibraltar; 1711–1713 | Succeeded by The Earl of Portmore |
| Preceded by Richard Philipps | Colonel of Stanwix's Regiment of Foot; 1717–1725 | Succeeded by Thomas Whetham |
| Preceded by The Viscount of Irvine | Governor of Kingston-upon-Hull; 1721–1725 | Succeeded by The Earl of Cholmondeley |
Honorary titles
| Preceded by John Hales | Governor, Royal Hospital Chelsea; 1714–1720 | Succeeded by Charles Churchill |
