= 1715 British general election =

Election in Great Britain

- 22 January – 9 March 1715

All 558 seats in the House of Commons 280 seats needed for a majority
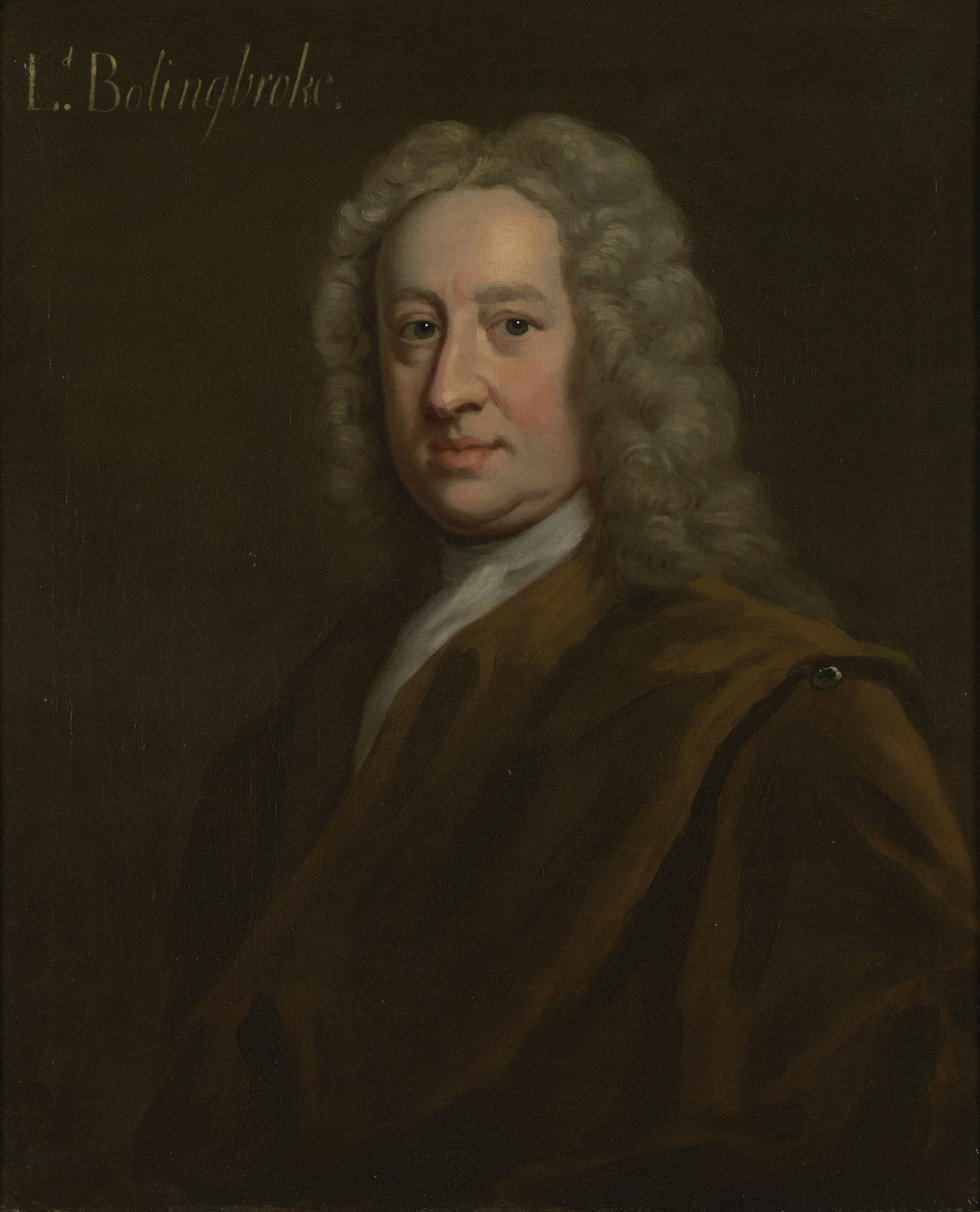
	First party	Second party
	Whi
Leader	Whig Junto	Viscount Bolingbroke
Party	Whig	Tory
Leader since	c. 1695	July 1714
Seats won	341	217
Seat change	▲180	▼152
- Composition of the House of Commons after election

The 1715 British general election was held on 22 January 1715 to 9 March 1715, to elect members of the House of Commons, the lower house of the Parliament of Great Britain. It returned members to serve in the House of Commons of the 5th Parliament of Great Britain to be held, after the 1707 merger of the Parliament of England and the Parliament of Scotland.

In October 1714, soon after George I had arrived in London after ascending to the throne, he dismissed the Tory cabinet and replaced it with one almost entirely composed of Whigs, as they were responsible for securing his succession.

The election of 1715 saw the Whigs win an overwhelming majority in the House of Commons, and afterwards virtually all Tories in central or local government were purged, leading to a period of Whig ascendancy lasting almost fifty years during which Tories were almost entirely excluded from office. The Whigs then moved to impeach Robert Harley, the former Tory first minister. After he was imprisoned in the Tower of London for two years, the case ultimately ended with his acquittal in 1717.

== Constituencies ==
See 1796 British general election for details. The constituencies used were the same throughout the existence of the Parliament of Great Britain.

== Dates of the election ==
The general election was held between 22 January 1715 and 9 March 1715. At this period elections did not take place at the same time in every constituency. The returning officer in each county or parliamentary borough fixed the precise date (see hustings for details of the conduct of the elections).

== Results ==

=== Seats summary ===
Parliamentary seats
Whig	61.1%
Tory	38.9%

== See also ==
- 5th Parliament of Great Britain
- List of MPs elected in the British general election, 1715
- List of parliaments of Great Britain
