= List of Great Britain by-elections (1715–1734) =

This is a list of parliamentary by-elections in Great Britain held between 1715 and 1734, with the names of the previous incumbent and the victor in the by-election.

In the absence of a comprehensive and reliable source, for party and factional alignments in this period, no attempt is made to define them in this article. The House of Commons: 1715–1754 provides some guidance to the complex and shifting political relationships, but it is significant that the compilers of that work make no attempt to produce a definitive list of each members allegiances.

== Resignations ==
See Resignation from the British House of Commons for more details.

Where the cause of by-election is given as "resignation", this indicates that the incumbent was appointed to an "office of profit under the Crown" causing him to vacate his seat and prohibited membership in the House of Commons. This office is noted in brackets.

In addition certain offices of profit, such as cabinet positions, required the MP to seek re-election. These offices are noted separately.

== Dates ==
During this period England (but not Scotland) counted its legal year as beginning on 25 March. For the purposes of this list the year is considered to have started on 1 January.

== By-elections ==
The c/u column denotes whether the by-election was a contested poll or an unopposed return. If the winner was re-elected, at the next general election and any intermediate by-elections, this is indicated by an * following the c or u. In a few cases the winner was elected at the next general election but had not been re-elected in a by-election after the one noted. In those cases no * symbol is used.

=== 5th Parliament (1715–1722) ===
Date	Constituency	c/u	Former Incumbent	Winner	Cause
1 April 1715	Andover	u*	John Wallop	James Brudenell	Chose to sit for Hampshire
5 April 1715	East Grinstead	u	Spencer Compton	The Viscount Shannon	Chose to sit for Sussex
7 April 1715	Portsmouth	u*	Sir Charles Wager	Sir Charles Wager	Comptroller of the Navy
16 April 1715	Aldborough	u	James Stanhope	William Monson	Chose to sit for Cockermouth
18 April 1715	Lymington	u	Lord William Powlett	Richard Chaundler	Chose to sit for Winchester
18 April 1715	Wareham	u	George Pitt	George Pitt, junior	Chose to sit for Hampshire
21 April 1715	Thirsk	u*	Thomas Frankland	Thomas Frankland	Clerk of the Deliveries of the Ordnance
27 April 1715	Carnarvonshire	u*	William Griffith	John Griffith	Death
30 April 1715	Aylesbury	u	John Deacle	Trevor Hill	Chose to sit for Evesham
3 May 1715	Haverfordwest	c	John Laugharne	Sir George Barlow	Death
3 May 1715	Haverfordwest	c	Sir George Barlow	John Barlow	By-election result reversed on petition 4 July 1715
3 May 1715	St Germans	u	Waller Bacon	Lord Stanhope	Chose to sit for Norwich
19 May 1715	Shaftesbury	c*	Edward Nicholas	Edward Nicholas	On Petition both incumbents were unseated and replaced by William Benson. A by-election was held for the second seat.
19 May 1715	Shaftesbury	c*	Samuel Rush	Edward Nicholas	On Petition both incumbents were unseated and replaced by William Benson. A by-election was held for the second seat.
25 May 1715	Oxfordshire	u	Francis Clerke	James Herbert	Death
27 May 1715	Renfrewshire	u	Sir Robert Pollock	Sir Robert Pollock	Governor of Fort William
31 May 1715	Essex	c*	Thomas Midleton	William Harvey	Death
31 May 1715	Essex	c*	William Harvey	Robert Honywood	By-election results reversed on petition 18 May 1716
7 June 1715	Northampton	c*	George Montagu	William Wilmer	Succeeded to a peerage
28 September 1715	Kent	u	Mildmay Fane	John Fane	Death
7 October 1715	Ayrshire	u*	John Montgomerie	John Montgomerie	Accepted a Commission in the Army
11 October 1715	Worcester	u*	Thomas Wylde	Thomas Wylde	Irish Revenue Commissioner
2 November 1715	Rutland	u*	Lord Finch	Lord Finch	Junior Lord of the Treasury
5 November 1715	Wenlock	u	Thomas Newport	Thomas Newport	Junior Lord of the Treasury
7 November 1715	Petersfield	u	Leonard Bilson	Samuel Pargiter Fuller	Death
8 November 1715	King's Lynn	u*	Robert Walpole	Robert Walpole	First Lord of the Treasury and Chancellor of the Exchequer
17 November 1715	Winchester	u*	Lord William Powlett	Lord William Powlett	Teller of the Exchequer
21 November 1715	Shrewsbury	u	Thomas Jones	Andrew Corbet	Death
30 November 1715	Surrey	u	Sir Richard Onslow	Thomas Onslow	Resignation (Teller of the Exchequer)
2 December 1715	Bedford	u*	William Farrer	William Farrer	Master of St Katharine's by the Tower
2 December 1715	Downton	u*	John Eyre	Giles Eyre	Death
7 December 1715	Bletchingley	u*	Thomas Onslow	William Clayton	Out-Ranger of Windsor Forest
27 December 1715	Newark-on-Trent	c*	Conyers Darcy	Conyers Darcy	Commissioner exercising the office of Master of the Horse
2 January 1716	Carmarthen	u*	Richard Vaughan	Richard Vaughan	Chief Justice of the Carmarthen Circuit
14 January 1716	Midhurst	u	John Fortescue Aland	John Fortescue Alan	Solicitor General for England and Wales
24 January 1716	Bere Alston	u	Lawrence Carter	Lawrence Carter	King's Counsel
26 January 1716	Malmesbury	u*	Joseph Addison	Joseph Addison	Lord of Trade
2 February 1716	Northumberland	u	Thomas Forster	Francis Blake Delaval	Expelled for supporting the Jacobite Rising
22 February 1716	Glamorganshire	u*	Robert Jones	Sir Charles Kemeys	Death
24 February 1716	Glasgow Burghs	u*	Thomas Smith	Daniel Campbell	Death
17 March 1716	Honiton	c*	Sir William Courtenay	Sir William Pole	Chose to sit for Devon
19 March 1716	Castle Rising	u*	William Feilding	William Feilding	First Clerk Comptroller of the Green Cloth
3 April 1716	Andover	u*	James Brudenell	James Brudenell	Master of the Jewel Office
6 June 1716	Reading	c	Robert Clarges	Charles Cadogan	Void Election
6 June 1716	Reading	c*	Felix Calvert	Owen Buckingham	Void Election
27 June 1716	Wells	c	William Coward	Thomas Strangways Horner	Death
27 June 1716	Wells	c	Thomas Strangways Horner	John Dodd	By-election results reversed on petition 12 April 1717
28 June 1716	Eye	u*	Edward Hopkins	Edward Hopkins	Irish Revenue Commissioner
30 June 1716	Denbighshire	c*	Sir Richard Myddelton	Watkin Williams	Death
30 June 1716	Maidstone	c	Sir Robert Marsham	Sir Barnham Rider	Elevated to the peerage
2 July 1716	New Woodstock	u*	William Cadogan	William Clayton	Elevated to the peerage
4 July 1716	Buckinghamshire	u*	Richard Hampden	Richard Hampden	Teller of the Exchequer
9 July 1716	Brackley	u*	Paul Methuen	Paul Methuen	Southern Secretary
11 July 1716	Plympton Erle	u*	Richard Edgcumbe	Richard Edgcumbe	Junior Lord of the Treasury
16 July 1716	Lancaster	u*	William Heysham	William Heysham, jnr	Death
16 July 1716	Wenlock	u*	Thomas Newport	Sir Humphrey Briggs	Elevated to the peerage
30 July 1716	Forfarshire	u*	John Carnegie	James Scott	Expelled for supporting the Jacobite Rising
3 August 1716	Old Sarum	u*	Thomas Pitt	Sir William Strickland	Resignation (Governor of Jamaica)
29 January 1717	Cardiganshire	u	Lewis Pryse	Owen Brigstocke	Expulsion for refusing to take loyalty oaths
27 February 1717	Midhurst	u*	John Fortescue Aland	The Lord Midleton	Resignation (Baron of the Exchequer)
28 February 1717	Ipswich	u*	Sir William Thompson	Sir William Thompson	Solicitor General for England and Wales
28 February 1717	Seaford	u*	Sir William Ashburnham	Henry Pelham	Resignation (Commissioner of the Alienation Office)
2 March 1717	Weymouth and Melcombe Regis	u	John Baker	Edward Harrison	Death
5 March 1717	Richmond	u*	Thomas Yorke	John Yorke	Death
6 March 1717	Herefordshire	u	Sir Thomas Morgan	Sir Hungerford Hoskyns	Death
9 March 1717	Christchurch	u*	William Ettrick	Francis Gwyn	Death
12 March 1717	Hereford	c*	The Viscount Scudamore	Herbert Rudhale Westfaling	Death
13 March 1717	Kingston upon Hull	u*	William Maister	Nathaniel Rogers	Death
15 March 1717	Reigate	c	Sir John Parsons	William Jordan	Death
19 March 1717	Leominster	c*	The Lord Coningsby	George Caswall	Became a British Peer
11 April 1717	Minehead	c	Sir William Wyndham	Samuel Edwin	Void Election
11 April 1717	Minehead	c	Sir John Trevelyan	Thomas Gage	Void Election
11 April 1717	Minehead	c	Samuel Edwin	Sir John Trevelyan	By-election results reversed on petition 23 May 1717
11 April 1717	Minehead	c	Thomas Gage	James Milner	By-election results reversed on petition 23 May 1717
12 April 1717	New Woodstock	u	Sir Thomas Wheate	Sir Thomas Wheate	Storekeeper of the Ordnance
16 April 1717	Morpeth	u*	The Viscount Castlecomer	George Carpenter	Chose to sit for Ripon
18 April 1717	Cambridgeshire	u	John Jenyns	Robert Clarke	Death
22 April 1717	Bridport	u	William Coventry	William Coventry	Second Clerk Comptroller of the Green Cloth
22 April 1717	Totnes	u	Arthur Champernowne	Sir John Germain	Death
22 April 1717	Tregony	u*	James Craggs the Younger	James Craggs the Younger	Secretary at War
24 April 1717	Dover	u*	Matthew Aylmer	Matthew Aylmer	Naval Lord
25 April 1717	Malmesbury	u	Joseph Addison	Joseph Addison	Southern Secretary
25 April 1717	Newport I.o.W.	u	Anthony Morgan	James Stanhope	Chose to sit for Yarmouth
25 April 1717	Stafford	u	William Richard Chetwynd	William Richard Chetwynd	Lord of the Admiralty
26 April 1717	Arundel	u	Thomas Micklethwaite	Thomas Micklethwaite	Junior Lord of the Treasury
29 April 1717	Cockermouth	c*	James Stanhope	Thomas Pengelly	First Lord of the Treasury and Chancellor of the Exchequer
1 May 1717	Hampshire	u	John Wallop	John Wallop	Junior Lord of the Treasury
2 May 1717	Berwickshire	u*	George Baillie	George Baillie	Junior Lord of the Treasury
2 May 1717	Haddingtonshire	u*	John Cockburn	John Cockburn	Lord of the Admiralty
16 May 1717	Bury St Edmunds	u*	Aubrey Porter	James Reynolds	Death
23 May 1717	Carmarthenshire	u	Marquess of Winchester	Sir Thomas Stepney	Elevated to the peerage
29 May 1717	Gloucestershire	c	Matthew Moreton	Matthew Moreton	Vice-Treasurer of Ireland
10 June 1717	Milborne Port	c(*)	John Cox	Michael Harvey	Death
10 June 1717	Milborne Port	c(*)	Michael Harvey	Charles Stanhope	By-election results reversed on petition 6 July 1717
17 June 1717	Leominster	c	George Caswall	George Caswall	Previous by-election declared void
25 June 1717	Tewkesbury	u*	Anthony Lechmere	Nicholas Lechmere	Resignation (Receiver-General and Cashier of Customs)
8 July 1717	Cockermouth	c	Nicholas Lechmere	Lord Percy Seymour	Chancellor of the Duchy of Lancaster (Two MPs elected due to a Double Return)
8 July 1717	Cockermouth	c	Nicholas Lechmere	Wilfrid Lawson	Chancellor of the Duchy of Lancaster (Two MPs elected due to a Double Return)
8 July 1717	Cockermouth	c	Lord Percy Seymour	Lord Percy Seymour	Seymour declared elected 18 January 1718
8 July 1717	Cockermouth	c	Wilfrid Lawson	Lord Percy Seymour	Seymour declared elected 18 January 1718
10 July 1717	Amersham	u*	The Viscount Fermanagh	The Viscount Fermanagh	Death
22 July 1717	Newport I.o.W.	u	James Stanhope	Sir Tristram Dillington	Elevated to the peerage
22 July 1717	Stockbridge	u*	Martin Bladen	Martin Bladen	Lord of Trade
23 July 1717	Lewes	u*	Thomas Pelham	Thomas Pelham	Lord of Trade
24 July 1717	Aldborough	u*	William Jessop	William Jessop	Commissioner and Receiver of the Alienation Office
26 July 1717	Lymington	u	Sir Joseph Jekyll	Sir Joseph Jekyll	Master of the Rolls
27 July 1717	West Looe	u	Thomas Maynard	Thomas Maynard	Commissioner for Stores in Minorca
30 July 1717	Thirsk	u	Ralph Bell	Thomas Pitt	Resignation (Customer of Hull)
8 August 1717	Fifeshire	u*	Sir John Anstruther	Sir John Anstruther	Master of Work to the Crown of Scotland
9 August 1717	Truro	u*	Spencer Cowper	Spencer Cowper	Chief Justice of Chester
29 November 1717	Penryn	u	Hugh Boscawen	Hugh Boscawen	Joint Vice-Treasurer of Ireland
30 November 1717	Buckingham	u	Abraham Stanyan	Edmund Halsey	Resignation (Clerk of the Privy Council)
3 December 1717	St Albans	c	William Hale	Joshua Lomax	Death
4 December 1717	Oxfordshire	u*	Sir Robert Jenkinson	Sir Banks Jenkinson	Death
4 December 1717	Oxford University	u*	Sir William Whitelock	George Clarke	Death
9 December 1717	Bere Alston	u	Horatio Walpole	Edward Carteret	Resignation (Surveyor and Auditor General of the Revenue in America)
13 December 1717	Ipswich	u*	William Churchill	Francis Negus	Resignation (Bookseller, Bookbinder, and Stationer to the King)
18 December 1717	Reading	u	Owen Buckingham	Owen Buckingham	Victualling Commissioner
25 December 1717	Surrey	c	Thomas Onslow	Denzil Onslow	Succeeded to a peerage
26 December 1717	Launceston	u	John Anstis	John Anstis	Garter King of Arms
31 December 1717	Guildford	u	Denzil Onslow	Robert Wroth	Out-Ranger of Windsor Forest
31 January 1718	Boroughbridge	c*	Thomas Wilkinson	Sir Wilfrid Lawson	Resignation (Joint-Receiver General of Land Taxes for Yorkshire, Durham and Northumberland)
22 February 1718	Barnstaple	u	Sir Arthur Chichester	John Basset	Death
26 February 1718	Bodmin	u	Francis Robartes	Earl of Burford	Death
4 March 1718	Haverfordwest	u	John Barlow	Sir John Philipps	Death
4 March 1718	Worcester	u*	Samuel Swift	Samuel Sandys	Death
19 March 1718	Tewkesbury	u	Nicholas Lechmere	Nicholas Lechmere	Attorney General for England and Wales
20 March 1718	Tregony	u	James Craggs the Younger	James Craggs the Younger	Southern Secretary
25 March 1718	Rochester	u*	Sir John Jennings	Sir John Jennings	Naval Lord
28 March 1718	Dover	u	Matthew Aylmer	Matthew Aylmer	Master of Greenwich Hospital
28 March 1718	East Retford	u*	Thomas White	Thomas White	Clerk of the Ordnance
28 March 1718	Portsmouth	u*	Sir Charles Wager	Sir Charles Wager	Naval Lord
28 March 1718	Rye	u	Sir John Norris	Sir John Norris	Naval Lord
28 March 1718	Wareham	u	Thomas Erle	Henry Drax	Resignation (Given a pension)
29 March 1718	Arundel	u*	Thomas Micklethwaite	Joseph Micklethwaite	Lieutenant-General of the Ordnance and Death
29 March 1718	New Woodstock	u	William Clayton	William Clayton	Junior Lord of the Treasury
4 April 1718	Ripon	u	John Aislabie	John Aislabie	Chancellor of the Exchequer
5 April 1718	Scarborough	u	William Thompson	William Thompson	Warden of the Mint
9 April 1718	Buckinghamshire	u	Richard Hampden	Richard Hampden	Treasurer of the Navy
24 April 1718	Lichfield	c(*)	Walter Chetwynd	William Sneyd	Paymaster of Pensions
24 April 1718	Lichfield	c(*)	William Sneyd	Walter Chetwynd	By-election results reversed on petition 10 December 1718
21 November 1718	Shaftesbury	c(*)	William Benson	William Benson	Surveyor of the King's Works
21 November 1718	Shaftesbury	c(*)	William Benson	Sir Edward des Bouverie	By-election results reversed 24 January 1719
22 November 1718	Weobley	c*	Charles Cornewall	Nicholas Philpott	Death
24 November 1718	Aldeburgh	c*	William Johnson	Samuel Lowe	Death
26 November 1718	Lostwithiel	u	Thomas Liddell	Edward Eliot	Death
27 November 1718	Cambridgeshire	u	John Bromley	Francis Whichcote	Death
1 December 1718	Saltash	u	William Shippen	John Francis Buller	Chose to sit for Newton
1 December 1718	Corfe Castle	c(*)	William Okeden	Joshua Churchill	Death (Two MPs elected due to a Double Return)
1 December 1718	Corfe Castle	c(*)	William Okeden	John Bankes	Death (Two MPs elected due to a Double Return)
1 December 1718	Corfe Castle	c(*)	Joshua Churchill	Joshua Churchill	Churchill declared elected 21 January 1719
1 December 1718	Corfe Castle	c(*)	John Bankes	Joshua Churchill	Churchill declared elected 21 January 1719
2 December 1718	East Looe	u*	James Bateman	Horatio Walpole	Death
23 December 1718	Lanarkshire	c*	James Lockhart	Lord Archibald Hamilton	Death
29 December 1718	Plympton Erle	u*	George Treby	George Treby	Secretary at War
29 December 1718	Totnes	u*	Sir John Germain	Charles Wills	Death
9 January 1719	Montgomeryshire	u*	Edward Vaughan	Price Devereux	Death
10 January 1719	St Germans	u	John Knight	John Knight	Secretary of the Leeward Islands
21 January 1719	Rutland	u	John Noel	Marquess of Granby	Death
3 February 1719	Leicester	u	James Winstanley	Thomas Noble	Death
26 March 1719	Ludlow	u*	Francis Herbert	Sir Robert Raymond	Death
21 April 1719	Lewes	u*	John Morley Trevor	Philip Yorke	Death
30 April 1719	Totnes	u*	Charles Wills	Charles Wills	Lieutenant General of the Ordnance
30 November 1719	Bridport	u*	William Coventry	Dewey Bulkeley	Succeeded to a peerage
30 November 1719	Malmesbury	u	Joseph Addison	Fleetwood Dormer	Death
1 December 1719	Wallingford	c	Edmund Dunch	Henry Grey	Death
3 December 1719	Aldeburgh	c*	Henry Johnson	Walter Plumer	Death
3 December 1719	Chichester	u	Sir Richard Farington	Henry Kelsall	Death
4 December 1719	Callington	u*	Samuel Rolle	Thomas Coplestone	Death
5 December 1719	Ripon	u	The Viscount Castlecomer	William Aislabie	Death
7 December 1719	Fowey	u*	Henry Vincent	Nicholas Vincent	Death
14 December 1719	Wells	c*	John Dodd	Thomas Edwards	Death
15 December 1719	Surrey	c*	Lord Guernsey	John Walter	Succeeded to a peerage
17 December 1719	Bishop's Castle	u	Richard Harnage	Sir Matthew Decker	Death
17 December 1719	Leicestershire	c*	Sir Thomas Cave	Lord William Manners	Death
5 January 1720	Elginshire	u	Alexander Grant	James Brodie	Death
9 January 1720	Ayr Burghs	u	Charles Oliphant	Thomas Kennedy	Death
25 January 1720	Richmond	u	Harry Mordaunt	Richard Abell	Death
2 February 1720	Newark-on-Trent	u	Conyers Darcy	Conyers Darcy	Master of the Household
15 February 1720	Guildford	u*	Robert Wroth	Arthur Onslow	Death
22 February 1720	Bath	c	Samuel Trotman	Robert Gay	Death
10 March 1720	Shropshire	u	Sir Robert Corbet	Sir Robert Corbet	Second Clerk of the Green Cloth
15 March 1720	Reading	c	Owen Buckingham	Richard Thompson	Death
15 March 1720	Tregony	u	Sir Edmund Prideaux	Charles Talbot	Death
24 March 1720	Monmouthshire	u*	John Morgan	John Hanbury	Death
25 March 1720	Winchelsea	u*	Robert Bristow	Robert Bristow	Second Clerk Comptroller of the Green Cloth
30 March 1720	Gloucestershire	u*	Thomas Stephens	Henry Berkeley	Death
30 March 1720	Lewes	u	Philip Yorke	Philip Yorke	Solicitor General for England and Wales
16 April 1720	Knaresborough	u*	The Earl Mountrath	Richard Arundell	Death
19 April 1720	Bridgwater	c	George Dodington	William Pitt	Death
20 April 1720	Chippenham	u	Giles Earle	Giles Earle	First Clerk Comptroller of the Green Cloth
21 April 1720	Reigate	u	William Jordan	Thomas Jordan	Death
23 April 1720	Dorchester	c	Henry Trenchard	Robert Browne	Death
23 April 1720	Dorchester	c	Robert Browne	Abraham Janssen	By-election results reversed 18 May 1720
6 May 1720	Hindon	u	Reynolds Calthorpe	John Pitt	Death
9 May 1720	Sandwich	c*	Sir Henry Oxenden	Sir George Oxenden	Death
11 May 1720	Haddington Burghs	u	Sir David Dalrymple	Sir David Dalrymple	Auditor of the Exchequer in Scotland
13 May 1720	Monmouth	u	William Bray	Andrews Windsor	Death
21 May 1720	Ludlow	u	Sir Robert Raymond	Sir Robert Raymond	Attorney General for England and Wales
25 May 1720	Nottingham	u*	John Plumptre	John Plumptre	Treasurer of the Ordnance
7 June 1720	Seaford	u*	Henry Pelham	Henry Pelham	Treasurer of the Chamber
11 June 1720	Corfe Castle	u	Joshua Churchill	Joshua Churchill	Victualling Commissioner
11 June 1720	Seaford	u*	Sir Gregory Page	Francis Chamberlayne	Death
14 June 1720	Old Sarum	u	Sir William Strickland	Sir William Strickland	Muster-Master General
18 June 1720	Boroughbridge	u	Sir Wilfrid Lawson	Sir Wilfrid Lawson	Groom of the Bedchamber
18 June 1720	Bossiney	u	Henry Cartwright	Henry Cartwright	Victualling Commissioner
22 June 1720	Gloucestershire	u	Matthew Moreton	Edmund Bray	Elevated to the peerage
22 June 1720	Hampshire	u*	John Wallop	Lord Nassau Powlett	Elevated to the peerage
22 June 1720	King's Lynn	u*	Robert Walpole	Robert Walpole	Paymaster of the Forces
22 June 1720	King's Lynn	u*	Sir Charles Turner	Sir Charles Turner	Junior Lord of the Treasury
23 June 1720	Castle Rising	u*	Charles Churchill	Charles Churchill	Governor of Royal Hospital Chelsea
23 June 1720	Plympton Erle	u*	Richard Edgcumbe	Richard Edgcumbe	Junior Lord of the Treasury
24 June 1720	Brackley	u*	Paul Methuen	Paul Methuen	Comptroller of the Household
24 June 1720	Penryn	u	Hugh Boscawen	Viscount Rialton	Elevated to the peerage
25 June 1720	Lostwithiel	u	Edward Eliot	John Newsham	Resignation (Commissioner of Excise)
11 July 1720	Kingston upon Hull	u*	Sir William St Quintin	Sir William St Quintin	Joint Vice-Treasurer of Ireland
19 July 1720	Heytesbury	u*	Edward Ashe	Edward Ashe	Lord of Trade
7 December 1720	Boston	c*	Richard Wynn	Richard Ellys	Death
14 December 1720	Rochester	u*	Sir John Jennings	Sir John Jennings	Governor of Greenwich Hospital
19 December 1720	Cambridge University	c*	Thomas Paske	Thomas Willoughby	Death
19 December 1720	Plymouth	u	Sir George Byng	Sir George Byng	Treasurer of the Navy
20 December 1720	Dover	u*	The Lord Aylmer	George Berkeley	Death
20 December 1720	Dover	u*	Philip Papillon	Henry Furnese	Resignation (Receiver of the Stamp Duties)
29 December 1720	Elginshire	u*	James Brodie	Alexander Brodie	Death
29 December 1720	Staffordshire	u*	William Ward	William Leveson Gower	Death
3 January 1721	Lincolnshire	c*	Sir Willoughby Hickman	Sir William Massingberd	Death
1 February 1721	Cricklade	c	Jacob Sawbridge	Matthew Ducie Moreton	Expulsion (Director of the South Sea Company)
8 February 1721	Devizes	u*	Francis Eyles	Benjamin Haskins Stiles	Expulsion (Director of the South Sea Company)
10 February 1721	Yarmouth	u	Sir Theodore Janssen	William Plumer	Expulsion (Director of the South Sea Company)
11 February 1721	Great Grimsby	c	Sir Robert Chaplin	Arthur Moore	Expulsion (Director of the South Sea Company)
25 February 1721	Corfe Castle	u	Joshua Churchill	John Bond	Death
6 March 1721	Worcestershire	u*	Thomas Vernon	Sir Thomas Lyttelton	Death
13 March 1721	Grampound	u	Charles Cooke	Richard West	Death
17 March 1721	Truro	u*	John Selwyn	Thomas Wyndham	Resignation (Receiver General and Comptroller of Customs)
18 March 1721	Edinburgh	u*	Sir George Warrender	John Campbell	Death
23 March 1721	Tregony	u	James Craggs the Younger	Daniel Pulteney	Death
24 March 1721	Leominster	u	George Caswall	William Bateman	Expulsion
1 April 1721	Ripon	u*	John Aislabie	William Aislabie	Expulsion
5 April 1721	Rutland	u	Marquess of Granby	Sir Thomas Mackworth	Succeeded to a peerage
10 April 1721	King's Lynn	u*	Robert Walpole	Robert Walpole	First Lord of the Treasury and Chancellor of the Exchequer
10 April 1721	Seaford	u	Henry Pelham	Henry Pelham	Junior Lord of the Treasury
12 April 1721	Carlisle	c*	Thomas Stanwix	Henry Aglionby	Governor of Kingston upon Hull
29 April 1721	Bere Alston	c(*)	Edward Carteret	Philip Cavendish	Resignation (Joint-Postmaster General)
29 April 1721	Bere Alston	c(*)	Philip Cavendish	St John Brodrick	By-election results reversed on petition 6 June 1721
1 May 1721	Lostwithiel	u*	Galfridus Walpole	Marquess of Hartington	Resignation (Joint-Postmaster General)
6 May 1721	Salisbury	u*	Francis Swanton	Anthony Duncombe	Death
11 May 1721	Launceston	u*	Edward Herle	Alexander Pendarves	Death
17 May 1721	Oxfordshire	u*	James Herbert	Henry Perrot	Death
25 May 1721	Whitchurch	c(*)	Thomas Vernon	Frederick Tylney	Expulsion for attempting to influence a member of a committee on the South Sea Bubble
25 May 1721	Whitchurch	c(*)	Frederick Tylney	John Conduitt	By-elections results reversed 26 June 1721
10 June 1721	Flint Boroughs	u*	Sir John Conway	Thomas Eyton	Death
12 June 1721	Horsham	u*	Arthur Ingram	Charles Eversfield	Became a Scottish Peer
20 July 1721	Cockermouth	u	Lord Percy Seymour	Anthony Lowther	Death
24 July 1721	Surrey	u	Denzil Onslow	Sir William Scawen	Death
2 August 1720	Newport I.o.W.	u	Sir Tristram Dillington	Thomas Stanwix	Death
30 August 1721	Breconshire	u*	Edward Williams	William Gwyn Vaughan	Death
2 September 1721	Ayr Burghs	u	Thomas Kennedy	Duncan Forbes	Resignation (Baron of the Scottish Exchequer)
25 October 1721	Tewkesbury	c*	Nicholas Lechmere	The Viscount Gage	Elevated to the peerage
27 October 1721	New Woodstock	u	Sir Thomas Wheate	Charles Crisp Clayton	Death
31 October 1721	Plymouth	u	Sir George Byng	Pattee Byng	Elevated to the peerage
1 November 1721	St Ives	c*	Sir John Hobart	Sir John Hobart	Lord of Trade
6 November 1721	Midhurst	u	William Woodward Knight	Sir Richard Mill	Death
7 November 1721	Hedon	u*	Hugh Cholmley	Daniel Pulteney	Resignation (Victualling Commissioner)
7 November 1721	Tregony	u*	Daniel Pulteney	John Merrill	Lord of the Admiralty
22 November 1721	Barnstaple	u*	John Basset	Sir Hugh Acland	Death
18 December 1721	Minehead	c(*)	James Milner	Sir Richard Lane	Death
18 December 1721	Minehead	c(*)	Sir Richard Lane	Robert Mansel	By-election results reversed on petition 9 January 1722
29 December 1721	Orford	c	Sir Edward Turnor	Sir Edward Duke	Death
5 January 1722	Haddington Burghs	u*	Sir David Dalrymple	Sir James Dalrymple	Death
8 February 1722	Chipping Wycombe	u	Sir John Wittewrong	John Neale	Death

=== 6th Parliament (1722–1727) ===
Date	Constituency	c/u	Former Incumbent	Winner	Cause
22 October 1722	Buckingham	u	Alexander Denton	William Heathcote	Resignation (Justice of the Common Pleas)
24 October 1722	Boroughbridge	u	Conyers Darcy	Joseph Danvers	Chose to sit for Richmond
24 October 1722	Oxford	u	Sir John Walter	Francis Knollys	Death
24 October 1722	Stamford	u*	Brownlow Cecil	William Noel	Succeeded to a peerage
25 October 1722	Cambridge	u	Sir John Hynde Cotton	Gilbert Affleck	Chose to sit for Cambridgeshire
26 October 1722	Marlborough	u*	Earl of Hertford	Thomas Gibson	Chose to sit for Northumberland
27 October 1722	Amersham	u	Montague Garrard Drake	Thomas Chapman	Chose to sit for Buckinghamshire
27 October 1722	East Looe	u	Horatio Walpole	William Lowndes	Chose to sit for Great Yarmouth
27 October 1722	Huntingdonshire	u	Viscount Hinchingbrooke	John Proby	Death
27 October 1722	Lymington	u	Lord Harry Powlett	Sir Gilbert Heathcote	Chose to sit for Hampshire
29 October 1722	Newport I.o.W.	u	Earl of March	Charles Cadogan	Chose to sit for Chichester
31 October 1722	Suffolk	u*	Sir Robert Davers	Sir William Barker	Death
1 November 1722	Winchelsea	u	George Bubb Dodington	Thomas Townshend	Chose to sit for Bridgwater
2 November 1722	Liskeard	u*	Edward Eliot	Thomas Clutterbuck	Death
3 November 1722	Eye	u	Spencer Compton	James Cornwallis	Chose to sit for Sussex
3 November 1722	Eye	u	Edward Hopkins	Edward Hopkins	Master of the Revels in Ireland
3 November 1722	Old Sarum	u	Robert Pitt	George Morton Pitt	Chose to sit for Okehampton
6 November 1722	East Grinstead	u*	Spencer Compton	The Viscount Shannon	Chose to sit for Sussex
6 November 1722	Wiltshire	u	Robert Hyde	Richard Goddard	Death
22 November 1722	Warwick	c*	William Colemore	Sir William Keyt	Death
27 November 1722	Pembroke Boroughs	u*	Thomas Ferrers	William Owen	Death
3 December 1722	Westminster	c	Archibald Hutcheson	Charles Montagu	Void Election
3 December 1722	Westminster	c	John Cotton	The Lord Carpenter	Void Election
7 December 1722	Dunwich	c	Edward Vernon	Sir John Ward	Chose to sit for Penryn
11 December 1722	Coventry	c*	Sir Adolphus Oughton	Sir Adolphus Oughton	Void Election
11 December 1722	Coventry	c*	John Neale	John Neale	Void Election
11 December 1722	Ilchester	u	William Burroughs	Thomas Paget	Resignation (Auditor of the Leather Duty)
11 December 1722	Newport (Cornwall)	u	Sir William Pole	John Morice	Chose to sit for Honiton
22 January 1723	Chippenham	c	Edward Rolt	Thomas Boucher	Death
25 January 1723	Malmesbury	u	John Fermor	Charles Stewart	Death
31 January 1723	Beverley	c	Sir Charles Hotham	Sir Charles Hotham	Death
2 February 1723	Liverpool	c	Sir Thomas Johnson	Langham Booth	Resignation (Collector of Customs on the Rappahannock River in Virginia)
3 February 1723	Saltash	u	Thomas Swanton	Philip Lloyd	Death
11 February 1723	Calne	u	Benjamin Haskins-Stiles	Edmund Pike Heath	Chose to sit for Devizes
18 February 1723	Bramber	u	William Charles van Huls	David Polhill	Death
20 February 1723	Northumberland	c(*)	Earl of Hertford	William Wrightson	Elevated to the peerage
20 February 1723	Northumberland	c(*)	William Wrightson	Ralph Jenison	By-election results reversed on petition 16 April 1724
28 February 1723	Calne	u	George Duckett	Matthew Ducie Moreton	Resignation (Commissioner of Excise)
11 March 1723	Berwick-upon-Tweed	u	The Viscount Barrington	Henry Grey	Expulsion
19 March 1723	Queenborough	u	James Littleton	Viscount Forbes	Death
2 April 1723	Hereford	c	William Mayo	James Wallwyn	Death
2 May 1723	Appleby	c	Sir Richard Sandford	James Lowther	Death
7 May 1723	Berwick-upon-Tweed	c	Grey Neville	William Kerr	Death
24 May 1723	Brecon	c*	William Morgan	Thomas Morgan	Chose to sit for Monmouthshire
24 May 1723	Minehead	c*	Robert Mansel	Francis Whitworth	Death
1 June 1723	Maidstone	c	Sir Thomas Culpeper	Sir Barnham Rider	Death
3 June 1723	Wilton	u*	Robert Sawyer Herbert	Robert Sawyer Herbert	Groom of the Bedchamber
6 June 1723	Dover	u*	George Berkeley	George Berkeley	Master of St Katharine's Hospital
10 June 1723	King's Lynn	u*	Robert Walpole	Robert Walpole	Secretary of State
11 June 1723	Great Yarmouth	u*	Charles Townshend	William Townshend	Elevated to the House of Lords through a Writ of acceleration
12 June 1723	Hedon	u*	William Pulteney	William Pulteney	Cofferer of the Household
16 January 1724	Rochester	u	Sir Thomas Palmer	Sir Thomas Colby	Death
17 January 1724	Southwark	c	George Meggott	John Lade	Death
18 January 1724	Taunton	c	John Trenchard	Abraham Elton	Death
20 January 1724	Chichester	c*	Earl of March	Lord William Beauclerk	Succeeded to a peerage
20 January 1724	Higham Ferrers	c*	Thomas Watson Wentworth	John Finch	Death
20 January 1724	Old Sarum	u	George Morton Pitt	John Pitt	Resignation (Registrar of the Excise Office)
20 January 1724	West Looe	u*	George Delaval	Edward Trelawny	Death
21 January 1724	East Looe	u*	John Smith	George Cholmondeley	Death
22 January 1724	Castle Rising	u*	William Feilding	The Earl of Mountrath	Death
23 January 1724	Kingston upon Hull	c*	Sir William St Quintin	George Crowle	Death
29 January 1724	Hampshire	u	Lord Nassau Powlett	Lord Nassau Powlett	Auditor General of Revenue in Ireland
4 February 1724	Bere Alston	u	Sir John Hobart	Sir Robert Rich	Chose to sit for St. Ives
5 February 1724	Seaford	u*	Sir Philip Yorke	Sir Philip Yorke	Attorney General for England and Wales
12 February 1724	Lincolnshire	c*	Sir William Massingberd	Robert Vyner	Death
17 February 1724	East Looe	u	William Lowndes	Sir Henry Hoghton	Death
22 February 1724	Christchurch	c	Francis Gwyn	Edward Prideaux Gwyn	Chose to sit for Wells
25 February 1724	Lostwithiel	c*	Marquess of Hartington	Sir Orlando Bridgeman	Chose to sit for Grampound
25 February 1724	Lostwithiel	c	Lord Stanhope	Henry Parsons	Resignation (Captain of the Yeomen of the Guard)
10 March 1724	Helston	u	Sir Robert Raymond	Sir Clement Wearg	Resignation (Puisne Justice of the King's Bench)
16 March 1724	Westbury	c	James Bertie	The Lord Carbery	Chose to sit for Middlesex
7 April 1724	Liverpool	u*	William Cleiveland	Thomas Bootle	Death
10 April 1724	Bridgwater	u*	George Bubb Dodington	George Bubb Dodington	Junior Lord of the Treasury
10 April 1724	Honiton	u*	William Yonge	William Yonge	Junior Lord of the Treasury
16 April 1724	Sussex	u*	Henry Pelham	Henry Pelham	Secretary at War
18 April 1724	Plympton Erle	u*	Richard Edgcumbe	Richard Edgcumbe	Joint Vice-Treasurer of Ireland
18 April 1724	Plympton Erle	u*	George Treby	George Treby	Teller of the Exchequer
21 April 1724	Newark-on-Trent	u*	Richard Sutton	Richard Sutton	Second Clerk Comptroller of the Green Cloth
1 May 1724	Plymouth	u	Pattee Byng	Pattee Byng	Treasurer of the Navy
9 May 1724	Thirsk	u*	Thomas Frankland	Thomas Frankland	Irish Revenue Commissioner
19 November 1724	Bletchingley	c	George Evelyn	Henry Herbert	Death
19 November 1724	Cambridgeshire	c*	Lord Harley	Samuel Shepheard	Succeeded to a peerage
19 November 1724	Stafford	c(*)	John Dolphin	Francis Elde	Death
19 November 1724	Stafford	c(*)	Francis Elde	The Viscount Chetwynd	Elde expelled and by-election results reversed 4 February 1725
20 November 1724	Liverpool	u*	Langham Booth	Thomas Brereton	Death
20 November 1724	Newcastle-under-Lyme	c	Sir Brian Broughton	Sir Walter Wagstaffe Bagot	Death
23 November 1724	Steyning	c	John Gumley	John Gumley	Commissioner General of Musters
27 November 1724	Malton	u*	Sir William Strickland	Henry Finch	Death
11 December 1724	City of London	c	Peter Godfrey	Sir Richard Hopkins	Death
12 December 1724	Ludgershall	u	John Richmond Webb	Anthony Cornish	Death
31 December 1724	Perthshire	u	Lord James Murray	David Graeme	Became a Scottish Peer
4 January 1725	Carmarthen	u	Richard Vaughan	James Phillips	Death
26 January 1725	Reigate	u*	Sir Joseph Jekyll	Sir Joseph Jekyll	First Commissioner of the Great Seal
15 March 1725	Fowey	u	John Goodall	William Bromley	Death
29 March 1725	Launceston	u	Alexander Pendarves	John Freind	Death
1 April 1725	Bury St Edmunds	u	James Reynolds	Lord Hervey	Resignation (Puisne Justice of the King's Bench)
2 April 1725	Cardigan Boroughs	u	Stephen Parry	Thomas Powell	Death
6 April 1725	East Grinstead	u*	John Conyers	Edward Conyers	Death
10 April 1725	Anglesey	c*	The Viscount Bulkeley	Hugh Williams	Death
10 April 1725	Yarmouth	u*	Thomas Stanwix	Maurice Morgan	Death
13 April 1725	Heytesbury	u	Pierce A'Court	Lord Charles Cavendish	Death
16 April 1725	Linlithgow Burghs	c*	Daniel Weir	John Murray	Death
3 June 1725	Brackley	u*	Paul Methuen	Sir Paul Methuen	Treasurer of the Household
5 June 1725	Sandwich	c*	Sir George Oxenden	Sir George Oxenden	Lord of the Admiralty
8 June 1725	Bridgnorth	u*	William Whitmore	St John Charlton	Death
9 June 1725	Bedford	c*	George Huxley	John Thurlow Brace	Victualling Commissioner
14 June 1725	Helston	u	Walter Carey	Walter Carey	Warden of the Mint
14 June 1725	Scarborough	u*	Sir William Strickland	Sir William Strickland	Junior Lord of the Treasury
16 June 1725	Rutland	u*	Lord Finch	Lord Finch	Comptroller of the Household
16 June 1725	York	u*	Edward Thompson	Edward Thompson	Irish Revenue Commissioner
28 June 1725	Bodmin	c	Richard West	Richard West	Lord Chancellor of Ireland
30 June 1725	Inverness Burghs	u*	Duncan Forbes	Duncan Forbes	Lord Advocate
2 July 1725	Dumfriesshire	u*	Charles Erskine	Charles Erskine	Solicitor General for Scotland
26 January 1726	Steyning	u	John Pepper	Marquess of Carnarvon	Death
27 January 1726	Lewes	u	Henry Pelham	Sir Nicholas Pelham	Death
27 January 1726	Tiverton	u	Thomas Bere	George Deane	Death
29 January 1726	West Looe	u*	Edward Trelawny	Edward Trelawny	Victualling Commissioner
31 January 1726	Bodmin	u*	Richard West	John LaRoche	Death
31 January 1726	Droitwich	u*	Edward Jeffreys	Thomas Winnington	Death
1 February 1726	Chipping Wycombe	c(*)	Charles Egerton	Viscount Milsington	Death
1 February 1726	Newport I.o.W.	u*	The Lord Whitworth	George Huxley	Death
1 February 1726	St Mawes	u	Samuel Travers	Samuel Molyneux	Death
8 February 1726	Haverfordwest	u*	Francis Edwardes	Sir Erasmus Philipps	Death
18 February 1726	Newport	u*	Sir Nicholas Morice	Thomas Herbert	Death
3 March 1726	Chipping Wycombe	c(*)	Viscount Milsington	Viscount Milsington	Previous By-election declared void 22 February 1726
3 March 1726	Chipping Wycombe	c(*)	Viscount Milsington	Harry Waller	By-election results reversed on petition 17 March 1726
4 April 1726	Dunwich	u	Sir John Ward	John Sambrooke	Death
9 April 1726	Christchurch	u	Sir Peter Mews	Jacob Banks	Death
28 April 1726	Knaresborough	u*	Richard Arundell	Richard Arundell	Surveyor-General of the King's Works
28 April 1726	Perthshire	c	David Graeme	Mungo Haldane	Death
2 May 1726	Durham City	u*	Charles Talbot	Charles Talbot	Solicitor General for England and Wales
3 May 1726	Shaftesbury	u*	Edward Nicholas	Stephen Fox	Death
6 May 1726	Sudbury	c	William Windham	William Windham	Lieutenant Governor of Chelsea Hospital
11 May 1726	Warwickshire	u*	Robert Digby	Edward Digby	Death
13 May 1726	Helston	u	Sir Clement Wearg	Exton Sayer	Death
14 May 1726	Preston	u*	Daniel Pulteney	Daniel Pulteney	Clerk of the Council in Ireland
21 May 1726	Rye	u*	Phillips Gybbon	Phillips Gybbon	Surveyor General of the Land Revenues of the Crown
30 May 1726	Ipswich	u*	Sir William Thompson	Sir William Thompson	Cursitor Baron of the Exchequer
30 May 1726	Old Sarum	u	Thomas Pitt	George Pitt	Death
31 May 1726	Launceston	u	John Willes	Henry Vane	Second Justice of Chester
31 May 1726	New Windsor	u*	Earl of Burford	Lord Vere Beauclerk	Succeeded to a peerage
1 June 1726	Dartmouth	u	Thomas Martyn	Thomas Martyn	Justice for Caernarvon, Merioneth and Anglesey
1 June 1726	Grampound	u	Marquess of Hartington	Marquess of Hartington	Captain of the Gentlemen Pensioners
9 June 1726	Weymouth and Melcombe Regis	u	John Ward	John Willes	Expulsion following conviction for forgery
16 June 1726	Westmorland	u*	Anthony Lowther	Anthony Lowther	Irish Revenue Commissioner
6 July 1726	Roxburghshire	c	Sir Gilbert Elliot	Sir Gilbert Elliot	Resignation (Lord of Session)
23 January 1727	Hertford	c	Edward Harrison	George Harrison	Resignation (Joint Postmaster General)
25 January 1727	Dorset	c	Thomas Strangways	George Pitt	Death
25 January 1727	Downton	u*	John Verney	John Verney	Second Justice of the Brecon Circuit
25 January 1727	Maldon	u*	John Comyns	Henry Parsons	Resignation (Baron of the Exchequer)
26 January 1727	Lostwithiel	c	Henry Parsons	Sir William Stanhope	Victualling Commissioner
27 January 1727	Fowey	u*	Nicholas Vincent	The Viscount FitzWilliam	Death
27 January 1727	Leicester	u	Lawrence Carter	Thomas Boothby Skrymsher	Resignation (Baron of the Exchequer)
28 January 1727	Petersfield	c(*)	Edmund Miller	Joseph Taylor	Baron of the Exchequer in Scotland
28 January 1727	Petersfield	c(*)	Joseph Taylor	Edmund Miller	By-election results reversed on petition 4 May 1727
30 January 1727	Tamworth	u	Richard Swinfen	George Compton	Death
30 January 1727	Weymouth and Melcombe Regis	u*	Thomas Pearse	Edward Tucker	Resignation (Commissioner of the Navy)
31 January 1727	Cardiff Boroughs	u*	Edward Stradling	Bussy Mansel	Death
31 January 1727	Cockermouth	u*	Thomas Pengelly	William Finch	Resignation (Chief Baron of the Exchequer)
31 January 1727	Newport I.o.W.	u	Charles Cadogan	Sir William Willys	Succeeded to a peerage
1 February 1727	Yorkshire	c*	Sir Arthur Kaye	Cholmley Turner	Death
2 February 1727	Whitchurch	c	Thomas Vernon	Thomas Farrington	Death
6 February 1727	Gloucester	u	John Snell	John Howe	Death
11 February 1727	Ludlow	u*	Acton Baldwyn	Richard Herbert	Death
15 February 1727	Higham Ferrers	u*	John Finch	John Finch	King's Counsel
1 March 1727	Buckingham	u*	Richard Grenville	John Fane	Death
7 April 1727	Whitchurch	u*	John Conduitt	John Conduitt	Master of the Mint
12 April 1727	Surrey	u*	Sir Nicholas Carew	Thomas Scawen	Death
24 April 1727	Steyning	u	Marquess of Carnarvon	William Stanhope	Death
1 May 1727	Lancaster	u*	William Heysham	Christopher Tower	Death
17 May 1727	Horsham	u*	Henry Ingram	Henry Ingram	Commissary General of Stores at Gibraltar
22 May 1727	East Looe	u	Viscount Malpas	Viscount Malpas	Master of the Robes
7 June 1727	Worcestershire	u*	Sir Thomas Lyttelton	Sir Thomas Lyttelton	Lord of the Admiralty
22 June 1727	Elginshire	u*	Alexander Brodie	Alexander Brodie	Lord Lyon King of Arms

=== 7th Parliament (1727–1734) ===
Date	Constituency	c/u	Former Incumbent	Winner	Cause
20 February 1728	Buckingham	u*	Thomas Lewis	George Chamberlayne	Chose to sit for Salisbury
20 February 1728	Queenborough	c*	John Crowley	George Saunders	Death
21 February 1728	Aylesbury	u	William Stanhope	Edward Rudge	Chose to sit for Buckinghamshire
21 February 1728	Guildford	c	Arthur Onslow	Henry Vincent	Chose to sit for Surrey
22 February 1728	Hastings	u*	Thomas Townshend	Thomas Pelham	Chose to sit for Cambridge University
22 February 1728	Hythe	c*	Sir Samuel Lennard	William Glanville	Death
22 February 1728	Sussex	u*	Spencer Compton	James Butler	Elevated to the peerage
23 February 1728	Amersham	u*	Baptist Leveson-Gower	Thomas Lutwyche	Chose to sit for Newcastle-under-Lyme
24 February 1728	Tavistock	u	Sir John Cope	Sir Humphrey Monoux	Chose to sit for Hampshire
28 February 1728	Milborne Port	u	Thomas Medlycott	Thomas Medlycott	Irish Revenue Commissioner
28 February 1728	Winchelsea	u	John Scrope	Sir Archer Croft	Chose to sit for Bristol
29 February 1728	Lostwithiel	u*	Sir Orlando Bridgeman	Anthony Cracherode	Chose to sit for Bletchingley
29 February 1728	Lostwithiel	u*	Darell Trelawny	Sir Edward Knatchbull	Death
29 February 1728	Plympton Erle	u	George Treby	John Fuller	Chose to sit for Dartmouth
1 March 1728	Old Sarum	u	Thomas Pitt	Matthew St Quintin	Chose to sit for Okehampton
1 March 1728	Plymouth	u*	George Treby	Robert Byng	Chose to sit for Dartmouth
1 March 1728	Tiverton	u	Sir William Yonge	James Nelthorpe	Chose to sit for Honiton
2 March 1728	Bere Alston	u*	Sir Francis Henry Drake	Sir Archer Croft	Chose to sit for Tavistock
2 March 1728	Bere Alston	u	Sir John Hobart	Lord Walden	Chose to sit for Norfolk
2 March 1728	Bramber	c	Sir Richard Gough	John Gumley	Death
2 March 1728	Bramber	c	John Gumley	James Hoste	By-election result reversed on petition 4 April 1728
2 March 1728	St Mawes	u	John Knight	William East	Chose to sit for Sudbury
4 March 1728	Rutland	u*	John Noel	Thomas Noel	Death
16 March 1728	Elgin Burghs	u	William Steuart	Patrick Campbell	Chose to sit for Ayr Burghs
16 March 1728	Stirling Burghs	u*	Henry Cunningham	Lord Erskine	Chose to sit for Stirlingshire
16 March 1728	Wigtown Burghs	u	William Dalrymple	John Dalrymple	Chose to sit for Wigtownshire
18 March 1728	Wendover	c	Richard Hampden	John Hamilton	Chose to sit for Buckinghamshire
23 April 1728	Winchelsea	u	Sir Archer Croft	Peter Walter	Chose to sit for Bere Alston
13 May 1728	New Romney	u*	Sir Robert Furnese	David Papillon	Chose to sit for Kent
16 May 1728	Amersham	c	Montague Garrard Drake	Marmaduke Alington	Death
22 May 1728	Peterborough	u	Sidney Wortley Montagu	Joseph Banks	Death
25 May 1728	Exeter	u	Samuel Molyneux	John Belfield	Death
30 May 1728	Old Sarum	u	The Earl of Londonderry	Thomas Harrison	Resignation (Governor of the Leeward Islands)
3 June 1728	Malmesbury	u*	Giles Earle	Giles Earle	Irish Revenue Commissioner
5 June 1728	Lincoln	c	Sir John Monson	Sir John Tyrwhitt	Elevated to the peerage
6 June 1728	Honiton	u*	Sir William Yonge	Sir William Yonge	Lord of the Admiralty
6 June 1728	Thirsk	u*	Sir Thomas Frankland	Sir Thomas Frankland	Lord of Trade
19 June 1728	Yorkshire	u	Sir Thomas Watson Wentworth	Sir George Savile	Elevated to the peerage
26 June 1728	Norfolk	u	Sir Thomas Coke	Harbord Harbord	Elevated to the peerage
26 June 1728	Norfolk	u*	Sir John Hobart	Sir Edmund Bacon	Elevated to the peerage
16 July 1728	Roxburghshire	u	William Douglas	William Douglas	Keeper of Register of Hornings
27 January 1729	Queenborough	c*	Sprig Manesty	Richard Evans	Death
29 January 1729	Buckinghamshire	u*	Richard Hampden	Sir Thomas Lee	Death
29 January 1729	Lyme Regis	c*	Henry Holt Henley	Henry Holt Henley	Clerk of the Pipe
29 January 1729	Peterborough	u	The Earl FitzWilliam	Charles Gounter Nicoll	Death
29 January 1729	New Shoreham	u	Francis Chamberlayne	Samuel Ongley	Death
29 January 1729	New Shoreham	u	Sir Nathaniel Gould	John Gould	Death
31 January 1729	Chichester	u	Charles Lumley	James Lumley	Death
31 January 1729	Orford	u	Price Devereux	William Acton	Chose to sit for Montgomeryshire
1 February 1729	Midhurst	u	The Viscount Midleton	Sir Richard Mill	Death
6 February 1729	Tregony	u	Thomas Smith	Matthew Ducie Moreton	Death
12 February 1729	Wareham	u	Joseph Gascoigne	Nathaniel Gould	Death
26 February 1729	Wareham	u	Sir Edward Ernle	Thomas Tower	Death
27 February 1729	West Looe	u*	John Willes	John Willes	Chief Justice of Chester
3 March 1729	Aldborough	u*	William Jessop	William Jessop	Puisne Justice of Chester
13 March 1729	Dorchester	u*	William Chapple	William Chapple	Chief Justice of Carnarvon, Merioneth and Anglesey
25 March 1729	Cromartyshire	u	Sir Kenneth Mackenzie	Sir George Mackenzie	Death
8 April 1729	Pontefract	u*	Sir William Lowther	Sir William Lowther	Death
12 April 1729	Wiltshire	u*	Sir James Long	John Howe	Death
1 May 1729	Cardigan Boroughs	c(*)	Francis Cornwallis	Richard Lloyd	Death (Two MPs Elected due to Double Return)
1 May 1729	Cardigan Boroughs	c(*)	Francis Cornwallis	Thomas Powell	Death (Two MPs Elected due to Double Return)
1 May 1729	Cardigan Boroughs	c*	Thomas Powell	Richard Lloyd	Lloyd declared elected 7 May 1730
1 May 1729	Cardigan Boroughs	c*	Richard Lloyd	Richard Lloyd	Lloyd declared elected 7 May 1730
13 May 1729	Lymington	c	Anthony Morgan	William Powlett	Death
22 May 1729	Malton	u*	Henry Finch	Henry Finch	Receiver General of Revenues of Minorca
28 May 1729	Liverpool	c	Thomas Brereton	Sir Thomas Aston	Victualling Commissioner
29 May 1729	Dartmouth	u*	Walter Carey	Walter Carey	Clerk of the Privy Council
29 May 1729	Southampton	u*	Robert Eyre	William Heathcote	Resignation (Commissioner of Excise)
2 June 1729	Newport (I.o.W.)	u*	George Huxley	George Huxley	Muster-Master General
1 July 1729	Lanarkshire	u	Lord Archibald Hamilton	Lord Archibald Hamilton	Naval Lord
5 August 1729	Stirling Burghs	u	Lord Erskine	Lord Erskine	Accepted a Commission in the Army
20 January 1730	Andover	u*	Viscount Milsington	William Guidott	Became a Scottish Peer
21 January 1730	Banbury	c	Francis North	Toby Chauncy	Succeeded to a peerage
22 January 1730	Boston	c	Henry Pacey	The Lord Coleraine	Death
23 January 1730	Southwark	c*	Edmund Halsey	Thomas Inwen	Death
24 January 1730	Appleby	u*	Sackville Tufton	Walter Plumer	Succeeded to a peerage
26 January 1730	Durham City	c*	Robert Shafto	John Shafto	Death
26 January 1730	Scarborough	u*	John Hungerford	William Thompson	Death
26 January 1730	Winchester	c	Lord William Powlett	Norton Powlett	Death
27 January 1730	Ipswich	c	William Thompson	Philip Broke	Resignation (Baron of the Exchequer)
30 January 1730	Weobley	c	John Birch	John Birch	Cursitor Baron of the Exchequer
3 February 1730	Derby	u*	William Stanhope	Charles Stanhope	Elevated to the peerage
7 February 1730	Huntingdonshire	c*	Marquess of Hartington	Robert Piggott	Succeeded to a peerage
7 February 1730	Pontefract	u	John Lowther	John Mordaunt	Death
13 February 1730	Aylesbury	c	Philip Lloyd	Thomas Ingoldsby	Equerry to the King
13 February 1730	Selkirkshire	u*	John Pringle	James Rutherford	Resignation (Lord of Session)
18 February 1730	Rutland	c	Lord Finch	William Burton	Succeeded to a peerage
20 February 1730	Bridport	u	James Pelham	John Jewkes	Chose to sit for Newark
23 February 1730	Orford	u	Dudley North	Robert Kemp	Death
23 March 1730	St Albans	c	Caleb Lomax	Thomas Gape	Death
25 March 1730	Beaumaris	u*	Watkin Williams Wynn	The Viscount Bulkeley	Chose to sit for Denbighshire
29 April 1730	Lostwithiel	u*	Sir Edward Knatchbull	Edward Walpole	Death
7 May 1730	Orkney and Shetland	u	George Douglas	Robert Douglas	Became a Scottish Peer
8 May 1730	Aldeburgh	u	William Windham	Sir John Williams	Death
14 May 1730	Honiton	u*	Sir William Yonge	Sir William Yonge	Junior Lord of the Treasury
14 May 1730	Great Yarmouth	c	Horatio Walpole	Horatio Walpole	Cofferer of the Household
16 May 1730	Bury St Edmunds	u	Lord Hervey	Lord Hervey	Vice-Chamberlain of the Household
16 May 1730	Bury St Edmunds	u*	Thomas Norton	Thomas Norton	Deputy Governor of Chelsea Hospital
18 May 1730	King's Lynn	u*	Sir Charles Turner	Sir Charles Turner	Teller of the Exchequer
20 May 1730	Totnes	u	Exton Sayer	Exton Sayer	Surveyor General of the Land Revenues of the Crown
20 May 1730	Weymouth and Melcombe Regis	c*	William Betts	George Dodington	Void Election
21 May 1730	Dartmouth	u*	George Treby	George Treby	Master of the Household
21 May 1730	Northamptonshire	c*	Sir Justinian Isham	Sir Justinian Isham	Death
21 May 1730	Sussex	u*	Henry Pelham	Henry Pelham	Paymaster of the Forces
22 May 1730	Scarborough	u*	Sir William Strickland	Sir William Strickland	Secretary at War
26 May 1730	Droitwich	u*	Thomas Winnington	Thomas Winnington	Lord of the Admiralty
26 May 1730	Andover	u*	James Brudenell	James Brudenell	Lord of Trade
27 May 1730	Newport (I.o.W.)	u*	William Fortescue	William Fortescue	King's Counsel
29 May 1730	Richmond	u*	Sir Conyers Darcy	Sir Conyers Darcy	Comptroller of the Household
30 May 1730	Thirsk	u*	Sir Thomas Frankland	Sir Thomas Frankland	Lord of the Admiralty
2 June 1730	Devon	u*	John Rolle	Henry Rolle	Death
22 June 1730	Bere Alston	u	Sir Archer Croft	Sir Archer Croft	Lord of Trade
27 January 1731	Chipping Wycombe	u*	William Lee	Sir Charles Vernon	Resignation (Justice of the King's Bench)
30 January 1731	Bedford	c*	James Metcalfe	Sir Jeremy Sambrooke	Death
31 January 1731	Grampound	u	Humphry Morice	Isaac le Heup	Death
5 February 1731	Bridgwater	u*	Sir Halswell Tynte	Thomas Palmer	Death
9 February 1731	Yarmouth	u	Maurice Morgan	Maurice Morgan	Lieutenant Governor of the Isle of Wight
25 March 1731	Bossiney	c	Robert Corker	James Cholmondeley	Death
3 May 1731	Rochester	u*	David Polhill	David Polhill	Keeper of the Records in the Tower of London
5 May 1731	Berkshire	u*	Robert Packer	Winchcombe Howard Packer	Death
14 May 1731	Great Marlow	c	John Clavering	George Robinson	Resignation (Groom of the Bedchamber)
17 May 1731	Knaresborough	u*	Richard Arundell	Richard Arundell	Surveyor of the King's Private Roads
17 May 1731	Monmouthshire	u	William Morgan	Lord Charles Noel Somerset	Death
19 May 1731	Malton	u*	Wardell George Westby	Sir William Wentworth	Resignation (Commissioner of Customs)
20 May 1731	Lichfield	u*	Walter Chetwynd	George Venables Vernon	Resignation (Governor of Barbados)
4 June 1731	Ayr Burghs	u	William Steuart	William Steuart	Paymaster of Pensions
21 January 1732	Aldeburgh	u*	Samuel Lowe	George Purvis	Death
21 January 1732	Plymouth	u*	Robert Byng	Robert Byng	Commissioner of the Navy
22 January 1732	Christchurch	c	Charles Wither	Philip Lloyd	Death
22 January 1732	New Woodstock	u*	Marquess of Blandford	John Spencer	Death
24 January 1732	Preston	c*	Daniel Pulteney	Nicholas Fazakerley	Death
25 January 1732	Totnes	c	Exton Sayer	Sir Henry Gough	Death
9 February 1732	Suffolk	u*	Sir William Barker	Sir Robert Kemp	Death
26 February 1732	Oxford University	u*	William Bromley	Viscount Cornbury	Death
8 April 1732	Great Marlow	c*	George Robinson	Sir Thomas Hoby	Expulsion
14 April 1732	Weobley	c	John Birch	James Cornewall	Expulsion
15 April 1732	Droitwich	u*	Richard Foley	Edward Foley	Death
15 April 1732	Minehead	u*	Francis Whitworth	Francis Whitworth	Surveyor General of Woods, Forests, Parks, and Chases
26 April 1732	Poole	u*	Denis Bond	Thomas Wyndham	Expulsion
28 April 1732	Peeblesshire	c*	John Douglas	Sir James Nasmyth	Death
29 April 1732	Great Bedwyn	u	Sir William Willys	Francis Seymour	Death
15 May 1732	New Windsor	u*	Lord Vere Beauclerk	Lord Vere Beauclerk	Commissioner of the Navy
30 May 1732	Nottinghamshire	u*	Sir Robert Sutton	Thomas Bennett	Expulsion
30 May 1732	Nottinghamshire	u*	The Viscount Howe	William Levinz	Resignation (Governor of Barbados)
15 June 1732	Liskeard	u	Thomas Clutterbuck	Thomas Clutterbuck	Lord of the Admiralty
13 July 1732	Aberdeenshire	u*	Sir Archibald Grant	Sir Arthur Forbes	Expelled due to his role in the Charitable Corporation
23 January 1733	Northampton	u	Edward Montagu	Edward Montagu	Governor of Kingston upon Hull
23 January 1733	Rye	u	John Norris	Matthew Norris	Resignation (Usher of the Customs House in the Port of London)
23 January 1733	St Albans	c	Thomas Gape	John Merrill	Death
24 January 1733	Chester	c*	Sir Richard Grosvenor	Robert Grosvenor	Death
25 January 1733	Brackley	u*	William Egerton	George Lee	Death
26 January 1733	East Retford	u*	Thomas White	John White	Death
26 January 1733	West Looe	u*	Edward Trelawny	Thomas Walker	Resignation (Commissioner of Customs in Scotland)
29 January 1733	Ipswich	u*	Francis Negus	William Wollaston	Death
29 January 1733	St Germans	u	Sidney Godolphin	Richard Eliot	Death
1 February 1733	Bath	u*	George Wade	George Wade	Governor of Berwick-upon-Tweed
1 February 1733	Thetford	u*	Robert Jacomb	Charles FitzRoy	Death
9 February 1733	Bodmin	u*	Robert Booth	Sir John Heathcote	Death
15 February 1733	Ross-shire	u	Charles Ross	John Munro	Death
16 February 1733	Bedfordshire	u	Pattee Byng	Charles Leigh	Succeeded to a peerage
1 March 1733	Forfarshire	u	James Scott	Robert Scott	Death
7 March 1733	Kingston upon Hull	u*	George Crowle	George Crowle	Victualling Commissioner
13 March 1733	Chichester	c	Lord William Beauclerk	Sir Thomas Prendergast	Death
21 March 1733	Chester	c*	Sir Thomas Grosvenor	Sir Charles Bunbury	Death
1 March 1733	St Germans	u*	Sir Gilbert Heathcote	Dudley Ryder	Death
2 April 1733	Kent	u*	Sir Robert Furnese	Sir Edward Dering	Death
9 April 1733	Banbury	u*	Toby Chauncy	William Knollys	Death
27 April 1733	Denbigh Boroughs	u*	Robert Myddelton	John Myddelton	Death
16 May 1733	New Windsor	u*	Viscount Malpas	Lord Sidney Beauclerk	Succeeded to a peerage
17 May 1733	Yarmouth	u	Maurice Morgan	Maurice Bocland	Death
22 May 1733	Malmesbury	u*	William Rawlinson Earle	William Rawlinson Earle	Clerk of the Deliveries of the Ordnance
29 May 1733	Northallerton	u*	Leonard Smelt	Leonard Smelt	Clerk of the Ordnance
11 June 1733	Mitchell	u	Thomas Farrington	Thomas Farrington	Auditor of the Land Revenues for Wales
25 June 1733	Andover	u	James Brudenell	James Brudenell	Groom of the Bedchamber
27 June 1733	Bury St Edmunds	u	Lord Hervey	Thomas Hervey	Elevated to the House of Lords through a Writ of acceleration
4 July 1733	Hampshire	u*	Lord Harry Powlett	Lord Harry Powlett	Naval Lord
3 August 1733	Selkirkshire	u	James Rutherford	James Rutherford	Commissary of Peebles
25 January 1734	Durham City	u*	Charles Talbot	Henry Lambton	Appointed Lord Chancellor
25 January 1734	Seaford	u*	Philip Yorke	William Hay	Appointed Lord Chief Justice of England and Wales and elevated to the peerage
26 January 1734	Downton	u	John Verney	John Verney	Chief Justice of Chester
28 January 1734	St Germans	u*	Dudley Ryder	Dudley Ryder	Solicitor General for England and Wales
28 January 1734	West Looe	u*	John Willes	John Willes	Attorney General for England and Wales
29 January 1734	Peterborough	u*	Charles Gounter Nicoll	Armstead Parker	Death
31 January 1734	Sudbury	c	John Knight	Richard Jackson	Death
5 February 1734	Bere Alston	u	Lord Walden	William Morden	Succeeded to a peerage
5 February 1734	Leicestershire	u*	Sir Clobery Noel	Ambrose Phillipps	Death
6 February 1734	Berkshire	u*	Sir John Stonhouse	William Archer	Death
6 February 1734	Kingston upon Hull	u*	The Viscount Micklethwaite	Henry Maister	Death
6 February 1734	Saltash	u*	Edward Hughes	Thomas Corbett	Death
6 February 1734	Warwickshire	u*	William Peyto	Sir Charles Mordaunt	Death
15 February 1734	Sutherland	u*	Lord Strathnaver	Sir James Fergusson	Became a Scottish Peer
