= John Vaughan, 2nd Viscount Lisburne =

Welsh landowner and Whig politician

John Vaughan, 2nd Viscount Lisburne (c.1695 – 15 January 1741) was a Welsh landowner and Whig politician who sat in the British House of Commons from 1727 to 1734. Apparently a heavy drinker, who kept several mistresses, he informally separated from his second wife in 1729 after she had an affair with his land agent. His spending badly impaired the financial soundness of his estate, and his brother and successor had to contend with the claims of Lisburne's wife's son on the estate.

== Family life ==
Vaughan was the eldest son of John Vaughan, 1st Viscount Lisburne, who was ennobled in the Irish peerage around the time of the younger John's birth. His mother was Lady Malet Wilmot, daughter of John Wilmot, 2nd Earl of Rochester. Vaughan appears to have led a dissipated life even before succeeding his father to his estates in 1721. He married Anne Bennet, daughter of Sir John Bennett. She died on 31 July 1723, shortly before her father, without children. He also had a number of mistresses.

During the Christmas season of 1724/5, Lisburne was staying with various gentry in the Severn valley. He and many of the other guests were drinking freely to celebrate the season. Invited to a concert hosted by Sir John Pryce, 5th Baronet, Lisburne was observed to be paying attention to Dorothy, the daughter of Captain Richard Hill. (Note: She is often erroneously said to have been the widow of one Waller, of Cardiganshire. Her father was a friend of Charles Mohun, 4th Baron Mohun and helped him ambush and kill William Mountfort.) Lady Pryce, worried about the possible consequences, sent Dorothy and her sister back to their father's house at Henblas. Later that day, Captain Hill invited Lisburne to Henblas and encouraged him to drink heavily; he awoke in confusion and attempted to leave the next morning, but was persuaded by Dorothy to stay. Further drinking ensued, and Hill convinced Lisburne to marry his daughter, who was much below him in fortune and social station. The ceremony took place on 10 January 1725.

Witnesses in later years disagreed on their behavior towards each other, but the first few years of their marriage seem to have been more or less orderly. Lisburne settled a jointure of £400 on his wife, charged on the Trawsgoed estate, and in 1727, she gave birth to a daughter, Malet. In that year, he left for London to take up a seat in the House of Commons and does not appear to have returned to Wales for two years, while his wife and daughter remained there. In 1729, the vicar of Llanfihangel y Creuddyn wrote to him to tell him that his wife was suspected of an affair with her brother-in-law, David Lloyd, Lisburne's land agent. Lisburne rather leisurely returned from London by way of Montgomeryshire, in the company of his sister Letitia and his current mistress, Mrs. Phillips, one of Letitia's servants. After several weeks of conflict, Dorothy declared her intention of returning to her father at Henblas; Lisburne provided her with horses, and she left his estate and her daughter behind. Lisburne apparently considered a divorce, but this would have been extremely expensive and difficult at the time. There was no formal separation, but they did not see each other, and when Dorothy became pregnant in 1733, the father was believed to be either Lloyd, or Edward Glynne of Glynne, although the son she bore was baptised as Edward Vaughan.

Lisburne had shunned his wife, but still kept mistresses; reportedly robbed of plate and valuables in Dublin by one of his Irish mistresses, Mrs. Roach, he thereafter took up with a Mrs. Anne Savage, who "lived with him like a wife to his death". He had a natural son by her, named John Vaughan. In his will of May 1740, he left a bequest of up to £500 for John's maintenance, and his property in Ireland and some other goods to Anne, while his estates in Great Britain were to go to his brother Wilmot. Two natural daughters, Mary and Jane, were left £10 each to be apprenticed. Malet was to receive £3000 if she obeyed her guardian, her uncle Wilmot. However, a second will of January 1741 removed the bequest to Malet (who was otherwise provided for); Anne would receive £800 for the maintenance of their son, Mary and Jane £60 each, and all his goods were to go to Wilmot. Upon Lisburne's death in 1741, Wilmot immediately took possession of the estate and notified the tenants not to accept the claims of Dorothy and her son Edward. After extensive litigation, Dorothy obtained payment of her jointure from Wilmot, who made a great deal of difficulty; the estate was mortgaged and yielded only £1000 per year, and was also charged with a provision for Malet. Dorothy and Edward spent several years pursuing litigation to have him recognized as the rightful Viscount, but in 1754, just before it would have gone to trial, they settled with Wilmot and dropped all claims to the estate in exchange for an annuity.

== Politics ==
Vaughan succeeded his father as Viscount Lisburne in 1721, and was also appointed his successor as Lord Lieutenant and Custos Rotulorum of Cardiganshire. Lisburne's father had been a Whig, and zealous in defending Cardiganshire during the Jacobite rising of 1715, and Lisburne followed his lead in politics. At the 1727 British general election, the sitting member for Cardiganshire was Francis Cornwallis, a Tory supported by the interests of the Pryses of Gogerddan and the Powells of Nanteos. He switched to stand for Cardigan, and the Tories put up Thomas Powell, then sitting for Cardigan, for the county. The Pryse interest was hindered by the minority of Thomas Pryse, head of the family, and Lisburne defeated Powell to take the Cardiganshire seat. In Parliament, Lisburne supported Robert Walpole's administration on the proposed excise tax in 1733 and in opposing the attempt to repeal the Septennial Act in 1734. He did not stand for Parliament again in 1734. In 1737, he was prosecuted by HM Treasury for rent owed on Crown estates, but the prosecution was suspended in the following year. Lisburne died on 15 January 1741 and was succeeded by his brother Wilmot. His natural daughter Elizabeth married Thomas Newton, Bishop of Bristol.

== Citations ==
Parliament of Great Britain
| Preceded by Francis Cornwallis | Member of Parliament for Cardiganshire; 1727–1734 | Succeeded by Walter Lloyd |
Honorary titles
| Preceded by The 1st Viscount Lisburne | Lord Lieutenant of Cardiganshire; 1721–1741 | Vacant Title next held by The 3rd Viscount Lisburne |
| Preceded by The 1st Viscount Lisburne | Custos Rotulorum of Cardiganshire; 1721–1741 | Vacant Title next held by Thomas Johnes |
Peerage of Ireland
| Preceded by John Vaughan | Viscount Lisburne; 1721–1741 | Succeeded by Wilmot Vaughan |
