= Walter Lloyd (1678–1747) =

British politician

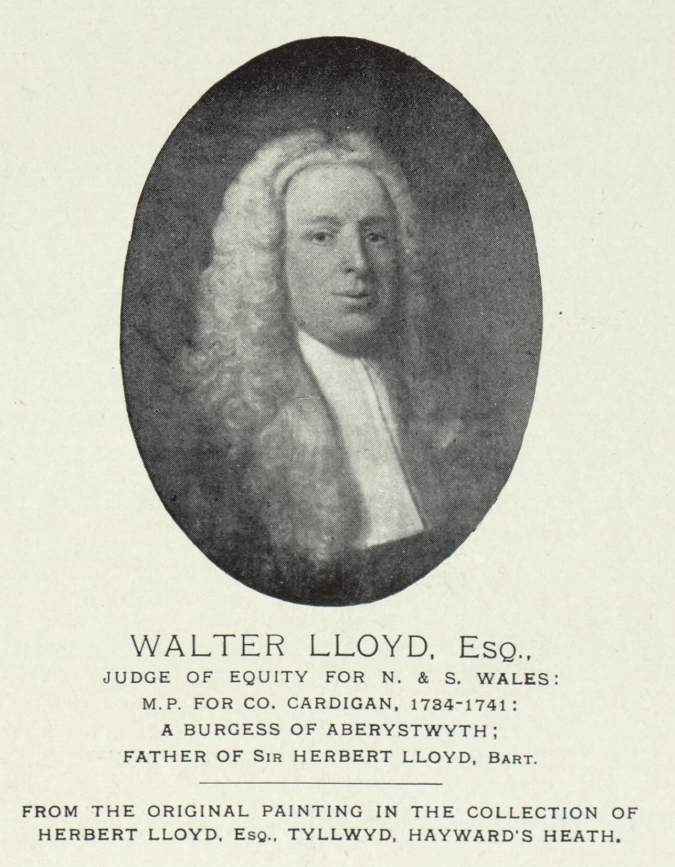
Walter Lloyd

Walter Lloyd (c. 1678–1747), of Peterwell, Cardiganshire, was a British lawyer and Whig politician who sat in the House of Commons from 1734 to 1742.

Lloyd was the son of David Lloyd of Voelallt, Cardiganshire. He was admitted at Inner Temple in 1695 and matriculated at Brasenose College, Oxford on 6 July 1697, aged 19. He was called to the bar in 1700 and was mayor of Cardigan in 1710 and 1711. He married Elizabeth Evans, daughter of Daniel Evans of Peterwell in about 1713, which established the Lloyds as a political power in Cardiganshire since the Peterwell estate gave him control of Lampeter, and an electoral interest in the county. He was Mayor of Cardigan again in 1714. In 1715 he was appointed Attorney-general for South Wales. He was twice more mayor of Cardigan in 1718 and 1721. He became a bencher of his Inn in 1725.

Lloyd was returned unopposed as Whig Member of Parliament for Cardiganshire at the 1734 British general election. At 1741 British general election, he was returned in a contest, but was aided by the partisan conduct of a Whig sheriff. He supported Walpole’s Administration until Walpole’s fall in 1742, when he was unseated on petition by the anti-Walpole majority in the House of Commons on 22 March 1742. He stood unsuccessfully for Cardigan Boroughs at a by-election in 1746,.

Lloyd died in February 1747 leaving five sons and four daughters. He was succeeded by his eldest son John, who was MP for Cardiganshire. His second son Herbert was the first of the Lloyd baronets.

Parliament of Great Britain
Preceded by John Vaughan, 2nd Viscount Lisburne	Member of Parliament for Cardiganshire; 1734–1742	Succeeded by Thomas Powell
