= John Lloyd (Cardiganshire) =

British Member of Parliament

John Lloyd (c. 1717 – 1755) of Peterwell, Cardiganshire, was a British lawyer and Whig politician who sat in the House of Commons from 1747 to 1755.

Lloyd was the son of Walter Lloyd of Peterwell, Cardiganshire and his wife Elizabeth Evans, daughter of Daniel Evans of Peterwell. He was admitted at Inner Temple in 1735 and matriculated at Jesus College, Oxford on 16 April 1735, aged 17. He was called to the bar in 1739. In 1747 he succeeded his father to Peterswell. He married Elizabeth Le Heup, daughter of Isaac le Heup, of Gunthorpe, Norfolk on 24 March 1750. He succeeded his brother-in-law Sir Lucius C. Lloyd, 3rd Baronet to Maesyfelin, Cardiganshire in 1750.

Lloyd succeeded his father to the post of Attorney-general for South Wales in 1747. He was also returned unopposed as Whig Member of Parliament for Cardiganshire at the 1747 British general election. At the 1754 British general election, he was returned unopposed as MP for Cardiganshire on the Whig interest, through a compromise by which the Tories were returned for Cardigan Boroughs.

Lloyd was a close friend of Thomas Johnes, and other friends included Henry Fox, Richard Rigby and Sir Charles Hanbury Williams. He died without issue on 3 June 1755 and was buried at Lampeter. He was succeeded by his brother Herbert, the first of the Lloyd baronets.

Parliament of Great Britain
| Preceded by Thomas Powell | Member of Parliament for Cardiganshire; 1747–1755 | Succeeded by Hon. Wilmot Vaughan |
