= Overbury (surname) =

Overbury is an English language surname shared by these notable persons:

- Mary Anstie Overbury (c. 1851–1926), artist, designer and teacher of art in South Australia
- Sir Nicholas Overbury (1551–1643), English lawyer, landowner and politician who sat in the House of Commons 1604–1611
- Sir Thomas Overbury (c. 1580–1613), son of Sir Nicholas, English lawyer, poet and essayist, victim of murder which led to a scandalous trial
- Walter Overbury (1592–1637), son of Sir Nicholas, English politician who sat in the House of Commons at various times between 1621 and 1626
