= John Vaughan, 1st Viscount Lisburne =

Welsh nobleman

The Viscount Lisburne
- Born: Cardiganshire, Wales
- Resting place: Llanafan church
- Title: 1st Viscount Lisburne
- Spouse: Malet Wilmot
- Children: John, Wilmont, Henry, Anne, Elizabeth, Letita
- Parent(s): Edward Vaughan (MP), Letitia Hooker

John Vaughan, 1st Viscount Lisburne (7 December 1667 – 20 March 1721), of Trawsgoed, Cardiganshire, was a Welsh nobleman.

== Biography ==
The son of Edward Vaughan and grandson of Sir John Vaughan, he was created Baron Fethard and Viscount Lisburne, in the Peerage of Ireland, on 5 June 1695. He represented Cardiganshire in the House of Commons from 1694 to 1698. He was Colonel of the Cardiganshire Militia in 1697.

Vaughan married his first wife, Lady Malet Wilmot (d. 1709), daughter of John Wilmot, 2nd Earl of Rochester, on 18 August 1692. They had six children:

- John Vaughan, 2nd Viscount Lisburne (c.1695–1741)
- Wilmot Vaughan, 3rd Viscount Lisburne (d. 1766)
- Hon. Henry Vaughan, died unmarried
- Lady Anne Vaughan, married Sir John Prideaux, 6th Baronet
- Lady Elizabeth Vaughan
- Lady Letitia Vaughan

== Sources ==
- The parliamentary history of the principality of Wales, 1541-1895
- National Library of Wales
- Morgan, Gerald, "The Vaughans of Trawsgoed," Gomer, 1997, ISBN 1-85902-472-6
- The Peerage of the United Kingdom of Great Britain & Ireland, John Debrett, Published 1809

Parliament of England
Preceded by Sir Carbery Pryse, Bt	Member of Parliament for Cardiganshire; 1694–1698	Succeeded by John Lewis
Honorary titles
Preceded by The Viscount Hereford	Custos Rotulorum of Cardiganshire; 1714–1721	Succeeded by The Viscount Lisburne
Preceded by The Earl of Pembroke	Lord Lieutenant of Cardiganshire; 1715–1721	Succeeded by The Viscount Lisburne
Peerage of Ireland
New creation	Viscount Lisburne; 1695–1721	Succeeded by John Vaughan
