= Sir George Barlow, 2nd Baronet =

British landowner and politician

Sir George Barlow 2nd Baronet (c. 1680–1726) of Slebech, Pembrokeshire was a British landowner and politician who sat in the House of Commons from 1713 to 1715.

Barlow was the eldest son of Sir John Barlow, 1st Baronet of Slebech and his second wife Catherine Middleton, daughter of Christopher Middleton of Middleton Hall, Carmarthenshire. He was from a South Wales Catholic family with Jacobite and High Tory sentiments. He married Winifred Heneage, daughter of George Heneage of Hainton Hall, Lincolnshire on 31 May 1695 and succeeded his father in the baronetcy when his will was proved on 27 June 1695. The marriage brought him lands, but the young Lady Barlow eloped from her husband after their only child was born.

Barlow was included in the Commission of the Peace for Pembrokeshire in 1701. At the 1713 general election, he was brought in by the Jacobite Lewis Pryse as Member of Parliament for Cardigan Boroughs. He stood unsuccessfully for Pembroke Boroughs at the 1715 general election and was returned as MP for Haverfordwest at a by-election on 3 May 1715, only to be unseated on petition two months later on 4 July.

Barlow died in 1726, and was succeeded in the baronetcy by his son George. He made over a large part of his estates to his brother John.

Parliament of Great Britain
Preceded by Owen Brigstocke	Member of Parliament for Cardigan Boroughs; 1713–1715	Succeeded by Stephen Parry
Preceded by John Laugharne	Member of Parliament for Haverfordwest; 1715	Succeeded by John Barlow
Baronetage of England
Preceded by John Barlow	Baronet (of Slebech); 1695-1726	Succeeded by George Barlow
