= William Bradshaw (MP) =

William Bradshaw was a Welsh politician who sat in the House of Commons from 1604 to 1611.

Bradshaw was the eldest or only son of John Bradshaw of Presteign, Radnorshire. In 1604, he was an Alderman of Cardigan. He was elected Member of Parliament for Cardigan and was seated on petition on 13 April 1604.

Parliament of England
Preceded by William Aubrey; Richard Delabere	Member of Parliament for Cardigan; 1604	Succeeded by Robert Wolverstone
