= Robert Wolverstone =

Robert Wolverstone (1572/3–1624) was a Welsh politician who sat in the House of Commons in 1614.

In 1614, Wolverstone was elected member of parliament for Cardigan.

Wolverstone was probably the father or brother of Captain Charles Wolverstone, Governor of Barbados from 1625 to 1629.

Parliament of England
Preceded by William Bradshaw	Member of Parliament for Cardigan; 1614	Succeeded by Walter Overbury
