= Rowland Pugh =

Welsh politician

Rowland Pugh (born 1579, date of death unknown) was a Welsh politician who sat in the House of Commons from 1624 to 1625.

Pugh was the eldest son of Richard ap John ap Hugh, of Mathafarn, Montgomeryshire. He matriculated at Jesus College, Oxford on 14 October 1597, aged 18. He became a student of the Inner Temple in November 1598.

In 1624, Pugh was elected Member of Parliament for Cardigan. He was re-elected MP for Cardigan in 1625. He was Steward of Cyperley near Machynlleth. In 1608 and 1625 he was appointed High Sheriff of Montgomeryshire. He was High Sheriff of Merionethshire and High Sheriff of Cardiganshire in 1631.

Pugh married firstly Elizabeth Pryse, daughter of Sir Richard Pryse of Gogerddan and secondly Mary Lewes daughter of James Lewis of Coedmawr.

Parliament of England
Preceded by Walter Overbury	Member of Parliament for Cardigan; 1624–1625	Succeeded by Walter Overbury
