= Francis Cornwallis =

Welsh Tory politician

Francis Cornwallis (c. 1692–1728) of Abermarlais, was a Welsh Tory politician who sat in the House of Commons from 1722 to 1728.

Cornwallis was the only son of Thomas Cornwallis of Abermarlais, Carmarthenshire, and his wife Emma Charlton, daughter of Sir Job Charlton, 1st Baronet, MP of Ludford, Herefordshire and his second wife Letitia Waring. His father died in 1703 and he succeeded to his estate. His mother remarried John Robinson, Bishop of London. The bishop died in 1723; Emma lived until 1748.

He was admitted at Lincoln's Inn in 1706, studied at Eton College in 1707 and matriculated at University College, Oxford on 19 April 1711, aged 18. He married Jane Crowe, daughter of Sir Sackville Crowe, 2nd Baronet of Laugharne, Carmarthenshire.

Cornwallis stood for Cardiganshire at the 1722 general election at the suggestion of Lewis Pryse and William Powell of Nanteos, joint leaders of the Cardiganshire Tories, and he was returned unopposed as Member of Parliament for the seat. At the 1727 general election he transferred to Cardigan Boroughs and was returned unopposed. He was a member of the society of Sea Serjeants, which was said to be a South Wales Jacobite organization.

Cornwallis died without issue on 19 August 1728 after falling from his horse in Abermarlais Park. His estate went to his four sisters, the eldest of whom, Letitia, gave hers away in charity. Another sister Elizabeth married the Irish politician and landowner Sir Robert Maude, 1st Baronet.

Cornwallis was described in his obituary as 'hospitable, obliging and beneficent; a lover of virtue without ostentation, and of mirth without vice'.

Parliament of Great Britain
Preceded by Owen Brigstocke	Member of Parliament for Cardiganshire; 1722–1727	Succeeded by John Vaughan, 2nd Viscount Lisburne
Preceded by Thomas Powell	Member of Parliament for Cardigan Boroughs; 1727– 1728	Succeeded by Richard Lloyd
