= Richard Lloyd (Cardigan politician) =

British Member of Parliament

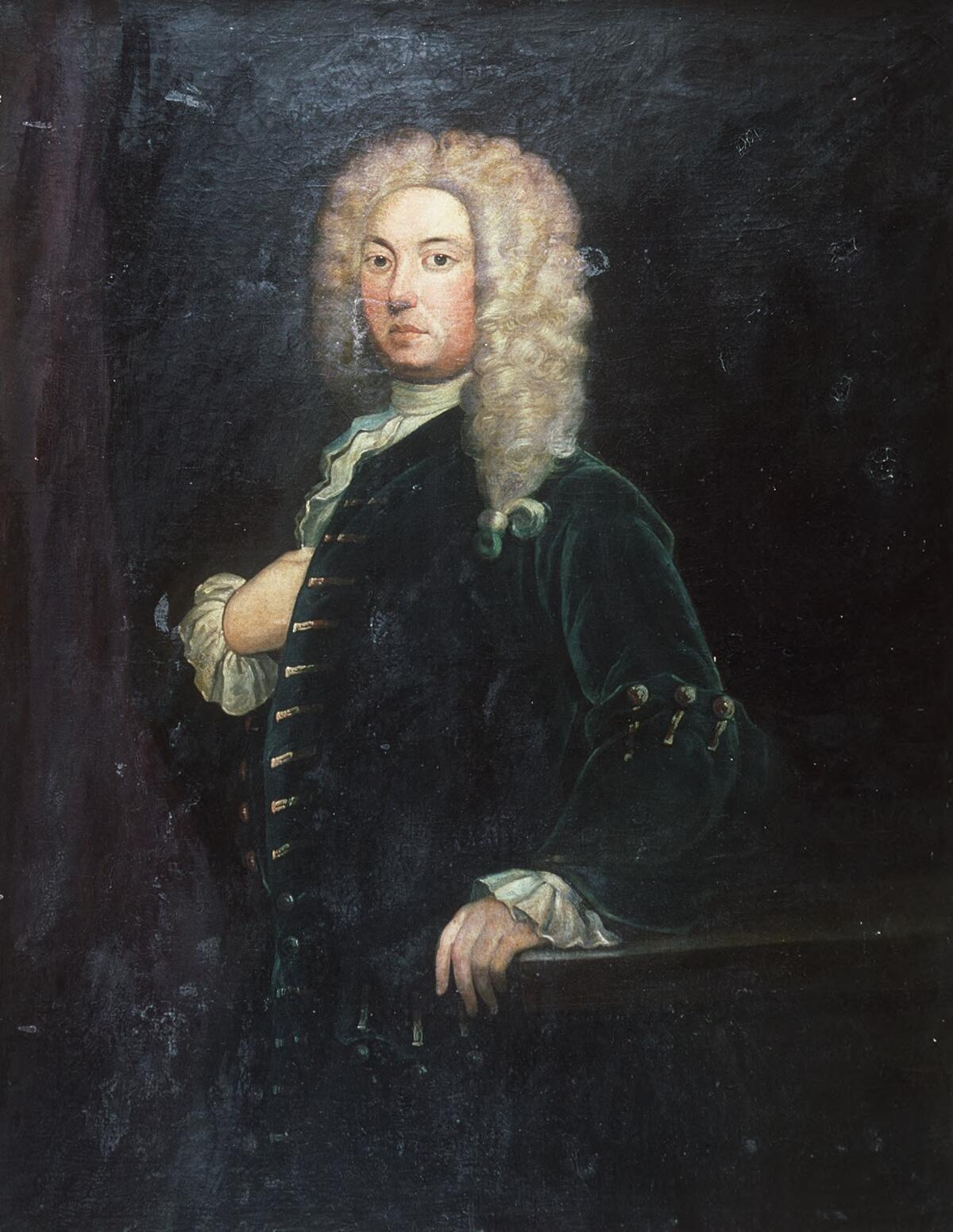
Richard Lloyd

Richard Lloyd (c. 1703 – 16 July 1757), of Mabws, Cardiganshire, was a Welsh Whig politician who sat in the House of Commons from 1730 to 1741.

Lloyd was the eldest son of Erasmus Lloyd of Mabws, Cardiganshire, and his wife Jane Pryse, daughter of Thomas Pryse of Glanfraed, a nephew of Lewis Pryse. He was admitted at Lincoln's Inn on 14 April 1720. He married a daughter of Edward Games of Tregaer, Breconshire.

Lloyd was returned on petition as a Whig Member of Parliament for Cardigan Boroughs on 7 May 1730. He was re-elected at the 1734 British general election. He voted with the Administration in all recorded divisions except that on the repeal of the Septennial Act, when he voted against them. He was defeated at the 1741 British general election and after petitioning repeatedly, his petition was finally dismissed on 23 January 1746.

Lloyd died on 16 July 1757, leaving one daughter.

Parliament of Great Britain
Preceded by Francis Cornwallis	Member of Parliament for Cardigan Boroughs; 1730–1741	Succeeded by Thomas Pryse
