= Edward Vaughan (died 1683) =

Welsh lawyer and politician

- Born: Cardiganshire, Wales
- Resting place: Llanafan Church
- Title: MP, Esquire, Lord
- Children: John Vaughan, 1st Viscount Lisburne
- Parent(s): John Vaughan (judge), Jane Stedman

Edward Vaughan (died 1683) was a Welsh lawyer and politician who sat in the House of Commons from 1679 to 1681.

== Life ==
Vaughan was born at Trawsgoed, Cardiganshire, Wales, the eldest son of the chief justice Sir John Vaughan and his wife Jane Stedman of Strata Florida. He became a student of the Inner Temple in November 1653, and was called to the Bar in 1660. He was nominated a Knight of the Royal Oak in 1660. In 1677 he edited his father's reports. He was elected member of parliament for Cardiganshire on 26 February 1679 and sat until 28 March 1681. He was one of the Lords of the Admiralty.

Vaughan married Letitia Hooker, the daughter of Sir William Hooker. Their son John (1670–1721), was created by William III in 1695, baron of Fethard County Tipperary, and viscount Lisburne, in the peerage of Ireland.

== Vaughan family ==
The Vaughan family, of Trawsgoed (Crosswood ), Cardiganshire in the ecclesiastical parish of Llanafan, can claim continuous residence on the same site for six centuries. Although it is a South Wales family, the pedigree is traced to Collwyn ap Tangno, founder of the fifth noble tribe of North Wales, Lord of Eifionydd, Ardudwy, and part of Lleyn, who had his residence on the site of Harlech Castle. who is usually associated with Caernarvonshire.

It is claimed that the first member of the family to settle at Trawsgoed was Adda ap Llewelyn Fychan (c. 1200); the older pedigrees agree in stating that he married Tudo (or Dudo), daughter and heiress of Ieuan Goch of Trawsgoed. Their great-grandson, Morus Fychan ap Ieuan, is said to have stabilised the Fychan, hence Vaughan, as surname. Among the family monuments (in the National Library of Wales) is an indenture of 1547 whereby Richard ap Moris Vaughan, father of Moris ap Richard ap Moris of Llanafan, in consideration of the intended marriage between the son and Elliw, daughter and heiress of Howell ap Jenkin, covenants, with other persons, to assure to the use of the son and Elliw two messages, etc...one of which is 'the place at Trausgoed', i.e. 'Plas Trawsgoed.' Thereafter the family monuments supply much material as to the succeeding members of the family and the estate (N.L.W. Calendar of Crosswood Deeds, 1927). The first Vaughan to marry a Stedman of Strata Florida appears to have been Edward Vaughan (d. 1635), who married Lettice, daughter of John Stedman. They were the parents of Sir John Vaughan (1603–1674), chief justice.

== Sources ==
- The parliamentary history of the principality of Wales, from the earliesr times to the present day, 1541-1895
- National Library of Wales
- Morgan, Gerald, "The Vaughans of Trawsgoed," Gomer, 1997, ISBN 1-85902-472-6
