= Thomas Phaer =

16th-century English lawyer and paediatrician

Thomas Phaer (also spelled Phaire, Fayre, Faer, Phayre, Phayer) (c. 1510 – 12 August 1560) was an English lawyer, paediatrician, and author. He was the author of The Boke of Chyldren, published in 1545, the first book on paediatrics written in the English language. He has been called "the Father of English Pediatrics"

== Life ==
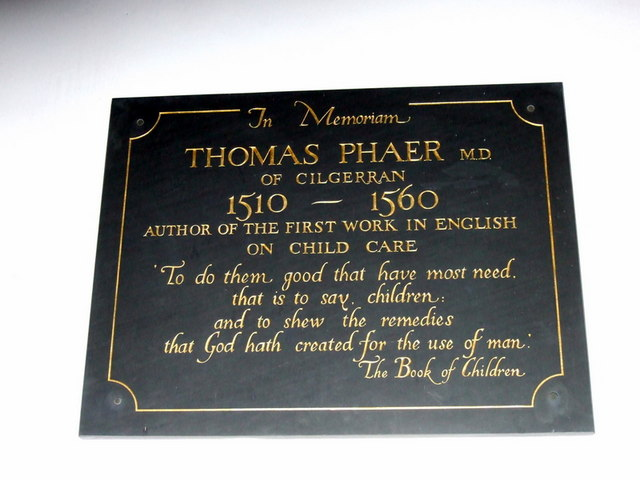
Memorial to Thomas Phaer of Cilgerran at the Church of St Llawddog, Cilgerran

It is thought that Phaer was born in Norwich. His father, also Thomas, was of Flemish descent. Phaer was educated at Oxford University. He studied law at Lincoln's Inn, and became Solicitor in the Court of the Welsh Marches; on his appointment he settled at the Welsh town of Cilgerran near Cardigan, where he lived until he died.

He was Member of Parliament for Carmarthen Boroughs in 1547 and for Cardigan for (1555–1559).

He applied to Oxford University for the degree of Bachelor of Medicine in February 1558, stating that he practised for twenty years. He was granted his Bachelor's, and then a Doctorate of Medicine, later that year.

Phaer died in Cilgerran, leaving his wife, Ann, and three daughters, Eleanor, Mary, and Elizabeth. He was buried in the local parish church. He is commemorated as one of the supporters in the coat of arms of the Royal College of Paediatrics and Child Health. The other supporter is June Lloyd.

== Works ==
He published Natura brevium in 1535, and Newe Boke of Presidentes in 1543. He began to practise medicine in the 1530s, in his mid to late twenties. He published The Regiment of Life in 1544, a translation of a French version of the Latin text Regimen Sanitatis Salerni, and The Boke of Chyldren was published the following year as an addedum to The Regiment of Life.

The Boke of Chyldren anticipated many later trends in medicine. In recognising children as a special class of patients, his book was one of the first treatises to make a distinction between childhood and adulthood. He recognised various mental diseases, listing of the "manye grevous and perilous diseases" to which children were susceptible, including "apostume of the brayne" (meningitis), colic, "terrible dreames and feare in the slepe" (nightmares) and "pissing in the bedde" (bedwetting). He counselled against unnecessary treatments for childhood diseases such as smallpox or measles ("The best and most sure helpe in this case is not to meddle with anye kynde of medicines, but to let nature work her operacion"). He also condemned the tendency of medical practitioners to obscure their meaning by using Latin, and the consequent confusion for the patient: "How long would they haue the people ignorant? Why grutche they phsyicke to come forth in Engliyshe? Woulde they haue no man to know but onely they?"

He contributed to Sackville's Mirrour for Magistrates, "Howe Owen Glendower, being seduced by false prophecies, toke upon him to be Prince of Wales." In his later years, he gained a degree of fame for his translation of Virgil's Aeneid. The Seven First Bookes of the Eneidos of Virgil converted into English Meter was published in 1558. He had completed two more books in April 1560 and had begun the tenth, but died in the autumn of that year, leaving his task incomplete. The translation was finished by Thomas Twyne in 1584. Phaer's translation, which was in rhymed fourteen-syllabled lines, was greatly admired by his contemporaries, although not the first attempt at a complete translation (Gawain Douglas had translated all twelve books and Maphaeus Vegius' thirteenth book as well). His translation remained popular until John Dryden's translation was published in The Works of Virgil in 1697.

== Works ==
- Natura brevium (1535)
- A Boke of Presidentes (1543) (a legal work)
- The Regiment of Life (1544) (translation from a French text of Regimen sanitatis Salernitanum)
- The Boke of Chyldren (1545) (56 pages, including 4-page preface)
- Virgil's Aeneid (1555) (translation from Latin)

== Sources ==
- Lee, Sidney, ed. (1896). "Phaer, Thomas" . Dictionary of National Biography. Vol. 45. London: Smith, Elder & Co.
- Schwyzer, Philip. "Phaer [Phayer], Thomas (1510?-1560)". Oxford Dictionary of National Biography (online ed.). Oxford University Press. doi:10.1093/ref:odnb/22085. (Subscription or UK public library membership required.)
- The Boke of Chyldren by Thomas Phaire, 1545, including brief biography
- Coat of Arms of the Royal College of Paediatrics and Child Health
