= Sir Herbert Lloyd, 1st Baronet =

Sir Herbert Lloyd, 1st Baronet (22 July 1720 – 19 August 1769) was a Welsh politician.

== Life ==
Lloyd was born in Llanddewibrefi and educated at Jesus College, Oxford. His father, Walter Lloyd of Voelallt, Cardiganshire, was attorney-general for south Wales and was succeeded by Herbert's elder brother, John Lloyd. Herbert Lloyd also trained as a lawyer, and was called to the bar by the Inner Temple in 1742. In 1761 he became Member of Parliament for Cardigan Boroughs, and on 26 January 1763 he was created a baronet. His later years were marked by increasing debt, the loss of his parliamentary seat and poor health.

== Death ==
Herbert Lloyd died on 13 August 1769, en route to Bath. The History of Parliament states that his death was by suicide; the Oxford Dictionary of National Biography calls that a baseless tradition.

== Family ==
Lloyd was married twice, but left no heir, and the title became extinct. His estates passed to his nephew John Adams, a spendthrift. They were sold to the lawyer Albany Wallis.

== Reputation ==
Geraint H. Jenkins in The Foundations of Modern Wales gave the nickname "Vulture Knight" of Lloyd and wrote that he "ruthlessly exploited the law for his own ends." Bethan Phillips in the Oxford Dictionary of National Biography wrote that he "became notorious for his irascible nature and oppressive behaviour", was deserted by his second wife, and shortly before his death "bigamously married a Mrs Bacon of Bishop Auckland". She assigned the nickname to "unpopularity among the Cardiganshire gentry". Lloyd-Johnes in the Dictionary of Welsh Biography wrote that he was "the reputed author of several violent deeds which have become almost legendary in Cardiganshire, and of which one has been the subject of a Welsh play."

== Sources ==
Parliament of Great Britain
| Preceded by John Symmons | Member of Parliament for Cardigan; 1761–1768 | Succeeded by Pryse Campbell |
Baronetage of Great Britain
| New creation | Baronet (of Peterwell); 1763–1769 | Extinct |
| Preceded by Dundas baronets | Lloyd baronets of Peterwell; 26 January 1763 | Succeeded by Smith baronets |
