= Toby Chauncy =

Toby Chauncy (2 February 1674 – 1733), of Edgcote, Northamptonshire, was a British lawyer and politician who sat in the House of Commons from 1730 to 1733.

Chauncy was the eldest surviving son of Toby Chauncy of Edgcote and his second wife Joan Paul, daughter of William Paul, Bishop of Oxford. He matriculated at Corpus Christi College, Oxford on 6 November 1690. He was admitted to Inner Temple and called to the bar in 1699. He or his father had stood unsuccessfully for Banbury at the 1705 English general election. By 1717, Chauncy was Recorder of Banbury. He succeeded his father to Edgcote on 4 March 1725.

Chauncy wrote to Lord Guildford, on 24 October 1729, offering to replace him as MP for Banbury on his elevation to the peerage. Guildford chose William Knollys, known as Lord Wallingford, as his nominee instead, but Chauncy stood at the by-election on 21 January 1730 and was returned as Member of Parliament with the support of the corporation, winning the contest by one vote. There is no record of his voting in any division.

Chauncy died unmarried on 27 March 1733. Edgcote House descended to Richard Chauncey in 1742 who built a new mansion between 1747 and 1752.

Parliament of Great Britain
Preceded by Hon. Francis North	Member of Parliament for Banbury; 1730–1733	Succeeded by William Knollys
