= Walter Overbury =

English politician (1592–1637)

Walter Overbury (1592–1637) was an English politician who sat in the House of Commons at various times between 1621 and 1626.

Overbury was the son of Sir Nicholas Overbury of Bourton-on-the-Hill, Gloucestershire and his wife Mary Palmer. His father was Chief Justice of the Great Sessions for Carmarthenshire, Cardiganshire, and Pembrokeshire in 1610, and Recorder of Gloucester from 1603 to 1626. Overbury matriculated at Magdalen College, Oxford, on 16 June 1610, aged 18 and was awarded BA on 21 February 1612. His elder brother Thomas was poisoned in the Tower of London on 19 October 1615. He was called to the Bar at the Middle Temple in 1617. In 1621, he was elected Member of Parliament for Cardigan. He was elected MP for Cardigan again in 1626. In 1628 he was Registrar of Assurances in the City of London.

Overbury died at the age of about 45 and was buried at Bourton-on-Hill on 6 April 1637.

Overbury married firstly by licence dated 6 November 1621 Mary Pinchion (d. 1623), daughter of Sir Edward Pinchion of Writtle, Essex and niece of Richard Weston, the newly appointed Chancellor of the Exchequer. He married secondly by licence, dated 21 June 1627, Magdalen, the widow of Edward Grimston of Bradfield, Essex and daughter of Thomas Marsham, a London merchant.

Parliament of England
Preceded by Robert Wolverstone	Member of Parliament for Cardigan; 1621–1622	Succeeded by Rowland Pugh
Preceded by Rowland Pugh	Member of Parliament for Cardigan; 1626	Succeeded by John Vaughan
