= John Vaughan (chief justice) =

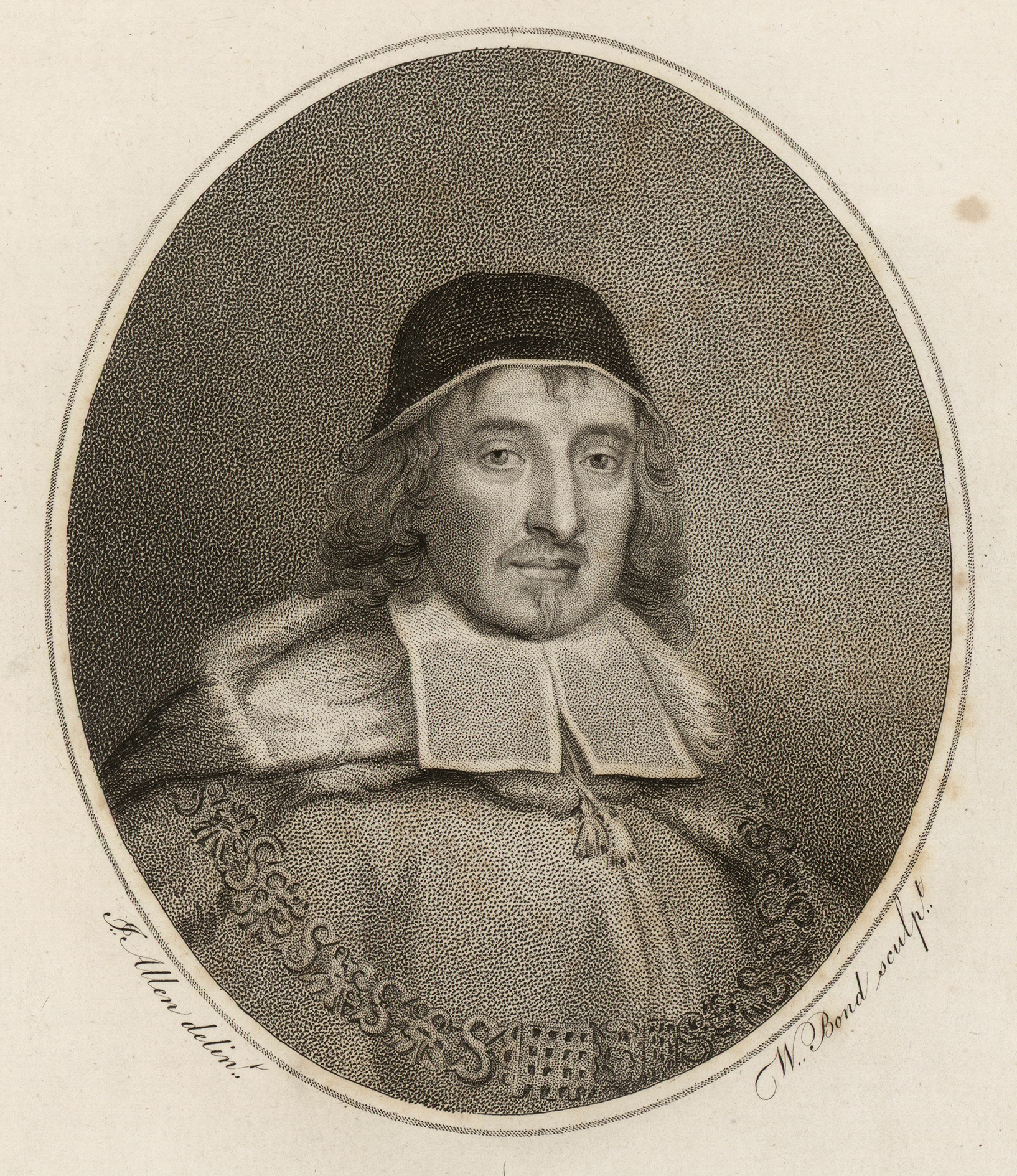
Sir John Vaughan

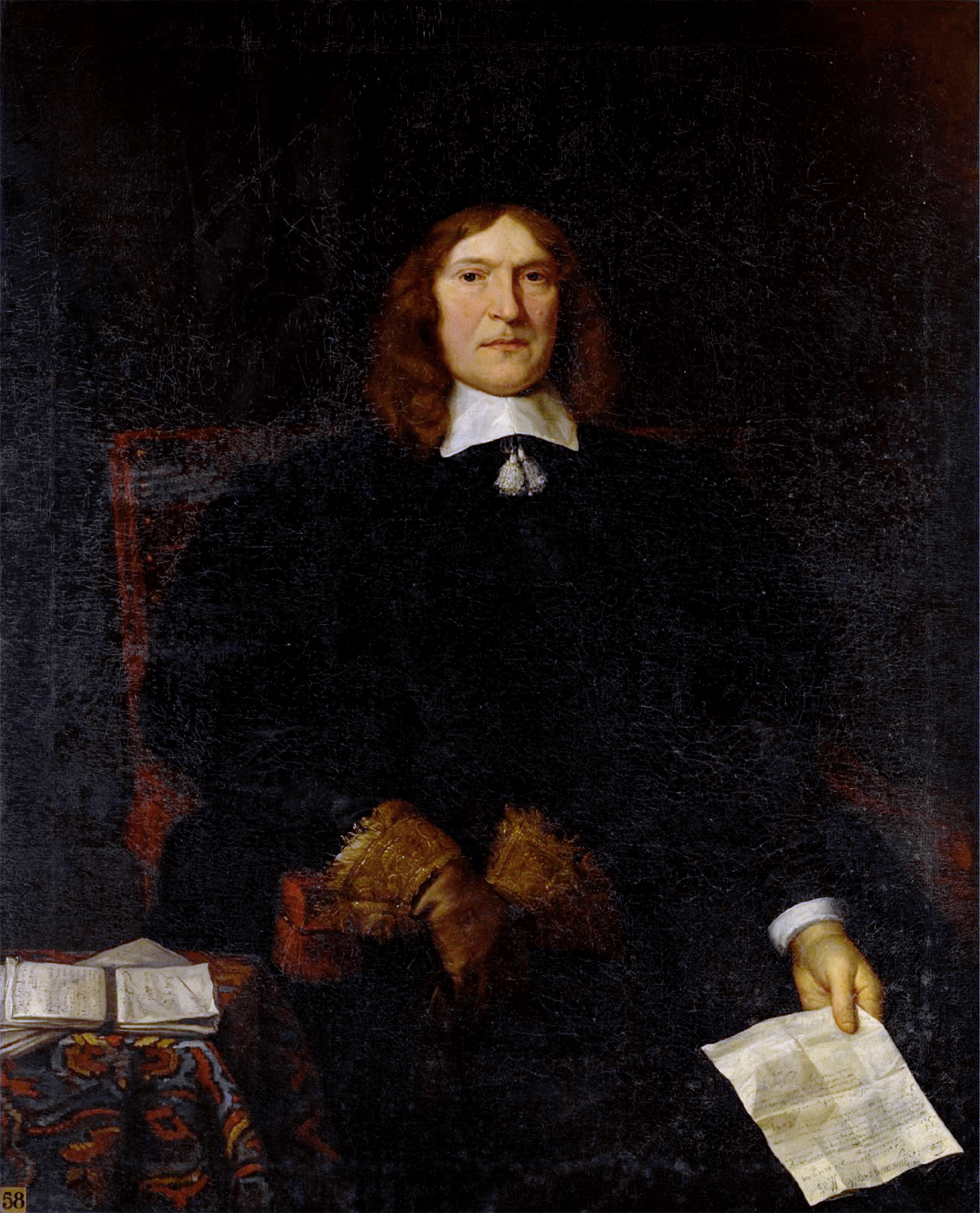
Judge John Vaughan

Sir John Vaughan SL (14 September 1603 – 10 December 1674), of Trawsgoed, was a justice in the Kingdom of England.

== Life ==
He was born in Ceredigion, Wales, the eldest of eight children of Edward Vaughan and his wife Letitia (Lettic) Stedman of Strata Florida, and was educated initially at The King's School, Worcester between 1613 and 1618, when he was admitted to Christ Church, Oxford. He attended until 1621, leaving without gaining a degree, and the same year was accepted into the Inner Temple.

In 1625 he married his cousin Jane Stedman, with whom he had a son Edward, and two daughters Anne and Lucy, and in 1628 he was elected as a Member of Parliament for Cardigan, representing them again at both the Short and Long Parliaments. He was a moderate royalist, helping to prosecute William Laud and write the Triennial Acts, but refused to support a bill of attainder against Thomas Wentworth, saying it was unconstitutional.

In 1630 he was called to the Bar. In that same year, he returned to Ceredigion before the outbreak of the English Civil War and bought eight Ceredigion granges, totalling 30,000 acres (120 km^{2}), formerly belonging to Strata Florida Abbey, further increasing the lands of Trawsgoed, the family estate. This led him to be one of the richest landowners in an economically poor country. Although at first a strong loyalist, the fall of Tenby in 1643 disturbed him, and he began training the local militia. As a result of this his house was plundered in July 1645, and he was banned from sitting in Parliament in September.

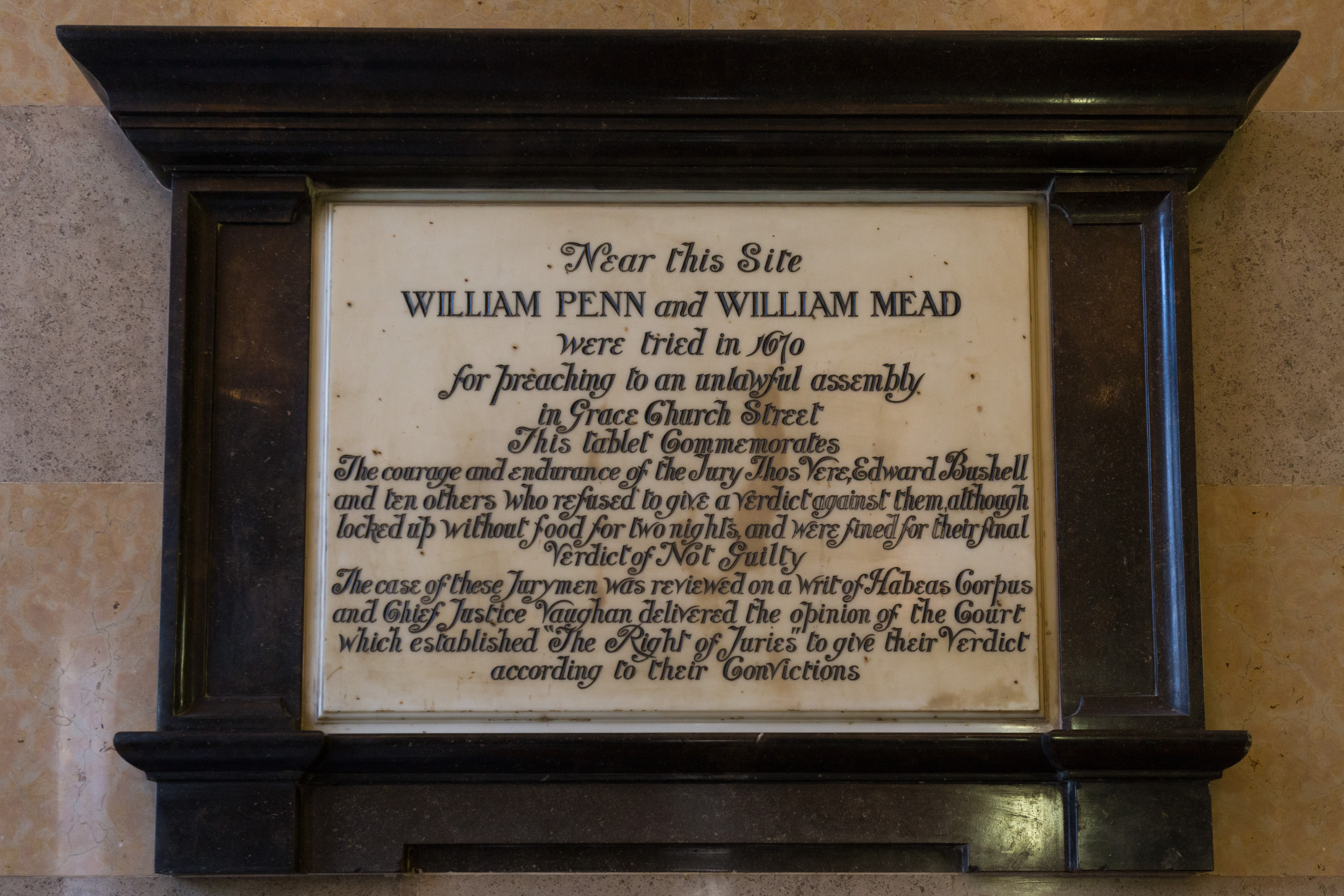
Plaque at the Old Bailey commemorating Bushel's Case

After the civil war he refused to return to public life, barely venturing out of his estates; the Earl of Clarendon claimed that he had lived ‘as near an innocent life as the iniquity of that time would permit’.

After the English Restoration, Vaughan returned to the House of Commons in 1661, representing Cardiganshire in the Cavalier Parliament. Refusing an offer of judicial preferment from his old friend Clarendon, now Charles II's Lord Chancellor and chief minister, Vaughan instead became one of the leaders of the "country party" which opposed Clarendon, securing Clarendon's impeachment in 1667. He was widely admired for his eloquence, with Samuel Pepys calling him "the great Vaughan".

He was knighted and made a serjeant-at-law on 20 May 1668, and made Chief Justice of the Common Pleas on 23 May. His most enduring case was Bushel's Case in 1670, which set the precedent that a jury could not be forced into changing a verdict which a judge does not approve of, one that has endured ever since; as such a plaque in the Old Bailey with the names of the jurors involved also includes that of Vaughan. He was a friend of John Selden, and acted as one of the executors of his estate after Selden's death in 1654, placing his library in the 'Selden end' of the Bodleian Library.

Vaughan died on 10 December 1674 at Serjeant's Inn, and was buried twelve days later at Temple Church, with Edward Stillingfleet speaking at his funeral. His court reports were later published by his son in 1677, with a corrected edition in 1706.

== Footnotes ==
Parliament of England
Preceded by Walter Overbury	Member of Parliament for Cardigan; 1628–1629	Parliament suspended until 1640
Vacant Parliament suspended since 1640	Member of Parliament for Cardigan; 1640–1645	Vacant Vaughan expelled Title next held by Thomas Wogan
Preceded by Sir Richard Pryse, Bt	Member of Parliament for Cardiganshire; 1661–1669	Succeeded by Edward Vaughan
Legal offices
Preceded by Orlando Bridgeman	Chief Justice of the Common Pleas; 1668–1674	Succeeded by Francis North
