= Clement Wearg =

English lawyer and politician

Sir Clement Wearg (1686–1726) was an English lawyer and politician, solicitor-general from 1724.

== Life ==
He was son and heir of Thomas Wearg of the Inner Temple, who married in 1679 Mary Fletcher of Ely, and was born in London. He was baptised at St. Botolph Without, Aldersgate, where his grandfather, Thomas Wearg, a wealthy merchant, lived. He matriculated at Peterhouse, Cambridge in 1705, and was admitted student at the Inner Temple on 25 November 1706; he was called to the bar in 1711, and became bencher in 1723, reader in 1724, and treasurer in 1725.

Wearg held strong Whig and Protestant views. He acted as the counsel for the crown in the prosecutions of Christopher Layer and Bishop Francis Atterbury, and was one of the principal managers for the House of Commons in the trial of Lord Chancellor Macclesfield. In 1722 he contested, without success, the borough of Shaftesbury in Dorset, but was returned for the Whig borough of Helston in Cornwall on 10 March 1724, having been appointed solicitor-general on the previous 1 February. About the same time he was created a knight. He died of a fever on 6 April 1726, and was buried, in accordance with the request in his will, in the Temple churchyard, under a plain raised tomb, on 12 April.

== Works ==
A volume published in 1723 contained The Replies of Thomas Reeve and Clement Wearg in the House of Lords, 13 May 1723, against the Defence made by the Late Bishop of Rochester and his Counsel. Other attributed works were the subject of controversy at the time. Edmund Curll advertised late in 1726 the publication of six volumes of Cases of Impotence and Divorce, by Sir Clement Wearg, late Solicitor-General. Curll was attacked for this by ‘A. P.’ in the ‘London Journal’ on 12 November 1726; and two days later swore an affidavit that a book produced by him, and entitled The Case of Impotency as debated in England, Anno 1613, in Trial between Robert, Earl of Essex, and the Lady Frances Howard, 1715, was also by Wearg. It was dated from the Inner Temple, 30 October 1714. Wearg then had chambers in the new court.

== Family ==
He married Elizabeth, only daughter of Sir James Montagu, chief baron of the exchequer. She died on 9 March 1746, and was buried in the same grave with her husband on 14 March. They had no children.

== Notes ==
Parliament of Great Britain
Preceded by Sir Robert Raymond; Walter Carey	Member of Parliament for Helston; 1724–1726; With: Walter Carey	Succeeded by Walter Carey; Exton Sayer
Legal offices
Preceded by Sir Philip Yorke	Solicitor General; 1724–1726	Succeeded by Sir Charles Talbot
