= Exton Sayer =

English lawyer and Whig politician (1691–1731)

Exton Sayer (c.1691–1731), of Doctors' Commons, London, was an English lawyer and Whig politician who sat in the House of Commons from 1726 to 1731. At his death he held several important legal positions.

Sayer was the eldest son of George Sayer of Doctors' Commons and his wife Mary Exton, daughter of Everard Exton, proctor of Doctors' Commons. He was admitted at Lincoln's Inn on 20 May 1709 and at Trinity Hall, Cambridge on 11 June 1709. He was awarded LL.B. in 1713, and was a Fellow of Trinity Hall from 1714 to 1724. In 1718 he was awarded LL.D. and succeeded his grandfather as proctor of Doctors’ Commons. He married Catherine Talbot, daughter of William Talbot, Bishop of Durham on 6 February 1724 and then became Chancellor of Durham diocese. He also obtained valuable leases of ecclesiastical coal-bearing lands. In 1727 he succeeded his father.

Sayer was returned as Member of Parliament for Helston, as a ministerial nominee, at a by-election on 13 May 1726 and quickly became one of the leading government spokesmen. He became Admiralty Advocate on 30 March 1727. At the 1727 British general election he was returned as MP for Totnes. On 26 February 1730 he led for the Government against an opposition sponsored petition to end the monopoly of the East India Company. He was appointed Surveyor general of Crown lands in 1730.

Sayer died without issue from a riding accident on 24 September 1731 and was buried in Durham Cathedral.

Parliament of Great Britain
Preceded by Sir Clement Wearg; Walter Carey	Member of Parliament for Helston; 1726–1727; With: Walter Carey	Succeeded by John Evelyn; John Harris
Preceded by Joseph Banks; Charles Wills	Member of Parliament for Totnes; 1727–1731; With: Charles Wills	Succeeded by Sir Henry Gough, Bt; Charles Wills
