= Richard Delabere =

English politician

Richard Delabere (c. 1559 – 1636), of Lincoln's Inn, London, was an English politician.

He was a member (MP) of the parliament of England for Cricklade in 1586 and for Cardigan Boroughs in 1601.
