= Walter Carey (politician) =

British administrator and politician

Walter Carey (also spelt 'Cary') FRS (17 October 1685 – 27 April 1757), of West Sheen, Surrey, was a British administrator and politician who sat in the House of Commons for 35 years from 1722 to 1757.

== Biography ==
Carey was the eldest son of Walter Carey of Everton, Bedfordshire and his wife Annabella Halford, daughter of Sir William Halford. He matriculated at New College, Oxford on 14 December 1704, aged 18 and was awarded B.A. in 1708, and created M.A. on 15 September 1730. He succeeded his father in 1714.

Cary was an extraordinary Clerk of the Privy Council from 1717 to 1729 and Clerk of the Privy Council in ordinary from 1729 to his death. He was surveyor general to the Prince of Wales (1723–25), Warden of the Mint (1725–27) and a Lord of Trade (1727–30).

He was a Member of Parliament in the Parliament of Great Britain for Helston from 1722 to 1727 and for Dartmouth from 1727 to 1757. He was also a Member of the Parliament of Ireland for Clogher from 1731 to 1757 and Chief Secretary to the Duke of Dorset as Lord Lieutenant of Ireland from 1730 to 1737. In 1731 he was made a member of the Privy Council of Ireland.

In 1727 he was elected a Fellow of the Royal Society. He was a Clerk of the Green Cloth from 1738 to his death.

Carey died in 1757. He had married twice: firstly Elizabeth, the daughter of Anthony Sturt, MP, of London and widow of John Jeffreys, MP and secondly Elizabeth, the daughter and coheiress of Anthony Collins of Baddow Hall, Essex. He had no children of his own with either wife.

Parliament of Great Britain
Preceded by Sir Gilbert Heathcote; Sidney Godolphin	Member of Parliament for Helston; 1722–1727; With: Sir Robert Raymond 1722–1724; Sir Clement Wearg 1724–1726; Exton Sayer 1726–1727	Succeeded by John Evelyn; John Harris
Preceded by George Treby III; Thomas Martyn	Member of Parliament for Dartmouth; 1727–1757; With: George Treby II 1727–1742; Lord Archibald Hamilton 1742–1747; John Jeffreys 1747–1757	Succeeded by John Jeffreys; Hon. Richard Howe
Parliament of Ireland
Preceded by Sir Ralph Gore, 4th Baronet; Silvester Crosse	Member of Parliament for Clogher; 1731–1757; With: Sir Ralph Gore, 4th Baronet 1731–1733; Richard Vincent 1733–1757	Succeeded by Richard Vincent; Nehemiah Nixon Donnellan
Political offices
Preceded by William Thompson	Warden of the Mint; 1725–1727	Succeeded by Sir Andrew Fountaine
Preceded by Thomas Clutterbuck	Chief Secretary for Ireland; 1730–1737	Succeeded by Sir Edward Walpole
