= Stephen Parry (Welsh MP) =

British Member of Parliament

Stephen Parry (c.1675–1724), of Neuadd Trefawr, was a Welsh politician who sat in the House of Commons from 1715 to 1724.

Parry was the only son of John Parry of Panteynon and his wife Margaret Bulbell of Dublin. He married Anne Parry, daughter of David Parry of Neuadd Trefawr. He succeeded his father in 1722.

At the 1715 general election, Parry was returned as Tory Member of Parliament for Cardigan Boroughs on the interest of Lewis Pryse. He was a poor attender at Parliament and was put into the custody of the serjeant at arms twice for failing to attend calls of the House. He was returned unopposed again for Cardigan Boroughs at the 1722 general election

Parry died without issue on 15 December 1724, aged 49.

Parliament of Great Britain
Preceded by Sir George Barlow, 2nd Baronet	Member of Parliament for Cardigan Boroughs; 1715–1724	Succeeded by Thomas Powell
