= Joshua Churchill =

British Member of Parliament (died 1721)

MP for Corfe Castle
- In office 21 January 1719 – 27 January 1721

Joshua Churchill (died 27 January 1721) was a British politician who sat in the House of Commons between 1719 and 1721.

Churchill was the fourth son of William Churchill of Dorchester. He was brother of the MPs Awnsham Churchill and William Churchill.

== See also ==
- List of MPs elected in the 1715 British general election
