= John Barlow (died 1718) =

Welsh politician

John Barlow (died 1718) was a Welsh politician who sat in the House of Commons from 1715 to 1718.

Barlow was the eldest son of John Barlow of Lawrenny and his wife Dorothy Barlow daughter of Thomas Barlow of Haverfordwest. He married Anne Owen, daughter of Sir Hugh Owen, 2nd Bt MP of Orielton, Pembrokeshire. He succeeded his father in 1701. In 1705 he was High Sheriff of Pembrokeshire.

In 1715 Barlow stood at a by-election at Haverfordwest and was defeated by a relation, Sir George Barlow of Slebech. However he was then awarded the seat on petition and represented Haverfordwest as Member of Parliament until his death two and a half years later.

Barlow died on 30 January 1718. His daughter Anne married Hugh Owen who inherited Lawrenny and changed his name to Barlow.

Parliament of Great Britain
Preceded by George Barlow	Member of Parliament for Haverfordwest; 1715–1718	Succeeded by Sir John Philipps, 4th Baronet
