= Thomas Powell (Cardiganshire MP) =

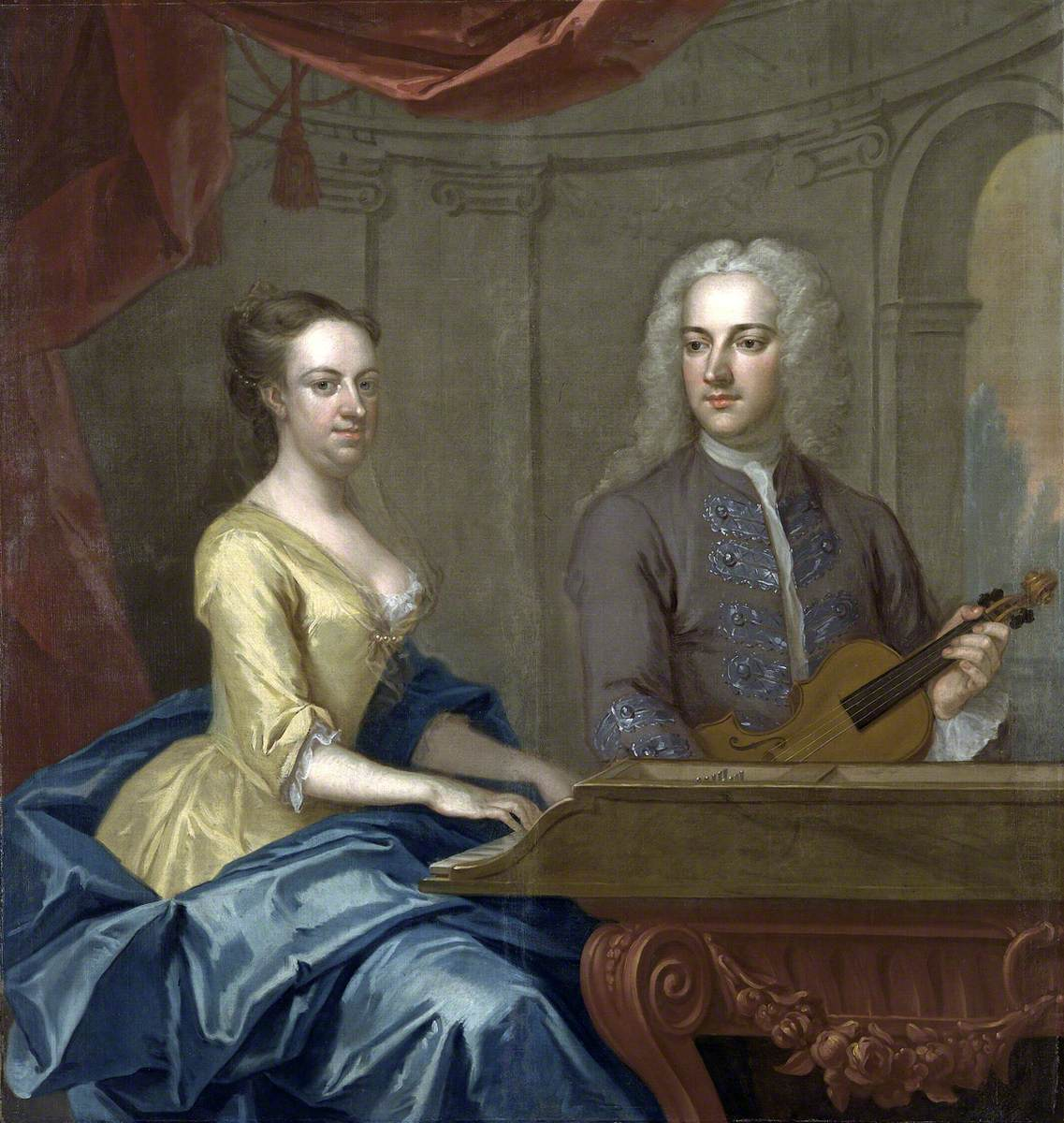

Thomas Powell (c. 1701–1752) of Nanteos, was a Welsh politician who sat in the House of Commons from 1725 to 1727 and from 1742 to 1747.

Powell was the eldest son of William Powell and Averina Le Brun; his mother was the daughter of Cornelius Le Brun of Cologne and Anne Jones, daughter of Colonel John Jones of Nanteos Mansion. Powell's father was a leading Welsh Jacobite who acquired Nanteos through his mother. Powell was admitted at Middle Temple in 1718. He married Mary Frederick, daughter of Thomas Frederick of Westminster.

Powell was returned as Tory Member of Parliament for Cardigan Boroughs at a by-election on 1 April 1725 on the strength of his control of Tregaron, one of the boroughs in the constituency. At the 1727 general election, he stood for Cardiganshire instead, but was unsuccessful. He then stood again for Cardigan Boroughs at a by-election in May 1729, which resulted in a double return. The House of Commons awarded the seat to Powell's opponent and also disfranchised the additional freemen which Powell had created at Tregaron, thus destroying his interest.

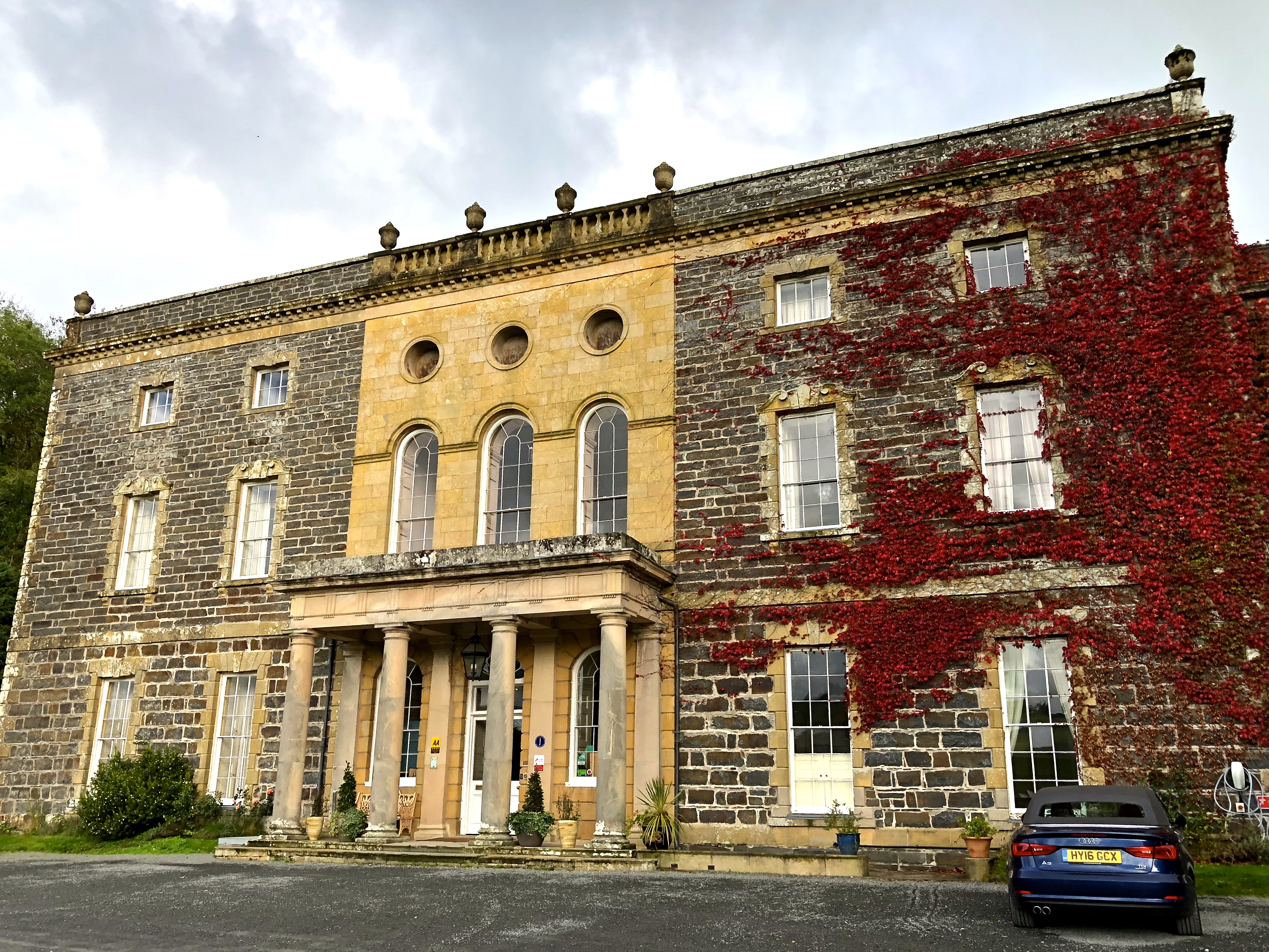
Nanteos Mansion

Powell succeeded to Nanteos on the death of his father in 1738, and almost immediately set about rebuilding the mansion. Thomas and Mary Powell laid the foundation stone on 3 May 1739.

At the 1741 general election, Powell stood at Cardiganshire again. He was defeated in the poll but was returned as MP on petition on 22 March 1742. He voted regularly against the Government and retired at the 1747 general election.

Powell died in the street of an apoplectic fit on 17 November 1752. The estate passed to his brother Rev. William Powell, who completed the rebuilding of the house.

Parliament of Great Britain
Preceded by Stephen Parry	Member of Parliament for Cardigan Boroughs; 1725–1727	Succeeded by Francis Cornwallis
Preceded by Walter Lloyd	Member of Parliament for Cardiganshire; 1742–1747	Succeeded by John Lloyd
