= Lewis Pryse =

Welsh politician (died 1720)

Lewis Pryse (c. 1683 – 1720) was a Welsh politician. He sat as MP for Cardiganshire from 10 December 1701 until 1702, Cardigan from 1705 until 1708, Cardiganshire from 1708 until 1710 and 1715 until 23 March 1716, though his appointment was opposed by his political opponent, Thomas Johnes. He also served as the Esquire of Gogerddan.

He was the oldest surviving son of Thomas Pryse and Margaret, the daughter of Lewis Owen. He was matriculated at Jesus College, Oxford on 1 April 1699, aged 15. He married Ann, the daughter of John Lloyd and they had two sons and four daughters. After his death in 1720, all property of his passed to his cousin, Thomas Pryse, as both of his sons had died before adulthood.
