= Cardigan (UK Parliament constituency) =

UK Parliament constituency (1542–1885)

- Former borough constituency for the House of Commons

1542–1885
- Seats: one
- Replaced by: Cardiganshire

The Cardigan District of Boroughs was a parliamentary constituency in Wales which returned one Member of Parliament (MP) to the House of Commons of the Parliament of the United Kingdom and its predecessors, from 1542 until it was abolished for the 1885 general election. The borough constituency comprised the four towns of Cardigan, Aberystwyth, Lampeter and Adpar - geographically separated from each other but all within the county of Cardiganshire.

== History ==
For much of its existence, the constituency was dominated by a relatively small number of landed families. During the eighteenth century, representation was keenly contested between the county families.

At the turn of the nineteenth century, the county town of Cardigan remained the largest of the boroughs with a population of 1,911 in 1801, and was controlled by the Earl of Lisburne. Lisburne's heir, John Vaughan, held the seat unopposed from 1796. However, Aberystwyth experienced rapid population growth in this period and its population reached 1,758 by 1801. Aberystwyth was under the influence of Edward Loveden Loveden, of Gogerddan. Loveden had obtained the estate through his marriage to Margaret Pryse, and coveted a parliamentary seat for his son, Pryse Loveden, who had adopted the name Pryse Pryse upon inheriting the estate upon his mother's death in 1796.

However, the Lisburne interest remained predominant until after the closely contested election of 1812, when Vaughan defeated Herbert Evans of Highmead by eighty votes.

After this contest, Vaughan's position became untenable, and it was assumed that he would not to contest the next election. In 1816, following the death of Thomas Johnes, the member for the county, Pryse Pryse of Gogerddan withdrew in favour of William Edward Powell of Nanteos, in order to avoid a contest. This was a political as well as a personal compromise, since Powell was a Tory and Pryse a Whig. In 1818, Pryse was elected unopposed for the boroughs, and held the seat for over thirty years. In 1832 the Reform Act resulted in a larger electorate as householders of homes worth over £10 were enfranchised in the boroughs. The constituency was still dominated by the Loveden-Pryse family of Gogerddan. Pryse Pryse held the seat from 1818 until his death in 1849, except for the 1841 election (see below). By agreement between Pryse and William Edward Powell, who continued as member for the county until his resignation in 1854, neither challenged the other's domination and so elections were almost always unopposed.

The one exception was the 1841 election when there was a close contest with John Harford, which was characterized by allegations of coercion. The contest was attended by a great deal of confusion. The poll books for Aberystwyth were either lost or stolen and never reached the returning officer, who came to the view that he should declare both candidates elected due to the uncertainty (the Conservative was slightly ahead in the polls from the other three parts). Neither of the two candidates could actually speak in the House of Commons until a committee determined the election, and it accepted the evidence that the Liberal candidate (Pryse) had outpolled the Conservative (Harford) by 305 to 285, enough to make his election secure, so he was given the seat.

In 1842, largely as a result of this episode, Pryse declared his support for the secret ballot.

Apart from 1855, when John Lloyd Davies won a byelection by 12 votes, the Conservatives never won the borough.

The last member to represent the constituency was David Davies from 1874 until 1885. When the county and borough constituencies were merged to form the Cardiganshire seat in 1885, David Davies comfortably won the election. In 1886, however, Davies joined the Liberal Unionists and was narrowly defeated at the General Election that year by the Liberal Party candidate.

== Members of Parliament ==
=== Members of Parliament 1542-1640 ===
As there were sometimes significant gaps between Parliaments held in this period, the dates of first assembly and dissolution are given. Where the name of the member has not yet been ascertained or (before 1558) is not recorded in a surviving document, the entry unknown is entered in the table.

Elected	Assembled	Dissolved	Member	Note
1542	16 January 1542	28 March 1544	unknown	
1545	23 November 1545	31 January 1547	Jenkin ap Rhees	
1547	4 November 1547	15 April 1552	John Cotton	History of Parliament gives Gruffydd Done
1553	1 March 1553	31 March 1553	Edward ap Howell	
1553	5 October 1553	5 December 1553	John Gwyn	
1554	2 April 1554	3 May 1554	John Powell	
1554	12 November 1554	16 January 1555	John Powell	History of Parliament gives John Gwyn
1555	21 October 1555	9 December 1555	Thomas Phaer	
1558	20 January 1558	17 November 1558	Thomas Phaer	
1559	23 January 1559	8 May 1559	Thomas Phaer	
1562–3	11 January 1563	2 January 1567	John Gwyn	
1571	2 April 1571	29 May 1571	Edward Davies	
1572	8 May 1572	19 April 1583	Edward Davies	
1584	23 November 1584	14 September 1585	Francis Cheyne	
1586	13 October 1586	23 March 1587	Francis Cheyne	
1588	4 February 1589	29 March 1589	Alban Stepney	
1593	18 February 1593	10 April 1593	Sir Ferdinando Gorges	
1597	24 October 1597	9 February 1598	Thomas Rawlins	
1601	27 October 1601	19 December 1601	William Aubrey; Richard Delabere	Double return unresolved at the dissolution of Parliament
1604	19 March 1604	9 February 1611	William Bradshaw	
1614	5 April 1614	7 June 1614	Robert Wolverstone	
1620	16 January 1621	8 February 1622	Walter Overbury	
12 January 1624	12 February 1624	27 March 1625	Rowland Pugh	
4 March 1625	17 May 1625	12 August 1625	Rowland Pugh	
12 January 1626	6 February 1626	15 June 1626	Walter Overbury	
31 March 1628	17 March 1628	10 March 1629	John Vaughan	
1640	13 April 1640	5 May 1640	John Vaughan	

=== Members of Parliament 1640-1660 ===
This sub-section includes the Long Parliament and the Rump Parliament, together with the Parliaments of the Commonwealth and the Protectorate (before the Convention Parliament of 1660).

==== Long Parliament and 1660-1885 ====
Year	Member	Party
November 1640	writ delivered too late to make a return, new writ ordered	
December 1640	John Vaughan	
1645	Vaughan expelled - seat vacant	
1646	Thomas Wogan	
1653	Cardigan was unrepresented in the Barebones Parliament and the First and Second Parliaments of the Protectorate	
January 1659	Col. Rowland Dawkins	
May 1659	Unrepresented in the restored Rump	
April 1660	James Philipps	
1663	Sir Charles Cotterell	
1679	Hector Phillips	
1693	John Lewis	
1698	Sir Charles Lloyd	
1701	Henry Lloyd	
1705	Lewis Pryse	
February 1710	Simon Harcourt	Tory
October 1710	John Meyrick	
1712	Owen Brigstocke	
1713	Sir George Barlow, 2nd Baronet	
1715	Stephen Parry	
1725	Thomas Powell	
1727	Francis Cornwallis	
1729	Richard Lloyd	
1741	Thomas Pryse	
1746	John Symmons	
1761	Sir Herbert Lloyd, 1st Baronet	
1768	Pryse Campbell	Whig
1769	Ralph Congreve	
1774	Sir Robert Smyth, 5th Baronet	
1775	Thomas Johnes	
1780	John Campbell	Pittite
1796	Hon. John Vaughan	
1818	Pryse Pryse	Whig
1849	Pryse Loveden	Whig
1855	John Lloyd Davies	Conservative
1857	Edward Pryse	Radical
1859	Edward Pryse	Liberal
1868	Sir Thomas Lloyd, 1st Baronet	Liberal
1874	David Davies	Liberal
1885	Constituency abolished	

== Election results ==
=== Elections in the 1830s ===
General election 1830: Cardigan Boroughs
Party	Candidate	Votes	%
Whig	Pryse Pryse	Unopposed	
Whig hold			

General election 1831: Cardigan Boroughs
Party	Candidate	Votes	%
Whig	Pryse Pryse	Unopposed	
Whig hold			

General election 1832: Cardigan Boroughs
Party	Candidate	Votes	%
Whig	Pryse Pryse	Unopposed	
Registered electors		1,030	
Whig hold			

General election 1835: Cardigan Boroughs
Party	Candidate	Votes	%
Whig	Pryse Pryse	Unopposed	
Registered electors		899	
Whig hold			

General election 1837: Cardigan Boroughs
Party	Candidate	Votes	%
Whig	Pryse Pryse	Unopposed	
Registered electors		920	
Whig hold			

=== Elections in the 1840s ===
General election 1841: Cardigan Boroughs
Party	Candidate	Votes	%	±%
Whig	Pryse Pryse	305	51.7	N/A
Conservative	John Scandrett Harford	285	48.3	New
Majority		20	3.4	N/A
Turnout		590	70.9	N/A
Registered electors		832		
Whig hold		Swing	N/A	

Originally, both Pryse and Harford were returned after the poll books for two polling stations at Aberystwyth were lost, with 226 votes recorded for Harford and 163 for Pryse. After extensive evidence, however, a committee determined the above results and Harford was declared unelected.

General election 1847: Cardigan Boroughs
Party	Candidate	Votes	%	±%
Whig	Pryse Pryse	Unopposed		
Registered electors		761		
Whig hold				

Pryse's death caused a by-election.

By-election, 12 February 1849: Cardigan Boroughs
Party	Candidate	Votes	%	±%
Whig	Pryse Pryse	299	50.7	N/A
Conservative	John Scandrett Harford	291	49.3	New
Majority		8	1.4	N/A
Turnout		590	89.8	N/A
Registered electors		657		
Whig hold		Swing	N/A	

=== Elections in the 1850s ===
General election 1852: Cardigan Boroughs
Party	Candidate	Votes	%	±%
Whig	Pryse Pryse	299	51.5	N/A
Conservative	John Inglis Jones	282	48.5	N/A
Majority		17	3.0	N/A
Turnout		581	68.4	N/A
Registered electors		849		
Whig hold		Swing	N/A	

Loveden (as Pryse was known at the time) died, causing a by-election.

By-election, 24 February 1855: Cardigan Boroughs
Party	Candidate	Votes	%	±%
Conservative	John Lloyd Davies	298	51.0	+2.5
Whig	John Evans	286	49.0	−2.5
Majority		12	2.0	N/A
Turnout		584	68.8	+0.4
Registered electors		849		
Conservative gain from Whig		Swing	+2.5	

General election 1857: Cardigan Boroughs
Party	Candidate	Votes	%	±%
Radical	Edward Pryse	Unopposed		
Registered electors		837		
Radical gain from Whig				

General election 1859: Cardigan Boroughs
Party	Candidate	Votes	%	±%
Liberal	Edward Pryse	Unopposed		
Registered electors		673		
Liberal hold				

=== Elections in the 1860s ===
General election 1865: Cardigan Boroughs
Party	Candidate	Votes	%	±%
Liberal	Edward Pryse	Unopposed		
Registered electors		685		
Liberal hold				

General election 1868: Cardigan Boroughs
Party	Candidate	Votes	%	±%
Liberal	Thomas Lloyd	Unopposed		
Registered electors		1,561		
Liberal hold				

=== Elections in the 1870s ===
General election 1874: Cardigan Boroughs
Party	Candidate	Votes	%	±%
Liberal	David Davies	Unopposed		
Registered electors		1,946		
Liberal hold				

=== Elections in the 1880s ===
General election 1880: Cardigan Boroughs
Party	Candidate	Votes	%	±%
Liberal	David Davies	Unopposed		
Registered electors		2,280		
Liberal hold				

== Sources ==
- The Parliamentary History of the Principality of Wales
- Leigh Rayment's Historical List of MPs – Constituencies beginning with "C" (part 2)
