= List of MPs elected in the 1741 British general election =

1741–1747 Parliament of Great Britain
←	1734–1741 Parliament	1747–1754 Parliament	→

Overview
- Legislative body: Parliament of Great Britain
- Meeting place: Palace of Westminster
- Term: 1 December 1741 – 18 June 1747
- Election: 1741 British general election
- Government: Broad Bottom ministry (24 November 1744–10 February 1744; 14 February 1746–6 March 1754); Short-lived ministry (10–12 February 1744); Carteret ministry (16 February 1742–24 November 1744); Walpole ministry (until 11 February 1742)

House of Commons
- Members: 558
- Speaker: Arthur Onslow
- Leader: Henry Pelham (from 27 August 1743); Samuel Sandys (12 February 1742–27 August 1743); Robert Walpole (until 6 February 1742)
- Prime Minister: Henry Pelham (from 27 August 1743); 1st Earl of Wilmington (16 February 1742–2 July 1743); Robert Walpole (until 11 February 1742)

House of Lords
- Lord Chancellor: Earl of Hardwicke
- Leader: Earl of Chesterfield (from October 1746); Earl of Harrington (until February 1742; November 1744–October 1746); Earl Granville (12 February 1742–24 November 1744)

Crown-in-Parliament George II

Sessions
- 1st: 1 December 1741 – 15 July 1742
- 2nd: 16 November 1742 – 21 April 1743
- 3rd: 1 December 1743 – 12 May 1744
- 4th: 27 November 1744 – 2 May 1745
- 5th: 17 October 1745 – 12 August 1746
- 6th: 18 November 1746 – 17 June 1747

List of MPs elected in the 1741 British general election

This is a list of the 558 MPs or members of Parliament elected to the 314 constituencies of the Parliament of Great Britain in 1741, the 9th Parliament of Great Britain and their replacements returned at subsequent by-elections, arranged by constituency.

Elections took place between 30 April 1741 and 11 June 1741.

Table of contents:

A B C D E F G H I J K L M N O P Q R S T U V W X Y Z By-elections Changes

== A ==
Aberdeen Burghs (seat 1/1)	John Maule	Whig
Aberdeenshire (seat 1/1)	Sir Arthur Forbes	Whig
Abingdon (seat 1/1)	John Wright	
Aldborough (seat 1/2)	John Jewkes - died Replaced by Nathaniel Newnham 1743	Whig.
Aldborough (seat 2/2)	Andrew Wilkinson	Whig
Aldeburgh (seat 1/2)	William Conolly	Whig
Aldeburgh (seat 2/2)	Richard Plumer	
Amersham (seat 1/2)	Sir Henry Marshall	Tory
Amersham (seat 2/2)	Thomas Gore - took office Replaced by William Drake 1746	Tory.
Andover (seat 1/2)	John Pollen	Whig
Andover (seat 2/2)	John Wallop	.
Anglesey (seat 1/1)	John Owen	Opp. Whig
Anstruther Easter Burghs (seat 1/1)	John Stewart	
Appleby (seat 1/2)	George Bubb Dodington - sat for Bridgwater; Replaced by Sir Charles Wyndham 1742	
Appleby (seat 2/2)	John Ramsden	Ind Whig
Argyllshire (seat 1/1)	Charles Campbell - died Replaced by James Stuart Mackenzie 1742	Whig.
Arundel (seat 1/2)	James Lumley	
Arundel (seat 2/2)	Garton Orme	
Ashburton (seat 1/2)	John Harris	
Ashburton (seat 2/2)	John Arscott	
Aylesbury (seat 1/2)	Charles Pilsworth	
Aylesbury (seat 2/2)	Viscount Petersham	
Ayr Burghs (seat 1/1)	The Earl of Granard	
Ayrshire (seat 1/1)	Patrick Crauford	
== B ==
Banbury (seat 1/1)	William Moore - died Replaced by John Willes 1746|	
Banffshire (seat 1/1)	James Abercromby	Whig
Barnstaple (seat 1/2)	John Harris	
Barnstaple (seat 2/2)	Henry Rolle	
Bath (seat 1/2)	General George Wade	
Bath (seat 2/2)	Philip Bennet	
Beaumaris (seat 1/1)	The 6th Viscount Bulkeley	Tory
Bedford (seat 1/2)	Samuel Ongley	Tory
Bedford (seat 2/2)	Sir Boteler Chernock	Tory
Bedfordshire (seat 1/2)	Sir Roger Burgoyne	Whig
Bedfordshire (seat 2/2)	Sir John Chester, 6th Bt	Tory
Bere Alston (seat 1/2)	Samuel Heathcote	Whig
Bere Alston (seat 2/2)	Sir William Morden	
Berkshire (seat 1/2)	Peniston Powney	Tory
Berkshire (seat 2/2)	Winchcombe Howard Packer - died Replaced by Henry Pye 1746	Tory.
Berwickshire (seat 1/1)	Hon. Alexander Hume-Campbell	Opp. Whig
Berwick-upon-Tweed (seat 1/2)	Thomas Watson	. Tory
Berwick-upon-Tweed (seat 2/2)	The Viscount Barrington	Tory
Beverley (seat 1/2)	Charles Pelham	Tory
Beverley (seat 2/2)	William Strickland	
Bewdley (seat 1/1)	William Bowles	Whig
Bishop's Castle (seat 1/2)	Marquess of Carnarvon - succeeded to a peerage Replaced by Granville Leveson Gower 1744	
Bishop's Castle (seat 2/2)	Andrew Hill	
Bletchingley (seat 1/2)	(Sir) Kenrick Clayton	
Bletchingley (seat 2/2)	Sir William Clayton - died Replaced by William Clayton 1745	
Bodmin (seat 1/2)	Thomas Bludworth	
Bodmin (seat 2/2)	John LaRoche	Whig
Boroughbridge (seat 1/2)	George Gregory - died Replaced by Earl of Dalkeith 1746	Whig.
Boroughbridge (seat 2/2)	James Tyrrell - died Replaced by William Murray 1742	
Bossiney (seat 1/2)	Richard Liddell - unseated on petition Replaced by John Sabine 1741 – unseated on petition Replaced by Richard Liddell 1742 - died Replaced by William Breton 1746	
Bossiney (seat 2/2)	Thomas Foster| - unseated on petition Replaced by Christopher Tower 1741 – unseated on petition Replaced by Thomas Foster 1742	
Boston (seat 1/2)	Lord Vere Bertie	
Boston (seat 2/2)	John Michell	
Brackley (seat 1/2)	George Lee - took office Replaced by Sewallis Shirley 1742	Whig.
Brackley (seat 2/2)	Paul Methuen	Whig
Bramber (seat 1/2)	Thomas Archer	
Bramber (seat 2/2)	Harry Gough (senior)	
Brecon (seat 1/1)	John Talbot	Whig
Breconshire (seat 1/1)	John Jeffreys	
Bridgnorth (seat 1/2)	Thomas Whitmore	Whig
Bridgnorth (seat 2/2)	William Whitmore	
Bridgwater (seat 1/2)	George Dodington	Whig
Bridgwater (seat 2/2)	Vere Poulett	Tory
Bridport (seat 1/2)	William Bowles - sat for Bewdley; Replaced by Viscount Deerhurst 1742- died Replaced by Viscount Deerhurst 1744	Whig..
Bridport (seat 2/2)	George Richards - died Replaced by Thomas Grenville 1746 - died Replaced by James Grenville 1747	
Bristol (seat 1/2)	Edward Southwell	Opp. Whig
Bristol (seat 2/2)	Sir Abraham Elton - died Replaced by Robert Hoblyn 1742	Whig.
Buckingham (seat 1/2)	George Chamberlayne	Whig
Buckingham (seat 2/2)	George Grenville	Whig
Buckinghamshire (seat 1/2)	Richard Grenville	Whig
Buckinghamshire (seat 2/2)	Richard Lowndes	
Bury St Edmunds (seat 1/2)	Thomas Hervey	
Bury St Edmunds (seat 2/2)	Thomas Norton	Whig
Buteshire (seat 0/0)	Alternating seat with Caithness - unrepresented in this Parliament	
== C ==
Caernarvon Boroughs (seat 1/1)	Sir Thomas Wynn, Bt	Whig
Caernarvonshire (seat 1/1)	William Bodvell	
Caithness (seat 1/1)	Alexander Brodie	
Callington (seat 1/2)	Thomas Coplestone	Whig
Callington (seat 2/2)	Hon. Horatio Walpole	Whig
Calne (seat 1/2)	William Elliot	Whig
Calne (seat 2/2)	Walter Hungerford	
Cambridge (seat 1/2)	Viscount Dupplin	Whig
Cambridge (seat 2/2)	James Martin - died Replaced by Christopher Jeffreason 1744	
Cambridgeshire (seat 1/2)	Soame Jenyns	
Cambridgeshire (seat 2/2)	Samuel Shepheard	
Cambridge University (seat 1/2)	Edward Finch	Whig
Cambridge University (seat 2/2)	Thomas Townshend	Whig
Camelford (seat 1/2)	The Earl of Inchiquin	
Camelford (seat 2/2)	Charles Montagu	
Canterbury (seat 1/2)	Thomas Watson - succeeded to a peerage Replaced by Sir Thomas Hales 1746	. Whig
Canterbury (seat 2/2)	Thomas Best	
Cardiff Boroughs (seat 1/1)	Herbert Mackworth	Tory
Cardigan Boroughs (seat 1/1)	Thomas Pryse - died Replaced by John Symmons 1746	
Cardiganshire (seat 1/1)	Walter Lloyd – unseated on petition Replaced by Thomas Powell 1742	
Carlisle (seat 1/2)	Charles Howard	
Carlisle (seat 2/2)	John Hylton - died Replaced by John Stanwix 1746	Tory.
Carmarthen (seat 1/1)	Sir John Philipps	
Carmarthenshire (seat 1/1)	Sir Nicholas Williams - died Replaced by John Vaughan 1745	
Castle Rising (seat 1/2)	Viscount Andover	Tory
Castle Rising (seat 2/2)	Charles Churchill - died Replaced by Richard Rigby 1745	Whig; Whig
Cheshire (seat 1/2)	Charles Cholmondeley	Tory
Cheshire (seat 2/2)	John Crewe	
Chester (seat 1/2)	Sir Charles Bunbury - died Replaced by Philip Henry Warburton 1742	Tory.
Chester (seat 2/2)	Robert Grosvenor	Tory
Chichester (seat 1/2)	James Brudenell - died Replaced by Viscount Bury 1746	Whig.
Chichester (seat 2/2)	John Page	
Chippenham (seat 1/2)	Edward Bayntun Rolt	Whig
Chippenham (seat 2/2)	Sir Edmond Thomas	
Chipping Wycombe (seat 1/2)	Harry Waller	Whig
Chipping Wycombe (seat 2/2)	Edmund Waller	Whig
Christchurch (seat 1/2)	Charles Armand Powlett 1740	Whig
Christchurch (seat 2/2)	Edward Hooper	
Cirencester (seat 1/2)	Thomas Master	Tory
Cirencester (seat 2/2)	Henry Bathurst	Tory
City of Durham	see Durham (City of)	...
City of London	see London (City of)	...
Clackmannanshire (seat 0/0)	Alternating seat with Kinross-shire - unrepresented in this Parliament	
Clitheroe (seat 1/2)	Thomas Lister - died Replaced by Thomas Lister, jun. 1745	Tory.
Clitheroe (seat 2/2)	William Curzon	
Clyde Burghs	see Glasgow Burghs	...
Cockermouth (seat 1/2)	Sir John Mordaunt	
Cockermouth (seat 2/2)	William Finch	Opp Whig
Colchester (seat 1/2)	John Olmius – unseated on petition Replaced by Samuel Savill	
Colchester (seat 2/2)	Matthew Martin – unseated on petition Replaced by Charles Gray	Whig; Tory
Corfe Castle (seat 1/2)	John Bond - died Replaced by Thomas Erle Drax 1744	
Corfe Castle (seat 2/2)	Henry Bankes	
Cornwall (seat 1/2)	Sir William Carew - died Replaced by Sir Coventry Carew 1744	Tory.
Cornwall (seat 2/2)	Sir John St Aubyn - died Replaced by Sir John Molesworth 1744	Tory.
County Durham	see Durham (County)	...
Coventry (seat 1/2)	William Grove	
Coventry (seat 2/2)	Earl of Euston	
Cricklade (seat 1/2)	Sir Thomas Reade	Whig
Cricklade (seat 2/2)	Welbore Ellis	
Cromartyshire (seat 1/1)	Sir William Gordon - died Replaced by Sir John Gordon 1742	
Cumberland (seat 1/2)	James Lowther	Whig
Cumberland (seat 2/2)	Sir Joseph Pennington - died Replaced by Sir John Pennington 1745	Whig,
== D ==
Dartmouth (seat 1/2)	George Treby - died Replaced by Lord Archibald Hamilton 1742	Whig
Dartmouth (seat 2/2)	Walter Carey	Whig
Denbigh Boroughs (seat 1/1)	John Wynn	Whig
Denbighshire (seat 1/1)	Watkin Williams	Tory
Derby (seat 1/2)	Lord James Cavendish - took office Replaced by Viscount Duncannon 1742	Whig.
Derby (seat 2/2)	John Stanhope	Opp. Whig
Derbyshire (seat 1/2)	Marquess of Hartington	Whig
Derbyshire (seat 2/2)	Sir Nathaniel Curzon, 4th Bt.	Tory
Devizes (seat 1/2)	Francis Eyles - took office Replaced by George Lee 1742	Whig; Whig
Devizes (seat 2/2)	John Garth	Whig
Devon (seat 1/2)	Sir William Courtenay, Bt	
Devon (seat 2/2)	Theophilus Fortescue - died Replaced by Sir Thomas Dyke Acland 1746	Whig.
Dorchester (seat 1/2)	Nathaniel Gundry	
Dorchester (seat 2/2)	John Browne	Tory
Dorset (seat 1/2)	George Chafin	Toty
Dorset (seat 2/2)	Edmund Morton Pleydell	Tory
Dover (seat 1/2)	Lord George Sackville	
Dover (seat 2/2)	Thomas Revell	
Downton (seat 1/2)	Anthony Duncombe	Whig
Downton (seat 2/2)	Joseph Windham-Ashe John Verney - died Replaced by Joseph Windham Ashe 1742 - died Replaced by George Proctor 1746	. Whig.
Droitwich (seat 1/2)	Thomas Foley	Tory
Droitwich (seat 2/2)	Thomas Winnington - sat for Worcester; Replaced by Lord George Bentinck 1742	Whig; Whig
Dumfries Burghs (seat 1/1)	Lord John Johnstone - died Replaced by Sir James Johnstone 1743	
Dumfriesshire (seat 1/1)	Sir John Douglas	
Dunbartonshire (seat 1/1)	John Campbell	Whig
Dunwich (seat 1/2)	Sir George Downing, Bt	Whig
Dunwich (seat 2/2)	Jacob Garrard Downing	
Durham (City of) (seat 1/2)	John Shafto - died Replaced by John Tempest 1742	Tory.
Durham (City of) (seat 2/2)	Henry Lambton	Whig
Durham (County) (seat 1/2)	George Bowes	Whig
Durham (County) (seat 2/2)	John Hedworth	Independent Whig
Dysart Burghs (seat 1/1)	James Oswald 1746	
== E ==
East Grinstead (seat 1/2)	Earl of Middlesex - took office Replaced by John Butler 1742	
East Grinstead (seat 2/2)	Sir Whistler Webster	
East Looe (seat 1/2)	Francis Gashry	Whig
East Looe (seat 2/2)	James Buller	Tory
East Retford (seat 1/2)	John White	
East Retford (seat 2/2)	William Mellish	
Edinburgh (seat 1/1)	Archibald Stewart	
Edinburghshire (seat 1/1)	Sir Charles Gilmour	
Elgin Burghs (seat 1/1)	Sir James Grant - died Replaced by William Grant 1747	
Elginshire (seat 1/1)	Sir Ludovick Grant	
Essex (seat 1/2)	Thomas Bramston	
Essex (seat 2/2)	Sir Robert Abdy	Tory
Evesham (seat 1/2)	Sir John Rushout	
Evesham (seat 2/2)	Edward Rudge	
Exeter (seat 1/2)	Sir Henry Northcote - died Replaced by Sir Richard Bampfylde 1743	
Exeter (seat 2/2)	Humphrey Sydenham	
Eye (seat 1/2)	Stephen Cornwallis - died Replaced by Edward Cornwallis 1743	
Eye (seat 2/2)	John Cornwallis	
== F ==
Fife (seat 1/1)	Sir John Anstruther	
Flint Boroughs (seat 1/1)	Sir George Wynne, Bt – unseated on petition Replaced by Richard Williams 1742	
Flintshire (seat 1/1)	Sir John Glynne	
Forfarshire (seat 1/1)	William Maule	
Fowey (seat 1/2)	Jonathan Rashleigh	Tory
Fowey (seat 2/2)	William Wardour - died Replaced by George Edgcumbe 1746|	
== G ==
Gatton (seat 1/2)	George Newland	
Gatton (seat 2/2)	Charles Docminique - died Replaced by Paul Humphrey 1745	
Glamorganshire (seat 1/1)	Bussy Mansel - succeeded to a peerage Replaced by Thomas Mathews 1745	
Glasgow Burghs (seat 1/1)	Neil Buchanan - died Replaced by John Campbell 1744	
Gloucester (seat 1/2)	Benjamin Bathurst I	
Gloucester (seat 2/2)	John Selwyn	
Gloucestershire (seat 1/2)	Thomas Chester	
Gloucestershire (seat 2/2)	Norborne Berkeley	
Grampound (seat 1/2)	Daniel Boone	
Grampound (seat 2/2)	William Banks	
Grantham (seat 1/2)	Sir Michael Newton - died Replaced by Sir John Cust 1743	
Grantham (seat 2/2)	Marquess of Granby	
Great Bedwyn (seat 1/2)	Sir Edward Turner	Whig
Great Bedwyn (seat 2/2)	Lascelles Metcalfe	
Great Grimsby (seat 1/2)	William Lock	
Great Grimsby (seat 2/2)	Robert Knight	
Great Marlow (seat 1/2)	Samuel Tufnell	
Great Marlow (seat 2/2)	Sir Thomas Hoby - died Replaced by William Ockenden 1744	
Great Yarmouth (seat 1/2)	Roger Townshend	
Great Yarmouth (seat 2/2)	Edward Walpole	
Guildford (seat 1/2)	Denzil Onslow	
Guildford (seat 2/2)	Colonel Richard Onslow	
== H ==
Haddington Burghs (seat 1/1)	James Fall; Replaced by Sir Hew Dalrymple, 2nd Baronet 1742	
Haddingtonshire (seat 1/1)	John Cockburn	
Hampshire (seat 1/2)	Lord Harry Powlett	
Hampshire (seat 2/2)	Paulet St John	
Harwich (seat 1/2)	John Phillipson	
Harwich (seat 2/2)	Hill Mussenden	
Haslemere (seat 1/2)	James Oglethorpe	Tory
Haslemere (seat 2/2)	Peter Burrell	
Hastings (seat 1/2)	James Pelham	
Hastings (seat 2/2)	Andrew Stone	Whig
Haverfordwest (seat 1/1)	Sir Erasmus Philipps - died Replaced by George Barlow 1743	
Hedon (seat 1/2)	The Earl of Mountrath - died Replaced by George Anson 1744	
Hedon (seat 2/2)	George Berkeley - died Replaced by Samuel Gumley 1746 - unseated on petition Replaced by Luke Robinson 1747	
Helston (seat 1/2)	John Evelyn	
Helston (seat 2/2)	John Harris	
Hereford (seat 1/2)	Edward Cope Hopton	
Hereford (seat 2/2)	Thomas Geers Winford	
Herefordshire (seat 1/2)	Velters Cornewall	
Herefordshire (seat 2/2)	Edward Harley - succeeded to a peerage Replaced by Thomas Foley 1742	
Hertford (seat 1/2)	Nathaniel Brassey	
Hertford (seat 2/2)	George Harrison	
Hertfordshire (seat 1/2)	Jacob Houblon	
Hertfordshire (seat 2/2)	Charles Gore	
Heytesbury (seat 1/2)	Pierce A'Court-Ashe	
Heytesbury (seat 2/2)	Edward Ashe	
Higham Ferrers (seat 1/1)	Henry Finch - sat for Malton; Replaced by Henry Seymour Conway 1741	
Hindon (seat 1/2)	Sir Henry Calthorpe	
Hindon (seat 2/2)	William Steele	
Honiton (seat 1/2)	Henry Reginald Courtenay	
Honiton (seat 2/2)	Sir William Yonge	Whig
Horsham (seat 1/2)	Sir Richard Mill, Bt	
Horsham (seat 2/2)	Charles Ingram	
Huntingdon (seat 1/2)	Edward Wortley Montagu	
Huntingdon (seat 2/2)	Wills Hill - sat for Warwick; Replaced by Albert Nesbitt 1741	
Huntingdonshire (seat 1/2)	William Mitchell	
Huntingdonshire (seat 2/2)	Coulson Fellowes	
Hythe (seat 1/2)	Hercules Baker - died Replaced by Thomas Hales 1744	
Hythe (seat 2/2)	William Glanville	
== I ==
Ilchester (seat 1/2)	Charles Lockyer	
Ilchester (seat 2/2)	Sir Robert Brown	
Inverness Burghs (seat 1/1)	Kenneth Mackenzie	
Inverness-shire (seat 1/1)	Norman Macleod	
Ipswich (seat 1/2)	Samuel Kent	
Ipswich (seat 2/2)	Edward Vernon	
== K ==
Kent (seat 1/2)	Sir Roger Twisden	
Kent (seat 2/2)	Sir Edward Dering	Tory
Kincardineshire (seat 1/1)	Sir James Carnegie	
King's Lynn (seat 1/2)	Sir Robert Walpole -raised to the peerage Replaced by Edward Bacon 1742	Whig.
King's Lynn (seat 2/2)	Sir John Turner	
Kingston upon Hull (seat 1/2)	George Crowle	
Kingston upon Hull (seat 2/2)	William Carter - died Replaced by Harry Pulteney 1744	
Kinross-shire (seat 1/1)	Sir John Bruce Hope, 7th Baronet	
Kirkcudbright Stewartry (seat 1/1)	Basil Hamilton - died Replaced by John Maxwell 1742	
Knaresborough (seat 1/2)	Richard Arundell	
Knaresborough (seat 2/2)	Sir Henry Slingsby, Bt	
== L ==
Lanarkshire (seat 1/1)	Sir James Hamilton	Whig
Lancashire (seat 1/2)	Lord Strange	
Lancashire (seat 2/2)	Richard Shuttleworth	Tory
Lancaster (seat 1/2)	Robert Fenwick	
Lancaster (seat 2/2)	Sir Thomas Lowther - died Replaced by Francis Reynolds 1745	
Launceston (seat 1/2)	Sir William Irby	
Launceston (seat 2/2)	Sir William Morice	
Leicester (seat 1/2)	George Wrighte	
Leicester (seat 2/2)	James Wigley	
Leicestershire (seat 1/2)	Sir Thomas Cave	
Leicestershire (seat 2/2)	Edward Smith	
Leominster (seat 1/2)	John Caswall - died Replaced by Robert Harley 1742	
Leominster (seat 2/2)	Capel Hanbury	
Lewes (seat 1/2)	Thomas Pelham - died Replaced by Sir John Shelley 1743	
Lewes (seat 2/2)	John Morley Trevor - died Replaced by Sir Francis Poole 1743	
Lichfield (seat 1/2)	George Venables Vernon	
Lichfield (seat 2/2)	Sir Lister Holte, Bt	
Lincoln (seat 1/2)	Charles Monson	
Lincoln (seat 2/2)	Sir John Tyrwhitt, 6th Bt	
Lincolnshire (seat 1/2)	Robert Vyner	
Lincolnshire (seat 2/2)	Thomas Whichcot	
Linlithgow Burghs (seat 1/1)	James Carmichael; Replaced by John Mackye 1742	
Linlithgowshire (seat 1/1)	George Dundas - took office Replaced by Charles Hope Weir 1743	
Liskeard (seat 1/2)	Richard Eliot	
Liskeard (seat 2/2)	Charles Trelawny	
Liverpool (seat 1/2)	Thomas Salusbury	
Liverpool (seat 2/2)	Richard Gildart	
London (City of) (seat 1/4)	George Heathcote	Tory
London (City of) (seat 2/4)	Sir John Barnard	Tory
London (City of) (seat 3/4)	Sir Daniel Lambert	Tory
London (City of) (seat 4/4)	Sir Robert Godschall - died Replaced by William Calvert 1742	Tory; Whig
Lostwithiel (seat 1/2)	Sir Robert Salusbury Cotton	
Lostwithiel (seat 2/2)	John Crosse	
Ludgershall (seat 1/2)	Charles Selwyn	
Ludgershall (seat 2/2)	Thomas Hayward	
Ludlow (seat 1/2)	Henry Arthur Herbert - raised to the peerage Replaced by Richard Herbert 1743	
Ludlow (seat 2/2)	Sir William Corbet, Bt	
Lyme Regis (seat 1/2)	John Scrope	
Lyme Regis (seat 2/2)	Henry Holt Henley	
Lymington (seat 1/2)	Lord Nassau Powlett - died Replaced by Charles Powlett 1741	
Lymington (seat 2/2)	Harry Burrard	
== M ==
Maidstone (seat 1/2)	Lord Guernsey	
Maidstone (seat 2/2)	John Bligh	
Maldon (seat 1/2)	Sir Thomas Drury, Bt	
Maldon (seat 2/2)	Robert Colebrooke	
Malmesbury (seat 1/2)	Giles Earle	
Malmesbury (seat 2/2)	William Rawlinson Earle	
Malton (seat 1/2)	Henry Finch	
Malton (seat 2/2)	Lord James Cavendish - died Replaced by John Mostyn 1741	
Marlborough (seat 1/2)	Sir John Hynde Cotton	
Marlborough (seat 2/2)	John Crawley	
Marlow	see Great Marlow	...
Melcombe Regis	see Weymouth and Melcombe Regis	...
Merionethshire (seat 1/1)	William Vaughan	Ind
Middlesex (seat 1/2)	William Pulteney - raised to the peerage Replaced by Sir Roger Newdigate 1742	
Middlesex (seat 2/2)	Sir Hugh Smithson	Tory
Midhurst (seat 1/2)	Sir John Peachey - died Replaced by Sir John Peachey 1744	
Midhurst (seat 2/2)	Thomas Bootle	
Milborne Port (seat 1/2)	Jeffrey French	
Milborne Port (seat 2/2)	Thomas Medlycott - took office Replaced by Michael Harvey 1742	
Minehead (seat 1/2)	Thomas Carew	
Minehead (seat 2/2)	Francis Whitworth - died Replaced by John Periam 1742	
Mitchell (seat 1/2)	Edward Clive - took office Replaced by Richard Lloyd 1745	
Mitchell (seat 2/2)	John Ord - died Replaced by Sir Edward Pickering 1745	
Monmouth Boroughs (seat 1/1)	Lord Charles Noel Somerset - succeeded to a peerage Replaced by Sir Charles Kemys Tynte 1745	
Monmouthshire (seat 1/2)	Thomas Morgan, the Elder	
Monmouthshire (seat 2/2)	Charles Hanbury Williams	
Montgomery (seat 1/1)	James Cholmondeley	
Montgomeryshire (seat 1/1)	Sir Watkin Williams Wynn - sat for Denbighshire; Replaced by Robert Williams 1742	
Morpeth (seat 1/2)	Robert Ord	
Morpeth (seat 2/2)	Sir Henry Liddell	
Much Wenlock (seat 1/2)	see Wenlock	...
== N ==
Nairnshire (seat 0/0)	Alternating seat with Cromartyshire - unrepresented in this parliament	
Newark (seat 1/2)	Lord William Manners	
Newark (seat 2/2)	Job Staunton Charlton	
Newcastle-under-Lyme (seat 1/2)	Baptist Leveson-Gower	
Newcastle-under-Lyme (seat 2/2)	Randle Wilbraham	
Newcastle-upon-Tyne (seat 1/2)	Sir Walter Calverley-Blackett, Bt	
Newcastle-upon-Tyne (seat 2/2)	Nicholas Fenwick	
Newport (Cornwall) (seat 1/2)	Nicholas Herbert	
Newport (Cornwall) (seat 2/2)	Thomas Bury	
Newport (Isle of Wight) (seat 1/2)	Anthony Chute	
Newport (Isle of Wight) (seat 2/2)	Monoux Cope	
New Radnor Boroughs (seat 1/1)	Thomas Lewis	Whig
New Romney (seat 1/2)	Henry Furnese	
New Romney (seat 2/2)	Sir Francis Dashwood	Tory
New Shoreham (seat 1/2)	Charles Frederick	
New Shoreham (seat 2/2)	Thomas Brand	
Newton (Lancashire) (seat 2/2)	Legh Master	
Newton (Lancashire) (seat 1/2)	William Shippen - died Replaced by Peter Legh 1743	
Newtown (Isle of Wight) (seat 1/2)	Sir John Barrington	
Newtown (Isle of Wight) (seat 2/2)	Henry Holmes	
New Windsor (seat 1/2)	Henry Fox	
New Windsor (seat 2/2)	Lord Sidney Beauclerk - died Replaced by Lord George Beauclerk 1744	
New Woodstock (seat 2/2)	James Dawkins	
New Woodstock (seat 1/2)	John Spencer - died Replaced by John Trevor 1746	
Norfolk (seat 1/2)	Armine Wodehouse	Tory
Norfolk (seat 2/2)	Viscount Coke	Whig
Northallerton (seat 1/2)	William Smelt - took office Replaced by Henry Lascelles 1745	
Northallerton (seat 2/2)	Henry Peirse	
Northampton (seat 1/2)	Hon. George Compton	
Northampton (seat 2/2)	William Wilmer - died Replaced by George Montagu 1744	
Northamptonshire (seat 1/2)	Sir Edmund Isham	
Northamptonshire (seat 2/2)	Thomas Cartwright	Tory
Northumberland (seat 1/2)	Sir William Middleton, Bt	
Northumberland (seat 2/2)	John Fenwick	
Norwich (seat 1/2)	Thomas Vere	
Norwich (seat 2/2)	Horatio Walpole	Whig
Nottingham (seat 1/2)	John Plumptre	Whig
Nottingham (seat 2/2)	Borlase Warren - died Replaced by Sir Charles Sedley 1747	Tory
Nottinghamshire (seat 1/2)	William Levinz	
Nottinghamshire (seat 2/2)	John Mordaunt	
== O ==
Okehampton (seat 1/2)	George Lyttelton	
Okehampton (seat 2/2)	Thomas Pitt	
Old Sarum (seat 1/2)	William Pitt	.
Old Sarum (seat 2/2)	George Lyttelton - sat for Okehampton; Replaced by James Grenville 1742 - took office Replaced by Edward Willes 1747	
Orford (seat 1/2)	Henry Legge	
Orford (seat 2/2)	Viscount Glenorchy - took office Replaced by John Bateman 1746	
Orkney and Shetland (seat 1/1)	Robert Douglas - died Replaced by James Halyburton 1747	
Oxford (seat 1/2)	Thomas Rowney, junior	
Oxford (seat 2/2)	Philip Herbert	
Oxfordshire (seat 1/2)	Sir James Dashwood	
Oxfordshire (seat 2/2)	Viscount Quarendon - succeeded to a peerage Replaced by Norris Bertie 1743	
Oxford University (seat 1/2)	Edward Butler - died Replaced by Peregrine Palmer 1745	Tory; Tory
Oxford University (seat 2/2)	Viscount Cornbury	Tory
== P ==
Peeblesshire (seat 1/1)	Alexander Murray	
Pembroke Boroughs (seat 1/1)	William Owen	
Pembrokeshire (seat 1/1)	John Campbell	
Penryn (seat 1/2)	John Evelyn	
Penryn (seat 2/2)	Edward Vernon - sat for Ipswich; Replaced by George Boscawen 1743	
Perth Burghs (seat 1/1)	John Drummond - died Replaced by Thomas Leslie 1743	
Perthshire (seat 1/1)	Lord John Murray	
Peterborough (seat 1/2)	The Earl Fitzwilliam - raised to the peerage Replaced by Armstead Parker 1742	Whig; Tory
Peterborough (seat 2/2)	Sir Edward Wortley Montagu	Whig
Petersfield (seat 1/2)	John Jolliffe	
Petersfield (seat 2/2)	Francis Fane	
Plymouth (seat 1/2)	Arthur Stert	
Plymouth (seat 2/2)	Lord Vere Beauclerk	
Plympton Erle (seat 1/2)	Richard Edgcumbe	Whig
Plympton Erle (seat 2/2)	Thomas Clutterbuck - died Replaced by Richard Edgcumbe 1742 - raised to the peerage Replaced by The Lord Sundon 1742	
Pontefract (seat 1/2)	George Morton Pitt	
Pontefract (seat 2/2)	John Monckton	
Poole (seat 1/2)	Joseph Gulston	
Poole (seat 2/2)	Thomas Missing	
Portsmouth (seat 1/2)	Martin Bladen - died Replaced by Thomas Gore 1746	
Portsmouth (seat 2/2)	Philip Cavendish - died Replaced by Sir Charles Hardy 1743 - died Replaced by Isaac Townsend 1744	
Preston (seat 1/2)	Nicholas Fazakerley	
Preston (seat 2/2)	James Shuttleworth	
== Q ==
Queenborough (seat 1/2)	Richard Evans	
Queenborough (seat 2/2)	Thomas Newnham	
== R ==
Radnor Boroughs	see New Radnor Boroughs	...
Radnorshire (seat 1/1)	Sir Humphrey Howorth	
Reading (seat 1/2)	John Blagrave	
Reading (seat 2/2)	William Strode	
Reigate (seat 1/2)	James Cocks	
Reigate (seat 2/2)	Philip Yorke	Whig.
Renfrewshire (seat 1/1)	Alexander Cuninghame - died Replaced by William Mure 1742	
Richmond (Yorkshire) (seat 1/2)	John Yorke	
Richmond (Yorkshire) (seat 2/2)	Sir Conyers Darcy	
Ripon (seat 1/2)	William Aislabie	Tory
Ripon (seat 2/2)	Henry Vane	Whig
Rochester (seat 1/2)	Edward Vernon - sat for Ipswich; Replaced by David Polhill 1743	
Rochester (seat 2/2)	Nicholas Haddock - died Replaced by Sir Chaloner Ogle 1746	
Ross-shire (seat 1/1)	Charles Ross - died Replaced by Sir Harry Munro 1746	
Roxburghshire (seat 1/1)	John Rutherfurd - took office Replaced by William Douglas 1742	
Rutland (seat 1/2)	James Noel	
Rutland (seat 2/2)	John Finch	
Rye (seat 1/2)	Phillips Gybbon	
Rye (seat 2/2)	Admiral Sir John Norris	
== S ==
St Albans (seat 1/2)	James West	
St Albans (seat 2/2)	Thomas Ashby - died Replaced by Hans Stanley 1743	
St Germans (seat 1/2)	John Hynde Cotton	
St Germans (seat 2/2)	James Newsham	
St Ives (seat 1/2)	John Bristow|	
St Ives (seat 2/2)	Lieutenant-Colonel Gregory Beake	
St Mawes (seat 1/2)	Robert Nugent	
St Mawes (seat 2/2)	James Douglas	
Salisbury (seat 1/2)	Sir Jacob Bouverie	
Salisbury (seat 2/2)	Sir Edward Seymour	
Saltash (seat 1/2)	John Clevland - took office Replaced by Stamp Brooksbank 1743	
Saltash (seat 2/2)	Thomas Corbett	
Sandwich (seat 1/2)	Josiah Burchett	Whig
Sandwich (seat 2/2)	Sir George Oxenden	Whig
Scarborough (seat 1/2)	William Thompson - died Replaced by Edwin Lascelles 1744	Tory
Scarborough (seat 2/2)	William Osbaldeston	
Seaford (seat 1/2)	Sir William Hall Gage - died Replaced by William Gage 1744	
Seaford (seat 2/2)	William Hay	
Selkirkshire (seat 1/1)	John Murray	
Shaftesbury (seat 1/2)	Peter Walter	
Shaftesbury (seat 2/2)	Charles Ewer - died Replaced by George Pitt 1742	
Shrewsbury (seat 1/2)	William Kinaston	
Shrewsbury (seat 2/2)	Sir Richard Corbet	
Shropshire (seat 1/2)	Sir John Astley	
Shropshire (seat 2/2)	Richard Lyster	
Shoreham	see New Shoreham	...
Somerset (seat 1/2)	Henry William Portman	
Somerset (seat 2/2)	Thomas Prowse	
Southampton (seat 1/2)	Peter Delmé	
Southampton (seat 2/2)	Edward Gibbon Senior	
Southwark (seat 1/2)	Ralph Thrale	
Southwark (seat 2/2)	Thomas Inwen - died Replaced by Alexander Hume 1743	
Stafford (seat 1/2)	Hon. William Chetwynd	
Stafford (seat 2/2)	The Viscount Chetwynd	
Staffordshire (seat 1/2)	Sir Walter Wagstaffe Bagot	Tory
Staffordshire (seat 2/2)	William Leveson Gower	Tory
Stamford (seat 1/2)	William Noel	
Stamford (seat 2/2)	John Proby	
Steyning (seat 1/2)	Hitch Younge	
Steyning (seat 2/2)	Charles Eversfield	
Stirling Burghs (seat 1/1)	James Erskine	
Stirlingshire (seat 1/1)	Lord George Graham - died Replaced by Thomas Erskine 1747	
Stockbridge (seat 1/2)	Charles Churchill	
Stockbridge (seat 2/2)	Matthew Lamb	
Sudbury (seat 1/2)	Thomas Fonnereau	
Sudbury (seat 2/2)	Carteret Leathes	
Suffolk (seat 1/2)	Sir Jermyn Davers - died Replaced by John Affleck 1743	
Suffolk (seat 2/2)	Sir Cordell Firebrace	
Surrey (seat 1/2)	Arthur Onslow	
Surrey (seat 2/2)	The Lord Baltimore 1742	
Sussex (seat 1/2)	Henry Pelham	Whig
Sussex (seat 2/2)	James Butler - died Replaced by Earl of Middlesex 1742	Whig.
Sutherland (seat 1/1)	James St Clair	
== T ==
Tain Burghs (seat 1/1)	Charles Erskine - election void Replaced by Robert Craigie 1742	
Tamworth (seat 1/2)	Lord John Sackville	
Tamworth (seat 2/2)	John Floyer	
Taunton (seat 1/2)	Sir John Chapman	Whig
Taunton (seat 2/2)	John Buck - died Replaced by Percy Wyndham O'Brien 1745	Tory; Whig
Tavistock (seat 1/2)	Hon. Charles Fane	Whig
Tavistock (seat 2/2)	Lord Sherard Manners - died Replaced by The Viscount Limerick 1742	
Tewkesbury (seat 1/2)	The Viscount Gage	
Tewkesbury (seat 2/2)	John Martin	
Thetford (seat 1/2)	Lord Augustus FitzRoy - died Replaced by Lord Henry Beauclerk 1741	
Thetford (seat 2/2)	Charles FitzRoy	
Thirsk (seat 2/2)	Frederick Meinhardt Frankland	
Thirsk (seat 1/2)	Sir Thomas Frankland	
Tiverton (seat 1/2)	Arthur Arscott	
Tiverton (seat 2/2)	Dudley Ryder	
Totnes (seat 2/2)	Sir Joseph Danvers, Bt	
Totnes (seat 1/2)	Sir Charles Wills - died Replaced by Sir John Strange 1742	
Tregony (seat 1/2)	Henry Penton	
Tregony (seat 2/2)	Thomas Watts - died Replaced by George Cooke 1742	
Truro (seat 1/2)	Charles Hamilton	
Truro (seat 2/2)	James Hammond - died Replaced by Edward Boscawen 1742	
== W ==
Wallingford (seat 1/2)	John Bance	
Wallingford (seat 2/2)	John Rush	
Wareham (seat 1/2)	Henry Drax	
Wareham (seat 2/2)	John Pitt	
Warwick (seat 1/2)	Wills Hill	
Warwick (seat 2/2)	Henry Archer	
Warwickshire (seat 1/2)	Sir Charles Mordaunt	
Warwickshire (seat 2/2)	Edward Digby - died Replaced by William Craven 1746	
Wells (seat 1/2)	Francis Gwyn	
Wells (seat 2/2)	George Speke 1735	
Wendover (seat 1/2)	The Earl Verney	
Wendover (seat 2/2)	John Hampden	
Wenlock (seat 2/2)	Sir Brian Broughton Delves - died Replaced by Isaac Hawkins Browne 1744	
Wenlock (seat 1/2)	Brooke Forester	
Weobley (seat 1/2)	Lieutenant-Colonel The Lord Carpenter	
Weobley (seat 2/2)	The Viscount Palmerston	
West Looe (seat 1/2)	Benjamin Keene	
West Looe (seat 2/2)	Sir Charles Wager - died Replaced by John Frederick 1743	Whig.
Westbury (seat 1/2)	Hon. George Evans	
Westbury (seat 2/2)	Joseph Townsend	
Westminster (seat 1/2)	Sir Charles Wager - election void Replaced by Lord Perceval 1741	Whig; Tory
Westminster (seat 2/2)	The Lord Sundon - election void Replaced by Charles Edwin 1741	Whig; Tory
Westmorland (seat 1/2)	Sir Philip Musgrave	
Westmorland (seat 2/2)	Daniel Wilson	
Weymouth and Melcombe Regis (seat 1/4)	John Tucker	
Weymouth and Melcombe Regis (seat 2/4)	Joseph Damer	
Weymouth and Melcombe Regis (seat 3/4)	John Raymond	
Weymouth and Melcombe Regis (seat 4/4)	James Steuart	
Whitchurch (seat 2/2)	John Selwyn	
Whitchurch (seat 1/2)	John Wallop - sat for Andover; Replaced by William Sloper 1742 - died Replaced by Charles Clarke 1743 - took office Replaced by Thomas Wentworth 1743	
Wigan (seat 1/2)	Sir Roger Bradshaigh - died Replaced by Richard Clayton 1747	
Wigan (seat 2/2)	The Earl of Barrymore	
Wigtown Burghs (seat 1/1)	William Stewart (c 1706–1748)	
Wigtownshire (seat 1/1)	William Dalrymple	
Wilton (seat 1/2)	Robert Sawyer Herbert	
Wilton (seat 2/2)	William Herbert	
Wiltshire (seat 1/2)	Sir Robert Long	Tory
Wiltshire (seat 2/2)	Edward Popham	
Winchelsea (seat 1/2)	The Viscount Doneraile	
Winchelsea (seat 2/2)	Thomas Orby Hunter	
Winchester (seat 1/2)	George Brydges	
Winchester (seat 2/2)	William Powlett	
Windsor	see New Windsor	...
Woodstock	see New Woodstock	...
Wootton Bassett (seat 1/2)	Robert Neale	
Wootton Bassett (seat 2/2)	John Harvey-Thursby	
Worcester (seat 1/2)	Thomas Winnington - died Replaced by Thomas Vernon 1746	
Worcester (seat 2/2)	Samuel Sandys - raised to the peerage Replaced by Sir Henry Harpur 1744	
Worcestershire (seat 1/2)	Sir Herbert Pakington, Bt	
Worcestershire (seat 2/2)	Edmund Pytts I	
Wycombe	see Chipping Wycombe	...
== Y ==
Yarmouth (Isle of Wight) (seat 1/2)	Thomas Gibson - died Replaced by Robert Carteret 1744	
Yarmouth (Isle of Wight) (seat 2/2)	Colonel Maurice Bocland	
Yarmouth (Norfolk)	see Great Yarmouth	...
York (seat 1/2)	Godfrey Wentworth	
York (seat 2/2)	Edward Thompson - died Replaced by George Fox 1742	
Yorkshire (seat 1/2)	Sir Miles Stapylton, Bt	
Yorkshire (seat 2/2)	Viscount Morpeth - died Replaced by Charles Cholmley Turner 1742	

== By-elections ==
- List of Great Britain by-elections (1734–54)

== See also ==
- 1741 British general election
- List of parliaments of Great Britain
- Unreformed House of Commons
