= William Bowles (1686–1748) =

English glass manufacturer and Whig politician

William Bowles (11 February 1686 – 14 May 1748), of Burford, Shropshire, was an English glass manufacturer and Whig politician who sat in the House of Commons for more than 20 years from 1727 to 1748.

== Early life ==
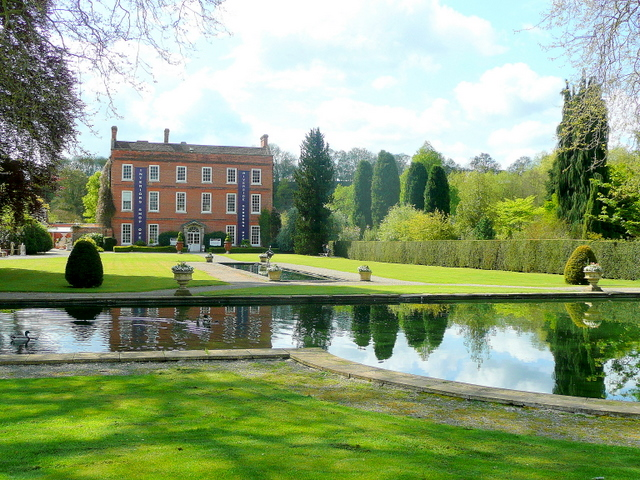
Burford House

Bowles was the eldest son of Phineas Bowles of St. Michael's, Crooked Lane, London and Loughborough House, Lambeth, and his wife Margaret Dockwra, daughter of William Dockwra, merchant of London. When his father died in 1718 he became the proprietor of the Vauxhall glassworks in London, the major glass works in the country. In 1720 he bought the Burford Estate in Shropshire, where he built Burford House in 1728. He had purchased Burford on the understanding that the estate contained a deer park, but afterwards he discovered that it did not, and undertook six years of litigation. He was a Director of the South Sea Company from 1724 to 1739.

== Career ==
Bowles was returned as Member of Parliament for Bridport at the 1727 British general election. He voted with the Administration on the Hessians in 1730, on the army in 1732, and on the repeal of the Septennial Act in 1734. He voted against the administration on the civil list in 1729 and on the Excise Bill in 1733. He also opposed a bill against ‘the infamous practice of stockjobbing’ in 1733.

At the 1734 British general election Bowles was returned as MP for both Bridport and Bewdley where he had acquired a controlling interest, but chose to sit for Bridport again and brought his brother Phineas in for Bewdley. He married Sarah Cook, the widow of William Cook on 29 January 1736, and was appointed Recorder of Bewdley in 1738. In Parliament, he spoke against a proposal to reduce the interest on the national debt in 1737 and did not take part in the division on the Spanish convention in 1739. He voted for the place bill in 1740. In 1740 he also spoke on behalf of Carolina in opposing the inclusion of rice among prohibited exports.

Bowles was again returned for both Bridport and Bewdley at the 1741 British general election and this time chose to sit for Bewdley. He voted with the Administration on the chairman of the elections committee in December 1741, but was absent from an important division on 21 January 1742, when he ‘sat diverting himself all night at Garraway's Coffee House’. He was a member of the committee of inquiry into Walpole's conduct, and though considered a supporter of Walpole, he not only voted but also spoke for the bill to indemnify anyone who gave evidence against Walpole. He was returned again at Bewdley at the 1747 British general election.

== Death and legacy ==
Bowles died on 14 May 1748 aged 62, but left no children. He bequeathed Burford to his sister Lady Rushout and it remained in the Rushout family.

Parliament of Great Britain
Preceded by Peter Walter; Sir Dewey Bulkeley	Member of Parliament for Bridport; 1727 – 1741; With: James Pelham 1727–30; John Jewkes 1730–34; Solomon Ashley 1734–41; George Richards from 1741	Succeeded by Viscount Deerhurst; George Richards
Preceded by Phineas Bowles	Member of Parliament for Bewdley; 1741 – 1748	Succeeded by William Lyttelton
