= George Coventry, 6th Earl of Coventry =

British peer and Tory politician

George William Coventry, 6th Earl Coventry
- George William, 6th Earl of Coventry by Sir Joshua Reynolds, 1761 (David Mannings, Sir Joshua Reynolds: A Complete Catalogue of His Paintings, no. 433)
- Born: April 26, 1722; Winchester, Hampshire
- Died: September 3, 1809; Piccadilly, London
- Resting place: Croome d'Abitot, Worcestershire
- Spouse(s): Maria Gunning (married 1752-1760); Barbara St John (married 1764-1804)
- Children: Elizabeth Ann Coventry (1753-1756); Maria Alicia Coventry (1754-1784); Ann Margaret Coventry (1757-1784); George William, 7th Earl Coventry (1758-1831); John Coventry (1765-1829); Barbara Coventry (1776-76); Thomas William Coventry (1778-1816)
- Parents: William Coventry, 5th Earl (1676-1751) (father); Elizabeth Allen (c1700-1738) (mother)

George William Coventry, 6th Earl of Coventry (26 April 1722 – 3 September 1809), styled Viscount Deerhurst from 1744 to 1751, was a British peer and Tory politician.

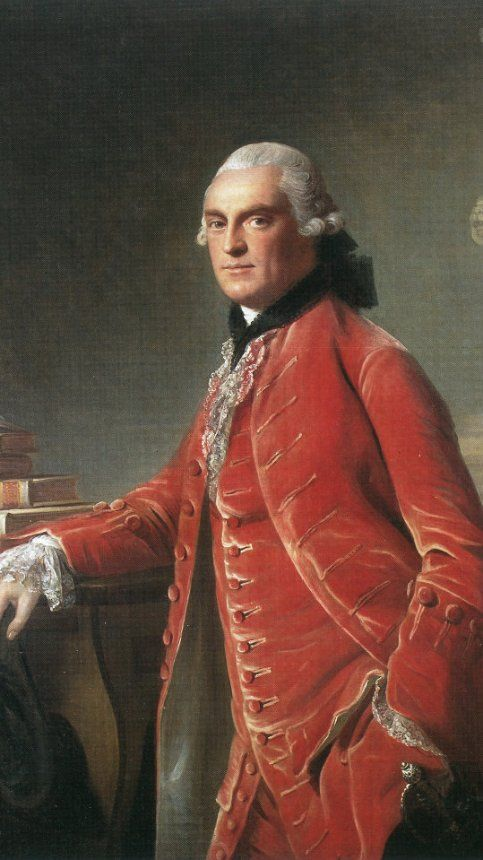
George William, 6th Earl of Coventry by Alan Ramsay, 1764 (Croome Court, National Trust # 170909)

== Early life ==
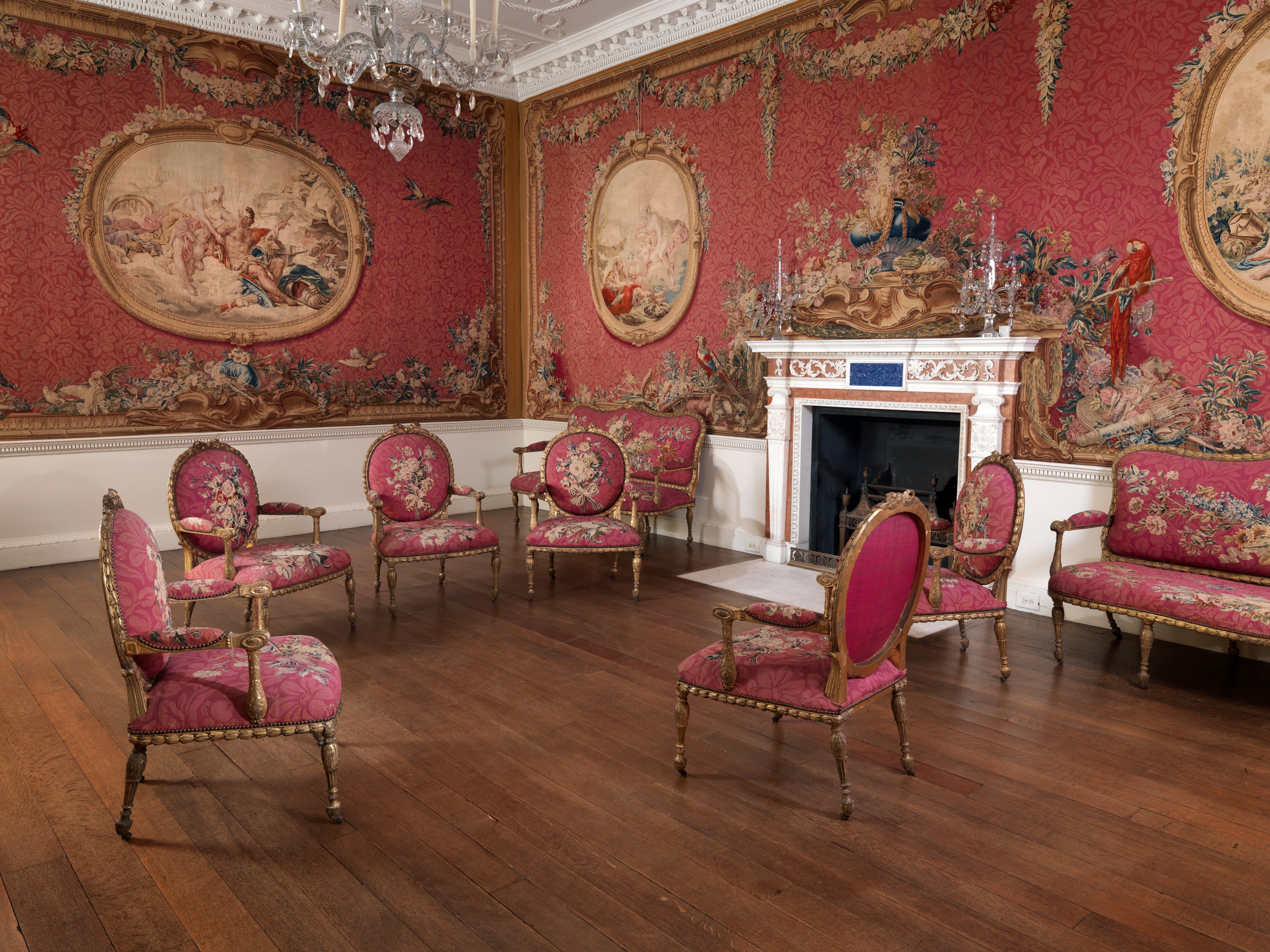
Tapestry Room from Croome Court (Metropolitan Museum of Art)

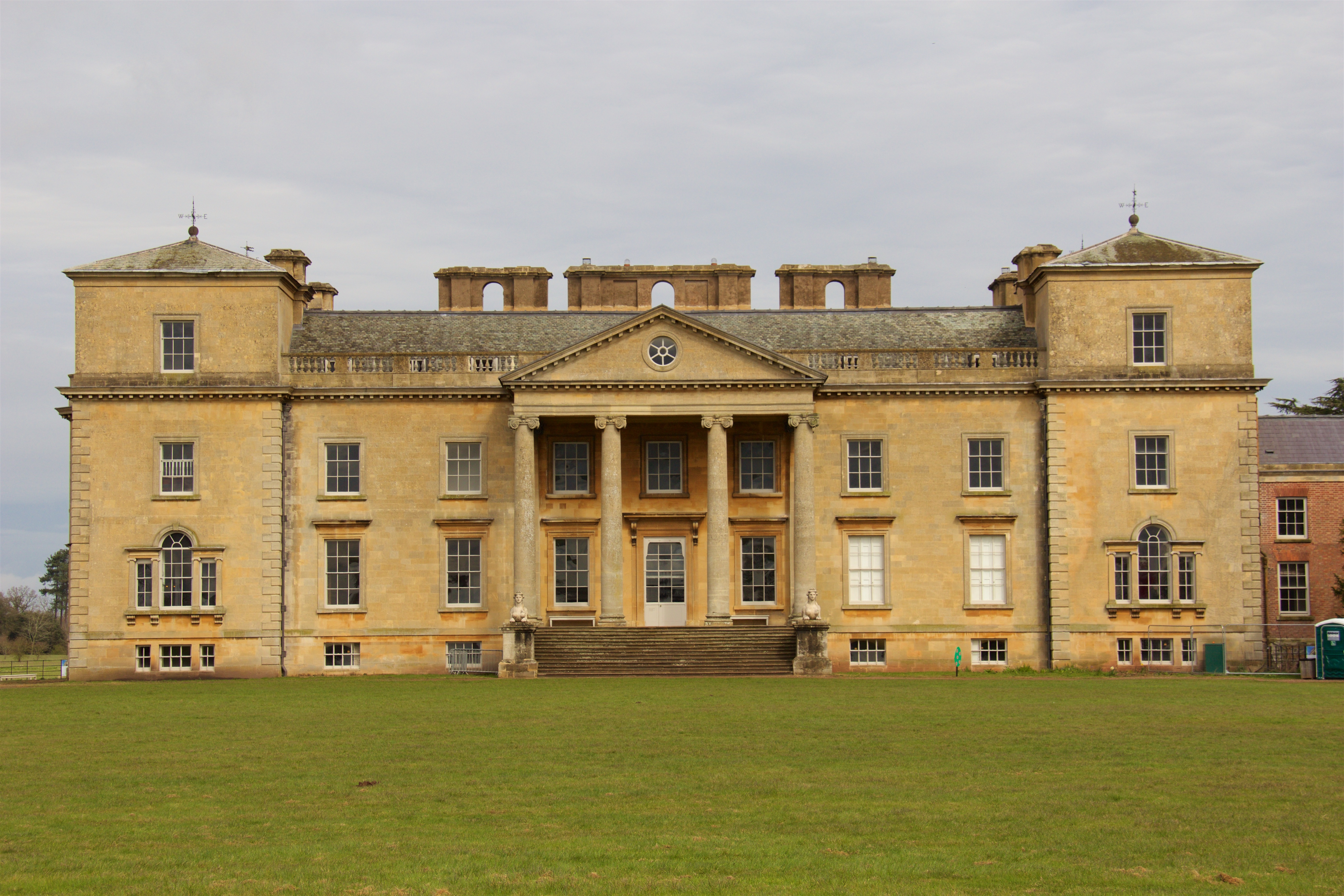
Croome Court

Coventry was the second but eldest surviving son of William Coventry, 5th Earl of Coventry, and his wife Elizabeth (née Allen), and was educated at Winchester and University College, Oxford.

== Career ==
He was elected to the House of Commons for Bridport in 1744 (succeeding his elder brother Viscount Deerhurst), a seat he held until 1747, and then represented Worcestershire from 1747 to 1751. The latter year he succeeded his father in the earldom and entered the House of Lords. He also served as Lord Lieutenant of Worcestershire from 1751 to 1808, and was a Lord of the Bedchamber to George II from 1752 to 1760 and to George III from 1760 to 1770.

In 1782 he gave a powerful speech in the House of Lords, probably his best speech, in which he stressed the folly of continuing the war with America:

There is not a Country gent, there is not a Manufacturer, there is not a tradesman, there is not a farmer who does not condemn, shall I say, who does not, every idea of the American war. They speak of it with one Voice as the Consummation of all Folly, Obstinacy and Madness. [...] I do most seriously recommend to his Majesty's ministers to advert with all their Wisdom now while Time is to that great and important object. If they do not I will be bold to say that America dependent or independent will equally be the bane of Great Britain.

The Earl inherited Croome Court, near Pershore, Worcestershire from his father and commissioned Capability Brown to redesign the setting of the house and surrounding parkland. He asked Robert Adam to reimagine Croome Court and filled his home with works commissioned from Richard Wilson, Allan Ramsay, Joseph Rose, John Cheere, John Wildsmith, Antonio Zucchi, Joseph Wilton, Sefferin Alken, and Joshua Reynolds. He also commissioned a magnificent set of tapestries from the Gobelins factory in France (now in the Metropolitan Museum).

== Private life ==
'Miss [Williams] and Peeping Tom of Coventry' (George William Coventry, 6th Earl of Coventry), March 1, 1775

Lord Coventry married firstly Maria, daughter of Colonel John Gunning, in 1752. She died in 1760, having produced a son and 3 daughters:

- Lady Elizabeth Ann Coventry (died in infancy)
- Lady Mary Alicia Coventry; married Sir Andrew Baynton-Rolt 2nd Bt. Had issue.
- Lady Anne Margaret Coventry; married firstly Hon. Edward Foley, son of Thomas Foley, 1st Baron Foley (1716–1777). Married secondly Capt. Samuel Wright.
- George William Coventry, 7th Earl of Coventry; married firstly Lady Catherine Henley, daughter of Robert Henley, 1st Earl of Northington. Married secondly Peggy Pitches, daughter of Sir Abraham Pitches. Had issue from his second marriage.

He married secondly the Hon. Barbara, daughter of John St John, 11th Baron St John of Bletso, in 1764, with whom he had a further 2 sons and a daughter (who died as an infant). Lady Coventry died in 1804.

Lord Coventry survived his second wife by five years and died in September 1809, aged 87. He was succeeded in his titles by his son from his first marriage, George Coventry, 7th Earl of Coventry. His youngest son was Thomas William Coventry.

The Earl was a connoisseur of the rare and unusual and was passionate about the arts, architecture, science, landscape, agriculture and garden design. He was described by Horace Walpole as a 'grave young lord' and one who was intolerant of vulgarity.

Lord Coventry was a great player of the gambling game faro and ran bank for an exclusive gambling set from Croome Court. He and a group of aristocratic players including Charles Bingham, Lord Montfort and Lord Poulett were members of the gambling syndicate and agreed to cede a portion of their winnings to the courtesan Kitty Fisher in exchange for her sexual favours that normally ran at £100 a night. The countess, Maria, was one of the most celebrated beauties in London and she and Kitty quickly became rivals for Lord Coventry's affections. Maria was also a leader of fashion and when Kitty found out that Maria's tailor had made her a new design of riding habit, she cajoled Lord Coventry into giving her one of the same cut. In 1759, the two ladies went riding the same day in St James's Park; Giustiniana Wynne, an Anglo-Venetian writer and friend of Casanova, reported the encounter some years later:

The other day they ran into each other in the park and Lady Coventry asked Kitty the name of the dressmaker who had made her dress. Kitty Fisher answered she had better "ask Lord Coventry as he had given her the dress as a gift." The altercation continued with Lady Coventry calling her an impertinent woman, and Kitty replying that she would have to accept this insult because Maria became her "social superior" on marrying Lord Coventry, but she was going to marry a Lord herself just to be able to answer back.

By 1761 Kitty had been replaced in Lord Coventry's affections by Mary 'Polly' Davis - a courtesan reputedly born in a wheelbarrow in Covent Garden but described by Harris's List of Covent Garden Ladies in 1764 as 'a delicate genteel lady of the first fashion and price ... her connections are mostly with gentlemen of rank and fortune ... never less than ten guineas and half a crown for her servant.' This rivalry led to a well-publicised scuffle between Kitty and Polly when they met with Lord Coventry in Ranelagh Gardens.

In February 1775, Town and Country magazine published a hit piece on the Earl dubbing him 'the Peeping Tom of Coventry' - a nickname that stuck - alleging that he had spied through a peep-hole in a tavern wall on 'a very intimate acquaintance' in an embarrassing position. It also outed him as having a new mistress, Miss Williams, the daughter of a penniless clergyman from Brecknockshire who had fallen on hard times having run away from home and given birth to an illegitimate baby.

== Gallery ==
George William, 6th Earl Coventry by Jean-Baptiste Perronneau, 1773 (Sotheby's)

George William, 6th Earl of Coventry by Nathaniel Dance Holland, 1774 (Worcester Guildhall)

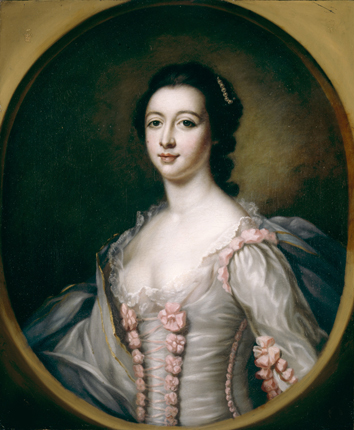
Maria Coventry, Countess of Coventry (after Francis Cotes)

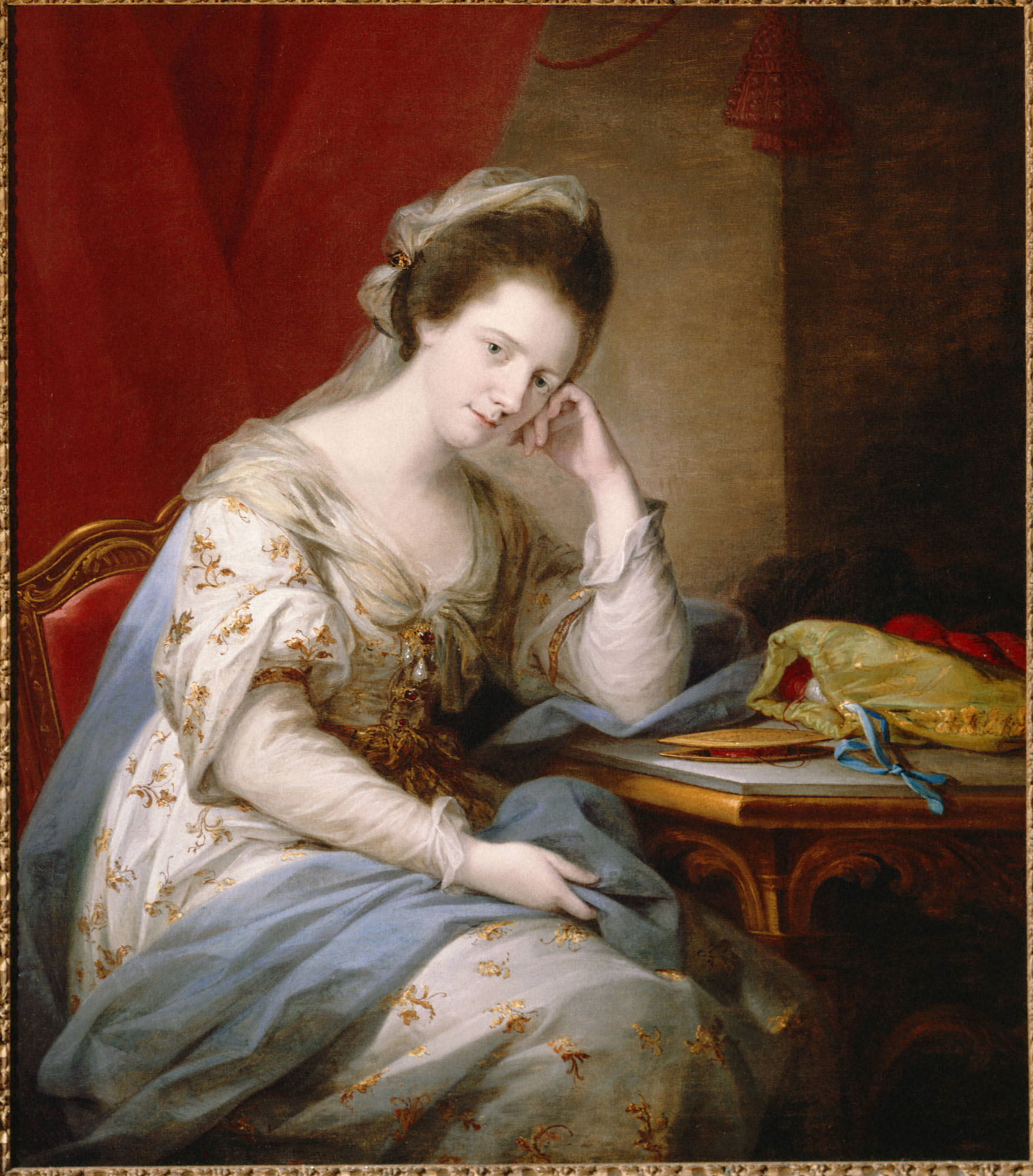
Angelica Kauffmann, Barbara St. John Bletso, Countess of Coventry, Princeton University Art Museum, the second wife of the Earl of Coventry

Kitty Fisher as Cleopatra by Sir Joshua Reynolds (Kenwood House)

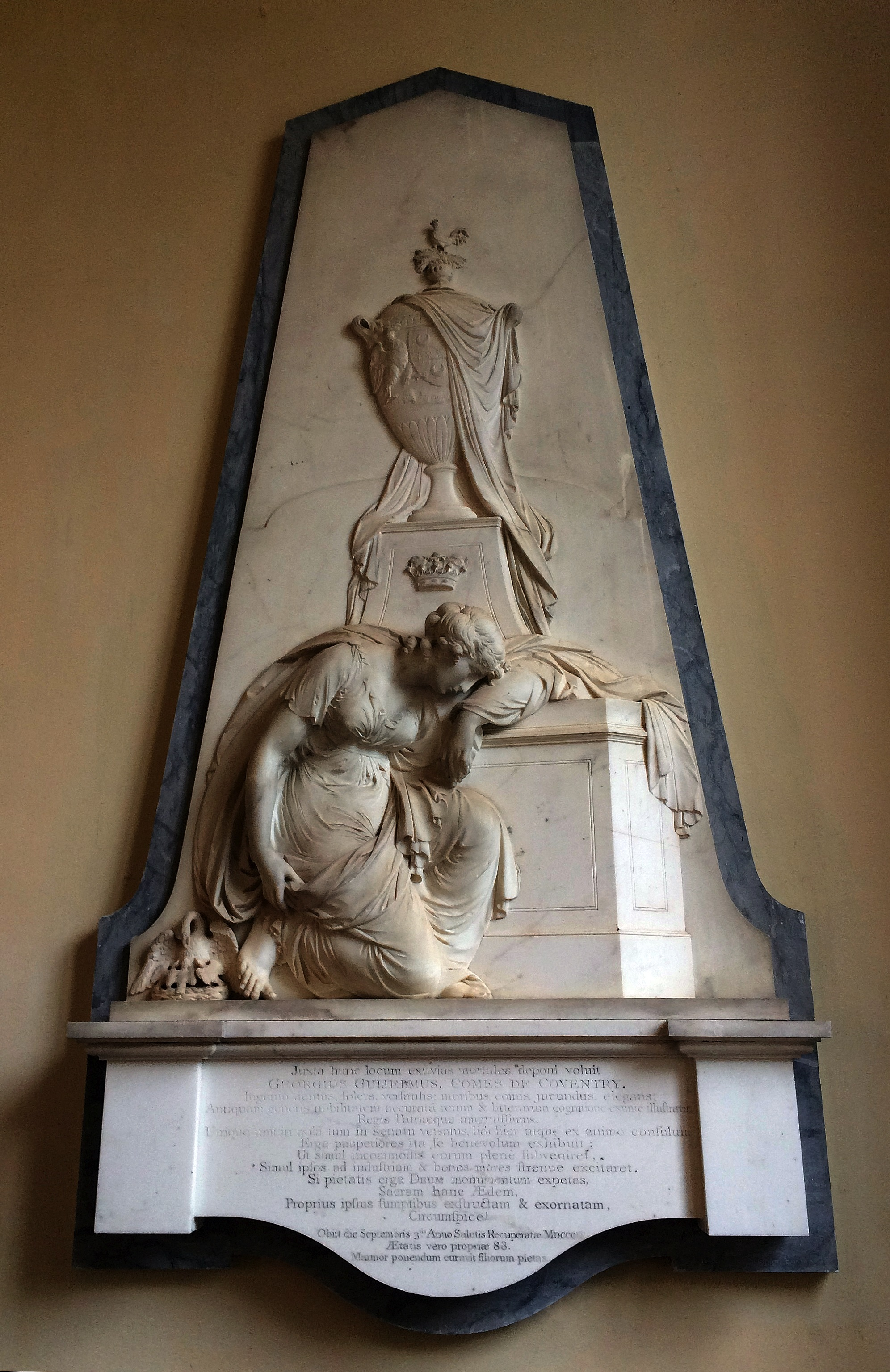
Memorial to the 6th Earl of Coventry in the church at Croome Court

== See also ==
- Broadway Tower, a folly built for Lady Coventry in 1798-99.
- Croome Court

Parliament of Great Britain
Preceded by George Richards; Viscount Deerhurst	Member of Parliament for Bridport; 1744–1747; With: George Richards 1744–1746; Thomas Grenville 1746–1747; James Grenville 1747	Succeeded by James Grenville; John Frederick Pinney
Preceded by Edmund Pytts; Edmund Lechmere	Member of Parliament for Worcestershire; 1747–1751; With: Edmund Pytts	Succeeded by Edmund Pytts; John Bulkeley Coventry
Honorary titles
Preceded by The Earl of Coventry	Lord Lieutenant of Worcestershire; 1751–1808	Succeeded by Viscount Deerhurst
Peerage of England
Preceded by William Coventry	Earl of Coventry; 1751–1809	Succeeded by George William Coventry
