= George Coventry, 7th Earl of Coventry =

British peer

The Right Honourable The Earl of Coventry

Lord Lieutenant of Worcestershire
- In office 1808–1831
- Preceded by: The Earl of Coventry
- Succeeded by: The Lord Foley

Personal details
- Born: George William Coventry; 25 April 1758
- Died: 26 March 1831 (aged 72); Piccadilly
- Spouse: Lady Catherine Henley (m. 1777; died 1779) Peggy Pitches (m. 1783)
- Relations: Elizabeth Hamilton, 1st Baroness Hamilton of Hameldon (aunt)
- Parent(s): George Coventry, 6th Earl of Coventry; Maria Gunning
- Education: Christ Church, Oxford

George William Coventry, 7th Earl of Coventry (25 April 1758 – 26 March 1831), styled Viscount Deerhurst until 1809, was a British peer and Member of Parliament.

== Early life ==
Coventry was born on 25 April 1758. He was the eldest son of George Coventry, 6th Earl of Coventry and, his first wife, Maria Gunning. After his mother's death in 1760 from mercury poisoning from toxins in her beauty regimen, his father married Hon. Barbara St John (a daughter of the 11th Baron St John of Bletso), in 1764, with whom he had a further two sons and a daughter.

His maternal grandparents were William Coventry, 5th Earl of Coventry and Elizabeth Allen. His paternal grandparents were Col. John Gunning of Castle Coote, County Roscommon, and Hon. Bridget Bourke (a daughter of the 6th Viscount Mayo). His maternal aunt, the Anglo-Irish beauty Elizabeth Gunning, was lady-in-waiting to Queen Charlotte, and the wife of James Hamilton, 6th Duke of Hamilton and John Campbell, 5th Duke of Argyll.

Coventry matriculated at Christ Church, Oxford, on 5 January 1776.

== Career ==
On 7 May 1776, Coventry was commissioned an ensign in the 64th Regiment of Foot. On 21 January 1777, he became a lieutenant in the 17th Regiment of Light Dragoons.

He succeeded his father as Lord Lieutenant of Worcestershire in 1808, and upon his death on 3 September 1809, as the 7th Earl of Coventry. He also served as Recorder of Worcester and High Steward of Tewkesbury.

== Personal life ==
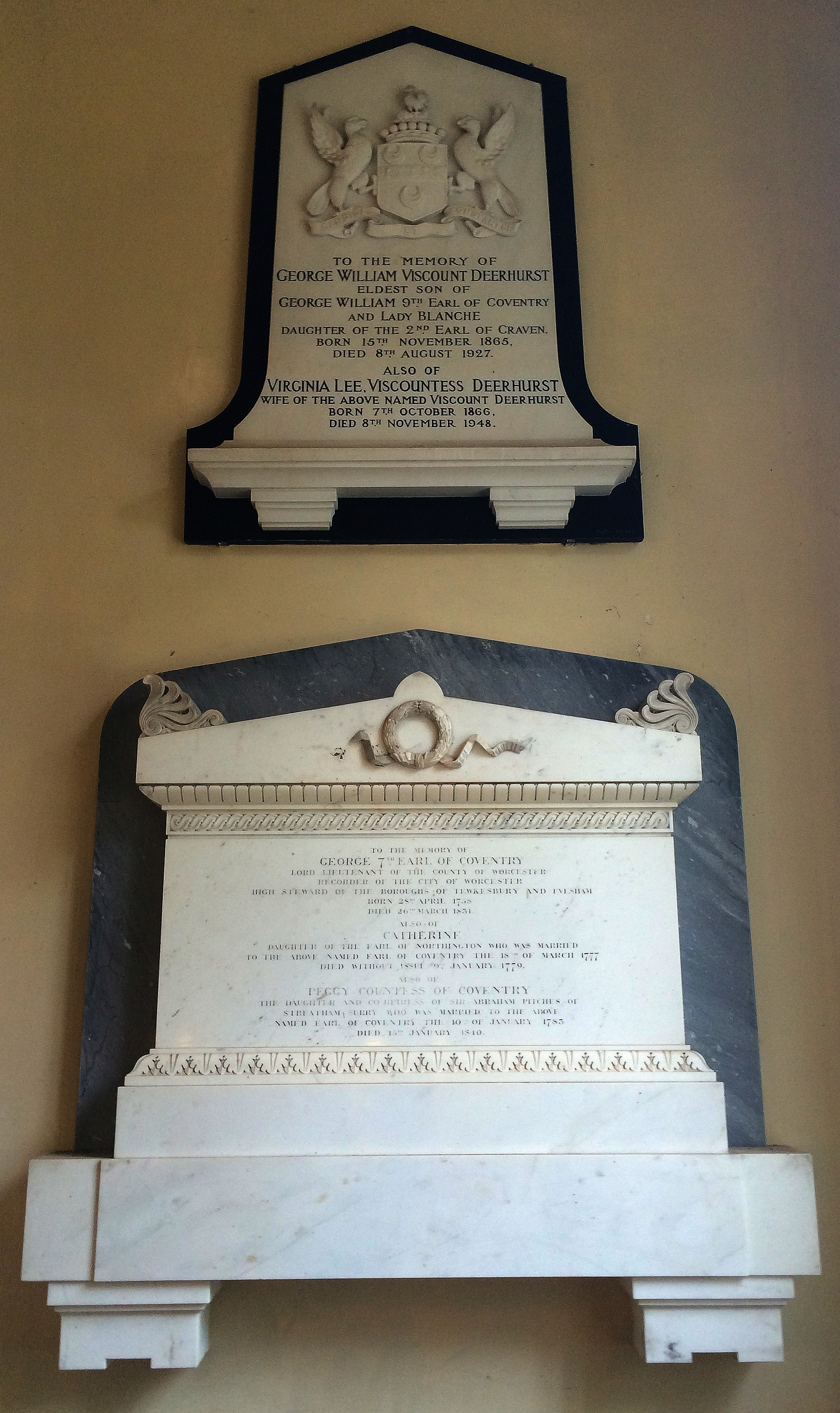
Memorials to Viscount Deerhurst, eldest son of the 9th Earl of Coventry, and the 7th Earl of Coventry (1758–1831) in the church at Croome Court

On 18 March 1777, he eloped to Gretna Green with Lady Catherine Henley, daughter of the Earl of Northington, leading to a long-standing estrangement from his father, the 6th Earl. This estrangement was strengthened when the 6th Earl was informed of a rumour that his son, had fathered a child with Lady Henley, and was fostered by distant relatives. This rumour was supported by evidence that the 6th Earl’s distant relatives had taken in a newborn girl, no verification was ever made about whether this child was in fact the progeny of the 7th Earl and Lady Henley, however the child whose surname was Collins was recorded having connections to minor aristocracy, and many other illegitimate children of notable royalty and nobility, Ms Collins was also recorded as the mother of a child who would marry into the Coventry family. However a lot of this is still not confirmed fact as DNA analysis did not exist at this time. Forbidden to return home, Coventry spent much time with his friend Sir Richard Worsley, 7th Baronet, at Appuldurcombe House, Isle of Wight. Lady Catherine died on 9 January 1779. He had an affair with Lady Worsley and was later involved in her scandalous elopement with George Bisset in 1781, and the subsequent trial.

In 1783, Coventry married Peggy Pitches (c. 1760–1840) at St George's, Hanover Square. Peggy was the daughter of brandy merchant Sir Abraham Pitches and Jane Hassel. They had five sons and six daughters, one son and one daughter dying young, including:

- George William Coventry, 8th Earl of Coventry (1784–1843), who married Lady Emma Lygon, daughter of William Lygon, 1st Earl Beauchamp, in 1808. After her death, he married Lady Mary Beauclerk, daughter of Aubrey Beauclerk, 6th Duke of St Albans, in 1811.
- Lady Augusta Maria Coventry (c. 1786–1865), who married Lt.-Gen. Sir Willoughby Cotton in 1806.
- Lady Barbara Coventry (15 July 1799 – 1838), who married Lt.-Col. Alexander Charles Craufurd, son of Sir James Gregan-Craufurd, 2nd Baronet, in 1818.
- Lady Sophia Catherine Coventry (29 November 1801 – 29 March 1875), who married Sir Roger Gresley, 8th Baronet, in 1821. After Sir Roger's death, she married Rev. Lt.-Col. Sir Henry William Des Voeux, 3rd Baronet.
- Hon. William James Coventry (1 January 1797 – 1877), who married Mary Laing, daughter of James Laing, in 1821.

Lord Coventry died on 26 March 1831 at Coventry House, Piccadilly. Upon his death in 1831, he was succeeded by his son, George.

Honorary titles
Preceded by The Earl of Coventry	Lord Lieutenant of Worcestershire; 1808–1831	Succeeded by The Lord Foley
Peerage of England
Preceded by George Coventry	Earl of Coventry; 1809–1831	Succeeded by George Coventry
