= Thomas Coventry (politician) =

British Member of Parliament (c. 1713–1797)

Thomas Coventry (c. 1713–1797) was a British lawyer, financier and politician who sat in the House of Commons between 1754 and 1780.

He was born about 1713, the son of Thomas Coventry, a Russian merchant and the brother of William Coventry, 5th Earl of Coventry, and his wife Mary Green of Hambleton, Buckinghamshire. Coventry was educated at Magdalen Hall, Oxford in 1728, entered the Inner Temple in 1732 and was called to the bar in 1735. He married Margaret Savage, daughter of Thomas Savage of Elmley Castle, Worcestershire, in 1743.

In 1751, Coventry became a Director of the South Sea Company. In 1754, he was returned as Member of Parliament for Bridport and was returned again in 1761. He became bencher of Inner Temple in 1766, and deputy governor of the South Sea Company in 1768. In 1768, he was re-elected MP for Bridport. In 1771, he became sub-governor of the South Sea Company, retaining the post until 1794. He was returned again to represent Bridport in 1774.

In 1777, he became reader, and in 1778 treasurer of Inner Temple. The same year, he succeeded to the North Cray estate of his friend and kinsman, Rev. William Hetherington, where around 1780, he hired Capability Brown to landscape the parkland.

Coventry died at his house in Sergeants Inn on 21 May 1797 and was buried at Temple Church. He willed all his assets to his godson Thomas William Coventry (1778-1816), the youngest son of 6th Earl of Coventry.

Parliament of Great Britain
Preceded by John Frederick Pinney; James Grenville	Member of Parliament for Bridport; 1754–1790; With: John Frederick Pinney; Sir Gerard Napier, Bt; Benjamin Way; Sambrooke Freeman; Hon. Lucius Cary 1774-1780	Succeeded by Thomas Scott; Richard Beckford
