= James Pelham =

British politician (c.1683–1761)

Lieutenant colonel James Pelham (c. 1683 – 27 December 1761) was a British politician. A second cousin of Henry Pelham and the Duke of Newcastle, he acted as Newcastle's political agent in Sussex for most of his political career, sitting in Parliament from 1722 to 1761 on Newcastle's interest. He served as secretary to Frederick, Prince of Wales from 1728 until the Prince's break with the Government in 1737. While he received some sinecures from Newcastle for his political services, he was put to considerable expense in doing so and did not leave a large estate.

== Biography ==
Pelham was the second son of Sir Nicholas Pelham, of Catsfield and Crowhurst. He got a captain's commission in the 8th Dragoons in 1711 and saw military service during the War of the Spanish Succession. He was promoted captain and lieutenant colonel in the 1st Foot Guards in 1716, but subsequently took up a political career, supported by the friendship of Lord Walpole and his second cousin, the Duke of Newcastle.

Pelham served as Newcastle's agent in Hastings during the 1715 and 1722 elections. Newcastle was then Lord Chamberlain, and Pelham was appointed secretary to the Lord Chamberlain in May 1719, retaining the post until his death, although Newcastle vacated the office of Chamberlain in 1724. Newcastle had him returned for Newark in 1722, where Newcastle had a personal electoral interest as lord of the manor of Newark-on-Trent. In the 1727 election, Newcastle put Pelham up as a candidate at both Newark and Bridport, the Admiralty having an interest at the latter. Both were contested, but Pelham was returned in both places, choosing to sit for Newark, where he and Richard Sutton, standing on the Duke of Rutland's interest, had defeated the local businessman Alexander Holden and the Tory Sir Charles Sedley, 1st Baronet. At the coronation of George II in October 1727, he was chosen as one of the barons of the Cinque Ports (representing Hastings) who would bear the canopy over the King and Queen.

In 1728, Pelham entered the household of Frederick, Prince of Wales as the Prince's secretary. At the 1734 election, he and Sutton again beat Holden at Newark with an increased majority. In 1736, Pelham took delivery of an elaborate Baroque gold cup, marked with the ostrich-feather badge of the Prince, from George Wickes; the design was reproduced by John Vardy and was widely imitated. The rupture of the Prince of Wales with the Government rendered Pelham's position in the Prince's household untenable. After he sided with the Government on the subject of the Prince's allowance, he resigned his post as secretary to the Prince in late summer 1737 and was replaced by George Lyttelton.

Newcastle transferred Pelham to stand at Hastings in the 1741 election to relieve him of the election expenses at Newark. Before the election, Pelham wrote to Newcastle asking for relief, noting that he had suffered losses in buying South Sea Company stock for Newcastle, lent the Duke £2,000, and borne his own election expenses for Newark, as a result of which, his estate was mortgaged for £6,000. Newcastle replied expressing his gratitude, and patronage was eventually forthcoming: in 1749, Pelham was granted the post of Deputy Cofferer of the Household, serving under Pelham's nephew, the Earl of Lincoln. A customs post of about £700 p.a., held for him by his nephew John, and a secret service pension of about £500 p.a. helped to repair his fortunes. Pelham still felt anxious about his situation, as both the pension and his office as cofferer were liable to be terminated at a change of Government. After consulting with Newcastle's brother Henry Pelham, he wrote in 1750 asking to convert his secret service pension to one of 21 years chargeable on the Irish revenue. Though this request was refused, Newcastle was successful in mollifying him.

Pelham was a reliable government supporter during the tenure of Henry and Newcastle in power, and continued to manage Newcastle's electoral interests in Sussex, particularly in Hastings, Rye, and Seaford. He also acted as an informal whip for Newcastle's personal supporters in the House of Commons. His health began to fail around 1754, when he resigned the office of Deputy Cofferer. A complex issue of patronage had brought Newcastle into conflict with his ally, the Earl of Hardwicke, over the results of the 1754 election at Mitchell. He failed to respond to Newcastle's summons to the first vote on the petition, on 28 February 1755, which Newcastle unexpectedly lost. The affair threatened to destabilize Newcastle's governing coalition, and he wrote to Pelham again on 2 March, accusing him of personal disloyalty and threatening to turn him out of his seat, was that to prove the case. In fact, it seems to have been Pelham's health that prevented his attendance; he had sold his Sussex estate at Crowhurst a few years previously and moved closer to London to allow him to keep regular attendance in Parliament.

Pelham did not stand again at the 1761 election but retained his secretaryship to the Lord Chamberlain and his secret service pension. He died on 27 December 1761, his estate much impaired by his years of electoral service to Newcastle; Horace Walpole recorded that "Jemmy Pelham is dead and has left his servants what little his servants had left him." He never married and left no children.

Parliament of Great Britain
Preceded by Richard Sutton; Conyers Darcy	Member of Parliament for Newark; 1722–1741; With: Richard Sutton 1722–1737; Lord William Manners 1738–1741	Succeeded by Lord William Manners; Job Staunton Charlton
Preceded by Peter Walter; Dewey Bulkeley	Member of Parliament for Bridport; 1727–1730; With: William Bowles	Succeeded by William Bowles; John Jewkes
Preceded by Sir William Ashburnham; Thomas Pelham	Member of Parliament for Hastings; 1741–1761; With: Andrew Stone	Succeeded by James Brudenell; William Ashburnham
Political offices
New office	Secretary to Frederick, Prince of Wales; 1728–1737	Succeeded by George Lyttelton
Court offices
Preceded by Robert Ord	Deputy Cofferer of the Household; 1749–1754	Succeeded by William Lyttelton
