= John Jewkes (MP) =

British lawyer and Whig politician

John Jewkes (1683–1743) was a British lawyer and Whig politician who sat in the House of Commons between 1730 and 1743.

Jewkes was baptized on 28 April 1683, the eldest son of Humphrey Jewkes of Petworth and his wife Sarah Whitehead, daughter of John Whitehead of Clandon, Surrey. He was educated at Eton College and was admitted at Inner Temple on 15 May 1702 and at Peterhouse, Cambridge on 25 May1702. In 1710, he succeeded to his father's estate. He was admitted at Lincoln's Inn on 21 April 1713.

Jewkes, was returned unopposed as a Whig Member of Parliament for Bridport at a by-election on 20 February 1730. In Parliament he voted with the Administration in all known divisions. After 1733 he was political agent and intelligence gatherer for the Duke of Newcastle in the Petworth area. He did not stand at the 1734 British general election but was returned as MP for Aldborough, the Duke's pocket borough, at a by-election on 19 February 1735. He was returned there again unopposed at the 1741 British general election.

Jewkes died unmarried on 25 September 1743.

Parliament of Great Britain
Preceded by William Bowles; James Pelham	Member of Parliament for Bridport; 1730–1734; With: William Bowles	Succeeded by William Bowles; Solomon Ashley
Preceded by Henry Pelham; William Jessop	Member of Parliament for Aldborough; 1735–1743; With: Andrew Wilkinson	Succeeded by Nathaniel Newnham; Andrew Wilkinson
