= John Strangways =

John Strangways may refer to:

- John Strangways (died 1676) (1636–1676), English politician
- John Strangways (died 1666) (1585–1666), English politician
- John Strangways (died 1716) (1688–1716), English politician

== See also ==
- John Strangways, a fictional character in the James Bond series
- John Fox-Strangways (1803–1859), British diplomat, Whig politician and courtier
