= William Coventry, 5th Earl of Coventry =

British Whig politician

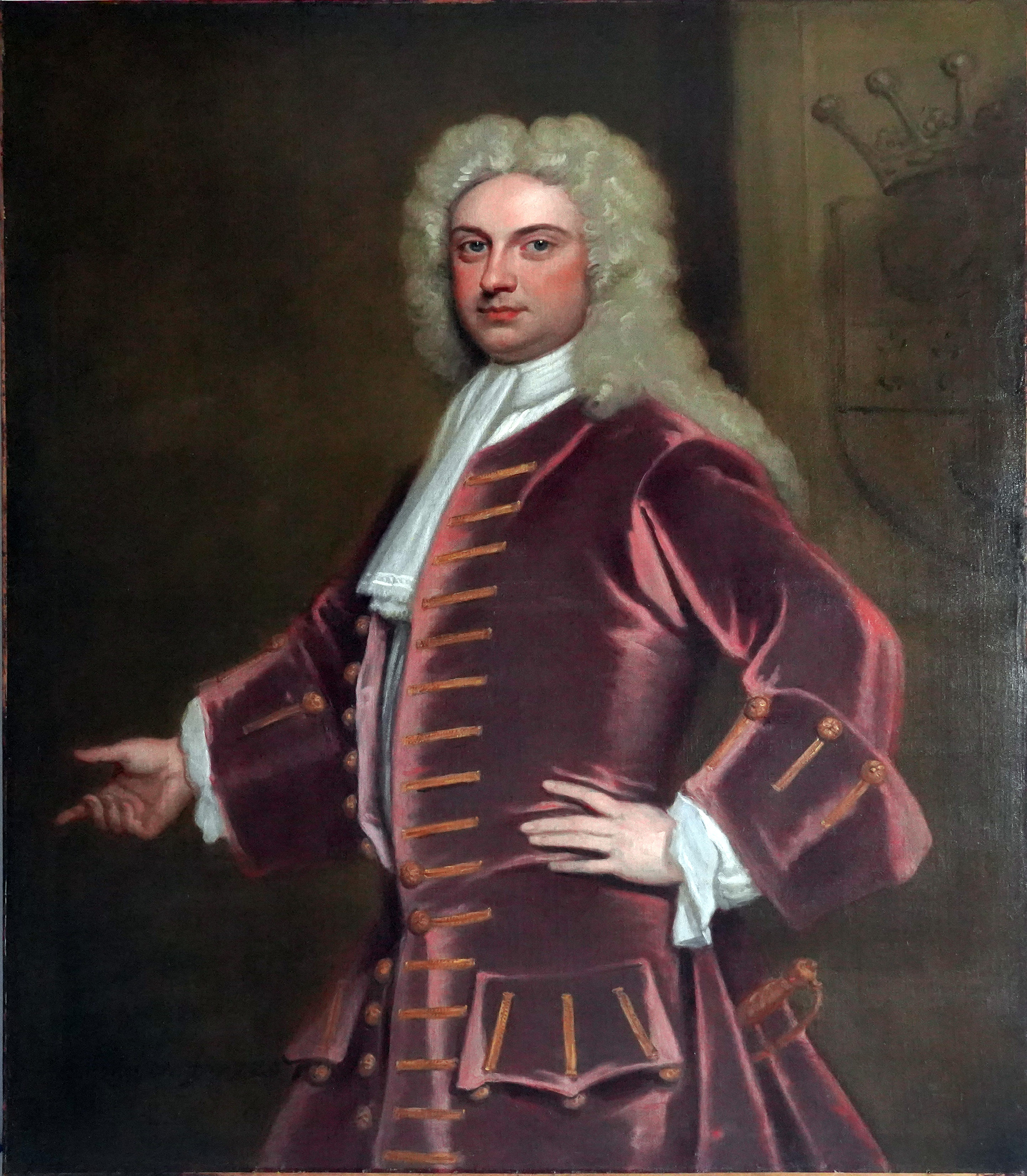
Portrait of William Coventry, 5th Earl of Coventry by Sir Godfrey Kneller. Painted in 1720

William Coventry, 5th Earl of Coventry PC (c. 1676 – 18 March 1751), of London and later Croome Court, Worcestershire, was a British Whig politician who sat in the House of Commons from 1708 to 1719.

== Early life ==
Coventry was the son of Walter Coventry and his wife Anne (née Holcombe), daughter of Humphrey Holcombe, merchant, of St. Andrew's Holborn. He succeeded his father in 1692. He was admitted at Pembroke College, Cambridge on 13 April 1693, aged 16. His grandfather Walter Coventry was the youngest brother of Thomas Coventry, 1st Baron Coventry.

== Career ==
Coventry was returned unopposed as Whig Member of Parliament for Bridport at the 1708 British general election. He voted for naturalizing the Palatines in 1709 and for the impeachment of Dr Sacheverell in 1710. At the 1710 British general election he was again returned unopposed. He voted for the amendment to the South Sea bill on 25 May 1711 and for the motion for ‘No Peace Without Spain’ on 7 December. He also voted against the French commerce bill on 18 June 13. At the 1713 British general election he was returned again unopposed for Bridport. He voted against the expulsion of Richard Steele on 18 March 1713.

Coventry was returned again as MP for Bridport at the 1715 British general election. He voted for the Administration in all recorded divisions. Early in the parliament, he applied for the office of clerk of the Parliaments, but Sir Robert Walpole kept upping the price to him until he angrily refused. He was appointed Keeper, the bailiwick of Frisham, New Forest by 1717 and was appointed Joint Clerk Comptroller of the Board of Green Cloth in 1717. His only known speech was in December 1717, when he supported a motion to maintain. In 1719, he accompanied the King to Hanover.

On 27 October 1719, he unexpectedly succeeded Gilbert Coventry, his second cousin once removed, as fifth Earl of Coventry, the fourth Earl having died at the age of 51 without a male heir, despite there being many nephews and closer male relations of the 4th Earl, including a presumed daughter from his marriage who was not legitimised until after both her parents deaths, the special remainder or the seat of Earl Coventry, meant that Coventry would inherit as 5th Earl. Accordingly, Coventry vacated his seat in the House of Commons and entered the House of Lords where he became a 'malcontent', and signed many protests. He was appointed to the Privy Council on 22 March 1720 and was appointed Lord Lieutenant of Worcestershire in the same year. In 1724 he was successfully sued by Anne Coventry, the widow of the fourth earl, for her inheritance.

== Later life and legacy ==
Lord Coventry married Elizabeth Allen, daughter of John Allen of Westminster, in 1720. He became High Steward of Bridport in 1727.

Lady Coventry died in 1738. He survived her by thirteen years and died in March 1751. He had three sons and as his eldest son Thomas Henry Coventry, Viscount Deerhurst, predeceased him he was succeeded by his second son George, who extensively redeveloped Croome Court. His third son was John Bulkeley Coventry, who succeeded George as MP for Worcestershire.

His daughter married George Richards who was Member of Parliament for Bridport from 1741 to 1746.

Parliament of Great Britain
Preceded by Alexander Pitfield; Thomas Strangways	Member of Parliament for Bridport; 1708–1719; With: Thomas Strangways 1708–1713; John Hoskins Gifford 1713–1715; John Strangways 1715; Peter Walter 1715–1719	Succeeded by Peter Walter; Sir Dewey Bulkeley
Honorary titles
Vacant Title last held by The Duke of Shrewsbury	Lord Lieutenant of Worcestershire; 1719–1751	Succeeded by The Earl of Coventry
Preceded by The Lord Parker	Custos Rotulorum of Worcestershire; 1719–1751	Succeeded by The Earl of Coventry
Peerage of England
Preceded by Gilbert Coventry	Earl of Coventry; 1719–1751	Succeeded by George William Coventry
