= Solomon Ashley =

Member of Parliament for Bridport
- In office 1734–1741 Serving with William Bowles
- Preceded by: John Jewkes
- Succeeded by: George Richards

Personal details
- Born: 1690
- Died: February 1775 (aged 84–85)

Solomon Ashley (1690 – February 1775) was an English politician who was Member of Parliament for Bridport. He was also a plantation owner in the West Indies.

== See also ==
- List of MPs elected in the 1734 British general election
