= Nathaniel Newnham =

Nathaniel Newnham may refer to:

- Nathaniel Newnham (senior) (c.1699–1778), British politician
- Nathaniel Newnham (junior) (c.1741/1742–1809), British politician
