= Thomas Grenville (Royal Navy officer) =

British sailor and politician

Captain Thomas Grenville
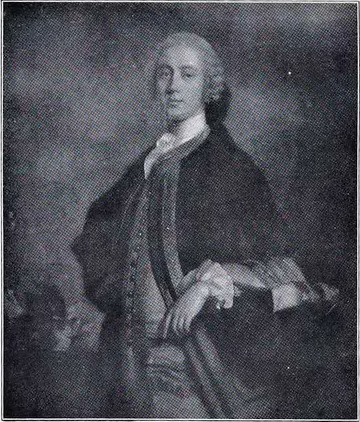
- portrait by Allan Ramsay
- Born: 14 April 1719
- Died: 3 May 1747 (aged 28); Aboard HMS Defiance, off Cape Finisterre
- Burial place: Wotton Underwood, Buckinghamshire
- Relatives: Richard Grenville (father); Hester Grenville, 1st Countess Temple (mother); George Grenville (brother); Richard Grenville-Temple, 2nd Earl Temple (brother)
- Military career
- Allegiance: Great Britain / British Empire
- Branch: Royal Navy
- Service years: – 1747
- Rank: Post Captain
- Commands: HMS Romney; HMS Falkland; HMS Defiance
- Conflicts: War of the Austrian Succession; Battle of Cape Finisterre

Thomas Grenville (4 April 1719 – 3 May 1747^{[a]}) was an officer of the Royal Navy and Member of Parliament for Bridport. He saw service during the War of the Austrian Succession.

Born into a politically well-connected family, Thomas Grenville rose quickly through the naval ranks to his first commands during the War of the Austrian Succession. A fortunate encounter while in his first command brought him a valuable prize, while political influence ensured he received prime postings. He was to have gone on an independent cruise early in 1747, but the requirements of the service meant that he was instead attached to the fleet in the Atlantic under George Anson. Anson came across a French fleet under the Marquis de la Jonquière, off Cape Finisterre and attacked them in the Battle of Cape Finisterre. He won a decisive victory, but Grenville was among the casualties, having been wounded in the leg, and subsequently dying of his injuries after a few hours. His body was returned to England for burial, and a memorial was raised to his memory by his relative, at Stowe House.

== Family and early career ==
Thomas Grenville was born on 4 April 1719, the seventh son of the politician Richard Grenville. His older brothers, George and Richard, also became distinguished politicians. George served as Prime Minister between 1763 and 1765. Thomas was brother-in-law to William Pitt, 1st Earl of Chatham. He was politically close to both men as all were Cobham Cubs of the Patriot Whig persuasion, a grouping led by his uncle Lord Cobham.

Thomas Grenville entered the Royal Navy, and had risen to the rank of lieutenant by 1740, and captain by 1742. He was given command of the 50-gun HMS Romney on 6 April 1742, and while sailing off Cape St. Vincent in March 1743, he captured a Spanish ship sailing from Veracruz to Cádiz with an extremely valuable cargo, valued at £120,000 or £130,000,. In a letter to his brother George, Grenville estimated his share as being probably between £30,000 and £40,000, but it does not seem to have actually amounted to more than half. He was then appointed to the 50-gun HMS Falkland and served off the coast of Ireland.

== Later career and death ==
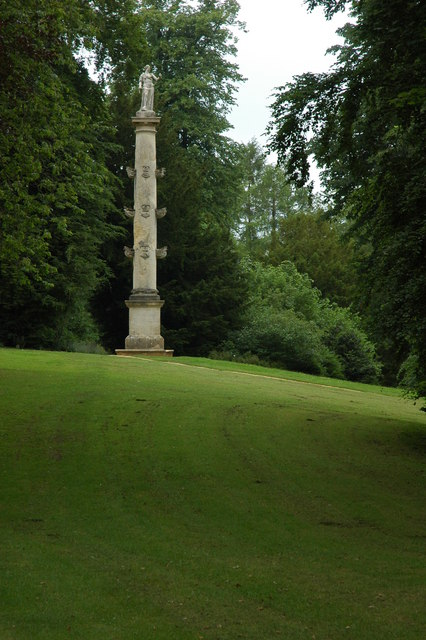
Column erected to Grenville's memory at Stowe House, by his uncle, Lord Cobham

Grenville was moved to the 60-gun HMS Defiance in 1746, and was elected as MP for the naval town of Bridport on 12 December 1746. He was ordered on an independent cruise in early 1747, due to the influence of his brother George, who was at this time one of the lords of the admiralty, but at the last moment his orders were changed and Grenville was ordered to join the fleet under George Anson. The change in orders caused annoyance, though Anson wrote to George Grenville to promise that he would detach Thomas as soon as he was able.

On 3 May, Anson came across a French squadron, under the command of the Marquis de la Jonquière, off Cape Finisterre and attacked them. In the Battle of Cape Finisterre, Anson won a decisive victory, but Grenville was among the casualties. He had been hit by a large splinter two hours into the engagement, which smashed his left thigh. The leg was at once amputated, but Grenville succumbed to his wounds five hours later. His body was returned to England, where George Lyttelton wrote that the joy of the victory "is palled to our family by the loss of poor Captain Grenville, one of the most promising young men in the navy, and who, had he lived, would have been an honour not to his family only, but to his country." Thomas Grenville was buried at the family seat in Wotton Underwood. His uncle, Lord Cobham, raised a column to his memory in the grounds of his house at Stowe.

== Notes ==
a. The dates in the article are in the Old Style, from the Julian calendar which was then in use in Britain.

== Citations ==
Parliament of Great Britain
Preceded by Viscount Deerhurst; George Richards	Member of Parliament for Bridport; 1746–1747; With: Viscount Deerhurst	Succeeded by Viscount Deerhurst; James Grenville
