= Thomas Strangways =

Thomas Strangways may refer to:

- Thomas Strangways (1643–1713), Member of Parliament for Poole and for Dorset
- Thomas Strangways (died 1726), Member of Parliament for Bridport and for Dorset
- Thomas Bewes Strangways (1809–1859), explorer
