= Peter Walter (politician) =

British scrivener and politician

Peter Walter (c. 1663–1746) of Stalbridge House was a British scrivener and politician who sat in the House of Commons from 1715 to 1734.

== Biography ==
Walter was born about 1663, but his parentage is unknown. By 1694 he was the clerk of Richard Newman of Fifehead Magdalen, Dorset, whose niece Diana he married. By 1707 he had become steward for life to John Holles, 1st Duke of Newcastle. Other nobles for whom he acted as agent included the 2nd and 3rd Earls of Essex and the 1st Earl of Uxbridge.

At the 1715 general election Walter stood for Parliament at Bridport. He was initially defeated in the poll, but was returned as Member of Parliament on petition on 10 May 1715. He supported the Administration in all known divisions. He was elected again for Bridport at the 1722 general election. In 1724 he was appointed Clerk of the peace for Middlesex, a post he held for the rest of his life. He did not stand at Bridport at the 1727 general election, but was then brought in as MP for Winchelsea at a by-election on 23 April 1728. He did not stand in 1734.

Walter made a large fortune by taking up mortgages and then foreclosing on the estates. He purchased Stalbridge and other properties, chiefly in Dorset and Somerset. He became notorious for his methods and was satirized by several literary figures. Henry Fielding referred to him as ‘Peter Pounce’, while Jonathan Swift wrote of him as ‘That rogue of genuine ministerial kind, Can half the peerage by his arts bewitch, Starve twenty lords to make one scoundrel rich’. Alexander Pope also wrote several lines pertaining to him

Walter died on 19 January 1746, and was said to be worth £300,000. His only child, a son Paget, pre-deceased him, and he was succeeded by his grandson, Peter.

Parliament of Great Britain
Preceded by John Strangways; William Coventry	Member of Parliament for Bridport; 1715–1727; With: William Coventry; Sir Dewey Bulkeley	Succeeded by William Bowles; James Pelham
Preceded by Robert Bristow; Sir Archer Croft	Member of Parliament for Winchelsea; 1728–1734; With: Robert Bristow	Succeeded by Edmund Hungate Beaghan; Robert Bristow
