= Lord Lieutenant of Worcestershire =

Civil post in Worcestershire, England

This is a list of people who have served as Lord Lieutenant of Worcestershire. Since 1719, all Lord Lieutenants have also been Custos Rotulorum of Worcestershire.

== Lord Lieutenants of Worcestershire to 1974 ==
- see Lord Lieutenant of Wales for pre-Restoration lieutenants
- Interregnum
- Thomas Hickman-Windsor, 7th Baron Windsor 18 July 1660 – 17 July 1662
- Thomas Wriothesley, 4th Earl of Southampton 17 July 1662 – 9 March 1663
- Thomas Hickman-Windsor, 1st Earl of Plymouth 9 March 1663 – 3 November 1687
- Francis Smith, 2nd Viscount Carrington 19 November 1687 – 16 April 1689
- Charles Talbot, 1st Duke of Shrewsbury 16 April 1689 – 1 February 1718
- vacant
- William Coventry, 5th Earl of Coventry 16 December 1719 – 18 March 1751
- George Coventry, 6th Earl of Coventry 7 May 1751 – 23 November 1808
- George Coventry, 7th Earl of Coventry 23 November 1808 – 26 March 1831
- Thomas Foley, 3rd Baron Foley 23 April 1831 – 16 April 1833
- William Lyttelton, 3rd Baron Lyttelton 10 May 1833 – 30 April 1837
- Thomas Foley, 4th Baron Foley 19 May 1837 – 7 November 1839
- George Lyttelton, 4th Baron Lyttelton 7 November 1839 – 19 April 1876
- Frederick Lygon, 6th Earl Beauchamp 17 May 1876 – 19 February 1891
- George Coventry, 9th Earl of Coventry 19 March 1891 – 18 July 1923
- John Lyttelton, 9th Viscount Cobham 18 July 1923 – 31 July 1949
- Adm. Sir William Tennant 11 April 1950 – 26 July 1963
- Charles Lyttelton, 10th Viscount Cobham 11 December 1963 – 31 March 1974

On 31 March 1974 Worcestershire merged with Herefordshire to form the new administrative county of Hereford and Worcester, which also became a new lieutenancy area (see Lord Lieutenant of Hereford and Worcester). After the abolition of Hereford and Worcester in 1998 after only 24 years, the two counties again became two separate administrative counties as well as two separate lieutenancy areas.

== Lord Lieutenants of Worcestershire from 1998 ==
- Sir Thomas Dunne 1 April 1998 – 27 September 2001
- Michael Brinton 27 September 2001 – 23 April 2012
- Lt Col Patrick Holcroft 28 December 2012 – 17 March 2023
- Beatrice Grant 17 March 2023 – present

== Deputy lieutenants ==
A deputy lieutenant of Worcestershire is commissioned by the Lord Lieutenant of Worcestershire. Deputy lieutenants support the work of the lord-lieutenant. There can be several deputy lieutenants at any time, depending on the population of the county. Their appointment does not terminate with the changing of the lord-lieutenant, but they usually retire at age 75.

=== 19th Century ===
- 22 October 1824: Richard Frances
- 29 February 1848: Osman Ricardo
