= Thomas Henry Coventry, Viscount Deerhurst =

British Tory Member of Parliament

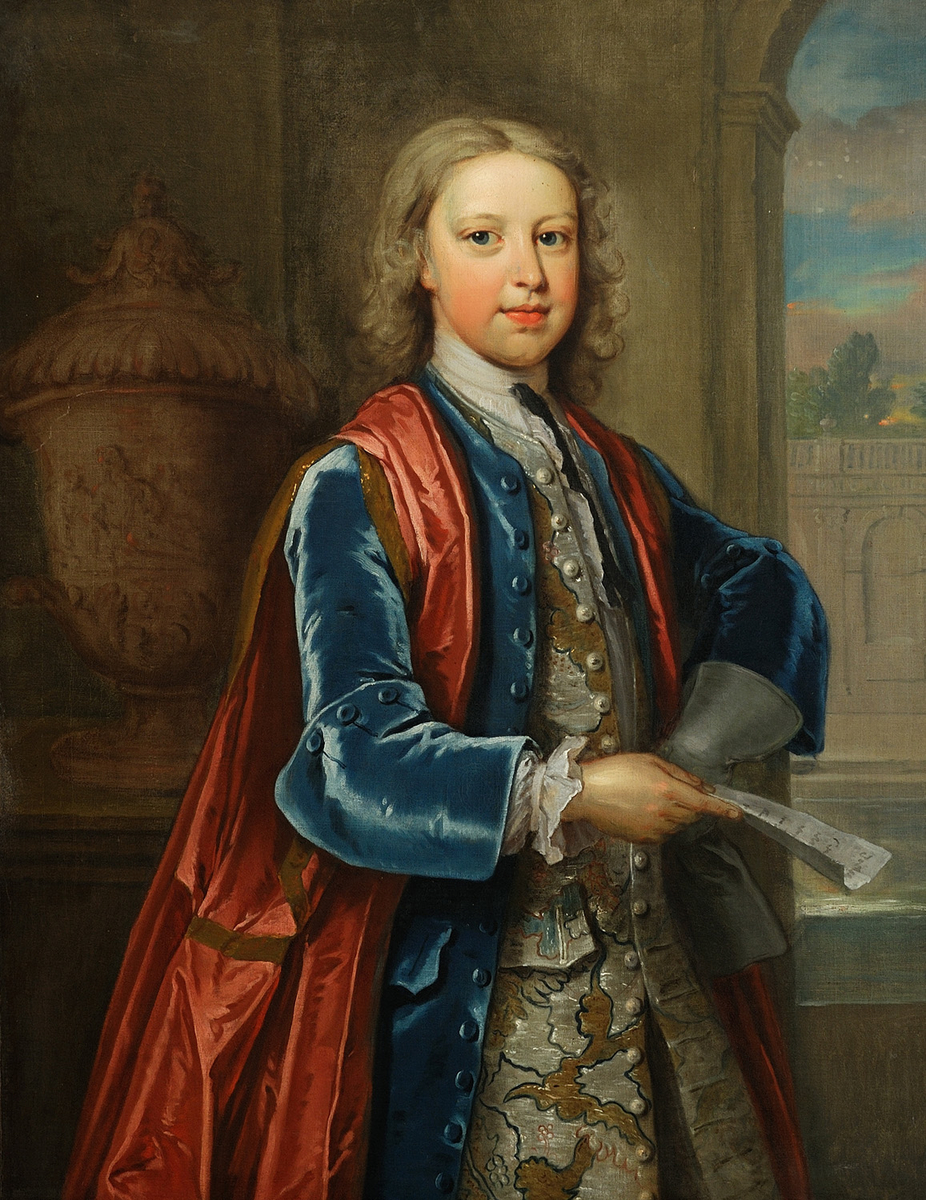
Thomas Henry Coventry

Thomas Henry Coventry, Viscount Deerhurst (27 March 1721 – 20 May 1744), was a British Tory member of parliament.

Deerhurst was the eldest son of William Coventry, 5th Earl of Coventry, and his wife Elizabeth (née Allen), and was educated at Winchester and University College, Oxford. In 1742 he was elected to the House of Commons as one of two representatives for Bridport, a seat he held until his early death in May 1744, aged 23. He never married. His younger brother George succeeded him as Member of Parliament for Bridport and inherited the earldom in 1751.

== See also ==
- Earl of Coventry

Parliament of Great Britain
| Preceded by William Bowles; George Richards | Member of Parliament for Bridport; 1742–1744; With: George Richards | Succeeded by George Richards; Viscount Deerhurst |
