= James Grenville =

British politician

James Grenville (12 February 1715 – 14 September 1783) was a British politician.

He was born at Wotton House, Buckinghamshire in 1715 into the influential Grenville political family and was one of five brothers who went into politics. He was the third son of Richard Grenville, a prominent Buckinghamshire politician and his brothers included Richard Grenville-Temple, 2nd Earl Temple, George Grenville, later the Prime Minister, and Thomas Grenville. He was educated at Eton College (1728–32) and studied law at the Inner Temple, where he was called to the bar in 1738.

In 1738 he inherited Butleigh Court, Somerset from his aunt Catherine Riggs née Symcox.

He was first elected as a Member of Parliament in 1741 on the slate of Lord Cobham and served as one of Cobham's Cubs during his early years in parliament. In 1746 he was given a position at the Board of Trade. From 1756 to 1761, under Pitt, he was a junior Lord of the Treasury. Other positions included Lord of the Treasury (Nov. 1756-Apr. 1757 and July 1757-Mar. 1761), Cofferer of the Household (Mar.-Oct. 1761), Privy Counsellor, 1761 and Joint Vice-Treasurer of Ireland (Aug. 1766-Jan. 1770).

In October 1761 following his brother-in-law William Pitt's resignation, James Grenville resigned along with him and went into opposition. He later oversaw the reconciliation between George Grenville, who had caused a rift with his family by not resigning, and their eldest brother Richard Grenville-Temple, 2nd Earl Temple a close ally of Pitt.

He married Mary, the daughter and heiress of James Smyth of South Elkington, Lincolnshire and with her had twin sons. He was succeeded in 1783 by his son James, who received most of his estate and was later created Baron Glastonbury, although some property also passed to the younger twin General Richard Grenville. Both sons served together as the MPs for Buckingham from 1774 to 1780.

He is buried Church of St Leonard, Butleigh.

== Bibliography ==
- Lawson, Philip. George Grenville: A Political Life. University of Manchester Press, 1984.

Parliament of Great Britain
Preceded by William Pitt; George Lyttelton	Member of Parliament for Old Sarum; 1742–1747; With: William Pitt	Succeeded by William Pitt; Edward Willes
Preceded by Viscount Deerhurst; Thomas Grenville	Member of Parliament for Bridport; 1747–1754; With: Viscount Deerhurst 1747; John Frederick Pinney 1747–54	Succeeded by John Frederick Pinney; Thomas Coventry
Preceded by George Grenville; Temple West	Member of Parliament for Buckingham; 1754–1768; With: George Grenville	Succeeded by George Grenville; Henry Grenville
Preceded by Sir Lionel Pilkington; Robert Pratt	Member of Parliament for Horsham; 1768–1770; With: Robert Pratt	Succeeded by Robert Pratt; James Wallace
Court offices
Preceded by The Duke of Leeds	Cofferer of the Household; 1761	Succeeded by The Earl of Thomond
