= Thomas Coventry (cricketer) =

English cricketer

Hon. Thomas William Coventry (24 December 1778 – April 1816) was an English amateur cricketer.

He was the youngest son of George Coventry, 6th Earl of Coventry and his second wife, Barbara St John. His elder brother was named John (20 June 1765 – 12 November 1829).

In 1797, he inherited the estate, including North Cray Place in Kent, of his godfather, Thomas Coventry. He sold the contents of the house in 1804.

He made two known appearances in important matches from 1800 to 1801 and was a member of Marylebone Cricket Club (MCC).

He married Catherine Clarke and had a son and 2 daughters. On his death in 1816, he left the North Cray estate to his son, Thomas William Coventry, who was only 16 years old.

== External sources ==
- CricketArchive record
