= Peter Walter (1715–1753) =

British politician (1715–1753)

Member of the Parliament of Great Britain for Shaftesbury
- In office 1741–1747 Serving with Charles Ewer (1741–1742); George Pitt (1742–1747)

Personal details
- Born: 1715
- Died: October 1753 (aged 37–38)
- Relations: Peter Walter (grandfather)

Peter Walter (1715 – October 1753), of Stalbridge, Dorset, was a British politician who sat in the Parliament of Great Britain as a Member of Parliament (MP) for Shaftesbury from 1741 to 1747.

Walter was the eldest son of Paget Walter of Stalbridge and the grandson of Peter Walter, the money scrivener who sat for Bridport and Winchelsea. He succeeded his grandfather to Stalbridge and to most of his estates early in 1746.

Returned unopposed as a Whig on a compromise in 1741, Walter sat for Shaftesbury alongside Charles Ewer until Ewer's death in 1742, and thereafter alongside George Pitt. He offered himself again at Shaftesbury in 1747 but withdrew before the poll, and died in October 1753.

== See also ==
- List of MPs elected in the 1741 British general election
