= Thomas Newnham =

English politician (1697–1761)

Thomas Newnham (1 May 1697 – 18 September 1761) was an English politician. He sat as MP for Queenborough from 1741 till 1754.

He was the first son of Nathaniel Newnham, a London merchant and the brother of Nathaniel Newnham. He married Penelope, the daughter of B. R. Shelley.
