= HMS Defiance (1744) =

Ship of the line of the Royal Navy

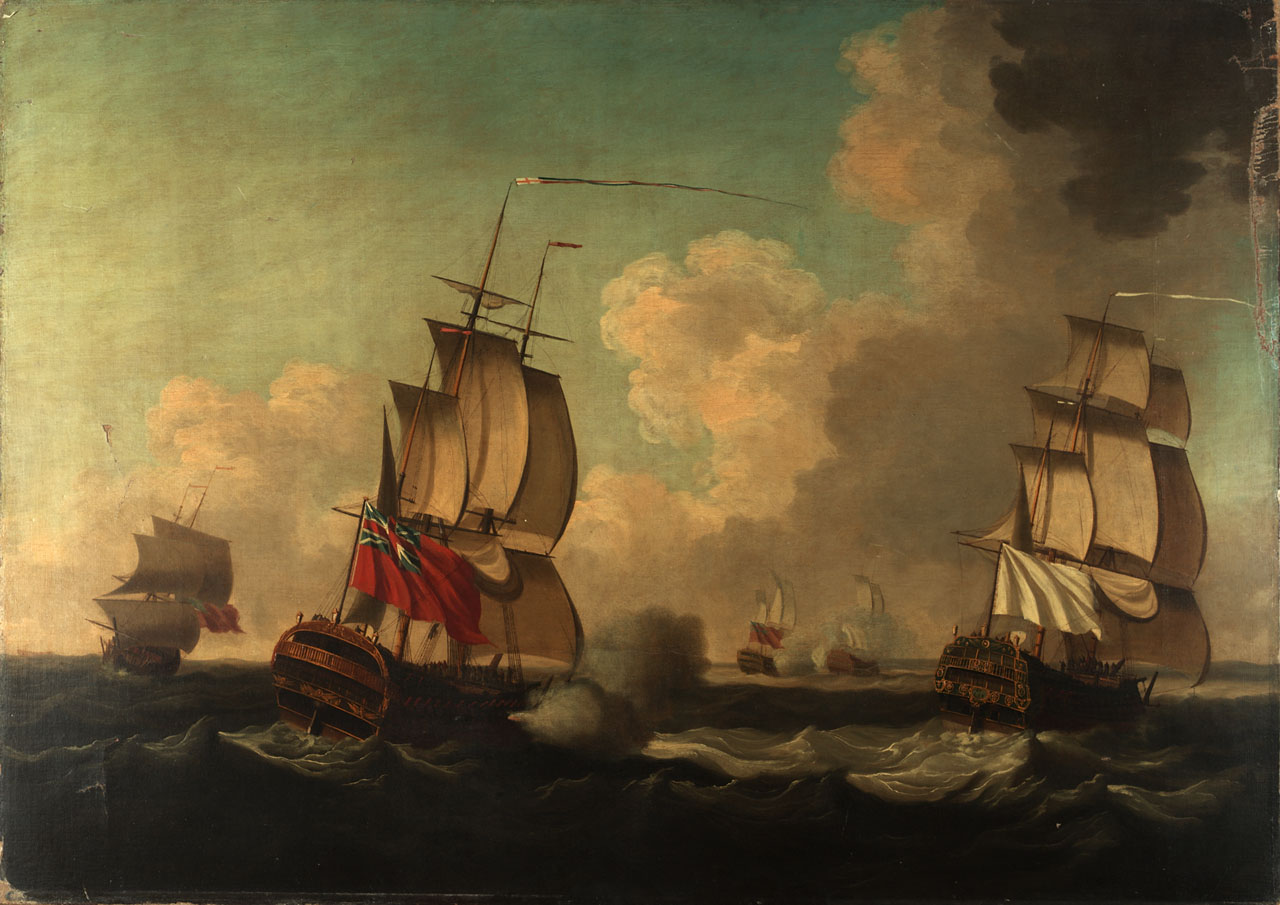
- Defiance (foreground, left of centre) at the action of 8 June 1755

History

Great Britain
- Name: HMS Defiance
- Builder: West, Deptford
- Launched: 12 October 1744
- Honours and awards: Second battle of Cape Finisterre, 1747
- Fate: Sold, 1766

General characteristics
- Class & type: 1741 proposals 58-gun fourth rate ship of the line
- Tons burthen: 1136
- Length: 147 ft (44.8 m) (gundeck)
- Beam: 42 ft (12.8 m)
- Depth of hold: 18 ft 1 in (5.5 m)
- Propulsion: Sails
- Sail plan: Full-rigged ship
- Armament: 58 guns: Gundeck: 24 × 24 pdrs; Upper gundeck: 24 × 12 pdrs; Quarterdeck: 8 × 6 pdrs; Forecastle: 2 × 6 pdrs

HMS Defiance was a 58-gun fourth rate ship of the line of the Royal Navy, built to the dimensions laid out in the 1741 proposals of the 1719 Establishment at Deptford, and launched on 12 October 1744.

In November 1745 she encountered her fellow Royal Navy vessel HMS Hampton Court. The crew of both vessels mistook the other for a French man-o-war and opened fire at long range. The engagement ended after half an hour, when the crew aboard Defiance observed British markings on the cannonballs striking their ship and signaled for a truce.

During the Seven Years' War, the Defiance was part of the 1758 Royal Navy fleet assembled to attack the French fortress at Louisbourg. Before the siege, she captured a French ship that was carrying much-needed provisions and military supplies from France to the fortress.

Defiance was sold out of the Navy in 1766.
