= Thomas Strangways (1683–1726) =

Member of Parliament for Dorset
- In office 1713 – 23 September 1726

Member of Parliament for Bridport
- In office 1705–1713

Personal details
- Born: 1683
- Died: 23 September 1726 (aged 42–43)
- Relations: John Strangways (brother)
- Parent: Thomas Strangways I
- Education: Hertford College, Oxford

Thomas Strangways (1683 – 23 September 1726) was an English politician who was Member of Parliament (MP) for Dorset and Bridport.

== Biography ==
Strangways was the eldest son of Thomas Strangways.

== See also ==
- List of MPs elected in the 1722 British general election
