= John Frederick Pinney =

Member of Parliament for Bridport
- In office 1747–1761 Serving with Thomas Coventry

Personal details
- Born: 27 January 1719
- Died: 11 November 1762 (aged 43)

John Frederick Pinney (27 January 1719 – 11 November 1762) was an English politician who was Member of Parliament for Bridport. He was also a plantation and slave owner on the island of Nevis in the West Indies. He had no children so when he died the son of his distant cousin John Pretor Pinney was the key beneficiary of his will, inheriting land in Dorset and several plantations worked by enslaved people on Nevis. His inheritance was on the condition that he took the surname Pinney, which he did.

== See also ==
- List of MPs elected in the 1754 British general election
