= Nathaniel Newnham (senior) =

English politician

Nathaniel Newnham (c. 1699 – 17 September 1778) was an English politician and merchant. He sat as MP for Aldborough from 9 December 1743 till 1754 and for Bramber from 1754 till 1761.

He also served as director of the East India Company from 1738 till 1740, 1743 till 1746, 1748 till 1752, 1753 till 1757, 1758 till 1759 and director of the South Sea Company in 1761.

He was the second surviving son of Nathaniel Newnham and Honoria, the first daughter and coheiress of Thomas Kett, a merchant. He was the younger brother of Thomas Newnham and he married Sarah Adams and had five sons (including Nathaniel Newnham and George Lewis Newnham) and one daughter. His sister, Anne married MP Sir Dudley Ryder.
