= John Strangways (died 1716) =

Member of Parliament for Bridport
- In office 1 February 1715 – 10 May 1715

Personal details
- Born: 1688
- Died: 5 May 1716 (aged 27–28)
- Relations: Thomas Strangways (brother)
- Parent: Thomas Strangways I
- Education: Hertford College, Oxford

John Strangways (1688 – 5 May 1716) was an English politician who was Member of Parliament (MP) for Bridport.

== Biography ==
Strangways was the younger son of Thomas Strangways.

== See also ==
- List of MPs elected in the 1715 British general election
