= Dewey Bulkeley =

Member of Parliament for Bridport
- In office 30 November 1719 – 1727 Serving with Peter Walter

Personal details
- Died: 7 November 1735

Sir Dewey Bulkeley (died 7 November 1735) was an English politician who was Member of Parliament for Bridport. He was High Sheriff of Hampshire from 1705 to 1706. He was married to Anne Coventry, later Lady Bulkeley (1674–1774).

== See also ==
- List of MPs elected in the 1715 British general election
- List of MPs elected in the 1722 British general election
