= 1741 British general election =

Election in Great Britain

- 30 April – 11 June 1741

All 558 seats in the House of Commons 280 seats needed for a majority
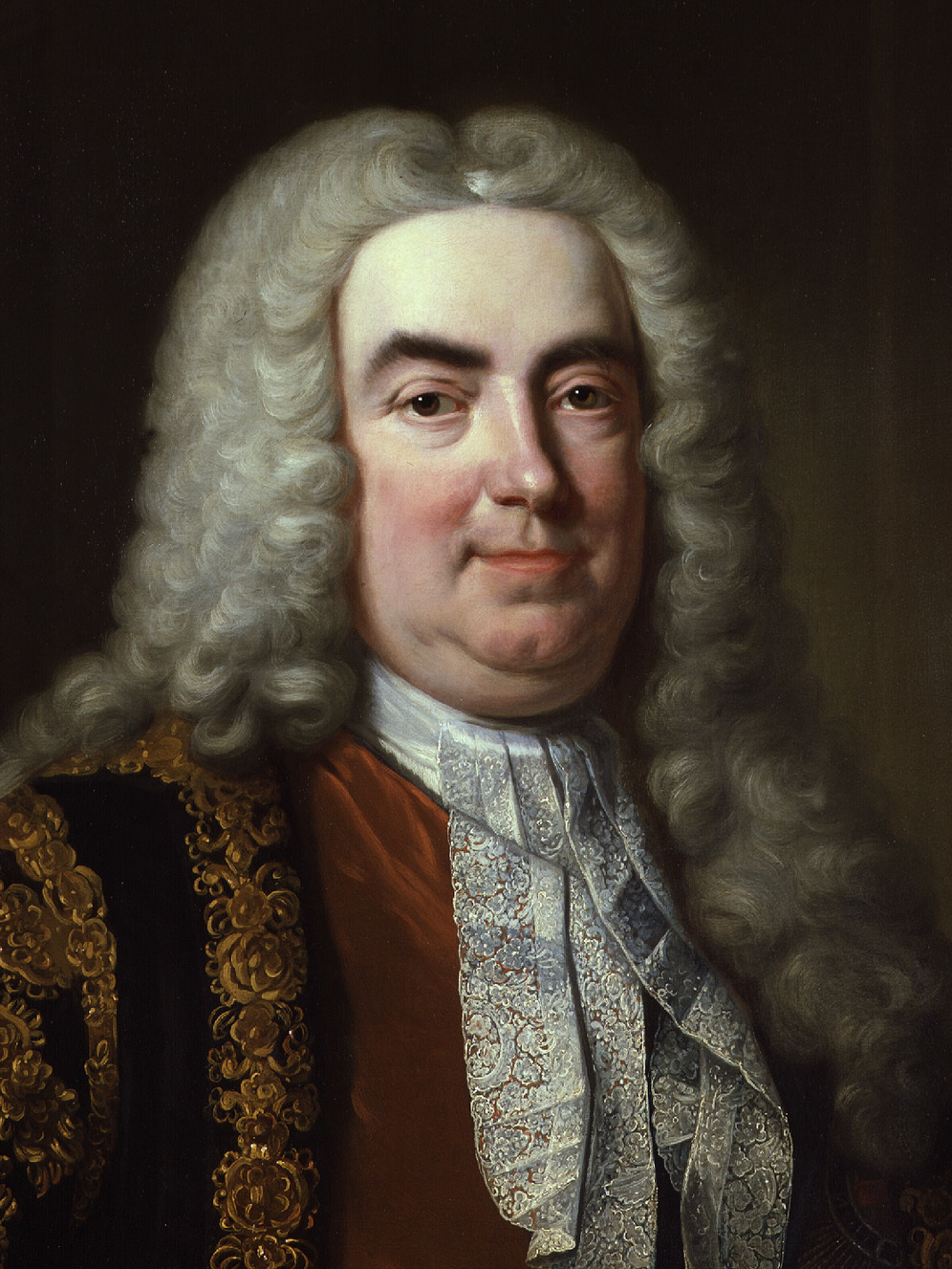

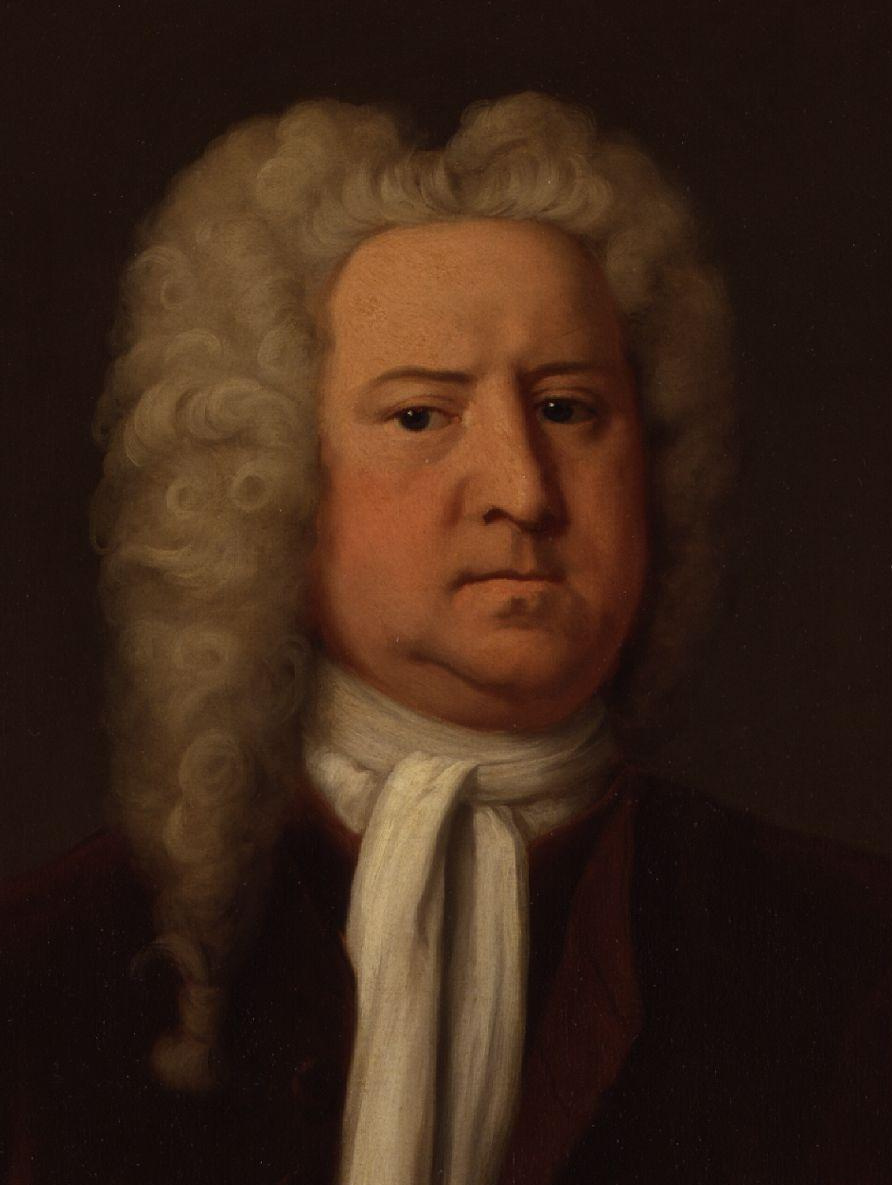

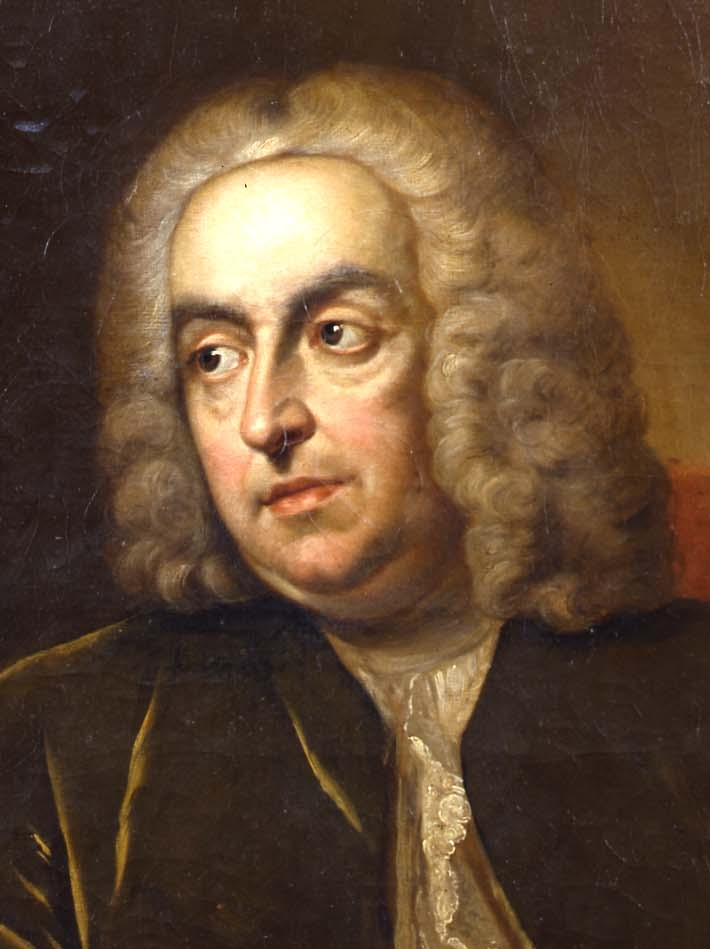
	First party	Second party	Third party
Leader	Sir Robert Walpole	Sir Watkin Williams-Wynn	William Pulteney
Party	Whig	Tory	Opposition / Patriot Whigs
Leader's seat	King's Lynn	Montgomeryshire	Middlesex
Seats won	286	136	131
Seat change	▼44	▼9	▲48
- Composition of the House of Commons after the election
Prime Minister before election
Sir Robert Walpole
Whig
Prime Minister after election
Sir Robert Walpole
Whig

The 1741 British general election returned members to serve in the House of Commons of the 9th Parliament of Great Britain to be summoned, after the merger of the Parliament of England and the Parliament of Scotland in 1707. The election saw support for the government party increase in the quasi-democratic constituencies which were decided by popular vote, but the Whigs lost control of a number of rotten and pocket boroughs, partly as a result of the influence of the Prince of Wales, and were consequently re-elected with the barest of majorities in the Commons, Robert Walpole's supporters only narrowly outnumbering his opponents.

== Fall of Walpole's government ==
Partly as a result of the election, and also due to the crisis created by naval defeats in the war with Spain, Walpole was finally forced out of office on 11 February 1742, after his government was defeated in a motion of no confidence concerning a supposedly rigged by-election. His supporters were then able to reconcile partially with the Patriot Whigs under William Pulteney in order to form a new government. The Tories remained excluded from any realistic hope of forming a government.

== Summary of the constituencies ==
See 1796 British general election for details. The constituencies used were the same throughout the existence of the Parliament of Great Britain.

== Dates of election ==
The general election was held between 30 April 1741 and 11 June 1741.

At this period elections did not take place at the same time in every constituency. The returning officer in each county or parliamentary borough fixed the precise date (see hustings for details of the conduct of the elections).

== Results ==

=== Seats summary ===
Parliamentary seats
Whig	51.3%
Tory	24.3%
Patriot	23.5%

== See also ==
- List of parliaments of Great Britain
- List of MPs elected in the 1741 British general election
