= George Richards (English politician) =

British Member of Parliament (died 1746)

Member of Parliament for Bridport
- In office 1741 – 25 November 1746

Personal details
- Born: Long Bredy, Dorset
- Relations: William Coventry, 5th Earl of Coventry (father-in-law)

George Richards (died 25 November 1746) was an English politician who was Member of Parliament for Bridport from 1741 to 1746 in the 9th Parliament of Great Britain.

== Early life ==
Richards was the son of a Spanish merchant.

== See also ==
- List of MPs elected in the 1741 British general election
