= Brightley Priory =

Priory in Devon, England

Coordinates: 50.7586°N 3.9883°W

Brightley Priory was founded in 1133 as a Cistercian monastery. It was built in 1136 and was situated about two miles north of Okehampton in Devon. It was abandoned by the monks after only five years on their removal to a nearby site which became Forde Abbey.

== History ==
Between 1133 and 1136, Richard FitzBaldwin (d. 1137) (Latinised to de Brioniis/Brionis/Bryonis), feudal baron of Okehampton, built a priory on his land at Brightley, on the bank of the West Okement River, near his caput of Okehampton Castle. He dedicated it to the Virgin Mary and invited Gilbert, Abbot of Waverley in Surrey, to send 12 monks and an abbot to form a new Cistercian community there.

It appears that the agricultural land surrounding the new priory was insufficiently fertile, forcing the monks to consider abandoning it and returning to the mother house in 1141. However, Adelicia de Brioniis, the sister of Richard (who died in 1137) and successor to his estate, offered them an alternative site instead on the River Axe in the manor of Thorncombe. Here, between 1141 and 1148, they built a new priory which came to be known as Forde Abbey due to its proximity to an ancient ford across the river.

The original site is now a farm but one of the farm outbuildings, a rectangular building running east–west, has considerable remains of an ecclesiastical form. It could possibly have been a chapel.

It is not to be confused with the important medieval manor of Brightley, Chittlehampton in north Devon, an error made by the Devon topographer Tristram Risdon in his 1630 work "A Survey of Devon" in his account of the parish of Chittlehampton.

== Bibliography ==
- Wright, W. H. K. Some Account of the Barony and Town of Okehampton, its antiquities and institutions (Tiverton: W. Masland, 1889).
- Heath, Sidney. The story of Ford Abbey: from the earliest times to the present day (London: F. Griffiths, 1911).
- Upham, M. "Brightley Abbey". in: Transactions of the Devonshire Association; 138 [2006], 151–64).
