= Thomas Benson (1708–1772) =

English merchant and politician (1708– c. 1771)

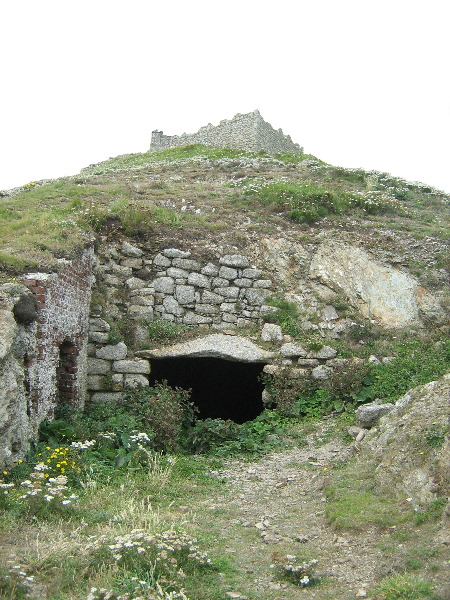
Benson's Cave, on Lundy: reputed to be where Benson stored contraband goods.

Thomas Benson (1708 – c. 1771), of Knapp House (alias Nap), Appledore, on the north Devon coast of England, was a ship-owner and merchant who was Sheriff of Devon in 1746–47 and MP for Barnstaple between 1747 and 1754. In 1753 he fled to Portugal from British justice, having been accused of customs duty evasion and maritime insurance fraud.

== Biography ==
He was the second son of John Benson (died 1739) of Knapp by his wife Grace Melhuish. The Bensons were long established merchants at Bideford, with an established trade to France, Portugal and Placentia in Newfoundland. They also owned lime-kilns in Bideford, near Appledore. In 1737 Benson married his cousin Frances Melhuish (died 1752), a daughter of Roger Melhuish by his second wife Eleanor Barber. By Frances he had two sons and two daughters.

On his father's death in 1739 Benson inherited some of his ships and some property in Appledore together with £1,000. This was augmented when he became heir to his elder brother Peter, who died in 1743. In his will Peter tried to dissuade his brother Thomas from continuing in the family trade, as he considered the future economic climate to be unfavourable.

In 1745 Benson presented a silver punch bowl, inscribed with his armorials, to Barnstaple mayor and corporation. (Note: Benson's armorials were: On a chevron between three goat's heads erased each charged on the neck with an escallop three escallops. Today, the punch bowl is displayed in the Dodderidge Room of Barnstaple Guildhall.) He was elected to Parliament as the member for Barnstaple in 1747, and the following year he acquired a lease of the island of Lundy, off the North Devon coast, for a rent of £60 per annum from John Leveson-Gower, 1st Earl Gower. Some time before 1753, Benson also purchased the estate of Halsbury in the parish of Parkham, near Bideford, from Roger Giffard (died 1763).

In 1747 he obtained a contract from the Government to transport English convicts, and gave the usual bond to the Sheriff to ship them to Virginia or to Maryland. However he shipped them instead to Lundy where he employed them as slave labourers in building walls, etc. His defence was that sending convicts to Lundy was the same as sending them to America, saying "they were transported from England, no matter where it was so long as they were out of the kingdom". His interpretation of the law was upheld.

=== Illegal activities ===
Despite the advice his brother left in his will, Benson continued to trade and expanded his operations into illegal activities including avoidance of paying customs duties on his imports, a large part of which were of tobacco from the American colonies, a trade in which Bideford was pre-eminent. He stored his smuggled goods in a cave on Lundy, which were discovered and the Sheriff of Devon was directed to levy the penalties on Benson. In 1752 he failed to pay some £8,000 of duty on imports valued at £40,000 and was prosecuted in the Court of Exchequer for non-payment. His estates, including Nap, were sequestered by the Crown.

In 1752 he obtained insurance at Exeter for his ship Nightingale which was fully laden with a valuable cargo of pewter, linen and salt, supposedly sailing for Maryland in America. However he gave orders to his captain and relative by marriage, John Lancey, to secretly unload the goods onto Lundy, and to scuttle the vessel. On 3 August 1752 the captain put the plan into action and scuttled the vessel in the Bristol Channel. The plot was discovered by the authorities following a confession by a crew member and Lancey was convicted, and hanged at Execution Dock in London on 7 June 1754. The episode is the subject of crime novel Hell and High Water by Tanya Landman.

Benson fled to Portugal in 1753, and his English assets and lands were seized by the Crown. Halsbury was later sold to the Davie family of nearby Orleigh. In Portugal he was joined by two of his remaining ships, and with his nephew Thomas Stafford he established one of the largest English trading companies in that country. He is said to have died in Porto in 1771 at the age of 64, but no direct evidence of this has been found.

== Sources ==
- Baring Gould, Sabine (1908). "The Pirates of Lundy". Devonshire Characters and Strange Events. London: John Lane. pp. 233–7.
- Taylor, M.C., biography of Thomas Benson, Barnstaple Heritage Booklet no. 5, Barnstaple, 2001
