= Halsbury =

Historic manor in north Devon, England

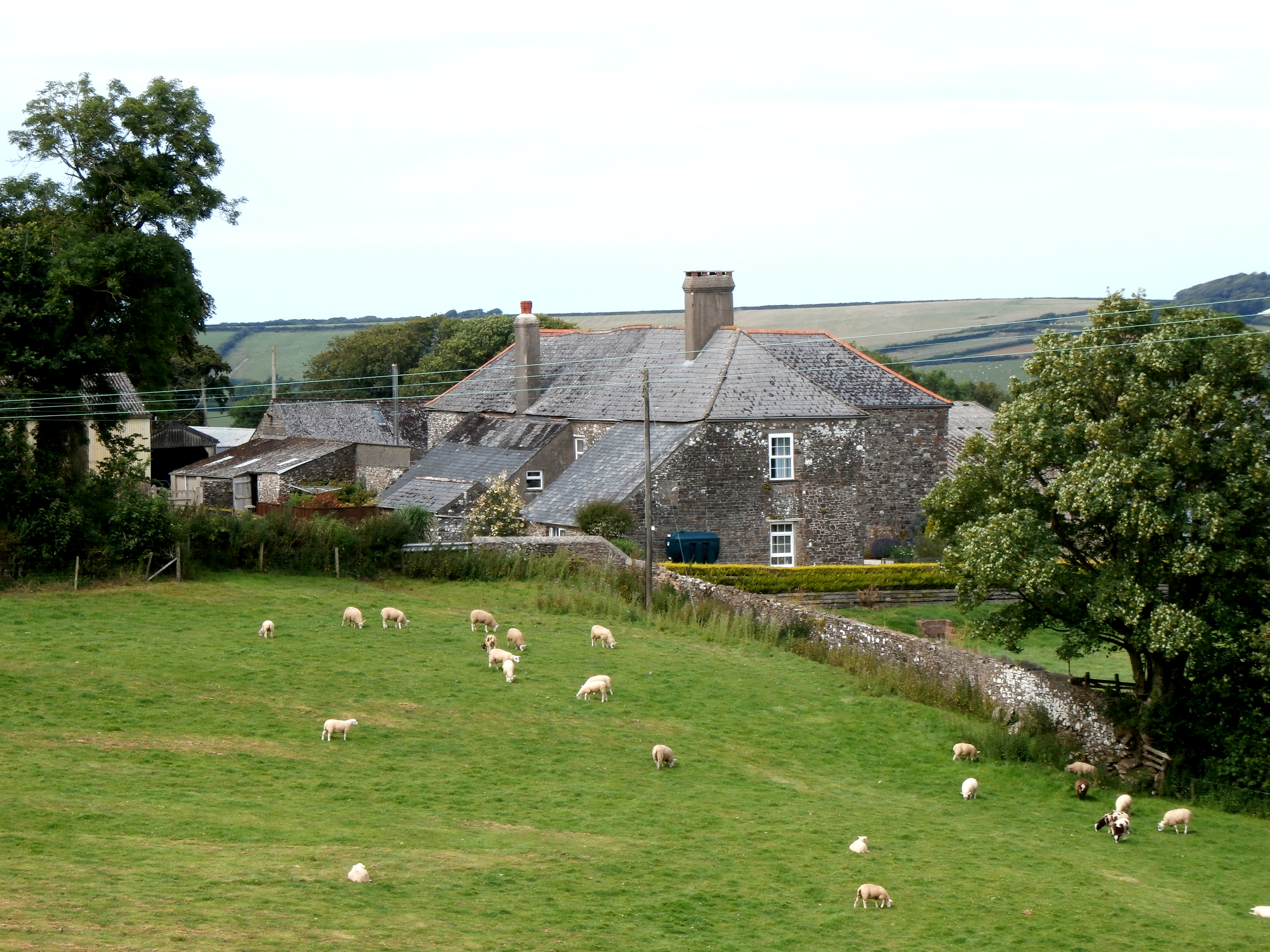
Halsbury Barton in the parish of Parkham, North Devon

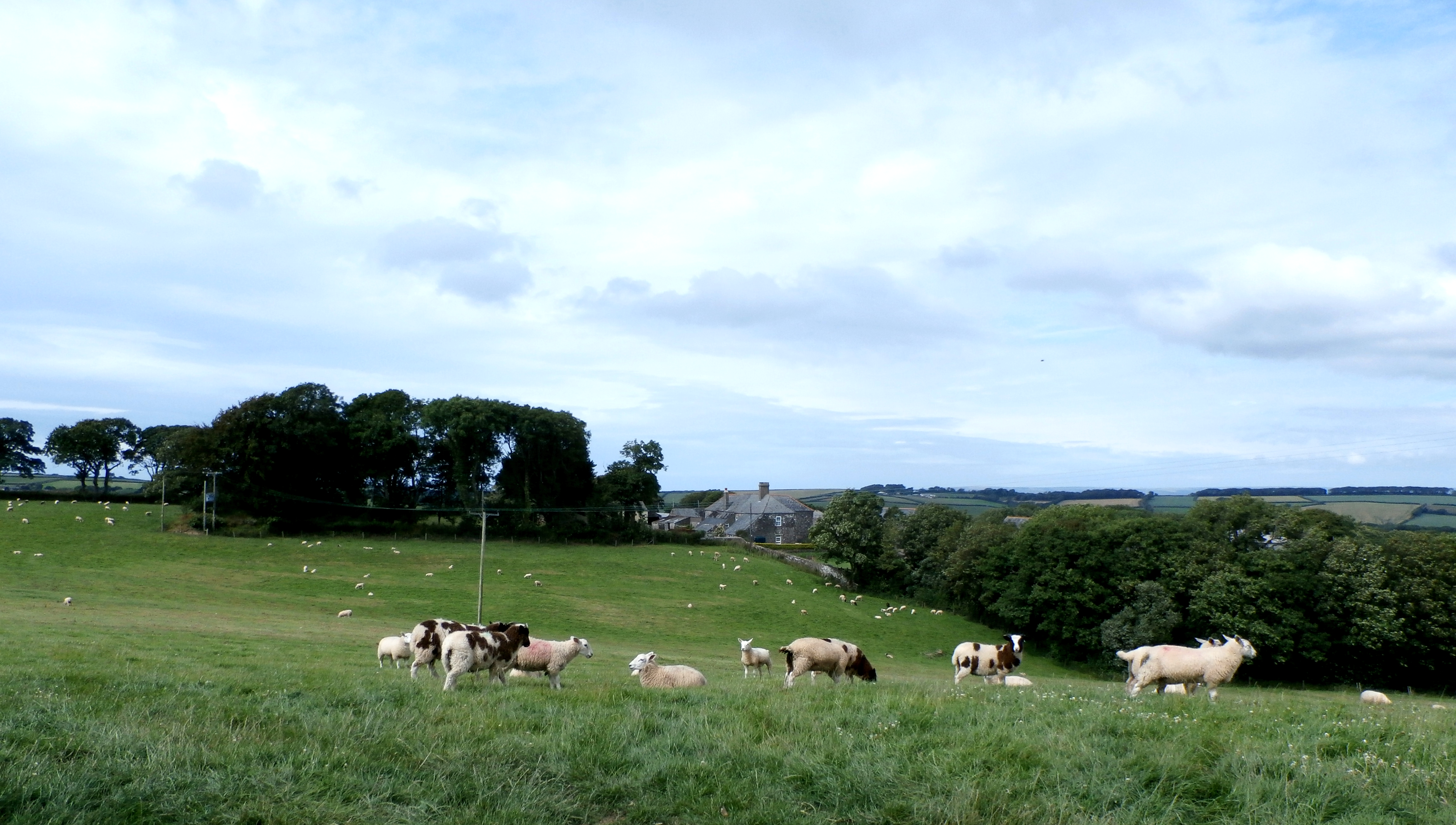
Setting of Halsbury

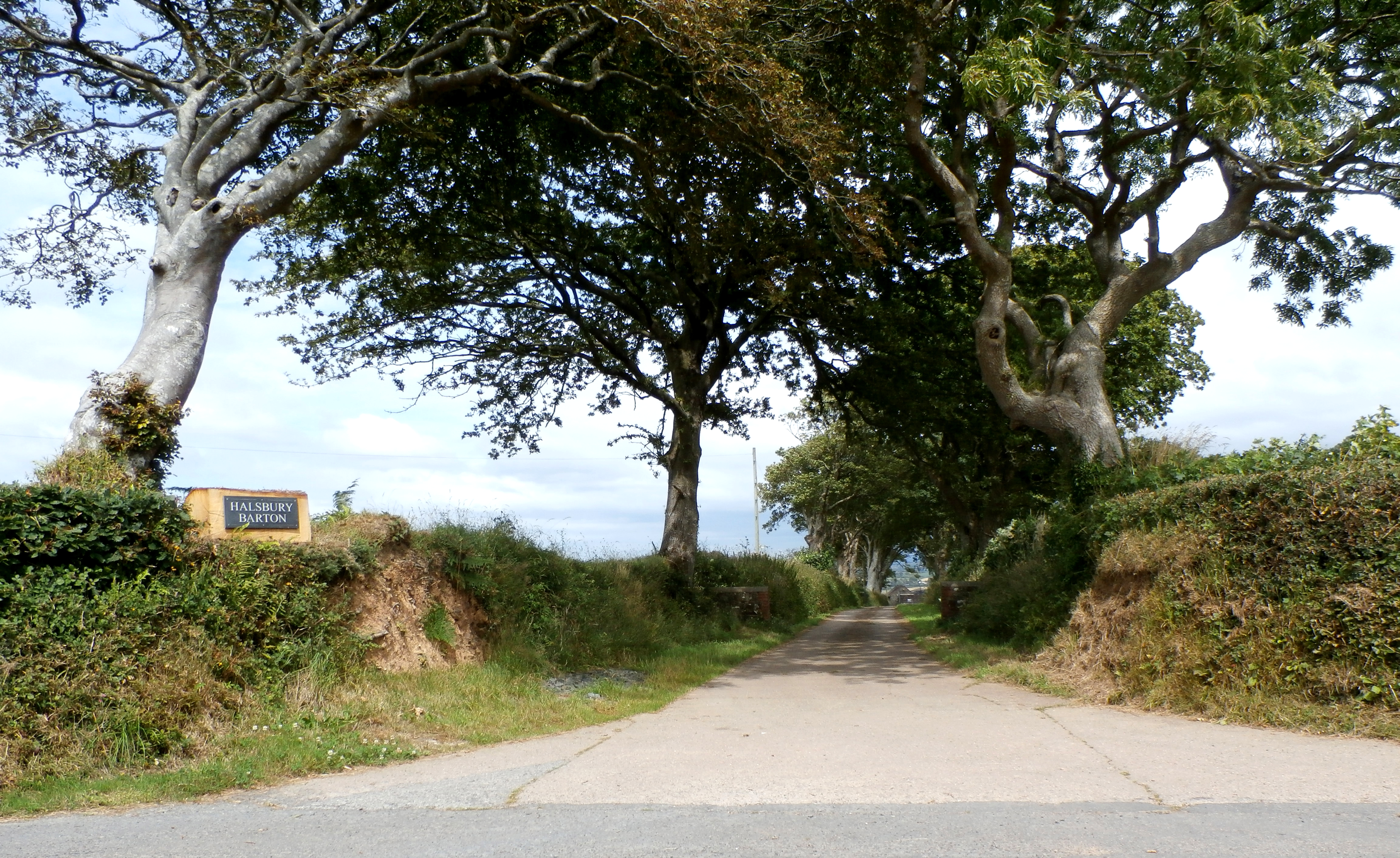
Road entrance to Halsbury

Halsbury (pron. "Haulsbury") is a historic manor in the parish of Parkham in North Devon, England. It is situated 2 miles north-east of the village of Parkham and 4 miles south-west of the town of Bideford. Halsbury was long a seat of the ancient Giffard family, a distant descendant of which was the celebrated lawyer Hardinge Stanley Giffard, 1st Earl of Halsbury (1823–1921), who adopted the name Halsbury for his earldom and was the author of the essential legal reference books Halsbury's Statutes. Halsbury Barton, now a farmhouse, retains 16th- and 17th-century elements of the former manor house of the Giffard family. It was described in a record of 1560 as a "new dwelling house".

== Descent ==
=== de Halsbury ===
The de Halsbury family were the earliest-recorded holders of the manor and took their surname from it. The descent of Halsbury in the family of Giffard was as follows:

- Walter de Halsbery, living during the reign of King Henry II (1154–1189)
- Baldwyn de Halsbury (son)
- Peter de Halsbury (son), who left his daughter Jone de Halsbury; living during the reign of King Edward I (1272–1307) as his sole heiress, who married Bartholomew Giffard.

=== Giffard ===
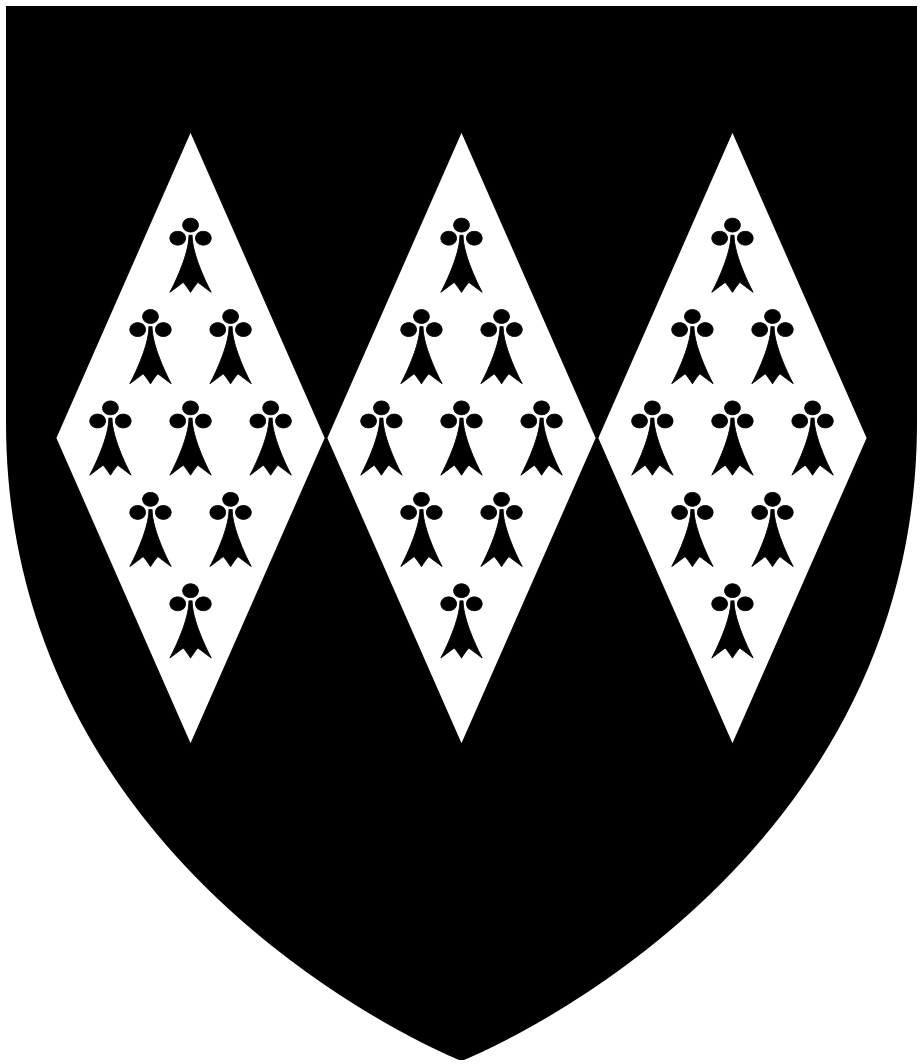
Arms of Giffard of Halsbury: Sable, three fusils conjoined in fesse ermine

The Giffard family of Halsbury was descended from the Anglo-Norman magnate Walter Giffard, 1st Earl of Buckingham (died 1102), Lord of Longueville in Normandy. His descendants, via a female branch which adopted the surname Guffard, held lands in Devon including the manors of Whitchurch, Wear Giffard, Clovelly Lamerton and Awlescombe.

The descent of Halsbury in the Giffard family as given by Pole (died 1635) and expanded by Vivian is as follows:

- Bartholomew Giffard, who by his marriage to the heiress Jone de Halsbury inherited the manor of Halsbury. In 1290 he witnessed a deed at nearby Portledge, the seat of the Coffin family, with Jellanus Dacus of nearby Orleigh.
- Baldwyn Giffard (son) who married a certain Jone. In 1318 with his grandfather Peter de Halsbury he witnessed a deed at Portledge.
- John Giffard (son), who married a certain Sibill
- Walter Giffard (son), who married a certain Isabell
- John Giffard (son), who married Jone Deuclive, daughter and heiress of Richard Deuclive. His second son was Andrew Giffard who married one of the co-heiresses of Sir Alan de Esse of Thuborough and founded the family of Giffard of Thuborough in the parish of Sutcombe in Devon.
- Thomas Giffard (eldest son and heir), who married a certain Wilmot Knight, daughter of a certain Knight
- John Giffard (son), who married Jone Dabernon, a daughter and co-heiress of John Dabernon by his wife Isabella Mules (or Moels), daughter of John Mules of Irishborough (alias Ernsborough in the parish of Swimbridge, Devon) descended from John de Moels, 1st Baron Moels (died 1310), feudal baron of North Cadbury in Somerset.
- Thomas Giffard (died 17 March 1533) (son), who married twice: firstly to his cousin Hawis (alias Avis) Dennys, a daughter of John Dennys of nearby Orleigh in the parish of Buckland Brewer, Devon, by his wife Eleanor Giffard, daughter and co-heiress of Stephen Giffard of Theuborough, Sutcombe; secondly to Anne Coryton, daughter of John Coryton of Newton in Quethioc, Cornwall. His eldest son from his 2nd marriage was Sir Roger Giffard who founded the junior albeit more prominent family of Giffard of Brightley in the parish of Chittlehampton in Devon.
- John Giffard (eldest son and heir by 1st marriage) of Halsbury, who married Ibot (alias Ebete) Woode, daughter of John (or Alexander) Woode of Asheridge in the parish of North Tawton, Devon.
- Thomas Giffard (died 1550) (son) of Halsbury, who married Margaret Monck, a daughter of Anthony Monck (died 1545) of Potheridge in Devon, great-great-grandfather of George Monck, 1st Duke of Albemarle (1608–1670).
- John Giffard (1547–1620) (son), who in 1574 married Alis Smyth (died 1633), a daughter of Richard (or Walter) Smyth of Totnes. It is not known what relation she was (if any) to Bernard Smith (by 1522–1591) of Totnes, MP for Totnes in 1558 and mayor of Totnes 1549–50 and c. 1565–6 and escheator of Devon and Cornwall 1567–8, who left a sole daughter and heiress Eleanor who married four times.
- John Giffard (1580–1625) (son), who in 1603 at Monkleigh married Elizabeth Tremayne (died 1657), a daughter and co-heiress of Edmund (or John) Tremayne of Collacombe in the parish of Lamerton, Devon.
- Thomas Giffard (1607–1648) (eldest son and heir), baptised at Monkleigh. He married Katherine Leach (died 1666), daughter of Sir Simon Leach (died 1638) of Cadleigh, Sheriff of Devon in 1624, (whose surviving effigy and monument in St Bartholomew's Church in Cadleigh is the largest of its type in any Devon parish church) and widow of Robert Burrington of West Sandford. Katherine was buried in Exeter Cathedral, where survives her monument. His son Arthur Giffard (1646–1648) died young, and thus did not inherit Halsbury. His daughter Katherine Giffard (1648–1663) was buried in Exeter Cathedral.
- John Giffard (born 1611, died post 1666) (younger brother), of Halsbury. He married Elizabeth Champernowne, daughter of Arthur Champernowne (born 1579) of Dartington. His only son Thomas Giffard (died 1659) predeceased his father and thus did not inherit Halsbury. Although he had a daughter Mary Giffard, John Giffard settled the estate of Halsbury onto his distant cousin Roger Giffard (1645–1733), the youngest son of Col. John Giffard (1602–1665) of Brightley, a distinguished Royalist commander in the Civil War.

=== Giffard of Brightley ===
- Roger Giffard (1645–1715) (cousin), the youngest son of Col. John Giffard (1602–1665) of Brightley, He married three times, but produced only a daughter Bridget, who died an infant in 1684. By his will he settled Halsbury in tail male, and thus it was inherited by his great-nephew Roger Giffard (1702–1763).
- Roger Giffard (1702–1763) (great-nephew), 2nd son of Henry Giffard (1675–1710), who had been disinherited by his father John Giffard (1639–1712) of Brightley in favour of his younger brother Caesar Giffard (1682–1715). Henry Giffard (died 1710) married Martha Hill (died 1752), daughter of Edward Hill, Treasurer of Virginia and an Admiralty Judge. Henry's grave slab survives in the floor of the Giffard Chapel in Chittlehampton Church. Roger Giffard (died 1763) married his cousin Elizabeth Giffard, daughter of John Giffard of Court, Chittlehampton, by whom he had "a numerous and heedless family" and sold Halsbury to "the celebrated adventurer" Thomas Benson. Roger's uncle Caesar Giffard, who was the last male Giffard of Brightley, drowned in 1715 while crossing the River Torridge, and his heirs sold Brightley. Thus the ancient Giffard family of Devon disappeared from the county of Devon. However, the male line continued in junior branches elsewhere, most notably as descended from John Giffard (died 1746) of Great Torrington, the elder son of Henry Giffard (died 1710) and Martha Hill. The most notable descendant of this branch was the Lord Chancellor Hardinge Giffard, 1st Earl of Halsbury (1823–1921), who was created Baron Halsbury in 1885 and Earl of Halsbury and Viscount Tiverton in 1898, the great-grandson of John Giffard (died 1746) of Great Torrington.

=== Benson ===
Thomas Benson (1708–1772), of Knapp House, (alias Nap) Appledore, Devon, MP for Barnstaple between 1747 and 1754, a ship-owner, merchant and maritime insurance fraudster, purchased Halsbury from Roger Giffard (died 1763). His silver punch bowl, inscribed with his armorials (On a chevron between three goat's heads erased each charged on the neck with an escallop three escallops) and presented by him to Barnstaple mayor and corporation, is displayed in the Dodderidge Room of Barnstaple Guildhall. Following his flight from justice to Portugal in 1753, the Crown seized his assets, including Halsbury.

=== Davie ===
Halsbury was sold by the Crown to John Davie of nearby Orleigh, grandson of the wealthy Bideford tobacco merchant John Davie (died 1710) of Orleigh.

- John Davie (died 1761), who married twice, firstly to Juliana Musgrave, daughter of Richard Musgrave of Frome, Somerset; secondly to Mary Courtenay (died 1754), daughter of Sir William Courtenay, 2nd Baronet (1675–1735) of Powderham and widow of John Langston of Park.
- John Davie (died 1793) (son by father's 1st wife), who in 1763 at Atherington married Eleanora Basset, sister and heiress of Francis Basset (died 1802) of Umberleigh and Heanton Punchardon in Devon. In antiquity and nobility of its origins the Basset family was comparable to the Giffards.
- Joseph Davie Basset (1764–1846) (son), born "Joseph Davie" who later assumed the surname "Basset" under the terms of his maternal inheritance from the Basset family.

=== Lee ===
Major Edward Lee (died 1819) purchased the estates of Halsbury and Orleigh from Joseph Davie Basset (1764–1846) who went on to build Watermouth Castle as his residence. Edward Lee bequeathed Orleigh (and possibly also Halsbury) to his nephew John Lee Lee (1802–1874) of Dillington House, near Ilminster in Somerset, Member of Parliament for Wells between 1830 and 1837 and Sheriff of Somerset in 1845–6.

== Sources ==
- Pevsner, Nikolaus & Cherry, Bridget, The Buildings of England: Devon, London, 2004
- Pole, Sir William (died 1635), Collections Towards a Description of the County of Devon, Sir John-William de la Pole (ed.), London, 1791.
- Prince, John, (1643–1723) The Worthies of Devon, 1810 edition.
- Risdon, Tristram (died 1640), Survey of Devon, 1811 edition, London, 1811, with 1810 Additions
- Taylor, M. C., biography of Thomas Benson, Barnstaple Heritage Booklet no. 5, Barnstaple, 2001
- Vivian, Lt.Col. J. L., (Ed.) The Visitations of the County of Devon: Comprising the Heralds' Visitations of 1531, 1564 & 1620, Exeter, 1895.
