= John Giffard (1602–1665) =

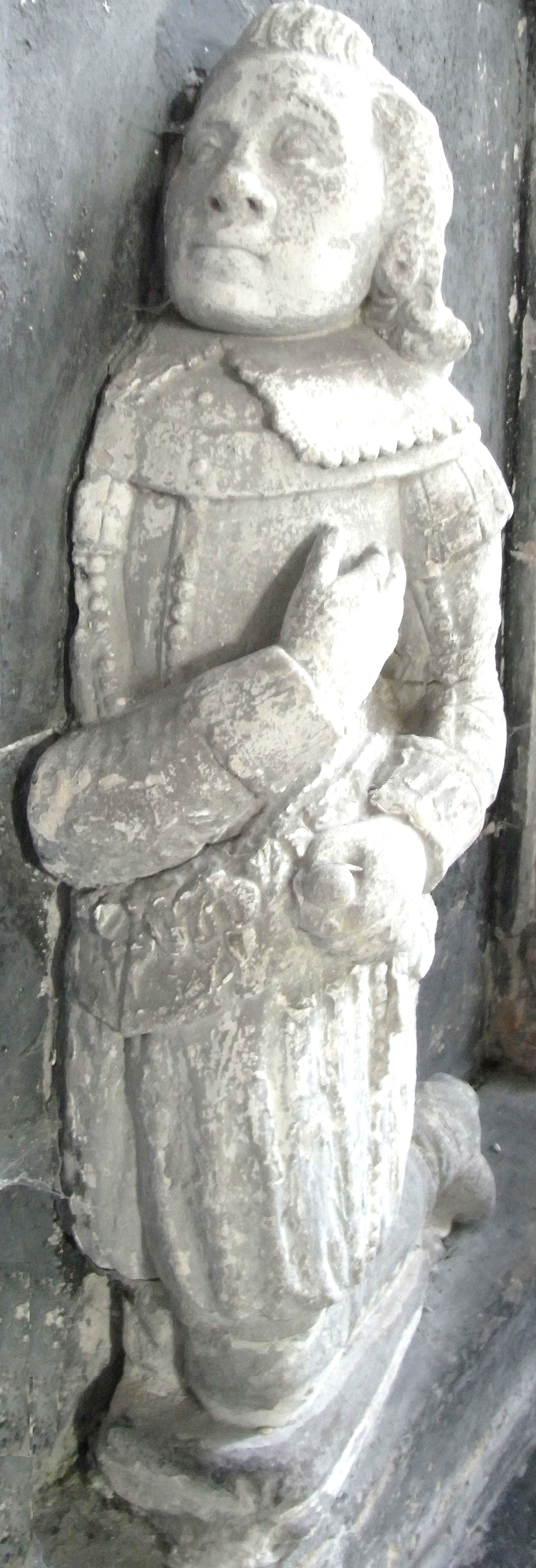
Effigy of John Giffard, Chittlehampton Church (Note: Depicted as a kneeling mourner aged 23 on the monument he erected in 1625 in the Giffard Chapel, Chittlehampton Church, in memory of his grandfather, John Gifford (died 1622) of Brightley.)

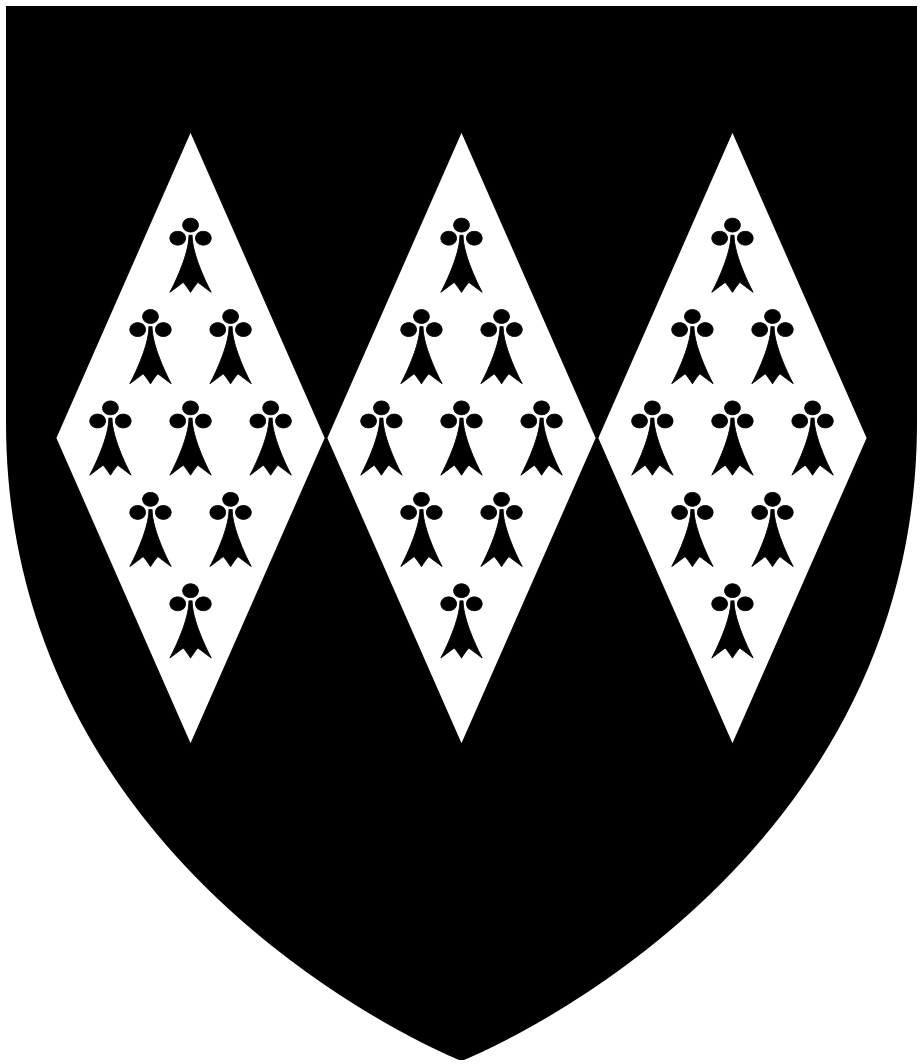
Arms of Giffard: Sable, three fusils conjoined in fess ermine

Colonel John Giffard (1602–1665), (pron. "Jiffard") of Brightley in the parish of Chittlehampton, Devon, England, was a Royalist leader during the Civil War. Giffard commanded the Devon Pikemen at the Battle of Lansdowne in 1643, in which his 3rd cousin the Royalist commander of the Cornish forces Sir Bevil Grenville (1596-1643) was killed in heroic circumstances. Giffard's loyalty to the Royalist cause led to him being proposed in 1660 as a knight of the intended Order of the Royal Oak. He was personally known to the biographer John Prince (1643–1723) who included him as one of his Worthies of Devon. He was buried in Chittlehampton Church, where his small kneeling effigy survives on the base of the monument he erected in 1625 to his grandfather.

== Family origins and early life ==
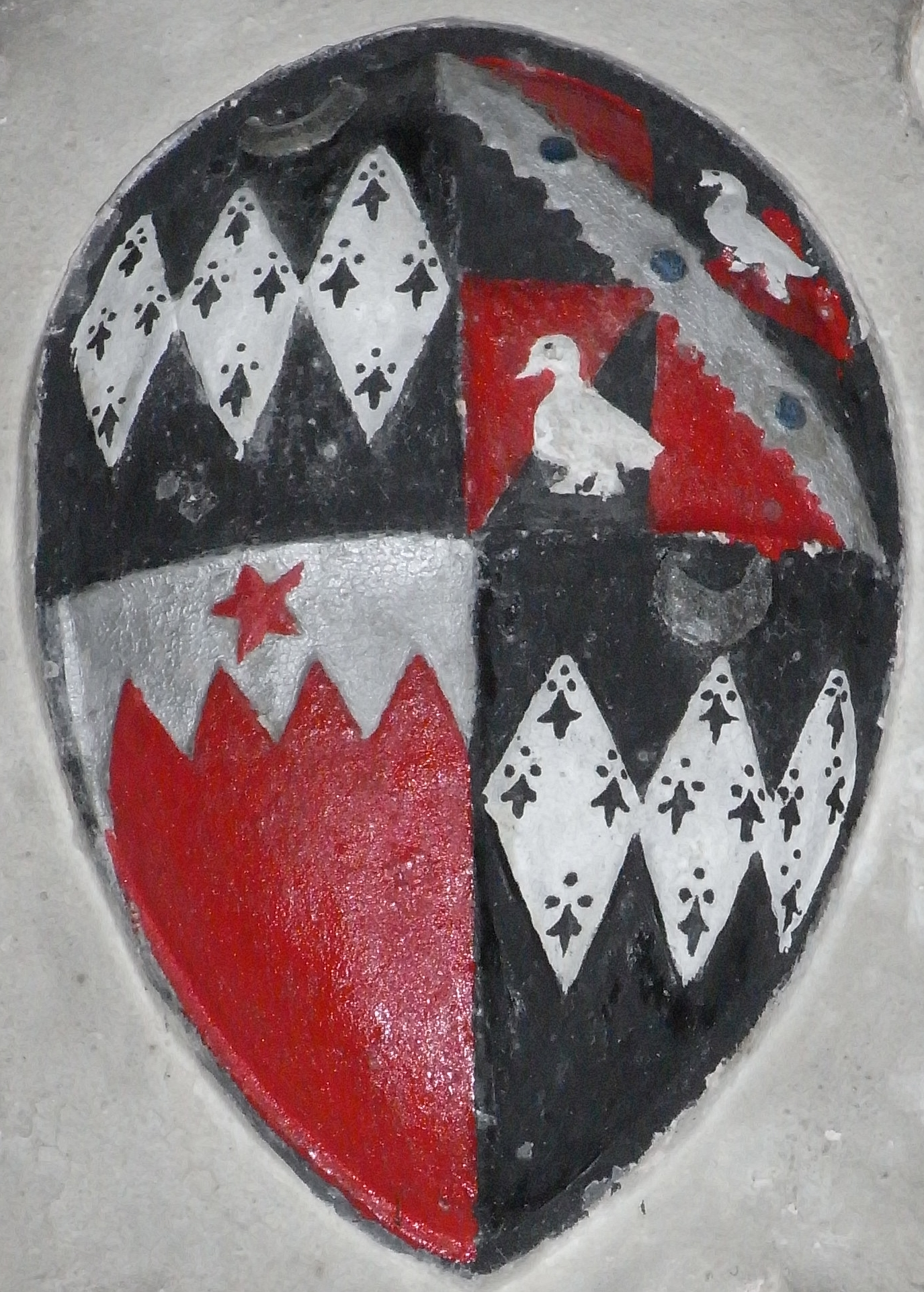
Heraldic cartouche from 1625 Giffard monument in Chittlehampton Church:Quarterly 1st & 4th, Giffard (with a crescent for difference); 2nd Coblegh of Brightley (Gyronny of eight gules and sable, between two swans argent each holding in his beak a cross crosslet fitchée on a bend engrailed argent three hurts); 3rd: Gules, on a chief indented argent a mullet of the first (FitzWarren of Brightley)

The Giffard family of Brightley was a junior branch of Giffard of Halsbury (pron. "Haulsbury") in the parish of Parkham, near Bideford. The Devon branch of the family were originally seated at Weare Giffard, near Great Torrington, at Awliscombe near Honiton and at Halsbury.

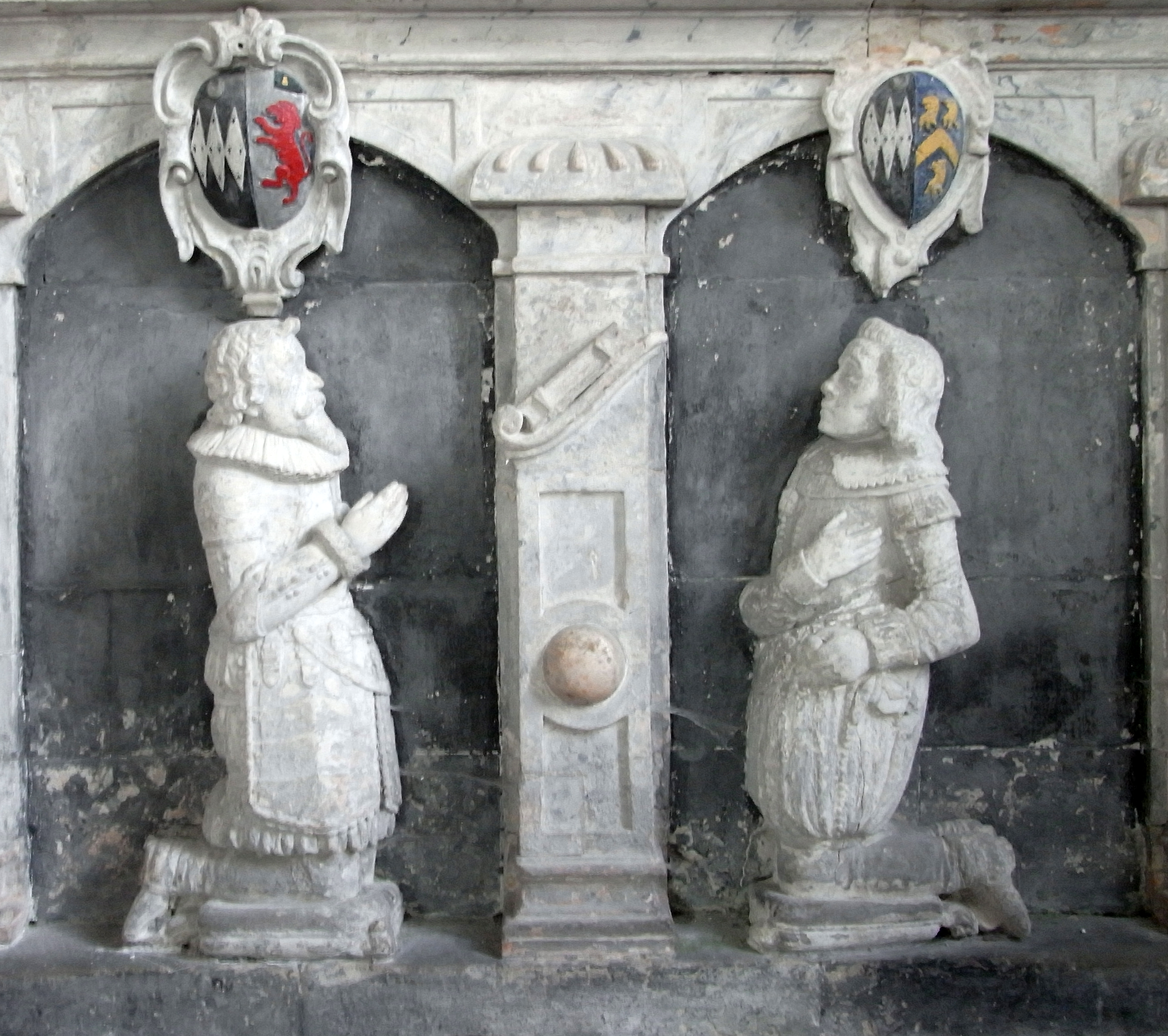
Kneeling effigies of (the future Col.) John Giffard aged 23, (right) opposite his father, Arthur Giffard (died 1616), (left) who kneels at a prie dieu. Detail from base of 1625 Giffard monument in Chittlehampton Church (Note: Above each is an heraldic escutcheon showing arms of Giffard impaling the arms of his respective wife. Above Arthur are shown the arms of Leigh of Burrough, Northam (Argent, a lion rampant gules on a sinister canton azure an escallop or and above John are shown the arms of Wyndham (Azure, a chevron between three lion's heads erased or).)

John Giffard was the eldest son and heir of Arthur Giffard (1580–1616) by his wife Agnes Leigh (died 1625), (Note: His mother was called Agnes by biographer John Prince, but called Anne in the Heralds' Visitations.) a daughter of Thomas Leigh of Burrough (anciently "Borow", "Borough", etc.) in the parish of Northam, near Bideford. Arthur had predeceased his own father John Giffard (died 1622), of Brightley, and thus Col. Giffard became heir to his grandfather. Arthur's mother was Honor Erle (1555-1638), a daughter of the courtier Walter Erle (d.1581) of Charborough in Dorset.

Col. Giffard's younger brother was Rev. Arthur Giffard (1605–1666), appointed in 1643 Rector of Bideford by his cousin Sir John Granville, 1st Earl of Bath (1628–1701) (Note: Framed list of Rectors of Bideford in Bideford Church.) of Stowe, Kilkhampton, Cornwall, and lord of the manor of Bideford, but forcefully ejected by the Parliamentarians during the Civil War.

According to Rev. Prince, who briefly served under Rev. Arthur Giffard at Bideford, John Giffard "had a virtuous and liberal education (and) became a very accomplished gentleman."

== Marriage and children ==
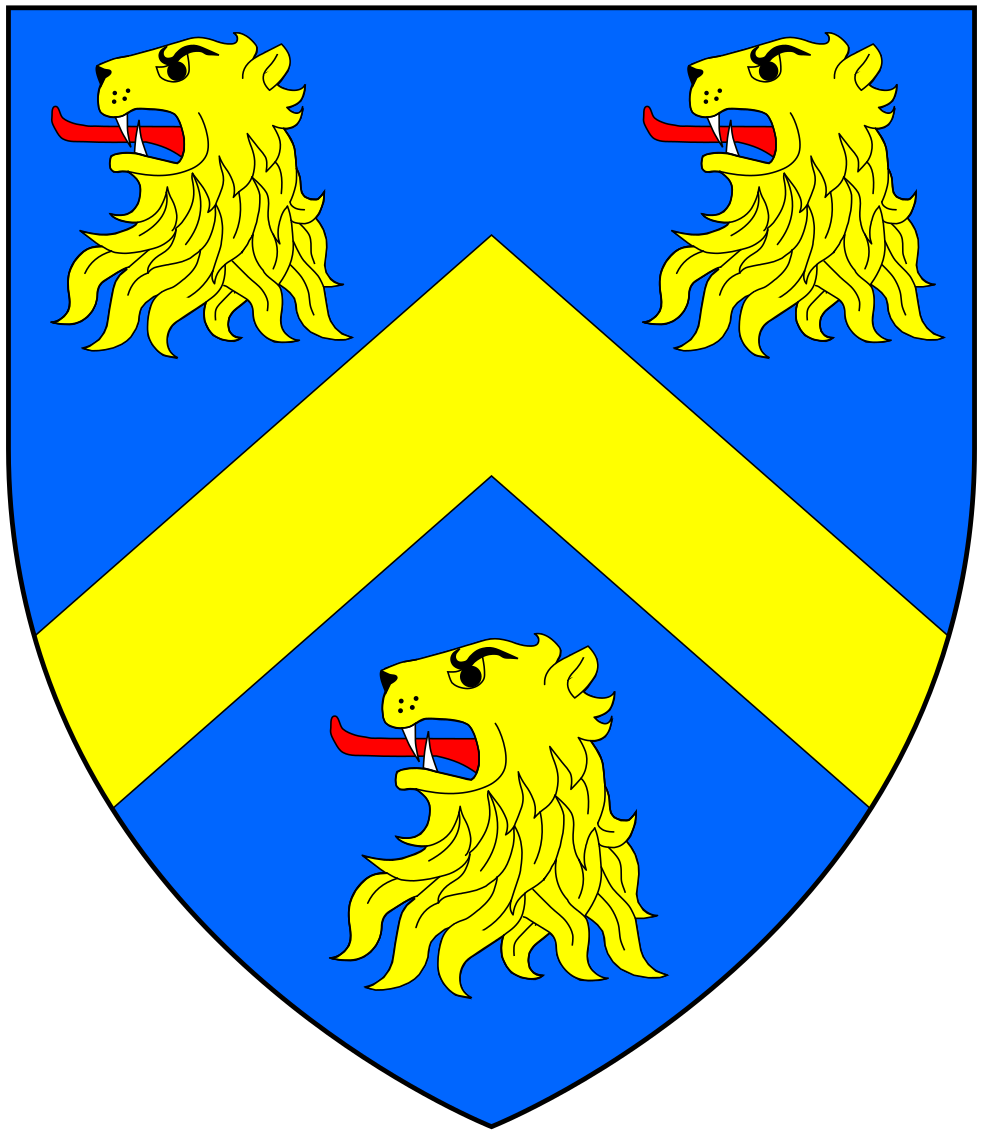
Arms of Wyndham: Azure, a chevron between three lion's heads erased or

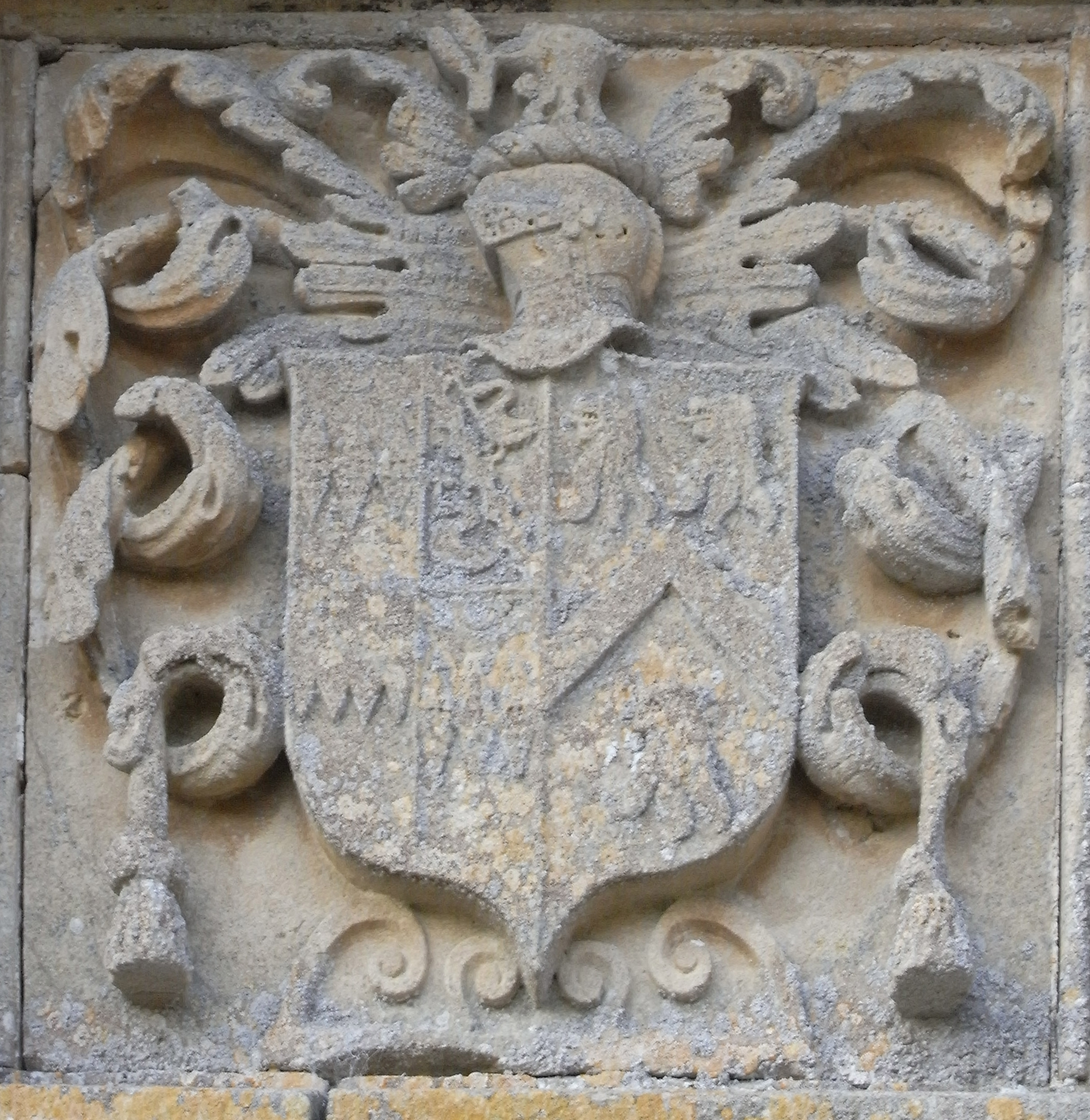
Stone heraldic escutcheon above porch, Brightley Barton, with escutcheon signifying the marriage of Col. John Giffard and Joan Wyndham. (Note: Brightley Barton was erected by Col. John Giffard (1602–1665), after 1622 when he inherited the property from his grandfather. The escutcheon shows the arms of Giffard impaling Wyndham, the family of his wife Joan: Baron: Quarterly 1st & 4th, Giffard; 2nd Coblegh of Brightley; 3rd: Gules, on a chief indented argent a mullet of the first (FitzWarren of Brightley); Feme: Azure, a chevron between three lion's heads erased or (Wyndham). Atop the helm is the crest of Giffard: A cock's head erased in its beak an ear of wheat. This crest may be seen more clearly on the mural monument to Roger Giffard (died 1603) of Tiverton Castle, (5th son of Sir Roger Giffard by Margaret Coblegh) in the chancel of Tiverton Church.)

In 1621 Giffard married Joan Wyndham, a daughter of Sir John Wyndham (1558–1645), of Orchard Wyndham in Somerset. His father-in-law was a staunch Royalist, and it was partly due to his influence that later at the start of the Civil War Giffard was persuaded to take up arms against Parliament, as he stated as a mitigating factor in his "humble petition" to the victorious Parliament after the war. After the Restoration of 1660 Giffard and his wife had their portraits painted by Sir Peter Lely.

By Joan he had eight daughters and three sons. His son and heir, John Giffard (1639–1712), married twice: firstly in 1666 to Susannah Bampfylde, the fourth daughter of Sir John Bampfylde, 1st Baronet (c. 1610 – 1650), MP, of Poltimore and North Molton, by whom his eldest son and only surviving male heir was John Giffard (1668–1704). After Susannah died in 1670, John remarried in 1674 to Frances Fane, the second daughter of Rev. Hon. William Fane, canon of Wells and rector of Huntspill, Somerset, whose father was Francis Fane, 1st Earl of Westmorland. Frances was the niece of Rachel Fane, the wife of Henry Bourchier, 5th Earl of Bath of Tawstock, Giffard's near neighbour under whom he served as a Commissioner of Array at the start of the Civil War. By Frances he had at least two sons, Henry and Caesar. In 1737 Caesar's daughters sold the estate of Brightley.

Giffard's other sons were Roger (1646–1724) and Henry (died 1658). Roger inherited, by a lifetime settlement, the ancient Giffard estate of Halsbury from his distant cousin John Giffard (born 1611) of Halsbury, whose only male issue, Thomas Giffard had died childless in 1659.

Of Giffard's daughters, Grace died at Sherborne in 1667 after being pricked by a fern. Her reclining effigy exists in Chittlehampton Church, as a remnant of her former large monument. Another daughter, Agnes, was the second wife of Thomas Bere (1631–1680), lord of the manor of Huntsham.

== Landholdings ==
On 14 October 1638 Giffard purchased the lordship of the manor of Chittlehampton from Sir Lewis Pollard, 1st Baronet of King's Nympton, and thereby became the first recorded resident lord. His manorial court rolls survive for the years 1640 and 1641, which show that he held the manors of Brightley (attached to which was Shortridge, both held in demesne); Chittlehampton; Stowford and Snape (both in High Bickington); Tapeley and Halsannery, both near Bideford. The matters determined upon by the court, stated in Latin with an English translation, included orders to tenants to repair the "cucckinstoole, to repair a chimney, a "lynney house" and a "rooke nett".

== Role in the Civil War ==
At the start of the Civil War John Giffard was appointed one of the Commissioners of Array for Devon, under his near neighbour Henry Bourchier, 5th Earl of Bath of Tawstock, and was thus in part responsible for the unpopular task of raising troops in Devon for the royalists. On Tuesday 13 September 1642, with other fellow commissioners, he accompanied Bourchier to South Molton for the purpose of a public reading of the Commission to the townsfolk, which attempt was met with much hostility and resulted in an ignoble retreat. According to a letter written by an inhabitant of South Molton at the time, the party was met by an angry mob of over 1,000 persons armed with muskets, halberts, bills, clubs, pikes and poles who were "in a great rage with the mayor and his company for giving licence that they should enter and swore that if they did attempt anything there or read their commission of array they would beat them all down and kill them (even) if they were all hanged for it". Bourchier and Giffard were thus prevented from making any recruits in South Molton and withdrew.

On 23 or 24 September 1642 Hopton, lieutenant-general of Royalist forces in the West, on his march from Minehead in Somerset into Cornwall, before crossing the River Taw rested with his cavalry at Chittlehampton. 400 of his men were billeted in the parish It is possible that Giffard joined Hopton on his onward march as he was absent from the entertainment given on 22 December 1642 by Sir Hugh Pollard at King's Nympton to other of the royalist leaders in Devon, however it was said that he had absented himself from Brightley to avoid the expense of entertaining when his turn came. Hopton was later to emerge from Cornwall, strengthened by new recruits, to march up-country to Bath to engage the Parliamentarian forces at Lansdowne.

During the Civil War, by then a Colonel, Giffard commanded the Devon pikemen at the Battle of Lansdowne, fought on 5 July 1643, near Bath, Somerset. In that battle he served alongside his cousin Sir Bevil Grenville, who fell heroically having commanded the Cornish pikemen.

Following a setback to the Royalists Giffard claimed to have in 1644 "retired to live privately and peaceably in his own house". However at that time Brightley was garrisoned by 300 Royalist cavalry, watched closely from Brightley Bridge by the "Barnstaple Horse", a local troop of Parliamentarian cavalry. Giffard's younger brother George Giffard, a London merchant, sought advice from their cousin Walter Erle as to how John should make his surrender to Parliament. He was advised to take the earliest opportunity to do so, and thus following the departure of the royalist horse from Brightley, Giffard immediately sought an order of protection from Sir Thomas Fairfax, commander-in-chief of the Parliamentarian forces.

At the establishment of the Commonwealth, Giffard was sequestrated and imprisoned and paid a composition of £1,136. He had submitted to Parliament in mitigation of his actions a "humble petition" in which he stated that he had been persuaded by some of his relatives to take up arms against Parliament, and "did not clearly apprehend the drift of things"; he "...only acted very sparingly, doing what he was required to do to preserve his person, wife and children". These Royalist relatives of his were the Wyndhams, his wife's family, and the Grenvilles, lords of the manors of Bideford in Devon and Stowe, Kilkhampton in Cornwall, the head of which family was Sir Bevil Grenville, beside whom Giffard fought at Lansdowne.

The local population of Chittlehampton however disagreed. In a counter-petition they complained to Parliament that Giffard should not be permitted to compound for his delinquency, which refusal would therefore result in the confiscation of his estates. Twelve parishioners of Chittlehampton, all of whom claimed to have "always stood right and well affected to the Parliament", signed the counter-petition in which they called Giffard "a violent and active enemy to the state", who had persecuted them "with all eagerness and cruelty", and had caused them and others losses valued at five to six thousand pounds.

Giffard's petition was accepted by the local Commissioners of Parliament for Devon, namely Sir Samuel I Rolle (c. 1588 – 1647), MP, of Heanton Satchville, Petrockstowe and Sir John Northcote, 1st Baronet (died 1676) of Newton St Cyres, and he was thus allowed to compound for the sum of £1,136, equating to three times his net annual income.

Following the Restoration of the Monarchy in 1660 Giffard was selected by King Charles II as one of the proposed fourteen Devonshire Knights of the Royal Oak. This honour was proposed for the Englishmen who had actively supported that king during his exile in France, but was abandoned before being formally established lest it might perpetuate dissension.

== Death and burial ==
Giffard died in 1665 at Brightley and was buried among his ancestors in Chittlehampton parish church. His image survives as a kneeling figure on the monument in the Giffard Chapel in Chittlehampton Church he erected himself in 1625 in memory of his grandfather, John Gifford (died 1622) of Brightley. In his will he bequeathed £1,000 to each of his five unmarried daughters.

== Assessment by John Prince ==
The Devon biographer Rev. John Prince (1643–1723) who had served under Rev. Arthur Giffard at Bideford as a young curate and thus had personal knowledge of the family, included Giffard in his magnum opus Worthies of Devon and wrote of him as follows:

He was a gentleman of a very grave and comely aspect, of an obliging carriage, of a sober life, and a pious conversation. Such was his deportment towards men, in all his actions, as if he were conscious the eye of God was upon him; and such his behaviour towards God, in the instance of devotion and religion, as if he thought he was a spectacle to angels and to men. Insomuch, his sobriety and piety brought great reputation to the royal cause in those parts where he lived; and he was an excellent ornament to his profession, both as a subject and a Christian.
Among all the instances of the piety of this worthy gentleman, unto whom I had the honour of being personally known, that must not be forgotten which he did to the memory of his grandfather; for in the north isle of the parish church of Chittlehampton aforesaid, he erected a monument to him of alabaster (sic) of great cost and curiosity; (Note: Curiosity, i.e. of careful workmanship, from Latin cura care.) where his similitude in armor is lively represented, and the whole adorned with escutcheons of the family

== Sources ==
- Andrews, Rev. J.H.B., "Chittlehampton", Transactions of the Devonshire Association, vol.94, 1962, pp. 233–338.
- Andriette, Eugene A., Devon and Exeter in the Civil War, Newton Abbot: David & Charles, 1971.
- Prince, John The Worthies of Devon. A new edition, with notes. London, 1810.
- Vivian, Lt.Col. J.L., (Ed.) The Visitations of the County of Devon: Comprising the Heralds' Visitations of 1531, 1564 & 1620. Exeter, 1895.
