= Ernsborough =

Historic estate in Devon, England

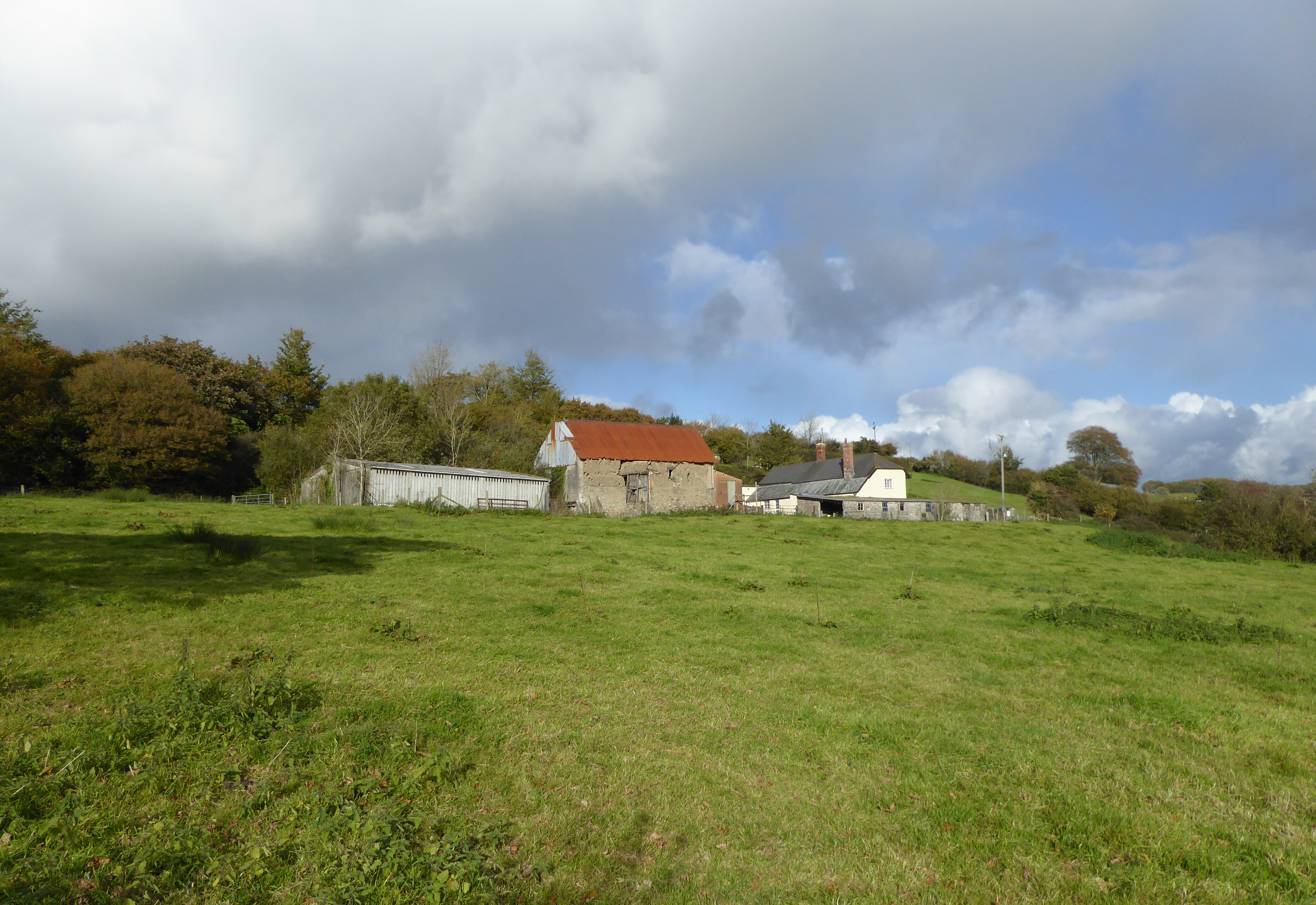
"Tower Farm", supposed site of the ancient mansion house of Ernsborough, view from south-east

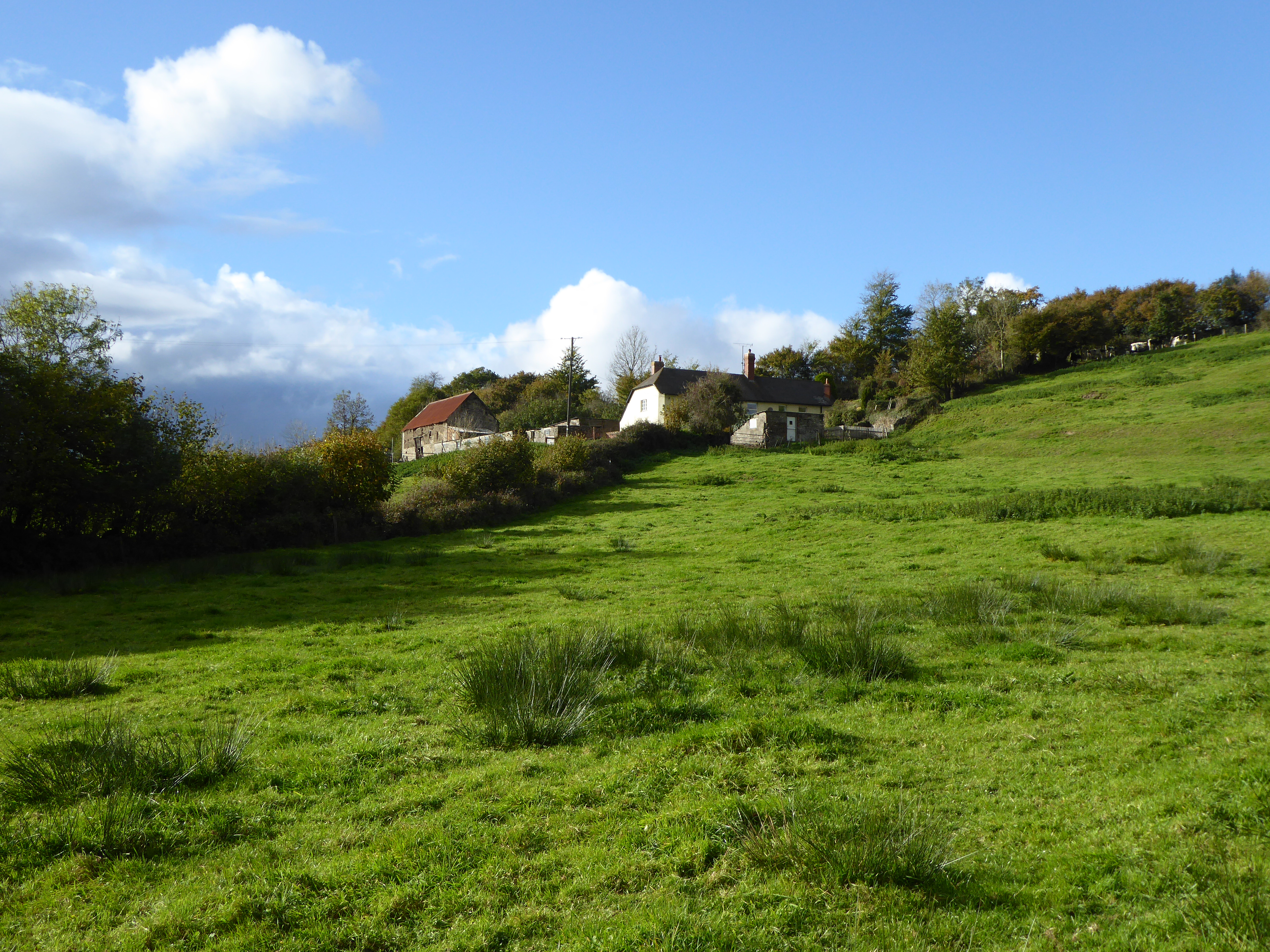
"Tower Farm", view from south-west

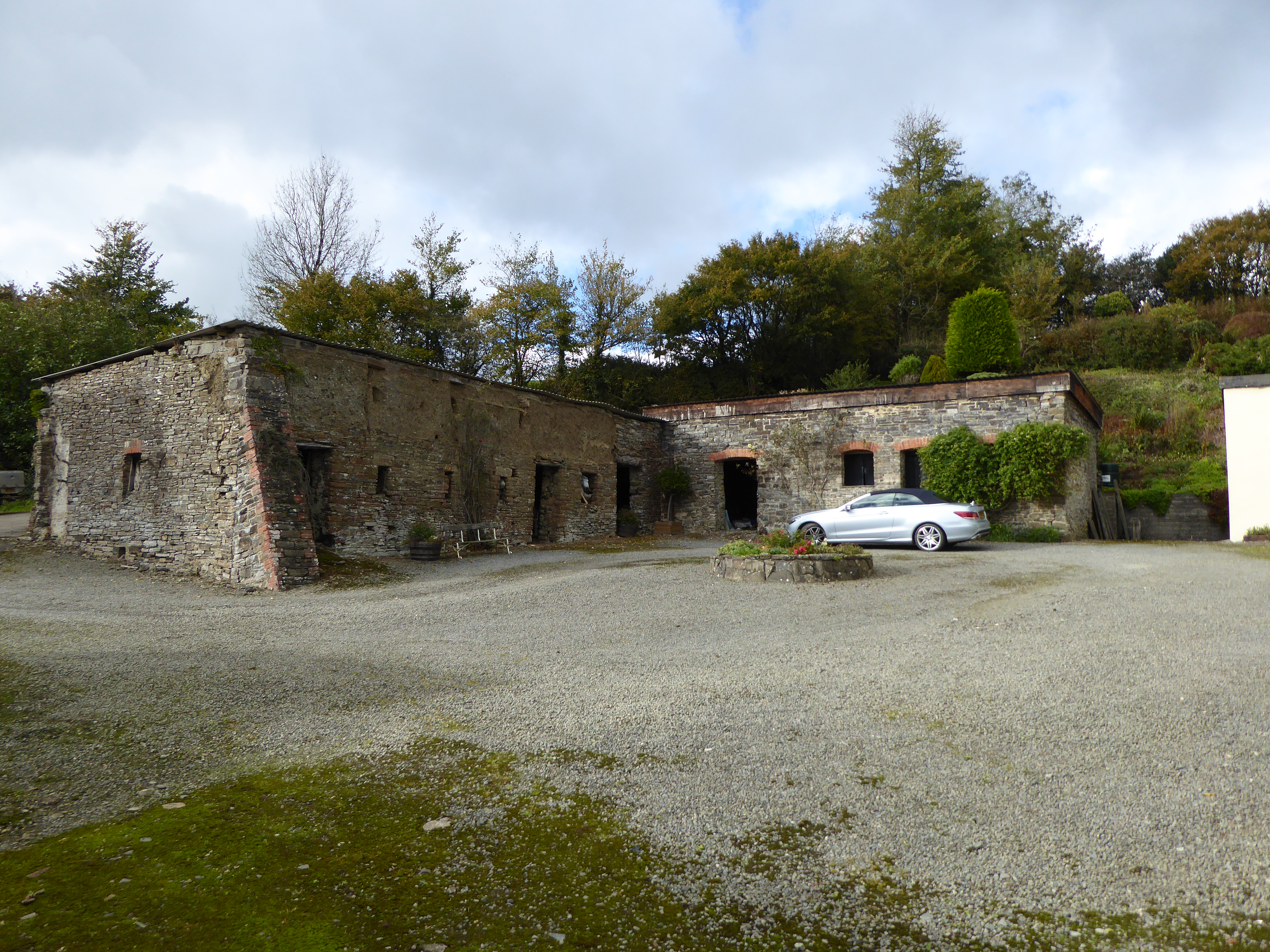
Old farm buildings at Tower Farm

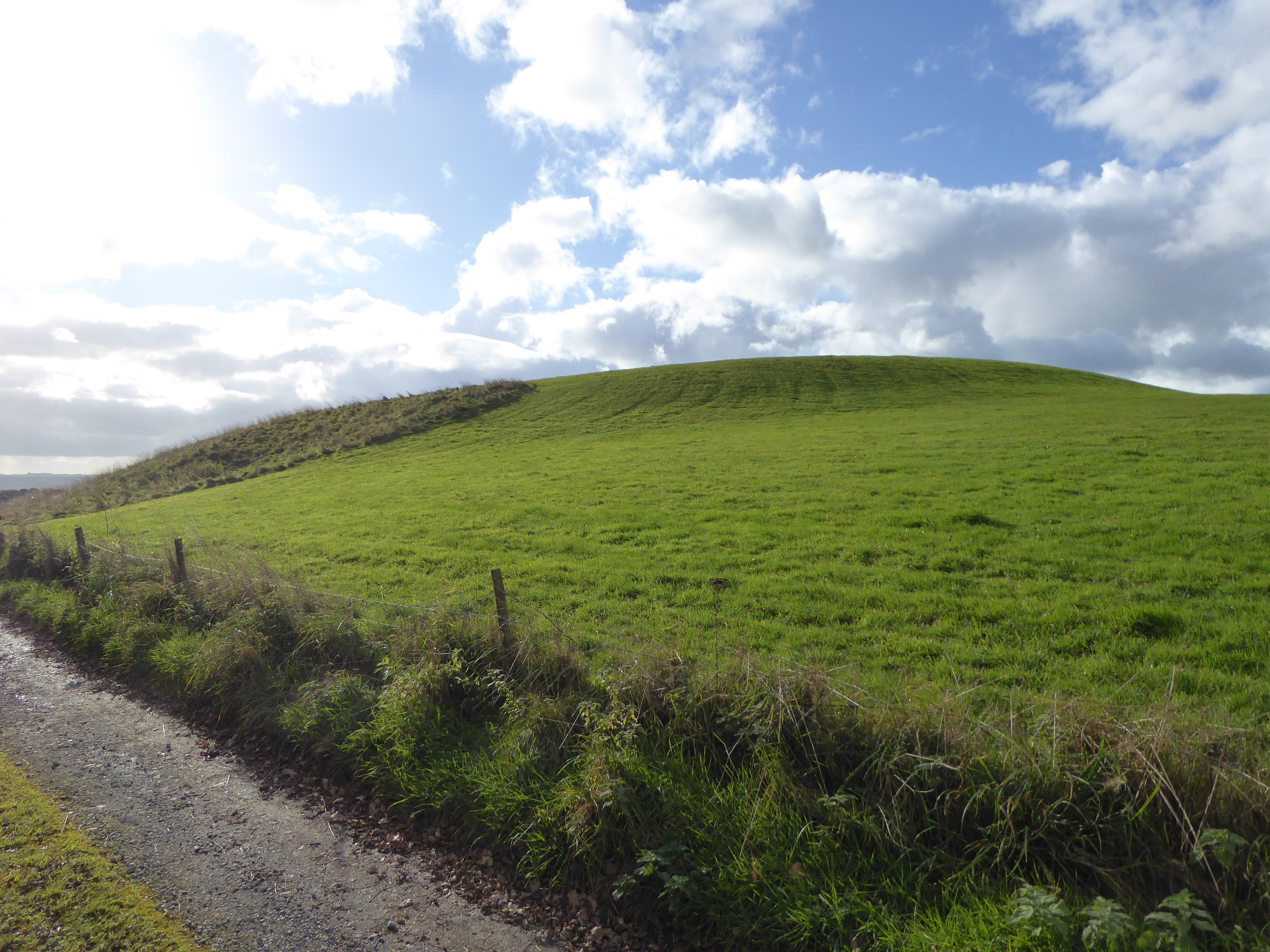
Hill-top mound, approach to Tower Farm

Ernsborough (modern: "Irishborough") is a historic Saxon estate dating from the 9th or 11th century, situated in the parish of Swimbridge in Devon, England, about 2 miles south-east of the village of Swimbridge. It is best remembered today for having contained during the 14th century a high-status mansion house, occupied by the Mules or De Moels family, closely related to Baron Moels of Somerset.

== History ==
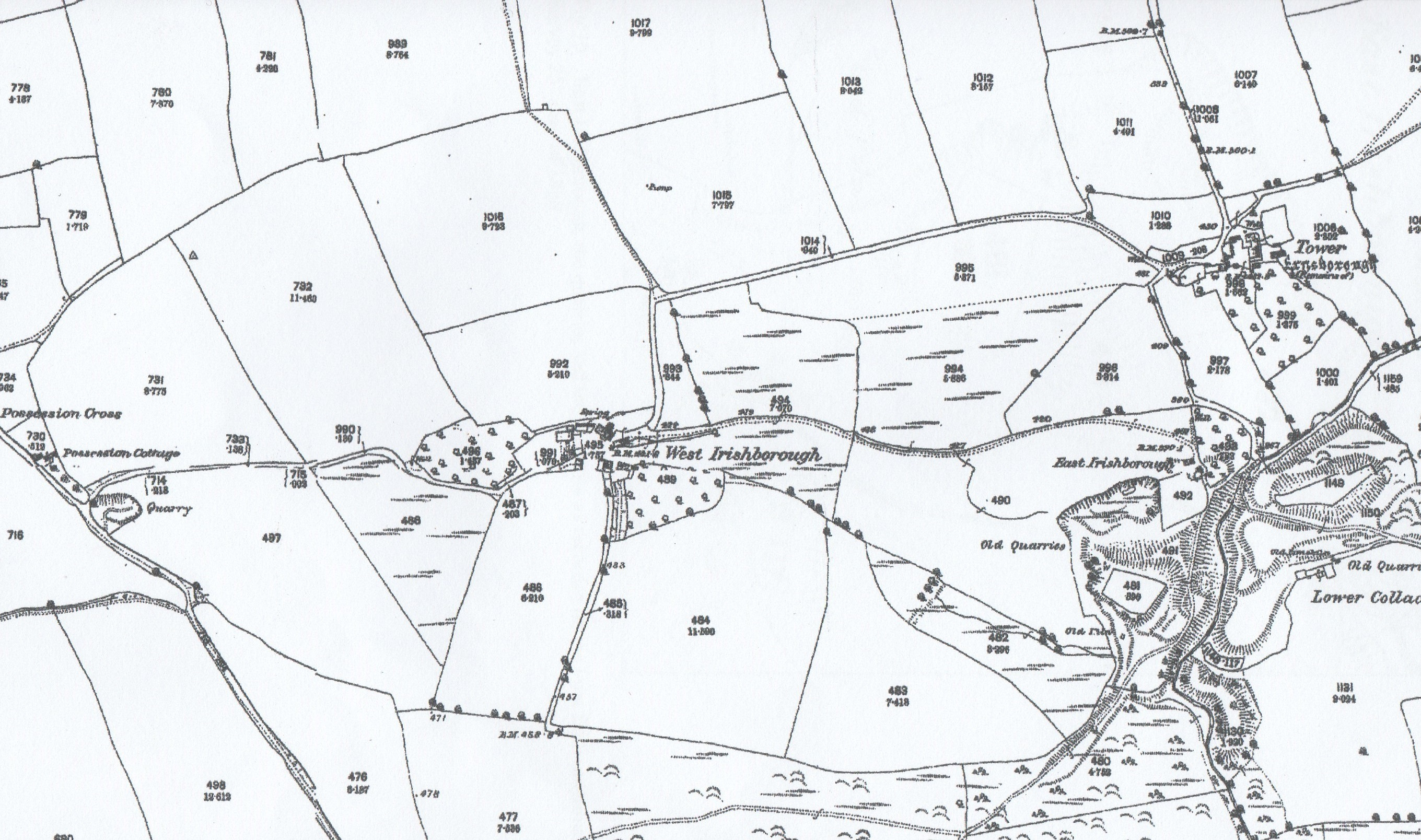
The curvi-linear shoe-shaped field boundary around today's West Irishborough Farm suggest a 9th-11th century Saxon land enclosure, pre-dating the grid-like field boundaries around it. Such estates usually had a farm settlement or hamlet on the periphery, which is the site of Tower Farm on the east (West Irishborough in the centre being a 19th c. development). 1888 Ordnance Survey map

The estate of Ernsborough clearly pre-dates the Norman Conquest of 1066, as is suggested by the name which is of West-Saxon origin signifying "Eagle's hill, mound or burial mound (barrow)" (Earnes Beorh/Beorg), or "Eagle's fortified place" (-burh/burg). The West Saxons reached Devon in the 8th century, but the name may be even earlier, if deemed a translation of a Celtic name. The boundary of the Saxon estate is still recognisable today in the form of a curvi-linear hedgebank, and contains or abuts three historic settlements: on the eastern side "Tower Farm", so named after 1845 and probably the original location of the mansion house of Ernsborough; "East Irishborough", to the immediate south-west of Tower Farm, shown on the Ordnance Survey map of 1888 but since demolished, and to the west in the centre of the enclosure, the farm of "West Irishborough". Such a three-settlement arrangement is common with many ancient Devonshire estates.

Ernsborough is not recorded in the Domesday Book of 1086; the estate first appears in surviving records in the Pipe Rolls of 1175.

Until the Dissolution of the Monasteries in the 16th century, the Bishop of Exeter was the lord of the manor of Bishop's Tawton, a large manor which included the parishes of Swimbridge and Landkey. The bishop was a major landholder who was seated at the Bishop's Palace in Exeter. Thus in the absence of a manor house with a great hall in which the lord's steward could transact manorial business, a court house would have been required. After the Dissolution of the Monasteries the lord of the manor of Bishop's Tawton was the Earl of Bedford, later Duke of Bedford, also non-resident. In 1773 the mansion house was a ruin, with only a tower remaining.

Much quarrying work and lime burning was carried out on the estate in the 19th century and prior, which has left major traces on the landscape. An unusually shaped lime-kiln survives, with several flooded quarries.

== Descent ==
=== de Ernsborough ===
The earliest history of Ernsborough is given by Tristram Risdon (died 1640), who stated that the first recorded holder of Ernsborough was Baldwin de Ernsborough, living at the start of the reign of King Henry III (1216–1272). The de Ernsborough family held the estate for a further three generations, when it passed to the Flavell family.

=== Faluel ===
The Faluel family, a Norman family often cited as "Flavelle" because the "l" and "a" were reversed in handwritten documents (modern spelling is Fallwell), held Ernsborough after the de Ernsboroughs. They eventually died out without a male heir. The last in the male line obtained the wardship and marriage of the young Roger Mules (described by Risdon as "sir Roger Mules, second son to the Lord Mules, Baron of North-Cadbury in Somersetshire") and married him off to his own daughter and heiress, as was his right. Thus Ernesborough descended into the Mules family.

=== Mules ===
Arms of Moels /Mules: Argent, two bars gules in chief three torteaux, ceiling boss of St Bridget's Chapel (North Chancel Chapel), Swimbridge Church, built by the third John Mules (fl.1428) of Ernsborough

==== Origin of Mules ====
The identity of Sir Roger Mules "second son to the Lord Mules" and husband of the heiress of Ernsborough, is uncertain. The first certain ancestor of the 1st Baron Moels was his grandfather Nicholas de Moels (c. 1195 – 1264/72) of North Cadbury in Somerset, of unknown parentage, a household knight and royal administrator of King Henry III, who apart from having received a few royal grants of land in his own right, in 1230 married Hawise de Newmarch the wealthy co-heiress of the feudal barony of North Cadbury, which transformed him into a major landholder and feudal baron. In 1230 he was granted by King Henry III the Devonshire manors of King's Carswell and Diptford. His second but eldest surviving son by Hawise was Roger de Moels (c.1233/7 – 1294) (father of the 1st Baron), who in 1268 received a grant of a weekly market and annual fair at his manor of King's Carswell In 1293 he was appointed Keeper of the Forest of Braydon in Wiltshire.

==== Roger Moels of Lustleigh (d.1323) ====
Strapwork escutcheon showing arms of de Moels impaling Prouse (Sable, three lions rampant argent), detail from monument to Sir John Chichester (died 1569), of Raleigh, Pilton, about 4 miles north-west of Ernsborough, descended from the daughter and heiress of the marriage represented here between Roger Moels (died 1323) of Lustleigh and Alice Prouse (1286–1335)

It is believed that the second son of Roger de Moels (c.1233/7-1294), feudal baron of North Cadbury (and thus a brother of the 1st Baron) was a certain Sir Roger de Moels (d.1323) of Lustleigh in Devon, called a "King's Yeoman" in 1301, who married Alice le Prouz (1286–1335), daughter and heiress of Sir William le Prouz (or Prouse) of Gidleigh Castle, Chagford and of Lustleigh, by his wife Alice de Reyny (said by Vivian (1895) to have been Alice Widworthy, daughter and heiress of Sir Hugh Widworthy, who remarried to Sir John Damerell. The Prouz family was the heir of the Widworthys of Lustleigh, according to Risdon). Roger de Moels (died 1323) of Lustleigh is known to have had a son William de Moels (fl.1318), possibly by an earlier wife.

Nicholas de Moels, 2nd Baron Moels (died 1316) certainly had a Devonshire connection as he married Margaret Courtenay (died 1349) a daughter of Sir Hugh de Courtenay (died 1292), feudal baron of Okehampton and father of Hugh de Courtenay, 1st/9th Earl of Devon (died 1340), but died without issue.

==== Descent of Mules ====
The descent from Roger Mules and his wife the Flavell heiress was as follows:

- John Mules,
- John Mules (son), who may have been the John Mules who in 1373 married Joan de Adeston, a daughter and co-heiress of Gilbert de Adeston of Adeston in the parish of Holbeton, Devon, and widow of John Prideaux, 2nd son of Sir John Prideaux of Orcharton, Modbury, Devon.

===== John Mules (fl.1428) =====
John Mules (fl.1428), (son of the second John Mules), who, being childless, according to "R.J.M." (1952) in 1428 transferred Ernsborough to his brother Thomas Mules. It was apparently this John Mules [evidently not the one who was childless] who is recorded in the Heraldic Visitations of Devon as having married twice:

- Firstly to a certain Elizabeth, by whom he had two daughters and co-heiresses:
  - Isabell Mules, eldest daughter, who married John Dabernon (alias D'Abernon, etc.) of Dunsland in the parish of Bradford, Devon, son and heir of John Daubernon, Warden of the Stannary and of the Fees of the duchy of Cornwall, a Member of Parliament for Devon in 1356 or 1357, by his wife Thomasine Cade (or Cadiho, heiress of Dunsland. In his will dated 1422 John D'Abernon requested to be buried in the "newly built aisle", of Swimbridge Church, a reference to the surviving St Bridget's Chapel, built by his father-in-law the third John Mules (see below). By Isabell Mules he had two daughters and co-heiresses:
    - Elizabeth Dabernon, eldest daughter, who married John Battyn, son and heir of John Battyn of Exeter in Devon. The ultimate heiress of this marriage was Phillipa Battyn, wife of John Arscott (1494–1563) of Arscott in the parish of Holsworthy, Devon, who founded the prominent line of Arscott of Dunsland.
    - Joan Dabernon, 2nd daughter, who married John Giffard of Halsbury in the parish of Parkham, Devon, ancestor of Hardinge Giffard, 1st Earl of Halsbury (1823–1921) Lord High Chancellor of Great Britain.
  - Alicia Mules, younger daughter, who married Otes Gilbert (1417–1492) of Compton Castle, in the parish of Marldon, Devon, whose effigy survives in Marldon Church
- Secondly, in 1422, the third John Mules (fl.1428) married a certain Johanna, who survived him and married secondly to Sir John Norby. Humphreys (2003) mentions an unreferenced note suggesting that in about 1500 a certain Sir John Norbury lived at Ernscombe.

Thus, as summarised by Humphreys (2003) (relying on Lysons (1822)): "A female descendant brought it to the family of D'Abernon and a further female brought it to Gifford".

==== Later descendants ====
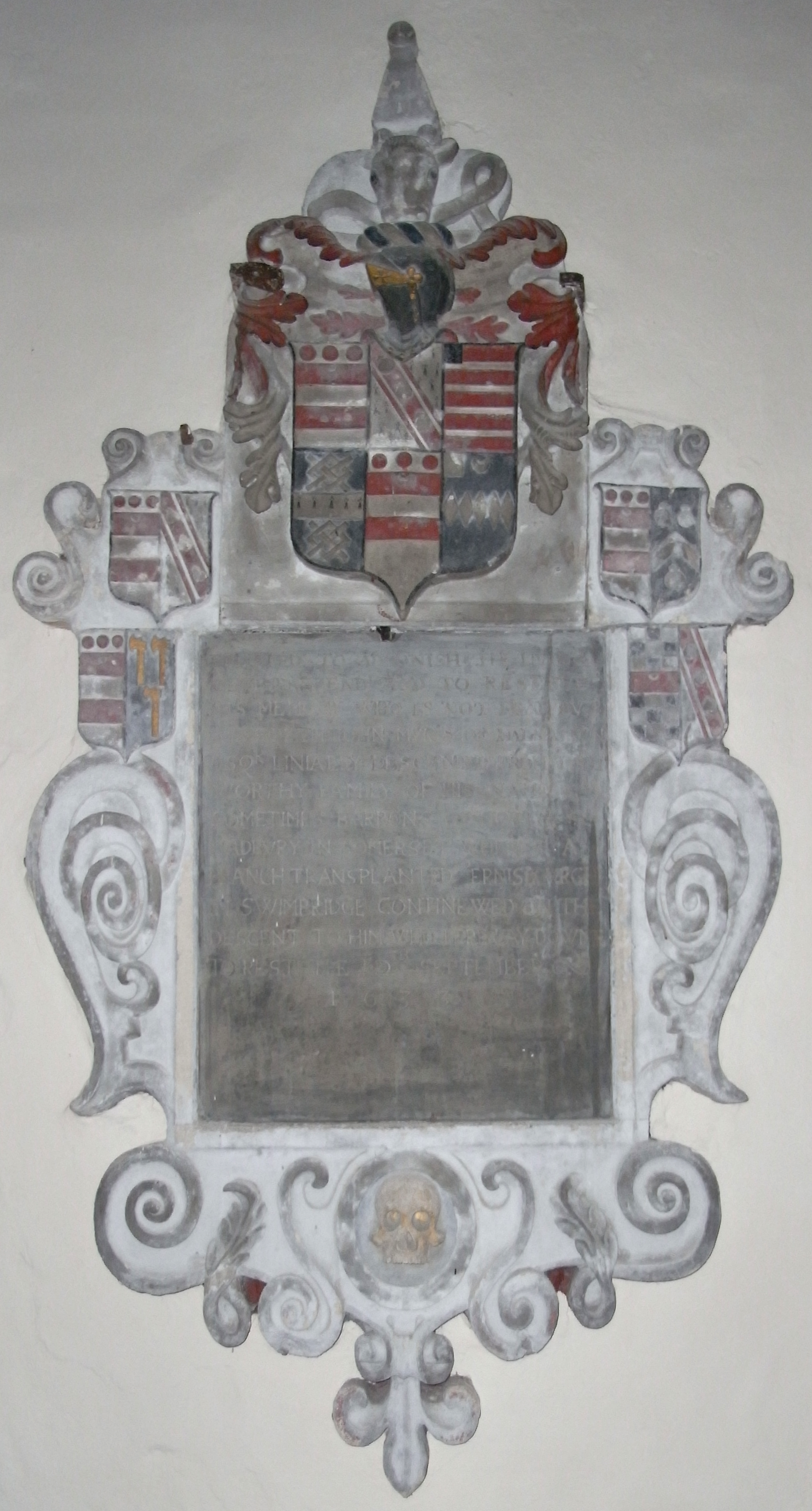
Monument to John Mules (died 1633) of Halmeston in the parish of Bishop's Tawton

A monument to John Mules (died 1633) of Halmeston in the parish of Bishop's Tawton (next to Swimbridge on the south) survives in Bishop's Tawton Church. This mentions the descent of the Mules family of Ernsborough as follows:

"... John Mulys of Halmeston, Esq., lineally descended from that worthy family of his name Barons of North Cadbury in Somerset whence a branch transplanted to Ernisborough in Swimbridye continewed on the descente to him who here lay down to rest the 12th September 1633".

Risdon wrote as follows:

"Halmeston, in this tything" [Bishops-Tawton] "was the land of Fulk in King Edward III's time, by whose co-heir Alice, Baldwin Ackland was invested therewith, which descended to Joan her heir, married to Thomas Mules, second son of Thomas Mules of Ernesborough in King Henry V's time;" [1413–1422] "and so lineally after six descents to John Mules the late lord thereof, who married the daughter of Chafe; his father the heir of Yeomans of Northamptonshire. His only daughter and heir Anne was married to Bennet."

=== Cowell ===
The Cowell family later occupied Ersborough, whether as tenants or freeholders is unknown. At Ernesborough was born the jurist John Cowell (1554–1611), Master of Trinity Hall Cambridge, and author of "The Interpreter", the well-known dictionary of legal terms.

=== 18th century ===
In 1773 the mansion house was a ruin, with only a tower remaining. In 1902 "Irishborough manor house" was the property of Rev. Henry Tubal Hole, Rector of Plympton St. Maurice. The site is today covered by the central settlement of "West Irishborough", which in the 18th century had the status of barton or principal farm, and to the east on the edge of the historic curvi-linear estate, "Tower Farm", believed to have been the site of the mansion house of the Mules family.

=== 19th century ===
On the 1845 Tithe Apportionment "Tower Farm" is listed as being partly owned by Earl Fortescue, of nearby Castle Hill, Filleigh, and partly by John Nott of Bydown House, Swimbridge, whose family had been yeomen farmers in Swimbridge for many centuries but had recently acquired much wealth having married a wealthy heiress. "Irishborough", a larger estate (probably today's "West Irishborough", probably of mediaeval origin, on which no substantial farmhouse existed in 1845, only farm-buildings and cottages) is listed as being owned by Henry Hole.

==== Nott descent from Mules ====
19th c. Nott family brass tablet, Swimbridge Church

Arms of Nott (Gules, on a bend engrailed or between four leopard's faces two and two argent an estoile of eight points between two martlets of the first) impaling Mules, detail from Nott family brass tablet, Swimbridge Church

John Nott (1805–1856) of Bydown House, who was the lessee of the tithes of Swimbridge, himself claimed descent from the Mules family of Ernsborough, by the 1762 marriage of his grandfather James Nott (died 1790) to Emme Mules, a daughter of John Mules of Tawstock, which parish is situated across the River Taw from Bishop's Tawton.

A late 19th century brass memorial tablet affixed to the outer wall of St Bridget's Chapel in Swimbridge Church, states that John Nott (9 Feb 1690 – 9 May 1756) was married to "Amy, daughter of John Mules, Esqre, lineally descended through Mules of Helmeston and Ernsborough in this parish (of whom was Sir John de Moeles or Mules who built this aisle) ..."

== Sources ==
- Cherry, Bridget & Pevsner, Nikolaus, The Buildings of England: Devon. Yale University Press, 2004. ISBN 978-0-300-09596-8
- The Complete Peerage, 2nd edition. Vol. IX, 1936.
- Humphreys, Colin, West Irishborough Farm / Rubble Hills, Chittlehampton, North Devon: Archaeological Assessment, Barnstaple, 2003. (report deposited for public reference in the Devon County Sites and Monuments Register, Exeter)
- Risdon, Tristram (died 1640), Survey of Devon. With considerable additions. London, 1811.
- Vivian, Lt.Col. J.L., (Ed.) The Visitations of the County of Devon: Comprising the Heralds' Visitations of 1531, 1564 & 1620. Exeter, 1895.
