= List of Worthies of Devon =

This is a list of persons considered by John Prince (1643–1723) sufficiently notable to warrant the inclusion of their biography in his work The Worthies of Devon.

== The Worthies of Devon ==
While at Berry Pomeroy, John Prince worked on his magnum opus: a biography of his home county's many notable figures, which he probably finished in 1697. The book ran to 600 pages, with woodcuts to illustrate the 191 biographies. He struggled to find funding for it; most publishers able to handle such a large book were based in London or Oxbridge. The printer was forced to advertise for subscribers while the book languished for four years until its first publication in 1701.

It is evident that Prince was over-ambitious in his work. The alphabetical entries from A to H fill half the book, while L to Z are squeezed into the final quarter, as money problems took their toll on his inclusions. A second volume, detailing 115 entries chosen by Prince to redress the balance, was never published.

== Biographies included ==
The following biographies appear in the 1810 edition of the book (Prince's spelling retained):

- Ackland, Sir John (d.1620), knight
- Ackland, Baldwin, B.D
- Adams, William
- Alphred, Bishop of Crediton
- Ash, Simon
- Ashly, or Astley, Herbert, Dean of Norwich
- Atwell, Hugh, M.D
- Audley, James, Lord
- Babington, Gervais (1550–1610), Lord Bishop of Worcester
- Baldwin (1125–1190), Archbishop of Canterbury
- Ball, Sir Peter, Knight
- Bampfeild, Sir Copleston, Bart (1633–1692)
- De Bampton, John, D.D
- Barkham, John, D.D
- Barry, Robert
- Baskervile, Sir Simon, Knight
- Basset, Colonel Arthur
- Bath, Sir Henry, Knight, Justice of King's Bench
- Bawceyn, Sir Stephen, Knight
- Beaumont, Lord Richard, Viscount Main (1138–1194)
- Berry, Sir John, Knight
- Bidgood, John, M.D
- Blondy, Richard (d.1257), Lord Bishop of Exeter
- Bluet, Colonel Francis
- Blundell, Peter
- Bodley, Sir Thomas (1545–1613)
- Bodley, Lawrence, D.D
- Bodley, Sir Josias (1550-1618), Knight
- Bogan, Zachary, M.A
- Bonvill, Lord William
- Bracton, Henry (1210–1268), Lord Chief Justice
- Brentingham, Thomas (d.1394) Lord Bishop of Exeter
- Brewer, Lord William
- Brewer, William, Lord Bishop of Exeter
- Brian, Lord Guy
- Bridgeman, John, Lord Bishop of Chester
- Britte, Walter
- Bronscombe, Waller, Lord Bishop of Exeter
- Browne, William
- Budeokshed, Robert, Esquire
- Burchard, Bishop of Wurtzburgh
- Burgoin, William, Esquire
- Burlegh, Captain John
- Bury, John, Canon of Exeter
- Cardmaker, alias Taylor, John
- Carew, Sir John, Knight
- Carew, Thomas, Esquire
- Carew, George, Baron of Clopton
- Carpenter, Nathaniel, B.D
- Cary, Sir John, Knight
- Cary, John, Lord Bishop of Exeter
- Cary, Sir George, Knight
- Cary, George, D.D
- Champernon, Sir Arthur, Knight
- Chard, Thomas, D.D
- Chardon, or Charldon, John, Lord Bishop of Down and Conor
- Chauntor, The, John (d.1191), Lord Bishop of Exeter
- Chichester, Robert (d.1160), Lord Bishop of Exeter
- Chichester, Sir Arthur (1563–1625), Knight
- Chilcot, Robert
- Childe, 214
- Chudlegh, Sir George, Baronet
- Cistertian, The, Roger
- Clifford, Lord Thomas, Baron of Chudlegh
- Cocke, Captain
- Coffin, Sir William, Knight
- Conant, John, D.D
- Copleston, John, Esquire, of Copplestone
- Cotton, Edward, D.D
- Courtenay, William (1342–1396), Lord Archbishop of Canterbury
- Courtenay, Sir Peter (1346–1405), Knight
- Courtenay, Richard (d.1415), Lord Bishop of Norwich
- Courtenay, Peter (d.1492), Lord Bishop of Winchester
- Courtenay, Lord Edward, Earl of Devon (1527–1556)
- Cowell, John, Doctor
- De Crediton, Frederick, Bishop of Utrecht
- Crocker, Sir John, Knight
- Cruwys, Sir Robert, Knight
- Cutcliffe, John
- Davie, Edmund, M.D
- Da Vies, Captain John
- Davils, Captain Henry
- Dennis, Sir Thomas
- Devon, Richard
- Devonius, alias de Forda, Johannes, Chaplain to King John
- Dynham, John, 1st Baron Dynham (c. 1433–1501)
- Dodderidge, Sir John, Knight (1555–1628)
- Downe, John, B.D
- Drake, Sir Francis (1540–1596), Knight
- Drake, Sir Bernard (1537–1586), Knight
- Drake, Robert
- Drew, Edward, Serjeant at Law
- Duck, Nicholas
- Eadulph, Bishop of Devon
- Edgecombe, Sir Richard, Knight
- Edmonds, Sir Thomas, Knight
- Exeter, Walter
- Exeter, William, D.D
- Fishacre, Richard
- Fitz, John, Bencher of Lincoln's-Inn
- FitzRalph, Saint Richard, Archbishop of Armagh
- Flay, Thomas, Alderman of the City of Exeter
- Floier, William, Esquire
- Foliot, Gilbert (1110–1187), Lord Bishop of London
- Ford, Sir Henry, Knight
- Fortescue, Sir John (1394–1480), Knight
- Fulford, Sir William, Knight
- Gale, Theophilus
- Gandy, John, D.D
- Garland, John
- Gates, Sir Thomas, Knight
- Gee, John
- Gervais, Walter
- Giffard, Colonel John (1602-1665), of Brightley
- Gilbert, Sir Humphry, Knight
- Giles, Sir Edward, Knight
- Glanvil, Sir John
- Glanvil, Sir John, Knight
- Glanvil, Joseph
- Gould, James, Merchant
- Greenway, John
- Grenvil, Sir Theobald, Knight
- Hakewil, William, Esquire
- Halse, John, Lord Bishop of Coventry and Lichfield
- Hankford, Sir William, K.B
- Harding, Thomas, D.D
- Harris, John, Serjeant at Law
- Hawkins, Sir John, Knight
- Hawley, John
- Haydon, John, Bencher of Lincoln's-Inn
- Heale, Sir John, Serjeant at Law
- Herle, Sir William, Knight
- Hill, Sir John, Knight (died 1408)
- Hody, Sir John, Knight
- Holland, Lord John, Duke of Exeter
- Hooker, alias Vowel, John
- Hooker, Richard, Master of the Temple
- Hopkins, Ezekiel (d.1690), Lord Bishop of Derry
- Huddesfeild, Sir William, Knight
- Iscanus, Bartholomew (d.1184), Lord Bishop of Exeter
- Jewel, John (1522–1571), Lord Bishop of Salisbury
- Karswill, Sir William, Knight
- Kebie, surnamed Corinius
- Kempthorn, Sir John, Knight
- Kirkham, Sir John, Knight
- Langton, Stephen (1150–1228), Archbishop of Canterbury
- Leofricus (d.1072), Lord Chancellour of England
- Lethbridge, Christopher (d.1670), Mayor of Exeter in 1660.
- Livingus (d.1046), Bishop of Devon
- Lyde, George
- Martin, William, Recorder of the City of Exon
- Mayne, Jasper, D.D. Archdeacon of Chichester
- Molle (?) John
- Monk, George, Duke of Albemarle (1608–1670)
- Moreman, John, D.D. Dean of Exeter
- Morice, Sir William, Knight
- Morwen, or Moorin, John, B.D
- Newte, Richard, Rector of Tiverton
- Orgar, Duke of Devonshire
- Oxenham, John, Captain
- Peryam, Sir William (1534–1604), Knight
- Petre, Sir William, Knight
- Pole, Sir William (1561–1635), Knight
- Pollard, Sir Lewis (c.1465-1526), Justice of the Common Pleas
- Pomerai, Sir Henry, Lord of Biry
- Prideaux, Sir Edmond, Baronet
- Prideaux, John, D.D. Lord Bishop of Worcester
- Ralegh, William (d.1250), Lord Bishop of Winchester
- Ralegh, Sir Walter (1554–1618)
- Rainolds, John, D.D
- Reynell, Richard, Esquire
- Ridgeway, Sir Thomas, Knight and Baronet
- Risdon, Thomas, Bencher of the Inner Temple
- Denys Rolle (1614–1638)
- Row, John, Serjeant at Law
- Slanning, Sir Nicholas, Knight
- Southcot, John, Justice of King's Bench
- Stanberry, or Stambery (d.1474), Bishop of Hereford
- Stapledon, Walter (1261–1326), Lord Bishop of Exeter
- Stowford, Sir John, Lord Chief Baron of Exchequer
- Strode, William, D.D
- Tooker, alias Tucker, William, D.D.
- Tozar, Henry, B.D
- Tremain, Thomas, Esquire
- Upton, Nicholas, L.C.D
- Wadham, Sir John, Knight (of Merryfield, Ilton, Somerset and Edge, Branscombe, Devon)
- Westcot, John
- Whyddon, Sir John, Knight, Justice of King's Bench
- St. Winifred, Archbishop of Ments
- Woollcombe, Robert
- Yard, Richard
- Yoo, or Yeo, William
