= Brightley, Chittlehampton =

Estate within the parish and former manor of Chittlehampton in the county of Devon

Coordinates: 50.987°N 3.978°W

Brightley
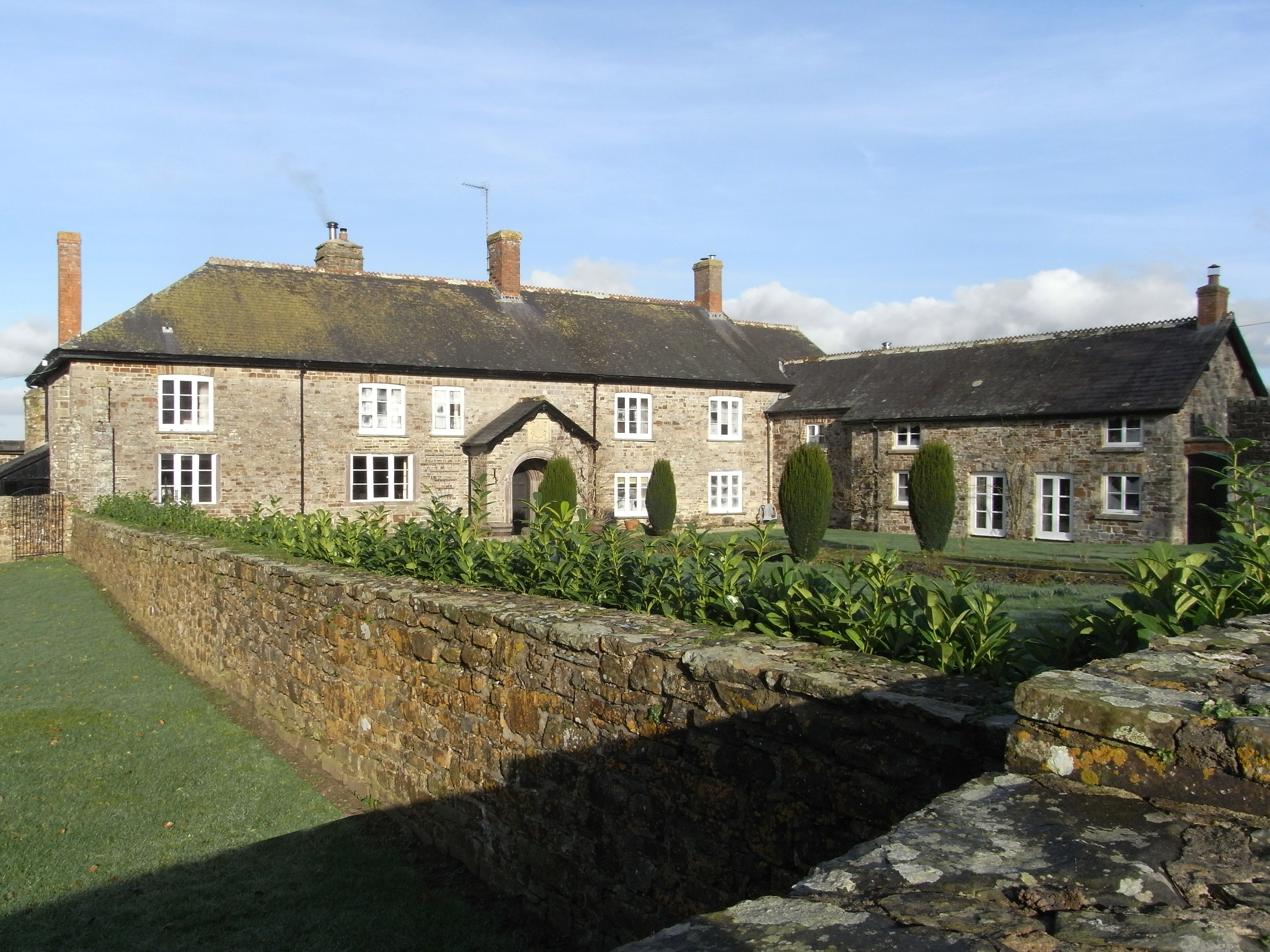
- Brightley Barton, the seat of the principal secondary manor within the parish of Chittlehampton. The 17th-century house was substantially larger than the present building
- Interactive map of Brightley
- Location: Chittlehampton, Devon, England

History
- Built: 15th century

Brightley was historically the principal secondary estate within the parish and former manor of Chittlehampton in the county of Devon, England, situated about 2 1/4 miles south-west of the church and on a hillside above the River Taw. From the early 16th century to 1715 it was the seat of the Giffard family, whose mansion house occupied the moated site immediately to the west of the present large farmhouse known as Brightley Barton, a Grade II listed building which incorporates some elements of the earlier house. It is not to be confused with the 12th-century Brightley Priory near Okehampton. (Note: An error made by the Devon historian Tristram Risdon in his 1630 work "A Survey of Devon" in his account of the parish of Chittlehampton.)

== History ==
Brightley was the seat of a junior line of the prominent gentry family of Giffard of Halsbury in the parish of Parkham. The present house, named Brightley Barton which has long served as a large farmhouse, retains only one room of the former much larger mansion of the Giffards, but the mediaeval retaining walls of the former moat survive, which is a great rarity in North Devon. A 17th-century stone sculpted heraldic escutcheon showing the Giffard arms is built into the stonework above the porch, said by Pevsner to date from the 15th century. During the Civil War it served as quarters for 300 Royalist troops, at which time it was owned by Col. John Giffard (1602–1665). These troops are said to have crossed the River Taw over the weir.

The estate of Brightley was sold in the 1950s by Lord Clinton, heir of the Rolle family of Stevenstone, to its tenant Mr John Thomas, whose family had been tenants of Lord Clinton across the River Taw at Bartridge, in Atherington parish, and were invited by Lord Clinton during the agricultural depression of the 1930s to also take the lease of Brightley.

== Descent of the estate ==
=== FitzWarin ===
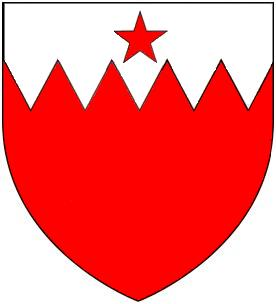
Arms of FitzWarren of Brightley, Chittlehampton: Gules, on a chief indented argent a mullet of the first. (Note: The mullet appears to be a mark of cadency denoting descent of this branch of the family from a third son. These arms are shown quartered on the Giffard monuments in Chittlehampton Church and on the 17th-century escutcheon above the porch of Brightley Barton)

The family of FitzWarin (alias FitzWarren) appears to be the earliest recorded holder of the manor of Brightley, in the 12th century. The family was a branch of the FitzWarin family, powerful Welsh Marcher Lords of Whittington Castle, Shropshire and of Alveston, Gloucestershire, which shares very similar arms. The Devon historian Tristram Risdon (died 1640) stated that Brightley became the residence of William Filius Warini (i.e. Latin for "son of Warin", French fils de contracted to fitz) in the reign of King Richard I (1189–1199), and stated him to be the son of "Fulk FitzWarren", who had inherited it from his father in the time of King Henry II (1154–1189). A similar account is given by Risdon's contemporary Sir William Pole (died 1635) who stated: "William, sonne of Fulk Fitzwarren, receyved this land from his father in Kinge Henry 2 tyme" (i.e. between 1154 and 1189). The family then took the surname "de Brightley" and adopted a simplified, differenced version of the FitzWarin paternal arms, and several of that family named William succeeded one another for several generations at Brightley. One William de Brightley was Knight of the Shire in 1365. The senior line of FitzWarin became Barons FitzWarin in 1295 and were also from 1382 (Note: Following the death of John Cogan (died 1382), feudal baron of Bampton, whose sister and heiress was Elizabeth Cogan (1374–1397), wife of Fulk FitzWarin, 5th Baron FitzWarin (1362–1391)) feudal barons of Bampton, Devon and from 1391 co-heirs to the lands of the feudal barony of Barnstaple, Devon. (Note: Following the death of Nicholas Audley (c. 1328 – 1391), feudal baron of Barnstaple, one of whose sisters and co-heiresses was Margaret Audley, wife of Fulk FitzWarin, 4th Baron FitzWarin (1341–1374)) The title Baron FitzWarin and the feudal barony of Bampton and their share of the feudal barony of Barnstaple passed in the 15th century to their descendants the Bourchier family which made its principal residence at Tawstock in Devon, ancient seat of the barons of Barnstaple, (Note: Pole, p.14, mis-transcribed as "Tavistoke", see note on difficulties of transcribing Pole's manuscript, p. xv) about 6 miles north-west of Brightley. The Bourchiers were created Earls of Bath in 1536, and were highly influential in Devon. According to Risdon, Brightley passed from the de Brightley family via the family of Carew to the family of Coblegh.

=== Coblegh ===
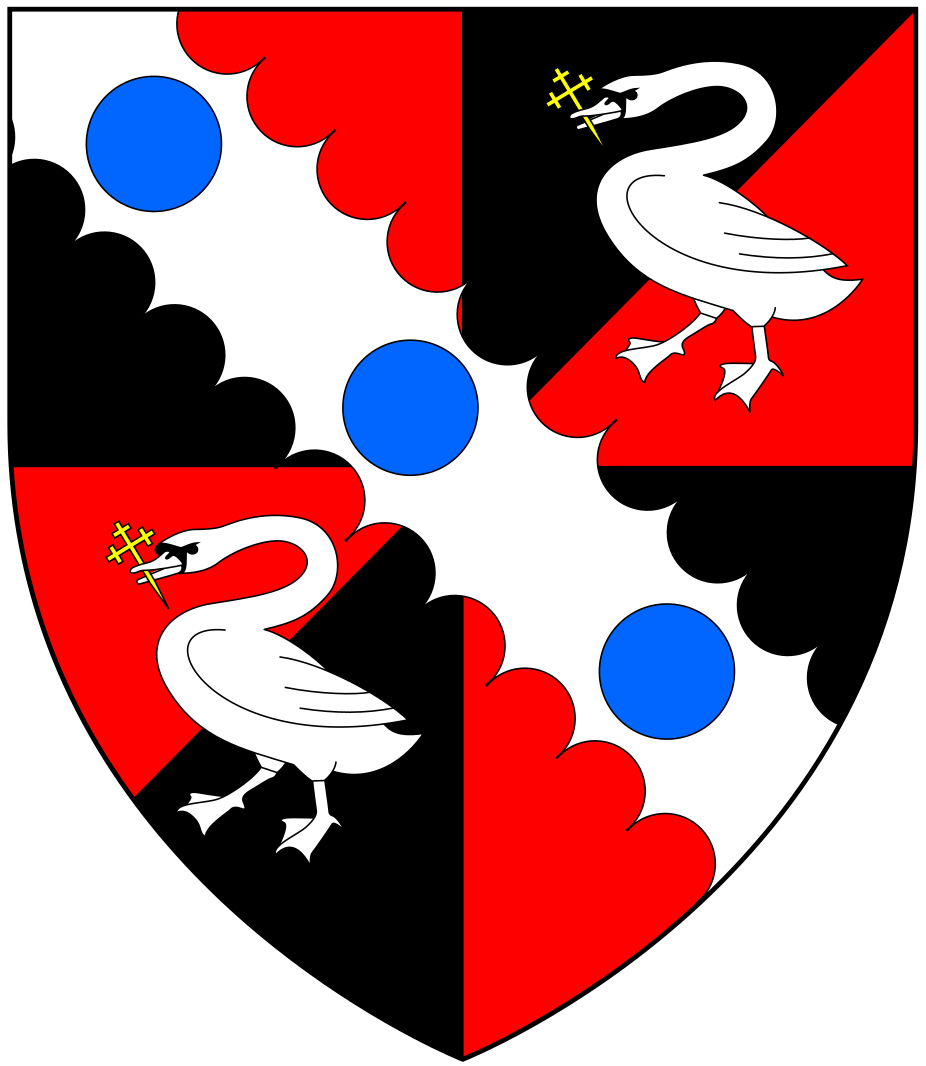
Canting arms of Coblegh family of Brightley: Gyronny of eight gules and sable, between two cobs argent on a bend engrailed of the last three hurts. (Note: The cobs (i.e. male swans) are shown each with a cross fitchy in its beak on the mural monument to Roger Giffard (died 1603) of Tiverton Castle in the chancel of Tiverton Church.)

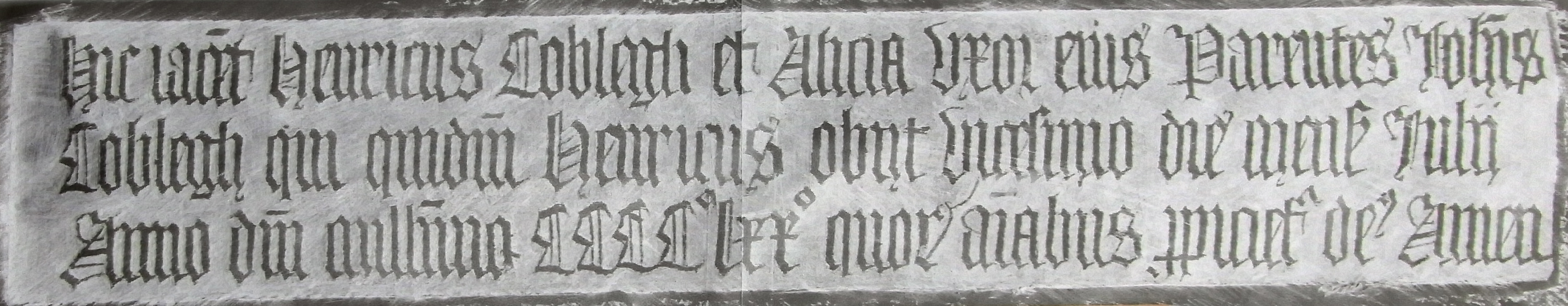
Monumental brass of Henry Coblegh (died 1470), Chittlehampton Church

The Cobley family of Brightley was the leading family resident within the manor and parish of Chittlehampton, but were not lords of the manor of Chittlehampton. Two monumental brasses commemorating the Cobley family are set into two stone slabs measuring 65" × 25" set into the floor of the parish church immediately below and to the west of the pulpit. The more southerly one comprises a brass plaque only, measuring 17 1/4" × 3" (44 × 8 cm). (Note: Inscribed with the following Latin text in gothic lettering: Hic jacet Henricus Coblegh et Alicia uxor eius parentes Joh(ann)is Coblegh qui quid(a)m Henricus obiit vice(n)simo die mens(is) Julii Anno d(o)m(ini) mill(ens)imo cccc.o (quadringentensimo) lxx.o (septuagensimo) quor(um) a(n)i(m)abus pr(opiti)et(ur) de(us) Amen (Here lie Henry Coblegh and Alice his wife the parents of John Coblegh which certain Henry died on the twentieth day of the month of July in the one thousandth four hundredth and seventieth year of Our Lord on the souls of whom may God look with favour))

The son of Henry Coblegh (died 1470) by his wife Alice was John Coblegh whose monumental brass lies adjacent to the north. John married twice, firstly to Isabella Cornu, secondly to Joan Pyne (possibly of the Pyne family of East Down), as his brass records. John Coblegh is recorded in the Lisle Letters as one of the Devonshire notables who were given a deer by Honor Plantagenet, Viscountess Lisle (died 1566) from the park of her nearby manor of Umberleigh. He also features further in the Letters. There exists in Chittlehampton church a slab monument of John Coblegh (died 1542) and his wife Joan Fortescue. Their only child and sole heiress was Margaret Coblegh who married Sir Roger Giffard (died 1547), thus Brightley, together with other estates including Tapeley in the parish of Westleigh, passed to the Giffard family.

=== Giffard ===
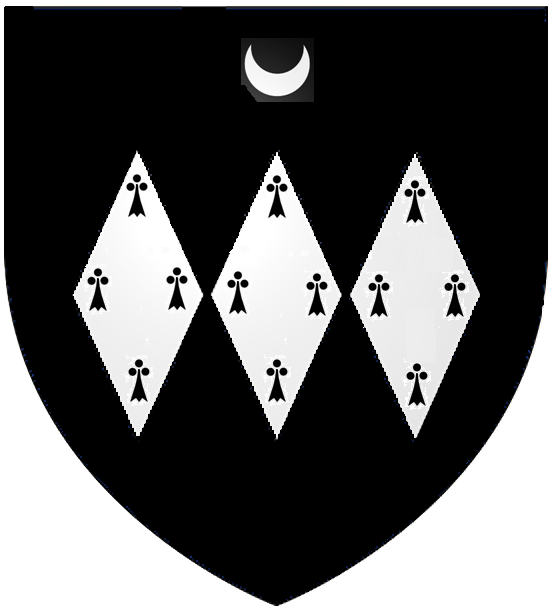
Arms of Giffard: Sable, three fusils conjoined in fesse ermine for difference a crescent in chief argent. (Note: The crescent denotes that the family seated at Brightley descended from a second son of an ancient Giffard patriarch.)

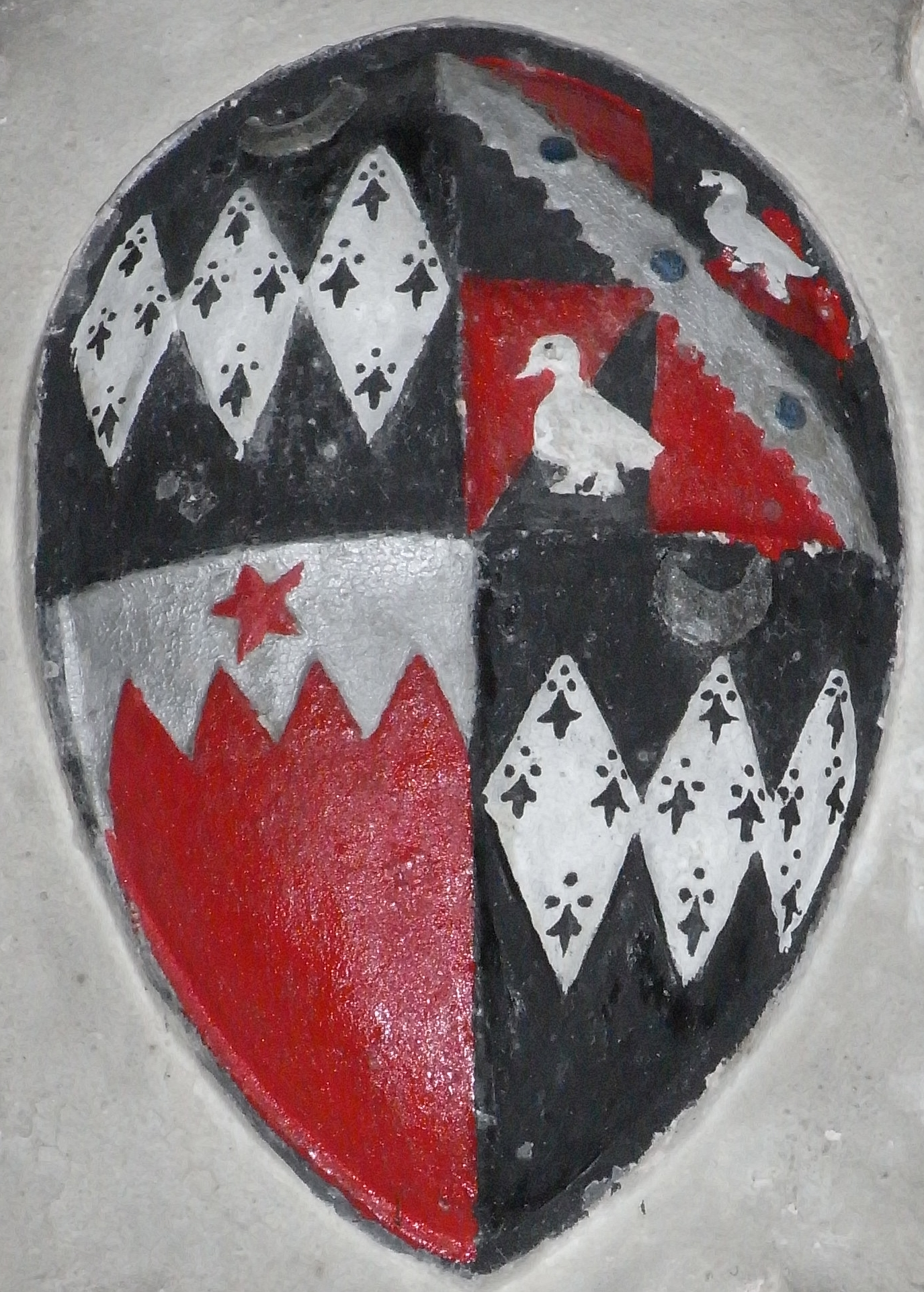
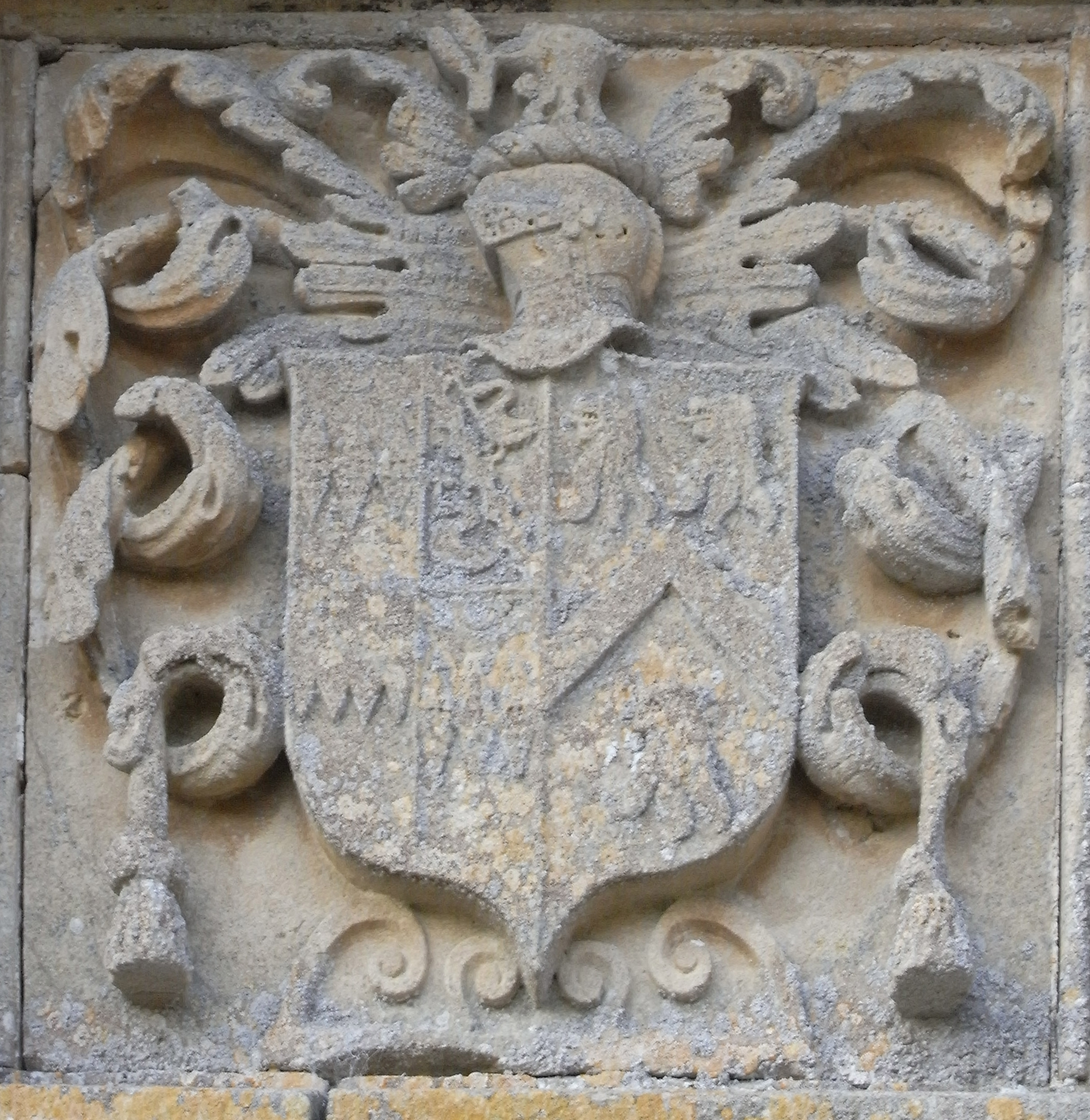
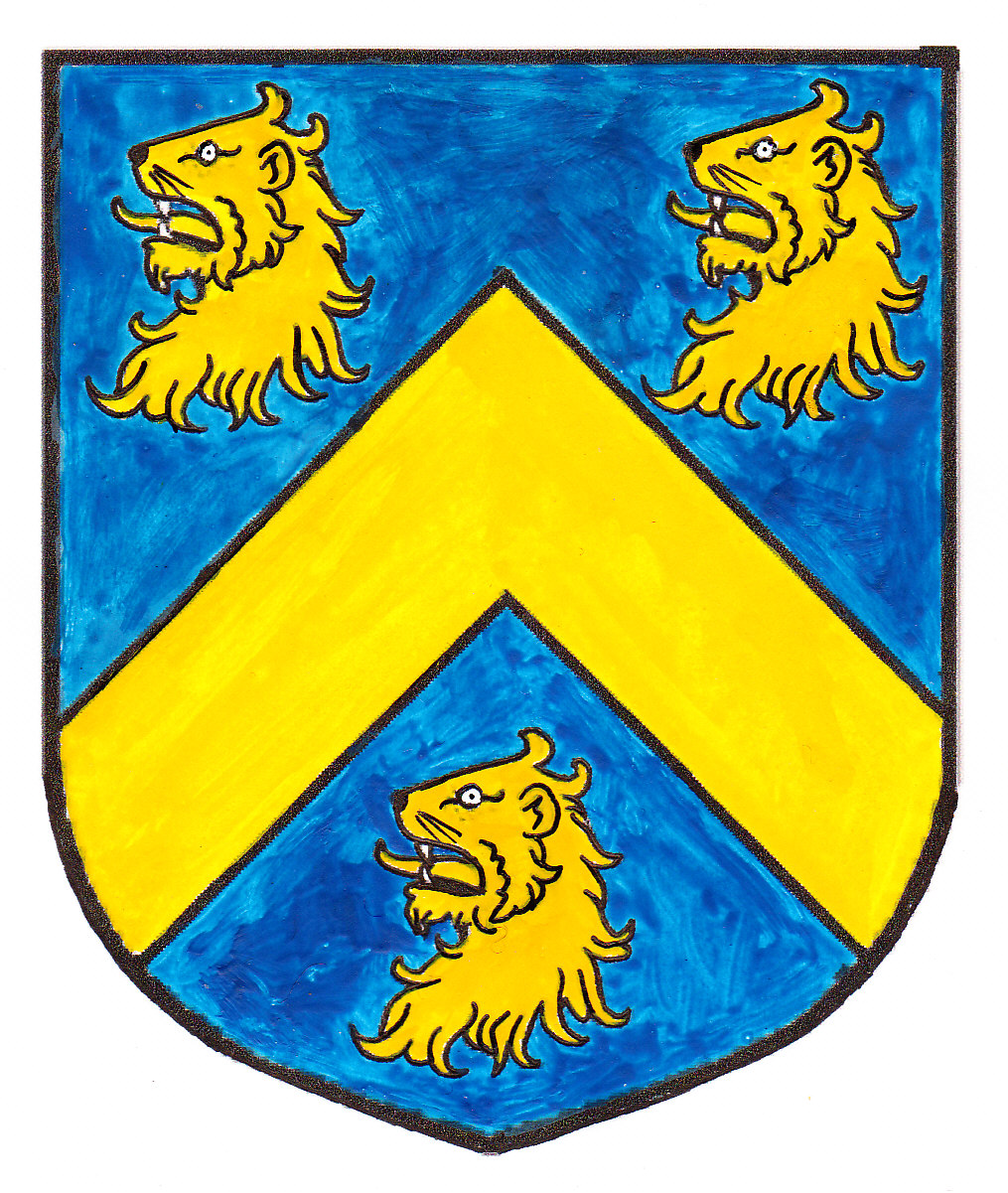
Sculpted stone heraldic escutcheon above porch, Brightley Barton, Chittlehampton, erected by Col. John Giffard (1602–1665), after 1622 when he inherited the property from his grandfather, showing the arms of Giffard impaling Wyndham, the family of his wife Joan: Baron: Quarterly 1st & 4th, Giffard 2nd Coblegh 3rd Gules, on a chief indented argent a mullet of the first (FitzWarren); Feme: Azure, a chevron between three lion's heads erased or (Wyndham). Atop the helm is the crest of Giffard: A cock's head erased in its beak an ear of wheat. (Note: This crest may be seen more clearly on the mural monument to Roger Giffard (died 1603) of Tiverton Castle, (fifth son of Sir Roger Giffard by Margaret Coblegh) in the chancel of Tiverton Church, with the motto Pul Que Fort, ("A Cock and Strong"))

The pedigree of Giffard (pronounced Jiffard) is given as follows in the Heraldic Visitations of Devon:

==== Sir Roger Giffard (died 1547) ====
Sir Roger Giffard (died 1547) was a younger son of the Giffard family of Halsbury in the parish of Parkham, 4 miles south-west of Bideford. He was the third son of Thomas Giffard (1532/3) of Halsbury, but the eldest by his second wife Anne Coryton, daughter of John Coryton of Newton Ferrers in the parish of St Mellion, in Cornwall. Several monuments exist to the Coryton family in the Church of St Melanus, St Mellion. Thomas's eldest son by his first marriage was heir to Halsbury and the senior line of the family remained seated there until the death of John Giffard of Halsbury (died after 1666), the last in the male line, who bequeathed the estate on Roger Giffard (1646–1724) a younger son of the junior Brightley line. Sir Roger Giffard had 14 children by his wife Margaret Coblegh, including:

- John Giffard (died 1585), eldest son and heir (see below).
- Hugh Giffard, third son, married Johanna (or Joane) Bampfield, widow of Sir Richard Pollard of Way, St Giles in the Wood and a sister of Richard Bampfield (1526–1594) of Poltimore, Sheriff of Devon in 1576, whose monument exists in St Mary's Church, Poltimore.
- Roger Giffard (1533–1603), fourth son, who purchased Tiverton Castle after the death without children of Edward Courtenay, 1st Earl of Devon (died 1556). His mural monument exists to the north of the high altar in St Peter's Church, Tiverton, next to the castle. On the death without male children of his grandson Roger Giffard (b.1605), of Tiverton, the property passed to Robert Burgoyne, the husband of his only daughter Joan Giffard.
- Jane Giffard (died 1596), the wife of Amias Chichester (1527–1577), founder of the family of Chichester of Arlington, a junior line of the prominent Chichester family of Raleigh, Pilton.
- Wilmot Giffard, wife of Lewis Fortescue (died 1595), younger brother of Richard Fortescue (c. 1517 – 1570), MP, of Filleigh.
- Mary Giffard (died 1598), wife of John Wykes (c. 1520 – 1591), of North Wyke in the parish of South Tawton, Devon, whose effigy exists in the Wyke Chapel in St Andrew's Church, South Tawton. He is known locally as "Warrior Wykes", and commanded a horse regiment as indicated by the spurs on his effigy. He fought at Havre de Grace and was wounded. He built much of the surviving mansion house of North Wyke, including its chapel, on the corbel of the upper eastern window of which are sculpted the arms of Wykes (three Danish battle-axes) and Giffard.

==== John Giffard (died 1585) ====
John Giffard (died 1585), son and heir of Sir Roger Giffard (died 1547), married Mary Grenville, daughter of Sir Richard Grenville (c. 1495 – 1550), lord of the manors of Stowe, Kilkhampton in Cornwall and Bideford, Devon, MP for Cornwall in 1529. Mary was the sister of Roger Grenville, believed to have been the captain of the Mary Rose in the sinking of which at Portsmouth he drowned in 1545, and was thus aunt of his son the heroic sea captain Sir Richard Grenville (1542–1591) of the Revenge. She survived her husband and remarried Arthur Tremayne of Collacombe. His eldest son and heir was John Giffard (died 1622).

==== John Giffard (died 1622) ====
John Giffard (died 1622), son and heir of John Giffard (died 1585), married Honor Erle (1555-1638), a daughter of the courtier Sir Walter Erle (c.1520-1581) of Colcombe in the parish of Colyton, of Bindon in the parish of Axmouth, both in Devon, and of Charborough in Dorset. His eldest son Arthur Giffard (1580–1616) predeceased his father having married Agnes Leigh (died 1625), (Note: Called Agnes by the biographer John Prince, who was a friend of one of her sons, but called Anne in the Heralds' Visitations, p.400) daughter of Thomas Leigh Esq., of Burrough (anciently "Borow", "Borough", etc.) in the parish of Northam, near Bideford. Arthur left a son and heir to his grandfather, Col. John Giffard (1602–1665), and eight other children including his second son Rev. Arthur Giffard (1605–1666), appointed in 1643 Rector of Bideford by his cousin Sir John Granville (1628–1701) (created Earl of Bath in 1661), but forcefully ejected by the Parliamentarians during the Civil War. The Devon biographer Rev. John Prince (1643–1723) served under him at Bideford as a young curate and thus had personal knowledge of the family and included his brother Col. John Giffard (died 1665) as one of his Worthies of Devon.

==== Col. John Giffard (1602–1665) ====
Col. John Giffard (1602–1665), grandson of John Giffard (died 1622), was a Colonel of Royalist forces in the Civil War, who married in 1621 Joan Wyndham, daughter of Sir John Wyndham (1558–1645) of Orchard Wyndham, near Williton, Somerset. He had a daughter Grace, whose effigy exists in Chittlehampton Church, and at least two sons, John Giffard (1639–1712), his heir, and Roger Giffard (1644–1724).

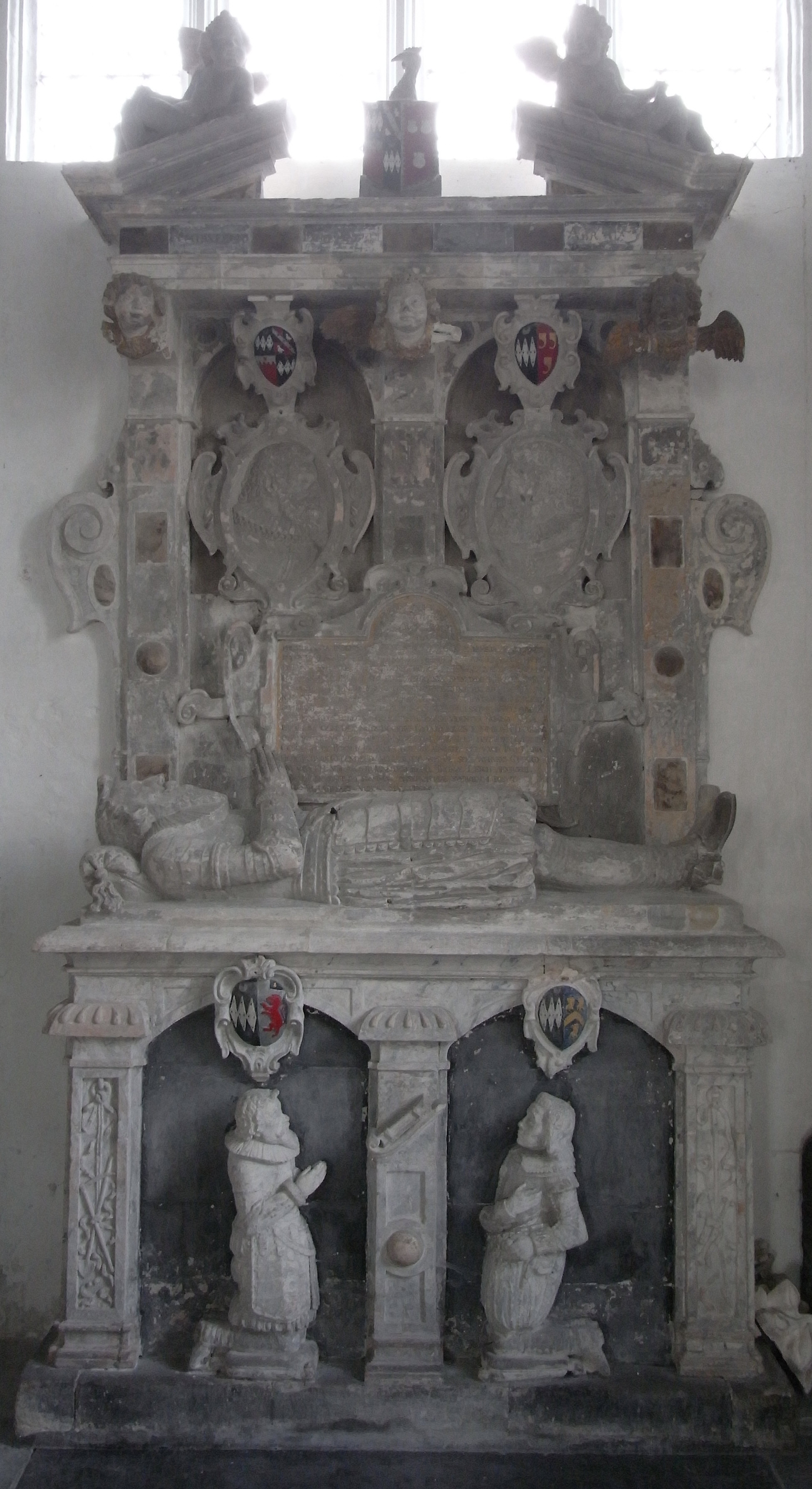
The Giffard Monument, 1625. North wall of north transept

==== John Giffard (1639–1712) ====
John Giffard (1639–1712), son and heir of Col. John Giffard (1602–1665), married twice:

- Firstly to Susannah Bampfylde, of North Molton. Their son John Giffard (died 1704) married Margaret Clotworthy, daughter of Roger Clotworthy of Rashleigh. This marriage produced only a daughter Margaret (died 1743), who married John Courtenay (died 1732), the last in the male line of Courtenay of Molland. The arms of Giffard are shown on the mural monument to John Courtenay in Molland Church as an escutcheon of pretence within the Courtenay arms, denoting her status as an heraldic heiress.
- Secondly to Frances Fane, by whom he had at least two sons, Henry Giffard (1675–1709) an officer in the Royal Navy, who married Martha Hill, daughter of Edward Hill, Judge of the Admiralty and Treasurer of Virginia. His brother and John Giffard's 4th son was his heir Caesar Giffard (died 1715) who married Mary Melhuish. They had a daughter Rachel Giffard who married Thomas Colley (died 1762). The executors of the will of Caesar Giffard sold the manor of Chittlehampton in 1737 to Samuel Rolle of Hudscott, within the parish of Chittlehampton. The property comprised 1,300 acres and was sold for £9,550.

==== Giffard Monument (1625) ====
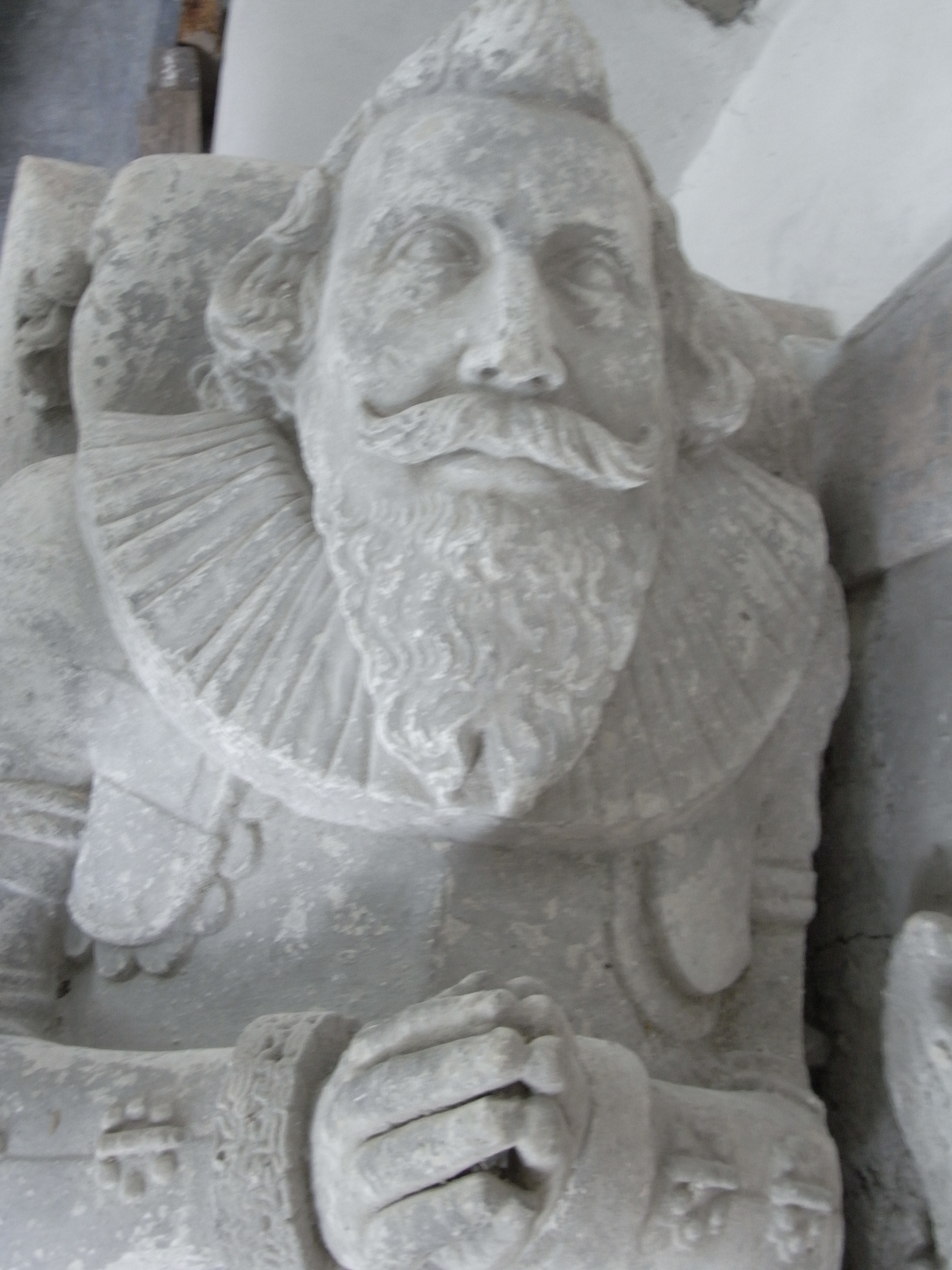
Recumbent effigy of John Giffard (died 1622) of Brightley

This monument situated against the north wall of the north transept serves as a memorial to five generations of the Giffard family of Brightley, the principal manor within the parish of Chittlehampton. It was erected in 1625 by John Giffard (1602–1665), then a young man, shown kneeling at the bottom right, ostensibly as a monument to his grandfather John Giffard (died 1622), whose heir he was and who is represented by the main recumbent effigy. The young John's father Arthur Giffard (died 1616), who died during his own father's lifetime and thus never inherited Brightley, is shown kneeling opposite his son at the bottom left, praying before a book placed on a prie dieu. Two renaissance-style stone medallions showing faces in profile sculpted in relief are positioned above the recumbent effigy and, as is indicated by the heraldry, represent on the left Sir Roger Giffard (died 1547) who married Margaret Cobleigh, heiress of Brightley, and on the right his son John Giffard (1524-1623), who by his wife Mary Grenville, was the father of John Giffard (died 1622), the recumbent effigy below him. On a panel directly above the recumbent effigy is an inscription in Latin, translated into English thus:

"Here lies John Giffard, Esquire, a man of outstanding piety, probity, prudence and providence, who from Honor his wife, from the family of Erle, received a most plentiful progeny. However with Arthur his firstborn having died with his father still living, he substituted for him as his heir John the son of Arthur. Thus with his family splendidly and successfully settled, with his sons and with the sons of his sons sufficiently provided for and with John his heir having been allied in marriage to the most select Joan from the illustrious stock of Wyndham of Somerset, already a seventy-year-old, he departed from the living. With his urn having been touched (2 Kings 13:21), those famous names once upon a time dead seemed as if to have risen up again: Roger Giffard, knight, sprung from the family of Halsbury, who had as his wife Margaret the daughter and heiress of John Cobleigh of Brightley; John Giffard, esquire, whom Mary was the wife (of), the daughter of Richard Grenville, knight; and of the greatest hope Arthur Giffard who received for his wife Agnes, the daughter of Thomas Leigh, esquire. John Giffard, his most sorrowful grandson, placed here this monument, a symbol of most pious observance".

Atop in Latin are the words translated as "The angels carried him into Abraham's bosom".
