= Ernle =

English gentry or landed family

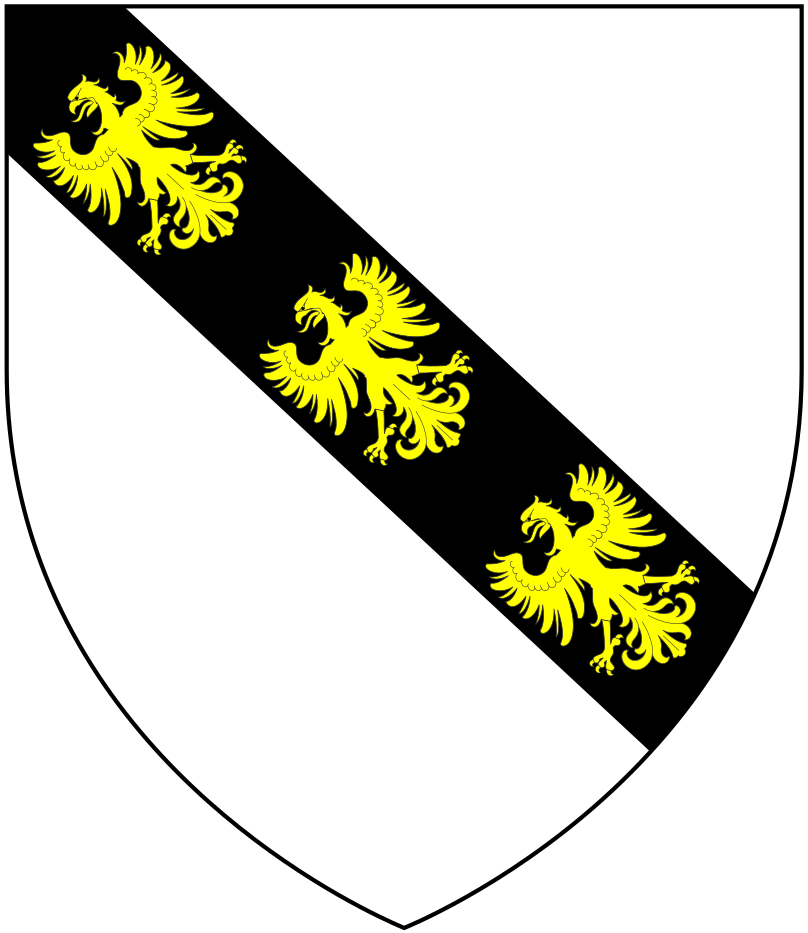
Arms of Ernle: Argent, on a bend sable three eagles displayed or

The Ernle family was an English gentry or landed family descended from the lords of the manor of Earnley in Sussex who derived their surname from the name of the place where their estates lay.

== Origins ==
=== Onomastic ===
Onomasticians say that the surname's origin, in being drawn from the name of a manor, is topographical in nature, and identical with the place name's origins. As such, it is derived from an Old English compound name composed of earn meaning eagle combined with leah meaning wood. The name's meaning is interpreted as signifying a place to which eagles resort.

The earliest forms noted are Earneleach, Earnaleagh, Earnelegh found in a document dated 780 during the reign of Oslac, duke of the South Saxons. A later form, Earneleia, derives from a charter of England's King Aethelstan dated 930. Other English place names deriving from the same two words are thought to include Earley, Berkshire and Areley Kings (otherwise Areley-on-Severn), formerly called Ernley, Worcestershire. The latter place is connected with Layamon, poet and historian, one of the earliest writers in the English tongue (The Beginnings of English Literature, C.M. Lewis, 1900, p. 66):

About the year 1205 an English 'Brut' was written. This was the work of Layamon, a parish priest of Ernley in Worcestershire. The opening lines give us the best information we have about him. Their metre should be noted. It is a relic of the Old English verse, each half-line (or each line, as here printed) containing two principal accents, and being more or less closely connected with its fellow. The poet, however, often omitted the alliteration; and the scribe, who attempted by marks of punctuation to show which half-lines belonged together, seems in consequence to have sometimes lost his way.

An preost wes on leoden Laȝamon wes ihoten. He wes leouenaðes sone, liðe him beo drihten. He wonede at ernleȝe, at æðelen are chirechen. vppen seuarne staÞe, sel Þar him Þuhte. on fest Radestone Þer he bock radde. Hit com him on mode, & on his mern Þonke.

[translation into Modern English]

A priest was among the people who was called Layamon. He was Levenath's son. Gracious to him be the Lord. He dwelt at Ernly, at a noble church upon Severn's bank. Well there to him it seemed, fast by Radestone. There he read books.

=== Geographical: Parochial versus manorial extent ===
The parish of Earnley lies on the southern coast of England in the county of Sussex, 4 miles (6.4 km) south-west of Chichester, the local cathedral city.

It formed part of the hundred of La Manwode or Manwood, now found under the form Manhood, which in turn took its name from a locality in the parish of Earnley. The parish and hundred lie in the original pre-Conquest Saxon division of Sussex known as the Rape of Chichester. The boundaries of the manor of Earnley and the parish of the same name are not strictly coterminous, as the manor itself was not contained within the parish borders, but included part of the neighbouring parish of West Wittering. Also, the parish of Earnley was enlarged in 1524, absorbing the former parish of Almodington, now a hamlet of Earnley parish. The resulting parish, held by a rector, is formally referred to as Earnley with Almodington.

During the Civil War and Interregnum, the parish of Earnley was united with East Wittering for the purposes of officially countenanced Presbyterian worship and oversight during the official suppression of Anglicanism. At the Restoration, which saw not just the return of the monarchy, but also of the Anglican Settlement, the parishes reverted to their separate status as in pre-Commonwealth times.

=== Historical ===
Historians trace the origins of this Sussex landed family to the latter part of the twelfth century. About 1190, Bertha de Lancinges confirmed an earlier charter for lands amounting to a quarter of a knight's fee less one virgate at Earnley, Sussex granted about a generation earlier, that is, circa 1166, by her father William de Lancinges and his wife Maud to his uncle, Lucas de Ernle. This name simply means Luke of Earnley. This man, whom historians call Luke de Ernle, is the first known member of the family, and is the probable progenitor of all subsequent Ernles, though it is not known whether he was actually the first person to be known by this designation.

Since he is denominated as de Ernle in this document, it is quite likely that he or his family was already known and distinguished from others by the use of that sobriquet or surname. Since the grant of lands was given to him by a family member, it appears logical to assume that his own connexion to the place, like theirs, dated to an earlier period.

As for the de Lancinges family itself, to whom Luke de Ernle was kin: they were supporters of the Arundel earls of Sussex who were descended from Roger de Montgomerie, 1st Earl of Shrewsbury, a major feudal baron who was granted large tracts of Sussex known as the Rape of Arundel in 1067 or 1068 from his kinsman, William I of England.

=== Ethnic ===
It is not now known whether Luke de Ernle was of Norman, Saxon, or other, origin, these events having occurred a century after the Norman conquest of England in 1066. The designation de Ernle occurs very early in the history of the adoption of hereditary surnames in England, a phenomenon which began along the south-eastern coast of England among the feudal manorial lords (of the greater and lesser nobility) whose members were mostly drawn from the descendants of the Norman invaders and their allies.

=== Heraldic ===
The ancient coat of arms or heraldic shield of the Ernle family was not used pursuant to specific rights described in an extant grant of arms from one of the royal officers of arms, but appears to have been borne by the head of the family through prescriptive right having been adopted in time immemorial. The contents of the shield reflect a knowledge of the name's original meaning, resort of eagles, that is, a place where eagles congregate. As such, the coat could be said to fall into the category of canting arms. The blazon is

Argent, on a bend sable, three eagles displayed or

which means that on a heater shield coloured silver appears a wide sash-like strip of black running diagonally from the top left toward the bottom right of the escutcheon on which is placed a row of three golden eagles with their wings open and bodies showing.

According to Burke's General Armory (1884) and Burke's General Armory Two (1974), this basic coat of arms, sometimes varying in one detail or another, accompanied by various crests or none, was used over the centuries by the branches of the family, who, by the similarity of their descriptions, claim descent from a shared origin in the same Sussex locality, Earnley, from which they derive their surname.

These armigerous branches of the family, whose current fate is not always known, with their various differences or departures from the original paternal coat, taken as denoting cadency, were in alphabetical order:

(From Burke's General Armory, 1884, p. 312, col. 2)

1. Earnley (co. Cornwall). Argent, on a bend cotised sable, two (another, three) eagles displayed with two necks or.

2. Earnley (co. Kent). Argent, a bend sable cotised between three eagles displayed gules.

3. Earnley (co. Sussex). Argent, on a bend sable, three eagles displayed or. Crest: A savage's head affrontée, couped at the shoulders, wreathed about the temples, issuing therefrom a plume of three ostrich feathers all proper.

(From Burke's General Armory, 1884, p. 328, col. 2)

4. Erneley (place unspecified). Argent, on a bend sable, three eagles displayed of the field.

5. Ernelle (co. Kent). Argent, on a bend cotised sable, three eagles displayed or. Crest: A chevalier on horseback wielding a scimitar, all proper.

6. Ernelle (place unspecified). Argent, a bend sable.

7. Ernle (Ernle [i.e. Earnley], co. Sussex, and Whetham, co. Wilts.; descended from RICHARD ERNLE, of Ernle (that is, Earnley, Sussex), temp. Hen. III, the ancestor of Sir John ERNLE, Knt., of Ernle, Chief Justice, K.B., whose descendant*, Sir John Ernle, Knt., of Whetham, co. Wilts., was Chancellor of the Exchequer and a Privy Councillor, temp. Charles II and James II. The family name, EARNLEY, or ERNLE, is derived from a village in Sussex, so called from the Saxon words Earn and Lege, the place or habitation of eagles, and, in allusion, the eagles are borne in the arms). Argent, on a bend sable, three eagles displayed or. Crest -- An eagle displayed vert.. Another crest -- A man's head sidefaced, couped at the shoulders proper, on the head a long cap, barry of six or and sable, at the end two strings and tasselled gold.

* This filiation conflicts with what appears in the Oxford Dictionary of National Biography, which points out the confusion of centuries of genealogists over the two Ernle brothers both, according to a common mediaeval usage unfamiliar to many modern researchers, named John. The elder of these brothers was John Ernle, Esq., of Fosbury and Bishop's Cannings, Wilts., esquire. He was the progenitor of the Wiltshire line, and thus the 17th-century chancellor's direct ancestor, while the younger of them, known to history chiefly as Sir John Ernley, was the Lord Chief Justice. This latter personage was, moreover, not as the post-nominal letters K.B. denote, a Knight of the original Order of the Bath, but rather a simple knight, formerly called a banneret, or knight of the field, or what would now be termed a Knight Bachelor, or, in casual usage, a carpet knight.

8. Ernle (Etchilhampton, co. Wilts., baronet, extinct 1787; a branch of ERNLE, of Ernle). Same Arms, &c.

9. Ernley (JOHN ERNLEY, Sheriff of Wilts., temp. Henry VII). Argent, on a bend sable, three eagles displayed or.

10. Ernley (quartered by TIDERLEIGH, of Tiderleigh, co. Devon (modern, Tytherleigh). Robert TIDERLEIGH, of that place, temp. Henry VIII, m. ELIZABETH, dau. and co-heir of ANTHONY ERNLEY. Visitation of Somerset, 1620. Same Arms.

(From General Armory Two, 1974, p. 57, col. 2)

(as per 4 above) Erneley. Insert (Cos. Wilts. And Sussex). V.* W. (which abbreviations refer to the following items: V.=Glover's Ordinary. Cotton MS. Tiberius D. 10; Harleian MSS 1392 and 1459, with the asterisk referring to the note that "Coats incorrectly given in the printed Glover[']s Ordinary which may have been copied into books of reference and probably used as actual coats." W.=Withie's additions to Glover's Ordinary, in Harleian MS 1459)

(as per 5 above) Ernelle (Co. Kent). Add: V.W.

11. Ernell (place unspecified). Argent, on a bend sable, 3 eagles displayed with 2 heads or. W.

(as per 7 above) Ernley (John Ernley). Sheriff of Wilts... Add: Ernley (New Sarum co. Wilts., Baronetcy 1660). Same arms. Sir John Ernley. Chief Justice of Common Pleas. 1509 (recte, 1519, see Dictionary of National Biography). Dug. O.J. (an abbreviation denoting William Dugdale's work, Origines Juridiciales, London, 1671).

While coats of arms are often accompanied by mottoes, heraldists and other interested parties will also to note that, apparently, no motto accompanies any of these coats-of-arms.

=== Status ===
As an armorial family whose original status derives from ancient landed property, the Ernle family belonged to the class known as the gentry. As gentlemen with a coat-of-arms, or armigers, the heads of the family were hereditary esquires, and the younger sons and their cadets all gentlemen, and their daughters all gentlewomen. The family were thus all of gentle birth, and were classed as members of what has been termed the minor or lesser nobility, corresponding to what the Germans term, Uradel, which the French call noblesse de race, or ancient nobility.

Though they never achieved the ranks of the greater nobility which, in England, was confined to members of the peerage, at least one branch of the family did accede to the ranks of hereditary knighthood, created by King James I of England, and known as the baronetage. In the 20th century, a female-line descendant, Rowland Prothero, was granted an hereditary peerage as Lord Ernle, though that title only existed from 1919 to 1937, due to the early death, in action, during World War I, of his only son, who would have been heir to the peerage, had he outlived the hostilities.

As can be seen in the case of the cadet lines of its male descendants, junior members of the family sometimes ceased to live as gentry. In England, as opposed to the Continent, where one observes that the legal penalty for dérogeance resulted in the legal loss of nobiliary status due to the failure of someone of gentle or noble blood to live as a noble, this, however, led to no automatic legal denial of their ancient gentility of blood. So, even if living in reduced circumstances, and performing manual labour, such English gentlefolk did not suffer from any deprivation, withdrawal, or removal of their hereditary gentle status. It is possible, however, that some sank so far from their gentle origins and the former lifestyles of their ancestors that all memory of their family's former rank, privileges, precedence, and armigerous status was lost. On the other hand, while no one could deny their abiding gentle status, they might be subject to popular derision if they asserted it without the means of living up to it by the 'port (i.e. deportment), manner, or reputation' of a gentleman.

By the time this decline began to be observed among the junior-most cadet branches of the family, both the senior male line of the family and their surviving next principal male cadet branch in Wiltshire (see Ernle of Brembridge) had died out (in the late 18th century – in fact, within a year of one another). It is not known if anyone is now entitled to claim a male-line descent from this ancient noble family, and thereby lay claim to use the undifferenced coat-of-arms borne by the head of the Ernle family since time immemorial. The undifferenced arms are, however, quartered in the armorial bearings of the extant Plunkett-Ernle-Erle-Drax family.

== Ernle of Earnley, Sussex, and the Manor of Earnley ==
This family derived from Luke de Ernle who was confirmed in his de Lancinges nephew's earlier grant (1166) to him of almost a quarter of a knight's fee by his de Lancinges great-niece in about 1190.

Historians' attempts to trace this family over later centuries have met with only partial success, though the continuity of the descent of the manor of Earnley among people bearing that early surname is thought to indicate that successive manorial lords all belonged to the same family.

The evidence recited in the published account of the manor of Earnley cites a later lord of the manor living around 1260 whose name was also Luke de Ernle (in this instance, the documentary spelling is de Ernele, and that account favours this spelling of the name). Next, John de Ernle son of Luke held the manor in 1284. A man who may be this John, or his younger son, John, received a grant of free warren at Earnley in 1318.

In 1337, mention is made of John and Richard de Ernele, and of Joan daughter of John de Ernele in connexion with the recovery of the nearby manor of Almodington by Robert de Almodington.

The next two citations from the 1340s probably pertain to one or other of the two men called John de Ernele mentioned in 1337.

According to the Sussex Archaeological Collections (1865, p. 248):

John de Ernele (Ernley), one of the Coroners for Sussex in 1343, being found inefficient, another was ordered to be elected by the County in his place. (Rot. Cl. 17th Edward III.)

A fine dated 1347 names John de Ernele of La Manwode. The place referred to here can be either the name of the hundred in which the parish of Earnley was situate, or an actual locality within the parish of Earnley which happens to have given its name to the hundred, probably because it was the usual meeting-place for the whole hundred when it gathered to conduct business.

Thereafter, almost a century elapses before there is a mention of John Ernle conveying the manor of Earnley to John Michelgrove and his wife, Joan, in 1427. In 1428, 1431 and 1432, however, William Ernele held the manor.

A generation later, in 1467, there is record of the manor being settled on John Lunsford and Margaret his wife, who was the widow of John Ernele. The descent hereafter is paralleled by the account of the family cited in the Oxford Dictionary of National Biography to be found under the heading, Sir John Ernley, Chief Justice.

At this juncture, in her proof of coming of age, Elizabeth Michelgrove, wife of John Shelley (both direct ancestors of the poet, Shelley), it is stated that she was baptised at Earnley parish church on 28 March in the 39th year of the reign of King Henry VI of England, that is, in 1461, and that her godfather was John Ernle, and her godmother, Joan Ernle (see Inq. 15 Ed. VI, no. 66), who were her kinsfolk, as the Dictionary of National Biography, under the entry for her son, Sir William Shelley, asserts.

Elizabeth was the sole child and heir of her father John Michelgrove alias Fauconer, Esq., of Michelgrove, parish of Clapham, Sussex, and his wife, Agnes or Ann, sometimes called Mary, daughter of William Sydney, of Penshurst, Kent. It would appear from her pedigree that the connexion was probably through the parties mentioned in the 1427 manorial transfer, and that there may have been a blood tie between the Michelgrove alias Fauconer family and that of Ernle, in addition to the one of spiritual kinship deriving from the Michelgrove heiress's baptism.

John Ernele, Ernle, or Ernley, Solicitor General, then Attorney General of England and, finally, Chief Justice, is mentioned in 1480 as passing the manor to others of his kinsmen, John Clerkson, the elder, and John Inglere, who were great-grandsons of his own forebear, an earlier John Ernele. This is a curious reference as this particular John Ernley was born in 1464 or 1465, and so was not of age to make a conveyance. Moreover, he had an elder brother, also called John, whom historians refer to as John Ernle, The Elder, Esq., of Fosbury and Bishop's Cannings, Wilts., to distinguish him from his younger brother of the same name. This elder brother John would normally have been the heir to their father, John Ernle, Esq., of Sidlesham, Sussex who died in 1465, unless provisions for some other disposition of these estates was made at some point for which no documentation exists, at least, publicly, at present.

Thereafter, whoever the John Ernle of the 1480 conveyance may have been, the manor passed to people of other names who may or may not be connected by blood or marriage to the Ernle family of Earnley. In 1564, the manor was once again conveyed to Richard Ernle (Erneley in the documentation in this case), indicating that it may, for a time, have been held in trust for the right Ernle heir, and then returned at an appropriate date. At any rate, the connexion between the descent of the manor of Earnley, and the family of the name Ernle, ended finally when a later Richard Erneley sold it to Richard Taylor in 1630. Thereafter, the family of Ernle, as distinct from the manor of the same name, became attached to the episcopal manor of Cackham in West Wittering, a place close to their original home at Earnley in West Sussex.

Despite their proximity to their ancestral lands, the Sussex branch of the Ernle family's close ties with the manor and parish from which they derived their surname, seem, however, to have been severed finally in the first third of the 17th century, after the space of nearly 500 years of continuous manorial tenure.

Evidence of the eclipse of the Sussex branch of the Ernle family by their Wiltshire kinsmen is seen in the lifetime of the immediate heir of the Sussex line's most successful member:

"In Sussex, William Earnley was the son of the Chief Justice of the Common Pleas; in contrast to most of his colleagues, who had at least £40 a year with an average of £100, he had only £26 produced by a medley of very small properties, in addition to which he leased Cakeham manor from the Bishop of Chichester."

One of the latest references to a member of this branch playing a prominent role in the affairs of the county dates from December 1624:

Justices warrant to apoynte a Provost Marshall and to sett Watch & Ward December 1624

After our very harty comendacons : Whereas we have lately receaved Letters from the Lords of his Ma[jesty's] most hon[ourable] Privy Councell directed to us the Justices of Peace of this County; wherein theire Lo[rdships] require for the better secureinge of high wayes and the more safety of places wh.[ich] about this season of the yeare are usually offended by idle and loose p'sons [i.e. persons] and at this tyme is more to be suspected than at other tymes in respect of the great leavyes of Souldiers lately made and to be made who are to be conducted through this County that there should be provost Marshalls stirringe and therefore we have thoughte good to apoynte you

Mr Earnely of Cr. [i.e. Chichester]

to be provost Marshall for the Rape of Cr. [Chichester] & p'sently [i.e. presently] to take uppon you the said office And we have thought it fitt and convenient, that you should make choyse of vj (i.e. six) or viij (i.e. eight) of the substantiallest yeomen to be well armed to attend you at such tymes as yo° [i.e. you] doe apoynte to make your p'ambulacon [i.e. perambulation] W[ithin] that rape by such convenient division thereof as to yo'selves [i.e. yourselves] shall seeme best to app'hend [i.e. apprehend] all idle and loose persons and other dangereuse people or vagabonds that are to be suspected of any fellonyes or other disorders. That they may be brought to the next Justice of Peace (if Cause require) or otherwise to be committed to the constable to be justified accordinge to the Lawe, And that you do continue this course iij [i.e. three] tymes in the weeke at the leaste and afterwards as you shall hand have further directions; and so not doubteinge of yor good care accordingly, we bid you heartely farewell.

This reference to Mr Earnely of Chichester in 1624, appears to have been one of the last times a male Ernle was alive and active in the county. By the time of the 1634 heraldic Visitation of Sussex, the remaining Sussex Ernle heritage was represented by Bridget, da. [i.e. daughter] of Richard Ernley and wife of Richard Stanney.

Reference to the records of the Archbishop of Canterbury's testamentary jurisdiction provides the final evidences of the extinction of the Sussex line:

"Abstracts of Probate Acts in the Prerogative Court of Canterbury, volume 1, 1630-34", p. 146

Anno 1632 ERNLE, Richard, of Cackham (Cakeham, p. West Wittering), Sussex, Esq. Will [66 Audley] pr. June 16 by rel. Susan. P.r. ELIZ. RISHTON

"Abstracts of Probate Acts in the Prerogative Court of Canterbury, Supplement. Sentences and complete index nominum, 1630-1639", p. 32

ERNLE, Richard, of Cackham, Sussex, Esq. Extrix. v. sister BRIDGET STANNY Sent. pro. val. test., June 16, 1632 [66 Audley] Will [66 Audley] pr[oved] same date.

Thus we see why the 1634 Sussex Visitation showed Bridget Stanney as the representative of the Ernle family in Sussex, for her brother had died sometime before the final disposition of his worldly estate by will and sentence of 16 June 1632.

It is not surprising, then, that, when the 1662 heraldic Visitation of Sussex was made, no further pedigree was recorded for the ancient Sussex family of Ernle, and what Ernle blood remained in the county was inherited via the female line, as in the case of the Stanney or Stanny and Rishton families.

Thus was extinguished one of the ancient historic surnames of the county of Sussex. The Sussex Ernle family might have deserved some place in Sir J. Bernard Burke's chronicle of the rise and fall from prominence of old names, The Vicissitudes of Families, though he chiefly concerned himself with the demise of families comprising the greater nobility of the realm.

== Rise from local to national prominence under the Tudors ==
The Ernle family maintained their manorial demesne at Earnley on the Sussex coast for centuries. In the early Tudor period, the original, or Sussex branch, of the Ernle family gave rise to Sir John Ernle (or Ernley), Knight, Lord Chief Justice of the Court of Common Pleas (1519–1520), whose career, begun during the reign of King Henry VII of England reached its height in the reign of his son and successor, King Henry VIII of England. Sir John Ernley's legal and judicial career and family connexions are detailed in the DNB and its successor, the Oxford Dictionary of National Biography.

Sir John's descendants remained in Sussex through the Elizabethan and Jacobean periods maintaining their connexion with the manor of Earnley until its sale in 1630, during the first years of the reign of King Charles I. Thereafter, it becomes harder to trace the descent of the Sussex branch of the family, though there are traces of it in Sussex in the 17th and 18th centuries as well as in neighbouring Hampshire.

In 1538, under Henry VIII, William Ernle, son of Sir John Ernle, Lord Chief Justice, was sent to Chichester cathedral as a royal commissioner along with Sir William Goring to take down the Shrine of St Richard of Chichester located there.

As Chichester cathedral was the chief church of the diocese where their estates lay, and St Richard was a local saint whose Shrine was decorated by pilgrims and members of the local gentry for over 250 years during the pre-Reformation period, this task was partly a test of the Sussex Ernle family head's loyalty to the new religion, the Church of England, whereof, on earth, the king had declared his royal supremacy supplanting the authority of the pope.

Local legends at West Wittering in Sussex (a place where the Ernle family also held lands at this time) which claim that the bones of St Richard were hidden in a tomb there give rise to the possibility that this William Ernle or someone closely associated with him managed to secure the saint's relics for posterity when the removal and destruction of the ornaments and relics of St Richard's Shrine took place partly under Ernle's direction. William Ernle and Elizabeth his wife's tombs with their partially destroyed inscriptions are considered by historians to lie in West Wittering parish church, so the connexion, if true, was close.

Be that as it may, later generations of Sussex Ernles appear to have conformed to the Church of England more enthusiastically. In 1564, Mr Richard Ernlie (misprinted as Crulie), of Cackham (now Cakeham), Sussex, son of William, the royal commissioner of 1538, is listed as being one of the gentlemen of Sussex who was designated as being among the "favourers of godlie procedinges", indicating that he was by then a staunch, if rather sobre, Anglican, when such a description was a mark of approval from Church and State alike.

== Migration to and proliferation in Wiltshire ==
=== Migration ===
In the 18th century, the senior Wiltshire branch of the Ernle family claimed that they had established themselves in Wiltshire and abandoned their ancestral lands in Sussex in order to avoid any further exposure to England's seafaring enemies caused by their estate's proximity to the Sussex coast. Examination of their published pedigree reveals that, in fact, the two branches of the family, seated in Sussex and Wiltshire, existed simultaneously for over a century.

By the 17th century, however, the name Ernle seems virtually to have disappeared from Sussex, while the branch established in Wiltshire by John Ernle, The Elder, Esq., of Fosbury, Wiltshire and Bishop's Cannings, Wiltshire (born 1464/5), elder brother of Sir John Ernle, Lord Chief Justice of the Court of Common Pleas (1519–1520), or his ancestors, continued to flourish in its new home.

Recorded in the Visitation of Wiltshire in 1565, and, again, in 1623, the main seat of the family in Wiltshire was at Bourton manorhouse, said to be a former priory in the parish of Bishop's Cannings, but the initial connexion of the family with Wiltshire seems to have stemmed not from this estate but from the marriage in the first third of the 15th century of a Sussex Ernle to the heiress of an old Wiltshire manorial family, Malwyn (or Malwain) of Etchilhampton (alias Ashlington), sometimes recorded as being of "Chilhampton" (another form of the place name, Etchilhampton).

In contrast, the following account given by Archdeacon Macdonald in the Wiltshire Archæological and Natural History Society Magazine (1860) reflects the traditional view of how the connexion of the Ernle family was forged with Wiltshire:

"Tything of Bourton and Easton (Consolidated)."

"Bourton was one of the seats of the ancient family of Ernle, who came into possession of this property in the time of Henry VIII; John son of William de Ernle having purchased the estate on the dissolution of the monasteries; the land being said to have been Priory property, but for this we have only vague traditional authority, no account of any religious house there, being to be found in any of the best works on the subject. The Ernle property at Echilhampton [Etchilhampton] belonged to the ancient family of Malwyn, came into the Ernle family with Joan Best wife of John Ernle..."

This tradition needs to be examined carefully, for it contains two sections that require separation so that its true significance is understood.

First, the acquisition of the lands at Bourton could not have occurred in the lifetime of William de Ernle's son John Ernle because he died in 1417 according to a Sussex inquisition post mortem. The period of monastic dissolution occurred over a century later in the period 1538 to 1541. As an aside, this may also be the reason why no one has been able to find a record of the sale of Bourton as a monastic property in the latter period.

Secondly, a better idea of when the Ernle link with Wiltshire was forged can, however, be gleaned from the latter half of the foregoing account. The aforementioned heiress of the Malwyn family, Joan Best (daughter of Simon Best and his wife Agnes, daughter of John Malwyn or Malwain, Esq., lord of the manor of Etchilhampton) must have married John Ernle of Sussex, not later than about 1430, for their son, another John Ernle (of Sidlesham and Earnley, Sussex), was himself already a father of young sons when he died in 1465, naming his mother Joan (born c. 1410 to 1415) and wife, Margaret (née Morley, of Glynde Place, Sussex) in his will dated that year.

The Ernle family, however, did not inherit Etchilhampton until several intervening heirs of the Malwain's property had first occupied it and then themselves died before Joan Best's senior heir, her grandson, John Ernle of Fosbury, Wiltshire, finally gained possession of the estate many years after his grandmother's death.

Before their eventual inheritance of these lands in Wiltshire, it is not surprising then that the Ernle family concentrated their activities on Sussex, while maintaining a presence in both counties.

Christopher Whittick's DNB account of Sir John Ernley's career has this to say about the Ernle family's two-county history:

The family had been lords of the manor of Earnley near Chichester since the 13th century [sic, properly since the 12th]...the acquisition by marriage of lands and a parliamentary seat in Wiltshire in the 1430s, and legal preferment in Sussex after the Yorkist victory in 1460...

culminated, in terms of the early modern period, in the career of the Lord Chief Justice Ernle under the first two Tudor monarchs.

Supportive of these statements is the following evidence that the head of the Sussex family of Ernle, William Ernle, esq., of Earnley, is named both in Sussex and in Wiltshire as holding lands by the same source, which shows him as having interests in both counties in the same year, viz.:

Inquisitions and assessments relating to feudal aids: with other analogous documents preserved in the Public Record Office, A. D. 1284-1431, vol. 5

p. 155

A.D. 1428 [page heading] [section covering the county of Sussex] Rapus Cicestrie Hundredum de Manewode WILLELMUS de ERNLE tenet iiijtam partem j.f. in ERNLE quondam JOHANNIS ERNLE, subsidium xx.d.

[translated from Latin to English as]

The Rape of Cicestrie [i.e. Chichester] The Hundred of Manwode [i.e. Manwood, now Manhood]

WILLIAM de ERNLE holds the fourth part of j.f. in EARNLEY formerly held by John ERNLE, paying a subsidy [i.e. a tax] of 20 pence

p. 164

Inquisicio capta apud Arundell die Lune proximo post festum Sancti Dunstani anno etc. (as before [i.e. 1428, on p. 163, where the section starts] ) de parochiis infra decanatus de Boxgrave, Midherst, Arundell et Storgheton in quibus decem persone inhabitantes domicilia tenentes existunt per sacramenta WILLELMI ERNLE, Johannis Wystryng, Thome Cotes, Thome Stedham, Willelmi atte Tye, Johannis Strode, Willelmi Preston, Roberti Palmer, Ricardi Danell, Johannis Michelgrove, Johannis Goringe, et Willelmi Merew, qui vero jurati dicunt super sacramentum quod:-

Sunt in parochiis supscriptis ut sequitur:-

[Englished from Latin]

Inquisition taken at Arundell on the Monday next after the feast of St Dunstan in the year etc. (1428) concerning the parishes listed as falling under the jurisdiction of the deanery of Boxgrave [modern Boxgrove], Midherst [modern Midhurst], Arundell [modern Arundel], and Storgheton in which ten persons inhabiting dwellings exist by the oath of WILLIAM ERNLE, John Wystryng, Thomas Cotes, Thomas Stedham, William atte Tye, John Strode, William Preston, Robert Palmer [likely ERNLE relation], Richard Danell, John Michelgrove [a name associated with the ERNLE family], John Goringe [another name associated with ERNLEs, though more usually found as Goring], and William Merew, who say by true oaths upon the holy sacrament that

there are in the parishes above written and which follow:-

BOXGRAVE [deanery]

[four parishes intervening]

In parochia de ERNLE rector ibidem. WILLELMUS ERNLE, Willelmus Alfreld, Thomas Chapman, Ricardus Palmere, Johannes Bregger, Robertus Palmere.

[That is to say]

In the parish of ERNLE, the rector of the same. WILLIAM ERNLE, William Alfreld, Thomas Chapman, Richard Palmer(e), John Bregger, Robert Palmer(e).

p. 247

A.D. 1428 [page heading]

WILLELMUS ERNELEY tenet immediate de quo vel quibus ignorant, certa terras et tenementa in Yatesbury que nuper fuerunt Agnetis Burdon, per servicium un. f. m.

[rendered into English from Latin as follows]

WILLIAM ERNELEY holds through subinfeudation, but from whom exactly is unknown, various lands in Yatesbury which were formerly held by Agnes Burdon, by the service of one f. m.

Provided, of course, that these references do indeed relate to the same William ERNLE, this seems to indicate that while based at La Manwode in the parish of Earnley in Sussex in 1428, where, by being the first named, he would appear to have been the chiefmost resident (as holder of the manor of Earnley), he also held lands formerly in the possession of Agnes Burdon (widow of Nicholas, elsewhere recorded as Durdon, apparently erroneously) at Yatesbury in Wiltshire. The significance of this connexion between EARNLEY, Sussex and Yatesbury, Wiltshire—while not as obvious as the one with Fosbury, Wiltshire with which John ERNLE, The Elder, was later associated—is not, however, to be glossed over lightly. For, whereas Fosbury, and later Bishop's Cannings in Wiltshire, became the main seat of the ERNLE family; significantly, they also held Yatesbury for centuries, perhaps starting in or before 1428 (and no earlier than 1412 when no ERNLE is recorded in an early subsidy roll for Wiltshire). For example, Francis ERNLE, third son of John ERNLE, of Burton in Bishop's Cannings (d. 1572), was described as gentleman, of Yatesbury in his will, and his children retained the connexion.

In 1412, however, we see that while the ERNLE family was present as major landholders in Sussex, they had not yet forged their connexion with Wiltshire, viz.:

Inquisitions and assessments relating to feudal aids : with other analogous documents preserved in the Public Record Office, A. D. 1284-1431, vol. 6.

p. 520

Sussex A.D. 1412

p. 522 [same county]

WILLELMUS ERNELE habet maneria etc. cum pertinenciis, que valent xxi. li. xiij. s. videlicet terras etc. in MANWODE apud ERNELE xx. li., et terras etc. in MENESSE liij. s. iiij. d. Et que terras etc.

[translated from Latin into English this reads]

WILLIAM ERNELE has the manor et cetera with its appurtenances worth 21 pounds and 13 shillings, that is to say, lands etc. in MANWODE in the vicinity of ERNELE worth 20 pounds, and lands etc. in MENESSE valued at 52 shillings and 4 pence. And that these lands etc....

According to the Wiltshire section of the book, p. 541, Yatesbury was then held by Henricus Thorp, while, John MALWAIN or MALWYN, of Etchilhampton, Wilts., a later ERNLE ancestor (see additional references earlier in this section) appears on p. 540, as:

Johannes MALWAYN habet terras etc. qui valent etc. xxv. li., videlicet in ECHELHAMPTON, WODHAMPTON, ERCHESFONTE, et CONOK xx. li. et apud MERTON, c. s.

[translated from Latin into English follows]

John MALWAYN has lands etc. which are valued etc. at 25 pounds, that is to say, in ECHELHAMPTON, WODHAMPTON (modern Woodhampton, Wilts.), ERCHESFONTE (modern Urchfont, Wilts.), and CONOK (modern Conock in the parish of Chirton, Wilts.), worth 20 pounds, and in and about MERTON, 50 shillings. (If not in Wiltshire, this Merton may refer to the one in Surrey, in which case it was probably acquired through the family's known London mercantile interests. The other localities are all in Wiltshire).

The dual presence of the ERNLE family in Sussex and Wiltshire seems to have been maintained for some generations as is evident from the fact that John ERNLE, The Elder, Esq., of Fosbury, was appointed as one of the four commissioners for Wiltshire in the 13 Hen. VII (1496) parliament, as

Johes. ERNLEY (along with Christopher Tropnell, Cristoforus Tropynell, John Gawen Johes Gawen, and George Chatterton, Georgius Chaderton),

while some 9 years later, his younger brother, the confusingly-named John ERNLE (later Sir John ERNLE, Knight, Lord Chief Justice of the Court of Commons Pleas), sat as one of the ten Members of Parliament allotted to the county Sussex in the 19th year of Henry VII's reign [1505] as

John ERNLY, Gentilman [denoting the rank he held as an Esquire's younger son]

found in the circle of his Sussex kin and neighbours (Thomas Fynes [Fiennes], Knight; John Coke [Cooke], Esquyer; John Goryng [Goring], Esquyer; and Roger Leykenour [Lewknor] of Tangermer [modern Tangmere]), and significantly found listed here in the company of the ill-fated Edmond Dudley, Esquyer, recent Speaker of the House of Commons, and leading minister to the king, to whom ERNLE owed so much of his later rise to prominence, while fortunately avoiding the fate of his ill-starred patron. Indeed, after Dudley's execution in 1510, the younger John ERNLE appeared in the rolls of Parliament for 1513 as one of the 15 M.P.s for Sussex (among them a brace of Lewknors, two Fiennes, a Covert, all neighbours and kin), and, notably on the rise, as attorney to an approving master, the King, viz.:

Joh'es ERNLEY, Attorn. Regis [i.e. John ERNLEY, King's Attorney]

(see Rotuli Parliamentorum : ut et petitiones et placita in parliamento, vol. 6, pp. 518 & 541; vol. 7, p. 36)

=== Proliferation of the Wiltshire Ernle family ===
Nonetheless, the fortunes of the Sussex branch of the family went into a slow decline under the heirs of Sir John Ernley (died 1520): his son William Ernle, M.P., of Cakeham, Sussex, (died 1545), and grandson Richard Ernle (died 1577). Wiltshire, however, proved to be fertile ground for the expansion of the family over successive generations.

John Ernle of Fosbury (fl. 1507) had three sons: John his heir (died 1556), Anthony, of Laverstoke, Wilts. (died 1530), and William, a Fellow of New College, Oxford, and later parish priest of Yatesbury, Wilts.

John Ernle (died 1556), in turn, had a son and heir John Ernle (died 1572) and William Ernle, founder of the Dorset branch of the family.

John Ernle (died 1572), married Mary, daughter of William Hyde, Esq., of Denchworth, Berkshire, and had three sons: Michael his heir (d. 1593/4); Thomas (died 1595), of Brembridge manor, Dilton, Westbury, Wilts., and Francis, of Yatesbury, Wilts. John and Mary also had one daughter, Anne, who married Robert Partridge (or Partrydge) (d. 1600), of Wishanger manor, Miserden, Gloucestershire, in about 1566.

The proliferation of cadet branches in Wiltshire, however, arose chiefly from the two marriages of Michael Ernle (died 1593/4), first to the heiress of the Whetham House estate, Mary Finnemore, and, secondly, to Susan Hungerford, the daughter of Sir Walter Hungerford by his second wife, Anne Dormer. From these two marriages, there were ten children giving rise to a number of cadet branches of the family seated throughout the county. The chief (senior-most) of these lived at Whetham House in the parish of Calne, Wiltshire. There were also branches elsewhere in Wiltshire: at Conock, parish of Chirton; All Cannings; Etchilhampton alias Ashlington; Brimslade Park, Wootton Rivers; and Burytown, Bury Blunsdon, parish of Highworth.

==== Baronetcy ====
Of these, the most prominent was the branch descended from Edward Ernle, son of Michael Ernle, Esq., of Bourton (died 1595), by his second wife, Susan Hungerford, daughter of Sir Walter Hungerford, Kt, of Farley Castle, Somerset, a granddaughter of the executed Walter, Lord Hungerford. Baptised at Calne in 1587, Edward Ernle, and his wife Gertrude St Lowe, were progenitors of the Ernle Baronets of Etchilhampton, alias Ashlington, Wiltshire, and the 'self-styled' Ernle baronets of Brimslade Park. It was their son, Sir Walter Ernle, Knight, of Etchilhampton, who was created a baronet shortly after the Restoration by Charles II on 2 February 1660/1, as Sir Walter Ernle, 1st Baronet. Passing first through his own heirs, the baronetcy was used, with doubtful authority, according to The Complete Baronetage, by the Brimslade Park branch of the family established by his younger brother, Michael Ernle, gent., of Brimslade. That line, too, died out, and the soi-disant baronet's dignities, real or imagined, were finally extinguished with the death in 1787 of the Reverend Sir Edward Ernle, 7th Baronet, D.D., the Anglican rector of Avington, Berkshire, without issue, at the age of 75.

==== Cadet lines ====
In addition, cadet branches stemming from Michael Ernle's forebears include those derived from his father John Ernle's second son, Thomas Ernle, gent., of Brembridge manor, Dilton, Westbury, Wiltshire (died 1595), and his third and youngest son, Francis Ernle, gent., of Yatesbury, Wiltshire. Earlier still, a cadet line derived from Michael Ernle's uncle, William Ernle, had established itself at Sutton Benger, Wiltshire, and later at Chalbury in Dorset.

==== Brembridge or Bremeridge manor line at Dilton, an 18th-century survival ====
This line was established by Thomas Ernle (I), gent. (died 1595), second of the three sons, with one daughter, of John Ernle, Esq., of Bourton Priory, Bishop's Cannings, Wiltshire, by his wife, Mary, daughter of William Hyde, Esq., of Denchworth, Berkshire.

The Brembridge or Bremeridge manor branch of the family proliferated through the fourteen children – ten sons and four daughters – of Thomas Ernle (died 1595) and his wife Bridget (died 1610), daughter of Richard Franklin, of Overton, Wilts.

The eldest son, Thomas Ernle (II), gent. (died 1639), married Praxed or Praxeda Lambe, a daughter of John Lambe (d.v.p. 1615), a son of the lord of the manor of Coulston, Wiltshire. Thomas (II) became lessee of the manor of Abingdon Court, Cricklade St Sampson, Wiltshire, in succession to his father, and held the advowson of St Sampson's parish church, Cricklade.

From him was descended the Ernle family of Braydon and Purton, Wiltshire, continued by Thomas (II)'s son, Thomas (III), gent., of Braydon, Purton (1614–1694), and his wife, Jane, daughter of the Antwerp-born naturalised London merchant, Philip Jacobson, gent., King's Jeweller, to James I of England and Charles I of England, and fee-farmer of estates in Braydon Forest, Wiltshire.

Other sons of the line's founder established themselves elsewhere: Edward Ernle, gent., (1577–1655) at Bath, Somerset; Francis Ernle, gent. (born 1577) in the parish of St John Zachary in London; William Ernle, gent. (1583–1663) at Bideford in Devon.

The line at Bremeridge itself was continued by Richard Ernle, gent. (1584–1650), seventh son of the original Thomas Ernle (I) (died 1595). He married Elizabeth Cogswell, a member of the wealthy family of clothiers in Westbury parish, Wiltshire, and their line continued until the last scion of that family, another Richard Ernle, was buried at Old Dilton chapelry, Westbury, Wiltshire, in 1786, aged 84.

==== Distaff relatives: female lines ====
Today the surname Ernle only survives as an inheritance via the female line, employed by the Plunkett-Ernle-Erle-Drax family of Charborough House, Dorset, whose head is the Westminster M.P., Richard Drax, otherwise Richard Grosvenor Plunkett-Ernle-Erle-Drax, Esq., but there are few mentions of the Ernle women over the centuries.

Most Ernle daughters made suitable marital alliances with members of other gentry families, but it can still be difficult to trace their posterity beyond the first or second generation. Often all that is known of an Ernle wife is her name, her father's name, and his rank and the name of the place where he had his estate or resided. One slight exception is noteworthy simply due to the paucity of other material. It comes from an epitaph and extols the chief adornment that any lady of good family in times past could bring to her husband besides a dowry of money and land: physical beauty. The quotation comes from John Aubrey's Collections for Wiltshire, under the section on the parish of Calne:

Here under liethe the body of Lady Frances Mildmay, wife to Sir Thomas Mildmay. She dyed in the faith of Christ the ninth of December, 1624. She was daughter to Sir Jno. Ernle of Whetham, and was a very rare beauty.

== New national prominence: Civil War, Anglo-Dutch Wars, and the later Stuarts ==
The senior line at Whetham House, near Calne, Wiltshire, gave rise to the Right Honourable Sir John Ernle (1620–1697), Knight, P.C., M.P., Chancellor of the Exchequer to kings Charles II and James II from 1676 to 1689, whose biography is given in the Oxford Dictionary of National Biography.

Another member of the Whetham line, Sir Michael Ernle (1599-?1645), Knight, uncle to the Chancellor, was a royalist commander during the English Civil War. His end is unclear, as John Aubrey's Natural History of Wiltshire, points out:

Sir Michael Ernele, Knight, was second son of Sir John Ernele, of Whetham in the County of Wilts. After he had spent some time at the University of Oxford, he betooke himself to a militarie life in the Low Countries, where he became so good a proficient that at his return into England at the beginning of the Civill warres, King Charles the First gave him the commission of a Colonell in his service, and shortly after he was made Governour of Shrewsbury, and he was, or intended to bee, Major Generall. He did his Majesty good service in the warres, as doth appeare by the Mercurii Aulici. His garrison at Shrewsbury being weakened by drawing out great part of them before the battle at Marston Moore, the townesmen plotted and betrayed his garrison to the Parliament soldiers. He was slain then in the market-place, about the time of the battle of Marston Moore.*

* [It was the common belief that Sir Michael Erneley was killed, as here stated, by the Parliamentary soldiers at the time Shrewsbury was taken (Feb. 3, 1644–5); but in Owen and Blakeway's Hist, of Shrewsbury, 4to. 1825, the time and manner of his death is left uncertain. His name is included in the list of those who were made prisoners when the town surrendered.—J. B.]

Sir John Ernle, R.N. (1647–1686), Knight, of Burytown, Bury Blunsdon (otherwise Broad Blunsdon in Highworth parish), Wiltshire, eldest son of the foregoing Chancellor of the Exchequer, was an English naval officer during the Anglo-Dutch Wars, notably commanding H.M.S. Dover at the Battle of Solebay at the start of the Third Anglo-Dutch War in 1672. He is also mentioned in John Aubrey's Natural History of Wiltshire

Sir John Ernele, great-grandson of Sir John Ernele above sayd, and eldest son of Sir John Ernele, late Chancellour of the Exchequer, had the command of a flagship, and was eminent in some sea services. He married the daughter and heir of Sir John Kerle [modern, Kyrle] of .... [Much Marcle] in Herefordshire.

His son, John Kyrle Ernle, Esq. (1683–1725), of Whetham, Calne, Wiltshire, and Much Marcle, Herefordshire, entertained Queen Anne at Whetham.

== Devon ==
William Ernle (1583–1663), gent., sixth of the tens sons, with four daughters, of Thomas Ernle, gent., of Bremeridge manor, Dilton, Wiltshire, and his wife, Bridget, daughter of Richard Franklin, established himself as a merchant at Bideford, Devon. He married Philippa, a daughter of Edmund Tremayne, by his wife, Elizabeth St Ledger. He is mentioned in a work on the Bideford Witch trial, one of the last such events in England. In that text, the connexion to the Ernle at Newburgh Park, Coxwold, Yorkshire, is established from contemporary documents.

== Dorset ==
In the 17th century, a cadet branch of the Wiltshire-based family also established itself in Dorset, a county to the south-west of Wiltshire, where it was recorded in the Visitation of Dorset of 1623. Seated first at Sutton Benger, Wiltshire, it later became associated with Chalbury in Dorset. The published registers of the University of Oxford, Foster's Alumni Oxonienses show that members of the family persisted there, and elsewhere in Dorset, until well into the 18th century.

== Yorkshire ==
The Life of Marmaduke Rawdon notes that in the 17th century, one John Ernle (here recorded as Mr. John Earneley) was chiefe gentleman in the service of Lord Falconbridge (modern Fauconberg), whose seat was at Newburgh Park, near Coxwold, in the North Riding of Yorkshire. At that period, members of the lesser gentry often served the greater gentlefolk, which is to say, the nobility, a practice which gave rise to the expression, a gentleman's gentleman. Information about Ernle of Bideford, Devon shows that this Yorkshire gentleman belonged to the family of Ernle of Brembridge. In 1670, Mary, one of the daughters of John Earnley of Alne, gent. [Yorkshire] accused Anne Wilkinson, widow, of having used witchcraft against her and two of her sisters, allegedly causing the death of her sister, Eleanor. This anecdote serves to show the links not only between the Ernle family in Devon and Yorkshire, but also to demonstrate the shadow cast in both counties by the witchcraft hysteria then so prevalent.

LXXIX. Anne Wilkinson. York, Apr. 1, 1670. — Before Fr[ancis]. Driffield, Esq. Anne Mattson saith, that yesterday, Mary Earneley, daughter of Mr. John Earnley of Alne, fell into a very sicke fitt, in which shee continued a long time, sometimes cryinge out that Wilkinson wyfe prickt her with pins, clappinge her hands upon her thighs, intimatinge, as this informant thinketh, that she pricked her thighes. And other times shee cryed out, "That is shee," and said Wilkinson's wyfe run a spitt into her. Whereupon Mr. Earnley sent for Anne Wilkinson, widdow; and, when as the said Wilkinson came into the parlour where the said Mary Earnley lay, the said Mary Earnley shooted out and cryed, " Burne her, burne her, shee tormented two of my sisters." Shee saith further that two sisters of the said Mary Earnleye's dyed since Candlemasse last, and one of them upon the 19th of March last dyed, and, a little before her death, there was taken out of her mouth a blacke ribbond with a crooked pinne at the end of it. George Wrightson of Alne saith, that yesterday, Mary, dau. of John Earnley, gent., fell into a violent and sicke fitt and continued therein one houre and more, all that time crying out in a most sad and lamentable manner that Anne Wilkinson was cruelly prickinge and tormentinge her with pins, as the said Anne was sittinge by her owne fire upon a little chaire; and presently Mrs. Earnley sent this informant to the said Anne Wilkinson's house, whoe brought word shee was there sittinge by the fire upon a little chaire when he suddenly came into her house. Anne Wilkinson of Alne, widdow, saith that she never did Mr. Earnley, nor any that belonged to him, any harme, nor would shee doe; and, as for bewitchinge any of his children, she was sacklesse. Margaret, wife of Richard Wilson, sayth, that in her former husband John Akers' lifetime, she once lost out of her purse 50s. all but three halfe pence; and, shortly after, there happened to be a great wind, and after the wind was downe, she, this ex[aminan]t, mett with Anne Wilkinson, who fell into a great rage, bitterly cursing this ex[aminan]t., and telling her that she had been att a wise man, and had raised this wind which had put out her eyes, and that she was stout now she had gott her money againe, and wishing she might never thrive, which cursing of the said Anne did soe trouble this ex[aminan]t. that she fell a weeping, and, coming home told her mother what had happened, and her mother bad her put her trust in God, and she hoped she could doe her noe harme. And the next day she churned but could gitt noe butter; and, presently, after this ex[aminan]t. fell sicke, and so continued for neere upon two yeeres, till a Scotch phytsitian came to Tollerton, to whom this ex[aminan]t. went, and the phisitiane told her she had harme done her. And she further sayth that her said husband, John Acres, fell shortly after ill, and dy'd of a lingering disease, but, till then, he was very strong and healthfull.

— Depositions, pp. 176, 177

== Orthographical variety and recent use as a surname, forename, and titular territorial designation ==
The surname has many variants, including Erneley, Ernley, Earnely, Earneley and Ernly. Though apparently extinct in the male line in the United Kingdom, its current use as an ancient English surname has been actively maintained by its inclusion as the second component of the quadruple-barrelled patronymic, Plunkett-Ernle-Erle-Drax (see double-barrelled surname), borne by descendants of John William Plunkett, 17th Baron of Dunsany, whose wife was Ernle Elizabeth Louisa Maria Grosvenor Ernle-Erle-Drax, née Ernle Elizabeth Louisa Maria Grosvenor Burton (1855–1916), who was doubly descended, both in the female line, from members of the Wiltshire Ernle family.

As demonstrated in the foregoing passage, the name Ernle, Ernley (also Ernlé, Ernlè, Ernly, and Ernleigh) is also employed by descendants of the family and others as a given name. Examples include Ernle Bradford (1922–1986), the writer, and Alfred Ernle Montacute Chatfield, 1st Baron Chatfield, PC (1873–1967), and his son Ernle David Lewis Chatfield, 2nd Baron Chatfield (born 1917), (see also Baron Chatfield), and Sir Ernley Blackwell, KCB, legal assistant under-secretary of State at the Home Office (1906–1931). The British Conservative politician and writer Ernle Money was given the name at birth in 1931.

Additionally, it was also used as the name for the barony granted to Rowland Edmund Prothero (1851–1937), who was created the 1st Baron Ernle, on 4 February 1919, for whose career and family history consult L.G. Pine's New Extinct Peerage.
