= Plunkett-Ernle-Erle-Drax =

Arms of Drax of Charlborough Park

Plunkett-Ernle-Erle-Drax is the quadruple-barrelled surname of the descendants of Admiral The Honourable Sir Reginald Aylmer Ranfurly Plunkett-Ernle-Erle-Drax (1880–1967), who was the younger son of the 17th Baron of Dunsany by his wife Ernle Elizabeth Louisa Maria Grosvenor, née Burton, later Ernle-Erle-Drax (1855–1916). The surname of Plunkett-Ernle-Erle-Drax was assumed in lieu of Plunkett, his name from birth, by royal licence on 4 October 1916. Ernle is pronounced earnly.

The current head of the family is former MP Richard Grosvenor Plunkett-Ernle-Erle-Drax, otherwise known as Richard Drax. The family seat is Charborough House in Dorset.

See Burke's Peerage and Baronetage under the account of the Dunsany barony for a complete listing of the Plunkett-Ernle-Erle-Drax family.

== See also ==
- Reginald Plunkett
- Thomas Erle Drax
- Drax Hall Estate
