= Earnley =

Village and parish in West Sussex, England

Coordinates: 50.76619°N 0.84538°W

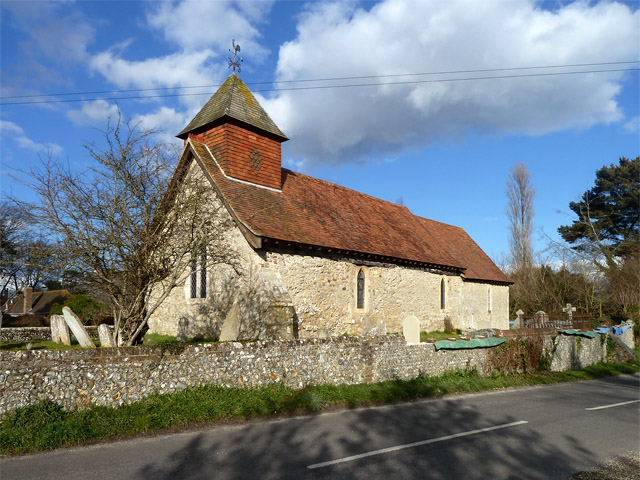
- Earnley parish church

- Location within West Sussex
- Area: 7.10 km^{2} (2.74 sq mi)
- Population: 459. 2011 Census
  - Density: 63/km^{2} (160/sq mi)
- OS grid reference: SZ815969
  - London: 60 miles (97 km) NNE
- Civil parish: Earnley
- District: Chichester
- Shire county: West Sussex
- Region: South East
- Country: England
- Sovereign state: United Kingdom
- Post town: CHICHESTER
- Postcode district: PO20
- Dialling code: 01243
- Police: Sussex
- Fire: West Sussex
- Ambulance: South East Coast
- UK Parliament: Chichester
- Website: http://earnleypc.org/

Earnley is a village and a civil and ecclesiastical parish in the Chichester District of West Sussex, England. It is located four miles (6.4 km) south-west of Chichester, and lies on the south coast of England. The parish includes the settlements of Almodington and Batchmere.

== History ==
An Anglo-Saxon charter of AD 780 (Note: The AD 780 charter (Charter WSRO Cap I/17/2) is the only Selsey charter to survive as an original.) names a piece of land as 'Earnaleach and Tielesora' that was given to the church of St Paul. (Note: The location of St Paul has not been identified, but was possibly at Wittering or Selsey.) Then in a charter, dated AD930, King Æthelstan granted to Bishop Beornheah of Selsey, (Note: The Sussex Diocese was based in Selsey from c.681-c.1075) land at Medmerry in Selsey 'with the woodland and fields lying therewith called Erneleia'.

Historically Earnley was situated in the hundred of La Manwode or Manwood, now known under the form Manhood. The name La Manwode means 'the common wood' and extended round Hundredsteddle (Note: The word steddle was quite common in Sussex various examples being: Bedsteddle - Bedstead; Jointsteddle - a stool framed by joinery work; Oxsteddle - Stabling or stalls for oxen; Steddle - a small side table or a temporary arrangement of boards and trestles.) Farm, where the boundaries of the Witterings, Birdham, and Earnley coincide. Hundredsteddle was the meeting place for the hundred moot and other hundred business. The name Hundredsteddle refers to the floor on which the Hundred court would have sat. It lay in the ancient pre-Conquest division of Sussex known as the Rape (county subdivision) of Chichester. The Domesday survey does not include Earnley, however it is possible that at that time it was included with East Wittering or West Wittering. The mediæval lords of the manor here belonged to the Ernle, Ernley, or Erneley family, and derived their surname from a manor they held in this parish. The land was given to Luke de Ernele by his nephew, William de Lancing as part of a Knight's fee, in 1166.

Earnley Church is a grade II* listed church and together with its small graveyard is contained within retaining stone walls of an interesting boat shaped island of land. The nave is of 13th-century origin. A century later the chancel was added; an aumbry fitted with a carved door dates back to the 14th century. The first recorded rector was in office in 1365; parish registers survive from 1562, but there is no record of a dedication. It has always simply been "Earnley Church".

== Placename ==
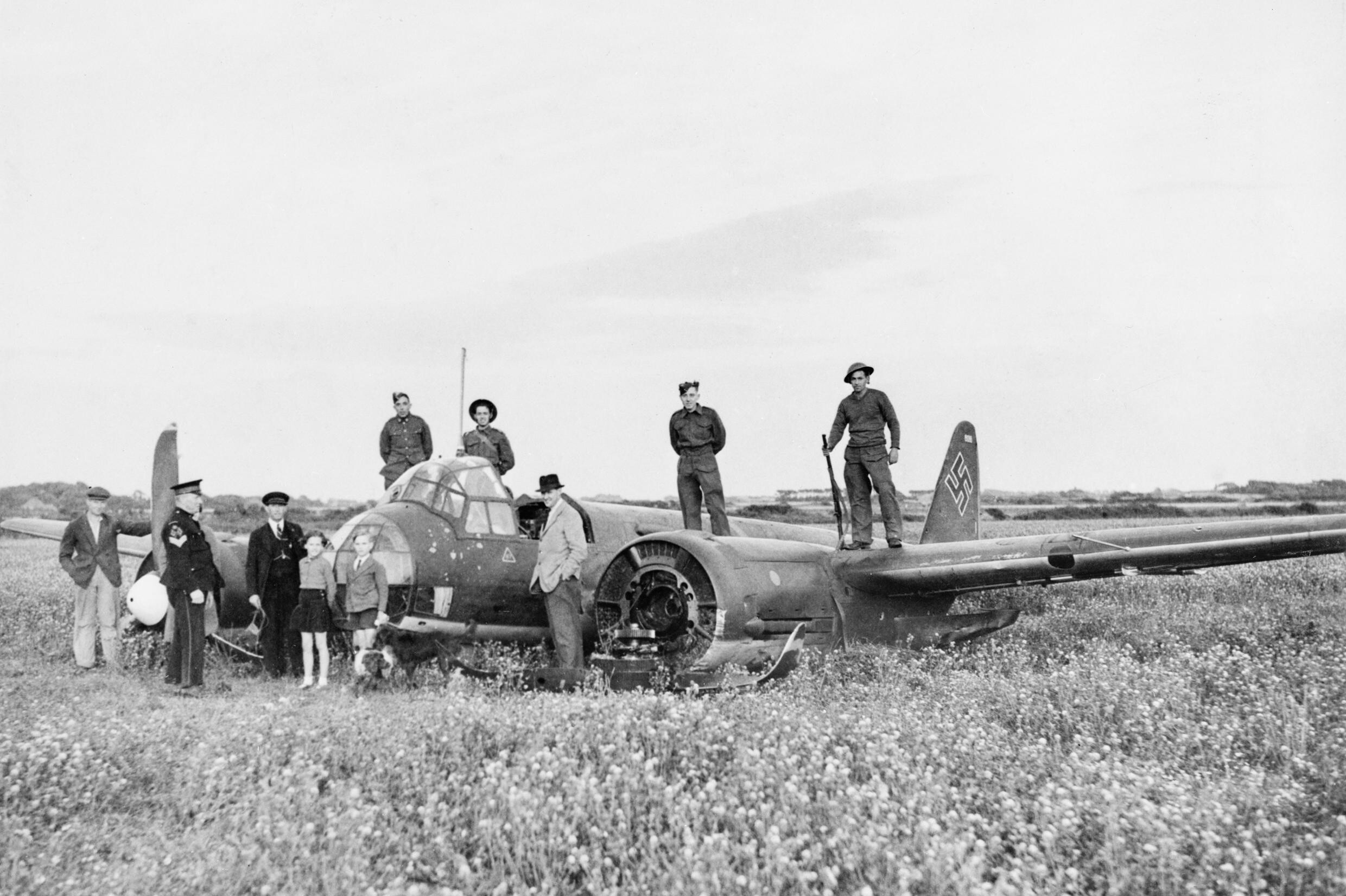
Junkers Ju 88A-1 (B3+BM) of 4./KG 54, which belly-landed on Marsh Farm, on the evening of 21 August 1940, it had been intercepted by No. 17 Squadron Hurricanes during an attack on RAF Brize Norton

The O.E. form of Earnley was Earnlēah. 'Earn' meaning Eagle (or possibly a person's name) and 'lēah' wood, glade or clearing.

== Culture and community ==
The Earnley Annual Fete is usually held in June by the Earnley Parish Council it raises funds for local charities like the RNLI and St Wilfrid's Hospice.

== Landmarks ==
Part of the Site of Special Scientific Interest Bracklesham Bay runs along the coastline of the parish.
