= Drax Hall Estate =

17th-century plantation in Barbados

Coordinates: 13°08′40″N 59°31′15″W

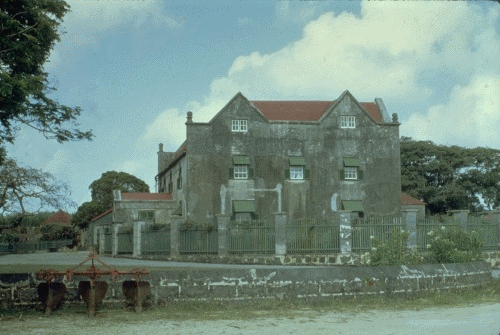

Drax Hall, Barbados

Drax Hall Estate is a sugarcane plantation situated in Saint George, Barbados, in the Caribbean.

Drax Hall still stands on the site where sugarcane was first cultivated on Barbados and is one of the island's two remaining Jacobean houses.

== History ==
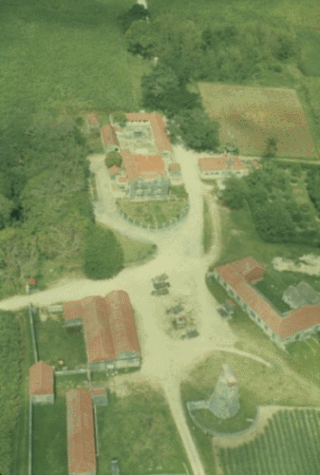

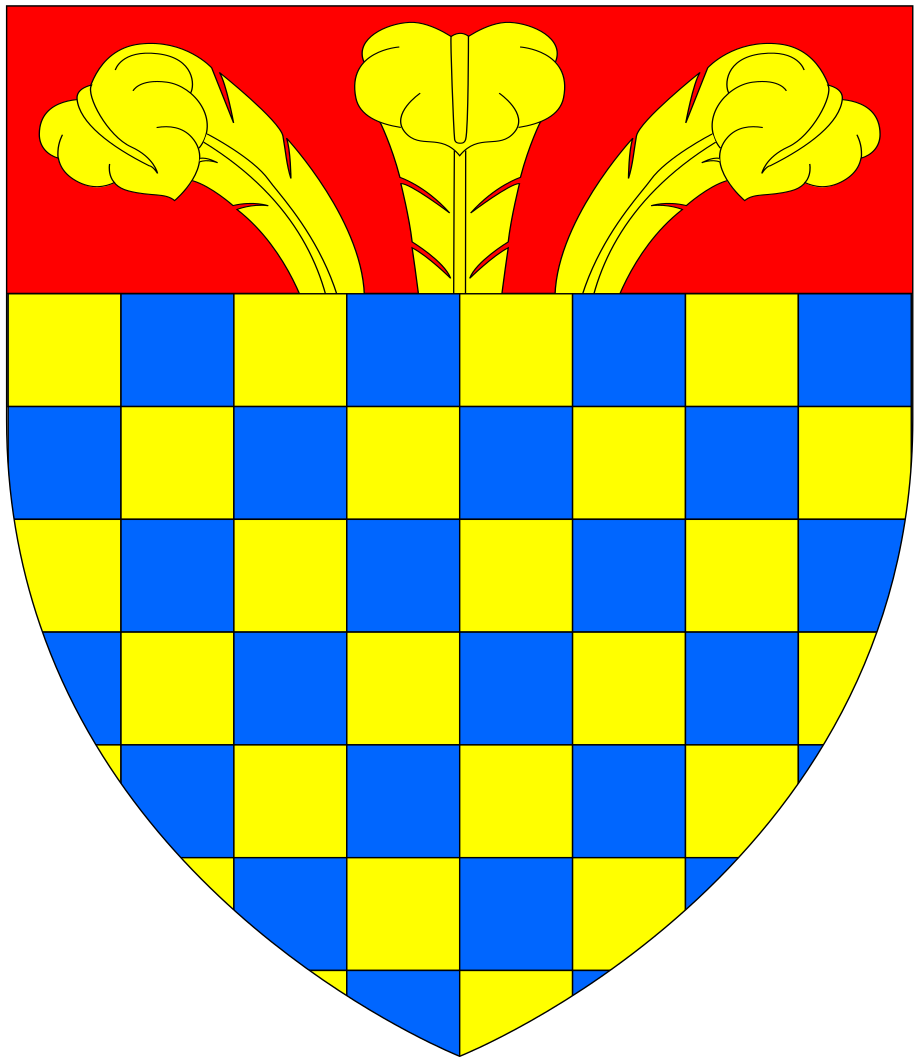
Drax arms: Chequy or and azure, on a chief gules three ostrich feathers in plume issuant of the first

The estate has belonged to the Drax family since the early 1650s when it was built by James Drax and his brother, William Drax, early settlers in Jamaica. The Drax's Caribbean slave plantations and estates then descended with that of Charborough House in Dorset.

By 1680, Henry Drax was the owner of the largest plantations on Barbados, then in the parish of St. John. A planter-merchant, Drax had a hired "proper persons' to act in, and do all business in Bridgetown".

=== Legacy ===
Historian Hilary Beckles estimated that close to 30,000 enslaved African men, women and children died on the Drax Caribbean plantations over 200 years. By 1832, there were 275 people enslaved on the plantation, producing 300 tons of sugar and 140 puncheons of rum.

=== Ownership ===
The estate continues as a sugar plantation but Drax Hall is closed to the public, although its grounds spanning much of the eastern landscape of the parish of Saint George are open to visitors. The current owner is Richard Plunkett-Ernle-Erle-Drax, a British former member of parliament, who inherited the property after the death of his father, Henry Walter Plunkett-Ernle-Erle-Drax (1928–2017), a former High Sheriff of Dorset. The Drax family also owned slave plantations in Jamaica, which they sold in the mid-1700s.

In April 2024, the Barbadian government planned to buy the estate for £3 million for housing; however, this plan was later cancelled.

== See also ==
- Admiral the Hon. Sir Reginald Plunkett-Ernle-Erle-Drax
- List of plantations in Barbados
