= Ernle baronets =

Extinct baronetcy in the Baronetage of England

Edge baronets
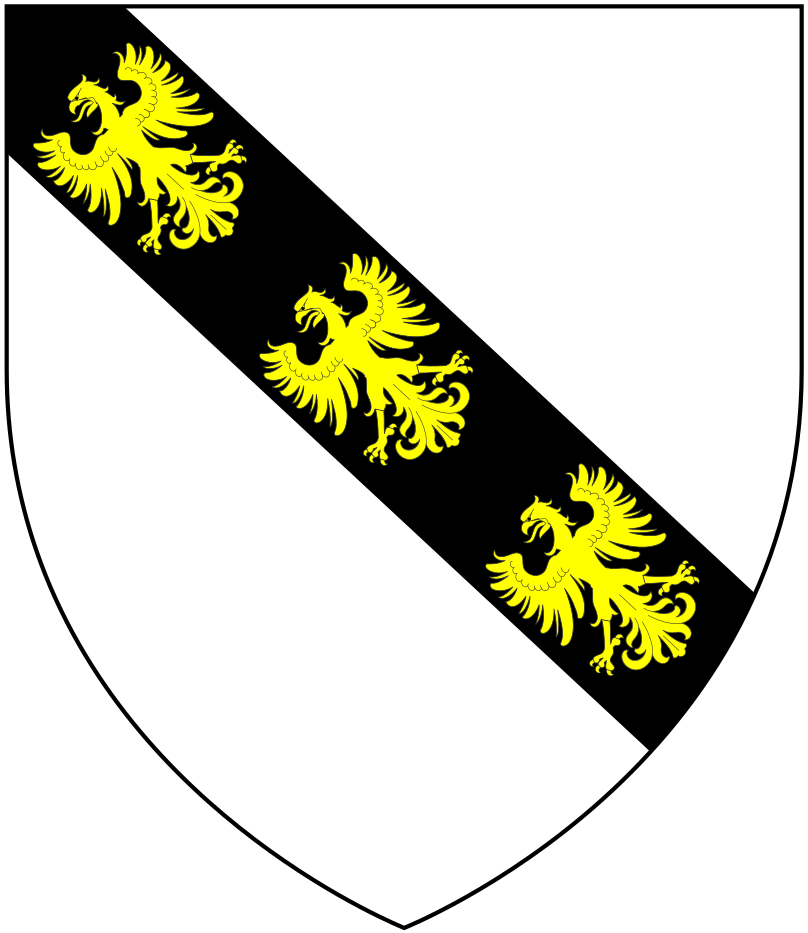
- Escutcheon of the Ernle baronets of Etchilhampton
- Creation date: 1661
- Status: extinct
- Extinction date: 1734
- Arms: Argent, on a bend sable three eagles displayed or

The Ernle Baronetcy, of Etchilhampton in the County of Wiltshire, was a title in the Baronetage of England. It was created on 2 February 1661 for Walter Ernle, later Member of Parliament for Devizes. He died on 25 July 1682, and was buried at Bishops Cannings, Wiltshire. He was succeeded by his grandson, Sir Walter Ernle (1672–1690), 2nd Baronet, of Maddington, Wiltshire, who was, in turn, succeeded at his own death by his younger brother, Sir Edward Ernle (1673–1728/9), 3rd Baronet, P.C., MP. The third Baronet was succeeded by a kinsman, Sir Walter Ernle (1676–1732), 4th Baronet, of Conock, in the parish of Chirton, Wiltshire, who died childless, and was succeeded by his younger brother, the Reverend Sir John Ernle (circa 1680/1–1734), 5th Baronet, Rector of All Cannings, Wiltshire, who was predeceased by his only son.

== Ernle baronets, of Etchilhampton (1660) ==
- Sir Walter Ernle, 1st Baronet (c. 1628–1682)
- Sir Walter Ernle, 2nd Baronet (c. 1671–1690)
- Sir Edward Ernle, 3rd Baronet (c. 1673–1729)
- Sir Walter Ernle, 4th Baronet (1676–1732)
- Sir John Ernle, 5th Baronet (c. 1681–1734). The baronetcy was extinct at his death. The titles below were self-styled.
- Sir Michael Ernle, styled 6th Baronet (d. 1771)
- The Rev. Sir Edward Ernle, styled 7th Baronet (d. 1787)

Michael Ernle (circa 1704–1771) was a grandson of the first Baronet's younger brother Michael. He also died without issue. The claim was then continued his younger brother, The Reverend Sir Edward Ernle (circa 1711/2–1787).

== Extended family ==
The estates of the family passed through female lines of descendants, and the surname Ernle, pronounced Earnley, after the Sussex parish from which it derived, forms part of the orotund surname, Plunkett-Ernle-Erle-Drax, borne by Admiral Sir Reginald Aylmer Ranfurly Plunkett-Ernle-Erle-Drax (1880–1967), younger son of the 17th Lord Dunsany whose wife, Ernle Elizabeth Louisa Mary Grosvenor Ernle-Erle-Drax, née Burton, was the eventual heiress of the senior line of the Wiltshire Ernle family.
