= Erneley =

Erneley is a variant of the surname more commonly found as Ernle. This variant was employed by some of the Ernle baronets, and was perhaps the preferred, but not exclusive, form of the name in the 18th century.

- John Erneley (before 1522–1572), MP
- William Erneley (1501–1546), MP
