= Nathaniel Gould (died 1738) =

English financier and politician

Nathaniel Gould (c. 1697–1738), of Crosby Square, London, was an English financier and politician who sat in the House of Commons from 1729 to 1734.

Gould was the second son of John Gould of Woodford, Essex. He was a Director of the Bank of England between 1722 and 1737, with statutory intervals.

Gould was returned as Member of Parliament for Wareham at a by-election on 12 February 1729. He consistently supported the administration. He was a member of Samuel Holden's dissenting deputies committee who discussed the repeal of the Test and Corporation Acts with Walpole in November 1732 and December 1734. He lost his seat at the 1734 British general election, and did not stand again.

Gould married Jane Thayer, daughter of Humphrey Thayer of Hatton Garden, London, in November 1734. In 1737 he became deputy governor of the Bank of England. He died without issue on 30 March 1738.

Parliament of Great Britain
| Preceded by Sir Edward Ernle; Joseph Gascoigne | Member of Parliament for Wareham; 1729–1734; With: Sir Edward Ernle; Thomas Tower 1729 | Succeeded by Henry Drax; John Pitt |
