= Joseph Gascoigne =

English politician

Joseph Gascoigne (died 1728) of Chiswick, Middlesex, and Weybridge, Surrey, was an English politician who sat in the House of Commons from 1722 to 1728.

Gascoigne may have been related to Joseph Gascoigne (died 1685), chandler, of Chiswick, and Benjamin Gascoigne (died 1731), also of Chiswick, who was father of Joseph Gascoigne and Sir Crisp Gascoigne, Lord Mayor of London in 1752.

Gascoigne was agent victualler for Port Mahon in 1709 and became Receiver-general in Minorca from 1712 until his death. At the 1722 general election he stood as a government supporter and was elected Member of Parliament for Wareham where he had no prior connection. He was again successful at the 1727 general election. There is no record of his speaking or voting in Parliament

Gascoigne was living at Weybridge, Surrey, in June 1725, when he received a grant of arms. He died on 1 September 1728, leaving two daughters, Aline and Theodosia, to whom administration was granted.

Parliament of Great Britain
Preceded by George Pitt, Henry Drax	Member of Parliament for Wareham; 1722–1728; With: Sir Edward Ernle	Succeeded by Sir Edward Ernle; Nathaniel Gould
