= Sir Edward Ernle, 3rd Baronet =

English Whig politician

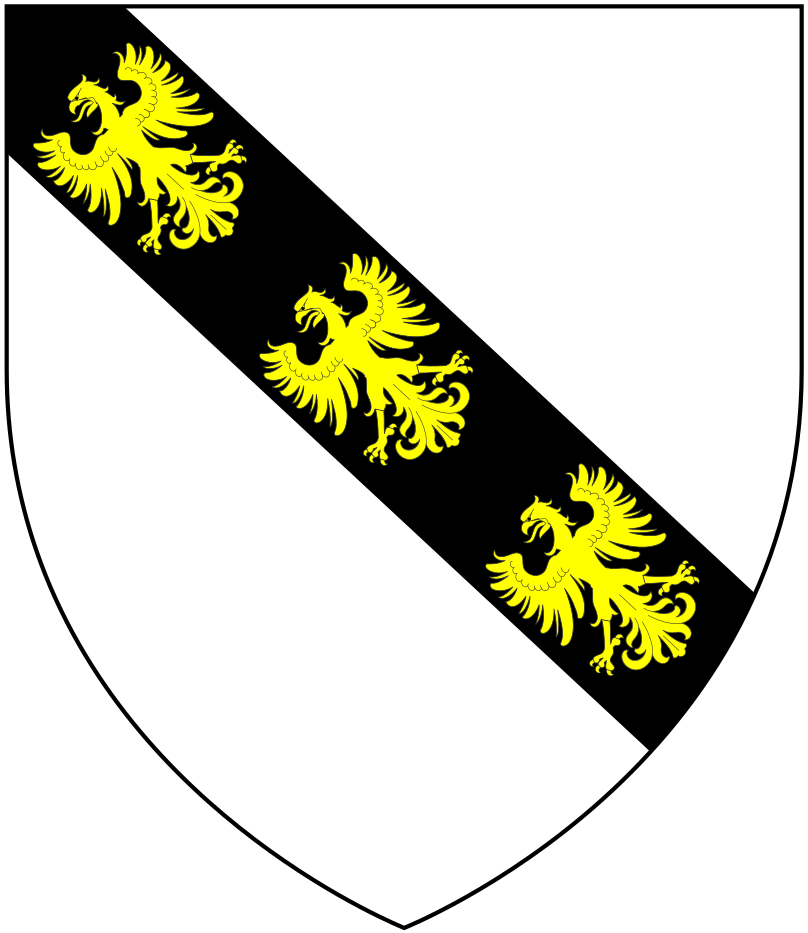
Arms of Ernle: Argent, on a bend sable three eagles displayed or

Sir Edward Ernle, 3rd Baronet (c. 1673 – 1729) of Charborough in Dorset, of Brimslade Park and Etchilhampton, both in Wiltshire, was an English Whig politician who sat in the English and British House of Commons between 1695 and 1729. He had mixed fortunes in finding or holding a seat and often depended on his father-in-law to bring him into his own seat at Wareham when a vacancy arose.

== Early life ==
Ernle was a younger son of Edward Ernle of Ashlington and Etchilhampton in Wiltshire (the eldest son and heir apparent of Sir Walter Ernle, 1st Baronet (c. 1628–1682)) and his wife Anne Ashe, a daughter of Edward Ashe, MP, of Heytesbury, Wiltshire. Both his grandfathers were Members of Parliament. In 1690, he succeeded his brother, Walter, in the baronetcy. He married Frances Erle, the daughter and sole-heiress of General Thomas Erle (1650–1720), MP, of Charborough House, Dorset, by 1698 when he became a Whig.

== Career ==
At the 1695 English general election, Ernle was returned as Member of Parliament for Devizes on his own interest. At the 1698 English general election he was returned unopposed as Whig MP for Wiltshire. He did not stand at the first general election of 1701, but it became a practice for him to be returned by his father in law as MP for Wareham at by-elections, and he was returned there for the first time on 5 March 1701. At the second general election on 1701, he was returned unopposed as MP for Heytesbury. He failed to find a seat at the 1702 English general election but was returned as MP for Wareham at a by-election on 22 February 1704. At the 1705 English general election he stood again for Wiltshire, but was defeated and no further opportunity at Wareham occurred. He was invited to stand for Marlborough at the 1708 British general election, but was dropped before the poll. He was then returned there as MP there at a contested by-election on 10 December 1708. He voted for naturalizing the Palatines in 1709 and for the impeachment of Dr Sacheverell in 1710. He could not find a seat in 1710, but was returned as MP for Wareham at a by-election on 13 December 1710. He did not stand at the 1713 British general election.

At the 1715 British general election Ernle was returned by his father-in-law as MP for Portsmouth. He voted for the septennial bill in 1716, but went into opposition with Walpole in 1717. He voted against the repeal of the Occasional Conformity and Schism Acts and the Peerage Bill in 1719. In 1720, on the death of his father-in-law, he inherited the electoral interest at Wareham, and returned himself as MP for Wareham in 1722 and 1727.

== Death and succession ==
Ernle died on 31 January 1729, leaving two daughters. Without male progeny, he was succeeded in the baronetcy by his kinsman Sir Walter Ernle, 4th Baronet (1676–1732) of Chirton, Wiltshire.

Parliament of England
Preceded by John Methuen; Walter Grubbe	Member of Parliament for Devizes; 1695–1698; With: John Methuen	Succeeded by John Methuen; Sir Francis Child
Preceded by Sir George Hungerford; Henry St John	Member of Parliament for Wiltshire; 1698–1701; With: Sir George Hungerford	Succeeded by Sir George Hungerford; Richard Howe
Preceded by George Pitt; Thomas Erle	Member of Parliament for Wareham; 1701; With: George Pitt	Succeeded by George Pitt; Thomas Erle
Preceded by Edward Ashe; William Ashe	Member of Parliament for Heytesbury; 1701–1702; With: Edward Ashe	Succeeded by Edward Ashe; William Monson
Preceded by Thomas Erle; Sir Josiah Child	Member of Parliament for Wareham; 1704–1705; With: Thomas Erle	Succeeded by Thomas Erle; George Pitt
Parliament of Great Britain
Preceded by Earl of Hertford; Hon. James Bruce	Member of Parliament for Marlborough; 1708–1710; With: Hon. James Bruce	Succeeded by Lord Bruce; Hon. Robert Bruce
Preceded by George Pitt; Thomas Erle	Member of Parliament for Wareham; 1710–1713; With: Thomas Erle	Succeeded by George Pitt; Thomas Erle
Preceded by Admiral Sir James Wishart; Sir Thomas Mackworth, Bt	Member of Parliament for Portsmouth; 1715–1722; With: Sir Charles Wager	Succeeded by Sir Charles Wager; Sir John Norris
Preceded by George Pitt, junior Henry Drax	Member of Parliament for Wareham; 1722–1729; With: Joseph Gascoigne; Nathaniel Gould	Succeeded by Thomas Tower; Nathaniel Gould
Baronetage of England
Preceded by Walter Ernle	Baronet of Etchilhampton; 1690–1729	Succeeded by Walter Ernle
