= Richard Drax =

British politician (born 1958)

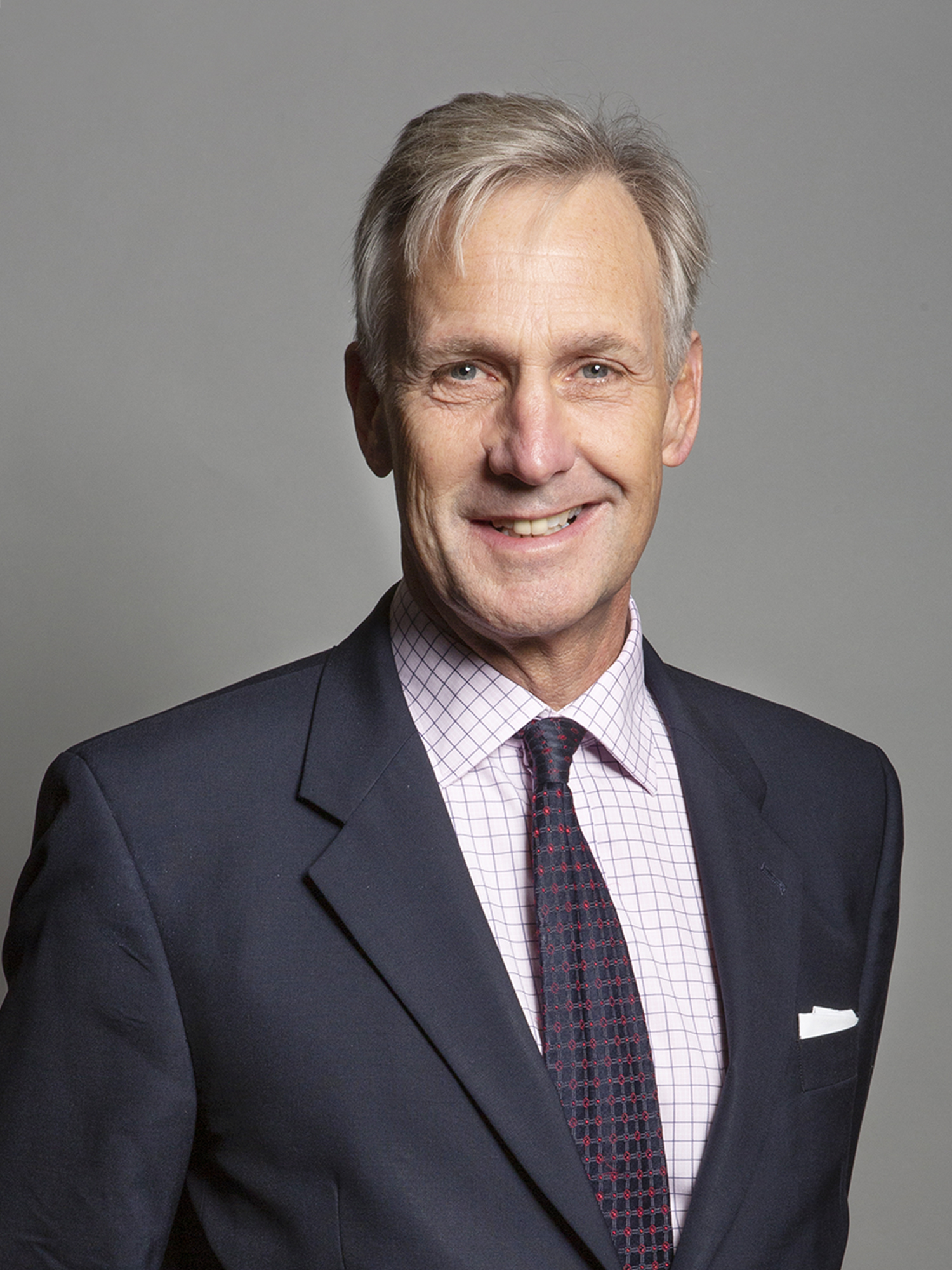
- Official portrait, 2019

Member of Parliament for South Dorset
- In office 6 May 2010 – 30 May 2024
- Preceded by: Jim Knight
- Succeeded by: Lloyd Hatton

Personal details
- Born: Richard Grosvenor Plunkett-Ernle-Erle-Drax; 29 January 1958 (age 68) London, England
- Party: Conservative
- Spouses: Zara Legge-Bourke (m. 1985; div. 1997) Eliza S Dugdale (m. 1998, divorced): Elsebet Bødtker
- Children: 4
- Education: Harrow School
- Alma mater: Royal Agricultural College; Royal Military Academy Sandhurst
- Profession: Army officer; journalist
- Military career
- Allegiance: United Kingdom
- Branch: British Army
- Service years: 1978–1987
- Rank: Captain
- Service number: 506831
- Unit: Coldstream Guards

Richard Grosvenor Plunkett-Ernle-Erle-Drax (born 29 January 1958) is a British Conservative Party politician, landowner, journalist, and former Member of Parliament (MP) for South Dorset between 2010 and 2024.

== Early life and education ==
Richard Drax was born on 29 January 1958 in Westminster, London, into the Drax family. He was privately educated at Harrow School before going to the Royal Agricultural College in Cirencester, where he graduated with a diploma in rural land management in 1990, receiving a further diploma in journalism in 1995.

== Career ==
=== Military service ===
Drax passed out from the Royal Military Academy Sandhurst and was commissioned in the British Army joining the Coldstream Guards on 9 December 1978 as a second lieutenant. Drax was promoted to lieutenant on 9 December 1980, before being transferred to the Regular Army Reserve of Officers after active service on 9 December 1983, ending his first period of full-time military service.

Drax was reinstated on the Active List on 10 September 1984, beginning his second and final period of regular service. He retained the rank of lieutenant with seniority from 10 September 1981 to reflect the three years he had served. He was promoted to captain on 10 March 1986.

He relinquished his British Army commission on 9 September 1987, thereby retiring after nine years' service as a Coldstreamer.

=== Journalism ===
Drax worked at York's Evening Press as a reporter in 1991, before joining BBC South, where he appeared on both radio and television media, including the daily television news programme South Today.

=== Parliamentary career ===
Drax was selected as a Conservative prospective parliamentary candidate in July 2006. In 2009, Drax faced criticism from political rivals for "hiding his aristocratic roots" by not using his full quadruple-barrelled name. It was suggested the then leader of the Conservative Party, David Cameron, had asked wealthy Conservative candidates to shorten their names to appear more in touch with normal people. Drax denied the accusations, saying that he used the shortened version of his name only because of the "logistic mouthful", while Cameron's comments were a "throw away joke".

At the 2010 general election, Drax was elected as MP for South Dorset with 45.1% of the vote and a majority of 7,443. He was re-elected as MP for South Dorset at the 2015 general election with an increased vote share of 48.7% and an increased majority of 11,994.

In the House of Commons he has sat on the Environment, Food and Rural Affairs Committee and served on the European Scrutiny Committee.

Drax campaigned for Brexit during the 2016 referendum.

At the snap 2017 general election, Drax was again re-elected, with an increased vote share of 56.1% and a decreased majority of 11,695.

In April 2019, in a speech in the House of Commons, Drax said that he "made the wrong call" by supporting the government's Brexit deal and called for the resignation of Theresa May if she failed to take the UK out of the European Union (EU) by 12 April. Drax praised May's successor, Boris Johnson, for achieving a trade deal in December 2020, but in February 2021 expressed concern over the Northern Ireland Protocol and disruption to trade in Northern Ireland.

During the 2019 general election campaign, Drax apologised after his Land Rover, with a campaign poster on the vehicle, was photographed parking across two disabled parking spaces outside his campaign headquarters. Drax responded to the incident by saying: "I popped in to get some literature and very thoughtlessly parked on those lines which I immediately regretted and apologise to the organisation straight away. I rushed in and rushed out. I've never done it before and never done it since but it was a real moment of thoughtlessness and it won't happen again." He was again re-elected at the 2019 general election, with an increased vote share of 58.8% and an increased majority of 17,153.

In June 2020, Drax wrote an article in the Dorset Echo suggesting that rioters linked to the Black Lives Matter protests had been responsible for desecrating The Cenotaph war memorial in London.

In May 2022, Drax criticised the decision by Chancellor of the Exchequer Rishi Sunak to introduce a windfall tax on oil and gas firms to fund economic support for the public during the cost-of-living crisis, accusing him of "throwing red meat to socialists".

Drax endorsed Suella Braverman during the July 2022 Conservative Party leadership election. After Braverman was eliminated, he supported Liz Truss.

He endorsed Boris Johnson in the October 2022 Conservative Party leadership election. Drax voted against the Windsor Framework.

In March 2024, Drax was criticised by wildlife charities after he called for the culling of animals, such as deer and foxes, to control their numbers.

In the 2024 United Kingdom general election, Drax lost his 17,153 (33.6%) majority to Labour candidate Lloyd Hatton.

== Family ==
Arms of Drax of Charborough Park

Drax lives in his family's ancestral seat, Charborough House – a Grade I listed manor house in rural Dorset. He is the largest individual landowner in Dorset, owning approximately 13,870 acres (5,610 ha), equivalent to 2% of the land in Dorset. He also owns the 2,200-acre (890 ha) Ellerton Abbey farming estate in Swaledale, North Yorkshire, and the nearby 520-acre (210 ha) Copperthwaite Allotment grouse moor.

Drax is the eldest son of Henry Walter Plunkett-Ernle-Erle-Drax (1928–2017) and The Hon. Pamela Weeks (1931–2019) and a grandson of Admiral The Hon. Sir Reginald Drax, younger son of the 17th Lord Dunsany thereby being a member of the Barony of Dunsany. His great-uncle was the writer and playwright the 18th Lord Dunsany, and a cousin of his is the 21st and present Lord Dunsany.

His first wife was Zara Legge-Bourke, younger sister of the royal nanny Tiggy Legge-Bourke, relations of the Earl of Dartmouth. They divorced in 1997. Drax married his second wife; Eliza, daughter of Commander James Dugdale, in 1998. Drax since married his third wife, Norwegian-born Elsebet Bødtker, and has four children in total.

At least six of his ancestors, including John Samuel Wanley Sawbridge Erle-Drax and the 17th Lord Dunsany, were Members of Parliament for Dorset and Gloucestershire between the 1680s and 1880s.

=== Family links to historical slavery ===
A 2020 investigation by The Guardian found that Richard Drax still owns and grows sugar on the same Drax Hall Estate in Barbados that made the family's fortune. Over 200 years, 30,000 slaves died at this and the other Drax plantations, according to Professor Sir Hilary Beckles, Chair of CARICOM's Reparations Commission, who has said: "The Drax family has done more harm and violence to the black people of Barbados than any other."

In 2023, the Barbados Government announced it was seeking reparations from Drax for his ancestors' involvement in slavery. The Reparations Commission wanted Drax Hall to be returned to Barbados, to be made into a museum. However, in 2024, the case was dropped due to public opposition to the proposed purchase.

In 2025, Paul Lashmar published the book Drax of Drax Hall: How One British Family Got Rich (and Stayed Rich) from Sugar and Slavery, with an introduction by David Olusoga.

== See also ==
- Baron of Dunsany
- Baron Plunket

Parliament of the United Kingdom
Preceded by Jim Knight	Member of Parliament for South Dorset; 2010–2024	Succeeded by Lloyd Hatton
