= George Pitt (died 1745) =

English landowner and Tory politician

George Pitt (died 1745) of Shroton, Dorset, and Strathfieldsaye, Hampshire, was an English landowner and Tory politician who sat in the House of Commons between 1715 and 1727.

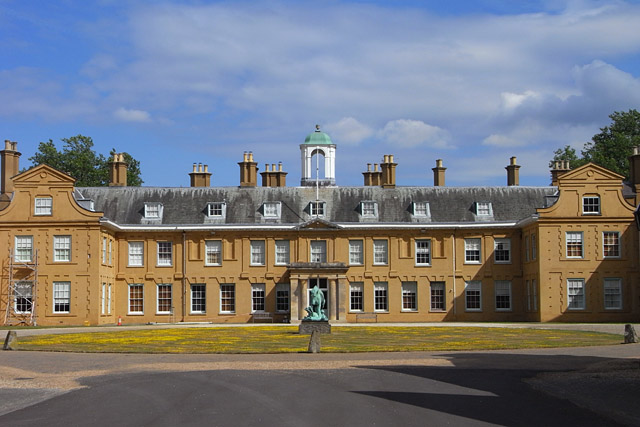
Stratfield Saye House

Pitt was born after 1691, the eldest son of George Pitt of Strathfieldsaye, Hampshire, and his first wife Lucy Pile, daughter of Thomas Pile of Baverstock, Wiltshire, and Shroton, Dorset. By 1721, he had married Mary Louisa Bernier, daughter of John Bernier of Strasbourg, in Alsace. His mother had died on 17 November 1697 and in 1714 he succeeded to the Dorset estates of his maternal grandfather.

Pitt was returned as a Tory Member of Parliament for Wareham on his family interest at a by-election on 18 April 1715 after his father, elected at the 1715 British general election, chose to sit for Hampshire instead. Like his father, he refused to sign the Loyal Association in December 1715. He voted against the Septennial Bill in 1716, but was absent from the divisions on the repeal of the Occasional Conformity and Schism Acts and the Peerage Bill in 1719. At the 1722 British general election, he lost his seat at Wareham. He appears to have changed sides as he defeated the Tory, Thomas Horner, at a by-election for Dorset on 25 January 1727, with the help of Bubb Dodington, who described him as "scarcely capable". Before the general election later in the year, Richard Edgcumbe reported to Walpole that Pitt had changed sides again and Pitt did not stand at the election.

Pitt separated from his wife according to a petition of his brother-in-law, Henry Bernier, supported by an affidavit of Mary Louisa Pitt, dated 21 March 1730. It claimed she "was forcibly abducted from London by her husband,... and kept locked up at ... at Melcombe, in Dorset". Pitt succeeded his father at Strathfieldsaye in 1735. He died in October 1745 leaving four sons and two daughters.

Parliament of Great Britain
Preceded by George Pitt; Thomas Erle	Member of Parliament for Wareham; 1715–1722; With: Thomas Erle; Henry Drax	Succeeded by Sir Edward Ernle; Joseph Gascoigne
Preceded by George Chafin; Thomas Strangways	Member of Parliament for Dorset; 1727; With: George Chafin	Succeeded by George Chafin; Edmund Morton Pleydell
