= All Cannings =

Village in Wiltshire, England

Coordinates: 51.354°N 01.901°W

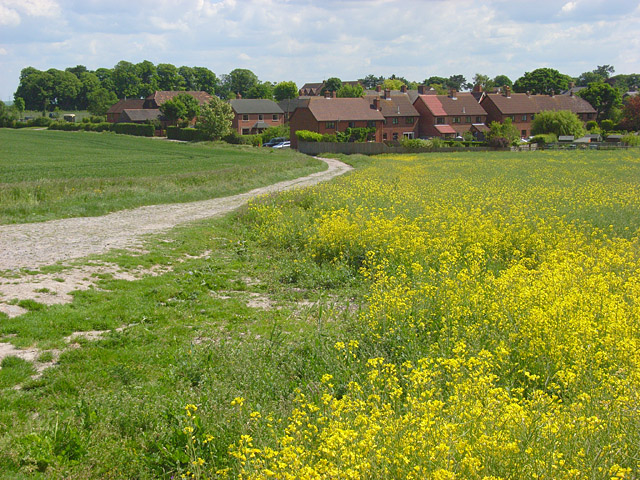
- The edge of All Cannings

- Location within Wiltshire
- Population: 649 (in 2011)
- OS grid reference: SU070617
- Civil parish: All Cannings
- Unitary authority: Wiltshire
- Ceremonial county: Wiltshire
- Region: South West
- Country: England
- Sovereign state: United Kingdom
- Post town: Devizes
- Postcode district: SN10
- Dialling code: 01380
- Police: Wiltshire
- Fire: Dorset and Wiltshire
- Ambulance: South Western
- UK Parliament: East Wiltshire
- Website: Parish Council

All Cannings (pronounced "Allcannings") is a village and civil parish in the English county of Wiltshire, about 4 miles (6 km) east of Devizes. The parish includes the nearby smaller settlement of Allington. In 2011 the parish had a population of 649.

The southern part of the parish lies in the Vale of Pewsey, and in the north the parish extends some 3 miles (5 km) onto the Marlborough Downs and includes Tan Hill, which is (by a small margin) the second highest hill in Wiltshire. Etchilhampton Water, a tributary of the River Avon, forms part of the southern boundary of the parish. Moor Brook flows south through Allington and All Cannings villages to join it.

== History ==
Prehistoric sites in the north of the present parish include Rybury Camp, a Neolithic causewayed enclosure overlaid by a late Bronze Age or early Iron Age hillfort, occupying some 2 hectares on a prominent ridge near Tan Hill. All Cannings Cross is an Iron Age site further south, which was investigated by Ben and Maud Cunnington from 1911; they made important finds of pottery. The Wansdyke earthwork crosses the parish in the far north.

The name is believed to be a derivation of "Old Canning". The name Cannings derives from the Old English Canaingas meaning 'Cana's people'. A village probably existed on the current site by the tenth century, as the invading Danes at that time referred to Canning marsh.

In 1086, Domesday Book recorded land held by St Mary's Abbey, Winchester at Caninge, with 58 households and a mill; and land held by Amesbury Abbey at Allentone, with 32 households.

There was a church from early in the 13th century and the earliest features in the current Church of England parish church are late Norman. By the 14th century the village had a water mill, but this had disappeared by the 18th century. In 1499, the Winchester abbey was granted the right to hold an annual fair near Wansdyke on Tan Hill (at the time known as Charlborough Down) which became a large sheep and horse fair, with amusements including horse racing. The fair continued to be held until World War II.

The Wiltshire Victoria County History traces the ownership of All Cannings manor from 1536, when it was granted to Edward Seymour, later Duke of Somerset. The land was sold as separate farms from 1909. Allington was held alongside Lydiard Tregoze until 1300, when it was allotted to John la Warr, 2nd Baron De La Warr (d.1347). Again the Victoria County History has the later owners, culminating in breakup and sale in 1907.

The Kennet and Avon Canal was built across the parish, passing just north of the village, and opened in 1810. The parish population peaked in the middle of the 19th century with the 1841 census showing 663 inhabitants.

The ancient parish had three tithings, All Cannings being the largest. Allington, a narrow strip to the west, was deemed a separate civil parish in 1881 and was united with All Cannings parish in 1934; its population in 1931 was 70. The third tithing was Fullaway (or Fullway), a small detached part between Stert and Urchfont, which was made a civil parish in 1857 and annexed to Stert parish in 1894, having a population around that time of 11.

== Religious sites ==
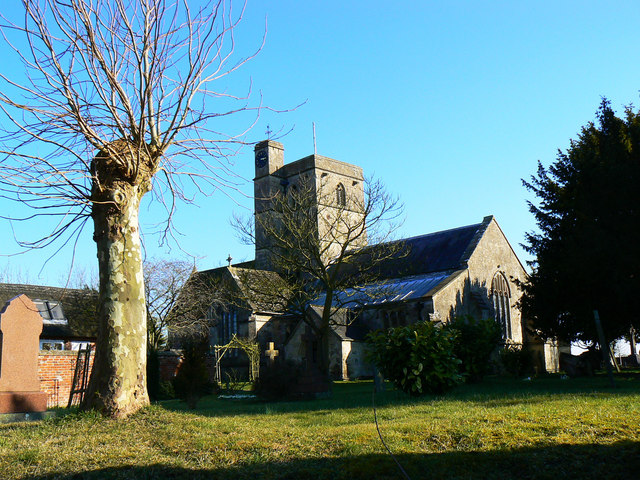
All Cannings Church from the northwest

=== Parish church ===
The Church of England parish church of All Saints (St Anne until c.1928), which stands at the south end of the village, took its present form in the 14th and 15th centuries and was restored in the 19th. It is a Grade II* listed building.

The church has a cruciform plan, which may reflect a Norman church on the same site; when the crossing was rebuilt in the 14th century, two short 12th-century columns and capitals were reused. The nave was re-roofed in 1638 and renewed in 1843. The chancel was rebuilt in 1678 and again in 1868–9, this time in Bath stone on a slightly narrower plan, to designs of Henry Weaver of Devizes. The elaborate interior decoration of the chancel is described by Historic England as Tractarian, with marble shafts decorating the four pairs of side windows, and an alabaster reredos with a relief of the Last Supper.

The three-stage central tower is mid-15th century and probably replaced an earlier one. It has a square stair-tower at its northeast corner, with a clock face on its north side. The Beauchamp Chapel, east of the south transept, is a chantry probably built by Richard Beauchamp, 6th Baron Amand (died 1508).

The carved stone font is 15th-century, and its tall wooden cover is dated 1633. Monuments in the church include, at the west end of the south aisle, a large pedimented tablet to William Ernle (died 1581) of Etchilhampton and his wife Jone; and at the same end of the north aisle, to Sir John Ernle, 5th baronet (died 1734) – who was rector from 1709 – and his wife Elizabeth. Among the peal of six bells, two were cast by Roger Purdue of Salisbury bell foundry in 1626 and one by Thomas Rudhall in 1771.

The parish war memorial, a stone wheel-head cross unveiled in 1920, stands in the churchyard by its main entrance.

St Andrew's church at Etchilhampton, built in the 14th century, was always a chapelry of All Cannings, and the parish became known as All Cannings with Etchilhampton. The benefice was united with Bishop's Cannings in 1977 and today the All Cannings and Etchilhampton churches are part of the Cannings and Redhorn group. Parish registers from 1578 are held in the Wiltshire and Swindon History Centre, Chippenham.

=== Others ===
There was a church at Allington before 1100 but it fell into disuse, possibly in the 14th century.

Bethel Strict Baptist chapel opened at Allington in 1828 and is still in use. A Wesleyan Methodist chapel was registered in 1890 and closed sometime before 1959.

== Modern long barrow ==
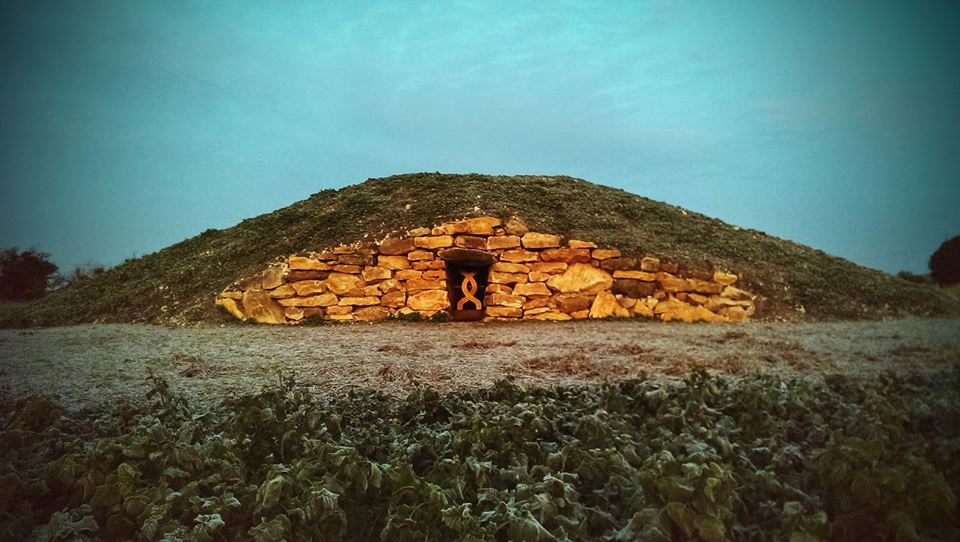
Exterior and entrance to the new barrow

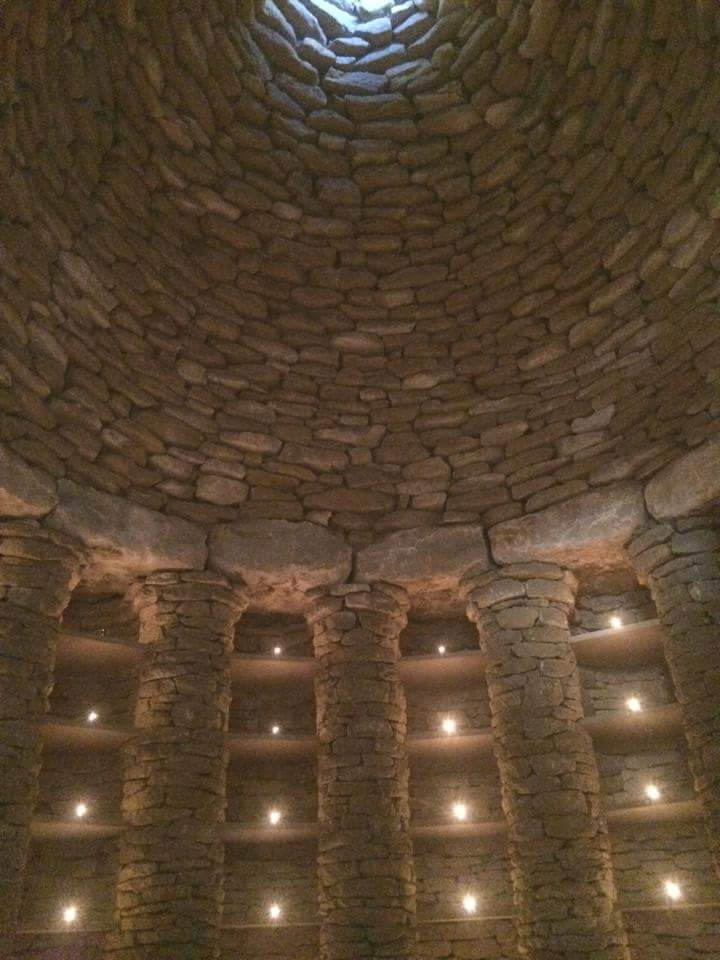
Inside one of the chambers

The Modern Long Barrow at All Cannings

In 2015 the first long barrow in thousands of years, inspired by those built in the New Stone Age, was built on land just outside the village. The project was instigated by Tim Daw, a local farmer and a steward at Stonehenge.

The barrow was designed to have a large number of private niches within the stone and earth structure, to receive cremation urns. The structure received significant media attention as it was being built, and was fully subscribed within eighteen months.

== Notable buildings ==
All Cannings village has several groups of cottages, mostly thatched, the oldest bearing a 1647 datestone.

Rustic Farmhouse is a timber-framed house under a thatched roof, from the late 16th century. Cliff Farmhouse is another timber-framed house from the late 16th century or early 17th, originally T in plan but now L, partly rebuilt.

The former rectory, close to the church, was rebuilt in the mid-17th century and extended in the early and late 19th; the older core has a sarsen lower floor and brick upper, and limestone dressings. It was sold in 1969.

== Education ==
All Cannings had a Sunday school by 1808 and a day-school by 1818. 100 pupils were enrolled in the day-school but attendance was much less as many of the children worked in the fields during the week.

By 1833 the village had two day-schools: the parish school with 105 pupils and a private school with 12 pupils. The Rector had the parish school built that year on land given by the Lord of the Manor, Alexander Baring.

The private school had closed by 1858. The parish school was reorganised in 1961 and moved into a new building in 2000.

== Rock Against Cancer concerts ==
The Kings Arms public house hosts an annual "Rock Against Cancer" event called Concert at the Kings. Artists at the 2012 event included:

- Bob Harris (compere)
- Mike and the Mechanics
- Brian May
- Kerry Ellis
- Madeline Bell
- Midge Ure
- Tom Robinson
- Chris Thompson
- Patti Russo
- The Sweet
- Strawbs

== Early concrete housing ==
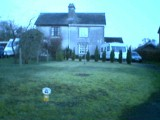
The concrete house

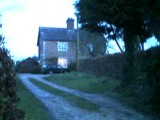
The brick "template" house next door

In 1868 Francis Baring, 3rd Baron Ashburton, and his tenant farmer Simon Hiscock decided to each build a pair of semi-detached workers cottages. They had two adjacent plots of the same size. The tenant built his pair of brick, his Lordship of concrete – the only major difference is that, in the absence of internal shuttering, the concrete chimneys are straight rather than bent to combine into a single chimney stack.

Both pairs of cottages still stand largely unaltered, although one of the concrete houses had an extension added in June 2006.

It is assumed that this was a trial into the efficacy of using shuttered reinforced concrete as a building method. It seems to have been successful as two more pairs were then built, followed by a more elaborate villa style pair of cottages and finally a large farmhouse. This experiment is little acknowledged outside the area. While these houses may not be the very first concrete houses built, they were built within a couple of years of the first one.

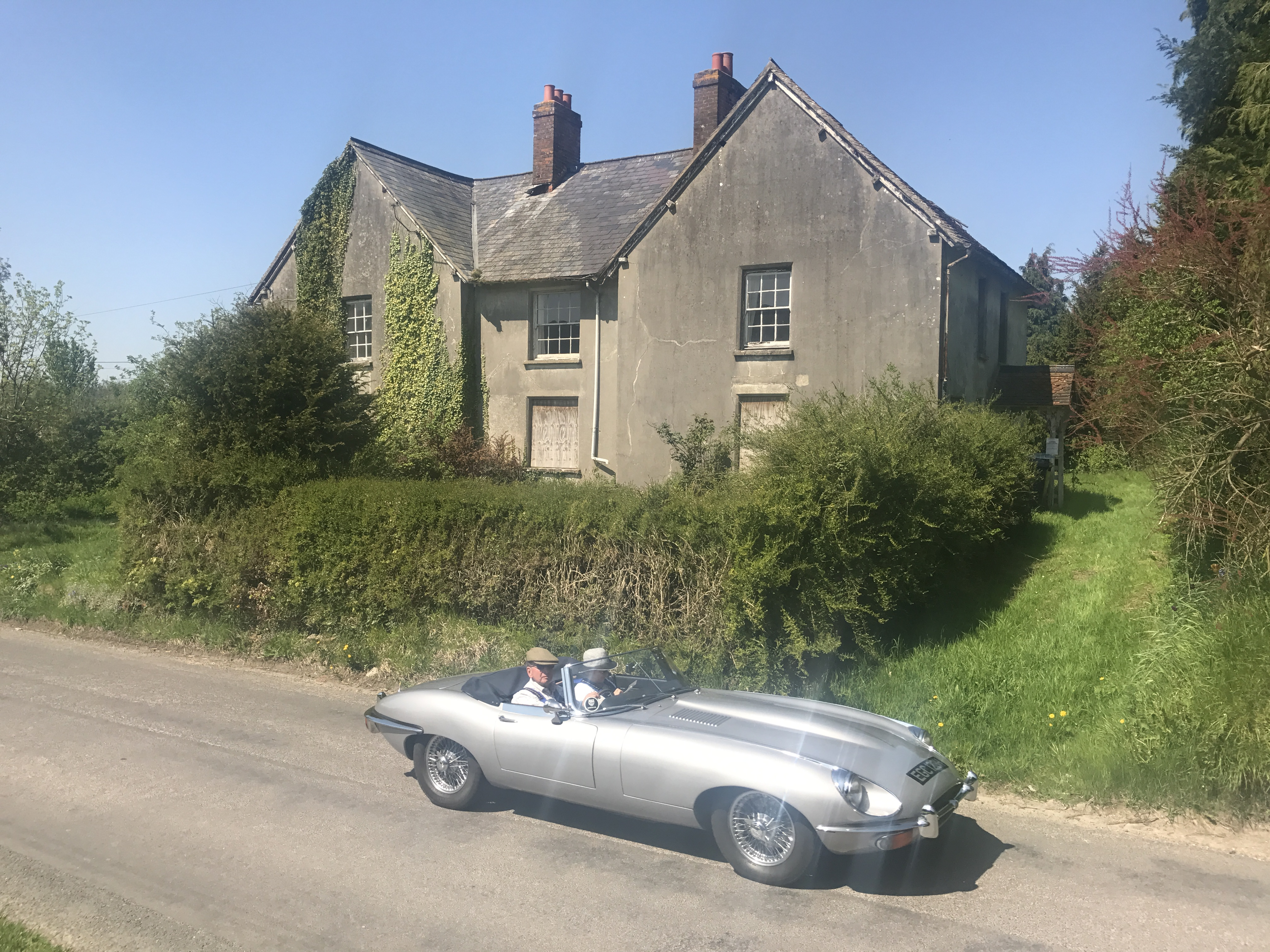
Comparable rare and pioneering concrete dwellings built before 1873 at Old Burghclere, Hampshire for the 4th Earl of Carnarvon

== Notable people ==
- David Curwen (1913–2011) built miniature railway steam locomotives at All Cannings.
- Andy Scott (born 30 June 1949), guitarist with band The Sweet, and as of June 2020, the last surviving member of their 'classic lineup', lives in a converted barn at the village.

== Sources and further reading ==
- Pevsner, Nikolaus; Cherry, Bridget (revision) (1975) [1963]. The Buildings of England: Wiltshire. Harmondsworth: Penguin Books. pp. 85–86. ISBN 0140710264.
