= Finnemore =

Finnemore is a surname. Notable people with the surname include:

- Martha Finnemore (born 1959), American constructivist scholar of international relations
- John Finnemore (born 1977), British comedy writer and actor
- John Finnemore (born 1863) (1863–1915), British author
- Joseph Finnemore (1860–1939), British book and magazine illustrator
