= John Plunkett, 17th Baron of Dunsany =

Anglo-Irish peer, landowner and politician

John William Plunkett, 17th Baron of Dunsany (31 August 1853 – 16 January 1899) was an Anglo-Irish Conservative politician and peer.

== Early life and career ==
Plunkett was the second son of Edward Plunkett, 16th Baron of Dunsany, and Anne Constance Dutton, daughter of John Dutton, 2nd Baron Sherborne and Mary Bilson-Legge, daughter of Henry Bilson-Legge, 2nd Baron Stawell and Mary Curzon. His father pursued military interests, and wrote on the topic of a Channel Tunnel to France. His elder brother, Randal Edward Sherborne Plunkett, predeceased him.

John William Plunkett received a Bachelor of Arts degree from Trinity College Dublin (1877). He studied at Trinity College, Cambridge (B.A., 1878; M.A., 1881). He was Lieutenant R.N. Artillery Volunteers and a Conservative Party Member of Parliament for the Thornbury (or Southern) division of Gloucestershire from 1886 to 1892. He proved his right to vote at the elections of Representative Peers (Ireland) 1890 and Representative Peers (Ireland) 1893–99.

== Family ==
John William married on 3 April 1877, at St George's, Hanover Square, London, England, his second cousin, Ernle Elizabeth Louisa Maria Grosvenor Burton (later, in 1906, by Royal Licence, Plunkett-Ernle-Erle-Drax), the only daughter and heir to Colonel Francis Augustus Plunkett Burton, Coldstream Guards, by Sarah Elizabeth, younger daughter and coheir of John Samuel Wanley Sawbridge-Erle-Drax, of Charborough Park, Dorset. Ernle Burton's paternal grandmother, Anna Maria Plunkett, wife of Admiral James Ryder Burton, was a sister of her husband's paternal grandfather, Edward Plunkett, 14th Baron Dunsany. In addition, Ernle, Lady Dunsany, was descended via her maternal line from James Drax, a young Englishman who, with a few hundred pounds, had sailed from the Port of London for Barbados in the late 1620s. There he had made a fortune developing sugar and slave-trading into a hugely profitable business. Just before the turn of the seventeenth century, the family returned to England and purchased an estate in Dorset. Lady Dunsany inherited Charborough Park in 1905. Her unusual Christian name, Ernle, was inherited from an ancestress, Elizabeth Ernle (1697–1759), wife of Henry Drax, Esq., who was the daughter and eventual heiress of Sir Edward Ernle, 3rd Baronet, P.C., M.P., (1673–1729) of Maddington, Wiltshire, by his wife, Frances (d. 1728) only daughter and heir of Lieutenant General Thomas Erle (1650–1720), of Charborough House, the source of a further barrel of her surname.

John William and Ernle Elizabeth had two sons, the author Edward John Moreton Drax, 18th Baron of Dunsany and Admiral Sir Reginald Aylmer Ranfurly Plunkett-Ernle-Erle-Drax (Charborough Park was left to Reginald, who changed his name to include Drax, the family who had formerly owned it, as well as including references to the Ernle and Erle families from which various of his mother's legacies to him came).

Lady Dunsany was a cousin of Sir Richard Burton, the great traveller, scholar, writer, and translator of the Arabian Nights. Her son and heir, Edward, the noted author, may have inherited his imaginative streak partly from the Burton family.

== Personal life ==
He lived at the family seat of Dunsany Castle, County Meath, Ireland, and in London and Shoreham, Kent. He was an exceptional sportsman, and was reputed to have been the best marksman in England. He was deeply interested in mechanical things and developed his own X-ray machine, which was in operation in Dunsany Castle before his death in 1899. The Dunsany version of the Röntgen ray machine was given to Sevenoaks Hospital in 1918. He had acquired the right to drive the Irish Mail Train and regularly took charge of the branch line train from Dublin to Drumree, near Dunsany. He was also responsible for having the first Irish telephone system installed in Dunsany Castle.

The 17th Baron of Dunsany died, after a short illness, on 16 January 1899, at Dunsany Castle, aged forty-five years. His widow, from whom he was separated in his last years, and who, by Royal Licence of 20 December 1905, assumed the names of Plunkett-Ernle-Erle-Drax, died at her residence, Dunstall Priory, Shoreham, near Sevenoaks, Kent, England, on 28 February 1916.

== Sources ==
- Source: "The Story of Dunsany Castle," by Malachy Lynch and Mary-Rose Carty, pp. 50-51

Parliament of the United Kingdom
Preceded by Stafford Howard	Member of Parliament for Thornbury; 1886–1892	Succeeded by Charles Colston
Political offices
Preceded by The Lord Dunsandle and Clanconal	Representative peer for Ireland; 1893–1899	Succeeded by The Earl of Drogheda
Peerage of Ireland
Preceded by Edward Plunkett	Baron of Dunsany; 1889–1899	Succeeded by Edward Plunkett
