= Etchilhampton =

Village in Wiltshire, England

Coordinates: 51°20′31″N 1°56′06″W

- Village and civil parish
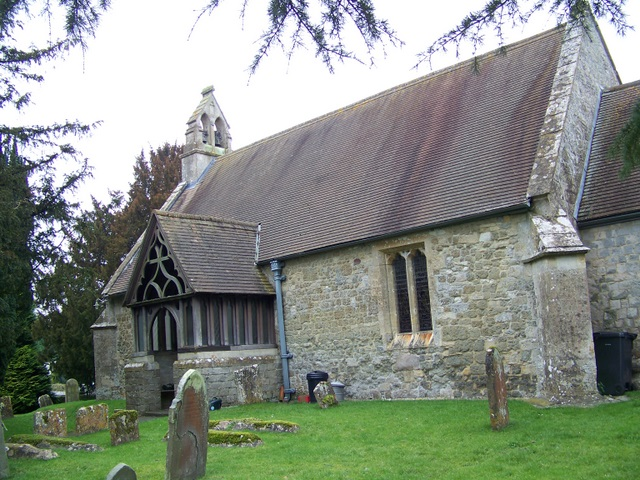
- St Andrew's Church, Etchilhampton

- Location within Wiltshire
- Population: 142 (in 2011)
- OS grid reference: SU046603
- Civil parish: Etchilhampton
- Unitary authority: Wiltshire
- Ceremonial county: Wiltshire
- Region: South West
- Country: England
- Sovereign state: United Kingdom
- Post town: Devizes
- Postcode district: SN10
- Dialling code: 01380
- Police: Wiltshire
- Fire: Dorset and Wiltshire
- Ambulance: South Western
- UK Parliament: Melksham and Devizes
- Website: Parish Council

Etchilhampton is a small village and civil parish in Wiltshire, England, in the Vale of Pewsey 3 miles (4.8 km) east of Devizes.

== History ==
The Domesday Book of 1086 recorded a settlement of 28 households, held by Edward of Salisbury. The manor came into the Malwain family by 1195, and in 1489 passed to the Wiltshire branch of the Ernle family, whose descendants included Sir Edward Ernle (c.1673-1729), a Member of Parliament. The land continued to pass by inheritance until it was sold in 1928.

The village had an alternative name of Ashlington, which was in common use until the 19th century. The village grew along both sides of a street, with the church near the middle; after houses in the central section fell into disuse, by 1885 that part of the street had been reduced to a footpath, and today the village continues as two distinct settlements.

Manor Farmhouse, a Grade II* listed two-storey timber framed building, is from the early 16th century. Etchilhampton House, built in 1773, is a Grade II listed two-storey three-bay house in brick and stone.

Etchilhampton stood on the Devizes-Upavon road until, in 1768, a new road (now the A342) was built on the southern slope of Etchilhampton Hill, avoiding the steep gradients of the earlier route. A few years later a monument – a stone plinth bearing a seated lion – was erected by the turning for Etchilhampton in memory of James Long of Wedhampton, who had promoted the new road.

A school was built in the centre of the village in 1831, and rebuilt in 1875. Children of all ages attended until 1929, when older pupils were transferred to Devizes. The school closed in 1970 owing to low numbers of pupils.

The population of the parish peaked in the mid 19th century, with 282 recorded at the 1841 census. Numbers fell to 170 by 1881 and have continued at or below that level.

== Parish church ==
The Church of England parish church of St Andrew dates from the 14th century and has a late 12th century font; other furnishings include 17th century box pews. The chancel was rebuilt in the 1860s.

The church was designated as Grade II* listed in 1962. It has always been a chapelry of All Saints' Church at All Cannings; today it is served by the Cannings and Redhorn team ministry, which covers a large area of the Vale of Pewsey.

== Local government ==
Etchilhampton is a civil parish with an elected parish council. It is in the area of Wiltshire Council unitary authority, which is responsible for most significant local government functions.
