= Reginald Drax =

Royal Navy Admiral (1880-1967)

Admiral The Honourable Sir Reginald Drax KCB DSO JP DL
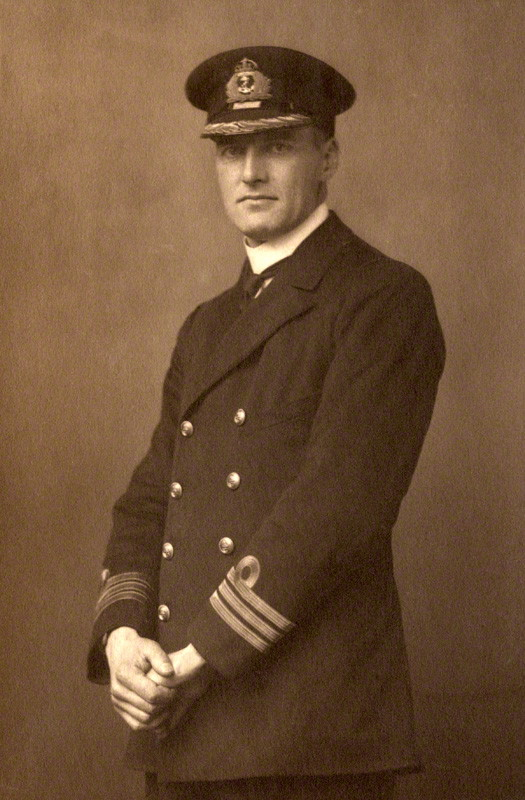
- Drax as a Commander, circa 1912-1916
- Born: Reginald Aylmer Ranfurly Plunkett; 28 August 1880; Marylebone, London
- Died: 16 October 1967 (aged 87); Poole, Dorset
- Relatives: Edward Plunkett, 18th Baron of Dunsany
- Military career
- Allegiance: United Kingdom
- Branch: Royal Navy
- Service years: 1894–1941
- Rank: Admiral
- Commands: Director, Royal Naval Staff College (1919–1922); President of Naval Inter-Allied Commission of Control (Berlin) (Jan 1923 – Aug 1924); HMS Marlborough (April 1926 – February 1927); America and West Indies Station (Apr 1932 – Oct 1934); Plymouth Command (Jun 1935 – Sep 1938)
- Conflicts: First World War: Heligoland; Dogger Bank; Jutland; Second World War
- Awards: Knight Commander of the Order of the Bath; Distinguished Service Order; Order of St Stanislas (2nd cl.) with Swords (1916); Knight Grand Cross, Order of Orange Nassau (19 January 1943)
- Other work: Home Guard (1941–1943); Commodore of Ocean Convoys (April 1943 – July 1945); Justice of the peace Deputy lieutenant, Dorset (Oct 1941)

Sir Reginald Aylmer Ranfurly Plunkett-Ernle-Erle-Drax, KCB, DSO, JP, DL (né Plunkett; 28 August 1880 – 16 October 1967), commonly known as Sir Reginald Plunkett or Sir Reginald Drax, was an Anglo-Irish admiral. The younger son of the 17th Baron of Dunsany, he was Director of the Royal Naval Staff College, President of the Naval Inter-Allied Commission of Control in (Berlin), commander-in-chief of successive Royal Navy bases. His brother Edward, who became the 18th Baron of Dunsany, was best known as the famous playwright and author Lord Dunsany. Edward inherited the paternal estates in Ireland, while Reginald was bequeathed most of his mother's inheritance across portions of the West Indies, Kent, Surrey, Dorset, Wiltshire and Yorkshire. He extended his surname by special Royal licence in 1916, and was noted for the quadruple-name result, Plunkett-Ernle-Erle-Drax.

== Early life and education ==
Sir Reginald was born in Marylebone, Westminster, the younger son of John Plunkett, 17th Baron of Dunsany (1853–1899) and his wife, Ernle Elizabeth Louisa Maria Grosvenor Burton, later Plunkett-Ernle-Erle-Drax (1855–1916). At 13 days old, he was christened at Holy Trinity Church, Marylebone. His elder brother was the celebrated Lord Dunsany, a prolific writer and author of more than 60 books. He was educated at Cheam School and joined the Royal Navy at the age of 14, training aboard the stationary school ship HMS Britannia from July 1894 to 1896.

His parents were distant cousins who came from influential and wealthy families. His father was the 17th Lord Dunsany, one of the oldest titles in the Peerage of Ireland. His mother, Ernle, was the daughter of Col. Francis Augustus Plunkett Burton (son of Admiral Ryder Burton and his wife, Anne Plunkett, the daughter of Randal Plunkett, 13th Baron Dunsany) and Sarah Charlotte Elizabeth Sawbridge-Erle-Drax (died 1905; daughter of John Sawbridge and his wife, Jane, daughter of Richard Erle-Drax-Grosvenor). Following the death of her brother, Richard, Jane became the sole heiress of Charborough House and other Erle-Drax estates.

After his grandmother Jane's death in 1905, Sir Reginald's mother added the additional surname Ernle on 20 December 1905 (becoming Ernle Plunkett-Ernle), then added Erle and Drax on 20 December 1906 (becoming Ernle Plunkett-Ernle-Erle-Drax), both by royal licence. She died in 1916, leaving Reginald the majority of her vast estates in Dorset, Kent, Surrey, Wiltshire, Yorkshire, and the West Indies. He assumed the additional surnames of Ernle-Erle-Drax on 4 October 1916 by royal licence. His long series of titles, Christian names, surnames and post-nominals has made him famous beyond his career as an admiral in the Royal Navy.

== Early career ==
In 1896, Drax passed out of the Britannia as a midshipman. He was promoted lieutenant on 15 January 1901. In 1909 he received an appointment to the Staff College, Camberley, to conduct an in-depth study of the subject of staff training and its application.

In 1909, the Admiralty published his book, Modern Naval Tactics. He hoped that it would contribute to a projected official tactical handbook. It drew on an analysis of gunnery from the recent experience of the Battle of Tsushima. He expected that visibility in the North Sea would limit the maximum range of battle fleet duels to 10,000 yards, but recognised that the need to stay outside improving torpedo range would increase gunnery ranges.

He also discussed in the book how to utilise cruisers as a fast wing to the battle fleet; the possible tactics of an inferior fleet, such as the High Seas Fleet; and the impact of ships zigzagging would have on gunnery.

The Times obituary claimed that Drax's book was dismissed by the skeptical older generation of admirals, who thought it highly presumptuous for a lowly lieutenant to write with authority on naval tactics. However, the book did succeed in making Drax a man of note. In 1912, when Winston Churchill instituted the Admiralty War Staff, Drax was the first of 15 officers selected to attend the new staff officer course. He was promoted to commander during the course and then appointed War Staff Officer to Sir David Beatty in the 1st Battlecruiser Squadron, an appointment he held until his promotion in 1916.

He served during the First World War aboard the battlecruiser HMS Lion and was present at the naval battles of Heligoland Bight, Dogger Bank and Jutland. He was promoted captain on 30 June 1916.

He was awarded the Distinguished Service Order in 1918 for his command of HMS Blanche.

== Interwar period ==
Drax held a series of senior naval appointments between the wars. From 1919 to 1922, he was Director of the Royal Naval Staff College at Greenwich. He then served as President of the Naval Allied Control Commission in Germany from 1923 to 1924. As a rear admiral, he served as second in command of the 1st Battle Squadron of the Mediterranean Fleet from 1929 to 1930 and second in command of the 2nd Battle Squadron in the Atlantic Fleet in 1930. From 1930 to 1932 he was ashore in the Admiralty as Director of Naval Mobilisation Department that became the Department of Manning. In a 1929 memo, he argued that there were three aspects to a naval battle, namely "geometry" (the movements of ships), "tactics" (the use of weapons to sink the enemy warships) and "morale" (the spirt of the crew). Drax argued that morale was the most important of his trio, and to win a battle required aggressive officers prepared to take risks by engaging the enemy fleet head-on and close-in. Drax along with Herbert Richmond claimed that admirals of the Great War such as John Jellicoe had been insufficiently aggressive.

Promoted to vice admiral on 24 September 1932, he held from 1932 to 1934 the command of the America and West Indies Squadron. From 1935 to 1938, he was Commander-in-Chief, Plymouth. In 1935, Drax rewrote the War Plans to call for officers to be aware of their commanding admiral's plans before a battle occurred instead of waiting for orders from the flagship during the battle, and an aggressive mentality in a ship's officers that called for them to take advantage of any unexpected chance that might emerge during a battle. In a lecture given later in 1935, Drax gave as examples of what he did not want to see happen in battle, namely a war game where the captain of a cruiser came within sight of the fleet playing the "enemy" who waited for orders to engage the "enemy" and another war game where the commander of a destroyer flotilla again waited for orders to engage the ships playing the "enemy". Drax charged that too many Royal Navy officers were too passive and would not act unless ordered to. Drax maintained that in wartime a captain of a ship should open fire on an enemy warship upon sight instead of passively waiting for orders from his admiral to open fire as he argued the latter was a highly dangerous practice. In a letter to Admiral Roger Backhouse in September 1935, Drax wrote the type of battle envisioned in the standard Battle Instructions was the one most least likely to occur in reality, and that changes were needed in Battle Instructions to prepare officers for the type of battle that they would actually be fighting.

Drax retired in 1938, but was brought out of retirement by the First Sea Lord, Admiral Roger Backhouse as the best man to plan out how to execute the Singapore strategy. In the event of a threat from Japan, British planning called to send out a strong Royal Navy force to Singapore, the main British naval base in Asia, to hopefully deter Japan from war or to be ready to confront the Imperial Japanese Navy in the South China Sea if war should come. Backhouse felt that the increasing aggressive Japanese behavior as demonstrated by the Second Sino-Japanese War made it imperative to finally work out how to best implement the Singapore strategy. Backhouse's plans to execute the Singapore strategy had called for sending a force of five or four battleships to Singapore, but Drax changed the Singapore strategy by calling for a "flying squadron" to be sent to Singapore with more forces to go east if necessary. A memo stated: "Drax favored relying on small, mobile forces to deter the Japanese from interfering and overrunning British interests in the Far East. Drax felt that a "flying squadron" of two battleships or battlecruisers, an aircraft carrier, a cruiser squadron, and a destroyer flotilla would be ideal for this purpose".

In addition, Drax called for another aircraft carrier to be sent to the Indian Ocean for the protection of both Australia and India. Drax's plans called for the "flying squadron" to confront the Japanese fleet in the South China Sea while he also called for another force to be stationed in Singapore that was to consist of 8 cruisers, 17 destroyers, 15 submarines, 12 motor torpedo boats, and two minelayers for the protection of the trade routes and for the defense of Singapore itself. Drax admitted that his plan would require the British to stay on the defensive on the account of the numerical superiority of the Japanese Navy and it would be impossible to deliver a "knock-out blow" against Japan with the forces envisioned. Drax wrote that the Royal Navy would be able to take the offensive against the Imperial Japanese Navy only in the event of more British naval forces to be sent to Singapore and/or if the United States was involved, stating a combined Anglo-American fleet would have the necessary numbers to take the offensive against Japan. Drax argued that Britain needed control of the Mediterranean Sea both to supply and reinforce the forces in Singapore and to allow the necessary numbers to take on Japan. Believing that Benito Mussolini would try to take advantage of Britain being engaged in a war with Germany and/or Japan, Drax called for the Royal Navy to deliver a "knock-out blow" against the Regia Marina first before turning east to focus on Japan. Drax noted that the location of Italy in the central Mediterranean required any British naval forces going east to enter the Suez canal on the way to Singapore to first sail past Italy, which led him to argue that the Regia Marina had to be eliminated first to execute the Singapore strategy.

Drax argued that in the event of war, the Japanese would try to capture Singapore. Drax argued that there were two ways that the Japanese would come, namely the "direct approach" of a landing at Singapore or the "step-by-step approach" of first capturing Hong Kong and Brunei as the prelude to taking Singapore. Drax argued that the defenses of Singapore had to be strengthened to prevent the "direct approach" while in the case of the "step-by-step approach", British aircraft, submarines and light vessels should try to interdict Japanese ships in the South China Sea. Finally, Drax argued that the battleships of the "flying squadron" should be of the modern Queen Elizabeth class, which he felt to be the best battleships to face the Imperial Navy Drax wrote that the "superior training" of the Royal Navy's crews would make the decisive difference while he used the Japanese obsession with secrecy as almost nothing was known about the latest warships of the Imperial Navy other than that they existed, which led him to argue that it was quite possible that the Japanese warships were inferior.

== Mission to Moscow ==
He was the British half of the Anglo-French delegation sent to Moscow in August 1939 alongside General Joseph Doumenc to discuss a possible alliance with the USSR with Soviet Defense Commissar Kliment Voroshilov. As an indication of the low priority the Allied governments put on the mission, it was sent by sea aboard the outdated merchant ship City of Exeter on a slow voyage to Leningrad. The Foreign Secretary, Lord Halifax, had vetoed sending the military mission on a fast-moving cruiser or a destroyer because he felt sending a British warship into the Baltic Sea would have been perceived by Nazi Germany as a provocation, which led to the City of Exeter, which moved at only 13 knots, being chartered to take the mission to Leningrad. The Soviet ambassador Ivan Maisky, confronted Drax about the choice of transportation, asking him why he was travelling on the City of Exeter instead of taking the first flight to Moscow. Drax claimed to Maisky that he needed a ship because of all the excess baggage he was bringing with him to Moscow, an explanation that Maisky did not find very believable. In fact, Drax had been ordered to go as slowly as possible to Moscow.

Herbert von Dirksen, the German ambassador in London reported to the State Secretary Ernst von Weizsäcker: "The continuation of negotiations for a pact with Russia, in spite of – or rather, just because of – the dispatch of a military mission is regarded here with skepticism. This is borne out by the composition of the British military mission: the admiral, until now the Commandant of Portsmouth, is practically in retirement, and was never on the staff of the Admiralty; the general is likewise purely a combat officer; the air general is an outstanding aviator and air instructor, but not a strategist. This indicates the value of the military mission is more to ascertain the fighting value of the Soviet Army rather than to make operational arrangements...The Wehrmacht attachés are agreed in observing a surprising skepticism in British military circles about the forthcoming talks with the Soviet armed forces."

The Soviets did not take the delegation seriously because Drax did not have any power to make decisions without the approval of the British government, rendering him next to powerless. Furthermore, although the Allied governments were willing to grant the Red Army transit rights through Poland and Romania they were unwilling to allow them to enter Polish Galicia and the Vilno Gap. Joseph Stalin told his foreign minister Vyacheslav Molotov "They're not being serious. These people can't have the proper authority. London and Paris are playing poker again." The British government also ignored advice to send an officer of equivalent rank as Edmund Ironside, who had been sent on a similar mission to meet Polish Marshal Edward Rydz-Śmigły in Warsaw.

== Second World War ==
In December 1939, Drax was appointed Commander-in-Chief, The Nore, serving until 1941. It was an important post, as he was responsible for the protection of the east coast convoys from Scotland to London. He faced the multiple threats of acoustic mines and magnetic mines as well as attacks from Wehrmacht air and surface vessels, especially after the fall of the Netherlands and of Belgium. In October 1939 he was appointed President of the Board of Inquiry into the sinking of HMS Royal Oak by the Kriegsmarine submarine U-47.

As the war continued, advancing years caused him to retire from the active navy list and to join the British Home Guard. Nonetheless, he went to sea from 1943 to 1945 as a convoy commodore during the Battle of the Atlantic.

Alongside Admiral Herbert Richmond and Vice-Admiral Kenneth Dewar, Drax was considered to be an intellectual with controversial views, including the need for naval reform.

He was an early pioneer of solar heating.

== Legacy ==
His friend, James Bond novelist Ian Fleming, named the character Sir Hugo Drax in his book Moonraker as a tribute.

== Publications ==
- He wrote a book entitled Handbook on Solar Heating (Montefiore Stalin 272)
- Admiral Drax's papers are at Churchill College, Cambridge.
- He is also referred to in David Niven's autobiography The Moon's a Balloon when he assisted in the starting of Niven's career. Niven was on his uppers, having left the Army and adrift in Hollywood. After a cocktail party on the Admiral's ship, he was deposited the following morning into the press barge at a PR junket for the launch of the film Mutiny on the Bounty. Niven goes on to reveal it made him stand out and be recognised and become the only man "to crash Hollywood in a battleship".

== Family ==
In 1916, he married Kathleen Chalmers. They had four daughters and one son. Their youngest daughter, Mary (1925–2017), married Robert Rothschild in her second marriage. Their son, Henry Walter Plunkett-Ernle-Erle-Drax (1928–2017), is the father of Richard Drax, who was Conservative MP for South Dorset from 2010 to 2024.

== Books ==
- Carley, Michael Jabara (1999). 1939: The Alliance That Never Was and the Coming of World War II. Ivan Dee: Chicago.
- Field, Andrew (2004). Royal Navy Strategy in the Far East, 1919-1939 Preparing for War Against Japan. London: Frank Cass. ISBN 9781135774073.
- Schorske, Carl (1953). "Two German Ambassadors: Dirksen and Schulenburg". In Gordon A. Craig and Felix Gilbert (ed.). The Diplomats 1919–1939. Princeton: Princeton University Press. pp. 477–511.

Military offices
Preceded by Sir Vernon Haggard	Commander-in-Chief, America and West Indies Station; 1932–1934	Succeeded by Sir Matthew Best
Preceded by Sir Eric Fullerton	Commander-in-Chief, Plymouth; 1935–1938	Succeeded by Sir Martin Dunbar-Nasmith
Preceded by Sir Studholme Brownrigg	Commander-in-Chief, The Nore; 1939–1941	Succeeded by Sir George Lyon
Honorary titles
Preceded by Sir Roger Backhouse	First and Principal Naval Aide-de-Camp; 1939–1941	Succeeded by Sir Dudley Pound
