= Ryder Burton =

Royal Navy Admiral (1795–1876)

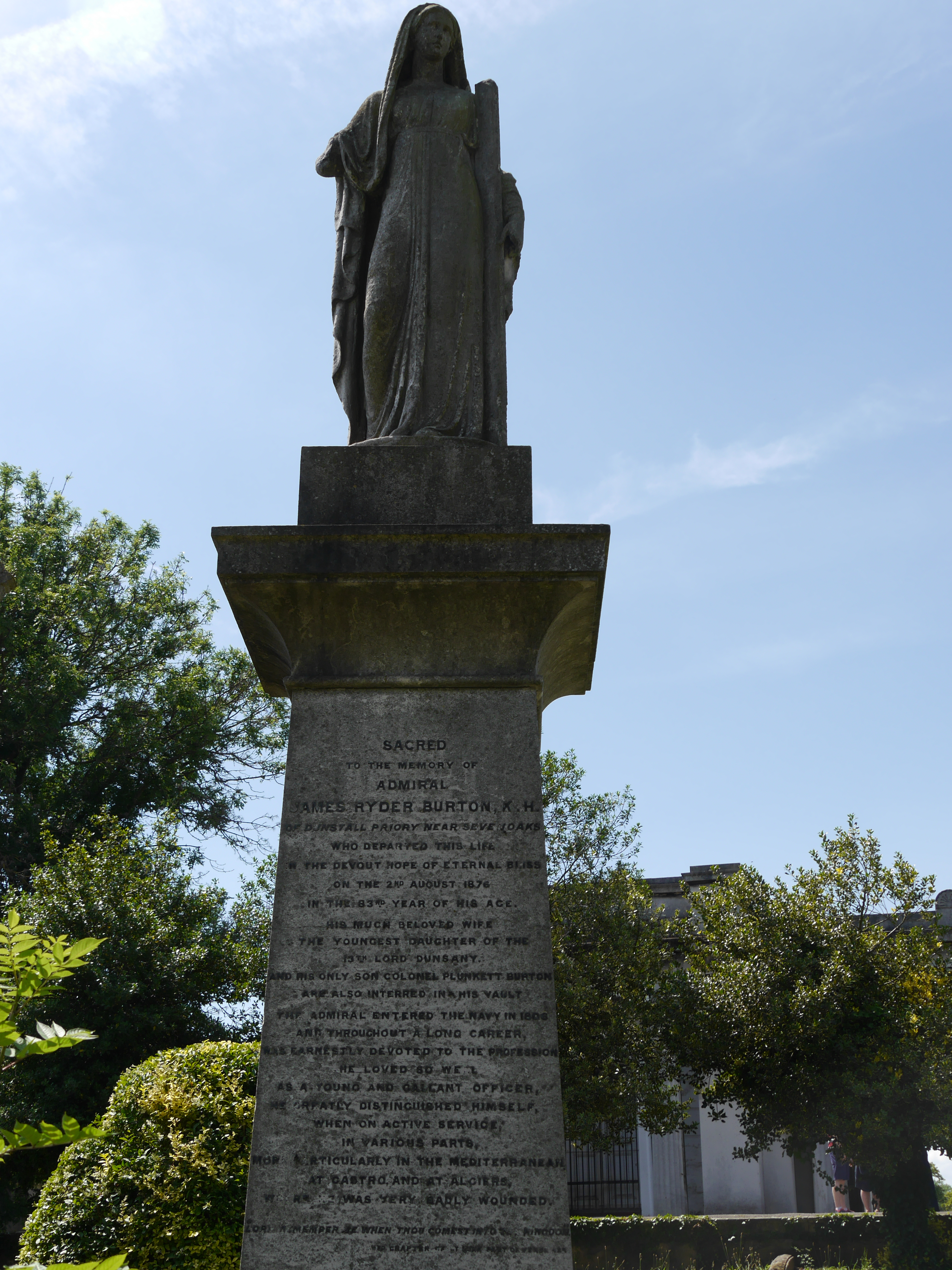
Monument, Kensal Green Cemetery

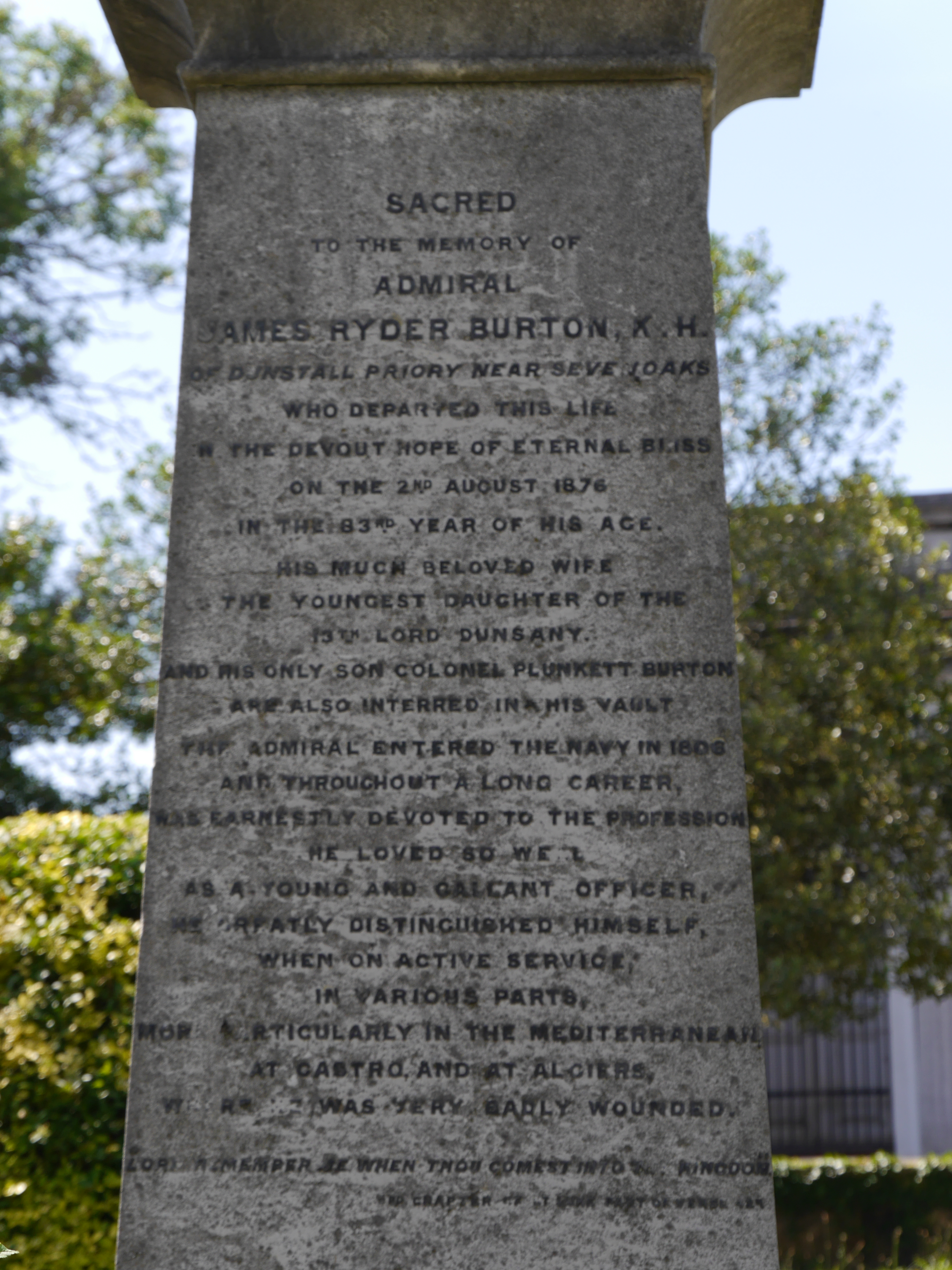
Monument detail, Kensal Green Cemetery

Admiral James Ryder Burton, KH (1795 – 2 August 1876) was a British Royal Navy officer.

He was the son of Edmund Burton, the Dean of Killala.

He progressed on the Reserved List to the rank of Admiral on 14 November 1863.

In 1823, he married Anne Maria Plunkett, the widow of Philip Roche of Dublin and youngest daughter of Randal Plunkett, 13th Baron of Dunsany (1739–1821).

He was believed by some to be an heir to an old baronetcy in the Baronetage of England that was possibly dormant, but he did not pursue inheriting it.
