= Walter Erle (died 1581) =

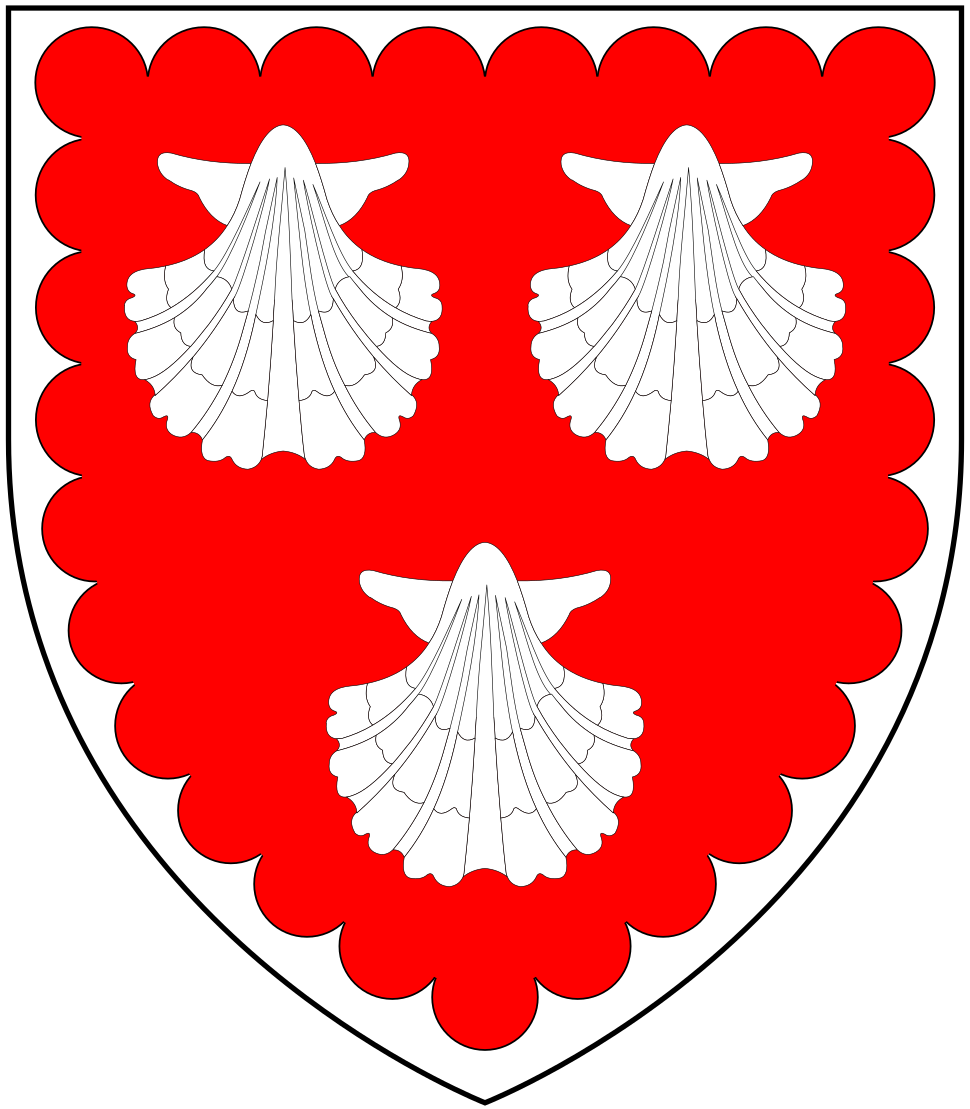
Arms of Erle: Gules, three escallops argent a bordure engrailed of the last

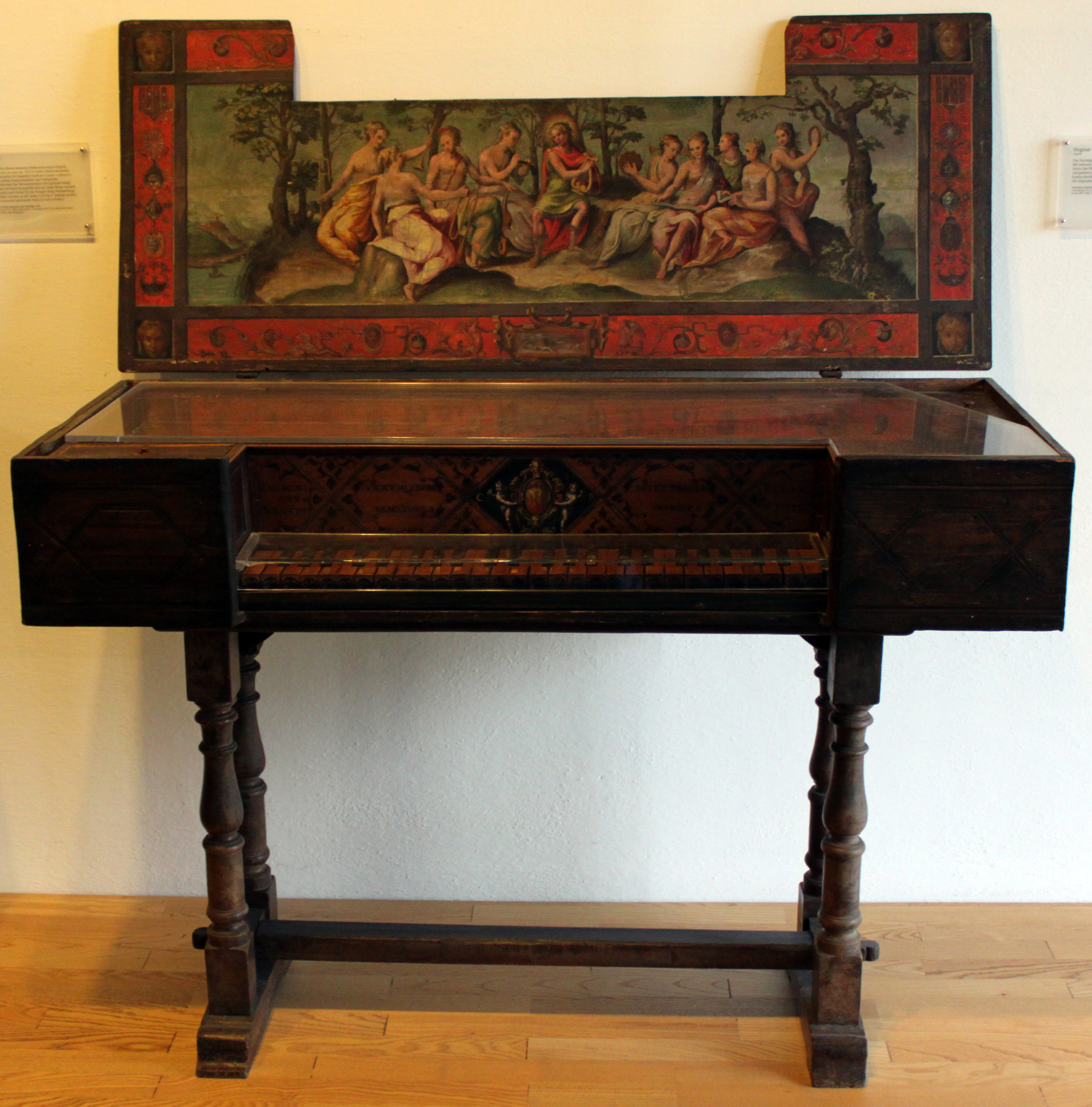
A virginal, the musical instrument played by Walter Erle, this one contemporaneous with his life, made in Venice in 1566. Germanic National Museum, Nuremberg

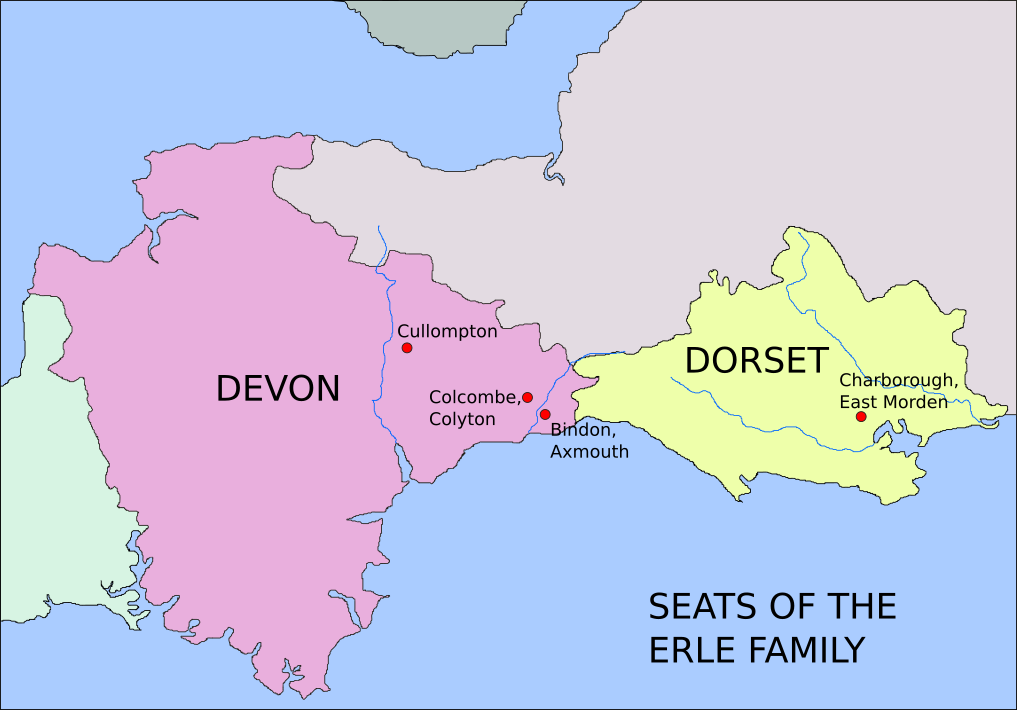
Map showing seats of the Erle family, circa 1500–1600: Cullompton; Colcombe, Colyton; Bindon, Axmouth; Charborough, East Morden

Walter Erle (c.1515/20–1581) (alias Erley, Erell, etc.) of Colcombe in the parish of Colyton, of Bindon in the parish of Axmouth, both in Devon, and of Charborough in Dorset, England, was a courtier and servant of the Royal Household to two of the wives of King Henry VIII, namely Catherine Howard and Catherine Parr, and successively to his son King Edward VI (1547–1553) and two daughters, Queen Mary I (1553–1558) and Queen Elizabeth I (1558–1603) during their successive reigns.

According to Sandon (1983) his popularity as a royal courtier was in part due to his ability as a musician, particularly as a player of the virginal. He is known to have composed at least one work of church music, namely Ave Vulnus Lateris ("Hail, O Wound of the Side"), a short votive antiphon in honour of one of the Five Holy Wounds of Jesus, his authorship of which is recorded in Peterhouse College manuscripts 471–474, held in the Cambridge University Library, comprising four partbooks from a set of five copied late in the reign of King Henry VIII, which contain seventy-two pieces of Latin church music. As a courtier-musician he well represents the ideal royal courtier described in The Courtier by Baldassare Castiglione (d.1529) and also in The Boke Named The Governour by Sir Thomas Elyot (d.1546).

Although he was born into a minor gentry family of Devonshire, he founded a dynasty of substantial landed gentry that survives to the present day, his heir (albeit via several female lines) being the Conservative Member of Parliament Richard Grosvenor Plunkett-Ernle-Erle-Drax (born 1958), of Charborough House.

== Origins ==
No record of Erle's birth survives, but circumstantial evidence suggests a birthdate between 1515 and 1520. He was the son of John III Erle of Cullompton in Devon, by his wife Thomasyn. Walter's grandfather was John II Erle of Cullompton, the second son of John I Erle of Ashburton, Devon.

== Career as courtier ==
=== King Henry VIII ===
The earliest surviving document which mention Walter Erle is a list which appears to date from 1537 to 1547, entitled The booke of Certayne of the Quenys Ordynary as yet to no place Appoynted, a list of 127 above-stairs members of a queen's existing household whose appointment to new positions is envisaged but not completed, in which Erle is named last among three Pagis of the Chamber Ordynary. Sandon deduced the queen in question to be Katherine Howard (beheaded 1542), the 5th wife of Henry VIII. Erle was thus a page in her service at the time of her downfall in November 1541 due to adultery. Erle however retained a position at court after Katherine's execution, having been transferred to the household of Edward Seymour, Earl of Hertford (later 1st Duke of Somerset), the eldest brother of Queen Jane Seymour (d.1537), the third wife of Henry VIII, and the future Lord Protector of England from 1547 until 1549 during the minority of his nephew, King Edward VI (1547–1553).

Erle is mentioned in Hertford's household accounts drawn up by his steward John Thynne, including on 30 June 1542 a payment of 40 shillings to Water Erley by my lady's comandement for a payre of virginalls, the lady in question being Anne Stanhope, Hertford's second wife. According to Sandon this reference to Erle is highly significant for several reasons, namely: it is the earliest dated reference to Erle in the orbit of the royal household; it is the earliest to link him with the Seymour family; it is—by several decades—the earliest to place him explicitly in a musical context and to associate him with a keyboard instrument; and it is the only known reference that spells his name in a manner identical with one of the spellings in the Peterhouse College manuscripts, in which his musical work Ave Vulnus Lateris is recorded.

Erle's continuing presence at court is suggested by a payment of 40 shillings received by him in April 1543 from Princess (and future Queen) Mary (eldest daughter of Henry VIII), after which the records concerning him are silent for several months.

Erle returned to the inner circle of the royal court following the 6th and last marriage of Henry VIII to Catherine Parr (d.1548) on 12 July 1543, and became a Gentleman Waiter to that queen, as is evident from the final entry in a mid-1540s list of additions to the royal household's expenditure:

Item, yt ye 2nd day of November in ye 35th yeare (i.e. of his reign, 1543), ye Kings pleasure was declared by ye mouth of Mr Herbert, yt Walter Earle shoud yearly have ye Wages of £ x in lieu of a Gent Wayter to ye Queens Grace.

=== King Edward VI ===
Following the death of King Henry VIII in 1547, Erle's career at court depended on Queen Katherine Parr (d.1548), the king's widow. He became a member of her household, apparently due to his connection with the Seymour family, when three months after the king's death she remarried to Thomas Seymour, 1st Baron Seymour of Sudeley (d.1549), Lord Admiral of England, the younger brother of Queen Jane Seymour, an uncle of King Edward VI and brother of Edward Seymour, 1st Duke of Somerset (d.1552), Lord Protector of England. As former fellow courtiers to Henry VIII, Thomas Seymour was well-acquainted with Erle, whom he referred to in a letter to his wife as "my old friend". Furthermore, in 1544 Thomas Seymour had purchased from Erle various of the latter's speculative acquisitions of former monastic lands. Erle also had business dealings with the Lord Protector, from whom in 1548 he purchased a twenty-one-year lease on property in Ottery St Mary, Devon, including "the Warden's House" of the dissolved college there.

Following the death of his wife in 1548, and released from her restraining influence, Thomas Parr's "imprudence and recklessness now became increasingly manifest", and Erle became caught up in his master's ambitious scheme of personal aggrandisement, which involved seizing control of his nephew the king. In 1548 Thomas Seymour offered to Princess Mary, King Edward VI's eldest sister, the services of Erle to provide lessons on the virginal, and shortly afterwards Erle passed her a compromising letter from Thomas Seymour, which eventually was discovered and assisted in providing evidence of the latter's plot in 1549 against the young king, for which he was executed soon after. Erle's role in the conspiracy was wholly innocent and he suffered no penalty; however, he had lost his patron and was absent from court circles for another two years. During this period he appears to have resided at Colcombe House in Colyton, Devon, in which parish on 22 October 1549 he married Mary Wyke.

On 9 April 1551, with effect from the previous Christmas, he was appointed a Groom of the Privy Chamber to King Edward VI, at a yearly salary of £20. This was thus his first position as a direct servant of a monarch. Shortly afterwards he received various royal grants of land, including in 1552 the manor and advowson of Axmouth (in which parish was situated his wife's inheritance of Bindon), for an annual rent of £53 13s. 6d, formerly part of the dower lands of Katherine Parr. In 1553 he was granted the reversion of the leaseholds of various ex-monastic property in Devon, including part of Dunkeswell Abbey.

=== Queen Mary I ===
On the accession of Queen Mary I in 1553, Erle retained a position as a servant of the Privy Chamber, although his exact role is unclear. This is evidenced by his inclusion on several livery lists allocating clothing to courtiers of the queen. The earliest such list including his name is dated 4 November 1553, and is "signed by the Queen's hand", as follows:

"We woll and Commaunde youe that Imediatly upon the syghte hereof ye deliver or cause to be delivered yerely unto our welbelovede Servvante Walter Earle oon of our prevye Chambre theise percelles Folowinge That is to saye: fourtene yardes of good blacke velvett; fourtene yardes of good blacke Damaske or Satten to make him a gowne, Coate and doblett; oon Furre of very good booge (i.e. budge, lamb's skin) for the sayde Gowne price eyghte powndes; twoo yardes d’ (i.e.and a half) of fyne Marble Clothe to make him a winter Cooate; two yardes d’ of Russett velvett to garde the sayde Cooate; two yardes d’ of fyne grene clothe to make him a Sommer Cooate; two yardes d’ of good grene velvett to garde the sayde Cooate, withe makinge lyninge, sylke buttons and all other necessarie thinges to the sayde gowne, Cooate, doblett, furre and all other the premises in enywyse belonginge or apperteining. And theise our lettres shalbe youre sufficiente warraunte and dischardge in that behalff. Yeven undre our Signett at our palaice of Westminster the fowerthe daye of Novembre in the furste yere of our Reigne".

In about 1554 Erle was promoted to the position of a Gentleman of the Privy Chamber. on New Year's Day 1556 Erle made a gift to Queen Mary of "a booke covered with blacke vellat of the Comentary of Warre, in Englishe". On 3 July 1558 he was granted a licence to export English wheat to Spain.

=== Queen Elizabeth I and retirement ===
Following the death of Queen Mary in 1558, Erle now aged in his late-thirties, appears to have retired from court to concentrate on expanding and consolidating his landholdings in Devon and Dorset. His name does not appear in the lists of active servants of the next monarch Queen Elizabeth I (1558–1603), although he is still referred to as late as 1578 as "of the Queen’s privy chamber", perhaps in title only.

== Career as musician ==
Little is known concerning Erle's career as a musician, an unusual career for a member of the landed gentry at that period. Indeed, Sandon states: "One might doubt that the connection between him and the composer of Ave Vulnus Lateris was anything more than a coincidence of names". It is clear that Erle was primarily a courtier and secondly a musician, unlike for example Philip van Wilder (1500–1554), a Flemish lutenist and composer who worked as a court musician circa 1520s–1550s, and then became a Gentleman of the Privy Chamber, and who is referred to in royal household accounts primarily as a musician. As Sandon (1983) states: "Where(as) van Wilder deserved his position by virtue of his musical ability, Erle deserved his by his status and upbringing, his musical skill being a useful adjunct". However four pieces of evidence are given by Sandon which serve to confirm the courtier Walter Erle as a musician:

- A payment to him made in June 1542 by Edward Seymour for a pair of virginals. However, this was not unusual as a similar payment is recorded as having been made to the courtier Hugh Denys (c.1440–1511), who is not supposed to have been a musician. Money is recorded having been paid in August 1502 by Elizabeth of York, Queen of Henry VII, to Hugh Denys, reimbursing him for paying a deliveryman, or possibly their maker come in person, for a pair of clavichords, a form of virginal, thought to be amongst the earliest imported into England. The transaction is recorded in the Privy Purse expenses of Elizabeth of York, August 1502: "Item, the same day, Hugh Denys, for money by him delivered to a stranger (i.e. foreigner) that gave the Queen a payre of clavycordes. In crowns for his reward, iiii libres" (£4). The reward was four times greater than the estimated value of the gift, perhaps signifying the royal mark of approval and appreciation of the maker's generosity. As Alison Weir wrote of King Henry VIII "It was common for subjects to bring gifts to royalty in the expectation of a reward and such largesse or tipping was expected of a monarch".
- A note in "a collection of vocal music copied in 1742 by John Immyns, founder of the Madrigal Society, where folio 1 recto is annotated The following Seven from a Manuscript written in ye year 1551 and wch belonged to Walterus Erle one of the Gentlemen of ye Bedchamber to K. Henry ye 8th".(Sandon)
- "A pavan ascribed to Erle in several later sources of keyboard music" (Sandon), namely: entitled "Walter Earles Pavan" in the FitzWilliam Virginal Book (341/2–343/1); "Maister Earles Pavane" in Anthony Holborne's The Cittharn Schoole (London, 1597), H1v–H2r; and "Walter Erles Paven" in Cul, ms Dd.4.23, ff. 2–3.
- "The record of a later court appointment: Virginalls Orlando Gibbons to attend in His Highnesses Privy Chamber which was heretofore supplied by Walter Earle deceased at £46 per annum from Michaelmas 1619". (Sandon).

Sandon concludes, concerning the career of Erle:

"It appears, then, that whatever may have been the other qualities – gentle birth, influential connections, a pleasing countenance, an engaging manner, a quick wit – that helped to gain for Erle his admission to the Privy Chamber, the attribute that kept him there and assured his success was his musical ability. He was lucky that Henry VIII and his daughters were so fond of music and so generous in their patronage of it. A significant part of Erle’s contribution to the life of the royal household must have been musical, as a solo keyboard player, a participant in instrumental and vocal consorts, and a composer".

== Marriage and children ==
In November 1546 "an official letter was written to one of Walter’s relations in support of his intention to marry". This proposed wife appears to have been his cousin Nicola Erle. The letter is listed in the Letters and Papers of Henry VIII as: A let[ter] to Nicolas (sic) Erle doughter (sic) and heire to John Erle deceased in the favour of Walter Erle the quenes servant for mariage preferred by Mr Dennye.

22 October 1549 at Colyton, he married Mary Wyke, the third of four daughters and co-heiresses of Richard Wyke of Bindon in the parish of Axmouth, Devon, three miles south-east of Colcombe. Richard Wyke was a great-grandson of Roger Wyke (died c. 1467) (alias Wykes, Wycke, Wick, Wicks, Weeke, etc.), a Member of Parliament for Plympton Erle, Devon, in 1413, a younger son of William Wyke of North Wyke in the parish of South Tawton in Devon. Richard Wyke died without sons, leaving four daughters and co-heiresses. Mary's share of her paternal inheritance included Bindon and a moiety of her father's larger estate at Charborough in Dorset. Erle re-purchased the other moiety from Alice Wykes, Mary's elder sister, and made it his principal residence. By his wife he had children as follows:

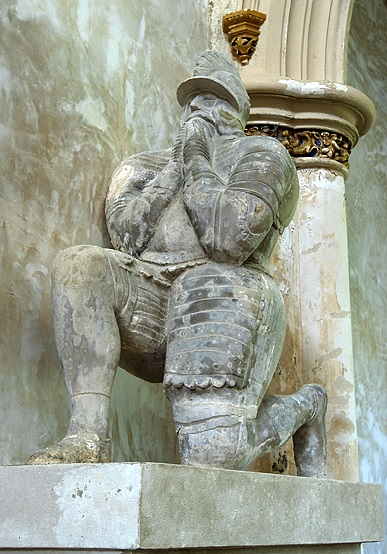
Effigy of Thomas Erle (d.1597) of Charborough. St Mary's Church, Morden, Dorset

- Thomas Erle (d.1597), eldest son, whose large effigy dressed in full-armour and kneeling on one knee in prayer, survives (re-positioned) in St Mary's Church, Morden, Dorset, the parish church of Charborough House. In 1581 at Shute in Devon, he married Dorothy Pole, a daughter of his father's near neighbour William Pole (1515–1587), Esquire, MP, of Shute House in the parish of Shute, near Colyton, Devon. Dorothy's brother was the Devon antiquary and historian Sir William Pole (1561–1635) whose principal seat was Colcombe House in the parish of Colyton, the former residence of Walter Erle of which mansion house and deerpark a lease had been granted to him by the Queen Katherine Parr. Pole describes various of the Erle family's landholdings in his work Collections Towards a Description of the County of Devon. Dorothy's mother was Katherine Popham (died 1588), the sister of John Popham (1531–1607), Lord Chief Justice. Dorothy survived her husband and remarried to Sir Walter Vaughan (c.1572–1639), of Falstone (alias Fallersdon) in the parish of Bishopstone, Wiltshire, Sheriff of Wiltshire in 1599–1600 and a Member of Parliament for Wiltshire in 1606. Thomas Erle commenced building a pier at Axmouth, which manor had been acquired by his father. By his wife he had children including:
  - Col. Sir Walter Erle (1586–1665) of Charborough, eldest surviving son and heir, a Member of Parliament and a vigorous opponent of King Charles I in the Parliamentary cause both before and during the English Civil War.
- John Erle (born 1557), baptised at Colyton on 23 January 1557, died young;

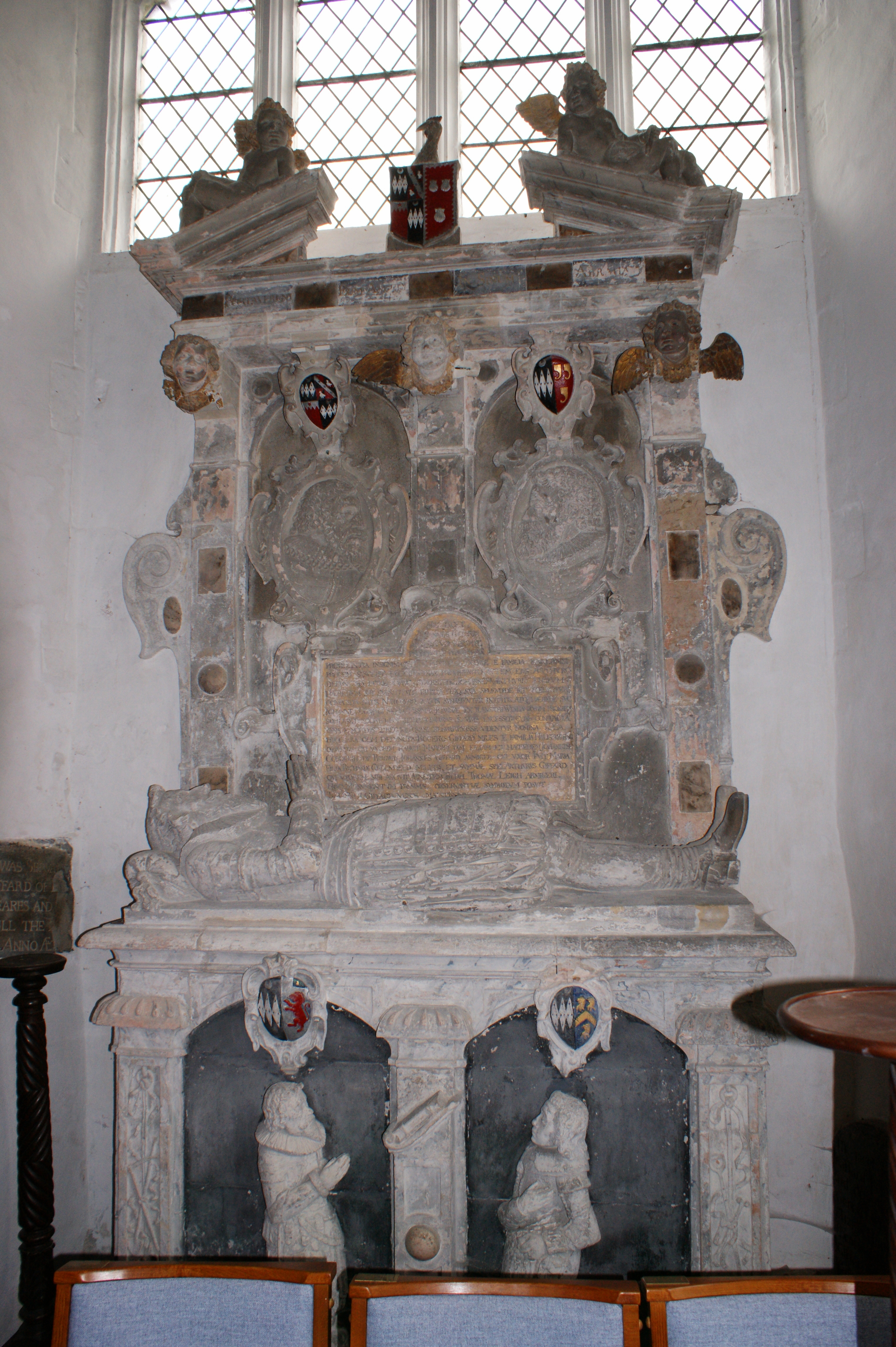
Giffard monument in Chittlehampton Church with recumbent effigy of John Gifford (d.1622), husband of Honor Erle. At the top of the monument are shown the quartered arms of Giffard (Sable, three fusils conjoined in fess ermine) impaling Erle

- Honor Erle (1555–1638), eldest daughter, baptised at Colyton 3 August 1555, who married John Gifford (d.1622) of Brightley in the parish of Chittlehampton, Devon. Her grandson was the prominent Royalist leader during the Civil War, Col. John Giffard (1602–1665) of Brightley. The arms of Erle are displayed (impaled by Giffard quartered) on top of the monument containing the recumbent effigy of her husband in Chittlehampton Church.
- Bridget Erle (born 1558), baptised at Colyton 21 June 1558.

== Landholdings ==
- Colcombe, Colyton. On 2 November 1543, the day on which he was appointed a Gentleman Waiter to Queen Katherine Parr, he was appointed by letters patent keeper of the park and mansion of Colcombe, in the parish of Colyton in Devon, and bailiff and hayward of the manor and hundred of Colyton. Colcombe had been a seat of Henry Courtenay, 1st Marquess of Exeter, 2nd Earl of Devon (executed 1539), which he forfeited following his attainder in 1538. Courtenay had commenced building a grand mansion at Colcombe, which was never completed by him. This confiscated estate and offices were given by King Henry VIII to his new wife Katherine Parr as part of her marriage settlement, and she was thus free to dispose of it as she wished. The grant to Erle was backdated to the previous Michaelmas, with fees of 52 shillings per annum as bailiff and hayward and 2 pence per day as keeper. On 1 July 1546 the queen transformed the grant to Erle into a 40-year lease, free of rent, which however required Erle to surrender the keepership and to provide 26 deer from the park for the queen. The grant was as follows:

Walter Erle to have the commoditie of the grounde and lodge within the parc of Colcombe for xl^{ti} yeres rent free in recompence of his office and fee wch he hadd thereof, reserving alwais at his own chardge certain haie and vixx dere for your mai'ties use. Subscribed by Mr Southwell. At the quenes highness sute.

- Ex-monastic lands. Like many of his contemporary courtiers, Erle used his privileged position to acquire at advantageous prices former monastic lands following the Dissolution of the Monasteries. In September 1544 with two associates, Thomas Strowde and James Paget, he invested the enormous sum of £2,875 12 shillings 3 pence in purchasing (via the Court of Augmentations) various westcountry estates, which, as was commonly done, he almost immediately re-sold at a profit, having obtained from the king the requisite licences to alienate.
- Newenham Priory, Devon, lease of, which was prolonged to him by patent dated 18 December 1555.
- East Morden and land in East and West Morden, Lytchett and Wareham, Dorset, acquired on 8 April 1564 from Philip Steynynges.
- Morden, rectory and advowson of, reversion granted by Queen Elizabeth I on 18 November 1578 to "Walter Erle, of the

Queen’s privy chamber".

== Death, burial and will ==
He died shortly before 8 November 1581, the date of his burial at Morden. In his will was dated 4 January 1581 he bequeathed to his wife Mary £20 in cash, the income from the manor and parsonage of Axmouth, the income from four hundred sheep, six cows, six bullocks and six calves, and the use of the house at Bindon and its contents during her life. The reversion of these properties and all his other assets and lands, including Charborough and the contents of his house, he left to his eldest son Thomas Erle, whom he required to pay the sum of £400 each to his two unmarried sisters Bridget and Mary, towards their marriage or maintenance. To the parishes of Morden and Axmouth he left 40 shillings each, for the upkeep of the poor. The executor of his will was his son Thomas.

== Sources ==
- Sandon, Nicholas John, "The Henrician Partbooks belonging to Peterhouse, Cambridge (Cambridge University Library, Peterthouse Manuscripts 471–474): A Study, with Restorations of the Incomplete Compositions Contained in them". Submitted by Nicholas John Sandon to the University of Exeter as a dissertation for the degree of Doctor of Philosophy in Music in the Faculty of Arts February 1983. Revised summer 2009 for inclusion in DIAMM (Digital Image Archive of Medieval Music). Source:Chapters I–II; Chapter III, Volume I: "The Composers in Ph", pp. 81–114, including Walter Erle (d.1581), pp. 86–96 (Note: The Dissertation (by the musicologist Nicholas Sandon (born 1948), later Professor of Music, Exeter University 1993–2001, a Fellow of the Society of Antiquaries, London) examines Peterhouse mss 471–474 (Cambridge, University Library), four partbooks from a set of five copied late in the reign of Henry VIII, which contain seventy-two pieces of Latin church music. Chapter III of Volume I "brings together biographical information from published and unpublished sources on the composers represented in the books" (Summary, p.vii) including Walter Erle (d.1581))
- Sandon, Nick, (Ed.), "Hedley, Edward: Terrenum Sitiens Regnum; Erle, Walter: Ave Vulnus Lateris", Antico Edition, RCM112, available from the Royal School of Church Music
