= Roger Wyke =

Member of the Parliament of England

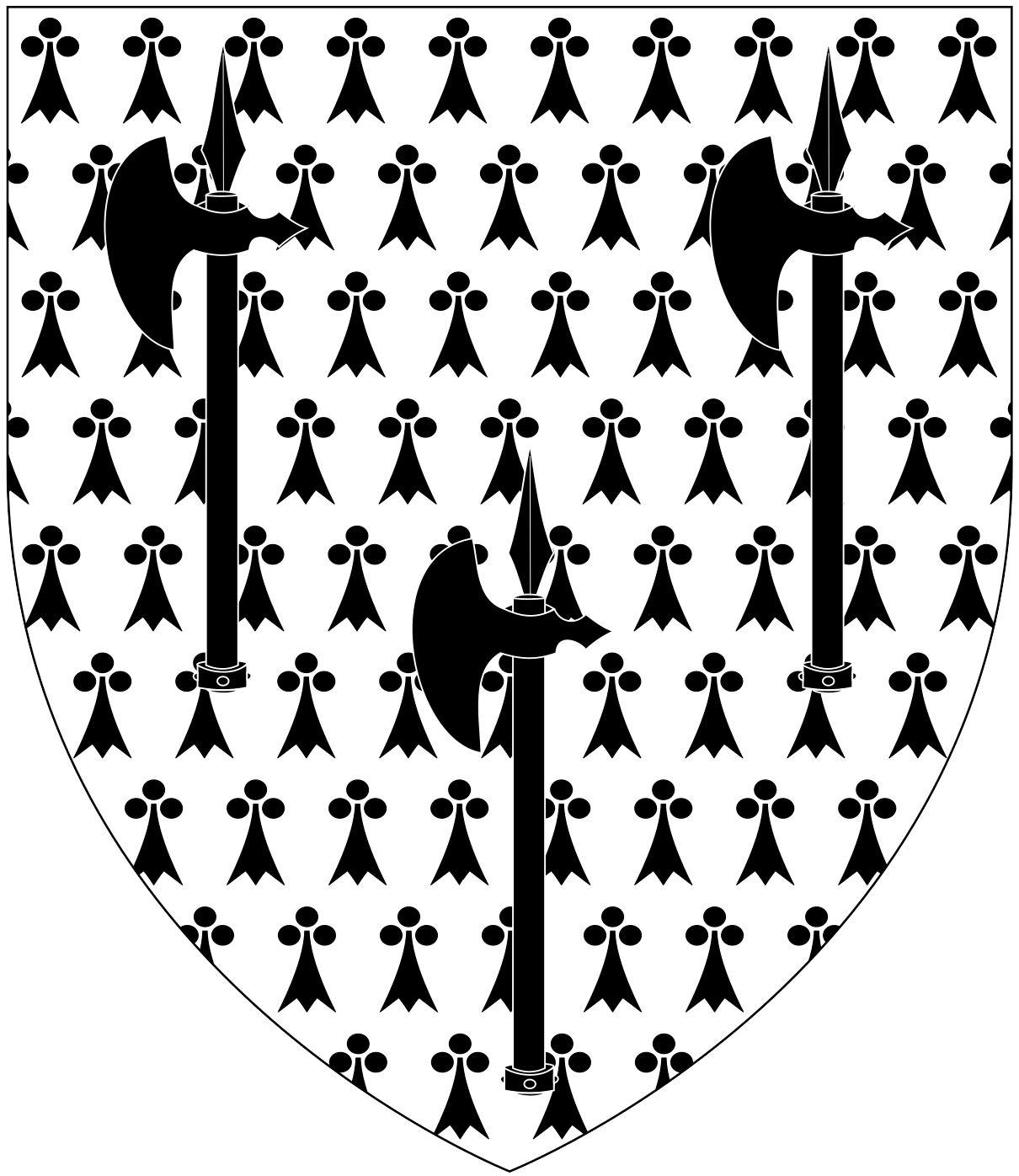
Arms of Wykes of North Wyke and of Cocktree, both in the parish of South Tawton: Ermine, three battle-axes sable. The similarity of these arms to those born by the prominent Wrey family later of Tawstock Court, North Devon, is suggested by Worthy (1896) to prove that they are "collateral kinsfolk of the Wykes".

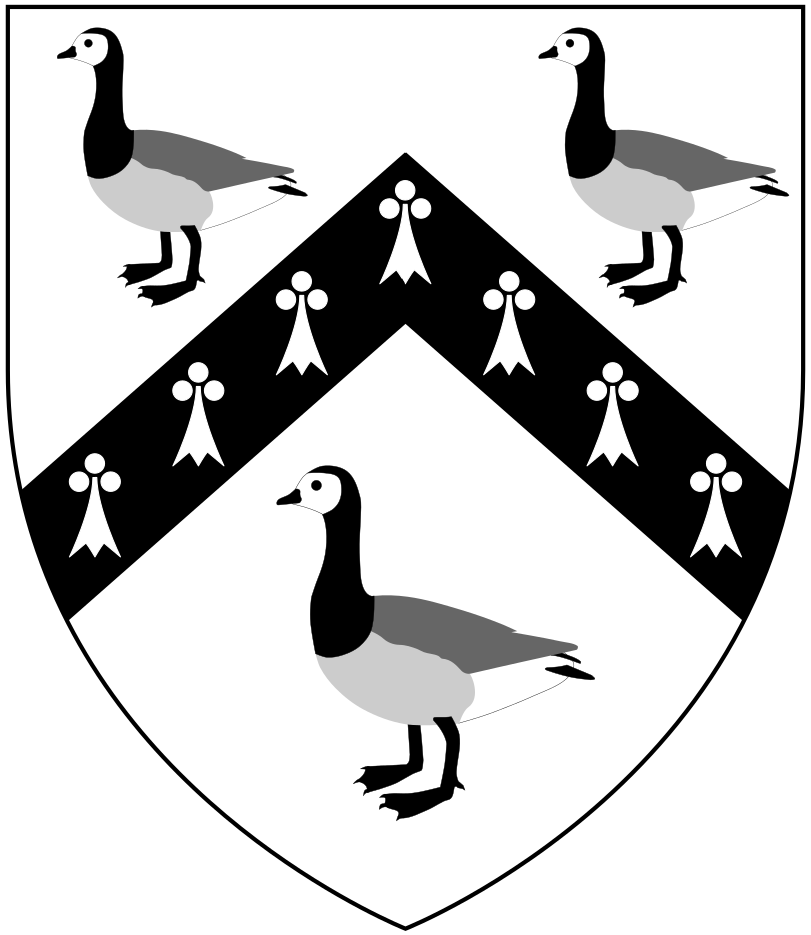
Arms of Burnell of Cocktree in the parish of South Tawton, Devon: Argent, a chevron ermines between three burnells proper, the maternal arms of Roger Wyke which he adopted in lieu of his paternal arms of Wyke

Roger Wyck (died c.1467) (alias Wykes, Wycke, Wick, Wicks, Weeke, etc.) of Bindon in the parish of Axmouth in Devon, was a Member of Parliament for Plympton Erle (UK Parliament constituency) in 1413.

== Origins ==
He was a younger son of William Wyke of North Wyke in the parish of South Tawton in Devon, by his wife Katherine Burnell, daughter and heires of John Burnell of Cocktree in the parish of South Tawton. He inherited much of his mother's property and "no doubt for this reason" he adopted his maternal canting arms of Burnell Argent, a chevron ermines between three burnells proper (where burnells are a type of bird, probably Barnacle geese) in lieu of his paternal arms of Wyck, which continued to be borne by his elder brothers.

== Early origins ==
North Wyke was long a possession of the Wykes family. Worthy (1896) suggested this family, Latinized to de Wigornia ("from Worcester"), was descended from a certain William de Wigornia, a younger son of Robert de Beaumont, Count of Meulan (c.1142-1204) and de jure Earl of Worcester, by his marriage with Maud FitzRoy, daughter of Reginald de Dunstanville, 1st Earl of Cornwall. The manor of South Tawton was anciently a possession of the Beaumont family.

== Career ==
He was close to the Courtenay family, Earls of Devon and feudal barons of Plympton, and it is likely he was elected as an MP for Plympton due to their influence over that pocket borough. It is possible that Wycke himself was the catalyst for the Bonville–Courtenay feud which erupted in Devon and which ended in the Battle of Clyst Heath (1455). He certainly had some involvement as in 1427 he petitioned the Court of Chancery to try Bonville for assault, claiming he had broken into his property at Axmouth and had stolen goods worth £20. In May 1451 he was summoned to appear in the Court of Chancery and in 1454 he provided securities in Chancery that Thomas de Courtenay, 5th/13th Earl of Devon (1414–1458) would appear before the King's Council, "undertaking on the same occasion that Courtenay would curb his hostile behaviour towards Lord Bonville".

== Marriage and children ==
At some time before 1422 he married Joan Bingham (d.1462/3), widow of Thomas Cayleway (alias Kelloway), daughter and heiress of ..... Bingham, of Sutton Bingham in Somerset, and eventual heiress of her grandfather Sir Walter Romsey. Wykes inherited several former Bingham estates from his wife's paternal lands, including the manor of Sutton Bingham and the advowson of its church, to which he made presentations eight times between 1422 and 1467. He inherited even more property due to her inheritance from her grandfather Sir Walter Romsey, including estates in Dorset, Hampshire, Wiltshire and Somerset. Rockbourne in Hampshire appears to have been the most important of these estates, which involved Wyke in several lawsuits brought by claimants from other Romsey descendants. By his wife he had one son and heir:

- John Wykes, of Bindon, whose wife was of the Camill family of Shapwick. John's younger grandson Richard Wyke became the eventual heir but died with no sons, leaving four daughters and co-heiresses. The youngest of whom was Mary Wyke, heiress of Bindon and Charborough in Dorset, which she brought to her husband Walter Erle (d.1581), an officer of the Privy Chamber to King Edward VI and to Queens Mary and Elizabeth, whose descendant Richard Grosvenor Plunkett-Ernle-Erle-Drax (born 1958), MP, remains seated at Charborough House, the ancient Wyke possession.

== Landholdings ==
In 1406 he purchased the manor of Bindon in Axmouth, from Nicholas Bach, which he made his seat. It later became a seat of his descendants the Erle family "with fayre demesnes thereunto belonginge". Much of Wyke's original mansion house survives, including the chapel for which he was licensed by the Bishop of Exeter in 1425.

== Death ==
Wyck probably died before September 1467, and is last mentioned in surviving records in June 1467.

== Sources ==
- Woodger, L.S., biography of Wyke, Roger (d.c.1467), of Bindon in Axmouth, Devon, published in History of Parliament: House of Commons 1386-1421, ed. J.S. Roskell, L. Clark, C. Rawcliffe., 1993
- Wykes-Finch, Rev., The Ancient Family of Wyke of North Wyke, Co. Devon, published in Transactions of the Devonshire Association for the Advancement of Science, Literature, and Art, 1903, Vol.35, pp. 360–425
- Worthy, Charles, Devonshire Wills: Wykes of North Wyke, 1896
