= Bindon, Axmouth =

Historic manor in Devon, England

Coordinates: 50.7092°N 3.0344°W

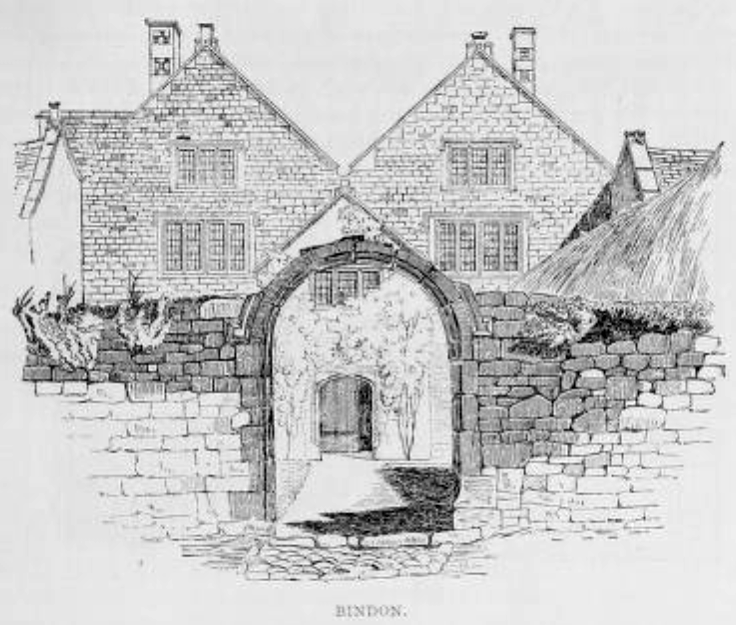
Bindon manor house, drawing by Roscoe Gibbs, 1888

Bindon is a historic manor, house and estate in the parish of Axmouth in Devon, England. The house is a grade II* listed building.

== History ==
Bindon was acquired from Nicholas Bach by Roger Wyke (died c. 1467) (alias Wykes, Wycke, Wick, Wicks, Weeke, etc.) a member of parliament for Plympton Erle (UK Parliament constituency) in 1413, a younger son of William Wyke of North Wyke in the parish of South Tawton in Devon. On 16 July 1425 he was licensed by Edmund Lacey, Bishop of Exeter to "have a chapel within his Manor House of Bindon, in the Parish of Axmouth," as is stated in the Episcopal register. Roger's great-grandson Richard Wyke died without male progeny, leaving four daughters and co-heiresses. The youngest of these was Mary Wyke who married Walter Erle (died 1581) of Colcombe in the parish of Colyton in Devon, an officer of the Privy Chamber to two wives of King Henry VIII, to his son King Edward VI and the latter's sisters Queen Mary I and Queen Elizabeth I. Erle purchased the manor of Axmouth following the Dissolution of Syon Monastery of which it had been a possession. Thus Bindon passed to the Erle family, with other former Wyke lands including Charborough in Dorset. After four further generations in the Erle family eventually it passed by a series of heiresses to the Drax family which sold it.

In 1962, the estate was purchased by Sir John Loveridge, the former Member of Parliament for the constituencies of Hornchurch (1970–1974) and Upminster (1974–1983). He died in 2007, but the estate remains in the ownership of his family.

== Manor house ==
The manor house dates from the 15th century, but was extensively rebuilt in the 16th century and has a mid-20th century extension. It has two stories plus attics and is constructed in stone rubble with freestone dressings and a slate roof.

== Sources ==
- Hamilton Rogers, William Henry, Memorials of the West, Historical and Descriptive, Collected on the Borderland of Somerset, Dorset and Devon, Exeter, 1888, pp. 375–82, Axmouth and Bindon
- Pole, Sir William (died 1635), Collections Towards a Description of the County of Devon, Sir John-William de la Pole (ed.), London, 1791, p. 124, Bindon
- Risdon, Tristram (died 1640), Survey of Devon, 1811 edition, London, 1811, with 1810 Additions, p. 26
- Pevsner, Nikolaus & Cherry, Bridget, The Buildings of England: Devon, London, 2004, p. 181
