= Beacon Villages =

Beacon Villages may refer to:

- A group of villages near Cosdon Beacon, Dartmoor, England:
  - Belstone
  - South Tawton
  - South Zeal
  - Sticklepath
- A group of villages near Ivinghoe Beacon, Chiltern Hills, England:
  - Cheddington
  - Ivinghoe
  - Marsworth
  - Pitstone
