= Ethel Katharine Pearce =

British entomologist and antiquary (1856–1940)

- Peirce sometime before 1931
- Born: June 11, 1856; Morden, Dorset
- Died: January 8, 1940 (aged 83)
- Occupations: Entomologist; Photographer; Journalist
- Notable work: Typical flies : a photographic atlas of Diptera, including Aphaniptera (1915-1928)

Ethel Katharine Pearce (1856–1940) was an English journalist, photographer and entomologist, particularly known for her work on Diptera.

== Early life ==
Pearce was born at Morden, Dorset on 11 June 1856, and christened on 13 July. Pearce's parents were Thomas Pearce, vicar of Morden (1820–1885), and Fanny Georgina Blake (1827–1919), who had married in 1852. Pearce had three brothers: Frank, Evelyn and Nigel (1862–1939) who was also an entomologist.

Pearce's parents set up the first school in Morden village when they arrived there in 1853, and her well-educated father often provided remedies and visits for the villagers, acting as a substitute for the nearest doctor, who lived five miles away.

Pearce had begun her natural history observations in childhood, saying that the abundant kingfishers, magpies, jays and rooks she had seen when young were no longer present at Morden as she neared eighty years old. Pearce's obituary in the journal Nature noted that in her early life "she had around her one of the finest entomological hunting grounds even in a county as favoured as Dorset."

Pearce trained as a journalist and although many of her pieces were published without attribution, she is known to have been on the staff of The Cambridge Examiner from 1884 and The Gentlewoman magazine from 1891 to 1913 as well as contributing to other women's and sporting magazines. Later in her life Pearce was a regular correspondent in the letters page of the Western Gazette, contributing scientific items such as a meteor sighting from Morden in April 1936 that was corroborated by other witnesses across the south west of England.

== "Typical Flies" and its reception ==
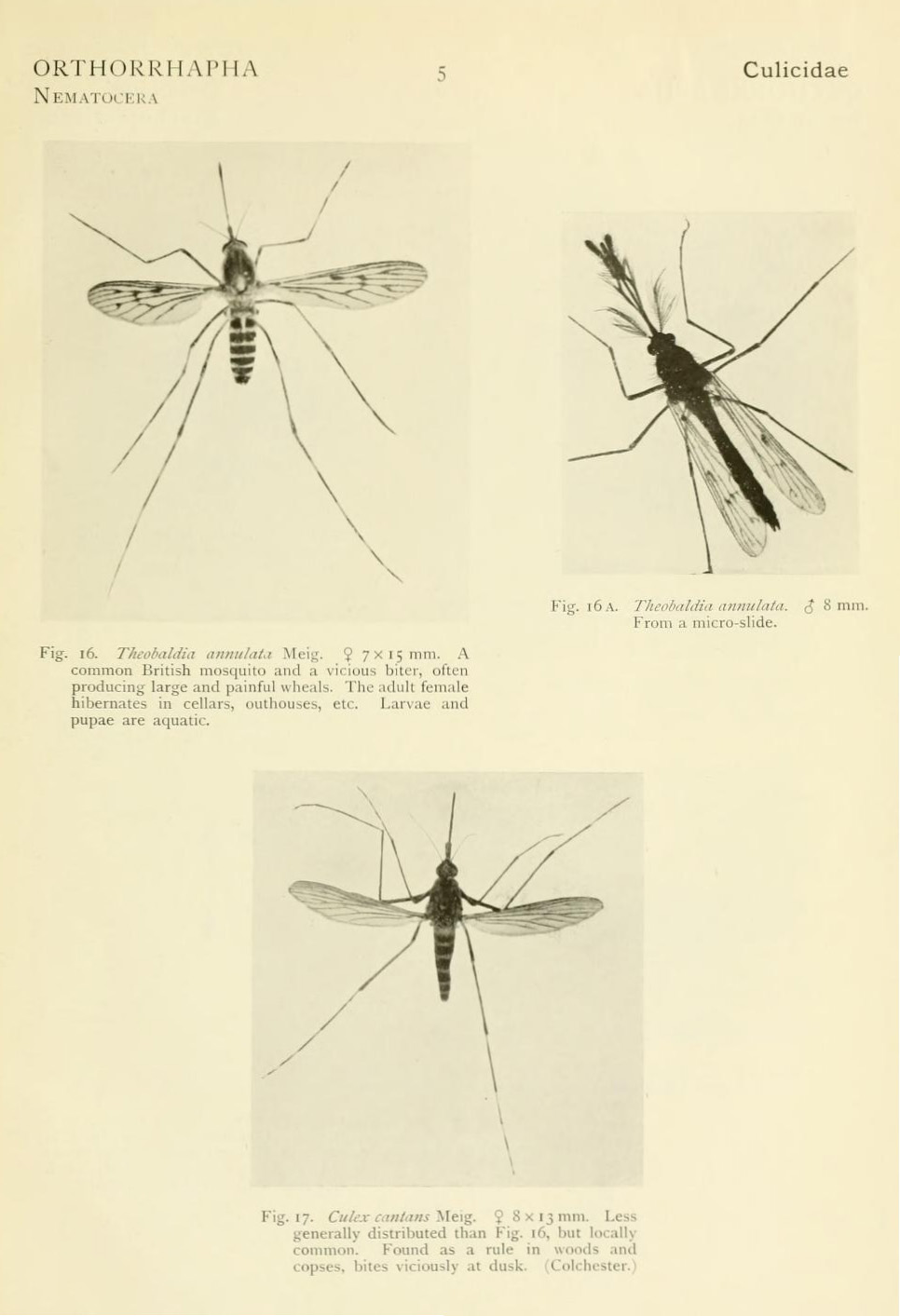
Figures 16, 16a and 17 from Ethel Katharine Pearce's first volume of Typical Flies (1915), showing mosquitoes from the suborder Nematocera

Pearce's Typical Flies was the first photographic guidebook published about flies. In the introduction to the first volume (1915) Pearce said her motivation for making the work was the relative lack of published information about Diptera, especially for beginner entomologists. In addition to Pearce's own collecting and observations she credited many other entomologists for their help, including her brother Nigel Pearce, George Nuttall, Cecil Warburton, and Frederick Theobald.

Pearce mounted fly specimens as flat as possible in order to facilitate a good photograph, and took pictures using her own 'stepped' method to achieve depth of field. Nigel Pearce had designed a camera bench for Ethel to facilitate precise camera movement (built by a carpenter). The captions for each photograph included remarks about known species habits.

Typical Flies was well-reviewed: as Pearce had published only her initials and surname on the title page, many reviewers assumed that the author was male, referring to "Mr Pearce." Likely because Pearce had previously worked for The Gentlewoman magazine, the book reviewer from The Gentlewoman was better informed about Pearce's identity, crediting 'an extremely clever treatise by Miss E.K. Pearce."

Pearce was elected a Member of the Royal Entomological Society in 1922, elected a Fellow of the Linnean Society in 1923 and elected a Fellow of the Zoological Society of London in 1924.

Pearce followed her first volume of Typical Flies with two more volumes including further Diptera families, published in 1921 and 1928.

== Death and legacy ==
Pearce died on 8 January 1940.

Pearce gifted use of her personal estate to her brother Frank and her servant Gertie Bartlett, the latter of whom she left financial support. Pearce was deaf later in life, and she thanked her friends and Bartlett in her will for assistance in making her deafness more manageable: "countless kindnesses that made my deafness seem nothing at all indeed my life a peaceful happy one." Pearce requested that her personal papers, and those of her late mother, be burned by her executors.

Pearce's collection of Diptera specimens and archive is today part of the collection at Oxford University Museum of Natural History.

== Selected works ==
1915: Typical Flies: A Photographic Atlas of Diptera, including Aphaniptera: [series 1]: Cambridge University Press

1915: Flies and Butterflies: Country Life: 24 July 1915: volume XXXVIII: issue 968: page 143

1916: Chrysops sepulchralis F., and Anthrax fenestratus Fln., in Dorsetshire: The Entomologist's Monthly Magazine: volume 52: page 208

1921: Typical Flies: A Photographic Atlas of Diptera: second series: Cambridge University Press

1928: Typical Flies: A Photographic Atlas of Diptera: series 1, second edition: Cambridge University Press
