= Walter Vaughan =

Walter Vaughan may refer to:

- Walter Vaughan (MP for Wiltshire)
- Walter Vaughan (MP for Carmarthenshire)
