= Charborough House =

Grade I listed English country house

Coordinates: 50°46′50″N 2°06′24″W

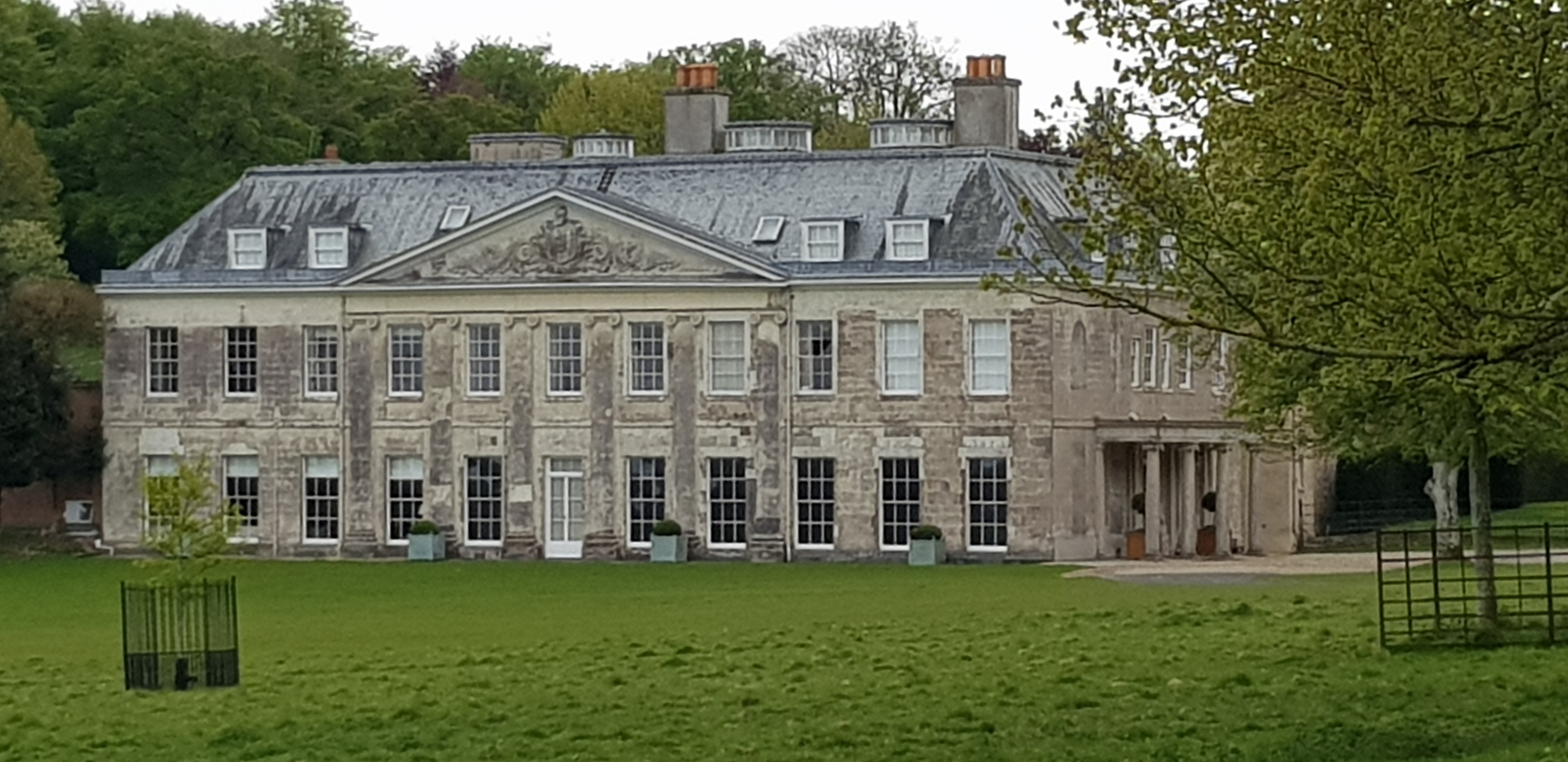
Charborough House

Charborough House, also known as Charborough Park, is a Grade I listed building, the manor house of the ancient manor of Charborough. The house is between the villages of Sturminster Marshall and Bere Regis in Dorset, England.

The grounds, which include a deer park and gardens, adjoin the villages of Winterborne Zelston, Newton Peveril and Lytchett Matravers: they are Grade II* listed in the National Register of Historic Parks and Gardens, and have been called the most splendid parkland in Dorset.

== Descent ==
The estate is listed as a manor in the Domesday Book of 1086.

=== Erle ===
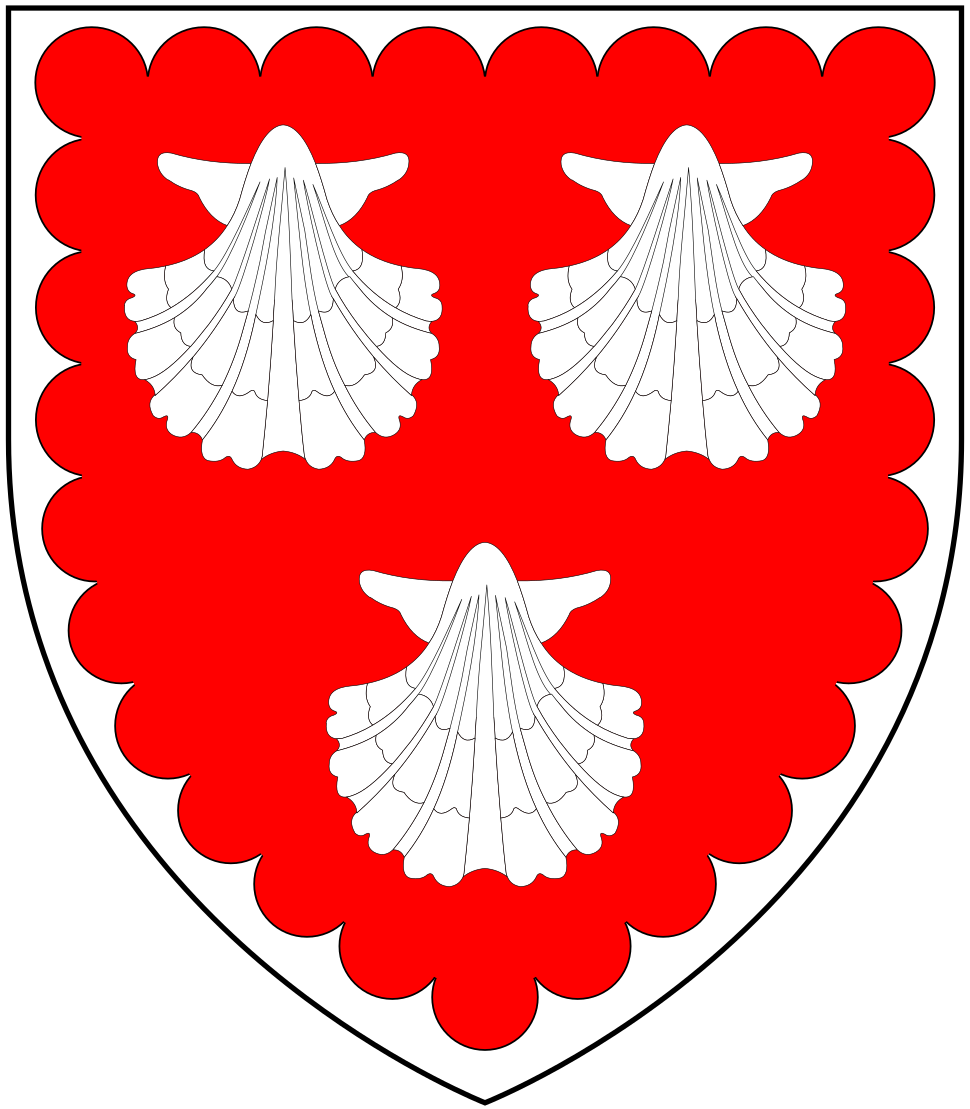
Arms of Erle: Gules, three escallops argent a bordure engrailed of the last

The Erle (alias Earl, Earle, etc.) family originated in east Devon and moved to neighbouring Dorset in about 1500, but died out in the male line on the death of General Thomas III Erle (1650–1720) without male progeny. His daughter and sole heiress Frances Erle (d.1728) married Edward Ernle, to which family the estate passed. Female heiresses subsequently brought the Erle/Ernle estates to owners with different family names.

==== Walter I Erle (c.1520–1581) ====
Charborough was acquired during the reign of Queen Elizabeth I (1558–1603) by Walter I Erle (c.1520–1581), an officer of the Privy Chamber to King Edward VI and to his sisters Queen Mary I and Queen Elizabeth I. He married Mary Weekes, one of the 5 daughters and co-heiresses of Richard Weekes of Bindon in the parish of Axmouth, Devon. Following the Dissolution of the Monasteries he purchased the manor of Axmouth, formerly a possession of Syon Abbey.

==== Thomas Erle (d.1597) ====
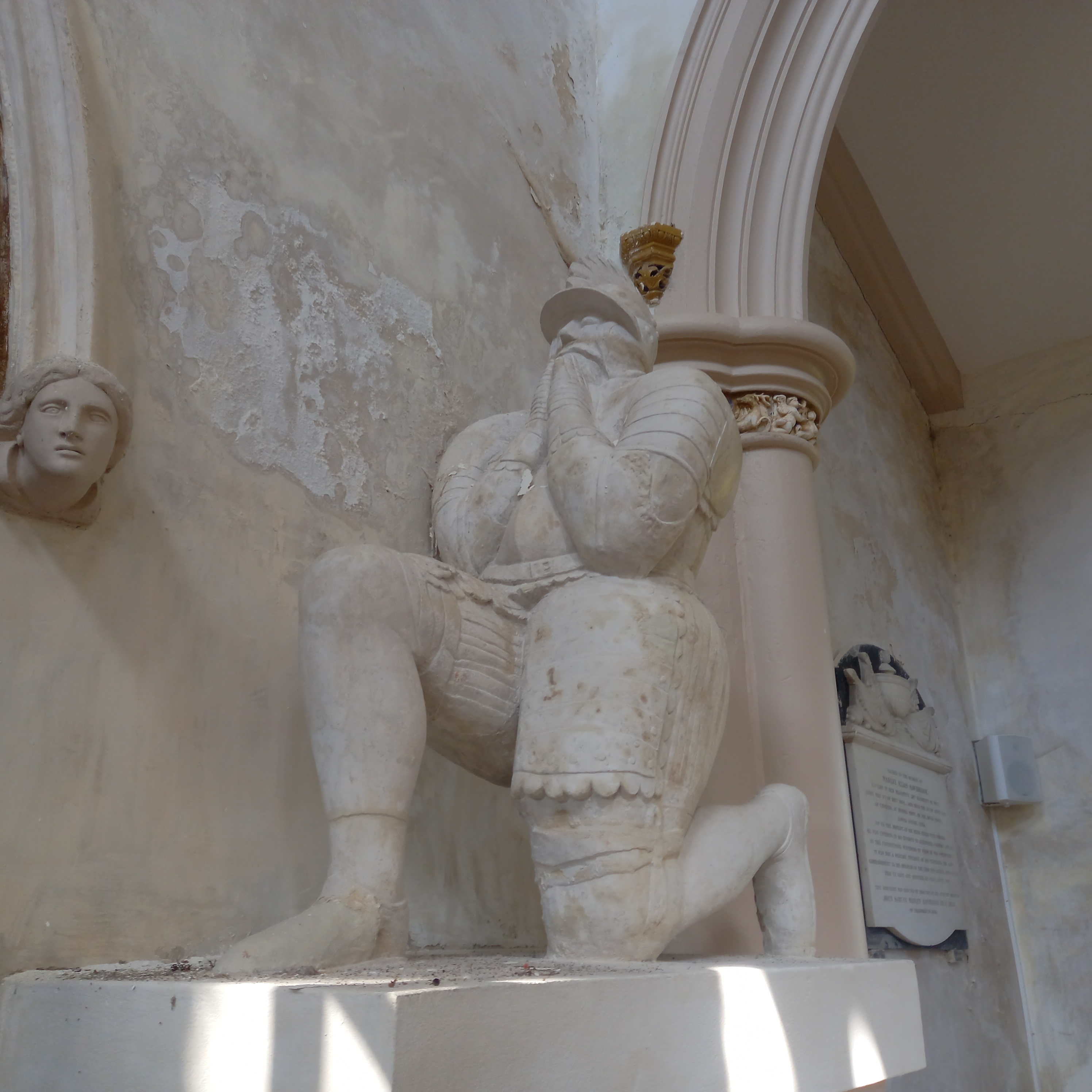
Effigy monument to Thomas Erle at St Mary's Church, Morden.

Thomas Erle (d.1597), eldest son, whose large effigy dressed in full-armour and kneeling on one knee in prayer, survives (re-positioned) in St Mary's Church, Morden, Dorset, the parish church of Charborough House. In 1581 at Shute in Devon, he married Dorothy Pole, a daughter of his father's near neighbour William Pole (1515–1587), Esquire, MP, of Shute House in the parish of Shute, near Colyton, Devon. Dorothy's brother was the Devon antiquary and historian Sir William Pole (1561–1635) whose principal seat was Colcombe House in the parish of Colyton, the former residence of Walter Erle of which mansion house and deerpark a lease had been granted to him by Queen Catherine Parr.

Pole describes various of the Erle family's landholdings in his work Collections Towards a Description of the County of Devon. Dorothy's mother was Katherine Popham (died 1588), the sister of John Popham (1531–1607), Lord Chief Justice. Dorothy survived her husband and remarried to Sir Walter Vaughan (c.1572–1639), of Falstone (alias Fallersdon) in the parish of Bishopstone, Wiltshire, Sheriff of Wiltshire in 1599–1600 and a Member of Parliament for Wiltshire in 1606. Thomas Erle commenced building a pier at Axmouth, which manor had been acquired by his father.

==== Col. Sir Walter Erle (1586–1665) ====
Col. Sir Walter Erle (1586–1665) of Charborough, eldest surviving son and heir, a Member of Parliament and a vigorous opponent of King Charles I in the Parliamentary cause both before and during the English Civil War. he married Ann Dymoke, a daughter of Francis Dymoke, and sister of Sir Henry Dymoke, and through her acquired the manors of Erckington and Pipe, Warwickshire, which he sold to Sir Walter Devereux, Baronet.

==== Thomas Erle (1621–1650) ====
Thomas Erle (1621–1650), son, an MP in the Long Parliament with his father. he served as a Member of Parliament for Milborne Port in the Short Parliament and for Wareham (a pocket borough controlled by his family) for the Long Parliament in November 1640. He married Susanna Fiennes, a daughter of William Fiennes, 3rd Viscount Saye and Sele.

==== Lt-Gen. Thomas Erle (1650–1720) ====
Lieutenant-General Thomas Erle (1650–1720), PC, son, Governor of Portsmouth and a Lieutenant-General of the Ordnance. He was elected a Member of Parliament for Wareham (a pocket borough controlled by his family) in 1679 (twice), 1681, 1685 and 1689 and in 1685 he was made Deputy Lieutenant of Dorset. He was a main promoter of the Glorious Revolution as in 1686 he hosted a group of conspirators who met at Charborough House to plan the overthrow of "the tyrant race of Stuarts". This meeting led to the Invitation to William, signed by the Immortal seven.

In 1675 he married Elizabeth Wyndham (died 1710), a daughter of Sir William Wyndham, 1st Baronet of Orchard Wyndham in Somerset. After his retirement from the military he made alterations to Charborough House, including the addition of a new staircase hall with mural paintings by Sir James Thornhill, and the laying out of a formal garden on the west side. He died without male progeny, when his heiress became his daughter Frances Erle (d.1728), who married Sir Edward Ernle, 3rd Baronet (c.1673–1729). Charborough House thus passed to the Ernle family.

=== Ernle ===
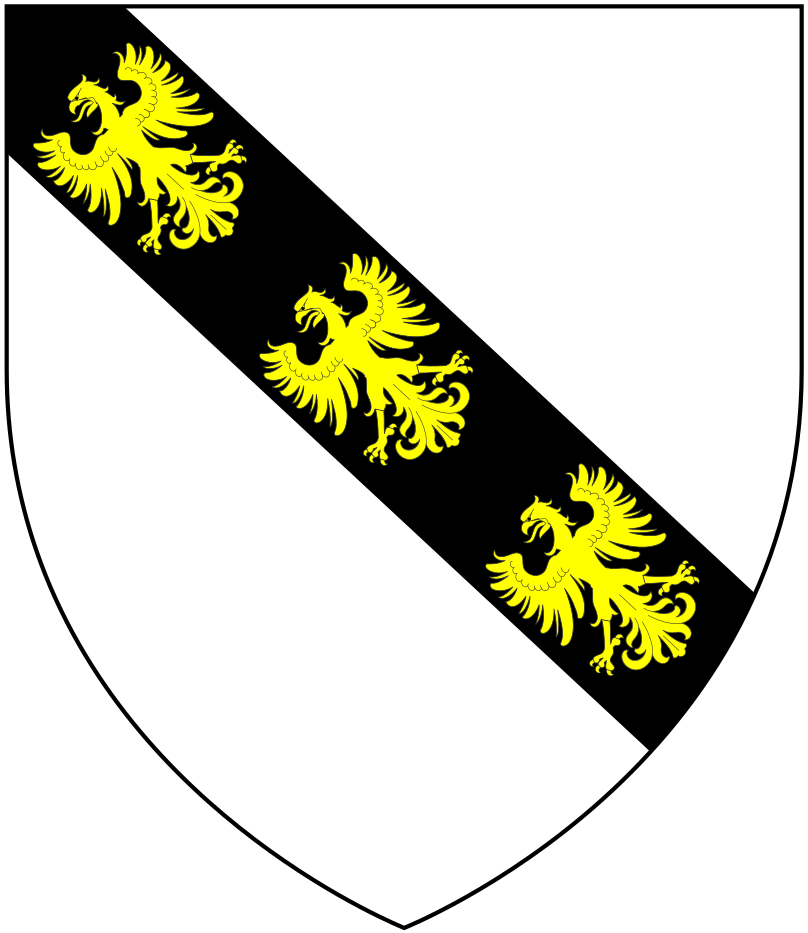
Arms of Ernle: Argent, on a bend sable three eagles displayed or

==== Sir Edward Ernle, 3rd Baronet (c.1673–1729) ====
Sir Edward Ernle, 3rd Baronet (c.1673–1729) of Etchilhampton, married Frances Erle (d.1728), heiress of Charborough, but died without male progeny, leaving a daughter and heiress Elizabeth Ernle, wife of Henry Drax (c.1693–1755).

=== Drax ===
Arms of Drax: Chequy or and azure, on a chief gules three ostrich feathers in plume issuant of the first

Henry Drax (c.1693–1755) of Ellerton Abbey in Yorkshire, a Member of Parliament, in about 1719 married Elizabeth Ernle, his first cousin and heiress of Charborough. He was the son of Thomas Shatterden, of Pope's Common, Hertfordshire, by his wife Elizabeth Drax. Thomas changed his surname to Drax, having become the heir of his wealthy childless uncle Col. Henry Drax, a sugar planter of Drax Hall in Barbados and of Ellerton Abbey. Henry Drax was a favourite of Frederick, Prince of Wales, whose secretary he became. Drax built a new wing onto Charborough House to accommodate the Prince during his visit in 1741.

==== Thomas Erle Drax (c.1721–1789) ====
Thomas Erle Drax (c.1721–1789), son, a Member of Parliament for Wareham and Corfe Castle. In 1754 he married Mary St. John, a daughter of John St John, 11th Baron St John (d.1757) of Bletso, but died without progeny and was succeeded by his brother Edward Drax. In 1775 he rebuilt the parish church next to Charborough House.

==== Edward Drax ====
Edward Drax of Charborough, brother, who in 1762 married Mary Churchill, a daughter of Awnsham Churchill of Henbury. He died without male progeny, leaving as his heiress his daughter Sarah Frances Drax, wife of Richard Grosvenor. In 1790 he built the pagoda-like ornamental tower, originally 80 feet high, extended in height after 1838.

=== Grosvenor ("Erle-Drax") ===
Arms of Grosvenor: Azure, a garb or

==== Richard Erle-Drax (d.1819) ====
Richard Grosvenor (d.1819), a Member of Parliament for West Looe in Cornwall, married Sarah Frances Drax (1769–1822), heiress of Charborough, and in consequence of his marriage he assumed the surname and arms of "Erle-Drax". He was a nephew of Richard Grosvenor, 1st Earl Grosvenor of Eaton Hall, Cheshire. In about 1810 he remodelled the house, probably to the designs of John Nash and laid out new gardens on the south side.

==== Richard Edward Erle-Drax (1797–1828) ====
Richard Edward Erle-Drax (1797–1828), only son, of Charborough and Ellerton Abbey, who died unmarried aged 31 and was succeeded by his sister Jane Frances Erle-Drax, wife of John Samuel Wanley Sawbridge.

=== Sawbridge ("Erle-Drax") ===
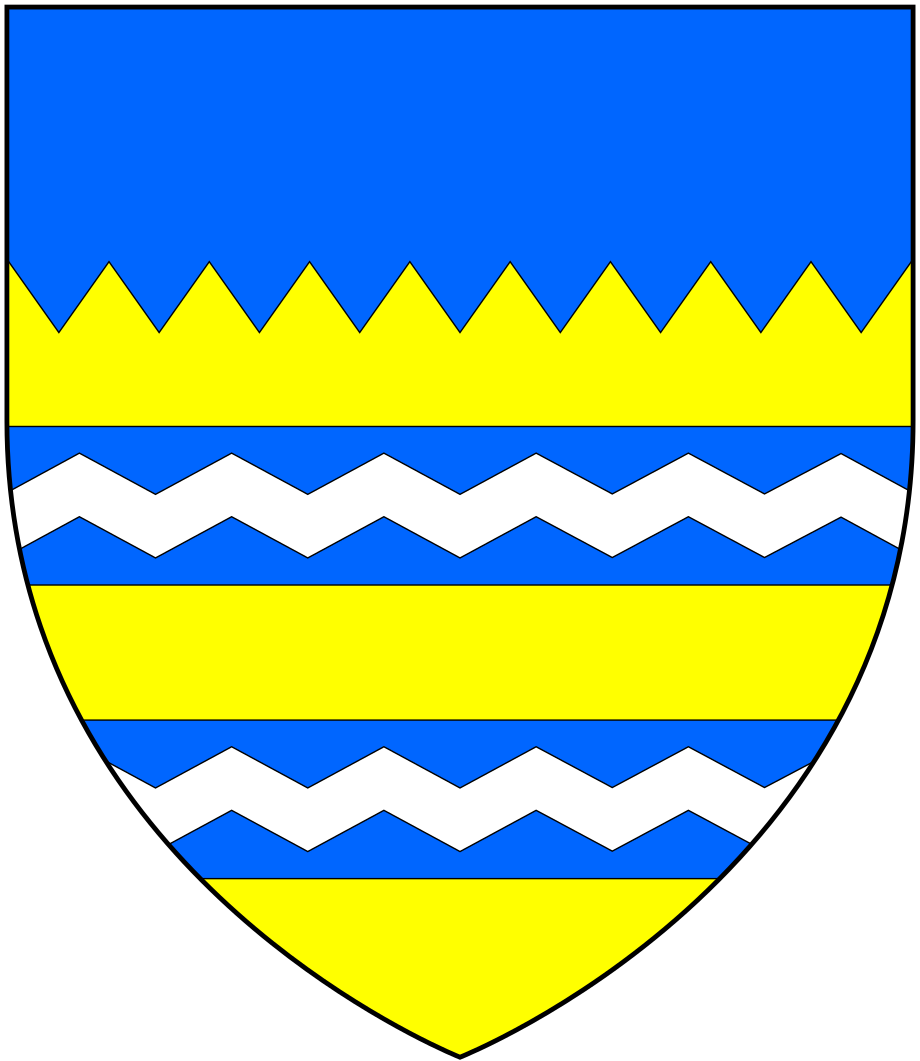
Arms of Sawbridge: Or, two bars azure each charged with a barrulet dancettée argent a chief indented of the second

John Samuel Wanley Sawbridge (d.1887), of Olantigh Towers in Kent, and Holnest House in Dorset, MP for Wareham, who in 1827 married Jane Frances Erle-Drax (d.1853), heiress of Charborough. He was descended from Jacob Sawbridge (d.1748) a director of the South Sea Company in the year of the South Sea Bubble of 1720, a Member of Parliament for Cricklade in Wiltshire, who purchased the estate of Olantigh from the Thornhill family. In consequence of his marriage he assumed the surname and arms of "Erle-Drax". He was Master of the Blackmore Vale Hunt and ordered its members to dress in yellow coats with blue collars instead of the usual scarlet, and mounted the hunt staff on grey horses. He spent money prodigiously on Charborough, including the building of the famously long boundary wall of the park, said to incorporate about two million bricks; he also built the "Stag Gate" and the "Lion Gate" entrances to the park.

In 1838 he rebuilt the ornamental tower which had been struck by lightning and extended its height from 80 to 120 feet. At Olantigh he built large picture galleries for his art collection, and added Venetian-style towers and a grand fountain in the gardens. He built for himself a huge mausoleum next to Holnest Church in Dorset, since demolished by his descendants due to its high maintenance costs. He died without male progeny, when his paternal estates descended by tail male to his nephew, but his wife's Charborough estates descended to his two daughters as co-heiresses:

- Maria Caroline Sawbridge-Erle-Drax, eldest daughter, who died unmarried, having inherited her mother's estates. Her heir was her younger sister:
- Sarah Charlotte Elizabeth Ernle-Erle-Drax, who in 1853 married Col. Francis Augustus Plunkett Burton.

John Samuel Wanley Sawbridge Erle Drax, profited significantly from slavery. In 1834 one hundred and eighty-nine enslaved persons were registered at Drax-Hall in Barbados by Forster Clarke, as the attorney to B. (J. ?) S. W. Sawbridge Erle Drax, which on 16 May 1836 resulted in the payment of £4,293 in compensation under the 1833 Slavery Abolition Act.

=== Burton ===
==== Col. Francis Augustus Plunkett Burton (d.1865) ====
Col. Francis Augustus Plunkett Burton (d.1865) married Sarah Charlotte Elizabeth Ernle-Erle-Drax, the heiress of Charborough. He was the son of Admiral James Ryder Burton by his wife Anne Maria Plunkett, daughter of Randal Plunkett, 13th Baron of Dunsany (1739–1821). He died without male progeny leaving as his heiress his only daughter Ernle Elizabeth Louisa Maria Grosvenor Burton. In 1871, she married as her second husband Lt. John Lloyd Egginton, of the 3rd Dragoon Guards, of Cheltenham, eldest son of Rev. John Clemson Egginton of Bilbrook, Staffordshire.

=== Egginton ("Ernle-Erle-Drax") ===
==== Lt. John Lloyd Egginton ====
Arms of Egginton of Kingston-Upon-Hull and of Charborough House: Argent, six eaglets 3,2 & 1 sable a chief nebulee azure As seen impaling Earle and Drax quarterly in the Turberville Window in Bere Regis Church, Dorset, heraldically describing the descent of Charborough and Bere Regis

Lt. John Lloyd Egginton married Ernle Elizabeth Louisa Maria Grosvenor Burton (d.1905), heiress of Charborough. On 6 August 1887 the couple assumed by royal licence the surname and arms of "Ernle", and by a further royal licence on 27 September 1887 assumed the additional surnames of "Erle" and "Drax". he died without male progeny, leaving as his heiress his only daughter Ernle Elizabeth Louisa Maria Grosvenor Plunkett Ernle-Erle-Drax (d.1916), heiress of Charborough, of Bere Regis in Dorset, of Ellerton Abbey, of Maddington House in Wiltshire, of Swell Court in Somerset, and of Caesar's Camp in Surrey. In 1877 she married her distant cousin John Plunkett, 17th Baron of Dunsany (1853–1899)

=== Plunkett (Plunkett-Ernle-Erle-Drax) ===
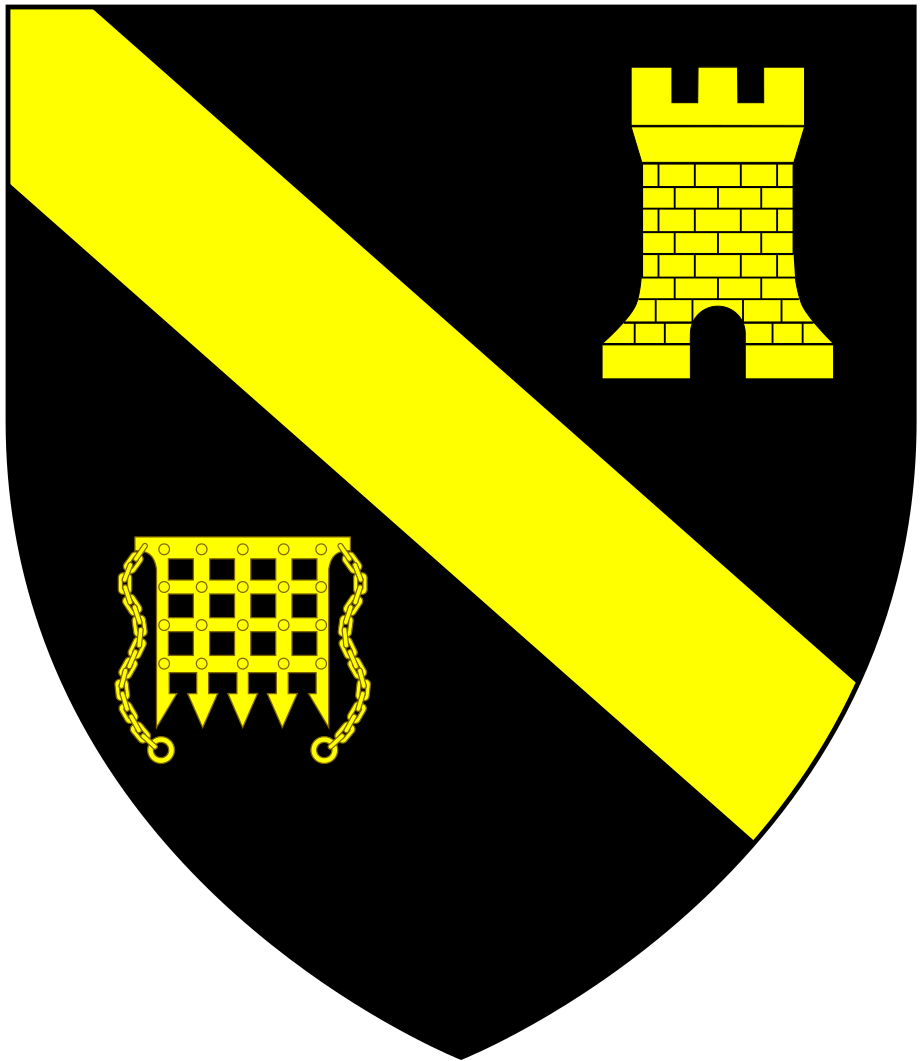
Arms of Plunket: Sable, a bend between in sinister chief a tower and in dexter base a portcullis all or

==== John William Plunkett, 17th Baron of Dunsany (1853–1899) ====
John Plunkett, 17th Baron of Dunsany (1853–1899) married Ernle Elizabeth Louisa Maria Grosvenor Plunkett Ernle-Erle-Drax (d.1916), heiress of Charborough. In 1905 having succeeded her mother in the Charborough estates she assumed by royal licence dated 1905 the additional name and arms of "Ernle", and by a further royal licence dated 20 December 1905 assumed the name and arms of "Erle" and "Drax" in addition to and after those of Plunket-Ernle. Her eldest son was Edward John Moreton Drax Plunkett, 18th Baron of Dunsany (1878–1957), an officer in the Coldstream Guards, who in 1904 married Lady Beatrice Child Villiers, a daughter of Victor Child Villiers, 7th Earl of Jersey (1845–1915), by whom he had issue. However his mother bequeathed Charborough and her other estates to her second son Reginald Aylmer Ranfurly Plunkett.

==== Sir Reginald Plunkett-Ernle-Erle-Drax (1880–1967) ====
The Turberville Window in Bere Regis Church, Dorset, heraldically describing the descent of the manor of Bere Regis, from the Turberville family to the Earle family and its heirs, the descent from the latter family being the same as for Charborough. The left-most 3 3/4 lancets deal with the Turberville descent, the remainder with Earle and descendant families

Admiral the Hon. Sir Reginald Aylmer Ranfurly Plunkett-Ernle-Erle-Drax (1880–1967), of the Royal Navy, who inherited Charborough and Ellerton Abbey and other estates, including Drax Hall in Barbados, from his mother. By royal licence dated 4 October 1916 he assumed the additional surnames and arms of "Ernle", "Erle" and "Drax". He married Kathleen Chalmers, only daughter of Dr. Quintin Chalmers, MD.

==== Henry Walter Plunkett-Ernle-Erle-Drax (1928–2017) ====
Henry Walter Plunkett-Ernle-Erle-Drax (1928–2017), eldest son and heir, of Charborough. He married Hon. Pamela Weeks.

==== Richard Plunkett-Ernle-Erle-Drax ====
Richard Drax (born 1958) of Charborough, son and heir, Conservative Member of Parliament for South Dorset 2010-2024.

== Mansion house ==
The surviving mansion house is in the centre of the park and incorporates parts of the original house built by Sir Walter II Erle (1586–1665) (grandson of Walter I), Military Governor of Dorchester and a Parliamentarian commander during the Civil War, whose forces besieged Corfe Castle in 1646. Stone and timber were taken from Corfe for use in the house's construction. He fought for the international Protestant cause as a volunteer in the Dutch Army, and was present at the Siege of 's-Hertogenbosch in 1629. He was impressed by the Dutch fortifications and on his return home had the garden at Charborough "cut into redoubts and works" as he had seen. He also employed a Dutchman to make a decoy pool for duck shooting.

== Estate wall and entrances ==
Charborough Park is surrounded by one of the longest brick walls in England, comprising more than two million bricks and built between 1841 and 1842 by the then owner of the park John Samuel Wanley Sawbridge-Erle-Drax. He succeeded in having the new Wimborne/Dorchester turnpike moved further away from his house, a detour of over one-half mile (0.80 km), but unfortunately for Sawbridge-Erle-Drax — who was also its chief promoter and investor — the turnpike lost money, mainly because the railway between Wimborne and Dorchester opened shortly afterwards.

The park wall runs alongside the A31 road and is punctuated by Stag Gate at the northern extremity and Lion Lodge at the easternmost entrance, with heraldic symbols in Lithodipyra (Coade stone) created by Eleanor Coade's Artificial Stone Manufactory. These gateways are Grade II listed, as is a third one, East Almer Lodge, further to the west. A fourth gateway, Peacock Lodge, which is inside the current bounds of the estate, is Grade II* listed. The stag on top of 'Stag Gate' appears to have five legs, though one of these is instead an integral 'tree stump' that enhances the strength of the sculpture.

The Drax estate is thought to consist of nearly 7,000 acres (28 km^{2}), and the private grounds are open to the public once or twice a year, when local villagers sell tea and cakes.

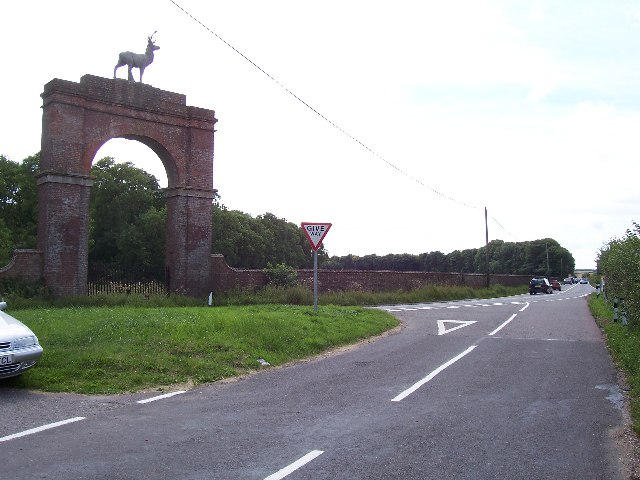
The Stag Gate on the A31 road to Dorchester

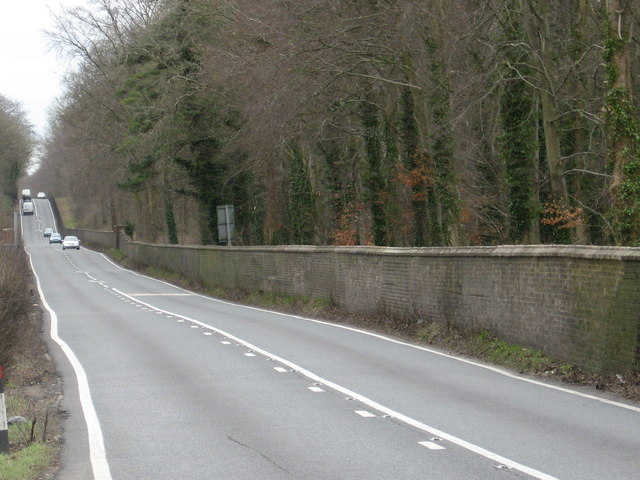
The estate boundary or "Drax Wall" along the A31 road

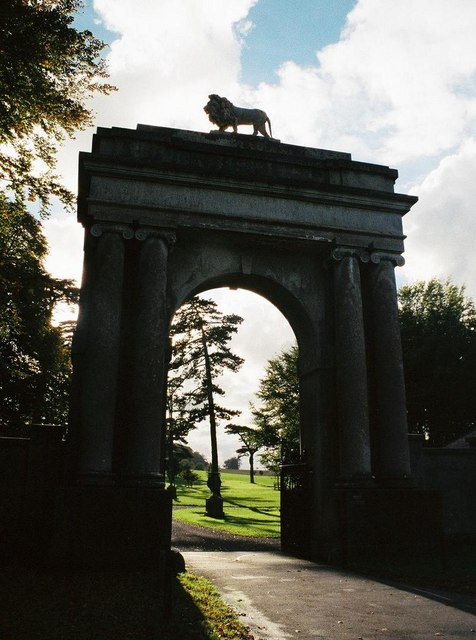
The gate at Lion Lodge

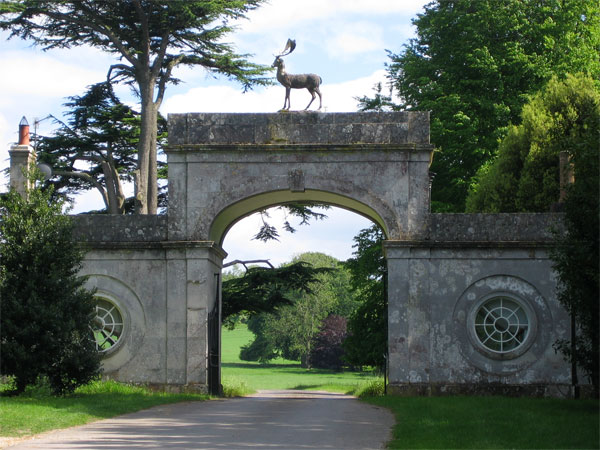
The Peacock Lodge gate, inside the estate boundary

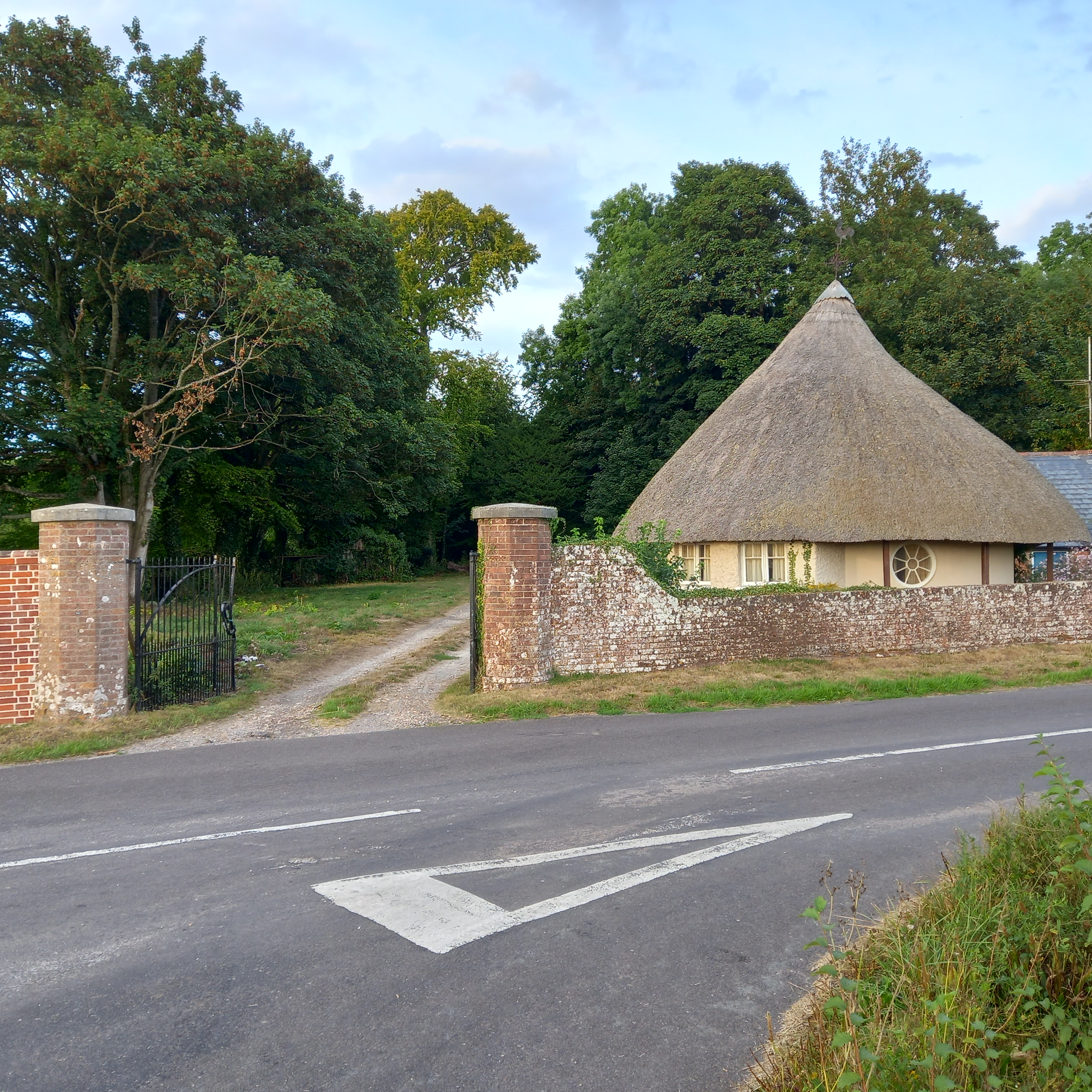
The Round Lodge gate on the southwest of the estate, by the B3075 road

== Thomas Erle ==
Thomas Erle c 1650–1720, served as MP for Wareham and a DL for Dorset. In 1686 he hosted a group of conspirators who met at Charborough House to plan the overthrow of "the tyrant race of Stuarts", which resulted in the overthrow of James II of England in 1688 by a union of Parliamentarians and the Dutch stadtholder William III of Orange-Nassau (Prince William of Orange). The meeting was effectively the start of the build-up to the Invitation to William, Prince of Orange, signed by the Immortal Seven, which resulted in the Glorious Revolution of 1688 which overthrew King James II in favour of the Dutch stadtholder Prince William III of Orange-Nassau, subsequently King William III of England.

Erle also served as Lord Justice of Ireland; MP for Cork in the Irish Parliament; Lieutenant-General of the Ordnance in Spain and France; and Governor of Portsmouth.

== Parliamentary representation ==
Family members who served as Members of Parliament for the family's pocket borough of Wareham include:
1679–1698, 1701–1718, Thomas Erle (born c. 1650, died 23 July 1720)
1701, 1704, 1710, 1722 Sir Edward Ernle (born c. 1673, died 31 January 1729)
1718, 1734, 1751, Henry Drax (born c. 1693, died 24 May 1755)
1747, 1754, 1761, Thomas Erle Drax (born c. 1721, died December 1789)
1755, Edward Drax (born c. 1726, died April 1791)
1841, 1859, 1868, John Samuel Wanley Sawbridge Erle-Drax (born 6 October 1800, died 7 January 1887).
The current owner, Richard Drax (born 1958), was Member of Parliament for South Dorset 2010–2024.
