= South Zeal =

Village in Devon, England

Coordinates: 50.72618°N 3.91309°W

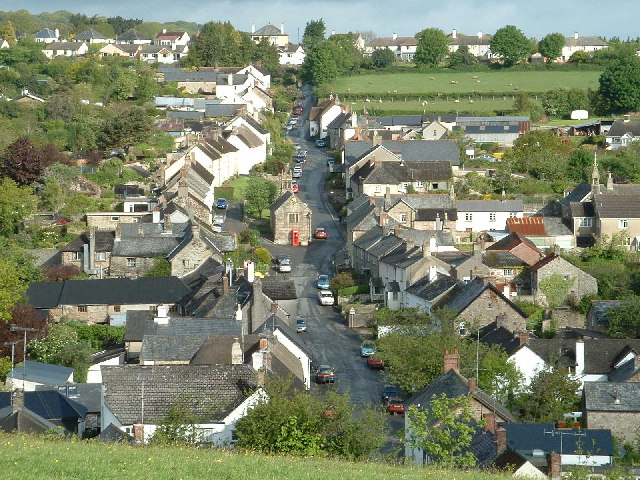
View of the village from the southeast, with St Mary's chapel in the centre

South Zeal is a village on Dartmoor, in Devon, United Kingdom.

It has a Church of England chapel and a Methodist chapel. The church is situated in the smaller South Tawton village, down the road, for which the parish is named. The differences have their basis in history when South Tawton was a manor and South Zeal was a village in that manor, where the manor hall was situated. The manor house, constructed around a former monastery which itself was built around a Neolithic standing stone called the South Zeal Menhir, is now the Oxenham Arms, an inn and hotel in the centre of the village.

Since 1981 it has been the site of the annual Dartmoor Folk Festival founded by local musician Bob Cann.

== Amenities ==
South Zeal contains South Tawton Primary School, which provides education to children in the area up to the age of 11.

The village is served by a post office, a bakery, Owlsfoot Garage and Meadowcroft Residential Home. The recreation ground is home to a play park as well as the skate park. It is also home to South Zeal United F.C. who have two men's senior teams that play in the Devon and Exeter football league.
