= Morden, Dorset =

Civil parish in Dorset, England

Coordinates: 50.756°N 2.122°W

Morden
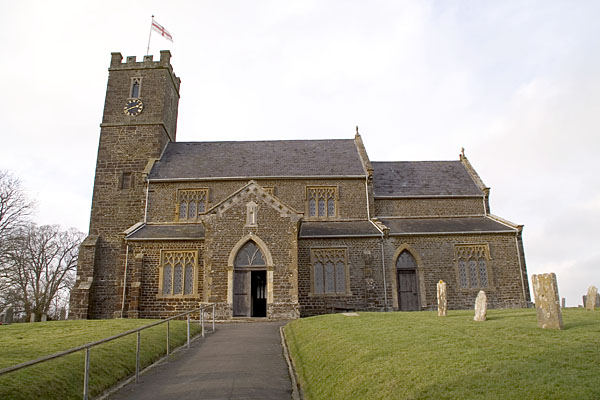
- St Mary's Church, Morden

- Location within Dorset
- Population: 323 (in 2011)
- OS grid reference: SY915952
- Unitary authority: Dorset
- Ceremonial county: Dorset
- Region: South West
- Country: England
- Sovereign state: United Kingdom
- Post town: WAREHAM
- Postcode district: BH20
- Police: Dorset
- Fire: Dorset and Wiltshire
- Ambulance: South Western
- UK Parliament: Mid Dorset and North Poole

Morden (otherwise Moreden) is a civil parish in south Dorset, England. Morden is about 6 miles (10 km) north-west of Poole. At the 2011 census the civil parish had 141 households and a population of 323.

As well as the village of Morden, the parish includes the hamlets of East Morden, West Morden and Whitefields.

St Mary's Church, Morden, was rebuilt in 1873 except for the lower part of the 13th-century tower. East Morden has a pub, the Cock & Bottle.

In the north of the parish, Charborough was anciently a separate manor, hamlet and ecclesiastical parish. The Grade I listed 17th-century mansion called Charborough House or Charborough Park stands in an extensive deer park, and near the house is the small parish church, also dedicated to St Mary, rebuilt in 1775 and Grade II* listed.
