= Walter Vaughan (MP for Wiltshire) =

English politician, died 1639

Sir Walter Vaughan (c. 1572 – 7 May 1639), of Falstone House, Bishopstone, Wiltshire, was an English politician. He was Sheriff of Wiltshire in 1599–1600 and a Member (MP) of the Parliament of England for Wiltshire from 1606 to 1614.

Vaughan inherited Welsh estates on the death of his father Thomas Vaughan in 1584, while still a minor. In 1597 he inherited the Wiltshire manor of Falstone, near Salisbury, from his great-uncle Charles who had been surveyor of the estates of the 1st and 2nd earls of Pembroke. Falstone manor house became his principal residence, and he was soon appointed Sheriff of Wiltshire. He was knighted in 1603, and in 1606 was returned at a by-election to Parliament, where he made no recorded speeches. By 1611 he had been appointed deputy lieutenant of Wiltshire.

Arbella Stuart stayed for over a month from the end of October 1603, as the royal court moved from Winchester to Salisbury and Wilton. She returned to Hampton Court by 16 December.

As a zealous magistrate and deputy lieutenant, around 1624 he sentenced to death a number of soldiers who had deserted while en route through the county to Dover.

He was married three times. First to Anne Hannam; secondly (c.1592) Margaret Norton; thirdly (by 1597) Dorothy, widow of Thomas Erle. Charles, his eldest son by his first marriage, predeceased him and the estate passed first to Charles' widow Dorothy and then to the younger son, George, from the second marriage. George was Sheriff of the county in 1643.
