= North Wyke =

Grade I listed building in the United Kingdom

Coordinates: 50.7695°N 3.9013°W

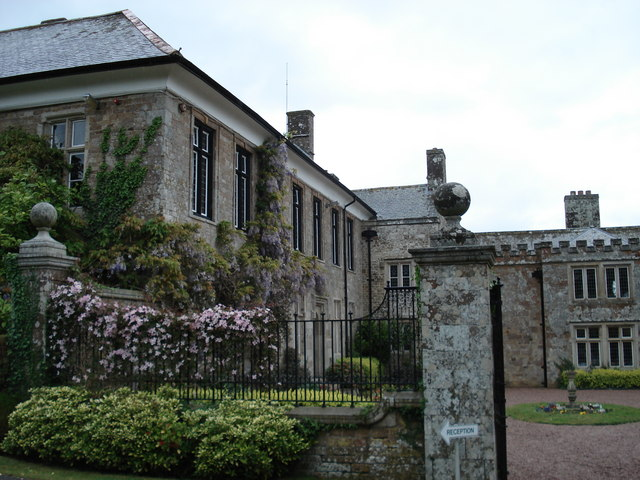
North Wyke manor house, today part of Rothamsted Research.

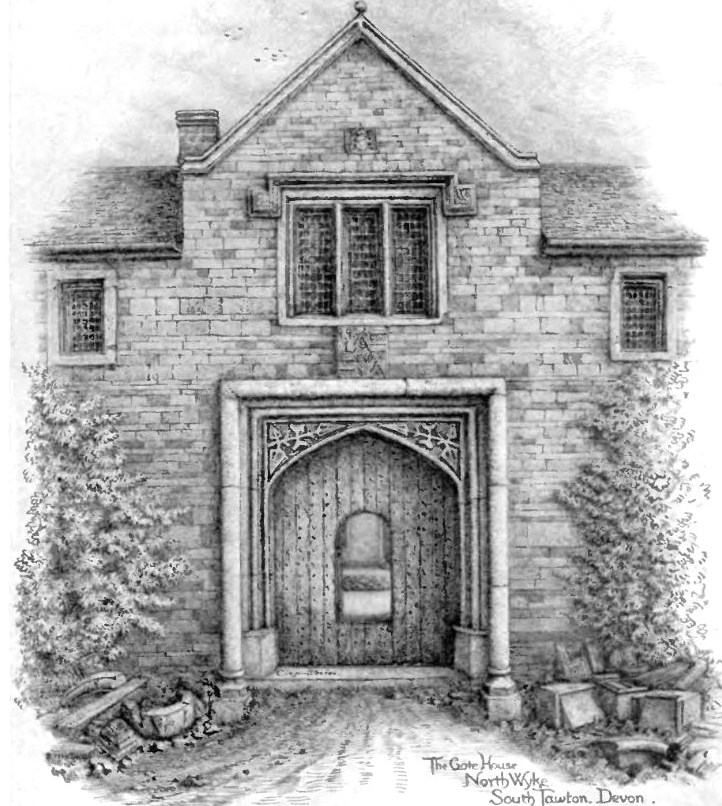
The Gate House, North Wyke, drawing from "A Book of Dartmoor" by Sabine Baring-Gould, 1907

North Wyke is an historic manor in the parish of South Tawton, Devon. The surviving grade I listed manor house, the original Devonshire seat of the Wyke (alias de Wray) family from the early 13th century to 1714, retains its basic mediaeval form, but was "improved and reconstructed" by Rev. William Wykes-Finch (d.1920) in 1904, historian and descendant (via a female line) of the Wyke family, to the design of G.H. Fellowes Prynne. Currently, the manor is part of Rothamsted Research's North Wyke site.

== History ==
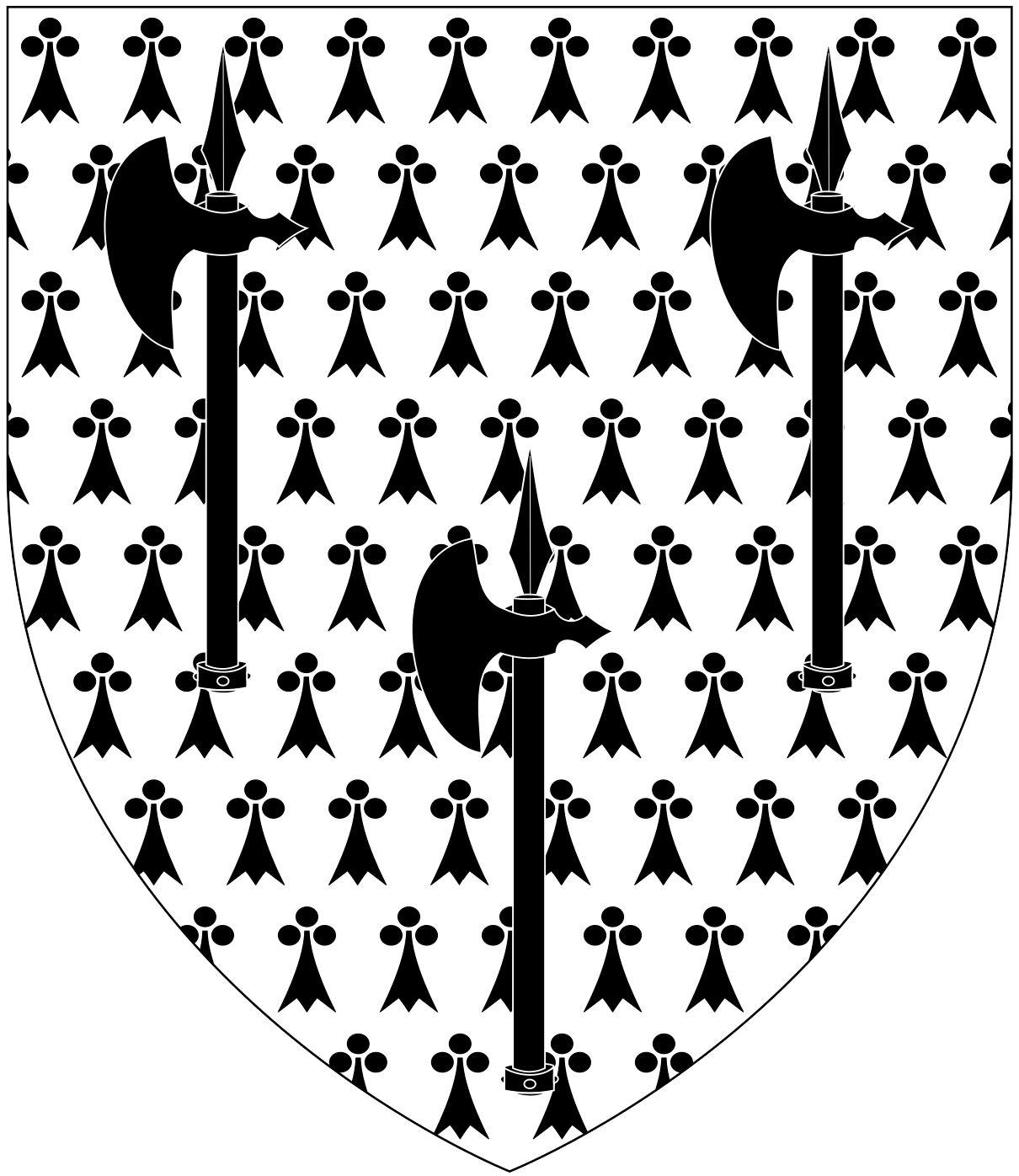
Arms of Wykes of North Wyke and of Cocktree, both in the parish of South Tawton: Ermine, three battle-axes sable. The similarity of these arms to those born by the prominent Wrey family later of Tawstock Court, North Devon, is suggested by Worthy (1896) to prove that they are "collateral kinsfolk of the Wykes".

North Wyke was long a possession of the Wyke family (alias Wykes, Wycke, Wick, Wicks, Weeke, etc.), which during the reign of King Richard II (1377-1399) changed its surname from "de Wray" to the name of its seat, "Wyke". Worthy (1896) suggested this family, Latinized to de Wigornia ("from Worcester"), was descended from a certain William de Wigornia, a younger son of Robert de Beaumont, Count of Meulan (c.1142-1204) and de jure Earl of Worcester, by his marriage with Maud FitzRoy, daughter of Reginald de Dunstanville, 1st Earl of Cornwall.

The manor of South Tawton was anciently a possession of the Beaumont family. The effigy of John Wykes (1520-1591) of North Wyke, known locally as "Old Warrior Wykes", survives in South Tawton Church, showing a recumbent figure dressed in full armour, under a low tester with three low Ionic columns. He married Mary Giffard, a daughter of Sir Roger Giffard (d.1547) of Brightley, Chittlehampton, Devon. In the chapel, a corbel survives sculpted with the arms of Wykes and Giffard.

The Westcountry author and historian Sabine Baring-Gould (d.1924) in his "Book of Dartmoor" (1907), relates the tale of "Wicked Richard Weekes" who died in 1670, and was involved in an escapade concerning fraudulent wills and mortgages.

Eventually, the estate was broken up into two farms, and the house divided into two. Shortly before 1907 it was repurchased by Rev. William Wykes-Finch (d.1920), descended from the Wyke family in a female line, and as reported by Sabine Baring-Gould in 1907 "the house is being restored in excellent taste". Wykes-Finch's son died in 1922 shortly after his father, and a cousin inherited the estate. It was sold in 1928 to Edwin Stanbury for £5,000. From 1929-1934 it was tenanted by the sculptor Alice Meredith Williams and her husband. In 1939 it was sold to Geoffrey Lupton, and in 1945 was sold to Captain N. Watson, who in 1955 sold it for about £30,000 to Fisons Ltd the fertiliser manufacturer, who established there a fertiliser research station. The house became offices and a hostel for visiting workers while the old stables became laboratories. In 1981 the Crown Estate Commissioners bought North Wyke and let it to the Institute of Grassland and Environmental Research, after which it became part of Rothamsted Research.

== Sources ==
- Wykes-Finch, Rev. W., MA, JP, The Ancient Family of Wyke of North Wyke, Co. Devon, published in Transactions of the Devonshire Association for the Advancement of Science, Literature, and Art, 1903, Vol.35, pp. 360–425
- Worthy, Charles, Devonshire Wills: Wykes of North Wyke, 1896
- Pole, Sir William (d.1635), Collections Towards a Description of the County of Devon, Sir John-William de la Pole (ed.), London, 1791, p. 427, "Northwike".
- Risdon, Tristram (d.1640), Survey of Devon, 1811 edition, London, 1811, with 1810 Additions, p. 290, "North Week".
- Baring-Gould, Sabine, "A Book of Dartmoor", 1907, pp. 151–155
- Vivian, Lt.Col. J.L., (Ed.) The Visitations of the County of Devon: Comprising the Heralds' Visitations of 1531, 1564 & 1620, Exeter, 1895, pp. 825–7, pedigree of "Wykes of Northwyke"
