= Charborough =

Hamlet in Dorset, England

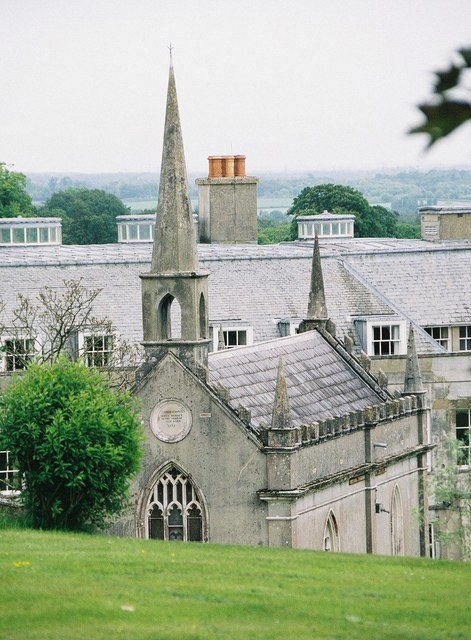
St Mary's Church, Charborough, behind which is seen part of Charborough House

Charborough is an historic former parish and manor in Dorset, England. It survives today as a hamlet, situated on an affluent of the River Stour, 6 miles west of Wimborne Minster, but without any of its former administrative powers, and is today part of the parish of Morden. The surviving former parish church is dedicated to Saint Mary. The manor house survives as Charborough House.

== St Mary's Church ==
The mediaeval church of the former parish of Charborough was situated to the immediate south-west of the manor house (in its latest form Charborough House). The mediaeval church was demolished and rebuilt on the same site (50°46′49″N 2°06′27″W) in 1775 in the Gothic Revival style, by Thomas Erle Drax, and dedicated to St Mary, and was remodelled in 1837 by John Sawbridge Erle-Drax who in 1826 had married the heiress Sarah Frances Erle-Drax of Charborough, and had assumed her surname and arms. It faces almost due east, as is usual, whilst the front facade of the house faces north-east. It is a grade II* listed building, but the listing relates only to its furnishings. Today it serves as a mausoleum and burial place for the Drax family, the functioning parish church being at Morden. Above the door of a small arched building nearby is an inscription, dated 1686, commemorating the meeting of the "Patriotic individuals who concerted the plan of the Revolution in 1688".

== Charborough Tower ==
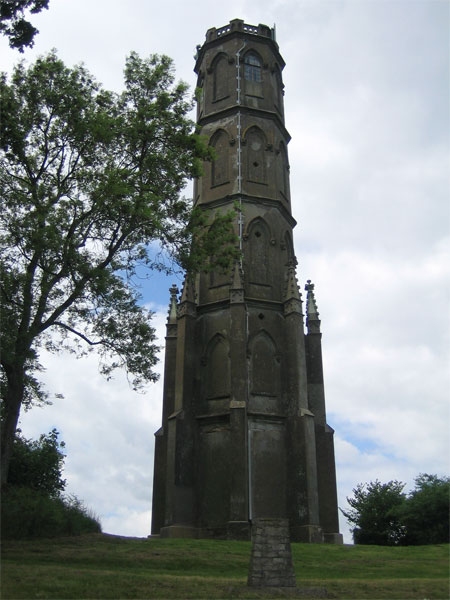
Charborough Tower

Charborough Tower is a Grade II* listed octagonal folly tower dating from 1790, extended in 1839 into a five-storey building. It is situated on a hill southeast of the house (50°46′39″N 2°06′06″W), with the vista of a triumphal way running between them.

Charborough with its tower is the model for "Welland House" in the novel Two on a Tower by Thomas Hardy.

== Descent of the manor ==
The manor is listed in the Domesday Book of 1086. It was later acquired during the reign of Queen Elizabeth I (1558–1603) by the Erle family whose eventual heiress Frances Erle married Sir Edward Ernle, 3rd Baronet (c.1673–1729). It descended by various further female lines to the present (notional) lord of the manor Richard Drax, the Conservative Member of Parliament for South Dorset since 2010, a member of the quadruple-barrelled surnamed family of Plunkett-Ernle-Erle-Drax. The Erle (alias Earl, Earle, etc.) family originated in east Devon and moved to neighbouring Dorset in about 1500, but soon died out in the male line. Female co-heiresses brought the Erle estates to various other families.
