= South Tawton =

Village in Devon, England

Coordinates: 50.73°N 3.9°W

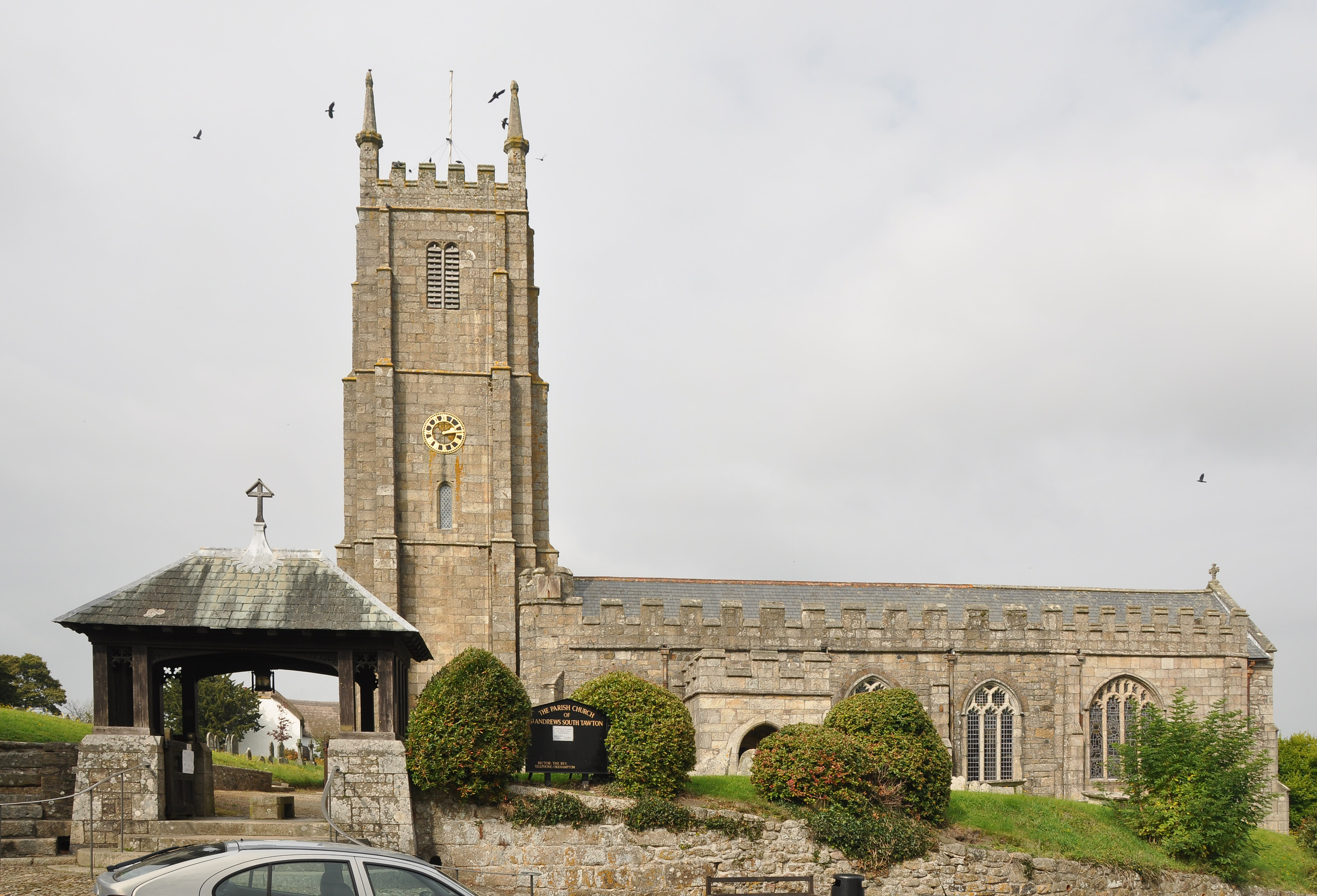
- St Andrew's Church

- Location within Devon
- Population: 1,683
- OS grid reference: SX653945
- District: West Devon
- Shire county: Devon
- Region: South West
- Country: England
- Sovereign state: United Kingdom
- Post town: Okehampton
- Postcode district: EX20
- Dialling code: 01837
- Police: Devon and Cornwall
- Fire: Devon and Somerset
- Ambulance: South Western
- UK Parliament: Central Devon (UK Parliament constituency)

South Tawton is a village, parish and former manor on the north edge of Dartmoor, Devon, England. An electoral ward bearing the same name exists. At the 2011 census the population was 1,683.

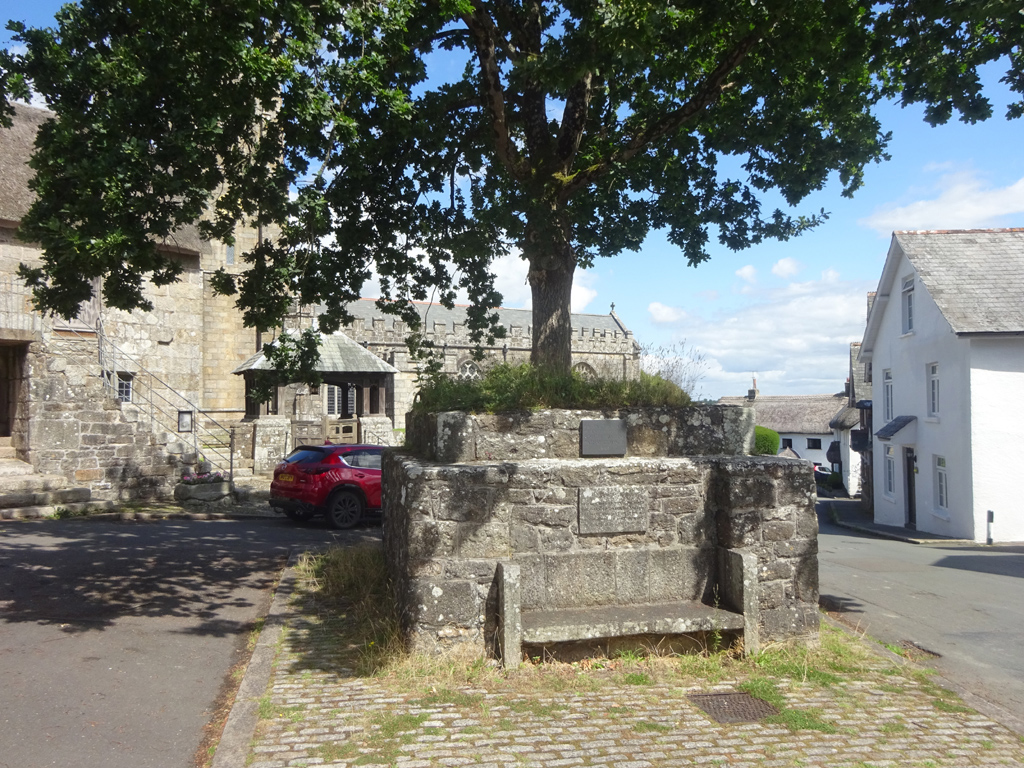
Cross Tree, South Tawton

In front of the church is a "Crosstree", a feature dating from the Tudor period.

Inscription: Cross Tree. a tree has stood here since the days of Queen Elizabeth I, the wall and seat were rebuilt to commemorate the coronation of Queen Elizabeth II in 1953

== Historic estates ==
Located in the parish of South Tawton are various historic estates including:

=== North Wyke ===
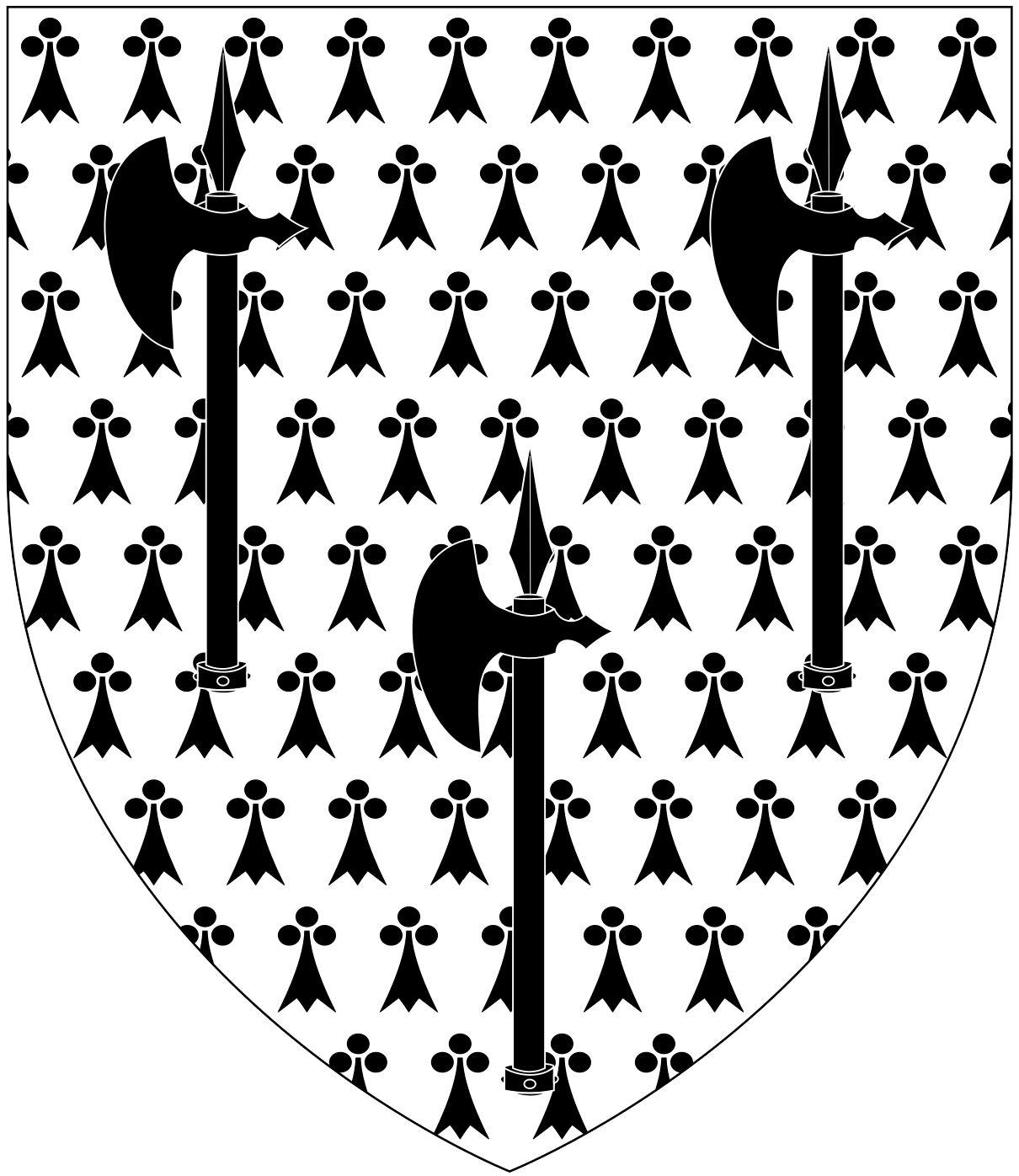
Arms of Wykes of North Wyke and of Cocktree, both in the parish of South Tawton: Ermine, three battle-axes sable. The similarity of these arms to those born by the prominent Wrey family later of Tawstock Court, North Devon, is suggested by Worthy (1896) to prove that they are "collateral kinsfolk of the Wykes".

North Wyke was long a possession of the Wykes family. Worthy (1896) suggested this family, Latinized to de Wigornia ("from Worcester"), was descended from a certain William de Wigornia, a younger sons of Robert de Beaumont, Count of Meulan (c. 1142-1204) and de jure Earl of Worcester, by his marriage with Maud FitzRoy, daughter of Reginald de Dunstanville, 1st Earl of Cornwall. The manor of South Tawton was anciently a possession of the Beaumont family. The effigy of John Wykes (1520-1591) of North Wyke, known locally as "Old Warrior Wykes", survives in South Tawton Church, showing a recumbent figure dressed in full armour, under a low tester with three low Ionic columns. He married Mary Giffard, a daughter of Sir Roger Giffard (d. 1547) of Brightley, Chittlehampton, Devon.

=== South Zeal ===
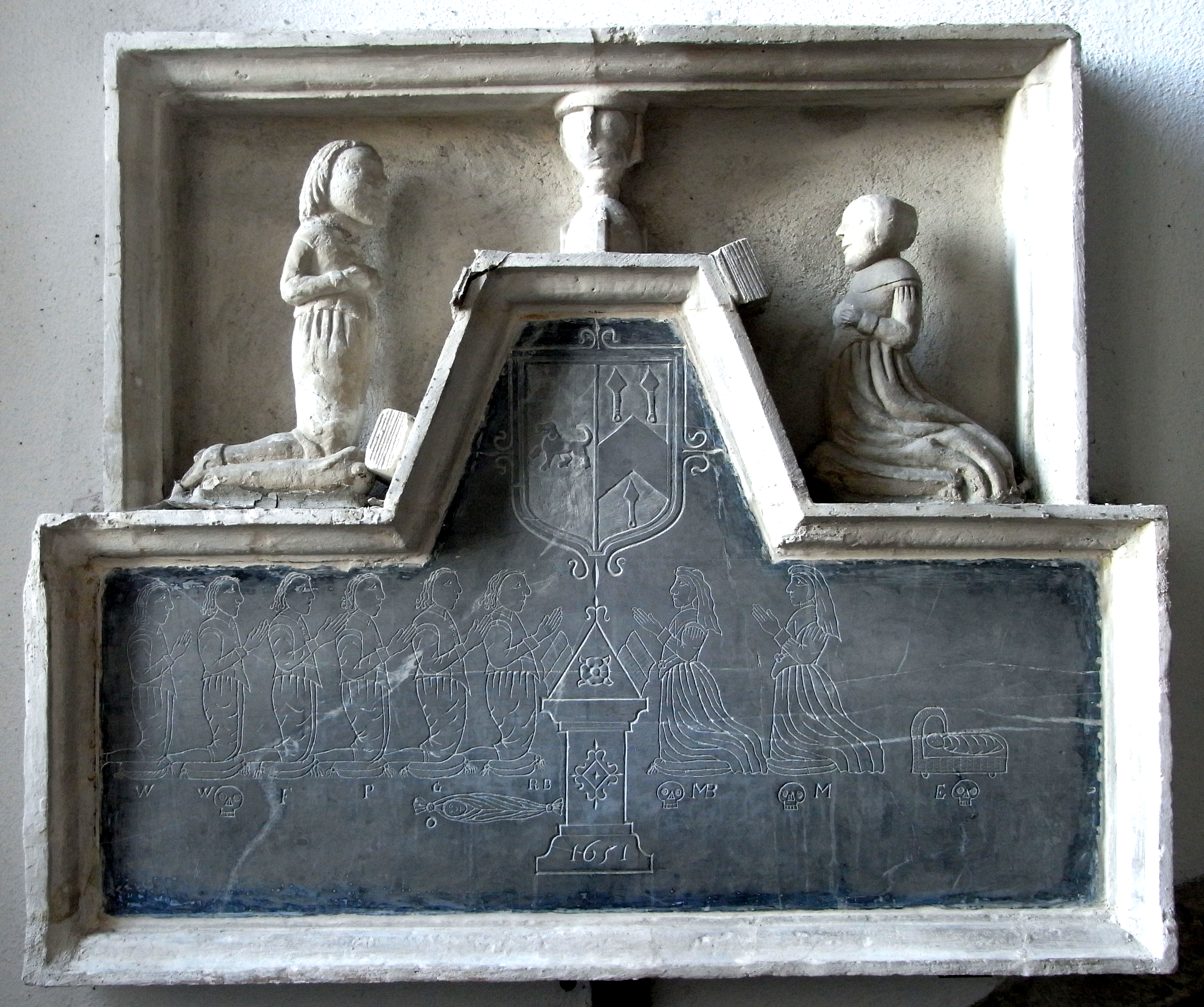
The Burgoyne Monument in St Andrew's Church South Tawton. This slate and stone tablet on the wall of the South Chapel is dated 1651 and is in memory of Robert Burgoyne, his wife and their family. Those who are commemorated include a child in a cradle and an infant in a shroud. The arms of Burgoyne are: Azure, a talbot argent (as shown on the monument to Thomas Chafe (d. 1648) in the church at St Giles in the Wood, Devon, who married a Burgoyne)

The manor house of the Burgoyne family of South Zeal survives as the Oxenham Arms Public House, on the main street of the village of South Zeal, which is within the parish of South Tawton. A mural monument to Robert Burgoyne, dated 1651, survives in St Andrew's Church, South Tawton.

== Climate ==
Since 1981, the highest recorded temperature was 33.9 °C (93.0 °F) on 3 August 1990 and the lowest was −11.0 °C (12.2 °F) on 22 December 2010.

Climate data for North Wyke (Note: Weather station is located 2.4 miles (3.9 km) from the centre of South Tawton.) (1991–2020 normals, extremes 1981–present)
Month	Jan	Feb	Mar	Apr	May	Jun	Jul	Aug	Sep	Oct	Nov	Dec	Year
Record high °C (°F)	15.6 (60.1)	16.7 (62.1)	20.5 (68.9)	23.6 (74.5)	31.6 (88.9)	33.4 (92.1)	32.5 (90.5)	33.9 (93.0)	28.9 (84.0)	26.1 (79.0)	17.5 (63.5)	16.9 (62.4)	33.9 (93.0)
Mean daily maximum °C (°F)	7.9 (46.2)	8.2 (46.8)	10.1 (50.2)	12.6 (54.7)	15.5 (59.9)	18.3 (64.9)	19.9 (67.8)	19.8 (67.6)	17.7 (63.9)	14.1 (57.4)	10.8 (51.4)	8.5 (47.3)	13.6 (56.5)
Daily mean °C (°F)	5.4 (41.7)	5.4 (41.7)	6.8 (44.2)	8.7 (47.7)	11.5 (52.7)	14.2 (57.6)	16.0 (60.8)	16.0 (60.8)	14.0 (57.2)	11.2 (52.2)	8.1 (46.6)	5.9 (42.6)	10.3 (50.5)
Mean daily minimum °C (°F)	2.9 (37.2)	2.6 (36.7)	3.6 (38.5)	4.9 (40.8)	7.4 (45.3)	10.1 (50.2)	12.1 (53.8)	12.3 (54.1)	10.4 (50.7)	8.2 (46.8)	5.5 (41.9)	3.4 (38.1)	7.0 (44.6)
Record low °C (°F)	−10.4 (13.3)	−9.5 (14.9)	−6.3 (20.7)	−3.4 (25.9)	−0.6 (30.9)	2.8 (37.0)	5.7 (42.3)	4.4 (39.9)	1.9 (35.4)	−1.9 (28.6)	−5.9 (21.4)	−11.0 (12.2)	−11.0 (12.2)
Average precipitation mm (inches)	118.7 (4.67)	90.0 (3.54)	79.1 (3.11)	66.6 (2.62)	65.2 (2.57)	61.8 (2.43)	60.0 (2.36)	70.4 (2.77)	71.0 (2.80)	113.1 (4.45)	118.4 (4.66)	129.2 (5.09)	1,043.4 (41.08)
Average precipitation days (≥ 1.0 mm)	15.9	13.3	12.9	11.3	10.6	9.8	10.2	11.5	10.7	15.3	16.9	16.8	155.2
Mean monthly sunshine hours	54.5	75.1	111.9	163.1	193.8	191.6	184.7	160.0	142.5	102.7	63.4	51.1	1,494.3
Source 1: Met Office
Source 2: Starlings Roost Weather

== Appearance in media ==
South Tawton features in Landscapes of England DVD Series 2, Ep 6. by W.G. Hoskins. He observes that while South Tawton failed as a borough it spawned the nearby settlement of South Zeal which flourished being directly on the main route from London to Lands End.
