= Ellerton Abbey House =

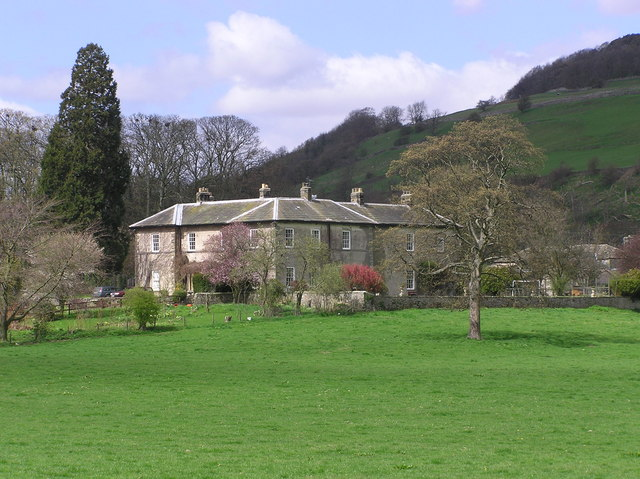
- The house in 2006, when it was a hotel. Viewed from the southeast

- Location within North Yorkshire
- 54.3708°N 1.88105°W
- Location: Ellerton Abbey, North Yorkshire, England

History
- Built: circa 1830

Site notes
- Area: Richmondshire
- Architectural style: Regency style

Listed Building – Grade II
- Designated: 7 December 1966
- Reference no.: 1179255

Ellerton Abbey House is an historic building and estate in Ellerton Abbey, North Yorkshire, England. It was built around 1830 for the Fore Erle-Drax family, and has been designated a Grade II listed building by Historic England. The property is located at the end of a long driveway off the northern side of the B6270 Richmond Road, about 450 feet (140 m) southwest of Ellerton Priory, now ruined.

As of 2021, the building is occupied by Ellerton Abbey Antiques and Mrs Pumphrey's Tearoom, the latter in reference to the character in the original version of the BBC television series All Creatures Great and Small who lived there with her spoiled Pekingese dog Tricki-Woo. Filming took place inside the house, which was named Barlby Grange in the series, and in its grounds.

== Drax family ==
Following the Dissolution of the Monasteries the Priory became the property of a series of people until it was purchased in the 1690s by Col. Henry Drax, a wealthy slave owner and sugar planter, of Drax Hall in Barbados, who was looking for an English estate which would produce £10,000 per annum. His heir was his nephew Thomas Shatterden, of Pope's Common, Hertfordshire, son of his sister, who in accordance with the bequest adopted the surname Drax in lieu of his patronymic. His eldest son and heir was Henry Drax (c.1693–1755), a Member of Parliament and a favourite of the Prince of Wales, who married Elizabeth Ernle, heiress of Charborough House in Dorset, which today remains the residence of his descendant Richard Drax, MP.

John Samuel Wanley Swabridge Erle-Drax built the house for his wife, Jane Frances, around 1830.

== Gallery ==
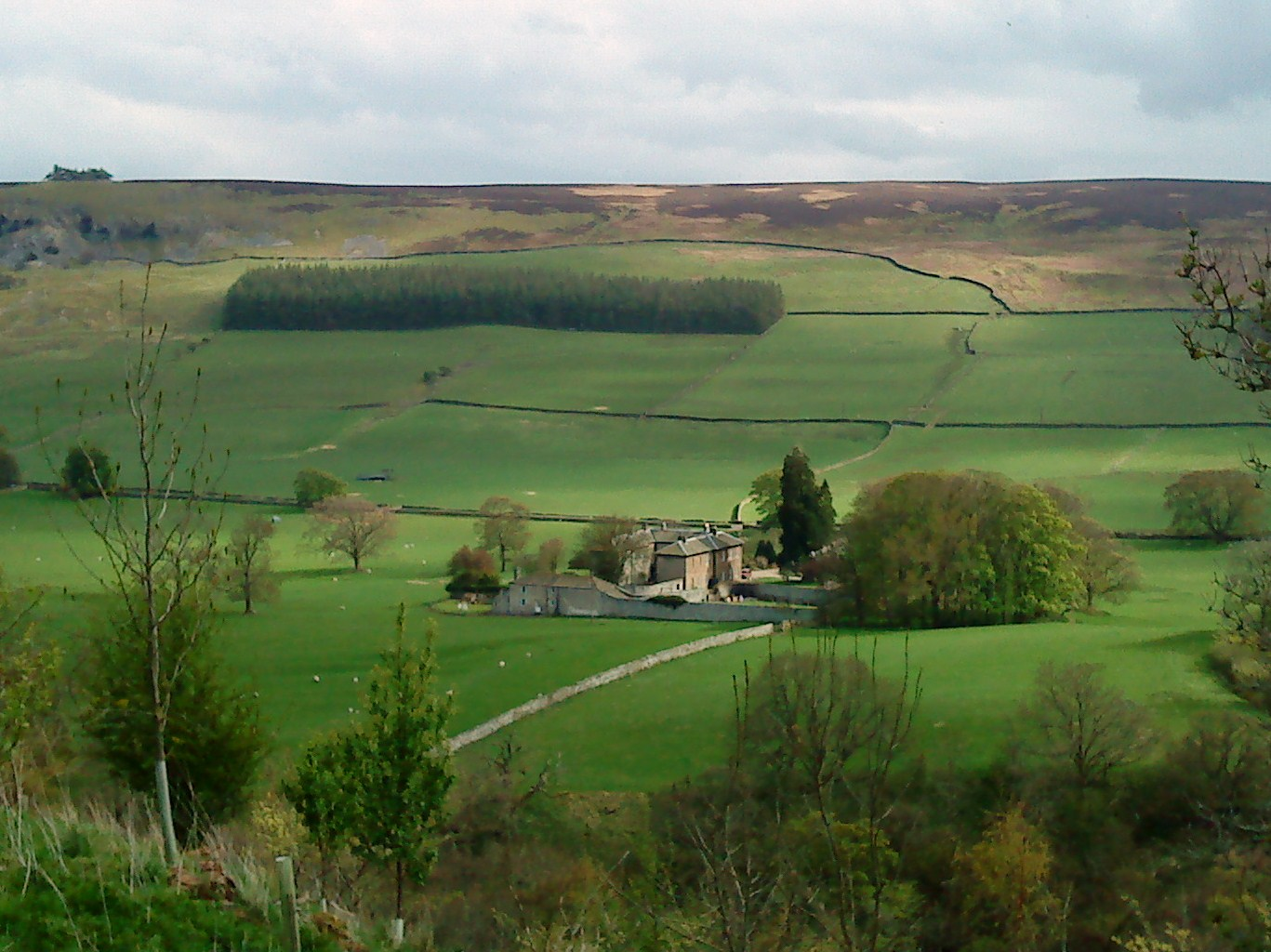
The rear of the estate from the hills to the north, near Marrick

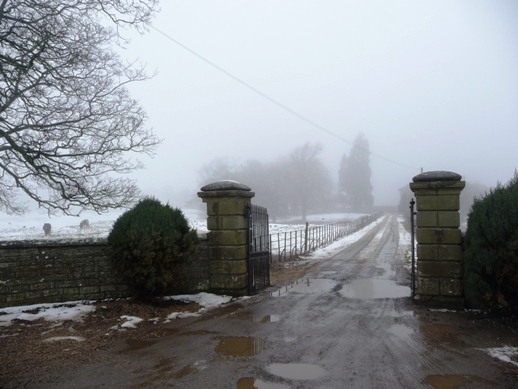
The estate's gated entrance and driveway

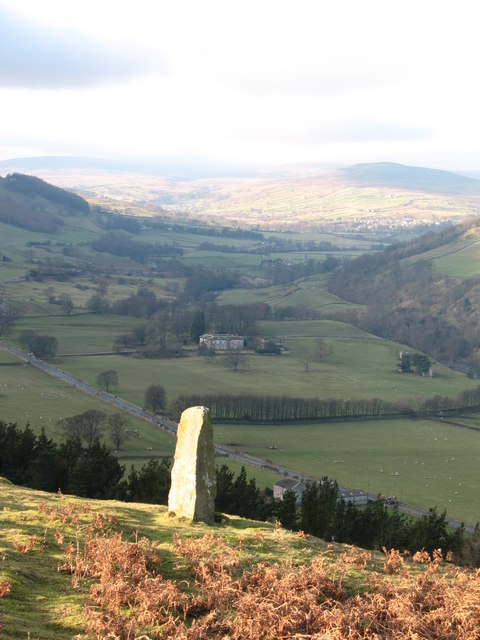
A view of the building from Ellerton Scar, near Stainton, to the east

== See also ==
- Listed buildings in Ellerton Abbey
