= William Augustus Pitt =

British Army general (c. 1728–1809)

General The Right Honourable Sir William Augustus Pitt KB
- Born: c. 1728
- Died: 29 December 1809; Highfield Park, Hampshire
- Military career
- Allegiance: Great Britain
- Branch: British Army
- Service years: 1744 to 1809
- Rank: General
- Conflicts: Seven Years' War; Battle of Kloster Kampen; French Revolutionary Wars; Napoleonic Wars
- Awards: Knight Companion of the Order of the Bath

General Sir William Augustus Pitt KB PC (c. 1728 – 29 December 1809) was a long-serving if undistinguished senior officer of the British Army whose sixty years of service covered several major wars and numerous postings as garrison or regiment commander. He served as MP between 1754 and 1761. He came from a notable political family: his father was also an MP and his elder brother George Pitt became Baron Rivers.

== Military career ==
Pitt was born in approximately 1728, the sixth but second surviving son of George Pitt, MP for Wareham and his wife Mary Louisa. His date of birth has not been ascertained, and little information is available about his early life. He may have attended Winchester College as a schoolboy as his elder brother George is known to have done, but nothing is known for sure of his activities until 1744 when he received a commission to join the 10th Dragoons as a cornet. In the Dragoons Pitt registered solid if unspectacular service and was not engaged on active service until the outbreak of the Seven Years' War in 1756.

Pitt's wartime records are vague, but he gained distinction for his bravery in action and was severely wounded and taken prisoner at the Battle of Kloster Kampen in 1760. Released on parole, Pitt returned to his regiment at the war's conclusion and was made a full colonel. Between 1754 and 1761 Pitt had been the Member of Parliament for Wareham, a Dorset constituency with approximately 500 voters. He lost his seat whilst a prisoner in France and did not enter politics again, even after his brother's elevation to the House of Lords. In 1763 Pitt married Mary Howe, the daughter of Emanuel Howe, 2nd Viscount Howe. They had no children.

In 1770 Pitt was promoted to major-general while maintaining the colonelcy of the 12th Dragoons. His forces were not deployed during the American Revolutionary War and in 1775 he transferred to be Colonel to the 3rd Regiment of Horse (Carabiniers), again not seeing any action. In 1777 he was promoted to lieutenant general and in 1784 became commander of all the British forces in Ireland, a post he retained until 1791, when he was made a Knight Companion of the Order of the Bath. At the outbreak of the French Revolutionary Wars in 1793, Pitt was promoted to full general but his age and lack of military service precluded any active postings and in 1794 he was given the shore command of the Portsmouth defences, a post he retained until 1809 when he died at his estate, Highfield House, in Hampshire aged over eighty. Despite his relatively uneventful service, Pitt continued to exert influence at Army headquarters throughout his life.

== Notes ==
Parliament of Great Britain
Preceded by Robert Banks Hodgkinson; Henry Drax	Member of Parliament for Wareham; 1754–1761; With: Henry Drax 1754–1755; Edward Drax 1755–1761	Succeeded by Thomas Erle Drax; John Pitt
Military offices
Preceded by Benjamin Carpenter	Colonel of the 12th Regiment of Dragoons; 1770–1775	Succeeded by William Keppel
Preceded by Edward Harvey	Colonel of the 3rd Regiment of Horse (Carabiniers); 1775–1780	Succeeded by Sir John Irwin
Preceded by John Mordaunt	Colonel of the 10th Regiment of Dragoons; 1780–1796	Succeeded by The Prince of Wales
Preceded by John Burgoyne	Commander-in-Chief, Ireland; 1784–1791	Succeeded by George Warde
Preceded by The Earl of Pembroke	Governor of Portsmouth; 1794–1810	Succeeded by Henry Edward Fox
Preceded by Sir George Howard	Colonel of the 1st King's Dragoon Guards; 1796–1809	Succeeded by The Lord Heathfield
