= Marrick Priory =

Former priory in Marrick, North Yorkshire, England

Coordinates: 54°22′32.44″N 1°53′55.90″W

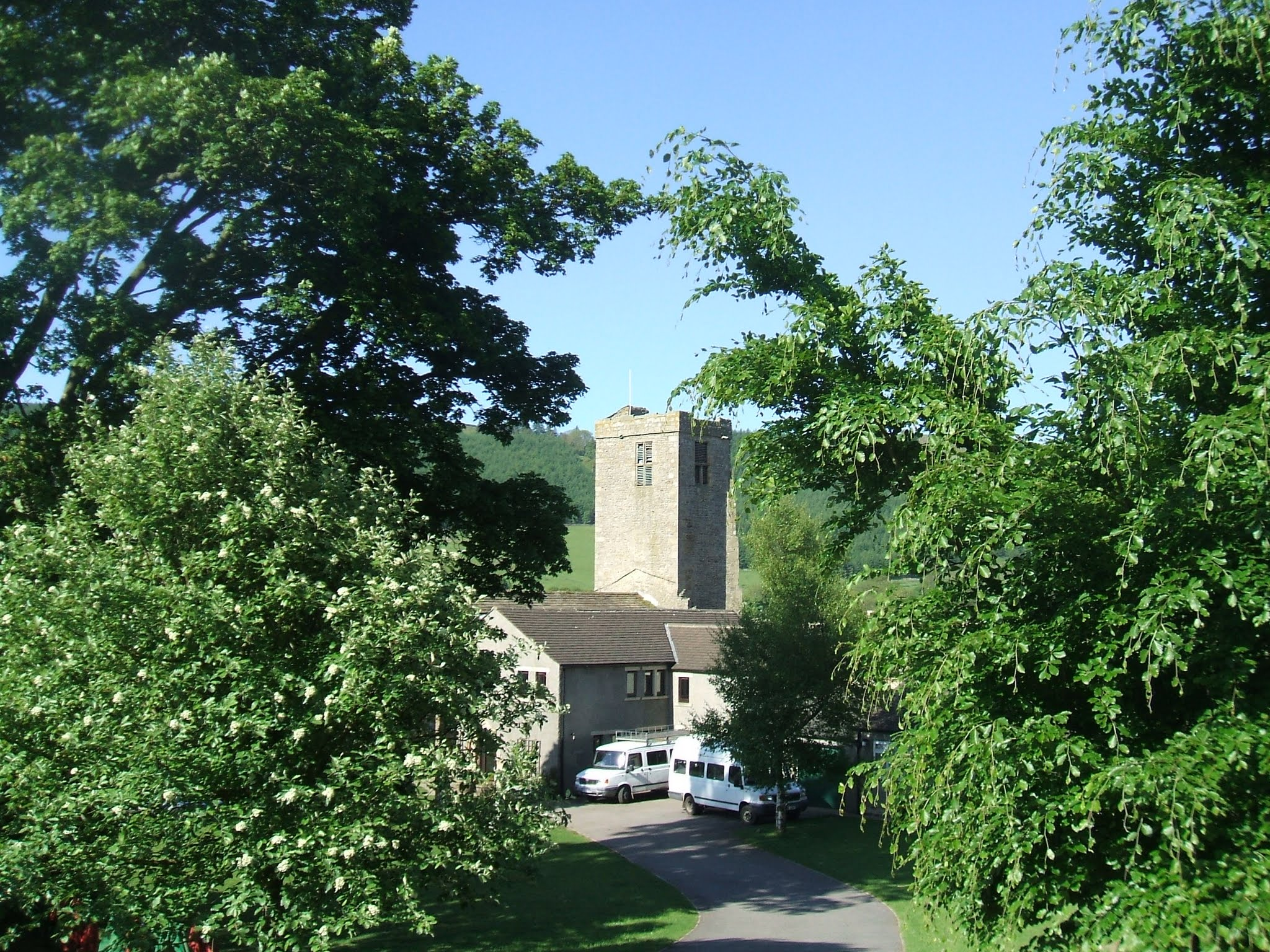
Marrick Priory

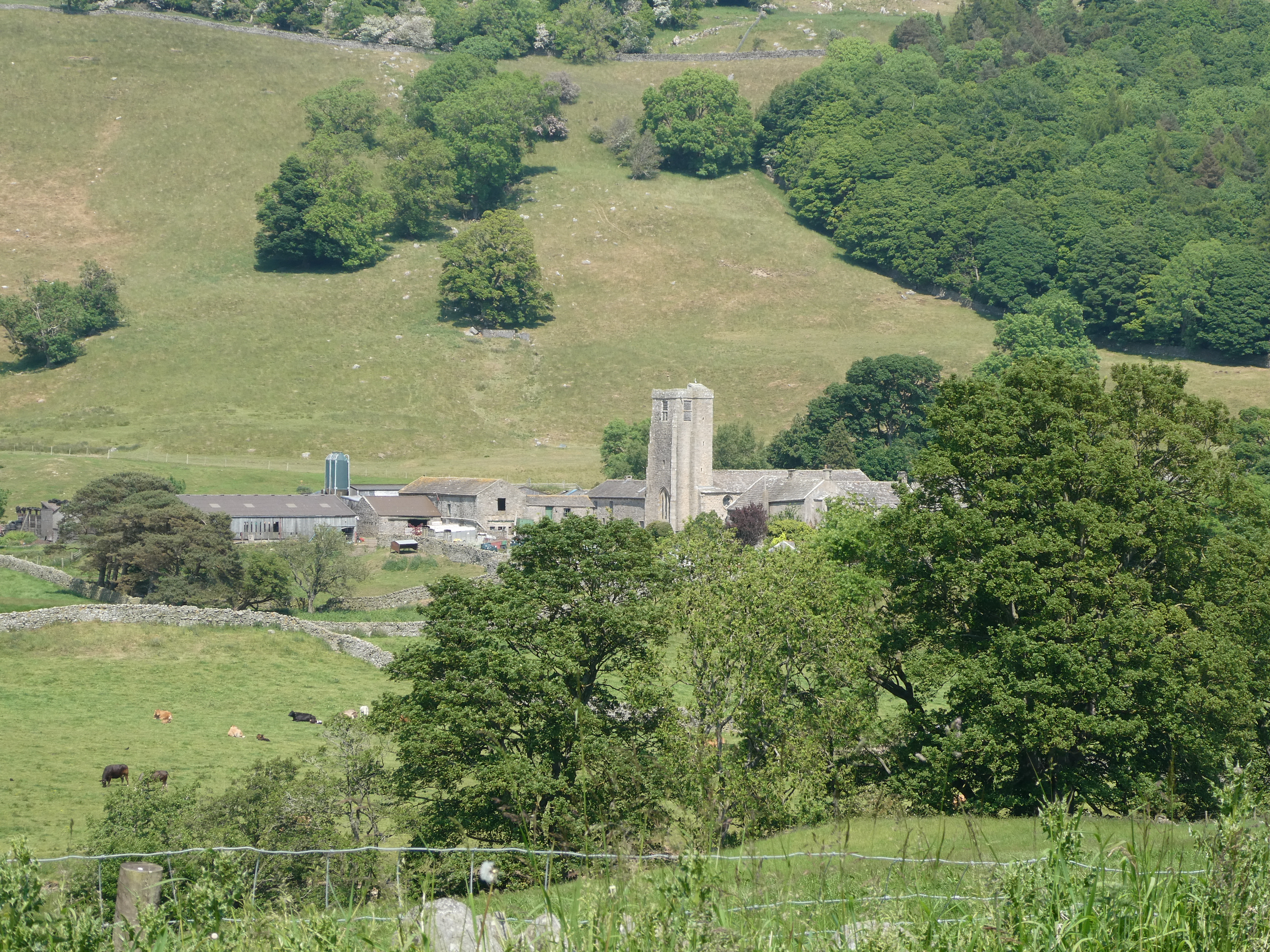
Marrick Priory, Swaledale, from the main road

Marrick Priory was a Benedictine nunnery in Richmondshire, North Yorkshire, England, established between 1140 and 1160 by Roger de Aske. The parish Church of the Virgin Mary and St. Andrew and 400 acres of local land also belonged to the priory, which thrived until the 16th century, in spite of the depredations of marauding Scots.

On 15 September 1539 during the Dissolution of the Monasteries, the prioress Christabel Cowper surrendered the priory to the commissioners John Uvedale and Leonard Bekwith. Her sixteen nuns were evicted, the prioress receiving a pension of 100 shillings and the nuns varying amounts down to 20 shillings (£1 sterling). The site was then leased by the crown to Sir John Uvedale (or Woodhall), who went on to purchase it in 1545 for £364. He sold it in 1592 to Sir Timothy Hutton of Marske, who resold it in 1633 to the Blackburns of Blackburn Hall. The church continued to be used as the place of worship for the local people until 1948, after which it was used as a farm building. It is a grade II* listed building.

In 1970 the church was converted, after some years of restoration, into an outdoor education and residential centre for young people, providing outdoor activities such as rock climbing, abseiling, open canoeing, kayaking, caving, ropes course, zip wire, orienteering and team building for several thousand people a year.

To the northeast of the priory the Nuns' Steps or Nuns' Causey (causeway) leads through Steps Wood to the village of Marrick. This flagged stone path is thought to have been associated with the priory, perhaps connecting it to the Richmond road or to its lead-mining interests. It is close to Ellerton Priory just along the valley.

== Architecture ==
The church is built in stone with a stone slate roof, and consists of a nave, a ruined chancel and a west tower. The tower has three stages, a stair tower on the south side, a three-light west window, and square-headed bell openings with mullions and transoms. On the south wall of the nave is a large round window containing a quatrefoil, and most of the other windows are in Perpendicular style.

== See also ==
- Listed buildings in Marrick
- Marrick Priory Farmhouse
