= Henry Drax =

British Whig politician (c.1693–1755)

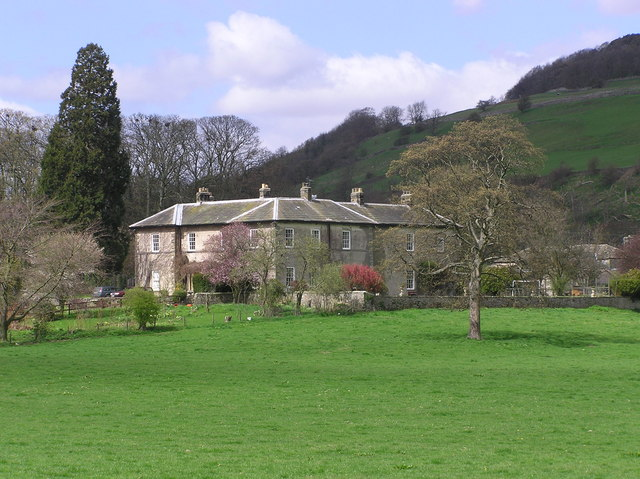
Ellerton Abbey House

Henry Drax (c. 1693–1755) of Ellerton Abbey, Yorkshire, and Charborough, near Wareham, Dorset, was a British Whig politician who sat in the House of Commons between 1718 and 1755.

Drax was the eldest son of Thomas Drax (formerly Shatterden) of Pope's Common, Hertfordshire, Ellerton Abbey and Barbados and his wife Elizabeth Ernle, daughter of Edward Ernle of Etchilhampton, Wiltshire. He is also a grandson of James Drax, a wealthy planter in Barbados, who pioneered the cultivation of sugar with the use of African slave labour.

== Slave owner ==
Thomas Shatterden inherited the estates of his mother's brother Colonel Henry Drax at Ellerton and in Barbados. By 1680, this Henry Drax was the owner of the largest plantation in Barbados, then in parish of St. John. A planter-merchant, Drax had a hired "proper persons" to act in, and do all business in Bridgetown.

Shatterden changed his surname to Drax in about 1692. This was a common practice among the heirs of wealthy planters in the British Caribbean, and was usually a clause that needed to be fulfilled in order to inherit their slave plantations in the West Indies.

== Early life ==
Drax was educated at Eton College from 1706 to 1707 and was admitted at Magdalene College, Cambridge, on 15 May 1710, aged 16. He married his first cousin, Elizabeth Ernle, daughter of Sir Edward Ernle, 3rd Baronet before 23 December 1719. She was the heiress of the Erle and Ernle families, by whom he obtained Charborough House and an electoral interest at Wareham.

== Political career ==
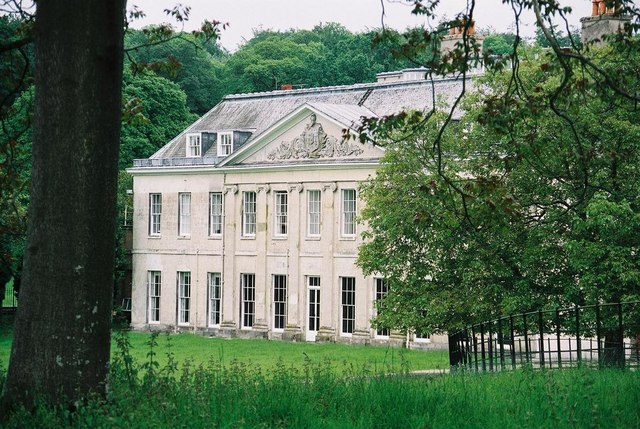
Charborough House

Drax was returned as a Whig Member of Parliament (MP) for Wareham at a by-election on 28 March 1718, after General Thomas Erle, his wife's grandfather, vacated the seat. He voted against the repeal of the Occasional Conformity and Schism Acts and the Peerage Bill in 1719. In 1720, he was one of the Members who were credited with £1,000 stock by the South Sea Company without paying for it. He did not stand for Wareham at the 1722 British general election when his father-in-law, Sir Edward Ernle, took the family seat. At the 1727 British general election he was returned as MP for Lyme Regis. After voting with the Government on the Hessians in 1730, he then voted with the Opposition. He was returned again for Wareham at the 1734 British general election and was appointed to the stewardship of the Prince of Wales's Dorset manors in 1737. He became "a great favourite" with the Prince and entertained him at Charborough in 1741.

At the 1741 British general election, he was returned at Wareham after making a compromise with John Pitt, whose family also held an interest there. In 1744, he replaced George Lyttelton as the Prince of Wales' secretary, although Horace Walpole claimed he could not write his own name. Next year, his daughter Elizabeth, who had married Augustus Berkeley, 4th Earl of Berkeley, was appointed lady of the bedchamber to the Princess of Wales. At the 1747 British general election, breaking the compromise, he was returned for Wareham with his eldest son, Thomas Erle Drax, against John Pitt, but they were both unseated on petition on 26 January 1748. When Pitt changed his seat in 1751, Henry Drax was returned in his place at a by-election on 25 January 1751. On the Prince's death in 1751, he lost his place and the prospect of a barony and went over to the Pelhams. At the 1754 British general election, there was a double return and he was not seated until 30 December 1754.

== Death and legacy ==
Drax died on 24 May 1755, leaving three sons and five daughters. As well as Thomas, his son Edward was also an MP.

Parliament of Great Britain
Preceded by George Pitt, junior Thomas Erle	Member of Parliament for Wareham; 1718–1722; With: George Pitt, junior	Succeeded by Sir Edward Ernle; Joseph Gascoigne
Preceded by Henry Holt Henley; John Burridge	Member of Parliament for Lyme Regis; 1727–1734; With: John Burridge 1727–1728; Henry Holt Henley 1728–1734	Succeeded by John Scrope; Henry Holt Henley
Preceded by Thomas Tower; Nathaniel Gould	Member of Parliament for Wareham; 1734–1748; With: John Pitt 1734–1747; Thomas Erle Drax 1747–1748	Succeeded by Robert Banks Hodgkinson; John Pitt
Preceded by Robert Banks Hodgkinson; John Pitt	Member of Parliament for Wareham; 1751–1754; With: Robert Banks Hodgkinson	Succeeded by Seat vacant after double return
Preceded by Seat vacant after double return	Member of Parliament for Wareham; 1754–1755; With: William Augustus Pitt	Succeeded by William Augustus Pitt; Edward Drax
