= Downholme Bridge =

Bridge in Downholme, North Yorkshire, England

Coordinates: 54°23′17″N 1°49′37″W

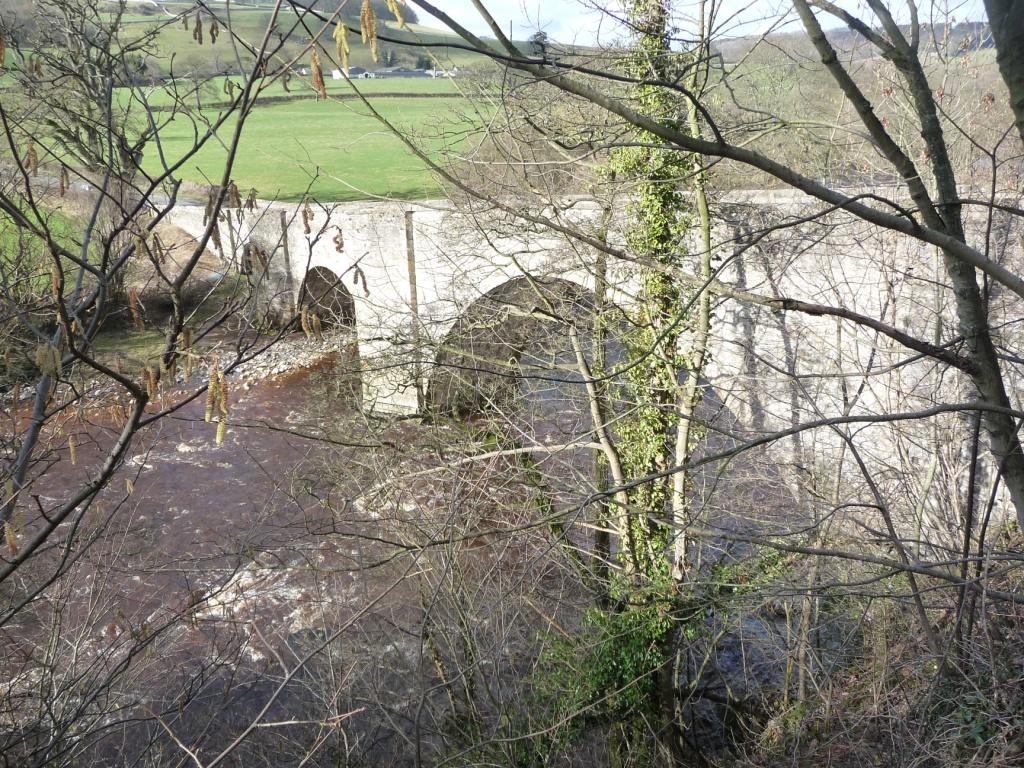
The bridge, in 2011

Downholme Bridge is a historic bridge in Downholme, a village in North Yorkshire, in England.

The bridge, designated as part of the C125 road, connects Downholme with Marske. In 1684, John Hutton from received permission to construct a bridge across the River Swale in this location. Its two eastern arches were rebuilt in 1773, to a design by John Carr, at a cost of £1,200 (equivalent to £193,000 in 2023). It was grade II* listed in 1969. The bridge was restored in 2017, with the last two weeks of work delayed to allow guests at a local wedding to cross the river.

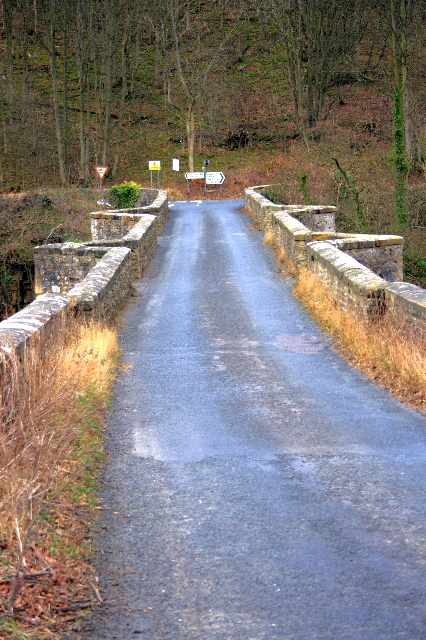
View over the bridge

The bridge is built of stone and has three arches. The western arch is slightly pointed, and the two eastern arches are round. All have triangular cutwaters, quoins, and soffits in the arches. The parapet has saddleback coping, and the terminals are square with rounded pyramidal caps.

== See also ==
- Grade II* listed buildings in North Yorkshire (district)
- Listed buildings in Downholme
- List of crossings of the River Swale
