= John Pitt (of Encombe) =

British MP

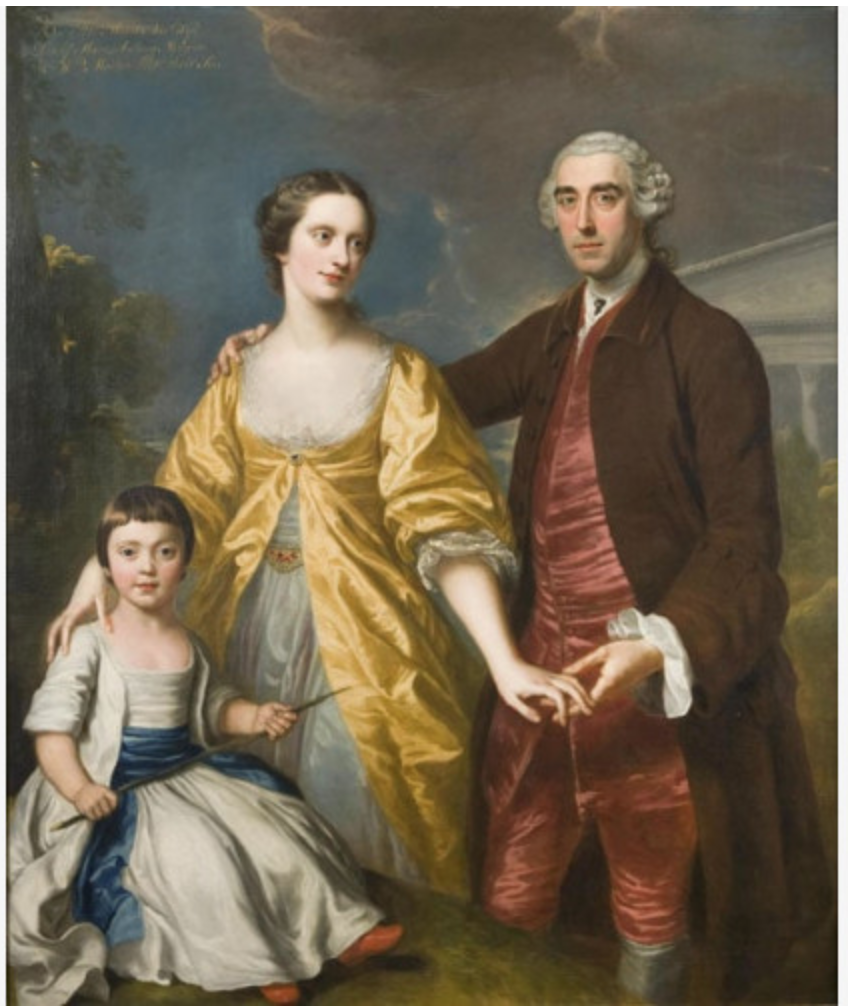
- Portrait of John Pitt by William Hoare
- Born: c. 1704
- Died: 1787
- Education: Queen's College, Oxford

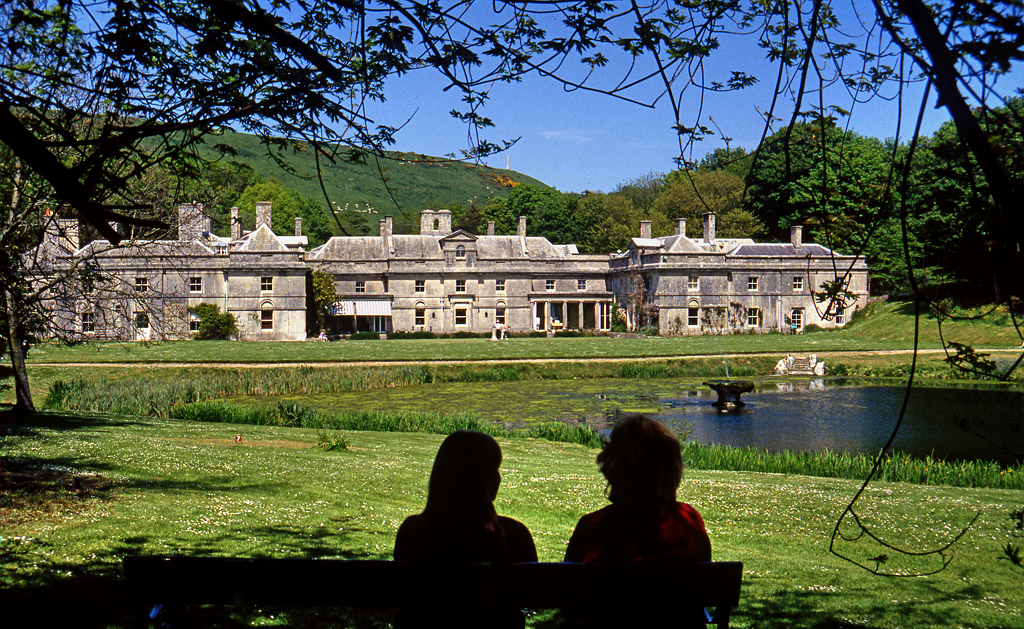
Encombe, remodelled by Pitt between 1740 and 1770

John Pitt (c.1706–1787) of Encombe House, Dorset was a British MP for 35 years. He is recorded as having given one speech to Parliament. He is noted for being the first to be appointed to office of the Steward of the Chiltern Hundreds for the purpose of resigning from parliament.

== Life ==
John was the fourth son of George Pitt (1663–1735) MP of Strathfieldsaye and second son by his second wife née Lora Grey of Kingston Maurward nr Dorchester. He was educated at Queen's College, Oxford.

The property enabling George Morton Pitt's control of the Pontefract seat came to John Pitt (of Encombe) by remainder but he sold it in 1766.

He was elected a Fellow of the Royal Society in 1775.

== Elections to Parliament ==
Pitt was an MP in two constituencies in his lifetime. In the years 1734–47 and also between January 1748 - November 1750, he was the Member for Wareham. This seat had been held by his grandfather George Pitt (1625-1694) from 1660 to 1679. Wareham was a parliamentary borough in Dorset, which elected two MPs to the House of Commons. The borough contained the town of Wareham on the Isle of Purbeck, a market town close to Poole Harbour. In 1831, the population of the borough was 1,676, and it contained 364 houses.

Between 29 January 1751 - 1761, Pitt was the Member for Dorchester. Dorchester was a parliamentary constituency centred on the town of Dorchester in Dorset. It returned two Members of Parliament to the House of Commons.

Between 1761–1768, Pitt was again the Member for Wareham.

== Acts ==
A procedure to allow resignation from the House of Commons was invented by Pitt to vacate his Wareham seat, as he wished to stand for Dorchester but could not be a candidate while still an MP. Pitt wrote to Prime Minister Henry Pelham in May 1750 reporting that he had been invited to stand in Dorchester, and asking for "a new mark of his Majesty's favour [to] enable me to do him these further services". Pelham wrote to William Pitt (the elder) indicating that he would intervene with King George II to help. On 17 January 1751 Pitt was appointed to the office of Steward of the Chiltern Hundreds, and was then elected unopposed for Dorchester.

His one reported speech was on a petition of West Country merchants who complained of French encroachments at Newfoundland.

== Political appointments ==
- A Lord of Trade 1744–55
- A Lord of the Admiralty November - December 1756
- Surveyor General of Woods and Forests: 1756–63, 1768–86

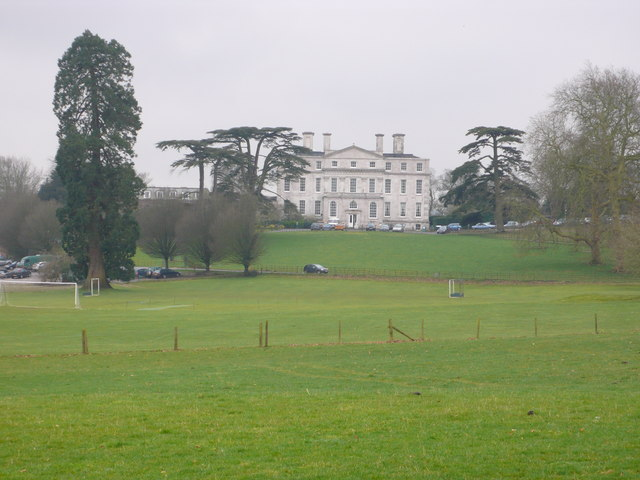
William Morton Pitt's Kingston House

== Death ==
He died in 1787. He had married, on 26 January 1753, Marcia daughter of Mark Anthony Morgan of Cottelstown County Sligo and they had one daughter and four sons including William Morton Pitt of Kingston House, Dorset. His daughter, Marcia Pitt, married George James Cholmondeley (b. 22 Feb 1752, d. 5 Nov 1830), the son of Mary Woffington.

Parliament of Great Britain
Preceded by Nathaniel Gould; Thomas Tower	Member of Parliament for Wareham; 1734–1747; With: Henry Drax	Succeeded by Thomas Erle Drax; Henry Drax
Preceded by Thomas Erle Drax; Henry Drax	Member of Parliament for Wareham; 26 January 1748 – November 1750; With: Robert Banks Hodgkinson	Succeeded by Whitshed Keene; Robert Palk
Preceded by John Browne; Nathaniel Gundry	Member of Parliament for Dorchester; 29 January 1751 – 1761; With: John Damer 29 January 1751 –1752; George Clavell 1752 – 1754; The Lord Milton 1754 – 1761	Succeeded by Thomas Foster; John Damer
Preceded by Edward Drax; William Augustus Pitt	Member of Parliament for Wareham; 1761 – September 1768; With: Thomas Erle Drax	Succeeded by Robert Palk; Ralph Burton
