= Marrick Priory Farmhouse =

Building in Marrick, North Yorkshire, England

Coordinates: 54°22′31″N 1°53′55″W

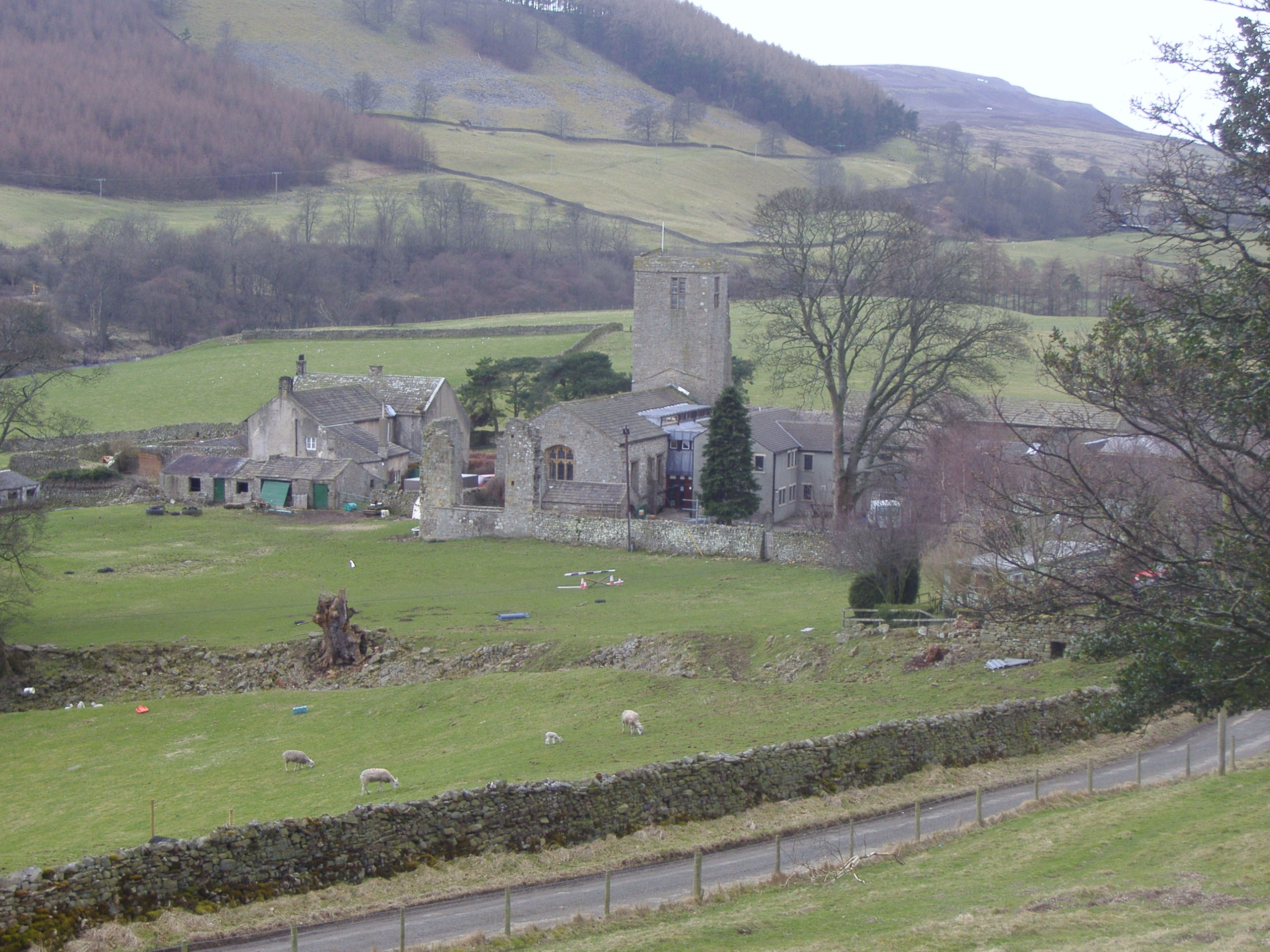
The building (left), in 2010

Marrick Priory Farmhouse is a historic building in Marrick, a village in North Yorkshire, in England.

The building was constructed in or before the 16th century, as the hall and parlour of Marrick Priory. It later served as a farmhouse, before being divided into two houses. It has been altered over the years, but retains substantial early material. It was grade II* listed in 1966. In the garden are remains of the priory's cloister.

The farmhouse is built of stone and has a stone slate roof with copings and kneelers. There are two storeys and an L-shaped plan, with a main range of three bays, the middle bay projecting, a cross-wing on the left, and a rear outshut. On the front is a segmental-arched doorway with a moulded surround. In the middle bay is a casement window, and the other windows are sashes. In the cross-wing is a round-headed window with a chamfered surround.

== See also ==
- Grade II* listed buildings in North Yorkshire (district)
- Listed buildings in Marrick
