= Christabel Cowper =

English Benedictine nun, prioress of Marrick

- Born: 1495
- Died: 1562 (aged 66–67)

Christabel Cowper (c.1495 – 1562) was an English Benedictine nun who was the last prioress of Marrick Priory before the Dissolution of the Monasteries.

== Life ==
Comper is said to have been born in 1495. Her brother Edward was born in Kirkbymoorside in North Yorkshire and he would become the Bishop of Rievaulx until 1533 when he was found guilty of misconduct. Her other siblings were John, Isabel and Elizabeth.

She is first mention in 1529 when she was already the prioress. Her predecessor was Christina Metcalf. In 1536 the priory came to the notice of Cromwell's commissioners as part of the Dissolution of the Monasteries. They were empowered to close small monasteries or convents if they had an income of over £200 a year and particularly if they were full of 'manifest sin, vicious, carnal, and abominable living' as alleged by the act empowering their closure. Cowper's nuns appear to have judged to be well behaved but the income of the house was well less than £200. The commissioners closed over 300 monasteries but 80 were spared despite their small size - but this was only in the first wave of closures. The commissioners noted that Marrick was spending a larger proportion of its income on supplying alms than similar groups of nuns.

Cowper had seen that closure was inevitable and had even tried to arrange to rent the property before the commissioners arrived. As it was the commissioners eventually gave the house three years of grace, but Cowper was not idle. During those three years she rented out parcels of the priory's lands.

On 15 September 1539, Cowper surrendered the priory to the commissioners viz John Uvedale and Leonard Bekwith. Her sixteen nuns were evicted as part of the Dissolution of the Monasteries, the prioress receiving a pension of 100 shillings and the nuns varying amounts down to 20 shillings (£1 sterling).

== Death and legacy ==
The priory was then leased by the crown to Sir John Uvedale (or Woodhall), who went on to purchase it in 1545 for £364. Cowper died in 1495.

Sir John Uvedale sold the priory in 1592 to Sir Timothy Hutton of Marske, who resold it in 1633 to the Blackburns of Blackburn Hall. The church continued to be used as the place of worship for the local people until 1948, after which it was used as a farm building. It is a grade II* listed building.
