= Listed buildings in Downholme =

Downholme is a civil parish in the county of North Yorkshire, England. It contains nine listed buildings that are recorded in the National Heritage List for England. Of these, two are listed at Grade II*, the middle of the three grades, and the others are at Grade II, the lowest grade. The parish contains the village of Downholme and the surrounding countryside. The listed buildings consist of a church, a coffin and a cross in the churchyard, the ruins of a manor house, a bridge, a farmhouse, a former vicarage, and two mileposts.

== Key ==
Grade	Criteria
II*	Particularly important buildings of more than special interest
II	Buildings of national importance and special interest

== Buildings ==
Name and location	Photograph	Date	Notes	Grade
St Michael and All Angels' Church; 54.38039°N 1.83110°W		12th century	The church, which has been altered and extended through the centuries, is built in stone and has an artificial slate roof. It consists of a nave with a north aisle, a south porch, a chancel with a north aisle, and a corniced bellcote on the west gable. The porch is gabled, and contains a round-arched doorway with voussoirs, imposts and a keystone. The inner doorway is Norman with one order of shafts and a chevroned arch.	II*
Coffin in churchyard 54.38037°N 1.83100°W		13th to 14th century	The coffin to the south of the chancel door of St Michael and All Angels' Church is in sandstone, and is hollowed out in the shape of a body. The cover is tapered and has chamfered sides. On it is a faint outline of a foliate cross.	II
Cross in churchyard 54.38027°N 1.83110°W		Medieval	The cross to the south of St Michael and All Angels' Church is in sandstone. The older parts consist of two square steps and the cross base. On this is a shaft with a Celtic head dating from the 19th century.	II
Downholme Hall ruins 54.37672°N 1.82834°W		15th century	A fortified manor house, now a ruin. The remains are in stone, and include three barrel vaulted basements, and a small trefoil-headed window in the west wall.	II
Home Farmhouse; 54.37638°N 1.82679°W	—	17th century	The farmhouse is in stone with quoins and an artificial slate roof with coped gables and carved kneelers. There are two storeys, four bays, and a single-storey rear wing. In the centre is a gabled porch containing a doorway with a chamfered surround and a triangular soffit to the lintel. The windows are a mix, and include sashes, casements, a two-light chamfered mullioned window, and a blocked fire window. In the left gable end is a blocked opening with a decorative surround, including diaper moulding, coats of arms and corbels with male and female heads.	II
Downholme Bridge; 54.38796°N 1.82685°W		1674	The two eastern arches of the bridge were rebuilt in 1773 by John Carr. The bridge carries a road over the River Swale, and is in stone with three arches, the western arch is slightly pointed, and the two eastern arches are round. All have triangular cutwaters, quoins, and soffits in the arches. The parapet has saddleback coping, and the terminals are square with rounded pyramidal caps.	II*
Old Vicarage; 54.37613°N 1.83010°W	—	c. 1820	The vicarage, later a private house, is in stone, with quoins, moulded gutter brackets, and a hipped stone slate roof. There are two storeys and an L-shaped plan, with a front range of three bays and a rear wing on the right. The doorway is in the centre, there is a canted bay window, and the other windows are sashes.	II
Milepost near Low Ingsque Wood; 54.37842°N 1.84735°W		Late 19th century	The milepost is on the north side of the B6270 road. It is in cast iron, about 500 millimetres (20 in) high, and has a triangular plan and a sloping top. On the top is inscribed "NRYCC", on the left side is the distance to Richmond, and on the right side is the distance to Reeth.	II
Milepost north of the junction with the B6270 road 54.38602°N 1.82869°W		Late 19th century	The milepost is on the northwest side of the A6108 road. It is in cast iron, about 700 millimetres (28 in) high, and has a triangular plan and a sloping top. On the top is inscribed "LEYBURN H.D." and on the sides are pointing hands. On the left side is the distance to Richmond, and on the right side is the distance to Reeth.	II
