= Henry Holt Henley =

British Member of Parliament (died 1748)

Member of Parliament for Lyme Regis
- In office 1722–1727
- In office 1728–1748

Personal details
- Died: 8 May 1748
- Party: Whig
- Spouse(s): Sarah Cornish; Catherine Hare
- Children: 4
- Parent(s): Henry Henley; Catherine Holt
- Occupation: Lawyer
- Profession: Barrister

Henry Holt Henley (died 8 May 1748) was a British lawyer and Whig politician who sat in the House of Commons between 1722 and 1748. He represented Lyme Regis in Parliament and also served several terms as Mayor of Lyme Regis.

Henley was the only son of Henry Henley, MP of Leigh and Colway and his wife Catherine Holt, daughter of Richard Holt, MP of Nursted, Hampshire. He was admitted at Middle Temple in 1716, and was called to the bar in 1722. He married Sarah Cornish daughter of Henry Cornish, MP of St. Lawrence Jewry, London.

Henley was elected as a Whig Member of Parliament for Lyme Regis at the 1722 general election. He was Mayor of Lyme Regis for 1724 to 1725. He was defeated at the 1727 general election but was seated on petition on 28 February 1728 after John Burridge, as mayor, had illegally returned himself. In 1728 he was appointed to a lucrative sinecure post as Clerk of the Pipe, which had been held by his brother-in-law, Anthony Cornish. He was Mayor of Lyme Regis again for 1731 to 1732. At the 1734 general election, he was re-elected MP for Lyme Regis. He was Mayor of Lyme Regis for a third term for the year 1738 to 1739. At the 1741 general election, he was returned to Parliament unopposed. He was Mayor of Lyme Regis for the year 1746 to 1747. He was re-elected MP at the 1747 general election. During his time in Parliament, he voted for the Administration in all recorded divisions. He was sometime Recorder of Lyme Regis.

Henley's first wife died on 25 April 1731 and he succeeded his father in 1733. He married as his second wife, Catherine Hare, daughter of Rev. Hugh Charles Hare of Docking, Norfolk on 8 May 1739. He died on 8 May 1748. He had a son and three daughters by his first wife.

Parliament of Great Britain
Preceded by John Henley; John Burridge	Member of Parliament for Lyme Regis; 1722–1727; With: John Burridge	Succeeded by Henry Drax; John Burridge
Preceded by Henry Drax; John Burridge	Member of Parliament for Lyme Regis; 1728–1742; With: Henry Drax; John Scrope 1734	Succeeded by John Scrope; Robert Henley
