= Stainton, west North Yorkshire =

Hamlet and civil parish in North Yorkshire, England

Coordinates: 54.364213°N 1.837617°W

Stainton
- Hamlet and civil parish
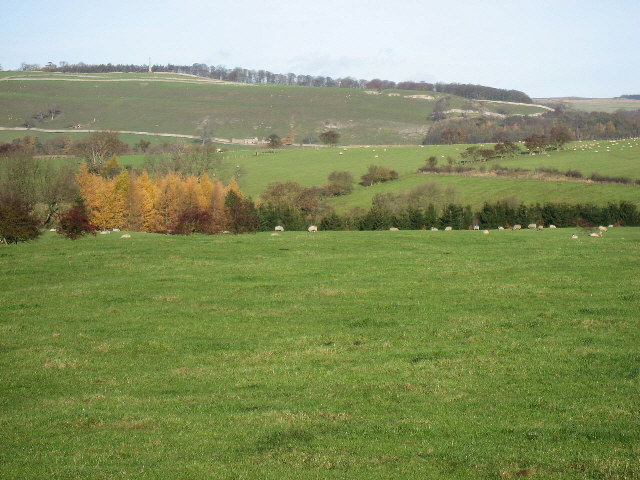
- How Hill from near Stainton

- Location within North Yorkshire
- OS grid reference: SE105965
- Civil parish: Stainton
- Unitary authority: North Yorkshire
- Ceremonial county: North Yorkshire
- Region: Yorkshire and the Humber
- Country: England
- Sovereign state: United Kingdom
- Post town: Richmond
- Postcode district: DL11
- Police: North Yorkshire
- Fire: North Yorkshire
- Ambulance: Yorkshire

Stainton is a hamlet and civil parish in the county of North Yorkshire, England. It is located just outside the Yorkshire Dales National Park, in Swaledale. The population of the parish was estimated at 10 in 2016.

It lies close to the army training camp of Wathgill in the adjoining civil parish of Walburn. A large part of the parish consists of Ministry of Defence ranges and training areas.

It was historically a township in the parish of Downholme which was part of the Hang West wapentake, North Riding of Yorkshire. Walburn became a separate civil parish in 1866. In 1974 it was transferred to the new county of North Yorkshire. From 1974 to 2023 it was part of the district of Richmondshire, it is now administered by the unitary North Yorkshire Council.

The name Stainton derives from the Old English stāntūn meaning 'stone settlement'.
