= Listed buildings in Marrick =

Marrick is a civil parish in the county of North Yorkshire, England. It contains 18 listed buildings that are recorded in the National Heritage List for England. Of these, one is listed at Grade II*, the middle of the three grades, and the others are at Grade II, the lowest grade. The parish contains the villages of Marrick, Hurst and Washfold, and the surrounding countryside. In the countryside are remains from previous industry, and the listed buildings associated with this are two mills, two chimneys and a limekiln. The other listed buildings include houses, farmhouses and farm buildings, a former church, and a chapel.

== Key ==
Grade	Criteria
II*	Particularly important buildings of more than special interest
II	Buildings of national importance and special interest

== Buildings ==
Name and location	Photograph	Date	Notes	Grade
St Andrew's Church; 54.37550°N 1.89837°W		13th century	The church of Marrick Priory, it was largely rebuilt in 1811, and in about 1970 converted for other uses. It is built in stone with a stone slate roof, and consists of a nave, a ruined chancel and a west tower. The tower has three stages, a stair tower on the south side, a three-light west window, and square-headed bell openings with mullions and transoms. On the south wall of the nave is a large round window containing a quatrefoil, and most of the other windows are in Perpendicular style.	II
Marrick Priory Farmhouse; 54.37528°N 1.89858°W		16th century (or earlier)	The farmhouse, later two dwellings, is in stone and has a stone slate roof with copings and kneelers. There are two storeys and an L-shaped plan, with a main range of three bays, the middle bay projecting, a cross-wing on the left, and a rear outshut. On the front is a segmental-arched doorway with a moulded surround. In the middle bay is a casement window, and the other windows are sashes. In the cross-wing is a round-headed window with a chamfered surround.	II*
Old Manor House; 54.38300°N 1.84615°W	—	17th century	A farmhouse in stone with a stone slate roof. There are two storeys and two bays. To the right is a doorway with a chamfered surround and a triangular soffit to the lintel, and to the left is an inserted doorway. On the ground floor are two blocked single-light windows, and the upper floor contains two-light mullioned windows.	II
Former White Horse Inn; 54.37977°N 1.88347°W	—	17th century	The inn, later a private house, is in stone with a stone slate roof. There are two storeys and three bays, and a two-storey two-bay extension on the left. In the centre of the main block is a doorway with quoined chamfered jambs, and a chamfered triangular-headed soffit, above which is a chamfered hood mould and a small sundial. On the left in both floors is a fire window in an architrave, and the other windows are sashes, those on the ground floor with hood moulds.	II
Washfold Cottage; 54.41951°N 1.91474°W	—	Early 18th century	The house is in stone with quoins and a stone slate roof. There are two storeys, two bays, an added bay to the left, and a rear outshut. On the front is a doorway, and the windows are sashes.	II
Hurst Hall and outbuilding 54.41639°N 1.93182°W	—	18th century	A house, later converted into an outbuilding, and a farmhouse added in the early 19th century. Both are in stone with stone slate roofs and two storeys. The farmhouse has three bays, a central doorway with a fanlight, and a stone coped roof. The outbuilding has two bays, and it contains small square window openings.	II
Green Dragon Farmhouse and outbuilding 54.42012°N 1.91889°W		1757	A public house, later a farmhouse with an outbuilding under the same roof, in stone, with sandstone dressings, quoins, and a Welsh slate roof with shaped kneelers. There are two storeys and three bays. In the centre is a small porch, and a doorway with a plain surround and an inscribed and dated lintel. The windows on the ground floor are casements, and on the upper floor they are sashes, all with plain surrounds.	II
Upper Mill; 54.39064°N 1.88026°W		1782 or later	The lead smelting mill, now a ruin, is in stone. It has a rectangular plan, a single storey, projecting through-stones, a flat-headed doorway, and a chimney 36 feet (11 m) tall.	II
Dovecote, Marrick Park; 54.37864°N 1.86064°W	—	Early 19th century	The dovecote is in stone with a hipped stone slate roof. There are two storeys and a square plan, the dovecote contains a doorway and a four-light window, and under the eaves are bird holes. On the top are the remains of a cupola.	II
Limekiln; 54.39550°N 1.90910°W	—	Early 19th century	The limekiln is in stone and built against a hillside. It has a square plan, it contains a segmental arch with voussoirs, and on the top is a circular hole.	II
Lower Mill; 54.39062°N 1.87926°W		Early 19th century (or earlier)	The lead smelting mill, now a ruin, is in stone. The main building has a rectangular plan, quoins and projecting through-stones. It contains a doorway and two windows, all with segmental heads.	II
Methodist Chapel; 54.42012°N 1.92218°W	—	Early 19th century	The chapel is in stone, with quoins, and a stone slate roof with stone copings. There are two storeys and two bays. The central doorway has a sandstone surround, a semicircular head, and a keystone, and the windows are sashes.	II
Prys House; 54.41597°N 1.90060°W	—	Early 19th century	The farmhouse is in stone, with quoins, and a stone slate roof with stone copings. There are three bays, sash windows and a central doorway.	II
Marrick Park Farmhouse and outbuildings 54.37854°N 1.86043°W	—	Early or mid-19th century	The farmhouse incorporates the 17th-century core of a manor house. It is in stone, and has a stone slate roof with stone copings and shaped kneelers. There are two storeys, and an H-shaped plan, with a central range of four bays, and gabled two-bay wings. The windows are sashes.	II
Hall Farmhouse, cottage and outbuildings 54.41651°N 1.93069°W	—	19th century	The farmhouse, cottage, stable and cart-shed with hayloft above are under one roof. They are in stone and have a coped stone slate roof, and two storeys. The house has three bays, a central porch, a dated lintel and sash windows. To the right is a cottage with two bays and a doorway, and to the left is a cart shed with a segmental arch of voussoirs, a stable containing a doorway with a dated lintel, and external steps to the hayloft door.	II
Stable block, Marrick Park; 54.37875°N 1.86047°W	—	Mid-19th century	The stable block is in stone, with a stone slate roof and two storeys. In the centre is a coach house with a segmental arch of voussoirs, and it is flanked by stables with doorways and windows. Above the coach house is a segmental arch of voussoirs, flanked by square openings.	II
Chimney at NZ0484002278; 54.41658°N 1.92669°W		Late 19th century	The chimney serving a lead mine is in stone, and has a circular plan.	II
Chimney at NZ0454902218; 54.41596°N 1.93171°W		Late 19th century	The chimney serving a lead mine is in stone, and has a square plan.	II
