= Listed buildings in Walburn, North Yorkshire =

Walburn is a civil parish in the county of North Yorkshire, England. It contains three listed buildings that are recorded in the National Heritage List for England. Of these, one is listed at Grade I, the highest of the three grades, and the others are at Grade II, the lowest grade. The parish contains the hamlet of Walburn and the surrounding area. The most important building in the parish is Walburn Hall, which is listed, as well as its courtyard wall, and a nearby bridge.

== Key ==
Grade	Criteria
I	Buildings of exceptional interest, sometimes considered to be internationally important
II	Buildings of national importance and special interest

== Buildings ==
Name and location	Photograph	Date	Notes	Grade
Walburn Hall; 54.35904°N 1.81842°W		15th century	A fortified manor house that has been altered. It is in stone with quoins and a stone slate roof. There are two storeys and an irregular L-shaped plan with two small wings at the rear. The main range on the east side has a gabled tower porch containing a doorway, and a chamfered mullioned window, above which is a window with a four-centred arch, all with hood moulds. The gable has square kneelers, ridged coping, and a square pedestal finial. Most of the windows are mullioned or mullioned and transomed.	I
Courtyard walls, Walburn Hall; 54.35889°N 1.81867°W		15th century	The walls are in stone, and about 4 metres (13 ft) in height. The front wall, which is about 12 metres (39 ft) in length, has feather-edged coping, and contains a doorway with a chamfered surround, a segmental arch and a hood mould. Inside it, there is a paved parapet walk, with steps in the northwest corner. The wall continues to the left, and contains a gateway.	II
Walburn Bridge; 54.35907°N 1.81776°W		18th century	The bridge carries the A6108 road over Gill Beck. It is in stone, and consists of a single round arch. The upstream side has chamfered voussoirs with spandrels, and a parapet with segmental coping. The downstream side, which is later, has pilasters with banded rustication flanking the arch, voussoirs, a hood mould, a band, and a parapet with segmental coping.	II
