= Ellerton Abbey =

Civil parish in North Yorkshire, England

Coordinates: 54.36°N 1.89°W

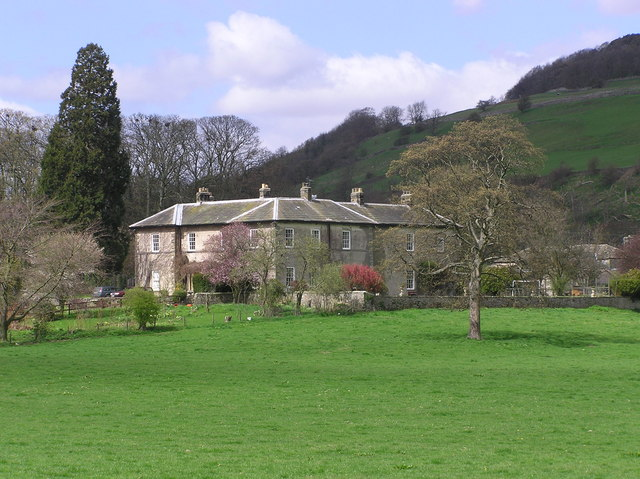

- Location within North Yorkshire
- Population: 20
- OS grid reference: SE0796
- Civil parish: Ellerton Abbey
- Unitary authority: North Yorkshire
- Ceremonial county: North Yorkshire
- Region: Yorkshire and the Humber
- Country: England
- Sovereign state: United Kingdom
- Post town: Richmond
- Postcode district: DL11
- Police: North Yorkshire
- Fire: North Yorkshire
- Ambulance: Yorkshire

Ellerton Abbey is a civil parish in the county of North Yorkshire, England. It is located on the River Swale in lower Swaledale, 6 miles (10 km) south-west of Richmond. The population of the parish was estimated at 20 in 2016. The parish consists of farmland, a few scattered houses and an area of moorland which is part of the army training area associated with Wathgill Camp. The parish includes the site of the deserted medieval village of Ellerton, not to be confused with the modern village of Ellerton-on-Swale 11 miles to the east, but there is no modern village in the civil parish.

From 1974 to 2023 it was part of the district of Richmondshire, it is now administered by the unitary North Yorkshire Council.

The parish includes Ellerton Abbey House and the adjacent ruins of Ellerton Priory.

== Etymology ==
The place-name Ellerton derives from the Old English words elri "alder" and tun "farm or enclosure". The place was mentioned in the Domesday Book, as Elreton, when it was held by Count Alan of Brittany.

== History ==
Ellerton appears to have been a village in the Middle Ages. It was historically a township in the parish of Downholme in the wapentake of Hang West in the North Riding of Yorkshire. At least some of the land was held by Ellerton Priory, although the priory was never well endowed. After the dissolution, the manor passed to the Brackenbury family, who sold it in 1654 to James Drax, whose descendants hold it today. In 1801 the census recorded 116 inhabitants in the township. In 1830 the Drax family built Ellerton Abbey house, now a Grade II listed building.

Ellerton Abbey became a separate civil parish in 1866. In 1974 it was transferred to the new county of North Yorkshire.

== See also ==
- Listed buildings in Ellerton Abbey
