= St Michael and All Angels' Church, Downholme =

Anglican church in North Yorkshire, England

Coordinates: 54.3803°N 1.8310°W

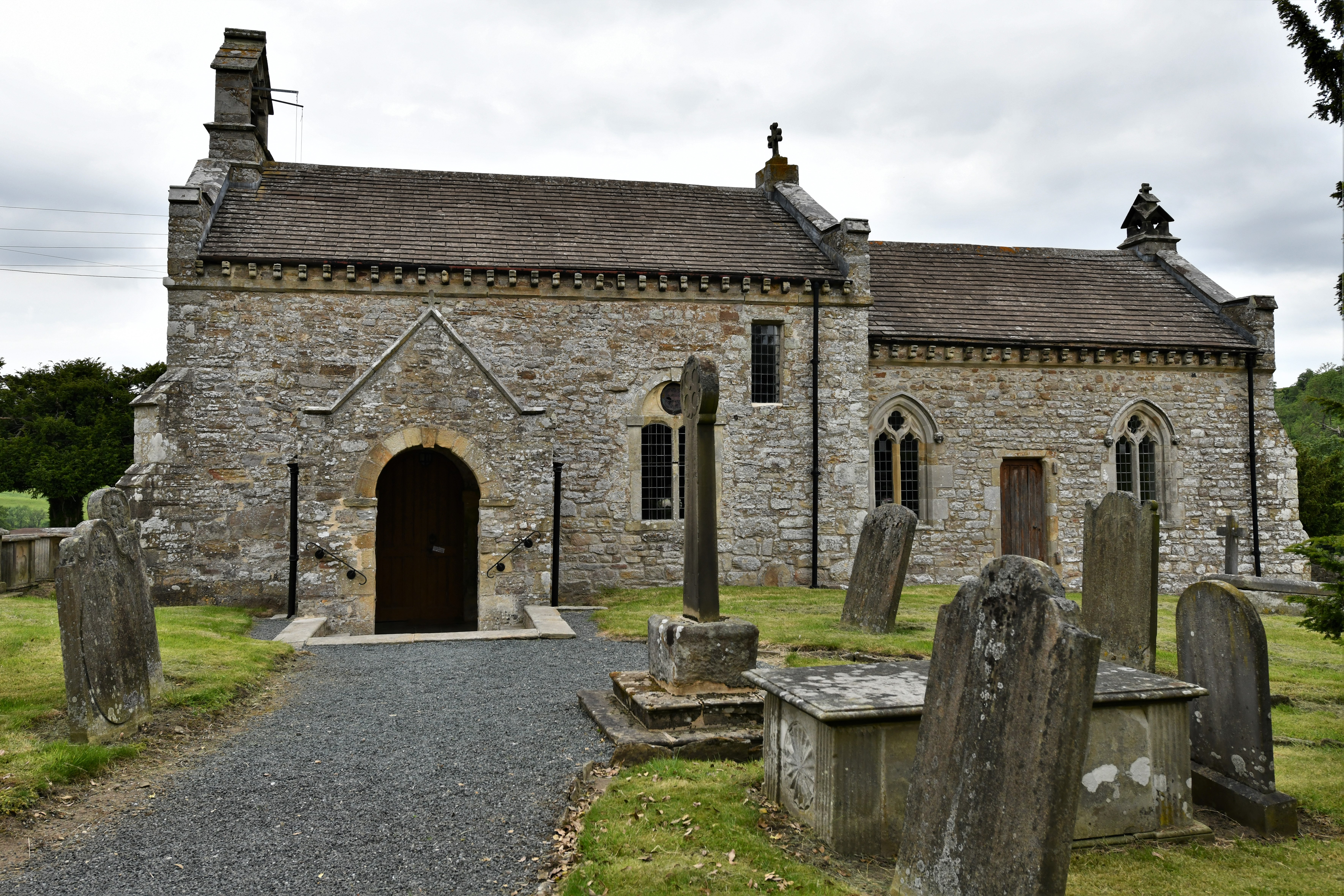
The church, in 2019

St Michael and All Angels' Church is an Anglican church in Downholme, a village in North Yorkshire, in England.

The church was built about 1180, initially consisting of a nave and chancel. A north aisle was added around 1200, and the chancel was rebuilt about 1330. About 1430, the aisle was extended to create a north chapel. The church was restored in 1811, when a porch was added, and again in 1886 and 1894. It was grade II* listed in 1969.

The church is built of stone and has an artificial slate roof. It consists of a nave with a north aisle, a south porch, a chancel with a north aisle, and a corniced bellcote on the west gable. The porch is gabled, and contains a round-arched doorway with voussoirs, imposts and a keystone. The inner doorway is Norman with one order of shafts and a chevroned arch. Inside, there is a 12th-century octagonal font and a piscina.

== See also ==
- Grade II* listed churches in North Yorkshire (district)
- Listed buildings in Downholme
