= Ellerton Priory (Swaledale) =

Ruin of a cistercian nunnery

Coordinates: 54°22′18.8″N 1°52′45.1″W

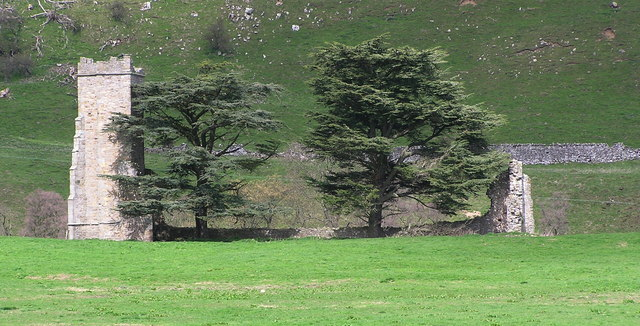
The Priory ruins

Ellerton Priory was a priory of Cistercian nuns in Swaledale in North Yorkshire, England. Its ruins lie in the civil parish of Ellerton Abbey.

== History ==
There is uncertainty over the establishment of the priory. It was probably founded in the late 12th century, either by the Egglescliffe family, or by Warnerus, chief steward to the Earl of Richmond, or by Wymerus of the Aske family. In 1342 it suffered badly at the hands of marauding Scots, who are described as having razed and despoiled the Priory.

In 1536 Thomas Cromwell's commissioners arrived to inspect the convent as part of the Dissolution of the Monasteries. The prioress Joan Harkey had to admit that one of her nuns, Cecily Swale, was asking to leave the convent. She wanted to leave after being released from her vows, but she had already given birth to a child. Not every monastery was to be closed in this phase, but the priory was formally surrendered to the Crown in August that year and dissolved in the following year. The site is a scheduled Ancient Monument and parts of the priory are grade II listed.

The Priory ruins stand close to the Richmond to Reeth road, just a mile downstream from the former Benedictine Priory of Marrick. The ruins include the remains of the priory church built in the 15th century. The church tower appears to have been rebuilt as a romantic ruin in the 19th century. There is no public access to the ruins.

== Ellerton Abbey House ==
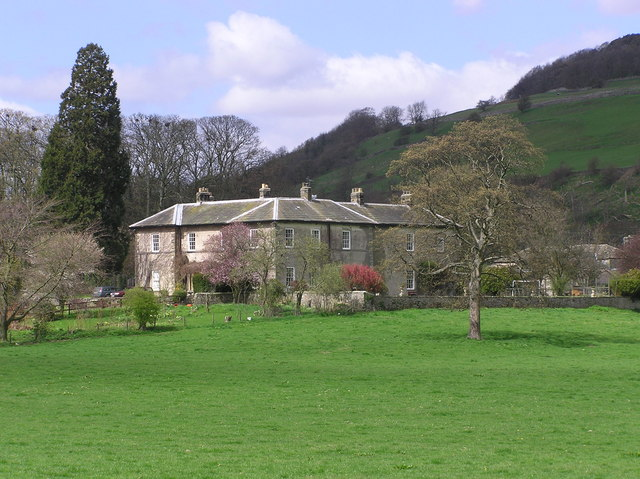
Ellerton Abbey House

== See also ==
- Listed buildings in Ellerton Abbey
