= Joan Harkey =

- Died: 1550
- Occupation: nun
- Known for: last prioress of Ellerton Priory
- Successor: in Yorkshireshire

Joan Harkey ( – 1550) was the last English prioress of Ellerton Priory in Swaledale in Yorkshire.

== Life ==
There is some confusion over who founded the priory but it was established, probably, in the twelfth century. The candidates are the Egglescliffe family, Warnerus, chief steward to the Earl of Richmond, or by Wymerus of the Aske family. Another candidate was William Aslaby and one of his descendants may have included Agnes Aslaby who was one of the last nuns in the priory. Agnes was one of six nuns in the convent and another was Joan Harkey who was from a similar background. Details of Harkey's birth and early life are unknown, but at some point she was promoted from nun to prioress.

In 1536 Cromwell's commissioners arrived to inspect the convent as part of the Dissolution of the Monasteries. Harkey had to admit that one of her nuns, Cecily Swale, was asking to leave the convent. She wanted to leave after being released from her vows, but she had already given birth to at child. Not every monastery or convent was to be closed in this phase, but the priory was formally surrendered to the Crown in August that year and dissolved in 1537.

Harkey retired to Richmond where she enjoyed a small pension of three pounds a year. The priory's former nuns were not offered pensions and this may be the reason that two of them joined Nun Appleton Priory and Cecily Swale forgot about renouncing her vows and joined Swine nunnery.

== Legacy ==
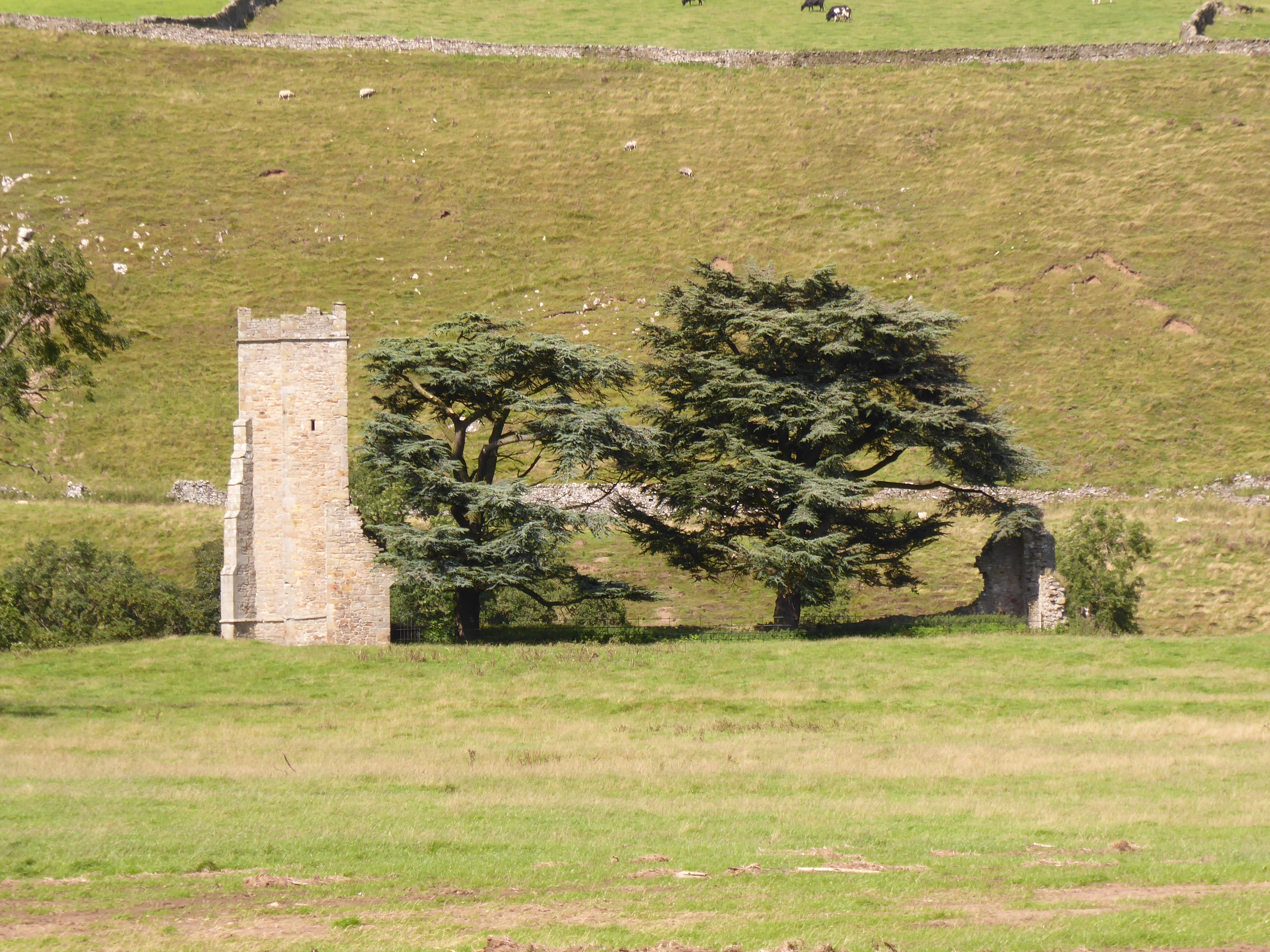
Ellerton Priory in ruins

Harvey died in 1550. Her long and detailed will left money to various causes including four of her former nuns. The named nuns received a shilling each included Cecily Swale. The convent's buildings are in ruins, but protected as a scheduled Ancient Monument and parts of the priory are grade II listed.
