= Listed buildings in Ellerton Abbey =

Ellerton Abbey is a civil parish in the county of North Yorkshire, England. It contains four listed buildings that are recorded in the National Heritage List for England. All the listed buildings are designated at Grade II, the lowest of the three grades, which is applied to "buildings of national importance and special interest". The parish does not contain any settlements, and the listed buildings consist of the ruins of a priory church, a house, a farmhouse with outbuildings, and a boundary stone.

== Buildings ==
Name and location	Photograph	Date	Notes
Ellerton Priory; 54.37191°N 1.87916°W		15th century (or earlier)	The ruins of a priory in stone, with quoins. The west tower has been restored, and the ruins include parts of the nave and the choir, rising to a height of between 1 metre (3 ft 3 in) and 3 metres (9.8 ft). The remaining original parts of the tower are stepped diagonal buttresses, a stair turret on the south, and a tower arch.
Swale Farmhouse and outbuildings 54.36920°N 1.88734°W	—	18th century	Two houses, later a farmhouse flanked by outbuildings, in stone, with quoins and a stone slate roof. There are two storeys, and the central house has four bays and a rear outshut. The windows are sashes, and the byre to the right contains a pitching door. In the outshut is a car shed with a round arch and sandstone voussoirs.
Ellerton Abbey; 54.37084°N 1.88107°W		c. 1830	The house is in stone, with sandstone dressings, quoins, a sill band, and a hipped stone slate roof. There are two storeys, a main range of two bays, and flanking rear wings, projecting slightly at the front. In the centre is a portico with two Doric columns in antis, and the windows are sashes. At the rear is a verandah on cast iron columns and a round-headed staircase window.
Heugh Nick Boundary Stone; 54.36569°N 1.91637°W		19th century	The parish boundary stone is unshaped and about 1 metre (3 ft 3 in) high. It is inscribed on the east face with "ED LS".
