= Walburn, North Yorkshire =

Hamlet and civil parish in North Yorkshire, England

Coordinates: 54.3588°N 1.8186°W

Walburn
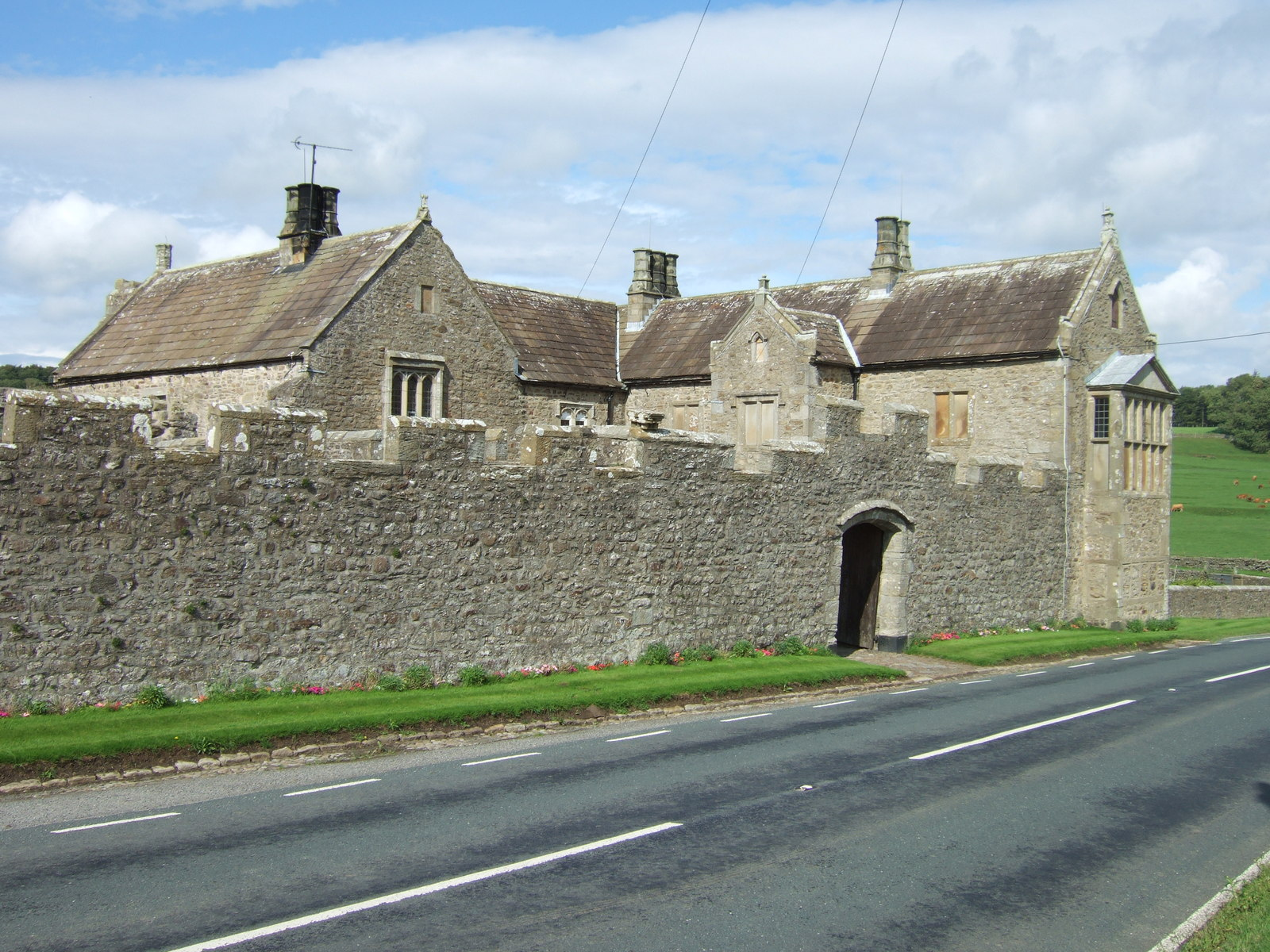
- Walburn Hall

- Location within North Yorkshire
- Population: 10
- OS grid reference: SE119959
- Civil parish: Walburn
- Unitary authority: North Yorkshire
- Ceremonial county: North Yorkshire
- Region: Yorkshire and the Humber
- Country: England
- Sovereign state: United Kingdom
- Post town: Richmond
- Postcode district: DL11
- Police: North Yorkshire
- Fire: North Yorkshire
- Ambulance: Yorkshire

Walburn is a hamlet and civil parish in North Yorkshire, England. It is located in lower Swaledale, 5 miles (8 km) south-west of Richmond. The population of the parish was estimated at 10 in 2016.

The army training camp of Wathgill is in the parish.

== History ==
The toponym is derived from the Old English wala "Britons or Welshmen" and burna "stream", indicating the presence of Britons in the area when the English arrived.

Walburn was historically a township in the parish of Downholme in the wapentake of Hang West in the North Riding of Yorkshire. From 1286 Walburn was held of the manor of Thornton Steward, whose lords were mesne tenants of the honour of Richmond.

Walburn became a separate civil parish in 1866. In 1974 it was transferred to the new county of North Yorkshire. From 1974 to 2023 it was part of the district of Richmondshire, it is now administered by the unitary North Yorkshire Council.

== Walburn Hall ==
Walburn Hall is a fortified house probably dating from the 12th century but much altered in the 15th and 16th centuries. It is a Grade I listed building, now used as a farmhouse.

== See also ==
- Listed buildings in Walburn, North Yorkshire
