= John Burridge (MP, died 1753) =

British merchant and Whig politician

John Burridge (c.1681 – 2 February 1753) of London and Lyme Regis, Dorset, was a British merchant and Whig politician who sat in the House of Commons from 1710 to 1728.

Burridge was the second son. of Robert Burridge merchant of Lyme Regis, and his wife Mary. He established himself as a London merchant and shipowner, trading to the West Indies, Spain and America but kept a business interest in the West country. He married Martha, Ledgingham, daughter of Warwick Ledgingham of Ottery St. Mary Devon in 1695. His wife had inherited the manor of Ottery St. Mary in Devon and his uncle, John Burridge. settled a reversionary life interest in the manor of Thorn Falcon in Somerset on him at the time of his marriage. Burridge later bought from his father the reversion of Charmouth in Dorset.

Burridge became a Freeman of Lyme Regis 1704, and obtained a political interest of his own by making a loan of £300 to the corporation and securing a mortgage on the town's waterworks. At the beginning of 1708, Burridge was one of the merchants whose complaints about shipping losses led to an inquiry in the Lords into the shortage of cruisers and convoys. At the 1710 general election he succeeded his uncle to what had virtually become the family seat at Lyme Regis. He soon made clear his Whig political allegiance by voting for the motion of ‘No Peace Without Spain’ on 7 December 1711. On 6 June 171, he told in favour of a bill to continue the Act enabling Quakers to affirm. He voted against the French wines duties bill on 6 May 1713. Marked as a Whig who was engaged in trade, Burridge also voted against the French commerce bill on 18 June 1713. He was returned unopposed for Lyme Regis at the 1713 general election and voted against the expulsion of Richard Steele on 18 March 1714.

Burridge was returned unopposed at the 1715 general election and voted with the Administration in all recorded divisions of the Parliament. In 1717 the Crown seized his estate for a debt of £2,600 for wine duties. He paid off over £1,000 by November, and intended to pay the rest in 8 or 10 months. He is mentioned in a report of the South Sea bubble inquiry as having accepted £2,000 stock from the Company on 17 March 1720 without paying for it. At the 1722 general election there was a contest and he was returned by his father who was the mayor. He became mayor himself for the year 1726 to 1727 and after a contest at the 1727 general election he returned himself. This was contrary a resolution of the House of Commons of 1685 and he was unseated on petition on 28 February 1728. On 15 August 1730, he applied to Walpole for assistance from the secret service funds on the grounds that he had served in parliament for nearly 20 years and had received little in return. He stood again for Lyme Regis at the 1734 general election, but was heavily defeated. In 1746 he petitioned George II in extravagant language, claiming that Walpole had promised him, in 1731, a further ‘secret service sum of £1,000’, which had not been paid.

Burridge died without issue on 2 February 1753.

Parliament of Great Britain
Preceded by Thomas Freke; John Burridge	Member of Parliament for Lyme Regis; 1710–1728; With: Henry Henley 1710-1715; John Henley 1715-1722; Henry Holt Henley 1722-1727; Henry Drax 1727-1728	Succeeded by Henry Drax; Henry Holt Henley
