= Walburn Hall =

Building in Walburn, North Yorkshire, England

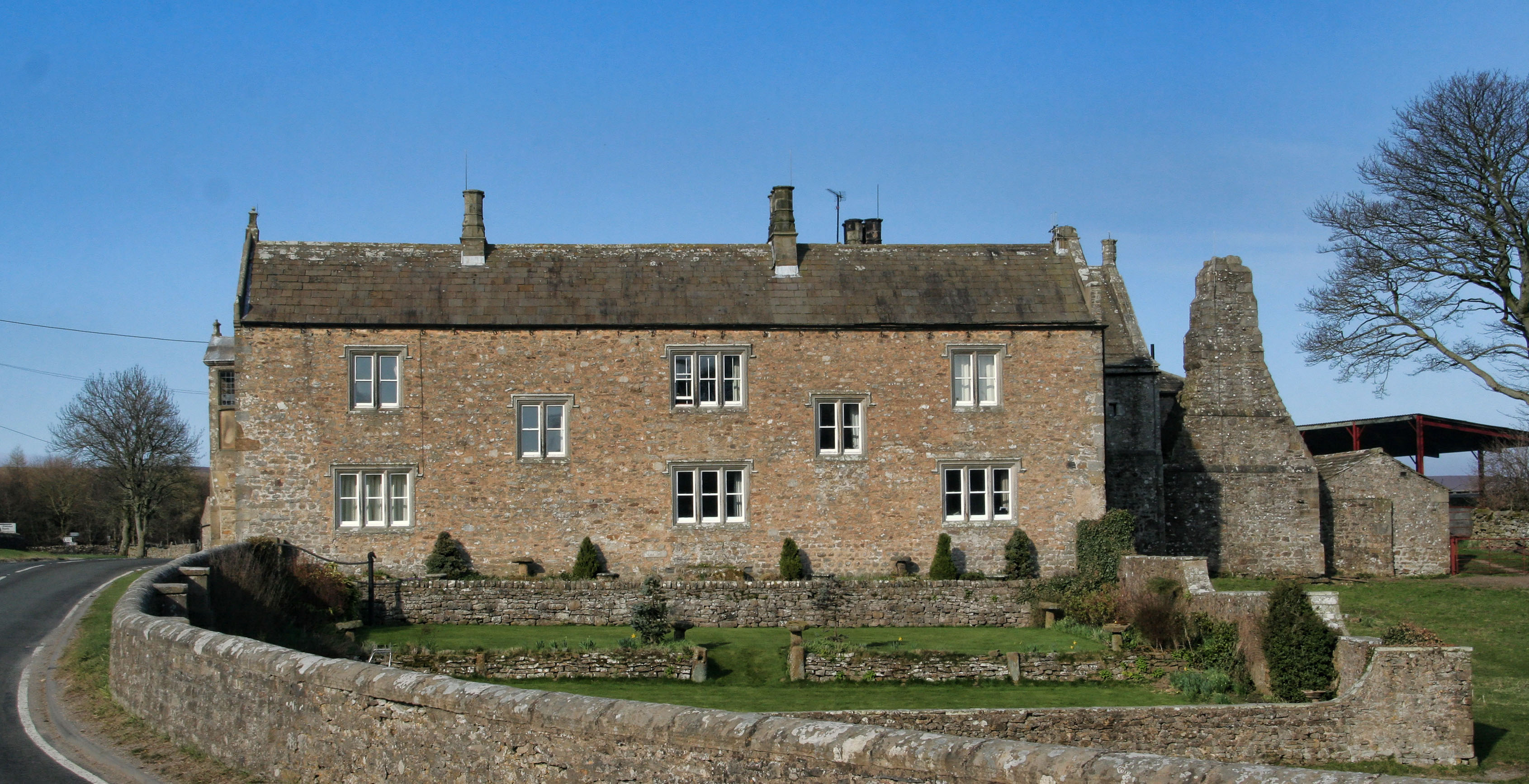
- The building in 2010

- Location within North Yorkshire

General information
- Type: Manor house
- Location: Walburn, North Yorkshire, England
- Coordinates: 54°04′37″N 0°50′56″W
- Year built: Late 15th century
- Renovated: Late 16th century (added); 19th century (restored)
- Client: Siggiswick family

Listed Building – Grade I
- Official name: Walburn Hall
- Designated: 4 February 1969
- Reference no.: 1179695

Listed Building – Grade II
- Official name: Courtyard walls of Walburn Hall
- Designated: 26 March 1986
- Reference no.: 1130831

Walburn Hall is a historic building in Walburn, North Yorkshire, a village in England.

The manor house was built in the late 15th century for the Siggiswick family, perhaps incorporating some elements of a 12th-century predecessor. A large cross-range was added in the late 16th century. Mary, Queen of Scots is said to have stayed at the property. At some point, much of the original section was demolished and the building became a farmhouse. In the early 19th century, the house was restored by Timothy Hutton, who removed most of the original internal features. The building was Grade I listed in 1969.

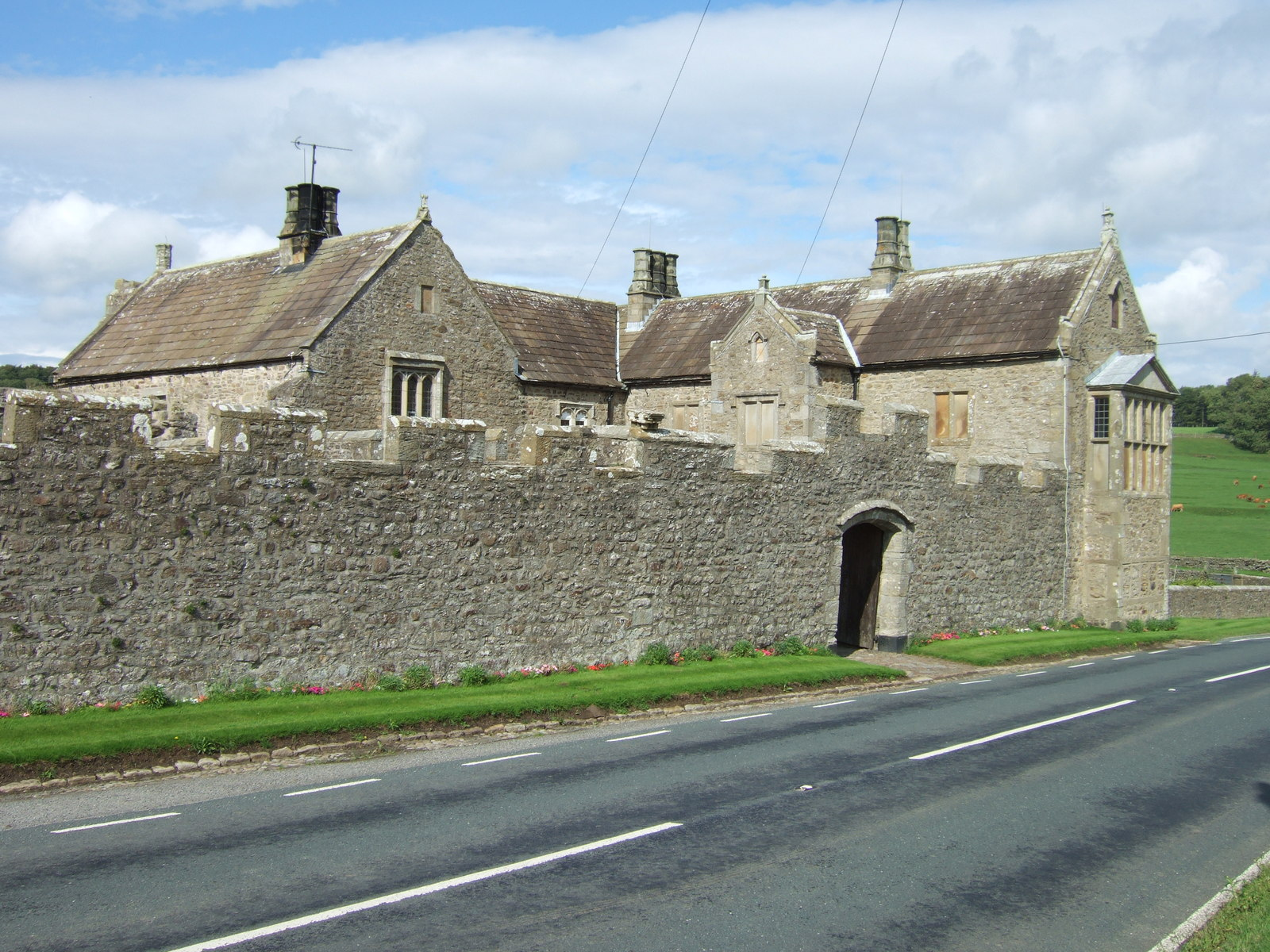
View from the southwest

The house is built of stone with quoins and a stone slate roof. It has two storeys and an irregular L-shaped plan with two small wings at the rear. The main range on the east side has a gabled tower porch containing a doorway, and a chamfered mullioned window, above which is a window with a four-centred arch, all with hood moulds. The gable has square kneelers, ridged coping, and a square pedestal finial. Most of the windows are mullioned or mullioned and transomed. Inside, the living room has a triangular-headed fireplace moved from elsewhere, and one upstairs room has Elizabethan panelling and an 18th-century chimneypiece. There is some stained glass, mostly by William Peckitt, along with one 15th-century roundel.

The 15th-century courtyard walls are Grade II listed. The walls are in stone, and about 4 metres (13 ft) in height. The front wall, which is about 12 metres (39 ft) in length, has feather-edged coping, and contains a doorway with a chamfered surround, a segmental arch and a hood mould. Inside it, there is a paved parapet walk, with steps in the northwest corner. The wall continues to the left, and contains a gateway.

== See also ==
- Grade I listed buildings in North Yorkshire (district)
- Listed buildings in Walburn, North Yorkshire
