= Robert Banks Hodgkinson =

Robert Banks Hodgkinson (traditional identification)

Robert Banks Hodgkinson (1721/2–1792), name at birth Robert Banks, was an English landowner, antiquarian and politician. He was elected a Fellow of the Royal Society in 1778.

== Early life ==
He was the third son of Joseph Banks (died 1741) of Revesby Abbey and his first wife Ann Hodgkinson (died 1730), daughter and heiress of William Hodgkinson (died 1731) of Overton Hall, Ashover in Derbyshire. He matriculated at Christ Church, Oxford in 1741.

== Land owner and lead mining ==
After his father's death, which was preceded by the death of his eldest brother, Robert Banks inherited the Overton estate, the second brother William Banks inheriting Revesby Abbey; and he added Hodgkinson as a surname in 1743.

Later in the century the lead mines at Overton became very profitable. Hodgkinson, a speculator in mines, was recorded by James Mander of Bakewell as owning a one-seventh share in the Ashover closed mineral liberty, the largest share being held by the Rev. Laurence Bourne (died 1797), vicar of Dronfield and rector of Ashover.

The inclosure Act of 1779 for Ashover was one of a number of such acts of the period for non-arable land that preserved tithing; this business decision saw advantage for landlords in tithe payments rather than the customary long leases. Hodgkinson was one of the joint lords of the manor of Ashover at the 1779 enclosure of common land. As such he was paid a cope or "ancient tribute", a local word. He also from 1758 developed the Gregory vein at Overton in consortium with John Wilkinson and others.

== In politics ==
Hodgkinson had a seat in the House of Commons for Wareham from 1748. In the 1747 general election he had stood as one of four candidates in the two-member Dorset constituency, coming bottom of the poll below John Pitt. Henry Drax and Thomas Erle Drax of the Barbados planter family were returned; but on petition many of the Drax votes were discounted, disqualified as derived from recently-acquired properties. The result was that Drax father and son, associated with Frederick, Prince of Wales, lost their seats, with Pitt and Hodgkinson, who supported the Broad Bottom ministry, replacing them. Hodgkinson did not stand again in 1754.

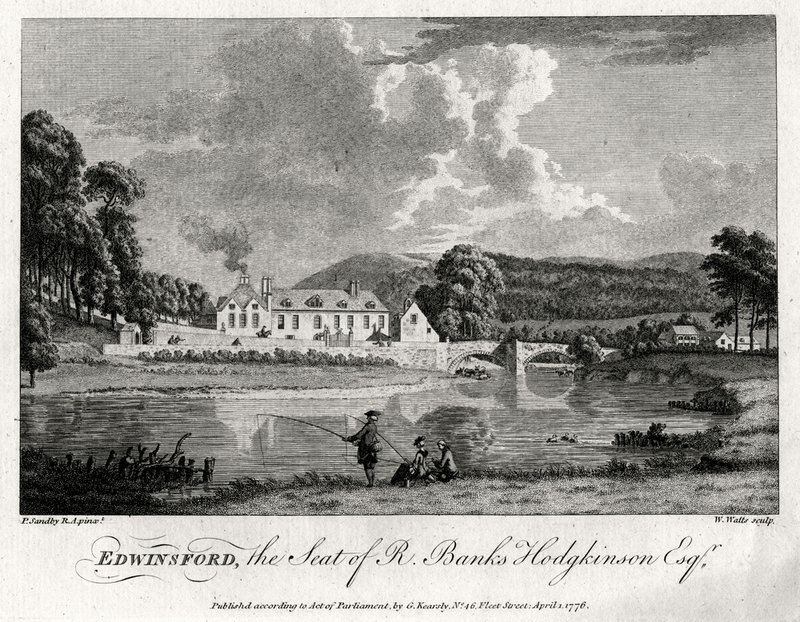
Edwinsford, the seat of R. Banks Hodgkinson, Esq., 1776 engraving after Paul Sandby

Edwinsford Estate bridge, 2001 photograph

== Later life ==
In 1762, on the death of his father-in-law, Hodgkinson took over the management of the Welsh Edwinsford estate settled on his wife Bridget. He subscribed £50 to the building of the Derby Assembly Rooms. He was High Sheriff of Carmarthenshire in 1784. In 1783 the bridge over the River Cothi on the estate had been rebuilt by William Edwards.

Hodgkinson's father had been an antiquarian, belonging to the Society of Antiquaries of London and the Spalding Gentlemen's Society, as well as the Royal Society. Hodgkinson himself was a Fellow of the Society of Antiquaries, where he associated with William Stukeley. Samuel Pegge wrote to him letters about finds of Roman pig lead. He was elected to the Society of Arts in 1761. He was elected a Fellow of the Royal Society on 30 April 1778.

== Death ==
Following his wife Bridget's death on 14 July 1792, Robert Banks Hodgkinson committed suicide on 11 November 1792.

== Family ==
Hodgkinson married in 1757 Bridget Williams, daughter of Thomas Williams (died 1762) of Edwinsford, Carmarthenshire. The couple had no children. There is a memorial tablet in the North Gallery of St Mary's Church, Battersea. His heir was his nephew Sir Joseph Banks; after the death in 1761 of Joseph's father William, Hodgkinson acted informally as his guardian, jointly with his mother Sarah.

The executors of Hodgkinson's estate were Banks and Henry Hawley, from 1795 1st Baronet. His properties included a London town house on New Burlington Street, and Heston House, Middlesex. Hawley was the son of the physician James Hawley FRS and Elizabeth Banks, Hodgkinson's sister.
