= Downholme =

Village and civil parish in North Yorkshire, England

Coordinates: 54°22′36″N 1°49′38″W

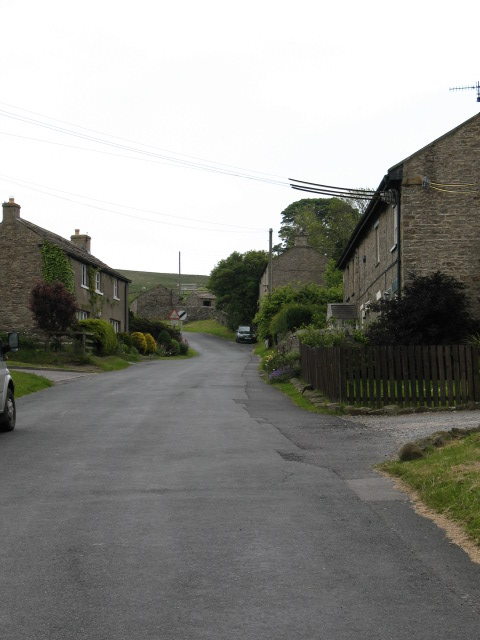
- Village street in Downholme

- Location within North Yorkshire
- OS grid reference: SE111978
  - London: 210 mi (340 km) S
- Unitary authority: North Yorkshire
- Ceremonial county: North Yorkshire
- Region: Yorkshire and the Humber
- Country: England
- Sovereign state: United Kingdom
- Post town: RICHMOND
- Postcode district: DL11
- Police: North Yorkshire
- Fire: North Yorkshire
- Ambulance: Yorkshire
- UK Parliament: Richmond and Northallerton

Downholme is a village and civil parish in North Yorkshire, England. It is situated approximately 4 miles (6 km) west from the market town of Richmond and 16 miles (26 km) west from the county town of Northallerton. The village lies close to the edge of the Yorkshire Dales. The population as taken in the ONS Census of 2011 was less than 100, so details are included in the parish of Hudswell. In 2015, North Yorkshire County Council estimated the population of the village to be 50.

== History ==
The village is mentioned in the Domesday Book as "Dune" with the manor belonging to Count Alan of Brittany. The lordship of the manor was granted by the Count to Gospatric, son of Arnketil around the time of the Norman Conquest. There were two ploughlands with a taxable value of 3 geld units. The manor came into the possession of Thomas de Richeburg before passing to the Leyburn family around 1184. Over the following years they granted the manor piecemeal to the abbey of St Agatha at Easby. The abbey then granted the manor lands to the Cleasby family by the middle of the 13th century. Around 1314, the Cleasby's passed the manor on to the Scrope family of Castle Bolton.

The etymology of the name is derived from the Old English word dūn meaning hill. As can be seen from the Domesday Book entry, the suffix of -holme, Old English holegn for holly, was added a later date.

== Geography and governance ==
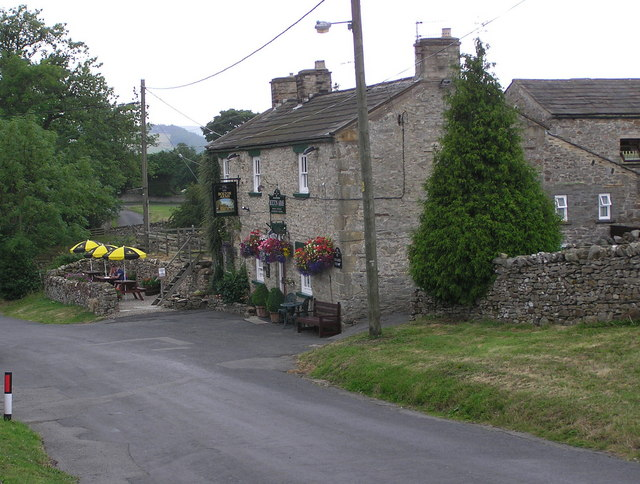
Bolton Arms, Downholme

The village lies on the A6108 road between Leyburn and Richmond on a section called Walburn Head. The nearest settlements of Marske, Hudswell, Stainton and Marrick all lie within 2.5 miles (4 km) of the village. Church Gill, which has a small waterfall, runs north through the village to join the nearby River Swale, whilst other small waterways to the east of the village drain away to Risedale Beck. The village gives its name to the Moor between it and nearby Hudswell Moor. The high point is Seat How at 312 metres (1,024 ft) to the south-east of the village. There are visible signs of old quarries and coal and lead mining shafts on the hillsides surrounding the village. There is also evidence of a Bronze Age univallate hill fort on How Hill to the immediate west of the village. The geology of the area is made of Yoredale rock, Limestone, Shale and Millstone Grit covered by Clay.

The village lies within the Richmond and Northallerton UK Parliament constituency. From 1974 to 2023 it was part of the district of Richmondshire, it is now administered by the unitary North Yorkshire Council.

In 2012, the neighbouring Hudswell Parish Council put forward a proposal to merge the two parishes.

== Demography ==
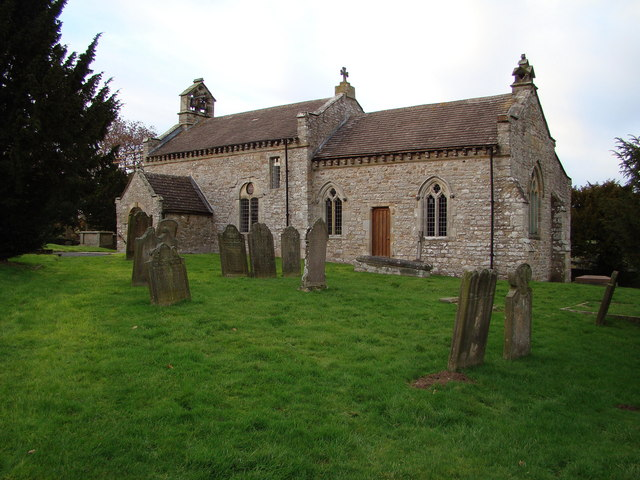
St Michael and All Saints, Downholme

Population
Year	1801	1811	1821	1831	1841	1851	1881	1891	1901	1911	1921	1931	1951	1961
Total	193	325	204	174	192	202	112	732	93	66	76	74	77	65

For the 2001 and 2011 UK Censuses, the Parishes of Hudswell and Downholme were combined.

== Community ==
The village of Downholme has its own public house, the Bolton Arms, which first featured in the UK Good Pub Guide 2011 and in the current online edition. St Michael and All Angels' Church, Downholme, to the north of the village, is within the ecclesiastical parish of Downholme and Maske, in the Diocese of Leeds. Of Norman construction with a substantial restoration in 1886, it is a Grade II listed building.

== See also ==
- Listed buildings in Downholme
