= Thomas Erle Drax =

English politician (1721–1789)

Member of Parliament for Corfe Castle
- In office 1744–1747

Member of Parliament for Wareham
- In office 1761 – March 1768

Personal details
- Born: 1721
- Died: December 1789 (aged 67–68)
- Party: Tory
- Relations: Plunkett-Ernle-Erle-Drax family

Thomas Erle Drax (1721 – December 1789) was an English Tory politician. He served as a Member of Parliament for constituencies in Dorset in the 18th century. He was the son of Henry Drax, British MP and owner of slave plantations in Barbados and Jamaica.

== Political career ==
Drax was MP for Corfe Castle from 1744 to 1747, and went on to be MP for Wareham between 1761 and March 1768.

== Slave ownership ==
Drax owned plantations in Barbados and Jamaica, and he represented the interests of the planter class in the House of Commons.

== Personal life ==
He was a member of the Plunkett-Ernle-Erle-Drax family and lived at Charborough House.

== See also ==
- List of MPs elected in the 1741 British general election
- List of MPs elected in the 1754 British general election
- List of MPs elected in the 1761 British general election
