= Marrick =

Village and civil parish in North Yorkshire, England

Coordinates: 54°22′46″N 1°52′57″W

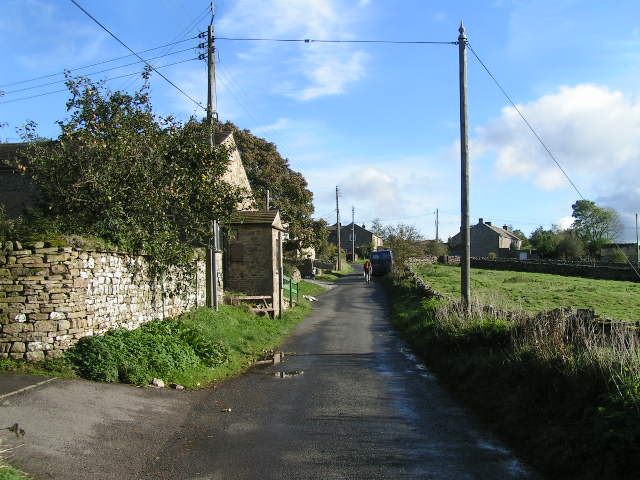
- Marrick

- Location within North Yorkshire
- Population: 148 (2011 census)
- OS grid reference: SE076982
- Unitary authority: North Yorkshire
- Ceremonial county: North Yorkshire
- Region: Yorkshire and the Humber
- Country: England
- Sovereign state: United Kingdom
- Post town: RICHMOND
- Postcode district: DL11
- Police: North Yorkshire
- Fire: North Yorkshire
- Ambulance: Yorkshire

Marrick is a village and civil parish in the county of North Yorkshire, England, situated in lower Swaledale in the Yorkshire Dales National Park, the village is approximately 9 miles (14 km) west of Richmond. The parish of Marrick also includes the hamlets of Hurst and Washfold, according to the UK 2011 Census, the population of the parish was 148.

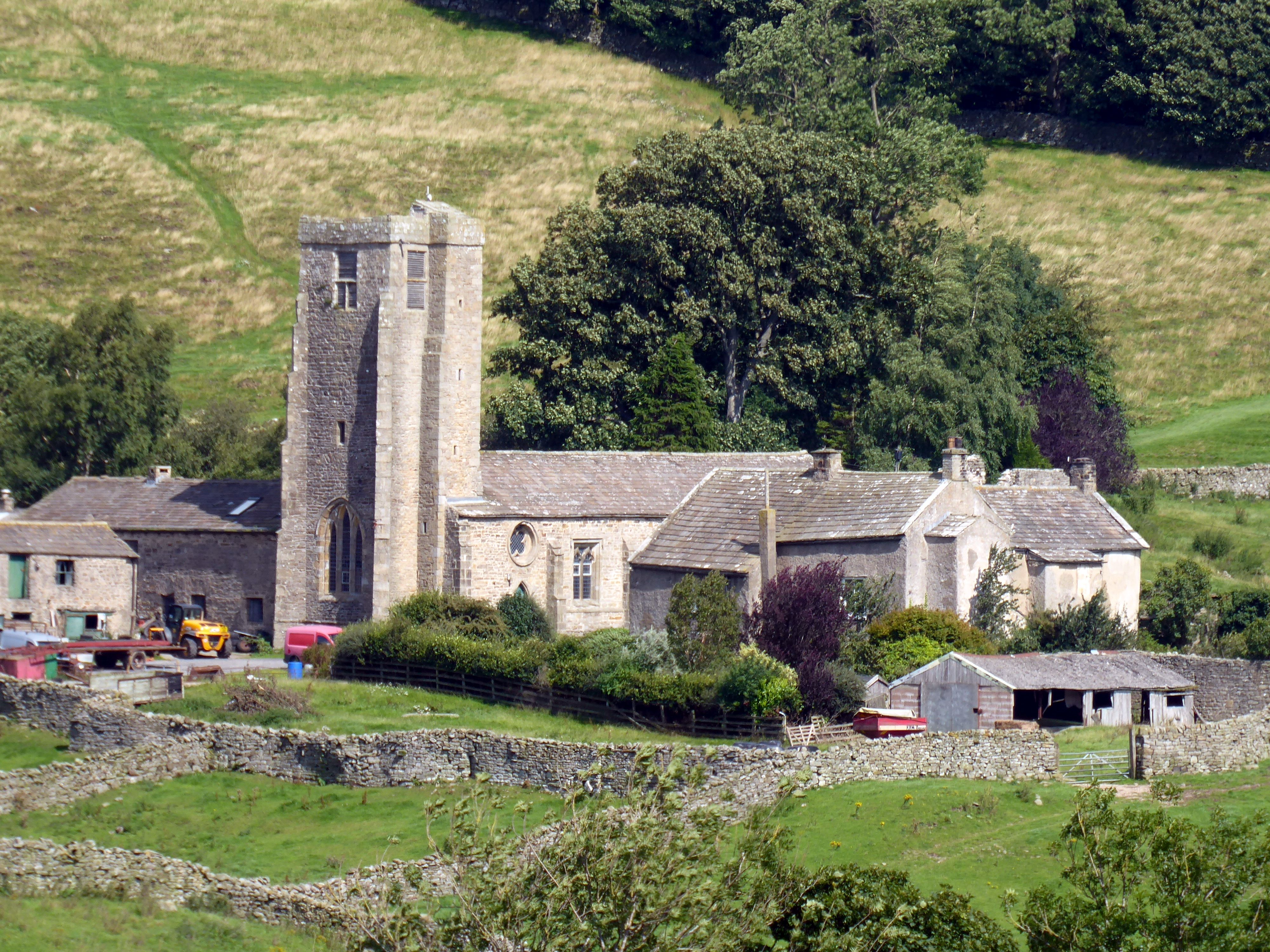
Marrick Priory

== History ==
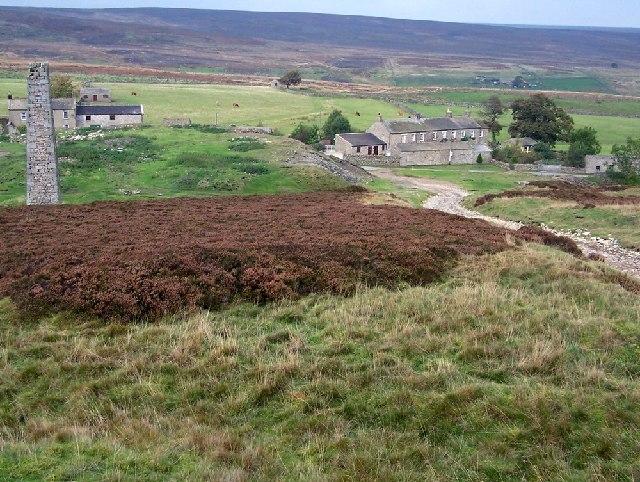
Hurst, showing the chimney of the disused lead smelter

Marrick Priory, a former Benedictine nunnery dating back to the 12th century was the site of the local place of worship, the Church of the Virgin Mary and St. Andrew until its conversion into a farm building in 1948, and later an outdoor education and residential centre for young people.

The hamlet of Hurst, 4 miles (6.4 km) to the north was a mining centre in the 19th century.

Marrickville in Sydney, Australia is named after Marrick, North Yorkshire.

== Governance ==
The village lies within the Richmond and Northallerton parliamentary constituency, which is under the control of the Conservative Party. The current Member of Parliament, since the 2015 general election, is Rishi Sunak. From 1974 to 2023 it was part of the district of Richmondshire, it is now administered by the unitary North Yorkshire Council.

== Notable people ==
- Birthplace of racehorse breeder William Blenkiron.

== See also ==
- Listed buildings in Marrick
