= Sir Thomas Winnington, 3rd Baronet =

English Whig and Liberal politician

Sir Thomas Winnington, Bt

Member of Parliament for Bewdley
- In office 1833–1837
- Preceded by: Wilson Aylesbury Roberts
- Succeeded by: Thomas Winnington

Member of Parliament for Droitwich
- In office 1831–1832 Serving with John Hodgetts-Foley
- Preceded by: The Earl of Sefton; John Hodgetts-Foley
- Succeeded by: John Hodgetts-Foley
- In office 1807–1816 Serving with Andrew Foley
- Preceded by: Andrew Foley; Thomas Foley
- Succeeded by: Andrew Foley; The Earl of Sefton

Personal details
- Born: Thomas Edward Winnington; 1780
- Died: 24 September 1839 (aged 58–59)
- Party: Whig, Liberal
- Spouse: Joanna Taylor (after 1810)
- Relations: Sir Edward Winnington, 1st Baronet (grandfather); Thomas Foley, 1st Baron Foley (grandfather)
- Children: 7
- Parent(s): Sir Edward Winnington, 2nd Baronet; Hon. Anne Foley
- Education: Eton College
- Alma mater: Christ Church, Oxford

Sir Thomas Edward Winnington (1780 – 24 September 1839) was an English Whig and Liberal politician who sat in the House of Commons in two periods between 1807 and 1837.

== Early life ==
Winnington was the eldest son of the Hon. Anne Foley and Sir Edward Winnington, 2nd Baronet of Stanford Court, Stanford-on-Teme, Worcestershire. Among his siblings were the Rev. Edward Winnington-Ingram, the Rev. Francis Winnington-Ingram, the Rev. Charles Fox Winnington-Ingram, Henry Jeffries Winnington, Elizabeth Winnington (wife of the Rev. Arthur Cyril Onslow and parents of Cyril Onslow), and Harriet Winnington (the wife of Phipps Vanstittart Onslow).

His paternal grandfather was Sir Edward Winnington, 1st Baronet. His maternal grandparents were Thomas Foley, 1st Baron Foley and Hon. Grace Granville (a daughter of George Granville, 1st Baron Lansdowne).

Winnington attended Eton College from where he graduated in 1793, followed by Christ Church, Oxford, from where he graduated on 6 February 1798.

== Career ==
He inherited the Stanford Court estate from his father in 1805 and was appointed High Sheriff of Worcestershire for 1806 to 1807.

Winnington was elected Member of Parliament (MP) for Droitwich in 1807 and held the seat until 1816. He was re elected in the 1831 general election and held the seat for a year. At the 1832 general election he was elected MP for Bewdley and held the seat until 1837, when he was succeeded there by his son Thomas.

== Personal life ==
On 11 November 1810, Winnington married Joanna Taylor, the daughter of John Taylor of Moseley Hall, with whom he had three sons and four daughters, including:

- Sir Thomas Edward Winnington (1811–1872), who married Helen Domvile, a daughter of Sir Compton Domvile, 1st Baronet and the former Helena Sarah Trench (a daughter of Frederick Trench, MP for Maryborough).

Sir Thomas died on 24 September 1839 and was succeeded in the baronetcy by his eldest surviving son, Thomas.

Parliament of the United Kingdom
Preceded by Andrew Foley; Thomas Foley	Member of Parliament for Droitwich; 1807–1816; With: Andrew Foley	Succeeded by Andrew Foley; The Earl of Sefton
Preceded by The Earl of Sefton; John Hodgetts-Foley	Member of Parliament for Droitwich; 1831–1832; With: John Hodgetts-Foley	Succeeded by John Hodgetts-Foley
Preceded by Wilson Aylesbury Roberts	Member of Parliament for Bewdley; 1832–1837	Succeeded by Thomas Winnington
Baronetage of Great Britain
Preceded by Edward Winnington	Baronet (of Stanford Court); 1791–1805	Succeeded by Thomas Winnington
