= Thomas Foley, 2nd Baron Foley (1742–1793) =

British peer and politician

The Right Honourable The Lord Foley

Member of Parliament for Droitwich
- In office 1774–1777 Serving with Andrew Foley
- Preceded by: Rowland Berkeley; Andrew Foley
- Succeeded by: Andrew Foley; Sir Edward Winnington, Bt

Member of Parliament for Herefordshire
- In office 1767–1774 Serving with Velters Cornewall, Thomas Foley
- Preceded by: Velters Cornewall; Sir John Morgan, Bt
- Succeeded by: Robert Harley; Edward Foley

Personal details
- Born: Thomas Foley; 24 June 1742
- Died: 2 July 1793 (aged 51)
- Spouse: Lady Henrietta Stanhope (m. 1776; died 1781)
- Children: 2
- Parent(s): Thomas Foley, 1st Baron Foley; Hon. Grace Granville
- Relatives: Edward Foley (brother)
- Education: Westminster School
- Alma mater: Magdelen College, Oxford

Thomas Foley, 2nd Baron Foley (24 June 1742 – 2 July 1793) of Witley Court in Worcestershire, was a British peer and politician who sat in the House of Commons from 1767 to 1777 when he was raised to the peerage.

== Early life ==
Foley was born on 24 June 1742 as the eldest son of Thomas Foley, 1st Baron Foley, and the former Hon. Grace Granville. His mother was the third daughter and co-heiress of George Granville, 1st Baron Lansdowne and Lady Mary Villiers (only daughter of Edward Villiers, 1st Earl of Jersey).

He was educated at Westminster School from 1753 and matriculated at Magdalen College, Oxford, in 1759.

== Career ==
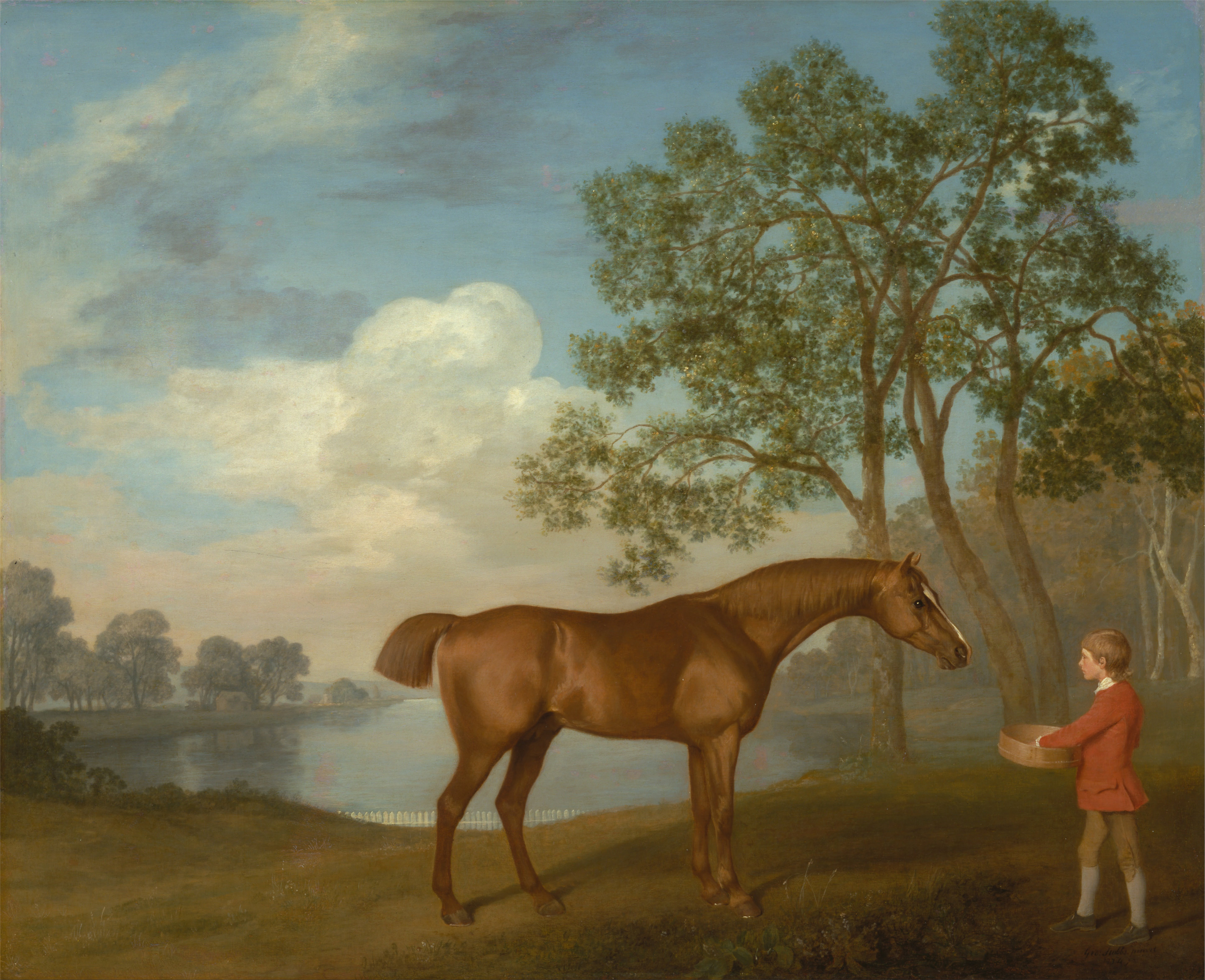
1774 painting by George Stubbs of Pumpkin, one of 2nd Baron Foley's racehorses

Foley was returned unopposed as Member of Parliament for Herefordshire at a by-election on 18 May 1767 and retained his seat at the 1768 general election. At the 1774 general election he was returned as MP for the family borough of Droitwich until he succeeded to his father's peerage in 1777. Foley was a close friend of Charles James Fox, and was a gambler. Mrs Delany a society gossip, and cousin of Foley, wrote in 1773 "Mr. T. Foley has lost at Newmarket etc. fifty thousand pounds. He has now entered into an agreement with his father, that if he will pay his debts he will entirely leave off gambling." In November 1775 George Selwyn wrote "Old Foley pays another £70,000 of debt, and settles, I hear today, £4,000 in present upon his son, and £6,000 a year more at his death." He was appointed joint Postmaster-General in 1783 for nine months.

=== Inheritance ===
The family estate at Stoke Edith had been entailed to Foley under his parents' marriage settlement, but both he and his next brother, Edward, were profligate spenders. When his father paid Foley's debts in 1773 (mortgaging his estates), this Thomas conveyed his interest in the Stoke Edith estate to his father. The father had also inherited, in 1766, the Great Witley estate from his cousin, the 2nd Lord Foley of the first creation. This enabled the father (in his will) to divide his estates between his three sons.

Thomas' share was the extensive Great Witley estate, but excluding the manor of Malvern and estates that his cousin had bought from Lord Montfort (which were included in Edward's share). However, this Thomas did not immediately become entitled to the estates, but only to an annuity. The balance of the income was applied to paying his debts. After his death in 1793, there were still unpaid debts, which the creditors exchanged for annuities terminating in 1808. By that time, his own son, also named Thomas, had come of age. In the meantime it had been necessary to obtain two private Acts of Parliament (in 1778 and 1796) to enable the trustees to make sales of parts of the estates, grant leases, and otherwise deal with the settled estate.

Thomas Foley was known to his contemporaries as "Lord Balloon", because of his girth. He was a friend of architect John Nash.

== Personal life ==
On 20 March 1776, Foley married Lady Henrietta Stanhope (1750–1781), fourth daughter of William Stanhope, 2nd Earl of Harrington and the former Lady Caroline FitzRoy (eldest daughter of Charles FitzRoy, 2nd Duke of Grafton). (Note: Charles FitzRoy, 2nd Duke of Grafton was the only child and heir of Henry FitzRoy, 1st Duke of Grafton (an illegitimate son of King Charles II by his mistress Barbara Villiers) by his wife Isabella Bennet, 2nd Countess of Arlington, a great-granddaughter of William the Silent.) Together, they were the parents of two children:

- Thomas Foley, 3rd Baron Foley (1780-1833), who married Lady Cecilia FitzGerald, fifth daughter of William FitzGerald, 2nd Duke of Leinster and Hon. Emilia St George (only daughter and heiress of St George St George, 1st Baron St George), in 1806.
- Hon. Caroline Georgiana Harriet Foley (d. 1843), who married Christopher Bethell-Codrington, of Dodington Park, eldest son and heir of Edward Codrington by his wife Rebecca le Sturgeon, in 1796.

Lady Foley died on 2 January 1781 and was buried at Witley. He died on 2 July 1793. After Foley's death, his son Thomas commissioned Nash to add porticoes to the north and south sides of Witley Court.

Parliament of Great Britain
Preceded by Velters Cornewall; Sir John Morgan, Bt	Member of Parliament for Herefordshire; 1767–1774; With: Velters Cornewall 1767–1768; Thomas Foley 1768–1774	Succeeded by Robert Harley; Edward Foley
Preceded by Rowland Berkeley; Andrew Foley	Member of Parliament for Droitwich; 1774–1777; With: Andrew Foley	Succeeded by Andrew Foley; Sir Edward Winnington, Bt
Peerage of Great Britain
Preceded by Thomas Foley	Baron Foley; 2nd creation 1777–1793	Succeeded by Thomas Foley
