= Witley Court =

Manor house near Great Witley, Worcestershire, England

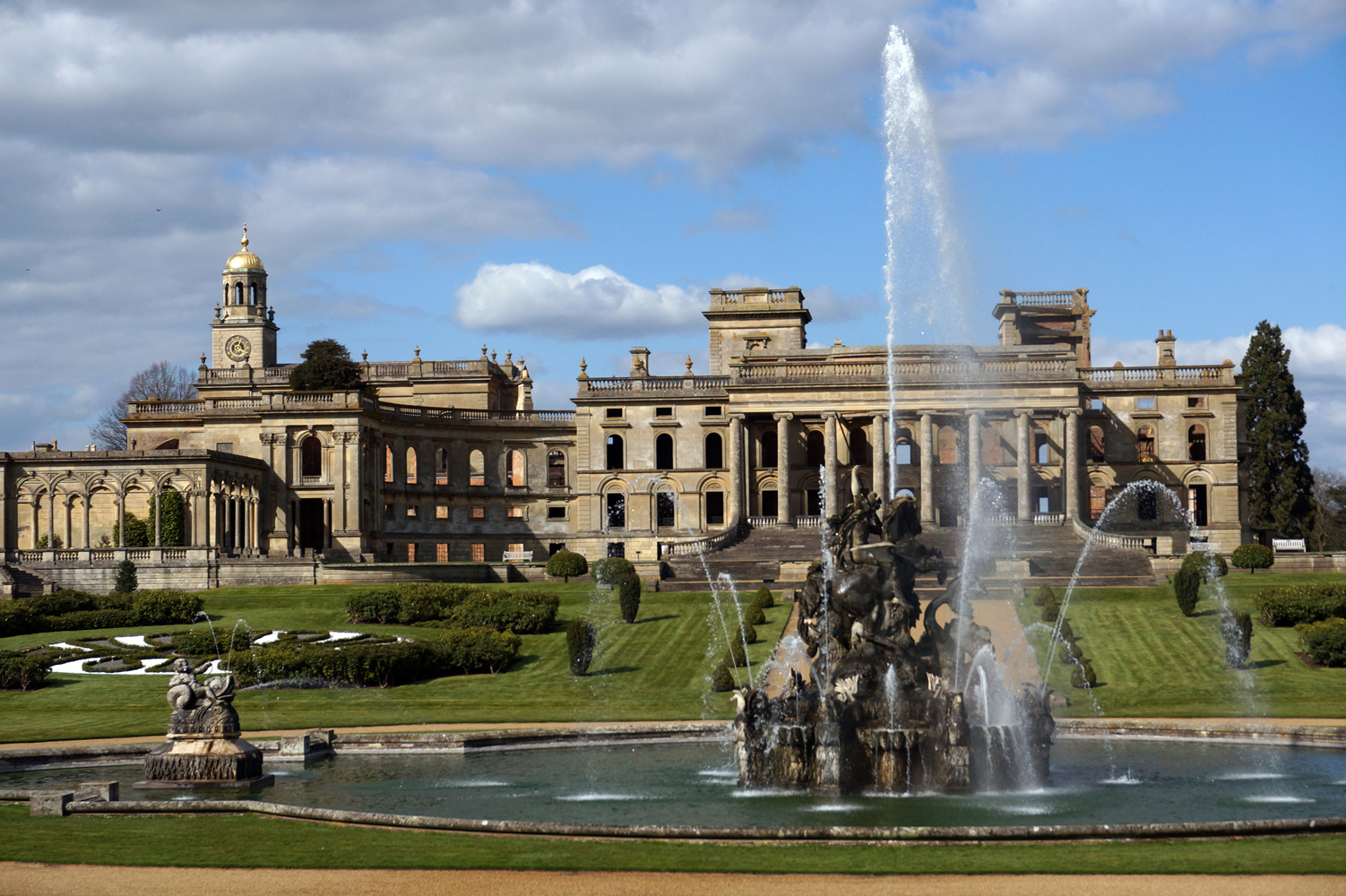
- Witley Court and the Perseus and Andromeda Fountain

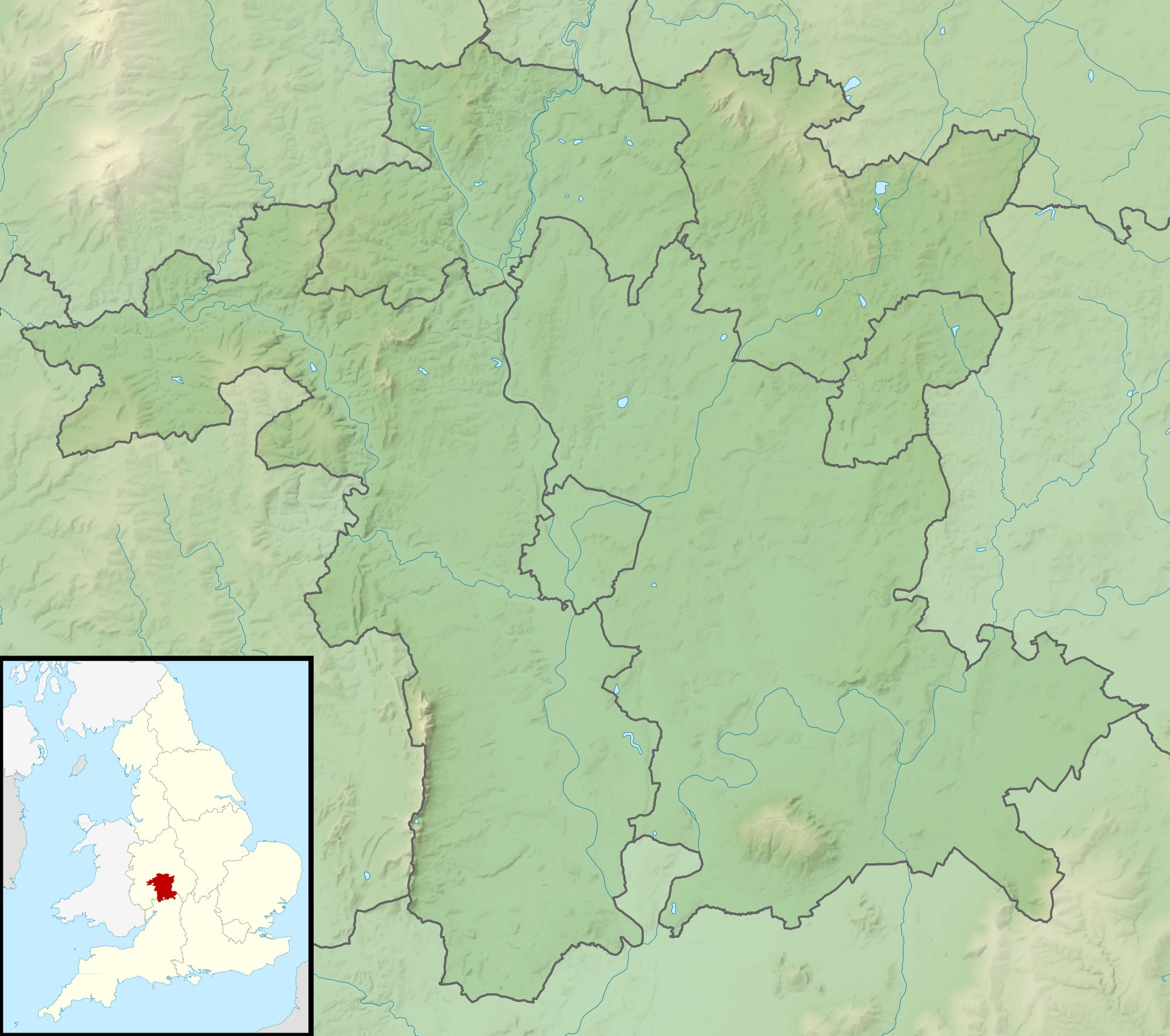
- Location within Worcestershire
- 52.2821°N 2.3388°W
- Type: House
- Location: Great Witley, Worcestershire, England

Site notes
- Architect(s): John Nash, Samuel Daukes
- Architectural style: Italianate
- Governing body: English Heritage

Listed Building – Grade I
- Official name: Witley Court and Link to Church of St Michael, Great Witley
- Designated: 12 November 1951
- Reference no.: 1082656

Witley Court, in Great Witley, Worcestershire, England, is a ruined Italianate mansion. Built for the Foleys in the seventeenth century on the site of a former manor house, it was enormously expanded in the early nineteenth century by the architect John Nash for Thomas Foley, 3rd Baron Foley.

The estate was later sold to the Earls of Dudley, who undertook a second massive reconstruction in the mid-19th century, employing the architect Samuel Daukes to create one of the great palaces of Victorian and Edwardian England.

The declining fortune of the Dudleys saw the sale of the court after the First World War to a Kidderminster carpet manufacturer. In 1937 a major fire caused great damage to the court, the estate was broken up and sold and the house was subsequently stripped of its fittings and furnishings. Forty years of decay followed before the house and grounds were taken into the care of the Department of the Environment in 1972. Since that point, significant restoration and stabilisation have secured the house as a spectacular ruin.

Witley Court, and the attached Church of St Michael and All Angels, are both Grade I listed buildings.

== History ==
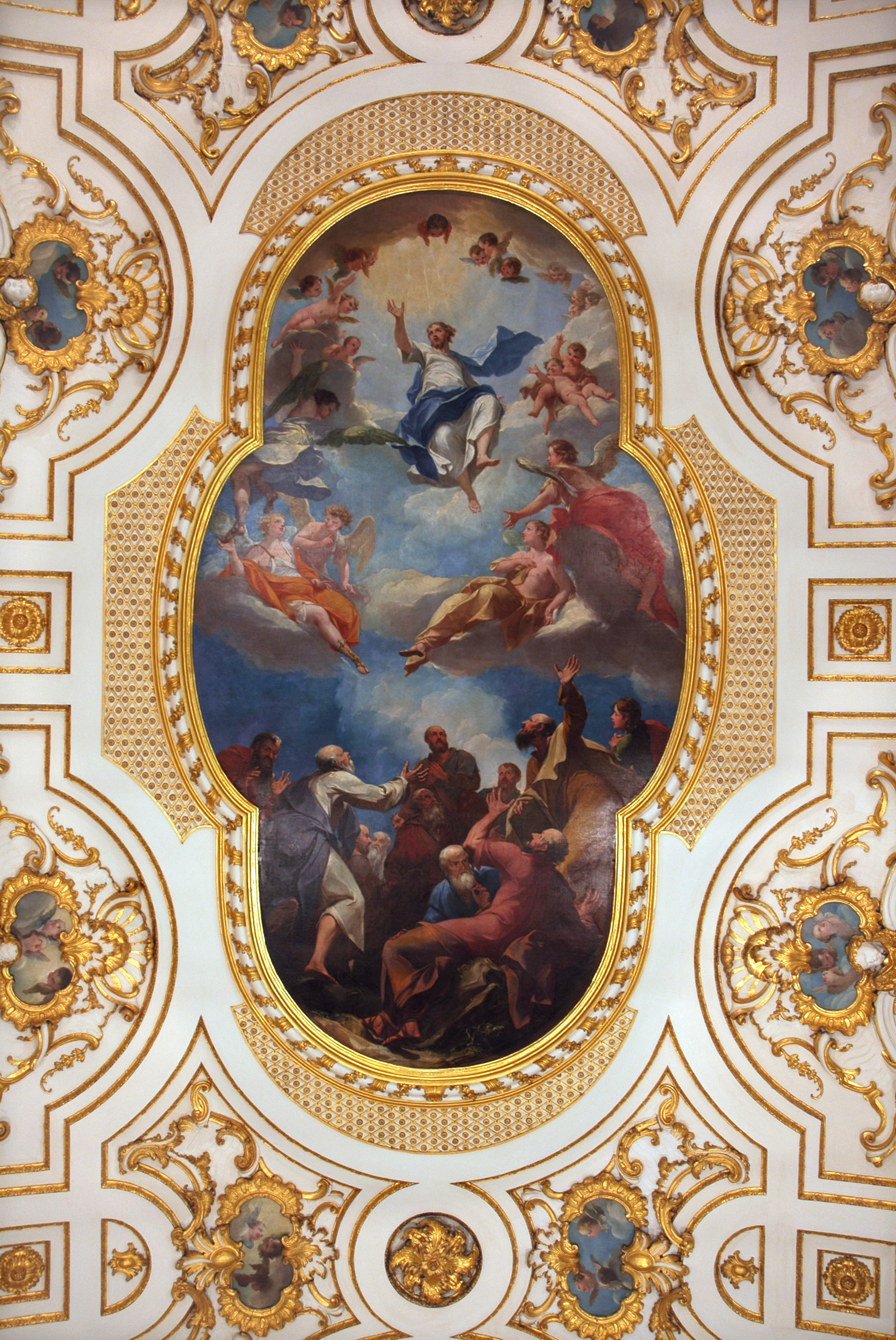
Ascension of Jesus Christ by Antonio Bellucci – ceiling painting in Great Witley Church, the former Chapel of the House

=== 16th-18th centuries ===
The earliest building on the site was a Jacobean brick house constructed by the Russell family. After the Civil War the house was sold to Thomas Foley (1616-1677), an ironmaster. He erected two towers on the north side of the house and his grandson Thomas Foley, 1st Baron Foley (1716–1777) added the wings which enclose the entrance courtyard.

In 1735 the Thomas Foley, 2nd Baron Foley (1742–1793) constructed a new parish church to the west of this courtyard, an undertaking begun by his father. The church was given a baroque interior in 1747, when he commissioned James Gibbs to incorporate paintings and furnishings acquired at the auction of the contents of Cannons House. Once reconstructed, the Church interior included painted panels by Antonio Bellucci, and ten hand painted windows by Joshua Price of London, based on the designs of Francesco Slater.

In the second half of the 18th century the park was landscaped. This included the relocation of the village of Great Witley, which came too close to the south front (rear) of the house. In about 1805 Thomas Foley, 3rd Baron Foley (1780–1833) employed John Nash to carry out a major reconstruction of the house, including the addition of huge ionic porticoes to the north and south fronts.

=== 19th century ===
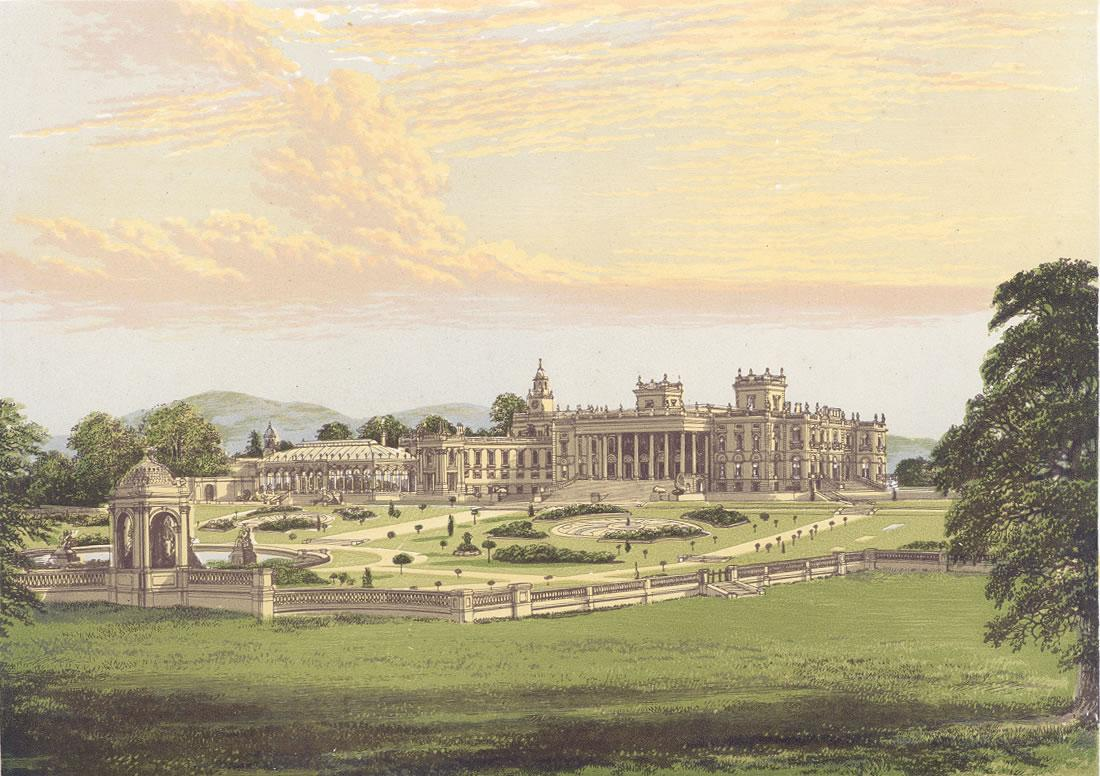
Witley Court in 1880

In 1837 serious debt forced Thomas Foley, 4th Baron Foley (1808–1869) to sell the estate to the trustees of William Ward, 11th Baron Ward (1817–1885, later 1st Earl of Dudley), who had inherited a great fortune from the coal and iron industries in the Black Country.

From 1843 to 1846 Witley Court was loaned to Queen Adelaide, the widow of King William IV. Whilst at Witley Court she had two chaplains – John Ryle Wood, Canon of Worcester and Thomas Pearson, Rector of Great Witley.

In the 1850s, Lord Ward engaged the architect Samuel Daukes, who had already altered his London house, Dudley House on Park Lane and the church at Great Witley, to remodel the house in Italianate style using ashlar stone cladding over the existing red brickwork. He also commissioned the garden designer William Andrews Nesfield to transform the gardens.

In 1885 Lord Dudley died and his son William Humble Ward, 2nd Earl of Dudley (1867–1932) inherited the property. His wife was Rachel Ward, Countess of Dudley (née Rachel Gurney).

=== 20th–21st centuries ===
In 1920 Witley Court was sold by the 2nd Earl to Sir Herbert Smith, 1st Baronet, a Kidderminster carpet manufacturer. Sir Herbert maintained only a skeleton staff to manage the house whilst he and his family were away, and many areas were left unused. A major accidental fire broke out in September 1937, whilst Sir Herbert was at another of his houses. It started in the bakery situated in the basement room of the now least preserved tower. The staff tried to put the fire out with the ancient fire pump, which was connected to the fountain, but it failed to work as it had not been maintained for many years. Although only one wing of the house was gutted by the fire and the rest of it was almost intact, the insurance company declined to cover the major damage, so Sir Herbert resolved to sell the property.

The estate was broken up and sold in lots. The house was bought by scrap dealers who stripped what they could from the house, leaving it an empty shell. In 1972 the remnants of the house and garden (excluding the church) were taken into care by the government, via a compulsory guardianship order. The ruins today are still spectacular, and the property is in the care of English Heritage.

A video made in 1967 by the band Procol Harum for their song "A Whiter Shade of Pale", used Witley Court as the location. At this time the site was completely derelict. Saint Michael and All Angels Church, which is attached to the ruins, survived the fire.

In 2003 Witley Court's owners, the Wigington family of Stratford-upon-Avon, who had acquired it in 1953 for £20,000, placed the freehold for sale on eBay for £975,000. The management arrangement with English Heritage was to remain unchanged. The sale was re-launched 2008 and Witley was sold for less than £900,000.

The ruins were featured prominently in the 2016 British TV miniseries Close to the Enemy.

== Architecture ==
The original manor of the Russells was a medieval house. This was replaced by a brick mansion to an H-plan in the mid-seventeenth century. The Foleys, who bought the estate in 1655 massively expanded the house over the next 150 years. Thomas Foley (IV) may have used Henry Flitcroft to add Palladian service wings in the mid-eighteenth century. In the early nineteenth century, Thomas Foley (VII) used John Nash to design the enormous North and South porticos. The final transformation of the mansion was undertaken by Samuel Daukes for the Wards in the mid-nineteenth century. This saw the encasement of the mansion's central block and wings with Bath stone and the creation of lavish interiors in a revival French Renaissance style.

== Gardens and fountains ==
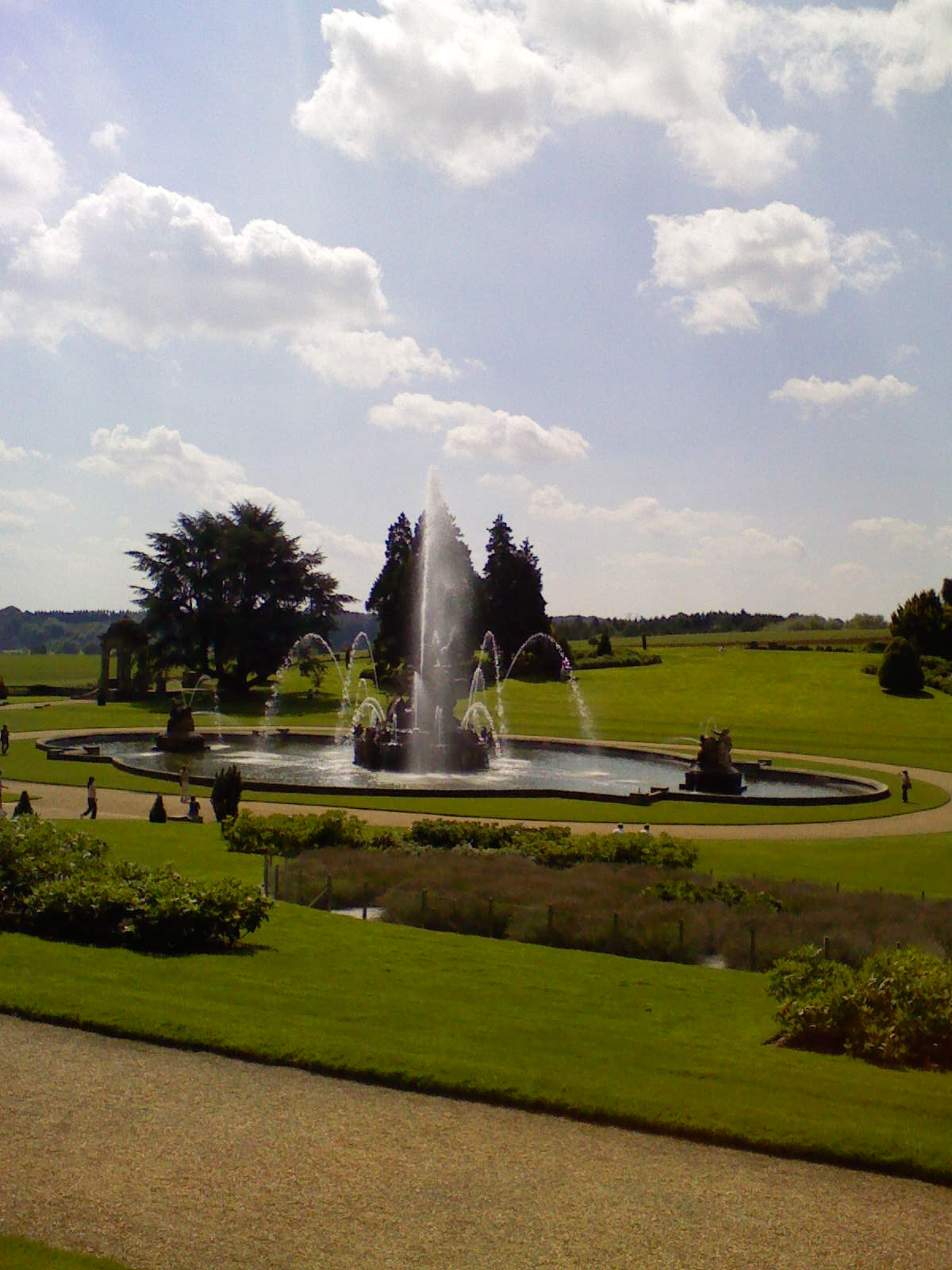
The Perseus and Andromeda fountain

The two immense fountains survived the fire and subsequent despoliation of the house. They were designed by Nesfield and executed by James Forsyth and William Forsyth, who were carrying out sculpture in the house and the church. The largest, the Perseus and Andromeda Fountain, has been restored to working order by English Heritage. For working times, see the Witley Court English Heritage website (link below). The remnants of Nesfield's parterres can also be seen. James Forsyth also made the large triumphal arch style drinking fountain in Dudley market place, adorned with sea horses and dolphins, presented in 1867 to the town by the Earl of Dudley.

In more recent times, the original plans and designs for the formal gardens have been discovered, and they are in the process of being restored. The main area of the gardens, the South Parterre, between the house and the Perseus and Andromeda fountain, has already been completed. Meanwhile, work on the East Parterre region is ongoing.

== Gallery ==
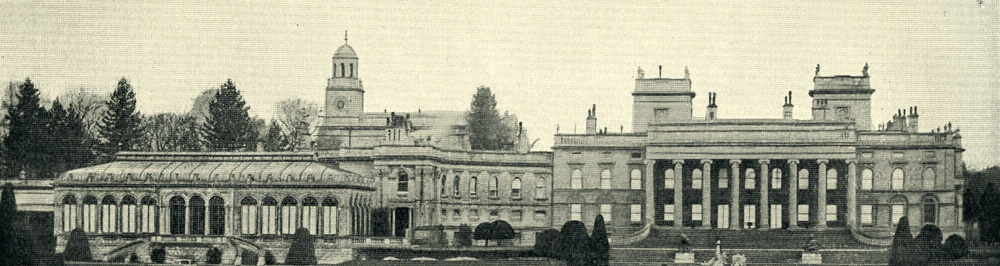
Witley Court circa 1900 before the fire.
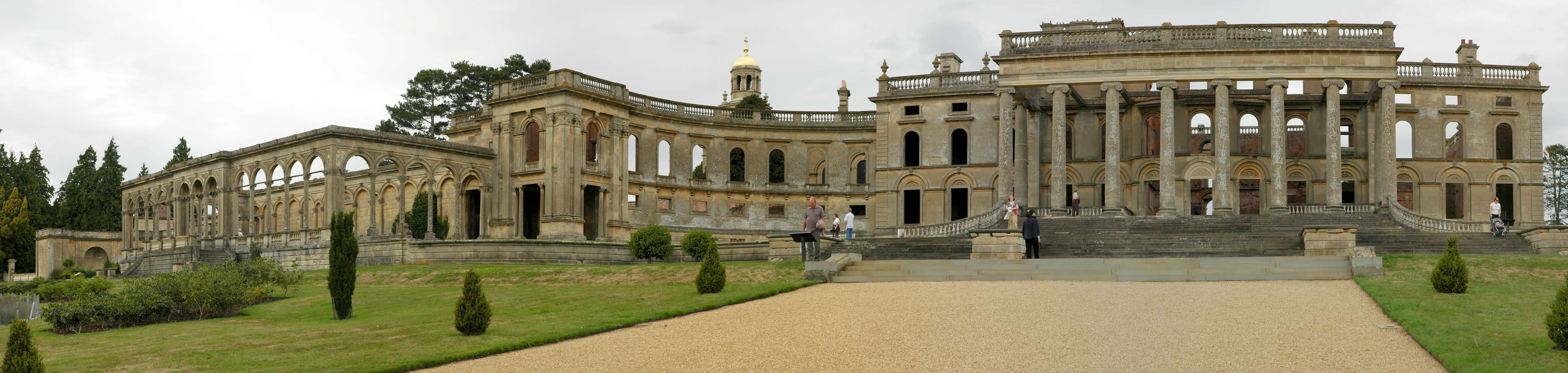
A panorama of Witley Court. The gold dome is that of the adjoining, and restored, church.
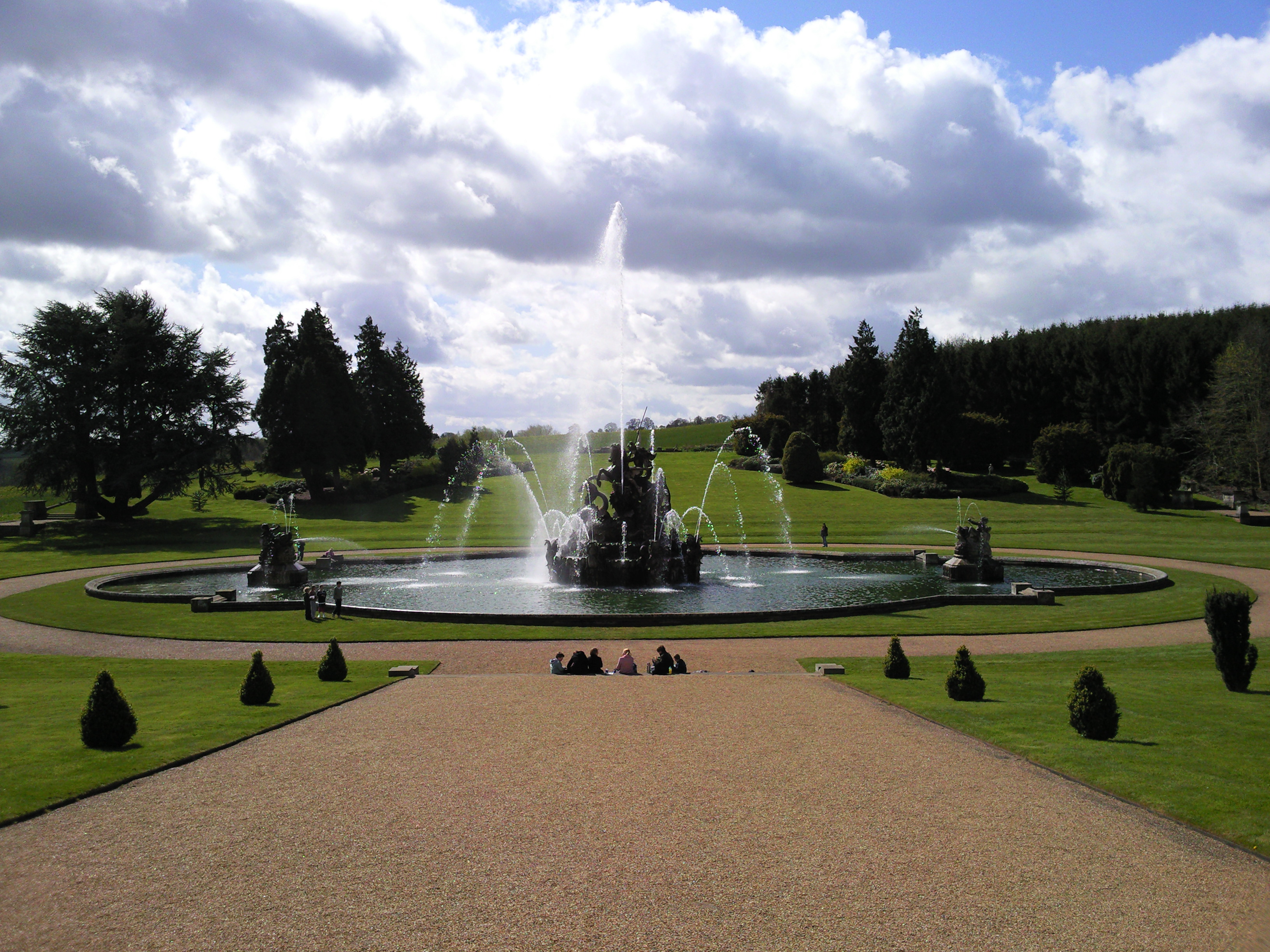
Full view of the now fully operational Perseus and Andromeda fountain

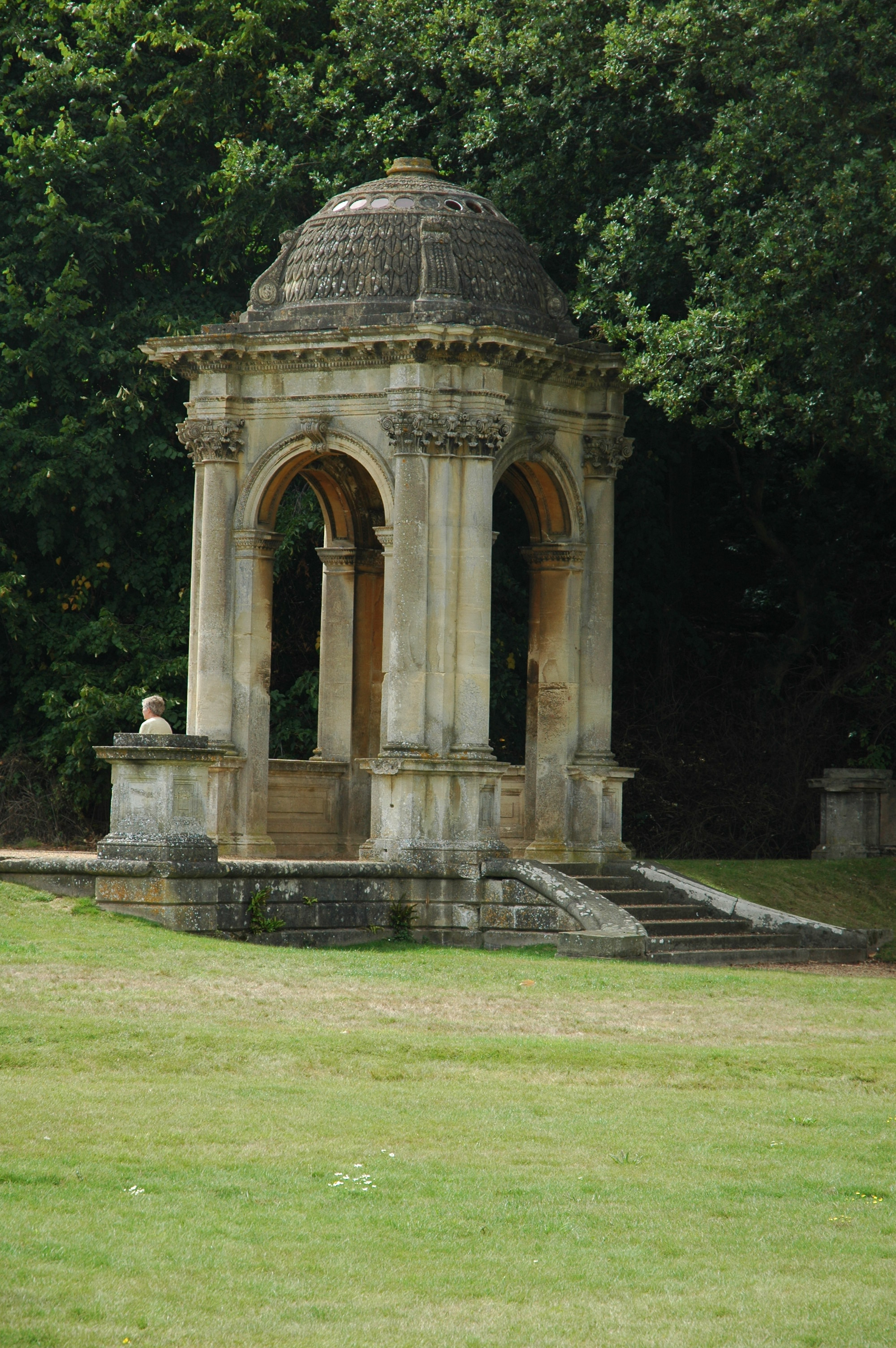
One of the two stone temples in the formal gardens

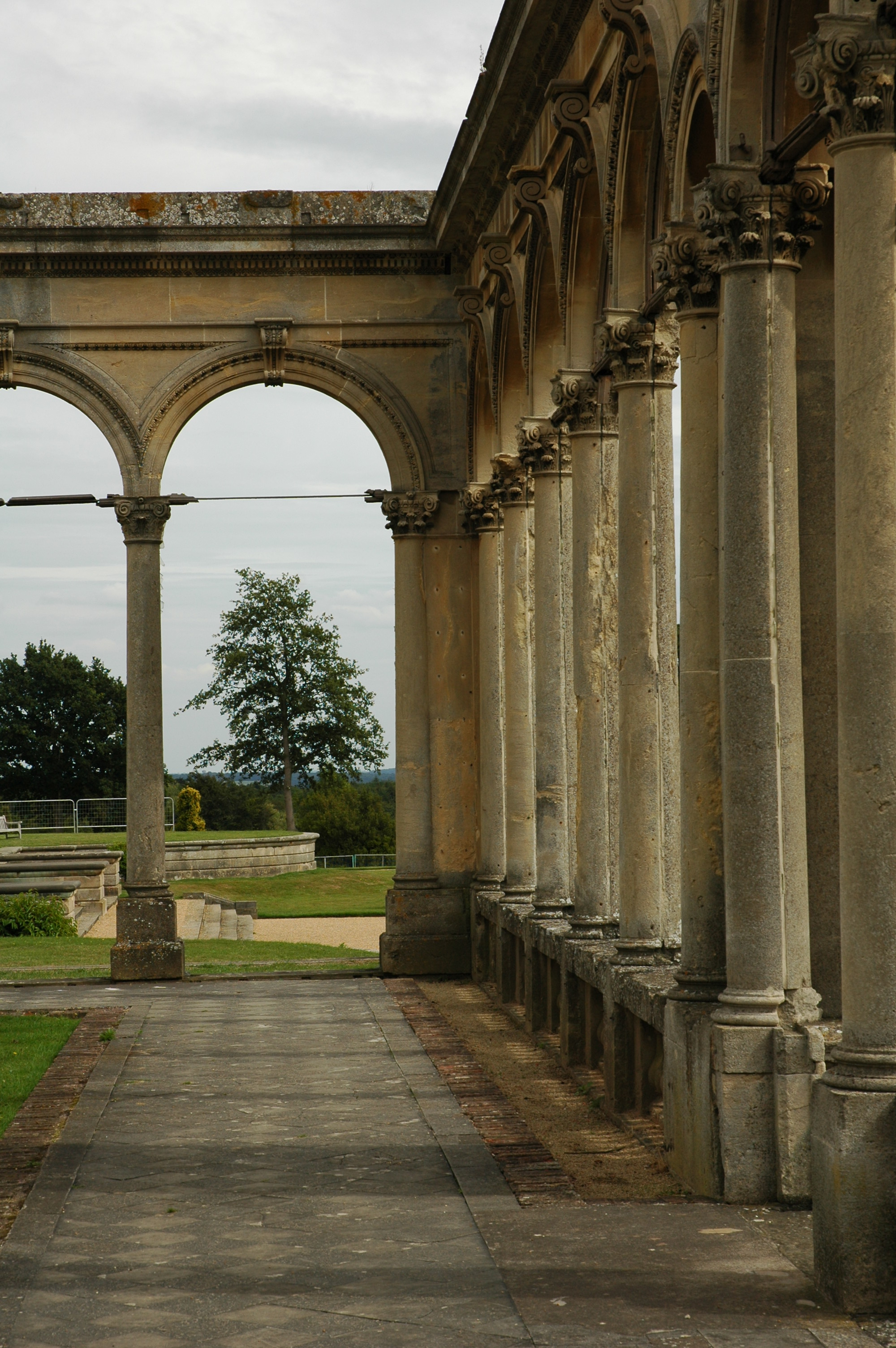
View from within the Orangery

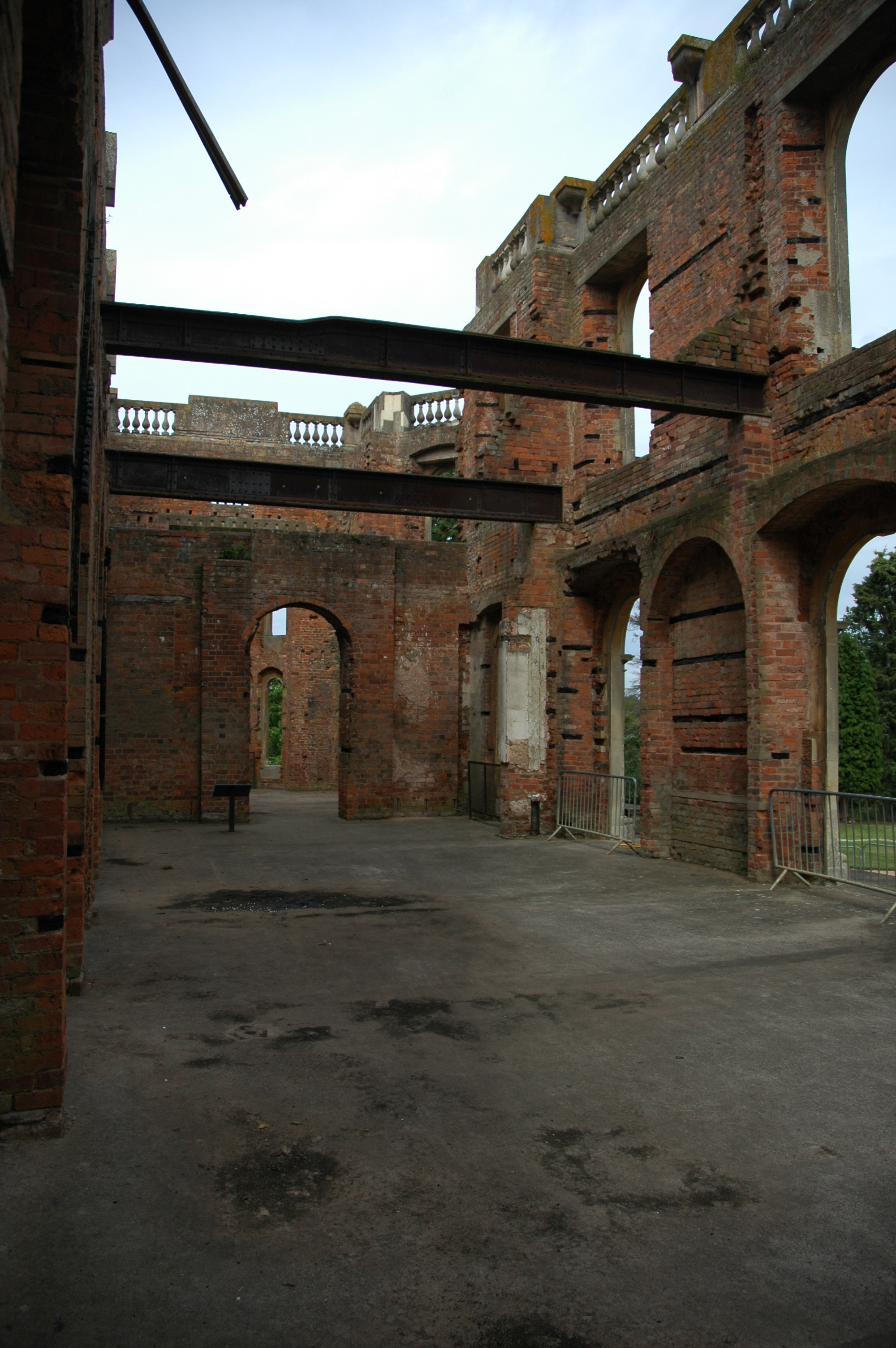
Inside the vast gutted ballroom

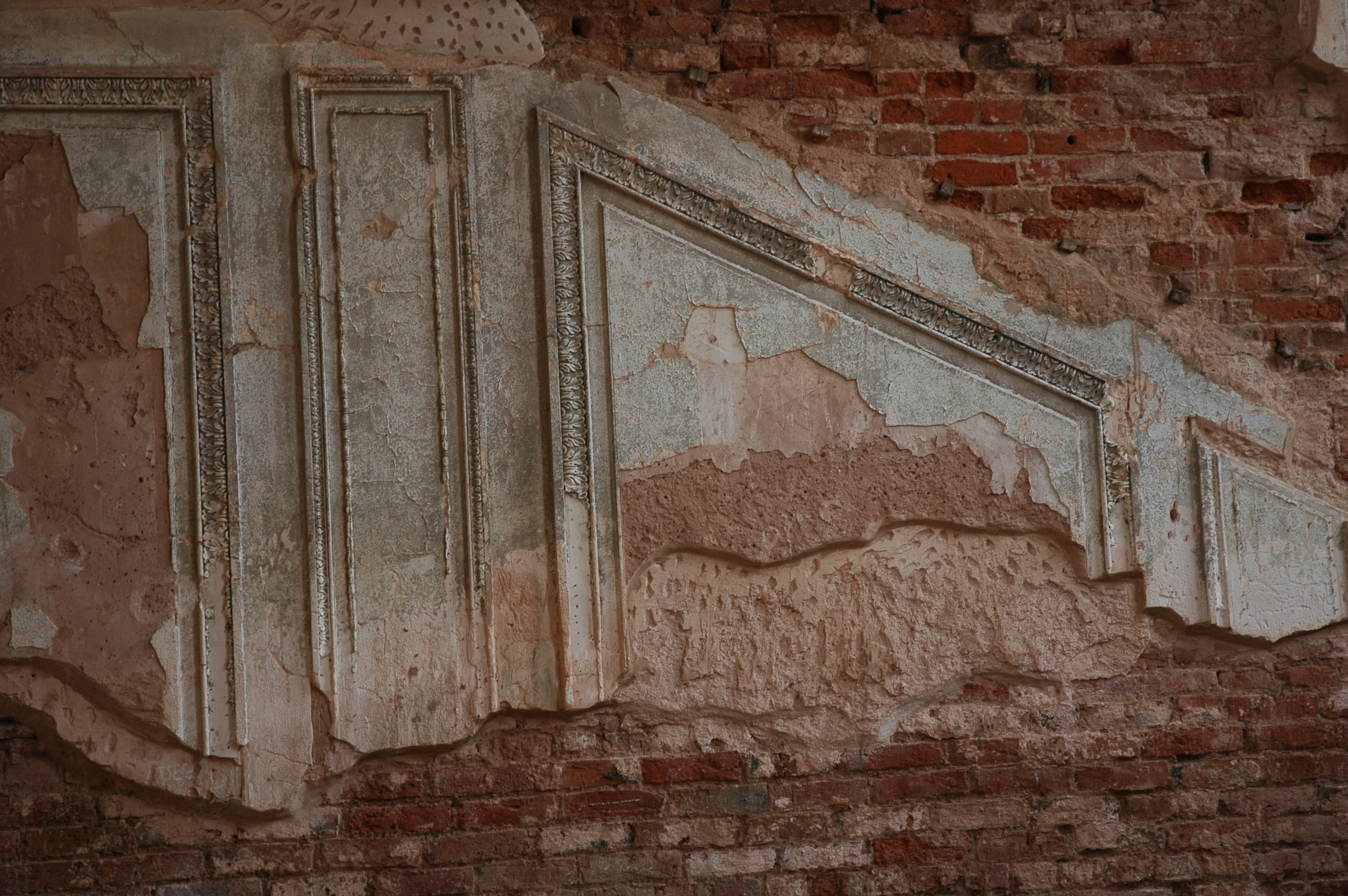
A scarce piece of surviving Carton Pierre plasterwork (a form of papier-mâché) in the Staircase Hall

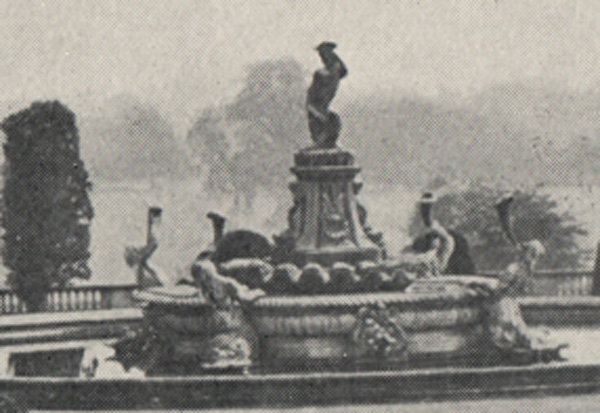
Close view of the Flora Fountain circa 1900 before it was damaged

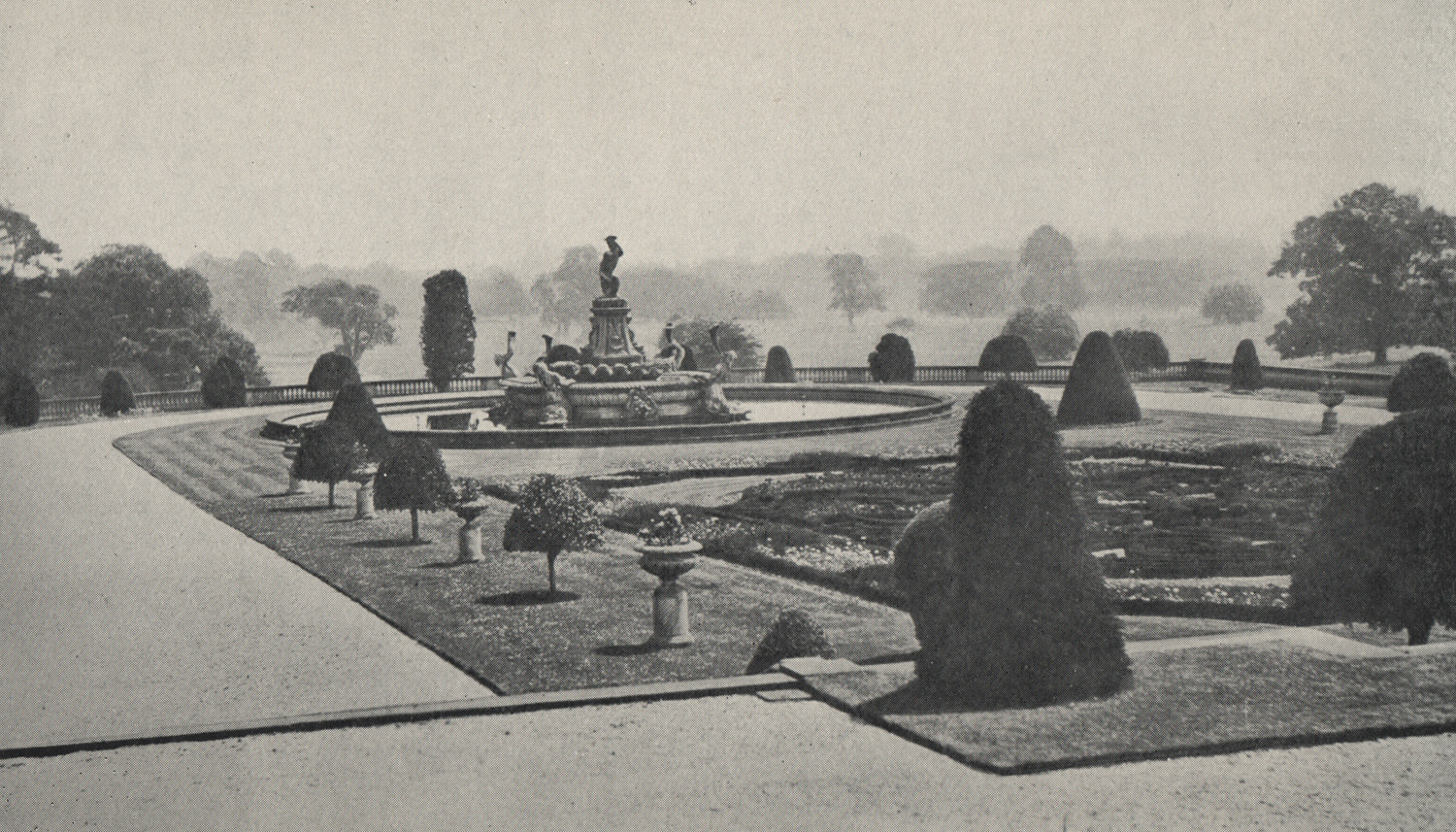
The East Parterre Garden circa 1900 showing the Flora Fountain undamaged

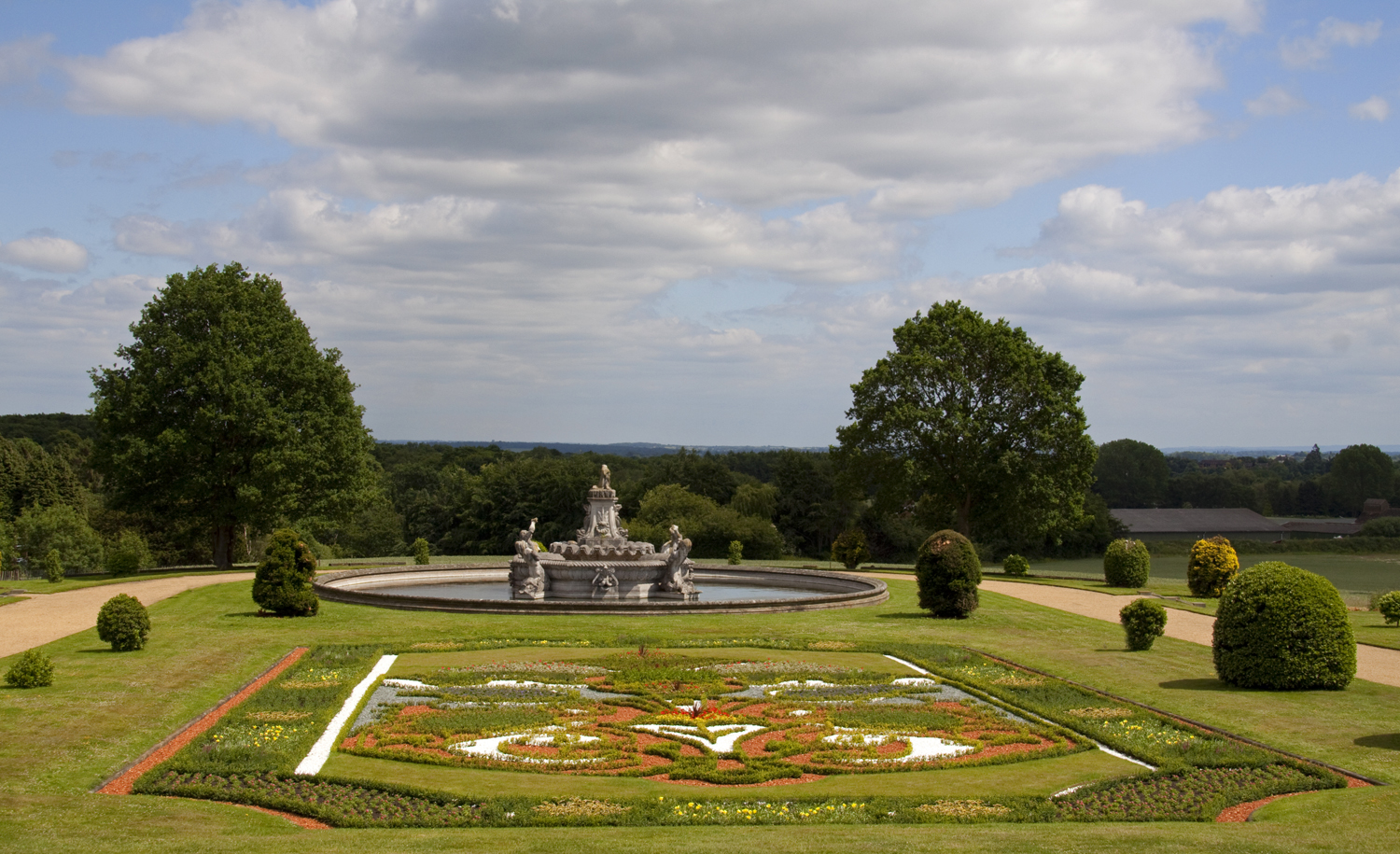
The East Parterre Garden today showing the damaged Flora Fountain.

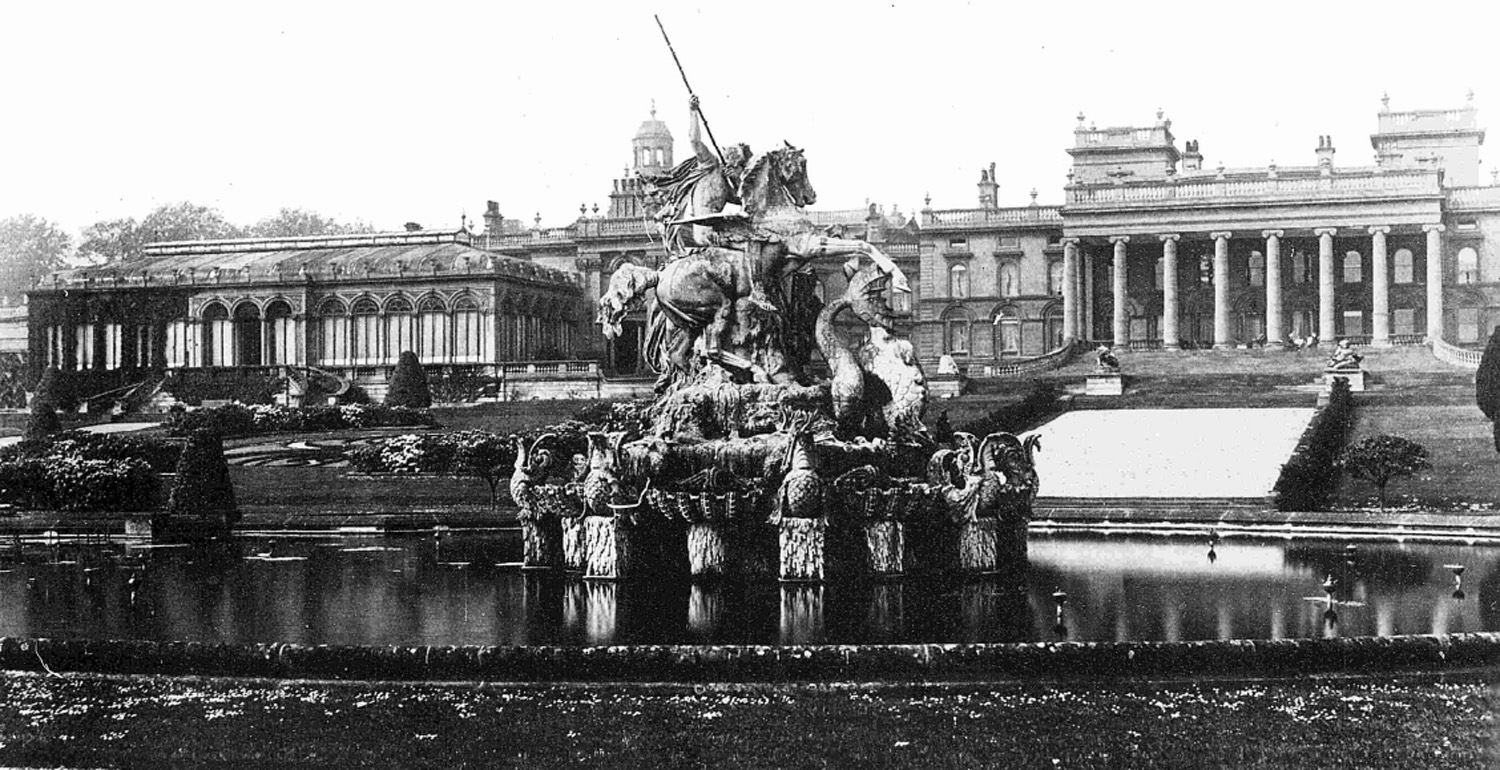
The Perseus and Andromeda fountain, at Witley Court in 1897 when Lady Rachel Dudley and the 2nd Earl of Dudley were in residence.

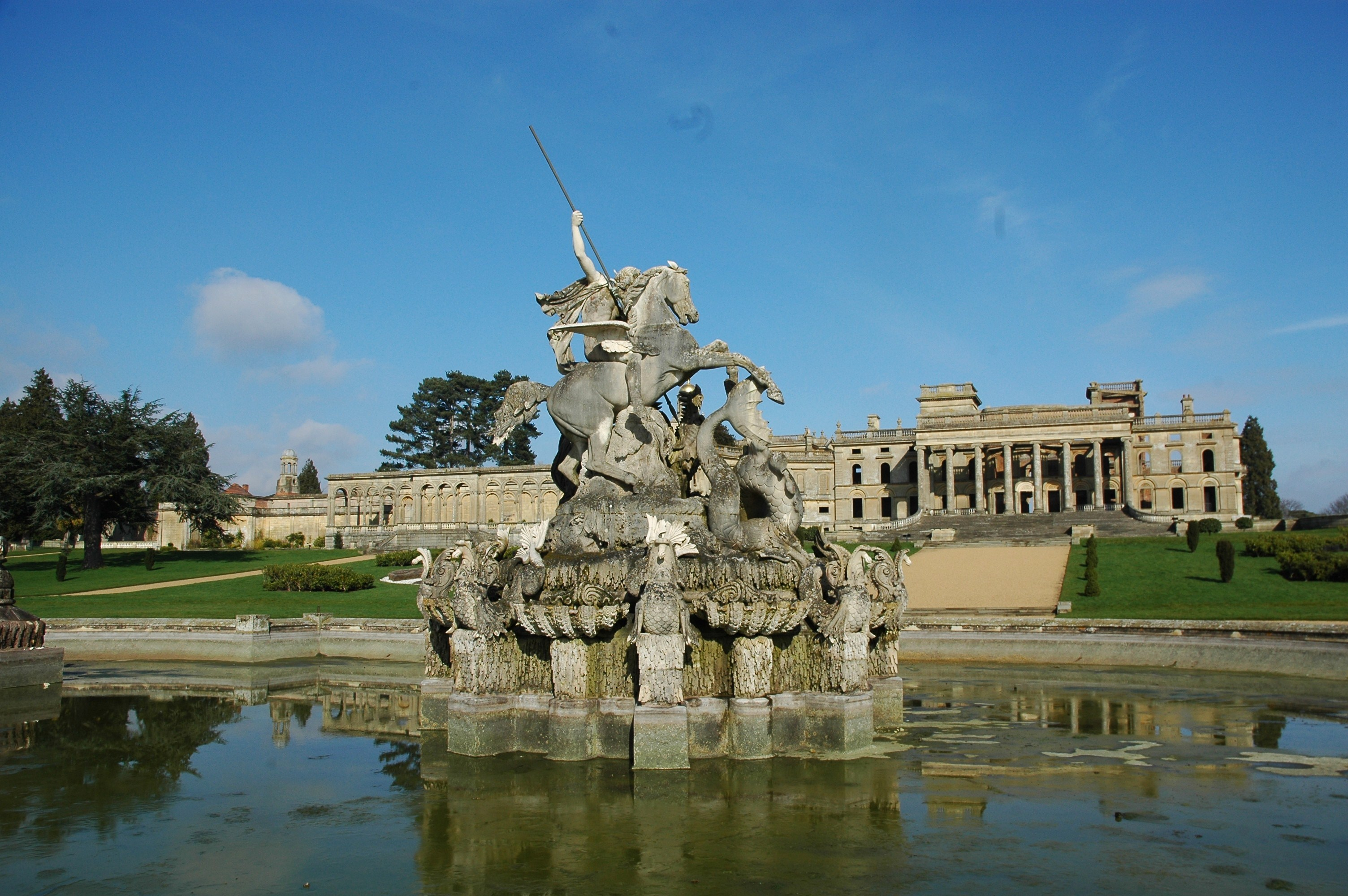
The Perseus and Andromeda fountain today looking very much as it did when Witley Court was a residence.

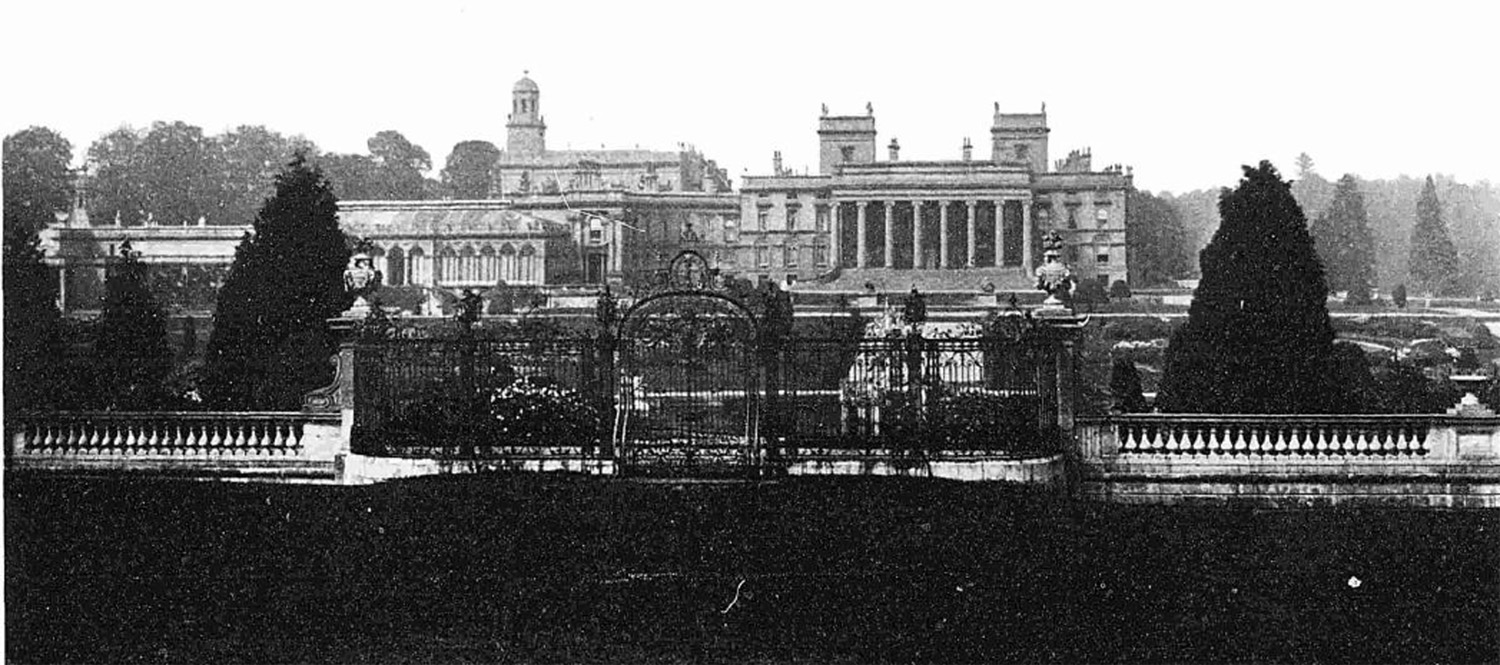
Witley Court 1897 showing the gates which formed the entrance to the South part of the garden.

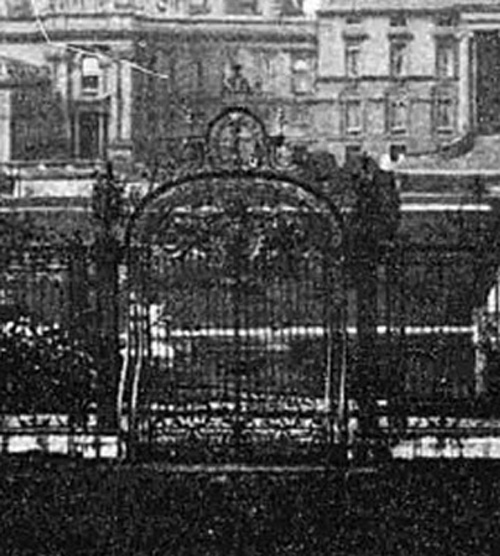
A closer view of the gates which were the entrance to the south garden

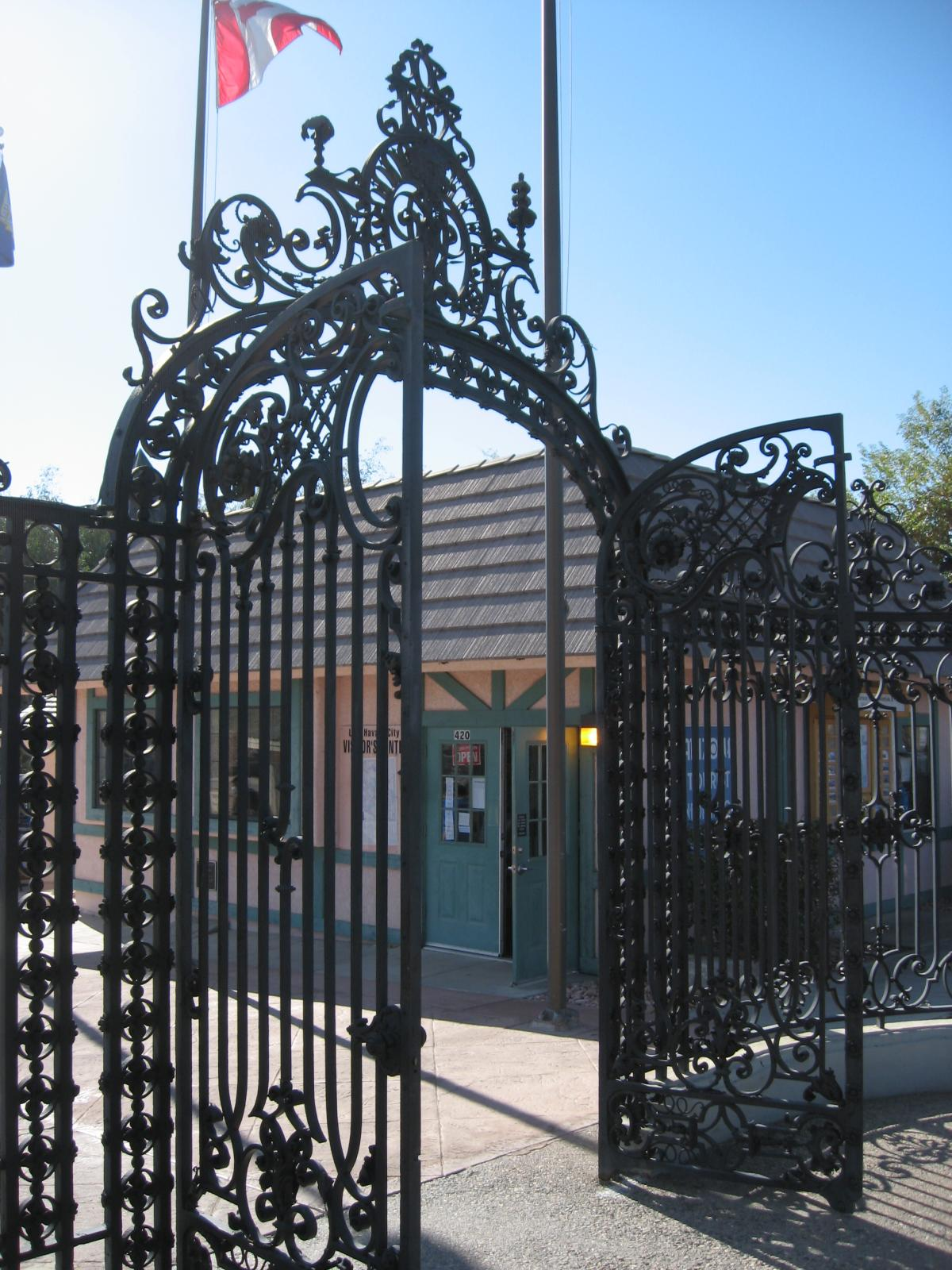
These gates still exist and are now the entrance to the London Bridge site in Lake Havasu City, Arizona in the USA

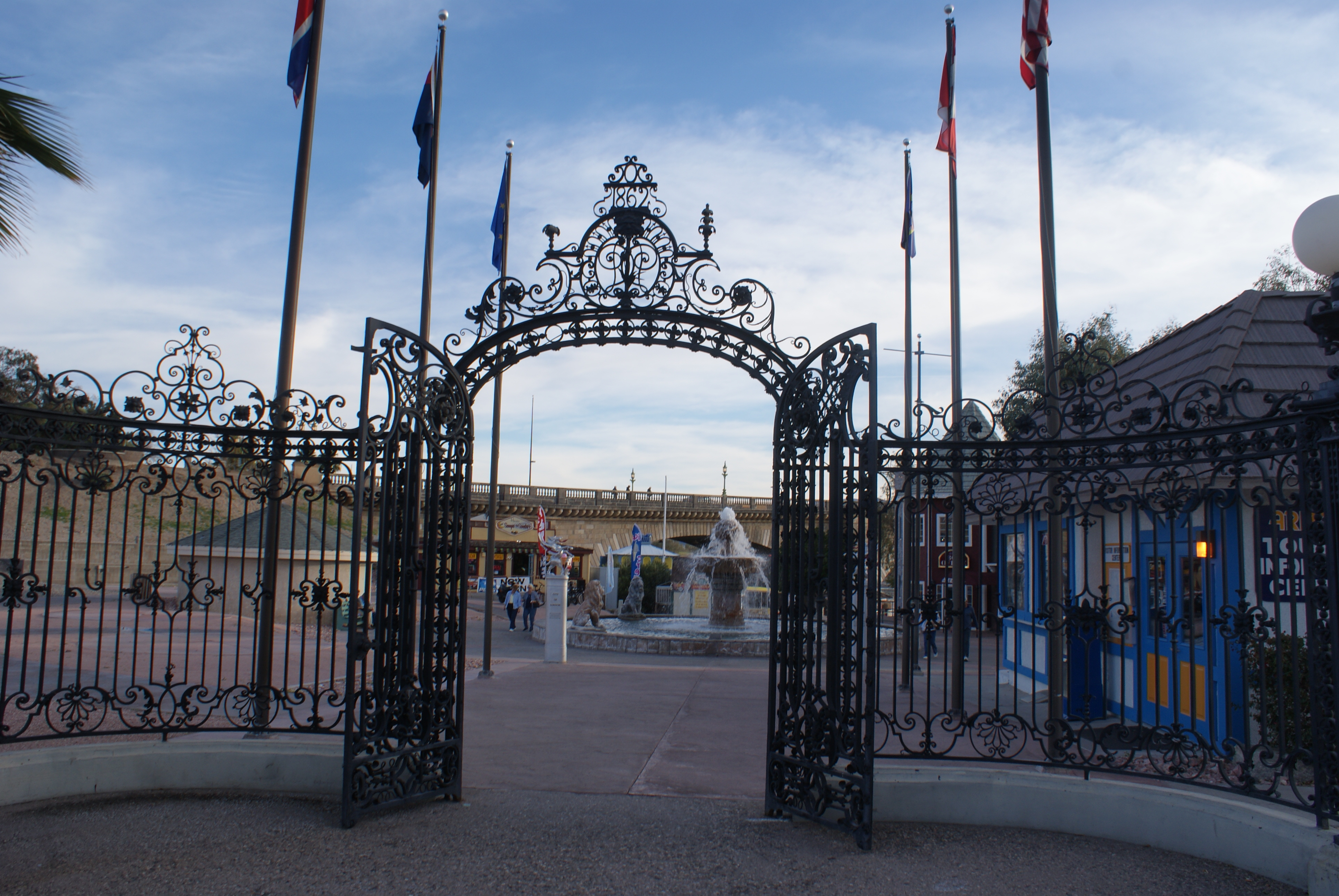
Another view of the gates in Lake Havasu City. At the top of the gates the date 1862 can be seen which is when Nesfield completed the Witley Court gardens.

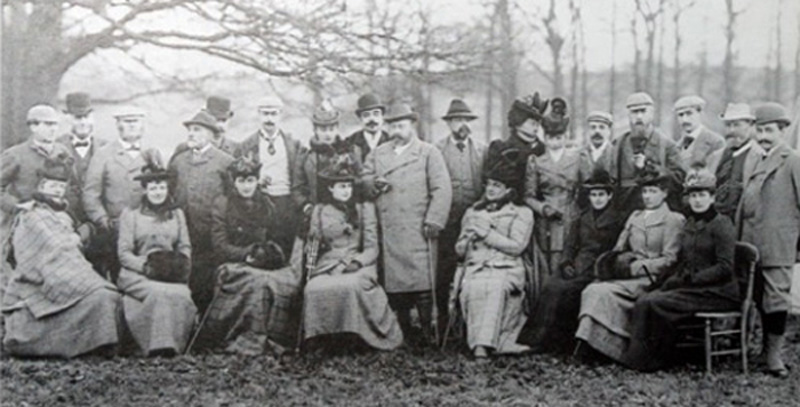
Shooting party at Witley Court in 1894. The Prince of Wales is in the centre of the photo. The couple to the left of him are the Countess of Dudley (with the fur collar) and the 2nd Earl of Dudley (with the white cap)

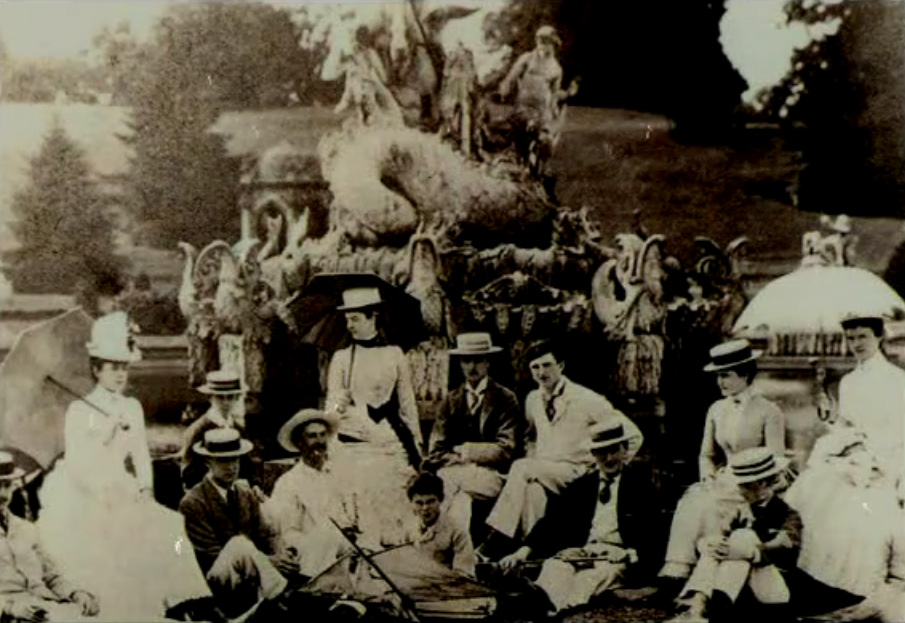
Garden Party in front of the Perseus and Andromeda fountain circa 1900. The Countess of Dudley is seated in the center; her daughter, Edith, is in the boat; her daughter, Lady Mackenzie is 2nd from right; Thomas Thynne, 5th Marquess of Bath is 5th from right, and next to him Violet Mordaunt (daughter of Harriet Mordaunt and later Marchioness of Bath).

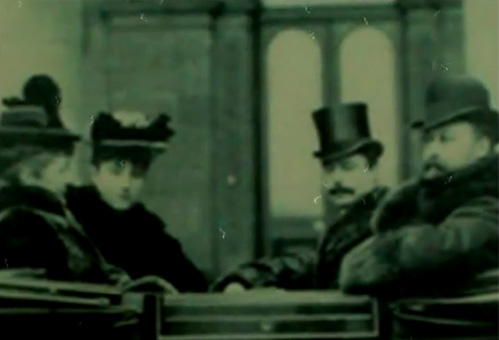
A carriage outside Witley Court circa 1900. The couple on the far side are the 2nd Earl of Dudley and his wife Rachel.

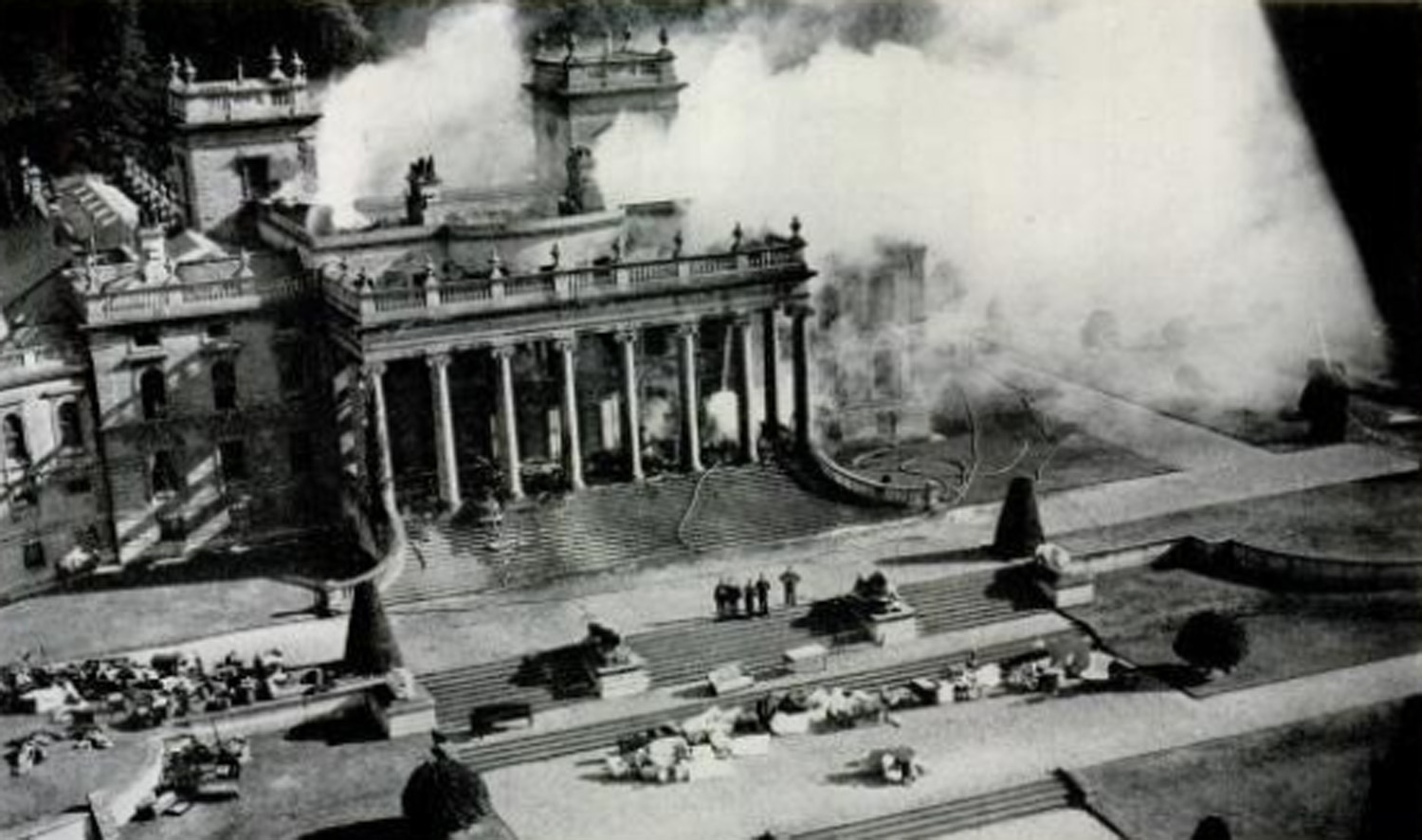
The fire at Witley Court in 1937. View from in front of the house

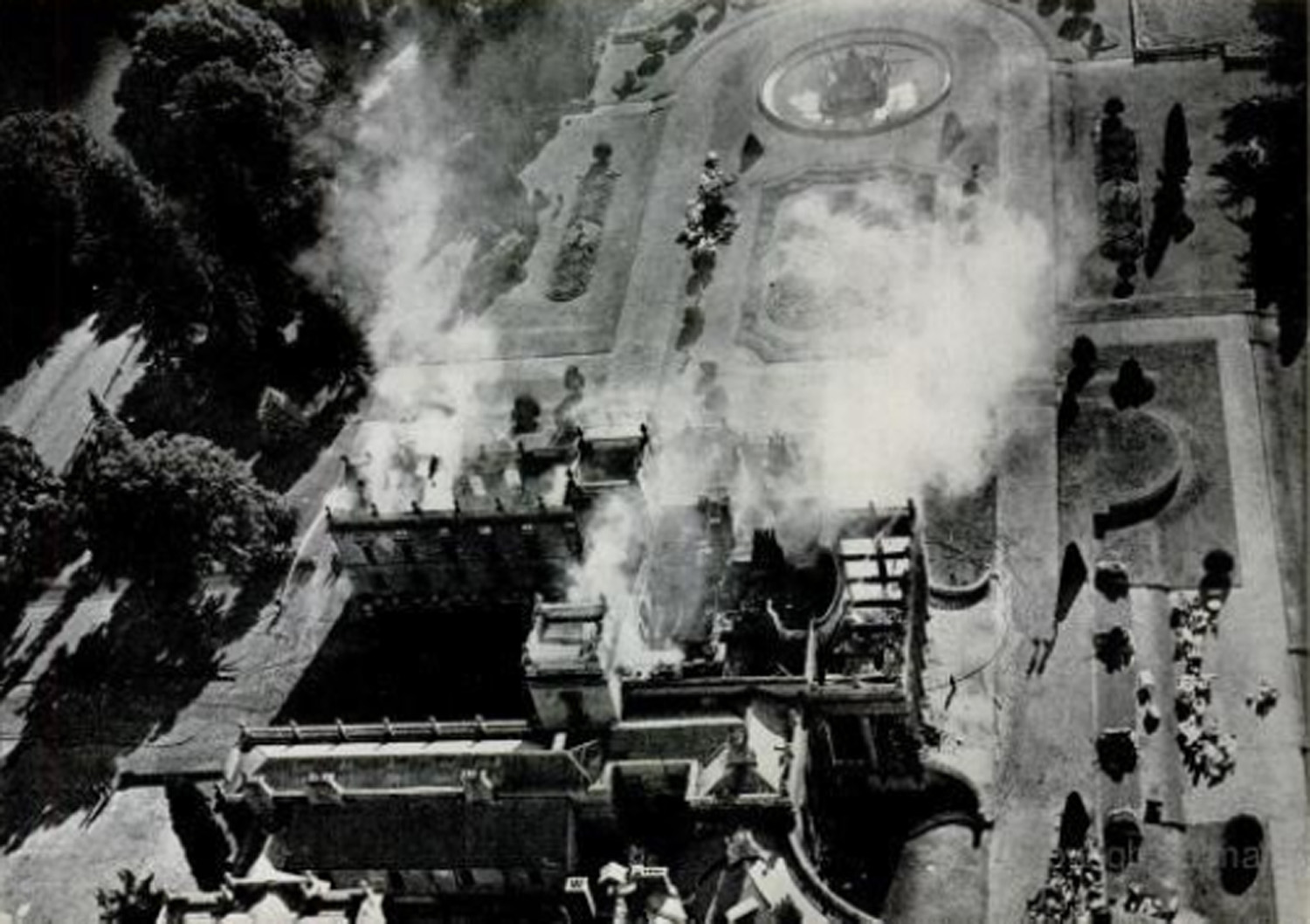
Witley Court fire in 1937. View from the side looking over the East Parterre Garden

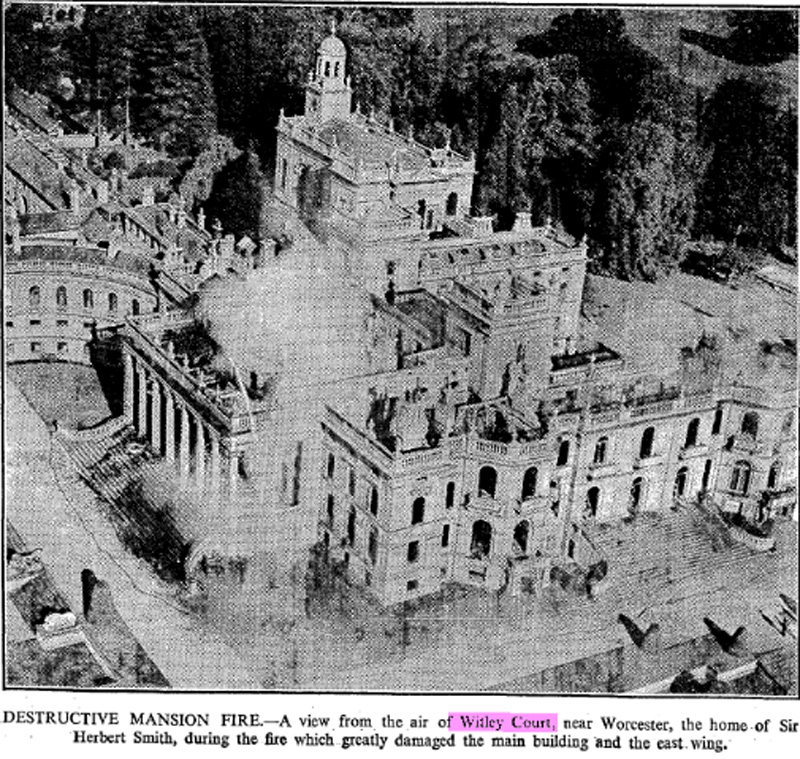
View of the Witley Court fire from above

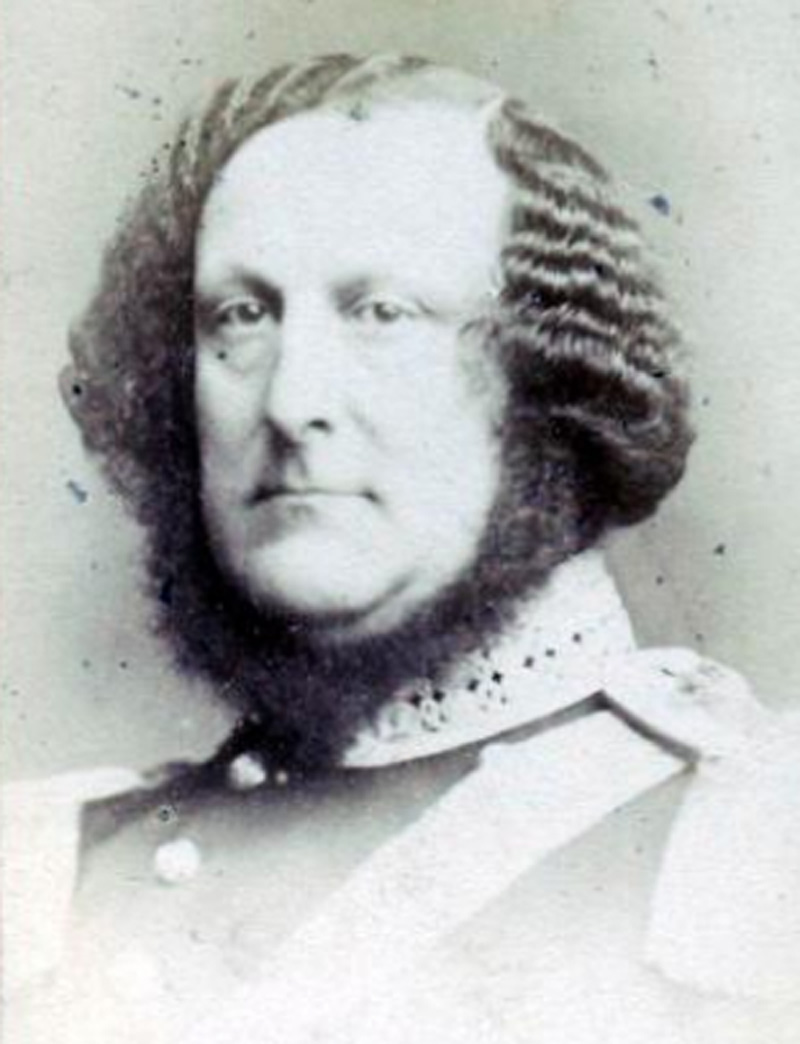
William Ward, 1st Earl of Dudley who bought Witley Court in 1837

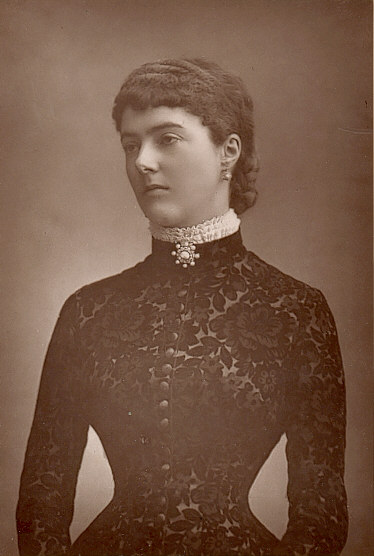
Georgina, Countess of Dudley, wife of the 1st Earl of Dudley.

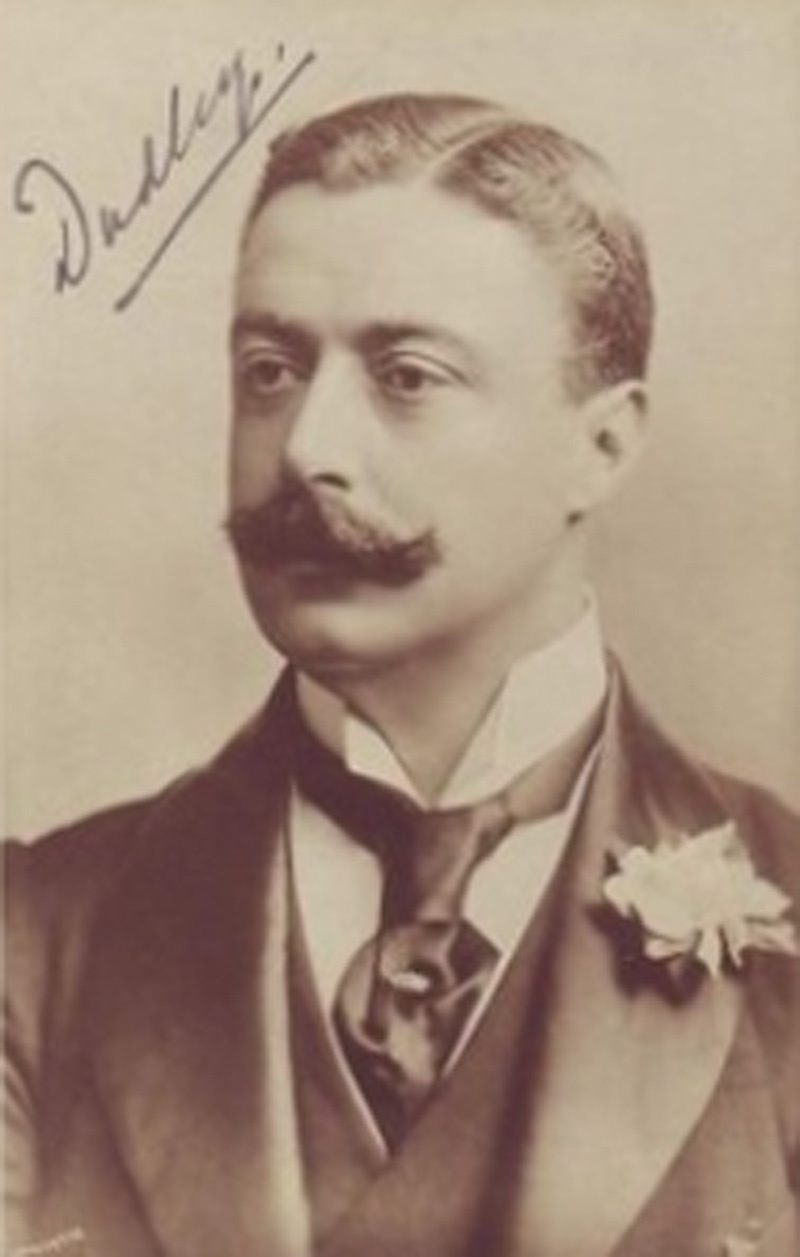
William Humble Ward, 2nd Earl of Dudley who inherited Witley Court when his father died in 1885

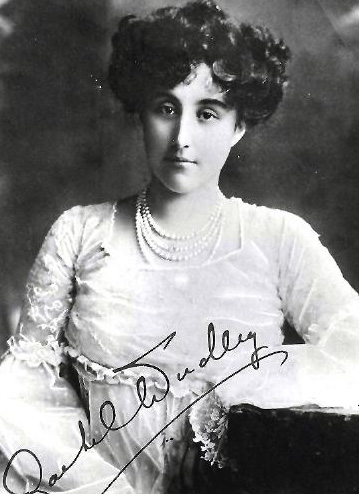
Rachel, Countess of Dudley, wife of the 2nd Earl of Dudley.
