= Baron Foley =

Barony in the Peerage of Great Britain

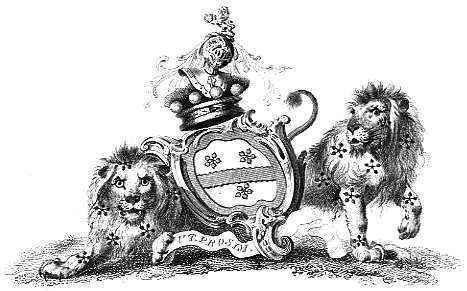
Arms of the Barons Foley

Baron Foley is a title that has been created twice in the Peerage of Great Britain, both times for members of the same family.

The first creation came in 1712 in favour of Thomas Foley, who had earlier represented Stafford in the House of Commons. He was the grandson of the prominent ironmaster Thomas Foley and the nephew of Paul Foley, Speaker of the House of Commons, and Philip Foley. However, this creation became extinct in 1766 on the death of his son, the second Baron.

The second creation came in 1776 when the barony was revived for Thomas Foley, the cousin, heir and namesake of the last holder of the 1712 creation, who was created Baron Foley, of Kidderminster in Worcestershire. He was a former Member of Parliament for Droitwich and Herefordshire. He was succeeded by his son, the second Baron. He also represented Droitwich and Herefordshire in Parliament and served as Postmaster General. On his death the title passed to his son, the third Baron. He notably held office as Captain of the Honourable Corps of Gentlemen-at-Arms (Government Chief Whip in the House of Lords) in the Whig administration of Lord Grey.

He was succeeded by his son, the fourth Baron. He was also a Whig politician and succeeded his father as Captain of the Honourable Corps of Gentlemen-at-Arms in 1833, a post he held until 1834, and again from 1835 to 1841, from 1846 to 1852, from 1852 to 1858, from 1859 to 1866 and from 1868 to 1869. On the death of his second son, the sixth Baron, in 1918, this line of the family failed. The late Baron was succeeded by his first cousin once removed, the seventh Baron. He was the grandson of General the Hon. Sir St George Gerald Foley, third son of the third Baron. As of 2012 the title is held by the seventh Baron's grandson, the ninth Baron. He succeeded his father, a composer and pianist who held the title for 83 years, in 2012.

The family seat was Witley Court until this was sold to trustees for William, Lord Ward (later the 1st Earl of Dudley), in 1837.

== Barons Foley, first creation (1712) ==
- Thomas Foley, 1st Baron Foley (1673–1733)
- Thomas Foley, 2nd Baron Foley (1703–1766)

== Barons Foley, second creation (1776) ==
- Thomas Foley, 1st Baron Foley (1716–1777)
- Thomas Foley, 2nd Baron Foley (1742–1793)
- Thomas Foley, 3rd Baron Foley (1780–1833)
- Thomas Henry Foley, 4th Baron Foley (1808–1869)
- Henry Thomas Foley, 5th Baron Foley (1850–1905)
- Fitzalan Charles John Foley, 6th Baron Foley (1852–1918)
- Gerald Henry Foley, 7th Baron Foley (1898–1927)
- Adrian Gerald Foley, 8th Baron Foley (1923–2012)
- Thomas Henry Foley, 9th Baron Foley (b. 1961)

The heir presumptive is the present holder's sixth cousin, Rupert Thomas Foley (b. 1970), great-great-great-great-grandson of Hon. Edward Foley, second son of the 1st Baron (see succession chart below).

The heir presumptive's heir is his son by his marriage to Rachel Staines (married 2013)

Line of succession
- Thomas Foley, 1st Baron Foley (1716–1777)
  - Thomas Foley, 2nd Baron Foley (1742–1793)
    - Thomas Foley, 3rd Baron Foley (1780–1833)
      - Sir St George Gerald Foley (1814–1897)
        - Henry St. George Foley (1866–1903)
          - Gerald Foley, 7th Baron Foley (1898–1927)
            - Adrian Foley, 8th Baron Foley (1923–2012)
              - Thomas Foley, 9th Baron Foley (born 1961)
  - Hon. Edward Foley (1747–1803)
    - John Hodgetts-Foley (1797–1861)
      - Henry Hodgetts-Foley (1828–1894)
        - Paul Henry Foley (1857–1928)
          - Henry Thomas Hamilton Foley (1905–1959)
            - Andrew Thomas Foley (1937–2007)
              - (1). Rupert Thomas Foley (born 1970)
                - (2). son Foley
              - (3). Ian Richard Foley (born 1973)
                - (4). William Allen Mills Foley (born 2006)
            - (5). Sir John Paul Foley (born 1939)

== Arms ==
Coat of arms of Baron Foley
Notes Arms, crest, and supporters as recorded in Burke's Peerage (1909). Crest A lion rampant argent holding between the forepaws an escutcheon charged with the arms. Escutcheon Argent, a fesse engrailed between three cinquefoils sable, all within a bordure sable. Supporters Two lions argent semée of cinquefoils sable. Motto Ut prosim

== See also ==
- Foley baronets

== Sources ==
- Hesilrige, Arthur G. M. (1921). Debrett's Peerage and Titles of courtesy. London: Dean & Son. p. 376.
- Kidd, Charles, Williamson, David (editors). Debrett's Peerage and Baronetage (1990 edition). New York: St Martin's Press, 1990,
- Leigh Rayment's Peerage Pages
