= Sir Edward Winnington, 2nd Baronet =

British baronet and politician

Sir Edward Winnington, 2nd Baronet (14 November 1749 – 9 January 1805), of Stanford Court, Stanford-on-Teme, Worcestershire, was a British baronet and politician.

He was the eldest son of Sir Edward Winnington, 1st Baronet. His father arranged for George Butt to be his tutor and he accompanied him when he started at Christ Church, Oxford.

Winnington married Anne, daughter of Thomas, 1st Lord Foley, by whom he had five sons, of whom the eldest, Thomas, succeeded him.

He was MP for Droitwich, Worcestershire between 1777 and 1805. He was elected a Fellow of the Royal Society in January 1805 but had died the day before.

Parliament of Great Britain
Preceded by Thomas Foley; Andrew Foley	Member of Parliament for Droitwich; 1777–1801; With: Andrew Foley	Succeeded by Parliament of the United Kingdom
Parliament of the United Kingdom
Preceded by Parliament of Great Britain	Member of Parliament for Droitwich; 1801–1805; With: Andrew Foley	Succeeded by Andrew Foley; Thomas Foley
Baronetage of Great Britain
Preceded by Edward Winnington	Baronet (of Stanford Court); 1791–1805	Succeeded by Thomas Edward Winnington
