= Andrew Foley (MP) =

British politician

Andrew Foley (c. 1748 – 28 July 1818) was a British Member of Parliament.

He was the third son of Thomas, 1st Lord Foley and educated in Oxford.

Unlike his two elder brothers, he did not greatly dissipate the family wealth. His father devised to him estates in and around Newent, Gloucestershire that had been in the family for several generations. He was a trustee of his father's will, together with his father's younger brother, the Very Reverend Robert Foley, Dean of Worcester.

Andrew Foley sat continuously as member of Parliament for Droitwich, long represented by members of his family, from 1774 until his death.

He died in 1818. He had married Elizabeth, daughter and heir of Boulter Tomlinson, and left two sons, Thomas and William Andrew (neither of whom married) and four daughters.

Parliament of Great Britain
Preceded by Robert Harley; Edward Foley	Member of Parliament for Droitwich; 1774–1801; With: Edward Foley 1774; Thomas Foley 1774–1777; Sir Edward Winnington, Bt 1777–1801	Succeeded by Parliament of the United Kingdom
Parliament of the United Kingdom
Preceded by Parliament of Great Britain	Member of Parliament for Droitwich; 1801–1818; With: Sir Edward Winnington, Bt 1801–1805; Thomas Foley 1805–1807; Sir Thomas Winnington, Bt 1807–1816; The Earl of Sefton 1816–1818	Succeeded by The Earl of Sefton; Thomas Foley
