= Thomas Foley (1778–1822) =

Thomas Foley (19 July 1778 – 11 January 1822) was the eldest son of Hon. Andrew Foley. He lived near Newent, Gloucestershire.

He represented Droitwich from 1805 to 1807; then Herefordshire in Parliament from 1807 until 1818; and then Droitwich again from 1819 until his death. He died unmarried.

Parliament of the United Kingdom
Preceded by Andrew Foley; Sir Edward Winnington, Bt	Member of Parliament for Droitwich; 1805–1807; With: Andrew Foley	Succeeded by Andrew Foley; Sir Thomas Winnington, Bt
Preceded by Sir George Cornewall, Bt; Sir John Cotterell, Bt	Member of Parliament for Herefordshire; 1807–1818; With: Sir John Cotterell, Bt	Succeeded by Sir John Cotterell, Bt; Sir Robert Price, Bt
Preceded by Andrew Foley; The Earl of Sefton	Member of Parliament for Droitwich; 1818–1822; With: The Earl of Sefton	Succeeded by The Earl of Sefton; John Hodgetts-Foley
