= Winnington baronets =

Title in the Baronetage of Great Britain

- Escutcheon of the Winnington baronets of Stanford Court
- Creation date: 1755
- Status: extant
- Seat: Stanford Court

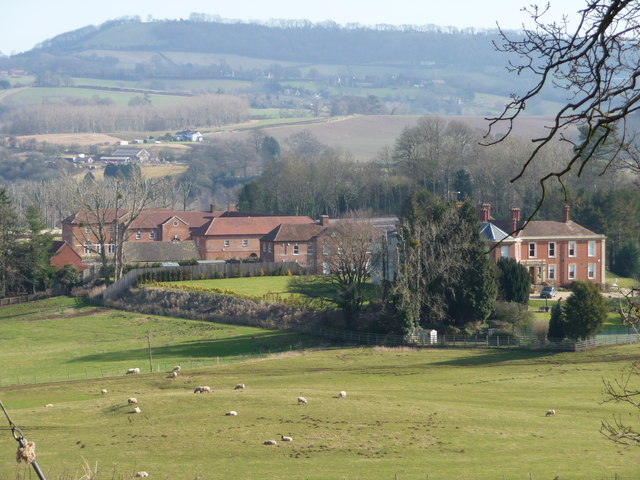
Stanford Court, Stanford on Teme, Worcestershire.

The Winnington baronetcy, of Stanford Court in the County of Worcester, is a title in the Baronetage of Great Britain.

== History ==
Sir Francis Winnington (1634–1700) Solicitor-General to King Charles II, acquired the family seat of Stanford Court, Stanford on Teme, Worcestershire through his marriage to Elizabeth, third and youngest sister and coheir of Edward Salwey.

The baronetage was created on 15 February 1755 for Edward Winnington (great-grandson of Sir Francis), subsequently Member of Parliament for Bewdley.

The 2nd Baronet represented Droitwich in the House of Commons and the 3rd Baronet Droitwich, Worcestershire and Bewdley. The 4th Baronet sat as Liberal Member of Parliament for Bewdley. The 5th Baronet was High Sheriff of Worcestershire in 1894.

The 7th Baronet was High Sheriff of Worcestershire in 2015.

== Winnington baronets, of Stanford Court (1755) ==
- Sir Edward Winnington, 1st Baronet (c. 1728–1791)
- Sir Edward Winnington, 2nd Baronet (1749–1805)
- Sir Thomas Edward Winnington, 3rd Baronet (c. 1780–1839)
- Sir Thomas Edward Winnington, 4th Baronet (1811–1872)
- Sir Francis Salwey Winnington, 5th Baronet (1849–1931)
- Sir Francis Salwey William Winnington, 6th Baronet (1907–2003)
- Sir Anthony Edward Winnington, 7th Baronet (born 1948)

The heir apparent is the present holder's son Edward Alan Winnington (born 1987).

== Extended family ==
Charles William Winnington-Ingram (1850–1923), grandson of the Reverend Edward Winnington-Ingram, second son of the 2nd Baronet, was a Rear-Admiral in the Royal Navy. His son Reginald Pepys Winnington-Ingram was Professor of Greek at King's College, London. Herbert Frederick Winnington-Ingram, youngest son of the aforementioned Reverend Edward Winnington-Ingram, second son of the 2nd Baronet, was also a Rear-Admiral in the Royal Navy.

Another grandson of the Reverend Edward Winnington-Ingram was Arthur Winnington-Ingram, Bishop of London from 1901 to 1939. His younger brother Edward and his nephew (Edward's son) Arthur were both priests who became Archdeacons of Hereford.

== Notes ==
Baronetage of Great Britain
Preceded by Lamb baronets	Winnington baronets of Stanford Court; 15 February 1755	Succeeded by Sheffield baronets
