= Thomas Foley, 4th Baron Foley =

British peer and Liberal politician

Thomas Henry Foley, 4th Baron Foley of Kidderminster DL (11 December 1808 – 20 November 1869), was a British peer and Liberal politician. He held office in every Whig/Liberal government between 1833 and 1869.

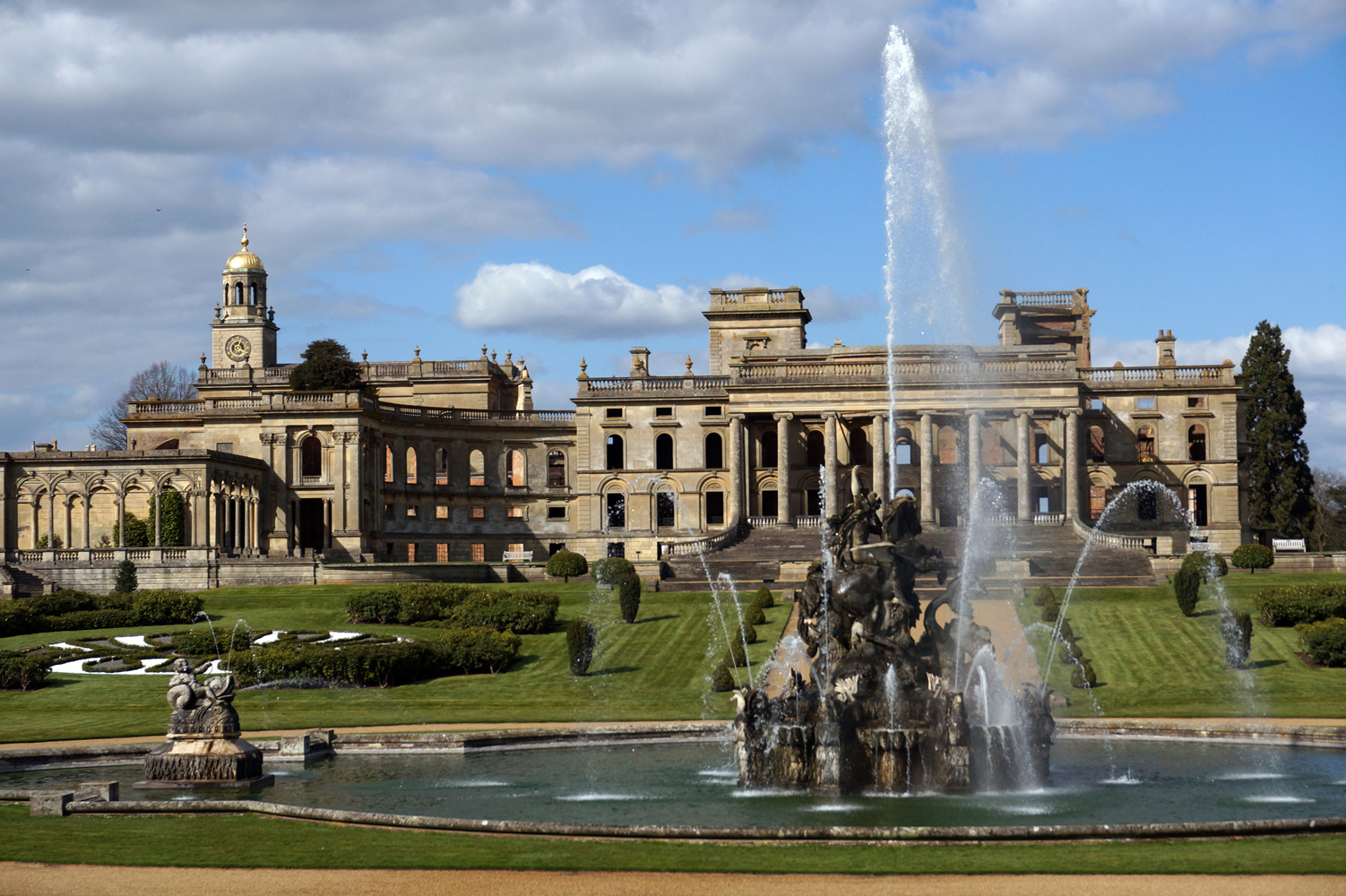
Witley Court

== Family and estate ==
Foley was the son of Thomas Foley, 3rd Baron Foley, and Lady Lucy Anne FitzGerald. James FitzGerald, 1st Duke of Leinster, and Emily FitzGerald, Duchess of Leinster, were his maternal great-grandparents.

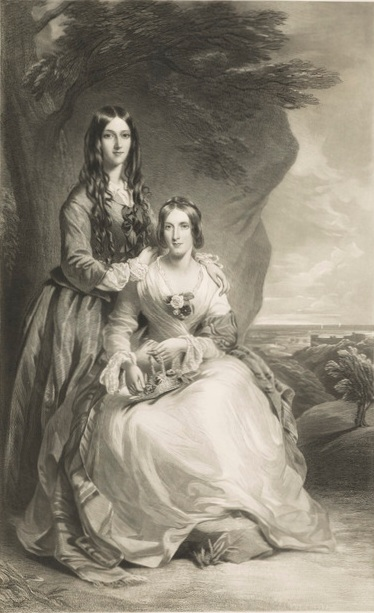
His wife, Lady Mary Charlotte Howard (left), with her sister, Lady Eliza

Lord Foley married Lady Mary Charlotte Howard, daughter of Henry Howard, 13th Duke of Norfolk, in 1849. He died in November 1869, aged 60, and was succeeded in the barony by his eldest son Henry Foley. Lady Foley died in 1897.

In 1837, he sold Witley Court and the heavily encumbered Great Witley estate to trustees of Lord Ward for £890,000. No longer having to pay interest on the debts charged on that estate, he was left considerably better off, as a result of the sale.

== Political career ==
He was elected to the House of Commons for Worcestershire in 1830, a seat he held until 1832, when he was returned for the newly created constituency of West Worcestershire. In April the following year he succeeded as fourth Baron Foley on the early death of his father and took his seat in the House of Lords. He also succeeded his father as Captain of the Honourable Corps of Gentlemen-at-Arms, despite being only 24 years of age.

He remained in this post until the government fell in 1834, and held the same office under Lord Melbourne from 1835 to 1841, under Lord John Russell from 1846 to 1852 and 1865 to 1866, under Lord Aberdeen from 1852 to 1855, under Lord Palmerston from 1859 to 1865 and under William Ewart Gladstone from 1868 to 1869. However, Lord Foley was never a member of the cabinet. Apart from his political career he was also Lord Lieutenant of Worcestershire between 1837 and 1839.

Parliament of the United Kingdom
Preceded by Henry Lygon; Sir Thomas Edward Winnington	Member of Parliament for Worcestershire; 1830–1832; With: Henry Lygon 1830–1831; Frederick Spencer 1831–1832	Constituency abolished
New constituency	Member of Parliament for West Worcestershire; 1832–1833; With: Henry Lygon	Succeeded by Henry Lygon; Henry Jeffreys Winnington
Political offices
Preceded by The 3rd Lord Foley	Captain of the Honourable Corps of Gentlemen-at-Arms; 1833–1834	Succeeded by The Viscount Hereford
Preceded by The Viscount Hereford	Captain of the Honourable Corps of Gentlemen-at-Arms; 1835–1841	Succeeded by The Lord Forester
Preceded by The Lord Forester	Captain of the Honourable Corps of Gentlemen-at-Arms; 1846–1852	Succeeded by The Earl of Sandwich
Preceded by The Earl of Sandwich	Captain of the Honourable Corps of Gentlemen-at-Arms; 1852–1858	Succeeded by The Earl Talbot
Preceded by The Earl Talbot	Captain of the Honourable Corps of Gentlemen-at-Arms; 1859–1866	Succeeded by The Lord Ossulston
Preceded by The Marquess of Exeter	Captain of the Honourable Corps of Gentlemen-at-Arms; 1868–1869	Succeeded by The Marquess of Normanby
Honorary titles
Preceded by The Lord Lyttelton	Lord Lieutenant of Worcestershire; 1837–1839	Succeeded by The Lord Lyttelton
Peerage of Great Britain
Preceded by Thomas Foley	Baron Foley; 2nd creation 1833–1869	Succeeded by Henry Thomas Foley
