= Francis Winnington (Droitwich MP) =

English politician and barrister

Francis Winnington (1704 – c.1754) of Broadway was an English politician and barrister.

Francis was the son of Francis Winnington of Broadway, the second son of Sir Francis Winnington. He matriculated at Trinity College, Oxford on 29 March 1721, at the age of 17, and was called to the bar at the Middle Temple on 9 February 1728. From 1733 to 1747, he was Solicitor to the Admiralty, before resigning the post to enter Parliament.

He sat as MP for Droitwich from 1747 to 1754. His marriage to Susannah Courtney or Courtenay left no children. His brother was Edward Winnington and his nephew Sir Edward Winnington, 1st Baronet.

Parliament of Great Britain
| Preceded by Thomas Foley; Lord George Bentinck | Member of Parliament for Droitwich; 1747–1754; With: Thomas Foley 1747; Edwin Sandys 1747–1754 | Succeeded by Thomas Foley; Robert Harley |
