= Sir Edward Winnington, 1st Baronet =

Sir Edward Winnington, 1st Baronet (c. 1728 – 9 December 1791) was the son of Edward Winnington of Broadway, son of Francis Winnington of Broadway, son of Sir Francis Winnington and younger brother of Francis Winnington.

Upon the death of Rt Hon. Thomas Winnington in 1746, the Stanford Court estate was left to Edward Winnington of Broadway, and then passed to this Edward. He was created a baronet in 1755 and sat as MP for Bewdley from 1761 to 1774, where he built Winterdyne House. He died in 1791 and was succeeded by his only son Sir Edward Winnington, 2nd Baronet.

Parliament of Great Britain
| Preceded by William Finch | Member of Parliament for Bewdley; 1761–1774 | Succeeded by Thomas Lyttelton |
Baronetage of Great Britain
| New creation | Baronet (of Stanford Court); 1755–1791 | Succeeded by Edward Winnington |
