= Robert Harley (c. 1706 – 1774) =

British Member of Parliament

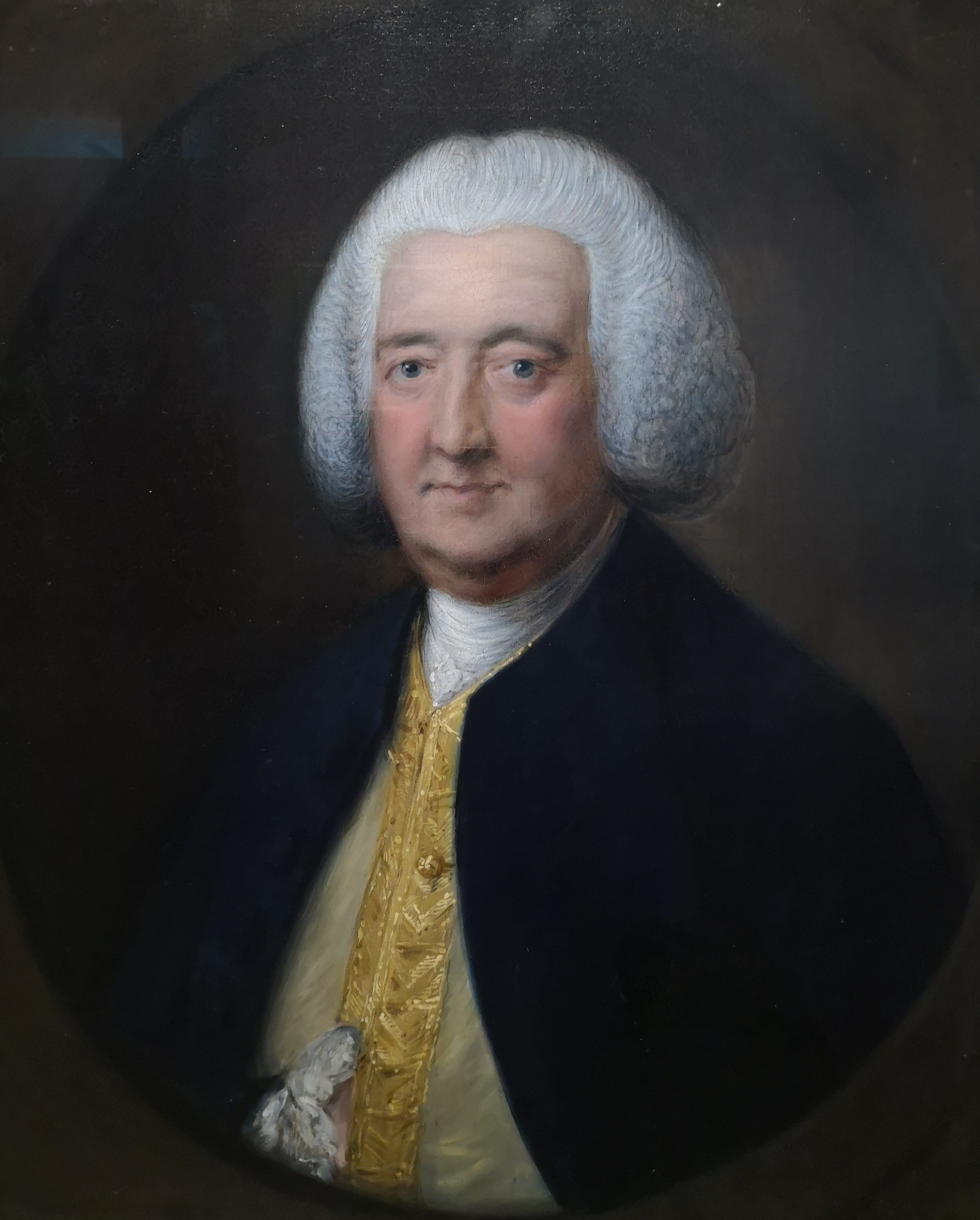
Robert Harley around 1770 by Thomas Gainsborough

Robert Harley (c. 1706 – 15 March 1774) was a British Member of Parliament.

== Early life and education ==
He was born a younger son of Edward Harley (1664–1735) and his wife Sarah, daughter of Thomas Foley. His elder brother was Edward Harley, 3rd Earl of Oxford.

He was educated at Westminster School (c. 1715–1719) and at Christ Church, Oxford. he studied law at Lincoln's Inn from 1724 and was called to the bar in 1730.

== Career ==
He was Recorder of Leominster from 1732 to his death and of Tewkesbury from 1756 to 1760 and from 1764 to his death.

He served as Member of Parliament for Leominster on two occasions (1734–1741 and 1742–1747) and for Droitwich from 1754 to his death.

Parliament of Great Britain
Preceded by Viscount Bateman; Sir George Caswall	Member of Parliament for Leominster; 1734–1741; With: Sir George Caswall	Succeeded by John Caswall; Capel Hanbury
Preceded by John Caswall; Capel Hanbury	Member of Parliament for Leominster; 1742–1747; With: Capel Hanbury	Succeeded by Sir Robert de Cornwall; James Peachey
Preceded by Edwin Sandys, 2nd Baron Sandys; Francis Winnington	Member of Parliament for Droitwich; 1754–1774; With: Thomas Foley, later Lord Foley (1754-68); Edward Foley (1768-74)	Succeeded by Edward Foley; Andrew Foley
