= Thomas Foley, 3rd Baron Foley =

British peer and Whig politician (1780–1833)

The Right Honourable The Lord Foley PC DL
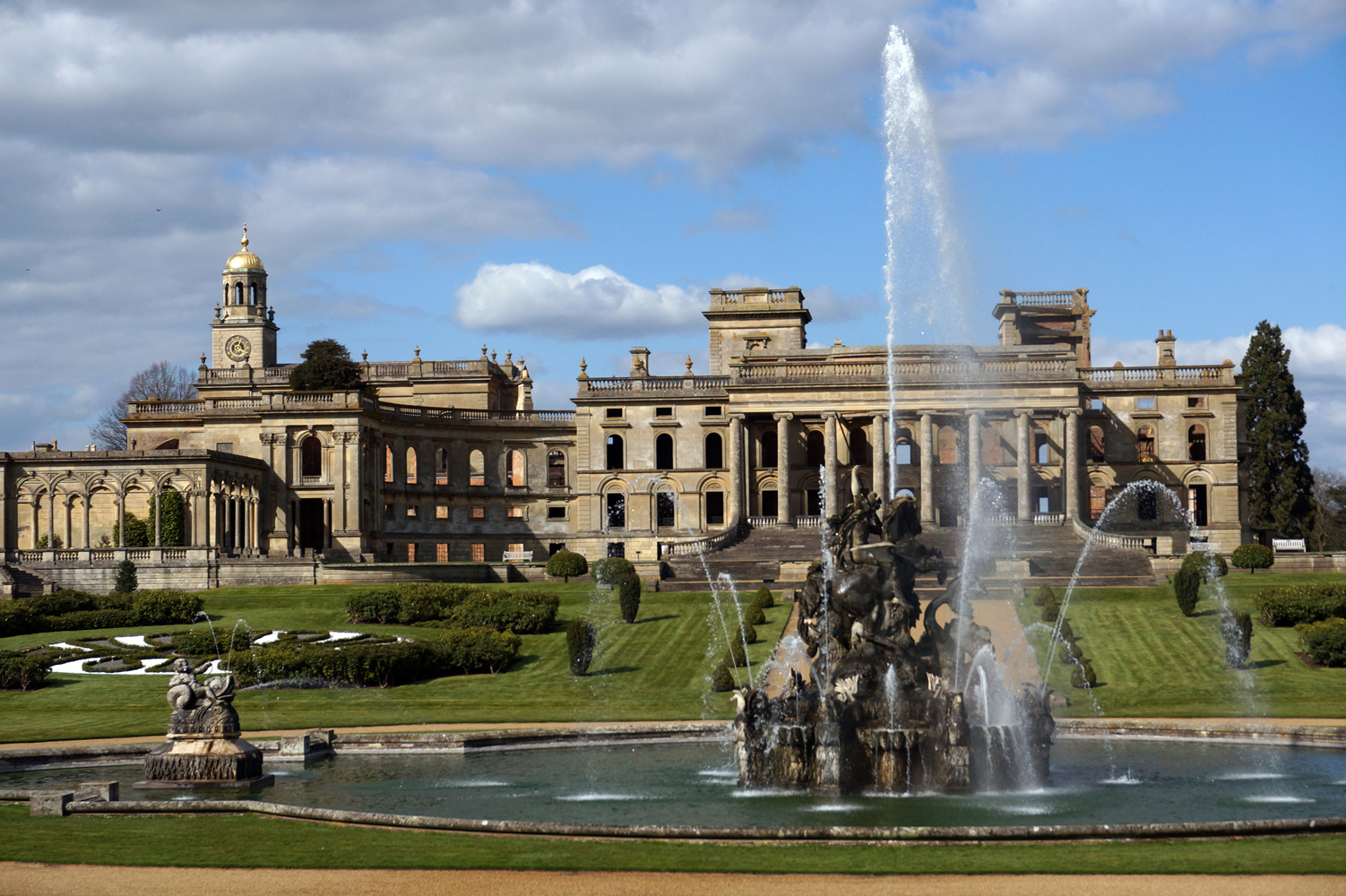
- Whitley Court – the Foley family seat

Captain of the Honourable Corps of Gentlemen Pensioners
- In office 8 December 1830 – 16 April 1833
- Monarch: William IV
- Prime Minister: The Earl Grey
- Preceded by: The Viscount Hereford
- Succeeded by: The Lord Foley

Personal details
- Born: 22 December 1780
- Died: 16 April 1833 (aged 52) London, England
- Party: Whig
- Spouse: Lady Cecilia Olivia Geraldine FitzGerald (m. 1806)
- Children: 8
- Parent(s): Thomas Foley, 2nd Baron Foley; Henrietta Stanhope

Thomas Foley, 3rd Baron Foley PC, DL (22 December 1780 – 16 April 1833), was a British peer and Whig politician. He served as Captain of the Honourable Corps of Gentlemen Pensioners under Lord Grey between 1830 and 1833.

== Background ==
Foley was the son of Thomas Foley, 2nd Baron Foley, and Henrietta Stanhope.

== Political career ==
Foley succeeded as third Baron Foley on the death of his father in 1793 and was able to take his seat in the House of Lords on his 21st birthday in 1801. When the Whigs came to power under Lord Grey in 1830, Foley was appointed Captain of the Honourable Corps of Gentlemen Pensioners, a post he held until his early death in 1833. In 1830 he was admitted to the Privy Council. Apart from his political career he was also Lieutenant-Colonel Commandant of the West Worcester Local Militia from 24 September 1808, Lord Lieutenant of Worcestershire between 1831 and 1833 and Master of the Quorn Hunt from 1805 to 1806.

== Family ==
Lord Foley married Lady Cecilia Olivia Geraldine FitzGerald (3 March 1786 – London, 27 July 1863), daughter of William FitzGerald, 2nd Duke of Leinster, in Boyle Farm, Kingston upon Thames, on 18 August 1806. They had four sons, and four daughters:

- Thomas Henry Foley, 4th Baron Foley of Kidderminster (11 Dec 1808 - 20 Nov 1869)
- Colonel Augustus Frederick (9 Dec 1810 - 9 Oct 1881) was an officer in the Grenadier Guards. Died unmarried.
- Gen. Sir St. George Gerald (10 July 1814 - 24 Jan 1897) married Augusta Selina Sturt, daughter of Henry Sturt.
- Adm. FitzGerald Algernon Charles (5 Sep 1823 - 26 July 1903) was married twice. Firstly to Frances Campbell, daughter of Sir George Campbell and Margaret Christie, on 27 August 1850. Several years after her death he married secondly, Renira Anna Purvis, daughter of the Rev. Richard Purvis, on 21 July 1874. With Frances he had four sons, and three daughters.
- Cecilia Olivia Geraldine (d. 3 March 1863) married Sir Charles Rushout Rushout, 2nd Baronet. They had three sons, and two daughters.
- Geraldine Augusta (d. 23 March 1887) married Phillippe Ferdinand Augustus de Rohan-Chabot, Vicomte de Chabot. They had no children.
- Georgina Louisa (d. 21 Nov 1864) married Thomas Molyneux-Montgomerie on 27 February 1844.
- Adelaide Georgiana Frederica (d. 19 Jan 1861) married Gen. Thomas Ashburnham on 8 February 1860. They had no children.

He died in London in April 1833, aged 52, he was succeeded in the barony by his son, Thomas, who also succeeded him as chief whip in the Whig government. Lady Foley died in 1863.

== Notes ==
Political offices
| Preceded by The Viscount Hereford | Captain of the Honourable Corps of Gentlemen-at-Arms; 1830–1833 | Succeeded by The Lord Foley |
Honorary titles
| Preceded by The Earl of Coventry | Lord Lieutenant of Worcestershire; 1831–1833 | Succeeded by The Lord Lyttelton |
Peerage of Great Britain
| Preceded by Thomas Foley | Baron Foley; 2nd creation 1793–1833 | Succeeded by Thomas Foley |
