= Thomas Foley, 1st Baron Foley (1716–1777) =

British landowner and politician

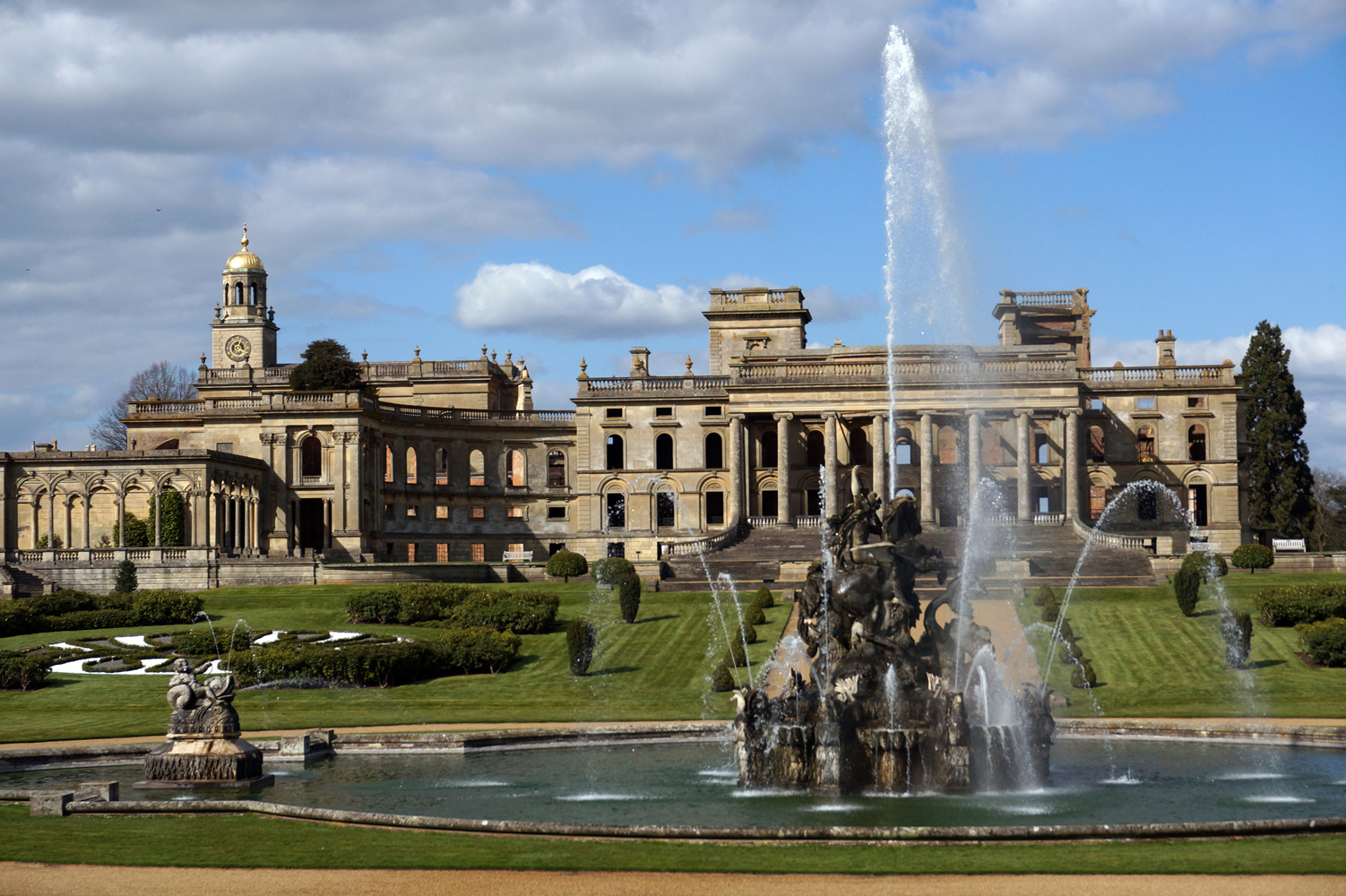
Witley Court

Thomas Foley, 1st Baron Foley (8 August 1716 – 18 November 1777), was a British landowner and politician.

== Early life ==
Foley was the son of Thomas Foley MP and his wife Hester (née Andrews) Foley and was educated at Westminster School (1724–732) and Trinity College, Cambridge (from 1732). The Foley family descended from the prominent ironmaster Thomas Foley.

== Career ==
He succeeded his father in 1749, inheriting the Stoke Edith estate in Herefordshire. Foley was also the cousin, namesake and heir of Thomas Foley, 2nd Baron Foley (a title which became extinct on the latter's death in 1766), thus also inheriting Witley Court and the extensive Great Witley estate. This included ironworks at Wilden and Shelsley Walsh, which were leased about at the end of his life.

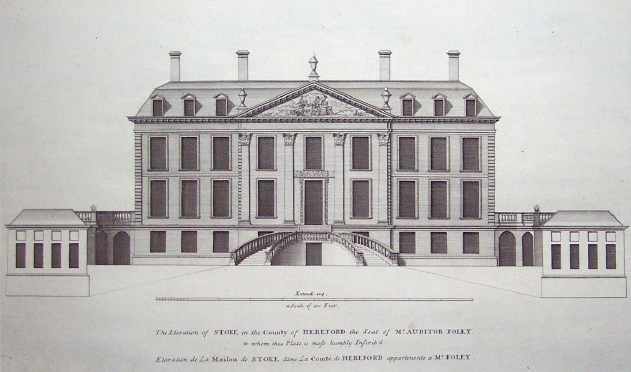
Stoke Edith

He was elected to the House of Commons for Droitwich in 1741, a constituency he represented until 1746 and again from 1754 to 1768, followed by election to represent Herefordshire between 1768 and 1776. The latter year the title previously held by his cousin was revived when Foley was raised to the peerage as Baron Foley of Kidderminster in the County of Worcester.

== Personal life ==
Lord Foley married Grace (d. 1769), daughter of George Granville, 1st Baron Lansdowne, in 1740. They had seven children:

- Thomas Foley, 2nd Baron Foley (1742–1793), to whose family he devised the Great Witley estate.
- Hon. Grace Foley (1743–1813), who married James Hamilton, 2nd Earl of Clanbrassil, in 1774.
- Hon. Edward Foley (1747–1803), to whose family he devised his paternal Stoke Edith estate.
- Hon. Andrew Foley (c. 1748–1816), to whose family he devised the Newent estate.
- Hon. Anne Foley (d. 1794), who married Sir Edward Winnington, 2nd Baronet in 1776.
- Hon. Elizabeth Foley (c. 1769–1776)
- Hon. Mary Foley (d. 1844), who married Richard Clerk.

Foley died in November 1777, aged 61. He was succeeded in the barony by the eldest son, Thomas.

Parliament of Great Britain
Preceded by Thomas Winnington; Edward Foley	Member of Parliament for Droitwich; 1741–1747; With: Thomas Winnington 1741–1742; Lord George Bentinck 1742–1747; Francis Winnington 1747	Succeeded by Francis Winnington; Edwin Sandys
Preceded by Francis Winnington; Edwin Sandys	Member of Parliament for Droitwich; 1754–1768; With: Robert Harley	Succeeded by Robert Harley; Edward Foley
Preceded by Velters Cornewall; Thomas Foley	Member of Parliament for Herefordshire; 1768–1776; With: Thomas Foley 1768–1774; Sir George Cornewall 1774–1776	Succeeded by Sir George Cornewall; Thomas Harley
Peerage of Great Britain
New creation	Baron Foley; 2nd creation 1776–1777	Succeeded by Thomas Foley
