= Edward Foley (1747–1803) =

British politician (1747–1803)

Edward Foley (16 March 1747 – 22 June 1803) was the second son of Thomas, 1st Lord Foley.

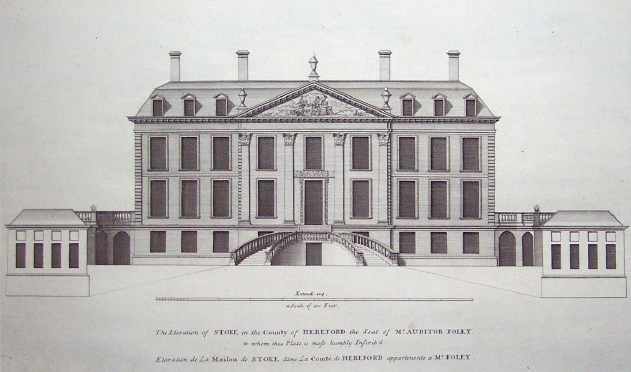
Stoke Edith

Like his brother, he was profligate with the great family wealth. His father's will settled the paternal estate at Stoke Edith, Herefordshire together with the manor of Malvern and property bought from Lord Montfort, but limited him to an annuity from the estate, the balance of the income being applied to pay his debts.

He married firstly Lady Anne Coventry (daughter of George Coventry, 6th Earl of Coventry) without having children before the marriage was dissolved by Act of Parliament in 1786. In 1790, he married his distant cousin Eliza Maria Foley Hodgetts, by whom he had two sons, Edward Thomas Foley and John Hodgetts Hodgetts-Foley. She was the heiress of the Prestwood estate, formerly owned by Philip Foley. On their marriage, the Stoke Edith estate was settled to go to their eldest son and the Prestwood estate to their second.

Edward Foley sat as Member of Parliament for Droitwich from April 1768 to May 1774; then for Worcestershire until his death.

A monument on his grave at Stoke Edith is by Robert Blore to a design by Tatham.

Parliament of Great Britain
Preceded by Robert Harley; Thomas Foley	Member of Parliament for Droitwich; 1768–1774; With: Robert Harley 1768–1774; Andrew Foley 1774	Succeeded by Andrew Foley; Rowland Berkeley
Preceded by John Ward; William Dowdeswell	Member of Parliament for Worcestershire; 1774–1801; With: William Dowdeswell 1774–1775; William Lygon 1775–1801	Succeeded by Parliament of the United Kingdom
Parliament of the United Kingdom
Preceded by Parliament of Great Britain	Member of Parliament for Worcestershire; 1801–1803; With: William Lygon	Succeeded by William Lygon; John Ward
