= Goodere =

Goodere is a surname. Notable people with the name include:

- Sir Henry Goodere (1534–1595), English nobleman
- Sir Henry Goodere (1571–1627), English courtier
- Sir Edward Goodere, 1st Baronet (1657–1739), British politician
- Sir John Dineley Goodere, 2nd Baronet (c. 1680–1741), English aristocrat and murder victim
- Samuel Goodere (1687–1741), captain in the Royal Navy
- Sir John Dineley-Goodere, 5th Baronet (1729–1809), English eccentric

== See also ==
- Goodere baronets
- Goodier, a surname
- Goodyear, a surname
- Goodyer, a surname
