= Goodyear (surname) =

Goodyear is a surname. Notable people with the surname include:

- Albert Goodyear, American archaeologist in South Carolina
- Anson Goodyear (1877–1964), American businessman and philanthropist
- Charles Goodyear (1800–1860), inventor of vulcanized rubber, Goodyear Tire Company
- Charles Goodyear (1804–1876), United States Representative from New York
- Charles W. Goodyear (1846–1911), American lawyer, turned lumber and railway industrialist
- Chip Goodyear (born 1958), former CEO of BHP Billiton
- Dana Goodyear (born 1976), American journalist and poet
- Gary Goodyear (born 1958), Canadian politician
- George Goodyear (1801–1884), American clergyman
- George Goodyear (footballer) (1916–2001), English footballer
- John Goodyear (1920–2002), American football player for the Washington Redskins
- Joseph Goodyear (1799–1839), English engraver
- Julie Goodyear (born 1942), British television actress
- Miles Goodyear (1817–1849), American fur trader and mountain man
- Paige Goodyear (born 2000), English boxer
- R. A. H. Goodyear (1877–1948), English writer
- Sara Suleri Goodyear (1953–2022), professor of English at Yale University
- Scott Goodyear (born 1959), Canadian race car driver
- Stewart Goodyear (born 1978), Canadian concert pianist and composer
- Tim Goodyear (born 1977), American comics publisher and artist
- William Goodyear (1865–1936), American football coach, newspaper editor, publisher, and politician
- William Henry Goodyear (1846–1923), architectural historian and museum curator, son of Charles Goodyear

== See also ==
- Goodere, a surname
- Goodier, a surname
- Goodyer, a surname
- Goodyear family
