= Goodyer =

Goodyer is a surname. Notable people with the surname include:

- Arthur Goodyer (1854–1932), English footballer
- John Goodyer (1592–1664), English botanist
- Paula Goodyer (born 1947), Australian journalist, author and health writer
- Robin Goodyer (born 1951), English cricketer

== See also ==
- Goodere, a surname
- Goodier, a surname
- Goodyear, a surname
