= Goodere baronets =

Escutcheon of the Goodere baronets of Burhope

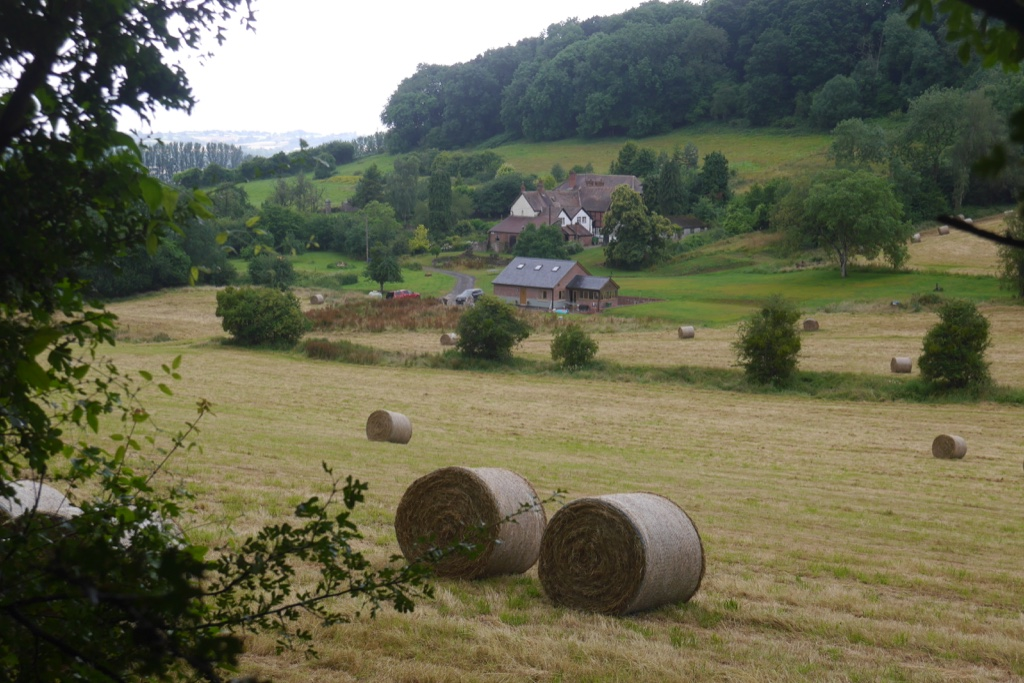
Burghope Court, Wellington, Herefordshire, in 2019

The Goodere baronetcy, "of Burhope in the County of Hereford", was a title in the Baronetage of Great Britain. It was created on 5 December 1707 for Edward Goodere, of Burghope House in the parish of Wellington, Herefordshire, later a Member of Parliament for Evesham and Herefordshire.

His son, the 2nd Baronet, was childless and devised his estate at Charleton to his sister's children and not to his younger brother Samuel the 3rd Baronet; Samuel had his brother murdered and was hanged.

The title became extinct on the death of the 5th Baronet in 1809.

== Goodere baronets, of Burhope (1707) ==
- Sir Edward Goodere, 1st Baronet (1657–1739)
- Sir John Dineley Goodere, 2nd Baronet (c. 1680–1741)
- Sir Samuel Goodere, 3rd Baronet (1687–1741)
- Sir Edward Dineley-Goodere, 4th Baronet (1729–1761)
- Sir John Dineley-Goodere, 5th Baronet (1729–1809)

== Extended family ==
The 1st Baronet's eldest (c.1681–1709 son was killed in a duel in Ireland.

Thomas Colyer Colyer-Fergusson, later 3rd Baronet, raised a question in 1900 in Notes and Queries about Samuel Goodere's first wife. He asked whether the Samuel Goodere who married Jane Nicholls, buried in Chapel Yard, Deal, Kent in 1721, and mother of Eleanor Goodere who married William Wyborn of Sholden, was the same person. Samuel Goodere married in 1723, described as a widower, Elizabeth Watts (died 1742) of Leavington or Llanvetherine, near Monmouth, Wales, who was the mother of his twin sons and daughters.

Baronetage of Great Britain
Preceded by Williams baronets	Goodere baronets of Burhope; 5 December 1707	Succeeded by Lloyd baronets
