= Gelli Farmhouse, Llanvetherine =

Gelli Farmhouse
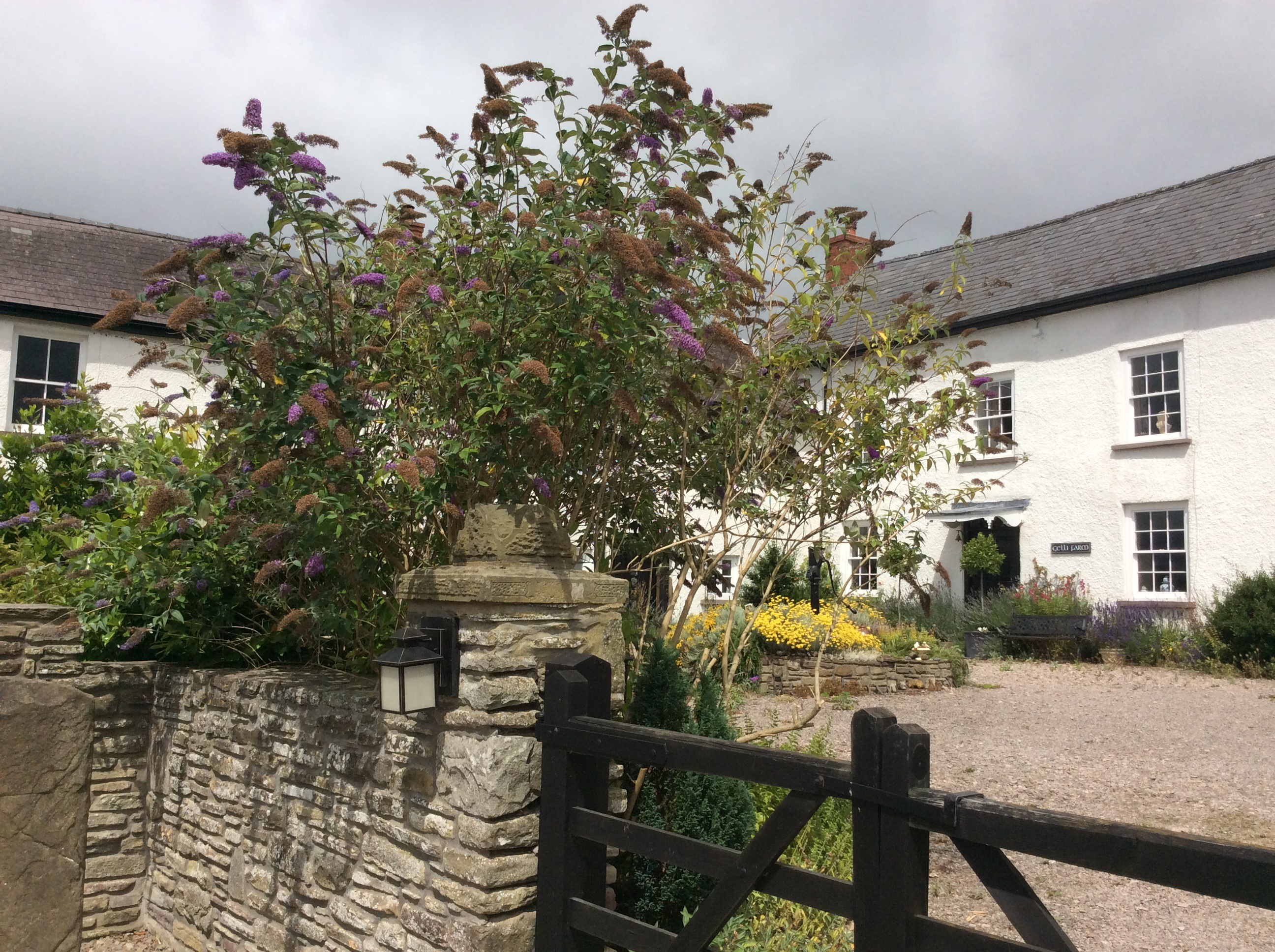
- "an exceptionally well-preserved early 17th century interior"

- Location within Monmouthshire
- 51.8473°N 2.9293°W
- Type: House
- Location: Llanvetherine, Monmouthshire

History
- Built: 17th century

Site notes
- Architectural style: Vernacular
- Governing body: Privately owned

Listed Building – Grade II*
- Official name: Gelli including attached cider house, farm range and barn
- Designated: 19 October 2000
- Reference no.: 24196

Gelli Farmhouse, Llanvetherine, Monmouthshire, is a farmhouse dating from the early 17th century. The settlement at Gelli-wig has a recorded history dating from the 14th century. The house is Grade II* listed.

== History ==
The manor of Gelli-wig is recorded as belonging to Roger de Gunter in 1349. Cadw considers that the current house is likely to have been built by James Hughes, in the early to mid-17th century. Hughes's descendant, also James, was Sheriff of Monmouthshire in 1717 and was probably responsible for the 18th century reconstruction. Later in that century, the house was the vicarage for the Reverend William Watkins, vicar of Llangattock Lingoed, Llantilio Pertholey and Llanvihangel Crucorney. The farmhouse remains a private residence.

== Architecture and description ==
The house was originally two residences, set at right angles. The left-hand block has a cider house attached to it. The house is of sandstone rubble, now rendered, of two storeys and with a slate roof. The interior is "exceptionally well-preserved" and contains important decorative features from the 17th and 18th centuries, including a "highly unusual painted" parlour. Fox and Raglan also note a "good fireplace" in the Renaissance style of their three-volume series Monmouthshire Houses.

The farmhouse is a Grade II* listed building.
