= Cocoa Tree Club =

Tory political club and informal headquarters

Cocoa Tree Club The Harley Board
- Founder: Edward Harley
- Founded: 1727
- Dissolved: 1770s (as a political organisation); 1931 (as a private members' club)
- Ideology: Toryism
- Party affiliation: Tories

The Cocoa Tree Club, also known initially as the Harley Board, was a Tory political and social club founded by Edward Harley in 1727. Alongside the High Tory Loyal Brotherhood, the Cocoa Tree Club became an important feature of the Tory party's informal organisation during the mid-18th century, with the club's premises at the Cocoa Tree chocolate house becoming the unofficial headquarters of the party in London. It ceased to fulfill a political function in the 1770s, but remained a private members' club until its closure in 1931.

== Establishment ==
Harley established his board in the autumn of 1727 following the accession of George II of Great Britain. The group was founded in response to the Loyal Brotherhood's assumption of an increasing political role and growing influence over the Tory party. At first, the Harley Board had only six Tory Members of Parliament as members, but by 1742 it had attracted a further fourteen members.

In contrast to the High Tory Brotherhood, Harley sought to attract Hanoverian Tories and moderate 'Country' Tories. Harley intended his grouping to concern itself with practical legislation to protect the landed gentry and reform the House of Commons. Harley also sought to protect the political legacy of his moderate Tory uncle, Robert Harley, 1st Earl of Oxford and Earl Mortimer. Unlike the Brotherhood, membership of the Harley Board was restricted to commoners and included non-parliamentarians; members included Sir John St Aubyn, 3rd Baronet, Jonathan Swift, Jacob Houblon, Sir Charles Mordaunt, 6th Baronet, William Bromley, Patrick Murray and Roger Newdigate. In 1734, St Aubyn and Bromley led efforts to repeal the Septennial Act 1715.

The board met every Thursday evening at the same time as the Loyal Brotherhood, but at a different location – the Cocoa Tree chocolate house on Pall Mall, London which had been established in the 1690s. During the reign of Queen Anne, the Cocoa Tree had become a favourite meeting place for Jacobities. It was already familiar to many Tories when Harley chose it in 1727 as the location for his political meetings.

A rivalry existed between the two Tory social clubs; in 1734, Sir Robert Abdy, 3rd Baronet was expelled from the Cocoa Tree Club for attending a Brotherhood meeting. However, the two clubs cooperated on matters of common party interest. Daniel Defoe commented that "a Whig would no more go to the 'Cocoa Tree' than a Tory will be seen at a coffee house in St James's".

== The Cocoa Tree as Tory party headquarters ==
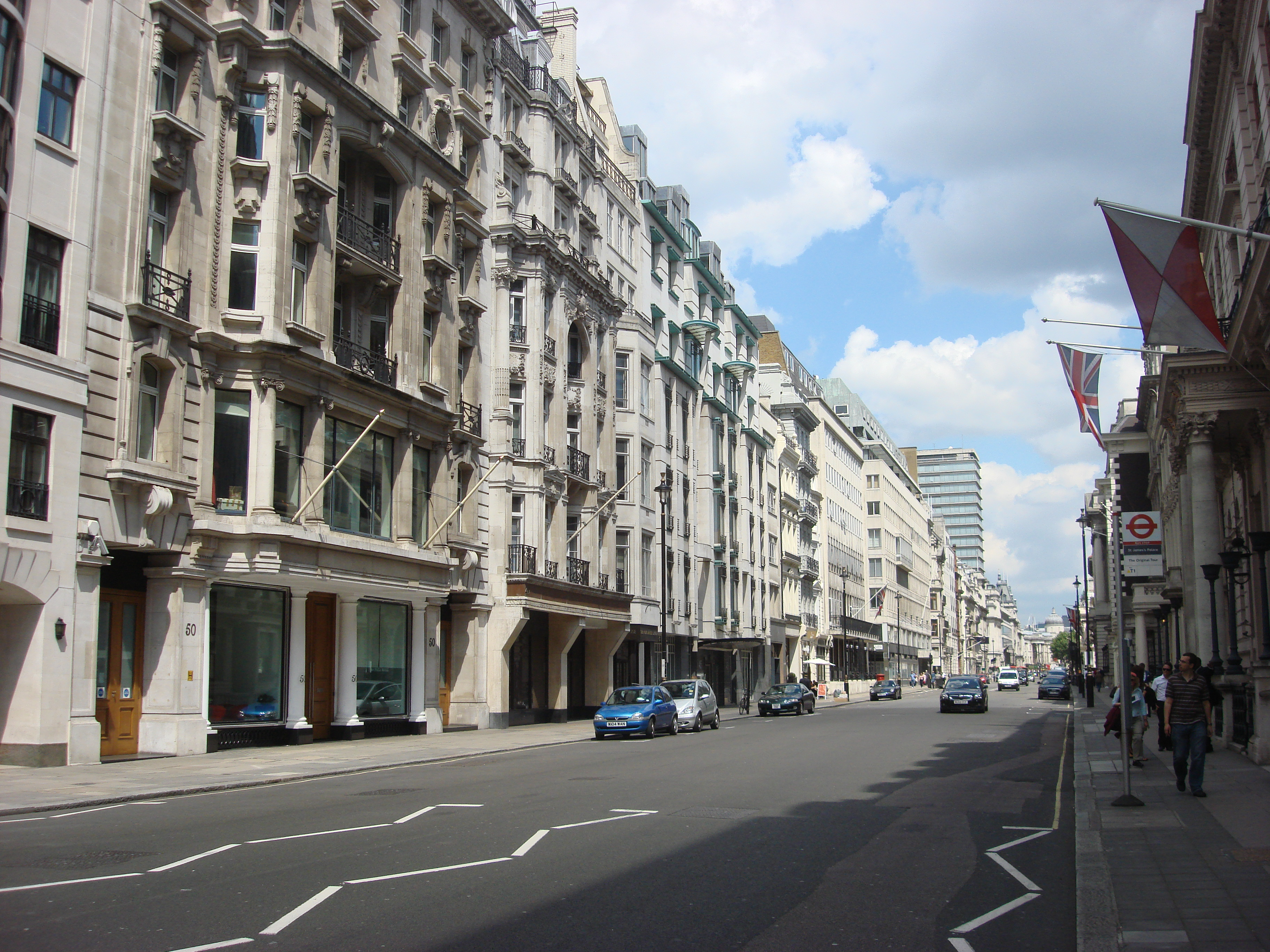
The club met in the Cocoa Tree, a chocolate house on Pall Mall, London

The importance of the Cocoa Tree chocolate house as a venue for Tory political activity increased, especially after the death of Sir William Wyndham, 3rd Baronet in 1740, which left the party without defined leadership. Influential party figures used the location for contact with the parliamentary party as a whole, as well as for more exclusive gatherings with Cocoa Tree Club members. Linda Colley described the Cocoa Tree as "a vital and durable component of Tory organisation".

During the 1740s, the chocolate house was gradually transformed into a Tory private members club. By 1754, it claimed the membership of ninety members of parliament. The Cocoa Tree therefore increasingly served as an unofficial party headquarters and was frequently used for mass meetings. By the mid-1750s the Cocoa Tree fulfilled such a recognised role in the party that its name was often used in the press and by pamphleteers as a synonym for the Tory parliamentary group. This status coincided with the declining influence of the Loyal Brotherhood over party affairs and in 1756 the Brotherhood agreed to move its meetings from St Alban's Tavern to the Cocoa Tree. In 1757, the club moved from its original premises at 98 Pall Mall to 46 Pall Mall.

== Later history ==
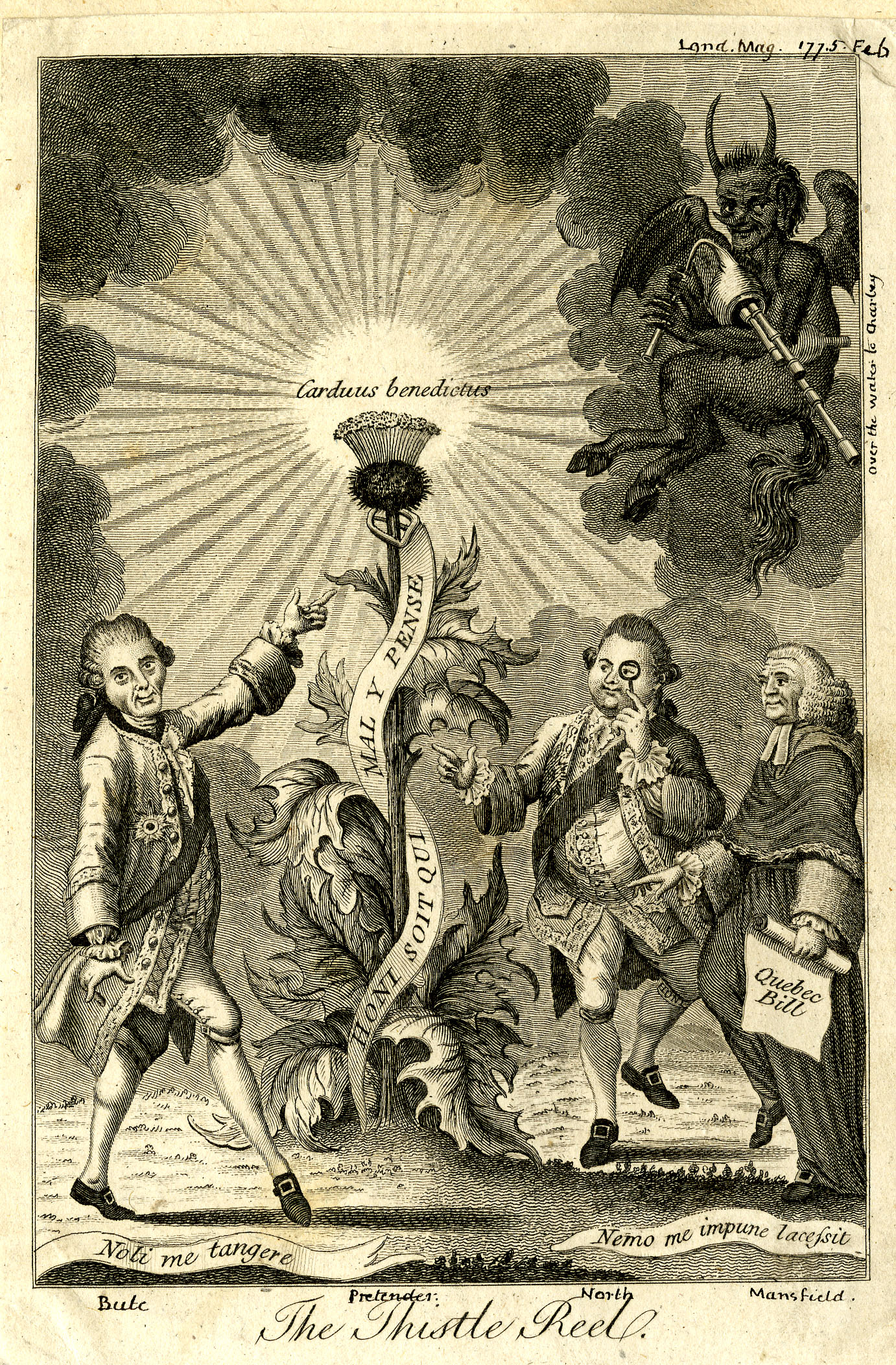
A satirical cartoon from 1775 depicting Lords Bute, North and Mansfield with Charles Edward Stuart; the caption explains this as "a vision... after a long argument at the Cocoa with the putrid Jacobites of that club"

The Tories' decline meant that they ceased to exist as an organised political entity in the early 1760s, although there was a short-lived reprieve when John Stuart, 3rd Earl of Bute – a member of the Cocoa Tree Club – became Prime Minister. The Cocoa Tree Club continued to serve a limited political function into the 1770s, by which stage it was referred to by some hostile Whigs as the 'Ministerial club'. During the 1760s, Edward Gibbon was a member of the club. By 1780, Horace Walpole commented that the club was more a resort for high gambling rather than for political influence. In 1799, the club moved to 64 St James's Street and merged with the Tory-aligned Club at Weltje's; it remained in this location until it closed in 1932.

During the 1810s and 1820s, politics was a less important feature of the club than heavy drinking; Lord Byron was a member, and both the Prince of Wales and Richard Brinsley Sheridan visited on several occasions. It was mentioned as a popular resort in the first issue of the The Spectator in 1828, and by the 1830s the club was loosely associated with the Conservative Party. It was described by Charles Dickens Jr. as having an entrance fee of £5 5s. in 1879.
