= Edward Harley, 3rd Earl of Oxford and Earl Mortimer =

British peer and Member of Parliament

The Right Honourable The Earl of Oxford and Earl Mortimer

Member of Parliament for Herefordshire
- In office 1727–1741 Serving with Velters Cornewall
- Preceded by: Velters Cornewall; Sir Edward Goodere
- Succeeded by: Velters Cornewall; Thomas Foley

Personal details
- Born: Edward Harley c. 1699
- Died: 11 April 1755 (aged 55–56) Bath, Somerset
- Spouse: Martha Morgan (after 1724)
- Parent(s): Edward Harley; Sarah Foley
- Education: Christ Church, Oxford

Edward Harley, 3rd Earl of Oxford and Earl Mortimer (c. 1699 – 11 April 1755) was a British Tory politician and peer. In 1727 he established the political and social club which would become the Cocoa Tree Club. He was the nephew of Great Britain's Chief Minister between 1711 and 1714, Robert Harley.

== Early life ==
Harley was the son and heir of Sarah Foley (the third daughter of Thomas Foley of Witley Court) and Edward Harley of Eywood, the Auditor of the Imprest and the next younger brother of Robert Harley, 1st Earl of Oxford and Earl Mortimer. Harley was educated at Westminster School and Christ Church, Oxford.

== Career ==
He was returned to Parliament as the member for Herefordshire in 1727, sitting until 1741. He was known as a Hanoverian Tory and in 1727 he established the Harley Board to further the interests of the Tory landed gentry and counteract the influence of the High Tory Loyal Brotherhood. He vigorously defended the past record of his uncle Robert's governments during Queen Anne's reign and was averse to the Jacobite flirtations of Tories such as Sir Watkin Williams-Wynn.

In March 1730, Harley proposed a bill to prevent the packing of juries and he supported efforts to repeal the Septennial Act 1715. Harley's Board, later called the Cocoa Tree Club, became the organisational nucleas of the mainstream of the Tory party during the mid-18th century, giving Harley significant influence among the opposition to the Whig supremacy.

He succeeded his father in 1735 to the Eywood estate at Titley, Herefordshire and his cousin Edward Harley, 2nd Earl of Oxford and Earl Mortimer in 1741 to the earldom and the family seat, Brampton Bryan Hall at Brampton Bryan in Herefordshire. He remained a committed Tory in the House of Lords; in 1745, Lord Chesterfield referred to him and Williams-Wynn as "the only two people to be regarded" in the Tory party. Despite his earlier dismissive approach to Jacobites in the party, in 1749 Harley was described to the Old Pretender as "one of the leading men of your Majesty's friends". Nonetheless, the Jacobite historian Thomas Carte observed that Harley's constitution (moderate temperament) prevented him from being more active in the Pretender's cause.

=== Outside parliament ===
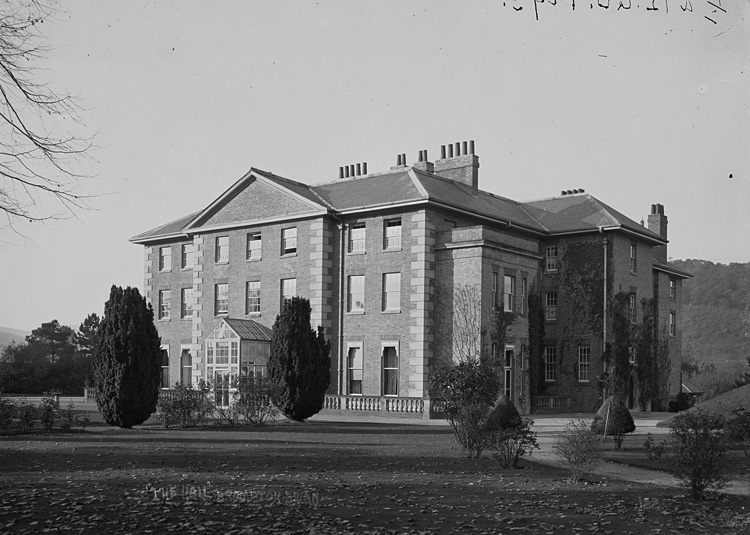
Brampton Bryan Hall

In 1746 he was appointed High Steward of Hereford for life. Harley maintained a close connection to Oxford University and, as a Radcliffe trustee, was present at the inauguration of the Radcliffe Camera in 1749. Between 1753 and his death he was one of the original trustees of the British Museum as a Harleian trustee.

One of his first acts on succeeding his cousin was to auction off his predecessor's art and coin collection through the auctioneer Cock, at an art sale held under the Piazza, Covent Garden, on 8 March 1741/2 and the five following days, with six more days being required by the coins. Nearly all the leading men of the day, including Horace Walpole, attended or were represented at this sale, and the prices varied from five shillings for an anonymous bishop's "head" to 165 guineas for van Dyck's group of "Sir Kenelm Digby, lady, and son".

== Personal life ==
On 16 March 1724 or 1725, at St. Anne's Church, Soho, he married Martha Morgan, a daughter of Sir John Morgan of Tredegar and Martha Vaughan (a daughter and co-heiress of Gwyn Vaughan of Trebarried) and the sister of Sir William Morgan and Sir Thomas Morgan. They had several children:

- Edward Harley, 4th Earl of Oxford and Earl Mortimer (1726–1790), also an MP for Hertfordshire; he married heiress Susannah Archer, a daughter of William Archer.
- Hon. John Harley (1728–1788), the Bishop of Hereford who married his cousin Roach Vaughan, daughter of Gwynne Vaughan of Trebarried; their son, Edward became 5th Earl of Oxford.
- Hon. Thomas Harley (1730–1804), Lord Mayor of London who married Anne Bangham, the daughter of Edward Bangham, MP for Leominster.
- Rev. Hon. William Harley (d. 1769).
- Lady Sarah Harvey (d. 1737).
- Lady Martha Harvey, who married Charles Milborne, of The Priory, Abergavenny, in 1764.

Lord Oxford died on 11 April 1755 and was succeeded in his titles by his eldest son Edward.

Parliament of Great Britain
Preceded by Velters Cornewall; Sir Edward Goodere	Member of Parliament for Herefordshire; 1727–1741; With: Velters Cornewall	Succeeded by Velters Cornewall; Thomas Foley
Peerage of Great Britain
Preceded by Edward Harley	Earl of Oxford and Earl Mortimer; 1741–1755	Succeeded by Edward Harley
