= Sir Edward Goodere, 1st Baronet =

British politician

Arms of Goodere: Gules, a fess between two chevrons vair

Sir Edward Goodere, 1st Baronet (1657 – 29 March 1739) was a British politician who sat in the House of Commons from 1708 to 1727. He was primarily a Tory, but in his first Parliament acted as a Whig.

== Life ==
Goodere was the only surviving son of John Goodere of Burghope, Herefordshire and his wife Anne Morgan, the daughter of John Morgan of Kent. His father was a servant of the East India Company, who eventually became deputy-governor of Bombay, and Edward is sometimes said to have been born in India. It is more likely, however, that he was born during a long sojourn by his father in England from 1656 to 1662. On his permanent return to England in 1669, his father bought the Burghope (also rendered Burhope) House in the parish of Wellington, Herefordshire.

On 21 January 1679, at Bodenham, Herefordshire, Edward Goodere married Helen (or Eleanor) Dineley, the daughter and heiress of Sir Edward Dineley of Charlton, Worcestershire, and his wife Frances Watson, the daughter of Lewis Watson, 1st Baron Rockingham. The groom was 21 and the bride 15.

Goodere was created a baronet on 5 December 1707. He was returned as Member of Parliament for Evesham at the 1708 British general election. He was returned again in 1710 and 1713.

At the 1722 British general election, Goodere was returned as MP for Herefordshire.

Goodere's wife died aged 49 in January 1714, and was buried in the Dineley family vault at Cropthorne, Worcestershire. Goodere died at Burghope on 29 March 1739, aged 82. He and his wife had three sons. His eldest son was killed in a duel. He was thus succeeded by his eldest surviving son, Sir John Dineley Goodere, 2nd Baronet, who was later strangled on board HMS Ruby, a crime for which his younger brother Samuel was executed. Sir John had left the Burghope estate to a nephew, John Foote.

Parliament of Great Britain
Preceded by Hugh Parker; John Rudge	Member of Parliament for Evesham; 1708–1715; With: John Rudge	Succeeded by John Deacle; John Rudge
Preceded by Richard Hopton; Sir Hungerford Hoskyns, Bt	Member of Parliament for Herefordshire; 1722–1727; With: Velters Cornewall	Succeeded by Velters Cornewall; Edward Harley
Baronetage of Great Britain
New creation	Baronet (of Burhope); 1707-1739	Succeeded by John Goodere
