= Great Pool Hall, Llanvetherine =

17th century mansion

Great Pool Hall
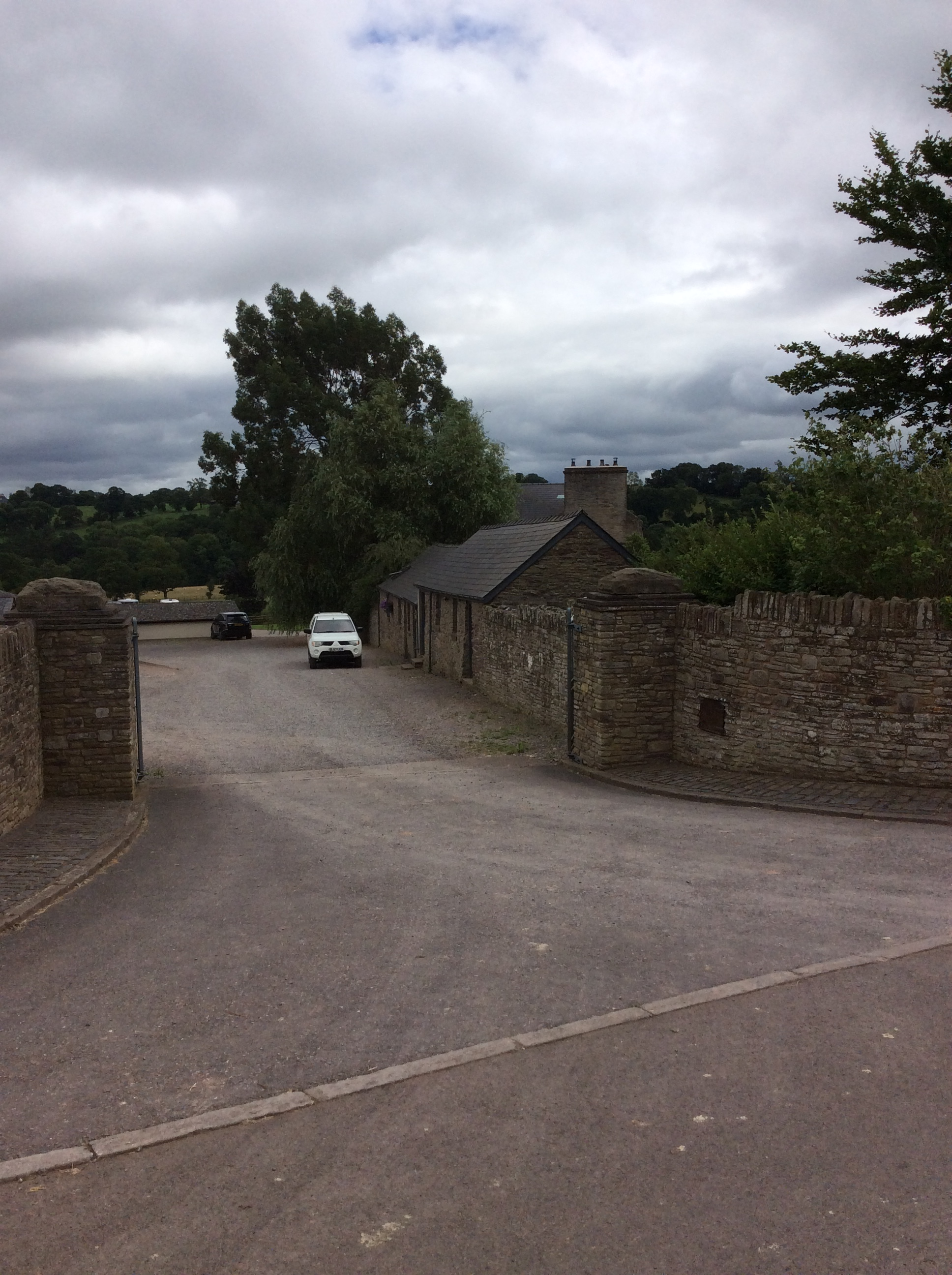
- The entrance to Great Pool Hall

- Location within Monmouthshire
- 51.8658°N 2.9144°W
- Type: House
- Location: Llanvetherine, Monmouthshire

History
- Built: 17th century

Site notes
- Architectural style: Vernacular
- Governing body: Privately owned

Listed Building – Grade II*
- Official name: Great Pool Hall
- Designated: 6 May 1952
- Reference no.: 1924

Listed Building – Grade II
- Official name: Gatepiers and wall at Great Pool Hall
- Designated: 19 October 2000
- Reference no.: 24189

Listed Building – Grade II
- Official name: Barn at Great Pool Hall
- Designated: 19 October 2000
- Reference no.: 24199

Great Pool Hall, Llanvetherine, Monmouthshire is a mansion dating from the early 17th century. Its construction is unusual in that it is built around a timber frame, unlike the more common stone construction of houses of this date and location. It is a Grade II* listed building. The associated gate piers and garden walls, and the separate barn have their own Grade II listings.

== History ==
The hall is dated 1619 and the builder was John Powell of Llangattock Lingoed, from whom the name "Pool" derives. The mansion was extended in the mid-17th century and the "impressive new staircase" was added at this time. Few subsequent alterations to the house have taken place. The hall remains a private residence.

== Architecture and description ==
The timber frame construction is described by the architectural historian John Newman as "remarkable". Cadw records the construction as "more reminiscent of the tall jettied town houses of Hereford or Gloucester than the typical stone house normally found in Monmouthshire" The building stone used to case the timber frame is shale. The house is built to an L-plan, of three storeys, with "three great chimney-breasts". The roof is of slate.

The interior contains a dog-leg stair in oak, which Newman describes as a "splendid object" but does not consider to be original to the house.

The hall is a Grade II* listed building. Its gates, and the attached wall, together with the "fine seven-bay" barn, have their own Grade II listings.
