= Thomas Foley (died 1749) =

English politician (c. 1695 – 1749)

Thomas Foley (c. 1695 – 3 April 1749), of Stoke Edith, Herefordshire was a British landowner and Member of Parliament.

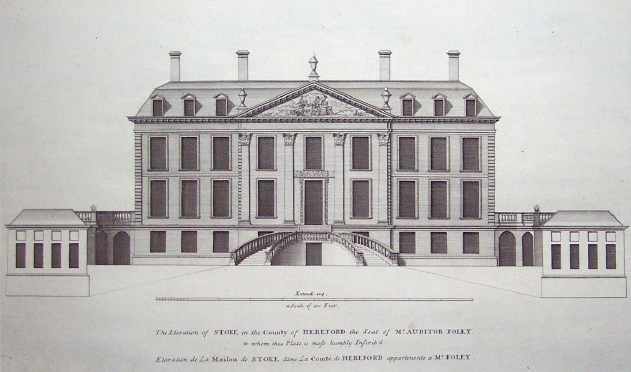
Stoke Edith

He was the eldest son of Thomas Foley (auditor of the imprests) and inherited the latter's estates on his death in 1737. He represented Hereford in Parliament from 1734 to 1741, and Herefordshire from 1742 to 1747.

He continued the family interest in ironmaking in the Forest of Dean, initially in partnership with his father. However, in his time leases were not renewed as they expired, and the business declined to being a shadow of what it once had been.

He married five times.

1. Hester Andrews, daughter of Thomas Andrews and Elizabeth Young. Children:
  - Martin Andrew Foley
  - Thomas Foley, created first Baron Foley of the second creation in 1776
2. Mary Warter, daughter of John Warter. Children:
  - Robert Foley, Dean of Worcester
  - Sarah Foley
3. Elizabeth Wolstenholme, daughter of Henry Wolstenholme. Child:
  - Paul Jermyn Foley
4. Elizabeth Unett, daughter of Robert Unett
5. Catherine Gwyn, daughter of Francis Gwyn

== Sources ==
- Burkes Peerage

Parliament of Great Britain
Preceded by Marquess of Carnarvon; Thomas Geers Winford	Member of Parliament for Hereford; 1734–1741; With: Sir John Morgan, Bt	Succeeded by Edward Cope Hopton; Thomas Geers Winford
Preceded by Velters Cornewall; Edward Harley	Member of Parliament for Herefordshire; 1742–1747; With: Velters Cornewall	Succeeded by Velters Cornewall; Lord Harley
