= Sir John Dineley-Goodere, 5th Baronet =

Arms of Goodere: Gules, a fess between two chevrons vair

Sir John Dineley-Goodere, 5th Baronet (1729–1809) was an English eccentric.

He was the second of twin sons of Samuel Goodere, an officer in the British Royal Navy, by his wife Elizabeth Watts. Samuel Goodere was convicted and hanged for the murder of his elder brother Sir John Dineley Goodere, 2nd Baronet in 1741. The elder of the twins, Edward, succeeded as the next of the Goodere baronets, but died insane and unmarried in March 1761, aged 32.

On his elder brother's death, John inherited the baronetcy, but what little remained of the family estates he soon wasted; around 1770 he sold his estate at Burhope, Herefordshire to Sir James Peachey (created Lord Selsey in 1794), and he lived for a time in a state bordering on destitution. At length his friendship with the Pelhams, coupled with the interest of Lord North, procured for him the pension and residence of a poor knight of Windsor. Henceforward he seems to have used the surname of Dineley only.

He rendered himself conspicuous by the oddity of his dress, demeanour, and mode of life. He became one of the chief sights of Windsor, Berkshire. Very early each morning he locked up his house in Windsor Castle, which no one entered but himself, and went forth to purchase provisions.

He then wore a large cloak called a roquelaure, beneath which appeared a pair of thin legs encased in dirty silk stockings. He had a formidable umbrella, and he stalked along upon pattens. All luxuries, whether of meat, or tea, or sugar, or butter, were renounced ... Wherever crowds were assembled—wherever royalty was to be looked upon—there was Sir John Dineley. He then wore a costume of the days of George II—the embroidered coat, the silk-flowered waistcoat, the nether garments of faded velvet carefully meeting the dirty silk stocking, which terminated in the half-polished shoe surmounted by the dingy silver buckle. The old wig, on great occasions, was newly powdered, and the best cocked hat was brought forth, with a tarnished lace edging. He had dreams of ancient genealogies, and of alliances still subsisting between himself and the first families of the land. A little money to be expended in law proceedings was to put him in possession of enormous wealth. That money was to be obtained through a wife. To secure for himself a wife was the business of his existence; to display himself properly where women most do congregate was the object of his savings. The man had not a particle of levity in these proceedings; his deportment was staid and dignified. He had a wonderful discrimination in avoiding the tittering girls, with whose faces he was familiar. But perchance some buxom matron or timid maiden who had seen him for the first time gazed upon the apparition with surprise and curiosity. He approached. With the air of one bred in courts he made his most profound bow; and taking a printed paper from his pocket, reverently presented it and withdrew

— Quoted from Penny Magazine. x. 356–7

Specimens of these marriage proposals, printed after the rudest fashion with the author's own hands, are given in Bernard Burke's Romance of the Aristocracy Occasionally he advertised for wives in the newspapers. He also printed some extraordinary rhymes under the title of "Methods to get Husbands. Measure in words and syllables ... With the advertised marriage offer of Sir John Dineley, Bart., of Charleton, near Worcester, extending to 375,000l., to the Reader of this Epistle, if a single lady, and has above One Hundred Guineas fortune." A copy survives in the British Museum. Burke states that though undoubtedly a monomaniac, in other matters Dineley was both sane and shrewd. Two or three times a year he visited Vauxhall and the theatres, taking care to apprise the public of his intention through the medium of the most fashionable daily papers. Wherever he went the place was invariably well attended, especially by women. Dineley persevered in his addresses to the ladies till the very close of his life, but without success. He died at Windsor in November 1809, aged about eighty. At his decease the baronetcy became extinct.

Baronetage of Great Britain
Preceded by Edward Dineley-Goodere	Baronet (of Burhope); 1761–1809	Extinct
