= Edward Harley, 4th Earl of Oxford and Earl Mortimer =

British peer and Tory politician

The Right Honourable The Earl of Oxford and Earl Mortimer DCL FRS
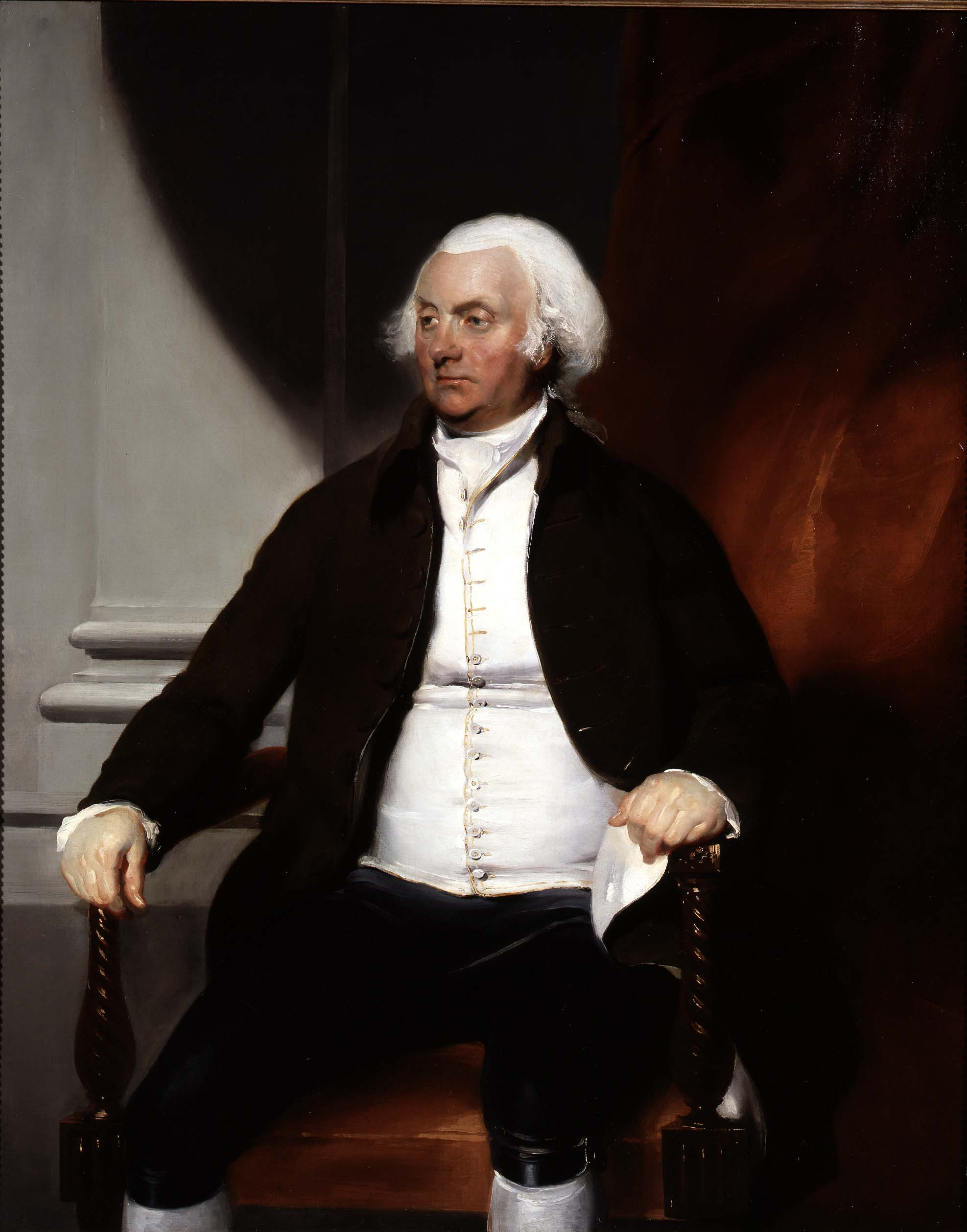
- Portrait of Lord Oxford by Sir Thomas Lawrence, c. 1790

Member of Parliament for Herefordshire
- In office 1747–1755 Serving with Velters Cornewall
- Preceded by: Thomas Foley; Velters Cornewall
- Succeeded by: Sir John Morgan, Bt; Velters Cornewall

Personal details
- Born: Edward Harley; 2 September 1726 Westminster, London
- Died: 11 October 1790 (aged 64) Brampton Bryan Hall, Brampton Bryan, Herefordshire
- Party: Conservative
- Spouse: Susannah Archer (after 1751)
- Relations: John Harley (brother); Thomas Harley (brother); William Morgan (grandfather)
- Parent(s): Edward Harley, 3rd Earl of Oxford and Earl Mortimer; Martha Morgan
- Education: Westminster School
- Alma mater: Christ Church, Oxford

Edward Harley, 4th Earl of Oxford and Earl Mortimer, FRS (2 September 1726 – 11 October 1790), styled Lord Harley from 1741 to 1755, was a British peer and Tory politician.

== Early life ==
Harley was the eldest son of Edward Harley, 3rd Earl of Oxford and Earl Mortimer and Martha Morgan, daughter of Welsh politician William Morgan. His two younger brothers were John Harley, Dean of Windsor and then Bishop of Hereford; and the politician Thomas Harley, who was Lord Mayor of London and also sat in Parliament.

He was educated at Westminster School between 1735 and 1744; and then Christ Church, Oxford, graduating with a Doctor of Civil Law in 1748.

== Career ==
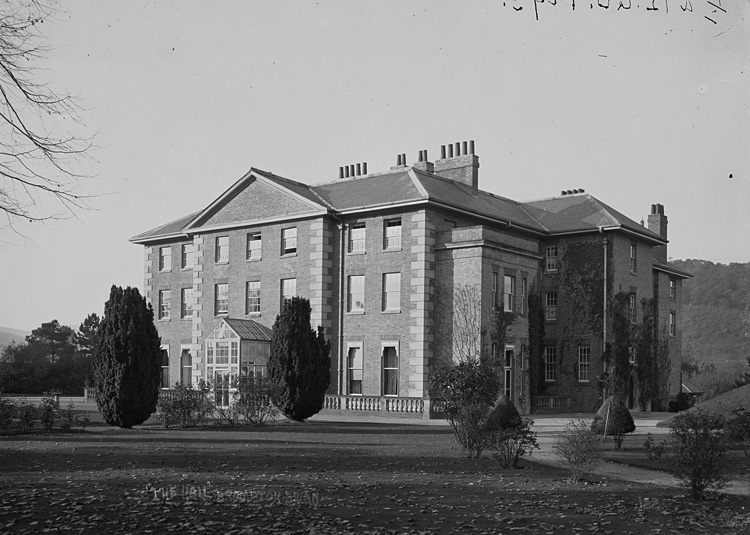
Brampton Bryan Hall

Harley was elected as MP for Herefordshire in at the 1747 general election, even though he was only 20 years old. Prior to the election, Lord Foley wrote to Harley's father, "As he is under age I am in great fear lest some trick should be played on him on the day of election ... which if it should happen I think would be of the most evil consequence to your family as well as to the interest of the county."

He returned unopposed and took a seat on the treasury board, serving until in 1755 he succeeded to his father's titles and estates, including the family seat of Brampton Bryan Castle and Hall. He was High Steward of Hereford from 1755, a Lord of the Bedchamber from 1760, and Lord Lieutenant of Radnorshire from 1766, all until his death. He was also Harleian Trustee at the British Museum from 1755 until his death.

== Personal life ==
In 1751, he married heiress Susannah Archer, who brought a dowry of £50,000 (equivalent to £9,776,833 in 2025). Susannah was a daughter of William Archer and his second wife Susanna Newton (a daughter of Sir John Newton, 3rd Baronet of Barrs Court, Gloucestershire).

He died at Brampton Bryan Hall at the age of 64. As he had no children, his titles and estates passed to his nephew Edward Harley.

Parliament of Great Britain
Preceded by Thomas Foley; Velters Cornewall	Member of Parliament for Herefordshire; 1747–1755; With: Velters Cornewall	Succeeded by Sir John Morgan, Bt; Velters Cornewall
Political offices
Preceded by The Earl of Essex	Lord of the Bedchamber; 1761–1790	Succeeded by The Viscount Wentworth
Honorary titles
Preceded by Howell Gwynne	Lord Lieutenant of Radnorshire; 1766–1790	Succeeded by Thomas Harley
Peerage of Great Britain
Preceded by Edward Harley	Earl of Oxford and Earl Mortimer; 1755–1790	Succeeded by Edward Harley
