= Goodier =

Goodier is a surname. Notable persons with that surname include:

- David Goodier (born 1954), English bass guitarist
- James N. Goodier, (1905–1969), English American professor of applied mechanics
- Lewis E. Goodier, Jr. (1885–1961), American aviator
- Mark Goodier (born 1961), British radio disc jockey
- Ted Goodier (1902–1967), English professional footballer and football manager

== See also ==
- Goodere, a surname
- Goodyear, a surname
- Goodyer, a surname
