= Velters Cornewall =

English politician

Velters Cornewall (1697 – 3 April 1768) was an English politician.

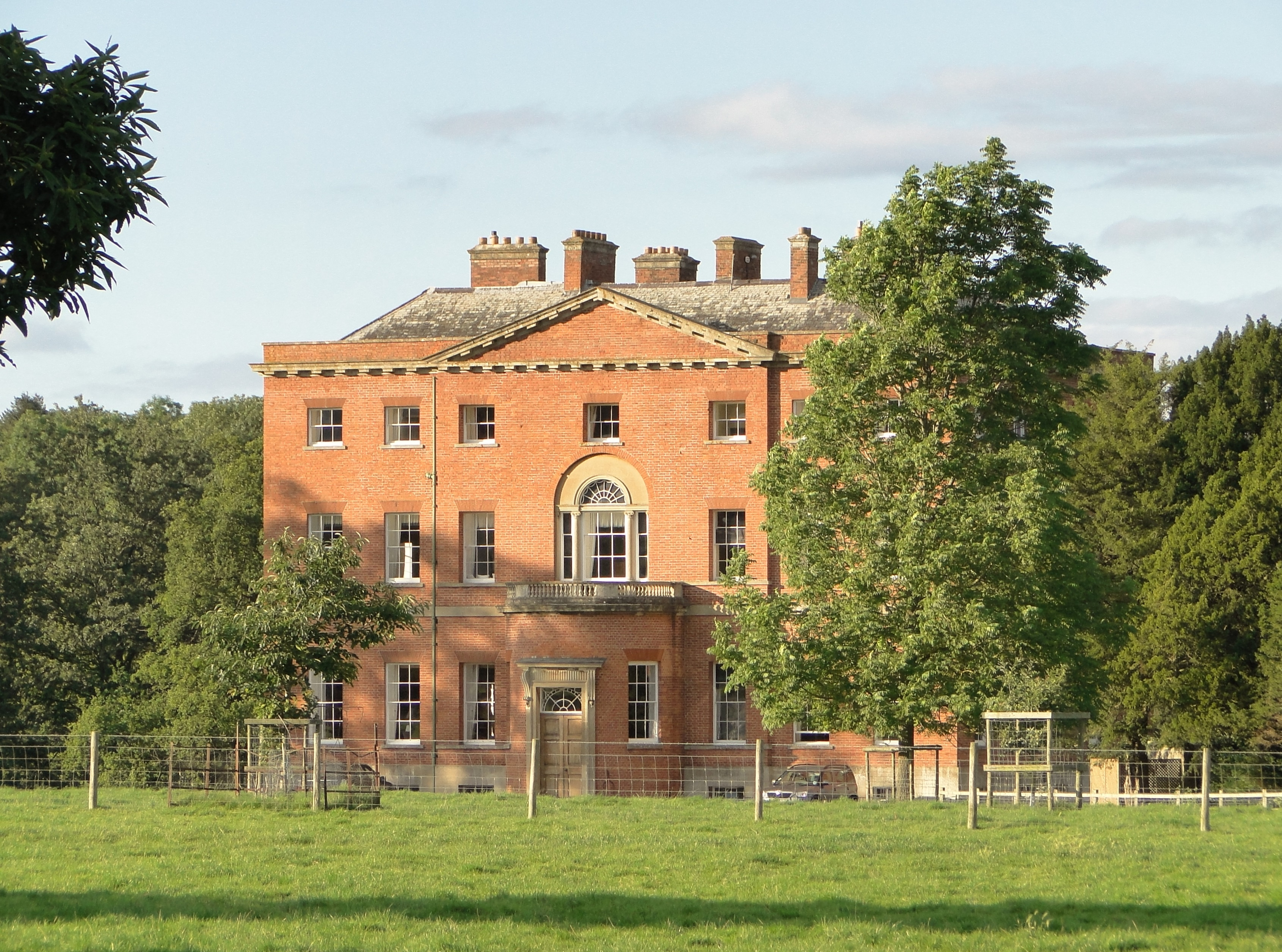
Moccas Court

He was born in 1697, the second surviving son of Henry Cornewall, and the first with his second wife Susanna. He was educated at Christ Church, Oxford, where he matriculated on 8 July 1714 and entered Lincoln's Inn. He succeeded his father in 1717, inheriting property in Herefordshire which included Moccas Park.

In 1721 he made his first move into politics, writing to his cousin the Earl of Oxford, seeking to be appointed parliamentary candidate at Leominster. Oxford replied that he had already promised the seat to Sir Archer Croft, but "I have the greatest regard for your family, and should be glad of any opportunity to show the esteem for your person." The following year, he was selected to represent Herefordshire, a seat that he would hold for the next 46 years.

On 26 February 1745 he seconded a motion calling for a parliamentary enquiry into the Battle of Toulon the previous year, in which his younger brother James Cornewall had been killed. The motion was passed, and Cornewall appointed to chair a Committee of the Whole House to look into the matter.

Cornewall spoke on several occasions in opposition to the Cider Bill of 1763. This stand was popular back home, with Herefordshire a prominent cider-producing county to this day. Ballads were written in his honour, and on 6 June 1763 "the High Sheriff, Gentlemen, Clergy, and Freeholders [of Herefordshire] presented an address [...] expressing warmest thanks for [his] diligence and steadiness in opposing the late tax."

He married three times. First, in April 1722, to Judith, the daughter of Sir James Herbert and widow of Sir Thomas Powell. Together they had a son who died in infancy. His second wife was Jane, the daughter of Edmund Bray MP, whom he married in October 1734. She died on 10 April the following year. Finally, on 2 April 1737, he married Catherine (d. 1777) the youngest daughter and co-heir of William Hanbury of Byfleet, Surrey. Catherine bore him two children:

- Frederick Henry Cornewall, baptised 10 October 1749 but died the same year
- Catherine Cornewall (1752-1835), who became his sole heir.

Velters died on 3 April 1768 and was buried in Hereford Cathedral. A monument to his memory was erected on the South wall of the Nave. It was moved to the cloister as part of the renovations performed by George Gilbert Scott a century later.

His daughter married Sir George Amyand on 18 July 1771 at St George's, Hanover Square. Following his late father-in-law's bequest (including Moccas Court), Sir George took on his wife's surname.

Parliament of Great Britain
Preceded by Richard Hopton; Sir Hungerford Hoskyns	Member of Parliament for Herefordshire; 1722–1768; With: Sir Edward Goodere (1722-27); Edward Harley (1727-42); Thomas Foley (1742-47); Lord Harley (1747-55); Sir John Morgan (1755-67); Thomas Foley (1767-68)	Succeeded by Thomas Foley; Thomas Foley
