= Loyal Brotherhood =

High Tory political and social club

The Loyal Brotherhood The Board of Brothers
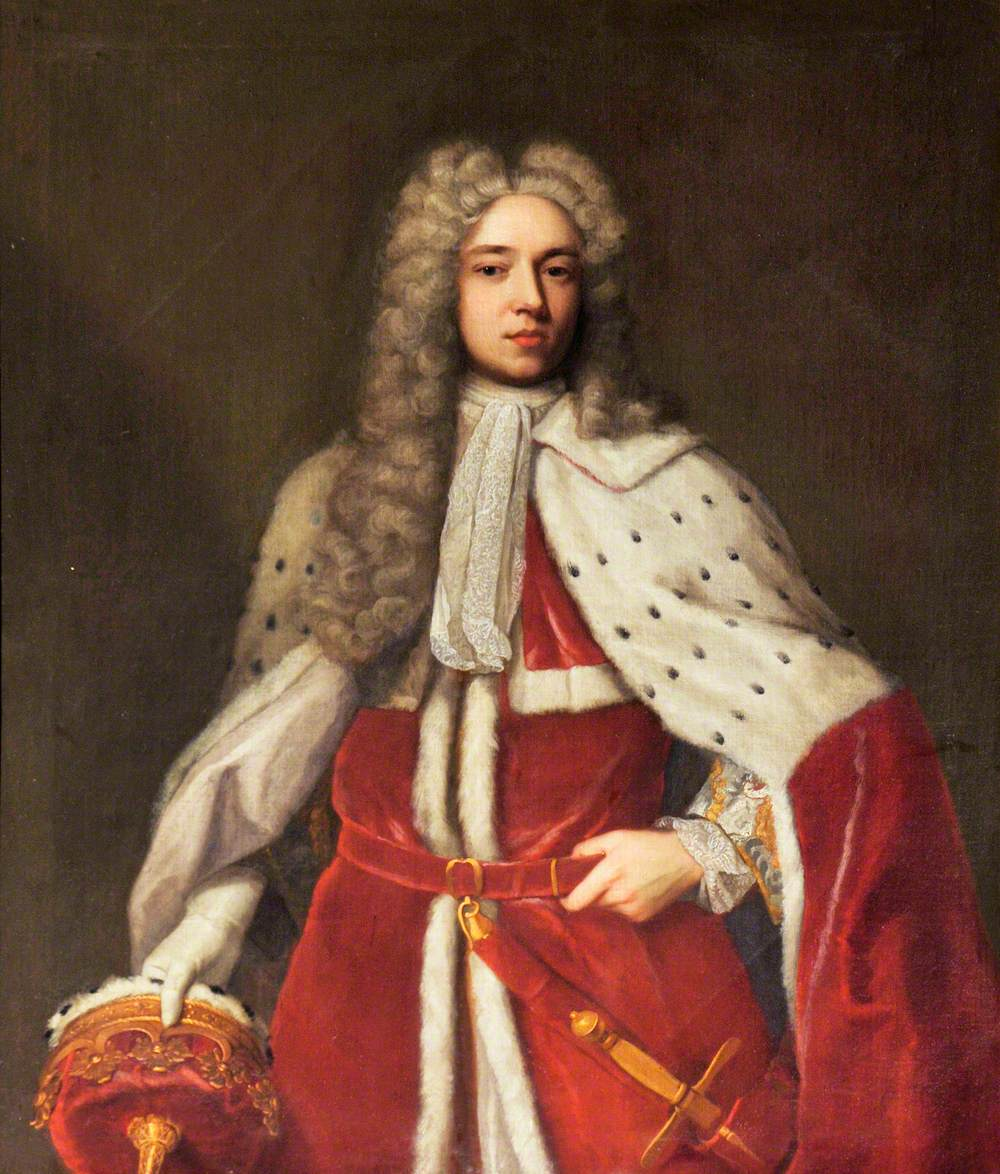
- The Duke of Beaufort, founder of the Loyal Brotherhood
- Founder: Henry Somerset, 2nd Duke of Beaufort
- Founded: 1709
- Dissolved: c.1833
- Merged into: Cocoa Tree Club
- Ideology: High Toryism, High Church, Jacobitism
- Party affiliation: Tories

The Loyal Brotherhood was a High Tory political and social club, founded by leading members of the Tory party in 1709. It existed throughout the period known as the Whig supremacy and became an important element in the Tory party's informal organisational structure, especially during the party's proscription from 1715 to 1760.

The Loyal Brotherhood continued to meet until at least 1833, by which time it was a drinking club with membership restricted to Tory peers and other aristocrats.

== Establishment ==
The Loyal Brotherhood, also initially called the Uncaptious Brothers and the Board of Brothers, was instituted by Henry Somerset, 2nd Duke of Beaufort in 1709, during a period which saw a proliferation of political social, drinking and dining clubs, especially in London. The Loyal Brotherhood was, for the first decade of its existence, primarily a drinking club. Its first members were almost exclusively High Churchmen; among them were Basil Feilding, 4th Earl of Denbigh, William Craven, 2nd Baron Craven, Nicholas Leke, 4th Earl of Scarsdale and Other Windsor, 2nd Earl of Plymouth.

== Organisation ==
The club was administered by a board, which usually consisted of twenty-five members. This board elected four 'Elder Brothers': a champion, a secretary, a 'bell-ringer' and a president, who oversaw weekly meetings and was appointed for life. Charles Noel Somerset was president between 1746 and 1756, succeeding John Leveson-Gower, 1st Earl Gower. The club met at a recognised time and place every week while Parliament was sitting. The club changed its venue at least ten times between 1709 and 1756; locations included Fountain Tavern in the Strand and St Alban's Tavern.

== Politics ==
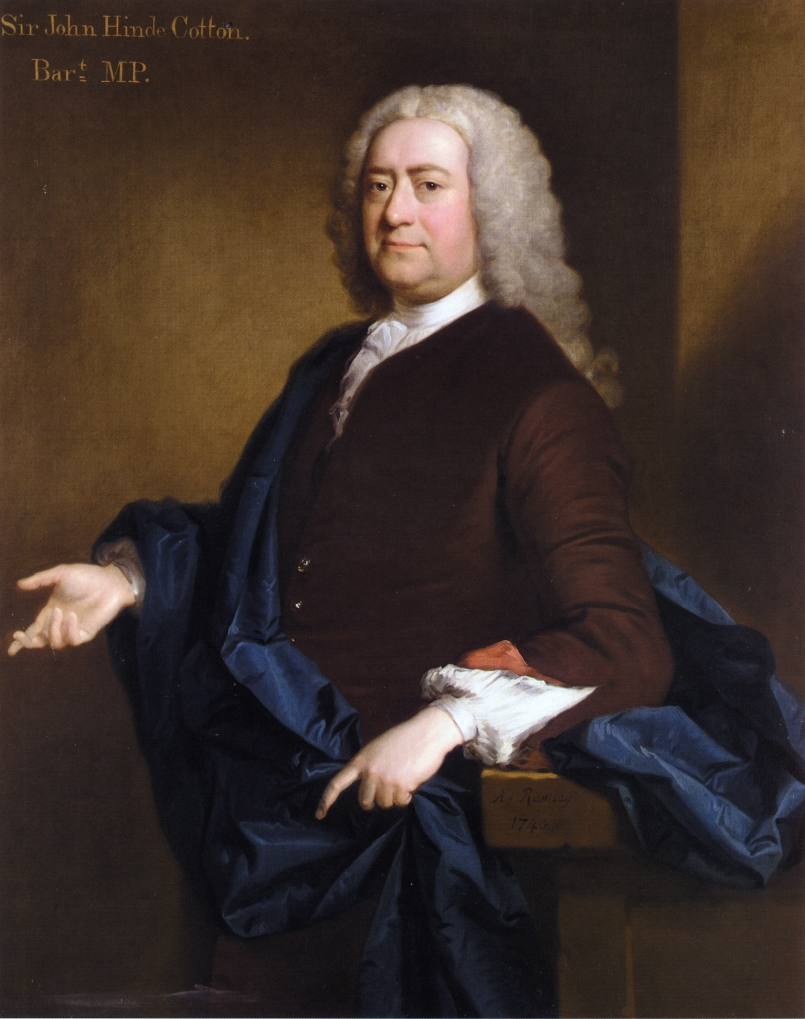
Sir John Hynde Cotton, 3rd Baronet was a Tory MP, Jacobite, and leading figure in the Loyal Brotherhood, serving as vice-president

Throughout its existence, the club's politics were defined by the High Tory and High Church beliefs of its members. Sir William Wyndham, 3rd Baronet, the leader of the Tory opposition in the House of Commons during the reign of King George I and during the early years of King George II, was elected a brother. After the death of Wyndham in 1740, the Tory party leadership became less defined, but the London-based club provided the machinery to regularise the control of a working party oligarchy. With the Whigs holding a monopoly on the machinery of government from 1714, it was the Tories who developed political clubs as a component of party management.

For much of the club's early existence, many members were crypto-Jacobites and several members were implicated in Jacobite plots. James Hamilton, 4th Duke of Hamilton, elected a brother in 1711, was arrested in 1708 for suspected Jacobitism. The Earl of Scarsdale was imprisoned for supposed complicity in the Jacobite rising of 1715, while brother William North, 6th Baron North was arrested in 1722 for involvement in the Atterbury Plot. Horace Walpole dismissively referred to the club's board as "the Jacobite club" after it was involved in several meetings to coordinate opposition to Walpole's ministry. However, the club's membership was not exclusively Jacobite in its composition, and reflected a broader High Tory, anti-Whig sentiment. For example, brother Thomas Strangways was listed among the Hanoverian Tories and brother Viscount Feilding took up arms against the rebels in the Jacobite rising of 1745.

From 1727 to the 1770s, the club met at the same time each week as the Tory 'Harley Board', a club established by Edward Harley, which created an informal rivalry between the two. While Harley's club, which met at the Cocoa Tree, represented a broader and more pragmatic 'Country' Toryism, the Loyal Brotherhood continued to be linked to more reactionary High Tory politics. However, the two clubs increasingly cooperated in advancing common party interests over this period; on 1 May 1749, Edward Harley addressed a meeting of the Loyal Brotherhood at St Alban's Tavern.

In addition to the discussion of politics, the club retained a highly social focus, including by indulging in gambling. The first bets recorded at the club were in 1735 (although gambling likely pre-dated this) and the club kept a dedicated betting book to record members' wagers from 1771. Members did not usually bet for money but for wine, with the usual stake being one gallon and first wagers of 'twelve flasks' or 'six bottles'.

== Membership ==
Individual status and family connections were as important qualifications for membership as High Tory beliefs. In accordance with the quasi-masonic rituals popular at the time, new members underwent an initiation ceremony and were each required to donate a portrait to the club. Eight of the fourteen commoners who joined the Loyal Brotherhood between 1709 and 1713 were also members of the Tory October Club. After 1725 the club's membership, which had previously been open to non-parliamentarians, was restricted to Tory peers and Members of Parliament.

Notable members of the Loyal Brotherhood included James Cecil, 5th Earl of Salisbury, James Barry, 4th Earl of Barrymore, Sir Jermyn Davers, 4th Baronet, Sir John Hynde Cotton, 3rd Baronet (vice-president), Sir Watkin Williams-Wynn, 3rd Baronet, Humphrey Parsons, Sir John Philipps, 4th Baronet, Edward Colston, Wriothesley Russell, 2nd Duke of Bedford, Sir Walter Bagot, 5th Baronet, Thomas Rowney, Richard Bulkeley, 4th Viscount Bulkeley, William Griffith, Sir Cholmeley Dering, 4th Baronet, Sir John Walter, 3rd Baronet, George Dashwood, Clayton Milborne and James Dashwood.

== Decline ==
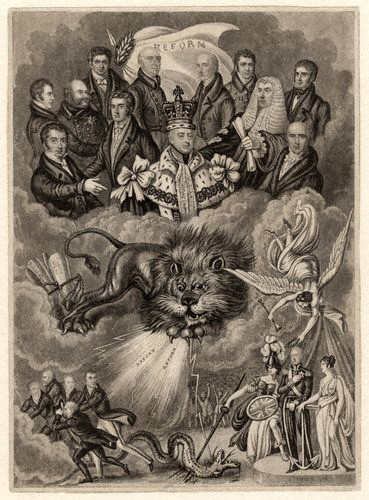
The Reform Act 1832 marked the end for the old High Tory, landed interests represented by the Loyal Brotherhood

In the late 1740s, the group met at the St Alban's Tavern where it attracted many supporters of Frederick, Prince of Wales. The Loyal Brotherhood survived as the Tory party reduced in size and formal organisation, with the club increasingly confining its political activity to appropriate party toasts and bets on the course of parliamentary business. By 1756, it had lost most of its leading politicians, with the new generation of Tories such as William Northey having less sympathy for seemingly antiquated High Tory sentiments and social exclusivism.

In May 1756, the Brotherhood tactility acknowledged its lack of a distinct political function and moved its meetings to the Cocoa Tree Club, where it survived as an exclusive drinking group for peers and baronets. Its last recorded meeting was in 1833, held amidst the reactionary crisis caused by the passage of the Reform Act 1832.
