= Sir John Morgan, 4th Baronet =

British Tory politician

Sir John Morgan, 4th Baronet (11 July 1710 – 1767), of Kinnersley Castle, Herefordshire, was a British Tory politician who sat in the House of Commons between 1734 and 1767.

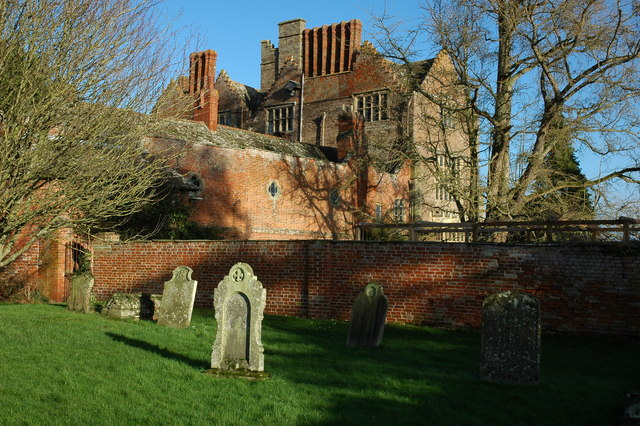
Kinnersley Castle

Morgan was the only son of Sir Thomas Morgan, 3rd Baronet. He succeeded to the baronetcy on the death of his father on 14 December 1716. He was educated at Westminster School in 1721 and matriculated at Queen’s College, Oxford 1726

At the 1734 British general election, Morgan was returned as a Tory Member of Parliament for Hereford. He voted with the Opposition. He did not stand in 1741.

Morgan married Anne Jackobson, daughter of Sir Jacob Jackobson, of Walthamstow, Essex, director of the South Sea Company, on 17 December 1750. He was High Sheriff of Herefordshire for the year 1752 to 1753.

Morgan was returned unopposed for Herefordshire at a by-election on 5 May 1755. He was unopposed again at the 1761 British general election He voted against the Grenville Administration over general warrants, in February 1764. He did not vote against the repeal of the Stamp Act but voted against Chatham’s Administration on the land tax. He is not known to have spoken in the House.

Morgan died without issue on 29 April 1767 and the baronetcy became extinct.

Parliament of Great Britain
Preceded by Marquess of Carnarvon; Thomas Geers	Member of Parliament for Hereford; 1734–1741; With: Thomas Foley	Succeeded by Edward Cope Hopton; Thomas Geers Winford
Preceded by Velters Cornewall; Lord Harley	Member of Parliament for Herefordshire; 1755–1767; With: Velters Cornewall	Succeeded by Velters Cornewall; Thomas Foley
Baronetage of England
Preceded by Thomas Morgan	Baronet (of Langattock); 1716-1767	Extinct
