= Llanvetherine =

Coordinates: 51.849720°N 2.924348°W

Llanvetherine: Welsh: Llanwytherin
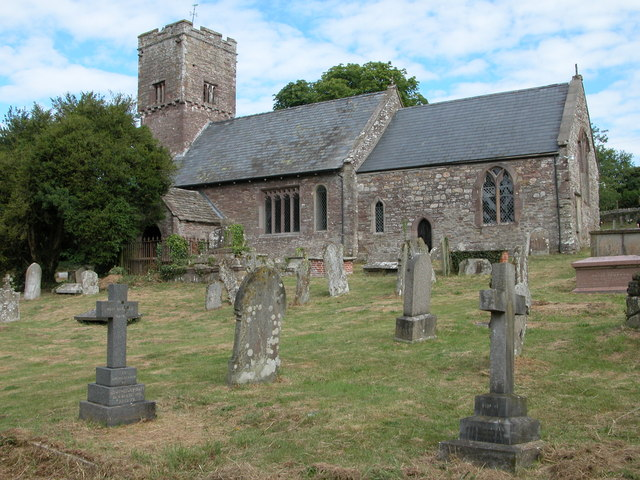
- Church of St James the Elder

- Location within Monmouthshire
- OS grid reference: SO364172
- Community: Skenfrith
- Principal area: Monmouthshire
- Preserved county: Gwent
- Country: Wales
- Sovereign state: United Kingdom
- Post town: ABERGAVENNY
- Postcode district: NP7
- Dialling code: 01873
- Police: Gwent
- Fire: South Wales
- Ambulance: Welsh
- UK Parliament: Monmouth

Llanvetherine (Welsh: Llanwytherin) is a village in the community of Skenfrith, Monmouthshire, Wales. It is located five miles north east of Abergavenny on the B4521 road to Ross-on-Wye. The name comes from the Welsh Saint Gwytherin.

== History and amenities ==
The village has a church, dedicated to St. James the Elder.

Llanvetherine is near Whitecastle, one of three important border castles built by the Marcher Lords after the Norman invasion of Wales to control this sector of the Welsh Marches.

Offa's Dyke Path long distance footpath passes through the village. The King's Arms Pub was closed in the early 2000s and is now a residential property.

The widow of Captain Samuel Goodere who was executed for murdering his brother Sir John Dineley Goodere, 2nd Baronet, in 1741 was living in Llanvetherine when she wrote her Will in 1742, leaving property in the area to her three daughters Elizabeth, Anne and Mary and to her son John Goodere. Her maiden name was Elizabeth Watts. (A copy of her Will, and Samuel Goodere's Will dated 1741, can be downloaded from the National Archives department at Kew).
