= Thomas Vernon (Worcester MP) =

Thomas Vernon (1724–1771) was a landowner and Member of Parliament (MP) in eighteenth century England.

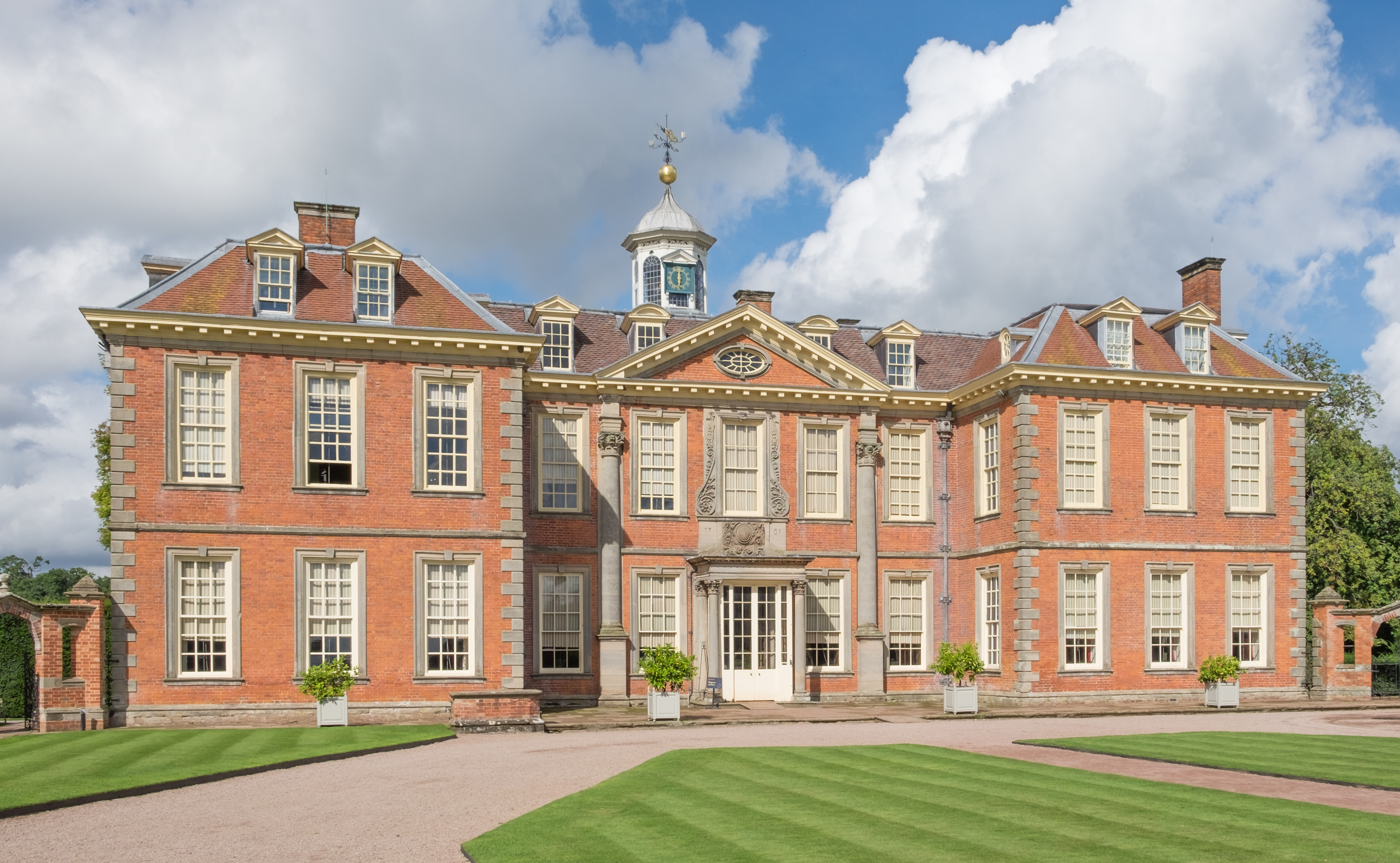
Hanbury Hall

He was the only son of Bowater Vernon (1683–1735), who had inherited Hanbury Hall, Worcestershire and large estates in Hanbury and elsewhere from his second cousin Thomas Vernon, who had died childless. Thomas was brought up in London in the family home in New Bond Street, and was only 11 when his father died.

After a spell at University College, Oxford, he was elected as an MP for the Worcester constituency in 1746 to fill the vacancy created by the death of Thomas Winnington. He continued to represent Worcester till 1761.

Vernon married Emma (1711–77), daughter of Vice Admiral Charles Cornwall of Berrington in Herefordshire. It seems he first married her in the Mayfair Chapel, notorious for conducting clandestine marriages, and perhaps went through a second marriage when it became clear that a record of the first was not properly kept. No record of either marriage, of the christening of either of his children, Emma (1756–1818) or Thomas (born and died 1754), survives.

Thomas was regarded as more sensible than his profligate father Bowater, and spent the last part of his life managing the family estates which stretched to nearly 10,000 acres (40 km²) in Hanbury, Dodderhill, Feckenham and Shrawley in Worcestershire, and in Shropshire and Warwickshire. He died suddenly in December 1771, and left as his heir his only surviving child Emma, who, in 1776, married Henry Cecil, later Earl, then Marquis, of Exeter.

Parliament of Great Britain
Preceded by Thomas Winnington; Sir Henry Harpur	Member of Parliament for Worcester; 1746–1761; With: Sir Henry Harpur 1746–47; Thomas Geers Winford 1747-48; Robert Tracy 1748-54; Henry Crabb-Boulton 1754-61	Succeeded by John Walsh; Henry Crabb-Boulton
