= Robert Tracy (MP) =

English politician (died 1767)

Robert Tracy (1706? – 28 September 1767) of Stanway House, nr. Tewkesbury, Gloucestershire was an English Member of Parliament.

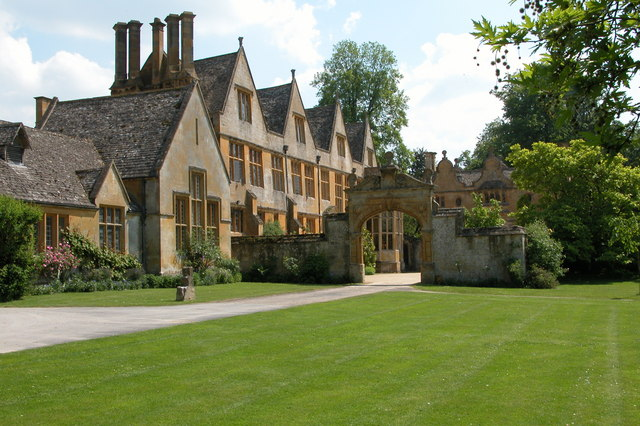
Stanway House, Gloucestershire - seat of the Tracy family

He was born the eldest son of John Tracy of Stanway and educated at New College, Oxford (1724). He succeeded his father in 1735.

He entered Parliament in 1734 as the member for Tewkesbury, sitting until 1741. He was afterwards elected in 1748 to represent Worcester until 1754.

In 1734 he became a trustee and common councilman for the newly formed colony of Georgia on the east coast of America. He was active in persuading Robert Walpole to release more funds for the colony.

He died in 1767. He had married in 1735 Anna Maria, the daughter of Sir Roger Hudson, a director of South Sea Company. They had no children. The Stanway estate passed to his niece Henrietta Keck, daughter of his brother Anthony Tracy (who had changed his surname to Keck). Henrietta changed her surname to Tracy and later married to Edward Devereux, 12th Viscount Hereford.

== See also ==
- Trustees for the Establishment of the Colony of Georgia in America

Parliament of Great Britain
Preceded by Viscount Gage; George Reade	Member of Parliament for Tewkesbury; 1734–1741; With: Viscount Gage	Succeeded by Viscount Gage; John Martin
Preceded by Thomas Vernon; Thomas Geers Winford	Member of Parliament for Worcester; 1748–1754; With: Thomas Vernon	Succeeded by Thomas Vernon; Henry Crabb-Boulton
