= Sir Thomas Morgan, 3rd Baronet =

British landowner and politician

Sir Thomas Morgan, 3rd Baronet (c. 1685–1716) was a British landowner and politician who sat in the House of Commons from 1712 to 1716.

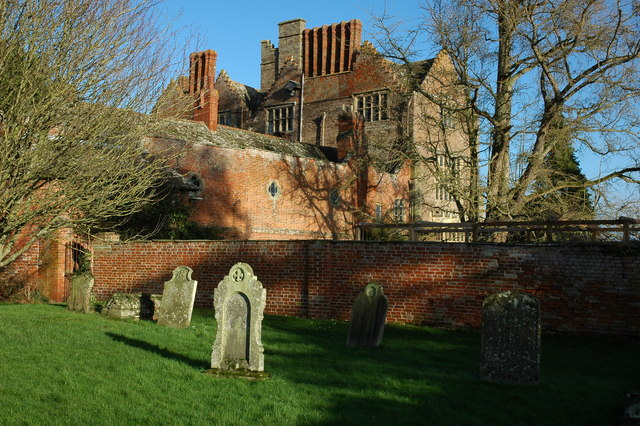
Kinnersley Castle, 2007

Morgan was born about 1685, the only son. of Sir John Morgan, 2nd Baronet of Kinnersley Castle and his wife Hester Price, daughter of James Price of Pilleth, Radnorshire. In February 1693, he succeeded to the estates and baronetcy of his father. He. married Anne Roydhouse, daughter. of John Roydhouse of London in about 1709.

Morgan's father had in 1681 been MP for New Radnor, where he had acquired estates through his wife, and subsequently for Herefordshire and he actively tried to thwart the ambitions of the Foley, Harley and Brydges families. Morgan's uncle James followed in his footsteps and used his nephew Thomas to challenge the Harleys and Brydges at Hereford in the 1708 and 1710 general elections. Morgan was unsuccessful in these elections, but then came to an agreement with the other families and was returned unopposed with their support as Member of Parliament for Herefordshire at a by-election on 30 July 1712. He was returned unopposed as a Tory at the 1713 general election and at the 1715 general election.

Morgan died on 4 December 1716. His only child, John, succeeded to the baronetcy.

Parliament of Great Britain
Preceded by The Viscount Scudamore; John Prise	Member of Parliament for Herefordshire; 1712– 1716; With: The Viscount Scudamore; Richard Hopton	Succeeded by Richard Hopton; Sir Hungerford Hoskyns, Bt
Baronetage of England
Preceded by John Morgan	Baronet (of Langattock); 1693-1716	Succeeded by John Morgan
