= Sir Henry Harpur, 5th Baronet =

English baronet and politician

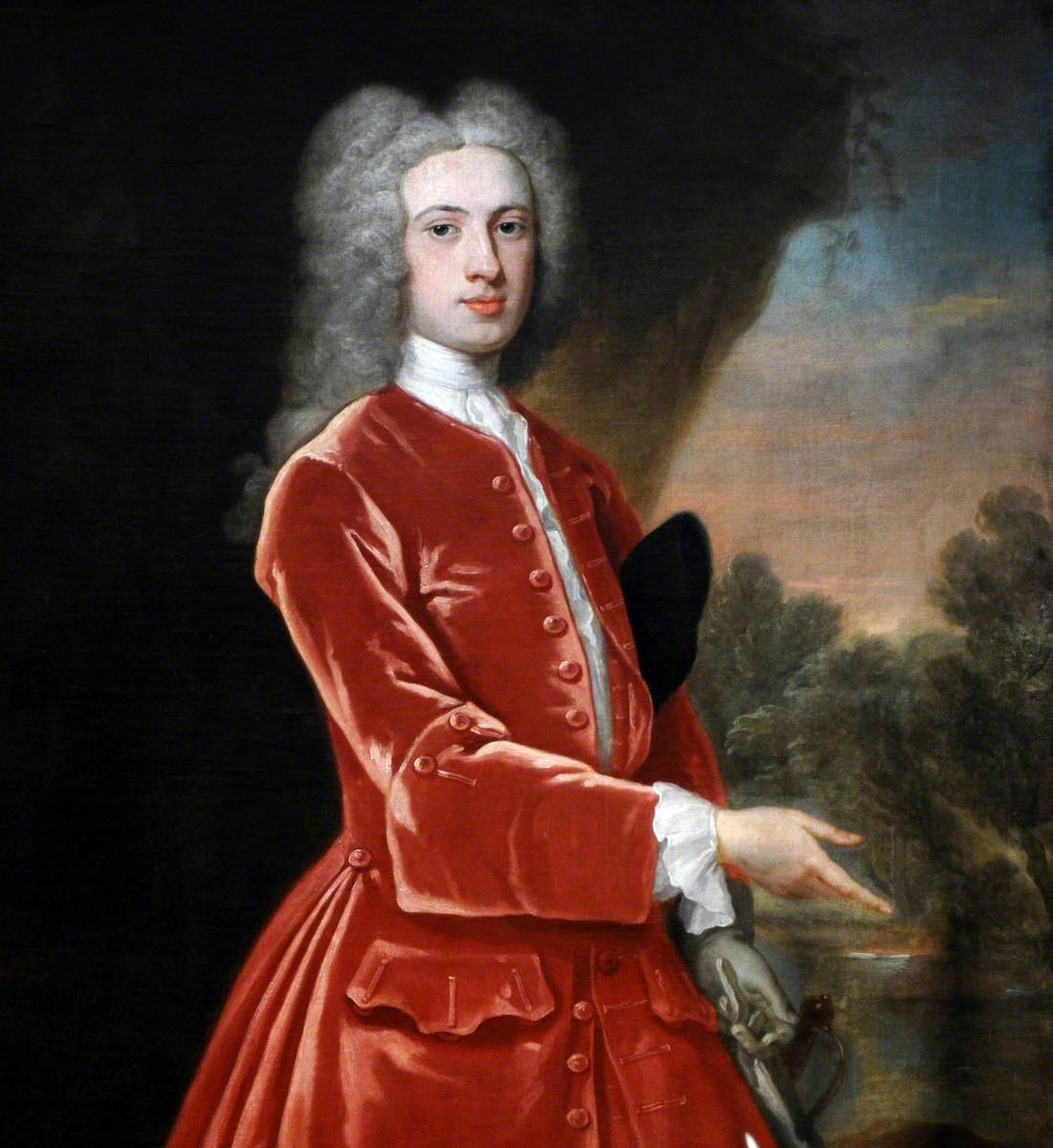

Member of the British Parliament for Worcester
- In office 1744–1747

Member of the British Parliament for Tamworth
- In office 1747–1748

Personal details
- Born: 24 June 1708
- Died: 7 June 1748 (aged 39)
- Spouse: Caroline Manners

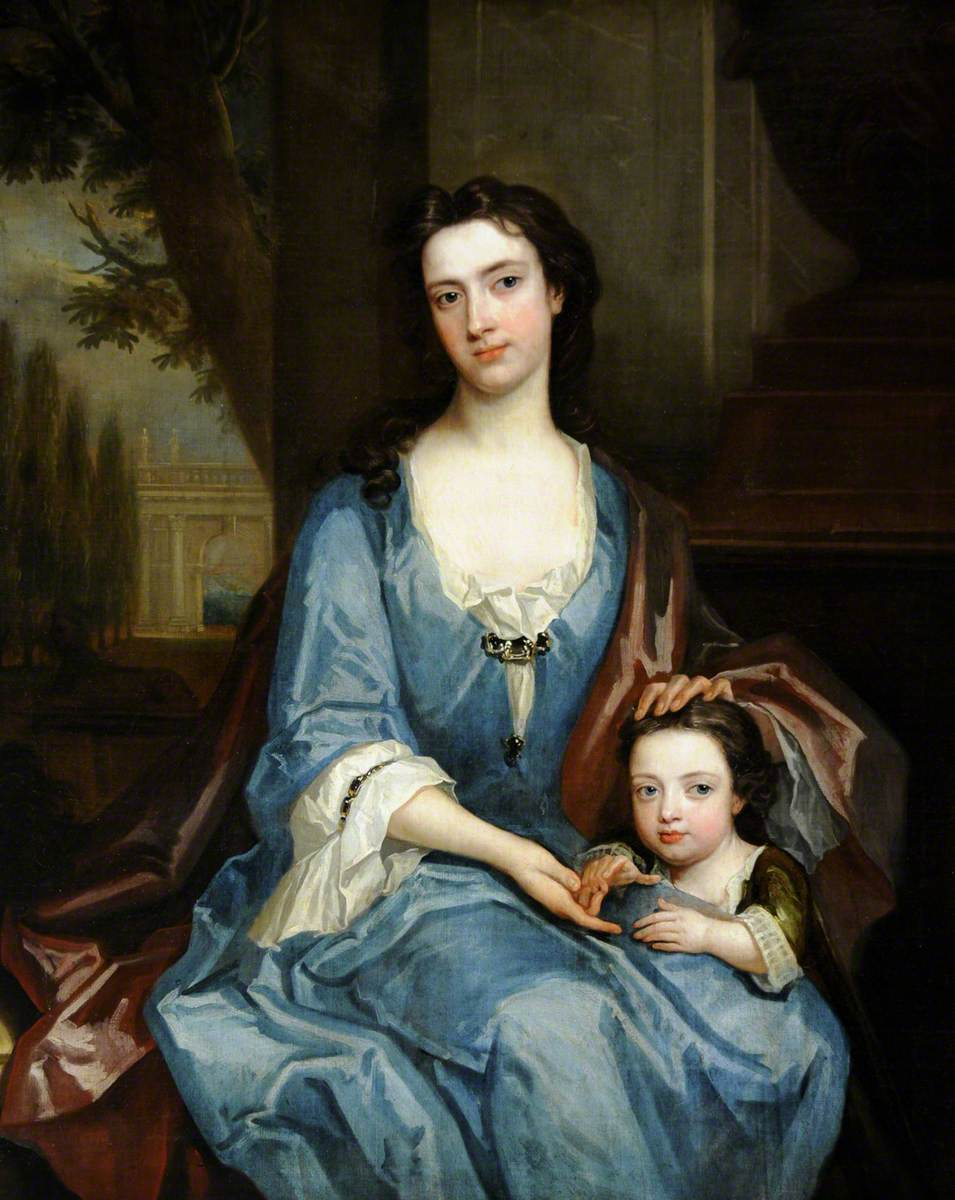
his mother Catherine Crewe (1682–1745), Lady Harpur

Sir Henry Harpur, 5th Baronet (24 June 1708 – 7 June 1748) was an English baronet and politician.

He was the oldest son of Sir John Harpur, 4th Baronet, of Calke Abbey, and his wife Catherine, daughter of Thomas Crew, 2nd Baron Crew. He was educated at Brasenose College, Oxford.

Harpur was a Tory Member of Parliament (MP) for Worcester from 1744 to 1747, and for Tamworth from 1747 until his death in 1748, aged 40.

On 2 October 1734, Harpur married Lady Caroline Manners (died 10 November 1769), daughter of the Duke of Rutland. He was succeeded in the baronetcy by his second but eldest surviving son Henry (c.1739–1789).

His daughter Caroline married the Scottish MP Adam Hay. In 1753, his widow, Lady Caroline, married Sir Robert Burdett, 4th Baronet.

Parliament of Great Britain
Preceded by Thomas Winnington; Samuel Sandys	Member of Parliament for Worcester; 1744 – 1747; With: Thomas Winnington to 1746; Thomas Vernon from 1746	Succeeded by Thomas Vernon; Thomas Geers Winford
Preceded by Lord John Philip Sackville; Charles Cotes	Member of Parliament for Tamworth; 1747 – 1748; With: Hon. Thomas Villiers	Succeeded by Hon. Thomas Villiers; Sir Robert Burdett
Baronetage of England
Preceded by John Harpur	Baronet (of Calke Abbey); 1748 – 1789	Succeeded by Henry Harpur
