= Sir Hungerford Hoskyns, 4th Baronet =

Coat of arms of Sir Hungerford Hoskyns, 4th Baronet

Crest
Out of a ducal coronet a lion’s head erased Or with flames of fire out of his mouth Proper crowned Or.
Escutcheon
Per pale Gules and Azure a chevron between three lions rampant Or.
Motto
Vincula Da Linguae Vel Tibi Lingua Dabit (Bind The Tongue Or The Tongue Will Thee)

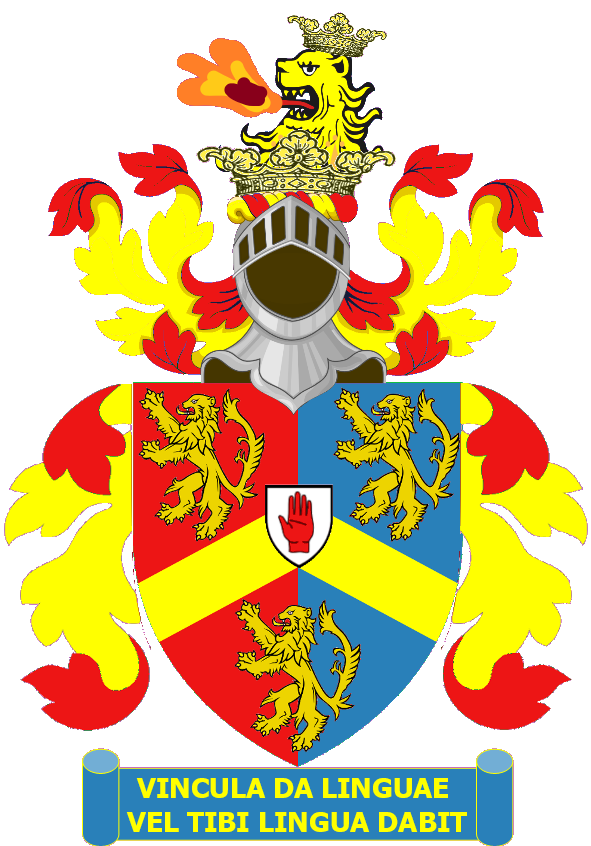
Achievement of arms

Sir Hungerford Hoskyns, 4th Baronet (c. 1677–1767) was a British army officer and politician who sat in the House of Commons from 1717 to 1722.

Hoskyns was the second son of Sir John Hoskyns, 2nd Baronet MP of Harewood Park, Herefordshire and his wife Jane, Lowe, daughter of Sir Gabriel Lowe of Newark, Gloucestershire. He was admitted at Middle Temple in 1701. He joined the army during the war of the Spanish succession and was a Cornet in the 7th Dragoon Guards in 1705, lieutenant in 1708 and a lieutenant in the 3rd Hussars in 1709. He resigned from the army when he succeeded his brother in the baronetcy on 17 December 1711 and inherited the family estates. He married, in. 1716, Mary Leigh, daughter of Theophilus Leigh of Adlestrop, Gloucestershire, who was niece of James Brydges, 1st Duke of Chandos.

Hoskyns was returned unopposed as Member of Parliament for Herefordshire at a by-election 6 March 1717. He was defeated at the 1722 general election as a result of his own tactlessness and unsubstantiated gossip. After his defeat he asked Chandos for financial help, but was refused on account of the losses Chandos had sustained in the South Sea Bubble. Hoskyns never stood for Parliament again.

He was one of the original backers of the Royal Academy of Music, establishing a London opera company which commissioned numerous works from Handel, Bononcini and others.

Hoskyns died at the age of 90 on 21 December 1767. He had two sons and two daughters and was succeeded in the baronetcy by his son Chandos.

Parliament of Great Britain
Preceded by Richard Hopton; Sir Thomas Morgan, Bt	Member of Parliament for Herefordshire; 1717–1722; With: Richard Hopton	Succeeded by Velters Cornewall; Sir Edward Goodere, Bt
Baronetage of Nova Scotia
Preceded by Bennet Hoskyns	Baronet (of Harewood); 1711-1767	Succeeded by Chandos Hoskyns
