= Cooper Willyams =

Clergyman and a British artist

- Born: June 1762
- Died: 17 July 1816 (aged 54); Russell Square, London
- Education: Emmanuel College, Cambridge

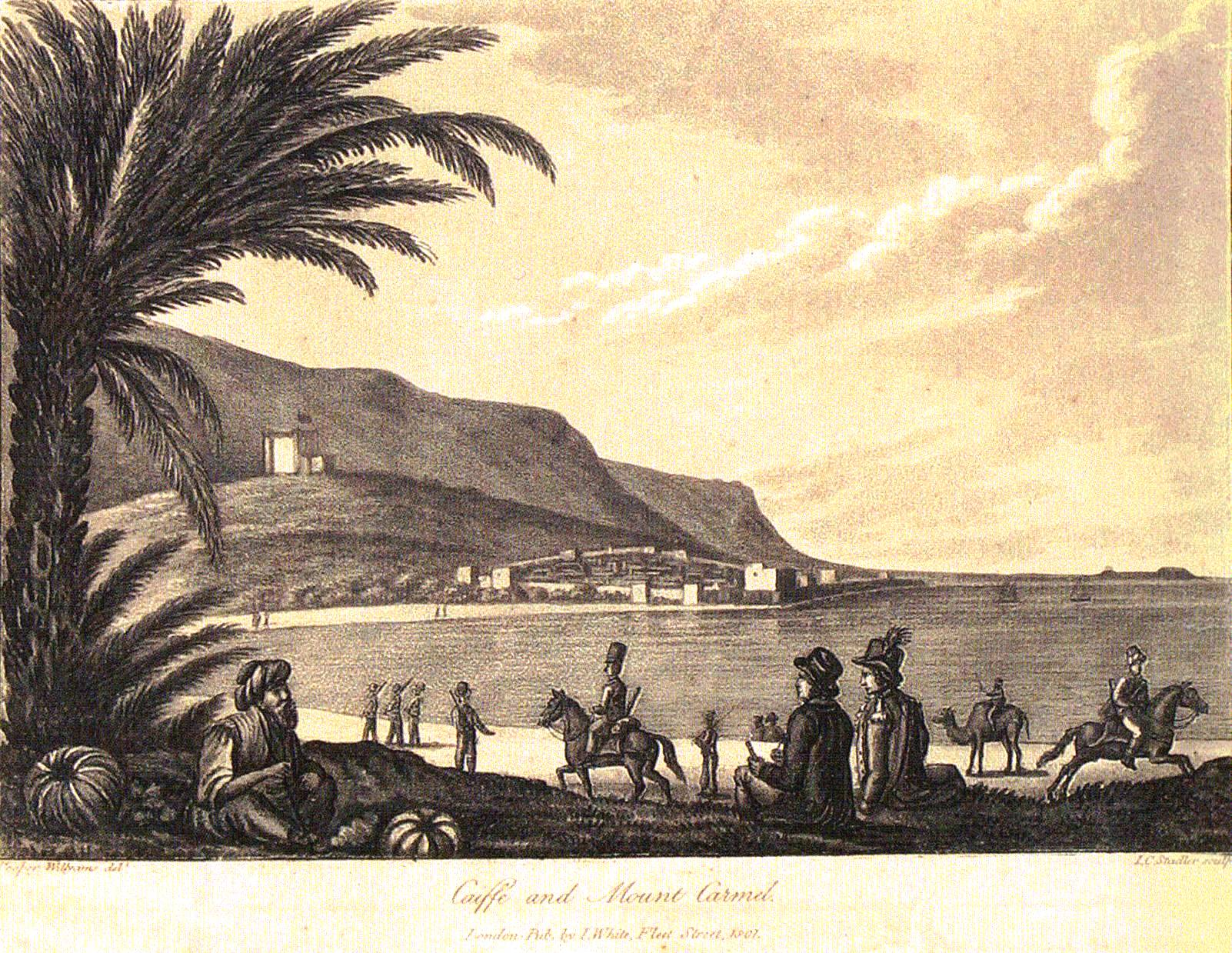
El Burg and Haifa in an 1801 Copper engraving by Willyams

The Rev. Cooper Willyams (June 1762 – 17 July 1816) was a clergyman and a British artist.

== Biography ==
Willyams was probably born in Plaistow House in Essex. His father was a commander in the Royal Navy and his maternal grandfather was Captain Samuel Goodere who had been hanged for fratricide. Willyams was in France in 1784 when he also graduated from Emmanuel College, Cambridge. He obtained a master's degree from the same college in 1789 and in 1792 first revealed his artistic skills in A History of Sudeley Castle.

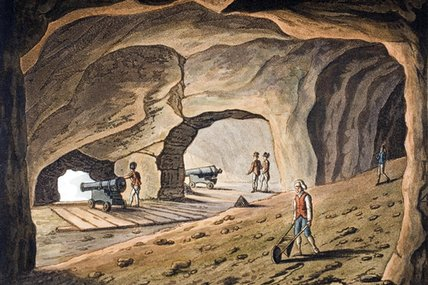
Inside the rock a gallery (inside the Rock of Gibraltar) by Willyams

In 1793, he enlisted as chaplain on HMS Boyne for its journey to the West Indies. In command were Lieutenant-General Sir Charles Grey and Vice Admiral Sir John Jervis. The crew were ravaged by yellow fever but managed to get the French to surrender at Fort St. Charles in Guadeloupe in the following year.

Willyams became chaplain to John Jervis, Earl St Vincent in 1797 and the following year chaplain of HMS Swiftsure captained by Benjamin Hallowell Carew, of Nelson's squadron. Swiftsure was at the Battle of the Nile and Willyams published an account. His landscapes of Egypt, Palestine, Greece, Italy, Minorca, and Gibraltar were posthumously published.

In 1801 he married Elizabeth Rebecca Snell, and by 1806 had an income of 1,000 pounds, being appointed to the rectories of Kingston and of Stourmouth (at least partially due to Earl St Vincent). Willyams died in Russell Square in 1816.
