= Samuel Goodere =

Royal Navy captain & murderer (1687–1741)

Arms of Goodere: Gules, a fess between two chevrons vair

Samuel Goodere (1687–1741) was a captain in the British Royal Navy, who was the third son of Sir Edward Goodere, 1st Baronet. He was convicted and hanged at Bristol for the murder of his elder brother, Sir John Dineley Goodere, 2nd Baronet, in 1741.

== Early life ==
Samuel Goodere's mother, Eleanor Goodere (née Dineley), was the daughter and heiress of Sir Edward Dineley of Charlton, Worcestershire, and the granddaughter of Lewis Watson, 1st Baron Rockingham. He had several brothers, the eldest of whom was killed in a duel. On the death of Sir Edward Dineley, the next eldest surviving brother, John, inherited the extensive Dineley estate.

Sir Edward Dineley's Will made bequests to his grandsons George Goodere, Samuel Goodere and Henry Goodere, and also John Goodere. Since the first born Goodere grandson had been killed before this Will was drawn up he is not named in the Will which is dated 12 November 1706 and bears a codicil. Sir Edward Dineley's Will stipulated that grandson John Goodere's first born son "of his body" should in turn inherit, or if John's first born son died, then the second son born of John's body should inherit. If John had no sons, his brother George Goodere and George's son should inherit. Should John and George fail to produce a male heir "of their bodies," then Samuel and his first born son would be next in line to inherit the bulk of the Dineley Estate. By the time of the death of John's son and then John himself his brother George should have inherited but he had either died or failed to have a son, therefore Samuel's son Edward (a lunatic) should have inherited the fortune, with Samuel's second born son John (Edward's twin) being next in line. Sir Edward Dineley's grandson John Goodere broke the terms of the 1706 Will by leaving his Estate to his sister Eleanor Foote's son.

John and Samuel Goodere both served as Mayors of Evesham. Their solicitor friend, Jarrett Smith, was unwittingly involved in the plot by Samuel to get rid of his brother John.

== Naval career ==
Samuel entered the navy in 1705 as a volunteer on board HMS Ipswich, with Captain Kirktowne, and served in a subordinate rank and afterwards as a lieutenant through the War of the Spanish Succession. On 12 January 1719 was appointed first lieutenant of HMS Preston with Captain Robert Johnson. Both Goodere and Johnson transferred to HMS Weymouth on 28 February 1719, and saw service in operations on the north coast of Spain in mid-1719. Later that year, on 6 November 1719, again with Johnson, he transferred to HMS Deptford. A few weeks later, however, Johnson preferred a charge of misconduct against Goodere, alleging that an attack on San Sebastián on 23 June had failed as a consequence of Goodere's actions. Goodere was tried by court-martial on 24 December 1719, was found guilty of "having been very much wanting in the performance of his duty", and was dismissed from his ship, which, in time of peace, was equivalent to being dismissed from the service.

In the opinion of John Knox Laughton, it is doubtful whether Goodere served again at sea until November 1733, when he was posted to HMS Antelope for a brief period of two weeks "apparently on some electioneering job" rather than as an active officer. He may have been living with his father, now nearing 80, who was on bad terms with his eldest surviving son, John. John was described as "rough, uncouth, and of no education". Samuel was also on bad terms with his brother; and these became worse when John, who had divorced his wife for adultery, found that she too was supported against him by Samuel. On the death of their father Sir Edward Goodere on 29 March 1739, John inherited the baronetcy, but a share of the Goodere estate was left to Samuel. John thought Samuel's share was too generous, while Samuel thought it too little. The brothers quarrelled, and John, joining with his son who was of age, cut off the entail (bequest). Shortly after, his son died, and John announced his intention of leaving the property to one of the sons of his sister Eleanor, the mother of Samuel Foote the comedian.

== Murders his brother ==
In November 1740, Samuel Goodere was appointed to the command of HMS Ruby, then lying off Bristol. On Sunday, 18 January 1741, Samuel was on shore and learned that his brother, Sir John, who was on his way to Bath in the hope of curing his ill health, was dining with an attorney in the city named Jarrett Smith. Samuel sent a note to Smith, saying that, having heard his brother was there, he would be glad to meet him if Smith would allow him to come in. Accordingly, in the evening he went to Smith's house, and the two brothers smoked and drank together, (John declined alcohol and would take only water) and to all appearance made up their quarrel. But, as John was walking towards his lodgings, he was seized by Samuel's orders, carried down to the King's Dock, rowed out to the man o' war Ruby, and confined in a spare cabin. Goodere told the men on deck to ignore Sir John's cries for help, as he was out of his mind, and would have to be watched to prevent his attempting his own life. Three men were chosen to attend the prisoner, and these three men, after being well primed with brandy, and on the promise of large rewards, went into the cabin early next morning (19 January 1741), and strangled Sir John with a rope while Samuel stood sentry at the door with a drawn sword to prevent any interference. A man and his wife in the adjoining cabin had heard and witnessed through gaps in the ship's timbers part of what had occurred. Goodere had apparently intended to put to sea at once, but Smith became suspicious and having had information the previous night that a gentleman resembling his guest had been taken prisoner on board the Ruby, applied to the mayor for an investigation. Goodere and his accomplices were apprehended. All four were tried on 26 March, found guilty, and sentenced to death. They were hanged on 15 April 1741.

His body was sent for anatomical dissection, but was afterwards interred with his ancestors at Hereford.

Papers relating to the murder and trial are held at Bristol Archives (Ref. 14754) (online catalogue).

== Family ==
Samuel had a daughter Eleanor Goodere born at Shoulden, Kent (who married William Wyborn). He later married a widow, Elizabeth Watts of Monmouthshire in or before 1729, and by her left three daughters and twin sons. Of the daughters two died unmarried; the third, Anne, married John Willyams, a commander in the navy, and was the mother of the Rev. Cooper Willyams. The eldest of the twin sons, Edward, who inherited the baronetcy on his father's execution, died a lunatic and unmarried in March 1761 at Clapton, London. The other, John, died in 1809 at Windsor Castle where he lived as "one of the Poor Knights of Windsor".

== Titles and styles ==
Although apparently entitled to inherit the baronetcy from his brother, he did not assume the title, and was referred to as "Mr Goodere" throughout his trial. Ralph Bigland, in his manuscript collections in the College of Arms, wrote that Goodere's sons Edward and John succeeded their murdered uncle rather than their father. But Burke thought that the baronetcy descended to Samuel and to his sons after him. In his Baronetage of 1741, Arthur Collins wrote that the baronetcy was extinct, while Thomas Wotton (Baronetage, 1771) thought the baronetcy was "attainted". Treadway Russell Nash in his History of Worcestershire (volume i, page 972) says that Sir Edward Dineley-Goodere succeeded his grandfather, which is definitely wrong since his uncle was certainly the second baronet. In the opinion of John Knox Laughton, it is probable "that the baronetcy became extinct in 1741, on the sentence of Samuel Goodere, though the twins may have been allowed the title by courtesy".

Baronetage of Great Britain
Preceded by John Dineley Goodere	Baronet (of Burhope); 1741	Succeeded by Edward Dineley-Goodere
