= Thomas Geers Winford =

British lawyer and Tory politician

Thomas Geers Winford (c.1697–1753), of Bridge Sollers, near Hereford, and Glasshampton, Worcestershire was a British lawyer and Tory politician who sat in the House of Commons between 1727 and 1748.

== Early life ==
Geers Winford was the eldest son of Timothy Geers of Bridge Sollers and his wife Mercy Winford, daughter of Henry Winford of Glasshampton, Worcestershire. He was admitted at Lincoln's Inn on 23 June 1719 and called to the bar in 1722.

== Career ==
Geers was returned as a Tory Member of Parliament for Hereford on a compromise at the 1727 British general election. He voted consistently with the Opposition and spoke occasionally. On 4 February 1730, he moved unsuccessfully for a vote of thanks to Dr. Samuel Croxall for his sermon preached at St. Margaret's, Westminster on the anniversary of the beheading of Charles I. This was based on the text "take the wicked from before the King and His throne shall be established as righteousness" and intended as an allusion to Walpole.

Geers did not stand at the 1734 British general election, but was returned in a contest for Hereford at the 1741 British general election, with his cousin, Edward Hopton. In about 1745 he became Town clerk of Worcester, retaining the post for the rest of his life. At the 1747 British general election he was returned in a contest for Worcester but was unseated on petition on 11 February 1748. Geers succeeded his father in 1750, but died three years later in 1753.

== Personal life ==
Geers married Sarah Lutwyche, third daughter of Thomas Lutwyche of Lutwyche Hall, Shropshire in April 1731 and, on his marriage, his uncle, Sir Thomas Cookes Winford, 2nd Baronet MP, gave him the estate of Glasshampton and Geers adopted the name of Winford. Together, Geers and Sarah were the parents of:

- Sarah Winford (d. 1805), who married Sambrooke Freeman of Fawley Court, Buckinghamshire.
- Harriet Winford, who died unmarried.

His uncle died without issue 19 January 1743, and the baronetcy became extinct. Geers himself died on 23 May 1753. Upon the death of his daughter Sarah in 1805, her estate passed to Sir John Geers Cottrell, 1st Baronet (son of Sir John Cottrell, Sheriff of Herefordshire and of Anne Geers, only daughter of John Geers of Garnons, Herefordshire).

Parliament of Great Britain
Preceded by Herbert Rudhale Westfaling; James Wallwyn	Member of Parliament for Hereford; 1727–1734; With: Marquess of Carnarvon	Succeeded by Thomas Foley; Sir John Morgan
Preceded by Thomas Foley; Sir John Morgan	Member of Parliament for Hereford; 1741–1747; With: Edward Cope Hopton	Succeeded by Lieutenant General Henry Cornewall; Daniel Leighton
Preceded by Thomas Vernon; Sir Henry Harpur	Member of Parliament for Worcester; 1747–1748; With: Thomas Vernon	Succeeded by Thomas Vernon; Robert Tracy
