= Sir John Dineley Goodere, 2nd Baronet =

British aristocrat & murder victim (c. 1680-1741)

Arms of Goodere: Gules, a fess between two chevrons vair

Sir John Dineley 2nd Baronet (c. 1680 – 1741) of Burhope/Burghope House in the parish of Wellington Herefordshire, was a British aristocrat and murder victim.

== Early life ==
He was born John Goodere in about 1680, the second son, and eventual heir, of Sir Edward Goodere, 1st Baronet. His mother, Helen née Dineley, was the granddaughter of Lewis Watson, 1st Baron Rockingham.

== Career ==
He embarked on a career at sea in the merchant navy, and was a volunteer on HMS Diamond in 1708. In that year, or shortly after, he inherited the Charlton, Worcestershire, estate of his maternal ancestors, and took their name of Dineley, instead of that of Goodere.

== Personal life ==
In or before 1720, he married Mary Lawford, but he divorced her "for adultery with Sir John Jasson"

== Murder and aftermath ==
Sir John had long been on bad terms with his younger brother Samuel Goodere, and on 17 January 1741 he was strangled at his brother's direction on his brother's ship HMS Ruby off Bristol.

On behalf of an alleged surviving son, his divorced wife set up a fraudulent claim (as his widow), which failed. His brother, and his two accomplices, were hanged for murder on 15 April 1741. The baronetcy was inherited by Samuel's eldest son Edward who inherited the Dineley estate.

Baronetage of Great Britain
Preceded by Aubrey McMahon	Baronet (of Burhope); 1739–1741	Succeeded by Samuel Goodere
