= Paula Goodyer =

Australian journalist

Paula Goodyer (born 1947) is a Walkley Award winning Australian freelance journalist, author and health writer.

Goodyer is a former Fairfax staff journalist and was the health editor of Cleo magazine. She currently writes a blog on The Sydney Morning Herald site, Chew on this.

== Awards ==
- 1992 – Walkley Award (Print) – Best Magazine Story, Cleo Magazine

== Bibliography ==
- BodyGuard Sydney:ABC Books, 2003
- Kids & Drugs Sydney:Allen and Unwin,1998
