= HMS Ruby (1708) =

Ship of the line of the Royal Navy

History

Great Britain
- Name: HMS Ruby
- Builder: Allin, Deptford Dockyard
- Launched: 25 March 1708
- Renamed: HMS Mermaid, 1744
- Fate: Sold, 1748

General characteristics
- Class & type: 1706 Establishment 50-gun fourth rate ship of the line
- Tons burthen: 707 bm
- Length: 130 ft (39.6 m) (gundeck)
- Beam: 35 ft (10.7 m)
- Depth of hold: 14 ft (4.3 m)
- Propulsion: Sails
- Sail plan: Full-rigged ship
- Armament: 50 guns: Gundeck: 22 × 18-pdrs; Upper gundeck: 22 × 9-pdrs; Quarterdeck: 4 × 6-pdrs; Forecastle: 2 × 6-pdrs

HMS Ruby was a 50-gun fourth rate ship of the line of the Royal Navy, built by Joseph Allin the elder at Deptford Dockyard to the 1706 Establishment, and launched on 25 March 1708.

She achieved an unwelcome notoriety in March 1741 when her captain, Samuel Goodere, was convicted of murder at Bristol and subsequently hanged; he had enticed his elder brother, Sir John Dineley Goodere, 2nd Baronet, on board, and had caused him to be strangled in the purser's cabin.

Ruby was renamed HMS Mermaid in 1744, and was sold out of the service in 1748.
