= George Goodyear (footballer) =

English footballer (1916–2001)

Personal information
- Full name: George William Goodyear
- Date of birth: 5 July 1916
- Place of birth: Luton, England
- Date of death: 16 July 2001 (aged 85)
- Place of death: Bedford, England
- Position: Wing half

Senior career*
Years	Team	Apps	(Gls)
–1938	Hitchin Town		
1938–1947	Luton Town	10	(0)
1947–1949	Southend United	59	(1)
- Crystal Palace
- Biggleswade Town
- * Club domestic league appearances and goals

George William Goodyear (5 July 1916 – 16 July 2001) was an English professional footballer who played in the Football League for Southend United and Luton Town as a wing half.

== Career statistics ==
Appearances and goals by club, season and competition
Club	Season	League			FA Cup		Total	
Club	Season	Division	Apps	Goals	Apps	Goals	Apps	Goals
Luton Town	1946–47	Second Division	10	0	2	0	12	0
Career total			10	0	2	0	12	0
