= George Goodyear =

American clergyman and politician (1801–1884)

Personal details
- Born: December 9, 1801 Hamden, Connecticut, U.S.
- Died: November 18, 1884 (aged 82) Temple, New Hampshire, U.S.
- Spouse(s): Elizabeth Anderson (m. 1830; died 1844) Roxana Rand (m. 1844)
- Children: 3
- Education: Yale University
- Occupation: Politician, clergyman

George Goodyear (December 9, 1801 – November 18, 1884) was an American clergyman and politician. He was born in Hamden, Connecticut, December 9, 1801.

He graduated from Yale College in 1824. He attended Yale Divinity School for three years, and served as a pastor of the Orthodox Congregational Denomination.

He married Elizabeth Anderson of Gaines, New York, daughter of Robert Anderson, in 1830. His wife died in February 1844, and he then married Roxana Rand, daughter of Deacon L. S. Rand of Townshend, Vermont, on December 8, 1844. Roxana survived him, along with three children by his first marriage. In 1855 he received a call to become pastor in Temple, New Hampshire, where he was installed on April 25, 1855. He also later served as a member of the New Hampshire legislature from Temple.

He died in Temple, New Hampshire, of tuberculosis on November 18, 1884.
