= Robin Goodyer =

English cricketer (born 1951)

Robin Goodyer (born 28 October 1951) was an English cricketer. He was a right-handed batsman and wicket-keeper who played for Oxfordshire. He was born in Ventnor, Isle of Wight.

Goodyer made a single List A appearance for the side, during the 1975 season, against Cornwall. He did not bat or bowl in the match, but took a single catch.

Goodyer made a single Minor Counties Championship appearance the following season.
