= Hanoverian Tory =

British political group

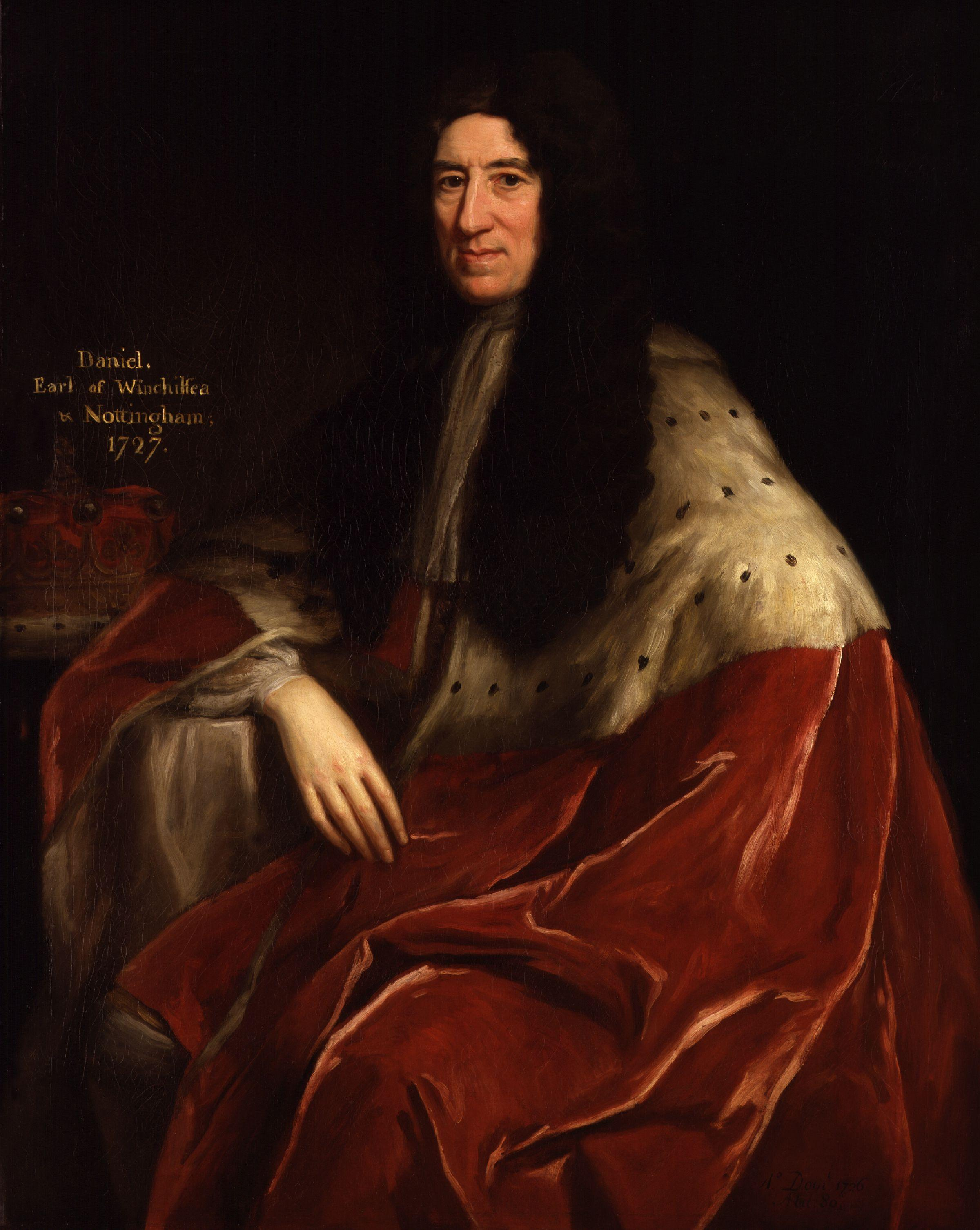
The Earl of Nottingham, one of the most prominent Hanoverian Tories in 1714

Hanoverian Tories were Tory supporters of the Hanoverian Succession of 1714. At the time many Tories favoured the exiled Jacobite James Francis Edward Stuart to take the British and Irish thrones, while their arch rivals the Whigs supported the candidacy of George, Elector of Hanover.

During the Tory-dominated Harley ministry (1710–1714), senior cabinet ministers led by Henry St. John intended to secure the throne for James. In preparation, army officers suspected of being pro-Hanover were purged from the service. Both Hanoverian Whigs and Hanoverian Tories were targeted. In the matter of the ongoing War of Spanish Succession, pro-war Whigs joined forces with the Hanoverian Tories under the banner "No Peace Without Spain", opposing the Treaty of Utrecht. While Queen Anne was approaching her death in 1714, the Hanoverian Tories worked with Whigs led by General James Stanhope to secure the country for George. The Hanoverian Succession followed on relatively peacefully following Anne's death in August 1714, although George's coronation did provoke riots across the country.

Despite George I's distrust of the Tories, the first government of the new reign included a number of Hanoverian Tories. After the failed 1715 Jacobite Uprising, the Duke of Argyll (a Whig with strong connections with the Hanoverian Tories) was replaced as army commander in Scotland due to his supposedly insufficient loyalty. During the Whig Oligarchy, the Tories were in opposition for several decades, and the name was often used as a synonym for Jacobite by their rivals. In 1727, when George I died, the Hanoverian Tories again supported the succession of his son George II rather than the continued claims of James. In 1730 they were still active as a faction when Spencer Compton tried to organise a coalition between them and the Patriot Whigs in order to replace the long-standing Prime Minister Robert Walpole.

== Background ==
Following the Act of Settlement of 1701, the throne was intended to pass to the House of Hanover following the death of Queen Anne. However during the Tory government of Robert Harley after 1710, serious consideration was given by senior cabinet ministers led by Henry St. John to secure the throne for James instead, supported by some High Tories in the Loyal Brotherhood and October Club. In preparation, army officers suspected of being pro-Hanover were purged from the service including both Whigs and Tories such as Henry Lumley. The Duke of Marlborough, former Captain General and a moderate Tory, went into exile on the continent following his dismissal in 1711.

Tied up with the ongoing debate about the future of the throne, was a dispute over the end of the War of Spanish Succession. Pro-war Whigs joined with Hanoverian Tories under the banner "No Peace Without Spain", opposing the Treaty of Utrecht. As Hanover was a key ally of Britain in this conflict, and resented what was regarded as this abandonment, it naturally led George to prefer the Whigs. In spite of having about forty members in the House of Commons in early 1714, these were very unpredictable and could not be completely relied on by the Whigs in their challenge to the Harley government.

== Hanoverian Succession ==
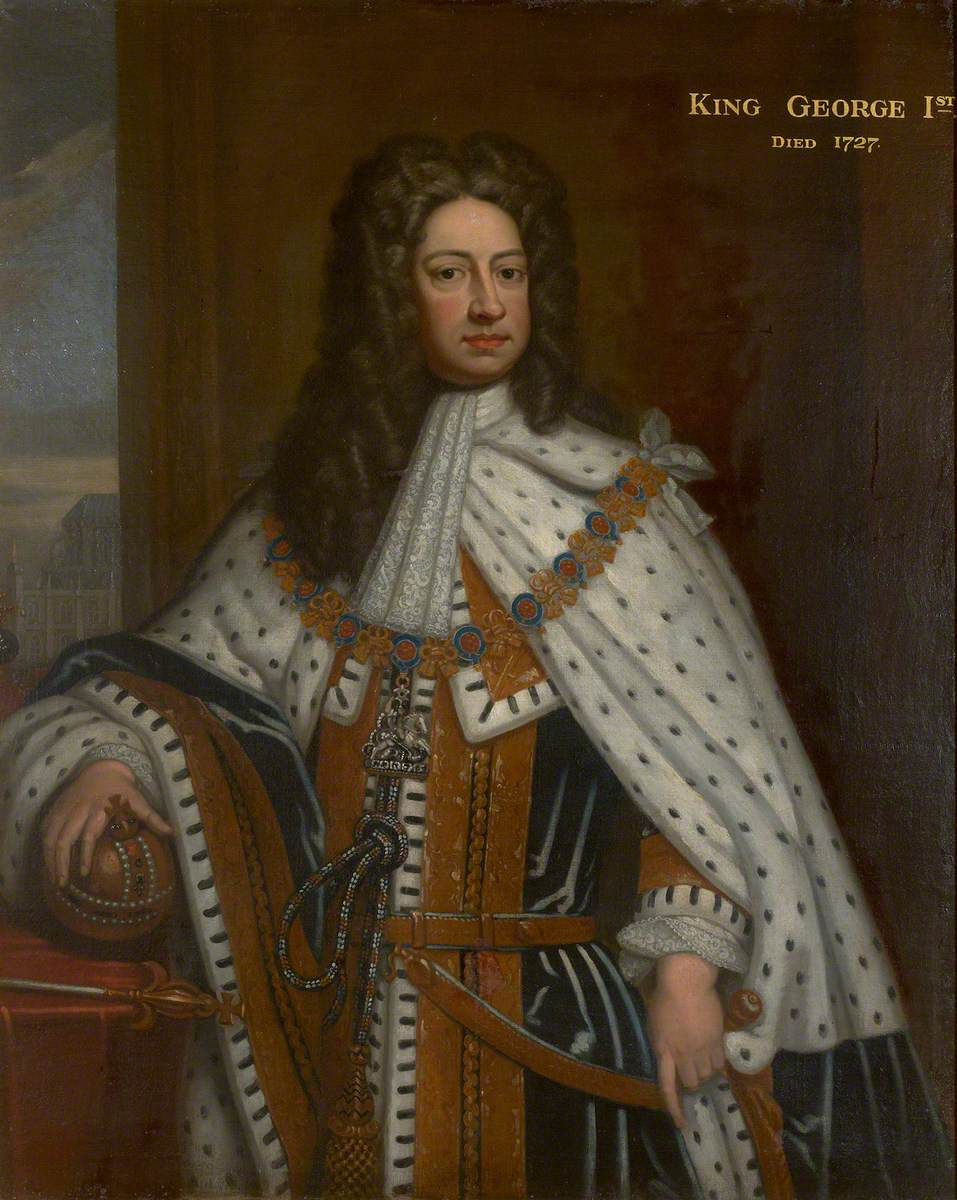
George I appointed several Hanoverian Tories in his first government, but they were soon pushed out as the Whig Ascendancy began.

As Anne grew increasingly weak in 1714, both Jacobites and pro-Hanoverians prepared to take measures to seize the throne if necessary by armed force. Hanoverian Tories worked with Whigs led by General James Stanhope to secure the country for George. In the event the Hanoverian Succession followed on relatively peacefully following Anne's death in August 1714, although George's coronation did provoke riots across the country which then continued into the following year. Whigs and Hanoverian Tories provided a solid bloc in Parliament to vote through the Succession. It has been suggested that many Tory figures wavered between the two factions at the Succession.

== Aftermath ==
Despite George I's distrust of the Tories, the first government of the new reign included Pro-Hanoverians such as Lord Nottingham. This continued after the failed 1715 Jacobite Uprising, although the Duke of Argyll a Whig with strong connections with the Hanoverian Tories was replaced as army commander in Scotland because it was considered he had been insuffienctly committed to defeating the Jacobites despite his victory at Sheriffmuir.

However, gradually the government began to be completely dominated by staunch Whigs, leading to the Whig Oligarchy. Tories were in opposition for several decades, and the name was often used as a synonym for Jacobite by their rivals. Nonetheless in 1727, when George I died, Hanoverian Tories again supported the succession of his son George II rather than the continued claims of James. In 1730 they were still active as a faction when Spencer Compton tried to organise a coalition between them and opposition Patriot Whigs in order to replace the long-standing Prime Minister Robert Walpole.

Hanoverian Tories were active in the attempts to acquit former leader Robert Harley during his impeachment trial in 1715 and subsequent imprisonment in the Tower of London. He was eventually acquitted in 1717.

== Notable figures ==
- John Churchill, 1st Duke of Marlborough, former Captain-General
- Daniel Finch, 2nd Earl of Nottingham, Cabinet Minister
- Sir Thomas Hanmer, 4th Baronet, Speaker of the House of Commons
- William Bromley, Speaker and Cabinet Minister
- Henry Lumley, General
- Charles Trelawny, General and politician
- Henry Withers, General and former MP
- Henry Paget, 1st Earl of Uxbridge, politician

== Bibliography ==
- Jeremy Black. British Politics and Foreign Policy, 1727-44. Ashgate Publishing, 2014.
- Eveline Cruickshanks. Ideology and conspiracy: aspects of Jacobitism, 1689-1759. John Donald, 1982.
- Andreas Gestrich & Michael Schaich. The Hanoverian Succession: Dynastic Politics and Monarchical Culture. Routledge, 2016.
- Geoffrey Holmes. British Politics in the Age of Anne. A&C Black, 1987.
