= Wellington, Herefordshire =

Village in Herefordshire, England

Coordinates: 52.12888°N 2.74059°W

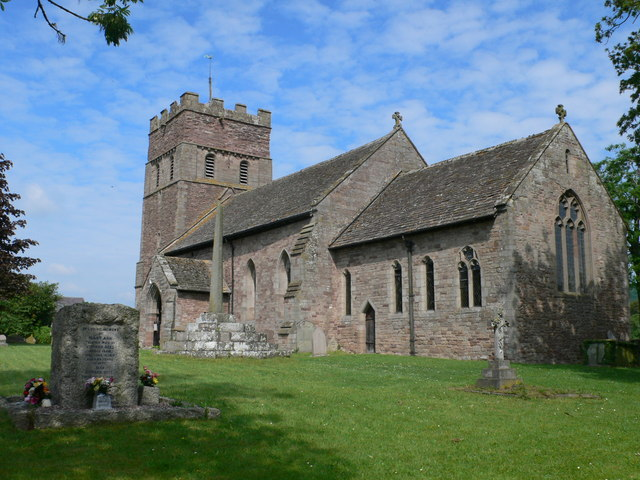
St Margaret of Antioch church

Wellington is a village and civil parish in Herefordshire, England at grid reference SO494481. The civil parish had a population of 1,005 in the 2011 census.

The village is sheltered by the wooded slopes of Dinmore Hill to the north, close to the A49 and roughly midway between Hereford and Leominster. Its half timbered 'black and white' houses mixed with later types of buildings in stone and brick give it a strong regional character. A ford through the Wellington Brook by the church is a unique and picturesque sight.

The local church is dedicated to St. Margaret of Antioch and is a grade I listed building.

The village is a compact settlement mentioned in the Domesday Book.

The community is enthusiastic and has recently built an attractive and very successful village shop with a post office and meeting room for hire. An enthusiastic group is mounting a bid to buy the village pub and restore it to success. Another group is developing a much needed children's play area on the sports field. Other groups are establishing accessible footpaths for disabled people.

Wellington Primary School is Ofsted rated good and has a current roll of 73 children. It is in association with the forward looking Leominster Primary.

The Wellington Social club hosts sporting events and is licensed.

Extensive playing fields behind the school offer two full size football pitches with flood lighting and stands with covered seating. Also three tennis courts and bowling green. The village has a football team — Wellington FC — which plays in the Hellenic League.

There are many local clubs and societies which meet in the Community Rooms run by the Wellington Community Association.

Wellington Parish Council meets monthly on the first Thursday.
