= Charlton, Worcestershire =

Village in Worcestershire, England

Coordinates: 52.108693°N 1.98771°W

Charlton
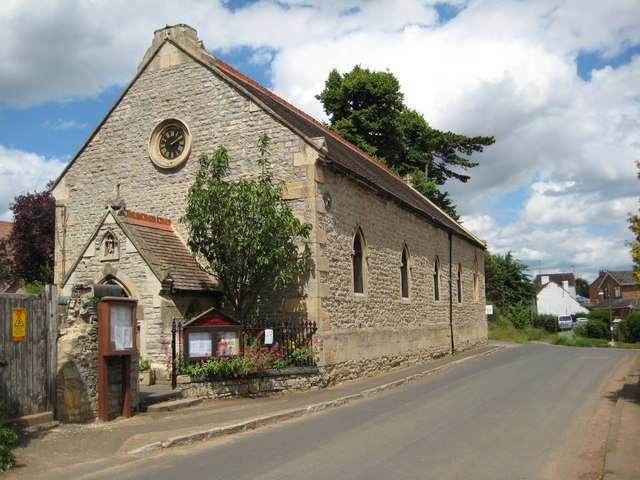
- Charlton Church

- Location within Worcestershire
- Population: 552 (2021 census)
- Language: English
  - London: 90 Miles (As the crow flies)
- Civil parish: Charlton
- District: Wychavon
- Shire county: Worcestershire
- Region: West Midlands
- Country: England
- Sovereign state: United Kingdom
- Post town: Pershore
- Postcode district: WR10
- Police: West Mercia
- Fire: Hereford and Worcester
- Ambulance: West Midlands
- UK Parliament: Droitwich and Evesham

Charlton is a village in the Wychavon district of the county of Worcestershire, England. During the 2007 United Kingdom floods, many homes were affected for the second time in a decade. Charlton lies between the River Avon and Bredon Hill. Evesham is 3 miles to the east, and Pershore 5 miles to the west, but its postal address is Pershore rather than Evesham. Fladbury and Cropthorne are its neighbouring villages, both within a mile Fladbury is just over the River Avon and Cropthorne up the hill.

The name Charlton derives from the Old English ceorltūn meaning 'settlement of the free peasants'.

== Manor ==
In 1240 William de Handsacre held Charlton Manor and in 1267–8 he was accused of carrying off the goods of Thomas de Arderne from this manor (presumably Arderne was a tenant). William did not appear to answer the plea, and the sheriff was commanded to take all his lands and tenements into the king's hands. William had evidently fallen under the king's displeasure before this time, for in 1266 he was granted a safe conduct coming to the king's court to stand his trial. However he must have received pardons as William paid a subsidy of 30s. at Cropthorne in 1280, and was holding the manor in 1292 and in 1299. Sir Simon Handsacre, possibly his son, is said to have been Lord of Charlton in 1331–2, and William de Handsacre was in possession in 1346. Another Sir Simon, who had succeeded the 1346 William, died before 1383–4, leaving only three daughters, Eleanor wife of Richard Dineley, Elizabeth wife of Roger Colmon (and afterwards of Peter de Melburn), and Isabel wife of Lawrence Frodley. Richard Dineley and Elizabeth were dealing with a third of the manor in 1386–7, and three years later the co-heirs conveyed the manor to trustees, evidently for the purpose of settling it on the Dineleys, to whom the whole afterwards passed until the middle of the 18th century. Notables include Edward Dynley (1600–1646), Lord of Charlton Manor, a Cavalier killed during the Civil War, and Sir Edward Dineley of Charlton, who was knighted in 1681 and served as Deputy Lieutenant for Worcestershire in 1682.

== Village Make-up ==
Along with neighbouring village Cropthorne, it shares a primary school and a pre school. The pre school is in Charlton behind the Church in the Old School Rooms, whereas Cropthorne and Charlton C of E First School is situated up in Cropthorne.

The Village has over 200 houses, and is roughly centred on the Green, which has Merrybrook (Now classified as a river) running through its centre.

The Gardener's Arms Pub is set just off the Green, and is now the main meeting point for the village following the closure of the local shop and postage stamp sized Post Office.

The village also has a cemetery and post box. It is also on the Worcester-Evesham 551 and 550 bus route, used by Children to get to and from Prince Henry's High School and Bredon Hill Academy.

== Events ==
Once a year the Charlton Fayre is held in the centre of the village. The village green is generally the hub of activities, with the pub playing a large part in the festivities.

The Gardener's Arms have over the past few years held and organised many special events such as the Help for Heroes event.

== Sports ==
Charlton does not strictly have any representative Sports teams currently. Formerly the Football team the Charlton Swifts used to be a very successful club in the local area, but this has not been so for over half a century.

Fladbury Athletic has a large base of Charlton residents and Charlton raised players, as well as using the Gardener's Arms as their post match venue.

The team plays its home games in Fladbury (hence its name), due to the fact there is no facilities in Charlton. Athletic have been in existence for five seasons and have been promoted twice in that time. They are currently competing in the Birdseye Sports Evesham Sunday League Division Two.

Charlton also has many of its inhabitant share the Sheppy facilities, in the neighboring village of Cropthorne.
