= The Epicure's Almanack =

The Epicure's Almanack; or, Calendar of Good Living, was a guide to eating establishments in London, written by Ralph Rylance and published by Longman in 1815. Given the poor reception of the initial printing, there was no effort to pull together any later edition. The book was republished by the British Library in 2013, with extensive commentary by Janet Ing Freeman.

== The Book ==
The Epicure's Almanack describes some 650 eating establishments in London and its then-surroundings as of 1815. Longman, its publisher, spent nearly £177 to print 750 copies of the first edition, and advertised heavily, but in the end fewer than 300 copies were sold; the remainder were pulped. It was advertised as being modelled on the Almanach des Gourmands, published in Paris between 1803 and 1812, but the claim seems untrue. In fact, it was pulled together from the notes of Rylance and collaborators as they visited a number of London establishments. Very few of these eateries have continued to the present day, and the book's primary interest is as an early-19th century description of London, its eateries, and its cuisine.

The book is organized into a main body and three shorter appendices:

- The Almanack proper, describing shops, pubs, taverns, and dining halls by geographic region, both within and around London of that day.
- The Review of Artists who Administer to Wants and Conveniences of the Table, which identifies new and useful implements for cooking, and which aims to improve British cuisine
- A review of London's best Markets.
- And finally an Alimentary Calendar, describing which foods are in season at any given time of year.

In the appendices, it is apparent that Ryler's interest is not merely to describe London's eating places, but to improve the quality of British cuisine. His Review of Artists begins with a telling quote:

"The proverb most frequently repeated by John Bull is, that 'God sends meat; but the Devil sends cooks'.... There is something uncharitable and indeed unjust in the reflection, for the whole system of English cookery is much inferior in economy, and variety of resources to either the French or the German.... [If] John Bull has any regard to his constitution, physically speaking, repeal some of the statutes of Elizabeth Raffald, and commence a fundamental reform in the lower house, commonly called the kitchen."

Rylance himself was an itinerant author, in and out of mental asylums, apparently due to manic depressive disorder; he died in a private asylum in 1834.

== Condiments of Regency London ==
The Almanack's Review of Artists who Administer to Wants and Conveniences of the Table, pages 272–273, provides detailed documentation of condiments available in Regency-era London "Italian warehouses":

Let us now pass from the subject of culinary apparatus to that of condiments.... As soups generally take the lead at table, we take the liberty of recommending vermicelli; that from Genoa is esteemed the best. The Anderina and Cagliari pastes (pastas) are excellent ingredients for thickening soups, and for converting veal-broth into delicious white soup. The flavour will be much improved by the addition of lean ham fried. For the convenience of those whom travel or business compels to dine hastily, there are tablets of portable soup to be had of various flavours, which dissolve quickly in hot water, and form an extemporaneous dish of the most nutritious kind.

For fish, the next article in succession, a great variety of materials for sauce present themselves: some, in the state of extracts, as essence of lobster, of anchovies, zoobditty mutch, and sauce royale; Japan soy, lemon-pickle, walnut and mushroom ketchups, oyster ketchup, and various articles prepared, so as to require only the admixture of melted butter.

For ragouts, hashes, and made dishes in general, as well as for fowls, a great choice of sauces presents itself. We may instance cavice sauce, Hanoverian sauce for game, Quin's sauce, camp sauce, Harvey's sauce, coratch, &c. Several curious flavoured vinegars may be said to belong to this department; such as red and white French vinegar, Tarragona, and garlic vinegar, cayenne and Chili vinegar. There are also kept essences of parsley, celery, mint, thyme, marjoram, sage, onion, &c., for flavouring soup. These essences are much preferable to the herbs themselves used after the common way in their dried state.

Of materials for puddings we notice millet, semolina, patna rice. Of cheeses we have the Parmesan, the gruyère, the chapsigre, and our famous English Stilton. That delicious and nutritive article, macaroni, forms, with grated cheese, a fine after-dish. Morells, foreign and English, truffles, dry, green, and preserved; mushrooms and champignons dried or in power; dried artichoke-bottoms, curry-powder, beans and lentils for making haricots; and that highly prized luxury, the sauer kraut....

== Surviving establishments ==
As of 2012, the following establishments listed in the Epicure's Almanack still exist in substantially the same form:

=== Central London ===
- The Seven Stars, No. 53 Carey Street
- The Bell (now the Old Bell), No. 96 Fleet Street
- The Cheshire Cheese (Ye Olde Cheshire Cheese), Wine Office Court, No. 145 Fleet Street
- The George and Vulture, George Yard
- Simpson's, Ball Court
- The Cock and Woolpack, No. 6 Finch Lane

=== Outer London ===
- The George, No. 77 Borough High Street, Southwark
- The George, No. 32 King Street, Twickenham
- The Green Man, Putney Heath
- The King's Arms, Hampton Court
- The Town of Ramsgate, No. 62 Wapping High Street
- The Spaniards, Hampstead Heath
- The Windmill, Clapham Common
- The Hand and Flower, No. 1 Hammersmith Road
- The George (now the George and Devonshire), No. 8 Burlington Lane, Chiswick
