= John Wilde (jurist) =

English lawyer and politician

John Wilde (or Wylde; 1590–1669) was an English lawyer and politician. As a serjeant-at-law he was referred to as Serjeant Wilde before he was appointed judge. He was a judge, chief baron of the exchequer, and member of the Council of State of the Commonwealth period.

== Early life ==
He was the son and heir of George Wylde of Worcester, The Harriots, Droitwich, and Kempsey, Worcestershire, serjeant-at-law, who also represented Droitwich in parliament, by his wife Frances, daughter of Sir Edmund Huddleston, of Sawston, Cambridgeshire. He matriculated from Balliol College, Oxford, on 18 January 1605, aged 14, and graduated B.A. on 20 October 1607 and M.A. on 4 July 1610.

Wilde became a student of the Inner Temple in about November 1602, and was called to the bar in 1612. He was elected a bencher in 1628, and created a serjeant-at-law in 1636. He was appointed under-steward of Kidderminster by the new charter for that borough on 4 August 1636. He served for Droitwich in the parliaments of 1620–22, 1624, 1625, 1626, 1628–29, and March to May 1640. In the parliament of 1626 he took part in the debate against George Villiers, 1st Duke of Buckingham, when he argued from Bracton that common fame was a sufficient ground for accusation.

== Member of the Long Parliament ==
On 21 October 1640 Wilde was returned as one of the knights of the shire for Worcestershire to the Long Parliament. He was chairman of the committee appointed to prepare the impeachment against the thirteen bishops concerned in making the new canons, which on 3 August 1641 he presented to the House of Lords. In December he presided over a committee of inquiry as to a plot to bring in the army to overawe the parliament, and on 6 January 1642 he was chairman of the committee of the house appointed to sit in the Guildhall, London, to consider the safety of the kingdom and city, and the preservation of the privileges of parliament, which were threatened by the seizure of the members' papers and the king's demand for the arrest of the five members. The same month he reported a conference with the lords respecting the action of the attorney-general, Sir Edward Herbert, and conducted the impeachment of Herbert which was ordered by the Commons.

On the outbreak of the First English Civil War, the Commons recommended him for appointment as a deputy-lieutenant of Worcestershire on 18 March 1642, and he was made a sequestration commissioner for that county in April 1643. In February 1643 he was recommended for the post of chief baron of the exchequer in the unsuccessful propositions made by the Commons to the king. He was one of the twenty members of parliament who were lay members of the Westminster Assembly which met on 1 July 1643.

Parliament, at Wilde's suggestion, ordered a new Great Seal of the Realm in the place of that which Edward Littleton, 1st Baron Lyttleton of Mounslow had carried to the king. It was resolved to entrust the new seal to six commissioners, comprising two lords and four commoners, and on 10 November 1643 Wilde was elected as one of the latter. By successive votes these commissioners, notwithstanding the self-denying ordinance, retained the custody of the seal for three years, when on 30 October 1646 they surrendered it to the speakers of the two houses.

Wilde was one of the managers on the part of the Commons (where he still kept his seat) in the impeachment of Archbishop William Laud, whose trial commenced on 12 March 1644. He served on most of the principal committees of the Long parliament. He was made recorder of Worcester in July 1646. The Commons ordered him and others to hold assizes in the counties of Gloucester, Monmouth, and Hereford. Subsequently, he was ordered to go the Oxfordshire and Hampshire circuits. As judge of assize, he condemned Captain John Burley to be hanged at Winchester for causing a drum to be beaten for 'God and King Charles' at Newport, Isle of Wight, to rescue the captive king, while he directed the grand jury to ignore the bill of indictment against Major Edmund Rolph for plotting to murder the king.

On 12 October 1646 Parliament filled the vacancies on the judicial bench, and they appointed him chief baron of the exchequer, replacing Sir Richard Lane, who had been appointed by the King. Wilde retained this position in 1649 when the king was beheaded; but though nominated by parliament a member of the high court of justice for the trial of the king on 1 January 1649, he, like the other judges, took care not to attend any of its meetings, and his excuses were allowed. He took the new oaths of office under the Commonwealth, and was elected a member of the first council of state on 14 February. He was placed upon numerous committees, and was re-elected on 12 February 1650 to the second council of state, which lasted until 15 February 1651. He was one of the militia commissioners for Worcestershire on 25 September 1651.

== Protectorate ==
When Oliver Cromwell assumed the position of lord protector in December 1653, he replaced Wilde with William Steele as chief baron. (Hardres, Reports). Wilde keenly felt this slight. He remained out of judicial employment during the remainder of Oliver Cromwell's life, and it is probable that he retired to his Worcestershire estate. He acted as justice of the peace, and was made a commissioner for raising the assessment in the county in 1656.

In Richard Cromwell's parliament, which lasted from January to April 1659, Wilde again served as member for Droitwich, and there presented a petition praying a restoration to his former office as chief baron, and for payment of the arrears due to him for his salary. The former was refused, but the latter was granted.

== Second Commonwealth ==
On the return of the Rump parliament, on 7 May 1659, Wilde resumed his place as a member, and on 16 June following the house ordered that Wilde and other justices go the circuit. He was restored by parliament to his former post of chief baron on 17 January 1660. He assisted the lords in several committees of the Convention Parliament and escaped further question.

== Restoration ==
When King Charles returned in May, he appointed Sir Orlando Bridgeman in his place as chief baron, but in consequence of his having assisted the lords in several committees of the Convention parliament, Wilde escaped further question, and, was not excluded from the general pardon in the Act of Indemnity. Aged 70 he retired to his house at Hampstead, where he died in 1669.

== Assessment ==
Wilde's character has been variously judged; Sir Bulstrode Whitelocke (a Roundhead), describes him as learned in his profession, but of more reading than depth of judgement, and as executing his office with diligence and justice. The Earl of Clarendon (a Cavalier) calls him an infamous judge, and John Burton speaks of his tiresome speeches.

== Family ==
Wilde married Anne, eldest daughter and coheir of Sir Thomas Harries, 1st Baronet, M.P., serjeant-at-law, of Tong Castle, Shropshire. who died in 1624 aged 16 at the birth of their only child. There is no record of a subsequent marriage. He died aged about 79 at his house in Hampstead and was buried at Wherwell Priory, Hampshire, then the seat of Charles West, 5th Baron De La Warr who had married Wilde's only child and heiress, Anne.

== Notes ==
Parliament of England
Preceded by Edwin Sandys; Ralph Clare	Member of Parliament for Droitwich; 1621–1629; With: Sir Thomas Coventry 1621; Ralph Clare 1621–1622; Walter Blount 1624; Thomas Coventry 1625–1626; George Wylde II 1628–1629	Parliament suspended until 1640
Vacant Parliament suspended since 1629	Member of Parliament for Droitwich; April 1640; With: Samuel Sandys	Succeeded by Samuel Sandys; Endymion Porter
Preceded by Sir Thomas Lyttelton; Sir John Pakington, Bt	Member of Parliament for Worcestershire; November 1640; With: Humphrey Salwey	Succeeded by Richard Salwey; John James
Vacant Not represented in Second Protectorate Parliament	Member of Parliament for Droitwich; 1659; With: Edward Salwey	Not represented in Restored Rump
Legal offices
Preceded by Sir Richard Lane	Lord Chief Baron of the Exchequer; 1648–1655	Succeeded by Sir William Steele
Preceded by Sir Thomas Widdrington	Lord Chief Baron of the Exchequer; 1660	Succeeded by Sir Orlando Bridgeman
