= Francis Newport =

Francis Newport may refer to:

- Francis Newport (fl. 1559), MP for Droitwich
- Francis Newport (died 1623) (c. 1555–1623), MP for Shropshire
- Francis Newport, 1st Earl of Bradford (1620–1708), English soldier, courtier and politician
