= Edward Jeffreys =

English lawyer, judge and Tory politician

Edward Winnington or Jeffreys (8 October 1669 – 20 July 1725), of Ham Castle, Droitwich, was an English lawyer, judge and Tory politician who sat in the House of Commons from 1708 to 1725. He was considered the most powerful advocate on the Oxford circuit of his time.

== Early life ==
Jeffreys was born Winnington, a younger son of Sir Francis Winnington and his second wife Elizabeth Salway, daughter of Edward Salwey. He was admitted at Middle Temple in 1687, and called to the bar on 18 May 1694. He married Jane Bloom, daughter of William Bloom of Altofts, Yorkshire, and the niece and heiress of Henry Jeffreys of Ham Castle in Worcestershire, in about 1709. He took the name Edward Jeffreys to inherit the Jeffreys estates.

== Career ==
Jeffreys was returned unopposed as Tory Member of Parliament for Droitwich at the 1708 general election. He voted against the impeachment of Dr Sacheverell. At the 1710 general election, he was returned unopposed again. He was listed as a ‘worthy patriot’ who helped to detect the mismanagements of the previous administration, and as a member of the October Club. He was not very active in Parliament and appears to have been devoting time and effort as a practicing barrister. In 1711 he was made a Queen's Counsel and was appointed Puisne Justice of the Great Sessions for Carmarthenshire, Cardiganshire, and Pembrokeshire. Within a year, he resigned his judgeship in favour of his brother in November 1712 and appears to have preferred to concentrate on his lucrative legal practice. He was dealing with several cases of great political importance. At the 1713 British general election, he was returned unopposed again for Droitwich. He appears to have made little impact in the House in 1714 but was appointed judge again as Puisne Justice of Chester, Denbigh, Flintshire and Monmouthshire which meant he had to stand for re-election in May.

At the 1715 general election he was again returned unopposed as MP for Droitwich, but with the change of Government became a leading speaker for the Tory opposition. He spoke against the septennial bill in 1716, the army in 1717, and the repeal of the Occasional Conformity and Schism Acts and the Peerage Bill in 1719. In 1720 he became a bencher of his Inn. He was elected to the South Sea committee in 1721. At the 1722 British general election he was returned unopposed again as MP for Droitwich.

== Death and legacy ==
Jeffries' love of country sports, particularly hunting, may have been a distraction from his professional ambitions. In 1725, he needed treatment to his foot after a hunting accident, but developed gangrene. He had his leg amputated before he died on 20 July 1725. He left no surviving children, and his estates went to his eldest brother Salwey Winnington.

Parliament of Great Britain
Preceded by Edward Foley; Charles Cocks	Member of Parliament for Droitwich; 1708–1725; With: Edward Foley 1708–1711; Richard Foley 1711–1726	Succeeded by Richard Foley; Thomas Winnington
Legal offices
Preceded by John Warde	Puisne Justice of Chester; 1714–1725	Succeeded by John Willes
