= Ralph Clare =

English courtier and politician (1589–1670)

Sir Ralph Clare (1589–1670) was an English courtier and politician who sat in the House of Commons at various times between 1614 and 1628.

== Life ==
Clare was the eldest son of Sir Francis Clare of Caldwell, Worcestershire who died in 1608. He matriculated at Hart Hall, Oxford on 12 May 1597 aged 10 and was awarded BA from St John's College, Oxford on 17 February 1601. In 1602 he was a student of the Middle Temple. He was in service to Prince Henry from about 1606 until the Prince's death on 6 November 1612. In 1614, Clare was elected Member of Parliament for Droitwich. He was elected MP for Droitwich in February 1621 in a by-election. Under King James I he was Keeper of Bewdley Park and Keeper of the deer at Twickenham. In 1624 he was elected MP for Bewdley and was re-elected MP for Bewdley in 1625. He was appointed Knight of the Order of the Bath at the coronation of Charles I on 2 February 1626. He was re-elected MP for Bewdley in 1626 and in 1628 and sat until 1629 when King Charles decided to rule without parliament for eleven years. He was Gentleman of the Privy Chamber to Charles I. On 4 August 1636 he was appointed the first steward of Kidderminster.

In November 1640, he was elected to represent Bewdley in the Long Parliament, but his election was declared void. He did not take arms for the King in the civil war but as a long-standing royal servant, he was subject to penalties. He was assessed at £1000 on 19 August 1646 and on 8 March 1648 was sequestered for non-payment. On 10 July 1650 he was discharged as having paid his fine. In 1651 he joined the Royalist army for Charles II which was defeated at the Battle of Worcester. He was taken prisoner and in June 1655 he was committed to Worcester prison with Colonel Sandys and Major Wilde. He was released and went into exile with King Charles II. On the Restoration, he became a Gentleman of the King's Privy Chamber. He became a J.P. for Worcester on 10 July 1660, and was granted £3000 on 30 August 1660 for services to the King. He stood unsuccessfully for parliament at Bewdley in 1661 and petitioned without success. In 1664 he was granted another £3000 for services to the last two kings and for his sufferings after the civil war.

Clare died unmarried at the age of 82 and was buried at St Mary and All Saints' Church, Kidderminster on 23 April 1670.

Parliament of England
Preceded by George Wylde I John Brace	Member of Parliament for Droitwich; 1614; With: Edwin Sandys	Succeeded by Sir Thomas Coventry
Preceded by Sir Thomas Coventry; John Wilde	Member of Parliament for Droitwich; 1621–22; With: John Wilde	Succeeded by John Wilde; Walter Blount
Preceded by Sir Thomas Edmondes	Member of Parliament for Bewdley; 1624–1629	Parliament suspended until 1640
