= John Brace =

John Brace may refer to:

- John Brace (MP) (1578–?), English politician
- John Thurlow Brace (1685–?), British landowner and politician
- John Brace (by 1519-59 or later), MP for Weymouth 1547 and Bletchingley 1559
- John Brace (MP for Worcestershire) (died c. 1431), MP for Worcestershire 1402,1415,1419,1421,1425
- John Brace, see The Oaks

== See also ==
- Jonathan Brace (1754–1837), American lawyer, politician and judge
