= Thomas Winnington (politician, born 1696) =

British politician (1696–1746)

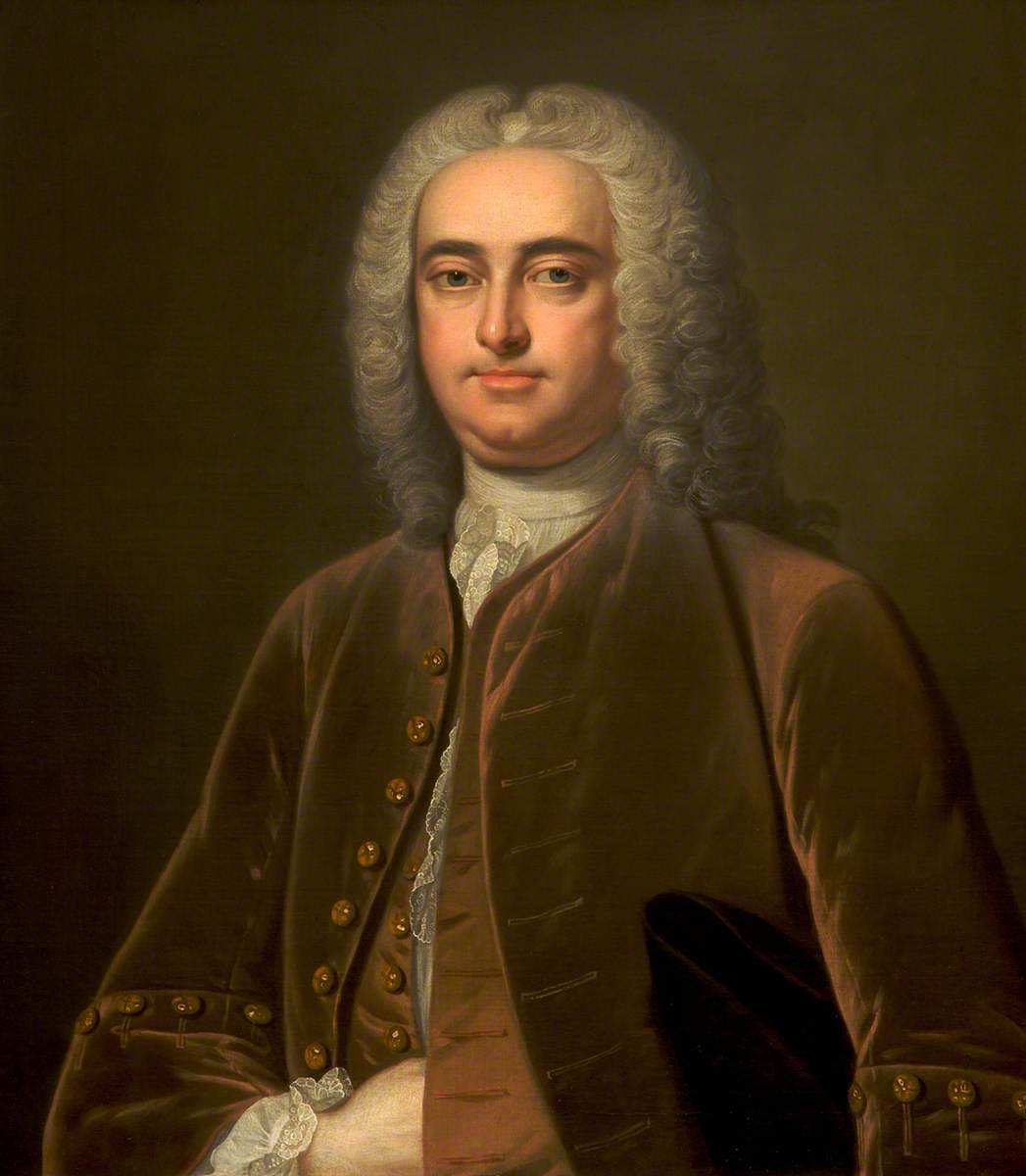
Portrait by John Giles Eccardt, 1740

Thomas Winnington PC (31 December 1696 – 23 April 1746), of Stanford Court, Stanford on Teme. Worcestershire, was an English Whig politician who sat in the House of Commons from 1726 to 1746.

== Biography ==
Winnington was the second, but eldest surviving, son of Salwey Winnington of Stanford Court, Member of Parliament for Bewdley, and his wife Anne Foley, daughter of Thomas Foley, MP, of Witley Court, Worcestershire. He was grandson of Sir Francis Winnington, who had been Solicitor General in the 1670s. He was educated at Westminster School and matriculated at Christ Church, Oxford in 1713. He was admitted to Middle Temple in 1714.

Winnington entered Parliament at a by-election on 31 January 1726 as a Tory Member of Parliament for Droitwich, but very soon after became a Whig and supported the Administration. He was returned unopposed again in 1727 and 1734. At the 1741 returned for Droitwich and also elected in a contest for Worcester (a more prestigious constituency), and he chose to sit for Worcester in what turned out to be his last Parliament.

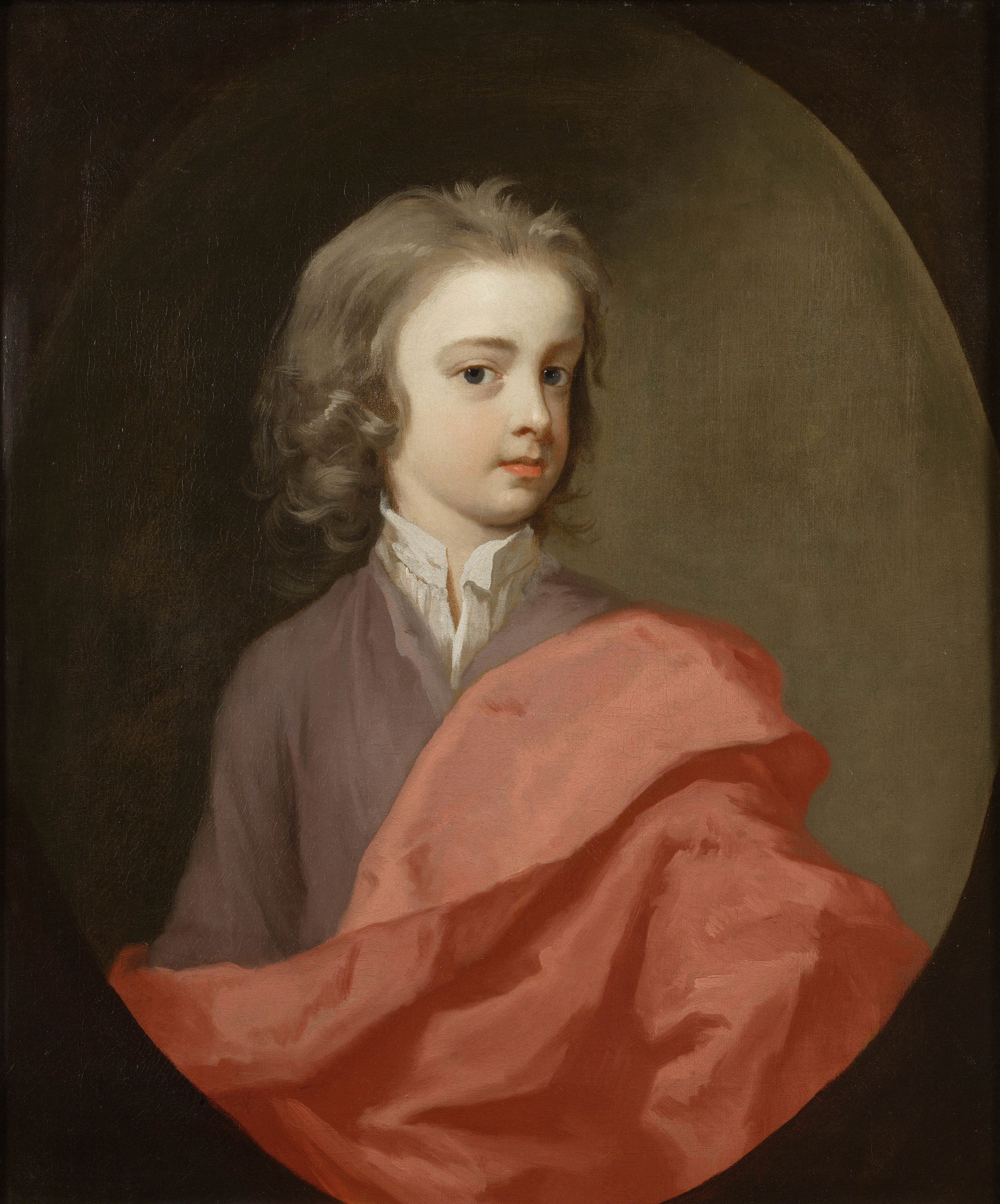
Winnington as a child, painted by Michael Dahl

A supporter of the Prime Minister Robert Walpole, Winnington was made a Lord of the Admiralty in 1730, and served as a Lord of the Treasury from 1736 to 1742; in 1741 he was made a Privy Counsellor and became Cofferer of the Household. When Henry Pelham became Prime Minister in 1743, he appointed Winnington Paymaster General of the Forces, the post he himself had held in the previous administration (although unlike Pelham, Winnington was not accorded a seat in the Cabinet); he held this post for the remaining two-and-a-half years of his life.

Winnington purchased the shares of the elder sisters in the family estate of Stanford (which his grandfather Sir Francis had acquired for the family through his second marriage), and in 1674 he bought the leasehold interest under the crown of the manor of Bewdley.

== Family ==
In 1719, Winnington married Love Reade, daughter of Sir James Reade, Bt. of Brocket Hall, Hertfordshire. They had no children. Winnington became the lover of Etheldreda Townshend in 1742 and it was said that she was the one in charge. The affair provoked a duel but eventually ended shortly before he died after a quarrel related to the Jacobite cause. The Stanford Court estate subsequently passed to his cousin who became Sir Edward Winnington, 1st Baronet. The Elizabethan mansion of Stanford Court was burnt on 5 December 1882, and the valuable books and manuscripts in the old library were destroyed. Stanford Court was rebuilt and remained the family seat until sold by Sir Francis Winnington, 6th Baronet in 1949.

== Notes ==
Parliament of Great Britain
Preceded by Richard Foley; Edward Winnington (later Jeffreys)	Member of Parliament for Droitwich; 1726–1742; With: Richard Foley 1726–1732; Edward Foley 1732–1741; Thomas Foley 1741–1742	Succeeded by Thomas Foley; Lord George Bentinck
Preceded by Samuel Sandys; Richard Lockwood	Member of Parliament for Worcester; 1741–1746; With: Samuel Sandys 1741–1744; Sir Henry Harpur 1744–1746	Succeeded by Sir Henry Harpur; Thomas Vernon
Political offices
Preceded by Horace Walpole	Cofferer of the Household; 1741–1743	Succeeded by The Lord Sandys
Preceded by Henry Pelham	Paymaster General of the Forces; 1743–1746	Succeeded by William Pitt
