= Thomas Wylde =

English politician and administrator

Thomas Wylde (c. 1670 – 12 April 1740) was an English politician and administrator. His residence was The Commandery, Worcester.

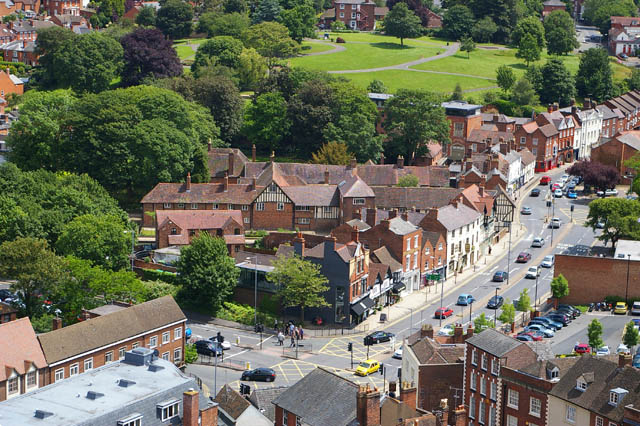
View of the Commandery from Worcester Cathedral

He was the eldest son of Robert Wylde (c. 1622 – 1689) of The Commandery and his wife Elizabeth (née Dennis). In 1696, he first married Katherine, daughter of Sir Baynham Throckmorton, 3rd Baronet and Katherine Edgecumbe. By Katherine, he was father of Robert Wylde (died 1752), a director of the South Sea Company. He married secondly in 1720 Anne, widow of Charles Dowdeswell, MP for Tewkesbury 1713–1714, and daughter of Robert Tracy of Coscomb, Gloucestershire, a Justice of the Court of Common Pleas.

== House of Commons ==
Under the will of his distant (half second cousin twice removed) kinsman Edmund Wylde (1618-1695) sometime MP for Droitwich Thomas inherited considerable estates including Glazeley, Shropshire, enabling a career in parliament.

He was Member of Parliament for Worcester in nine parliaments from 1701 to 1727 and a commissioner of the excise for Ireland from 1727 to 1737, being unable to meet the expense of re-election to parliament.

== Posterity ==
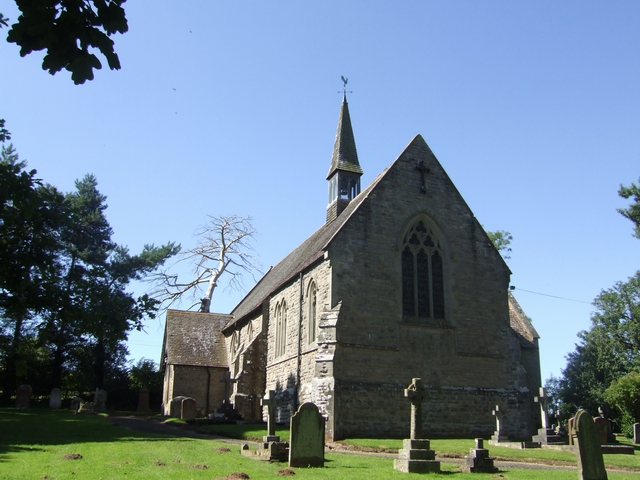
Glazeley church beside Woodlands and Uplands

"This Thomas represented the city of Worcester in Parliament, and very greatly impaired his fortune by contested elections. He was succeeded by his son, Robert, who married a daughter of Charles Dowdeswell, of Forthampton Court, co. Gloucester, and had issue Thomas Wylde, who, by his first wife, had issue a son, Thomas Rous Wylde, who married Anne, daughter of William Russell, of Powick; and by his second, Elizabeth, daughter and co-heiress of Ralph Browne, of Caughley, Salop, he was father of a son, Ralph Browne Wylde, who assumed the surname of Browne, and was father of the present Thomas Whitmore Wylde-Browne, of the Woodlands, Salop. (Mr. Ralph B. Wylde-Browne succeeded to this estate on the death of his half-brother, Thomas Rous Wylde.)

Charles, the second son of Robert Wylde, married a Miss Fewtrell, and his present representative is the Rev. Charles Edmund Fewtrell-Wylde, son of the Rev. Robert Wylde, vicar of Claverdon, co. Warwick, and nephew of John Fewtrell-Wylde, of the Uplands, Chelmarsh, Salop, who assumed the surname and arms of Fewtrell, in addition to, and before those of Wylde, on the 9th of July, 1852, in compliance with the will of his said uncle."

Parliament of Great Britain
| Preceded by Sir William Bromley; Samuel Swift | Member of Parliament for Worcester; 1701–1727; With: Samuel Swift 1701–1718; Samuel Sandys 1718–1727 | Succeeded by Samuel Sandys; Sir Richard Lane |
