= Droitwich (constituency) =

Parliamentary constituency in the United Kingdom, 1832–1918

Worcestershire, Mid or Droitwich Division
- Former county constituency for the House of Commons

1885–1918
- Seats: one
- Replaced by: Kidderminster and Evesham

1554–1885
- Seats: two (1554–1832); one (1832–1885)
- Type of constituency: Borough constituency

Droitwich was the name of a constituency of the House of Commons of England in 1295, and again from 1554, then of the House of Commons of Great Britain from 1707 to 1800 and of the House of Commons of the Parliament of the United Kingdom from 1801 to 1918. It was a parliamentary borough in Worcestershire, represented by two Members of Parliament until 1832, and by one member from 1832 to 1885. The name was then transferred to a county constituency electing one MP from 1885 until 1918.

== History ==
The borough consisted of three parishes and parts of two others in the town of Droitwich, a market town which for many centuries depended on the salt trade for its prosperity. When Droitwich's right to return MPs (which had been allowed to lapse) was restored in 1554, there was only one salt pit in the borough, and this became the basis of Droitwich's unique franchise: the right to vote was vested solely in those burgesses (members of the corporation) who owned shares in the pit giving them the right to draw brine. This was finally established by a resolution of the House of Commons in 1690; yet within a few years of this date that salt pit had dried up completely; by 1747 it was accepted that ownership of this property had no function except conferring the vote, and had to be proved by possession of the title deeds since there could be no evidence of an otherwise meaningless right which could not be exercised in practice.

Although these details of the franchise were unique to Droitwich, in practice it in many ways resembled a burgage borough, and like most of those came under the influence of a local magnate. The Foley family, Worcestershire industrialists, controlled Droitwich from the middle of the 17th century, although they seem to have allowed the townspeople to choose one of the two members at some periods. There was no contested election between 1747 and 1832, and by the time of the Reform Act it was estimated that only 28 men had the right to vote.

In 1831, the population of the borough was 2,487, and contained 533 houses. However, the boundaries were revised by the provisions of the Great Reform Act, taking in the rest of the town and some adjoining villages, so that the new constituency adjoined the borough of Worcester to the south. This increased the population to 5,992, which was enough for Droitwich to retain one of its two MPs, and there were 243 voters on the register for the first election under the reformed franchise, in 1832.

There was a further slight enlargement of the boundaries to the east in 1868. However, the constituency was not big enough to keep its MP under the Third Reform Act, which came into effect at the general election of 1885. The borough was abolished, but the town's name was applied to the new county division in which it was placed, formally called The Mid or Droitwich Division of Worcestershire. This was a constituency with a considerable industrial vote, including the heavy industrial town of Stourbridge and the carpet-weaving town of Stourport-on-Severn, but also contained a substantial middle-class residential population, boosted by the votes of the Kidderminster freeholders (who were entitled to a vote in the county division even if they lived within the Kidderminster borough boundaries), as well as agricultural interests. With a popular sitting Liberal MP turning Liberal Unionist in 1886, this was enough to keep Droitwich a relatively safe Unionist seat except in the Liberal landslide of 1906.

The constituency was abolished in 1918, being divided between the redrawn Kidderminster and Evesham constituencies.

== Members of Parliament ==
=== Droitwich borough ===
==== MPs 1554–1660 ====
The constituency was re-established during the reign of Queen Mary I. The following were members of Parliament during the succeeding period:

Year	First member	First party	Second member	Second party
1554	George Newport		Robert Wythe	
1555	George Newport		Robert Wythe	
1558	Walter Gower		Robert Wythe	
1559	Francis Newport		Robert Wythe	
1562	Walter Gower		Robert Wythe	
1571	Francis Brace		Francis Kinwelmarsh	
1572	John Russell		William Sebright	
1584	George Wylde I		Jasper Cholmley	
1586	Francis Brace		George Lyttelton	
1588	Francis Brace		William Combe	
1593	Robert Walter		George Wylde I	
1597	John Acton		Thomas Baily	
1601	John Buck		Humphrey Wheler	
1604	George Wylde I		John Brace	
1614	Edwin Sandys		Ralph Clare	
1621	Sir Thomas Coventry replaced by Ralph Clare		John Wilde	
1624	Walter Blount		John Wilde	
1625	Thomas Coventry		John Wilde	
1626	Thomas Coventry		John Wilde	
1627	George Wylde II		John Wilde	
1629–1640	Personal Rule of Charles I: no Parliament			
1640 Short; Parliament	John Wilde		Samuel Sandys I	Royalist
1640 Long; Parliament	Endymion Porter	Royalist	Samuel Sandys I	Royalist
Aug. 1642	Endymion Porter	Royalist	disabled to sit – seat vacant	
Mar. 1643	disabled to sit – seat vacant		disabled to sit – seat vacant	
1647	Thomas Rainsborough		Edmund Wylde	
1648	George Wylde II (died 1650)		Edmund Wylde	
1653	Droitwich was unrepresented in the Barebones Parliament and the First and Second Parliaments of the Protectorate			
1659	Edward Salway		John Wilde	
1659	Third Protectorate Parliament – unknown			

==== MPs 1660–1832 ====
Year	First member	First party	Second member	Second party
1660	Samuel Sandys I		Thomas Coventry	
1661	Samuel Sandys II		Henry Coventry	
1681	Samuel Sandys I		Henry Coventry	
1685	Samuel Sandys II	Whig	Thomas Windsor	Tory
1689	Samuel Sandys II	Whig	The Earl of Bellomont	Whig
1690	Philip Foley	Country Whig	The Earl of Bellomont	Whig
1695	Edward Harley	Tory	Charles Cocks	Whig
1698	Thomas Foley	Tory	Charles Cocks	Whig
1699	Thomas Foley	Tory	Charles Cocks	Whig
February 1701	Philip Foley	Tory	Charles Cocks	Whig
November 1701	Edward Foley	Tory	Charles Cocks	Whig
1708	Edward Foley	Tory	Edward Winnington from 1709 Jeffreys	Tory
1711	Richard Foley	Tory	Edward Winnington from 1709 Jeffreys	Tory
1726	Richard Foley	Tory	Thomas Winnington	Whig
1732	Edward Foley	Tory	Thomas Winnington	Whig
1741	Thomas Foley, later Lord Foley	Tory	Thomas Winnington	Whig
1742	Thomas Foley, later Lord Foley	Tory	Lord George Bentinck	Whig
July 1747	Thomas Foley, later Lord Foley	Tory	Francis Winnington	
December 1747	Edwin Sandys	Tory	Francis Winnington	
1754	Thomas Foley, later Lord Foley	Whig	Robert Harley	Tory
May 1768	Edward Foley		Robert Harley	Tory
April 1774	Edward Foley		Andrew Foley	Whig
May 1774	Rowland Berkeley		Andrew Foley	Whig
October 1774	Thomas Foley, later 2nd Lord Foley	Whig	Andrew Foley	Whig
1777	Sir Edward Winnington, Bt	Whig	Andrew Foley	Whig
1805	Thomas Foley	Whig	Andrew Foley	Whig
1807	Sir Thomas Winnington, Bt	Whig	Andrew Foley	Whig
1816	The Earl of Sefton	Whig	Andrew Foley	Whig
1819	The Earl of Sefton	Whig	Thomas Foley	Whig
1822	The Earl of Sefton	Whig	John Hodgetts-Foley	Whig
1831	Sir Thomas Winnington	Whig	John Hodgetts-Foley	Whig
1832	Representation reduced to one member			

==== MPs 1832–1885 ====
Election	Member	Party
1832	John Hodgetts-Foley	Whig
1835	John Barneby	Conservative
1837	Sir John Pakington	Conservative
1874	John Corbett	Liberal
1885	Borough abolished – county division established	

=== Mid or Droitwich Division of Worcestershire ===
==== MPs 1885–1918 ====
Election	Member	Party
1885	John Corbett	Liberal
1886	John Corbett	Liberal Unionist
1892	Richard Martin	Liberal Unionist
1906	Cecil Harmsworth	Liberal
Jan. 1910	John Lyttelton	Liberal Unionist
1916 b-e	Herbert Whiteley	Unionist
1918	Constituency abolished	

== Election results ==
=== Elections in the 1830s ===
General election 1830: Droitwich
Party	Candidate	Votes	%
Whig	William Molyneux	Unopposed	
Whig	John Hodgetts-Foley	Unopposed	
Whig hold			
Whig hold			

General election 1831: Droitwich
Party	Candidate	Votes	%
Whig	John Hodgetts-Foley	Unopposed	
Whig	Thomas Winnington	Unopposed	
Registered electors		c. 28	
Whig hold			
Whig hold			

General election 1832: Droitwich
Party	Candidate	Votes	%
Whig	John Hodgetts-Foley	Unopposed	
Registered electors		243	
Whig hold			

General election 1835: Droitwich
Party	Candidate	Votes	%
Conservative	John Barneby	128	50.6
Whig	John Hodgetts-Foley	125	49.4
Majority		3	1.2
Turnout		253	88.8
Registered electors		285	
Conservative gain from Whig			

On petition, Barneby's tally was reduced to 125, and Foley's to 124.

General election 1837: Droitwich
Party	Candidate	Votes	%
Conservative	John Pakington	Unopposed	
Registered electors		341	
Conservative hold			

=== Elections in the 1840s ===
General election 1841: Droitwich
Party	Candidate	Votes	%
Conservative	John Pakington	Unopposed	
Registered electors		347	
Conservative hold			

General election 1847: Droitwich
Party	Candidate	Votes	%	±%
Conservative	John Pakington	Unopposed		
Registered electors		346		
Conservative hold				

=== Elections in the 1850s ===
Pakington was appointed Secretary of State for War and the Colonies, requiring a by-election.

By-election, 4 March 1852: Droitwich
Party	Candidate	Votes	%	±%
Conservative	John Pakington	Unopposed		
Conservative hold				

General election 1852: Droitwich
Party	Candidate	Votes	%	±%
Conservative	John Pakington	Unopposed		
Registered electors		367		
Conservative hold				

General election 1857: Droitwich
Party	Candidate	Votes	%	±%
Conservative	John Pakington	Unopposed		
Registered electors		371		
Conservative hold				

Pakington was appointed First Lord of the Admiralty, requiring a by-election.

By-election, 3 March 1858: Droitwich
Party	Candidate	Votes	%	±%
Conservative	John Pakington	Unopposed		
Conservative hold				

General election 1859: Droitwich
Party	Candidate	Votes	%	±%
Conservative	John Pakington	Unopposed		
Registered electors		394		
Conservative hold				

=== Elections in the 1860s ===
General election 1865: Droitwich
Party	Candidate	Votes	%	±%
Conservative	John Pakington	Unopposed		
Registered electors		400		
Conservative hold				

Pakington was appointed First Lord of the Admiralty, requiring a by-election.

By-election, 11 July 1866: Droitwich
Party	Candidate	Votes	%	±%
Conservative	John Pakington	Unopposed		
Conservative hold				

Pakington was appointed Secretary of State for War, requiring a by-election.

By-election, 13 March 1867: Droitwich
Party	Candidate	Votes	%	±%
Conservative	John Pakington	Unopposed		
Conservative hold				

General election 1868: Droitwich
Party	Candidate	Votes	%	±%
Conservative	John Pakington	790	56.7	N/A
Liberal	John Corbett	603	43.3	New
Majority		187	13.4	N/A
Turnout		1,393	90.9	N/A
Registered electors		1,532		
Conservative hold		Swing	N/A	

=== Elections in the 1870s ===
General election 1874: Droitwich
Party	Candidate	Votes	%	±%
Liberal	John Corbett	787	66.2	+22.9
Conservative	John Pakington	401	33.8	−22.9
Majority		386	32.4	N/A
Turnout		1,188	86.3	−4.6
Registered electors		1,377		
Liberal gain from Conservative		Swing	+22.9	

=== Elections in the 1880s ===
General election 1880: Droitwich
Party	Candidate	Votes	%	±%
Liberal	John Corbett	857	70.8	+4.6
Conservative	George Allsopp	348	28.8	−5.0
Liberal	Ernest B. A. Jones	5	0.4	N/A
Majority		509	42.0	+9.6
Turnout		1,210	85.9	−0.4
Registered electors		1,408		
Liberal hold		Swing	+4.8	

General election 1885: Droitwich
Party	Candidate	Votes	%	±%
Liberal	John Corbett	Unopposed		
Liberal hold				

General election 1886: Droitwich
Party	Candidate	Votes	%	±%
Liberal Unionist	John Corbett	4,031	59.3	New
Liberal	Arthur James Dadson	2,761	40.7	N/A
Majority		1,270	18.6	N/A
Turnout		6,792	71.6	N/A
Registered electors		9,484		
Liberal Unionist gain from Liberal		Swing	N/A	

=== Elections in the 1890s ===
Richard Martin

General election 1892: Droitwich
Party	Candidate	Votes	%	±%
Liberal Unionist	Richard Martin	3,980	53.9	−5.4
Liberal	Thomas English Stephens	3,410	46.1	+5.4
Majority		570	7.8	−10.8
Turnout		7,390	75.5	+3.9
Registered electors		9,786		
Liberal Unionist hold		Swing	−5.4	

General election 1895: Droitwich
Party	Candidate	Votes	%	±%
Liberal Unionist	Richard Martin	Unopposed		
Liberal Unionist hold				

=== Elections in the 1900s ===
General election 1900: Droitwich
Party	Candidate	Votes	%	±%
Liberal Unionist	Richard Martin	4,020	51.7	N/A
Liberal	Cecil Harmsworth	3,752	48.3	New
Majority		268	3.4	N/A
Turnout		7,772	76.4	N/A
Registered electors		10,175		
Liberal Unionist hold		Swing	N/A	

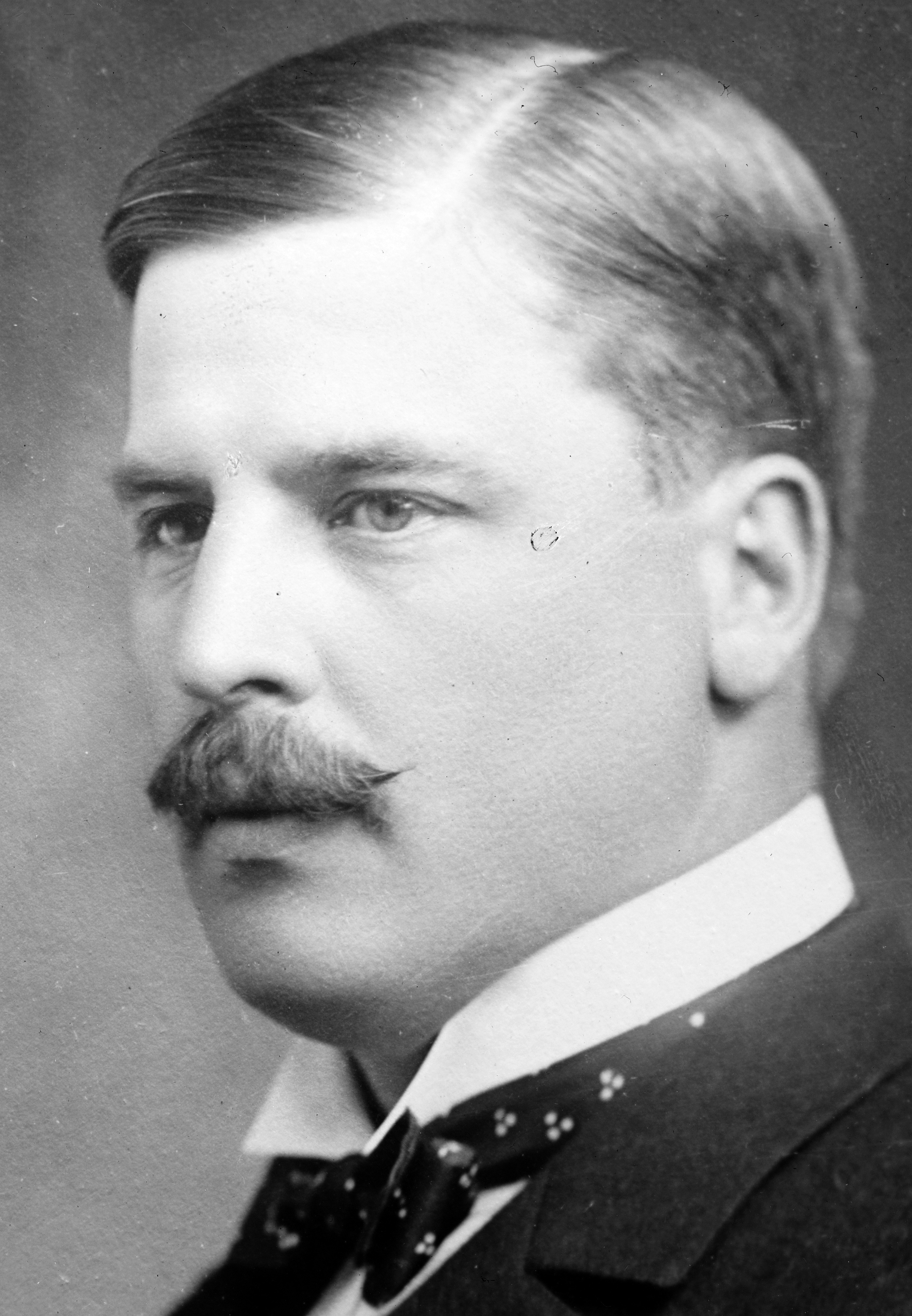
C.B. Harmsworth

General election 1906: Droitwich
Party	Candidate	Votes	%	±%
Liberal	Cecil Harmsworth	5,165	52.8	+4.5
Conservative	Eric Ayshford Knight	4,611	47.2	−4.5
Majority		554	5.6	N/A
Turnout		9,776	86.6	+10.2
Registered electors		11,283		
Liberal gain from Liberal Unionist		Swing	+4.5	

=== Elections in the 1910s ===
General election January 1910: Droitwich
Party	Candidate	Votes	%	±%
Liberal Unionist	John Lyttelton	5,078	50.5	+3.3
Liberal	Cecil Harmsworth	4,973	49.5	−3.3
Majority		105	1.0	N/A
Turnout		10,051	89.7	+1.1
Registered electors		11,200		
Liberal Unionist gain from Liberal		Swing	+3.3	

General election December 1910: Droitwich
Party	Candidate	Votes	%	±%
Liberal Unionist	John Lyttelton	4,880	50.4	−0.1
Liberal	Clifford H Brookes	4,808	49.6	+0.1
Majority		72	0.8	−0.2
Turnout		9,688	86.5	−3.2
Registered electors		11,200		
Liberal Unionist hold		Swing	−0.1	

General Election 1914–15:

Another General Election was required to take place before the end of 1915. The political parties had been making preparations for an election to take place and by July 1914, the following candidates had been selected;

- Unionist: John Lyttelton
- Liberal: Clifford H Brookes

Whiteley

1916 Droitwich by-election
Party	Candidate	Votes	%	±%
Unionist	Herbert Whiteley	Unopposed		
Unionist hold				
