= Edward Foley (1676–1747) =

English Tory politician

Edward Foley (1676 – 4 April 1747) was an English Tory politician who sat in the English and British House of Commons between 1701 and 1741.

== Early life ==
Foley was baptized on 23 September 1676, the second son of Thomas Foley of Whitley Court, Worcestershire, and his wife Elizabeth Ashe, daughter of Edward Ashe, MP. He began in business as a casual participant in commercial enterprises but his gambling became a concern to his family. In 1704 he was said to have lost £1,000 in a gambling party at Tunbridge Wells, but it appears subsequently that it was brought under control.

== Career ==
Foley was returned unopposed as Tory Member of Parliament for Droitwich at the second general election of 1701. On 26 February 1702, he voted in vindication of the impeachment proceedings against four Whig lords. He was returned at the 1702 English general election, but with other family members in the House of Commons, his activities could not be distinguished. He was an assistant at the Royal African Company from 1704 to 1705. He was returned unopposed again at the 1705 English general election and at the 1708 British general election. He voted against the impeachment of Dr Sacheverell in 1710. After he was returned unopposed as MP at the 1710 British general election, he was listed among the ‘worthy patriots’ who exposed the mismanagements of the old ministry, and the ‘Tory patriots’ who supported the new administration's peace policy. He was also a member of the October Club. He became a Commissioner for taking subscriptions to the South Sea Company in 1711. In June 1711 he was nominated by Robert Harley to the office of Receiver general of leather duty at a salary of £350 p.a. whereupon, he gave up his parliamentary seat to his younger brother, Richard. He lost the post in 1714 on the accession of George I.

Foley decided to take up the law and was admitted at Lincoln's Inn in 1717. He was never called to the bar, but maintained chambers at Lincoln's Inn.

Foley succeeded to the property of his brother Richard on his death in 1731 and replaced him as MP for Droitwich at a by-election on 15 April 1732. He was returned again at the 1734 British general election. After voting consistently with the Opposition, he gave up his seat at the 1741 British general election.

== Death and legacy ==
Foley died unmarried on 4 April 1747 from an infection in his foot. His estate passed to his nephew, the 2nd Lord Foley.

Parliament of Great Britain
Preceded by Charles Cocks; Philip Foley	Member of Parliament for Droitwich; 1701–1711; With: Charles Cocks 1701–1708; Edward Winnington (later Jeffreys) 1708–1711	Succeeded by Edward Winnington (later Jeffreys); Richard Foley
Preceded by Richard Foley; Thomas Winnington	Member of Parliament for Droitwich; 1732–1741; With: Thomas Winnington	Succeeded by Thomas Winnington; Thomas Foley
