= Samuel Swift =

English Tory politician

Samuel Swift (c. 1659 – 8 February 1718) was an English Tory politician, MP for Worcester from 1693 to 1694 and 1695 to 1718.

Swift was the son of William Swift, a Worcester merchant, and his wife, Martha Beauchamp.

On 25 November 1679, Swift married Sarah Shrewing, daughter of Thomas Shrewing of Worcester.

He pursued a career in local Worcester politics, serving on the council from 1677, as Chamberlain in 1678–79, Sheriff in 1683–84, Mayor in 1684–85 and October–November 1688, alderman in 1689, and High Sheriff of Worcestershire in 1692–93.

In 1693, Sir John Somers, having been appointed Lord Keeper of the Great Seal, vacated his seat at Worcester. A bitter by-election ensued, contested by the Tory Swift and the Whig Charles Cocks, Somers' brother-in-law. 682 votes elected Swift to 575, but Cocks petitioned the House of Commons to overturn the result on the grounds of illegal voting practices. The petition was upheld on 7 February 1694, and Swift was unseated, prompting outrage among the citizens of Worcester.

In 1695 Cocks stood at Droitwich, and Swift was re-elected at Worcester. He held the seat until his death.

In 1696–97, during an enquiry into the Royal Mint, Swift was accused of involvement in coin clipping, a treasonable offence. The House of Commons voted that these allegations were groundless and frivolous on 8 April 1697.

He died on 8 February 1718.

Parliament of England
Preceded by William Bromley; Sir John Somers	Member of Parliament for Worcester; 1693–1694; With: William Bromley	Succeeded by William Bromley; Charles Cocks
Preceded by William Bromley; Charles Cocks	Member of Parliament for Worcester; 1695–1718; With: William Bromley; Thomas Wylde	Succeeded by Thomas Wylde; Samuel Sandys
