= 60 Carey Street =

Historic house in Holborn, London

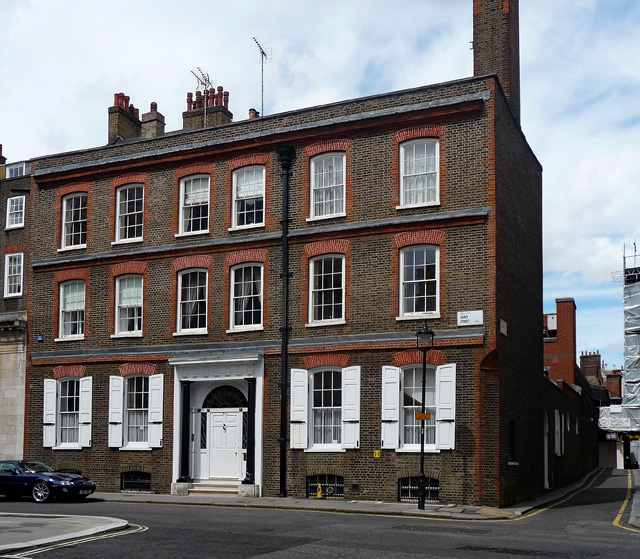
- Interactive map of the 60 Carey Street area

General information
- Type: Residential
- Architectural style: Georgian
- Location: Holborn, London, England
- Coordinates: 51°30′55″N 0°06′45″W
- Completed: 1732

Listed Building – Grade II*
- Official name: 60, CAREY STREET
- Designated: 24 October 1951
- Reference no.: 1244098

60 Carey Street is a Grade II* listed house on Carey Street in Holborn, London. Nearby to the Royal Courts of Justice, Lincoln's Inn and the Law Society it has historically been connected to the law institutions of the area, the latter being the current owner.

== History ==
The house was built between 1731 and 1732 for Richard Foley, an MP and bencher of nearby Lincoln's Inn. The Doric entrance was added around 1800 and restoration was carried out between 1929 and 1932 for use by the President of the Law Society.

== See also ==
- Carey Street
- Law Society of England and Wales
