= William Bromley (of Holt Castle) =

English Whig politician (1656–1707)

William Bromley (26 June 1656 – 5 August 1707) was an English Whig politician, MP for Worcester and Worcestershire.

Bromley was the son of Henry Bromley MP and his wife Mercy Pytts, daughter of Edward Pytts MP.

He matriculated at Christ Church, Oxford, in 1673, aged 17, and entered the Middle Temple in 1674.

Bromley served as MP for Worcester 1685–1700, and became a consistent supporter of the Whig Junto of Sir John Somers, for a time his fellow MP for Worcester. In 1697 he was Captain of a Troop of Horse in the Worcestershire Militia.

Bromley was elected knight of the shire for Worcestershire in November 1701. He was defeated in 1702 – he declared himself "in a melancholy way since the election", and blamed the defeat on poor Whig party management. He was re-elected in 1705, serving until his death on 5 August 1707.

== Family ==
On 25 April 1675 he married Margaret Berkeley, daughter of Sir Rowland Berkeley MP. They had three daughters, of which two outlived Bromley as his co-heirs:

- Mercy Bromley, married John Bromley MP
- Dorothy Bromley, married firstly Clobery Bromley MP, secondly John Jennings of Hayes

Parliament of England
Preceded by Henry Herbert; Sir Francis Winnington	Member of Parliament for Worcester; 1685–1700; With: Bridges Nanfan 1685–87; Sir John Somers 1689–93; Samuel Swift 1693–94, 1695–1700; Charles Cocks 1694–95	Succeeded by Thomas Wylde; Samuel Swift
Preceded by Sir John Pakington, Bt; William Walsh	Member of Parliament for Worcestershire; 1701–1702; With: Sir John Pakington, Bt	Succeeded by Sir John Pakington, Bt; William Walsh
Preceded by Sir John Pakington, Bt; William Walsh	Member of Parliament for Worcestershire; 1705–1707; With: Sir John Pakington, Bt	Succeeded by Sir John Pakington, Bt; Sir Thomas Winford, Bt
