= Carey Street =

Street in Central London

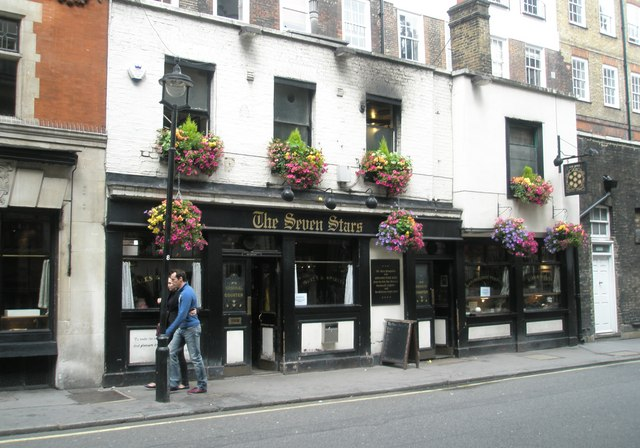
The Seven Stars pub.

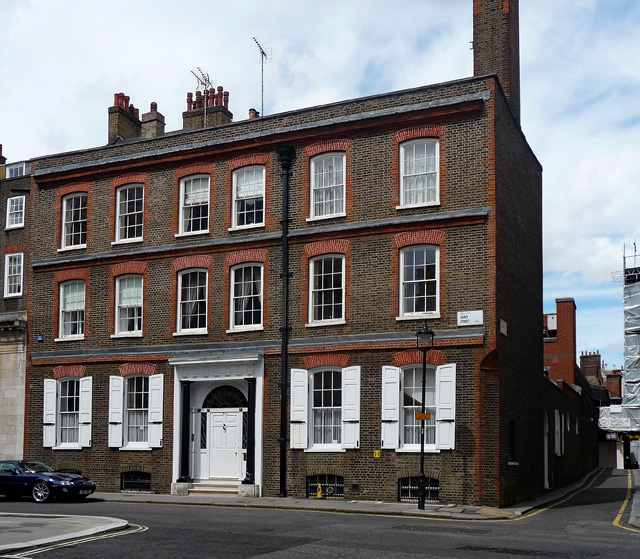
Number 60 Carey Street, a Grade II* listed building dating to 1730.

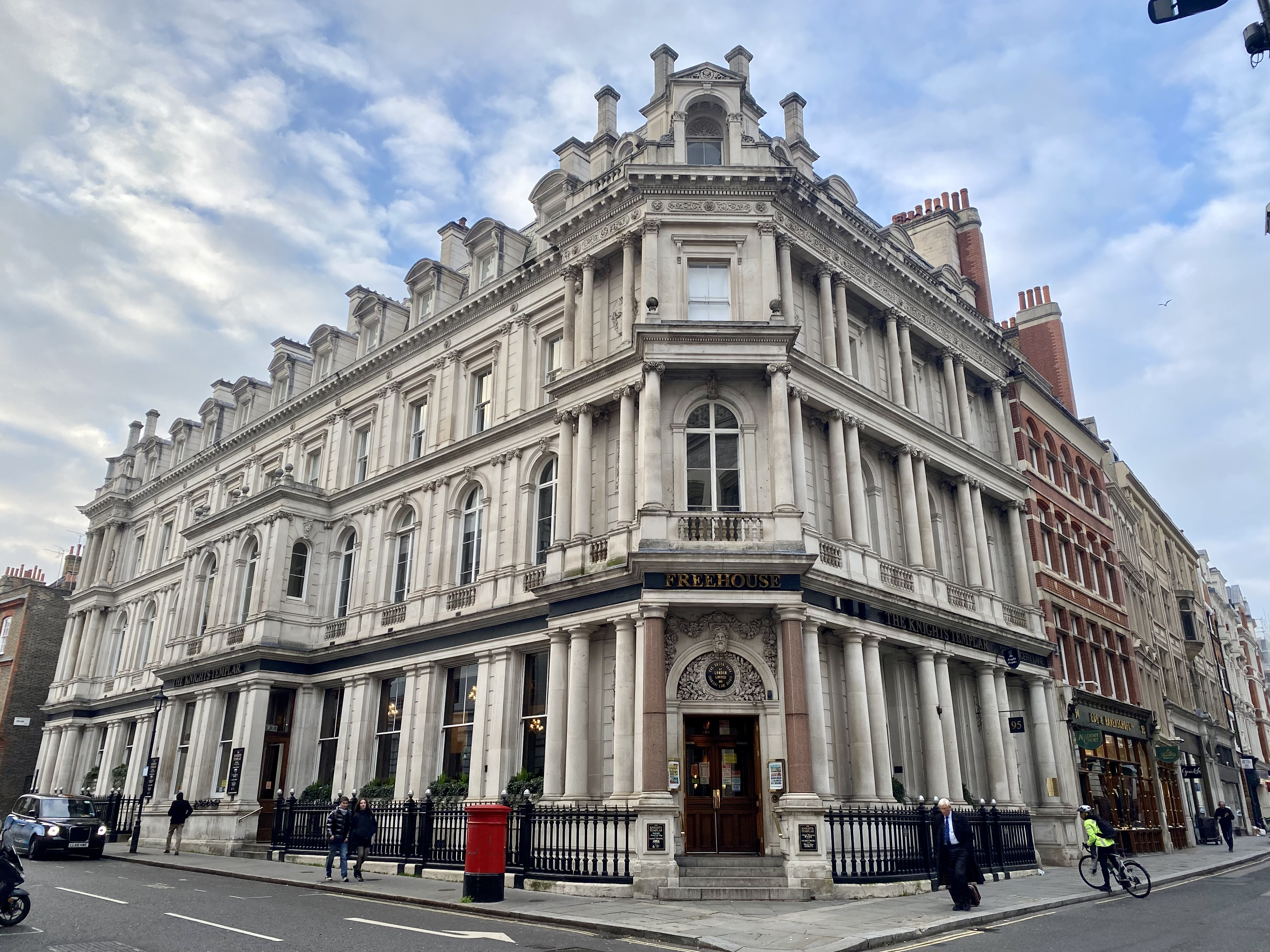
The old Union Bank of London building on the corner with Chancery Lane.

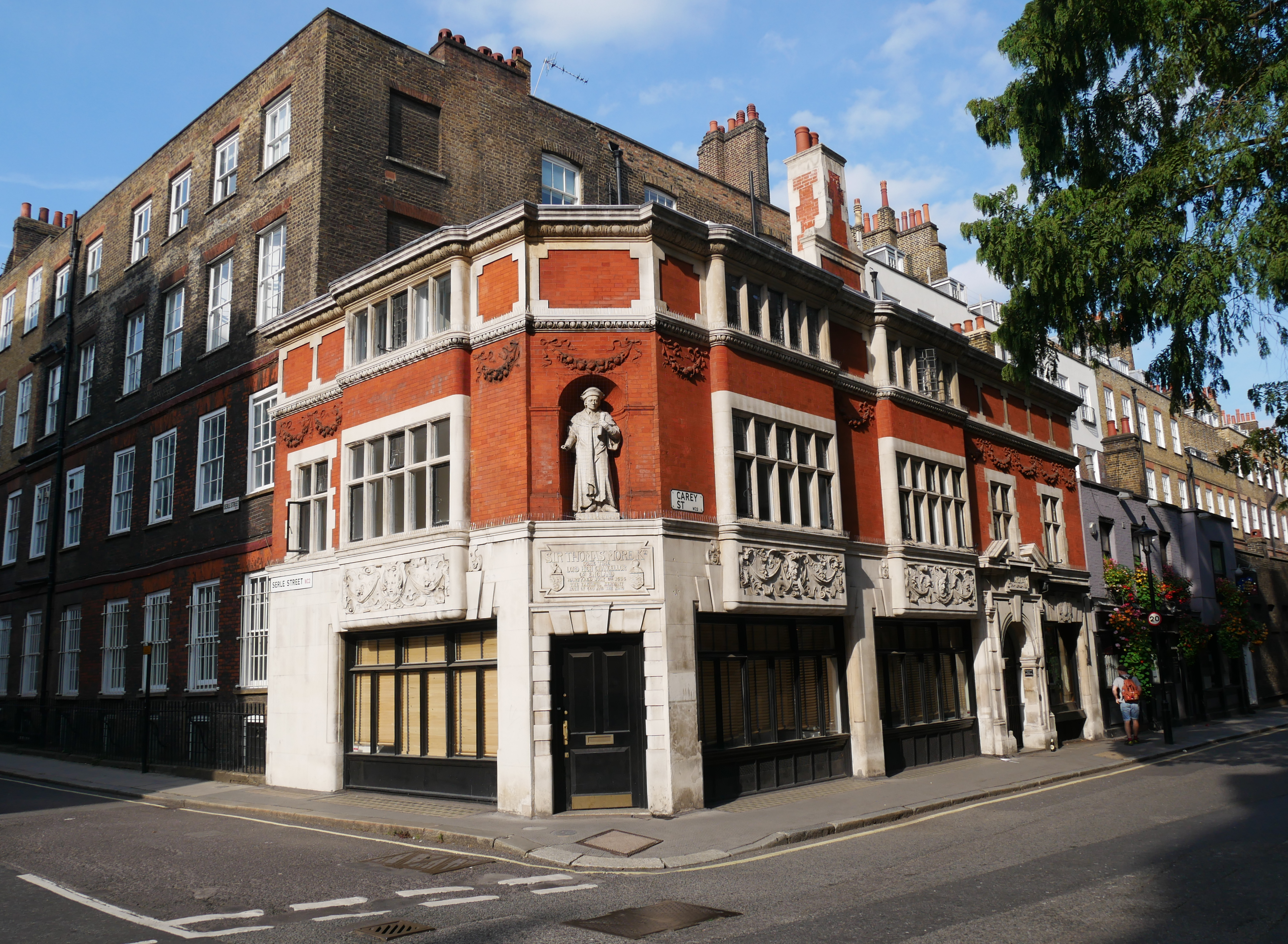
Thomas More House, with the Seven Stars to its right.

Carey Street is a road in the Holborn area of Central London. Located close to Lincoln's Inn Fields and the Royal Courts of Justice, it runs from Portugal Street to Chancery Lane parallel to the Strand to the south. New Square is a little to the north, connected by an arched gateway dating back to the 1697. While the western end of Carey Street is in the City of Westminster the eastern end beyond the junction with Serle Street is in the London Borough of Camden. It takes its name from Nicholas Carey who owned a house in the street in the seventeenth century.

Historically, "Being in Carey Street" was an expression meaning bankruptcy due to the location of the bankruptcy court in the street. Amongst the buildings is the Grade II* listed house at number 60. (built in 1730 for the politician Richard Foley) and the Seven Stars pub dating back to the Jacobean era. On the corner with Serle Street is Thomas More House, built in 1888 to a design by George Campbell Sherrin, and featuring a statue of Thomas More above its entrance. At the junction with Chancery Lane was the headquarters of the Union Bank of London, a Grade II listed former bank later converted into a pub the Knights Templar by Wetherspoons.

== Bibliography ==
- Bebbington, Gillian. London Street Names. Batsford, 1972.
- Cherry, Bridget & Pevsner, Nikolaus. London 4: North. Yale University Press, 2002.
- Denford, Steven & Hayes, David Streets of Old Holborn. Camden History Society, 2008.
- Schur, Norman W. British English from A to Zed: A Definitive Guide to the Queen's English. Skyhorse, 2013.
