= Daniel Eliot =

British politician

Daniel Eliot (1646–1702) of Port Eliot, St Germans, Cornwall was an English politician who served as Member of Parliament for St Germans from 1679 until 1700 and April to December 1701.

Port Eliot, St Germans, Cornwall

Born at Port Eliot in 1646, he was the son of John Eliot and Honora Norton. His younger brother Richard (1652–1685) was also a member of parliament for St Germans. Eliot attended Christ's College at Cambridge. Following his father's death in 1685 he inherited Port Eliot and married Katherine Fleming. They had a daughter Katherine (died 1724) who married Browne Willis in 1707.

He left Port Eliot to his cousin Edward Eliot, MP.

Parliament of England
Preceded by John Eliot and Edward Eliot	Member of Parliament for St Germans; 1660–1700; With: Richard Eliot; Sir Thomas Higgons; Sir Walter Moyle; Henry Fleming; John Tanner	Succeeded by John Speccot and Henry Fleming
Preceded by John Speccot and Henry Fleming	Member of Parliament for St Germans; April–December 1701; With: Henry Fleming	Succeeded by Richard Edgcumbe and Henry Fleming
