= Richard Braham =

Sir Richard Braham, 1st Baronet (c. 1613 – 1676), was an English politician who sat in the House of Commons from 1661 to 1676.

Braham was the son of Richard Braham (pronounced Breame), of New Windsor, Berkshire and of Wandsworth, Surrey and his wife Elizabeth Giles, daughter of Nathaniel Giles, Doctor of Music and Master of the Children of the Chapel Royal. His father died on 2 March 1618. Braham was admitted to Gray's Inn on 7 March 1634. He was knighted at Oxford on 21 March 1645. In July 1641 he was defeated at a by-election for Windsor. He compounded in May 1646 and was fined £364. In 1661, Braham was elected Member of Parliament for Windsor in the Cavalier Parliament and was created a baronet on 16 April 1662.

Braham died at the age of about 62 and was buried in April 1676. Braham married firstly, Susan Southcote, daughter of Sir George Southcote, Governor of Dartmouth Castle, Devon. She died aged 22 on 5 May 1642, and was buried at New Windsor. He married secondly, Susan Gawsell, daughter of Sir Robert Gawsell, of Watlington, Norfolk. He married thirdly by licence dated 6 May 1663 Jane Scobell, widow of Henry Scobell of St. Margaret's, Westminster and daughter of Thomas Devenish, of Langham, Dorset. He appears to have married fourthly by licence on 29 November 1671, Dorothy Brandling, widow of Carmarthen. Sir Richard had no children by any of his wives and the baronetcy became extinct on his death.

Parliament of England
Preceded by Alexander Baker; Roger Palmer	Member of Parliament for Windsor; 1661–1676; With: Sir Thomas Higgons	Succeeded by Sir Thomas Higgons; Sir Francis Winnington
Baronetage of England
New creation	Baronet; 1662–1676	Extinct
