= John Buck (MP) =

Member of the Parliament of England

Sir John Buck or Sir John Bucke (c. 1566 – c. 1648) was an English landowner and politician who sat in the House of Commons in 1601.

Bucke was the son of Francis Bucke of The Nash, Kempsey, Worcestershire and first cousin of George Wylde through their Wall grandparents. He matriculated at Magdalen Hall, Oxford under date 25 February 1581, aged 15. He entered Inner Temple in 1586. From 1591 he fought in the Netherlands campaign with the English army under Sir Francis Vere. The following year he was in charge of a company of infantry and fought with distinction notably at the Siege of Steenwijk.

In 1601, he was elected Member of Parliament for Droitwich. He was knighted on 23 July 1603. He also possessed Hamby Grange, Lincolnshire.

Bucke died at the age of about 81.

Parliament of England
Preceded by John Acton; Thomas Baily	Member of Parliament for Droitwich; 1601; With: Humphrey Wheler	Succeeded by George Wylde I John Brace
