= George Wylde II =

English lawyer and politician

George Wylde (or Wilde; 1594 – 15 January 1650 (Note: All dates in this article are in the Old Style Julian calendar used in Britain throughout Wylde's lifetime; however, years are assumed to start on 1 January rather than 25 March, which was the English New Year.)) was an English lawyer and politician who sat in the House of Commons at various times between 1628 and 1650.

Wylde was the younger son of George Wylde and his wife Frances Huddleston, daughter of Sir Edmund Huddleston of Sawston, Cambridgeshire. He was baptised at St Peter de Witton, Droitwich, matriculated at Balliol College, Oxford on 18 March 1608 aged 14 and was awarded BA on 24 January 1611. He was called to the bar at the Inner Temple on 16 April 1618.

In 1628, Wylde was elected Member of Parliament for Droitwich with his brother John and sat until 1629 when King Charles decided to rule without parliament for eleven years. He became a bencher of his Inn on 14 June 1635. In December 1648 he was elected MP for Droitwich in the Rump Parliament and sat until his death in 1650. His principal residence was The Harriots, Droitwich.

Wylde died on 15 January 1650 and was buried in Westminster Abbey on the north side of the Chapel of Kings by St Paul's door.

== Notes ==
Parliament of England
Preceded by Thomas Coventry; John Wilde	Member of Parliament for Droitwich; 1628; With: John Wilde	Parliament suspended until 1640
Preceded by Thomas Rainsborough; Edmund Wylde	Member of Parliament for Droitwich; 1648–1650; With: Edmund Wylde	Succeeded by Edmund Wylde
