= Charles Cocks (1646–1727) =

English Whig politician

Charles Cocks (1646–1727) was an English Whig politician, MP for Worcester and Droitwich.

Cocks was baptised on 9 September 1646, the oldest son of Thomas Cocks of Castleditch, Herefordshire, and his second wife Elizabeth Gower.

Cocks' wife Mary was the sister of Lord Somers, the future Lord Chancellor.

In 1693 Somers, having been appointed Lord Keeper of the Great Seal, vacated his seat at Worcester. A bitter by-election ensued, contested by the Whig Cocks and the Tory Samuel Swift. Swift was elected by 682 votes to 575, but Cocks petitioned the House of Commons to overturn the result on the grounds of illegal voting practices. The petition was upheld on 7 February 1694, and Cocks took the seat, prompting outrage among the citizens of Worcester.

In 1695, instead of standing at Worcester (where Swift was re-elected), Cocks stood at Droitwich, and was elected. He was a supporter of Somers and the Whig Junto.

In 1699 Cocks was appointed Clerk of the Patents, an office in the Court of Chancery (therefore in the gift of his brother-in-law, Lord Chancellor Somers).

Cocks was involved in manoeuvring regarding the management of the salt springs in Droitwich. He and William Bromley prepared a bill in 1707, which ran into opposition and lapsed in committee. Cocks presented another bill on 17 January 1708, which again faced opposition in committee on the issue of the town corporation's consent: the bill had not been signified in writing. Cocks (who chaired the committee), facing defeat, adjourned the committee for a fortnight, "that in the meantime the corporation might signify their consent to it if it was their intention". The fiasco probably cost Cocks his seat in 1708. He did not stand for parliament again.

Cocks evidently died early in 1727: on 27 February 1727, his son James Cocks wrote to his son-in-law Philip Yorke about commencing administration of the will.

== Family ==
Cocks married Mary Somers, sister of Lord Somers. They had the following children:

- Margaret Cocks (died 1761), married firstly William Lygon (died 1716), secondly Philip Yorke, 1st Earl of Hardwicke, Lord Chancellor
- John Cocks (died 1771), father of Charles Cocks, 1st Baron Somers
- Catherine Cocks (died 1705), married James Harris
- James Cocks MP (died 1750)
- Elizabeth Cocks

Parliament of England
Preceded by William Bromley; Samuel Swift	Member of Parliament for Worcester; 1694–1695; With: William Bromley	Succeeded by William Bromley; Samuel Swift
Preceded by Philip Foley; The Earl of Bellomont	Member of Parliament for Droitwich; 1695–1708; With: Edward Harley 1695–98; Thomas Foley 1698–99; Thomas Foley 1699–1701; Philip Foley 1701; Edward Foley 1701–08	Succeeded by Edward Foley; Edward Winnington (Jeffreys)
