= Richard Lane (barrister) =

English barrister

Sir Richard Lane (1584 – 12 May 1650), a.k.a. Edward Lane, was an English barrister who practised mostly in the Court of Exchequer. He acted as defence counsel to the Earl of Strafford when the Earl was impeached and attainted, and also represented Archbishop Williams and eleven other bishops who were imprisoned in the Tower of London in 1642.

During the English Civil War, Lane took the side of the king, who made him Chief Baron of the Exchequer and a member of the Privy Council. From 1645 until his death he was also Lord Keeper of the Great Seal, although after 1646 the appointment was a nominal one, as the Great Seal had been destroyed on the orders of Parliament.

He negotiated the terms of Charles I's surrender to Fairfax in 1646, went into exile with the future Charles II, and died on the island of Jersey in 1650.

== Early life ==
Lane was the eldest son of another Richard Lane, who was a yeoman at Courteenhall, Northamptonshire, by his marriage to Elizabeth, the daughter of Clement Vincent of Harpole. He was baptised on 12 November 1584. He was educated at Westminster School and Trinity College, Cambridge, where he was a scholar from 1602. On 8 February 1605, he was admitted to the Middle Temple to train for a career in the law and was called to the bar on 22 November 1611.

== Career ==
Lane practised mostly in the Court of Exchequer. In 1615 he was appointed as deputy recorder of Northampton and in 1628 as the town's recorder. In 1634 he became attorney-general to the Prince of Wales. On 12 June 1635 he became a bencher of his inn, and during the same year he acted as counsel to the University of Cambridge. In 1637 he was elected as treasurer of the Middle Temple. In 1638 Henry Rich, 1st Earl of Holland, appointed him to serve as his deputy in the forest courts.

On 28 January 1632 Lane filed a bill of complaint in the Court of Requests against Sir Matthew Brend on behalf of Cuthbert Burbage and the representatives of the other original lessees of the Globe Theatre, seeking an extension of their lease.

In the same year, 1632, the poet Thomas Randolph, the step-son of Lane's sister Dorothy, dedicated his The Jealous Lovers to Lane.

In 1641 Lane was counsel to Strafford when he was impeached and attainted for high treason. In the debate on the bill of attainder, Lane argued that a statute of Henry IV of 1399 had had the effect of repealing the declaratory power given to parliament by the Statute of Treasons of 1351, so that the present parliament had no authority to bring a bill of attainder against Strafford. Parliament rejected this argument, and the king assented to the bill of attainder. Strafford was beheaded on Tower Hill on 12 May 1641.

Later in 1641 Lane served as defence counsel to Sir Robert Berkeley, who was impeached in October 1641, and from January 1641/42 he defended Archbishop Williams and his eleven fellow bishops who had been imprisoned in the Tower of London.

Lane remained loyal to the king when hostilities with Parliament broke out during the summer of 1642. He entrusted his library and other goods in London to his friend Bulstrode Whitelocke and joined the court at Oxford, where he was made welcome. The University of Oxford awarded him the degree of Master of Arts on 1 November 1642. In 1643, to punish Lane for his loyalty to Charles I, the Long Parliament gave orders for his estate to be sequestered and all his property at the Middle Temple seized. On 4 January 1644/45 Lane was knighted by the king and later the same month he was appointed a serjeant-at-law and Chief Baron of the Exchequer. On 31 January he received the Oxford degree of Doctor of Civil Laws. The king also appointed Lane to the Privy Council.

In January 1645 Lane acted as one of the king's commissioners at Uxbridge, where he opposed the demand by parliament that it should control the militia.

A few days after the death of Lord Littleton on 27 August 1645, the king appointed Lane Lord Keeper of the Great Seal.

On 24 June 1646, the king's stronghold of Oxford was surrendered to Sir Thomas Fairfax, with Lane acting for the king to negotiate terms. He failed to retain control of the Great Seal, the seals of various other courts, and the Sword of State. Having obtained them all, Fairfax sent them to parliament, which on 3 July resolved to have the Great Seal destroyed. On 11 August the seal was broken up by a smith. However, after the execution of Charles I in 1649, Charles II renewed Lane's patent as nominal Lord Keeper of the Great Seal, a position he held until his death.

On 12 October 1646, Parliament made several new appointments to the judicial bench, replacing Lane as chief baron of the exchequer by John Wilde.

== Exile and death ==
In March 1650, Lane followed the new king into exile, landing at St Malo in a poor state of health. He wrote to Charles II, asking him to make his eldest son, another Richard Lane, a groom of the bedchamber, a request which was honoured. Lane continued to Jersey, where he died on 12 May 1650, to be buried at St Helier. His funeral was attended by the Duke of York.

Lane's Reports in the court of exchequer beginning in the third, and ending in the ninth year of the raign of the late King James were published posthumously in 1657 and contained an important report of Sir Thomas Fleming's opinion in Bates's Case.

== Notes ==
Legal offices
Preceded by Lord Littleton	Lord Keeper of the Great Seal; 1645–1650	Succeeded by Vacant – next held by Sir Edward Herbert
Preceded by Sir Humphrey Davenport	Lord Chief Baron of the Exchequer; 1645–1648	Succeeded by Sir John Wilde
