= Richard Lane (politician) =

British merchant, sugar-baker and politician

Sir Richard Lane MP
- Baptised: 23 August 1668
- Died: 29 March 1756 (aged 87–88)
- Resting place: North Ambulatory, Westminster Abbey
- Other names: Richard Lane the younger; Richard Lane Junior
- Occupations: Merchant; sugar-baker; politician
- Spouse: Sarah Lane (née Davie) c. 1961 – c. 1692–1733
- Children: 9

Mayor of Worcester
- In office 1709–1710
- Monarch: Anne, Queen of Great Britain

High Sheriff of Worcestershire
- In office 1714–1715
- Monarch: George I of Great Britain

Member of Parliament for Minhead
- In office 1721–1722 Serving with Sir John Trevelyan
- Monarch: George I of Great Britain

Member of Parliament for Worcester
- In office 1727–1734 Serving with Samuel Sandys
- Monarch: George II of Great Britain

Sir Richard Lane MP (c. 1667–1756) was a British merchant, sugar-baker and politician, known for prominentance in the salt trade.

== Biography ==
Richard Lane was born to Susanna Lane and Richard Lane, a sugar-baker and merchant from Bristol. Lane was baptised on the 23 August 1668 at St Philip and St Jacob Church in Bristol.

Sometime in the 1690s Lane moved to Worcester, where he was established as a merchant and sugar-baker by 1699. In 1705 he succeeded his father. He was Mayor of Worcester for the year 1709 to 1710. In July 1710, while mayor, he put a stop to the ‘insolent progress of Dr. Sacheverel and his deluded followers’. He was High Sheriff of Worcestershire for the year 1714 to 1715, the first year of King George the First, and raised 'the posse comitatus and (thro’ God’s blessing) defeated great numbers of' Jacobites 'who came in tumults there with arms'. He was knighted on 21 October 1714.

Lane was returned as Member of Parliament for Minehead, at a by-election on 18 December 1721. However he had taken the writ from messenger who was supposed to take it to the returning officer, and kept it in his pocket until the election.day. The messenger was taken into custody of the serjeant-at-arms but Lane escaped punishment. He was later unseated on petition on 9 January 1722.

In 1725, some people involved in the Cheshire salt works discovered that the strongest brine lay below the depth of the pits in Droitwich. Lane gave the order to sink through the talc at the bottom of the pits, and the strong brine burst out with such violent abundance, that two men who working in the pit were thrown to the surface and killed. Soon after everyone sunk his pit through the talc and obtained so much strong brine that much of it was wasted, From then on the old pits, which had been worth near £5,000 a year, became valueless.

Lane was returned for Worcester after a contest at the 1727 British general election. He supported the Administration consistently and was rewarded with the appointment of his eldest son as receiver general of the land tax for Worcestershire, while his second son was appointed a commissioner for licensing hawkers and pedlars. In March 1732 Lane spoke in favour of the free export of wool and yarn from Ireland. He was a salt exporter and at this time he was involved in a protracted lawsuit with the salt commissioners on a claim for nearly £23,000 for allowances on shipments of salt to Ireland over a period of six months. He protested against the export of rock salt to Ireland because, as there was no restriction on refining it there, it would undercut his own salt. He did not stand in 1734.

== Personal life ==
Lane married Sarah Lane (née Davie) in January c. 1961 – c. 1692, in Chester. The couple had nine children before Sarah's death in 1933. Both Sarah and Lane are buried in the North Ambulatory of Westminster Abbey without monument or gravestone.

Parliament of Great Britain
Preceded by James Milner; Sir John Trevelyan	Member of Parliament for Minehead; 1721–1722; With: Sir John Trevelyan	Succeeded by Robert Mansel; Sir John Trevelyan
Preceded by Thomas Wylde; Samuel Sandys	Member of Parliament for Worcester; 1727–1734; With: Samuel Sandys	Succeeded by Richard Lockwood; Samuel Sandys
