= Thomas Higgons =

English diplomat and politician (d. 1691)

Sir Thomas Higgons (c 1624 – 24 November 1691) was an English diplomat and politician who sat in the House of Commons at various times between 1659 and 1687.

== Life ==
Higgons was the son of Rev. Thomas Higgons, DD, rector of Westbury, Shropshire, and his second wife Elizabeth Barker, daughter of Richard Barker of Haughmond Abbey, Shropshire. His father died in 1636. He matriculated at St Alban Hall, Oxford on 27 April 1638, aged 14 and was a student of Middle Temple in 1639. He travelled abroad in Italy from about 1643 to 1646 and learned the language well enough to translate an account of Venetian triumphs over the Ottoman Empire. He lived at Greywell, Hampshire after his marriage.

In 1659 Higgons was elected Member of Parliament for Malmesbury in the Third Protectorate Parliament. He was elected MP for Windsor for the Cavalier Parliament in 1661. Also in 1661, he was commissioner for assessment for Shropshire to 1663 and commissioner for assessment for Hampshire to 1680. He was knighted on 17 June 1663. Also in 1663, he was commissioner for assessment for Westminster to 1669 and commissioner for assessment for Devon to 1674. He was sub-commissioner for prizes at Newcastle from 1665 to 1667 and a J.P. for Hampshire from 1665 until his death. In 1668 he became Surveyor-general for the Duchy of Cornwall and was appointed envoy extraordinary to Saxony until 1669. He was envoy extraordinary to Venice from 1674 to 1679. In 1685 he was elected MP for St Germans. He was commissioner for assessment for Hampshire from 1689 to 1690.

Higgons died of apoplexy in the Court of King's Bench at the age of about 66 and was buried in Winchester Cathedral.

== Family ==
Higgons married firstly in about 1647, Elizabeth, dowager Countess of Essex, widow of Robert Devereux, 3rd Earl of Essex and daughter of Sir William Powlett of Edington, Wiltshire. They had two daughters; she died in 1656, being buried on 16 September. He married secondly by licence dated 11 November 1661, Bridget Leach, widow of Simon Leach of Cadleigh, Devon, and daughter of the royalist leader Sir Bevil Grenville of Stow, Cornwall, and had three sons (George, Thomas and Bevil) and three daughters. She died in 1692.

Parliament of England
Preceded by Not represented in Second Protectorate Parliament	Member of Parliament for Malmesbury; 1659; With: Sir Henry Lee	Succeeded by Not represented in Restored Rump
Preceded by Alexander Baker; Roger Palmer	Member of Parliament for Windsor; 1661–1679; With: Sir Richard Braham 1661–1676; Sir Francis Winnington 1676–1679	Succeeded by Sir John Ernle; John Powney
Preceded by Richard Eliot; Daniel Eliot	Member of Parliament for St Germans; 1685–1687; With: Daniel Eliot	Succeeded by Daniel Eliot; Sir Walter Moyle
