= George Wylde I =

English lawyer and politician

George Wylde (or Wild or Wilde; 1550 – 27 March 1616) was an English lawyer and politician who sat in the House of Commons at various times between 1584 and 1611.

== Parents ==
Wylde was a younger son of Thomas Wylde of The Commandery Worcester from whom he inherited a small estate. However George was the eldest son of his father's second wife, Ellinor daughter of George Wall of Droitwich, and through his mother he acquired further property at Kempsey, Impney and Droitwich, Worcestershire.

== Career ==
A Worcester lawyer, Wylde was admitted at Inner Temple in November 1567 and was called to the bar. In 1584, he was elected Member of Parliament for Droitwich. He became a bencher of his Inn in 1591 and auditor in 1593. In 1593, he was elected MP for Droitwich again. He was JP for Worcestershire from around 1595 and became one of the Council of Marches of Wales on 7 July 1603. From 1603 to 1605 he was treasurer of his Inn. In 1604 he was elected MP for Droitwich again replacing his first cousin John Bucke. He was reader of his Inn in 1607. In 1614 he became Serjeant-at-law.

Wylde died at the age of 66 and was buried at Droitwich.

== Children in parliament ==
Wylde married Frances Huddleston daughter of Sir Edmund Huddleston of Sawston Hall Cambridgeshire. His sons John Wylde and George Wylde II were also MPs. His daughter Elizabeth (1591–1656) married Sir Walter Blount, 1st Baronet.

Parliament of England
Preceded by John Russell; William Sebright	Member of Parliament for Droitwich; 1584–1586; With: Jasper Cholmley	Succeeded by Francis Brace; George Lyttelton
Preceded by Francis Brace; William Combe	Member of Parliament for Droitwich; 1593–1597; With: Robert Walter	Succeeded by John Acton; Thomas Baily
Preceded by John Buck; Humphrey Wheler	Member of Parliament for Droitwich; 1604–1611; With: John Brace	Succeeded by Edwin Sandys; Ralph Clare
