= Edmund Wylde =

English politician

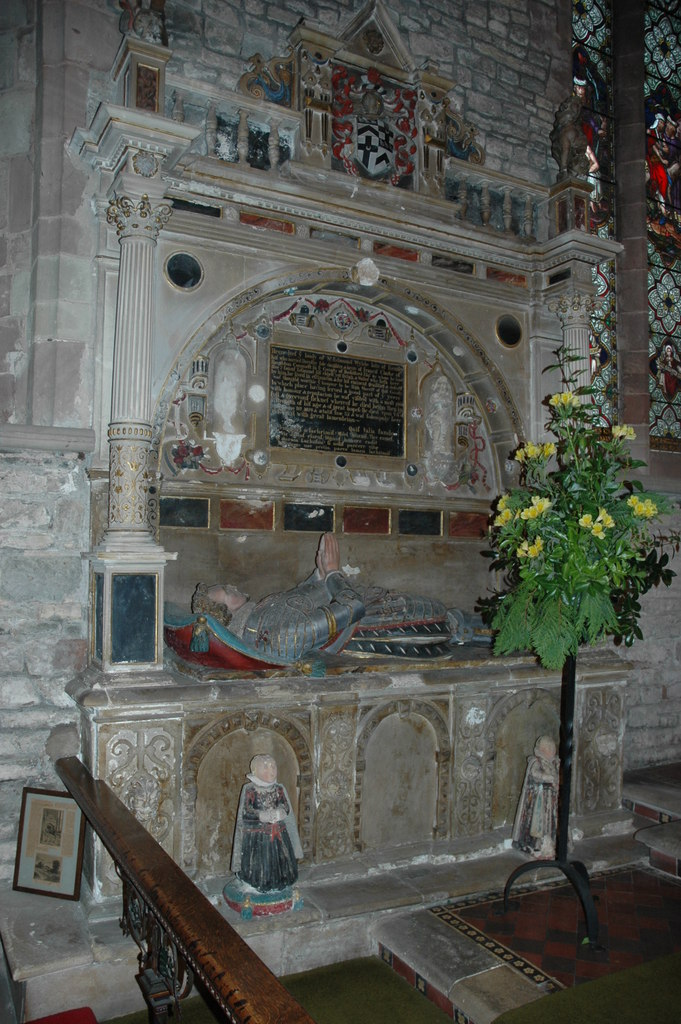
Monument to Edmund Wylde's father, Sir Edmund Wylde, who died aged 32 when High Sheriff of the county with his sons Edmund and Walter kneeling before it, church of St Mary the Virgin, Kempsey Sir Edmund's effigy's nose was flattened by Cromwell 2 July 1646

Edmund Wylde or Edmund Wilde FRS (sometimes Edward Wilde) (10 October 1618 – 1695) was an English politician who sat in the House of Commons from 1646 to 1653.

Wylde was the son of Sir Edmund Wylde of Kempsey, Worcestershire and his wife Dorothy Clarke, daughter of Sir Francis Clarke of Houghton Conquest, Bedfordshire. He matriculated at Christ Church, Oxford on 29 November 1635, aged 15. He was called to the bar at Inner Temple in 1644. In 1646, Wylde was elected Member of Parliament for Droitwich as a recruiter for the Long Parliament. He was a commissioner for the Navy in 1650.

Wylde was a particular friend of William Petty and is described as a "great fautor (favourer] of ingenious men for merit's sake". Wylde became a Fellow of the Royal Society on 20 May 1663. He claimed to have a method of softening steel without the use of fire, but refused to demonstrate it because he considered it a secret.

There is no record of marriage or (legitimate) children. He is reported to have died in 1695 at his residence in Glazeley, Shropshire aged 77. His 8-page will asked for burial in the chancel at Glazeley (where he was buried on 7 January 1695/1696), leaving property in London, manors in Essex, Norfolk, Bedfordshire, Worcestershire and Shropshire and 5 bullaries in Droitwich to his kinsman Robert Wylde (the elder) of The Commandery and his lawful heirs male — in the event Thomas Wylde later MP for Worcester. A number of pages of this will are concerned with provision for Mrs Jane Smith als Pike "now living with me for some years". She was to receive in addition to £2000 cash all his most personal possessions, gold, silver, prints, pictures, library etc. and "the house in which I now live in the Great Square Buildings in Bloomsbury in the parish of St Giles-in-the-Fields Middlesex formerly leased to my late uncle George Wylde of Gressenhall Norfolk". His executors are asked to display his coat of arms on the front of the house while she lives there.

Parliament of England
Preceded by Endymion Porter; Samuel Sandys	Member of Parliament for Droitwich; 1646–1653; With: Thomas Rainsborough 1646–1648; George Wylde II 1648–1650	Succeeded by Not represented in Barebones Parliament
