= 1916 Droitwich by-election =

UK Parliamentary by-election

The 1916 Droitwich by-election was held on 29 February 1916. The by-election was held due to the resignation of the incumbent Conservative MP, John Lyttelton. It was won by the Conservative candidate Herbert Whiteley, who was unopposed.
