= Humphrey Wheler =

Member of the Parliament of England

Humphrey Wheler was an English landowner and politician who sat in the House of Commons in 1601.

Wheler was the son of William Wheler of Martin Hassingtree, Worcestershire, and heir to his elder brother John. He was probably the Humphrey Wheler of Ludlow, who entered the Inner Temple in November 1581. In 1601, he was elected Member of Parliament for Droitwich.

Wheler married Joan Davies daughter of William Davies. His son John was the father of Sir William Wheler, 1st Baronet.

Parliament of England
Preceded by John Acton; Thomas Baily	Member of Parliament for Droitwich; 1601; With: John Buck	Succeeded by George Wylde I John Brace
