= Samuel Sandys, 1st Baron Sandys =

English politician and peer

The Right Honourable The Lord Sandys PC
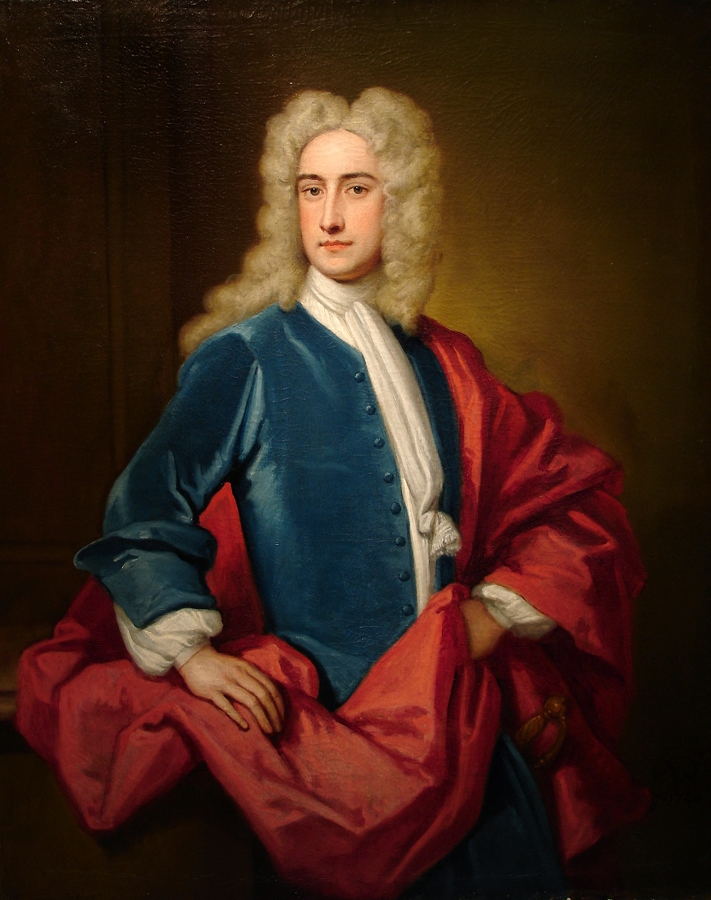
- Portrait by Godfrey Kneller

Chancellor of the Exchequer
- In office 12 February 1742 – 12 December 1743
- Monarch: George II
- Prime Minister: The Earl of Wilmington; Hon. Henry Pelham
- Preceded by: Sir Robert Walpole
- Succeeded by: Hon. Henry Pelham

Personal details
- Born: 10 August 1695
- Died: 21 April 1770 (aged 74) Highgate Hill
- Party: Whig
- Spouse: Letitia Tipping
- Education: New College, Oxford

Samuel Sandys, 1st Baron Sandys PC (10 August 1695 – 21 April 1770) was an English Whig politician and peer who represented Worcester in the British House of Commons from 1718 until 1743 when he was created Baron Sandys. He held numerous posts in the government of the United Kingdom, namely Chancellor of the Exchequer, Leader of the House of Commons, Cofferer of the Household and First Lord of Trade. He was also a justice in eyre.

== Early life ==
Sandys was the eldest son of Edwin Sandys MP (himself a descendant of Edwin Sandys, Archbishop of York), and his wife Alice, daughter of Sir James Rushout Bt MP.

He was educated at New College, Oxford, matriculating in 1711 aged 16. He left Oxford in 1715 without graduating, and embarked on a Grand Tour of Continental Europe.

== Opposition ==
In 1718, at the age of 22, Sandys was elected MP for Worcester, as a Whig. He represented the seat for 25 years.

Initially a supporter of Robert Walpole's government, in 1725 Sandys and his uncle Sir John Rushout went into opposition with William Pulteney. Sandys was seen as second-in-command to Pulteney, the leader of the Patriot Whigs.

In February 1730 Sandys introduced the Pension Bill, to bar from sitting in the House of Commons anyone with any pensions or offices held in trust for them from the Crown. The bill passed through the House of Commons but was rejected by the House of Lords; he reintroduced the bill several times in subsequent sessions, with the same result. Sandys opposed the government's economic policy: in 1733 he opposed both the motion to take £500,000 from the sinking fund and the Excise Bill to tax tobacco and wine imports; in February 1736 he called attention to the increase of the national debt.

On 13 February 1741, Sandys moved a motion to call upon King George II to dismiss Walpole. The Tories did not support the motion, which was defeated by 290 votes to 106; the Tory Jacobite William Shippen commented of Walpole and the opposition Whigs that "Robin and I are two honest men: he is for King George and I for King James, but those men in long cravats only desire places under either one or the other".

== Chancellor of the Exchequer ==
This impression that senior opposition Whigs were motivated by self-advancement rather than by opposition to the government gained substance when Walpole fell in February 1742. Pulteney (created Earl of Bath that year) brokered a deal with the Court, without consulting opposition parties. The new ministry led by Lord Wilmington was a continuation of Walpole's ministry with few personnel changes, but with Sandys appointed Chancellor of the Exchequer, and Sir John Rushout and Phillips Gybbon appointed Lords of the Treasury.

Pulteney and Sandys supported the appointment of a secret committee to investigate Walpole's conduct in office; Sandys was elected a member of the committee. They opposed the repeal of the Septennial Act 1716, and objected to the rejection by the Lords of the Indemnification Bill to recompense witnesses against Walpole. In December 1742 Sandys opposed a Place Bill (to limit the capacity of parliamentarians to hold other paid positions, especially in the military), although he had proposed several such bills when in opposition.

Wilmington died in July 1743, succeeded as First Lord of the Treasury by Henry Pelham. On 12 December 1743, Pelham took the Chancellorship himself.

== Later career ==
Sandys was compensated with a peerage, being created Baron Sandys on 20 December 1743, and appointed as Cofferer of the Household. He later held office as Speaker of the House of Lords in the Pitt–Devonshire ministry (November 1756 – July 1757), and as First Lord of Trade under Lords Newcastle and Bute (March 1761 – February 1763).

Sandys died on 21 April 1770, from injuries sustained when his post chaise overturned on Highgate Hill.

== Family ==
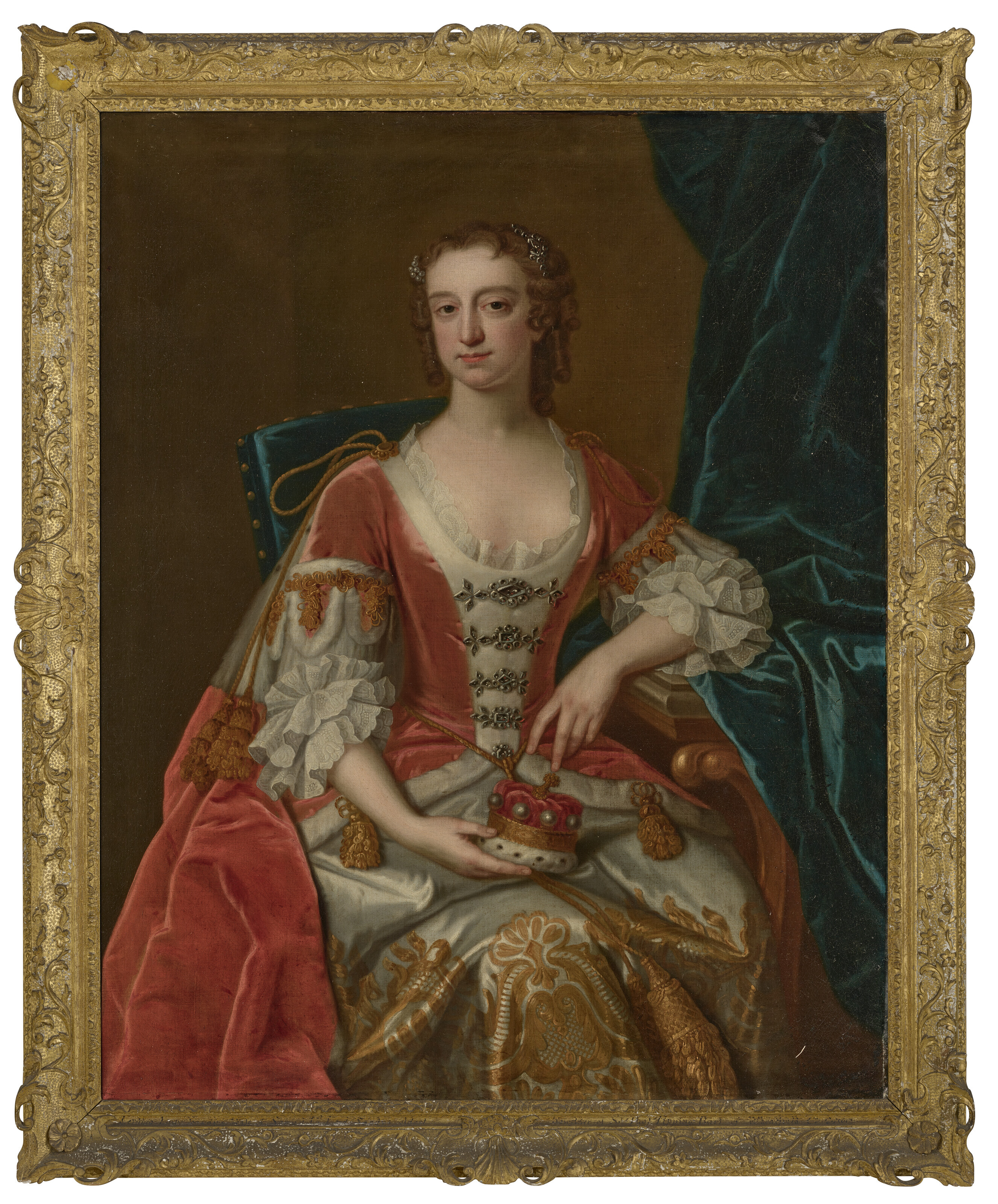
Portrait of Letitia, Lady Sandys by Enoch Seeman

On 9 June 1725 Sandys married Letitia, eldest daughter and co-heiress of Sir Thomas Tipping Bt MP and his wife Anne Cheke. They had seven sons and three daughters:

- Edwin Sandys (28 April 1726 – 11 March 1797), MP, succeeded as the 2nd Baron Sandys in 1770
- Cheek Sandys (1727–1737)
- Thomas Sandys (born 30 September 1728, London, died in infancy)
- Martin Sandys (baptised 24 November 1729, Ombersley – 26 December 1768), Colonel, Equerry to the Duke of Cumberland
  - Martin's daughter Mary (wife of Arthur Hill, 2nd Marquess of Downshire) inherited the Ombersley estates upon the 2nd Baron's death in 1797, and was granted a new Sandys barony in 1802.
- Letitia Sandys (baptised 25 August 1731, Ombersley – 10 January 1784)
- William Sandys (baptised 5 August 1732, Ombersley – 31 October 1749)
- Anne Sandys (born 10 January 1734 – 1797) married Christopher Bethell
- John Sandys (baptised 31 October 1735, Ombersley – 1758), soldier, died in Germany
- Katherine Sandys (baptised 25 September 1736, died in infancy)
- Henry Sandys (baptised 4 July 1737, Ombersley, died in infancy)

== Bibliography ==
- Cokayne, George E. (1896). "Sandys of Ombersley". Complete peerage of England, Scotland, Ireland, Great Britain and the United Kingdom, extant, extinct, or dormant. Vol. VII, S to T. George Bell & Sons. p. 54.
- Hanham, A. A. "Sandys, Samuel, first Baron Sandys of Ombersley (1695-1770)". Oxford Dictionary of National Biography (online ed.). Oxford University Press. doi:10.1093/ref:odnb/24652. (Subscription, Wikipedia Library access or UK public library membership required.)
- Horn, David Bayne; Ransome, Mary (1996). English Historical Documents 1714-1783. Vol. 7. Routledge. ISBN 0-415-14372-1.

Parliament of Great Britain
Preceded by Samuel Swift; Thomas Wylde	Member of Parliament for Worcester; 1718–1743; With: Thomas Wylde 1718–1727; Sir Richard Lane 1727–1734; Richard Lockwood 1734–1740; Thomas Winnington 1741–1743	Succeeded by Thomas Winnington; Sir Henry Harpur, Bt
Political offices
Preceded by Sir Robert Walpole	Chancellor of the Exchequer; 1742–1743	Succeeded by Henry Pelham
Preceded by Sir Robert Walpole	Leader of the House of Commons; 1742–1743	Succeeded by Henry Pelham
Preceded by Thomas Winnington	Cofferer of the Household; 1744	Succeeded by Edmund Waller
Preceded by The Earl of Halifax	First Lord of Trade; 1761–1763	Succeeded by Charles Townshend
Legal offices
Preceded by The Duke of Leeds	Justice in Eyre south of Trent; 1756	Succeeded by The Earl of Breadalbane
Preceded by The Lord Edgcumbe	Justice in Eyre north of Trent; 1759–1761	Succeeded by The Duke of Leeds
Peerage of Great Britain
New creation	Baron Sandys; 2nd creation 1743–1770	Succeeded by Edwin Sandys
