= Henry Fleming (MP) =

British politician

Henry Fleming (1663–1713) was an English politician.

He was member of parliament (MP) for St Germans from 1690 to 1698 and from 1700 to 1708.

Parliament of England
Preceded by Daniel Eliot and Sir Walter Moyle	Member of Parliament for St Germans; 1690–1698; With: Daniel Eliot	Succeeded by Daniel Eliot and John Tanner
Preceded by Daniel Eliot and John Tanner	Member of Parliament for St Germans; 1700–1707; With: 6 others, in succession	Succeeded by Parliament of Great Britain
Parliament of Great Britain
Preceded by Parliament of England	Member of Parliament for St Germans; 1707–1708; With: Edward Eliot	Succeeded by Francis Scobell and Edward Eliot
