= Alexander Baker (MP) =

English lawyer and politician

Alexander Baker (1611 – 4 August 1685) was an English lawyer and politician who sat in the House of Commons in 1660.

Baker was the son of Alexander Baker, barber-surgeon of Channel Row, Westminster and his first wife Alice Jervoise, daughter of Edward Jervoise of Hampshire. He was baptised 25 July 1611. He was a student of Clifford's Inn in 1634 and became an attorney. He did not participate in the Civil War, although Oliver Cromwell used his house as quarters shortly before the trial of Charles I.

In April 1660, Baker became a freeman of New Windsor and was elected Member of Parliament for Windsor for the Convention Parliament. He was commissioner for assessment for Berkshire from August 1660 to 1661. In 1661, he stood again at Windsor and although returned by the burgesses at large he was not supported by the corporation and the House decided in favour of the corporation. He spent the rest of his life "in peaceful retirement".

Baker married Elizabeth Farrer, daughter of Thomas Farrer of Harrold, Bedfordshire by 1635 and had three daughters.

Baker died at the age of about 74 and was commemorated by a memorial inscription in Windsor parish church.

Parliament of England
Preceded by Cornelius Holland	Member of Parliament for Windsor; 1660; With: Roger Palmer	Succeeded by Sir Richard Braham; Thomas Higgons
