= Francis Winnington (lawyer) =

English lawyer and politician

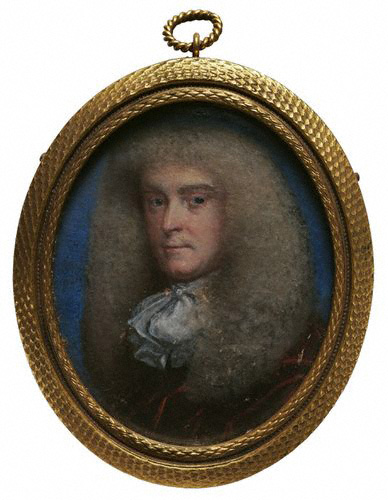
Sir Francis Winnington.

Sir Francis Winnington (7 November 1634 – 1 May 1700) was an English lawyer and politician who sat in the House of Commons at various times between 1677 and 1698. He became Solicitor-General to King Charles II.

== Biography ==
Winnington entered the Middle Temple in 1656 and was called to the bar in 1660 and rose steadily, serving as counsel in various Parliamentary impeachments. In January 1672, he became attorney-general to the king's brother, the Duke of York and was knighted on 16 December 1672. He was appointed as Solicitor General in 1675 and chosen as MP for Windsor at a by-election to the Cavalier Parliament in 1677 on the King's recommendation.

During the hysteria of the Popish Plot, Winnington's allegiances changed, and he participated in impeaching the Lord Danby. This led to his dismissal as Solicitor General. However he was elected as MP for Worcester in 1679 (twice) and again in 1681. While Parliament was not sitting, he defended political allies in the court and also the city he represented when its corporation was attacked by Quo warranto proceedings, as well as Oxford. His legal services remained in demand in the reign of James II of England. He was elected as MP for Tewkesbury in 1689, 1692 and 1695, though he had not initially sought the seat.

== Family ==
Winnington married first Elizabeth Herbert of Powick, he had a daughter Elizabeth who married in 1676 Richard Dowdeswell of Bushbury MP, his colleague in the representation of Tewkesbury.

Winnington second and last marriage was to Elizabeth, daughter of Edward Salwey and third and youngest sister and coheir of Edward Salwey, who brought him Stanford Court at Stanford-on-Teme, Worcestershire to add to property he had already bought there with his considerable earnings. (Note: Thomas Winnington (1696–1746) was his grandson. He purchased the shares of the elder sisters in the estate of Stanford, and in 1674 he bought the leasehold interest under the crown of the manor of Bewdley. The Elizabethan mansion of Stanford Court was burnt on 5 December 1882, and the valuable books and manuscripts in the old library were destroyed.) They had four sons and three daughters, including Salwey Winnington, Francis Winnington and Edward Winnington, later Jeffreys.

== Notes ==
Legal offices
Preceded by Sir William Jones	Solicitor General for England and Wales; 1674–1679	Succeeded by Heneage Finch
Parliament of England
Preceded by Sir Richard Braham, 1st Baronet; Thomas Higgons	Member of Parliament for Windsor; 1677–1679; With: Thomas Higgons	Succeeded by Sir John Ernle; John Powney
Preceded by Thomas Street; Sir Rowland Berkeley	Member of Parliament for Worcester; 1679–1685; With: Thomas Street 1679–1681; Henry Herbert 1681–1685	Succeeded by William Bromley; Bridges Nanfan
Preceded by Richard Dowdeswell; Henry Capell	Member of Parliament for Tewkesbury; 1692–1698; With: Thomas Higgons	Succeeded by Sir John Ernle; John Powney
