= The Seven Stars, Holborn =

Listed pub in London, England

The Seven Stars
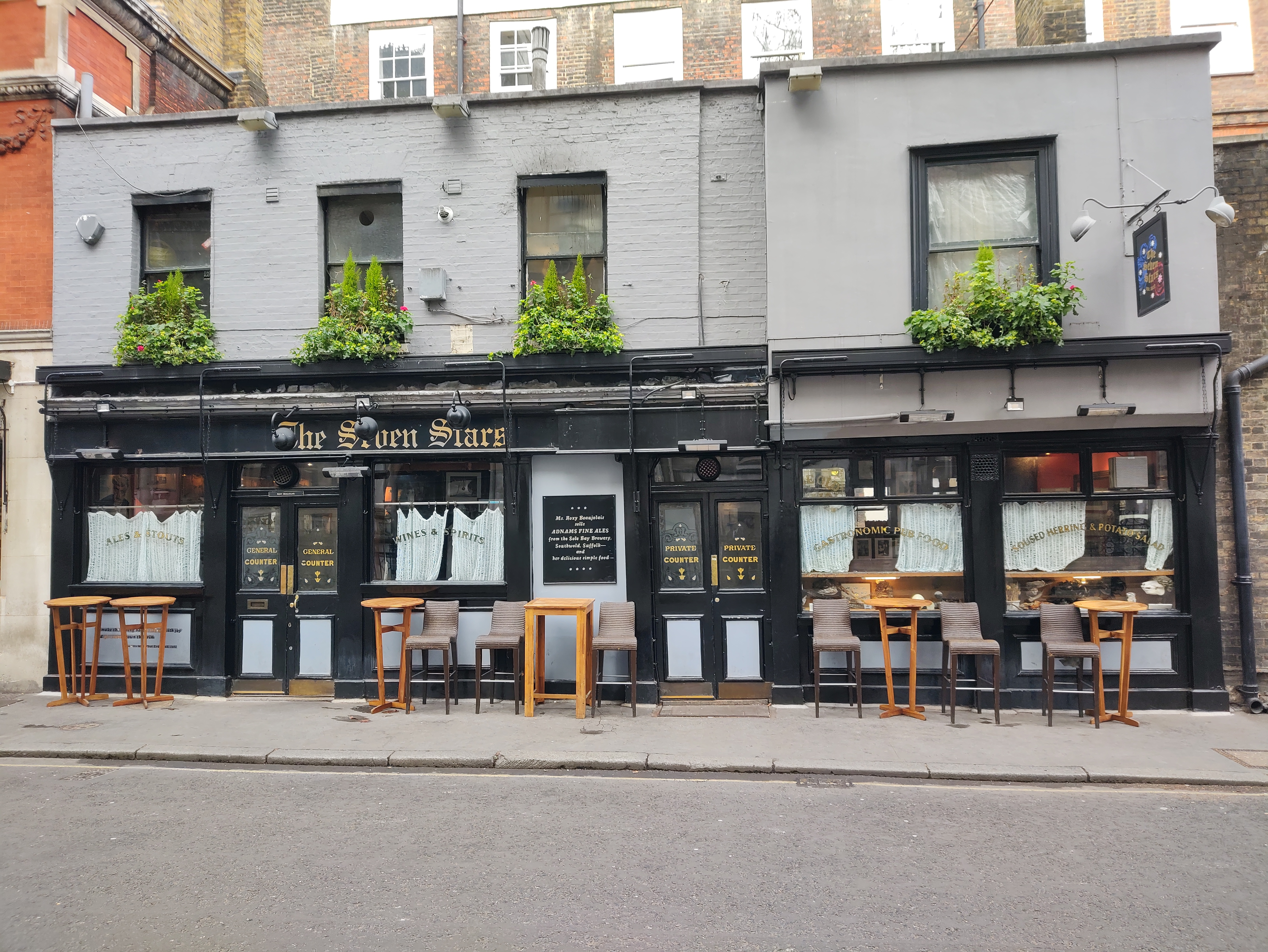
- The pub in 2022

- Location within London Borough of Camden Location within Greater London
- Former names: Log and Seven Stars; League of Seven Stars

General information
- Type: Public house
- Location: 51–54 Carey Street, Holborn London, England
- Coordinates: 51.514950°N 0.11360747°W
- Year built: 17th century
- Owner: Fuller's

Design and construction
- Designations

Listed Building – Grade II
- Official name: Seven Stars public house
- Designated: 14 May 1974
- Reference no.: 1244097

Website
- thesevenstars1602.co.uk

The Seven Stars is a Grade II listed public house on Carey Street in Holborn, London, England. The pub may have origins dating from 1602, although the present building is generally thought to date largely from the late 17th century. It is noted for its well-preserved Victorian interior and is included on the Campaign for Real Ale (CAMRA)'s National Inventory of Historic Pub Interiors, where it is rated as having "outstanding national historic importance".

== History ==
According to its official listing, the pub, formerly known as the Log and Seven Stars, may have 17th-century origins, possibly dating from 1602, and has been altered and extended over time. While the frontage bears the date 1602, another source suggests that the present building is more likely to date from the 1680s. The Campaign for Real Ale (CAMRA) states that the pub was formerly known as the League of Seven Stars, a name said to refer to the seven provinces of the Netherlands, and its early customers included Dutch sailors who had settled locally. CAMRA also records traditions that Shakespeare may have visited the pub while attending performances at nearby Middle Temple, and that Charles Dickens may have drawn inspiration from it when creating the Magpie and Stump public house in The Pickwick Papers.

On 14 May 1974, the Seven Stars was designated a Grade II listed building. CAMRA regards it as having an interior of "outstanding national historic importance" and awards it a three-star rating on its National Inventory of Historic Pub Interiors. As of November 2025, the freehold was owned by Fuller's and the pub was leased by Roxy Beaujolais Ltd.

== Architecture ==
=== Exterior ===
The building has brick walls, some of which conceal an earlier timber-framed structure, beneath a slate roof. It has two storeys and an attic, with a four-window frontage. The wider bay at the right end projects slightly from the main façade and may originally have been a separate building. The ground floor retains a 19th-century pub frontage with four windows and two doorways separated by pilasters and fitted with panelled bases beneath the windows. The upper floor contains recessed sash windows, while the projecting bay has a more elaborate window surround with decorative detailing.

=== Interior ===
The interior in 2025

The ground floor contains two rooms. Both retain 19th-century bar fittings with mirrored backs, and the larger bar also has built-in cupboards. The bar counters in both rooms date from the same period. Etched and gilded glass survives in two doors labelled "Private Counter" and "General Counter", an unusual feature reflecting the pub's historic division into separate drinking areas served from a shared servery. The room on the right contains a corner fireplace from around 1900, with matching woodwork extending as shelves along the side walls and beneath the windows. The ceilings have narrow beams, also dating from around 1900, which conceal earlier structural timbers. A narrow staircase to the upper floors is located behind the main bar. Three historic advertising mirrors are also retained.

== In popular culture ==
The interior served as a filming location for a scene in the 2022 film All the Old Knives.

== See also ==
- List of pubs in London
