= Richard Foley (politician) =

English lawyer and politician

Richard Foley (19 February 1681 – 27 March 1732) was an English lawyer and politician who sat in the House of Commons from 1711 to 1732.

Foley was son of Thomas Foley of Witley Court, Worcestershire, and thus a grandson of the ironmaster Thomas Foley. His elder brothers were Thomas and Edward. He was admitted at Lincoln's Inn in 1695 and called to the bar in 1702.

Foley was second prothonotary at the Court of Common Pleas from 1703 until his death. He was elected a Fellow of the Royal Society in 1708, but withdrew in 1712. He was made a bencher of his Inn in 1726.

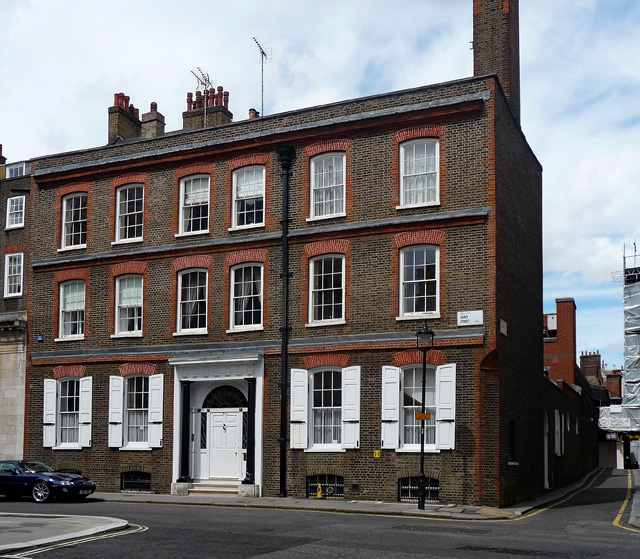
60 Carey Street in Holborn, built for Foley in 1730.

Foley was returned as Member of Parliament for Droitwich at a by-election on 18 July 1711 on the family interest, and was returned unopposed again at the 1713 general election. He was returned unopposed at the 1715, 1722 and 1727 general elections and sat until his death in 1732. In Parliament he voted consistently with the Opposition. He was both preceded and succeeded in the seat by his brother Edward.

Foley died unmarried without issue on 27 March 1732 and his considerable estate passed to his elder brother Edward.

Parliament of Great Britain
Preceded by Edward Foley; Edward Winnington (later Jeffreys)	Member of Parliament for Droitwich; 1711–1732; With: Edward Winnington (later Jeffreys) 1711–1726; Thomas Winnington 1726–1732	Succeeded by Thomas Winnington; Edward Foley
