= John Brace (MP) =

English politician

John Brace (born c. 1578) was an English politician who sat in the House of Commons from 1604 to 1611.

Brace was the son of Philip Brace of Worcestershire. He matriculated at Exeter College, Oxford on 8 November 1594 aged 16. In 1604, he was elected Member of Parliament for Droitwich. Brace was of Hill Court, Worcestershire. He married Cecily Sandys daughter of Sir Samuel Sandys of Ombersley. He had sons Philip and Edwin.

Parliament of England
| Preceded by John Buck; Humphrey Wheler | Member of Parliament for Droitwich; 1604–1611; With: George Wylde I | Succeeded by Edwin Sandys; Ralph Clare |
