= The George, Twickenham =

Pub in Twickenham, London

Coordinates: 51°26′46″N 0°19′45″W

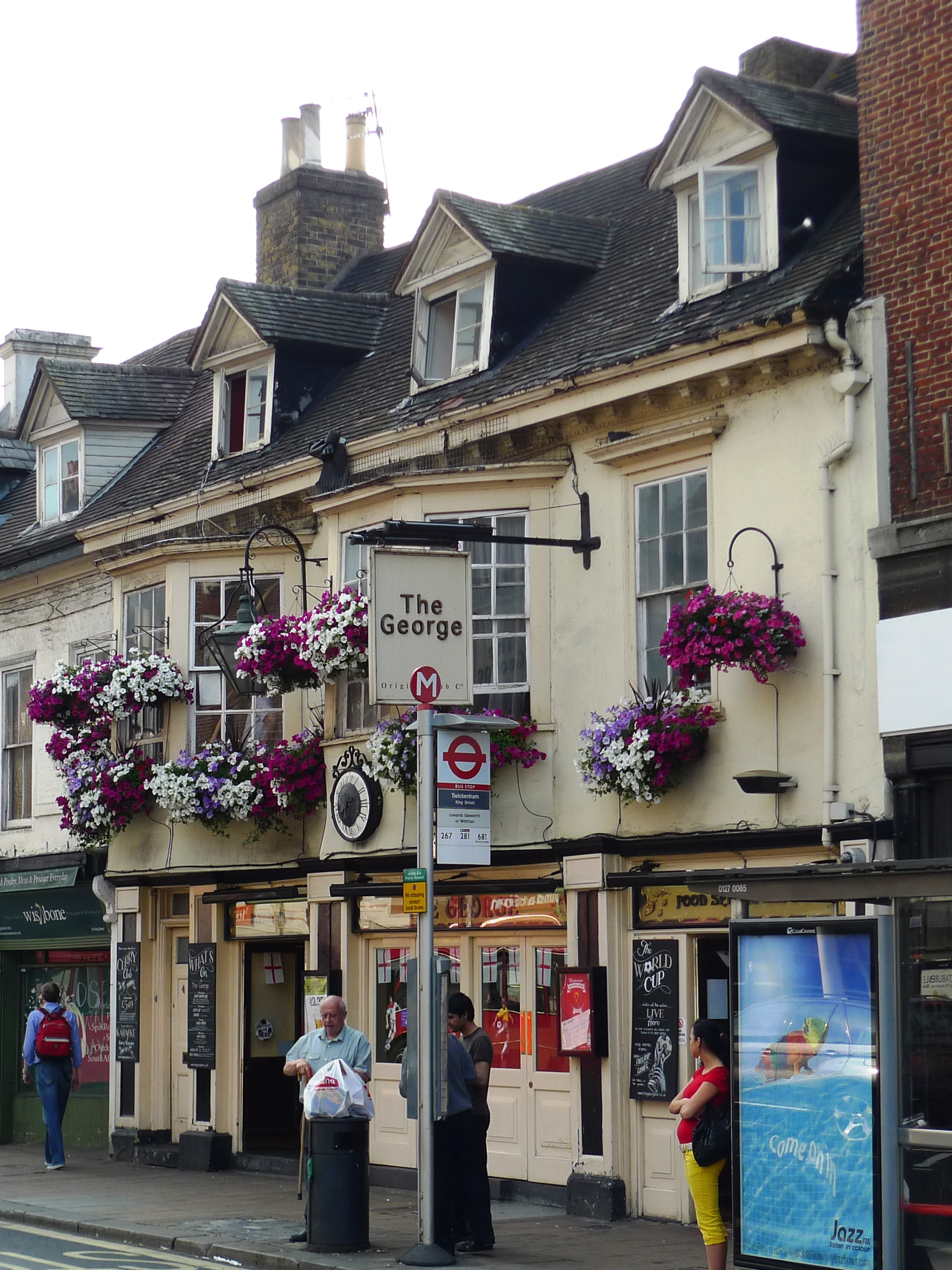

- Location within London Borough of Richmond upon Thames

General information
- Type: Public house
- Location: 32 King Street, Twickenham TW1 3SN (in the (London Borough of Richmond upon Thames)

Listed Building – Grade II
- Official name: The George public house
- Designated: 25 June 1983
- Reference no.: 1065375

The George is a Grade II listed public house in Twickenham, in the London Borough of Richmond upon Thames. It is in three adjoining buildings at 32–36 King Street, parts of which date from the late 17th century. It has been operating as a pub since 1726.
