= Francis Newport (fl. 1559) =

English politician

Francis Newport (fl. 1559) was an English politician.

He was a member (MP) of the parliament of England for Droitwich in 1559.
