= Sir Walter Blount, 1st Baronet =

Arms of Blount: Barry nebuly of six or and sable

Sir Walter Blount, 1st Baronet (1594 – 27 August 1654) of Sodington in the parish of Mamble in Worcestershire, was a Member of Parliament for Droitwich in 1624 and supported the Royalist cause in the Civil War.

== Origins ==
Blount was the eldest son of Sir George Blount, Knight, of Sodington in Worcestershire by his wife Eleanor Norwood, a daughter of William Norwood of Leckhampton of Gloucestershire, and Elizabeth Lygon, daughter of William Lygon and Eleanor Dennis.

== Career ==
He matriculated at Balliol College, Oxford on 12 October 1610 aged 16 and entered the Inner Temple in 1611. He served as Sheriff of Worcestershire in 1620. In 1624 he was elected Member of Parliament for Droitwich. He was created a baronet on 5 October 1642. He was a Royalist during the Civil War and was taken prisoner by the Parliamentarian forces at Hereford in December 1645, and was imprisoned at Oxford and in the Tower of London. His house at Sodington was burnt down by Parliamentarian soldiers and his estates were confiscated on 2 November 1652 and sold in 1655.

== Marriage and children ==
Blount married Elizabeth Wylde (c. 1591–1656), a daughter of George Wylde of Droitwich, Serjeant-at-Law, by his wife Frances Huddleston, by whom he had 13 children, including:

- Sir George Blount, 2nd Baronet (died 1667), eldest son and heir, who married Mary Kirkham, only daughter and heiress of Richard Kirkham of Blagdon in the parish of Paignton in Devon, by his wife the heiress of Oldham near Tilbury in Essex. Blagdon remained a seat of the Blount family until it was sold to Montagu Edmund Parker (1737–1831) of Whiteway House, near Chudleigh in Devon, Sheriff of Devon in 1789. A plasterwork heraldic escutcheon dated 1708 survives in the great hall of Blagdon showing the initials "EB" for Edward Blount (d. 1726) (3rd son of 2nd Bt.) the Latin motto Lux Tua Via Mea ("Your light is my path") and the arms of Blount (Barry nebuly of six or and sable) impaling Gules, seven mascles vair 3,3,1 (Guise). Edward Blount (d. 1726) married Anne Guise, a daughter of Sir John Guise, 2nd Baronet. In 1727 his 2nd daughter Mary Blount (1701/2 – 1773) married Edward Howard, 9th Duke of Norfolk.
- Eleanor Blount, who married firstly Robert Knightley, and secondly Walter Aston, 3rd Lord Aston of Forfar.

== Death and burial ==
Blount died aged 60 at Blagdon in the parish of Paignton in Devon, the home of his daughter-in-law Mary Kirkham, and was buried at Paignton on 29 August 1654.

Parliament of England
Preceded by Thomas Coventry; John Wilde	Member of Parliament for Droitwich; 1624; With: John Wilde	Succeeded by Thomas Coventry; John Wilde
Baronetage of England
New creation	Baronet (of Sodington); 1624–1654	Succeeded by George Blount
