= Edward Salwey =

English lawyer and politician

Edward Salwey (born c. 1603) was an English lawyer and politician who sat in the House of Commons in 1659.

Salwey was the son of Humphrey Salwey of Stanford Court, Stanford-on-Teme and his wife Anne Littleton, daughter of Sir Edward Littleton. He matriculated at Brasenose College, Oxford on 10 November 1621 aged 18. He was called to the bar at the Inner Temple in 1635. In 1656 he was commissioner for assessment for Worcestershire. In 1659, he was elected Member of Parliament for Droitwich in the Third Protectorate Parliament.

Salwey married Dorothy Dryden, daughter of Sir Erasmus Dryden, 1st Baronet of Canons Ashby House, Northamptonshire. His daughter Elizabeth married Francis Winnington.

Parliament of England
Preceded by Not represented in Second Protectorate Parliament	Member of Parliament for Droitwich; 1659	Succeeded by Not represented in Restored Rump
