= John Chetwynd (disambiguation) =

John Chetwynd was MP for Stafford.

John Chetwynd may also refer to:

- John Chetwynd (c. 1390–c. 1448), MP for Warwickshire (UK Parliament constituency)
- John Chetwynd, 2nd Viscount Chetwynd

== See also ==
- John Chetwynd-Talbot, 1st Earl Talbot (1749–1793), British peer and politician
- John Chetwynd-Talbot, 21st Earl of Shrewsbury (1914–1980), British peer
