= Thomas Foley, 1st Baron Foley =

Thomas Foley, 1st Baron Foley may refer to:

- Thomas Foley, 1st Baron Foley (1673–1733), first baron of the first creation
- Thomas Foley, 1st Baron Foley (1716–1777), first baron of the second creation

== See also ==
- Thomas Foley (disambiguation)
