= Thomas Foley, 2nd Baron Foley =

Thomas Foley, 2nd Baron Foley may refer to:

- Thomas Foley, 2nd Baron Foley (1703–1766), second baron of the first creation
- Thomas Foley, 2nd Baron Foley (1742–1793), second baron of the second creation

== See also ==
- Thomas Foley (disambiguation)
