= William Rea (ironmaster) =

English ironmaster (1662 – before 1957)

William Rea (1662–1750?) was a British ironmaster, owner or partner in many ironworks.

== Background ==
He was born on 24 February 1662 and he may have been the son of Richard Rea, manager of the Foley family's steelworks in and about the Forest of Bob (the Forest Partnership).

== Ironmaster ==
In the early 18th century he was the managing partner of the Foley steelworks from 1690 to 1725, and an important figure in coal iron production.

In this role, he succeeded John Wheeler. He appears as a manager of Wilden Forge about 1692, and was managing some forges near the Forest of Dean for John Wheeler and Obadiah Lane from about 1701. It is thought that he was John Wheeler's chief clerk. After Wheeler's death, Rea married one of his daughters.

Rea seems to have managed the business of the Forest Partnership successfully, with some oversight from Richard Avenant and then Richard Knight of Bringewood Ironworks (near Ludlow, Shropshire). After the death of Philip Foley in 1716, his children sold out, as did Richard Knight who had become a partner in about 1709. That left as partners just John Wheeler II and Thomas Foley, the eldest son of Paul Foley and Auditor of the Imposts (an Exchequer sinecure).

== Financial losses ==
In 1717, an embargo was placed on British trade with Sweden. As a substantial part of the iron used in Britain was imported from Sweden, there was a shortage of it and the price rose. This meant large potential profits for English ironmasters, such as Rea. But to make more iron, they needed more charcoal. The price of cordwood from which charcoal was made is also likely to have risen. Rea bought a large quantity of wood - both cordwood and timber (i.e. large stuff suitable for house and shipbuilding) - at Holme Lacy near Hereford. He realised that the deal was too big for him and asked Thomas Foley to become his partner. The best timber was sold to the Navy for shipbuilding. The charcoal made from the cordwood no doubt went to their ironworks.

However, iron imports had only been temporarily interrupted, as Swedish iron was re-exported to England from Prussia and the Netherlands, and the embargo was lifted in 1719. The price of iron came back down, leaving Rea bound to a contract for wood at high prices. This was financially disastrous for him.

== Sacked ==
It is likely that his failure left him depressed; certainly in 1725, he was severely in arrears with providing accounts to his partners. Accordingly, the Forest Partners met at Wolverhampton and sacked him. Warine Falkner was the next manager, but his wife wanted to move back to Staffordshire to be near her family, and he left. In the time of his successor Thomas Pendrill, the business (now owned entirely by the Foley family) gradually contracted, and ended in obscurity as an unimportant concern, some time after 1751.

== Financial ruin ==
Rea's sacking was followed by litigation, mainly (but not entirely) in the Court of Exchequer. This was ultimately partly resolved by an arbitration by Warine Falkner and Edward Kendall with William Knight as umpire. The result left Rea financially ruined, with his property mortgaged to the Duke of Beaufort, to whom he ultimately surrendered it.

== Later career ==
Little is known of Rea's career after he was sacked by the Forest Partnership. He had had shares in ironworks in Cheshire and Staffordshire, at Cunsey in Furness, and in Sussex, and was evidently an important figure in the iron industry, but withdrew from (or lost) these shares during the 1720s.

He is last heard of in 1748, when he forced the sale of an estate at Wolverley. Samuel Jewkes had apparently given him a partnership in Wolverley Old Forge during the embargo and had died without paying. William Rea brought proceedings in Chancery for payment, but had to await the majority of the grandson before the estate could be sold and he could be paid. The estate was bought by William Knight's son Edward, by then an important and wealthy ironmaster in the area.

William Rea died before 2 April 1757 when William Marks of Brockham in the parish of Astley (Worcestershire), grand-nephew and heir of William Rea of Monmouth is cited in a legal case.
