= Church of All Saints, Wilden =

Coordinates: 52.3477°N 2.2596°W

All Saints, Wilden
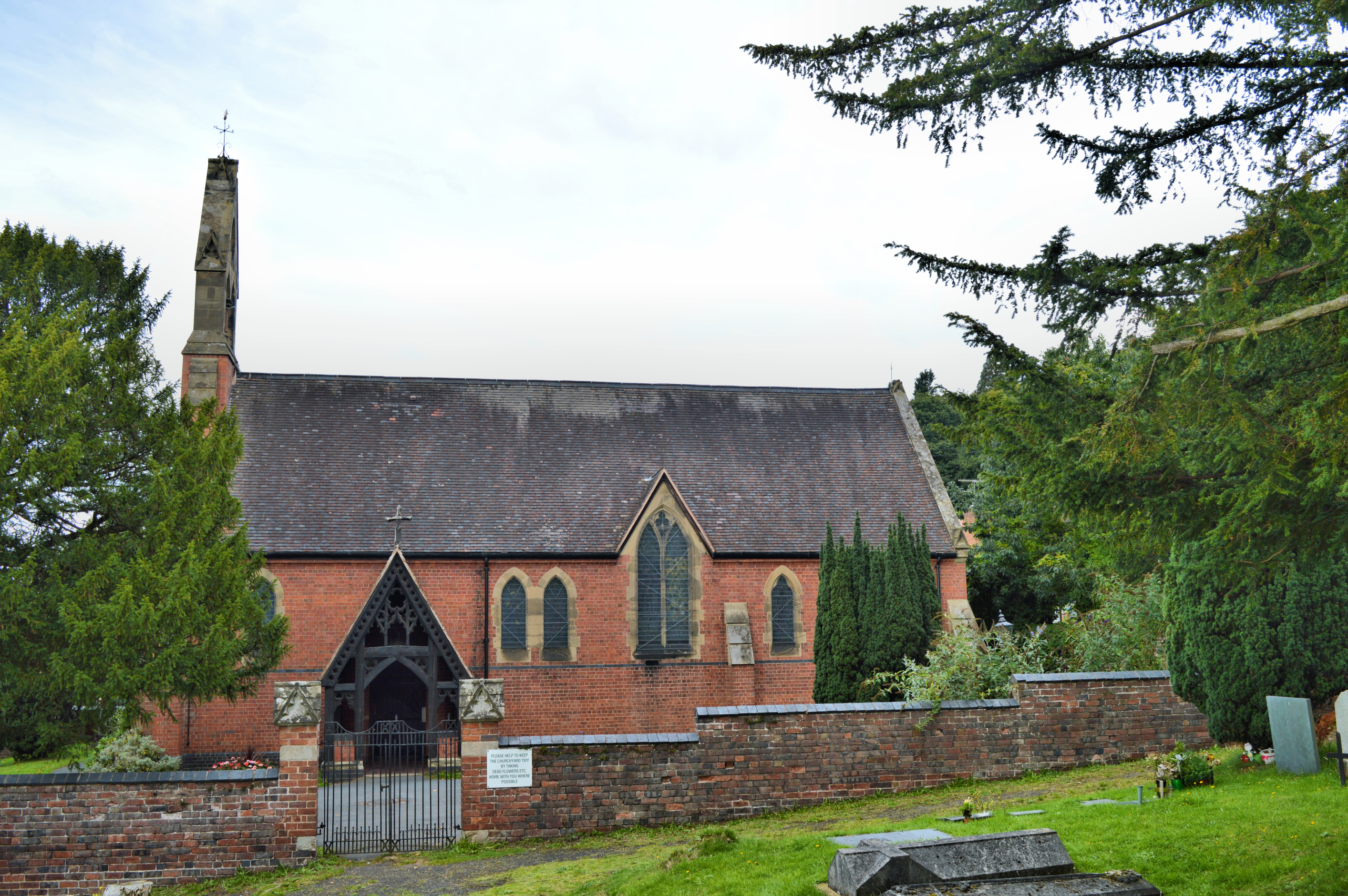
- All Saints, Wilden
- OS grid reference: SO 82419 72217
- Location: Wilden
- Country: England
- Denomination: Church of England

History
- Dedication: All Saints

Architecture
- Heritage designation: Grade II listed

All Saints Church in Wilden, Worcestershire about one mile to the north east of Stourport. It was designed by William Hopkins with funds provided by Alfred Baldwin very close to his own home, Wilden House and one of his large iron works. It served the Baldwin family and their employees and was consecrated in 1880.

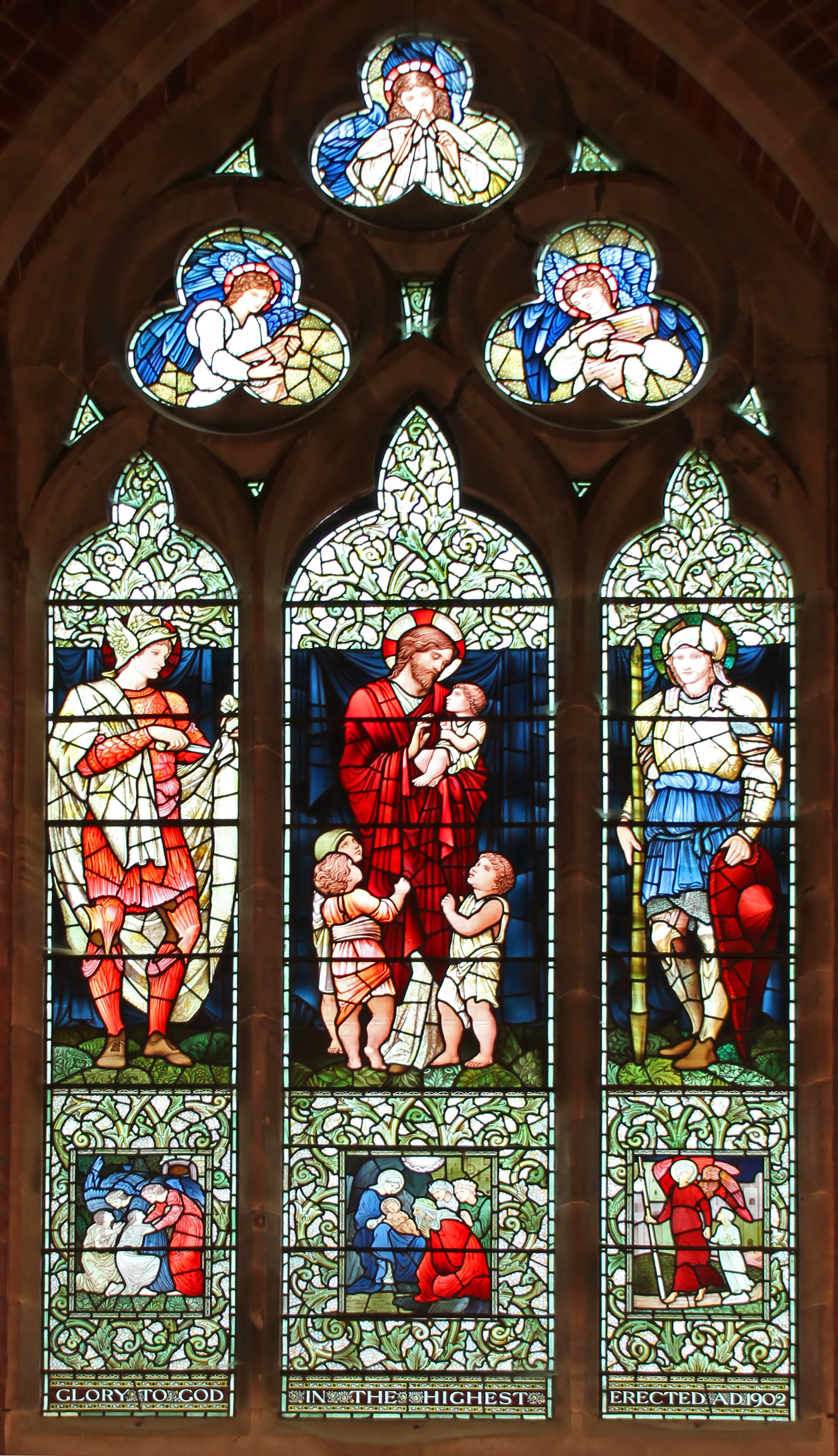
One of the windows

The church has been designated as Grade II listed by Historic England.

The original windows were replaced, between 1902 and 1914, with 14 designs by Sir Edward Burne-Jones, a brother-in-law of Alfred Baldwin. Louisa Baldwin commissioned the windows. She is buried at the church. The windows are dedicated to members of the MacDonald, Baldwin and Burne-Jones families; one shows Louisa Baldwin's only child, the future prime minister, Stanley Baldwin, setting out on life's journey accompanied by a guardian angel.

The church has been linked in pastoral oversight with the parish church of Stourport, St Michael's and All Angels, for a number of years.

== Sources ==
- The Buildings of England: Worcestershire, Nikolaus Pevsner, 1968
