= Wilden =

Wilden may refer to:

- Wilden, Bedfordshire, a village and civil parish in Bedfordshire, England
- Wilden, Worcestershire, a village in Worcestershire, England
