= Shrawley =

Village in Worcestershire, England

Coordinates: 52.281985°N 2.28473°W

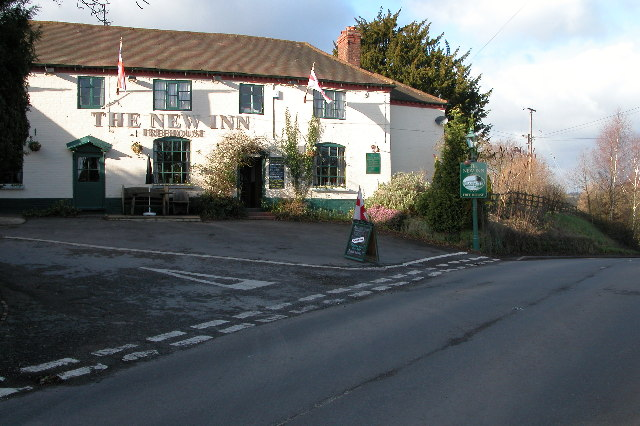
- The New Inn in Shrawley, on the B4196

- Location within Worcestershire
- Population: 356 (2001)
- OS grid reference: SO806649
- Civil parish: Shrawley
- District: Malvern Hills
- Shire county: Worcestershire
- Region: West Midlands
- Country: England
- Sovereign state: United Kingdom
- Post town: Worcester
- Postcode district: WR6
- Police: West Mercia
- Fire: Hereford and Worcester
- Ambulance: West Midlands
- UK Parliament: West Worcestershire

Shrawley is a village and civil parish in the Malvern Hills District in the county of Worcestershire, England. The village is situated on the western bank of the River Severn. The northern and southern boundaries of the parish are two small tributaries of the River Severn, Dick Brook to the north and Shrawley Brook to the south. To the west is Hillhampton, the north west and north is the parish of Astley and to the south Holt.

The B4196 road runs throughout the village from the A433 at the Holt Heath boundary in the south to the Astley boundary at Glazenbridge on Dick Brook in the north.

There are 22 miles of footpaths around Shrawley.

== Education ==
Shrawley Primary School closed in 1977 (is now the village hall) and all the children of the village, between 4 and 11 years old, go to the CoE school at Great Witley. On leaving Great Witley school the 11 to 16s go on to The Chantry School at Martley.

== History ==
The name Shrawley derives from the Old English scræflēah or scræfenlēah, meaning 'wood/clearing by a cave' or 'wood/clearing with caves'.

Following the Norman conquest of England, what is now known as Shrawley was part of the lower division of the Doddingtree Hundred. It consisted of a series of scattered hamlets, and as such did not appear in the Domesday Book of 1086. The main hamlets were Frog Pool, Great Shrawley, Noutard's Green and Sankyns Green.

In 1645 the number of Civil War deserters increased rapidly and Shrawley Wood was said to swarm with bandits and refugees. Close to the River Severn within Shrawley Woods are the remains of Oliver Mount, a former castle. In its ruins was found a piece of stone with carving matching the font in the church.

In 1700 the Manor of Shrawley came up for sale by the Cliffe family, and after investigating the prospects, which included timber from Shrawley Great Wood of over 300 acres (1.2 km^{2}), Thomas Vernon (1665–1721), of Hanbury Hall, acquired it for £13,000, equivalent to £2.31 million in June 2014.

Following the Poor Law Amendment Act 1834 Shrawley Parish ceased to be responsible for maintaining the poor in its parish. This responsibility was transferred to Martley Poor Law Union.

Shrawley remained an important Vernon family possession through to about 1980 when the heir to the last member of the Vernon family, living in Shrawley Wood House, died.

The village hall was built in 1860 as a National School.

== Population ==
The following is a partial history of the population of Shrawley, recorded at censuses since 1871:

Census	Population
1871	519
1901	414
1921	384
1931	414
1981	348
2001	355
2011	423

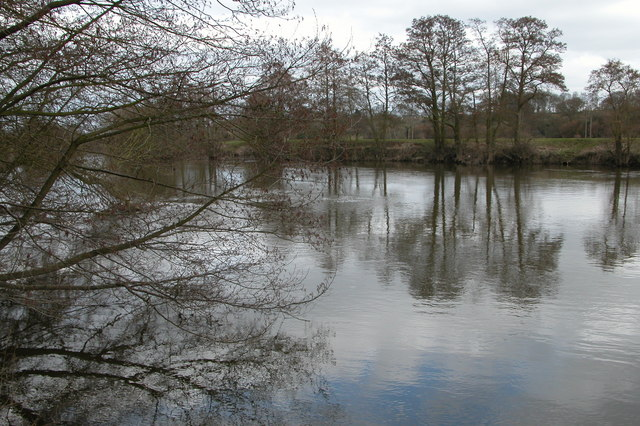
View of the River Severn from the eastern edge of Shrawley Wood

== Shrawley Wood ==
In 1955 Shrawley Wood (103.1 hectares or 254.8 acres), was designated as a Site of Special Scientific Interest because of its Biological interest. The site was selected because it is a large tract of ancient woodland almost completely dominated by coppiced Small-leaved Lime. "...This type of woodland is a feature of eastern England and its occurrence here is unusual in the West Midlands. The woodland also has a long history of management with records going back to the beginning of the eighteenth century. ... The streams and pools included in this site add to the site's conservation value ... the rare soft hornwort occurs in one of the pools. Over 400 species of fungi have been recorded in the woodland. ...".

== Church of St Mary ==
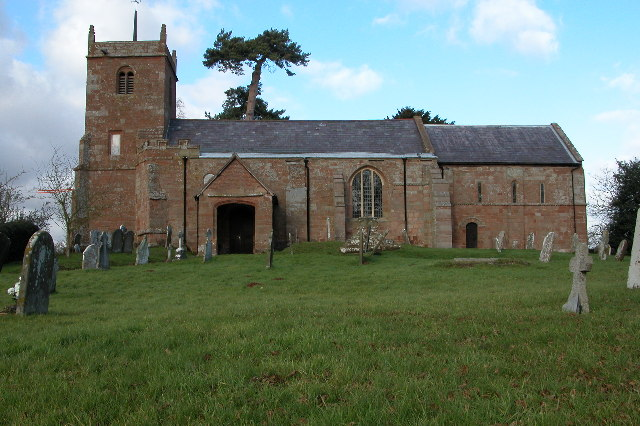
St Mary's church

The parish church, St Mary, dates back to around 1100 and is a Grade I listed building. It has 14th- and 15th-century windows and crenellated parapets, 16th-century south porch, 17th-century tower and 19th-century work throughout show continuous development of the building.

On 1 April 1978 the ownership of the Rector's Glebe Land, in Shrawley, which consisted of 128 acres of land and a small wood was transferred from the Rector's ownership to that of the Diocese of Worcester, in line with the rest of the UK.

In the autumn of 1978 the ecclesiastical Parish of Shrawley was amalgamated with that of the neighbouring parish of St Michael's, Great Witley, together with its chapel in Little Witley, to form a single parish of Shrawley and The Witleys and with Abberley to form a united Benefice. Shrawley church is in the Stourport Deanery.

The church has a virtually complete set of high box pews.

The reredos is by William Percival Starmer (1877–1961). Behind and above the reredos is a stained glass window by James Powell and Sons installed in 1921.

On the west wall of the West End Gallery are the coat of arms of George III. and two hatchments. The most southern of these that of Thomas Shrawley Vernon.

On the right hand of the doors, in the porch, is a Norman holy water stoup which survived the Reformation.

Immediately on the left inside the church is a Norman font with trumpet scallop carving and an elaborate 17th century wooden conical cover.

Just outside the porch of the church is a base of a medieval stone cross. This is a Scheduled Ancient Monument. The cross itself was destroyed during the Civil War. It is now mounted by a horizontal sundial made by Samuel Thorp in 1819 and inscribed, "Ab Hoc Momento pendet Aeternitas." It has been suggested that the cross may have been used by peripatetic priests, as a Preaching cross, before the church building and the church itself was deliberated built to the north of the cross itself beyond the shadow of the cross.

The tower contains a ring of 6 bells.
