= Dick Brook =

Stream in Worcestershire, England

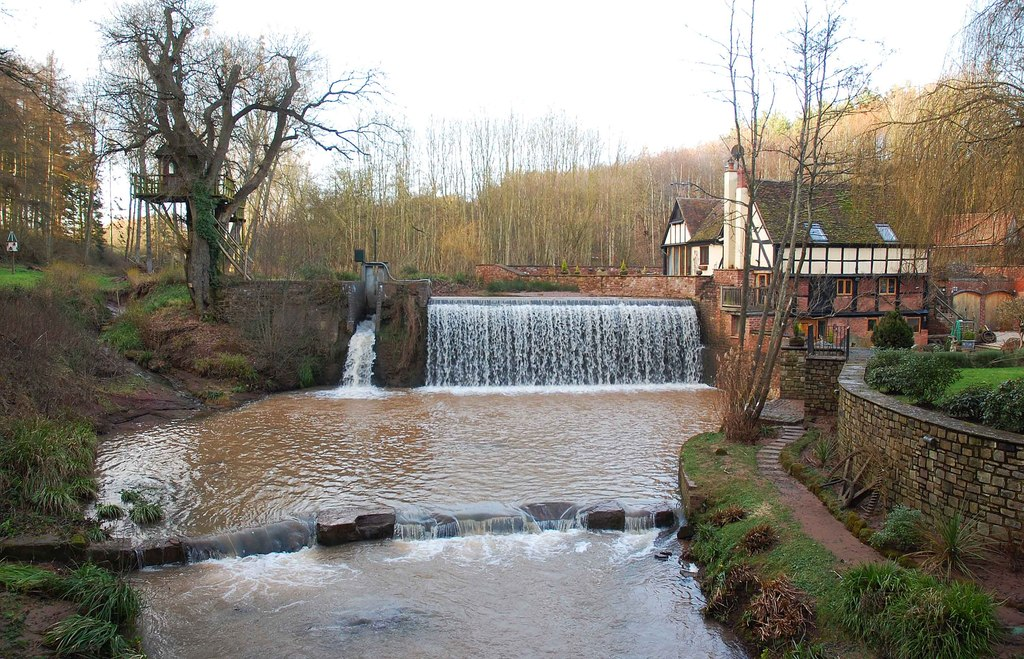
- Priors Mill

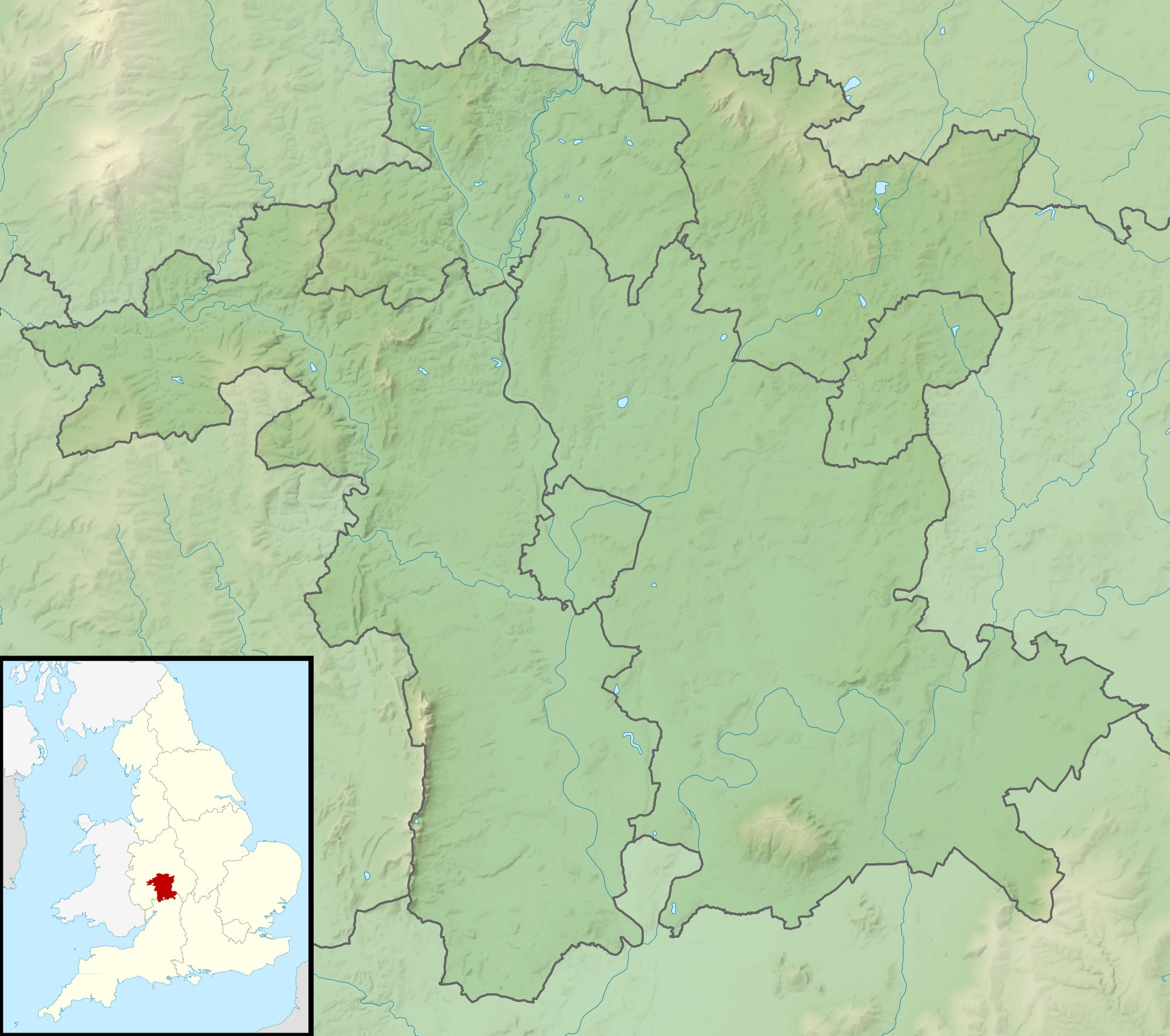
- Location within Worcestershire

Location
- Country: England
- Counties: Worcestershire

Physical characteristics
- Source confluence: Joans Hole
- Mouth
  - location: River Severn, Worcestershire
  - coordinates: 52.298°N 2.276°W
- Length: 7.5 km (4.7 mi)
- Basin size: 38 km^{2} (15 sq mi)

Dick Brook is small tributary stream of the River Severn that flows through Worcestershire, England.

The brook is formed from two small unnamed streams that converge at Joan’s Hole to the west of Dunley. The longest of these streams drains the area around Rock, with a source near Clows Top. From Joan’s Hole the named brook flows generally south-east for a total distance of 4.7 miles (7.5 km). At the edge of the village of Astley it was dammed to power Priors Mill, and then to the south of the village, at New Bridge it is crossed by a packhorse bridge, below the monastery at Glasshampton. To the north of Noutard's Green it passes beneath Glazen Bridge (B4196), and along the northern edge of Shrawley wood, until it joins the River Severn.

The drainage basin for the brook, which lies between that of the Gladder Brook to the north, and that of the Shrawley Brook to the south, has an area of 38 square kilometres (15 mi^{2}).

A very short section of Dick Brook was canalized about 1717 to enable small boats to travel up stream from the River Severn to Astley Forge. Two flash locks were constructed and the date 1717 is visible on one of these lock chambers.
