= Samuel Thorp =

British clockmaker

Samuel Thorp, or Thorpe, (c. 1765 – 1838) was a clockmaker born in Madeley, Shropshire. He was baptized 6 January and became apprenticed in 1780 to a renowned Shrewsbury Clockmaker Robert Webster. On 20 December 1790 he married Mary Newall at Ford, Shropshire . Samuel Thorp died in 1838 and was buried in Abberley Churchyard in Worcestershire on 15 February. Mary joined him there on 19 February 1843.

== Works ==
- Great Witley. In April 2010 the restored Samuel Thorp clock went on display in the crypt. It was commissioned by Thomas Foley, 3rd Baron Foley in 1804 and served both Witley Court and the parish until 1877 when it was replaced by the present clock.
- Shrawley Just outside the porch of the church is a base of a medieval stone cross. This is a Scheduled Ancient Monument. The cross itself was destroyed during the Civil War. It is now mounted by a horizontal sundial made by Samuel Thorp in 1819 and inscribed, "Ab Hoc Momento pendet Aeternitas."
- Stourport-on-Severn One of his most notable clocks adorns the yacht club at Stourport-on-Severn. It was erected in 1813 and paid for by public subscription.
