= Wilden Ironworks =

Ironworks in Worcestershire, England

The Wilden Ironworks was an ironworks in Wilden, Worcestershire, England. It operated for many years and was acquired by the Baldwin family, ancestors of British Prime Minister Stanley Baldwin.

== Wilden Mill ==
Wilden was part of the demesne of the Bishop of Worcester's manor of Hartlebury. A mill was built on the River Stour in 1511 by William Baylly, a fuller. It was thus presumably a fulling mill.

== Foley Ironworks ==
In 1647, it was referred to as having (or rather having had) six walk stocks and two corn mills. In fact, in about 1633, it had been converted to include a slitting mill. This was bought by Richard Foley, who subsequently gave it to his son Thomas. In 1647, he built a finery forge there, and when his eldest son another Thomas renewed the lease in 1685, it was described as having a slitting mill and two forges.

This was one of a number of ironworks in the lower Stour valley that depended on pig iron brought up the River Severn from the Forest of Dean and elsewhere. It produced bar iron and wrought iron for manufacture into finished iron goods, such as nails, in the Black Country.

Operation of the ironworks passed in 1669 with the rest of the older Thomas's Midlands ironworks to his youngest son Philip Foley, and he operated them until 1679, when he arranged for his brother to lease the works to Richard Avenant and John Wheeler, who had been his managers. They ran them until 1692 when a new partnership, 'Ironworks in Partnership', was formed between Philip Foley, his brother Paul, Avenant, Wheeler, and Wheeler's brother Richard, with John Wheeler as managing partner. Richard withdrew in 1698, taking over certain other ironworks on his own. In 1705, the partnership gave up its last ironworks in the Midlands, when William Rea of a new partnership.

== An estate enterprise ==
The forge lease was transferred to Richard Knight of Bringewood for its final years. When it expired in 1708, the landlord used it himself. He was the third Thomas Foley of Great Witley, who was in 1712 created Lord Foley to enable Robert Harley to have a majority in the House of Lords. His son Thomas 2nd Lord Foley operated it until his death in 1766, when it passed with the rest of the Great Witley estates to his distant cousin (descended from Paul Foley), Thomas Foley of Stoke Edith, who was created Lord Foley in 1776, the year before he died.

== Blaenavon link ==
Lord Foley probably leased the forge to Thomas Hill & Co. from Michaelmas 1776. In 1789, this firm leased coal and ironstone mines at Blaenavon in Monmouthshire, and built Blaenavon Ironworks, from which they presumably supplied pig iron to Wilden Forge. At that time, the firm comprised Thomas Hill of Stourbridge, Thomas Hopkins of Canckwood Forge near Rugeley, and Benjamin Pratt of Great Witley. Thomas Hill & Co. remained tenants until 1825, but by 1820 the works were in a distinct partnership from Blaenavon consisting of Thomas Hill and Thomas Barnet. In 1826 Henry Turner became tenant and was still in occupation in 1837, but became insane the following year. W. T. Lewty was in business there in 1840.

== Baldwins and after ==
The works were acquired by E., P. & W. Baldwin, who had previously had an iron foundry at Stourport. In 1870, Alfred Baldwin bought out his relatives to become the sole proprietor of the firm, but continued to trade under the old name. In 1888 he brought his 21-year-old son Stanley Baldwin, who would later become Prime Minister of the United Kingdom, into the business. The firm was incorporated as E. P. & W. Baldwin Ltd in 1898, and gradually acquired other tinplate works, mainly in South Wales. Eventually in 1948, it amalgamated with Richard Thomas & Co., to form Richard Thomas and Baldwins Ltd. They decided to close the Wilden Works (by then a tinplate works), declaring the workforce, many of whom lived in the village of Wilden redundant. The works were acquired in 1964 by Wilden Industrial Estates Ltd, and it became an industrial estate, which it remains today.

== Transport links ==
The works had the benefit of unusual transport link. There are the remains of a lock at Pratt's Wharf (miss-named Platts Wharf by the Ordnance Survey) on the Staffordshire and Worcestershire Canal, connecting the canal with the river, enabling canal barges to use the River Stour to deliver goods to the works. The wharf was built by Isaac Pratt from Henwick, Worcester in 1835. He is described as businessman and merchant. It was chiefly used to carry timber to a steam saw-mill in Wilden. Later it was used to transport coal and iron to the Wilden Works. There were two houses at Pratt's Wharf, one occupied by a lock keeper and the other by a clerk. The link was closed c1950.

== See also ==
- Thomas Foley (1616–1677)
- Philip Foley
- George Pearce Baldwin
- Alfred Baldwin
- Stanley Baldwin

== Note ==
The basis for this article includes unpublished sources, including certain Worcester Episcopal archives in Worcestershire Record Office; archives of Earl Baldwin (by his kind permission) also there; and those of the Foley family (also by permission) in Herefordshire Record Offices.
