= Hillhampton =

Hamlet in Worcestershire, England

Coordinates: 52.290314°N 2.326891°W

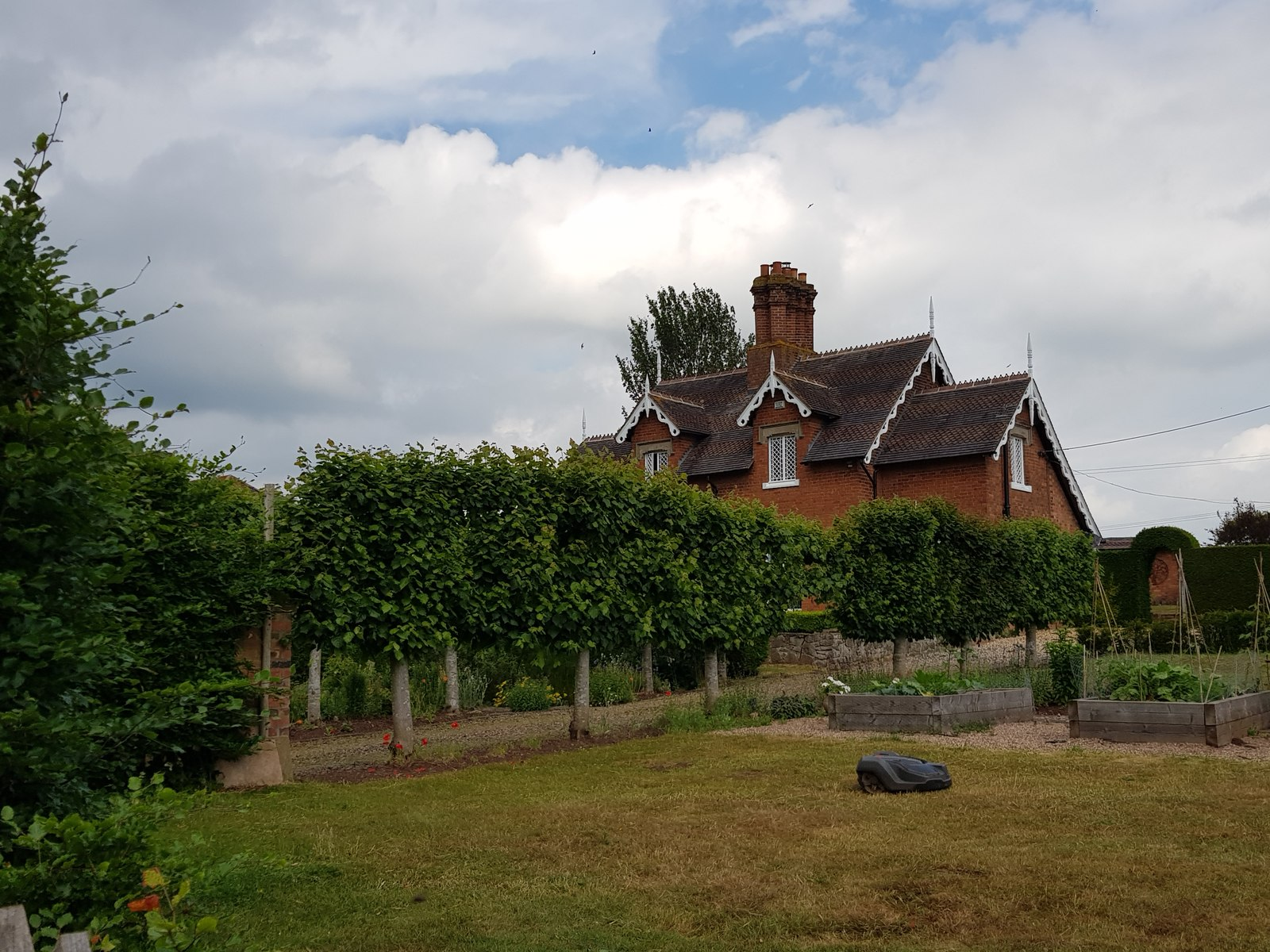
- Lower Hillhampton

- Location within Worcestershire
- Population: 128
- OS grid reference: SO779653
- Civil parish: Hillhampton
- District: Malvern Hills
- Shire county: Worcestershire
- Region: West Midlands
- Country: England
- Sovereign state: United Kingdom
- Post town: WORCESTER
- Postcode district: WR6
- Police: West Mercia
- Fire: Hereford and Worcester
- Ambulance: West Midlands
- UK Parliament: West Worcestershire

Hillhampton is a hamlet and civil parish nestled between Great Witley, Little Witley and Shrawley in the Malvern Hills district of the county of Worcestershire, England. The parish had a population of 128 at the 2021 census.

The civil parish shares a group parish council with Great Witley, known as the Great Witley and Hillhampton Parish Council.

Hillhampton was anciently a detached hamlet of the parish of Martley, in the upper division of Doddingtree Hundred. It became a separate civil parish in 1866.

The name Hillhampton derives from the Old English hyllhǣmetūn meaning 'settlement of the hill people'.
