= William Chetwynd, 3rd Viscount Chetwynd =

17th/18th-century English politician and Irish peer

William Richard Chetwynd, 3rd Viscount Chetwynd (1684 – 3 April 1770) was a British politician who sat in the House of Commons from 1715 to 1770.

== Early life ==
Chetwynd was the youngest son of John Chetwynd (1643–1702) and thus younger brother of Walter Chetwynd, 1st Viscount Chetwynd and John Chetwynd, 2nd Viscount Chetwynd. He was educated at Westminster School (c.1698–1702) and Christ Church, Oxford. In 1706, he became secretary to his elder brother John on his appointment as British envoy to Savoy at Turin, and in 1708 became British Resident at Genoa. During the financial crisis precipitated by the War of the Spanish Succession, the Chetwynd brothers drew on their commercial credit to provide General James Stanhope with the funds he needed to pay the British troops in Spain. William was recalled to England in 1712. He married Honora Baker, the daughter of William Baker, consul at Algiers in 1715.

== Political career ==
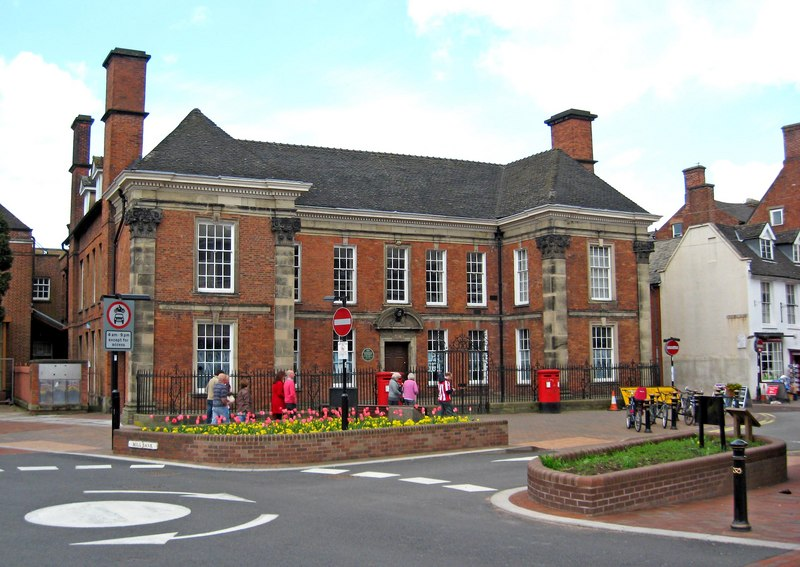
Chetwynd House

Chetwynd was returned unopposed with his brother Walter as Member of Parliament for Stafford at the 1715 general election and was appointed to office as a junior Lord of the Admiralty in 1717. Both brothers were defeated in a contest at Stafford in 1722 but he also stood for Parliament on the Navy interest at Plymouth and was returned there in 1722. Having voted with his friend Viscount Bolingbroke he lost his post at the Admiralty in 1727 and was not put forward for Plymouth again at the 1727 general election. He was elected MP for Stafford in 1734 in place of his brother Walter and was returned unopposed in 1741. In 1743 he was slightly injured in a duel at Parliament with Horatio Walpole. He was appointed master of the mint in 1744 and held the post until 1769. In 1745 he was appointed under-secretary of state and held the post until 1748. He was returned for Stafford again at the 1747 general election. He was returned for Stafford at the general elections of 1754, 1761 and after succeeding to his brother's Irish peerage under a special remainder in 1767 at the 1768 general election.

== Death and legacy ==
Chetwynd died on 3 April 1770 aged 86. He had two sons and four daughters, but disinherited his surviving son, William, who became the 4th Viscount.

Chetwynd built and lived in Chetwynd House in Stafford, which later was used as Stafford Post Office.

Coat of arms of William Chetwynd, 3rd Viscount Chetwynd
Crest A goat’s head erased Argent attired Or. Escutcheon Azure a chevron between three mullets Or. Supporters Two unicorns Argent each gorged with a chaplet of roses Gules barbed and seeded Proper thereto affixed reflexed over the back a line of roses as around the neck. Motto Probitas Verus Honos

Parliament of Great Britain
Preceded by Henry Vernon; The 1st Viscount Chetwynd	Member of Parliament for Stafford; 1715–1722; With: The 1st Viscount Chetwynd	Succeeded by Thomas Foley; John Dolphin
Preceded by Sir John Rogers; Hon. Pattee Byng	Member of Parliament for Plymouth; 1722–1727; With: Hon. Pattee Byng	Succeeded by Arthur Stert; George Treby
Preceded by Joseph Nightingale; The 1st Viscount Chetwynd	Member of Parliament for Stafford; 1734–1770; With: Thomas Foley 1734–1738; The 2nd Viscount Chetwynd 1738–1747; John Robins 1747–1754; William Richard Chetwynd 1754–1767; John Crewe 1765–1768; Richard Whitworth 1768–1770	Succeeded by William Neville Hart; Richard Whitworth
Diplomatic posts
Preceded by ?	British Resident at Genoa; 1708–1712	Succeeded by ?
Government offices
Preceded by Richard Arundell	Master of the Mint; 1745–1769	Succeeded by Charles Sloane Cadogan
Peerage of Ireland
Preceded by John Chetwynd	Viscount Chetwynd; 1767–1770	Succeeded by William Chetwynd
