= Walter Chetwynd, 1st Viscount Chetwynd =

British Whig politician

Coat of arms of Walter Chetwynd, 1st Viscount Chetwynd
Crest A goat’s head erased Argent attired Or. Escutcheon Azure a chevron between three mullets Or. Supporters Two unicorns Argent each gorged with a chaplet of roses Gules barbed and seeded Proper thereto affixed reflexed over the back a line of roses as around the neck. Motto Probitas Verus Honos

Walter Chetwynd, 1st Viscount Chetwynd (3 June 1678 – 21 February 1736), of Rudge and Ingestre, Staffordshire was a British Whig politician who sat in the House of Commons between 1702 and 1734.

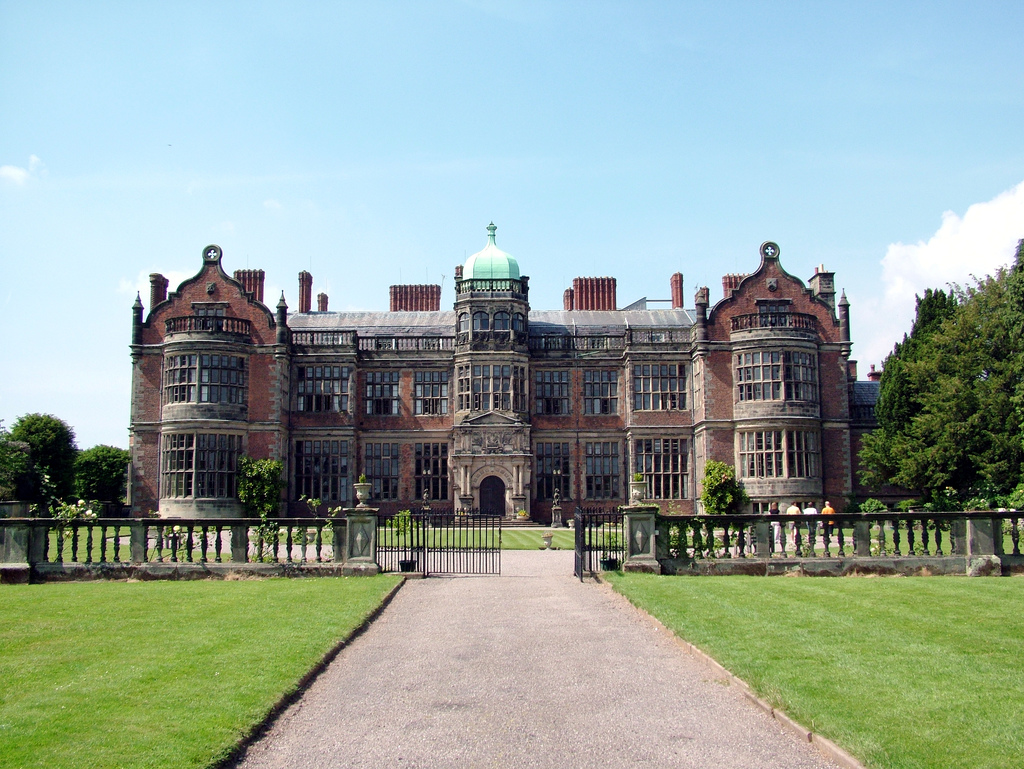
Ingestre Hall, Staffordshire

Chetwynd was the eldest son of John Chetwynd of Ingestre and his wife Lucy Roane, daughter of Robert Roane of Tullesworth, Chaldon, Surrey, and was baptized on 3 June 1678. In 1693 he succeeded to the Ingestre estates on the death of his cousin Walter Chetwynd (1633–1693). He was educated at Westminster School from 1692 to 1696 and matriculated at Christ Church, Oxford on 28 May 1696, aged 18. He married Mary Berkeley, daughter of John Berkeley, 4th Viscount Fitzhardinge on 27 May 1703.

Chetwynd was returned unopposed as Member of Parliament for Stafford at a by-election on 26 December 1702 on the death of his father. In 1705 he was appointed joint Master of Buckhounds to Prince George of Denmark. He was returned as MP for Stafford again in 1705 and 1708. In 1709 he was appointed sole Master of the Buckhounds to Queen Anne. He was re-elected MP for Stafford in 1710 but was unseated on petition on 25 January 1711. He regained the seat at a by-election on 24 January 1712 and held it in the 1713 general election. In 1714 he was appointed ranger of St. James's Park.

Chetwynd was returned again as MP for Safford in 1715. In 1717 he was elevated to an Irish Peerage as Viscount Chetwynd, with special remainder to his father's descendants. In the same year he was appointed high steward of Stafford. He lost his seat at the 1722 general election but was returned again at a by-election on 4 February 1725. He was returned again in 1727 but did not stand in 1734.

Chetwynd died on 21 February 1736. He and his wife had no children, so that his title and estates devolved upon his brother, John.

Parliament of England
Preceded by Thomas Foley; John Chetwynd	Member of Parliament for Stafford; 1702–1707; With: Thomas Foley	Succeeded by Parliament of Great Britain
Parliament of Great Britain
Preceded by Parliament of England	Member of Parliament for Stafford; 1707–1711; With: Thomas Foley	Succeeded by Thomas Foley; Henry Vernon
Preceded by Thomas Foley; Henry Vernon	Member of Parliament for Stafford; 1712–1722; With: Henry Vernon 1712–1715; William Chetwynd 1715–1722	Succeeded by Thomas Foley; John Dolphin
Preceded by Thomas Foley; Francis Elde	Member of Parliament for Stafford; 1725–1734; With: Thomas Foley 1725–1727; Joseph Nightingale 1727–1734	Succeeded by William Chetwynd; Thomas Foley
Political offices
Vacant Title last held by Reinhard Vincent Graf von Hompesch	Master of the Buckhounds; 1709–1711	Succeeded by Sir William Wyndham
Peerage of Ireland
New creation	Viscount Chetwynd; 1717–1736	Succeeded by John Chetwynd
