= Richard Whitworth =

British politician (c. 1734–1811)

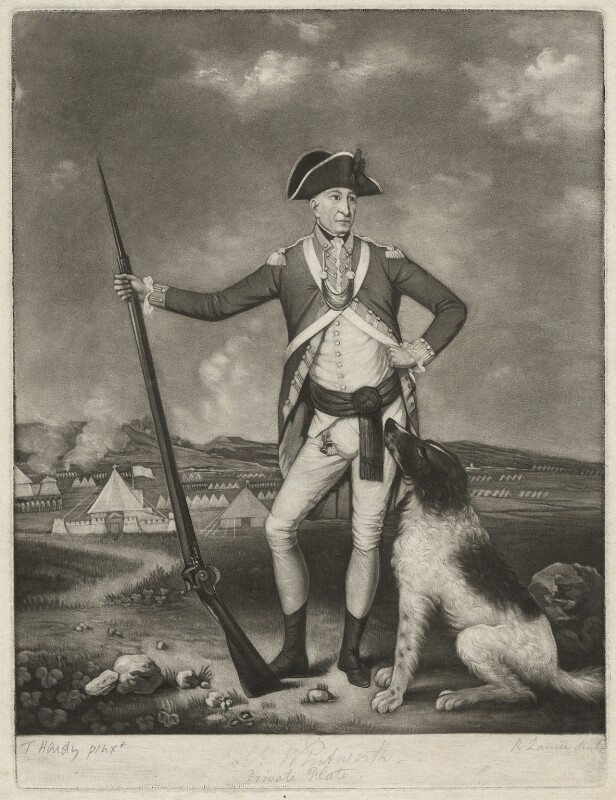
Richard Whitworth

Richard Whitworth (c. 1734–1811) was a British politician who sat in the House of Commons from 1768 to 1780.

Whitworth was the son of Richard Whitworth of Adbaston, Staffordshire. He was educated at Eton College and was admitted at Trinity College, Cambridge on 18 May 1752, aged 18. He was High Sheriff of Staffordshire in 1758–9. In 1766 he published a book advocating inland navigation.

Whitworth contested Stafford in 1768 on his own interest. He was against powerful opponents Lord Chetwynd and Hugo Meynell but managed to top the poll. In his first session in Parliament he made over 100 interventions in debate. He was re-elected unopposed at the 1774 general election. However he was defeated in the 1780 general election and did not stand again.

Whitmore died in September 1811, aged 77.

== Notes ==
Parliament of Great Britain
| Preceded by Hon. William Chetwynd; John Crewe | Member of Parliament for Stafford; 1768–1780; With: Hon. William Chetwynd 1768-1770; William Neville Hart 1770-1774; Hugo Meynell 1774-1780 | Succeeded by Edward Monckton; Richard Brinsley Sheridan |
