= Jonathan Cope (MP for Stafford) =

British landowner and politician

Jonathan Cope (1664–1694) was an English landowner and politician who sat in the House of Commons from 1690 to 1694

Cope was born on 9 July 1664, the third son of Jonathan Cope of Ranton Abbey and his wife Anne Farmer, daughter of Sir Halton Farmer of Easton Neston, Northamptonshire. He was the grandson of Sir William Cope, 2nd Baronet, of Hanwell, Oxfordshire. His father died in 1670 and in 1675 he succeeded to the family estates on the death of his brother. He matriculated at Christ Church, Oxford in 1681. He married Susannah Fowle, daughter. of Sir Thomas Fowle by a settlement of 19 October 1688.

Cope was High Sheriff of Staffordshire for the year 1685 to 1686. At the 1690 general election he was elected Member of Parliament for Stafford and held the seat until his death.

Cope died on 14 September 1694, and was buried in Ellenhall church on 22 September. His eldest son John was created a baronet and inherited the Hanwell estates in 1721.

Parliament of Great Britain
Preceded by Philip Foley; John Chetwynd	Member of Parliament for Stafford; 1690–1694; With: John Chetwynd	Succeeded by Thomas Foley; John Chetwynd
