= Thomas Foley =

Thomas Foley or Tom Foley may refer to:

== Political figures ==
- Thomas Foley (Australian politician) (1853–1920), member of the Queensland Legislative Assembly
- Thomas C. Foley (born 1952), American diplomat
- Thomas F. "Big Tom" Foley (1852–1925), American Tammany Hall politician and saloon keeper in New York City
- Tom Foley (Australian politician) (1886–1973), member of the Queensland Legislative Assembly
- Tom Foley (1929–2013), American congressman and Speaker of the House
- Tom Foley (Pennsylvania politician) (born 1953), politician from Pennsylvania who became President of Mount Aloysius College
- Tom Foley (New Jersey politician), politician from New Jersey who served in the State Assembly

== Others ==
- Thomas Foley (Royal Navy officer) (1757–1833), British admiral
- Thomas Patrick Roger Foley (1822–1879), American religious leader
- Thomas Foley, journalist and friend of Ian Holbourn, who married RMS Lusitania survivor Avis Dolphin
- Tom Foley (infielder) (born 1959), American baseball player and coach
- Tom Foley (outfielder) (1847–1896), American baseball player
- Tom Foley (racehorse trainer) (1946–2021), Irish racehorse trainer

== The Barons Foley and family ==
- Thomas Foley (died 1677) (1616–1677), British ironmaster, builder of Witley Court estate, member of parliament for Bewdley
- Thomas Foley (died 1701) (c. 1641–1701), son of previous, member of parliament for Worcestershire, and then Droitwich
- Thomas Foley, 1st Baron Foley (1673–1733), son of previous, member of parliament for Stafford, and then Droitwich
- Thomas Foley, 2nd Baron Foley (1703–1766), son of previous, never married, rebuilt parish church of Great Witley
- Thomas Foley (auditor of the imprests) (c. 1670–1737), of Stoke Edith, member of parliament for Weobly, then Hereford, then Stafford
- Thomas Foley (died 1749) (c. 1695–1749), son of previous, member of parliament for Hereford, then Herefordshire
- Thomas Foley, 1st Baron Foley (1716–1777), son of previous, member of parliament for Droitwich, then Herefordshire, inherited the Witley Court estate from his cousin, the 2nd baron
- Thomas Foley, 2nd Baron Foley (1742–1793), son of previous, member of parliament for Herefordshire, then Droitwich
- Thomas Foley, 3rd Baron Foley (1780–1833), son of previous, member of parliament and Captain of the Honourable Corps of Gentlemen-at-Arms
- Thomas Foley, 4th Baron Foley (1808–1869), son of previous, member of parliament for Worcestershire and Captain of the Honourable Corps of Gentlemen-at-Arms
- Thomas Foley (1778–1822), grandson of the first baron, member of parliament for Herefordshire and Droitwich

== See also ==
- Barons Foley
