= Philip Foley =

English politician (1648–1716)

Philip Foley (12 May 1648 – December 1716) was the youngest of the three surviving sons of the British ironmaster Thomas Foley. His father transferred all his ironworks in the Midlands to him in 1668 and 1669 for £60,000. He also settled an estate at Prestwood near Stourbridge on him on his marriage, to which Philip added the manor of Kinver.

== Ironworks ==
Philip ran the ironworks but found that they were not as profitable as they had been, and began from 1674 to sell them off. One group was bought by Sir Clement Clerke. He disposed of the last of them to two of his managers John Wheeler and Richard Avenant, and they also took over what had been Sir Clement Clerke's ironworks when some of those reverted to Philip Foley.

Wheeler and Avenant were more successful in running a rather reduced business and leased blast furnaces in the Forest of Dean from Philip's brother Paul. In 1692, the two joined the managers in the business. Philip remained a partner for the rest of his life, but his family sold out of it shortly after his death. This business produced high quality pig iron which was sent up the River Severn for sale through a warehouse at Bewdley, as well as supplying the firm's own forges such as Wilden Forge on the River Stour. In 1705, John Wheeler retired from managing the business in favour of William Rea, and the firm gave up its remaining ironworks in the Stour valley.

Another iron making business became available with the death of Philip's uncle Henry Glover in 1689. This was handed over to John Wheeler, but in 1695, he and Philip decided that Philip had actually been a partner in it since 1689. This probably could not be openly declared earlier as Philip was one of Glover's executors. This had iron works consisting of Mearheath Furnace (a little distance from the present Meir Heath), and Consall and Oakamoor Forges. Further works were added, including a group in the east Midlands consisting of Staveley Furnace and Forge and Carburton Forge, though that group were only used from 1695 to 1698 when they were handed over to Yorkshire ironmasters. They also made a trade investment in ironworks in Cheshire, in connection with securing a supply of pig iron from there. The Staffordshire and Cheshire businesses were amalgamated in 1708, but Philip probably sold out shortly after 1710.

== Politics ==
Philip was also involved in politics as a Member of Parliament and was first elected for Bewdley in 1679. He was subsequently elected for Stafford in 1689 and 1695 and Droitwich in 1690 and 1701.

There was a time when five of the family were in the House of Commons together, the others being his brothers Thomas and Paul Foley, and his nephews (their sons) both called Thomas, one of whom later became Lord Foley. They belonged to the Country Whigs, like their brother in law Robert Harley.

== Religion ==
Like most of his family, he was a Presbyterian, though evidently conforming to the Church of England at least occasionally. He employed a series of domestic chaplains, who established Presbyterian congregations in several nearby towns.

== Family ==
Philip married Penelope, daughter of William Paget, 5th Baron Paget. Their eldest son was Paul Foley of Prestwood (died 27 November 1739). He married Elizabeth Turton, and died leaving two sons (William, born 17 May 1710, and Philip, born 4 June 1711) and three older daughters, including Elizabeth (born 3 November 1707) who married John Hodgetts of Shut End in Kingswinford. Their only child Eliza Maria Foley Hodgetts married her distant cousin Hon Edward Foley. The Prestwood estate followed this descent, being settled on her marriage to descend to her second son John Hodgetts Hodgetts-Foley. Paul's daughter, Penelope, married Charles Howard, and through their daughter Mary Howard, who married Dr Erasmus Darwin, they were the paternal great grandparents of Charles Darwin.

Parliament of England
Preceded by Henry Herbert	Member of Parliament for Bewdley; 1679–1685	Succeeded by Sir Charles Lyttelton, Bt
Preceded by Walter Chetwynd; Rowland Okeover	Member of Parliament for Stafford; 1689–1690; With: John Chetwynd	Succeeded by John Chetwynd; Jonathan Cope
Preceded by Samuel Sandys; The Lord Coote	Member of Parliament for Droitwich; 1690–1695; With: The Lord Coote	Succeeded by Edward Harley; Charles Cocks
Preceded by John Chetwynd; Thomas Foley	Member of Parliament for Stafford; 1695–1701; With: Thomas Foley	Succeeded by Thomas Foley; John Chetwynd
Preceded by Charles Cocks; Thomas Foley	Member of Parliament for Droitwich; 1701; With: Charles Cocks	Succeeded by Charles Cocks; Edward Foley
