= Woodbury Hill =

Hillfort in Worcestershire, England

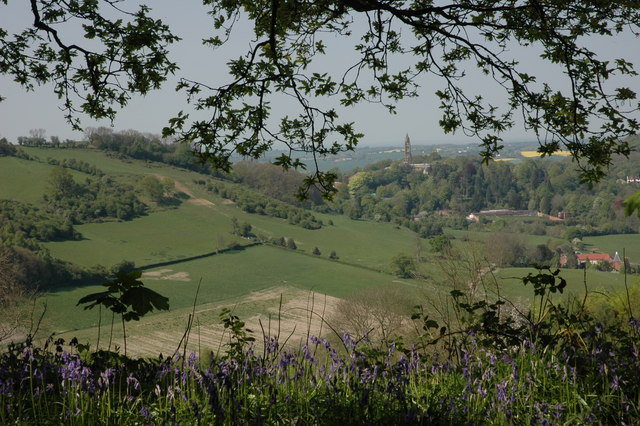
- View north from Woodbury Hill. In the middle distance is Abberley Clock Tower.

- Location within Worcestershire
- 52.2780°N 2.3693°W
- Type: Hillfort
- Periods: Iron Age
- Location: near Great Witley, Worcestershire
- OS grid reference: SO 749 646

Site notes
- Area: 11 hectares (27 acres)

Scheduled monument
- Designated: 10 August 1923
- Reference no.: 1005330

Woodbury Hill is a hill near the village of Great Witley, about 5 miles (8 km) south-west of Stourport-on-Severn in Worcestershire, England. It is the site of an Iron Age hillfort.

== Description ==
The hill overlooks the River Teme to the south-west. The fort (a scheduled monument) has a single rampart with an external ditch. It has dimensions of about 600 metres (2,000 ft) west to east and 350 metres (1,150 ft) north to south, enclosing an area of about 11 hectares (27 acres). There is an entrance with inturned ramparts at the south-west, and other entrances. A track leads north to south through the site.

== History ==
The fort is called "Owen Glendower's Camp". In 1405 it was the site of a standoff between the Welsh/French army of Owain Glyndŵr and the army of King Henry IV of England. The armies took up battle positions, the English on Abberley Hill and the Welsh and French on Woodbury Hill. They never engaged in battle; with their supply routes blocked, the Welsh began to starve. Henry stood down his army, and the Welsh army headed home.

During the English Civil War, local peasants met here to form a clubmen society to protect themselves from the ravages of both the Royalist and Roundhead troops.

== See also ==
- Hillforts in Britain
