= Sankyns Green =

Hamlet in Worcestershire, England

Coordinates: 52.281°N 2.303°W

- Location within Worcestershire
- Civil parish: Shrawley
- District: Malvern Hills
- Shire county: Worcestershire
- Region: West Midlands
- Country: England
- Sovereign state: United Kingdom
- Post town: Worcester
- Postcode district: WR6
- Police: West Mercia
- Fire: Hereford and Worcester
- Ambulance: West Midlands
- UK Parliament: West Worcestershire

Sankyns Green is a hamlet within the civil parish of Shrawley in Worcestershire, England.
