= William Richard Chetwynd =

English aristocrat and politician

William Richard Chetwynd (c. 1731 – February 1765) was an English aristocrat and politician.

The second son of John Chetwynd, 2nd Viscount Chetwynd, he was educated at Eton College and Corpus Christi College, University of Oxford.

He was elected as Member of Parliament for Stafford in 1754 and held the seat until his death in 1765. His father had served as MP for the same seat 1738–1747; the Chetwynd family has strong associations with Stafford.

William Chetwynd married Elizabeth, daughter of William Wollaston, MP for Ipswich. They had a daughter Isabella, who married John Parsons.

William Chetwynd pre-deceased his father and left no male heir. The family estates at Ingestre passed on his father's death to his sister Catherine and then to her son William Talbot, 1st Earl Talbot, while his father's title as Viscount passed to William's uncle and namesake William Richard Chetwynd, 3rd Viscount Chetwynd.

Parliament of Great Britain
Preceded by John Robins	Member of Parliament for Stafford; William Richard Chetwynd; 1754–1765	Succeeded by John Crewe
