= Church of St Michael and All Angels, Stourport =

Church of St Michael and All Angels
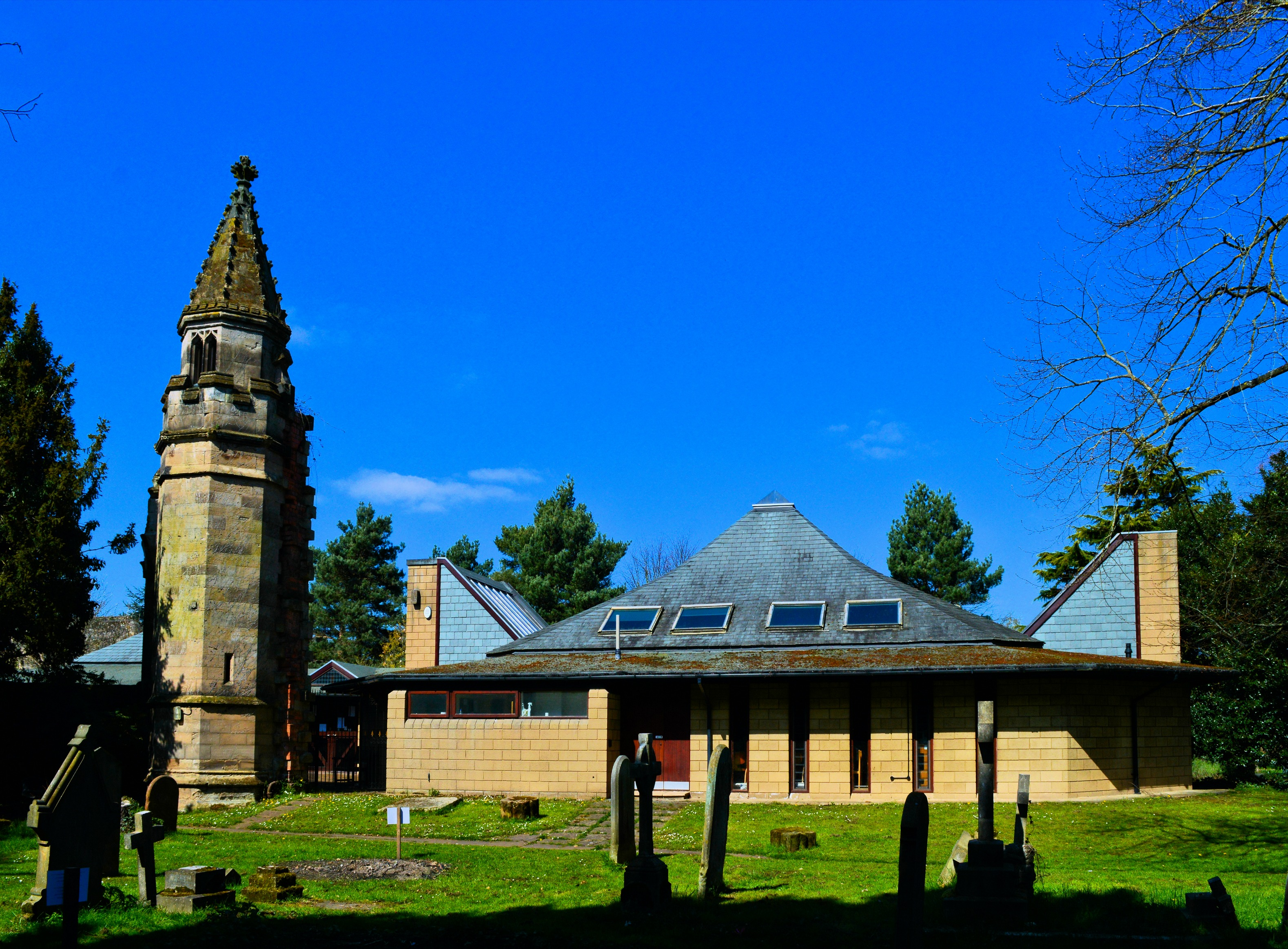
- The 1980 church, seen from the south
- Church of St Michael and All Angels
- 52°20′36.9″N 2°16′25″W
- OS grid reference: SO 81457 71758
- Location: Stourport-on-Severn, Worcestershire
- Country: England
- Denomination: Church of England

Architecture
- Heritage designation: Grade II
- Designated: 9 November 1971

Administration
- Diocese: Diocese of Worcester
- Deanery: Kidderminster and Stourport

The Church of St Michael and All Angels is an Anglican church in Stourport-on-Severn, Worcestershire, England. It is in the Benefice of St Michael's, Stourport and All Saints, Wilden, in the Deanery of Kidderminster and Stourport, and in the Diocese of Worcester.

The current church, built in 1980, stands within the Grade II listed remains of the church built in the late 19th century. There were two earlier churches.

== History and description ==
A chapel of ease in the parish of Kidderminster, situated on or near the site of the present church, was here by 1200. The area, at that time known as the hamlet of Lower Mitton, later became part of Stourport, as the town grew following the building of the Staffordshire and Worcestershire Canal in the late 18th century.

The church, in poor condition and inadequate for the population of the chapelry, was replaced. The new church, completed in 1792, was a brick building, having a nave with galleries, transepts and west tower. With the continuing increase in local population, the building was enlarged in the 1830s, the length being increased from 52 feet to 79 feet 6 inches. By the 1870s the building was regarded as inadequate, in seating accommodation and architectural quality.

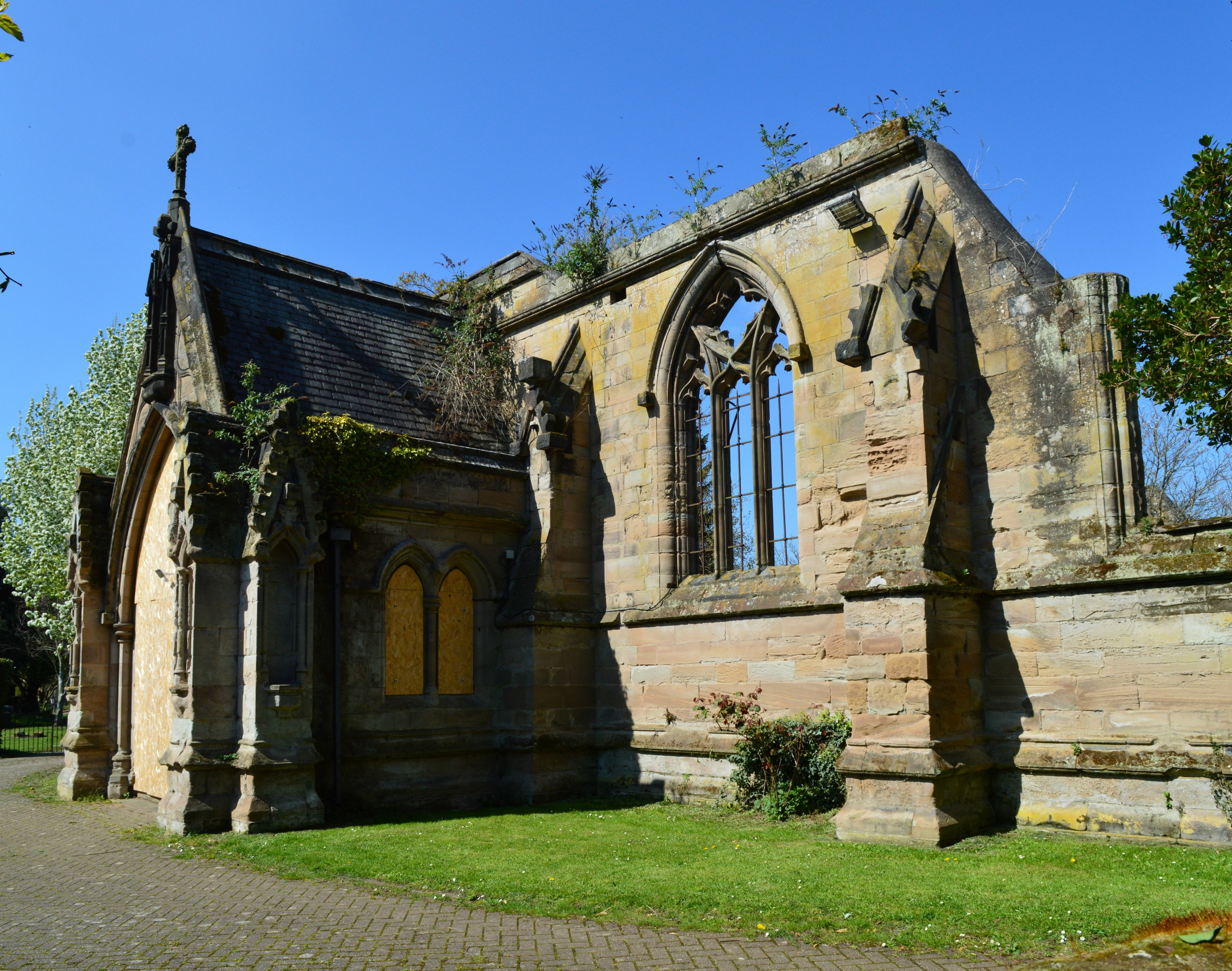
The south wall and porch of the old building

A new building was proposed in 1875. George Gilbert Scott was commissioned to design it, and he submitted plans. After his death in 1878, his son John Oldrid Scott continued the work. Building began, north of the old church, in 1882. The church was never completed, the unfinshed east end and west end being bricked up by the time of the consecration in 1910. The earlier church was demolished after the First World War.

Gilbert Scott's church was badly damaged in a storm in 1976. It was partially demolished; the surviving remains include the south porch with south door, and large parts of the south and north walls, including the north door.

A new building, designed by Adrian Thompson, was erected in 1980 within these remains. It has a central altar. The organ, built for the new church, was by William Drake, and the font, dating from the 18th century, was in the previous two churches.
