= George Pearce Baldwin =

English ironworker (1787–1840)

- Born: 17 May 1789
- Died: 1 October 1840 (aged 51)
- Spouse(s): Anne Hill; Sarah Chalkley Stanley

George Pearce Baldwin (17 May 1789 – 1 October 1840) came from Broseley in Shropshire and moved to Worcestershire at the start of the 19th Century, becoming an iron founder at Stourport-on-Severn. He was the son of Thomas Baldwin and Mary Gough.

He had 12 children, the youngest of whom, Alfred, father of the future prime minister Stanley Baldwin, was born in 1841, the year after George died.

== Family life ==
He was married to Anne Hill on 16 April 1812; together they had two children:

- Pearce Baldwin (born 20 July 1813; died 6 April 1861)
- William Hill Baldwin (born 8 March 1817, died 11 May 1863).

He then married Sarah Chalkley Stanley, daughter of Reverend Jacob Stanley, on 4 October 1822. His children by his second wife were:

- George Baldwin (8 April 1824 – 17 October 1824), died in infancy
- George Baldwin (16 March 1826 – 5 March 1881)
- Stanley Baldwin (4 February 1828 – 21 September 1907)
- Sarah Anne Baldwin (19 April 1830 – 15 December 1919)
- Edward Baldwin (26 May 1832 – 26 April 1848)
- Mary Jane Baldwin (16 January 1834 – 18 January 1908)
- Lucilla Baldwin (16 March 1836 – November 1916)
- Eliza Baldwin (2 September 1837 – July 1914)
- Alfred Baldwin (4 June 1841 – 13 February 1908), father of Prime Minister Stanley Baldwin

After George Pearce Baldwin's death, his sons Pearce and William took over the Wilden Ironworks in 1849 with their uncle, Enoch Baldwin. This ironworks incorporated Wilden Forge (which had been built in 1647 by Thomas Foley (1616-1677). It had usually been operated by (or for) members of the Foley family until 1776, and after that by various tenants (see Wilden Ironworks for details). The Wilden Works were taken over in 1870 by the youngest half-brother of Pearce and William, Alfred. It became the basis for the subsequent fortune of the Baldwin family.

== See also ==
- Wilden Ironworks
