= John Chetwynd =

English Member of Parliament

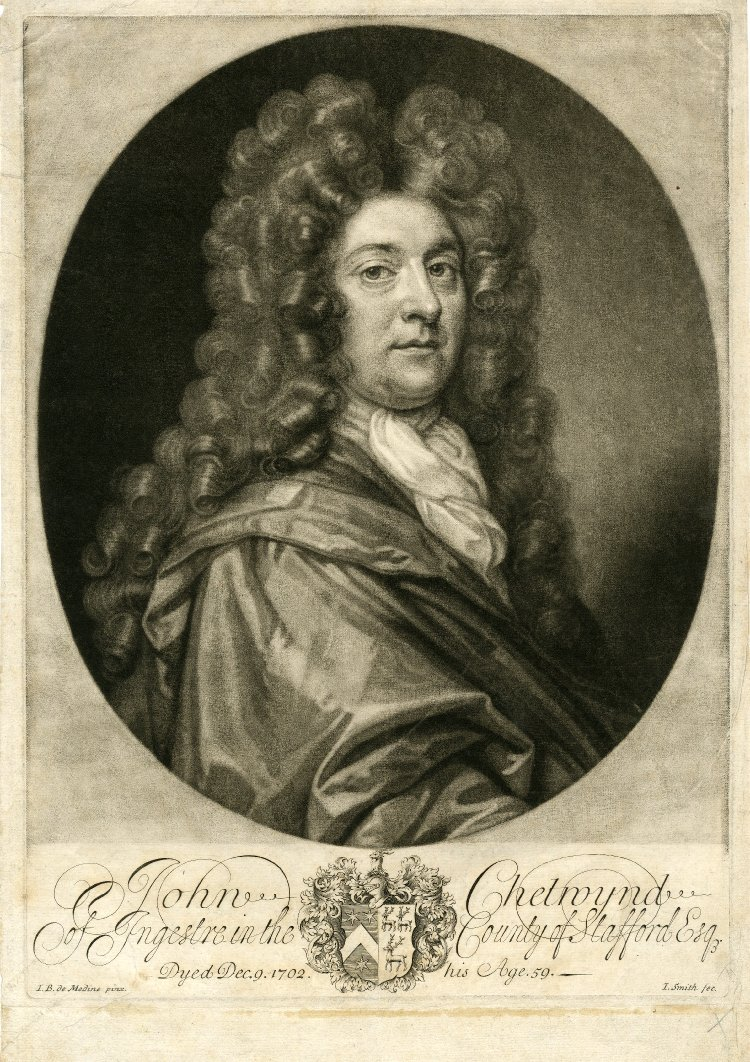
John Chetwynd, mezzotint by John Smith.

John Chetwynd (1643 – 9 December 1702), of Rudge, near Sandon, Staffordshire was an English Member of Parliament.

He was the eldest son of John Chetwynd of Rudge.

He was Member of Parliament for Stafford from 1689 to 1695, and again in 1701 and 1702. In the intervening period he sat for Tamworth in 1698–1700. He was pricked High Sheriff of Staffordshire for 1695–96.

He died in 1702. He had married, by 1678, Lucy, the daughter of Robert Roane of Tullesworth, Chaldon, Surrey and had 3 sons and a daughter.

His son Walter inherited the Ingestre estate from his distant cousin Walter Chetwynd the antiquary in 1693, greatly raising the prominence of his branch of the family. Walter was created Viscount Chetwynd in 1717, a title to which John's other two sons (John and William) succeeded in turn.

His daughter Lucy married Edward Younge, Bath King of Arms.

Parliament of England
Preceded by Walter Chetwynd; Rowland Okeover	Member of Parliament for Stafford; 1689–1695; With: Philip Foley 1689–90; Jonathan Cope 1690–94; Thomas Foley 1694–95	Succeeded by Philip Foley; Thomas Foley
Preceded by Sir Henry Gough; Thomas Guy	Member of Parliament for Tamworth; 1698–1699; With: with Thomas Guy	Succeeded by Sir Henry Gough; Thomas Guy
Preceded by Philip Foley; Thomas Foley	Member of Parliament for Stafford; 1701; With: Thomas Foley	Succeeded by John Pershall; Thomas Foley
Preceded by John Pershall; Thomas Foley	Member of Parliament for Stafford; 1701–1702; With: Thomas Foley	Succeeded by Walter Chetwynd; Thomas Foley
