= Thomas Foley, 2nd Baron Foley (1703–1766) =

English Ironmaster

Portrait of an Unknown Gentleman, thought to be Thomas Foley, 1703–1766, 2nd Lord Foley, painting after Allan Ramsay, c. 1762.

Thomas Foley, 2nd Baron Foley FRS (1703 – 8 January 1766), was the eldest son of Thomas Foley, 1st Baron Foley, and inherited the vast Great Witley estate on his father's death in 1733, including ironworks at Wilden and Shelsley Walsh.

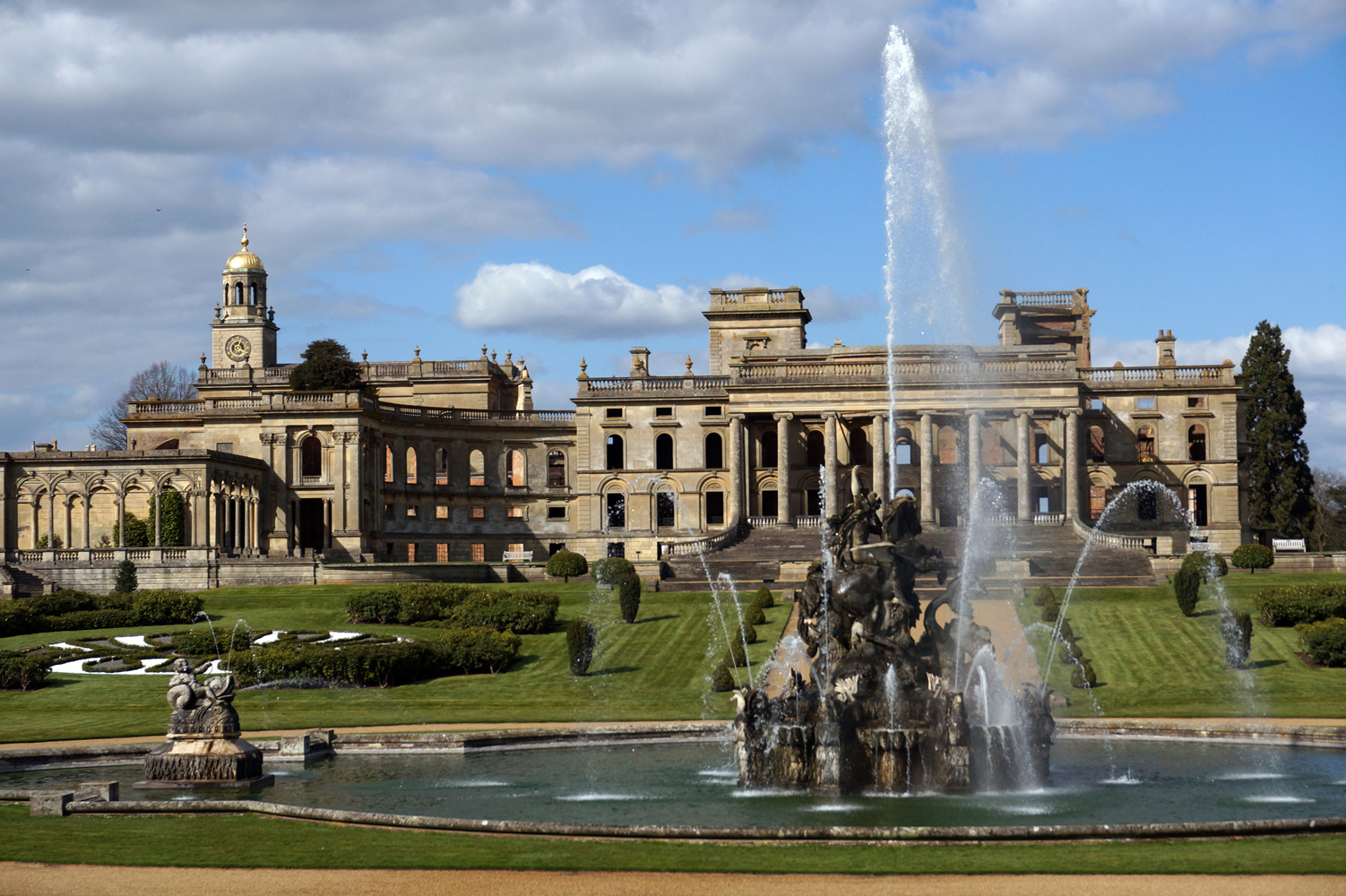
Witley Court

His father had dreamed of rebuilding the parish church, close to the family mansion of Witley Court, but died before doing so. This was undertaken by his widow Mary and son, and completed in 1735. The building was designed by James Gibbs. It was transformed in 1747, when Lord Foley bought decorative features of the chapel at Cannons, Lord Chandos' palace at Edgware. He then employed mould-makers to reproduce its plasterwork, making the church one of the finest baroque churches in Britain.

Unlike his father and three younger brothers, Lord Foley did not sit in the House of Commons. He never married. On his death, his estates devolved on his distant cousin Thomas Foley of Stoke Edith, for whom the title Lord Foley was revived in 1776. The new Lord Foley referred in this will to his predecessor as his "great benefactor".

In 1740 he was elected a Fellow of the Royal Society. In about 1740, he bought the Manor of Great Malvern in Malvern from Lord Mountfort. His successors continued to be its Lord of the manor through the 19th century.

Peerage of Great Britain
Preceded by Thomas Foley	Baron Foley; 1st creation 1733–1766	Extinct
