= Wilden, Worcestershire =

Village in Worcestershire, England

Coordinates: 52.35029°N 2.25834°W

Wilden
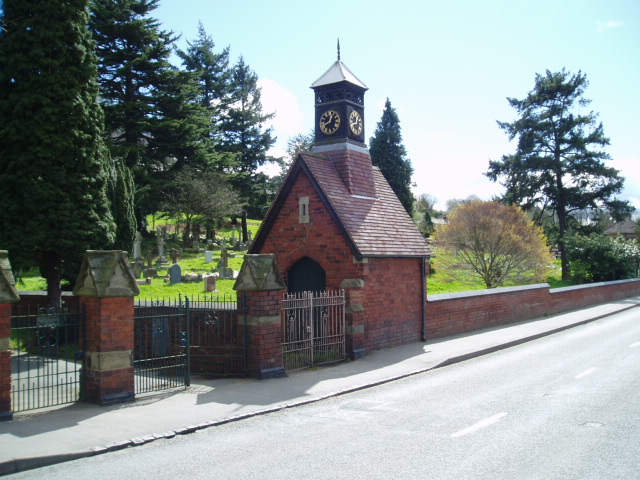
- Alfred Baldwin Clocktower Memorial, Wilden

- Location within Worcestershire
- OS grid reference: SO825725
- Shire county: Worcestershire
- Region: West Midlands
- Country: England
- Sovereign state: United Kingdom
- Post town: STOURPORT-ON-SEVERN
- Postcode district: DY13
- Police: West Mercia
- Fire: Hereford and Worcester
- Ambulance: West Midlands

Wilden is a small village about 1 mile north east of Stourport-on-Severn, Worcestershire.

It is in the Stour valley and both the River Stour and the Staffordshire and Worcestershire Canal pass through the parish before joining the River Severn at Stourport. Nearby is Wilden Marsh, a nature reserve of the Worcestershire Wildlife Trust.

== History ==
Wilden was originally part of the parish of Hartlebury, but became a separate parish in the late 19th century, before becoming part of Stourport.

In the 17th century there were slitting mills on the River Stour near to the site of present church. Eventually, these mills came into the ownership of the Wilden Iron and Tin Plate Company and the Baldwin family.

A lock at Pratt's Wharf (misnamed Platt's Wharf by the Ordnance Survey) on the Staffordshire and Worcestershire Canal, connected the canal with the river. This enabled canal barges to use the River Stour to deliver timber to a steam saw-mill in Wilden. Later it was used to transport coal and iron to the Wilden Works. The wharf was built by Isaac Pratt from Henwick, Worcester in 1835. He is described as a businessman and a merchant. There were two houses at Pratt's Wharf, one occupied by a lock keeper and the other by a clerk. The link was closed c1950.

The church is All Saints. It was designed by William Hopkins with funds provided by Alfred Baldwin very close to his own home, Wilden House and one of his large iron works. It served the Baldwin family and their employees and was consecrated in 1880. The church has been designated as Grade II listed by Historic England.
