= John Chetwynd, 2nd Viscount Chetwynd =

British diplomat and politician

Coat of arms of John Chetwynd, 2nd Viscount Chetwynd
Crest A goat’s head erased Argent attired Or. Escutcheon Azure a chevron between three mullets Or. Supporters Two unicorns Argent each gorged with a chaplet of roses Gules barbed and seeded Proper thereto affixed reflexed over the back a line of roses as around the neck. Motto Probitas Verus Honos

John Chetwynd, 2nd Viscount Chetwynd (c.1680 – 21 June 1767) was a British diplomat and politician who sat in the House of Commons between 1715 and 1747.

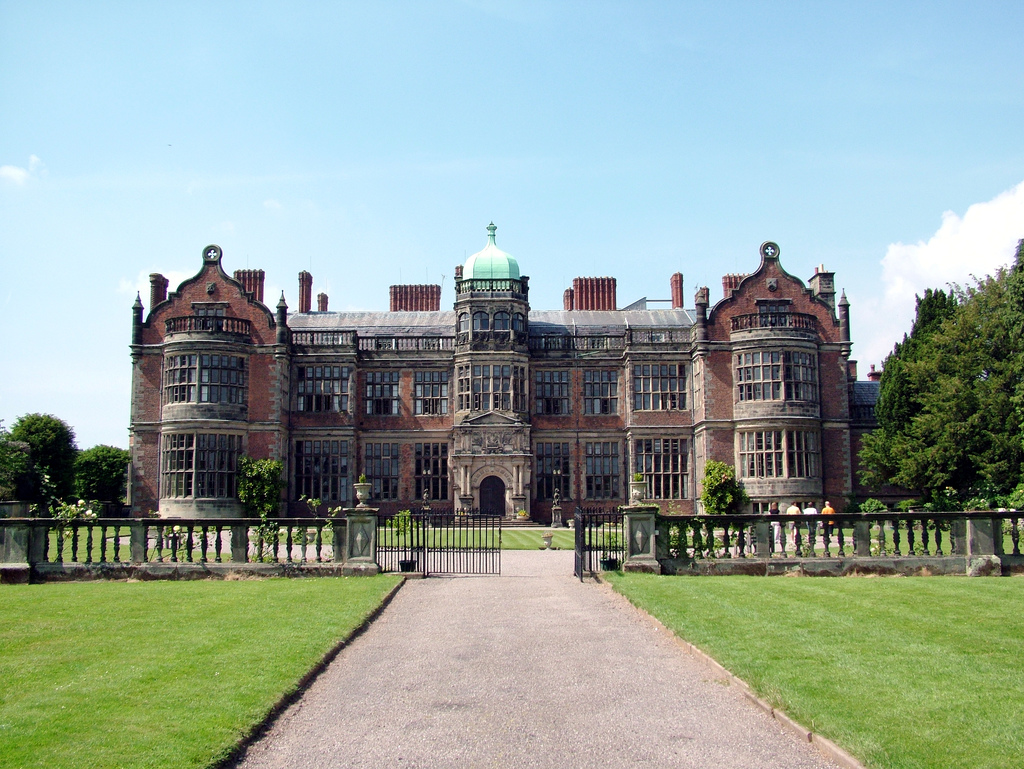
Ingestre Hall

Chetwynd was the second son of John Chetwynd of Ingestre and his wife Lucy Roane, daughter of Robert Roane of Tolhurst Farm, Surrey. In 1699 he was secretary to the Duke of Manchester at Paris until 1701. He was receiver general for the Duchy of Lancaster from 1702 to 1718. He was secretary at Turin from 1703 to 1706 when he became British envoy to Savoy until 1713.

Chetwynd was appointed a Lord of Trade in 1714 and was returned unopposed as Member of Parliament for St Mawes at the 1715 general election. In 1717 he was sent as British envoy Extraordinary at Madrid to deal with a commercial treaty until the outbreak of the War of the Quadruple Alliance. He was then returned unopposed as MP for Stockbridge at the 1722 general election and was returned again in 1727. However, in 1728 he lost his position as Lord of Trade and in 1734 decided not to stand for parliament.

On the death of his elder brother Walter Chetwynd, 1st Viscount Chetwynd, he succeeded to his Irish title as 2nd Viscount Chetwynd in 1736 by virtue of a special remainder and to his Ingestre estate. He was High Steward of Stafford from 1736 and was returned as MP for Stafford at a by-election on 31 January 1738. He held the seat until 1747.

Chetwynd died on 21 June 1767. He had married Esther Kent about 1716 and with his wife had two sons and two daughters:

- John Chetwynd, who died on 30 May 1741 aged 21 and unmarried
- William Richard Chetwynd, Member of Parliament for Stafford, who died in 1765 before his father
- Catherine Chetwynd, who married John Talbot, the 2nd son of Charles Talbot, 1st Baron Talbot. By this marriage, the Ingestre estate passed into the Talbot family.
- Frances Chetwynd (died unmarried 1805).

Having outlived both his sons, Chetwynd was succeeded as Viscount by his brother William but the Ingestre estate passed to his widowed daughter Catherine Talbot.

Parliament of England
Preceded by Edward Rolt; Francis Scobell	Member of Parliament for St Mawes; 1715–1722; With: William Lowndes	Succeeded by Sidney Godolphin; Samuel Travers
Preceded by Thomas Brodrick; Martin Bladen	Member of Parliament for Stockbridge; 1722–1734; With: Martin Bladen	Succeeded by Sir Humphrey Monoux; John Montagu
Preceded by Thomas Foley; William Chetwynd	Member of Parliament for Stafford; 1738–1747; With: William Chetwynd	Succeeded by John Robins; William Chetwynd
Diplomatic posts
Preceded by Paul Methuen	British Minister at Turin; 1706–1713	Succeeded by ?
Preceded by George Bubb	British Envoy Extraordinary to Spain; 1717–1718 (?)	Vacant War of the Quadruple Alliance Title next held by William Stanhope
Peerage of Ireland
Preceded by Walter Chetwynd	Viscount Chetwynd; 1736–1767	Succeeded by William Chetwynd
