= Thomas Foley, 1st Baron Foley (1673–1733) =

British politician

Thomas Foley, 1st Baron Foley FRS (8 November 1673 – 22 January 1733), of Witley Court, Great Witley, Worcestershire, was an English landowner, ironmaster and Tory politician who sat in the English and British House of Commons from 1694 until 1712, when he was raised to the peerage as Baron Foley as one of Harley's Dozen.

== Early life ==
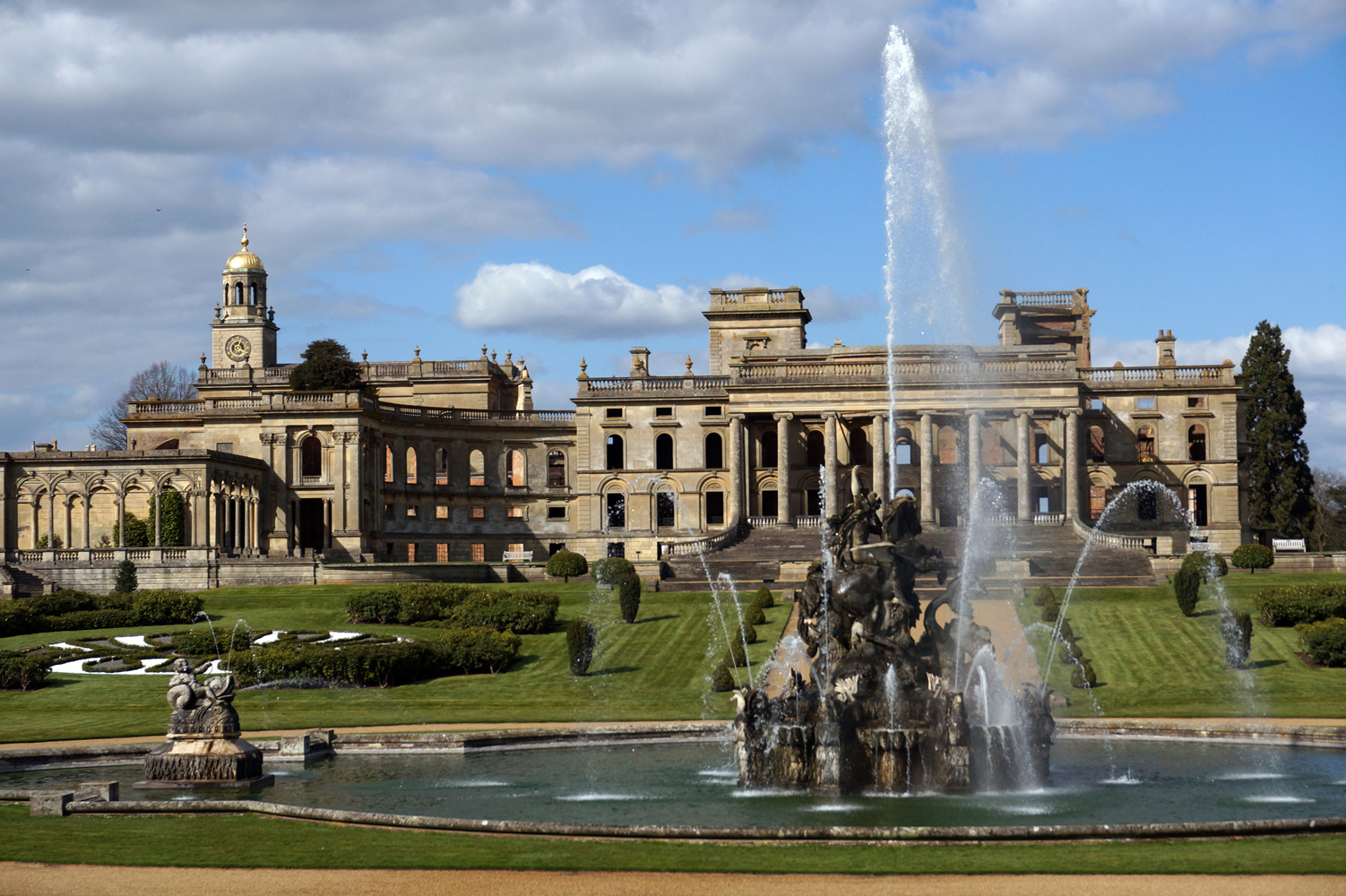
Witley Court

Foley was the eldest son of Thomas Foley and inherited the Great Witley estate on his father's death. His younger brothers were Edward Foley and Richard Foley.

He was educated at Sheriffhales academy under John Woodhouse in 1689 and then for some years at Utrecht. He was admitted at Lincoln's Inn on 30 May 1695.

== Career ==
When the lease of ironworks at Wilden and Shelsley Walsh expired in 1708, Foley took them in hand and they were operated as an estate enterprise by him and successive owners of the estate until 1776.

Foley was elected a Fellow of the Royal Society in 1696.

=== Political career ===
Foley was returned as Member of Parliament for Stafford at a by election on 21 November 1694 followed up by an unopposed return at the 1695 English general election. He was a Commissioner for taking subscriptions to the land bank in 1696. He held the seat at Stafford until 1712 when he was raised to the peerage, as one of 12 peers created on the recommendation of the Lord Treasurer, the Earl of Oxford, to give him a majority in the House of Lords.

== Personal life ==
Foley married Mary Strode with whom he fathered seven children, five of them predeceasing their parents. His only surviving son was:

- Thomas Foley, 2nd Baron Foley (1703–1766), who never married.

After his son Thomas' death in 1766, the title became extinct, while the estates devolved upon the latter's distant cousin Thomas Foley of Stoke Edith, Herefordshire, for whom the title was revived in 1776.

Parliament of England
Preceded by John Chetwynd; Jonathan Cope	Member of Parliament for Stafford; 1694–1712; With: John Chetwynd 1694–1695, 1701, 1702; Philip Foley 1695–1701; John Pershall 1701–1702; Walter Chetwynd 1702–1707	Succeeded by Parliament of Great Britain
Preceded by Edward Harley; Charles Cocks	Member of Parliament for Droitwich; 1698–1699; With: Charles Cocks	Succeeded by Charles Cocks; Thomas Foley
Parliament of Great Britain
Preceded by Parliament of England	Member of Parliament for Stafford; 1707–1712; With: Walter Chetwynd 1707–1711; Henry Vernon 1711–1712	Succeeded by Henry Vernon; Walter Chetwynd
Peerage of Great Britain
New creation	Baron Foley; 1st creation 1712–1733	Succeeded by Thomas Foley
