= Great Witley =

Village in Worcestershire, England

Coordinates: 52.283333°N 2.35°W

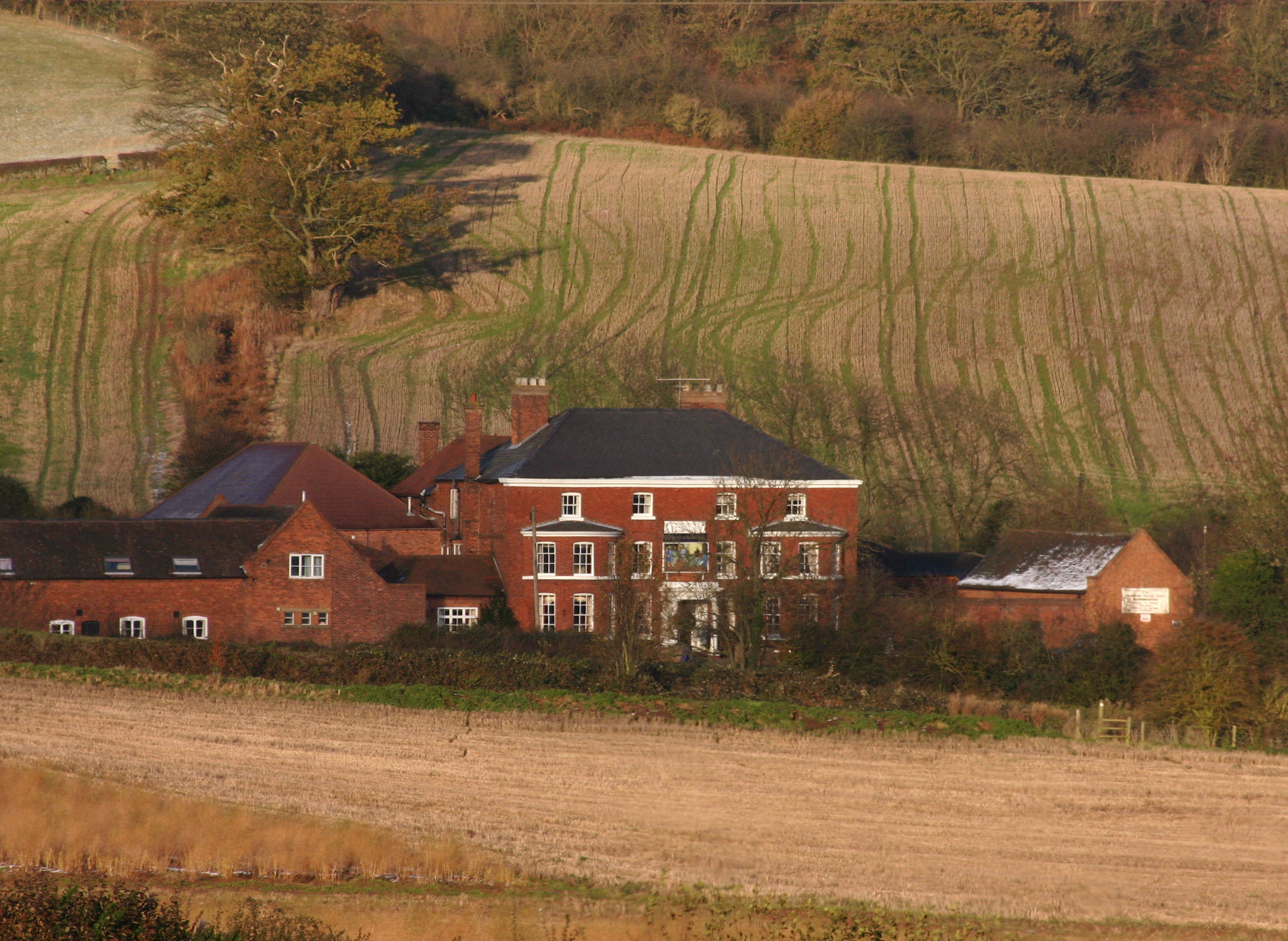
- The Hundred House, Great Witley

- Location within Worcestershire
- Population: 743 (2021)
- District: Malvern Hills District
- Shire county: Worcestershire
- Region: West Midlands
- Country: England
- Sovereign state: United Kingdom
- Post town: Worcester
- Postcode district: WR6
- Police: West Mercia
- Fire: Hereford and Worcester
- Ambulance: West Midlands
- UK Parliament: West Worcestershire

Great Witley is a village and civil parish in the Malvern Hills District in the northwest of the county of Worcestershire, England. It is situated around ten miles to the north west of the city of Worcester. The parish had a population of 743 in 2021.

The civil parish shares a group parish council with Hillhampton, known as the Great Witley and Hillhampton Parish Council.

== History ==
The name Witley derives from the Old English wihtlēah meaning 'wood/clearing in a bend'.

There has been a settlement in the area since before the Norman Conquest.

Great Witley was in the lower division of Doddingtree Hundred.

Following the Poor Law Amendment Act 1834 Great Witley Parish ceased to be responsible for maintaining the poor in its parish. This responsibility was transferred to Martley Poor Law Union.

The village is home to Witley Court, a Jacobean country house extended on a number of occasions throughout its history, but which became derelict after a spectacular fire in 1937. The mansion, formerly one of the finest in the Midlands, is now in the care of English Heritage, who describe it as their number one ruin. They have restored the extensive gardens leaving the skeletal ruin of the building overlooking them.

Nearby is Woodbury Hill commanding extensive views south to the Malvern Hills and over the River Teme valley to the west. On the summit is an Iron Age hillfort. Owain Glyndŵr's army of Welsh and French camped here for eight days in the summer of 1405 facing an army of King Henry IV at Abberley Hill. Skirmishes took place but neither large force initiated full-scale battle and the Welsh withdrew under nightfall back to Wales. The location was also used as a meeting place during the English Civil War by Clubmen from the local farms and cottages.

From 1843 to 1846 Queen Adelaide, the widow of King William IV resided at Witley Court. Whilst there she financed the first village school.

== Saint Michael and All Angels Church ==
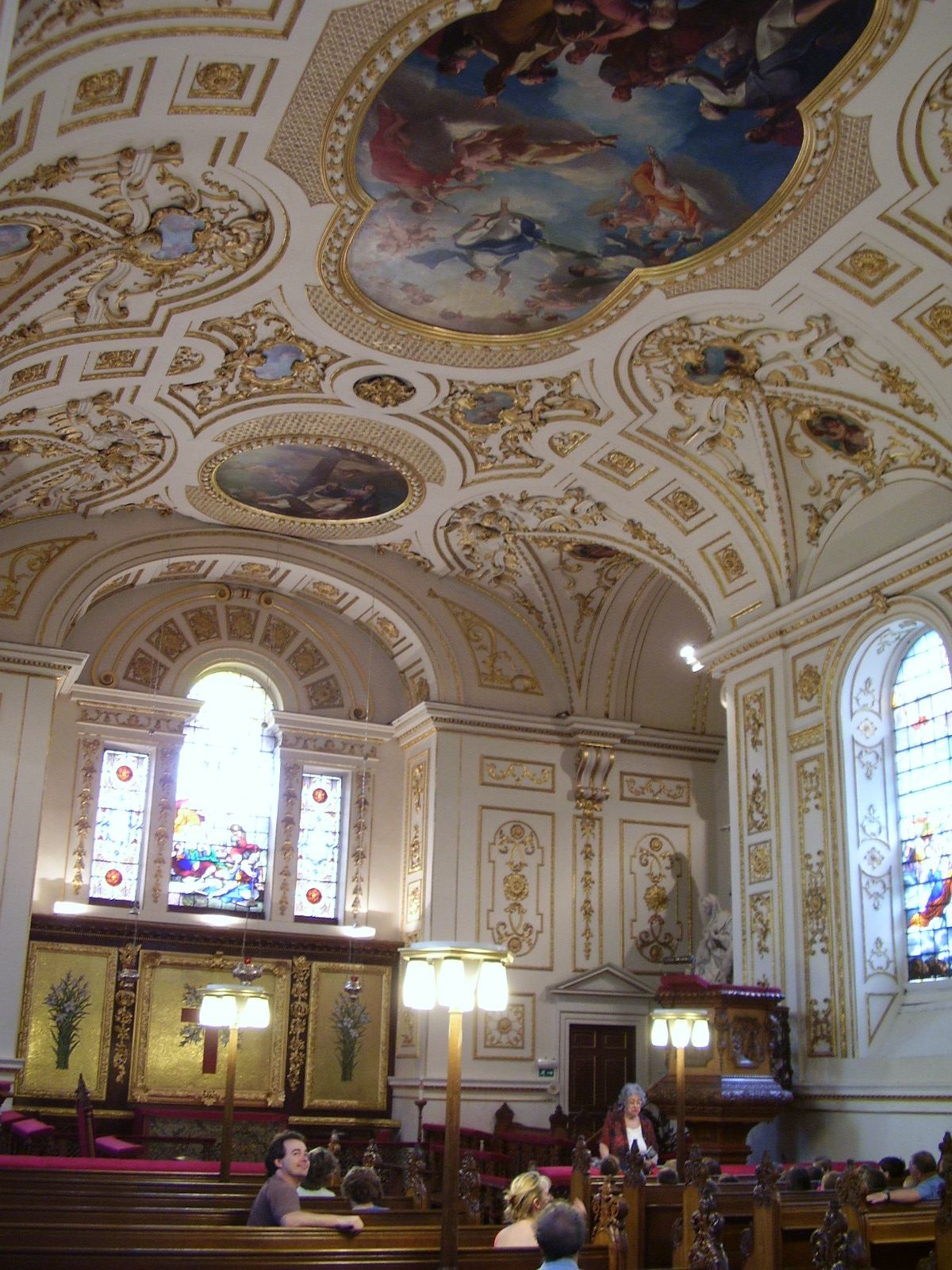
Interior of Great Witley Church

The church, of Saint Michael and All Angels, is a brick building but like the adjoining Witley Court was faced with bath stone by the Gloucester architect Samuel Daukes in the 1850s. The interior is one of the finest Italian Baroque churches in Britain originally from Cannons House at Edgware in Middlesex and fitted to Daukes's building by James Gibbs. It was completed in 1735.

It incorporates a richly gilded ceiling with a number of paintings by Antonio Bellucci, a funerary monument to Thomas Lord Foley and his family by John Michael Rysbrack and ten large painted stained glass windows by Joshua Price dated 1719–1721.

Beneath the church is the burial vault of the owners of Witley Court, where – among many others – William Ward, 1st Earl of Dudley, is buried in a splendid marble sarcophagus. In 2014 the crypt, which contains nine lead coffins, was reopened to the public and can now be visited on Saturdays and Sundays. On display there is also the restored Samuel Thorp clock. The clock was commissioned by a later Baron Foley in 1804 and served the Court and the Church until 1877 until it was replaced by the present clock.

=== Rectors ===
- Rev. Thomas Pearson,

== Hundred House Hotel ==
The village is home to the Grade II listed coaching inn The Hundred House Hotel, once the collection point for agricultural tithes from the districts or 'hundred (division)s' of the local area. In this instance the Doddingtree Hundred.
