= 2016 Women's PGA Championship =

Tournament information
- Dates: June 9–12, 2016
- Location: Sammamish, Washington; 47.635°N 122.057°W
- Courses: Sahalee Country Club (South & North nines)
- Organized by: PGA of America
- Tour: LPGA Tour
- Format: Stroke play - 72 holes

Statistics
- Par: 71
- Length: 6,624 yards (6,057 m)
- Field: 156 players, 75 after cut
- Cut: 149 (+7)
- Prize fund: $3.5 million
- Winner's share: $525,000

Champion
- (Canada) Brooke Henderson
- 278 (−6), playoff
- Location in the United States Location in Washington

The 2016 KPMG Women's PGA Championship was the 62nd Women's PGA Championship, played June 9–12 at Sahalee Country Club in Sammamish, Washington, a suburb east of Seattle. Brooke Henderson, 18, won her first major title with a birdie on the first hole of a sudden-death playoff with top-ranked Lydia Ko. It was the second win in a major by a Canadian and the first in 48 years. Henderson and Ko both had bogey-free final rounds with scores of 65 (−6) and 67 (−4), respectively.

Known as the LPGA Championship through 2014, it was the second of five major championships on the LPGA Tour during the 2016 season. This was the second year that the championship was organized by the PGA of America.

Sahalee hosted the PGA Championship in 1998, the first of three majors won by Vijay Singh. It was scheduled to host again in 2010, but the PGA of America reversed its decision and moved it to Whistling Straits in Wisconsin. The USGA helped fill that void with a senior major at Sahalee, the U.S. Senior Open in 2010, won by Bernhard Langer.

The Seattle area is an annual stop on the PGA Tour Champions with the Boeing Classic at TPC Snoqualmie Ridge in late August. The area formerly hosted the Safeco Classic, an LPGA Tour event from 1982 through 1999, held in September at Meridian Valley Country Club in Kent, southeast of Seattle.

== Course layout ==
Hole	1	2	3	4	5	6	7	8	9	Out	10	11	12	13	14	15	16	17	18	In	Total
Yards	384	507	388	390	163	496	419	433	173	3,353	397	543	432	152	370	396	379	181	421	3,271	6,624
Par	4	5	4	4	3	5	4	4	3	36	4	5	4	3	4	4	4	3	4	35	71

- South and North nines
- Hole 18 is par five for members

== Field ==
The field included 156 players who meet one or more of the selection criteria and commit to participate by a designated deadline.

Players who have qualified for the Championship are listed below. Players are listed under the first category in which they qualified; additional qualifying categories are shown in parentheses.

Players were eligible based on the following criteria:

1. Active LPGA Hall of Fame members

Juli Inkster (2), Se Ri Pak (2), Karrie Webb (2,4,5)

2. Past winners of the Women's PGA Championship

Laura Davies, Shanshan Feng (3,4,6), Cristie Kerr (4,6,8), Anna Nordqvist (4,5,6,8), Inbee Park (3,4,5,6), Suzann Pettersen (3,4,5,6,8), Yani Tseng (3)

3. Professionals who have won an LPGA major championship in the previous five years and during the current year

Choi Na-yeon (4,6), Chun In-gee (4,6), Kim Hyo-joo (4,5,6), Lydia Ko (4,6), Stacy Lewis (4,6,8), Brittany Lincicome (4,5,6,8), Mo Martin (4), Ryu So-yeon (4,6), Lexi Thompson (4,5,6,8), Michelle Wie (4,8), Yoo Sun-young

Jiyai Shin (6) did not play.

4. Professionals who have won an official LPGA tournament in the previous two calendar years and during the current year

Baek Kyu-jung, Chella Choi, Paula Creamer (8), Austin Ernst, Brooke Henderson (5,6), M. J. Hur, Jang Ha-na (6), Ariya Jutanugarn (6), Christina Kim, Kim Sei-young (5,6), Jessica Korda (6), Lee Mi-hyang, Minjee Lee (6), Mirim Lee, Haru Nomura (6), Lee-Anne Pace, Lizette Salas (8), Jenny Shin (6), Kris Tamulis, Amy Yang (6)

Ahn Sun-ju did not play.

5. Professionals who finished top-10 and ties at the previous year's Women's PGA Championship

Gerina Piller (6,8), Morgan Pressel (6,8)

6. Professionals ranked No. 1–30 on the Women's World Golf Rankings as of May 17, 2016

Charley Hull (8), Alison Lee (8)

Lee Bo-mee, Teresa Lu, and Park Sung-hyun did not play.

7. The top eight finishers at the 2015 LPGA T&CP National Championship

Jean Bartholomew, Jennifer Bermingham, Jessica Carafiello, Elizabeth Caron, Lisa Grimes, Karen Paolozzi, Laurie Rinker, Hillery Wilson

8. Members of the European and United States Solheim Cup teams in 2015

Carlota Ciganda, Sandra Gal, Caroline Hedwall, Karine Icher, Brittany Lang, Caroline Masson, Catriona Matthew, Azahara Muñoz, Gwladys Nocera, Melissa Reid, Angela Stanford

9. Maximum of two sponsor invites

Nicole Broch Larsen, Klára Spilková

10. LPGA members who have committed to the event, ranked in the order of their position on the 2016 official money list through the conclusion of the ShopRite LPGA Classic

Marina Alex, Brittany Altomare, Amy Anderson, Laetitia Beck, Christel Boeljon, Katie Burnett, Dori Carter, Sandra Changkija, Ssu-Chia Cheng, Cydney Clanton, Holly Clyburn, Jacqui Concolino, Brianna Do, Lindy Duncan, Jodi Ewart Shadoff, Simin Feng, Julieta Granada, Jaye Marie Green, Casey Grice, Mina Harigae, Céline Herbin, Nannette Hill, Wei-Ling Hsu, Vicky Hurst, Daniela Iacobelli, Ji Eun-hee, Tiffany Joh, Felicity Johnson, Jennifer Johnson, Moriya Jutanugarn, Danielle Kang, Haeji Kang, Kim Kaufman, Sarah Kemp, Megan Khang, In-Kyung Kim, SooBin Kim, Katherine Kirk, P.K. Kongkraphan, Stephanie Kono, Candie Kung, Min Seo Kwak, Maude-Aimee Leblanc, Ilhee Lee, Min Lee, Amelia Lewis, Xi Yu Lin, Pernilla Lindberg, Alejandra Llaneza, Gaby López, Lee Lopez, Briana Mao, Sydnee Michaels, Ai Miyazato, Mika Miyazato, Giulia Molinaro, Becky Morgan, Belen Mozo, Benyapa Niphatsophon, Su-Hyun Oh, Oh Ji-young, Ryann O'Toole, Annie Park, Park Hee-young, Jane Park, Sadena Parks, Pornanong Phatlum, Beatriz Recari, Paula Reto, Samantha Richdale, Marion Ricordeau, Rachel Rohanna, Giulia Sergas, Alena Sharp, Kelly Shon, Ashleigh Simon, Sarah Jane Smith, Christine Song, Jennifer Song, Nontaya Srisawang, Bertine Strauss, Budsabakorn Sukapan, Kelly Tan, Pannarat Thanapolboonyaras, Ayako Uehara, Mariajo Uribe, Cheyenne Woods, Jing Yan, Julie Yang, Sakura Yokomine

Joanna Klatten and Perrine Delacour did not play.

11. The remainder of the field will be filled by members who have committed to the event, ranked in the order of their position on the 2016 LPGA Priority List as of the commitment deadline

None needed

== Round summaries ==
=== First round ===
Thursday, June 9, 2016

Place	Player	Score	To par
1	(Canada) Brooke Henderson	67	−4
T2	(United States) Christina Kim	69	−2
T2	(South Korea) In-Kyung Kim	69	−2
T4	(United States) Tiffany Joh	70	−1
T4	(Thailand) Ariya Jutanugarn	70	−1
T4	(Australia) Minjee Lee	70	−1
T4	(South Korea) Park Hee-young	70	−1
T4	(Norway) Suzann Pettersen	70	−1
T4	(South Africa) Ashleigh Simon	70	−1
T10	(South Korea) Chella Choi	71	E
T10	(South Korea) Chun In-gee	71	E
T10	(United States) Austin Ernst	71	E
T10	(Australia) Katherine Kirk	71	E
T10	(New Zealand) Lydia Ko	71	E
T10	(South Korea) Mirim Lee	71	E
T10	(United States) Brittany Lincicome	71	E
T10	(United States) Jennifer Song	71	E
T10	(Thailand) Budsabakorn Sukapan	71	E
T10	(United States) Kris Tamulis	71	E

=== Second round ===
Friday, June 10, 2016

Place	Player	Score	To par
T1	(Canada) Brooke Henderson	67-73=140	−2
T1	(South Korea) Mirim Lee	71-69=140	−2
T3	(New Zealand) Lydia Ko	71-70=141	−1
T3	(United States) Brittany Lincicome	71-70=141	−1
T3	(United States) Gerina Piller	72-69=141	−1
T6	(United States) Tiffany Joh	70-72=142	E
T6	(South Korea) In-Kyung Kim	69-73=142	E
T6	(Japan) Ai Miyazato	72-70=142	E
T6	(Australia) Su-Hyun Oh	73-69=142	E
T6	(South Korea) Ryu So-yeon	72-70=142	E

=== Third round ===
Saturday, June 11, 2016

Place	Player	Score	To par
1	(New Zealand) Lydia Ko	71-70-70=211	−2
T2	(United States) Brittany Lincicome	71-70-71=212	−1
T2	(United States) Gerina Piller	72-69-71=212	−1
T4	(South Korea) Chella Choi	71-73-69=213	E
T4	(Canada) Brooke Henderson	67-73-73=213	E
T4	(Thailand) Ariya Jutanugarn	70-75-68=213	E
T4	(South Korea) Mirim Lee	71-69-73=213	E
T4	(Sweden) Anna Nordqvist	73-71-69=213	E
T4	(South Korea) Amy Yang	74-73-66=213	E
T10	(United States) Tiffany Joh	70-72-72=214	+1
T10	(South Korea) In-Kyung Kim	69-73-72=214	+1
T10	(Scotland) Catriona Matthew	76-67-71=214	+1
T10	(Australia) Su-Hyun Oh	73-69-72=214	+1
T10	(Norway) Suzann Pettersen	70-73-71=214	+1

=== Final round ===
Sunday, June 12, 2016

Place	Player	Score	To par	Money ($)
T1	(Canada) Brooke Henderson	67-73-73-65=278	−6	Playoff
T1	(New Zealand) Lydia Ko	71-70-70-67=278	−6	Playoff
3	(Thailand) Ariya Jutanugarn	70-75-68-66=279	−5	233,352
T4	(South Korea) Mirim Lee	71-69-73-69=282	−2	148,230
T4	(South Korea) Park Hee-young	70-74-72-66=282	−2	148,230
T4	(South Korea) Ryu So-yeon	72-70-73-67=282	−2	148,230
7	(South Korea) Amy Yang	74-73-66-70=283	−1	99,505
T8	(South Korea) Chella Choi	71-73-69-71=284	E	78,959
T8	(Sweden) Anna Nordqvist	73-71-69-71=284	E	78,959
T8	(Australia) Su-Hyun Oh	73-69-72-70=284	E	78,959

==== Scorecard ====
Final round

Hole	1	2	3	4	5	6	7	8	9	10	11	12	13	14	15	16	17	18
Par	4	5	4	4	3	5	4	4	3	4	5	4	3	4	4	4	3	4
(Canada) Henderson	E	−1	−1	−1	−1	−2	−2	−2	−2	−2	−4	−4	−5	−5	−5	−5	−6	−6
(New Zealand) Ko	−3	−3	−3	−4	−4	−4	−4	−5	−5	−5	−6	−6	−6	−6	−6	−6	−6	−6
(Thailand) Jutanugarn	E	E	E	E	E	−1	−1	−1	−2	−2	−2	−3	−3	−3	−3	−4	−5	−5
(South Korea) Lee	E	E	−1	−1	−2	−3	−2	−2	−1	−2	−2	−2	−2	−2	−1	−2	−2	−2
(South Korea) Park	+2	+2	+2	+2	+2	E	E	−1	−1	−2	−2	−2	−2	−2	−2	−2	−2	−2
(South Korea) Ryu	+1	E	E	−1	−1	−1	−1	E	E	E	−2	−1	−1	−1	−1	−1	−2	−2
(United States) Piller	−1	−2	−2	−2	−2	−2	−3	−2	−2	−1	−1	E	E	E	E	E	+2	+2
(United States) Lincicome	−1	−1	−1	E	−1	E	E	+1	+1	+3	+2	+2	+3	+4	+4	+4	+5	+5

Cumulative tournament scores, relative to par

Eagle	Birdie	Bogey	Double bogey

==== Playoff ====
The sudden-death playoff lasted one hole, played on the par-4 18th hole, an uphill dogleg left at 421 yards (385 m). Both players hit the green with their approach shots from the fairway. Ko had a putt of about 20 feet (6 m) that slipped by the left side. Henderson's birdie putt from less than three feet (0.9 m) won the title.

Place	Player	Score	To par	Money ($)
1	(Canada) Brooke Henderson	3	−1	525,000
2	(New Zealand) Lydia Ko	4	E	321,675
