= 2015 U.S. Women's Open =

Golf tournament

Coordinates: 40.062°N 76.271°W

Tournament information
- Dates: July 9–12, 2015
- Location: Lancaster, Pennsylvania
- Course: Lancaster Country Club
- Organized by: USGA
- Tour: LPGA Tour

Statistics
- Par: 70
- Length: 6,483 yards (5,928 m)
- Field: 156 players, 63 after cut
- Cut: 144 (+4)
- Prize fund: $4.5 million
- Winner's share: $810,000

Champion
- (South Korea) Chun In-gee
- 272 (−8)

Location in the United States
Location in Pennsylvania

The 2015 U.S. Women's Open was the 70th U.S. Women's Open, held July 9–12 at Lancaster Country Club in Lancaster, Pennsylvania. The U.S. Women's Open is the oldest of the five current major championships and the third of the 2015 season.

Chun In-gee won the tournament in her first appearance.

It had the largest purse in women's golf, at $4.5 million in 2015. Additionally, the tournament set an attendance record for the U.S. Women's Open at 135,000 spectators for the week. The tournament was televised by Fox Sports 1 and Fox Sports.

== Qualifying and field ==
The championship is open to any female professional or amateur golfer with a USGA handicap index not exceeding 2.4. Players qualify by competing in one of twenty 36-hole qualifying tournaments held at sites across the United States and at international sites in China, England, Japan, and South Korea. Additional players were exempt from qualifying because of past performances in professional or amateur tournaments around the world.

The United States Golf Association received a record 1,873 entries for the championship.

=== Exempt from qualifying ===
Many players are exempt in multiple categories. Players are listed only once, in the first category in which they became exempt, with additional categories in parentheses ( ) next to their names. Golfers qualifying in Category 13 who qualified in other categories are denoted with the tour by which they qualified.

1. Winners of the U.S. Women's Open for the last ten years (2005–2014)
Na Yeon Choi (10,12,15,16), Paula Creamer (10,15,16), Eun-Hee Ji (10), Cristie Kerr (10,11,12,15,16), Birdie Kim, Inbee Park (5,7,10,11,12,15,16), So Yeon Ryu (9,10,12,15,16), Michelle Wie (9,10,15,16)

- Exempt but did not enter tournament: Annika Sörenstam

2. Winner and runner-up from the 2014 U.S. Women's Amateur (must be an amateur)
Kristen Gillman

- The runner-up, Brooke Henderson, turned professional in December 2014, forfeiting this exemption. She had previously qualified in category 9.

3. Winners of the 2014 and 2015 British Ladies Amateur Golf Championship (must be an amateur)
Céline Boutier (2015)

- The 2014 winner, Emily Kristine Pedersen, was eligible but did not enter the tournament.

4. Winner of the 2014 Mark H. McCormack Medal (Women's World Amateur Golf Ranking) (must be an amateur)

- Minjee Lee turned professional in December 2014, forfeiting her exemption from qualifying. She later qualified under categories 12 and 16.

5. Winners of the Women's PGA Championship for the last five years (2011–2015)
Shanshan Feng (10,12,15,16), Yani Tseng (6,10)

6. Winners of the Ricoh Women's British Open for the last five years (2010–2014)
Stacy Lewis (7,9,10,11,12,15,16), Mo Martin (10,12,15,16)

- Jiyai Shin (13-JLPGA,15,16) qualified but did not enter the tournament

7. Winners of the ANA Inspiration for the last five years (2011–2015)
Brittany Lincicome (10,11,15,16), Lexi Thompson (9,10,15,16), Sun-Young Yoo (10)

8. Winners of the Evian Championship (2013–2014)
Kim Hyo-joo (11,12,13-KLPGA,15,16), Suzann Pettersen (10,15,16)

9. Ten lowest scorers and anyone tying for 10th place from the 2014 U.S. Women's Open
Brooke Henderson, Meena Lee (10), Catriona Matthew (10,15,16), Stephanie Meadow, Pornanong Phatlum (10,15,16), Jenny Shin (10,15,16), Amy Yang (10,11,12,15,16), Sakura Yokomine

10. Top 75 money leaders from the 2014 final official LPGA money list
Marina Alex, Dori Carter, Chella Choi (15,16), Carlota Ciganda (13-LET,15,16), Laura Davies, Laura Diaz, Austin Ernst (12), Jodi Ewart Shadoff, Sandra Gal (15,16), Julieta Granada (15,16), Mina Harigae, Caroline Hedwall, M. J. Hur (12), Karine Icher, Tiffany Joh, Moriya Jutanugarn, Danielle Kang, Haeji Kang, Kim Kaufman, Christina Kim (12), I.K. Kim (15), Katherine Kirk, Lydia Ko (11,12,15,16), Jessica Korda (15,16), Candie Kung, Brittany Lang (16), Ilhee Lee (15,16), Mi Hyang Lee (12,15,16), Mirim Lee (11,12,15,16), Amelia Lewis, Pernilla Lindberg, Caroline Masson, Sydnee Michaels, Belen Mozo, Azahara Muñoz (15,16), Haru Nomura, Anna Nordqvist (12,15,16), Ji Young Oh, Lee-Anne Pace (12,13-LET,15), Hee Young Park (15), Gerina Piller (15,16), Morgan Pressel (11,15,16), Beatriz Recari, Lizette Salas (15,16), Dewi Claire Schreefel, Sarah Jane Smith, Angela Stanford (15,16), Thidapa Suwannapura, Kris Tamulis, Ayako Uehara, Mariajo Uribe, Line Vedel, Karrie Webb (15,16)

- Se Ri Pak withdrew from the tournament on June 21 and was replaced by Georgia Hall, the first alternate from the Buckinghamshire qualifier.
- Jennifer Johnson withdrew on July 6 citing "medical reasons." She was replaced by Mallory Blackwelder, the first alternate from the Scottsdale, Arizona qualifier.

11. Top 10 money leaders from the 2015 official LPGA money list, through the close of entries on May 6
Kim Sei-young (12,15,16)

12. Winners of LPGA co-sponsored events, whose victories are considered official, from the conclusion of the 2014 U.S. Women's Open to the initiation of the 2015 U.S. Women's Open
Q Baek (13-KLPGA,15,16), Minjee Lee (16)

13. Top five money leaders from the 2014 Japan LPGA Tour, Korea LPGA Tour and Ladies European Tour
Japan LPGA Tour: Teresa Lu (15,16), Misuzu Narita
Korea LPGA Tour: Heo Yoon-kyung (15), Lee Jung-min (15,16), Chun In-gee (15,16)
Ladies European Tour: Charley Hull (15,16), Gwladys Nocera

- Sun-Ju Ahn (15,16) (JLPGA), Lee Bo-mee (15,16) (JLPGA) and Nikki Campbell (LET) qualified but did not enter the tournament.
- Heo Yoon-kyung (15) qualified but withdrew from the tournament on July 8 with a knee injury. She was replaced by Ally McDonald, the first alternate from the Atlanta, Georgia qualifier.

14. Top three money leaders from the 2014 China LPGA Tour.
Xi Yu Lin, Babe Liu, Yanhong Pan

15. Top 50 point leaders from the current Rolex Rankings and anyone tying for 50th place as of May 6, 2015
Jang Ha-na (16), Ariya Jutanugarn

- Kim Min-sun (16) and Ko Jin-young (16) qualified but did not enter the tournament.

16. Top 50 point leaders from the current Rolex Rankings and anyone tying for 50th place as of July 5, 2015
Shiho Oyama

- Momoko Ueda qualified but did not enter the tournament.

17. Special exemptions selected by the USGA

- None offered.

=== Qualifiers ===
Additional players qualify through sectional qualifying tournaments taking place between May 9 and June 15 at 25 sites in the United States, China, South Korea, England, and Japan.

(a) denotes amateur

May 9 at Ka’anapali Golf Resort (Royal Course), Lahaina, Hawaii

Mariel Galdiano (a)

May 13 at CGA Nanshan International Training Center (Garden Course), Shandong, China

Yuting Shi

May 18 at Serrano Country Club, El Dorado Hills, California

Jennifer Coleman, Beth Lillie (a)

May 18 at Bradenton Country Club, Bradenton, Florida

Daniela Darquea (a), Regina Plasencia (a)

May 18 at Druid Hills Golf Club, Atlanta, Georgia

Brooke Pancake, Jane Park

May 18 at Westmoreland Country Club, Wilmette, Illinois

Christina Foster (a), Elizabeth Nagel

May 18 at Windsong Farm Golf Club, Independence, Minnesota

Sarah Burnham (a)

May 18 at Butler Country Club, Butler, Pennsylvania

Lori Adams (a), Nikolette Schroeder (a)

May 18 at Hermitage Country Club, Manakin-Sabot, Virginia

Alejandra Llaneza, Mika Miyazato, Jennifer Song

May 18 at Woo Jeong Hills Country Club, Chungnam, South Korea

So-Young Lee (a), Min Gyeong Youn (a)

May 19 at Superstition Mountain Golf & Country Club, Gold Canyon, Arizona

Jimin Kang, Lindsey Weaver (a)

May 19 at Goose Creek Golf Club, Mira Loma, California

Alison Lee, Lilia Khatu Vu (a)

May 22 at Fountains Country Club (North Course), Lake Worth, Florida

Wei-Ling Hsu, Ryann O'Toole

May 25 at Buckinghamshire Golf Club, Buckinghamshire, England

Holly Aitchison, Maria Balikoeva, Heather Macrae, Lauren Taylor, Kylie Walker

May 26 at Industry Hills Golf Club, City of Industry, California

Lee Lopez, Angella Then (a)

May 27 at Riverdale Golf Course, Brighton, Colorado

Bertine Strauss (a), María Fassi (a)

May 27 at Governors Club, Chapel Hill, North Carolina

Lauren Doughtie, Su-Hyun Oh

May 29 at Sugar Mill Country Club (White/Red Course), New Smyrna Beach, Florida

Haley Italia, Haruka Morita-WanyaoLu

June 1 at Galloway National Golf Club, Galloway, New Jersey

Natalie Gulbis, Nontaya Srisawang

June 2 at Ferncroft Country Club, Middleton, Massachusetts

Stephanie Connelly, Megan Khang (a)

June 2 at St. Clair Country Club, Belleville, Illinois

Breanna Elliott, Emma Talley (a)

June 2 at OGA Golf Course, Woodburn, Oregon

Muni He (a), Hannah O'Sullivan (a)

June 2 at The Woodlands Country Club (Player Course), The Woodlands, Texas

Christel Boeljon, Gaby López (a)

June 4 at Lakewood Country Club, Dallas, Texas

Dylan Kim (a), Jennifer Park (a)

June 15 at Arima Royal Golf Club, Hyōgo Prefecture, Japan

Lala Anai, Erika Kikuchi, Ayaka Matsumori, Ai Suzuki, Suzuka Yamaguchi (a), Rumi Yoshiba

=== Alternates added to field ===
The following players were added to the field before the start of the tournament when spots reserved for exemptions in various categories were not used and to replace players who withdrew from the tournament.

Mallory Blackwelder, Jaye Marie Green, Georgia Hall, Min Lee, Nikki Long (a), Ally McDonald, Samantha Wagner

== Course layout ==
Hole	1	2	3	4	5	6	7	8	9	Out	10	11	12	13	14	15	16	17	18	In	Total
Yards	407	374	399	346	392	172	482	198	421	3,191	428	416	169	508	389	414	353	178	437	3,292	6,483
Par	4	4	4	4	4	3	5	3	4	35	4	4	3	5	4	4	4	3	4	35	70

== Round summaries ==
=== First round ===
Thursday and Friday, July 9–10, 2015

The first round was incomplete Thursday due to weather; play was completed on Friday morning before the beginning of the second round.

Place	Player	Score	To par
T1	(United States) Marina Alex	66	−4
T1	(United States) Jane Park	66	−4
T1	(Australia) Karrie Webb	66	−4
T4	(South Korea) Na Yeon Choi	67	−3
T4	(South Korea) Amy Yang	67	−3
T6	(South Korea) Chun In-gee	68	−2
T6	(United States) Austin Ernst	68	−2
T6	(China) Muni He (a)	68	−2
T6	(South Korea) Mi Hyang Lee	68	−2
T6	(United States) Sydnee Michaels	68	−2
T6	(United States) Elizabeth Nagel	68	−2
T6	(South Korea) Inbee Park	68	−2
T6	(United States) Morgan Pressel	68	−2

=== Second round ===
Friday, July 10, 2015

Place	Player	Score	To par
1	(South Korea) Amy Yang	67-66=133	−7
T2	(United States) Stacy Lewis	69-67=136	−4
T2	(Japan) Shiho Oyama	70-66=136	−4
4	(United States) Marina Alex	66-71=137	−3
T5	(South Korea) Chun In-gee	68-70=138	−2
T5	(South Korea) Inbee Park	68-70=138	−2
T5	(United States) Jane Park	66-72=138	−2
T5	(United States) Morgan Pressel	68-70=138	−2
T5	(Australia) Karrie Webb	66-72=138	−2
T5	(Japan) Rumi Yoshiba	70-68=138	−2

=== Third round ===
Saturday, July 11, 2015

Place	Player	Score	To par
1	(South Korea) Amy Yang	67-66-69=202	−8
2	(United States) Stacy Lewis	69-67-69=205	−5
3	(South Korea) Chun In-gee	68-70-68=206	−4
4	(Japan) Shiho Oyama	70-66-71=207	−3
T5	(South Korea) Chella Choi	71-73-64=208	−2
T5	(South Korea) Mi Hyang Lee	68-72-68=208	−2
T5	(South Korea) Inbee Park	68-70-70=208	−2
T5	(United States) Michelle Wie	72-68-68=208	−2
T9	(Taiwan) Min Lee	71-68-70=209	−1
T9	(United States) Jane Park	66-72-71=209	−1
T9	(United States) Morgan Pressel	68-70-71=209	−1

=== Final round ===
Sunday, July 12, 2015

Place	Player	Score	To par	Money ($)
1	(South Korea) Chun In-gee	68-70-68-66=272	−8	810,000
2	(South Korea) Amy Yang	67-66-69-71=273	−7	486,000
T3	(United States) Stacy Lewis	69-67-69-70=275	−5	267,072
T3	(South Korea) Inbee Park	68-70-70-67=275	−5	267,072
T5	(Canada) Brooke Henderson	70-73-68-66=277	−3	141,396
T5	(Sweden) Pernilla Lindberg	70-70-70-67=277	−3	141,396
T5	(Japan) Shiho Oyama	70-66-71-70=277	−3	141,396
T5	(United States) Jane Park	66-72-71-68=277	−3	141,396
T5	(United States) Morgan Pressel	68-70-71-68=277	−3	141,396
T5	(South Korea) So Yeon Ryu	72-68-70-67=277	−3	141,396

==== Scorecard ====
Final round

Hole	1	2	3	4	5	6	7	8	9	10	11	12	13	14	15	16	17	18
Par	4	4	4	4	4	3	5	3	4	4	4	3	5	4	4	4	3	4
(South Korea) Chun	−5	−5	−6	−6	−6	−6	−7	−6	−6	−5	−5	−6	−6	−6	−7	−8	−9	−8
(South Korea) Yang	−8	−8	−8	−8	−7	−8	−9	−9	−8	−8	−7	−7	−7	−6	−5	−7	−8	−7
(United States) Lewis	−6	−6	−6	−6	−4	−4	−5	−5	−5	−5	−5	−5	−6	−6	−4	−5	−5	−5
(South Korea) Park	−2	−3	−2	−2	−2	−3	−3	−2	−2	−3	−3	−3	−4	−4	−4	−5	−4	−5

Cumulative tournament scores, relative to par
