= PHC Classic =

Golf tournament in Wisconsin

Tournament information
- Location: Milwaukee, Wisconsin
- Established: 2015
- Course(s): Brown Deer Park Golf Course
- Par: 72
- Tour(s): Symetra Tour
- Format: Stroke play
- Prize fund: $125,000
- Month played: August
- Final year: 2020

Current champion
- (United States) Robynn Ree

The PHC Classic was a tournament on the Symetra Tour, the LPGA's developmental tour. It was part of the Symetra Tour's schedule between 2015 and 2020. It was held at Brown Deer Park Golf Course in Milwaukee, Wisconsin, host venue for the PGA Tour's Greater Milwaukee Open.

The 2020 tournament was cancelled due to the COVID-19 pandemic.

Title sponsor Potawatomi Hotel & Casino later suspended its sponsorship due to COVID-19's impact on the hospitality industry.

== Winners ==
Year	Date	Winner	Country	Score	Margin of victory	Runner(s)-up	Purse ($)	Winner's share ($)	Ref
2020	Aug 7–9	Tournament cancelled					125,000	18,750	
2019	Aug 9–11	Robynn Ree	United States	199 (−17)	3 strokes	(United States) Vicky Hurst	125,000	18,750	
2018	Aug 10–12	Lauren Coughlin	United States	200 (−16)	1 stroke	(Philippines) Dottie Ardina	100,000	15,000	
2017	Aug 4–6	Brittany Marchand	Canada	203 (−13)	3 strokes	(France) Marion Ricordeau	100,000	15,000	
2016	Aug 19–21	Laura Gonzalez Escallon	Belgium	206 (−10)	1 stroke	(United States) Erynne Lee	100,000	15,000	
2015	Jul 31 – Aug 2	Annie Park	United States	211 (−5)	Playoff	(United States) Lee Lopez	100,000	15,000	
