= 2015 Symetra Tour =

The 2015 Symetra Tour was a series of professional women's golf tournaments held from February through October 2015 in the United States. The Symetra Tour is the second-tier women's professional golf tour in the United States and is the "official developmental tour" of the LPGA Tour. It was previously known as the Futures Tour. In 2015, total prize money on the Symetra Tour was $2,420,000.

== Leading money winners ==
The top ten money winners at the end of the season gained fully exempt cards on the LPGA Tour for the 2016 season.

Rank	Player	Country	Events	Prize money ($)
1	Annie Park	United States	11	68,673
2	Giulia Molinaro	Italy	18	68,632
3	Brianna Do	United States	22	64,877
4	Daniela Iacobelli	United States	22	62,692
5	Dani Holmqvist	Sweden	20	62,160
6	Lee Lopez	United States	22	61,731
7	Alejandra Llaneza	Mexico	19	61,289
8	Vicky Hurst	United States	15	57,814
9	Casey Grice	United States	22	55,621
10	Rachel Rohanna	United States	21	53,867

== Schedule and results ==
The number in parentheses after winners' names show the player's total number of official money, individual event wins on the Symetra Tour including that event.

Date	Tournament	Location	Winner
Feb 22	Gateway Classic	Arizona	(United States) Hannah O'Sullivan (1) (a)
Mar 1	Volvik Championship	California	(United States) Katie Kempter (1)
Mar 29	Florida's Natural Charity Classic	Florida	(Canada) Sue Kim (2)
Apr 19	Chico's Patty Berg Memorial	Florida	(Canada) Augusta James (1)
Apr 26	Guardian Retirement Championship	Florida	(United States) Rachel Rohanna (1)
May 10	Self Regional Healthcare Foundation Women's Health Charity Classic	South Carolina	(Mexico) Alejandra Llaneza (1)
May 17	Mission Health Wellness Classic	North Carolina	(South Korea) Jimin Kang (4)
May 23	Symetra Classic	North Carolina	(China) Haruka Morita-WanyaoLu (1)
Jun 7	FireKeepers Casino Hotel Championship	Michigan	(United States) Madeleine Sheils (1)
Jun 14	Decatur-Forsyth Classic	Illinois	(South Korea) Jimin Kang (n/a)
Jun 21	Four Winds Invitational	Indiana	(Canada) Brooke Henderson (1)
Jun 28	Island Resort Championship	Michigan	(Sweden) Dani Holmqvist (1)
Jul 5	Tullymore Classic	Michigan	(United States) Daniela Iacobelli (2)
Jul 19	Toyota Danielle Downey Classic	New York	(United States) Annie Park (1)
Jul 26	Fuccillo Kia Championship	New York	(Australia) Breanna Elliott (1)
Aug 2	PHC Classic	Wisconsin	(United States) Annie Park (2)
Aug 16	W. B. Mason Championship	Massachusetts	(United States) Vicky Hurst (6)
Sep 6	Sioux Falls GreatLIFE Challenge	South Dakota	(Norway) Caroline Westrup (1)
Sep 13	Prairie Band Casino & Resort Charity Classic	Kansas	(United States) Annie Park (3)
Sep 20	Garden City Charity Classic	Kansas	(United States) Vicky Hurst (7)
Sep 27	Murphy USA El Dorado Shootout	Arkansas	(United States) Jackie Stoelting (1)
Oct 11	IOA Golf Classic	Florida	(United States) Jackie Stoelting (2)
Oct 18	Symetra Tour Championship	Florida	(Thailand) Sherman Santiwiwatthanaphong (1)

== Awards ==
- Player of the Year, player who leads the money list at the end of the season
  - (United States) Annie Park
- Gaëlle Truet Rookie of the Year Award, first year player with the highest finish on the official money list
  - (United States) Annie Park

== See also ==
- 2015 LPGA Tour
- 2015 in golf
