= IOA Golf Classic =

Golf tournament in Florida

Tournament information
- Location: Longwood, Florida
- Established: 2013
- Course: Alaqua Country Club
- Par: 71
- Length: 6,182 yards (5,653 m)
- Tour: Epson Tour
- Format: Stroke play
- Prize fund: $200,000
- Month played: March

Tournament record score
- Aggregate: 198 Grace Kim (2022)
- To par: −18 as above

Current champion
- (South Korea) Lee Jeong-eun

The IOA Golf Classic is a tournament on the Epson Tour, the LPGA's developmental tour. It has been a part of the tour's schedule since 2013. It is held at Alaqua Country Club in Longwood, Florida.

The 2016 event was cancelled due to Hurricane Matthew.

== Winners ==
Year	Date	Winner	Country	Score	Margin of victory	Runner(s)-up	Purse ($)	Winner's share ($)
2026	Mar 15	Lee Jeong-eun	South Korea	200 (−13)	1 stroke	(South Korea) Jeon Ji-won	200,000	30,000
2025	Mar 16	Gina Kim	United States	202 (−11)	1 stroke	(South Korea) Kang Min-ji	225,000	33,750
2024	Mar 17	Jessica Peng	Chinese Taipei	202 (−11)	1 stroke	(United States) Lindsey McCurdy	200,000	30,000
2023	May 21	Jenny Coleman	United States	132 (−10)	Playoff	(Philippines) Dottie Ardina (Germany) Sophie Hausmann	200,000	30,000
2022	May 22	Grace Kim	Australia	195 (−18)	5 strokes	(South Korea) Jang Hyo-joon (Australia) Sarah Jane Smith	200,000	30,000
2021	May 23	Allison Emrey	United States	203 (−10)	Playoff	(United States) Amanda Doherty	175,000	26,250
2020	Sep 27	Laura Wearn	United States	203 (−10)	Playoff	(United States) Haylee Harford	175,000	26,250
2019	Sep 29	Marta Sanz Barrio	Spain	200 (−13)	1 stroke	(United States) Mind Muangkhumsakul	175,000	26,250
2018	Sep 30	Ruixin Liu	China	199 (−14)	1 stroke	(Philippines) Dottie Ardina (South Korea) Simin Feng (United States) Dana Finkelstein	150,000	22,500
2017	Oct 1	Hannah Green	Australia	200 (−13)	2 strokes	(United States) Katelyn Dambaugh	100,000	15,000
2016	Oct 9	Canceled due to Hurricane Matthew					100,000	15,000
2015	Oct 11	Jackie Stoelting	United States	201 (−12)	2 strokes	(United States) Brianna Do	100,000	15,000
2014	Mar 31	Kendall Dye	United States	202 (−11)	3 strokes	(United States) Hannah Yun	100,000	15,000
2013	Aug 11	Katy Harris	United States	209 (−7)	1 stroke	(Mexico) Alejandra Llaneza	100,000	15,000
