= Louisiana Pelican Classic =

The Louisiana Pelican Classic was an annual golf tournament for professional women golfers on the Futures Tour, the LPGA's developmental tour. The event was a part of the Futures Tour's schedule from 2006 to 2009. It took place at The Wetlands Golf Course in Lafayette, Louisiana.

The tournament was a 54-hole event, as are most Futures Tour tournaments, and includes pre-tournament pro-am opportunities, in which local amateur golfers can play with the professional golfers from the Tour as a benefit for local charities. The benefiting charity from the Louisiana Pelican Classic is Goodwill Industries of Acadiana.

== Winners ==
| Year | Dates | Champion | Country | Score | Purse ($) | Winner's share ($) |
|---|---|---|---|---|---|---|
| 2009 | Apr 17–19 | Samantha Richdale | Canada | 136 (−8)* | 90,000 | 12,600 |
| 2008 | Apr 18–20 | M. J. Hur | South Korea | 206 (−10) | 85,000 | 11,900 |
| 2007 | Apr 20–22 | Janell Howland | United States | 205 (−11) | 75,000 | 10,500 |
| 2006 | Apr 7–9 | Song-Hee Kim | South Korea | 213 (−3) | 75,000 | 10,500 |

* Tournament shortened to 36 holes due to rain.

== Tournament record ==
| Year | Player | Score | Round |
|---|---|---|---|
| 2008 | Vicky Hurst | 64 (−8) | 2nd |
