= Self Regional Healthcare Foundation Women's Health Classic =

Golf tournament in South Carolina

Women's Health Classic
Tournament information
- Location: Greenwood, South Carolina
- Established: 2014
- Course(s): The Links at Stoney Point
- Par: 72
- Tour(s): Symetra Tour
- Format: Stroke play
- Prize fund: $200,000
- Month played: May
- Final year: 2018

Final champion
- (United States) Vicky Hurst

The Self Regional Healthcare Foundation Women's Health Classic was a tournament on the Symetra Tour, the LPGA's developmental tour. It was part of the Symetra Tour's schedule between 2014 and 2018. It was held at The Links at Stoney Point in Greenwood, South Carolina.

Title sponsor was Self Regional Healthcare, a hospital in Greenwood. At inception it featured the Symetra Tour's largest purse, totaling $200,000.

In 2016 it was a joint event with the Legends Tour's Legends at Stoney Point.

== Winners ==
Year	Date	Winner	Country	Score	Margin of victory	Runner-up	Purse ($)	Winner's share ($)	Ref
Self Regional Healthcare Foundation Women's Health Classic
2018	May 10–13	Vicky Hurst	United States	279 (−9)	1 stroke	(Philippines) Dottie Ardina	200,000	30,000	
2017	May 11–14	Céline Boutier	France	278 (−10)	Playoff	(Colombia) Paola Moreno	200,000	30,000	
2016	May 5–8	Madelene Sagström	Sweden	278 (−6)	6 strokes	(Thailand) Wichanee Meechai	250,000	37,500	
2015	May 7–10	Alejandra Llaneza	Mexico	278 (−10)	1 stroke	(United States) Casey Grice	200,000	30,000	
Self Regional Healthcare Foundation Women's Health Charity Classic
2014	May 8–11	Wei-Ling Hsu	Chinese Taipei	280 (−8)	5 strokes	(France) Joanna Klatten	200,000	30,000	
