= Gabriella Then =

American professional golfer (born 1995)

Personal information
- Nickname: Gabby
- Nationality: United States
- Born: October 22, 1995 (age 31) Whittier, California, U.S.
- Height: 5 ft 6 in (1.68 m)

Career
- Sport: Golf
- College: University of Southern California
- Turned professional: 2017
- Current tours: Ladies European Tour; Epson Tour
- Former tour: LPGA Tour
- Professional wins: 2

Number of wins by tour
- Epson Tour: 1
- Other: 1

Best results in LPGA major championships
- Chevron Championship: CUT: 2023
- Women's PGA C'ship: CUT: 2023
- U.S. Women's Open: CUT: 2010, 2011, 2013
- Women's British Open: DNP
- Evian Championship: DNP

Gabriella Then (born October 22, 1995) is an American professional golfer who plays on the LPGA Tour, Epson Tour and the Ladies European Tour.

== Early life, college and amateur career ==
Then was born in Whittier, California and grew up in Rancho Cucamonga, California. She is of Chinese, Indonesian and Dutch ancestry. Then picked up golf at age five, recorded her first birdie at age eight, and started tournament golf at nine. She qualified for the U.S. Women's Amateur at age 12, and competed in her first U.S. Women's Open at age 14.

In 2011, Then was part of the victorious United States team at the Junior Solheim Cup in Ireland. Two years later, she won the 2013 U.S. Girls' Junior Championship at Sycamore Hills Golf Club in Fort Wayne.

Then attended the University of Southern California where she studied communications and played college golf with the USC Trojans women's golf team between 2013 and 2017. Her teammates included later LPGA members Sophia Popov and Annie Park, and they came close at the national championship on two occasions, including the 2015 NCAA Championship where they lost in the semi-finals. She had one college win, was named All-American in 2015, and set the school record for rounds played (245) over the course of her four-year career.

== Professional career ==
Then turned professional in 2017 and joined the Epson Tour. After three seasons, with a best finish of T4 at the 2017 PHC Classic, Then gave up professional golf and took a job in marketing and sales at a cosmetics company.

In 2021, after an 18 months break, Then began playing tournament golf again and played on the Cactus Tour and the WAPT Tour, where she won her first professional events. She won the LET Q-School at the La Manga Club and started playing on the Ladies European Tour in 2022.

In April 2022, she won the Garden City Charity Classic at Buffalo Dunes, her first title on the Epson Tour.

== Personal life ==
Then met her partner Eric Sugimoto, a professional golfer who has played on the Japan Golf Tour, at USC.

As of April 3, 2026, Then has been engaged to her partner Ken Kirby.

== Amateur wins ==
- 2011 Rolex Tournament of Champions
- 2013 Scott Robertson Memorial, U.S. Girls' Junior Championship
- 2015 UC Irvine Invitational

== Professional wins (2) ==
=== Epson Tour wins (1) ===
No.	Date	Tournament	Winning score	To par	Margin of victory	Runner-up	Winner's share ($)
1	Apr 29, 2022	Garden City Charity Classic at Buffalo Dunes	67-70-67=204	−12	2 strokes	(United States) Alexa Pano	30,000

=== Women's All Pro Tour wins (1) ===
- 2021 Kathy Whitworth Paris Championship

== Results in LPGA majors ==
Results not in chronological order.

! Tournament	2010	2011	2012	2013	2014	2015	2016	2017	2018	2019	2020	2021	2022	2023
Chevron Championship														CUT
Women's PGA Championship														CUT
U.S. Women's Open	CUT	CUT		CUT										
The Evian Championship ^											NT			
Women's British Open														

^ The Evian Championship was added as a major in 2013

Did not play

CUT = missed the half-way cut
NT = no tournament

== U.S. national team appearances ==
Amateur

- Junior Solheim Cup: 2011 (winners)
