= Cactus Tour =

US developmental golf tour

- Sport: Golf
- Founded: 2005
- Country: United States
- Continent: North America
- Related competitions: Epson Tour, Outlaw Tour
- Website: www.thecactustour.com

The Cactus Tour is an unofficial developmental golf tour, or mini-tour, for women golfers which operates in the American Southwest. It bills itself as "The Tour for Women Golf Professionals in the Western United States!". Golfweek termed it " an Arizona-based mini-tour for up-and-coming women’s professionals." The Cactus Tour made news in 2020 as one of the few professional sports leagues to operate without interruption during the COVID-19 pandemic.

== Description ==
It has lower entry requirements, and lower prizes, than the LPGA Tour, the U.S.-based professional women's golf tour, and the Epson Tour, formerly the "Futures Tour" and then the "Symetra Tour", which in 1999 became the official development tour for the LPGA. There are no connections like the automatic qualifying for the LPGA Tour by those finishing high on the Epson Tour's money list for a season.

Tour membership is open to professional and amateur women golfers. Minimum age for participation is 12, lower than the age 17 requirement for the Epson Tour.

The tour is operated by Mike Brown. Around 2010, Brown "purchased the rights to the Cactus Tour and [around 2019 was] staging about 30 events a year at desert locales in Arizona, California and Nevada."

In 2022, the entry fees are $595 for pros and $295 for amateurs (with discount taken at checkout).

In 2019, prize purses ranged from a high $28,515 purse and a first prize of $4,000, down to the lowest purse of $2,700 with first prize $1,800. In 2020, purses were "decidedly mini—usually $2,000 to $3,000 to the winner of a 54-hole tournament, with about half the players in pro field getting at least their $577 entry fee back."

The Outlaw Tour, also in the Phoenix area, is the equivalent tour for men golfers.

== History ==
The Cactus Tour was "founded in 2005 for women professionals with the charter 'to present a competitive environment, as well as an affordable one, for women golf professionals to use in developing or re-developing their game in preparation for competing on the Symetra [now the Epson] and LPGA tours. Elite amateur women players are also invited to play for the experience and exposure to professional play.'"

Unlike the LPGA and Epson Tours, the Cactus Tour played on without interruption from the COVID-19 pandemic in 2020. Its scheduled events continued, although a number of COVID prevention policies were put in place. There was praise and criticism for this. In fact the tour added events, and the year ended with the Cactus Tour having held 38 events, in contrast to the Epson Tour having held 10 before it shut down.

In December 2020, after the tour concluded, the Longbow Golf Club and its general manager Bob McNichols organized a winner-take-all exhibition event, in which four of the Cactus Tour's top money winners of the year competed for a $10,000 prize. The club put up the prize; the four would play a single round of 18 holes and the low scorer would take the prize. Brittany Yada, Haley Moore, Mina Harigae, and Savannah Vilaubi competed, and it was won by Haley Moore. 2020 was the fourth year that Longbow Golf Club had participated in the tour, hosting one or more tour events.

In 2021, Longbow Golf Club hosted a second Longbow Cactus Cup Championship, again a single-round season-ending exhibition. The Cactus Tour's top money winners who competed for a $10,000 prize were: Kendra Dalton, who finished first in 2021 tour winnings, Nishtha Madan (second), Gabriella Then (fourth), and Elizabeth Wang] (fifth). Spectators were invited to attend, free. Elizabeth Wang was the winner.

== Players ==
LPGA professional players sometimes play in the Cactus Tour, as did Anna Nordqvist of Sweden, already a two-time LPGA winner, when she played in and won the last 2020 Cactus Tour event (at Moon Valley in the Phoenix, Arizona area).

During the LPGA's suspension of play in mid-2020, LPGA veteran Mina Harigae "stunned" the Cactus Tour, winning four out of six events she competed in, and winning two in a row by 14 strokes or more.

Cactus Tour graduates include:

- Gabriella Then, who won her first professional events on the Cactus Tour and the WAPT Tour, and went on to win the 2022 Garden City Charity Classic at Buffalo Dunes, her first Epson Tour title.
- Haley Moore, who turned professional and won two Cactus Tour titles in 2019, then in November at Q-Series won her LPGA Tour card for the 2020 season.
- Ryu So-yeon, who turned professional in 2007 at age 17, had her first pro win on the Cactus Tour, and has gone on to win two LPGA major championships in 2011 and 2017.
