= AJGA Tournament of Champions =

Amateur golf tournament in the United States

Tournament information
- Location: San Antonio, Texas, U.S.
- Established: 1978
- Course: TPC San Antonio
- Par: 72
- Organized by: American Junior Golf Association (AJGA)
- Format: Stroke play
- Month played: November

Current champion
- (United States) Luke Ringkamp (United States) Nikki Oh

The AJGA Tournament of Champions, known currently as the Rolex Tournament of Champions for sponsorship reasons, is a leading annual junior golf tournament in the United States for amateur golfers under the age of 19.

== Format ==
The tournament is the flagship tournament of the American Junior Golf Association. The field is made up of the top boys and girls on the AJGA Rankings, AJGA Junior All-Americans, award recipients, plus select invitees. The 44th edition in 2001 featured 144 of the best junior golfers in the world from 14 different countries.

== History ==
The tournament has been played since 1978 and many winners have later gone on to success on the PGA Tour or the LPGA Tour and even win majors, such as Phil Mickelson, David Duval, Webb Simpson, Jenny Lidback, Grace Park, Patty Tavatanakit, Inbee Park, Morgan Pressel and Ashleigh Simon. When Phil Mickelson won his third consecutive title in 1988, he became the first player in AJGA Boys Division history to win the same event in three consecutive years.

Other repeat winners include Tommy Moore, James Oh, Beth Bauer, Meja Örtengren and Rose Zhang.

== Winners ==
Year	Boys winner	Girls winner	Venue	Location
Rolex Tournament of Champions
2025	(United States) Luke Ringkamp	(United States) Nikki Oh	TPC San Antonio	Texas
2024	(United States) Miles Russell	(United States) Amelie Zalsman	TPC San Antonio	Texas
2023	(United States) Tyler Mawhinney	(Canada) Aphrodite Deng	TPC San Antonio	Texas
2022	(United States) Jackson Koivun	(Sweden) Meja Örtengren (2)	TPC San Antonio	Texas
2021	(United States) Eric Lee (Note: 2021: Eric Lee defeated Jackson Koivun on the first hole of a sudden-death playoff)	(Sweden) Meja Örtengren	PGA National Resort & Spa	Florida
2020	(United States) David Ford	(United States) Rose Zhang (2)	PGA National Resort & Spa	Florida
2019	(United States) Kelly Chinn	(United States) Rose Zhang	PGA National Resort & Spa	Florida
2018	(United States) Akshay Bhatia	(United States) Amanda Sambach	PGA National Resort & Spa	Florida
2017	(United States) Garrett Barber	(United States) Lucy Li	PGA National Resort & Spa	Florida
2016	(United States) Davis Shore	(Thailand) Patty Tavatanakit	Reynolds Lake Oconee	Georgia
2015	(United States) Phillip Barbaree	(United States) Hannah O'Sullivan	Sunriver Resort	Oregon
2014	(United States) Sam Burns	(United States) Andrea Lee (2)	Richland Country Club	Tennessee
2013	(United States) Benjamin Griffin	(United States) Alison Lee	Lancaster Country Club	Pennsylvania
2012	(United States) Matthew NeSmith	(United States) Jaye Marie Green (Note: 2012: Jaye Marie Green defeated Karen Chung on the first hole of a sudden-death playoff)	Capital City Club	Georgia
2011	(Hong Kong) Hak Shunyat	(United States) Gabriella Then (Note: 2011: Gabriella Then defeated Ariya Jutanugarn of Thailand, on the first hole of a sudden-death playoff)	The Club at Bella Collina	Florida
2010	(United States) Anthony Paolucci	(United States) Kristen Park	Blessings Golf Club	Arkansas
2009	(United States) T.J. Vogel (Note: 2009: T.J. Vogel defeated An Byeong-hun and Gavin Hall on the second hole of a sudden-death playoff)	(United States) Victoria Tanco	Dalhousie Golf Club	Missouri
2008	(United States) Cory Whitsett	(United States) Jennifer Johnson	Victoria National Golf Club	Indiana
2007	(United States) Sihwan Kim	(United States) Courtney Ellenbogen	Ohio State University Golf Club	Ohio
2006	(United States) Philip Francis	(South Africa) Ashleigh Simon	Hiwan Golf Club	Colorado
2005	(United States) Jordan Cox	(United States) Esther Choe	Long Cove Club	South Carolina
2004	(United States) Jamie Lovemark	(United States) Morgan Pressel	Sunriver Resort	Oregon
2003	(United States) Brendon Todd	(South Korea) Inbee Park	Chateau Elan Resort	Georgia
2002	(United States) Randy Lowry	(United States) Erica Blasberg	The Desert Mountain Club	Arizona
2001	(United States) Webb Simpson	(United States) Lisa Ferrero	Westin Innisbrook Resort	Florida
2000	(United States) James Oh (2)	(United States) Mallory Code	Serrano Country Club	California
1999	(United States) James Oh	(Thailand) Naree Wongluekiet	Ohio State University Golf Club	Ohio
1998	(United States) John Lepak (Note: 1998: John Lepak defeated Brody Stockton and Kris Mikkelsen on the fourth hole of a sudden-death playoff)	(Spain) Paula Martí (Note: 1998: Paula Martí defeated Angela Jerman and Virada Nirapathpongporn of Thailand, on the second hole of a sudden-death playoff)	Coto de Caza Golf & Racquet Club	California
1997	(United States) David Gossett	(South Korea) Yang Young-a	Long Cove Club & Wexford Golf Club	South Carolina
AJGA Tournament of Champions
1996	(United States) Charles Howell III	(United States) Grace Park	The Desert Mountain Club	Arizona
1995	(Japan) Ryuji Imada	(United States) Beth Bauer (2)	Innisbrook Hilton Resort	Florida
1994	(United States) Robert Floyd	(United States) Beth Bauer	Oak Tree Country Club	Oklahoma
1993	(Venezuela) Gilberto Morales	(United States) Kellee Booth (2)	Horseshoe Bend Country Club	Georgia
1992	(United States) Patrick Vadden	(United States) Emilee Klein	Horseshoe Bend Country Club	Georgia
1991	(United States) Chris Edgmon	(United States) Heather Bowie	Oak Tree Country Club	Oklahoma
1990	(United States) Harrison Frazar	(United States) Kellee Booth	Innisbrook Resort	Florida
1989	(United States) David Duval	(United States) Leta Lindley	Palm Beach Polo & Country Club	Florida
1988	(United States) Phil Mickelson (3)	(Italy) Stefania Croce	Horseshoe Bend Country Club	Georgia
1987	(United States) Phil Mickelson (2)	(United States) Christy Erb	Horseshoe Bend Country Club	Georgia
1986	(United States) Phil Mickelson	(United States) Amy Fruhwirth	Horseshoe Bend Country Club	Georgia
1985	(United States) Dudley Hart	(United States) Katie Peterson	Horseshoe Bend Country Club	Georgia
1984	(United States) Bob May	(United States) Page Dunlap	Horseshoe Bend Country Club	Georgia
1983	(United States) Brian Nelson	(United States) Kris Tschetter	Horseshoe Bend Country Club	Georgia
1982	(United States) Louis Brown	(United States) Heather Farr	Inverrary Golf Club	Florida
1981	(United States) Tommy Moore (2)	(Peru) Jenny Lidback	Inverrary Golf Club	Florida
1980	(United States) Tommy Moore	(United States) Jody Rosenthal	Inverrary Golf Club	Florida
1979	(United States) Andy Dillard	(United States) Amy Benz	Inverrary Golf Club	Florida
1978	(United States) Willie Wood	(United States) Denise Hermida (Note: 1978: Denise Hermida defeated Cathy Hanlon in a sudden-death playoff)	Inverrary Golf Club	Florida
