= James Oh =

American professional golfer (born 1982)

Personal information
- Nationality: United States
- Born: April 5, 1982 (age 44) Los Angeles, California, U.S.
- Height: 5 ft 8 in (1.73 m)
- Weight: 160 lb (73 kg; 11 st)

Career
- Sport: Golf
- College: University of Nevada, Las Vegas
- Turned professional: 2001
- Professional wins: 1

Number of wins by tour
- Korn Ferry Tour: 1

James Oh (born April 5, 1982) is an American professional golfer.

== Early life and amateur career ==
In 1982, Oh was born in Los Angeles, California. In 1996, he became the youngest golfer to qualify for the U.S. Amateur at age 14 years, 4 months, 20 days, one month younger than Bobby Jones in 1916. His record was broken by Joseph Bramlett in 2002. Oh won the 1998 U.S. Junior Amateur defeating Aaron Baddeley in the finals. Oh and Phil Mickelson are the only multiple winners of the Rolex Tournament of Champions in American Junior Golf Association history.

Oh played college golf at the University of Nevada, Las Vegas for one year before turning professional in 2001.

== Professional career ==
In 2003, Oh Monday-qualified and went on to win the Mark Christopher Charity Classic on the Nationwide Tour. At age 21 years, 5 months and 27 days, he became the youngest winner on the Nationwide Tour. Jason Day broke Oh's record in 2007. Oh played the Nationwide Tour from 2003 to 2006. He played on the PGA Tour in 2009 after earning his card in Q School. His best finish was T-39 at the AT&T Pebble Beach National Pro-Am.

Oh is currently a golf instructor in his hometown of Lakewood, California. His clientele consists of some of the best juniors and amateurs in the world as well as PGA Tour, LPGA Tour, and Korn Ferry Tour professionals.

== Amateur wins ==
- 1998 U.S. Junior Amateur
- 1999 Rolex Tournament of Champions
- 2000 Rolex Tournament of Champions

== Professional wins (1) ==
=== Nationwide Tour wins (1) ===
No.	Date	Tournament	Winning score	Margin of victory	Runner-up
1	Sep 28, 2003	Mark Christopher Charity Classic	−16 (65-66-66-71=268)	Playoff	(United States) Jess Daley

Nationwide Tour playoff record (1–0)

No.	Year	Tournament	Opponent	Result
1	2003	Mark Christopher Charity Classic	(United States) Jess Daley	Won with birdie on third extra hole

== See also ==
- 2008 PGA Tour Qualifying School graduates
