= Haley Moore =

American professional golfer (born 1998)

Personal information
- Full name: Haley Nicole Moore
- Nationality: United States
- Born: November 24, 1998 (age 27) Crystal Lake, Illinois, U.S.
- Height: 5 ft 11 3/4 in

Career
- Sport: Golf
- College: University of Arizona
- Turned professional: 2019
- Current tour: LPGA Tour
- Former tours: Symetra Tour; Cactus Tour
- Professional wins: 3

Best results in LPGA major championships
- Chevron Championship: T67: 2015
- Women's PGA C'ship: CUT: 2020, 2021
- U.S. Women's Open: CUT: 2021
- Women's British Open: CUT: 2020
- Evian Championship: DNP

Haley Nicole Moore (born November 24, 1998) is an American professional golfer.

== Early life and junior golf ==
Moore was born in Crystal Lake, Illinois and attended San Pasqual High School in Escondido, California where she was a member of the golf team. She graduated in June 2016.

Moore qualified for the 2015 ANA Inspiration by winning the ANA Inspiration Champions Junior Challenge. She was the only amateur to make the cut and finished tied for 67th place.

== College golf ==
As a junior, Moore won the deciding match in the 2018 NCAA Women's Golf Championship, to give Arizona the title over the University of Alabama.

After her junior and senior seasons at University of Arizona, Moore attained the position of #21 on the World Amateur Golf Rankings. As a result, she was invited by The Board of Governors of Augusta National Golf Club to participate in the inaugural Augusta National Women's Amateur as one of the top-30 ranked amateurs in the world. The first two rounds were held at nearby Champions Retreat in Augusta, Georgia. The field was cut to the low 30 players with the final round being held at Augusta National. By virtue of her scores of 71-73 in the first two rounds, Moore qualified for that final round. In her final round, she made par on her first 15 holes. She shot 71-73-72=216 for the event and finish in a tie for 7th place. Moore said, "I was just grateful and blessed to be out there, just knowing that Augusta was really strictly only open to men at one point. And for them to now have women be able to go out there and play, and the top amateurs out there it was just amazing. I just enjoyed the experience while I was there."

== Professional career ==
Upon graduation from the University of Arizona in May 2019, Moore turned professional in June 2019. She played on the Cactus Tour, winning twice.

Moore competed in the California State Women's Open contested at Omni La Costa Resort & Spa in Carlsbad, California, in July 2019. Moore posted a career low round of 64. She then followed it up on the second day with a 73 to post a 3 shot victory and her second professional title.

In August 2019, Moore began her quest to become a full time member of the LPGA Tour by competing in Qualifying school.

On November 2, 2019 Moore earned her LPGA Tour card for the 2020 season at Q-Series in Pinehurst, North Carolina, finishing in 11th place.

== Amateur wins ==
- 2011 Omni Tucson National 13-18
- 2012 Las Vegas Junior Girls
- 2014 ClubCorp Mission Hills Desert Junior
- 2017 Allstate Sugar Bowl Intercollegiate, Golfweek Conference Challenge
- 2018 Hawkeye El Tigre Invitational

== Professional wins ==
=== Cactus Tour wins ===
- 2019 Cactus Tour @ Stallion Mountain, Cactus Tour @ Morongo

=== Other wins ===
- 2019 California State Women's Open

== Team appearances ==
Amateur

- Junior Solheim Cup (representing the United States): 2015 (winners)
