= Jalapeno Golf Classic =

The Jalapeno Golf Classic was an annual golf tournament for professional women golfers on the Futures Tour, the LPGA Tour's developmental tour. The event was part of the Futures Tour's schedule from 2005 to 2008. It took place at Palm View Golf Course in McAllen, Texas.

The tournament was a 54-hole event, as are most Futures Tour tournaments, and included pre-tournament pro-am opportunities, in which local amateur golfers can play with the professional golfers from the Tour as a benefit for local charities. The benefiting charity for the Jalapeno Golf Classic was the McAllen Hispanic Chamber of Commerce.

At the 2008 tournament, 17-year-old Vicky Hurst broke the Futures Tour's 54-hole scoring record, shooting an 18-under-par 198. The record had previously been held by Grace Park, who shot 16-under at a tournament in 1999.

== Winners ==
Year	Dates	Champion	Country	Score	Purse ($)	Winner's share ($)
2008	Apr 25–27	Vicky Hurst	United States	198 (−18)	85,000	11,900
2007	Apr 27–29	Emily Bastel	United States	210 (−6)	75,000	10,500
2006	Apr 28–30	Kristy McPherson	United States	205 (−11)	70,000	9,800
2005	Apr 22–24	Virada Nirapathpongporn	Thailand	204 (−12)	70,000	9,800

== Tournament records ==
Year	Player	Score	Round
2007	Kim Augusta	64 (−8)	2nd
2008	Vikki Lang	64 (−8)	3rd
2008	Vicky Hurst	64 (−8)	3rd
