= Blue Ribbon Open =

Professional golf tournament

Coordinates: 43.151°N 88.077°W

Tournament information
- Location: Menomenee Falls, Wisconsin, U.S.
- Established: 1951
- Course: North Hills Country Club
- Par: 71
- Length: 6,257 yards (5,721 m)
- Tour: PGA Tour
- Format: Stroke play
- Prize fund: $20,000
- Month played: July
- Final year: 1951

Final champion
- (Australia) Joe Kirkwood Jr., 271 (–13)

Location in the United States
Location in Wisconsin

The Blue Ribbon Open was a professional golf tournament on the PGA Tour, played only in 1951. It was held in Wisconsin at the North Hills Country Club in Menomonee Falls, northwest of Milwaukee.

Part-time Hollywood actor Joe Kirkwood Jr. won the event at 271 (–13), two shots over runners-up Sam Snead and Jim Ferrier, the 54-hole leader. The purse was $20,000 with a winner's share of $2,750. Kirkwood equaled the course record in the final round with a seven-under 64. He had won on tour three years earlier at the Philadelphia Inquirer Open. Following the win, Kirkwood left to go fishing in northern Wisconsin.

North Hills was the site of the Milwaukee Open in 1940 and later hosted the Milwaukee Open Invitational in 1960 and 1961.

== Leaderboard ==
Sunday, July 22, 1951

Place	Player	Country	Score	To par	Money ($)
1	Joe Kirkwood Jr.	Australia	72-66-69-64=271	−13	2,750
2	Sam Snead	United States	67-70-70-65=273	−11	1,900
T3	Jim Ferrier	Australia	70-68-68-68=274	−10	1,475
T3	Lloyd Mangrum	United States	71-67-70-66=274	−10	1,475
5	Skee Riegel	United States	73-66-68-68=275	−9	1,150
6	Jimmy Demaret	United States	68-69-70-72=279	−5	1,000
T7	Julius Boros	United States	69-68-72-71=280	−4	762
T7	Jack Burke Jr.	United States	73-68-68-71=280	−4	762
T7	George Fazio	United States	68-70-72-70=280	−4	762
T7	Glenn Teal	United States	67-67-74-72=280	−4	762

== See also ==
Other former PGA Tour events in Milwaukee

- Milwaukee Open, 1940
- Milwaukee Open Invitational, 1955–61
- Greater Milwaukee Open, 1968–2009
