= Milwaukee Open =

Golf tournament formerly on the PGA Tour

Coordinates: 43.151°N 88.077°W

Tournament information
- Location: Menomenee Falls, Wisconsin, U.S.
- Established: 1940
- Course: North Hills Country Club
- Par: 71
- Length: 6,427 yards (5,877 m)
- Tour: PGA Tour
- Format: Stroke play
- Prize fund: $5,000
- Month played: August
- Final year: 1940

Final champion
- (United States) Ralph Guldahl, 268 (−16)

Location in the United States
Location in Wisconsin

The Milwaukee Open was a professional golf tournament in Wisconsin on the PGA Tour, played only in 1940. It was held August 2–4 at North Hills Country Club in Menomenee Falls, northwest of Milwaukee. Three-time major winner Ralph Guldahl shot a final round 67 (−4) to win the event at 268 (−16), two shots ahead of runner-up Ed Oliver. It was his first victory in sixteen months, since the Masters in 1939. The purse was $5,000 with a winner's share of $1,200.

Johnny Bulla led after 54 holes at 197 (−16), a new scoring record for the tour. Playing with Guldahl, he carded a 75 (+4) in the final round and fell into a tie for fourth, four strokes back. With nine holes remaining, Bulla led Guldahl by three strokes, but then shot 39 (+3) while Guldahl made up seven strokes with 32 (−4).

The 72-hole event began on Friday, and the final two rounds were played on Sunday. North Hills later hosted the Blue Ribbon Open (1951) and the final two editions of the Milwaukee Open Invitational (1960, 1961).

== Leaderboard ==
Sunday, August 4, 1940

Place	Player	Country	Score	To par	Money ($)
1	Ralph Guldahl	United States	68-67-66-67=268	−16	1,200
2	Ed Oliver	United States	66-66-70-68=270	−14	750
3	Sam Snead	United States	69-68-69-65=271	−13	550
T4	Johnny Bulla	United States	66-65-66-75=272	−12	375
T4	Ben Hogan	United States	70-68-66-68=272	−12	375

=== Scorecard ===
Final nine holes

Hole	10	11	12	13	14	15	16	17	18
Par	4	3	4	5	4	4	3	4	5
(United States) Guldahl	−13	−13	−13	−14	−14	−15	−15	−15	−16
(United States) Bulla	−15	−15	−14	−14	−13	−14	−14	−13	−12

Cumulative tournament scores, relative to par

== See also ==
Other former PGA Tour events in Milwaukee

- Blue Ribbon Open, 1951
- Milwaukee Open Invitational, 1955–61
- Greater Milwaukee Open, 1968–2009
