= Milwaukee Open Invitational =

Golf tournament formerly on the PGA Tour

Tournament information
- Location: Milwaukee, Wisconsin
- Established: 1955
- Course: North Hills Country Club
- Par: 70
- Length: 6,410 yards (5,860 m)
- Tour: PGA Tour
- Format: Stroke play
- Prize fund: US$30,000
- Month played: July
- Final year: 1961

Tournament record score
- Aggregate: 264 Cary Middlecoff (1958)
- To par: –16 as above

Final champion
- (Australia) Bruce Crampton
- Location in the United States Location in Wisconsin

The Milwaukee Open Invitational was a professional golf tournament in Wisconsin on the PGA Tour. It was played seven times from 1955 through 1961 at different courses in the Milwaukee area.

During its final year, Arnold Palmer skipped the tournament to prepare for the British Open, which he won. The field at North Hills Country Club in Menomonee Falls did include 21-year-old Jack Nicklaus of Ohio State, already a veteran of eight majors and the reigning NCAA champion, he won his second U.S. Amateur a month later. The purse was $30,000 and Bruce Crampton won by a stroke; his winner's share was $4,300. Nicklaus was three strokes back at 275 (−5), tied for sixth.

Two won the event twice, both at different courses: Cary Middlecoff (1955, 1958) and Ken Venturi (1957, 1960).

Miller Brewing Company was the title sponsor for the first five editions; the tournament was initiated in 1955 with a five-year agreement, part of the company's centennial celebration.

== Venues ==
The tournament was played at three courses in the Milwaukee area:

Venue	City	Events	Years	Coordinates
Blue Mound Country Club	Wauwatosa	1	1955	43.068°N 88.041°W
Tripoli Country Club	Milwaukee	4	1956–1959	43.153°N 87.967°W
North Hills Country Club	Menomonee Falls	2	1960–1961	43.151°N 88.077°W

Blue Mound hosted the PGA Championship in 1933. The PGA Tour returned in 1968 with the Greater Milwaukee Open, which was played for 42 years, through 2009; it was played twice at Tripoli (1971, 1972).

== Winners ==
Year	Winner	Score	To par	Margin of victory	Runner(s)-up
Milwaukee Open Invitational
1961	(Australia) Bruce Crampton	272	−8	1 stroke	(United States) Gay Brewer (United States) Bob Goalby
1960	(United States) Ken Venturi (2)	271	−9	2 strokes	(United States) Billy Casper
Miller Open Invitational
1959	(United States) Gene Littler	265	−15	1 stroke	(United States) Bob Rosburg (United States) Bo Wininger
1958	(United States) Cary Middlecoff (2)	264	−16	2 strokes	(United States) Bob Rosburg
Miller High Life Open
1957	(United States) Ken Venturi	267	−13	5 strokes	(Canada) Al Balding (United States) Sam Snead
1956	(United States) Ed Furgol	265	−15	4 strokes	(United States) Gene Littler
1955	(United States) Cary Middlecoff	265	−15	4 strokes	(United States) Julius Boros (United States) Ted Kroll (United States) Mike Souchak

== See also ==
Other former PGA Tour events in Milwaukee

- Greater Milwaukee Open, 1968–2009
- Blue Ribbon Open, 1951
- Milwaukee Open, 1940
