= Self Regional Healthcare =

Acute care hospital in Greenwood, SC

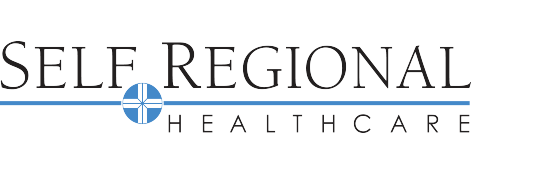

Geography
- Location: 1325 Spring Street, Greenwood, South Carolina, United States
- Coordinates: 34.17572°N 82.15646°W

Organization
- Care system: Public
- Affiliated university: none

Services
- Emergency department: Level III trauma center
- Beds: 358

Helipads
- Helipad: Yes

History
- Former name: Self Memorial Hospital
- Founded: November 1, 1951

Links
- Website: www.selfregional.org
- Lists: Hospitals in South Carolina

Self Regional Healthcare, previously Self Memorial Hospital, is a 358-bed short-term acute care hospital founded on November 1, 1951 in Greenwood, South Carolina. The hospital was founded by the Self Family Foundation, an organization created James Cuthbert Self, founder of the local Greenwood Mills, for that purpose. Of the 322 beds, 30 are ICU beds and 32 are emergency medical service beds. The healthcare system serves a seven-county region.

== Events ==
In 2015, Self Regional Healthcare received a grant from Susan G. Komen Mountains to Midlands to provide uninsured women with diagnostic testing for breast cancer.

In June 2017 a jury awarded $1 million in a malpractice suit against Self Regional Healthcare and physician Mark Robirds.

In September 2017, Self announced it would lease Edgefield County Hospital’s facilities and equipment and manage the site as part of its own system. This would add 25 beds to the system.

In 2018, it became the first hospital in South Carolina to be verified by the American College of Surgeons as a Level 3 Trauma Center.

In June 2022, Self Regional announced plans to affiliate with Abbeville Area Medical Center. The integration process is expected to be completed during mid 2023. The process was completed in October 2023.

In June 2024, Self Regional unveiled it’s helipad and also it’s partnership with Med-Trans Corp. The hospital announced their medical transport air service with Med-Trans June 20. Allowing the hospital to provide swift and efficient care for the community. The air ambulance provided by Med-Trans Corp. is a medically configured Bell 407 helicopter that is stationed on the helipad at the rear of the patient tower. It is also adjacent towards the emergency care center.

== See also ==
- Self Regional Healthcare Foundation Women's Health Classic
