= Brooke Henderson =

Canadian professional golfer (born 1997)

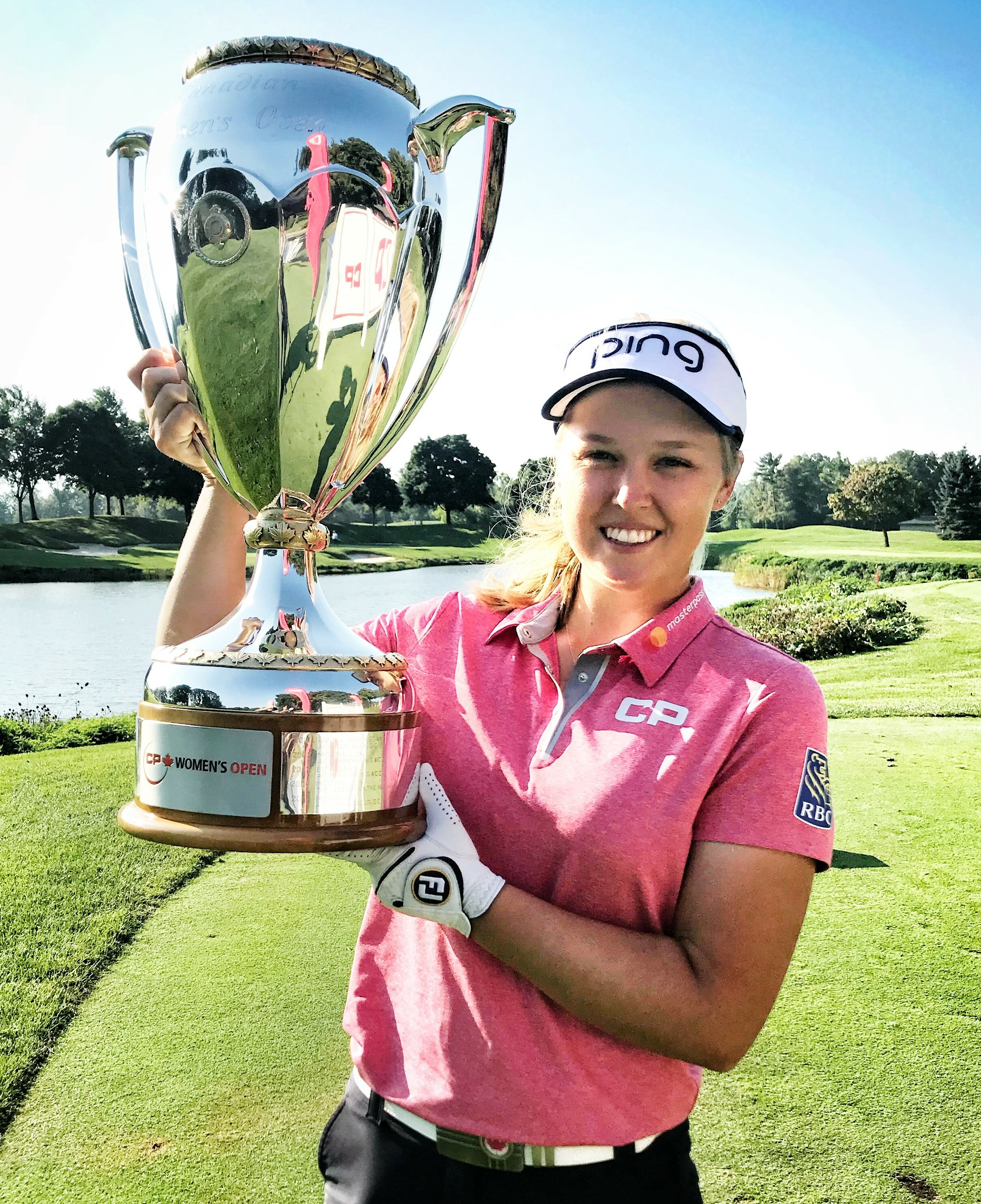
- Henderson at the 2018 Canadian Open

Personal information
- Full name: Brooke Mackenzie Henderson
- Nationality: Canada
- Born: 10 September 1997 (age 29) Smiths Falls, Ontario, Canada
- Height: 5 ft 4 in (163 cm)

Career
- Sport: Golf
- Turned professional: 2014
- Current tour: LPGA Tour
- Professional wins: 20

Number of wins by tour
- LPGA Tour: 14
- Ladies European Tour: 1
- Epson Tour: 1
- Other: 6

Best results in LPGA major championships (wins: 2)
- Chevron Championship: T2: 2020
- Women's PGA C'ship: Won: 2016
- U.S. Women's Open: T5: 2015
- Women's British Open: T7: 2022
- Evian Championship: Won: 2022

Achievements and awards
- (For a full list of awards, see here)

Brooke Mackenzie Henderson (born 10 September 1997) is a Canadian professional golfer on the LPGA Tour.

Henderson was named the Canadian Press female athlete of the year for 2015, 2017 and 2018. She won her first major at age 18 in 2016 at the KPMG Women's PGA Championship, becoming the event's youngest winner. With 14 LPGA wins as of August 2025, Henderson has the most victories of any Canadian golfer on major professional tours. She won her second career major title at the 2022 Evian Championship. Henderson won the Canadian Women's Open, her home championship, in both 2018 and 2025.

In November 2019, she was named the winner of the 2019 Founders Award by a vote of fellow golfers on the LPGA Tour as someone "whose behaviour and deeds best exemplify the spirit, ideals, and values of the LPGA."

== Early years, family and education ==
Henderson was raised in Smiths Falls, Ontario and initially learned golf at the Rideau Lakes Golf and Country Club. Her parents are Dave and Darlene. Henderson's sister, Brittany – older by seven years and a former professional player – was a role model for Henderson to play golf competitively. Henderson attended the Smiths Falls District Collegiate Institute through 2014.

Henderson won the Canadian Women's Amateur in 2013, and finished runner-up at the 2014 U.S. Women's Amateur. While still an amateur, she won three events on the CN Canadian Women's Tour, and finished tied for 10th place in the U.S. Women's Open at age 16. She won numerous amateur tournaments and was the top-ranked female amateur golfer in the world before turning professional in December 2014, passing up the chance to play college golf at the University of Florida.

Throughout her professional career, Henderson's father has been her coach and her sister has been her caddy.

== Development and sponsorships ==
Henderson has signed several corporate sponsorships, including IMG to manage her professional affairs, Royal Bank of Canada for banking and financial services, Sunice Golf for golf apparel and outerwear, and Skechers Performance for Go Golf footwear. She is an ambassador for UKG, a technology and workforce management company.

Henderson has other sponsorship deals with Canadian Pacific, MasterCard, Rolex, BMW, BioSteel, and Golf Town.

To begin the 2023 season, Henderson signed a multiyear sponsorship with TaylorMade for her golf clubs, bag, and balls. In 2024, she began a sponsorship with T-Mobile, and entered a multiyear partnership with the Ottawa Senators of the National Hockey League in which she will display the Senators logo on her water bottles and golf towels.

Beginning in 2017, Henderson is a resident touring professional at Miromar Lakes Beach and Golf Club in Miromar Lakes, Florida.

== Professional career ==
=== 2015 ===
Henderson set a tournament record with her 36-hole score at the LPGA Tour's Swinging Skirts LPGA Classic in April 2015, at the Lake Merced Golf Club, just south of San Francisco. Her second round 65 (−7) gave her 135 (−9), breaking the record set by Stacy Lewis in 2014 by three shots. She finished third, one stroke behind Lydia Ko, the playoff winner, and runner-up Morgan Pressel.

At age 17, Henderson had to play her way into LPGA Tour events through Monday qualifiers, and to rely on sponsor exemptions, after her request for an age waiver to compete at the LPGA Tour Q School in late 2014 was denied. She earned a Symetra Tour card after winning her first event as a professional, the Four Winds Invitational in Indiana in June 2015. With a final round 66 (−4), Henderson tied for fifth at the U.S. Women's Open in July.

After Monday-qualifying for the Cambia Portland Classic in Oregon in August, Henderson won the event by eight shots, the largest victory margin on tour since 2012, and became the tour's third-youngest winner. She was only the second Monday qualifier to win on tour, and the first since Laurel Kean in 2000. Henderson was also the first Canadian to win on the LPGA Tour since Lorie Kane in 2001, and was granted immediate LPGA Tour membership.

=== 2016 ===
In June 2016, Henderson won her first major championship, at the KPMG Women's PGA Championship at Sahalee Country Club near Seattle. Her final round 65 (−6) propelled her into a tie with top-ranked Lydia Ko, followed by a playoff which Henderson won with a birdie on the first hole. At age 18, she became the youngest to win that major, the second-youngest in any women's major, and the first Canadian woman to win a major in 48 years. It was Henderson's second tour win, both in the Pacific Northwest, and her first as a tour member; it moved her from fourth to second in the world rankings.

Before the 2024 Women's PGA Championship at Sahalee Country Club, the club provided Henderson with an honorary membership and a commemorative plaque at the spot in the 18th fairway where she hit a 7 iron close to the hole to win the 2016 event.

With her win as defending champion at the Cambia Portland Classic in June 2016, Henderson joined Sandra Post and Lorie Kane as the only Canadians to win multiple LPGA events in the same season.

Henderson was a member of the Canadian Olympic Team for the 2016 Summer Olympics in Rio de Janeiro in the women's Olympic golf tournament, placing seventh.

=== 2017 ===
In June 2017, Henderson won the Meijer LPGA Classic. Her win on 2 October 2017 at the McKayson New Zealand Women's Open was her first LPGA championship outside North America.

=== 2018 ===
On 14 April, Henderson won the Lotte Championship, her sixth victory on the LPGA Tour finishing at −12 to win by four strokes over Azahara Muñoz.

On 26 August, Henderson became the first Canadian in 45 years – after Jocelyne Bourassa in 1973 – to win the Canadian Women's Open at the Wascana Country Club in Regina, Saskatchewan.

By finishing second (to Ariya Jutanugarn) in the 2018 season-ending Race to the CME Globe, Henderson was awarded $150,000 from the bonus pool purse. She was awarded the Bobbie Rosenfeld Award in December 2018 as The Canadian Press Female Athlete of the Year for the third time.

=== 2019 ===
On 20 April 2019, Henderson defended her title at the Lotte Championship in Hawaii. This marked her eighth victory on the LPGA Tour, tying Sandra Post, Mike Weir and George Knudson for the most victories by a Canadian golfer on the LPGA or PGA Tours.

On 16 June 2019, Henderson won the Meijer LPGA Classic in Michigan for the second time – the third LPGA event where she has multiple victories. This was her ninth victory on the LPGA, giving her the most victories on major tours of any professional golfer in Canadian history.

=== 2021 ===
Henderson won the Hugel-Air Premia LA Open on 24 April 2021 for her tenth LPGA Tour victory.

=== 2022 ===
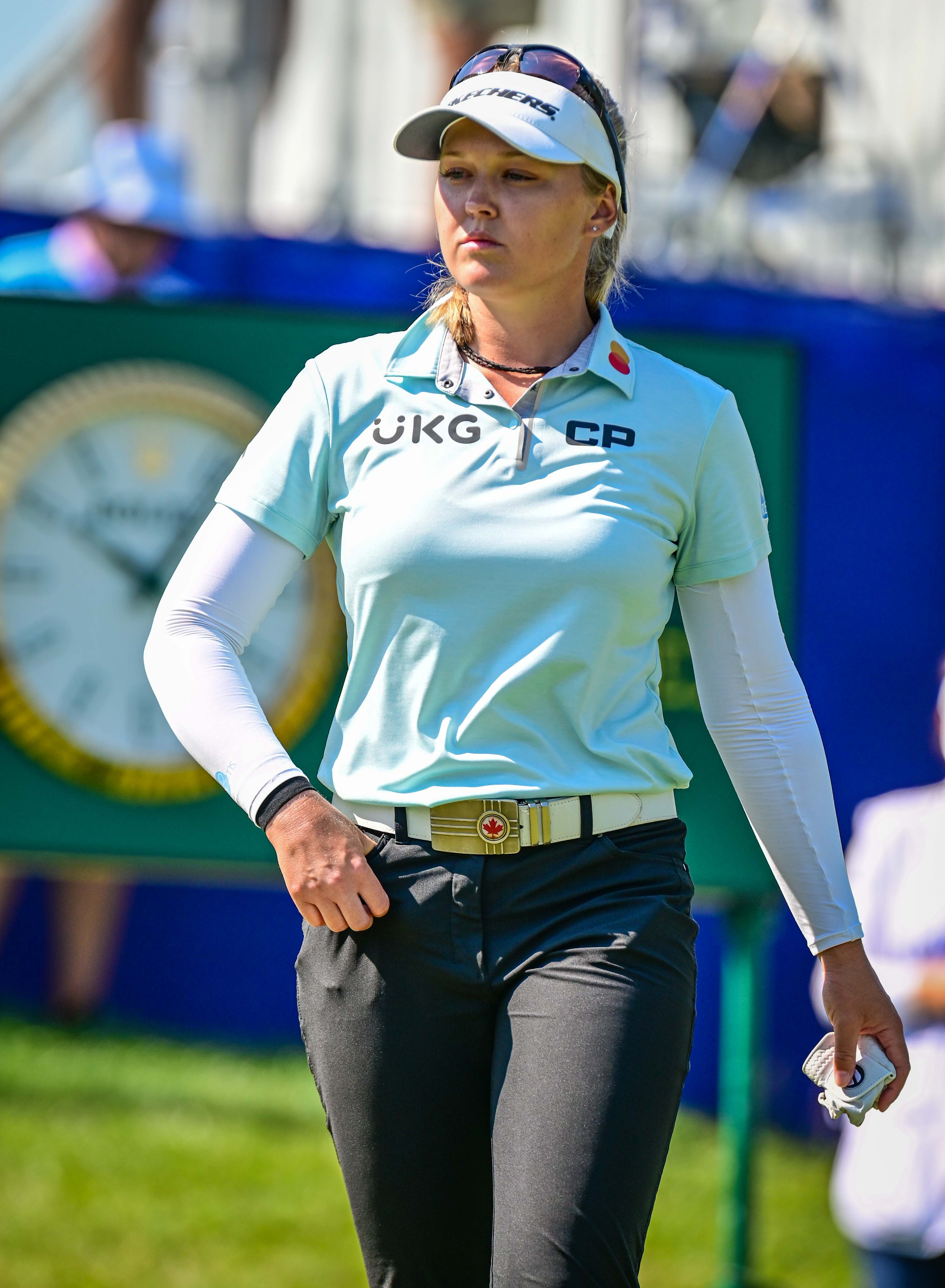
Brooke Henderson at the 2022 Women's PGA Championship

Henderson increased her LPGA victory total to 11 with her win at the ShopRite LPGA Classic in a playoff over Lindsey Weaver-Wright on 12 June 2022.

Henderson won her second career major at the 2022 Evian Championship, in which she was the first player in LPGA history to begin a major with two rounds of 64 or lower.

On 12 November, the day after shooting a first round, one-over-par 71 at the Pelican Women's Championship, she wrote in a statement that she had to withdraw, "due to an injury in my upper back, it was recommended that I rest as much as possible coming into the week. While I plan to address any medical concerns and recover fully in the off season, I am trying to do everything I can to compete this week. I appreciate all of the support."

=== 2023 ===
On 22 January, Henderson won the 2023 Hilton Grand Vacations Tournament of Champions at Lake Nona Golf & Country Club in Orlando, completing all four rounds in the lead, and achieving her 13th victory on the LPGA Tour.

In July, Henderson finished second to Céline Boutier at the 2023 Evian Championship, the season's fourth major tournament.

=== 2025 ===
On 24 August 2025, Henderson won her second Canadian Women's Open at the Mississaugua Golf & Country Club near Toronto, Ontario, Canada, her 14th win on the LPGA Tour.

=== 2026 ===
Henderson's sister Brittany Sepanik had served as her caddie for most of her career but took a yearlong maternity leave after the season-opening Hilton Grand Vacation Tournament of Champions. Veteran caddie John Killeen took over for Sepanik when Henderson started the Asian swing of the LPGA Tour season. Henderson reached a playoff at the 2026 Evian Championship, after carding a final-round 64. This included a hole-in-one, and an eagle on the 18th hole. She was beaten by Ryu Hae-ran on the first extra hole.

== Amateur wins ==
- 2010 CN du Quebec
- 2011 CN Future Links Ontario, Ontario Junior Girls Championship, Optimist Junior 13–14, Genesis Junior
- 2012 Ravenwood Junior Girls Championship, Ontario Junior Girls Championship, Canadian Junior Girls Championship
- 2013 South American Amateur, CN Future Links Pacific Championship, Canadian Women's Amateur
- 2014 Junior Orange Bowl International, South Atlantic Ladies' Amateur Championship (SALLY Tournament), Scott Robertson Memorial, Porter Cup, Ontario Women's Amateur, Espirito Santo Trophy (individual winner)

== Professional wins (20) ==
=== LPGA Tour wins (14) ===
Legend
Major championships (2)
Other LPGA Tour (12)

No.	Date	Tournament	Winning score	To par	Margin of victory	Runner(s)-up
1	16 Aug 2015	Cambia Portland Classic	66-67-65-69=267	−21	8 strokes	(South Korea) Jang Ha-na, (United States) Candie Kung (Thailand) Pornanong Phatlum
2	12 Jun 2016	KPMG Women's PGA Championship	67-73-73-65=278	−6	Playoff	(New Zealand) Lydia Ko
3	3 Jul 2016	Cambia Portland Classic (2)	65-68-70-71=274	−14	4 strokes	(United States) Stacy Lewis
4	18 Jun 2017	Meijer LPGA Classic	63-67-67-66=263	−17	2 strokes	(United States) Lexi Thompson, (United States) Michelle Wie
5	2 Oct 2017	McKayson New Zealand Women's Open	65-70-67-69=271	−17	5 strokes	(China) Jing Yan
6	14 Apr 2018	Lotte Championship	68-66-73-69=276	−12	4 strokes	(Spain) Azahara Muñoz
7	26 Aug 2018	CP Women's Open	66-66-70-65=267	−21	4 strokes	(United States) Angel Yin
8	20 Apr 2019	Lotte Championship (2)	65-68-69-70=272	−16	4 strokes	(South Korea) Ji Eun-hee
9	16 Jun 2019	Meijer LPGA Classic (2)	64-64-69-70=267	−21	1 stroke	(United States) Brittany Altomare, (Japan) Nasa Hataoka, (Australia) Su-Hyun Oh, (United States) Lexi Thompson
10	24 Apr 2021	Hugel-Air Premia LA Open	69-65-67-67=268	−16	1 stroke	(United States) Jessica Korda
11	12 Jun 2022	ShopRite LPGA Classic	67-70-64=201	−12	Playoff	(United States) Lindsey Weaver-Wright
12	24 Jul 2022	Amundi Evian Championship^{[1]}	64-64-68-71=267	−17	1 stroke	(United States) Sophia Schubert
13	22 Jan 2023	Hilton Grand Vacations Tournament of Champions	67-66-69-70=272	−16	4 strokes	(Sweden) Maja Stark, (England) Charley Hull
14	24 Aug 2025	CPKC Women's Open (2)	71-66-65-67=269	−15	1 stroke	(Australia) Minjee Lee

^{1} Co-sanctioned by the Ladies European Tour.

LPGA Tour playoff record (2–2)

No.	Year	Tournament	Opponent(s)	Result
1	2016	KPMG Women's PGA Championship	(New Zealand) Lydia Ko	Won with birdie on first extra hole
2	2020	ANA Inspiration	(United States) Nelly Korda (South Korea) Mirim Lee	Lee won with birdie on first extra hole
3	2022	ShopRite LPGA Classic	(United States) Lindsey Weaver-Wright	Won with eagle on first extra hole
4	2026	Amundi Evian Championship	(South Korea) Ryu Hae-ran	Ryu won with birdie on first extra hole

=== Symetra Tour wins (1) ===
No.	Date	Tournament	Winning score	To par	Margin of victory	Runners-up
1	21 Jun 2015	Four Winds Invitational	72-65-69=206	−10	3 strokes	(Philippines) Dottie Ardina (United States) Selanee Henderson (Italy) Giulia Molinaro

=== CN Canadian Women's Tour (4) ===
- 2012 Beloeil Golf Club event (as an amateur)
- 2014 Legends of Niagara event, PGA Women's Championship of Canada (both as an amateur)
- 2015 PGA Women's Championship of Canada

=== Other wins (2) ===
- 2015 SunCoast Series at Winter Garden, SunCoast Series Winter Championship

== Major championships ==
=== Wins (2) ===
Year	Championship	54 holes	Winning score	Margin	Runner-up
2016	Women's PGA Championship	2 shot deficit	−6 (67-73-73-65=278)	Playoff^{1}	(New Zealand) Lydia Ko
2022	The Evian Championship	2 shot lead	−17 (64-64-68-71=267)	1 stroke	(United States) Sophia Schubert

^{1} Defeated Ko in a sudden-death playoff: Henderson (3) and Ko (4).

=== Results timeline ===
Results not in chronological order.

Tournament	2013	2014	2015	2016	2017	2018	2019	2020	2021	2022	2023	2024	2025	2026
Chevron Championship		T26LA		T10	T14	T48	T17	T2	T19	T13	T23	T3	T44	T49
U.S. Women's Open	T59	T10	T5	64	T13	WD	T39	T44	T7	T15	12	CUT	CUT	T22
Women's PGA Championship			T5	1	2	T6	T30	6	T21	T16	T15	T22	T36	T3
The Evian Championship			T25	T9	T58	T10	T17	NT	T25	1	2	T26	T31	2
Women's British Open			T61	T50	T49	T11	T41	CUT	T13	T7	CUT	CUT	CUT	T29

Win
Top 10
Did not play

LA = low amateur
CUT = missed the half-way cut
WD = withdrew
NT = no tournament
T = tied

=== Summary ===
Tournament	Wins	2nd	3rd	Top-5	Top-10	Top-25	Events	Cuts made
Chevron Championship	0	1	1	2	3	8	12	12
U.S. Women's Open	0	0	0	1	3	7	14	10
Women's PGA Championship	1	1	1	4	6	10	12	12
The Evian Championship	1	2	0	3	5	8	11	11
Women's British Open	0	0	0	0	1	3	12	8
Totals	2	4	2	10	18	36	61	53

- Most consecutive cuts made – 18 (2013 U.S. Open – 2018 ANA)
- Longest streak of top-10s – 2 (five times)

== LPGA Tour career summary ==
Year	Tournaments played	Cuts made*	Wins	2nd	3rd	Top 10s	Best finish	Earnings (US$)	Money list rank	Scoring average	Scoring rank
2012	1	0	0	0	0	0	Cut	n/a	n/a	76.50	n/a
2013	3	2	0	0	0	0	T35	n/a	n/a	72.50	n/a
2014	4	4	0	0	0	1	T10	n/a	n/a	71.13	n/a
2015	4	4	1	0	1	0	1	100,294	90	70.38	n/a
2016	31	30	2	1	2	15	1	1,724,420	3	70.37	11
2017	30	28	2	1	0	8	1	1,504,869	6	69.88	10
2018	28	24	2	1	1	11	1	1,473,247	4	69.99	4
2019	27	25	2	1	1	13	1	1,696,017	4	69.55	3
2020	10	9	0	1	0	6	T2	648,604	10	69.70	2
2021	23	21	1	1	0	7	1	1,039,776	14	69.80	9
2022	22	18	2	1	0	10	1	2,413,251	4	69.51	4
2023	24	19	1	1	0	3	1	1,609,841	14	70.28	13
2024	24	22	0	0	3	9	3	1,320,020	19	70.78	19
2025	24	19	1	0	0	3	1	1,109,407	39	70.22	15
Totals^	247 (2015)	219 (2015)	14	8	8	83 (2015)	1	14,639,746	16		

^{^} Official as of 2025 season
*Includes matchplay and other tournaments without a cut

== World ranking ==
Position in Women's World Golf Rankings at the end of each calendar year.

Year	World ranking	Source
2014	221	
2015	17	
2016	8	
2017	14	
2018	9	
2019	8	
2020	6	
2021	10	
2022	7	
2023	12	
2024	25	
2025	24	

== Team appearances ==
Amateur

- Espirito Santo Trophy (representing Canada): 2012, 2014

Professional

- International Crown (representing World Team): 2025

== Awards ==
- 2015 Ontario Athlete of the Year (Syl Apps Athlete of the Year Award)
- 2015 Canadian Press Female Athlete of the Year (Bobbie Rosenfeld Award)
- 2017 Ottawa Person of the Year by The Athletic
- 2017 Canadian Press Female Athlete of the Year (Bobbie Rosenfeld Award)
- 2018 Canadian Press Female Athlete of the Year (Bobbie Rosenfeld Award)
- 2019 ESPY Award, Best Female Golfer
- 2019 LPGA Founders Award
- 2019 Canada's Sports Hall of Fame People's Choice Award
- 2022 Ottawa Key to the City

== See also ==
- List of golfers with most LPGA Tour wins
