= Jennifer Bermingham =

American professional golfer

Jennifer Bermingham is an American professional golfer from Long Beach, California.

In college, Bermingham competed for the UC Riverside Highlanders where she was named Big West Conference freshman of the year and was named all-conference four-times as well as first-team three-times. After college and while training to become a certified LPGA Teaching Professional, she spent 2010 and 2011 on the Symetra Tour with limited success.

She is a Class A LPGA Teaching Professional and the 2015 Sandy LaBauve Spirit Award winner, which honors the founder of LPGA USGA Girls Golf.

In 2016, she was the lone club professional to make the cut at the 2016 KPMG Women's PGA Championship. She was the first club professional to make the cut since 2007 and this was her first LPGA Tour event. Her finish earned her $6,851.

== Results in LPGA majors ==
Tournament	2016
ANA Inspiration	
Women's PGA Championship	T72
U.S. Women's Open	
Women's British Open	
The Evian Championship	

Did not play

T = tied
