= Greater Milwaukee Open =

Golf tournament formerly on the PGA Tour

U.S. Bank Championship in Milwaukee
Tournament information
- Location: Brown Deer, Wisconsin
- Established: 1968
- Course: Brown Deer Park Golf Course
- Par: 70
- Length: 6,759 yards (6,180 m)
- Tour: PGA Tour
- Format: Stroke play
- Prize fund: US$4,000,000
- Month played: July
- Final year: 2009

Tournament record score
- Aggregate: 260 Loren Roberts (2000); 260 Ben Crane (2005); 260 Corey Pavin (2006)
- To par: −24 Loren Roberts (2000)

Final champion
- (United States) Bo Van Pelt

Location map
- Location in the United States Location in Wisconsin

The Greater Milwaukee Open was a regular golf tournament in Wisconsin on the PGA Tour. For 42 years, it was played annually in the Milwaukee area, the final sixteen editions in the north suburb of Brown Deer at the Brown Deer Park Golf Course. U.S. Bancorp was the main sponsor of the tournament in its final years and the last purse in 2009 was $4 million, with a winner's share of $720,000. The event was run by Milwaukee Golf Charities, Inc., with proceeds going to a variety of Wisconsin charities.

== History ==
The tournament debuted in 1968 as the Greater Milwaukee Open (or GMO), competing against the British Open by offering a $200,000 purse (second highest on the Tour) with a $40,000 first prize. Lee Trevino, the recent U.S. Open winner, chose to play in the more lucrative GMO instead of the 1968 British Open.

Art Wall Jr., the 1959 Masters champion, won in 1975 at age 51 for his first tour win in nine years, his fourteenth and final win on the tour. Wall was one stroke ahead of 27-year-old runner-up Gary McCord, later a noted golf commentator, but winless in his career on the PGA Tour.

In 2004, U.S. Bank signed on as title sponsor. In July 2006, U.S. Bank and Milwaukee Golf Charities Inc. announced that U.S. Bank will remain the sponsor for at least three more years.

The tournament was played at four courses in the Milwaukee area:

Venue	City	Events	Years	Coordinates
North Shore Country Club	Mequon	3	1968–1970	43.213°N 87.949°W
Tripoli Country Club	Milwaukee	2	1971–1972	43.153°N 87.967°W
Tuckaway Country Club	Franklin	21	1973–1993	42.899°N 88.002°W
Brown Deer Park Golf Course	Brown Deer	16	1994–2009	43.155°N 87.953°W

It was nationally televised beginning in 1989, and Tiger Woods made his professional debut in 1996 at Brown Deer with a 67 on August 29, four days after winning his third consecutive U.S. Amateur title in Oregon. At age 20, he made the cut and tied for 60th place, earning a modest $2,544.

The event ended when U.S. Bank announced that it would not renew its sponsorship after the 2009 event. Secondary sponsor Aurora Health Care also announced that it would substantially cut back on its financial involvement. Before U.S. Bank's sponsorship, the tournament survived thanks to the help of late philanthropist Jane Pettit. Its slot on the PGA Tour schedule against the British Open, along with low attendance and TV ratings, were reasons cited by U.S. Bank for pulling out of the event. The Greater Milwaukee Charities organization has closed its offices and has shut down.

== Tournament highlights ==
- 1968: Dave Stockton wins the first Greater Milwaukee Open despite twice striking spectators with his drives in the final round. He beats Sam Snead by four shots.
- 1969: Ken Still shoots a final round 65 to beat Gary Player by two strokes. The win all but clinches Still a spot on the Ryder Cup team.
- 1970: Deane Beman makes the most of his withdrawal from the Open Championship to play in Milwaukee instead. He beats Don Massengale, Ted Hayes, and Richard Crawford by three shots.
- 1974: Ed Sneed is the tournament's first wire-to-wire winner. He beats Grier Jones by 4 shots.
- 1975: 51-year-old Art Wall Jr. beats Gary McCord by one shot.
- 1978: Lee Elder defeats Lee Trevino on the 8th hole of a sudden death playoff.
- 1979: Black golfer Calvin Peete, who did not take up golf until he was 23 years old, wins for the first time on the PGA Tour. He shoots a final round 65 to beat Jim Simons, Lee Trevino, and Victor Regalado by five shots.
- 1982: Calvin Peete wins at Milwaukee and on the PGA Tour for the second time and in almost carbon copy fashion from his 1979 win. He finishes two strokes ahead of Victor Regalado who was also runner-up in 1979.
- 1985: Jack Nicklaus competes in Milwaukee for the first time as a professional. He finishes second, three strokes behind winner Jim Thorpe.
- 1986: Corey Pavin wins in Milwaukee for the first time. He birdies the 4th hole of a sudden death playoff to defeat Dave Barr.
- 1989: Greg Norman competes in Milwaukee for the first time. He beats Andy Bean by 3 shots.
- 1993: Billy Mayfair holes a 20-foot chip shot on the fourth hole of a three-way sudden death playoff to defeat Mark Calcavecchia and earn his first PGA Tour title. Ted Schulz had dropped out on the first playoff hole after making bogey.
- 1996: Tiger Woods makes his professional debut at the age of 20 four days after winning his third consecutive U.S. Amateur title. He shoots -7 for the tournament (67-69-73-68), including his first-ever hole-in-one as a professional on the 14th hole during his final round, to finish tied for 60th and earn $2,544.
- 1997: Loren Roberts attempt to become the first Greater Milwaukee Open champion to defend his title is foiled when Scott Hoch sinks a 60-foot chip shot for eagle on the 72nd hole to beat Roberts and David Sutherland by one shot.
- 1999: Carlos Franco wins for the second time in his rookie season on the PGA Tour. He beats Tom Lehman by two shots.
- 2003: Kenny Perry birdies the 72nd hole to win by one shot over Stephen Allan and Heath Slocum.
- 2006: Corey Pavin sets a 9-hole PGA Tour scoring record, 26, on his way to a first round 61. Pavin, who had first won in Milwaukee in 1986, goes on to win the tournament for a second time, beating Jerry Kelly by two shots.
- 2009: Bo Van Pelt wins the final edition of the tournament. He defeats John Mallinger on the second hole of a sudden death playoff.

== Winners ==
Year	Winner	Score	To par	Margin of victory	Runner(s)-up	Winner's share ($)
U.S. Bank Championship in Milwaukee
2009	(United States) Bo Van Pelt	267	−13	Playoff	(United States) John Mallinger	720,000
2008	(Sweden) Richard S. Johnson	264	−16	1 stroke	(United States) Ken Duke	720,000
2007	(United States) Joe Ogilvie	266	−14	4 strokes	(South Africa) Tim Clark (United States) Tim Herron (South Korea) Charlie Wi	720,000
2006	(United States) Corey Pavin (2)	260	−20	2 strokes	(United States) Jerry Kelly	720,000
2005	(United States) Ben Crane	260	−20	4 strokes	(United States) Scott Verplank	684,000
2004	(Paraguay) Carlos Franco (2)	267	−13	2 strokes	(United States) Fred Funk (United States) Brett Quigley	630,000
Greater Milwaukee Open
2003	(United States) Kenny Perry	268	−12	1 stroke	(Australia) Stephen Allan (United States) Heath Slocum	630,000
2002	(United States) Jeff Sluman (2)	261	−23	4 strokes	(United States) Tim Herron (United States) Steve Lowery	558,000
2001	(Japan) Shigeki Maruyama	266	−18	Playoff	(United States) Charles Howell III	558,000
2000	(United States) Loren Roberts (2)	260	−24	8 strokes	(United States) Franklin Langham	450,000
1999	(Paraguay) Carlos Franco	264	−20	2 strokes	(United States) Tom Lehman	414,000
1998	(United States) Jeff Sluman	265	−19	1 stroke	(United States) Steve Stricker	324,000
1997	(United States) Scott Hoch (2)	268	−16	1 stroke	(United States) Loren Roberts (United States) David Sutherland	234,000
1996	(United States) Loren Roberts	265	−19	Playoff	(United States) Jerry Kelly	216,000
1995	(United States) Scott Hoch	269	−15	3 strokes	(United States) Marco Dawson	180,000
1994	(United States) Mike Springer	268	−16	1 stroke	(United States) Loren Roberts	180,000
1993	(United States) Billy Mayfair	270	−18	Playoff	(United States) Mark Calcavecchia (United States) Ted Schulz	180,000
1992	(Canada) Richard Zokol	269	−19	2 strokes	(United States) Dick Mast	180,000
1991	(United States) Mark Brooks	270	−18	1 stroke	(United States) Robert Gamez	180,000
1990	(United States) Jim Gallagher Jr.	271	−17	Playoff	(United States) Ed Dougherty (United States) Billy Mayfair	162,000
1989	(Australia) Greg Norman	269	−19	3 strokes	(United States) Andy Bean	144,000
1988	(United States) Ken Green	268	−20	6 strokes	(United States) Mark Calcavecchia (United States) Jim Gallagher Jr. (United States) Donnie Hammond (United States) Dan Pohl	126,000
1987	(United States) Gary Hallberg	269	−19	2 strokes	(United States) Wayne Levi (United States) Robert Wrenn	108,000
1986	(United States) Corey Pavin	272	−16	Playoff	(Canada) Dave Barr	72,000
1985	(United States) Jim Thorpe	274	−14	3 strokes	(United States) Jack Nicklaus	54,000
1984	(United States) Mark O'Meara	272	−16	5 strokes	(United States) Tom Watson	54,000
1983	(United States) Morris Hatalsky	275	−13	Playoff	(United States) George Cadle	45,000
1982	(United States) Calvin Peete (2)	274	−14	2 strokes	(Mexico) Victor Regalado	45,000
1981	(United States) Jay Haas	274	−14	3 strokes	(United States) Chi-Chi Rodríguez	45,000
1980	(United States) Billy Kratzert	266	−22	4 strokes	(United States) Howard Twitty	36,000
1979	(United States) Calvin Peete	269	−19	5 strokes	(Mexico) Victor Regalado (United States) Jim Simons (United States) Lee Trevino	36,000
1978	(United States) Lee Elder	275	−13	Playoff	(United States) Lee Trevino	30,000
1977	(United States) Dave Eichelberger (2)	278	−10	2 strokes	(United States) Morris Hatalsky (United States) Gary McCord (United States) Mike Morley	26,000
1976	(United States) Dave Hill	270	−18	3 strokes	(United States) John Jacobs	26,000
1975	(United States) Art Wall Jr.	271	−17	1 stroke	(United States) Gary McCord	26,000
1974	(United States) Ed Sneed	276	−12	4 strokes	(United States) Grier Jones	26,000
1973	(United States) Dave Stockton (2)	276	−12	1 stroke	(United States) Homero Blancas (United States) Hubert Green	26,000
1972	(United States) Jim Colbert	271	−13	1 stroke	(United States) Buddy Allin (United States) Chuck Courtney (United States) George Johnson (United States) Grier Jones	25,000
1971	(United States) Dave Eichelberger	270	−14	1 stroke	(United States) Ralph Johnston (Australia) Bob Shaw	25,000
1970	(United States) Deane Beman	276	−12	3 strokes	(United States) Richard Crawford (United States) Ted Hayes Jr. (United States) Don Massengale	22,000
1969	(United States) Ken Still	277	−11	2 strokes	(South Africa) Gary Player	20,000
1968	(United States) Dave Stockton	275	−13	4 strokes	(United States) Sam Snead	40,000

Note: Green highlight indicates scoring records.

== See also ==
- Other former PGA Tour events in Milwaukee
  - Milwaukee Open, 1940
  - Blue Ribbon Open, 1951
  - Milwaukee Open Invitational, 1955–61
