= Brown Deer Park Golf Course =

Golf course in Wisconsin, United States

Coordinates: 43°09′04″N 87°57′01″W

Brown Deer Park Golf Course is a public golf course maintained as part of the Milwaukee County Park System. The course was designed in 1929 by George Hanson. Since then, the course has been partially redesigned, the clubhouse has become a historic site and the course was the fourth and final course to host the U.S. Bank Championship in Milwaukee, a PGA Tour event that was held from 1968 to 2009 (the event was played at Brown Deer from 1994 to 2009). Located on the northwest side of the city of Milwaukee (not in Brown Deer), the course is surrounded by trees and features deep rough. Many famous golfers have played tournaments at the southeastern Wisconsin course. Jack Nicklaus, Greg Norman, Lee Trevino, and Ed Sneed have all competed here at some point in their careers. In 1996, Tiger Woods made his pro debut at the course when he played in the Greater Milwaukee Open. Despite making a hole-in-one on the 14th hole, he finished tied for 60th and took home $2,544 in earnings. Although the course no longer hosts a PGA Tour event, it remains the premiere course in the Milwaukee County Park System.

== Statistics ==
- Par: 71 (70 for the PGA TOUR)
- Yards: 6,759
- Rating: 72.9
- Slope: 133
- Bunkers: 60

== See also ==
- U.S. Bank Championship in Milwaukee
