= M. J. Hur =

South Korean professional golfer (born 1989)

M. J. Hur 허미정
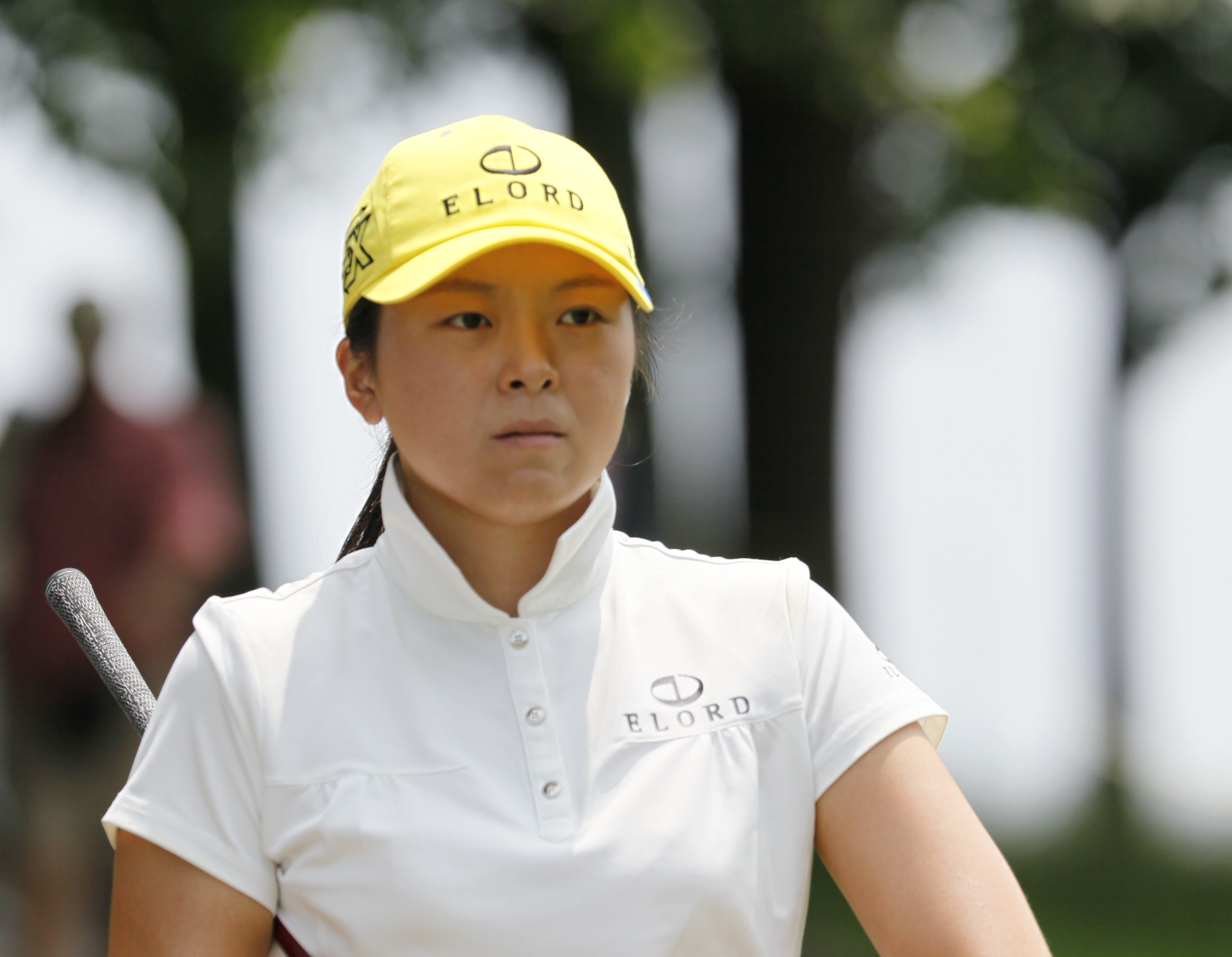
- Hur at the 2009 LPGA Championship

Personal information
- Full name: Mi Jung Hur
- Nationality: South Korea
- Born: 5 December 1989 (age 36) South Korea
- Height: 5 ft 10 in (178 cm)

Career
- Sport: Golf
- Turned professional: 2007
- Former tours: LPGA Tour (2009–2021); Futures Tour
- Professional wins: 5

Number of wins by tour
- LPGA Tour: 4
- Ladies European Tour: 1
- Epson Tour: 1

Best results in LPGA major championships
- Chevron Championship: T14: 2016, 2017
- Women's PGA C'ship: T30: 2012
- U.S. Women's Open: T3: 2017
- Women's British Open: T17: 2016
- Evian Championship: T3: 2014

Mi Jung "M.J." Hur (Korean: 허미정, born 5 December 1989) is a South Korean female professional golfer.

Hur played most of her amateur career in South Korea. In 2006, she received a sponsors exemption to play in the Hana Bank-KOLON Championship and made the most of it by finishing T6.

It was late in 2007 that Hur turned professional. She played the Futures Tour and notched one victory at the Louisiana Pelican Classic. Hur's 4th-place finish on the 2008 Futures Tour money list earned her a LPGA Tour card.

Hur's first win on the LPGA Tour was at the 2009 Safeway Classic. She defeated Suzann Pettersen and Michele Redman in a playoff.

== Professional wins (5) ==
=== LPGA Tour (4) ===
No.	Date	Tournament	Winning score	Margin of victory	Runner(s)-up
1	30 Aug 2009	Safeway Classic	−13 (69-69-65=203)	Playoff	(Norway) Suzann Pettersen (United States) Michele Redman
2	21 Sep 2014	Yokohama Tire LPGA Classic	−21 (64-70-67-66=267)	4 strokes	(United States) Stacy Lewis
3	11 Aug 2019	Aberdeen Standard Investments Ladies Scottish Open ^{1}	−20 (66-62-70-66=264)	4 strokes	(Thailand) Moriya Jutanugarn (South Korea) Lee Jeong-eun
4	29 Sep 2019	Indy Women in Tech Championship	−21 (63-70-66-68=267)	4 strokes	(Denmark) Nanna Koerstz Madsen

^{1} Co-sanctioned by the Ladies European Tour.

LPGA Tour playoff record (1–0)

No.	Year	Tournament	Opponents	Result
1	2009	Safeway Classic	(Norway) Suzann Pettersen (United States) Michele Redman	Won with birdie on second extra hole Redman eliminated by par on first hole.

=== Futures Tour (1) ===
No.	Date	Tournament	Winning score	Margin of victory	Runner-up
1	20 Apr 2008	Louisiana Pelican Classic	−10 (67-71-68=206)	Playoff	(United States) Vicky Hurst

== Results in LPGA majors ==
Results not in chronological order before 2019.

Tournament	2009	2010	2011	2012	2013	2014	2015	2016	2017	2018	2019	2020	2021
ANA Inspiration		CUT	CUT	T35	CUT	CUT	72	T14	T14	T55	T44		T40
U.S. Women's Open	CUT	T31	CUT	CUT	T25		62	CUT	T3	CUT		WD	CUT
Women's PGA Championship	T44	T34	T34	T30	T37	T62	T32	CUT	T36	CUT	WD		CUT
The Evian Championship ^					CUT	T3	CUT	T17	T64	CUT	T13	NT	CUT
Women's British Open	T46	T31	CUT	CUT	T52		CUT	T17	T39	T35	T64		CUT

^ The Evian Championship was added as a major in 2013.

Top 10
Did not play

CUT = missed the halfway cut
WD = withdrew
NT = not tournament
T = tied

=== Summary ===
Tournament	Wins	2nd	3rd	Top-5	Top-10	Top-25	Events	Cuts made
ANA Inspiration	0	0	0	0	0	2	11	7
U.S. Women's Open	0	0	1	1	1	2	11	4
Women's PGA Championship	0	0	0	0	0	0	12	8
The Evian Championship	0	0	1	1	1	3	8	4
Women's British Open	0	0	0	0	0	1	11	7
Totals	0	0	2	2	2	8	53	30

- Most consecutive cuts made – 8 (2016 British – 2018 ANA)
- Longest streak of top-10s – 1 (twice)
