= 2015 LPGA Tour =

Golf tour season

2015 LPGA Tour season
- Duration: January 28, 2015 – November 22, 2015
- Number of official events: 32
- Most wins: 5 (New Zealand) Lydia Ko
- Race to CME Globe Winner: (New Zealand) Lydia Ko
- Money leader: (New Zealand) Lydia Ko
- Vare Trophy: (South Korea) Inbee Park
- Rolex Player of the Year: (New Zealand) Lydia Ko
- Rookie of the Year: (South Korea) Sei-Young Kim

The 2015 LPGA Tour was a series of professional golf tournaments for elite female golfers from around the world. The Tour began in Ocala, Florida, on January 28 and ended on November 22 at the Gold Course of the Tiburón Golf Club in Naples, Florida. The tournaments were sanctioned by the United States–based Ladies Professional Golf Association (LPGA).

Lydia Ko won five tournaments, including one major, led the money list, won the Race to the CME Globe, and became the youngest winner of the LPGA Tour's Player of the Year award. Inbee Park also won five tournaments, including two majors, and won the Vare Trophy for the lowest scoring average. She also accumulated enough points to be inducted into the LPGA Hall of Fame upon her completion of her 10th year on tour (2016). Sei-Young Kim won three tournaments and the Rookie of the Year award.

== Schedule and results ==
The number in parentheses after each winners' name is the player's total number of wins in official money individual events on the LPGA Tour, including that event. Tournament and winner names in bold indicate LPGA majors.

Date	Tournament	Location	Winner	WWGR points	Purse ($)	Winner's share ($)
Jan 31	Coates Golf Championship	Florida	(South Korea) Na Yeon Choi (8)	62	1,500,000	225,000
Feb 8	Pure Silk-Bahamas LPGA Classic	Bahamas	(South Korea) Sei-Young Kim (1)	56	1,300,000	195,000
Feb 22	ISPS Handa Women's Australian Open	Australia	(New Zealand) Lydia Ko (6)	37	1,200,000	180,000
Mar 1	Honda LPGA Thailand	Thailand	(South Korea) Amy Yang (2)	56	1,500,000	225,000
Mar 8	HSBC Women's Champions	Singapore	(South Korea) Inbee Park (13)	62	1,400,000	210,000
Mar 22	JTBC Founders Cup	Arizona	(South Korea) Hyo-Joo Kim (2)	53	1,500,000	225,000
Mar 29	Kia Classic	California	(United States) Cristie Kerr (17)	68	1,700,000	255,000
Apr 5	**ANA Inspiration**	California	(United States) **Brittany Lincicome** (6)	100	2,500,000	375,000
Apr 18	LPGA Lotte Championship	Hawaii	(South Korea) Sei-Young Kim (2)	46	1,800,000	270,000
Apr 26	Swinging Skirts LPGA Classic	California	(New Zealand) Lydia Ko (7)	62	2,000,000	300,000
May 3	Volunteers of America North Texas Shootout	Texas	(South Korea) Inbee Park (14)	62	1,300,000	195,000
May 18^	Kingsmill Championship	Virginia	(Australia) Minjee Lee (1)	62	1,300,000	195,000
May 31	ShopRite LPGA Classic	New Jersey	(Sweden) Anna Nordqvist (5)	62	1,500,000	225,000
Jun 7	Manulife LPGA Classic	Ontario	(Norway) Suzann Pettersen (15)	62	1,500,000	225,000
Jun 14	**KPMG Women's PGA Championship**	New York	(South Korea) **Inbee Park** (15)	100	3,500,000	525,000
Jun 28	Walmart NW Arkansas Championship	Arkansas	(South Korea) Na Yeon Choi (9)	62	2,000,000	300,000
Jul 12	**U.S. Women's Open**	Pennsylvania	(South Korea) **Chun In-gee** (1)	100	4,500,000	810,000
Jul 19	Marathon Classic	Ohio	(South Korea) Chella Choi (1)	50	1,500,000	225,000
Jul 26	Meijer LPGA Classic	Michigan	(United States) Lexi Thompson (5)	37	2,000,000	300,000
Aug 2	**Ricoh Women's British Open**	Scotland	(South Korea) **Inbee Park** (16)	100	3,000,000	464,817
Aug 16	Cambia Portland Classic	Oregon	(Canada) Brooke Henderson (1)	53	1,300,000	195,000
Aug 23	Canadian Pacific Women's Open	British Columbia	(New Zealand) Lydia Ko (8)	68	2,250,000	337,500
Aug 30	Yokohama Tire LPGA Classic	Alabama	(United States) Kris Tamulis (1)	28	1,300,000	195,000
Sep 13	**The Evian Championship**	France	(New Zealand) **Lydia Ko** (9)	100	3,250,000	487,500
Sep 20	Solheim Cup	Germany	United States	n/a		
Oct 11	Sime Darby LPGA Malaysia	Malaysia	(United States) Jessica Korda (4)	62	2,000,000	300,000
Oct 18	LPGA KEB Hana Bank Championship	South Korea	(United States) Lexi Thompson (6)	62	2,000,000	300,000
Oct 25	Fubon LPGA Taiwan Championship	Taiwan	(New Zealand) Lydia Ko (10)	50	2,000,000	300,000
Nov 1	Blue Bay LPGA	China	(South Korea) Sei-Young Kim (3)	43	2,000,000	300,000
Nov 8	Toto Japan Classic	Japan	(South Korea) Ahn Sun-ju (1)	34	1,500,000	225,000
Nov 15	Lorena Ochoa Invitational	Mexico	(South Korea) Inbee Park (17)	26	1,000,000	200,000
Nov 22	CME Group Tour Championship	Florida	(United States) Cristie Kerr (18)	62	2,000,000	500,000

^ Kingsmill Championship finished on Monday May 18 due to a rain-delay.

== Season leaders ==
Money list leaders

Rank	Player	Country	Events	Prize money($)
1	Lydia Ko	New Zealand	24	2,800,802
2	Inbee Park	South Korea	25	2,630,011
3	Stacy Lewis	United States	26	1,893,423
4	Sei-Young Kim	South Korea	27	1,820,056
5	Lexi Thompson	United States	24	1,763,904
6	Amy Yang	South Korea	23	1,438,312
7	Cristie Kerr	United States	25	1,294,301
8	So Yeon Ryu	South Korea	25	1,292,395
9	Shanshan Feng	China	21	1,086,338
10	Anna Nordqvist	Sweden	25	977,743

Full 2015 Official Money List

Scoring average leaders

Rank	Player	Country	Average
1	Inbee Park	South Korea	69.42
2	Lydia Ko	New Zealand	69.44
3	Stacy Lewis	United States	69.79
4	Lexi Thompson	United States	70.01
5	Hyo-Joo Kim	South Korea	70.14

Full 2015 Scoring Average List

== Awards ==
Award	Winner	Country
Money winner	Lydia Ko	New Zealand
Scoring leader (Vare Trophy)	Inbee Park	South Korea
Player of the Year	Lydia Ko	New Zealand
Rookie of the Year	Sei-Young Kim	South Korea
Race to the CME Globe	Lydia Ko	New Zealand

== See also ==
- 2015 Ladies European Tour
- 2015 Symetra Tour
