= Dream First Bank Charity Classic =

Golf tournament in Kansas

Tournament information
- Location: Garden City, Kansas
- Established: 2014
- Course: Buffalo Dunes Golf Club
- Par: 72
- Length: 6,491 yards (5,935 m)
- Tour: Epson Tour
- Format: Stroke play
- Prize fund: $200,000
- Month played: August

Current champion
- (Malaysia) Mirabel Ting

The Dream First Bank Charity Classic is a tournament on the Epson Tour, the LPGA's developmental tour. It has been a part of the Epson Tour's schedule since 2014, first as the Garden City Charity Classic. It is held at Buffalo Dunes Golf Club in Garden City, Kansas.

The 2020 tournament was cancelled due to the COVID-19 pandemic.

== Winners ==
Year	Date	Winner	Country	Score	Margin of victory	Runner(s)-up	Purse ($)	Winner's share ($)
Dream First Bank Charity Classic
2026	Aug 30	Mirabel Ting	Malaysia	202 (−14)	3 strokes	(United States) Dorsey Addicks	200,000	30,000
2025	Aug 24	Yana Wilson	United States	205 (−11)	2 strokes	(Thailand) Trichat Cheenglab (United States) Daniela Iacobelli	200,000	30,000
2024	Jun 30	Kathleen Scavo	United States	204 (−12)	Playoff	(United States) Daniela Iacobelli	237,500	35,625
Garden City Charity Classic
2023	May 7	Gabriela Ruffels	Australia	197 (−19)	4 strokes	(Mexico) Isabelle Fierro (France) Agathe Laisné	200,000	30,000
2022	May 1	Gabriella Then	United States	204 (−12)	2 strokes	(United States) Alexa Pano	200,000	30,000
2021	May 2	Lilia Vu	United States	208 (−8)	1 stroke	(United States) Beth Wu	175,000	26,250
2020	Aug 16	No tournament					175,000	26,250
2019	Sep 8	Alejandra Llaneza	Mexico	206 (−10)	Playoff	(Thailand) Mind Muangkhumsakul	175,000	26,250
2018	Sep 9	Allyssa Ferrell	United States	200 (−16)	2 strokes	(United States) Dana Finkelstein (United States) Madison Pressel (Thailand) Pavarisa Yoktuan	150,000	22,500
2017	Sep 10	Anne-Catherine Tanguay	Canada	211 (−5)	3 strokes	(United States) Katelyn Dambaugh	150,000	22,500
2016	Sep 11	Dana Finkelstein	United States	277 (−11)	4 strokes	(United States) Brittany Benvenuto	150,000	22,500
2015	Sep 20	Vicky Hurst	United States	208 (−8)	2 strokes	(Jersey) Olivia Jordan-Higgins	100,000	15,000
2014	Sep 13	Min Lee	Chinese Taipei	210 (−6)	1 stroke	(Australia) Rebecca Artis (Canada) Jessica Wallace	100,000	15,000
