= Vicky Hurst =

American professional golfer

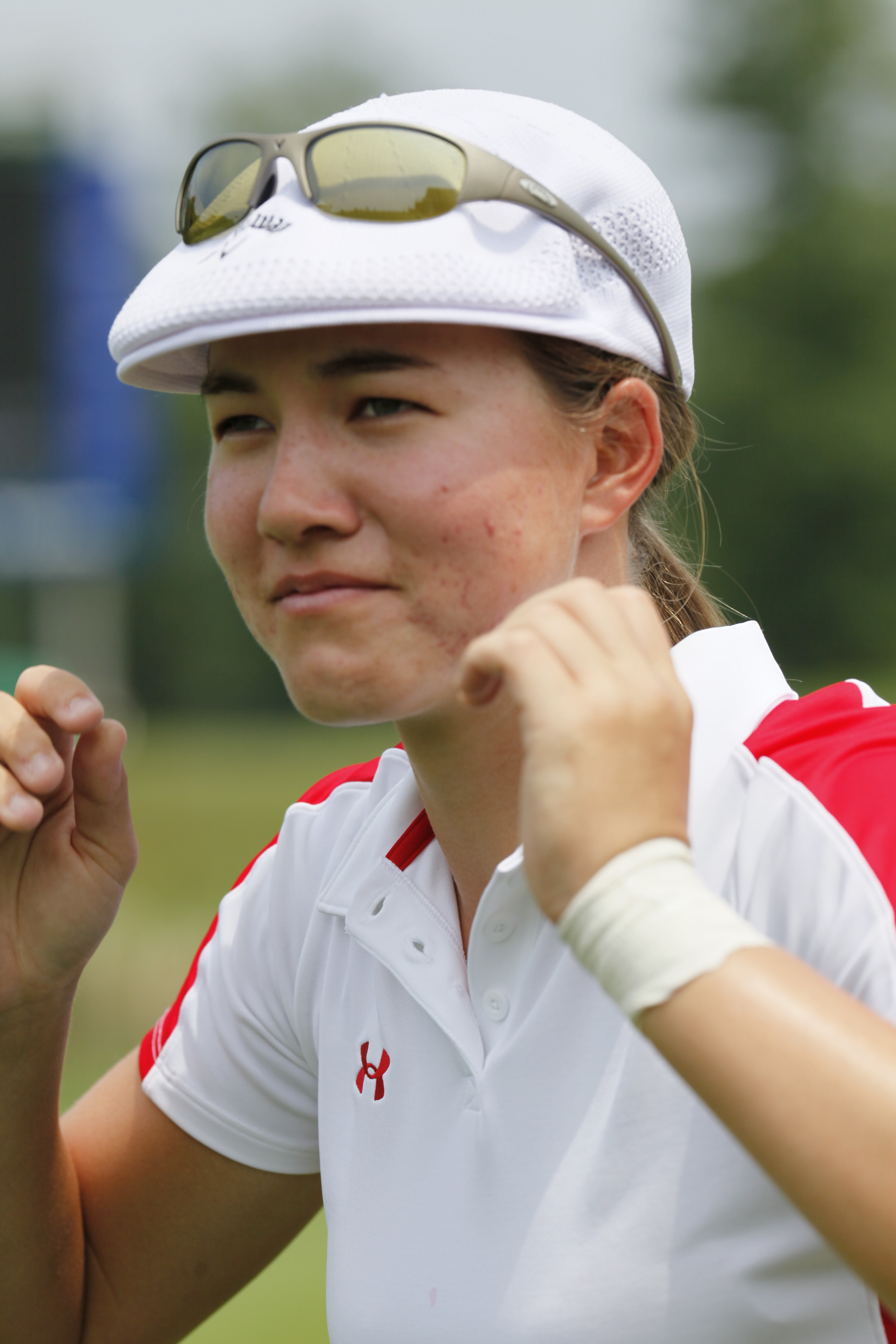
- Hurst at the 2009 LPGA Championship

Personal information
- Nationality: United States
- Born: June 19, 1990 (age 36) Andrews AFB, Maryland, U.S.
- Height: 5 ft 8 in (1.73 m)

Career
- Sport: Golf
- Turned professional: 2008
- Current tours: LPGA Tour (joined 2009); Symetra Tour (joined 2008)
- Professional wins: 8

Number of wins by tour
- Epson Tour: 8

Best results in LPGA major championships
- Chevron Championship: T11: 2012
- Women's PGA C'ship: T44: 2013
- U.S. Women's Open: T18: 2012
- Women's British Open: T17: 2012
- Evian Championship: T44: 2013

Achievements and awards
- AJGA Player of the Year: 2007
- Futures Tour Rookie of the Year: 2008
- Futures Tour Player of the Year: 2008

Vicky Hurst (born June 19, 1990) is an American professional golfer currently playing on the LPGA Tour.

She turned professional as a 17-year-old in 2008, while still in high school. Playing on the Futures Tour that year, she won five times and set a Tour record for single season earnings with $93,107.

== Childhood and family life ==
Hurst was born to a golfing family. While pregnant with Vicky, her mother Koko, a native Korean, was completing a round of golf at Andrews AFB near Washington, D.C. when her water broke on the 16th hole. Although winning the round, Koko left to give birth to Vicky at the base's medical center. Her father, Joe, who met Koko while he was stationed in Korea in the 1980s, was a retired Air Force colonel. He died suddenly of a massive stroke in April 2006 while Vicky, age 15, was practicing for the LPGA Ginn Open to which she had received a sponsor exemption. Hurst withdrew from the tournament and said she would dedicate the rest of her career to her father's memory. Hurst was raised in Melbourne, Florida, where she attended Holy Trinity Episcopal Academy and graduated in June 2008, part-way through her Futures Tour rookie year. She has an older sister, Kelly, also an accomplished golfer, was a member of the University of Florida golf team, though she never played.

== Amateur career ==
Hurst had a standout amateur career. In 2005, she won the Florida Women's State Golf Association Junior Girls' Championship, was named the FWSGA Junior Player of the Year and finished second at the Florida high school girls golf championship. In 2006, she was runner-up at the U.S. Girls' Junior and tied for second at the FWSGA Junior Girls' Championship. Also in 2006, she played in the U.S. Women's Open, less than two weeks after turning 16. She was named Florida Junior Player of the Year in 2006-07 and qualified again for the U.S. Women's Open in 2007. In 2007, she won three American Junior Golf Association (AJGA) events, and earned spots on the 2007 U.S. PING Junior Solheim Cup Team and Canon Cup, representing the East Team. She ended 2007 as the top-ranked amateur in the Polo Golf Rankings and was named the 2007 AJGA Player of the Year.

== Professional career ==
In the fall of 2007 at the start of her senior year in high school, Hurst faced a choice between pursuing a college golf career, for which she was heavily recruited by coaches, and turning professional. She participated in, and won, the Futures Tour qualifying school in November. In December she announced that she would skip college and join the Futures Tour in 2008, while completing high school at the same time. She also received sponsor exemptions to three LPGA Tour events in 2008, missing the cut in two of the events and finishing tied for 21st in the third.

In 2008, she competed full-time on the Futures Tour, winning five times and setting a Tour record for single season earnings with $93,107. She was named Rookie of the Year and Player of the Year and automatically qualified for full playing status on the LPGA Tour for the 2009 season. Her first tournament as an LPGA member was the 2009 season-opening SBS Open at Turtle Bay at which she finished tied for 15th and led the field in driving distance. Hurst finished her rookie year leading the LPGA Tour in driving distance with an average distance of 272.5 yards.

Hurst's endorsement contracts include Callaway Golf and Under Armour.

== Professional wins (8) ==
=== Symetra Tour wins (8) ===
No.	Date	Tournament	Winning score	To par	Margin of victory	Runner(s)-up	Winner's share ($)
1	Apr 27, 2008	Jalapeno Golf Classic	67-67-64=198	−18	3 strokes	(United States) Ashley Prange	11,900
2	Jun 17, 2008	**Michelob Ultra Futures Players Championship**	69-70-68-65=272	−8	4 strokes	(Australia) Sarah Jane Kenyon	16,100
3	Jun 29, 2008	Horseshoe Casino Classic at Lost Marsh Golf Course	70-76-67=213	−3	1 stroke	(South Korea) Jin Young Pak	12,600
4	Jul 13, 2008	CIGNA Golf Classic	68-73-68=209	−7	8 strokes	(United States) Natalie Sheary	11,200
5	Oct 19, 2008	Duramed Invitational	71-69-71=211	−8	1 stroke	(Scotland) Vikki Laing	21,000^{1}
6	Aug 16, 2015	W. B. Mason Championship	67-65-68=200	−13	3 strokes	(United States) Brittany Benvenuto, (Mexico) Alejandra Llaneza	16,500
7	Sep 20, 2015	Garden City Charity Classic	70-66-72=208	−8	2 strokes	(Jersey) Olivia Jordan-Higgins	15,000
8	May 13, 2018	Self Regional Healthcare Foundation Women's Health Classic	71-70-71-67=279	−9	1 stroke	(Philippines) Dottie Ardina	30,000

^{1} unofficial victory and earnings
Futures Tour majors are shown in bold.

== Results in LPGA majors ==
Results not in chronological order before 2015.

Tournament	2006	2007	2008	2009	2010	2011	2012	2013	2014	2015	2016	2017
ANA Inspiration					T44	T41	T11	T55	CUT			
Women's PGA Championship				CUT	T54	CUT	CUT	T44			CUT	CUT
U.S. Women's Open	CUT	CUT	CUT		T41	T45	T18	CUT				
Women's British Open				T28	T31	T28	T17	CUT			75	
The Evian Championship ^								T44			CUT	

^ The Evian Championship was added as a major in 2013.

Did not play

CUT = missed the half-way cut
T = tied

=== Summary ===
Tournament	Wins	2nd	3rd	Top-5	Top-10	Top-25	Events	Cuts made
ANA Inspiration	0	0	0	0	0	1	5	4
Women's PGA Championship	0	0	0	0	0	0	7	2
U.S. Women's Open	0	0	0	0	0	1	7	3
Women's British Open	0	0	0	0	0	1	6	5
The Evian Championship	0	0	0	0	0	0	2	1
Totals	0	0	0	0	0	3	27	15

- Most consecutive cuts made – 6 (2009 British Open – 2011 Kraft Nabisco)
- Longest streak of top-10s – 0

== LPGA Tour career summary ==
Year	Tournaments played	Cuts made*	Wins	2nd	3rd	Top 10s	Best finish	Earnings ($)	Money list rank	Scoring average	Scoring rank
2006	1	0	0	0	0	0	MC	0	n/a	80.00	n/a
2007	2	0	0	0	0	0	MC	0	n/a	74.50	n/a
2008	3	1	0	0	0	0	T21	19,864	n/a	72.75	n/a
2009	26	21	0	0	0	3	T5	305,773	44	71.76	30
2010	24	19	0	1	0	1	2	409,655	28	72.79	62
2011	23	17	0	0	0	1	T5	201,425	45	72.99	65
2012	27	18	0	0	0	3	4	401,457	35	72.95	71
2013	25	17	0	0	0	0	T17	135,119	74	72.69	77
2014	11	1	0	0	0	0	T65	2,939	162	75.95	156
2015	6	0	0	0	0	0	MC	0	n/a	75.70	n/a
2016	21	8	0	0	0	1	T10	85,991	101	73.07	122
2017	20	8	0	0	0	0	T31	60,471	125	72.43	124
2018	11	3	0	0	0	0	T53	10,995	160	74.79	162
2019	1	0	0	0	0	0	MC	0	n/a	–	n/a
2020	3	0	0	0	0	0	MC	0	n/a	75.33	n/a
2021	6	4	0	0	0	0	T35	13,388	164	73.40	n/a
2022	4	1	0	0	0	0	38	4,660	195	73.17	n/a
2023	1	0	0	0	0	0	MC	0	n/a	76.50	n/a

- official through the 2023 season

* Includes matchplay and other events without a cut.

== Futures Tour career summary ==
Year	Tournaments played	Cuts made	Wins	2nd	3rd	Top 10s	Best finish	Earnings ($)	Money list rank	Scoring average	Scoring rank
2008	13	13	4	3	0	9	1	93,107	1	70.28	1

^ Does not include victory and $21,000 won at Duramed Invitational, an unofficial event after the season on October 19.

== Team appearances ==
Amateur

- Junior Ryder Cup (representing the United States): 2006
- Junior Solheim Cup (representing the United States): 2007

Professional

- Solheim Cup (representing the United States): 2011

=== Solheim Cup record ===
Year	Total matches	Total W-L-H	Singles W-L-H	Foursomes W-L-H	Fourballs W-L-H	Points won	Points %
Career	2	1-1-0	1-0-0	0-0-0	0-1-0	1.0	50.0
2011	2	1-1-0	1-0-0 def. M. Reid 2 up	0-0-0	0-1-0 lost w/ B. Lincicome 5&4	1.0	50.0
