= Jaye Marie Green =

American professional golfer

Personal information
- Nationality: United States
- Born: February 2, 1994 (age 32) Boca Raton, Florida, U.S.
- Height: 5 ft 6 in (1.68 m)

Career
- Sport: Golf
- Turned professional: 2013
- Current tour: LPGA Tour (joined 2014)
- Former tour: Symetra Tour (joined 2013)

Best results in LPGA major championships
- Chevron Championship: T12: 2019
- Women's PGA C'ship: T18: 2018
- U.S. Women's Open: T5: 2019
- Women's British Open: T15: 2018
- Evian Championship: T41: 2014

Achievements and awards
- Girls' Junior Player of the Year: 2012

Jaye Marie Green (born February 2, 1994) is an American professional golfer and member of the LPGA Tour. She won the 2011 Junior Solheim Cup, was a finalist at the 2012 U.S. Women's Amateur, tied for 5th at the 2019 U.S. Women's Open, and was runner-up at the 2019 Volunteers of America Classic.

== Amateur career ==
Green grew up in Fort Lauderdale, Florida and started playing golf at the age of 11. She competed in the 2008 and 2010 U.S. Women's Amateur Public Links, the 2010 U.S. Girls' Junior and the 2010 U.S. Women's Open, after success in the sectional qualifier at Ormond Beach, Florida.

In 2011, she was a member of the victorious U.S. Junior Solheim Cup team. She also competed in the Daytona Beach Invitational on the Symetra Tour, where she finished runner-up, one stroke behind Haru Nomura of Japan.

In 2012, Green earned the Girls' Junior Player of the Year honors after an extraordinary year. She finished runner-up the Ione/Jones Doherty Championship behind Meghan Stasi, Women's Player of the Year. She was a quarter-finalist at the 110th North and South Women's Amateur and finished in 5th at the South Atlantic Amateur. She qualified for the 2012 U.S. Women's Open at Blackwolf Run in Kohler, Wisconsin.

Green lost the final of the 2012 U.S. Women's Amateur, 3 and 1, to Lydia Ko of New Zealand, who came into the final ranked No. 1 in the World Amateur Golf Ranking.

She made the cut at the 2012 Kraft Nabisco Championship after receiving an exemption into the field.

== Professional career ==
Green turned professional in January 2013 and competed on the Symetra Tour where she recorded three top-10 finishes. She earned medalist honors and set a tournament record with a 29-under 331 total at 2013 LPGA Q-School to earn membership of the 2014 LPGA Tour. She revisited Q-School in 2016 and became the first player to earn medalist honors twice at the LPGA Final Qualifying Tournament, by winning in 2013 and 2016.

She finished tied 5th at the 2019 U.S. Women's Open and posted a career-best runner-up finish at the 2019 Volunteers of America Classic with a season-low round of 64 in the third round, which propelled her to a high of 81st in the Women's World Golf Rankings.

In 2020, Green suffered a brutal bike accident. She fractured her right elbow and couldn't straighten it past a 90-degree angle. Requiring a 10-week recovery, she missed much of the season.

== Amateur wins ==
- 2010 Polo Golf Junior Classic
- 2011 Ping Invitational
- 2012 Rolex Tournament of Champions

== Results in LPGA majors ==
Results not in chronological order.

| Tournament | 2010 | 2011 | 2012 | 2013 | 2014 | 2015 | 2016 | 2017 | 2018 | 2019 | 2020 | 2021 | 2022 |
|---|---|---|---|---|---|---|---|---|---|---|---|---|---|
| Chevron Championship | | | T56 | | | CUT | CUT | | CUT | T12 | CUT | T40 | T65 |
| U.S. Women's Open | CUT | | CUT | | CUT | T26 | CUT | | | T5 | CUT | | CUT |
| Women's PGA Championship | | | | | T58 | CUT | CUT | T46 | T18 | T66 | CUT | CUT | CUT |
| The Evian Championship^ | | | | | T41 | CUT | | CUT | T54 | CUT | NT | T65 | |
| Women's British Open | | | | | | T56 | | T30 | T15 | CUT | | CUT | |

^ The Evian Championship was added as a major in 2013.

Top 10
Did not play

CUT = missed the half-way cut
NT = no tournament
T= tied

== U.S. national team appearances ==
Amateur

- Junior Solheim Cup: 2011 (winners)
