= Brianna Do =

American professional golfer (born 1990)

Personal information
- Full name: Brianna Catheryn Do
- Nationality: United States
- Born: January 3, 1990 (age 36) Long Beach, California, U.S.
- Height: 5 ft 3 in (160 cm)

Career
- Sport: Golf
- College: UCLA
- Turned professional: 2012
- Current tour: LPGA Tour (joined 2013)
- Former tour: Symetra Tour (joined 2012)

Best results in LPGA major championships
- Chevron Championship: DNP
- Women's PGA C'ship: T23: 2025
- U.S. Women's Open: CUT: 2012, 2014, 2017, 2026
- Women's British Open: CUT: 2016, 2025
- Evian Championship: T59: 2025

Brianna Do (born January 3, 1990) is an American professional golfer and LPGA Tour player. She won the 2011 U.S. Women's Amateur Public Links.

== Amateur career ==
Do started playing golf when she was eight years old. She was a two-time AJGA All-American, and a member of the 2007 Junior Solheim Cup team.

She attended UCLA 2008–2012 and played college golf with the UCLA Bruins women's golf team, earning all-conference honors and finished tied for 14th at the NCAA Championship as a senior.

In 2011, Do won the U.S. Women's Amateur Public Links at Bandon Dunes, where she beat Annie Park, 2 and 1, in the semifinals and Marissa Dodd, 1 up, with a birdie-par finish on holes 35 and 36 in the final.

== Professional career ==
Do turned professional in 2012 and joined the Symetra Tour, where her best finish in her rookie season was a tie for 6th at the Four Winds Invitational. In 2015, she was runner-up at the IOA Golf Classic and Symetra Tour Championship, to finish third on the Race for the Card money list and graduate to the LPGA Tour.

Do first gained partial status in 2013, and since 2017 has played mainly on the LPGA Tour. She recorded her first top-10 finish at the 2025 Riviera Maya Open, having shared the overnight lead.

== Amateur wins ==
- 2011 U.S. Women's Amateur Public Links

== Results in LPGA majors ==
Results not in chronological order.

Tournament	2012	2013	2014	2015	2016	2017	2018	2019	2020	2021	2022	2023	2024	2025	2026
Chevron Championship															
U.S. Women's Open	CUT		CUT			CUT									CUT
Women's PGA Championship			CUT		CUT		CUT	CUT		CUT	T62	CUT		T23	CUT
The Evian Championship							CUT		NT					T59	T65
Women's British Open					CUT									CUT	

Did not play

CUT = missed the half-way cut
NT = no tournament
T = tied

== U.S. national team appearances ==
Amateur

- Junior Solheim Cup: 2007
