= Casey Grice =

American professional golfer

Personal information
- Nationality: United States
- Born: October 16, 1991 (age 35) College Station, Texas, U.S.
- Height: 5 ft 6 in (168 cm)

Career
- Sport: Golf
- College: University of North Carolina
- Turned professional: 2013
- Current tour: LPGA Tour
- Former tour: Symetra Tour

Best results in LPGA major championships
- Chevron Championship: DNP
- Women's PGA C'ship: T50: 2016
- U.S. Women's Open: DNP
- Women's British Open: DNP
- Evian Championship: DNP

Casey Grice (born October 16, 1991) is an American professional golfer currently playing on the LPGA Tour.

== High school career ==
Grice was Texas 5A state champion in 2008 and runner-up in 2010.

== College career ==
For the North Carolina Tar Heels, she was an Honorable Mention All-American.

== Professional career ==
Grice played the 2014 and 2015 seasons on the Symetra Tour with one appearance on the LPGA Tour. Her finish on the money list of the 2015 Symetra Tour was high enough to earn a card for the 2016 LPGA Tour.
