= Alejandra Llaneza =

Mexican professional golfer

Personal information
- Full name: Alejandra Llaneza Gomez-Palacio
- Nickname: Ale
- Nationality: Mexico
- Born: 31 May 1988 (age 38) Mexico City, Mexico
- Height: 5 ft 2 in (1.57 m)

Career
- Sport: Golf
- College: University of Arizona
- Turned professional: 2012
- Current tour: LET Access Series
- Former tours: LPGA Tour; Symetra Tour
- Professional wins: 5

Number of wins by tour
- Epson Tour: 2
- Other: 3

Best results in LPGA major championships
- Chevron Championship: DNP
- Women's PGA C'ship: CUT: 2014, 2015, 2016
- U.S. Women's Open: CUT: 2015
- Women's British Open: DNP
- Evian Championship: CUT: 2014

Alejandra Llaneza Gomez-Palacio (born 31 May 1988) is a Mexican professional golfer. She has played on the U.S.-based LPGA Tour and Symetra Tour and was a 2016 Olympian.

== Early life and amateur career ==
In 1988, Llaneza was born in Mexico City. She was raised in the city. At the age of 6, Llaneza began playing golf.

Llaneza played college golf at the University of Arizona. She was Rookie of the Year during the 2007–08 year.

== Professional career ==
From 2012 and 2014, Llaneza played on the Symetra Tour. She has had eight top-10 finishes on the tour.

In 2013, Llaneza joined the LPGA Tour. Her best finish is T-12 at the 2014 Kingsmill Championship.

== Awards and honors ==
In 2008, while at the University of Arizona, she earned Rookie of the Year honors.

== Professional wins (5) ==
=== Symetra Tour wins (2) ===
- 2015 Self Regional Healthcare Foundation Women's Health Charity Classic
- 2019 Garden City Charity Classic

=== LET Access Series wins (1) ===
- 2025 Santander Golf Tour Ávila

=== Other wins (2) ===
- 2011 Wigwam Cactus Tour event (as an amateur)
- 2017 Pennsylvania Women's Open
