= 2026 Chevron Championship =

Golf tournament

Tournament information
- Dates: April 23–26, 2026
- Location: Houston, Texas, U.S. 29.773°N 95.433°W
- Course: Memorial Park Golf Course
- Tour: LPGA Tour
- Format: Stroke play – 72 holes

Statistics
- Par: 72
- Length: 6,811 yards (6,228 m)
- Field: 132 players, 72 after cut
- Cut: 146 (+2)
- Prize fund: $9,000,000
- Winner's share: $1,350,000

Champion
- (United States) Nelly Korda
- 270 (−18)
- Location in the United States Location in Texas

The 2026 Chevron Championship was the 55th Chevron Championship, an LPGA golf tournament held April 23–26 at Memorial Park Golf Course in Houston, Texas. The tournament was in its fifth year with Chevron Corporation as the title sponsor and its 44th year as a major championship.

Nelly Korda led wire-to-wire to win her second Chevron Championship and third major. The win also propelled her to the number one world ranking.

== Field ==
Players who have qualified for the event are listed below. Players are listed under the first category in which they qualified; additional qualifying categories are shown in parentheses.

1. Winners of all previous Chevron Championships

- Ko Jin-young (4,5)
- Lydia Ko (2,3,5,6)
- Nelly Korda (2,3,5,6)
- Jennifer Kupcho (3,5,6)
- Stacy Lewis
- Brittany Lincicome
- Mao Saigo (4,5,6)
- Patty Tavatanakit (5)
- Lexi Thompson (5)
- Yani Tseng
- Lilia Vu (2,3,5)
- Pernilla Lindberg did not play

2. Winners of the U.S. Women's Open, Women's PGA Championship, Women's British Open, and The Evian Championship in the previous five years

- Céline Boutier (5,6)
- Ashleigh Buhai (5)
- Chun In-gee
- Allisen Corpuz (5)
- Ayaka Furue (5,6)
- Brooke Henderson (3,5,6)
- Grace Kim (5,6)
- Minjee Lee (5,6)
- Anna Nordqvist
- Yuka Saso
- Maja Stark (5,6)
- Miyū Yamashita (3,5,6)
- Amy Yang
- Yin Ruoning (3,5,6)

3. Winners of official LPGA Tour tournaments from the 2024 Chevron Championship through the week immediately preceding the 2026 Chevron Championship

- Carlota Ciganda (4,5,6)
- Lauren Coughlin (5,6)
- Linn Grant (5,6)
- Hannah Green (5,6)
- Nasa Hataoka (5,6)
- Charley Hull (5,6)
- Hwang You-min (6)
- Im Jin-hee (5,6)
- Akie Iwai (5,6)
- Chisato Iwai (5,6)
- Moriya Jutanugarn
- Kim A-lim (5,6)
- Kim Hyo-joo (4,5,6)
- Kim Sei-young (5,6)
- Lee Mi-hyang (5)
- Lee So-mi (5,6)
- Ingrid Lindblad (5)
- Yealimi Noh (5)
- Ryu Hae-ran (4,5,6)
- Madelene Sagström (5)
- Linnea Ström
- Thidapa Suwannapura
- Rio Takeda (5,6)
- Jeeno Thitikul (5,6)
- Wang Xinying
- Chanettee Wannasaen (5)
- Lottie Woad (5,6)
- Angel Yin (5,6)
- Rose Zhang

4. All players who finished in the top-10 in the previous year's Chevron Championship

- Choi Hye-jin (5,6)
- Manon De Roey (5)
- Lindy Duncan (5,6)
- Ariya Jutanugarn (5,6)
- Liu Yan (5)
- Sarah Schmelzel (5) did not play

5. Top-80 on the previous year's season-ending LPGA Tour Race to the CME Globe points list

- Pajaree Anannarukarn
- Aditi Ashok
- Saki Baba
- Jenny Bae
- Robyn Choi
- Karis Davidson
- Gemma Dryburgh
- Nataliya Guseva
- Esther Henseleit (6)
- Hsu Wei-ling
- Minami Katsu (6)
- Gurleen Kaur
- Megan Khang
- Auston Kim (6)
- Stephanie Kyriacou
- Andrea Lee (6)
- Ilhee Lee
- Lucy Li
- Gaby López (6)
- Julia López Ramirez
- Nanna Koerstz Madsen
- Leona Maguire
- Brooke Matthews
- Benedetta Moresco
- Cassie Porter
- Paula Reto
- Pauline Roussin
- Gabriela Ruffels
- Jenny Shin
- Ina Yoon
- Yuri Yoshida
- Kristen Gillman did not play

6. Top-40 on the Women's World Golf Rankings as of a March 30, 2026

- Shuri Sakuma (7)

7. Top-2 players from the previous year's season-ending Ladies European Tour Order of Merit, LPGA of Japan Tour Order of Merit and LPGA of Korea Tour money list

- Hong Jung-min
- Sora Kamiya
- Mimi Rhodes
- Shannon Tan
- Ro Seung-hui (KLPGA) did not play

8. Any LPGA Member who did not compete in the previous year's Chevron Championship major due to injury, illness or maternity, who subsequently received a medical/maternity extension of membership from the LPGA in the previous calendar year, provided they were otherwise qualified to compete in the previous year's Chevron Championship

- Austin Ernst
- Alison Lee

9. Amateur exemptions

- Megha Ganne (a)
- Paula Martín Sampedro (a)
- Andrea Revuelta (a)
- Kiara Romero (a)
- Asterisk Talley (a)
- Yang Yun-seo (a)

10. Sponsor invitations

- Shauna Liu (a)
- Farah O'Keefe (a)

11. Top players on the current year LPGA Tour Race to the CME Globe points list at the end of the last official tournament prior to the current Chevron Championship, not otherwise qualified above

- An Na-rin
- Pei-Yun Chien
- Perrine Delacour
- Jodi Ewart Shadoff
- Laney Frye
- Melanie Green
- Erika Hara
- Frida Kinhult
- Mary Liu
- Ruixin Liu
- Yu Liu
- Nastasia Nadaud
- Yuna Nishimura
- Ryann O'Toole
- Alexa Pano
- Pornanong Phatlum
- Jessica Porvasnik
- Sophia Schubert
- Chiara Tamburlini
- Bailey Tardy
- Carla Tejedo Mulet
- Albane Valenzuela
- Suvichaya Vinijchaitham
- Dewi Weber
- Yana Wilson
- Jing Yan
- Zhang Weiwei
- Erica Shepard did not play

== Round summaries ==
=== First round ===
Thursday, April 23, 2026

Nelly Korda took a two shot lead, opening with a bogey-free round of 65 (−7). Lee So-mi and Patty Tavatanakit both shot 67 to tied for second place. Defending champion Mao Saigo shot a 73 (tied for 59th) and world number one Jeeno Thitikul shot a 74 (tied for 80th). Two amateurs were in the top-10, Farah O'Keefe, the 2025 Women's Amateur Championship runner-up and Yang Yun-seo, the 2025 Women's Amateur Asia-Pacific champion.

| Place | Player | Score | To par |
|---|---|---|---|
| 1 | (United States) Nelly Korda | 65 | −7 |
| T2 | (South Korea) Lee So-mi | 67 | −5 |
| T2 | (Thailand) Patty Tavatanakit | 67 | −5 |
| T4 | (China) Liu Yan | 68 | −4 |
| T4 | (United States) Farah O'Keefe (a) | 68 | −4 |
| T4 | (France) Pauline Roussin | 68 | −4 |
| T4 | (Japan) Yuri Yoshida | 68 | −4 |
| T8 | (South Korea) Im Jin-hee | 69 | −3 |
| T8 | (Japan) Sora Kamiya | 69 | −3 |
| T8 | (Denmark) Nanna Koerstz Madsen | 69 | −3 |
| T8 | (France) Nastasia Nadaud | 69 | −3 |
| T8 | (United States) Ryann O'Toole | 69 | −3 |
| T8 | (England) Mimi Rhodes | 69 | −3 |
| T8 | (Sweden) Maja Stark | 69 | −3 |
| T8 | (Sweden) Linnea Ström | 69 | −3 |
| T8 | (South Korea) Yang Yun-seo (a) | 69 | −3 |
| T8 | (South Korea) Ina Yoon | 69 | −3 |

=== Second round ===
Friday, April 24, 2026

Nelly Korda again shot a 65 to take a six stroke lead over Patty Tavatanakit. Amateur Farah O'Keefe was tied for third place after a round of 69. The cut line was 146 (+2). Defending champion Mao Saigo made the cut with a 144 while world number one Jeeno Thitikul missed the cut with a 147.

| Place | Player | Score | To par |
|---|---|---|---|
| 1 | (United States) Nelly Korda | 65-65=130 | −14 |
| 2 | (Thailand) Patty Tavatanakit | 67-69=136 | −8 |
| T3 | (United States) Farah O'Keefe (a) | 68-69=137 | −7 |
| T3 | (United States) Ryann O'Toole | 69-68=137 | −7 |
| T3 | (South Korea) Ina Yoon | 69-68=137 | −7 |
| 6 | (China) Liu Yan | 68-70=138 | −6 |
| T7 | (United States) Megan Khang | 72-67=139 | −5 |
| T7 | (France) Pauline Roussin | 68-71=139 | −5 |
| T7 | (Sweden) Maja Stark | 69-70=139 | −5 |
| T7 | (Thailand) Thidapa Suwannapura | 72-67=139 | −5 |

=== Third round ===
Saturday, April 25, 2026

Nelly Korda shot a 2-under-par 70 to take a five shot lead over Patty Tavatanakit into the final round. Amateur Farah O'Keefe shot an even-par 72 to maintain a spot in the top-10.

| Place | Player | Score | To par |
|---|---|---|---|
| 1 | (United States) Nelly Korda | 65-65-70=200 | −16 |
| 2 | (Thailand) Patty Tavatanakit | 67-69-69=205 | −11 |
| T3 | (France) Pauline Roussin | 68-71-67=206 | −10 |
| T3 | (China) Yin Ruoning | 71-69-66=206 | −10 |
| 5 | (South Korea) Ina Yoon | 69-68-71=208 | −8 |
| T6 | (China) Liu Yan | 68-70-71=209 | −7 |
| T6 | (Mexico) Gaby López | 74-69-66=209 | −7 |
| T6 | (United States) Yealimi Noh | 72-68-69=209 | −7 |
| T6 | (United States) Farah O'Keefe (a) | 68-69-72=209 | −7 |
| T10 | (South Korea) Im Jin-hee | 69-72-69=210 | −6 |
| T10 | (United States) Lexi Thompson | 72-72-66=210 | −6 |

=== Final round ===
Sunday, April 26, 2026

Champion

| Place | Player | Score | To par | Money ($) |
|---|---|---|---|---|
| 1 | (United States) Nelly Korda | 65-65-70-70=270 | −18 | 1,350,000 |
| T2 | (Thailand) Patty Tavatanakit | 67-69-69-70=275 | −13 | 669,859 |
| T2 | (China) Yin Ruoning | 71-69-66-69=275 | −13 | 669,859 |
| T4 | (China) Liu Yan | 68-70-71-67=276 | −12 | 393,221 |
| T4 | (South Korea) Ina Yoon | 69-68-71-68=276 | −12 | 393,221 |
| 6 | (South Korea) Kim Hyo-joo | 70-74-68-69=281 | −7 | 286,945 |
| T7 | (Australia) Hannah Green | 73-71-70-68=282 | −6 | 213,262 |
| T7 | (United States) Ryann O'Toole | 69-68-74-71=282 | −6 | 213,262 |
| T7 | (England) Lottie Woad | 73-72-67-70=282 | −6 | 213,262 |
| T10 | (England) Charley Hull | 72-70-69-72=283 | −5 | 165,789 |
| T10 | (United States) Angel Yin | 77-69-68-69=283 | −5 | 165,789 |
