= 2025 Chevron Championship =

Golf tournament

Tournament information
- Dates: April 24–27, 2025
- Location: The Woodlands, Texas; 30.193°N 95.550°W
- Courses: The Club at Carlton Woods; Jack Nicklaus Signature Course
- Tour: LPGA Tour
- Format: Stroke play – 72 holes

Statistics
- Par: 72
- Length: 6,911 yards (6,319 m)
- Field: 132 players, 81 after cut
- Cut: 146 (+2)
- Prize fund: $8,000,000
- Winner's share: $1,200,000

Champion
- (Japan) Mao Saigo
- 281 (−7), playoff
- Location in the United States Location in Texas

The 2025 Chevron Championship was the 54th Chevron Championship LPGA golf tournament, held April 24–27, at The Club at Carlton Woods in The Woodlands, Texas. The tournament was in its fourth year with Chevron Corporation as the title sponsor and its 43rd year as a major championship.

Mao Saigo, 2024 LPGA Rookie of the Year, won her first LPGA Tour event and first major championship in a five-way sudden-death playoff.

== Field ==
Players who have qualified for the event are listed below. Players are listed under the first category in which they qualified; additional qualifying categories are shown in parentheses.

1. Winners of all previous Chevron Championships

- Ko Jin-young (3,5,6)
- Lydia Ko (2,3,5,6)
- Nelly Korda (2,3,4,5,6)
- Jennifer Kupcho (5)
- Stacy Lewis
- Brittany Lincicome
- Pernilla Lindberg
- Patty Tavatanakit (3,5,6)
- Lexi Thompson (5)
- Yani Tseng
- Lilia Vu (2,3,5,6)
- Ryu So-yeon did not play

2. Winners of the U.S. Women's Open, Women's PGA Championship, Women's British Open, and The Evian Championship in the previous five years

- Céline Boutier (3,5,6)
- Ashleigh Buhai (3,5)
- Chun In-gee
- Allisen Corpuz (5,6)
- Ayaka Furue (5,6)
- Brooke Henderson (4,5,6)
- Kim A-lim (3,4,5,6)
- Kim Sei-young (5,6)
- Minjee Lee (3,5,6)
- Anna Nordqvist (5)
- Sophia Popov
- Yuka Saso (5,6)
- Amy Yang (3,5,6)
- Yin Ruoning (3,5,6)

3. Winners of official LPGA Tour tournaments from the 2023 Chevron Championship through the week immediately preceding the 2025 Chevron Championship

- Pajaree Anannarukarn (5)
- Lauren Coughlin (4,5,6)
- Linn Grant (5,6)
- Hannah Green (5,6)
- Moriya Jutanugarn (5)
- Megan Khang (5,6)
- Kim Hyo-joo (5,6)
- Ingrid Lindblad
- Leona Maguire (5)
- Yealimi Noh (4,5,6)
- Alexa Pano (5)
- Ryu Hae-ran (4,5,6)
- Madelene Sagström (5)
- Linnea Ström (5)
- Thidapa Suwannapura (5)
- Rio Takeda (6,7)
- Bailey Tardy (5)
- Atthaya Thitikul (5,6)
- Chanettee Wannasaen (5)
- Angel Yin (5,6)
- Mone Inami and Rose Zhang (5,6) did not play

4. All players who finished in the top-10 in the previous year's Chevron Championship

- Carlota Ciganda (5,6)
- Esther Henseleit (5,6)
- Im Jin-hee (5,6)
- Minami Katsu (5)
- Maja Stark (5,6)

5. Top-80 on the previous year's season-ending LPGA Tour Race to the CME Globe points list

- An Na-rin
- Pei-Yun Chien
- Choi Hye-jin
- Gemma Dryburgh
- Kristen Gillman
- Nataliya Guseva
- Georgia Hall
- Nasa Hataoka (6)
- Hsu Wei-ling
- Charley Hull (6)
- Ariya Jutanugarn
- Auston Kim
- Grace Kim
- Stephanie Kyriacou
- Andrea Lee
- Lee Mi-hyang
- Lee So-mi
- Lucy Li
- Lin Xiyu (6)
- Ruixin Liu
- Gaby López
- Nanna Koerstz Madsen
- Wichanee Meechai
- Hira Naveed
- Yuna Nishimura
- Ryann O'Toole
- Paula Reto
- Gabriela Ruffels
- Mao Saigo (6)
- Sarah Schmelzel
- Hinako Shibuno
- Jenny Shin
- Albane Valenzuela
- Arpichaya Yubol

6. Top-40 on the Women's World Golf Rankings as of a March 31, 2025

- Akie Iwai
- Miyū Yamashita (7)
- Ina Yoon (7)
- Ally Ewing, Alison Lee, and Jiyai Shin did not play

7. Top-2 players from the previous year's season-ending Ladies European Tour Order of Merit, LPGA of Japan Tour Order of Merit and LPGA of Korea Tour money list

- Manon De Roey
- Chiara Tamburlini
- Park Hyun-kyung did noy play

8. Amateur exemptions

- Carla Bernat Escuder (a)
- Chayse Gomez (a)
- Asterisk Talley (a)
- Clarisa Temelo (a)
- Lottie Woad (a)
- Jeneath Wong (a)
- Rianne Malixi did not play (injury)

9. Sponsor invitations

- Gianna Clemente (a)
- Jasmine Koo (a)

10. Top players on the current year LPGA Tour Race to the CME Globe points list at the end of the last official tournament prior to the current Chevron Championship, not otherwise qualified above

- Aditi Ashok
- Saki Baba
- Jenny Bae
- Lindy Duncan
- Savannah Grewal
- Muni He
- Caroline Inglis
- Chisato Iwai
- Jeon Ji-won
- Gurleen Kaur
- Frida Kinhult
- Cheyenne Knight
- Lee Jeong-eun
- Lee Jeong-eun
- Mary Liu
- Liu Yan
- Yu Liu
- Caroline Masson
- Brooke Matthews
- Morgane Métraux
- Benedetta Moresco
- Emily Kristine Pedersen
- Pornanong Phatlum
- Cassie Porter
- Pauline Roussin
- Alena Sharp
- Kate Smith-Stroh
- Gigi Stoll
- Elizabeth Szokol
- Miranda Wang
- Dewi Weber
- Jing Yan
- Yuri Yoshida
- Zhang Weiwei
- Zhang Yahui

== Round summaries ==
=== First round ===
Thursday, April 24, 2025
Friday, April 25, 2025

Liu Yan and Ryu Hae-ran shared the first round lead with rounds of 65, 7 under par. Inclement weather forced the suspension of round one on Thursday with 24 players still on the course. Defending champion Nelly Korda shot a 5-over-par 77.

Place	Player	Score	To par
T1	(China) Liu Yan	65	−7
T1	(South Korea) Ryu Hae-ran	65	−7
3	(South Korea) Kim Hyo-joo	67	−5
T4	(South Korea) Choi Hye-jin	68	−4
T4	(South Korea) Chun In-gee	68	−4
T4	(Spain) Carlota Ciganda	68	−4
T4	(Belgium) Manon De Roey	68	−4
T4	(Thailand) Ariya Jutanugarn	68	−4
T4	(United States) Brooke Matthews	68	−4
T10	(Thailand) Pajaree Anannarukarn	69	−3
T10	(England) Georgia Hall	69	−3
T10	(Japan) Minami Katsu	69	−3
T10	(United States) Andrea Lee	69	−3
T10	(United States) Lucy Li	69	−3
T10	(United States) Angel Yin	69	−3

=== Second round ===
Friday, April 25, 2025
Saturday, April 26, 2025

Liu Yan shot an even-par round of 72 to remain in first place. Her round included an albatross (double eagle) on the par-5 8th hole. Four golfers were one stroke off the lead: Lindy Duncan, Kim Hyo-joo, Mao Saigo, and Sarah Schmelzel. Defending champion Nelly Korda recovered from her opening round 77 with a round of 68 to make the cut. Fog delayed the start of play and nine players finished the round Saturday morning. The cut came at 146 (+2) with 81 players advancing to the weekend.

Place	Player	Score	To par
1	(China) Liu Yan	65-72=137	−7
T2	(United States) Lindy Duncan	72-66=138	−6
T2	(South Korea) Kim Hyo-joo	67-71=138	−6
T2	(Japan) Mao Saigo	70-68=138	−6
T2	(United States) Sarah Schmelzel	70-68=138	−6
T6	(South Korea) Choi Hye-jin	68-71=139	−5
T6	(Belgium) Manon De Roey	68-71=139	−5
T6	(South Korea) Ryu Hae-ran	65-74=139	−5
T6	(United States) Angel Yin	69-70=139	−5
T10	(Spain) Carlota Ciganda	68-72=140	−4
T10	(Thailand) Ariya Jutanugarn	68-72=140	−4
T10	(Australia) Minjee Lee	71-69=140	−4
T10	(South Korea) Lee So-mi	70-70=140	−4
T10	(United States) Elizabeth Szokol	71-69=140	−4
T10	(United States) Lexi Thompson	73-67=140	−4
T10	(China) Yin Ruoning	71-69=140	−4
T10	(China) Zhang Weiwei	72-68=140	−4

=== Third round ===
Saturday, April 26, 2025

Ryu Hae-ran and Mao Saigo shared the lead after the third round at 9 under par, leading Lindy Duncan by one stroke. Liu Yan, leader after each of the first two rounds, shot another par round of 72 to fall to a tie for fourth place.

Place	Player	Score	To par
T1	(South Korea) Ryu Hae-ran	65-74-68=207	−9
T1	(Japan) Mao Saigo	70-68-69=207	−9
3	(United States) Lindy Duncan	72-66-70=208	−8
T4	(China) Liu Yan	65-72-72=209	−7
T4	(United States) Sarah Schmelzel	70-68-71=209	−7
T6	(South Korea) Choi Hye-jin	68-71-71=210	−6
T6	(Spain) Carlota Ciganda	68-72-70=210	−6
T6	(Thailand) Ariya Jutanugarn	68-72-70=210	−6
T6	(United States) Lexi Thompson	73-67-70=210	−6
T6	(China) Yin Ruoning	71-69-70=210	−6

=== Final round ===
Sunday, April 27, 2025

Five players tied for the lead at 281 (−7) after 72 holes of play: Lindy Duncan, Ariya Jutanugarn, Kim Hyo-joo, Mao Saigo, and Yin Ruoning. In the sudden-death playoff, Saigo birdied the first hole to win her first LPGA Tour event and first major championship.

Champion
Low amateur
(a) = amateur
(c) = past champion

Place	Player	Score	To par	Money ($)
T1	(United States) Lindy Duncan	72-66-70-73=281	–7	Playoff
T1	(Thailand) Ariya Jutanugarn	68-72-70-71=281	–7	Playoff
T1	(South Korea) Kim Hyo-joo	67-71-73-70=281	–7	Playoff
T1	(Japan) Mao Saigo	70-68-69-74=281	–7	Playoff
T1	(China) Yin Ruoning	71-69-70-71=281	–7	Playoff
T6	(South Korea) Ko Jin-young (c)	72-70-71-70=283	–5	214,136
T6	(South Korea) Ryu Hae-ran	65-74-68-76=283	–5	214,136
T6	(United States) Sarah Schmelzel	70-68-71-74=283	–5	214,136
T9	(South Korea) Choi Hye-jin	68-71-71-74=284	–4	145,789
T9	(Spain) Carlota Ciganda	68-72-70-74=284	–4	145,789
T9	(Belgium) Manon De Roey	68-71-76-69=284	–4	145,789
T9	(China) Liu Yan	65-72-72-75=284	–4	145,789

Leaderboard below the top 10
Place	Player	Score	To par	Money ($)
13	(United States) Angel Yin	69-70-72-74=285	–3	131,356
T14	(United States) Nelly Korda (c)	77-68-71-70=286	–2	104,783
T14	(Australia) Minjee Lee	71-69-72-74=286	–2	104,783
T14	(United States) Lexi Thompson (c)	73-67-70-76=286	–2	104,783
T14	(China) Zhang Weiwei	72-68-72-74=286	–2	104,783
T18	(South Korea) Chun In-gee	68-73-71-75=287	–1	83,803
T18	(United States) Allisen Corpuz	74-72-73-68=287	–1	83,803
T18	(United States) Lauren Coughlin	71-71-70-75=287	–1	83,803
T18	(Germany) Esther Henseleit	73-73-72-69=287	–1	83,803
T18	(South Korea) Lee Mi-hyang	72-71-73-71=287	–1	83,803
T18	(Thailand) Chanettee Wannasaen	73-68-73-73=287	–1	83,803
T24	(South Korea) Kim Sei-young	73-70-70-75=288	E	69,424
T24	(South Korea) Lee So-mi	70-70-71-77=288	E	69,424
T24	(Denmark) Emily Kristine Pedersen	72-69-72-75=288	E	69,424
T24	(Thailand) Atthaya Thitikul	71-75-71-71=288	E	69,424
T28	(England) Georgia Hall	69-72-74-74=289	+1	61,648
T28	(United States) Brooke Matthews	68-75-74-72=289	+1	61,648
T30	(Thailand) Pajaree Anannarukarn	69-72-74-75=290	+2	48,689
T30	(Japan) Ayaka Furue	71-72-74-73=290	+2	48,689
T30	(Japan) Chisato Iwai	72-71-76-71=290	+2	48,689
T30	(Australia) Stephanie Kyriacou	74-71-73-72=290	+2	48,689
T30	(United States) Andrea Lee	69-76-73-72=290	+2	48,689
T30	(United States) Lucy Li	69-73-71-77=290	+2	48,689
T30	(Germany) Sophia Popov	72-73-70-75=290	+2	48,689
T30	(United States) Elizabeth Szokol	71-69-75-75=290	+2	48,689
T30	(Netherlands) Dewi Weber	71-74-72-73=290	+2	48,689
T30	(Japan) Miyū Yamashita	73-70-73-74=290	+2	48,689
T40	(United States) Megan Khang	73-69-75-74=291	+3	36,286
T40	(South Korea) Kim A-lim	71-73-75-72=291	+3	36,286
T40	(Australia) Cassie Porter	74-71-73-73=291	+3	36,286
T40	(Japan) Yuri Yoshida	73-73-76-69=291	+3	36,286
T44	(Canada) Brooke Henderson	72-73-75-72=292	+4	28,741
T44	(Japan) Akie Iwai	72-72-73-75=292	+4	28,741
T44	(United States) Auston Kim	72-69-70-81=292	+4	28,741
T44	(Japan) Yuna Nishimura	75-71-72-74=292	+4	28,741
T44	(Australia) Gabriela Ruffels	72-74-70-76=292	+4	28,741
T44	(Japan) Hinako Shibuno	73-71-72-76=292	+4	28,741
T44	(Sweden) Maja Stark	72-73-75-72=292	+4	28,741
T44	(Switzerland) Albane Valenzuela	70-74-72-76=292	+4	28,741
T52	(Japan) Nasa Hataoka	73-72-77-71=293	+5	22,215
T52	(United States) Cheyenne Knight	72-73-70-78=293	+5	22,215
T52	(New Zealand) Lydia Ko (c)	73-72-75-73=293	+5	22,215
T52	(Sweden) Ingrid Lindblad	74-71-74-74=293	+5	22,215
T52	(China) Miranda Wang	72-69-76-76=293	+5	22,215
T52	(South Korea) Amy Yang	75-70-71-77=293	+5	22,215
T52	(South Korea) Ina Yoon	72-71-76-74=293	+5	22,215
T59	(Australia) Grace Kim	74-70-77-73=294	+6	18,639
T59	(Sweden) Anna Nordqvist	75-71-73-75=294	+6	18,639
T59	(Japan) Rio Takeda	73-70-72-79=294	+6	18,639
T62	(India) Aditi Ashok	72-74-77-72=295	+7	17,032
T62	(South Africa) Ashleigh Buhai	79-66-74-76=295	+7	17,032
T62	(Japan) Minami Katsu	69-77-74-75=295	+7	17,032
T62	(France) Pauline Roussin	72-74-74-75=295	+7	17,032
T62	(Thailand) Thidapa Suwannapura	75-71-74-75=295	+7	17,032
T67	(Republic of Ireland) Leona Maguire	75-71-75-75=296	+8	15,551
T67	(United States) Alexa Pano	73-69-76-78=296	+8	15,551
T67	(Canada) Alena Sharp	72-73-77-74=296	+8	15,551
70	(United States) Gigi Stoll	75-70-77-75=297	+9	14,812
T71	(United States) Gianna Clemente (a)	71-70-80-77=298	+10	0
T71	(South Africa) Paula Reto	78-68-76-76=298	+10	14,533
T71	(South Korea) Jenny Shin	74-68-79-77=298	+10	14,533
T74	(South Korea) Im Jin-hee	75-71-77-76=299	+11	14,161
T74	(China) Yu Liu	71-74-77-77=299	+11	14,161
T76	(Chinese Taipei) Pei-Yun Chien	74-72-77-77=300	+12	13,812
T76	(Sweden) Frida Kinhult	70-76-77-77=300	+12	13,812
78	(United States) Lilia Vu (c)	71-74-78-78=301	+13	13,549
T79	(South Korea) Lee Jeong-eun	71-74-78-79=302	+14	13,291
T79	(United States) Ryann O'Toole	72-74-78-78=302	+14	13,291
81	(Sweden) Pernilla Lindberg (c)	74-72-82-75=303	+15	13,037
CUT	(France) Céline Boutier	72-75=147	+3	
CUT	(Scotland) Gemma Dryburgh	72-75=147	+3	
CUT	(Sweden) Linn Grant	72-75=147	+3	
CUT	(Russia) Nataliya Guseva	75-72=147	+3	
CUT	(United States) Jennifer Kupcho (c)	72-75=147	+3	
CUT	(Mexico) Gaby López	72-75=147	+3	
CUT	(Switzerland) Morgane Métraux	75-72=147	+3	
CUT	(Italy) Benedetta Moresco	74-73=147	+3	
CUT	(Sweden) Madelene Sagström	74-73=147	+3	
CUT	(United States) Kate Smith-Stroh	74-73=147	+3	
CUT	(United States) Jenny Bae	74-74=148	+4	
CUT	(United States) Kristen Gillman	76-72=148	+4	
CUT	(England) Charley Hull	75-73=148	+4	
CUT	(United States) Gurleen Kaur	74-74=148	+4	
CUT	(China) Lin Xiyu	77-71=148	+4	
CUT	(Germany) Caroline Masson	73-75=148	+4	
CUT	(United States) Bailey Tardy	75-73=148	+4	
CUT	(England) Lottie Woad (a)	75-73=148	+4	
CUT	(China) Jing Yan	76-72=148	+4	
CUT	(Thailand) Arpichaya Yubol	75-73=148	+4	
CUT	(China) Zhang Yahui	75-73=148	+4	
CUT	(South Korea) An Na-rin	74-75=149	+5	
CUT	(United States) Caroline Inglis	72-77=149	+5	
CUT	(United States) Jasmine Koo (a)	70-79=149	+5	
CUT	(China) Mary Liu	79-70=149	+5	
CUT	(China) Ruixin Liu	75-74=149	+5	
CUT	(Chinese Taipei) Yani Tseng (c)	74-75=149	+5	
CUT	(Japan) Saki Baba	77-73=150	+6	
CUT	(Australia) Hannah Green	73-77=150	+6	
CUT	(Canada) Savannah Grewal	75-75=150	+6	
CUT	(China) Muni He	75-75=150	+6	
CUT	(Chinese Taipei) Hsu Wei-ling	80-70=150	+6	
CUT	(South Korea) Lee Jeong-eun	77-73=150	+6	
CUT	(Denmark) Nanna Koerstz Madsen	73-77=150	+6	
CUT	(Japan) Yuka Saso	75-75=150	+6	
CUT	(Sweden) Linnea Ström	73-77=150	+6	
CUT	(Switzerland) Chiara Tamburlini	73-77=150	+6	
CUT	(Thailand) Patty Tavatanakit (c)	75-75=150	+6	
CUT	(Mexico) Clarisa Temelo (a)	78-72=150	+6	
CUT	(Spain) Carla Bernat Escuder (a)	72-79=151	+7	
CUT	(United States) Stacy Lewis (c)	75-76=151	+7	
CUT	(United States) Yealimi Noh	74-77=151	+7	
CUT	(Australia) Hira Naveed	78-74=152	+8	
CUT	(Thailand) Pornanong Phatlum	76-76=152	+8	
CUT	(South Korea) Jeon Ji-won	72-81=153	+9	
CUT	(Thailand) Wichanee Meechai	81-72=153	+9	
CUT	(Thailand) Moriya Jutanugarn	78-76=154	+10	
CUT	(Malaysia) Jeneath Wong (a)	78-76=154	+10	
CUT	(United States) Brittany Lincicome (c)	79-76=155	+11	
CUT	(United States) Asterisk Talley (a)	78-77=155	+11	
CUT	(United States) Chayse Gomez (a)	79-80=159	+15	

==== Playoff ====
The sudden-death playoff began on the par-5 18th hole; Saigo birdied to win the title.

Place	Player	Score	To par	Money ($)
1	(Japan) Mao Saigo	4	–1	1,200,000
T2	(Thailand) Ariya Jutanugarn	5	E	462,966
T2	(South Korea) Kim Hyo-joo	5	E	462,966
T2	(China) Yin Ruoning	5	E	462,966
T2	(United States) Lindy Duncan	6	+1	462,966
