= 2022 Evian Championship =

Tournament information
- Dates: 21–24 July 2022
- Location: Évian-les-Bains, France; 46.394°N 6.570°E
- Course: Evian Resort Golf Club
- Tours: Ladies European Tour; LPGA Tour

Statistics
- Par: 71
- Length: 6,325 yards (5,784 m)
- Field: 132 players, 73 after cut
- Cut: 142 (E)
- Prize fund: $6,500,000
- Winner's share: $1,000,000

Champion
- (Canada) Brooke Henderson
- 267 (−17)

Location map
- Location in France Location in Auvergne-Rhône-Alpes

The 2022 Evian Championship was played 21–24 July at the Evian Resort Golf Club in Évian-les-Bains, France. It was the 28th Evian Championship (the first 20 played as the Evian Masters), and the ninth as a major championship on the LPGA Tour. The event was televised by Golf Channel in the United States and Sky Sports in the United Kingdom.

Brooke Henderson won with a score of 267, 17-under-par, a stroke ahead of Sophia Schubert.

== Field ==
The field for the tournament was set at 132, and most earned exemptions based on past performance on the Ladies European Tour, the LPGA Tour, or with a high ranking in the Women's World Golf Rankings.

These were the exemption categories for the 2022 Evian Championship.

1. Evian invitations (six)

Anna Davis (a), Rachel Heck (a), Aline Krauter (a), Agathe Laisné, Benedetta Moresco (a), Rose Zhang (a)

2. Winner of the Jabra Ladies Open

Tiia Koivisto

3. Past Winners Evian Masters

Angela Stanford

4. Top 50 from Rolex World Ranking

Marina Alex, An Na-rin, Pia Babnik, Céline Boutier, Choi Hye-jin, Chun In-gee, Ally Ewing, Ayaka Furue, Hannah Green, Georgia Hall, Mina Harigae, Nasa Hataoka, Brooke Henderson, Charley Hull, Ji Eun-hee, Ariya Jutanugarn, Megan Khang, Kim A-lim, Kim Hyo-joo, Kim Sei-young, Ko Jin-young, Lydia Ko, Jessica Korda, Nelly Korda, Jennifer Kupcho, Lee Jeong-eun, Minjee Lee, Lin Xiyu, Nanna Koerstz Madsen, Leona Maguire, Yuna Nishimura, Anna Nordqvist, Ryann O'Toole, Inbee Park, Park Min-ji, Ryu So-yeon, Madelene Sagström, Mao Saigo, Lizette Salas, Yuka Saso, Hinako Shibuno, Patty Tavatanakit, Atthaya Thitikul

5. Majors Winners

Kim In-kyung, Park Sung-hyun, Sophia Popov

6. LPGA Tournament Winners

Cristie Kerr, Gina Kim

7. LET OOM

Olivia Cowan, Manon De Roey, Linn Grant, Johanna Gustavsson, Stephanie Kyriacou, Meghan MacLaren, Sanna Nuutinen, Lee-Anne Pace, Magdalena Simmermacher, Marianne Skarpnord, Maja Stark

8. Top 10 & Ties Previous Year Evian Championship

Pajaree Anannarukarn, Yealimi Noh, Amy Yang

9. Winner U.S. Women's Amateur Championship

Jensen Castle (a)

10. Winner British Ladies Amateur Championship

Jess Baker (a)

11. Winner Women's Amateur Asia-Pacific Championship

Mizuki Hashimoto (a)

12. Winner Latin America Women's Amateur Championship

Valery Plata (a)

13. CME Globe Points

Brittany Altomare, Aditi Ashok, Ashleigh Buhai, Matilda Castren, Jennifer Chang, Peiyun Chien, Chella Choi, Carlota Ciganda, Jenny Coleman, Allisen Corpuz, Lauren Coughlin, Perrine Delacour, Amanda Doherty, Gemma Dryburgh, Jodi Ewart Shadoff, Isi Gabsa, Esther Henseleit, Hong Yae-eun, Hsu Wei-ling, Janie Jackson, Moriya Jutanugarn, Haeji Kang, Sarah Kemp, Frida Kinhult, Cheyenne Knight, Bronte Law, Maude-Aimee Leblanc, Alison Lee, Andrea Lee, Lee Jeong-eun, Ruixin Liu, Yu Liu, Gaby López, Caroline Masson, Stephanie Meadow, Wichanee Meechai, Morgane Métraux, Su-Hyun Oh, Amy Olson, Annie Park, Pornanong Phatlum, Mel Reid, Paula Reto, Pauline Roussin-Bouchard, Sarah Schmelzel, Sophia Schubert, Jenny Shin, Jennifer Song, Lauren Stephenson, Thidapa Suwannapura, Emma Talley, Kelly Tan, Charlotte Thomas, Alana Uriell, Albane Valenzuela, Lilia Vu, Lindsey Weaver-Wright, Angel Yin

== Course ==
Hole	1	2	3	4	5	6	7	8	9	Out	10	11	12	13	14	15	16	17	18	In	Total
Par	4	3	4	4	3	4	5	3	5	35	4	4	4	4	3	5	3	4	5	36	71
Yards	390	165	349	421	167	373	534	188	503	3,090	404	352	404	418	175	542	149	327	464	3,235	6,325
Metres	357	151	319	385	153	341	488	172	460	2,826	369	322	369	382	160	496	136	299	424	2,957	5,783

== Round summaries ==
=== First round ===
Thursday, 21 July 2022

Ayaka Furue shot an 8-under-par 63 to take a one stroke lead over Brooke Henderson and Nelly Korda. Defending champion Minjee Lee was seven strokes back at −1.

Place	Player	Score	To par
1	(Japan) Ayaka Furue	63	−8
T2	(Canada) Brooke Henderson	64	−7
T2	(United States) Nelly Korda	64	−7
4	(United States) Cheyenne Knight	65	−6
T5	(France) Perrine Delacour	66	−5
T5	(England) Charley Hull	66	−5
T5	(South Korea) Ko Jin-young	66	−5
T5	(New Zealand) Lydia Ko	66	−5
T5	(Japan) Yuna Nishimura	66	−5
T10	(South Korea) Chun In-gee	67	−4
T10	(Spain) Carlota Ciganda	67	−4
T10	(Sweden) Linn Grant	67	−4
T10	(South Korea) Ji Eun-hee	67	−4
T10	(Denmark) Nanna Koerstz Madsen	67	−4
T10	(Sweden) Anna Nordqvist	67	−4
T10	(South Korea) Park Min-ji	67	−4
T10	(South Korea) Park Sung-hyun	67	−4
T10	(South Korea) Ryu So-yeon	67	−4

=== Second round ===
Friday, 22 July 2022

Brooke Henderson shot a second consecutive round of 64 to take a three-stroke lead over Nelly Korda. First round leader Ayaka Furue shot a 72 to drop seven strokes off the lead. Defending champion Minjee Lee was in a tied for 30th place. The cut was at 142, even par, with 73 golfers advancing to the weekend.

Place	Player	Score	To par
1	(Canada) Brooke Henderson	64-64=128	−14
2	(United States) Nelly Korda	64-67=131	−11
T3	(South Korea) Kim Sei-young	68-65=133	−9
T3	(South Korea) Ryu So-yeon	67-66=133	−9
T5	(Spain) Carlota Ciganda	67-67=134	−8
T5	(France) Perrine Delacour	66-68=134	−8
T5	(South Korea) Kim Hyo-joo	68-66=134	−8
T5	(United States) Andrea Lee	69-65=134	−8
T5	(United States) Sophia Schubert	69-65=134	−8
T5	(Thailand) Atthaya Thitikul	68-66=134	−8

=== Third round ===
Saturday, 23 July 2022

Brooke Henderson shot a 68 to stay in first place, two strokes ahead of Ryu So-yeon.

Place	Player	Score	To par
1	(Canada) Brooke Henderson	64-64-68=196	−17
2	(South Korea) Ryu So-yeon	67-66-65=198	−15
3	(United States) Sophia Schubert	69-65-66=200	−13
T4	(Spain) Carlota Ciganda	67-67-67=201	−12
T4	(South Korea) Kim Sei-young	68-65-68=201	−12
T6	(England) Charley Hull	66-69-67=202	−11
T6	(South Korea) Kim Hyo-joo	68-66-68=202	−11
T6	(South Korea) Ko Jin-young	66-69-67=202	−11
T6	(United States) Nelly Korda	64-67-71=202	−11
T6	(Thailand) Atthaya Thitikul	68-66-68=202	−11

=== Final round ===
Sunday, 24 July 2022

Place	Player	Score	To par	Prize money (US$)
1	(Canada) Brooke Henderson	64-64-68-71=267	−17	1,000,000
2	(United States) Sophia Schubert	69-65-66-68=268	−16	586,262
T3	(Spain) Carlota Ciganda	67-67-67-68=269	−15	283,420
T3	(England) Charley Hull	66-69-67-67=269	−15	283,420
T3	(South Korea) Kim Hyo-joo	68-66-68-67=269	−15	283,420
T3	(New Zealand) Lydia Ko	66-69-68-66=269	−15	283,420
T3	(Japan) Mao Saigo	70-70-65-64=269	−15	283,420
T8	(Sweden) Linn Grant	67-71-69-64=271	−13	124,079
T8	(England) Georgia Hall	69-71-66-65=271	−13	124,079
T8	(South Korea) Kim Sei-young	68-65-68-70=271	−13	124,079
T8	(South Korea) Ko Jin-young	66-69-67-69=271	−13	124,079
T8	(United States) Nelly Korda	64-67-71-69=271	−13	124,079
T8	(South Korea) Ryu So-yeon	67-66-65-73=271	−13	124,079
T8	(Thailand) Atthaya Thitikul	68-66-68-69=271	−13	124,079
