= 2025 International Crown =

Golf tournament

Coordinates: 37.665°N 126.795°E

2025 Hanwha LifePlus International Crown
Tournament information
- Dates: 23–26 October 2025
- Location: Goyang, Gyeonggi Province, Republic of Korea
- Course: New Korea Country Club
- Organized by: LPGA
- Format: Team – match play

Statistics
- Par: 72
- Field: 8 teams, 4 players each
- Cut: 4 teams to Sunday bracket
- Prize fund: $2 million
- Winner's share: $500,000 team ($125,000 per player)

Champion
- Australia

Location in the Republic of Korea

The 2025 Hanwha LifePlus International Crown was a women's golf team event organized by the LPGA, played 23–26 October at New Korea Country Club in Goyang, Gyeonggi Province, Republic of Korea. This was the fifth International Crown, a biennial match play event contested between teams of four players representing seven countries and a world team.

Australia defeated the United States in the final match.

== Format ==
The competition takes place over four days. It features four-ball competition on Thursday, Friday and Saturday. The top two countries from each pool advance to Sunday. Two semifinal matches are played Sunday morning. Each semifinal match consist of two singles matches and one foursomes match. The winning semifinal countries competed in the final match on Sunday afternoon, and a third-place match took place between the two losing semifinal countries. Both matches used the same format as the semifinals.

== Teams ==
After the conclusion of the 2025 Women's British Open, the eight teams and members were announced on 4 August 2025, based on the combined Women's World Golf Rankings of the top four players from each country: Australia, China, Japan, South Korea, Sweden, Thailand, and the United States, plus a World team.

Teams
Seed	Rank	Rank after changes^	Country
1	42	64	United States
2	50	50	Japan
3	56	56	South Korea
4	81	81	Australia
5	96	231	Thailand
6	126	126	Sweden
7	150	150	World team
8	285	334	China

Team members
#1 United States: Rank / Player; 7 / Angel Yin; 14 / Lauren Coughlin; 19 / Lilia Vu; 24 / Yealimi Noh^	#2 Japan: Rank / Player; 6 / Miyū Yamashita; 11 / Rio Takeda; 12 / Mao Saigo; 21 / Ayaka Furue
#3 South Korea: Rank / Player; 8 / Kim Hyo-joo; 9 / Ryu Hae-ran; 16 / Ko Jin-young; 23 / Choi Hye-jin	#4 Australia: Rank / Player; 4 / Minjee Lee; 15 / Hannah Green; 27 / Grace Kim; 35 / Stephanie Kyriacou
#5 Thailand: Rank / Player; 1 / Jeeno Thitikul; 36 / Chanettee Wannasaen; 78 / Pajaree Anannarukarn^; 116 / Jasmine Suwannapura^	#6 Sweden: Rank / Player; 13 / Maja Stark; 31 / Madelene Sagström; 40 / Ingrid Lindblad; 42 / Linn Grant
#7 World team: Rank / Player; 3 / (New Zealand) Lydia Ko; 10 / (England) Charley Hull; 54 / (Canada) Brooke Henderson; 83 / (Chinese Taipei) Hsu Wei-ling	#8 China: Rank / Player; 5 / Yin Ruoning; 99 / Zhang Weiwei; 104 / Liu Yan; 126 / Ruixin Liu^

^Changes:

- for China, Lin Xiyu (ranked 77) could not play due to maternity leave and was replaced by Ruixin Liu (ranked 126).
- for the United States, Nelly Korda (ranked 2) withdrew due to injury and was replaced by Yealimi Noh (ranked 24).
- for Thailand, Patty Tavatanakit (ranked 41) withdrew and was replaced by Pajaree Anannarukarn (ranked 78)
- for Thailand, Ariya Jutanugarn (ranked 18) withdrew due to injury and was replaced by Jasmine Suwannapura (ranked 116)

== Results ==
=== Round one pool play ===
Thursday, October 23, 2025

Pool A
	Results
Lee/Kyriacou	(Australia) 2 up	Wannasaen/Suwannapura
Green/Kim	(Thailand) 1 up	Thitikul/Anannarukarn
1	Session	1

	Results
Noh/Yin	(United States) 5 & 4	Y Liu/Yin
Vu/Coughlin	(United States) 2 up	Zhang/R Liu
2	Session	0

Standings after round one
Seed	Team	Points	Win	Loss	Tie
1	United States	2	2	0	0
4	Australia	1	1	1	0
5	Thailand	1	1	1	0
8	China	0	0	2	0

Pool B
	Results	World team
Yamashita/Takeda	Tied	Hull/Ko
Furue/Saigo	Wld 2 & 1	Henderson/Hsu
0.5	Session	1.5

	Results
Ko/Ryu	Tied	Lindblad/Sagström
Kim/Choi	(South Korea) 3 & 2	Stark/Grant
1.5	Session	0.5

Standings after round one
Seed	Team	Points	Win	Loss	Tie
3	South Korea	1.5	1	0	1
7	World team	1.5	1	0	1
2	Japan	0.5	0	1	1
6	Sweden	0.5	0	1	1

=== Round two pool play ===
Friday, October 24, 2025

Pool A
	Results
Green/Kim	(China) 1 up	R Liu/Yin
Lee/Kyriacou	(Australia) 2 & 1	Y Liu/Zhang
1	Session	1

	Results
Noh/Yin	(United States) 5 & 4	Thitikul/Anannarukarn
Vu/Coughlin	(United States) 3 & 2	Wannasaen/Suwannapura
2	Session	0

Standings after round two
Seed	Team	Points	Win	Loss	Tie
1	United States	4	4	0	0
4	Australia	2	2	2	0
8	China	1	1	3	0
5	Thailand	1	1	3	0

Pool B
	Results
Yamashita/Takeda	(Japan) 3 & 2	Lindblad/Sagström
Furue/Saigo	(Sweden) 3 & 2	Stark/Grant
1	Session	1

	Results	World team
Ko/Ryu	Tied	Henderson/Hsu
Kim/Choi	Wld 1 up	Hull/Ko
0.5	Session	1.5

Standings after round two
Seed	Team	Points	Win	Loss	Tie
7	World team	3	2	0	2
3	South Korea	2	1	1	2
2	Japan	1.5	1	2	1
6	Sweden	1.5	1	2	1

=== Round three pool play ===
Saturday, October 25, 2025

Pool A
	Results
Thitikul/Anannarukarn	(Thailand) 3 & 1	Y Liu/Zhang
Wannasaen/Suwannapura	(China) 2 & 1	R Liu/Yin
1	Session	1

	Results
Noh/Yin	Tied	Lee/Kyriacou
Vu/Coughlin	(United States) 5 & 4	Green/Kim
1.5	Session	0.5

Standings after round two
Seed	Team	Points	Win	Loss	Tie
1	United States	5.5	5	0	1
4	Australia	2.5	2	3	1
8	China	2	2	4	0
5	Thailand	2	2	4	0

Pool B
	Results	World team
Lindblad/Sagström	Wld 4 & 3	Henderson/Hsu
Stark/Grant	(Sweden) 3 & 1	Hull/Ko
1	Session	1

	Results
Furue/Takeda	Tied	Ko/Ryu
Saigo/Yamashita	(Japan) 1 up	Kim/Choi
1.5	Session	0.5

Standings after round two
Seed	Team	Points	Win	Loss	Tie
7	World team	4	3	1	2
2	Japan	3	3	2	3
3	South Korea	2.5	1	2	3
6	Sweden	2.5	2	3	1

=== Finals ===
Sunday, October 26, 2025

Semi final 1
	Results
Yin	(United States) 2 & 1	Takeda
Noh	(United States) 4 & 2	Yamashita
Vu/Coughlin	(Japan) 1 up	Furue/Saigo
2	Session	1

Semi final 2
World team	Results
Hull	Wld 2 & 1	Green
Henderson	(Australia) 1 up	Lee
Hsu/Ko	(Australia) 20 holes	Kyriacou/Kim
1	Session	2

Semi finals
United States	2
Japan	1
World team	1
Australia	2

Final
Australia	2.5
United States	0.5
3rd place match
World team	2
Japan	1

3rd place match
	Results	World team
Furue	Wld 4 & 3	Hull
Takeda	Wld 3 & 2	Ko
Saigo/Yamashita	(Japan) 4 & 3	Hsu/Henderson
1	Session	2

Final
	Results
Yin	(Australia) 2 & 1	Lee
Noh	(Australia) 2 & 1	Green
Vu/Coughlin	Tied	Kyriacou/Kim
0.5	Session	2.5

== Final standings ==
Place	Team	Money ($) (per player)
1st place, gold medalist(s)	Australia	125,000
2nd place, silver medalist(s)	United States	75,900
3rd place, bronze medalist(s)	World team	64,400
4	Japan	55,200
T5	South Korea	40,825
T5	Sweden	40,825
T7	China	33,925
T7	Thailand	33,925
