= Yana Wilson =

American professional golfer (born 2006)

Personal information
- Nationality: United States
- Born: August 22, 2006 (age 20)

Career
- Sport: Golf
- Turned professional: 2024
- Current tour: LPGA Tour
- Former tour: Epson Tour
- Professional wins: 3

Number of wins by tour
- LPGA Tour: 1
- Epson Tour: 2

Best results in LPGA major championships
- Chevron Championship: CUT: 2024
- Women's PGA C'ship: CUT: 2026
- U.S. Women's Open: CUT: 2023
- Women's British Open: T41: 2026
- Evian Championship: CUT: 2024

Yana Wilson (born August 22, 2006) is an American professional golfer who plays on the LPGA Tour.

== Amateur career ==
Wilson had a successful amateur career and won the 2022 U.S. Girls' Junior and played the Augusta National Women's Amateur three times (2022, 2023, 2024). She was runner-up at the 2023 Junior PGA Championship behind Gianna Clemente.

== Professional career ==
Wilson turned professional in 2024 and joined the Epson Tour in 2025, where she won twice and finished second in the season rankings to graduate to the LPGA Tour.

In 2026, she won the Dow Championship together with Gina Kim.

== Amateur wins ==
- 2020 Joanne Winter Arizona Silver Belle Championship
- 2021 Sean Foley Performance Junior Championship
- 2022 Hilton Grand Vacations ANNIKA Invitational, U.S. Girls' Junior
- 2023 IJGT Elite Series #1, Mizuho Americas Open, AJGA Girls Invitational

== Professional wins (3) ==
=== LPGA Tour wins (1) ===
No.	Date	Tournament	Winning score	To par	Margin of victory	Runners-up
1	14 Jun 2026	Dow Championship (with (United States) Gina Kim)	68-63-70-62=263	−17	2 strokes	(South Korea) Kim Hyo-joo and (South Korea) Choi Hye-jin

=== Epson Tour wins (2) ===
- 2025 Reliance Matrix Championship, Dream First Bank Charity Classic

== U.S. national team appearances ==
- Junior Solheim Cup: 2021, 2023
- Junior Ryder Cup: 2023
