= Liu Yan (golfer) =

Chinese professional golfer (born 1997)

Personal information
- Nationality: China
- Born: 7 July 1997 (age 29) Beijing, China
- Height: 6 ft 1 in (185 cm)

Career
- Sport: Golf
- Turned professional: 2017
- Current tour: LPGA Tour
- Former tours: Ladies European Tour; China LPGA Tour; Epson Tour
- Professional wins: 2

Number of wins by tour
- Ladies Asian Golf Tour: 1
- Epson Tour: 1

Best results in LPGA major championships
- Chevron Championship: T4: 2026
- Women's PGA C'ship: T45: 2025
- U.S. Women's Open: T19: 2024
- Women's British Open: T19: 2025
- Evian Championship: T61: 2023

Liu Yan (born 7 July 1997) is a Chinese professional golfer. In 2017, Liu turned professional and joined the Ladies European Tour. In 2023, she joined the LPGA Tour.

== Biography ==
Liu was born in Beijing, China on 7 July 1997. She began playing golf at age 11, after being introduced to the game by her mother, a keen amateur player. At age 19, she turned professional, joining the Ladies European Tour. Liu later admitted she was not ready for the competition, returning to China to compete on the China LPGA Tour. In 2019, she recorded her first professional win, at the 2019 EFG Hong Kong Ladies Open.

Liu joined the Epson Tour in 2020. In 2022, Liu won the Four Winds Invitational, her first win on the Epson Tour. That year, Liu finished ninth in the Epson Tour money list and earned her LPGA Tour card.

During her rookie year on the LPGA Tour, she made a hole-in-one at the 2023 Kroger Queen City Championship and finished T3 at the 2023 ShopRite LPGA Classic. During her rookie season, she golfed in 23 events and made 14 cuts.

During the 2025 Chevron Championship, Liu made an albatross to give her an early lead in the event. The rare feat had only been accomplished 30 times on the LPGA Tour between 1971 and 2023.

== Professional wins (2) ==
=== Ladies Asian Golf Tour wins (1) ===
- 2019 EFG Hong Kong Ladies Open

=== Epson Tour wins (1) ===
- 2022 Four Winds Invitational

== Results in LPGA majors ==
Results not in chronological order.

Tournament	2016	2017	2018	2019	2020	2021	2022	2023	2024	2025	2026
Chevron Championship									CUT	T9	T4
U.S. Women's Open	CUT	CUT		CUT					T19		CUT
Women's PGA Championship								CUT	CUT	T45	T59
The Evian Championship					NT			T61	CUT	CUT	CUT
Women's British Open								CUT		T19	CUT

Top 10
Did not play

CUT = missed the half-way cut
NT = no tournament
T = tied

== Team appearances ==
Professional

- International Crown (representing China): 2025

== See also ==
- List of albatrosses in notable tournaments
