= Casino Del Sol Golf Classic =

Golf tournament in Arizona

Tournament information
- Location: Tucson, Arizona
- Established: 2021
- Course(s): Sewailo Golf Club
- Par: 72
- Length: 6,385 yards (5,838 m)
- Tour(s): Epson Tour
- Format: 72-hole Stroke play
- Prize fund: $250,000
- Month played: May
- Final year: 2024

Final champion
- (United States) Madison Young

The Casino Del Sol Golf Classic was a golf tournament on the Epson Tour, the LPGA's developmental tour. It was part of the Epson Tour's schedule from 2021 to 2024. It was held at Sewailo Golf Club in Tucson, Arizona.

At the inaugural event in 2021, Ruixin Liu trailed by six strokes after 54 holes, but found momentum on the last day's final nine. Making birdies on the last four holes of the day helped Liu finish regulation at 15-under par and tie with Morgane Métraux. On the first playoff hole both players made par, but on the second Liu went right for the flag and secured her win by holing her birdie putt.

== Winners ==
Year	Date	Winner	Country	Score	Margin of victory	Runner(s)-up	Purse ($)	Winner's share ($)
2024	May 4	Madison Young	United States	205 (−11)	1 stroke	(Philippines) Dottie Ardina (Chinese Taipei) Ssu-Chia Cheng (United States) Cydney Clanton (United States) Kaitlin Milligan (Thailand) Pornanong Phatlum (Netherlands) Dewi Weber	250,000	37,500
2023	Mar 2	Gigi Stoll	United States	274 (−14)	1 stroke	(Malaysia) Natasha Andrea Oon	200,000	30,000
2022	Apr 3	Andrea Lee	United States	270 (−18)	Playoff	(United States) Lucy Li	200,000	30,000
2021	Apr 15	Ruixin Liu	China	273 (−15)	Playoff	(Switzerland) Morgane Métraux	200,000	30,000
