= U.S. Women's Amateur Four-Ball =

The U.S. Women's Amateur Four-Ball is a women's amateur team golf tournament conducted by the United States Golf Association (USGA). It was first played in 2015 and replaced the U.S. Women's Amateur Public Links, an individual tournament that was played from 1977 to 2014.

The U.S. Women's Amateur Four-Ball is played by teams of two golfers each with a handicap of 14.4 or less. 64 teams compete in a 36-hole stroke play qualifier that determines the field of 32 teams for match play. Play is conducted using a four-ball format.

The men's counterpart is the U.S. Amateur Four-Ball, also started in 2015.

== Winners ==
Year	Venue	Location	Winners	Runners-up	Ref
2026	Daniel Island Club	Charleston, South Carolina	(United States) Morgan Ellison & (United States) Katie Scheck	(United States) Grace Carter & (United States) Alexandra Snyder	
2025	Oklahoma City Golf & Country Club	Nichols Hills, Oklahoma	(United States) Natalie Yen & (United States) Asia Young	(United States) Athena Singh & (United States) Keira Yun	
2024	Oak Hills Country Club	San Antonio, Texas	(United States) Sarah Lim & (United States) Asterisk Talley	(United States) Brynn Kort & (United States) Gracie McGovern	
2023	The Home Course	DuPont, Washington	(United States) Gianna Clemente & (United States) Avery Zweig	(United States) Tiffany Le & (United States) Kate Villegas	
2022	Grand Reserve Golf Club	Rio Grande, Puerto Rico	(United States) Thienna Huynh & (United States) Sara Im	(United States) Kaitlyn Schroeder & (United States) Bailey Shoemaker	
2021	Maridoe Golf Club	Carrollton, Texas	(United States) Savannah Barber & (Mexico) Alexa Saldaña	(United States) Jillian Bourdage & (United States) Casey Weidenfeld	
2020	Canceled due to the COVID-19 pandemic				
2019	Timuquana Country Club	Jacksonville, Florida	(United States) Megan Furtney & (United States) Erica Shepherd	(United States) Jillian Bourdage & (United States) Casey Weidenfeld	
2018	El Caballero Country Club	Tarzana, California	(United States) Katrina Prendergast & (United States) Ellen Secor	(Chinese Taipei) Yuchan Chang & (China) Lei Ye	
2017	The Dunes Golf and Beach Club	Myrtle Beach, South Carolina	(United States) Alice Chen & (United States) Taylor Totland	(United States) Jennifer Chang & (United States) Gina Kim	
2016	Streamsong Resort, Blue Course	Bowling Green, Florida	(United States) Hailee Cooper & (United States) Kaitlyn Papp	(United States) Angelina Kim & (United States) Brianna Navarrosa	
2015	Bandon Dunes Golf Resort, Pacific Dunes Course	Bandon, Oregon	(United States) Mika Liu & (United States) Rinko Mitsunaga	(United States) Hannah O'Sullivan & (United States) Robynn Ree	

== Future sites ==
Year	Edition	Course	Location	Dates	Previous championships hosted
2027	12th	Farmington Country Club	Charlottesville, Virginia	May 15–19	
2028	13th	Blessings Golf Club	Johnson, Arkansas	May 13–17	
2029	14th	Desert Mountain Club	Scottsdale, Arizona	May 12–16	
2030	15th	Erin Hills	Erin, Wisconsin	May 18–22	
2031	16th	Old Barnwell	Aiken, South Carolina	TBD	
2035	20th	Country Club of York	York, Pennsylvania	May 19–23	
2037	22nd	Bandon Dunes Golf Resort	Bandon, Oregon	TBD	2015
