= Yin Ruoning =

Chinese professional golfer (born 2002)

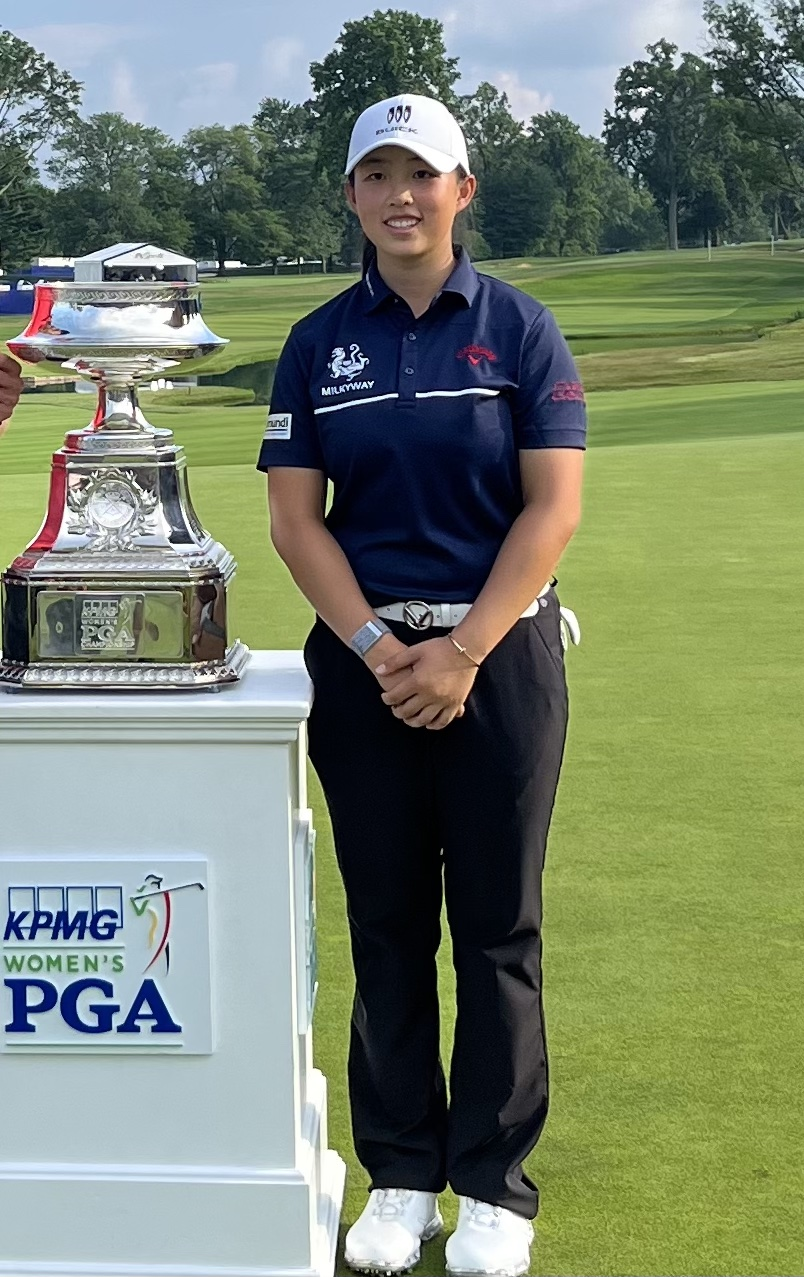
- Yin with 2023 KPMG Women's PGA Championship trophy

Personal information
- Nickname: Ronni
- Nationality: China
- Born: 28 September 2002 (age 24) Kunming, China

Career
- Sport: Golf
- Turned professional: 2020
- Current tour: LPGA Tour (joined 2022)
- Former tour: China LPGA Tour (joined 2020)
- Professional wins: 10

Number of wins by tour
- LPGA Tour: 7
- Other: 3

Best results in LPGA major championships (wins: 1)
- Chevron Championship: T2: 2025, 2026
- Women's PGA C'ship: Won: 2023
- U.S. Women's Open: T4: 2025
- Women's British Open: T2: 2024
- Evian Championship: T26: 2026
Medal record
Women's golf
Representing China
Asian Games
Bronze medal – third place	2018 Jakarta–Palembang	Women's team
Bronze medal – third place	2022 Hangzhou	Women's team
Silver medal – second place	2026 Aichi–Nagoya	Women's individual
Gold medal – first place	2026 Aichi–Nagoya	Women's team

Yin Ruoning (born 28 September 2002) is a Chinese professional golfer who plays on the U.S.-based LPGA Tour. At age 20, she won the 2023 Women's PGA Championship becoming the second women's major championship winner from China. Yin rose to number one in the Women's World Golf Rankings in September 2023.

== Early life ==
Yin was born in Kunming, Yunnan province, China. Yin began to learn how to play golf when she was 10 and a half years old. She is known by her nickname Ronni. Her father's hometown is Shanghai.

== Amateur career ==
At 16, she represented the Chinese women's national team at the 2018 Asian Games in Jakarta, where she earned a bronze medal in the women's team event together with Liu Wenbo and Du Mohan. She also represented her country at the 2018 Espirito Santo Trophy, where her team finished fourth among 57 nations, behind United States, Japan and South Korea.

Yin won nine titles as a junior amateur in 2019, including the National Amateur Championship, and reached a career-high of 64th in the World Amateur Golf Rankings.

== Professional career ==
Yin turned professional in 2020. She won the China LPGA Tour Qualifying Tournament and joined the China LPGA Tour, where she won her first three events in a row. She received two Guinness World Records titles, the most consecutive wins on the China LPGA Tour, and the most consecutive wins on the China LPGA Tour from professional debut records.

She finished tied fourth at the LPGA Q-Series to earn a LPGA Tour membership for 2022. In her rookie season, she made just two cuts in her first nine starts, but ended the season with seven cuts in 16 events. She recorded a season-best tie 4th at the Dana Open, having led the event after a first-round 65.

Yin won the 2023 DIO Implant LA Open one stroke ahead of Georgia Hall, becoming the second Chinese winner on the LPGA Tour after Shanshan Feng.

On 25 June 2023, at 20 years of age, Yin captured her first major championship by winning the KPMG Women’s PGA Championship at Baltusrol Golf Club, Springfield, New Jersey, by one shot after making a birdie on the last hole. In September that year, she became the new world number one.

In October 2024, Yin achieved her third win of the 2024 season and her fifth championship since 2022 at the Maybank Championship just two weeks after winning the Buick LPGA Shanghai.

At the 2025 Chevron Championship, Yin was one of five players to compete in a playoff after 72 holes, where she had a makeable putt in the playoff for the win, but three-putted and was beaten by winner Mao Saigo. Yin finished T4th in the 2025 U.S. Women's Open, three-strokes behind winner Maja Stark.

She won the 2026 FM Championship, after sealing a two-stroke victory. She was level with Kim Hyo-joo after twelve holes of the final round, but five straight pars followed by a birdie on the 18th hole secured her success.

== Amateur wins ==
- 2019 China Amateur Golf Open Leg 3, Buick National Junior Classic Leg 5, Super Lychee Amateur Golf Future Tour 3, National Amateur Championship, Super Lychee Amateur Golf Future Tour 4, China Amateur Golf Open Leg 6, China Amateur Golf Open Leg 7, Super Lychee Amateur Golf Future Tour 6, China Junior Masters

== Professional wins (10) ==
=== LPGA Tour wins (7) ===
Legend
Major championships (1)
Other LPGA Tour (5)

No.	Date	Tournament	Winning score	To par	Margin of victory	Runner(s)-up	Winner's share ($)
1	2 Apr 2023	DIO Implant LA Open	65-69-67-70=269	−15	1 stroke	(England) Georgia Hall	262,500
2	25 Jun 2023	KPMG Women's PGA Championship	67-73-69-67=276	−8	1 stroke	(Japan) Yuka Saso	1,500,000
3	30 Jun 2024	Dow Championship (with (Thailand) Atthaya Thitikul)	64-66-66-62=258	−22	1 stroke	(United States) Ally Ewing and (United States) Jennifer Kupcho	366,082 (each)
4	13 Oct 2024	Buick LPGA Shanghai	62-66-69-67=264	−25	6 strokes	(Japan) Mao Saigo (South Korea) Kim Sei-young	315,000
5	27 Oct 2024	Maybank Championship	67-67-66-65=265	–23	1 stroke	(Thailand) Atthaya Thitikul	450,000
6	30 Aug 2026	FM Championship	71-65-68-70=274	−14	2 strokes	(South Korea) Kim Hyo-joo	660,000
7	18 Oct 2026	Buick LPGA Shanghai (2)^{1}	68-74-67-68=277	−11	1 stroke	(South Korea) Choi Hye-jin	480,000

^{1}Co-sanctioned by the China LPGA Tour

LPGA Tour playoff record (0–1)

No.	Year	Tournament	Opponents	Result
1	2025	Chevron Championship	(United States) Lindy Duncan (Thailand) Ariya Jutanugarn (South Korea) Kim Hyo-joo (Japan) Mao Saigo	Saigo won with birdie on first extra hole

=== China LPGA Tour wins (5) ===
- 2020 (3) Zhuhai Guowei Centre Plaza Hollywood Mansion Challenge, Moutai Golf Liquor Zhuhai Golden Gulf Challenge, Mitsubishi Heavy Industries Orient Masters
- 2024 (1) Buick LPGA Shanghai^{1}
- 2026 (1) Buick LPGA Shanghai^{1}

^{1}Co-sanctioned by the LPGA Tour

== Major championships ==
=== Wins (1) ===
Year	Championship	54 holes	Winning score	Margin	Runner-up
2023	Women's PGA Championship	3 stroke deficit	−8 (67-73-69-67=276)	1 stroke	(Japan) Yuka Saso

=== Results timeline ===
Results not in chronological order

Tournament	2021	2022	2023	2024	2025	2026
Chevron Championship			T41	T23	T2	T2
U.S. Women's Open	CUT		T20	T12	T4	T8
Women's PGA Championship		CUT	1	T24	T23	T37
The Evian Championship			CUT		CUT	T26
Women's British Open			T61	T2	CUT	CUT

Win
Top 10
Did not play

CUT = missed the half-way cut
WD = withdrew
NT = no tournament
T = tied

=== Summary ===
Tournament	Wins	2nd	3rd	Top-5	Top-10	Top-25	Events	Cuts made
Chevron Championship	0	2	0	2	2	3	4	4
U.S. Women's Open	0	0	0	1	2	4	5	4
Women's PGA Championship	1	0	0	1	1	3	5	4
The Evian Championship	0	0	0	0	0	0	3	1
Women's British Open	0	1	0	1	1	1	4	2
Totals	1	3	0	5	6	11	21	15

- Most consecutive cuts made – 8 (2023 Women's British – 2025 Women's PGA)
- Longest streak of top-10s – 3 (2024 Women's British – 2025 U.S. Women's Open)

== LPGA Tour career summary ==
Year	Tournaments played	Cuts made*	Wins	2nd	3rd	Top 10s	Best finish	Earnings ($)	Money list rank	Scoring average	Scoring rank
2022	16	7	0	0	0	1	T4	170,140	99	70.93	43
2023	21	19	2	0	4	9	1	2,894,677	4	69.95	6
2024	20	18	3	1	0	7	1	2,783,307	7	70.10	5
2025	16	14	0	2	0	3	T2	1,569,149	21	70.64	31
2026	17	15	1	2		7	1	2,553,624	3	70.18	6
Totals^	90	74	6	5	4	27	1	9,970,897	33		

^ Official as of 30 August 2026
*Includes matchplay and other tournaments without a cut.

== World ranking ==
Position in Women's World Golf Rankings at the end of each calendar year.

Year	Ranking	Source
2018	586	
2019	482	
2020	290	
2021	405	
2022	151	
2023	2	
2024	2	
2025	7	
2026	5^	

^ As of 31 August 2026

== Team appearances ==
Amateur

- Espirito Santo Trophy (representing China): 2018

Professional

- International Crown (representing China): 2023, 2025
