= Amiyu Ozeki =

Japanese professional golfer (born 2003)

Amiyu Ozeki 尾関 彩美悠
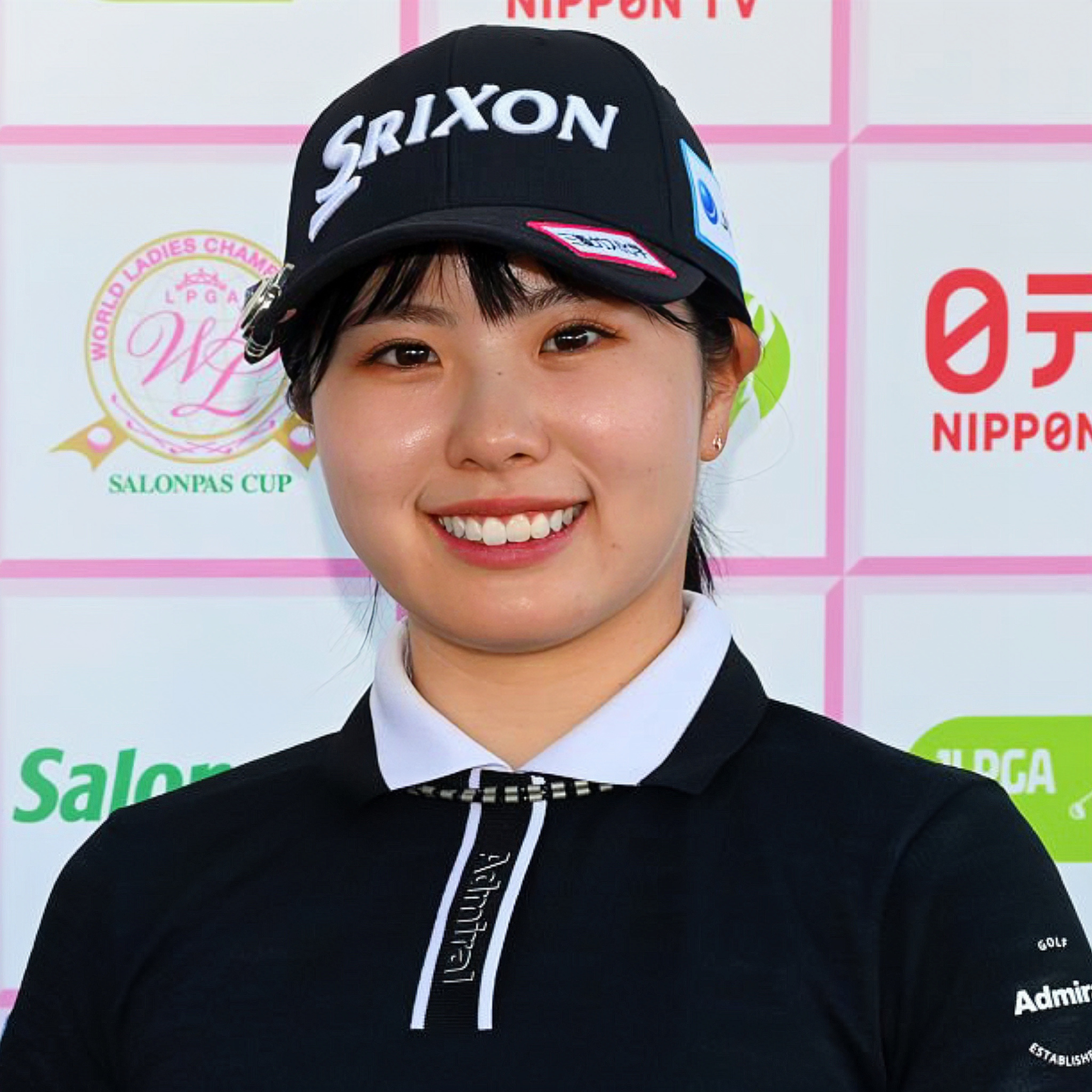
- May 2025

Personal information
- Nationality: Japan
- Born: 16 June 2003 (age 23) Kurashiki, Okayama Prefecture, Japan
- Height: 158 cm (5 ft 2 in)

Career
- Sport: Golf
- Turned professional: 2022
- Current tour: LPGA of Japan Tour
- Professional wins: 1

Number of wins by tour
- LPGA of Japan Tour: 1

Best results in LPGA major championships
- Chevron Championship: DNP
- Women's PGA C'ship: DNP
- U.S. Women's Open: T36: 2024
- Women's British Open: DNP
- Evian Championship: DNP

Amiyu Ozeki (Japanese: 尾関 彩美悠, Hepburn: Ozeki Amiyu) (born 16 June 2003) is a Japanese professional golfer. She plays on the LPGA of Japan Tour where she has one win.

== Career ==
Ozeki captured the 2022 Sumitomo Life Vitality Ladies Tokai Classic for her maiden win on the JLPGA.

== Professional wins (1) ==
=== LPGA of Japan Tour wins (1) ===
No.	Date	Tournament	Winning score	To par	Margin of victory	Runner(s)-up
1	18 Sep 2022	Sumitomo Life Vitality Ladies Tokai Classic	67-66-70=203	−13	1 stroke	(Japan) Yuri Yoshida
