= Mission Inn Resort and Club Championship =

Golf tournament in Florida

Tournament information
- Location: Howey-in-the-Hills, Florida
- Established: 2020
- Courses: Mission Inn Resort & Club
- Par: 73
- Length: 6,735 yards (6,158 m)
- Tour: Epson Tour
- Format: Stroke play
- Prize fund: $200,000
- Month played: May
- Final year: 2023

Final champion
- (United States) Gina Kim

The Mission Inn Resort and Club Championship was a tournament on the Epson Tour, the LPGA's developmental tour, from 2020 to 2023. It was held at Mission Inn Resort & Club in Howey-in-the-Hills, Florida.

Tournament names through the years:

- 2020-2021 Mission Inn Resort and Club Championship
- 2022–2023 Inova Mission Inn Resort and Club Championship

== Winners ==
Year	Date	Winner	Country	Score	Margin of victory	Runner(s)-up	Purse ($)	Winner's share ($)
2023	May 28	Jeon Ji-won	South Korea	209 (−10)	1 stroke	(Malaysia) Alyaa Abdulghany (United States) Lindy Duncan	200,000	30,000
2022	May 29	Gina Kim	United States	208 (−11)	2 strokes	(Mexico) María Fassi (United States) Caroline Inglis	200,000	30,000
2021	May 30	Min Lee	Chinese Taipei	211 (−8)	1 stroke	(Israel) Laetitia Beck (United States) Savannah Vilaubi	200,000	30,000
2020	Oct 17	Matilda Castren	Finland	207 (−12)	5 strokes	(Sweden) Linnea Johansson	125,000	18,750
