= Elizabeth Szokol =

American professional golfer (born 1995)

Personal information
- Nationality: United States
- Born: June 17, 1995 (age 31) Winnetka, Illinois, U.S.
- Height: 5 ft 7 in (1.70 m)

Career
- Sport: Golf
- College: Northwestern University; University of Virginia
- Turned professional: 2017
- Former tours: LPGA Tour; Symetra Tour
- Professional wins: 2

Number of wins by tour
- LPGA Tour: 1
- Epson Tour: 1

Best results in LPGA major championships
- Chevron Championship: T30: 2025
- Women's PGA C'ship: T48: 2020
- U.S. Women's Open: CUT: 2021, 2024
- Women's British Open: T26: 2021
- Evian Championship: T29: 2021

Elizabeth Nicole Szokol (born June 17, 1995) is an American professional golfer who played on the LPGA Tour.

== Early life, college and amateur career ==
Szokol grew up in Winnetka, Illinois, a Chicago suburb. An injury-prone athlete, she experienced her first knee surgery at age 12 after playing softball and tennis. The injury downtime helped her discover golf, which she took up at 14. She led her high school team to the 2010 Illinois State Championship. In 2012 she became the Illinois Women's Amateur Champion.

Szokol attended Northwestern University between 2012 and 2014. In her sophomore year she made the Academic All-Big Ten and the Second Team All-Big Ten. At the 2013 Big Ten Championships, she helped the Wildcats tie for first and claim a share of the first Big Ten Conference title in program history. For her junior year she transferred to the University of Virginia and continued excelling, named to the Atlantic Coast Conference Women's Golf All-Academic Team her senior year.

== Professional career ==
Szokol turned professional in 2017 and joined the Symetra Tour. In her rookie season she recorded six top-10 finishes including a runner-up result at the Four Winds Invitational. In 2018, she recorded seven top-10 finishes including her first professional victory at the IOA Invitational, where she finished 4 strokes ahead of Pajaree Anannarukarn in second place. She finished fourth on the Symetra Tour Official Money List to earn membership for the LPGA Tour for the 2019 season.

In her rookie year on the LPGA Tour she made 10 cuts in 20 starts. Her best finish was a tie for sixth at the Aberdeen Standard Investments Ladies Scottish Open.

In 2021, she recorded three top-10 finishes including a runner-up at the Marathon Classic in Ohio, and 3rd at the Cognizant Founders Cup in New Jersey, after which she rose into the top-100 in the Women's World Golf Rankings for the first time. She finished the season 44th on the LPGA Tour Money List.

Szokol announced her retirement from the LPGA Tour after missing the cut at The Annika tournament in November 2025.

== Amateur wins ==
- 2012 Illinois Women's Amateur Champion
- 2016 NCAA Stanford Regional

== Professional wins (2) ==
=== LPGA Tour wins (1) ===
No.	Date	Tournament	Winning score	To par	Margin of victory	Runners-up
1	Jul 22, 2023	Dow Great Lakes Bay Invitational (with (United States) Cheyenne Knight)	69-61-62-65=257	−23	1 stroke	(Finland) Matilda Castren and (Malaysia) Kelly Tan

=== Symetra Tour wins (1) ===
No.	Date	Tournament	Winning score	Margin of victory	Runners-up
1	May 6, 2018	IOA Invitational	−4 (71-73-68=212)	4 strokes	(Thailand) Pajaree Anannarukarn

== Results in LPGA majors ==
Results not in chronological order.

Tournament	2019	2020	2021	2022	2023	2024	2025
Chevron Championship		CUT			CUT	CUT	T30
U.S. Women's Open			CUT			CUT	
Women's PGA Championship	CUT	T48	CUT	T54	T71	T52	CUT
The Evian Championship		NT	T29		T54	T60	
Women's British Open		T32	T26				CUT

Did not play

CUT = missed the half-way cut
NT = no tournament
T = tied

=== Summary ===
Tournament	Wins	2nd	3rd	Top-5	Top-10	Top-25	Events	Cuts made
Chevron Championship	0	0	0	0	0	0	4	1
U.S. Women's Open	0	0	0	0	0	0	2	0
Women's PGA Championship	0	0	0	0	0	0	7	3
The Evian Championship	0	0	0	0	0	0	3	3
Women's British Open	0	0	0	0	0	0	3	2
Totals	0	0	0	0	0	0	19	9

== LPGA Tour career summary ==
Year	Tournaments played	Cuts made*	Wins	2nd	3rd	Top 10s	Best finish	Earnings ($)	Money list rank	Scoring average	Scoring rank
2019	20	10	0	0	0	1	T6	105,814	108	71.91	91
2020	14	7	0	0	0	0	11	110,873	83	72.26	79
2021	23	13	0	1	1	3	T2	530,570	39	71.52	78
2022	13	6	0	0	0	1	T4	131,874	108	71.83	95
2023	20	13	1	0	0	3	1	536,094	55	71.81	90
2024	22	12	0	0	0	0	T30	165,358	107	72.31	115
2025	17	11	0	0	0	1	T10	230,337	99	71.75	92
Totals^	129	69	1	1	1	9	1	1,810,920	237		

^ Official as of 2025 season
* Includes matchplay and other tournaments without a cut.

== World ranking ==
Position in Women's World Golf Rankings at the end of each calendar year.

Year	World ranking	Source
2017	479	
2018	332	
2019	270	
2020	204	
2021	83	
2022	149	
2023	207	
2024	245	
2025	254	
