= Gianna Clemente =

American professional golfer (born 2002)

Personal information
- Nationality: United States
- Born: March 28, 2008 (age 18) Warren, Ohio, U.S.

Career
- Sport: Golf
- Turned professional: 2025
- Current tour: Epson Tour (joined 2026)

Best results in LPGA major championships
- Chevron Championship: 71st: 2025
- Women's PGA C'ship: DNP
- U.S. Women's Open: DNP
- Women's British Open: DNP
- Evian Championship: CUT: 2025

Achievements and awards
- AJGA Girls Player of the Year: 2024

Gianna Clemente (born March 28, 2008) is an American professional golfer. She won the 2023 U.S. Women's Amateur Four-Ball and was low amateur at the 2025 Chevron Championship.

== Early life and amateur career ==
A golf prodigy, Clemente began playing golf at the age of 2 and started competing at the age of 5. In 2022, at 14, she was runner-up at the U.S. Girls' Junior and at the Rolex Junior Championship. In 2023, she won the Junior PGA Championship and the U.S. Women's Amateur Four-Ball with Avery Zweig. In 2024, she reached the semi-finals of the U.S. Girls' Junior, and won the amateur event at the Mizuho Americas Open. She tied for 5th at the Augusta National Women's Amateur, and was named AJGA Girls Player of the Year.

At just 14 years old, she Monday qualified for the CPKC Women's Open, Dana Open and Kroger Queen City Championship on the 2022 LPGA Tour.

In 2025, she lost a five-hole playoff at the Guardian Championship on the Epson Tour, to Melanie Green. She was low amateur at the 2025 Chevron Championship.

== Professional career ==
In 2025, at 17, Clemente entered the LPGA Qualifying Tournament and turned professional, securing Epson Tour status for 2026.

== Amateur wins ==
- 2020 College Prep Series at Kent State, Coca Cola Junior Championship
- 2021 College Prep Series at Kent State, Kansas Girls Junior Amateur, AJGA Junior at Big Sky, The PING Invitational
- 2022 Huntsville Junior Open, College Prep Series at Kent State, The PING Invitational
- 2023 The Sally, Junior PGA Championship, U.S. Women's Amateur Four-Ball (with Avery Zweig)
- 2024 Mizuho Americas Open

== Playoff record ==
Epson Tour playoff record (0–1)

No.	Year	Tournament	Opponents	Result
1	2025	Guardian Championship	(United States) Melanie Green	Lost to par on fifth extra hole

== U.S. national team appearances ==
Amateur

- Junior Ryder Cup: 2023
- Junior Solheim Cup: 2023, 2024 (winners)
- Junior Golf World Cup: 2025
