= Mao Saigo =

Japanese professional golfer

Mao Saigo 西郷 真央
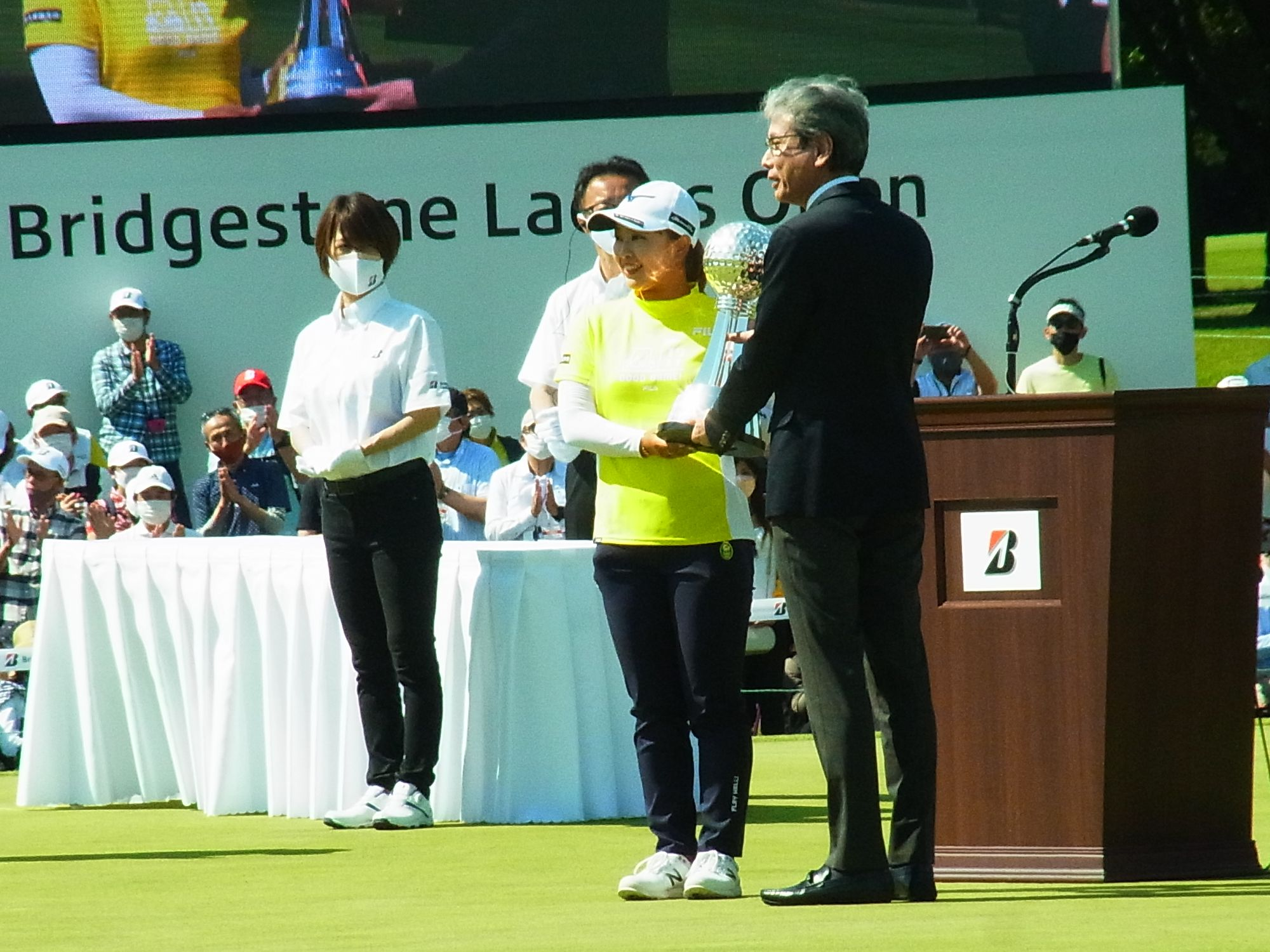

Personal information
- Nationality: Japan
- Born: 8 October 2001 (age 25) Funabashi, Chiba, Japan
- Height: 159 cm (5 ft 3 in)

Career
- Sport: Golf
- College: Nihon Wellness Sports University
- Turned professional: 2019
- Current tours: LPGA of Japan Tour (joined 2020); LPGA Tour
- Professional wins: 7

Number of wins by tour
- LPGA Tour: 1
- LPGA of Japan Tour: 6

Best results in LPGA major championships (wins: 1)
- Chevron Championship: Won: 2025
- Women's PGA C'ship: T7: 2024
- U.S. Women's Open: T4: 2025
- Women's British Open: T7: 2024
- Evian Championship: T3: 2022

Achievements and awards
- LPGA Tour Rookie of the Year: 2024

Mao Saigo (西郷 真央, Saigo Mao) (born 8 October 2001) is a Japanese professional golfer. She plays on the LPGA of Japan Tour where she won three of the first five tournaments of the 2022 season, and the LPGA Tour.

== Career ==
Saigo was born in Funabashi in Greater Tokyo and won the Japan Women's Amateur Championship in 2019.

She turned professional and joined the LPGA of Japan Tour in 2020. In 2021, she was runner-up seven times to finish 4th on the 2020–21 money list.

In the 2022 season, she recorded three wins and two second place finishes in the first six tournaments, after which she rose to 18th in the Women's World Golf Rankings.

Saigo finished second at the LPGA Final Qualifying Tournament in 2023 to earn her LPGA Tour card for 2024. In 2024, she had seven top-10 finishes including runner-up finishes at the CPKC Women's Open and Buick LPGA Shanghai. She earned LPGA Rookie of the Year honors. In 2025, she won the Chevron Championship for her first LPGA Tour win and first major championship win.

== Amateur wins ==
- 2019 Japan Women's Amateur Championship

== Professional wins (7) ==
=== LPGA Tour wins (1) ===
Legend
Major championships (1)
Other LPGA Tour (0)

No.	Date	Tournament	Winning score	To par	Margin of victory	Runners-up
1	27 Apr 2025	Chevron Championship	70-68-69-74=281	−7	Playoff	(United States) Lindy Duncan (Thailand) Ariya Jutanugarn (South Korea) Kim Hyo-joo (China) Yin Ruoning

LPGA Tour playoff record (1–0)

No.	Year	Tournament	Opponents	Result
1	2025	Chevron Championship	(United States) Lindy Duncan (Thailand) Ariya Jutanugarn (South Korea) Kim Hyo-joo (China) Yin Ruoning	Won with birdie on first extra hole

=== LPGA of Japan Tour wins (6) ===
No.	Date	Tournament	Winning score	To par	Margin of victory	Runner-up
1	6 Mar 2022	Daikin Orchid Ladies Golf Tournament	69-73-69-67=278	−10	1 stroke	(South Korea) Hwang Ah-reum
2	27 Mar 2022	AXA Ladies Golf Tournament in Miyazaki	67-68=135^	−9	1 stroke	(Japan) Miyū Yamashita
3	3 Apr 2022	Yamaha Ladies Open Katsuragi	67-69-68-76=280	−8	1 stroke	(Japan) Kotone Hori
4	1 May 2022	Panasonic Open Ladies Golf Tournament	70-68-68=208	−10	2 stroke	(Taiwan) Teresa Lu
5	22 May 2022	Bridgestone Ladies Open	67-70-69-69=275	−13	2 stroke	(Japan) Mone Inami
6	12 Nov 2023	Ito En Ladies Golf Tournament	69-63-68=200	−16	3 stroke	(Japan) Ayako Kimura

^Tournament shortened due to adverse conditions.

== Major championships ==
=== Wins (1) ===
Year	Championship	54 holes	Winning score	Margin	Runners-up
2025	Chevron Championship	Co-leader	−7 (70-68-69-74=281)	Playoff^{1}	(United States) Lindy Duncan, (South Korea) Kim Hyo-joo, (China) Ruoning Yin, (Thailand) Ariya Jutanugarn

^{1} Defeated Duncan, Kim, Yin and Jutanugarn with a birdie on the first hole of a sudden death playoff.

=== Results timeline ===
Results not in chronological order.

Tournament	2022	2023	2024	2025	2026
Chevron Championship		65	CUT	1	T59
U.S. Women's Open	T44	T33	CUT	T4	59
Women's PGA Championship	T30	CUT	T7	CUT	T32
The Evian Championship	T3	CUT	T35	T38	T4
Women's British Open	CUT	T36	T7	T11	T23

Win
Top 10
Did not play

CUT = missed the half-way cut
T = tied

=== Summary ===
Tournament	Wins	2nd	3rd	Top-5	Top-10	Top-25	Events	Cuts made
Chevron Championship	1	0	0	1	1	1	4	3
U.S. Women's Open	0	0	0	1	1	1	5	4
Women's PGA Championship	0	0	0	0	1	1	5	3
The Evian Championship	0	0	1	2	2	2	5	4
Women's British Open	0	0	0	0	1	3	5	4
Totals	1	0	1	4	6	8	24	18

- Most consecutive cuts made – 7 (2025 Evian – 2026 Women's British Open, current)
- Longest streak of top-10s – 3 (2024 Women's British Open – 2025 U.S. Women's Open)

== Team appearances ==
Professional

- International Crown (representing Japan): 2025
