= FM Championship =

Golf tournament

Tournament information
- Location: Norton, Massachusetts, U.S.
- Established: 2024
- Course: TPC Boston
- Par: 72
- Length: 6,598 yards (6,033 m)
- Tour: LPGA Tour
- Format: Stroke play – 72 holes
- Prize fund: $4.1 million
- Month played: August

Tournament record score
- Aggregate: 268 Wang Xinying
- To par: −20 as above

Current champion
- (China) Yin Ruoning

Location map
- Location in the United States Location in Massachusetts

The FM Championship is a women's professional golf tournament in Massachusetts on the LPGA Tour. A new event in 2024, it is played at TPC Boston in Norton near Boston.

Ryu Hae-ran of South Korea won the inaugural tournament in a playoff against Ko Jin-young with a par on the first extra hole.

== Winners ==
Year	Date	Champion	Country	Winning score	To par	Margin of victory	Purse ($)	Winner's share ($)	Ref
2026	Aug 30	Yin Ruoning	China	71-65-6870=274	−14	2 strokes	4,400,000	660,000	
2025	Aug 31	Wang Xinying	China	66-67-65-70=268	−20	1 stroke	4,100,000	615,000	
2024	Sep 1	Ryu Hae-ran	South Korea	69-62-78-64=273	−15	Playoff	3,800,000	570,000	
