= Lindy Duncan =

American professional golfer (born 1991)

Personal information
- Nationality: United States
- Born: January 16, 1991 (age 35) Fort Lauderdale, Florida, U.S.
- Height: 5 ft 6 in (1.68 m)

Career
- Sport: Golf
- College: Duke University
- Turned professional: 2013
- Current tour: LPGA Tour (joined 2014)
- Former tour: Epson Tour (joined 2013)
- Professional wins: 1

Number of wins by tour
- LPGA Tour: 1

Best results in LPGA major championships
- Chevron Championship: T2: 2025
- Women's PGA C'ship: T15: 2018
- U.S. Women's Open: T15: 2013
- Women's British Open: T46: 2025
- Evian Championship: T22: 2018

Achievements and awards
- NGCA National Player of the Year: 2012
- ACC Player of the Year: 2010, 2011, 2012
- ACC Rookie of the Year: 2010
- Heather Farr Player Award: 2025

Lindy Duncan (born January 16, 1991) is an American professional golfer and LPGA Tour player. In November 2026, she won The ANNIKA, her first victory in 222 starts on the LPGA Tour.

== Early life, college and amateur career ==
Duncan grew up in Fort Lauderdale, Florida and attended American Heritage School. She started playing golf at the age of 9 and had a successful amateur and college career, reaching the semi-finals in the 2006 U.S. Women's Amateur at the age of 15. In 2009, the same year she graduated high school, she qualified for the U.S. Women's Open, and advanced to match play at the U.S. Women's Amateur for the fourth straight year, placing fifth in stroke-play qualifying.

Duncan played collegiate golf at Duke University from 2009 to 2013 where she was a four-time first team All-American, recorded six wins, and was named 2010 ACC Rookie of the Year. She was named ACC Player of the Year in 2010, 2011 and 2012, and also NGCA National Player of the Year in 2012.

In 2011, she made the cut in the U.S. Women's Open at The Broadmoor after she was tied 5th after the first round, two strokes off the lead. She was runner-up with the Duke Blue Devils women's golf team and individually at the 2013 NCAA Division I Women's Golf Championship, behind Annie Park. She was selected to represent the United States at the 2012 Curtis Cup and 2013 Copa de las Americas.

== Professional career ==
Duncan turned professional in June 2013 after graduating and joined the Symetra Tour, where she recorded three top-10 finishes in seven events in her rookie season. She finished tied 15th in the 2013 U.S. Women's Open. Duncan earned conditional status for the 2014 LPGA Tour at Q-School but only played one event. In 2015, she was runner-up at the FireKeepers Casino Hotel Championship and finished tied 15th at the Final LPGA Qualifying Tournament and joined the LPGA Tour full-time for the 2016 season.

In 2017, Duncan recorded the first two top-10 finishes of her LPGA Tour career, including a fourth place at the Manulife LPGA Classic. In 2018, she had her best LPGA season to date, recording three top-10s, including a runner-up finish at the Volunteers of America LPGA Texas Classic, where she birdied her final three holes for a 64, the low round of the tournament, but Park Sung-hyun chipped in on the final hole to win. Duncan finished 42nd on the money list after also making some of her best major appearances, finishing tied 15th at the KPMG Women's PGA Championship and tied 22nd at The Evian Championship.

In 2023, Duncan recorded a solo third-place finish at the Dana Open and was runner-up at the Inova Mission Inn Resort & Club Championship in one of two Epson Tour starts that season.

In 2025, Duncan won the Heather Farr Player Award.

== Amateur wins ==
- 2010 Dixie Amateur, Liz Murphey Collegiate Classic
- 2011 LSU Golf Classic, Mason Rudolph Championship
- 2012 Northrop Grumman Regional Women's Challenge, Bryan National Collegiate Championship, ACC Championship

== Professional wins (1) ==
=== LPGA Tour wins (1) ===
No.	Date	Tournament	Winning score	To par	Margin of victory	Runner-up
1	Nov 15, 2026	The ANNIKA	62-66-69-67=264	−16	2 strokes	(South Korea) Choi Hye-jin

LPGA Tour playoff record (0–1)

No.	Year	Tournament	Opponents	Result
1	2025	Chevron Championship	(Thailand) Ariya Jutanugarn (South Korea) Kim Hyo-joo (Japan) Mao Saigo (China) Yin Ruoning	Saigo won with birdie on first extra hole

== Results in LPGA majors ==
Results not in chronological order.

Tournament	2009	2010	2011	2012	2013	2014	2015	2016	2017	2018	2019	2020	2021	2022	2023	2024	2025	2026
Chevron Championship					CUT					T48	CUT					T60	T2	CUT
U.S. Women's Open	CUT		T59		T15					63	T26			T59			CUT	CUT
Women's PGA Championship								T50	T59	T15	CUT	T44	CUT			T41	T31	CUT
The Evian Championship ^								CUT	CUT	T22	CUT	NT	CUT			T60	WD	CUT
Women's British Open									CUT	CUT	CUT	CUT		T56			T46	T61

^ The Evian Championship was added as a major in 2013.

Top 10
Did not play

CUT = missed the half-way cut
WD = withdrew
T = tied
NT = no tournament

=== Summary ===
Tournament	Wins	2nd	3rd	Top-5	Top-10	Top-25	Events	Cuts made
Chevron Championship	0	1	0	1	1	1	6	3
U.S. Women's Open	0	0	0	0	0	1	8	5
Women's PGA Championship	0	0	0	0	0	1	9	6
The Evian Championship	0	0	0	0	0	1	8	3
Women's British Open	0	0	0	0	0	0	7	3
Totals	0	1	0	1	1	4	38	20

- Most consecutive cuts made – 6 (2022 U.S. Women's Open – 2025 Chevron)
- Longest streak of top-10s – 1 (once)

== U.S. national team appearances ==
Amateur

- Curtis Cup: 2012

Professional

- Solheim Cup: 2026
