= Sophia Schubert =

American professional golfer (born 1996)

Personal information
- Nationality: United States
- Born: January 31, 1996 (age 30) Knoxville, Tennessee, U.S.
- Height: 5 ft 6 in (168 cm)

Career
- Sport: Golf
- College: Auburn University; University of Texas
- Turned professional: 2018
- Current tour: LPGA Tour
- Former tour: Epson Tour
- Professional wins: 1

Number of wins by tour
- Epson Tour: 1

Best results in LPGA major championships
- Chevron Championship: CUT: 2018, 2023, 2026
- Women's PGA C'ship: T65: 2022
- U.S. Women's Open: CUT: 2018
- Women's British Open: CUT: 2022
- Evian Championship: 2nd: 2022

Sophia Marie Schubert (born January 31, 1996) is an American professional golfer.

== Personal life and education ==
Schubert is from Oak Ridge, Tennessee. She began playing golf at the age of four when her mother registered her and her sister for golf lessons. She majored in Sports management at the University of Texas.

In 2022 she began taking flying lessons at the McGhee Tyson Airport, her goal being to obtain her pilot's license in order to fly herself to tournaments, similarly to Arnold Palmer and Peggy Kirk Bell.

== Amateur career ==
She competed for the Christian Academy of Knoxville and Auburn during her freshman year in college before transferring to the University of Texas. While at Texas she competed for the Texas Longhorns and became the first Longhorn to win the U.S. Women's Amateur since Kelli Kuehne in 1996. Schubert was caddied by her coach, Ryan Murphy.

Schubert won the 2017 U.S. Women's Amateur, defeating the number-3 ranked amateur player in the world and former Olympian, Albane Valenzuela, in the final.

== Professional career ==
Schubert turned professional in 2018 and made her pro debut at the 2018 Indy Women in Tech Championship on the LPGA Tour. She began playing on the Symetra Tour in 2019. She won her first professional event at the Carolina Golf Classic on the 2021 Symetra Tour.

== Amateur wins ==
- 2012 (1) AJGA Music City Junior Girls
- 2013 (1) PNC Bank Junior Championship
- 2014 (2) Under Armour - Scott Stallings Championship, The Alamo Invitational
- 2017 (3) Lady Buckeye Invitational, U.S. Women's Amateur, Betsy Rawls Longhorn Invite

== Professional wins (1) ==
=== Symetra Tour wins (1) ===
- 2021 Carolina Golf Classic

== Results in LPGA majors ==
Results not in chronological order.

Tournament	2017	2018	2019	2020	2021	2022	2023	2024	2025	2026
Chevron Championship		CUT					CUT			CUT
U.S. Women's Open		CUT								
Women's PGA Championship						T65	CUT			CUT
The Evian Championship	T58			NT		2	WD			
Women's British Open						CUT				

Top 10
Did not play

CUT = missed the half-way cut
WD = withdrew
NT = no tournament
T = tied

=== Summary ===
Tournament	Wins	2nd	3rd	Top-5	Top-10	Top-25	Events	Cuts made
Chevron Championship	0	0	0	0	0	0	3	0
U.S. Women's Open	0	0	0	0	0	0	1	0
Women's PGA Championship	0	0	0	0	0	0	3	1
The Evian Championship	0	1	0	1	1	1	3	2
Women's British Open	0	0	0	0	0	0	1	0
Totals	0	1	0	1	1	1	11	3

== LPGA Tour career summary ==
Year	Tournaments played	Cuts made*	Wins	2nd	3rd	Top 10s	Best finish	Earnings ($)	Money list rank	Scoring average	Scoring rank
2017	1	1	0	0	0	0	T58	n/a	n/a	72.33	n/a
2018	3	0	0	0	0	0	CUT	n/a	n/a	76.33	n/a
2019	1	0	0	0	0	0	CUT	n/a	n/a	71.00	n/a
2020	Did not play										
2021	Did not play										
2022	23	16	0	1	0	1	2	771,054	37	71.99	105
2023	21	9	0	0	0	1	9	59,339	150	73.84	161
2024	11	4	0	0	0	0	T19	66,973	150	71.93	91
2025	1	0	0	0	0	0	CUT	0	n/a	71.50	n/a
Totals^	56 (2022)	29	0	1	0	2	2	897,366	359		

^ Official as of 2025 season
* Includes match play and other tournaments without a cut.

== World ranking ==
Schubert's positions in the Women's World Golf Rankings at the end of each calendar year have been:

Year	World ranking	Source
2017	684	
2018	897	
2019	865	
2020	801	
2021	379	
2022	76	
2023	192	
2024	530	
2025	291	

== Team appearances ==
Amateur

- Curtis Cup (representing the United States): 2018 (winners)
- Arnold Palmer Cup (representing the United States): 2018 (winners)
