= Melanie Green =

American professional golfer (born 2001)

Personal information
- Nationality: United States
- Born: December 19, 2001 (age 24) Medina, New York, U.S.

Career
- Sport: Golf
- College: University of South Florida
- Turned professional: 2024
- Current tour: LPGA Tour
- Former tour: Epson Tour
- Professional wins: 2

Number of wins by tour
- Epson Tour: 2

Best results in LPGA major championships
- Chevron Championship: T45: 2026
- Women's PGA C'ship: CUT: 2026
- U.S. Women's Open: T40: 2026
- Women's British Open: CUT: 2026
- Evian Championship: T59: 2026

Achievements and awards
- AAC Women's Golf Player of the Year: 2024
- WGCA D-1 All-American Second Team: 2024
- Epson Tour Player of the Year: 2025
- Epson Tour Rookie of the Year: 2025

Melanie Green (born December 19, 2001) is an American professional golfer. In 2024, she won The Women's Amateur Championship, the first American to do so since 1996.

== Early life ==
Green was born in Medina, New York to Melissa and Ron Green, the latter a former college baseball outfielder. While attending Medina High School, she earned five varsity letters, won two state championships, was named a 2019 AJGA Rolex Junior All-American, and had qualified for the U.S. Women's Amateur and U.S. Women's Amateur Four-Ball in 2019. Green was recruited by and signed with the University of South Florida's women's golf team in 2019. At this time, she was the No. 1 recruit in the Class of 2020 out of New York. She was also ranked No. 25 in the Golfweek Junior Rankings and No. 31 in the Rolex AJGA rankings.

== Amateur career ==
In her freshman season at South Florida, Green played in all five tournaments and was the Bulls' lowest scorer in three of them. She was also named to the AAC Women's Golf All-Conference Team and All-Academic Team. She finished that season tied for 4th in the conference tournament.

In the 2021–22 season, Green was named to the All-Conference team for a second season. She qualified for and finished 27th in the NCAA Regional as an individual. She also earned invitations to the U.S. Women's Open as an amateur and the U.S. Women's Amateur.

In the 2022–23 season, Green helped lead the Bulls to an NCAA Regional team appearance and a second straight individual appearance. She finished the season ranked 12th in the country, was named to the All-Conference team for a third year, and earned an WGCA All-American Honorable Mention becoming the sixth South Florida Women's Golf team member to earn the honor and first since 1999.

In her senior season, Green finished the year ranked 23rd in the country earning All-Conference team honors for the fourth straight year and being named to the WGCA All-American Second team. Additionally, she was named the AAC Women's Golf Player of the Year and selected to Team USA for the 2024 Arnold Palmer Cup, all firsts for the Bulls.

On June 29, 2024, Green became the first American to win The Women's Amateur Championship in 28 years. The last to do it was Kelli Kuehne. Green made birdie on two of her last three holes to take the crown. This victory earned her a spot in the next two LPGA majors, The Amundi Evian Championship and the AIG Women's Open. She can also compete in the U.S. Women's Open and the Chevron Championship in 2025.

== Professional career ==
In November 2024, Green announced her intentions to turn professional. She began playing on the Epson Tour in 2025. She won the 2025 Island Resort Championship in June and the Guardian Championship in September. She finished first in the Race for the Card rankings to graduate to the LPGA Tour for 2026. She also won the Player of the Year and Rookie of the Year awards.

== Amateur wins ==
- 2022 Trinity Forest Invitational
- 2024 FAU Paradise Invitational, Mountain View Collegiate, The Women's Amateur Championship

== Professional wins (2) ==
=== Epson Tour wins (2) ===
- 2025 Island Resort Championship, Guardian Championship

== Results in LPGA majors ==
Tournament	2024	2025	2026
Chevron Championship			T45
U.S. Women's Open			T40
Women's PGA Championship			CUT
The Evian Championship	CUT		T59
Women's British Open			CUT

Did not play

CUT = missed the half-way cut
T = tied

== U.S. national team appearances ==
Amateur

- Arnold Palmer Cup: 2024 (winners)
- Curtis Cup: 2024
