= Wang Xinying =

Chinese professional golfer (born 1999)

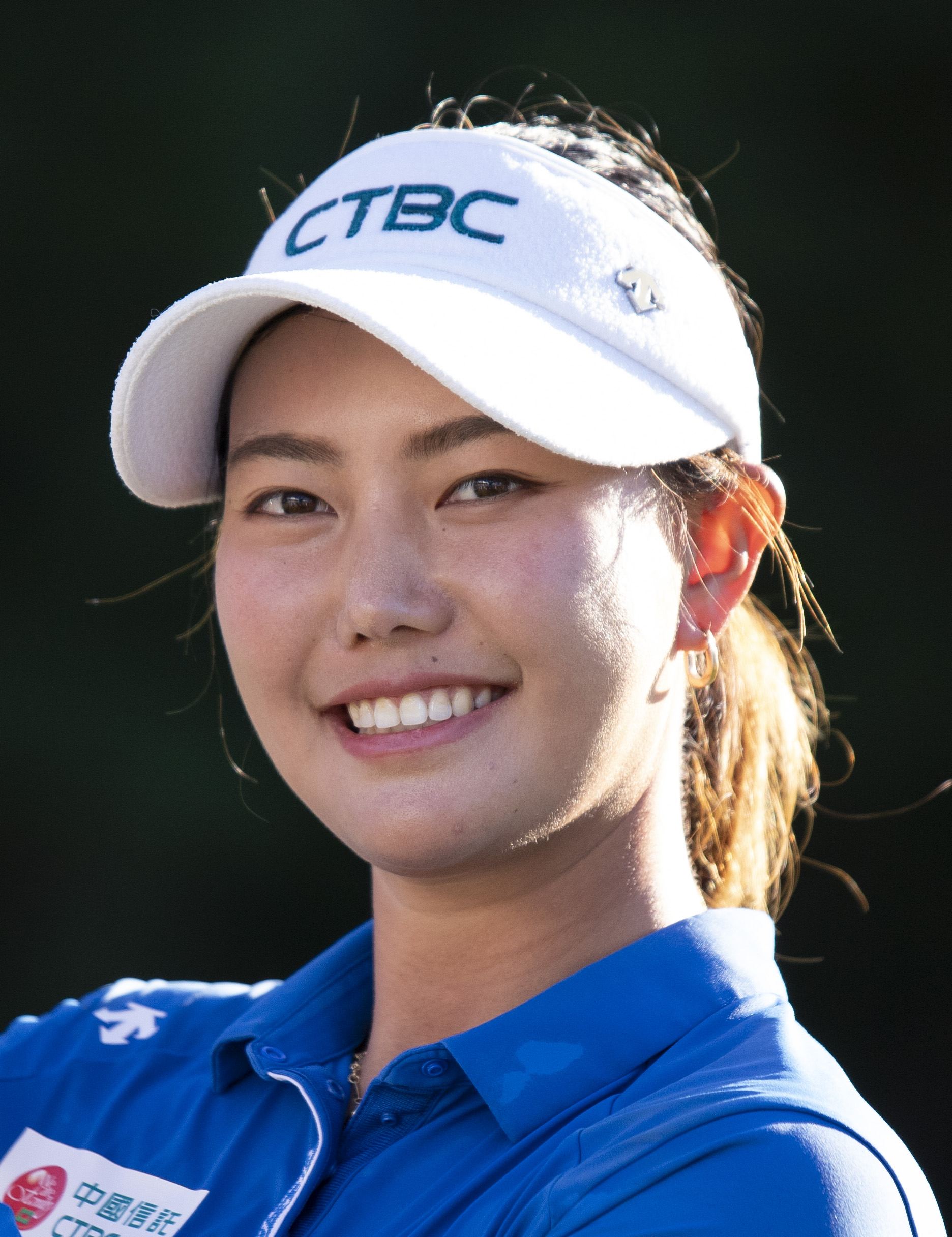
- Wang in 2025

Personal information
- Nationality: China
- Born: 11 February 1999 (age 27) Beijing, China
- Height: 5 ft 7 in (1.70 m)

Career
- Sport: Golf
- College: Duke University
- Turned professional: 2020
- Current tour: LPGA Tour (joined 2025)
- Former tour: Epson Tour
- Professional wins: 4

Number of wins by tour
- LPGA Tour: 1
- Epson Tour: 1
- Other: 2

Best results in LPGA major championships
- Chevron Championship: T52: 2025
- Women's PGA C'ship: T19: 2025
- U.S. Women's Open: CUT: 2026
- Women's British Open: CUT: 2025
- Evian Championship: CUT: 2025, 2026

Wang Xinying, also known as Miranda Wang (Chinese: 王馨迎; born 11 February 1999), is a Chinese professional golfer who plays on the LPGA Tour.

== Professional career ==
In 2025, Wang won her first LPGA Tour title at the FM Championship, narrowly beating world number one Jeeno Thitikul. Wang started the final round with a 3-shot lead, but squandered the lead to Thitikul on the back nine, though a timely birdie on the 17th hole alongside a Thitikul bogey on the same hole secured her the win by 1 stroke.

== Professional wins (4) ==
=== LPGA Tour wins (1) ===
No.	Date	Tournament	Winning score	To par	Margin of victory	Runner-up	Winner's share ($)
1	31 Aug 2025	FM Championship	66-67-65-70=268	−20	1 stroke	(Thailand) Jeeno Thitikul	615,000

=== Epson Tour wins (1) ===
No.	Date	Tournament	Winning score	To par	Margin of victory	Runner-up	Winner's share ($)
1	26 Mar 2023	IOA Championship	69-65-70=204	−12	1 stroke	(Malaysia) Natasha Andrea Oon	30,000

=== Other wins (2) ===
- 2022 Coushatta Tribe of Louisiana Open, Beaumont Emergency Hospital Open

== Results in LPGA majors ==
Tournament	2025	2026
Chevron Championship	T52	CUT
U.S. Women's Open		CUT
Women's PGA Championship	T19	CUT
The Evian Championship	CUT	CUT
Women's British Open	CUT	

Did not play

CUT = missed the half-way cut
"T" = tied
