= Asterisk Talley =

American amateur golfer (born 2009)

Personal information
- Nationality: United States
- Born: February 14, 2009 (age 17) Fresno, California, U.S.

Career
- Sport: Golf
- Status: Amateur

Best results in LPGA major championships
- Chevron Championship: T49: 2026
- Women's PGA C'ship: DNP
- U.S. Women's Open: T22: 2026
- Women's British Open: DNP
- Evian Championship: CUT: 2026

Asterisk Talley (born February 14, 2009) is an American amateur golfer. In 2024, she won the U.S. Women's Amateur Four-Ball and was runner-up at the U.S. Girls' Junior and the U.S. Women's Amateur, becoming the first to compete in three USGA championship final matches in the same year. She won the 2026 U.S. Women's Amateur.

== Early and personal life ==
Talley was born in Fresno, California and grew up in Chowchilla, California, and was a student at Chowchilla Union High School. Talley's mother is Greek, and in Greek, Asterisk means "little star."

== Amateur career ==
Talley, a three-time junior All-American, reached the round of 16 in the 2022 U.S. Girls' Junior at 13 years of age. The next year, she captured the Rolex Girls Junior Championship, one of the major events on the American Junior Golf Association circuit.

Talley was the breakout female amateur of 2024 as she became the first to compete in three USGA championship final matches in the same year. She teamed with fellow Northern Californian Sarah Lim to win the U.S. Women's Amateur Four-Ball, and finished runner-up to Rianne Malixi in both the U.S. Girls' Junior and the U.S. Women's Amateur.

Also in 2024, Talley represented the United States in both the Junior Solheim Cup and Curtis Cup at Sunningdale Golf Club in England, where she beat world number one Lottie Woad in Sunday singles, 3 and 2. At 15 years and 105 days, she was the youngest competitor in the 2024 U.S. Women's Open at Lancaster Country Club, where she shared low amateur honors with Catherine Park and 2023 U.S. Women's Amateur champion Megan Schofill, having finished the second round tied for 5th place.

In 2025, Talley won the Annika Invitational in Florida by five strokes in January, and was runner-up at the Augusta National Women's Amateur, a stroke behind Spain's Carla Bernat in April. Talley shot a 68 after having eagled the par-4 first hole at Augusta National Golf Club in the final round, a first in tournament history.

On August 9, 2026, Talley won the 2026 U.S. Women's Amateur championship, defeating Japan's Anna Iwanaga, 8 and 6 in the final match.

== Amateur wins ==
- 2021 AJGA Junior at San Jose
- 2023 Se-ri Pak Desert Junior, Rolex Girls Junior Championship, C.T. Pan Foundation Championship
- 2024 Junior Invitational, The PING Invitational, U.S. Women's Amateur Four-Ball (with Sarah Lim)
- 2025 Hilton Grand Vacations Annika Invitational, Fortinet Girls Invitational, Girl's Junior PGA Championship, The Elite Invitational
- 2026 Fortinet Girls Invitational, Junior Invitational, U.S. Women's Amateur, Hilton Grand Vacations Annika Invitational

== Results in LPGA majors ==
Tournament	2024	2025	2026
Chevron Championship		CUT	T49
U.S. Women's Open	T44LA	CUT	T22
Women's PGA Championship			
The Evian Championship			CUT
Women's British Open			

Did not play

LA = low amateur
CUT = missed the half-way cut
"T" = tied

== U.S. national team appearances ==
Amateur

- Junior Solheim Cup: 2023, 2024 (winners)
- Spirit International Amateur: 2024
- Curtis Cup: 2024, 2026 (winners)
