= Gurleen Kaur =

American professional golfer (born c.2000)

Personal information
- Nationality: United States
- Born: c. 2000 Houston, Texas, U.S.
- Height: 5 ft 7 in (170 cm)

Career
- Sport: Golf
- College: Baylor University
- Turned professional: 2022
- Current tour: LPGA Tour
- Former tour: Epson Tour

Best results in LPGA major championships
- Chevron Championship: CUT: 2022, 2025, 2026
- Women's PGA C'ship: CUT: 2025, 2026
- U.S. Women's Open: 65th: 2026
- Women's British Open: DNP
- Evian Championship: DNP

Gurleen Kaur (born c.2000) is an American professional golfer currently on the LPGA Tour.

== Early life and education ==
Kaur was born in Houston, Texas. She attended Cypress Woods High School, where she graduated early to attend Baylor University.

== Amateur career ==
As an amateur at Baylor, Kaur was named an all-American three times by Golfweek, only the second player in history to do so. She set the school record for single-season stroke average during her 2020–21 season. She qualified for the Augusta National Women's Amateur in 2021 and the 2021 U.S. Women's Open where she finished in 66th place. As an amateur, she also played in the 2022 Chevron Championship on the LPGA Tour.

== Professional career ==
Kaur turned professional in 2022. She played on the ANNIKA Women's All-Pro Tour in 2023 and then the Epson Tour later that same year. She finished tied for second place at the Epson Tour Championship and finished tied for fifth at the LPGA qualifying series, earning her LPGA Tour card for 2024.

== Personal life ==
Kaur has a younger sister, Ashleen Kaur, who also played for Baylor.

== Amateur wins ==
- 2019 Bruzzy Challenge
- 2020 Schooner Fall Classic, Betsy Rawls Longhorn Invite
- 2021 Rainbow Wahine Invitational

== Results in LPGA majors ==
Results not in chronological order.

Tournament	2021	2022	2023	2024	2025	2026
Chevron Championship		CUT			CUT	CUT
U.S. Women's Open	66				CUT	65
Women's PGA Championship					CUT	CUT
The Evian Championship						
Women's British Open						

Did not play

CUT = missed the half-way cut

== U.S. national team appearances ==
- Arnold Palmer Cup: 2022
