= Gina Kim (golfer) =

American professional golfer (born 2000)

Personal information
- Nationality: United States
- Born: May 4, 2000 (age 26) Albuquerque, New Mexico, U.S.

Career
- Sport: Golf
- College: Duke University
- Turned professional: 2022
- Current tour: LPGA Tour
- Former tour: Epson Tour
- Professional wins: 5

Number of wins by tour
- LPGA Tour: 1
- Epson Tour: 4

Best results in LPGA major championships
- Chevron Championship: CUT: 2023
- Women's PGA C'ship: T57: 2023
- U.S. Women's Open: T12: 2019
- Women's British Open: CUT: 2023, 2026
- Evian Championship: CUT: 2022, 2026

Gina Kim (born May 4, 2000) is an American professional golfer.

== Background ==
Kim was born in Albuquerque, New Mexico, to parents of Korean origin. They moved to Chapel Hill, North Carolina, when Gina was age 3. She took up golfing at age 7, encouraged by her parents, who both played golf before becoming professors at the University of North Carolina at Chapel Hill. By mid-2014 and at age 14, she was ranked the No. 1 female junior golfer (under 18) in North Carolina. She graduated from Chapel Hill High School and joined Duke University women's golf team in August 2018. In January 2022 Kim decided to forego her final semester with the Duke Women's golf team and turn professional. She graduated from college in May 2022.

== Amateur career ==
Throughout her junior career, Kim collected 27 top-10 AJGA finishes. She was a two-time North Carolina 3A state high school champion and competed in the Evian Junior Cup in 2014. In 2016, Kim won the AJGA Rolex Junior Girls Championship, her first AJGA Invitational Tournament. Kim represented the United States at the Junior Ryder Cup (2016) and the Junior Solheim Cup (2017). Two-time Rolex Junior All-America Kim, qualified for the 2018 U.S. Women's Open. Kim joined the Duke University women's golf team starting with the 2018–19 season, competed in all four fall collegiate tournaments, and won individually the Landfall Tradition at the County Club of Landfall in Wilmington, North Carolina, as the team won the tournament. In spring 2019, Kim played in six collegiate tournaments including the ACC and NCAA National Championship and made a great contribution to the team victory in NCAA National Championship. With the victory, the Duke women's golf team is now seven-time national champion, and remains the winningest program in Duke history. Kim competed in the U.S. Women's Open and shot an opening-round, 5-under 66, which matches the lowest round for an amateur in U.S. Women's Open history. She followed with rounds of 72-73-72 for a 1-under total that left her tied for 12th and claimed low-amateur honors.

After one season break due to COVID-19, Kim played all collegiate tournaments in the spring, 2021. Kim won individually the ACC championship at Sedgefield Country Club, Greensboro, North Carolina as the team won the tournament. Kim carded her third straight round in the 60s on her way to claiming individual medalist honors at the ACC Championship. Coming off helping Duke win its 22nd ACC Championship in school history and claiming ACC medalist accolades, Kim has been selected the Golfweek Player of the Week and the ACC Player of the Month (April). Kim claimed the North and South Women's Amateur title on Pinehurst No. 2 in Pinehurst, North Carolina, medaled at Stage I of LPGA Q-School after capping a 15-under at Mission Hills Country Club in Rancho Mirage, California, and represented the U.S. in Curtis Cup at Conwy Golf Club, North Wales.

== Professional career ==
Kim went through the Q-Series, as an amateur, and earned her LPGA Tour membership for 2022. She turned professional in early 2022. Her best WAGR ranking was 8th.

Kim won her first professional event at the 2022 Inova Mission Inn Resort and Club Championship on the Epson Tour.

== Amateur wins ==
- 2012 ACC Junior Championship
- 2014 AJGA Junior at Cattail Creek
- 2015 PGA Junior Series Westbrook CC
- 2016 PGA Junior Series Kearney Hill Golf Links, AJGA Rolex Girls Junior Championship
- 2018 Landfall Tradition
- 2020 Harder Hall Women's Invitational
- 2021 ACC Women's Golf Championship, North and South Women's Amateur

== Professional wins (5) ==
=== LPGA Tour wins (1) ===
| No. | Date | Tournament | Winning score | To par | Margin of victory | Runners-up |
|---|---|---|---|---|---|---|
| 1 | 14 Jun 2026 | Dow Championship (with (United States) Yana Wilson) | 68-63-70-62=263 | −17 | 2 strokes | (South Korea) Kim Hyo-joo and (South Korea) Choi Hye-jin |

=== Epson Tour wins (4) ===
- 2022 Inova Mission Inn Resort and Club Championship
- 2025 IOA Golf Classic, Copper Rock Championship, Hartford HealthCare Women's Championship

== U.S. national team appearances ==
- Evian Championship Juniors Cup: 2014 (winners)
- Junior Ryder Cup: 2016 (winners)
- Junior Solheim Cup: 2017 (winners)
- World Junior Girls Championship: 2017
- Toyota Junior World Cup: 2018
- Arnold Palmer Cup: 2020, 2021 (winners)
- Curtis Cup: 2021 (winners)
