= Saki Baba =

Japanese professional golfer (born 2005)

Saki Baba 馬場咲希
Personal information
- Nationality: Japan
- Born: 25 April 2005 (age 21) Hino, Tokyo, Japan
- Height: 177 cm (5 ft 10 in)

Career
- Sport: Golf
- Turned professional: 2023
- Current tours: LPGA of Japan Tour; LPGA Tour
- Former tour: Epson Tour

Best results in LPGA major championships
- Chevron Championship: T27: 2026
- Women's PGA C'ship: 52nd: 2026
- U.S. Women's Open: T36: 2025
- Women's British Open: CUT: 2023, 2025
- Evian Championship: CUT: 2023, 2025

Saki Baba (馬場咲希, Baba Saki) (born 25 April 2005) is a Japanese professional golfer and LPGA Tour player. She won the 2022 U.S. Women's Amateur.

== Amateur career ==
In 2021, Baba finished sixth in the Kanto Women's Amateur and seventh in the Kanto Junior Championship. The next year, she won both tournaments.

Baba qualified for the 2022 U.S. Women's Open at the Boso Country Club in Japan on 25 April, her 17th birthday, carding rounds of 69-70. At Pine Needles Lodge & Golf Club, Baba shot 73-72-70-78 to finish tied for 49th, one of four amateurs to make the cut.

In August 2022, Baba won the U.S. Women's Amateur, becoming the second Japanese player to capture the title after Michiko Hattori in 1985. Baba won the last six holes of the 36-hole final, ending the match against Canadian Monet Chun with a birdie on the 27th hole, for a score of 11 and 9.

Baba represented Japan at the 2022 Espirito Santo Trophy in France alongside Mizuki Hashimoto and Miku Ueta. They shared third place with Germany, one stroke behind Sweden and the United States.

== Professional career ==
Baba turned professional in 2023 and earned status on the 2024 LPGA of Japan Tour and Epson Tour via qualifying school.

In December 2024, Baba earned her LPGA Tour card for 2025 by finishing T-24 at the LPGA Final Qualifying Tournament.

In her rookie LPGA Tour season, Baba recorded four top-10 finishes including season-best ties for 6th at the Dow Championship and Ford Championship, to finished 71st in the season rankings and keep her card.

== Amateur wins ==
- 2022 Kanto Women's Amateur Championship, Kanto Junior Championship, U.S. Women's Amateur

== Results in LPGA majors ==
Results not in chronological order.

Tournament	2022	2023	2024	2025	2026
Chevron Championship		CUT		CUT	T27
U.S. Women's Open	T49	CUT		T36	
Women's PGA Championship				CUT	52
The Evian Championship		CUT		CUT	
Women's British Open		CUT		CUT	

Did not play

CUT = missed the half-way cut
T = tied

== Team appearances ==
Amateur

- Espirito Santo Trophy (representing Japan): 2022
