= Ruixin Liu =

Chinese professional golfer

Personal information
- Nationality: China
- Born: 13 November 1998 (age 27) Shenzhen, China

Career
- Sport: Golf
- Turned professional: 2017
- Current tours: LPGA Tour; Ladies European Tour
- Former tour: Epson Tour
- Professional wins: 9

Number of wins by tour
- Ladies European Tour: 1
- Epson Tour: 7
- Other: 1

Best results in LPGA major championships
- Chevron Championship: CUT: 2024, 2025, 2026
- Women's PGA C'ship: T31: 2025
- U.S. Women's Open: T33: 2023
- Women's British Open: DNP
- Evian Championship: T21: 2025

Achievements and awards
- Symetra Tour Player of the Year: 2018

Ruixin Liu (born 13 November 1998) is a Chinese professional golfer who plays on the U.S.-based LPGA Tour. She was Symetra Tour Player of the Year in 2019.

== Early life and amateur career ==
Liu grew up in Shenzhen. She started playing golf with her family at an early age and by age nine or ten, she knew she wanted to play golf for the rest of her life. In 2011, she won the Mission Hills Jack Nicklaus Junior.

When she was 13, her family moved to Orlando, Florida, where golf became the family's focus. She began training at the ANNIKA Academy, and in 2013, just one year after moving to Orlando, at age 14, she received an exemption into the Symetra Tour's Volvik Championship, where she made the cut.

In 2014, she won the Suncoast Ladies Tour event at Remington Golf Club, a professional event. She was runner-up at the 2015 ANNIKA Invitational behind Angel Yin.

== Professional career ==
Liu turned professional as an 18-year-old and joined the Symetra Tour in 2017. In her rookie season, she made 15 cuts in 18 events, with her top finish a runner-up at the Island Resort Championship. In 2018, she recorded three victories at the Island Resort Championship, IOA Golf Classic and Symetra Tour Championship. She finished first on the Symetra Tour money list to earn LPGA Tour membership for 2019.

In 2018, Liu also experienced a medical scare on the course where her heart rate spiked to 140 BPM. After extensive testing, it was determined that she is allergic to 13 different weeds and grasses commonly found on golf courses in the United States.

Liu was a rookie on the 2019 LPGA Tour where her best finish was a tie for 11th at the Marathon Classic in Ohio.

Back on the Symetra Tour, she won the 2020 FireKeepers Casino Hotel Championship. In 2021, she won both the Carlisle Arizona Women's Golf Classic and Casino Del Sol Golf Classic. Her father caddied for her in her first six Symetra Tour wins. She finished 5th on the money list to re-join the LPGA Tour in 2022. She finished 3rd at the 2024 FM Championship.

In November 2025, Liu won the Aramco China Championship and accepted Ladies European Tour membership.

== Amateur wins ==
- 2011 Mission Hills Jack Nicklaus Junior
- 2013 China Amateur Futures Tour Leg 5

== Professional wins (9) ==
=== Ladies European Tour wins (1) ===
No.	Date	Tournament	Winning score	To par	Margin of victory	Runners-up	Winner's share ($)
1	8 Nov 2025	Aramco China Championship^	70-65-68=203	−16	3 strokes	(Thailand) Trichat Cheenglab (China) Lin Qianhui (Switzerland) Chiara Tamburlini (China) Zeng Liqi	225,000

^ Co-sanctioned with the China LPGA Tour

=== Epson Tour wins (7) ===
No.	Date	Tournament	Winning score	To par	Margin of victory	Runner(s)-up	Winner's share ($)
1	24 Jun 2018	Island Resort Championship	68-70-69=207	−9	1 stroke	(United States) Lori Beth Adams (South Korea) Min Seo Kwak	26,250
2	30 Sep 2018	IOA Golf Classic	66-66-67=199	−14	1 stroke	(Philippines) Dottie Ardina (South Korea) Simin Feng (United States) Dana Finkelstein	22,500
3	7 Oct 2018	Epson Tour Championship	64-67-67-71=269	−19	1 stroke	(Thailand) Pavarisa Yoktuan	34,500
4	26 Jul 2020	FireKeepers Casino Hotel Championship	66-66-71=203	−13	2 strokes	(United States) Bailey Tardy	26,250
5	31 Mar 2021	Carlisle Arizona Women's Golf Classic	66-69-67-69=271	−17	Playoff	(United States) Rose Zhang (a)	30,000
6	15 Apr 2021	Casino Del Sol Golf Classic	68-68-70-67=273	−15	Playoff	(Switzerland) Morgane Métraux	30,000
7	12 May 2024	Carlisle Arizona Women's Golf Classic	64-72-70-64=270	−14	3 strokes	(United States) Mariel Galdiano	60,000

=== Other wins (1) ===
- 2014 Suncoast Ladies Tour – Remington GC (as an amateur)

== Results in LPGA majors ==
Tournament	2021	2022	2023	2024	2025	2026
Chevron Championship				CUT	CUT	CUT
U.S. Women's Open			T33	CUT		
Women's PGA Championship	CUT	CUT		73	T31	
The Evian Championship		CUT		CUT	T21	
Women's British Open						

Did not play

CUT = missed the half-way cut
"T" = tied

== Team appearances ==
Professional

- International Crown (representing China): 2023, 2025
