= Pajaree Anannarukarn =

Thai professional golfer (born 1999)

Personal information
- Full name: Pajaree Anannarukarn
- Nickname: Meaw
- Nationality: Thailand
- Born: 30 May 1999 (age 27) Bangkok, Thailand
- Height: 5 ft 5 in (1.65 m)

Career
- Sport: Golf
- Turned professional: 2017
- Current tour: LPGA Tour (joined 2019)
- Professional wins: 8

Number of wins by tour
- LPGA Tour: 2
- Ladies European Tour: 1
- Other: 6

Best results in LPGA major championships
- Chevron Championship: T28: 2021
- Women's PGA C'ship: T14: 2019
- U.S. Women's Open: T8: 2026
- Women's British Open: T10: 2024
- Evian Championship: 6th: 2024
Medal record
Women's golf
Representing Thailand
SEA Games
Gold medal – first place	2015 Singapore	Team

Pajaree Anannarukarn (Thai: ปาจรีย์ อนันต์นฤการ; RTGS: Pachari Anannaruekan; born 30 May 1999) is a Thai professional golfer who has played on the LPGA Tour since 2019. She won her first LPGA event at the 2021 ISPS Handa World Invitational. She secured her second LPGA Tour title at the Bank of Hope LPGA Match-Play in 2023. In 2024, she achieved notable finishes in major championships, placing 6th at The Evian Championship and tying for 10th at the Women's British Open.

== Early life and amateur career ==
Anannarukarn was born in 1999 in Bangkok, Thailand. She became interested in golf by watching her father, Veerapol, play with his friends and began playing the sport at the age of five. Anannarukarn grew up competing in local tournaments from the age of nine and attended the American School of Bangkok.

During her amateur career, Anannarukarn enjoyed significant success on both domestic and regional levels. She won the Low Amateur trophy at the 2013 Thailand LPGA Masters and captured the 4th Singha-SAT Thai LPGA Championship on the Thai LPGA Tour in 2014. She represented Thailand internationally, most notably winning a team gold medal at the 2015 SEA Games in Singapore. She also represented her country at the Espirito Santo Trophy in 2014 and 2016.

== Professional career ==
In 2017, Anannarukarn turned professional. She joined the LPGA Tour in 2019. On 1 August 2021, she won her first LPGA Tour event at the 2021 ISPS Handa World Invitational in Northern Ireland. She made a 9-foot par putt on a second extra hole to win a playoff against Emma Talley and became the fifth Thai player to win on the LPGA Tour, joining Ariya Jutanugarn, Moriya Jutanugarn, Thidapa Suwannapura, and Patty Tavatanakit.

On 28 May 2023, Anannarukarn captured her second career LPGA Tour title by winning the Bank of Hope LPGA Match-Play at Shadow Creek in Nevada. She secured a 3-and-1 victory in the championship match against Japan's Ayaka Furue.

In 2024, she achieved notable success in the major championships. In July, she recorded her best major finish to date, claiming 6th place at The Evian Championship in France. The following month, she continued her strong form by finishing tied for 10th at the AIG Women's Open held at St Andrews.

== Personal life ==
Anannarukarn is affectionately known by her nickname "Meaw" (Thai: เมียว). She developed an interest in fashion from an early age and often emphasizes the importance of a good sense of dress and a positive attitude on the golf course.

== Amateur wins ==
- 2013 TGA-CAT Junior Ranking # 5
- 2014 TGA-SINGHA Junior Ranking # 5, TGA-SINGHA Junior Championship Q For Asia Pacific
- 2015 St. Francisville Area Foundation Junior at The Bluffs, Lockton Kansas City Junior, David Toms Foundation Shreveport Junior
- 2016 Santi Cup

== Professional wins (8) ==
=== LPGA Tour wins (2) ===
No.	Date	Tournament	Winning score	To par	Margin of victory	Runner-up
1	1 Aug 2021	ISPS Handa World Invitational^	70-69-66-70=275	−16	Playoff	(United States) Emma Talley
2	28 May 2023	Bank of Hope LPGA Match-Play	3 and 1			(Japan) Ayaka Furue

^ Co-sanctioned by the Ladies European Tour

LPGA Tour playoff record (1–0)

No.	Year	Tournament	Opponent	Result
1	2021	ISPS Handa World Invitational	(United States) Emma Talley	Won with par on second extra hole

=== Thai LPGA Tour wins (4) ===
- 2014 (1) 4th Singha-SAT Thai LPGA Championship^
- 2016 (2) 2nd Singha-SAT Thai LPGA Championship^, 5th Singha-SAT Thai LPGA Championship^
- 2017 (1) 1st Singha-SAT-Toyota Thai LPGA Championship^

^ Pajaree won the event as an amateur.

=== All Thailand Golf Tour wins (2) ===
- 2016 Singha E-San Open^
- 2017 Singha Masters^

^ Pajaree won the event as an amateur.

== Results in LPGA majors ==
Results not in chronological order.

Tournament	2019	2020	2021	2022	2023	2024	2025	2026
Chevron Championship		T32	T28	T53	T37	CUT	T30	CUT
U.S. Women's Open		CUT	T62	T20	T33		CUT	T8
Women's PGA Championship	T14	CUT	T64	T30	T39	T52	CUT	T37
The Evian Championship	T25	NT	T10	CUT	CUT	6	T49	T35
Women's British Open	CUT		T52	CUT	71	T10	T13	CUT

Top 10
Did not play

CUT = missed the half-way cut
NT = no tournament
"T" = tied

=== Summary ===
Tournament	Wins	2nd	3rd	Top-5	Top-10	Top-25	Events	Cuts made
Chevron Championship	0	0	0	0	0	0	7	5
U.S. Women's Open	0	0	0	0	1	2	6	4
Women's PGA Championship	0	0	0	0	0	1	8	6
The Evian Championship	0	0	0	0	2	3	7	5
Women's British Open	0	0	0	0	1	2	7	4
Totals	0	0	0	0	4	8	35	24

- Most consecutive cuts made – 8 (2021 ANA – 2022 WPGA)
- Longest streak of top-10s – 2 (2024 Evian – 2024 Women's British)

== LPGA Tour career summary ==
Year	Tournaments played	Cuts made*	Wins	2nd	3rd	Top 10s	Best finish	Earnings ($)	Money list rank	Scoring average	Scoring rank
2017	1	1	0	0	0	0	T64	–	n/a	73.75	n/a
2019	19	16	0	0	0	0	T12	249,049	71	70.92	34
2020	11	6	0	0	0	0	T21	73,800	95	72.06	70
2021	25	22	1	0	1	6	1	700,786	28	70.78	39
2022	29	19	0	0	0	4	T4	612,297	52	71.08	51
2023	24	18	1	0	0	1	1	588,895	50	71.96	98
2024	27	21	0	0	0	4	6	938,732	38	70.99	34
2025	26	20	0	1	0	2	2	1,540,806	22	70.91	45
Totals^	161 (2019)	120 (2019)	2	1	1	17	1	4,704,365	111		

^ Official as of 2025 season
* Includes matchplay and other tournaments without a cut.

== World ranking ==
Position in Women's World Golf Rankings at the end of each calendar year.

Year	World ranking	Source
2017	710	
2018	377	
2019	135	
2020	152	
2021	76	
2022	87	
2023	86	
2024	61	
2025	55	

== Team appearances ==
Amateur

- Espirito Santo Trophy (representing Thailand): 2014, 2016

Professional

- International Crown (representing Thailand): 2025
