= Hsu Wei-ling =

Taiwanese professional golfer (born 1994)

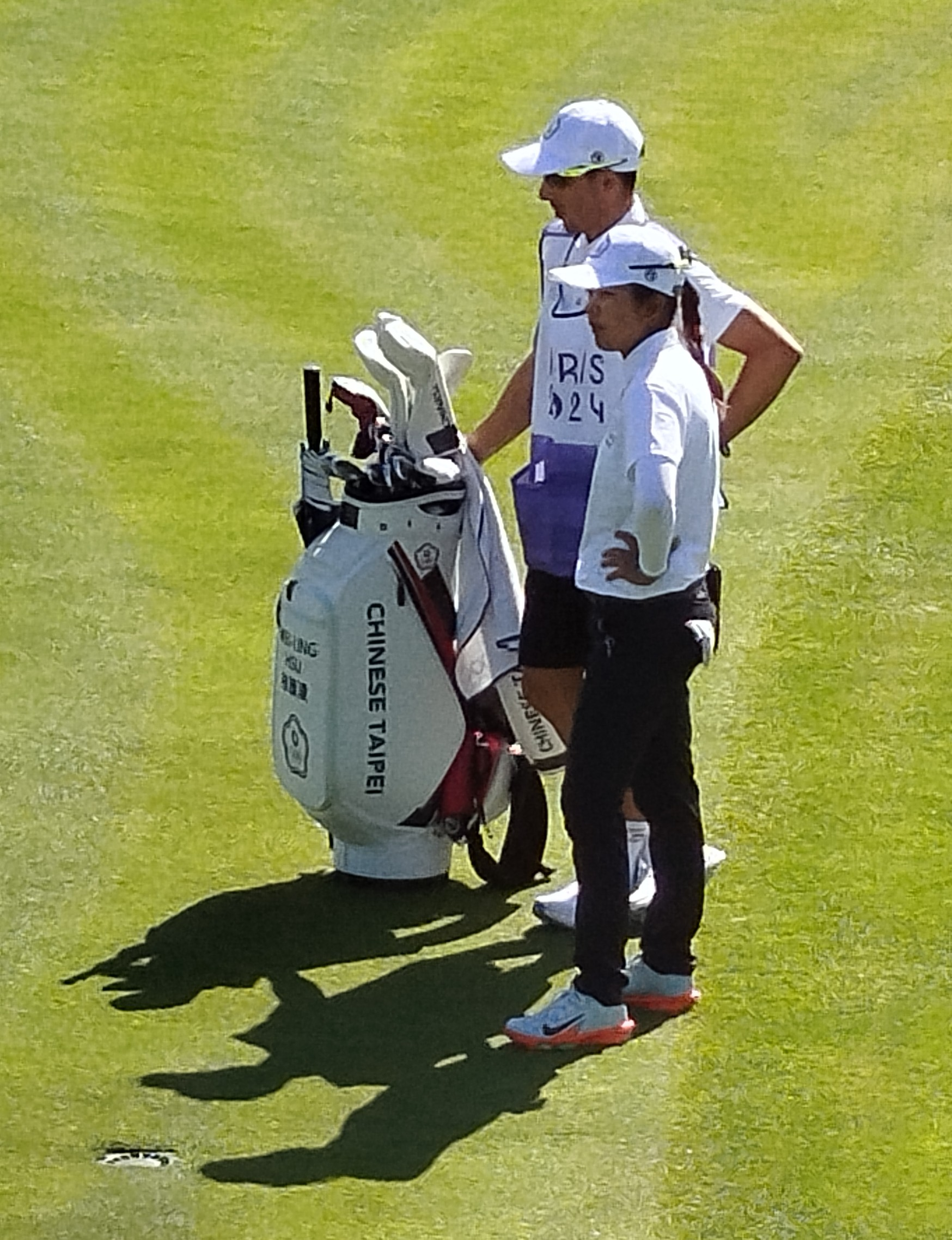

Personal information
- Nationality: Chinese Taipei
- Born: 20 October 1994 (age 32) Taipei, Taiwan
- Height: 5 ft 2 in (157 cm)

Career
- Sport: Golf
- Turned professional: 2012
- Current tour: LPGA Tour
- Former tour: Symetra Tour
- Professional wins: 6

Number of wins by tour
- LPGA Tour: 1
- Epson Tour: 2
- Other: 3

Best results in LPGA major championships
- Chevron Championship: T25: 2022
- Women's PGA C'ship: T10: 2025
- U.S. Women's Open: T5: 2018
- Women's British Open: T6: 2025, 2026
- Evian Championship: 15th: 2018

Hsu Wei-ling (Chinese: 徐薇淩; pinyin: Xú Wēilíng; born 20 October 1994) is a Taiwanese professional golfer.

Hsu was runner-up at the 2018 Pure Silk-Bahamas LPGA Classic. In May 2021, at the Pure Silk Championship on the River Course at Kingsmill Resort she "achieve[d] her lifelong dream of winning on the LPGA Tour for the first time." She represented Chinese Taipei at the 2020 Summer Olympics.

== Professional wins (6) ==
=== LPGA Tour wins (1) ===
No.	Date	Tournament	Winning score	To par	Margin of victory	Runner-up	Winner's share ($)
1	23 May 2021	Pure Silk Championship	66-72-65-68=271	−13	2 strokes	(Thailand) Moriya Jutanugarn	195,000

=== Symetra Tour wins (2) ===
- 2013 Credit Union Challenge
- 2014 Self Regional Healthcare Foundation Women's Health Charity Classic

=== Taiwan LPGA Tour wins (3) ===
- 2017 CTBC Ladies Open
- 2021 Taiwan Mobile Ladies Open
- 2024 Taiwan Mobile Ladies Open

== Results in LPGA majors ==
Results not in chronological order before.

Tournament	2014	2015	2016	2017	2018	2019	2020	2021	2022	2023	2024	2025	2026
Chevron Championship		T57	T56		T60	T61		CUT	T25	T63	T50	CUT	T55
U.S. Women's Open	CUT	CUT	CUT	CUT	T5	T39		CUT			T24	CUT	
Women's PGA Championship		21	CUT	T25	CUT	T37		CUT	T40	CUT	CUT	T10	T53
The Evian Championship		T70		T58	15	T37	NT	CUT	T58	T28	CUT	CUT	T50
Women's British Open		T69	CUT	T23	T35	CUT			CUT	T44		T6	T6

Top 10
Did not play

CUT = missed the half-way cut
NT = no tournament
"T" = tied

=== Summary ===
Tournament	Wins	2nd	3rd	Top-5	Top-10	Top-25	Events	Cuts made
Chevron Championship	0	0	0	0	0	1	10	8
U.S. Women's Open	0	0	0	1	1	2	9	3
Women's PGA Championship	0	0	0	0	1	3	11	6
The Evian Championship	0	0	0	0	0	1	10	7
Women's British Open	0	0	0	0	2	3	9	6
Totals	0	0	0	1	4	10	49	30

- Most consecutive cuts made – 5 (2025 Women's British Open – 2026 Women's British Open, current)
- Longest streak of top-10s – 1 (four times, current)

== Team appearances ==
Professional

- International Crown (representing Chinese Taipei): 2018
