= Johns (surname) =

Surname list

Johns is a surname shared by the following notable people:

- Adrian Johns (born 1951), Royal Navy vice-admiral, former Second Sea Lord and former Governor of Gibraltar
- Alan Johns (1917–1997), New Zealand scientist, chief executive and university administrator
- Alex Johns (1966–2010), American film and television producer
- Alfred Johns (1868–1934), Australian cricketer
- Andrew Johns (born 1974), Australian former rugby league footballer, brother of Matthew Johns
- Andrew Johns (triathlete) (born 1973), British triathlete
- Andy Johns (1950–2013), British music engineer
- Ben Johns (born 1999), an American professional pickleball player
- Bobby Johns (racing driver) (1932–2016), American racecar driver
- Brad Johns, Canadian politician
- Brett Johns (born 1992), Welsh mixed martial artist
- Brian Johns (born 1982), Canadian Olympic swimmer
- Brian Johns (businessman) (1936–2016), Australian company director and journalist
- Catherine Johns (born 1935), museum curator and Roman archaeologist
- Charles A. Johns (1857–1932), American lawyer, jurist and politician; justice on the Supreme Court of the Philippines
- Charles Alexander Johns (1811–1874), British botanist and author
- Charley Eugene Johns (1905–1990), American politician, 32nd governor of Florida
- Charlie Johns (1914 or 1915–1997), American farmer who married a nine-year-old neighbor - see Marriage of Charlie Johns and Eunice Winstead
- Chris Johns (disambiguation)
- Claude Hermann Walter Johns (1857–1920), English Assyriologist and Church of England clergyman
- Collin Johns (born 1993), American professional pickleball player
- Cooper Johns (born 14 July 1999), Australian former rugby league footballer, son of Matthew Johns
- Daniel Johns (born 1979), Australian musician
- Dave Johns (born 1956), English comedian and actor
- David Johns (born 1948), American Navaho painter
- David Johns (cricketer) (1921–1979), English cricketer
- Don Johns (1937–2017), Canadian retired National Hockey League player
- Doug Johns (born 1967), American retired Major League Baseball pitcher
- Emmett Johns (1928–2018), Canadian humanitarian
- Ethan Johns (born 1969), British music producer
- Fred Johns (1868–1932), Australian writer
- Gary Johns (born 1952), Australian politician
- Gene Johns (1927–1984), American businessman and politician
- Geoff Johns (born 1973), American comic book author
- George Sibley Johns (1857–1941), American journalist and newspaper editor
- Glyn Johns (born 1942), British record producer
- Glynis Johns (1923–2024), British actress
- Gord Johns (born 1969), Canadian politician
- Harold E. Johns (1915–1998), Canadian medical physicist
- Harry Johns (1903–1991), Australian rules footballer
- Helen Johns (born 1953), Canadian politician
- Helen Johns (swimmer) (1914–2014), American swimmer, Olympic champion and former world record-holder
- Henry Johns (disambiguation)
- Jack Johns (cricketer) (1885–1956), Welsh cricketer
- Jack Johns (rugby league) (born 1997), Australian former rugby league footballer
- James Johns (politician) (1893–1959), Australian politician
- James Edward Johns (1900–1984), American football player
- Jasper Johns (born 1930), American painter and printmaker
- John Johns (1796–1876), fourth Episcopal bishop of Virginia, son of Kensey Johns
- Johnny Johns (born 1951), American retired figure skater and ice dancer
- Joseph Johns (1826–1900), English convict and Australian bushranger, better known as Moondyne Joe
- Joseph Johns, Amish man who founded Johnstown, Pennsylvania, in 1800
- Keith Johns (1902–1979), Australian rules footballer
- Kensey Johns (judge) (1759–1848), American judge
- Kensey Johns Jr. (1791–1857), American politician and lawyer, son of the above
- Laura M. Johns (1849–1935), American suffragist, journalist
- Lem Johns (1925–2014), United States Secret Service agent present during the assassination of John F. Kennedy
- Les Johns (born 1942), Australian rugby league footballer
- Lori Johns (born 1965), American former Top Fuel Dragster racer
- Margo Johns (1919–2009), British actress
- Matthew Johns (born 1971), Australian rugby league footballer and channel 9 host, brother of Andrew Johns
- Mervyn Johns (1899–1992), Welsh actor, father of Glynis Johns
- Michael Johns (policy analyst) (born 1964), American political commentator, analyst and writer, former White House speechwriter
- Michael Johns (singer) (1978–2014), Australian singer/songwriter
- Michael M. E. Johns (born 1942), American physician
- Milton Johns (born 1938), British television actor
- Orrick Glenday Johns (1887–1946), American poet, son of George Sibley Johns
- Paddy Johns (born 1968), Irish former rugby union player
- Paul Johns (disambiguation)
- Peter Johns (disambiguation)
- Richard Johns (born 1939), British Royal Air Force air chief marshal
- Robert H. Johns (1942–2020), American meteorologist
- Robert J. Johns, Canadian socialist labour organizer in the 1910s
- Ronnie Johns (politician) (born 1949), American politician from Louisiana
- Sammy Johns (1946–2013), American country musician
- Sarah Johns (born 1979), American country music singer
- Stephen Johns (disambiguation)
- Steve Johns (drummer) (born 1960), American jazz drummer
- Stratford Johns (1925–2002), British stage, film and television actor
- Thomas Johns (disambiguation)
- Tony Johns (born 1960), Canadian football player
- Tracy Camilla Johns (born 1963), American film actress
- Vere Johns (1893–1966), Jamaican journalist, impresario, radio personality and actor
- Vernon Johns (1892–1965), American minister and civil rights leader
- W. E. Johns (1893–1968), British writer
- Wilbur Johns (1903–1967), American college basketball head coach and athletics director

== See also ==
- Jones (disambiguation)
