= Richard Pryse =

Richard Pryse may refer to:

- Richard Pryse (of Gogerddan) (died 1623), English politician who sat in the House of Commons from 1584
- Sir Richard Pryse, 1st Baronet (died 1651), Welsh politician who sat in the House of Commons from 1646 to 1648
- Sir Richard Pryse, 2nd Baronet (1630–1675), Welsh landowner and politician who sat in the House of Commons in 1660
