= John (surname) =

- Pronunciation: /dʒɒn/

Origin
- Origin: Hebrew
- Meaning: "YHWH has been gracious", "graced by YHWH" (Yohanan)

Other names
- Related names: Evan, Eoin, Evandro, Evaristo, Everton, Changy, Giovanni, Hanna, Hans, Hermes, Hovhannes, Ian, Iban, Ioan (Iuan), Ioane, Ivan, Iven, Ifan, Jack, Jackson, Jan, Jane, Janez, János, Jean, Jhon, Joan, João, Jahan, Johan /Johann, Johanan, Johannes, Jô, Jovan, Juan, Juhani, Nino, Nuno, Núño, Shani, Seán/Seaghán, Shane, Siôn, Yūḥanna, Yahya, Younan, Yonan, Yohannes
- Popularity: see popular names

John is a surname which, like the given name John, is derived from the Hebrew name יוֹחָנָן, Yôḥanan, meaning "Graced by Yahweh".

People with this surname include:

- Aidan John (born 2000), Canadian football player
- Anaparambil Joseph John (1893–1957), Travancorean freedom fighter and statesman, Chief Minister of Travancore-Cochin and Governor of Madras
- Augustus John (1878–1961), Welsh artist
- Avery John (born 1975), Trinidadian footballer
- Barry John (1945–2024), Welsh former rugby union player
- Barry John (artist), Welsh artist
- Barry John (theatre director) (born 1944), English-born Indian theatre director, actor and acting coach
- Caroline John (1940–2012), British actress
- Collins John (born 1985), Liberia-born Dutch footballer
- Dilwyn John (born 1944), former Welsh footballer
- Daymond John (born 1969), American fashion entrepreneur
- Edward Thomas John (1857–1931), British politician
- Elton John (born 1947), birth name Reginald Dwight, British pop singer
- Elton John (footballer) (born 1987), Trinidadian footballer
- Fritz John (1910–1994), German-American mathematician
- Gottfried John (1942–2014), German actor
- Gus John (born 1945), Grenadian-born writer, consultant, lecturer and researcher
- Gwen John (1876–1939), Welsh artist, sister of Augustus John
- Isaac John (born 1988), New Zealand Rugby League player
- Jearlean John (born 1960), Trinidad and Tobago politician
- Jetta John-Hartley, English singer-songwriter and record producer
- Joe John (1939–2025), American judge and politician in North Carolina
- Jory John, American children's book author
- Joshua John (born 1988), Dutch-Aruban footballer
- Leah John (born 2000), Canadian golfer
- Mable John (1930–2022), American blues singer
- Olivia Newton-John (1948–2022), British-Australian singer
- Otto John (1909–1997), German who plotted against Hitler, convicted of treason during the Cold War
- Prakash John (born 1947), Indian-Canadian rock and rhythm & blues bassist
- Radek John (born 1954), Czech politician
- Robert John (1946–2025), American singer-songwriter
- Robert John (photographer) (born 1961), American music photographer
- Robert Franklin John (1851–1905), farmer and politician in British Columbia, Canada
- Rosamund John (1913–1998), English actress
- Roy John (footballer) (1911–1973), Wales international footballer
- Roy John (rugby union) (1925–1981), Welsh rugby union player
- Rysen John (born 1997), American football player
- Stern John (born 1976), Trinidadian football player and manager
- Tommy John (born 1943), American baseball player
- Walter John (1879–1940), German chess player
- Wanda John-Kehewin Cree-Métis author and poet
- Little Willie John (1937–1968), American R&B singer

== See also ==
- Peter John (disambiguation)
- John (disambiguation)
- Johns (surname)
- Alternate forms for the name John
