= Thomas Johnes (disambiguation) =

Thomas Johnes may refer to:

- Thomas Johnes (1748–1816), Member of Parliament, landscape architect and social benefactor
- Thomas Johnes (priest) (1749–1826), Archdeacon of Barnstaple from 1807 to 1826
- Thomas Johnes (died 1780) (c. 1721–1780), Welsh politician
- Thomas Johnes (the elder) (died c. 1734), Welsh politician

== See also ==
- Thomas Johns (disambiguation)
