= John Wogan (disambiguation) =

John Wogan (1588–1644) was a Welsh politician.

John Wogan may also refer to:

- John Wogan (Justiciar of Ireland) (died 1321)
- John Wogan (MP died 1557), MP for Pembrokeshire
- John Wogan (MP died 1580) (1538–1580), MP for Pembrokeshire
- John B. Wogan (1890–1968), U.S. Army general
