= Walter Lloyd (1580–1661) =

Welsh politician (1580–1661)

Walter Lloyd (1580–1661) was a Welsh politician who sat in the House of Commons from 1640 to 1644. He supported the Royalist cause in the English Civil War.

Lloyd was the son of John Lloyd of Llanfair, Clydogan and Llanney. He matriculated at Lincoln College, Oxford on 7 November 1595 aged 15. He was admitted a student at Inner Temple in November 1615. In 1621 he was High Sheriff of Cardiganshire.

In November 1640, Lloyd was elected Member of Parliament for Cardiganshire in the Long Parliament. He was a commissioner of Array for Charles I and was knighted on 24 March 1643. On 5 February 1644 he was disabled from sitting in parliament for supporting the King. He was fined £1,003 9s 0d on 15 July 1647 and a further £261 on 9 July 1650. His estate was ordered to be sequestered on 13 May 1651. Lloyd was described as "a gent and a scholar, elegant in his tongue and pen, nobly just in his deportment. naturally fit to manage the affayred of his country which he did before these times."

He was married to Bridget Lloyd (née Pryse), and lived to the age of over 80, having survived to see the Restoration.

Parliament of England
Preceded by James Lewis	Member of Parliament for Cardiganshire; 1640–1644	Succeeded by Sir Richard Pryse, 1st Baronet
