= David Johns (disambiguation) =

David Johns is an American painter.

David Johns may also refer to:

- David Johns (cricketer) (1921–1979), English cricketer
- Dave Johns (born 1956), comedian
- David Mervyn Johns (1899–1992), Welsh film and television character actor
- David Johns (antiquary) of Ynysymaengwyn

== See also ==
- David John (disambiguation)
- David Jones (disambiguation)
