= High Sheriff of Cardiganshire =

Welsh county ceremonial officer

The office of High Sheriff of Cardiganshire was established in 1541, since when a high sheriff was appointed annually until 1974 when the office was transformed into that of High Sheriff of Dyfed as part of the creation of Dyfed from the amalgamation of Cardiganshire, Carmarthenshire and Pembrokeshire. Between the Edwardian Conquest of Wales in 1282 and the establishment of the High Sheriff of Cardiganshire, the sheriff's duties were mainly the responsibility of the coroner and the Custos Rotulorum of Cardiganshire. The office of High Sheriff remained first in precedence in the county until the reign of Edward VII when an Order in Council in 1908 gave the Lord Lieutenant of Cardiganshire the prime office under the Crown as the sovereign's personal representative.

== List of Sheriffs ==
- 1435: William ap Thomas

=== 16th century ===
- 1540: William Vaughan of Cilgerran Castle
- 1541: Sir John Wogan of Wiston, Pembrokeshire
- 1542: Sir Richard Herbert of Pencelly, Brecon
- 1543: Sir Thomas Jones of Abermarlais, Carmarthenshire
- 1544: Thomas John ap Rhydderch of Morfa Bychan
- 1545: William Vaughan of Cilgerran Castle
- 1546: Edward Herbert of Montgomery
- 1547: Sir John Philipps of Picton Castle
- 1548: Richard Herbert of Penkelly, Brecon
- 1549: Francis Lloyd of Hay, Montgomeryshire
- 1550: William Herbert of Parke, Montgomeryshire
- 1551: David ap Evan Llwyd, fychan, Llanvair Clydoge
- 1552: Owen Gwynne of Moelifor
- 1553: Sir Henry Jones of Newcastle
- 1554: James Morrice of Cardigan Town
- 1555: Sir John Wogan of Wiston, Pembrokeshire
- 1556: Rees Vaughan ap Rodouthe of St. Dogmael's, Pembrokeshire
- 1557: David ap Evan Lloyd, fychan of Llanvair Clydoge
- 1558: David ap Lloyd ap Robert of Anglesey
- 1559: Sir Henry Jones of Newcastle
- 1560: Nicholas Vaughan of Milton, Pembrokeshire
- 1561: John Vaughan of Whitland, Carmarthenshire
- 1562: John Lloyd of Cilgwyne
- 1563: John Wogan of Wiston, Pembrokeshire
- 1564: Jenkin Gwynne of Moel Ifor
- 1565: James Morris of Auston, Shropshire
- 1566: Hugh Llewellyn Lloyd of Llanllear
- 1567: Richard Vaughan of Whitland Abbey, Carmarthenshire
- 1568: John Powell of Penrallt
- 1569: John Price of Newtown, Montgomeryshire
- 1570: David ap Evan Lloyd, fychan, of Llanvair Clydoge
- 1571: Griffith Glyn of Pwllhely
- 1572: James Lewis of Abernant Bychan
- 1573: Rhys David Jenkin of Aberpully
- 1574: Thomas Griffith of Maes y Felin
- 1575: Morgan Llwyd of Llanllear
- 1576: John Mortimer of Coedmore
- 1577: David Lloyd Meredith of Cwm Bwn
- 1578: Jenkin Lloyd of Llanvair Clydoge
- 1579: Thomas ap Rhys William of Ystradfin, Carmarthenshire
- 1580: John Price of Gogerddan
- 1581: John Stedman of Strata Florida
- 1582: Thomas Revell of Forrest, Pembrokeshire
- 1583: Sir George Devereux of Lamphey Court
- 1584: Morgan Lloyd, of Llanllear
- 1585: Sir Richard Pryse of Gogerddan
- 1586: James Johnes of Llanbadarn-fawr
- 1587: Sir George Devereux of Lamphey Court
- 1588: Einion Philipps
- 1589: John Stedman of Strata Florida
- 1590: James Lewis David Meredyth of Abernant Bychan
- 1591: Jenkin Lloyd of Llanvair
- 1592: David Lloyd ap Evan of Abermayde
- 1593: Thomas Revell of Forrest, Pembrokeshire
- 1594: Morgan Lloyd of Llanllear
- 1595: John Stedman, junior, of Strata Florida
- 1596: Thomas ap Rhys ap William of Ystradfin, Carmarthenshire
- 1597: David Lloyd ap Hugh of Lloyd Jack
- 1598: John Birt of Lwyndyris
- 1599: Morgan Lloyd of Llanllyr
- 1600: David Lloyd Gwyn, of Llawychan

=== 17th century ===
- 1601: Richard Herbert of Penkelly, Brecon
- 1602: Sir Thomas Jones of Abermarlais Park
- 1603: John Lloyd of Llanfair Clydogau
- 1604: Sir Richard Pryse of Gogerddan
- 1605: David Lloyd (or Thomas) Parry, of Neuadd Trefawr
- 1606: George Philipps of Tregybi
- 1607: David Lloyd ap Evan of Abermayde
- 1608: John Stedman, of Ystradfin, Carmarthenshire
- 1609: Sir John Lewis of Abernant Bychan
- 1610: Thomas Price of Llanvread
- 1611: Sir George Devereux of Ystrad Ffin, Carmarthenshire
- 1612: Morris Vaughan of Glanlevy
- 1613: Evan Gwynne Jenkin, of Moel y Vor
- 1614: Morgan Gwynne, of Mynachty
- 1615: James Lewis, of Cwm Aven
- 1616: Jenkin David Lloyd Gwynn, Llanvechan
- 1617: James Stedman of Strata Florida, and David Thomas Parry of Neuadd
- 1618: Thomas Johnes of Llanbadarn-fawr
- 1619: Edward Vaughan, of Trawscoed
- 1620: David Lloyd ap Evan, of Abermayde
- 1621: John Parry of Blan-y-pant and David Thomas Parry of Neuadd
- 1622: Walter Lloyd of Llanfair Clydogau
- 1623: Evan Gwyn Jenkin of Moel y vor
- 1624: John Price of Strata Florida, later Sir John Price, Baronet
- 1625: Evan Lloyd Gwyn, of Llandissel ywch Cerdin
- 1626: Thomas Price of Ynysgerrigog
- 1627: Sir Henry Jones of Abermarlais
- 1628: Llewellyn Thomas Parry, of Tyglyn
- 1629: John Pugh of Llanvread and James Lewis, of Cwm Awen (died) and Stephen Parry, of Cwmtydy
- 1630: David Parry of Noyadd
- 1631: Rowland Pugh of Mathavarn, Montgomeryshire
- 1632: Rhys Lloyd of Bronwydd
- 1633: John Lewis of Abernant-bychan
- 1634: Hector Philipps of Cardigan Priory
- 1635: James Lewis of Cwm Awen
- 1636: Thomas Price of Ynysgerrigog
- 1637: John Stedman of Strata Florida
- 1638: John Lloyd of Crynfryn
- 1639: Richard Pryse, of Gogerddan, later Sir Richard Pryse, 1st Baronet
- 1640: Jenkin David Lloyd, Gwyon Llanvechan
- 1641: David Evans of Llechwedd Deri
- 1642: Henry Vaughan of Cilcennin
- 1643–1644: Thomas Lloyd of Dan-y-Forest
- 1645: James Lewis of Cilcyffeth, Pembrokeshire
- 1646: James Lewis of Cwm Awen
- 1647: Thomas Lloyd of Guerncellig
- 1648: Hugh Lloyd of Lloyd Jack
- 1649: James Philipps of Tregiby
- 1650: John Lloyd of Fairdreffe
- 1651: Richard ap Evan Lloyd, of Ystradtilo
- 1652: Thomas Parry, of Towyn
- 1653: Thomas Evans, of Peterwell
- 1654: Henry Vaughan, of Cilcennin
- 1655: Sir Richard Pryse, 2nd Baronet of Gogerddan,
- 1656: Thomas Lloyde, of Llanfair Clydoge
- 1657: Morgan Herbert, of Havod Ychdryde
- 1658: Morgan Herbert, of Havod Ychdryde
- 1659: Morgan Herbert, of Havod Ychdryde
- 1660: Morgan Herbert, of Havod Ychdryde
- 1661: Thomas Lloyd, of Rhiwarthen
- 1662: David Lloyd, of Crynvryn
- 1663: Watkin Lloyd, of Wernnewidd
- 1664: James Lewis of Abernant-bychan
- 1665: John Jones of Nanteos
- 12 November 1665: James Stedman, of Strata Florida
- 18 November 1665: John Williams, of Abernantbychan
- 7 November 1666: James Stedman, of Strata Florida
- 6 November 1667: William Somner or Sommers, of Llanllear
- 6 November 1668: Henry Summers, of Llanllear
- 11 November 1669: Sir John Williams, 1st Baronet
- 19 January 1669/70: Hector Phillips, of Tregibby
- 4 November 1670: James Johnes, of Dolau Cothy
- 9 November 1671: Erasmus Lloyd
- 11 November 1672: John Lewis, of Cram Owen or Gernos
- 1673: Hugh Lloyd, of Lloyd Jack
- 12 November 1673: Thomas Jones, of Llanvayregledoge
- 18 November 1674: Nicholas Lewis
- 15 November 1675: Thomas Price
- 1676: Cornelius le Brun of Nanteos
- 10 November 1676: Benjamin Collier
- 10 January 1676/7: Morgan Lloyd, of Greengrove
- 15 November 1677: John Philips, of Dolhaydd
- 1679: Edward Jones of Llanina
- 13 November 1679: Richard Herbert
- 1680: Thomas Lloyd of Bronwydd
- 4 November 1680: Richard Herbert
- 1681: Thomas Price of Ynysgerrigog
- 1682: Morgan Lloyd of Ffoshelig
- 1683: John Lloyd of Glangwili
- 1684: John Herbert, of Gogerddan
- 1685: David Parry, of Noyadd Trevawr
- 1686: Evan Lloyd, of Alteroddin
- 1687: Hugh Powell of Nantgwillt, Radnorshire
- 1688: Hector Philipps of the Priory
- 1689: William Herbert of Havod Ychdryd
- 1690: Sir Charles Lloyd, 1st Baronet of Maesyfelin
- 1691: Richard Lloyd, of Mabws
- 1692: Daniel Evans of Peterwell
- 1693: Richard Stedman of the Abbey
- 1694: David Lloyd, of Crynvrin
- 1695: Francis Vaughan, of Glanlery
- 1696: Vaughan Pryse, of Cilcennin, later Sir Vaughan Pryse, baronet
- 1697: Hugh Lloyd, of Lloyd Jack
- 1698: John Knolls, of Ynishir
- 1699: Roderick Richards, of Aberystwyth
- 1700: John Phillips of Cwm Owen

=== 18th century ===
- 1701: Richard Lewis of Alltvadog
- 1702: Lewis Gwynne of Mynachty
- 1703: Richard Phillips of Moelivor
- 1704: Morgan Howells of Pen-y-bayly
- 1705: Thomas Johnes of Llanfair-Clydogau
- 1706: John Lloyd of Llangennech
- 1707: Thomas Lloyd of Cillrhewie, Pembrokeshire
- 1708: Nathan Griffiths of Mountain Hall, Carnarvonshire
- 1709: John Jones of Abermade
- 1710: David Lloyd of Llanvechan
- 1711: John Lewis, of Gernos
- 1712: Rhys David Morris of Blane Duffryn
- 1713: Morgan Lloyd of Abertrinant
- 1714: Hugh Lloyd of Aberllolwyn
- 1715: John Jones of Rhoscellan
- 1716: Thomas Hughes of Hendrevelin
- 1717: Richard Morris of Garrrog
- 1718: David Lloyd of Lloyd Jack
- 1719: Thomas Knolles of Wenallt, Pembrokeshire
- 1720: Stephen Parry of Rhodonaydde
- 1721: Edward Lloyd of Wern
- 1722: Walter Lloyd of Coedmore
- 1723: James Griffiths, of Noyadd Llanarth
- 1724: David Jones, of Penyrallt (died in office)
- 1725: William Williams, of Dolegoch
- 1726: David Lewis, of Gernos
- 1727: Lewis Lewis, of Dole clethor
- 1728: John Jones, of Tyglyn
- 1729: Edward Jones of Llanina
- 1730: John Lewis of Carmarthenshire
- 1731: John Lloyd, of Cilgwyn
- 1732: John Price, of Blaneduffrin
- 1733: Thomas Lloyd, of Bronwith
- 1734: David James, (or Jones) of Tyglyn
- 1735: William Brigstocke, of Blaenpant
- 1736: Robert Dyer, of Aberglasne, Carmarthenshire
- 1737: Thomas Jones of Abermarles
- 1738: Francis Ingram, of Glanlery
- 1739: John, Phillips, of Cringa, Carmarthenshire
- 1740: Thomas Jones, of Verdre bach
- 1741: Daniel Bowen, of Wyan Ivor
- 1742: Thomas Lewis, of Alltyrodin
- 1743: David Lloyd, of Alltyrodin
- 1744: Charles Gwynne, of Mynachty
- 1745: David Parry, of Noyadd Trefawr
- 1746: Sir Lucius Christianus Lloyd of Maesyfelin
- 1747: William Lewis, of Llanlase
- 1748: David Jones, of Penrallt
- 1749: Lewis Pryse, of Abernant Bychan
- 1750: John Morgan
- 1751: William Williams, of Pant Seiri
- 1752: John Lewis, of Llanllear
- 1753: Lewis Rogers of Gelly
- 1754: John Edwards, of Abermeyrick
- 1755: William Bowen, of Troedyraur
- 1756: Lewis Lloyd, of Gernos
- 1757: John Griffiths of Penpontpren
- 1758: Abel Griffiths of Pantybettws
- 1759: George Price, of Llangrannog
- 1760: Thomas Hughes, of Hendrefelin
- 1761: Walter Lloyd, of Coedmore
- 1762: David Lloyd, of Brainog
- 1763: John Paynter, tenant of Havod Ychtryd
- 1764: Thomas Jones of Noyadd
- 1765: Thomas Evans of Blanegwenog
- 1766: William Jones of Dol y Clettwr
- 1767: Richard Morgan of Llysvane (died in office)
- 1768: Daniel Lloyd of Lagues, Carmarthenshire
- 1769: John Hugh of Tymawr
- 1770: Roderick Richards of Penglais
- 1771: Lewis Gwynne of Mynachty
- 1772: Llewellyn Parry of Cernos Cwmcynon
- 1773: David Jones of Derry Ormond
- 1774: Thomas Lloyd of Abertrinant
- 1775: Edward Vaughan of Greengrove
- 1776: Nathaniel Williams of Pant Sherry
- 1777: David Edward Lewis of Dolehidd
- 1778: Thomas Bowen of Waynyvor
- 1779: Thomas Price of Cardigan
- 1780: Henry Jones of Ty-glyn
- 1781: David Lloyd of Alltyrodin
- 1782: Herbert Evans of Lowmead
- 1783: John Beynon of Trewern, Pembrokeshire
- 1784: William Williams of Trevach
- 1785: Thomas Powell of Nanteos Mansion
- 1786: Edward Price Lloyd of Llansevin, Carmarthenshire
- 1787: John Martin of Allgoch
- 1788: John Vaughan of Trewinsor
- 1789: John Jones of Derry Ormond
- 1790: Matthew Davies of Wilevrog
- 1791: David Hughes of Veinog
- 1792: William Lewis of Llanerchairon
- 1793: Thomas Lloyd of Bronwydd
- 1794: William Owen Brigstocke of Blaen-y-pant
- 1795: Sir Thomas Bonsall, Kt. of Fronfraith
- 1796: Edward Warren Jones of Llanina
- 1797: J. Nathan Taylor of Stradmore
- 1798: Thomas Lloyd, of Coedmore (replacing Pryce Loveden)
- 1799: Pryse Loveden Pryse of Gogerddan
- 5 February 1800: Thomas Lloyd, of Cilgwyn

=== 19th century ===
- 11 February 1801: John Palmer Chichester, of Llanbadarn Fawr
- 18 February 1801: Robert Lloyd, of Abermaid
- 17 March 1801: John Williams, of Castle Hill
- 17 February 1802: David Davies, of Glanroca
- 3 February 1803: John Lloyd, of Mabws
- 1 February 1804: John Bond, of Cefn Coed
- 6 February 1805: Henry Greswold Lewis, of Llwyngrewis
- 21 February 1805: John Lloyd Williams, of Gwernant
- 1 February 1806: Lewis Bayly Wallis, of Peterwell
- 4 February 1807: Thomas Smith, of Foelallt
- 3 February 1808: Morgan Jones, of Panthyrlis
- 6 February 1809: William Skyrme, of Alltgoch
- 31 January 1810: William Edward Powell, of Nanteos Mansion
- 8 February 1811: John Brooks, of Neuadd, Llanarth
- 24 January 1812: Griffith Jones, of Cardigan
- 10 February 1813: Roderick Eardley Richardes, of Penglais
- 4 February 1814: Thomas Lloyd, of Bronwydd
- 13 February 1815: Herbert Evans, of Highmead
- 17 March 1815: John Nathaniel Williams of Castle Hill, near Aberystwyth
- 1816: Thomas Lloyd of Coedmore
- 1817: Jenkin Davies of Glanroca
- 1818: John Jones of Derry Ormond
- 1819: George Jeffreys of Glandyfi Castle, Llandovery, Carmarthenshire
- 1820: Henry Rogers of Gelli
- 1821: John Vaughan Lloyd of Tyllwyd
- 1822: Thomas Lewis Lloyd of Nantgwillt
- 1823: George William Parry of Llidiardau
- 1824: John Scandrett Harford of Blaise Castle, Gloucestershire and Falcondale
- 1825: Edward Pryse Lloyd of Wern-newydd
- 1826: Thomas Davies
- 1827: Arthur Jones
- 1828: John Griffiths of Llwyndurus
- 1829: Morris Davies, of Aberystwith
- 1830: Thomas Hugh Jones, of Noyadd
- 1830: Benjamin Hall of Cilgwyn
- 1831: John Palmer Bruce Chichester of Llanbadarn Fawr
- 1832: Henry Lewis Edwardes Gwynne, of Lanlery
- 1833: William Owen Brigstocke, of Blaenpant
- 1834: Charles Richard Longcroft, of Llanina
- 1835: Thomas Davies, of Nantgwilan
- 1836: George Bowen Jordan Jordan, of Pigeonsford
- 1837: John Hughes, of Alltylwyd
- 1838: William Tilsley Jones, of Gwynfryn
- 1839: George Lawrence Vaughan, of Cwmnwydion
- 1840: John William Lewis, of Llanarchayron
- 1841: David Davies, of Cardigan
- 1842: Francis David Saunders, of Tymawr
- 1843: Francis Thomas Gibb, of Hendrefelen
- 1844: John Philipps Allen Lloyd Philipps, of Maybus
- 1845: John Lloyd Davies, of Alltyroden
- 1846: James Davies, of Trefechan, Aberystwyth
- 1847: Matthew Davies, of Tanybwlch
- 1848: James Bowen, of Troed-yr-aur
- 1849: Henry Hoghton, of Hafod
- 1850: Thomas Davies Lloyd, of Bronwydd
- 1851: Ernest Vaughan, 4th Earl of Lisburne
- 1852: John Inglis Jones, of Derry Ormond, was initially appointed, but was replaced by Alban Lewis Gwynne, of Monachty
- 1853: Lewis Pugh, of Aberystwith
- 1854: Morgan Jones, of Penlan
- 1855: John Battersby Harford, of Peterwell
- 1856: Thomas Henry Winwood, of Tyglyn Aeron
- 1857: John Propert, of Blaenpistill, near Cardigan
- 1858: Thomas Hughes, of Noyadd Fawr
- 1859: William Price Lewes, of Llysnewydd, near New Castle Emlyn
- 1860: William Jones, of Glandennis, near Lampeter
- 1861: Sir Pryse Loveden, of Gogerddan
- 1862: Herbert Vaughan, of Brynog
- 1863: Price Lewis, of Gwastod, near Lampeter
- 1864: John George Parry Hughes, of Alltlwyd
- 1865: Lt-Col. John Lewes, of Llanlear
- 1866: John George William Bonsall of Fronfraith
- 1867: James Loxdale, of Castle Hill, near Aberystwith
- 1868: Alban Thomas Davies, of Tyglyn Aeron
- 1869: Caulfield Tynte Lloyd Williams. of Gwernant Park
- 1870: Herbert Davies Evans, of Highmead, Lampeter
- 1871: Sydney Henry Jones Parry, of Tyllwyd, near Newcastle Emlyn
- 1872: John Edwardes Rogers of Abermeirig
- 1873: William Buck of Stradmore, in Llandyssil
- 1874: David Thomas of Llanfair
- 1875: Matthew Vaughan-Davies of Tan-y-bwlch
- 1876: George Griffiths Williams of Wallog
- 1877: Thomas Ford Hughes of Abercerry
- 1878: Ernest Augustus Mallet, 5th Earl of Lisburne, of Crosswood
- 1879: Thomas Parry Horsman of Castle Howell
- 1880: George Ernest John Powell, of Nanteos Mansion
- 1881: Sir Marteine Lloyd, 2nd Baronet, of Bronwydd
- 1882: Charles Lloyd of Waunifor
- 1883: Thomas Henry Ricketts Winwood of Wellingsford Manor, Somerset. (The only surviving son of the late Thomas Henry Winwood, J.P., of Tygyln Ayron.)
- 1884: Charles Home Lloyd Fitzwilliams of Cilgwyn
- 1885: George Williams Parry of Llydiardau
- 1886: John Charles Harford of Blaise Castle, Gloucestershire and Falcondale House, Lampeter
- 1887: Thomas Hugh Rice Hughes of Neuadd-fawr
- 1888: James Stewart of Alltyrodyn, Llandysul
- 1889: Ernest George Henry Arthur, 6th Earl of Lisburne, Crosswood
- 1890: John Thomas Morgan, of Nantceirio Hnll, Aberystwith
- 1891: Wilmot Inglis Jones, of Derry Ormond
- 1892: Thomas James Waddingham, of Hafod, Ystradmeurig
- 1893: John Francis, of Wallog, Bow Street
- 1894: Price Lewes, of Tyglyn Aeron, Cilie Aeron
- 1895: David Jones Lloyd, of Gilfachwen, Llandysul
- 1896: William Jones, of Ffosheulog, Tregaron
- 1897: Colonel William Price Lewes of Llysnewydd, Llandyssil.
- 1898: Sir James Weeks Szlumper, Kt. of Sandmarsh, Aberystwith
- 1899: James Jones, of Cefenllwyd, Penrhyncoch, Aberystwith
- 1900: Abraham Garrod Thomas of Panteryrod, Llanarth

=== 20th century ===
- 1901: Edward Walter David Evans, of Camnant Hall, Llandysul
- 1902: Robert Davies Roberts, of Cambridge and Aberystwyth
- 1903: Major James Barry Taunton of Brynellen and Ynishir Hall
- 1904: Major John Joseph Bonsall, of Fronfraith, Aberystwyth
- 1905: Edward Roberts, of Oakfield Hale, Altrincham
- 1906: David Charles Roberts, of Aberystwyth
- 1907: Sir John Lynn-Thomas of Cwmgefeile, Llandysul
- 1908: Sir Edward John Webley-Parry-Pryse, 2nd Baronet of Aberystwyth
- 1909: Augustus Brigstocke of Blaenpant, Boncath
- 1910: John Thomas, of Vrondolau, New Quay
- 1911: George Fossett Roberts of Aberystwith
- 1912: John Humphreys Davies
- 1913: Major Charles Herbert Davis Cass of Do1-llan, Llandysul
- 1914: Richard Evan Jones of Cambrian Terrace, Borth
- 1915: William Lewes of Llys-newydd, Henllan
- 1916: Herbert Millichamp Vaughan of Llangoedmor
- 1917: Cecil Wright
- 1918: Evan Jones of Tanygroes
- 1919: Charles William Webley Hope of Pigeonsford, Llangranog
- 1920: Frederick Dundas Harford of Falcondale House and Holme Hall, Holme, Yorkshire
- 1921: John Thomas Lewis of Gwynfryn, Llanarth
- 1922: Lewis James Mathias of Bronpadarn, Aberystwith
- 1925: Arthur Vyvyan Lloyd-Jones of Penyrallt, Pentrecourt
- 1929: Dr Walter Ernest LLewellyn Davies - Abernant, Llanidloes (Cwrtmawr, Llangeitho)
- 1938: Sir George Timothy Harford, 2nd Baronet of Falcondale, Cardiganshire
- 1939: Colonel Bertie Taylor Lloyd, of 20 Great Darkgate Street, Aberystwyth
- 1941: John Cayo Evans
- 1942: Major John Edwards of Kingston Hill, Surrey
- 1943: Joseph Barclay Jenkins of Henley of Aberystwyth
- 1944: Thomas Iorwerth Ellis of Aberystwyth
- 1945: Lieut.-Colonel Ethelbert Harewood Williams, of Waungelod, Cardigan
- 1946: Thomas Bronant Jones, of Ffosyffyn, Bronant, Llanilar, near Aberystwyth.
- 1947: Robert Yates Bickerstaff, of Moseley, Birmingham and of Minyfron, North Road, Aberystwyth.
- 1948: Evan Alwyn Rhys Lloyd, of Tynbwlch, Llanddeiniol, Llanrhystyd, Cardigan
- 1949: Thomas Arnold Lewis, of Ingledene, Aberayron, Cardiganshire
- 1950: Sir Ifan Ab Owen Edwards, of Bryneithyn, Llanfarian, Cardiganshire.
- 1951: Jenkin Alban Davies, of Brynawelon, Llanrhystyd, Cardiganshire
- 1952: Major Edward Davies-Thomas, of Birmingham and of 22, Eastgate, Aberystwyth, Cardiganshire
- 1953: Lieut.-Colonel Isaac Rowland James, of Sketty, Glamorganshire and Peithyll, Aberystwyth, Cardiganshire.
- 1954: William Morgan Davies, of Brynteify, Llanio Road, Tregaron, Cardiganshire
- 1955: Peter Williams Edwards, of Market Drayton, Shropshire and sometime of The Laurels, Aberystwyth
- 1956: John Stanley Alban Davies, of Hampshire Lodge, Walthamstow and of Brynawelon, Llanrhystyd
- 1957: Lieut.-Colonel Richard Evan Isaac, of Victoria Marine Terrace, Aberystwyth
- 1958: Basil Parry Griffiths, of Wallog, Clarach, Aberystwyth
- 1959: William Evans, of Tyndomen, Tregaron
- 1960: Professor Thomas Jones Pierce, of Brynhyfryd, Talybont
- 1961: Captain Charles Frazer Harrington, of Ffynnon-cadno, Ponterwyd, near Aberystwyth.
- 1962: Dr. George Sinclair Ross Little, of Cadwgan, Gwbert-on-Sea.
- 1963: Evan Glyn Davies, of Felindre Mills, Aberarth.
- 1964: Major-General Lewis Owain Pugh, of Cymerau, Glandyfi.
- 1965: Brigadier Eric Malcolm Davies-Jenkins, of Llwyncynnon, Llanbadarn Fawr, Aberystwyth.
- 1966: Dr. Hugh Herbert, of Tanyfron, Aberayron.
- 1967: Major William Herbert Rhydian Llewellyn, of Brynreithyn Ffair Rhos, Ystrad Meurig.
- 1968: Major James Smith Mirylees of Nanteos, Aberystwyth.
- 1969: Dr. David Rowland Edwards of Ty Gwyn, St David's Road, Aberystwyth.
- 1970: James Edward Raw-Rees, of Maes-Awelon, Waun Fawr, Aberystwyth.
- 1971: Gladys Mary Fraser of Llanfair, Llandysul.
- 1972: Henry Robert Read, of Myrtleville, St. David's Road, Aberystwyth.
- 1973: David Gareth Raw-Rees, of Tynparc, Llandre, Bow Street.
- 1974 onwards - See High Sheriff of Dyfed

== See also ==
- High Sheriff of Dyfed
