= Richard Pryse (of Gogerddan) =

Welsh politician

Sir Richard Pryse (died 7 February 1623) was a Welsh politician who sat in the House of Commons from 1584.

Pryse was the eldest son of John Pryse of Gogerddan. He became a student of the Inner Temple in November 1583. In 1584, he was elected Member of Parliament for Cardiganshire. He was High Sheriff of Cardiganshire in 1585. In 1589 he was elected MP for Cardiganshire again. He was elected MP for Cardiganshire again in 1593 and in 1601. On 7 July 1602, he was appointed a member of the Council of Marches. He was knighted in July 1603. In 1604 he was High Sheriff of Cardiganshire again and on 17 April 1604, the House of Commons ordered him to be sent for by their Serjeant to answer his proceedings as Sheriff of the county at the Cardigan election. He was elected MP for Cardiganshire again in 1614 and 1621.

Pryse died in 1623, and was buried in Llanbadarnfawr Church.

Pryse married Gwenllian Pryse daughter of Thomas Pryse ap Morris ap Owain ap Evan Blaney or Blaen of Aberbychan, Montgomeryshire. His grandson Richard was created a baronet.

Parliament of England
Preceded by John Pryse	Member of Parliament for Cardiganshire; 1584	Succeeded by Griffith Lloyd
Preceded by Griffith Lloyd	Member of Parliament for Cardiganshire; 1588–1593	Succeeded by Thomas Pryse
Preceded by Thomas Pryse	Member of Parliament for Cardiganshire; 1601	Succeeded by Sir John Lewis
Preceded by Sir John Lewis	Member of Parliament for Cardiganshire; 1614–1622	Succeeded by James Lewis
