= Christopher John =

Christopher John may refer to:

- Chris John (politician), American politician
- Christopher John (footballer), Nigerian footballer

== See also ==
- Chris John (disambiguation)
