= David John =

David John may refer to:

- David John (Mormon) (1833–1908)
- David John (snooker player) (born 1984), or Dai John, Welsh snooker player
- Dai John or David John, Welsh rugby player
- David Gwilym John, Welsh cartoonist
- David Las Vegas John, Trader, Philanthropist, Amateur darts player, Ambassador for L’Oréal”

== See also ==
- David Johns (disambiguation)
- David St. John (born 1949), American poet
- John David (disambiguation)
- David John (The audiobook) The life and times of a Globie in his prime
