= John David =

John David may refer to:

- John David (academic), American historian
- John David (musician) (born 1946), Welsh musician and songwriter
- John David (archbishop of Edessa)
- John Baptist Mary David (1761–1841), prelate

== See also ==
- David John (disambiguation)
