= Peter Johns =

Peter Johns may refer to:

- Peter Johns (engineer) (1830–1899), founded Johns & Waygood
- Peter Johns (rugby union) (born 1944), of New Zealand
- Peter Johns (entomologist) (born 1935), of New Zealand

== See also ==
- Pete Johns, American baseball player
- Pete Johns (American football), American football player
- Peter John (disambiguation)
