= Jennifer Elliott =

Australian professional golfer

Personal information
- Full name: Jennifer Herbst Elliott
- Nationality: Australia
- Born: c. 2001 South Africa
- Height: 5 ft 7 in (170 cm)

Career
- Sport: Golf
- College: Sam Houston State University
- Turned professional: 2025
- Current tour: Annika Women’s All-Pro Tour

Best results in LPGA major championships
- Chevron Championship: DNP
- Women's PGA C'ship: DNP
- U.S. Women's Open: CUT: 2025
- Women's British Open: DNP
- Evian Championship: DNP

Jennifer Herbst Elliott (born c. 2001) is an Australian professional golfer. A collegiate golfer at Sam Houston State University, Elliott turned professional in 2025. She made her major tournament debut at the 2025 U.S. Women's Open.

== Early life ==
Jennifer Herbst was born in South Africa and moved with her family to Perth, Australia when she was seven years old. At age 12, she joined the Lake Karrinyup Country Club and began playing golf.

== Amateur career ==
Herbst represented Western Australia in amateur golf competitions from 2013 to 2016, while attending Kingsway Christian College.

In 2020, Herbst signed with Sam Houston State University in Texas to play collegiate golf. In her first year at Sam Houston, Herbst was named Western Conference Newcomer of the Year. As a sophomore, Herbst led the women's golf team with a 70.89 scoring average over nine rounds. In 2022, she was named the Western Athletic Conference's Player of the Year. At the culmination of the 2023–2024 season, she was named to the First Team All-Conference. In her final year at Sam Houston, the women's golf team won the 2024 Conference USA Championship at High Meadow Ranch Golf Club, and Herbst earned all-tournament honors.

== Professional career ==
Elliott turned professional in 2025, competing on the Annika Women’s All-Pro Tour. Outside of competing, she works at the Grand Pines Country Club in Montgomery, Texas. After marrying in April 2025, Herbst competes under her married name, Jennifer Elliott.

In May 2025, Elliott earned a berth at the 2025 U.S. Women's Open after qualifying in an event at the Bentwater Yacht & Country Club with an 8-under par result. The 2025 Women's Open was her major tournament debut.

== Results in LPGA majors ==
Tournament	2025
Chevron Championship	
U.S. Women's Open	CUT
Women's PGA Championship	
The Evian Championship	
Women's British Open	

Did not play

CUT = missed the half-way cut
