= James Lewis (MP for Cardiganshire) =

Welsh politician

James Lewis (born 1601) was a Welsh politician who sat in the House of Commons at various times between 1624 and 1656. He supported the Royalist and then the Parliamentary side in the English Civil War.

Lewis was the son of Sir John Lewis of Abaernant-bychen and his wife Bridget Pryse, daughter of Sir Richard Pryse. He matriculated at Jesus College, Oxford on 14 March 1617, aged 15. In 1624, Lewis was elected Member of Parliament for Cardiganshire in the Short Parliament. He was re-elected MP for Cardiganshire in 1625, 1626 and 1628 and sat until 1629 when King Charles decided to rule without parliament for eleven years.

Lewis was re-elected MP for Cardiganshire in April 1640 for the Short Parliament. He was a Royalist at the beginning of the Civil War, but in January 1645 was appointed one of the sequestration committee for Cardigan, Pembroke and Carmarthen Counties. He was Colonel in a regiment of the parliamentary army and captured Newcastle Emlyn for parliament in December 1645. His regiment was ordered to be disbanded in March 1648 though it was retained a little longer.

Information was laid against him on 12 February 1649 that he had fought originally for the king, had protected Royalists when on the sequestration committee and his regiment had cost the state £50,000. An order was made for his discharge on 15 March 1649 under the general act of pardon for South Wales.

He was re-elected MP for Cardiganshire in 1656 for the Second Protectorate Parliament.

After the Restoration he was nominated for the honour of Knight of the Royal Oak. He was High Sheriff of Cardiganshire in 1664. He was described as "a person of inoffensive, facile constitution, forced from a Royalist to act as a colonel for King and Parliament: seldom out of publique offices, though averse to undertake any; loved more for doing no wrong, than for doing of any good".

Parliament of England
Preceded by Sir Richard Pryse	Member of Parliament for Cardiganshire; 1624–1629	Parliament suspended until 1640
Vacant Parliament suspended since 1629	Member of Parliament for Cardiganshire; 1640	Succeeded by Walter Lloyd
Preceded by Col James Philipps	Member of Parliament for Cardiganshire; 1656; With: John Clark	Succeeded by Col James Philipps
