= Chris Johns =

Chris Johns may refer to:

- Chris Johns (darts player) (born 1958), Welsh darts player
- Chris Johns (photographer) (born 1951), American photographer
- Chris Johns (rugby league) (born 1964), Australian rugby league footballer
- Chris Johns (footballer) (born 1995), Northern Irish footballer.

== See also ==
- Chris John (disambiguation)
