= Hailee Cooper =

American professional golfer (born 1999)

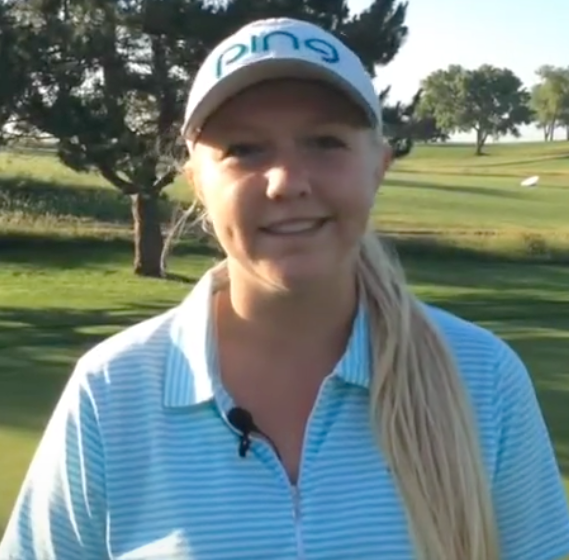
- Cooper in a 2016 interview

Personal information
- Nationality: United States
- Born: December 21, 1999 (age 26)

Career
- Sport: Golf
- Turned professional: 2024
- Current tour: LPGA Tour
- Former tours: Epson Tour; Annika Women's All Pro Tour
- Professional wins: 3

Best results in LPGA major championships
- Chevron Championship: DNP
- Women's PGA C'ship: DNP
- U.S. Women's Open: T7: 2025
- Women's British Open: DNP
- Evian Championship: DNP

Hailee Cooper (born December 21, 1999) is an American professional golfer from Montgomery, Texas. In 2024 she turned professional and joined the Epson Tour. In 2018, Cooper made her LPGA Tour debut at the 2018 U.S. Women's Open where she made the cut, finishing 55th.

== Amateur career ==
Cooper was introduced to the sport of golf early, reportedly first holding a golf grip at three days old. By age 10 she was fully committed to the sport, placing fifth in the Southern Texas Professional Golfers’ Association Junior Tournament. By 12, her talent was being spotted by college coaches. She won the Texas State golf championships during her first year of high school. In high school, Cooper was a five-time AJGA Rolex All-American and named one of the top prospects in the Class of 2018. In 2016, Cooper won the 2016 U.S. Women's Amateur Four-Ball title with partner Kaitlyn Papp. She was signed by the University of Texas to play on the women's golf team. Prior to starting at Texas, in 2018 Cooper made her first appearance in the LPGA tour at the 2018 U.S. Women's Open. Her father served as her caddie. Cooper made the cut and finished 55th in the event.

At Texas, Cooper earned Big 12 Freshman of the Year honors and led the team in scoring. During her sophomore year, Cooper's game was impacted by the onset of the COVID-19 pandemic, which cancelled the remainder of the season. After three years at Texas, in 2021, Cooper transferred to Texas A&M University, where she "rediscovered" her love of the game under coach Gerrod Chadwell. Cooper played two seasons at A&M, where the Aggies went to the NCAA semifinals twice and then won the 2023 SEC Championship.

== Professional career ==
In 2024, Cooper joined the Annika Women's All Pro Tour (WAPT) and then the Epson Tour. On the Epson Tour, she made 11 cuts in 12 starts, and four top-10 results. On the WAPT, she won three times. In April at the L'Auberge Lake Charles Championship; in May at the Oscar Williams Classic at Hurricane Creek; and in August at the Heritage Classic with a 9-under 63 result, earning enough points to enter into LPGA qualifying tournaments.

In 2025, Cooper made the cut in her first seven appearances on the Epson Tour. Cooper qualified for the 2025 U.S. Women's Open in April after a qualifying round at the Canyon Creek Country Club in Richardson, Texas. In May, Cooper placed fourth in the Copper Rock Championship, equaling the tournament record in her opening day.

Heading into the U.S. Open tournament, Cooper was in eighth place in the Race-for-the-Card point standings. Cooper's performance at the U.S. Women's Open stood out, as she shot a 1-under 71 in the opening round of the tournament. After the second round, Cooper made the cut. She finished tied for 7th. She ultimately finished 10th in the Epson Tour rankings to graduate to the LPGA Tour for 2026.

== Amateur wins ==
- 2013 Junior All-Star at Gray Plantation
- 2014 Collegiate Preview, Texas State Junior Championship, Goodman Networks Junior at Timarron, Under Armour-Jordan Speith Championship
- 2015 Collegiate Preview, Bishops Gate Golf Academy Junior at Horseshoe Bay,
- 2016 AJGA Kansas Junior at Buffalo Dunes, U.S. Women's Amateur Four-Ball
- 2017 Texas Women's Stroke Play
- 2018 Betsy Rawls Longhorn Invite
- 2019 Bruzzy Challenge

== Professional wins (3) ==
=== Annika Women's All Pro Tour (3) ===
- 2024 L'Auberge Lake Charles Championship, Oscar Williams Classic at Hurricane Creek, Heritage Classic

== U.S. national team appearances ==
- Junior Solheim Cup: 2015 (winners)
- Junior Ryder Cup: 2016 (winners)
- Arnold Palmer Cup: 2019

== Results in LPGA majors ==
Tournament	2025	2026
Chevron Championship		
U.S. Women's Open	T7	CUT
Women's PGA Championship		
The Evian Championship		
Women's British Open		

Top 10
Did not play

CUT = missed the half-way cut
T = tied
