= John Price (died 1602) =

Welsh politician

John Price (died 1602) was a Welsh politician.

He was the eldest son of Matthew Price of Newtown, Montgomeryshire.

He was elected a member (MP) of the Parliament of England for Montgomery Boroughs in 1563 and for Montgomeryshire in 1572. He was a justice of the peace for Montgomeryshire from c.1564 and was appointed High Sheriff of Montgomeryshire for 1565–66. He was also High Sheriff of Cardiganshire for 1569–70. From 1588 he was a deputy lieutenant for Montgomeryshire.

He married Elizabeth, the daughter of Rhys ap Morris ap Owain, of Aberbechan, near Newtown, with whom he had four sons and four daughters.
