= 2025 U.S. Women's Open =

Golf tournament

2025 U.S. Women's Open presented by Ally

Tournament information
- Dates: May 29 – June 1, 2025
- Location: Erin, Wisconsin, U.S. 43.245°N 88.395°W
- Course: Erin Hills
- Organized by: USGA
- Tour: LPGA Tour

Statistics
- Par: 72
- Length: 6,829 yards (6,244 m)
- Field: 156 players 60 after cut
- Cut: 145 (+1)
- Prize fund: $12,000,000
- Winner's share: $2,400,000

Champion
- (Sweden) Maja Stark
- 281 (−7)
- Location in the United States Location in Wisconsin

The 2025 U.S. Women's Open presented by Ally was the 80th U.S. Women's Open, played May 29 to June 1 at Erin Hills in Erin, Wisconsin.

== Venue ==
The course had previously hosted the 2017 U.S. Open.

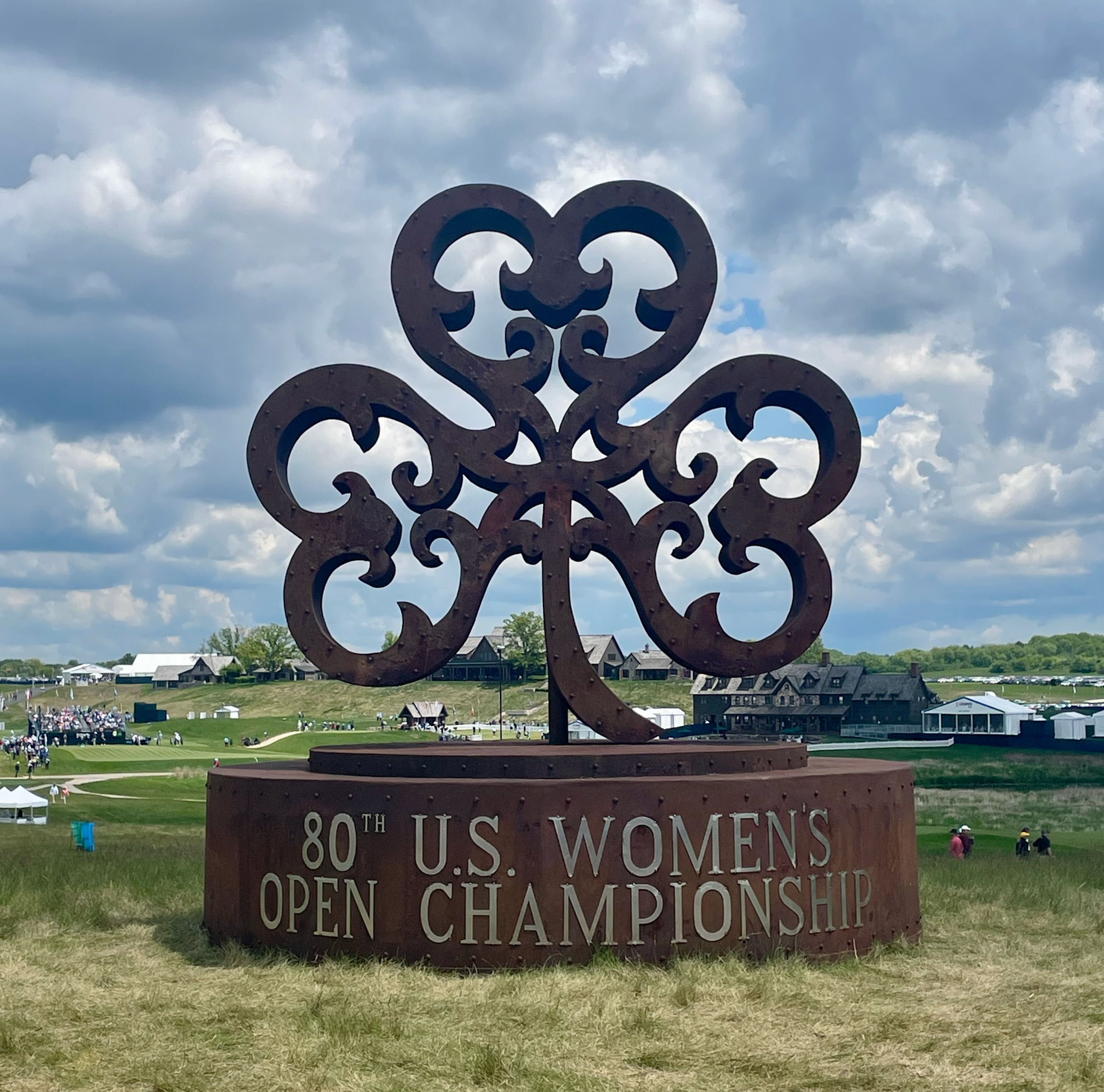

== Field ==
The field for the U.S. Women's Open is made up of players who gain entry through qualifying events and those who were exempt from qualifying. The exemption criteria included provision for recent major champions, winners of major amateur events, and leading players in the Women's World Golf Rankings.

The USGA accepted 1,904 entries for the championship.

=== Exemptions ===
This list details the exemption criteria for the 2025 U.S. Women's Open and the players exempt. Many players were exempt in multiple categories. (Note: (a) – denotes amateur)

1. Winners of the U.S. Women's Open for the last 10 years (2015–2024)

- Chun In-gee (7)
- Allisen Corpuz (17)
- Ariya Jutanugarn (17)
- Kim A-lim (10,11,16,17)
- Lee Jeong-eun
- Minjee Lee (2,8,16,17)
- Park Sung-hyun
- Yuka Saso (2,10,17)

2. From the 2024 U.S. Women's Open, the 10 lowest scorers and anyone tying for 10th place

- Ayaka Furue (8,10,11,16,17)
- Sakura Koiwai
- Andrea Lee
- Wichanee Meechai
- Hinako Shibuno
- Rio Takeda (11,16,17)
- Atthaya Thitikul (10,11,16,17)
- Arpichaya Yubol

3. Winner of the 2024 U.S. Senior Women's Open

- Leta Lindley

4. Winner of the 2024 U.S. Women's Amateur

- Rianne Malixi (5)

5. Winners of the 2024 U.S. Girls' Junior and U.S. Women's Mid-Amateur and the 2024 U.S. Women's Amateur runner-up (must be an amateur)

- Hana Ryskova
- Asterisk Talley

6. Winners of the Chevron Championship (2021–2025)

- Nelly Korda (7,10,11,17)
- Jennifer Kupcho (10,17)
- Mao Saigo (10,11,17)
- Patty Tavatanakit (10,17)
- Lilia Vu (9,10,11,17)

7. Winners of the Women's PGA Championship (2020–2024)

- Kim Sei-young (10,17)
- Amy Yang (11)
- Yin Ruoning (10,11,17)

8. Winners of The Evian Championship (2020–2024)

- Céline Boutier (10,17)
- Brooke Henderson (10,17)

9. Winners of the Women’s British Open (2020–2024)

- Ashleigh Buhai (17)
- Lydia Ko (10,11,16,17,19)
- Anna Nordqvist
- Sophia Popov

10. The top 30 point leaders from the 2024 LPGA Race to the CME Globe Final Points.

- An Na-rin
- Choi Hye-jin (17)
- Lauren Coughlin (11,17)
- Linn Grant (17)
- Hannah Green (11,17)
- Nataliya Guseva (17)
- Nasa Hataoka (17)
- Im Jin-hee (17)
- Megan Khang (17)
- Ko Jin-young (16,17)
- Ryu Hae-ran (11,17)
- Maja Stark (17)
- Chanettee Wannasaen (11,17)
- Angel Yin (11,17)
- Rose Zhang (17)

11. Winners of individual LPGA co-sponsored events, whose victories were considered official, from the conclusion of the 2024 U.S. Women's Open to the initiation of the 2025 U.S. Women's Open (only events that awarded a full point allocation for the Race to the CME Globe)

- Moriya Jutanugarn
- Kim Hyo-joo (16,17)
- Ingrid Lindblad
- Yealimi Noh (17)
- Madelene Sagström (17)
- Linnea Ström
- Thidapa Suwannapura

12. Winner of the 2025 Augusta National Women's Amateur (must be an amateur)

- Carla Bernat Escuder (a)

13. Winner of the 2024 Women's Amateur Championship (must be an amateur)

- Melanie Green forfeited her exemption by turning professional.

14. Winner of the 2024 Mark H. McCormack Medal (No. 1 in World Amateur Golf Ranking; must be an amateur)

- Lottie Woad (a)

15. Winner of the 2025 NCAA Division I Individual Golf Championship (must be an amateur)

- María José Marín (a)

16. From the 2025 Race to CME Globe, the top 10 point leaders as of April 3, 2025

17. From the current Women's World Golf Rankings, the top 75 players and anyone tying for 75th place as of March 24, 2025

- Pajaree Anannarukarn
- Bae So-hyun
- Carlota Ciganda
- Esther Henseleit
- Charley Hull
- Hwang You-min
- Akie Iwai
- Chisato Iwai
- Yui Kawamoto
- Kim Su-ji
- Shiho Kuwaki
- Stephanie Kyriacou
- Gaby López
- Ma Da-som
- Nanna Koerstz Madsen
- Leona Maguire
- Ro Seung-hui
- Gabriela Ruffels
- Sarah Schmelzel
- Jenny Shin
- Jiyai Shin
- Ai Suzuki
- Chiara Tamburlini
- Lexi Thompson
- Albane Valenzuela
- Miyū Yamashita
- Yoo Hyun-jo
- Ina Yoon

18. From the current Women's World Golf Rankings, the top 75 players and anyone tying for 75th place as of May 26, 2025 (if not previously exempt)

- Manon De Roey
- Lindy Duncan
- Lee Mi-hyang

19. Winner of the 2024 Olympic gold medal

20. Special exemptions

- None

=== Qualifying ===
Qualifying took place April 13 to May 24, 2024, via 36-hole stroke-play qualifiers at 26 different sites, 23 of them in the United States and one each in Italy, Canada and Japan.

| Date | Location | Venue | Field | Spots | Qualifiers |
|---|---|---|---|---|---|
| Apr 14 | Atlanta, Georgia | Druid Hills Golf Club | 78 | 3 | Abbey Daniel, Sophie Hausmann, Napat Lertsadwattana |
| Apr 17 | Richardson, Texas | Canyon Creek Country Club | 78 | 2 | Hailee Cooper, Isi Gabsa |
| Apr 21 | Sacramento, California | Del Paso Country Club | 84 | 3 | Leah John, Gabriella Kano (a), Sophia Lee (a) |
| Apr 21 | San Jacinto, California | Soboba Springs Golf Course | 78 | 2 | Amari Avery, Jude Lee (a) |
| Apr 22 | Chiba Prefecture, Japan | Boso Country Club | 132 | 5 | Nanoko Hayashi, Hinata Ikeba, Kotona Izumida, Aira Nagasawa (a), Pei-Ying Tsai |
| Apr 28 | Durham, North Carolina | Duke University Golf Club | 78 | 2 | Carolina López-Chacarra (a), Andie Smith (a) |
| Apr 28 | Belleville, Illinois | St. Clair Country Club | 78 | 2 | Brooke Biermann (a), Lauren Nguyen (a) |
| Apr 28 | New Smyrna Beach, Florida | Sugar Mill Country Club | 78 | 2 | Daniela Darquea, Farah O'Keefe (a) |
| Apr 28 | San Francisco, California | The Olympic Club | 84 | 3 | Sarah Lim (a), Paula Martín Sampedro (a), Emily Odwin (a) |
| Apr 29 | Milan, Italy | Golf Club Ambrosiano | 60 | 2 | Pia Babnik, Klára Spilková |
| Apr 30 | Springfield, Virginia | Springfield Golf & Country Club | 78 | 2 | Nicha Kanpai (a), Katie Li (a) |
| May 1 | New Albany, Ohio | New Albany Country Club | 82 | 3 | Kary Hollenbaugh (a), Anna Huang, Elina Sinz |
| May 5 | Phoenix, Arizona | Arizona Country Club | 71 | 2 | Hou Yu-Sang, Yani Tseng |
| May 5 | Peabody, Massachusetts | Salem Country Club | 30 | 1 | Celeste Dao |
| May 6 | Oradell, New Jersey | Hackensack Golf Club | 53 | 2 | Rayee Feng (a), Lee Jeong-eun |
| May 6 | Pittsburgh, Pennsylvania | Shannopin Country Club | 39 | 1 | Caley McGinty |
| May 7 | Montgomery, Texas | Bentwater Yacht & Country Club | 72 | 2 | Hanna Alberto, Jennifer Elliott |
| May 7 | Ojai, California | Soule Park Golf Club | 71 | 2 | Katelyn Kong (a), Ilhee Lee |
| May 9 | Honolulu, Hawaii | Honolulu Country Club | 29 | 1 | Saki Baba |
| May 9 | North Palm Beach, Florida | Lost Tree Club | 78 | 2 | Hsu Wei-ling, Dana Williams |
| May 12 | Elgin, Illinois | Elgin Country Club | 78 | 2 | Vanessa Borovilos (a), Kailie Vongsaga |
| May 12 | Coquitlam, British Columbia Canada | The Vancouver Golf Club | 44 | 1 | Kelly Tan |
| May 13 | Molalla, Oregon | Arrowhead Golf Club | 44 | 2 | Jeon Ji-won, Kiara Romero (a) |
| May 13 | Naples, Florida | Grey Oaks C.C. | 78 | 4 | Amanda Doherty, Gurleen Kaur, Auston Kim, Julia López Ramírez |
| May 13 | Prior Lake, Minnesota | The Meadows at Mystic Lake | 71 | 3 | Minami Katsu, Grace Kim, Jing Yan |
| May 13 | Westminster, Colorado | Walnut Creek Golf Preserve | 60 | 2 | Celine Borge, Pauline Roussin |

==== Alternates who gained entry ====
The following players gained a place in the field having finished as the leading alternates in the specified final qualifying events:

- Dottie Ardina (Phoenix)
- Gemma Dryburgh (Atlanta)
- Dana Fall (San Jacinto)
- María Fassi (Westminster)
- Hazuki Kimura (a) (Chiba Prefecture)
- Aline Krauter (Naples)
- Kim Métraux (Milan)
- Yuna Nishimura (Prior Lake)

== Round summaries ==
=== First round ===
Thursday, May 29, 2025

| Place | Player | Score | To par |
|---|---|---|---|
| T1 | (South Korea) Im Jin-hee | 68 | −4 |
| T1 | (South Korea) Kim A-lim | 68 | −4 |
| T1 | (Spain) Julia López Ramirez | 68 | −4 |
| T1 | (United States) Yealimi Noh | 68 | −4 |
| T1 | (Japan) Rio Takeda | 68 | −4 |
| T1 | (United States) Angel Yin | 68 | −4 |
| T7 | (Japan) Nasa Hataoka | 69 | −3 |
| T7 | (South Korea) Hwang You-min | 69 | −3 |
| T7 | (Japan) Chisato Iwai | 69 | −3 |
| T7 | (Japan) Yui Kawamoto | 69 | −3 |
| T7 | (Switzerland) Chiara Tamburlini | 69 | −3 |

=== Second round ===
Friday, May 30, 2025

| Place | Player | Score | To par |
|---|---|---|---|
| 1 | (Japan) Mao Saigo | 70-66=136 | −8 |
| T2 | (South Korea) Kim A-lim | 68-71=139 | −5 |
| T2 | (United States) Nelly Korda | 72-67=139 | −5 |
| T2 | (United States) Yealimi Noh | 68-71=139 | −5 |
| T2 | (United States) Sarah Schmelzel | 71-68=139 | −5 |
| T2 | (Japan) Hinako Shibuno | 70-69=139 | −5 |
| T2 | (Sweden) Maja Stark | 70-69=139 | −5 |
| T8 | (Sweden) Linn Grant | 71-69=140 | −4 |
| T8 | (South Korea) Im Jin-hee | 68-72=140 | −4 |
| T8 | (Switzerland) Chiara Tamburlini | 69-71=140 | −4 |
| T8 | (China) Jing Yan | 71-69=140 | −4 |

=== Third round ===
Saturday, May 31, 2025

| Place | Player | Score | To par |
|---|---|---|---|
| 1 | (Sweden) Maja Stark | 70-69-70=209 | −7 |
| 2 | (Spain) Julia López Ramírez | 68-74-68=210 | −6 |
| T3 | (Japan) Mao Saigo | 70-66-75=211 | −5 |
| T3 | (Japan) Hinako Shibuno | 70-69-72=211 | −5 |
| T3 | (Japan) Rio Takeda | 68-73-70=211 | −5 |
| 6 | (United States) Nelly Korda | 72-67-73=212 | −4 |
| T7 | (Sweden) Linn Grant | 71-69-73=213 | −3 |
| T7 | (Australia) Minjee Lee | 73-69-71=213 | −3 |
| T7 | (United States) Sarah Schmelzel | 71-68-74=213 | −3 |
| T10 | (Mexico) Gaby López | 70-73-71=214 | −2 |
| T10 | (United States) Yealimi Noh | 68-71-75=214 | −2 |
| T10 | (China) Yin Ruoning | 71-72-71=214 | −2 |

=== Final round ===
Sunday, June 1, 2025

Champion
Low amateur
(a) = amateur
(c) = past champion

| Place | Player | Score | To par | Money ($) |
|---|---|---|---|---|
| 1 | (Sweden) Maja Stark | 70-69-70-72=281 | −7 | 2,400,000 |
| T2 | (United States) Nelly Korda | 72-67-73-71=283 | −5 | 1,052,621 |
| T2 | (Japan) Rio Takeda | 68-73-70-72=283 | −5 | 1,052,621 |
| T4 | (South Korea) Choi Hye-jin | 71-70-75-68=284 | −4 | 486,262 |
| T4 | (Japan) Mao Saigo | 70-66-75-73=284 | −4 | 486,262 |
| T4 | (China) Yin Ruoning | 71-72-71-70=284 | −4 | 486,262 |
| T7 | (United States) Hailee Cooper | 71-72-72-70=285 | −3 | 358,004 |
| T7 | (Japan) Hinako Shibuno | 70-69-72-74=285 | −3 | 358,004 |
| T9 | (Sweden) Linn Grant | 71-69-73-73=286 | −2 | 281,341 |
| T9 | (Thailand) Ariya Jutanugarn (c) | 72-69-75-70=286 | −2 | 281,341 |
| T9 | (United States) Angel Yin | 68-75-73-70=286 | −2 | 281,341 |

Leaderboard below the top 10
| Place | Player | Score | To par | Money ($) |
|---|---|---|---|---|
| T12 | (Australia) Hannah Green | 72-70-73-72=287 | −1 | 229,198 |
| T12 | (England) Charley Hull | 72-73-71-71=287 | −1 | 229,198 |
| T14 | (South Korea) Ko Jin-young | 73-72-70-73=288 | E | 179,245 |
| T14 | (United States) Yealimi Noh | 68-71-75-74=288 | E | 179,245 |
| T14 | (United States) Sarah Schmelzel | 71-68-74-75=288 | E | 179,245 |
| T14 | (Switzerland) Chiara Tamburlini | 69-71-75-73=288 | E | 179,245 |
| T14 | (South Korea) Ina Yoon | 71-70-79-68=288 | E | 179,245 |
| T19 | (Mexico) Gaby López | 70-73-71-75=289 | +1 | 138,804 |
| T19 | (Spain) Julia López Ramírez | 68-74-68-79=289 | +1 | 138,804 |
| T19 | (Sweden) Madelene Sagström | 72-69-77-71=289 | +1 | 138,804 |
| T22 | (Germany) Esther Henseleit | 73-72-74-71=290 | +2 | 110,035 |
| T22 | (Japan) Chisato Iwai | 69-73-74-74=290 | +2 | 110,035 |
| T22 | (United States) Andrea Lee | 71-71-73-75=290 | +2 | 110,035 |
| T22 | (Australia) Minjee Lee (c) | 73-69-71-77=290 | +2 | 110,035 |
| T26 | (South Korea) Kim A-lim (c) | 68-71-77-75=291 | +3 | 91,570 |
| T26 | (New Zealand) Lydia Ko | 73-71-73-74=291 | +3 | 91,570 |
| T28 | (Germany) Aline Krauter | 73-69-73-77=292 | +4 | 82,017 |
| T28 | (France) Pauline Roussin | 71-74-75-72=292 | +4 | 82,017 |
| T28 | (China) Jing Yan | 71-69-75-77=292 | +4 | 82,017 |
| T31 | (United States) Allisen Corpuz (c) | 72-73-73-75=293 | +5 | 71,065 |
| T31 | (United States) Auston Kim | 73-69-77-74=293 | +5 | 71,065 |
| T31 | (Sweden) Anna Nordqvist | 76-69-73-75=293 | +5 | 71,065 |
| T31 | (England) Lottie Woad (a) | 72-70-76-75=293 | +5 | 0 |
| 35 | (Sweden) Ingrid Lindblad | 72-72-74-76=294 | +6 | 64,129 |
| T36 | (Japan) Saki Baba | 75-70-77-73=295 | +7 | 53,855 |
| T36 | (Russia) Nataliya Guseva | 75-70-79-71=295 | +7 | 53,855 |
| T36 | (Japan) Yui Kawamoto | 69-76-70-80=295 | +7 | 53,855 |
| T36 | (Spain) Carolina López-Chacarra (a) | 76-69-74-76=295 | +7 | 0 |
| T36 | (United States) Farah O'Keefe (a) | 72-71-77-75=295 | +7 | 0 |
| T36 | (South Korea) Ryu Hae-ran | 75-70-73-77=295 | +7 | 53,855 |
| T36 | (Japan) Miyū Yamashita | 71-74-77-73=295 | +7 | 53,855 |
| T36 | (South Korea) Amy Yang | 74-69-80-72=295 | +7 | 53,855 |
| T36 | (South Korea) Yoo Hyun-jo | 73-71-76-75=295 | +7 | 53,855 |
| T45 | (United States) Amari Avery | 71-73-76-76=296 | +8 | 39,232 |
| T45 | (France) Céline Boutier | 71-74-72-79=296 | +8 | 39,232 |
| T45 | (Germany) Sophie Hausmann | 72-73-79-72=296 | +8 | 39,232 |
| T45 | (Japan) Akie Iwai | 72-71-79-74=296 | +8 | 39,232 |
| T45 | (Japan) Sakura Koiwai | 72-72-79-73=296 | +8 | 39,232 |
| T45 | (United States) Kiara Romero (a) | 73-72-84-67=296 | +8 | 0 |
| T51 | (Scotland) Gemma Dryburgh | 72-69-78-78=297 | +9 | 31,334 |
| T51 | (United States) Rayee Feng (a) | 72-70-75-80=297 | +9 | 0 |
| T51 | (South Korea) Im Jin-hee | 68-72-79-78=297 | +9 | 31,334 |
| 54 | (South Korea) Chun In-gee (c) | 72-70-80-76=298 | +10 | 29,083 |
| 55 | (Colombia) María José Marín (a) | 73-72-77-77=299 | +11 | 0 |
| T56 | (South Korea) Hwang You-min | 69-72-81-78=300 | +12 | 27,501 |
| T56 | (Japan) Shiho Kuwaki | 70-75-79-76=300 | +12 | 27,501 |
| 58 | (Norway) Celine Borge | 72-72-84-75=303 | +15 | 26,527 |
| 59 | (Czech Republic) Klára Spilková | 73-71-76-84=304 | +16 | 26,041 |
| 60 | (Thailand) Wichanee Meechai | 72-73-82-80=307 | +19 | 25,797 |
| CUT | (Thailand) Pajaree Anannarukarn | 70-76=146 | +4 | |
| CUT | (South Africa) Ashleigh Buhai | 74-72=146 | +4 | |
| CUT | (Ecuador) Daniela Darquea | 73-73=146 | +4 | |
| CUT | (Chinese Taipei) Hsu Wei-ling | 72-74=146 | +4 | |
| CUT | (South Korea) Jeon Ji-won | 70-76=146 | +4 | |
| CUT | (South Korea) Ma Da-som | 71-75=146 | +4 | |
| CUT | (Denmark) Nanna Koerstz Madsen | 73-73=146 | +4 | |
| CUT | (Spain) Paula Martín Sampedro (a) | 72-74=146 | +4 | |
| CUT | (South Korea) Ro Seung-hui | 71-75=146 | +4 | |
| CUT | (Japan) Yuka Saso (c) | 74-72=146 | +4 | |
| CUT | (United States) Asterisk Talley (a) | 71-75=146 | +4 | |
| CUT | (Chinese Taipei) Yani Tseng | 75-71=146 | +4 | |
| CUT | (Thailand) Chanettee Wannasaen | 76-70=146 | +4 | |
| CUT | (United States) Rose Zhang | 76-70=146 | +4 | |
| CUT | (Slovenia) Pia Babnik | 73-74=147 | +5 | |
| CUT | (Japan) Nasa Hataoka | 69-78=147 | +5 | |
| CUT | (Thailand) Moriya Jutanugarn | 75-72=147 | +5 | |
| CUT | (United States) Jennifer Kupcho | 76-71=147 | +5 | |
| CUT | (United States) Jude Lee (a) | 72-75=147 | +5 | |
| CUT | (Sweden) Linnea Ström | 72-75=147 | +5 | |
| CUT | (Thailand) Atthaya Thitikul | 75-72=147 | +5 | |
| CUT | (United States) Lexi Thompson | 73-74=147 | +5 | |
| CUT | (South Korea) An Na-rin | 77-71=148 | +6 | |
| CUT | (Mexico) María Fassi | 76-72=148 | +6 | |
| CUT | (Japan) Minami Katsu | 72-76=148 | +6 | |
| CUT | (South Korea) Kim Hyo-joo | 75-73=148 | +6 | |
| CUT | (South Korea) Kim Su-ji | 77-71=148 | +6 | |
| CUT | (Republic of Ireland) Leona Maguire | 76-72=148 | +6 | |
| CUT | (Germany) Sophia Popov | 75-73=148 | +6 | |
| CUT | (United States) Kailie Vongsaga | 73-75=148 | +6 | |
| CUT | (Japan) Ayaka Furue | 75-74=149 | +7 | |
| CUT | (South Korea) Kim Sei-young | 78-71=149 | +7 | |
| CUT | (Australia) Stephanie Kyriacou | 74-75=149 | +7 | |
| CUT | (South Korea) Lee Il-hee | 73-76=149 | +7 | |
| CUT | (South Korea) Lee Jeong-eun | 79-70=149 | +7 | |
| CUT | (South Korea) Lee Mi-hyang | 75-74=149 | +7 | |
| CUT | (Switzerland) Albane Valenzuela | 74-75=149 | +7 | |
| CUT | (Spain) Carla Bernat Escuder (a) | 73-77=150 | +8 | |
| CUT | (Canada) Vanessa Borovilos (a) | 76-74=150 | +8 | |
| CUT | (Spain) Carlota Ciganda | 78-72=150 | +8 | |
| CUT | (Belgium) Manon De Roey | 73-77=150 | +8 | |
| CUT | (Japan) Nanoko Hayashi | 74-76=150 | +8 | |
| CUT | (Canada) Brooke Henderson | 75-75=150 | +8 | |
| CUT | (Japan) Kotona Izumida | 77-73=150 | +8 | |
| CUT | (Australia) Grace Kim | 72-78=150 | +8 | |
| CUT | (South Korea) Lee Jeong-eun (c) | 76-74=150 | +8 | |
| CUT | (England) Caley McGinty | 76-74=150 | +8 | |
| CUT | (Barbados) Emily Odwin (a) | 75-75=150 | +8 | |
| CUT | (Japan) Ai Suzuki | 72-78=150 | +8 | |
| CUT | (Thailand) Patty Tavatanakit | 76-74=150 | +8 | |
| CUT | (Chinese Taipei) Tsai Pei-ying | 75-75=150 | +8 | |
| CUT | (South Korea) Bae So-hyun | 77-74=151 | +9 | |
| CUT | (United States) Lindy Duncan | 74-77=151 | +9 | |
| CUT | (Germany) Isi Gabsa | 77-74=151 | +9 | |
| CUT | (United States) Kary Hollenbaugh (a) | 76-75=151 | +9 | |
| CUT | (Canada) Anna Huang | 74-77=151 | +9 | |
| CUT | (Thailand) Nicha Kanpai (a) | 74-77=151 | +9 | |
| CUT | (Australia) Gabriela Ruffels | 73-78=151 | +9 | |
| CUT | (South Korea) Jiyai Shin | 75-76=151 | +9 | |
| CUT | (Thailand) Thidapa Suwannapura | 76-75=151 | +9 | |
| CUT | (Thailand) Arpichaya Yubol | 72-79=151 | +9 | |
| CUT | (United States) Brooke Biermann (a) | 80-72=152 | +10 | |
| CUT | (United States) Lauren Coughlin | 76-76=152 | +10 | |
| CUT | (Chinese Taipei) Hou Yu-Sang | 74-78=152 | +10 | |
| CUT | (Japan) Yuna Nishimura | 79-73=152 | +10 | |
| CUT | (South Korea) Park Sung-hyun (c) | 77-75=152 | +10 | |
| CUT | (South Korea) Jenny Shin | 77-75=152 | +10 | |
| CUT | (United States) Elina Sinz | 80-72=152 | +10 | |
| CUT | (United States) Amanda Doherty | 78-75=153 | +11 | |
| CUT | (Thailand) Napat Lertsadwattana | 80-73=153 | +11 | |
| CUT | (United States) Katie Li (a) | 77-76=153 | +11 | |
| CUT | (Malaysia) Kelly Tan | 75-78=153 | +11 | |
| CUT | (United States) Hanna Alberto | 75-79=154 | +12 | |
| CUT | (Australia) Jennifer Elliott | 78-76=154 | +12 | |
| CUT | (Canada) Leah John | 79-75=154 | +12 | |
| CUT | (United States) Megan Khang | 77-77=154 | +12 | |
| CUT | (United States) Leta Lindley | 76-78=154 | +12 | |
| CUT | (Japan) Aira Nagasawa (a) | 76-78=154 | +12 | |
| CUT | (Czech Republic) Hana Ryskova (a) | 78-76=154 | +12 | |
| CUT | (United States) Andie Smith (a) | 78-76=154 | +12 | |
| CUT | (United States) Abbey Daniel | 78-77=155 | +13 | |
| CUT | (United States) Dana Fall | 74-81=155 | +13 | |
| CUT | (Japan) Hazuki Kimura (a) | 80-76=156 | +14 | |
| CUT | (United States) Katelyn Kong (a) | 81-75=156 | +14 | |
| CUT | (United States) Sarah Lim (a) | 76-81=157 | +15 | |
| CUT | (Philippines) Rianne Malixi (a) | 79-78=157 | +15 | |
| CUT | (Canada) Celeste Dao | 77-81=158 | +16 | |
| CUT | (United States) Gurleen Kaur | 78-80=158 | +16 | |
| CUT | (United States) Gabriella Kano (a) | 79-80=159 | +17 | |
| CUT | (Philippines) Dottie Ardina | 81-79=160 | +18 | |
| CUT | (Japan) Hinata Ikeba | 79-81=160 | +18 | |
| CUT | (United States) Sophia Lee (a) | 79-81=160 | +18 | |
| CUT | (Switzerland) Kim Métraux | 81-80=161 | +19 | |
| CUT | (United States) Lilia Vu | 80-82=162 | +20 | |
| CUT | (United States) Dana Williams | 80-84=164 | +22 | |
| CUT | (United States) Lauren Nguyen (a) | 86-81=167 | +25 | |

==== Scorecard ====
| Hole | 1 | 2 | 3 | 4 | 5 | 6 | 7 | 8 | 9 | 10 | 11 | 12 | 13 | 14 | 15 | 16 | 17 | 18 |
|---|---|---|---|---|---|---|---|---|---|---|---|---|---|---|---|---|---|---|
| Par | 5 | 4 | 4 | 4 | 4 | 3 | 5 | 4 | 3 | 4 | 4 | 4 | 3 | 5 | 4 | 3 | 4 | 5 |
| (Sweden) Stark | −7 | −7 | −7 | −7 | −7 | −8 | −7 | −7 | −7 | −7 | −8 | −8 | −8 | −9 | −9 | −9 | −8 | −7 |
| (United States) Korda | −5 | −5 | −5 | −5 | −5 | −4 | −5 | −6 | −6 | −6 | −6 | −6 | −5 | −6 | −6 | −6 | −6 | −5 |
| (Japan) Takeda | −5 | −6 | −6 | −6 | −4 | −4 | −4 | −4 | −4 | −4 | −5 | −5 | −5 | −6 | −6 | −6 | −5 | −5 |
| (South Korea) Choi | −1 | −1 | −1 | −2 | −2 | −3 | −4 | −4 | −3 | −3 | −4 | −4 | −4 | −5 | −5 | −5 | −5 | −4 |
| (Japan) Saigo | −6 | −6 | −6 | −6 | −6 | −6 | −6 | −6 | −5 | −5 | −5 | −4 | −4 | −4 | −4 | −4 | −4 | −4 |
| (China) Yin | −3 | −3 | −3 | −3 | −3 | −3 | −3 | −3 | −2 | −2 | −2 | −2 | −2 | −2 | −2 | −3 | −4 | −4 |

Cumulative tournament scores, relative to par

| Birdie | Bogey | Double bogey |
