= Thomas Johns =

Thomas Johns may refer to:

- Thomas Johnes (priest) (1749–1826), archdeacon of Barnstaple
- Thomas Johns (minister) (1836–1914), Welsh independent (Congregationalist) minister
- T.R. Johns (Thomas Richard Johns II, 1924–1988), American neurologist
- Lem Johns (Thomas Lemuel Johns, 1925–2014), member of the United States Secret Service
- Tommy Johns (Thomas Pearce Johns, 1851–1927), American baseball player

== See also ==
- Thomas Johnes (disambiguation)
