= Sir Richard Pryse, 2nd Baronet =

Welsh landowner and politician (c. 1630–c. 1675)

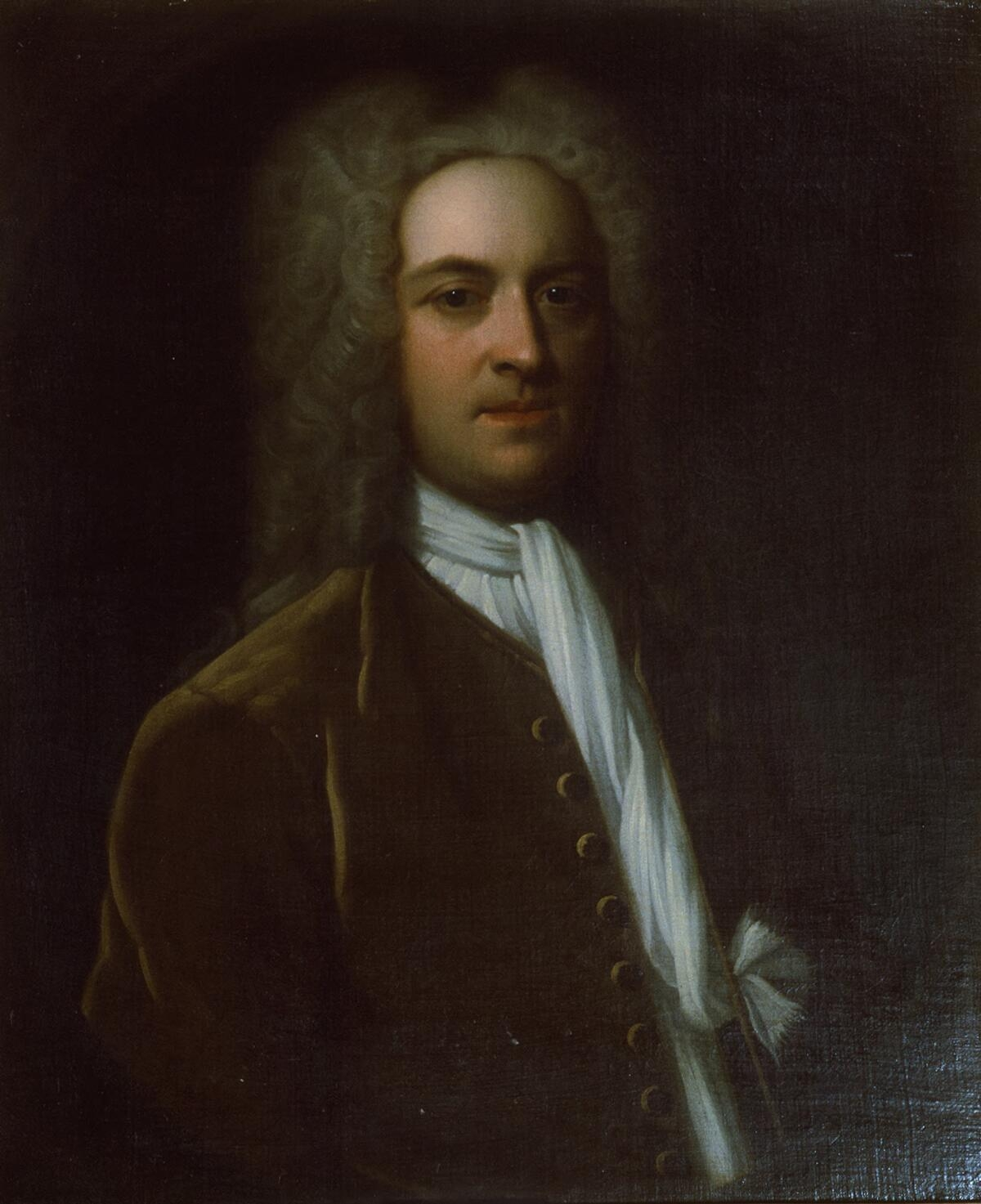

Sir Richard Pryse, 2nd Baronet (c. 1630 – c. 1675) was a Welsh landowner and politician who sat in the House of Commons in 1660.

Pryse was the eldest son of Sir Richard Pryse, 1st Baronet of Gogerddan, Cardiganshire and his first wife Hester, daughter of Sir Hugh Myddelton, 1st Baronet. He succeeded his father in the baronetcy in around 1651.

He served as a justice of the peace for Cardiganshire from 1652 to his death and was appointed High Sheriff of Cardiganshire for 1656–57. In 1660, he was elected Member of Parliament for Cardiganshire in the Convention Parliament.

He married Elizabeth, daughter of Sir Bulstrode Whitelocke. and his second wife Frances Willoughby. Pryse died without issue and was succeeded by his brother Thomas.

Baronetage of England
Preceded by Richard Pryse	Baronet (of Gogarthen); 1651–c. 1675	Succeeded by Thomas Pryse
