= Chris John =

Chris John may refer to:

- Chris John (boxer) (born 1979), Indonesian boxer
- Chris John (politician) (born 1960), American politician
- Chris John (rugby union) (born 1960), New Zealand rugby union player
- Chris John (entrepreneur) (born 1959), British businessman and rower
