= Thomas Johnes (the elder) =

Welsh politician (died c. 1734)

Thomas Johnes (died c. 1734) of Llanfair Clydogau, Cardiganshire and Dolau Cothi, Carmarthenshire, was a Welsh Whig politician who sat in the House of Commons from 1713 to 1715.

Johnes was the only surviving son of Thomas Johnes of Llanfair, Cardiganshire, and his wife Anne Lloyd, daughter of David Lloyd of Crymlyn, Monmouthshire. He succeeded to his father's estates in about 1698. He married Jane Herbert, daughter of William Herbert of Hafod Uchdryd, Llanfihangel-y-Creuddyn, Cardiganshire and then as his second wife, Blanche Van, daughter of David Van of Llanwern, Monmouthshire.

Johnes was High Sheriff of Cardiganshire for the year 1704 to 1705. He stood as a Whig for Parliament at Cardiganshire at the 1708 British general election but was defeated and was unsuccessful in two succeeding petitions. At the 1713 general election he was returned as Member of Parliament for Cardiganshire, but lost the seat in 1715.

Johnes died in 1734 without issue by either wife and nominated as his heir Thomas Johnes of Pen-y-bont, Radnorshire, a first cousin once removed.

Parliament of Great Britain
Preceded by Sir Humphrey Mackworth	Member of Parliament for Cardiganshire; 1713– 1715	Succeeded by Lewis Pryse
Honorary titles
Preceded by Morgan Howells	High Sheriff of Cardiganshire; 1704–1705	Succeeded by John Lloyd of Llangennech
