= John Lewis (of Abernant) =

Welsh politician (born 1580)

Sir John Lewis (born 1580) was a Welsh politician who sat in the House of Commons from 1604 to 1611.

Lewis was the son of James ap Lewis of Abernant-bychan. He was admitted at Jesus College, Oxford on 22 April 1598, aged 17, and entered the Inner Temple in November 1598. He was knighted on 29 June 1604.

In 1604, Lewis was elected member of parliament for Cardiganshire. He was High Sheriff of Cardiganshire in 1609 and again in 1633. He became possessed of Coedmawr (Coedmor).

Lewis died in 1643 or in about 1656.

Lewis married Bridget Pryse, the eldest daughter of Sir Richard Pryse of Gogerddan.

Parliament of England
Preceded by Sir Richard Pryse	Member of Parliament for Cardiganshire; 1604–1611	Succeeded by Sir Richard Pryse
