= Dai John =

Wales international rugby league footballer

W. David John
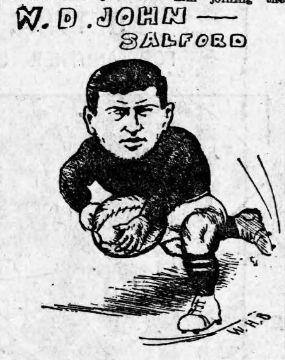

Personal information
- Full name: David John
- Born: Wales
- Died: unknown

Playing information
- Height: 1.60 m (5 ft 3 in)
- Weight: 70 kg (150 lb; 11 st 0 lb)

Rugby union
- Position: Half-back
Club
Years	Team	Pld	T	G	FG	P
≤1906–≤06	Penygraig RFC

Rugby league
- Position: Fullback, Stand-off
Club
Years	Team	Pld	T	G	FG	P
≤1906–≥13	Salford
Representative
Years	Team	Pld	T	G	FG	P
1913	Wales	1

W. David "Dai" John (birth unknown – death unknown) was a Welsh rugby union and professional rugby league footballer who played in the 1900s and 1910s. He played club level rugby union (RU) for Penygraig RFC, as a half-back, and representative level rugby league (RL) for Wales, and at club level for Salford, as a fullback or stand-off.

== Playing career ==
=== International honours ===
Dai John won a cap for Wales (RL) while at Salford in 1913.

=== Championship final appearances ===
During Dai John's time there was Salford's 5–3 victory over Huddersfield in the Championship Final during the 1913–14 season.

=== Challenge Cup Final appearances ===
Dai John played stand-off in Salford's 0–5 defeat by Bradford F.C. in the 1906 Challenge Cup Final during the 1905–06 season at Headingley, Leeds on Saturday 28 April 1906.

=== Club career ===
Dai John originally played rugby union, turning out at half-back for Penygraig RFC in the Rhondda. While still a teenager he switched codes to rugby league. John was considered a "Probable" for the 1910 Great Britain Lions tour of Australia and New Zealand, but ultimately he was not selected for the tour. Writing at the time in the Evening Express, their rugby league correspondent suggested that it was John's height, standing at 5 foot 3 inches, that cost him his place.
