= Peter Johns (engineer) =

Victorian industrialist (1830–1899)

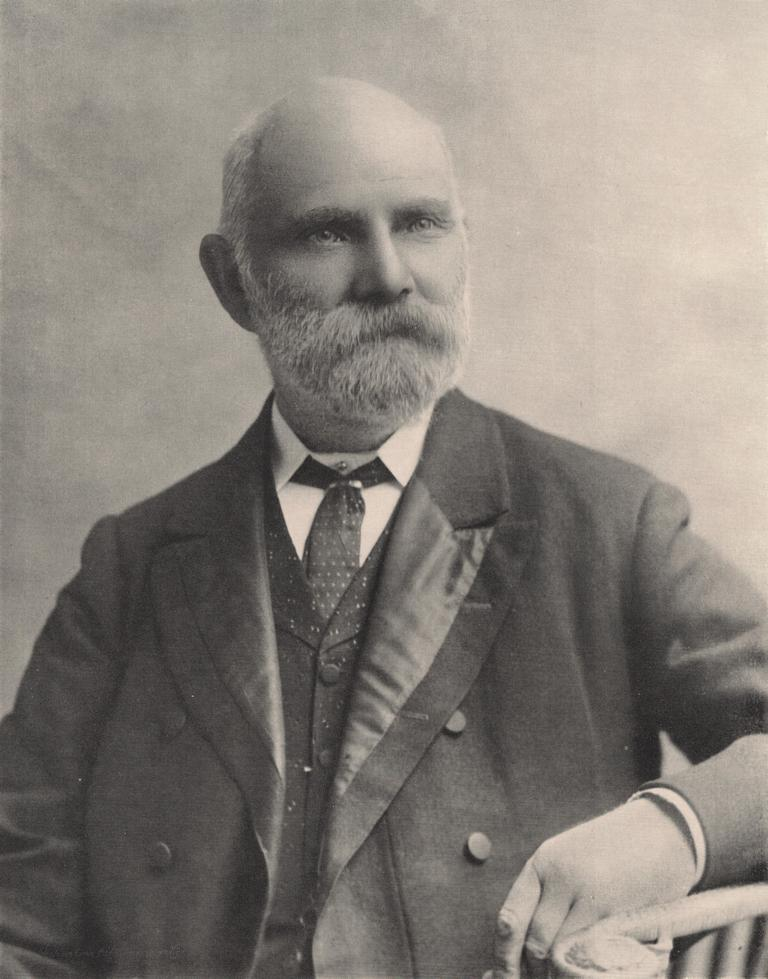
Peter Johns (undated)

Peter Johns (19 April 1830 – 24 September 1899) was an Australian mechanical engineer who founded the company Johns & Waygood.

== History ==
Johns was born in Pembroke, Wales, the son of builder Thomas Johns and his wife Elizabeth, née Tudor. He was for two years assistant foreman for Fox, Henderson & Co., working at the construction of The Crystal Palace.

He emigrated as a steerage passenger to Australia on the clipper Champion of the Seas, arriving after a 87-day journey in Melbourne in June 1856. He set up a blacksmith's workshop in Flinders Lane, where he fabricated straightforward iron components such as posts for houses and bridges, as well as undertaking a range of construction jobs.

Around 1870 he hired an engineer, Thomas Pearce, who had trade experience with Boulton and Watt of Birmingham, England. With Pearce as an assistant, they greatly expanded their capabilities and specialised in fabricating hydraulic lifts, which were increasingly being installed in multi-storey buildings. The workshop grew and in 1888 he floated Johns Hydraulic & General Engineering Co. as a public company. In 1892 they formed a consortium as Johns & Waygood to supply and install passenger and goods lifts to the new Metropolitan Gas Company building. In 1893 the company became Johns & Waygood Limited after taking over the Australian arm of the British Richard Waygood & Co. Johns, Pearce and Charles Lawson were board members and major shareholders, as were Thomas Bent and George Swinburne who served as chairmen of the company from 1888 to 1909 and 1909 to 1913, respectively.

In addition to the factory at Flinders Lane, the company established headquarters at City Road in South Melbourne, a galvanising plant in Sandringham, manufacturing plants in Adelaide, Hobart and Sydney.

Johns died at home after a long illness, and was buried at Boroondara Cemetery, Kew. His son, the cricketer Alfred Johns, was on tour in England when news arrived that his father was dangerously ill and immediately left for home on the SS Oroya, arriving in Adelaide on 25 September – his father had died the previous night. Peter Johns was by all accounts a generous and highly regarded employer.

Members of the family have been actively involved throughout its history. Peter's sons Alfred E. Johns, Frederic W. Johns, and F. Peter Johns served as directors and chairmen of the company.

In 1966 Johns & Waygood merged with the South Australian heavy engineering firm of Perry Engineering, forming Johns Perry Ltd. In the following decade they closed down their facilities at Mile End, Gawler and Whyalla. The merged company was then acquired by Boral in 1986. After further takeovers the company became known as Advanced Building Technologies Group and was still operating under that name in 2006.

== Family ==
Johns married Charlotte Eliza Barrett (ca.1831 – 29 August 1918) in 1856, three months after arriving in Melbourne, and lived in Lygon Street before purchasing a home in Hawthorn. They had six daughters and two sons, one being the cricketer Alfred Edward Johns. They lived at "Tudor", Berkley Street, Hawthorn, and were members of the Wesleyan Methodist Church.
