= Leah John =

Canadian professional golfer (born 2000)

Personal information
- Nationality: Canada
- Born: May 23, 2000 (age 26) Vancouver, British Columbia, Canada
- Height: 5 ft 8 in (173 cm)

Career
- Sport: Golf
- College: University of Nevada, Reno
- Turned professional: 2024
- Current tour: LPGA Tour
- Former tour: Epson Tour
- Professional wins: 1

Number of wins by tour
- Epson Tour: 1

Best results in LPGA major championships
- Chevron Championship: DNP
- Women's PGA C'ship: DNP
- U.S. Women's Open: CUT: 2025
- Women's British Open: DNP
- Evian Championship: DNP

Leah John (born May 23, 2000) is a Canadian professional golfer. A college golfer at the University of Nevada, Reno, John was named to Team Canada in 2023. In 2025 John qualified for her first U.S. Women's Open tournament.

== Early life ==
John began playing golf at age 5 while growing up with her parents in Vancouver, Canada.

== Amateur career ==
It wasn't until she was 17 before she decided she wanted to play golf at the college level. In 2018, John graduated from York House School.

After taking a gap year to improve her game in Arizona, in 2019 she signed with the University of Nevada to play golf. At Nevada, she won four tournaments: the 2022 Show at Spanish Trail, the 2023 Pat Lesser Harbottle Invitational, 2023 Golf Iconic Classic and the 2024 Causeway Invitational. She finished the 2024 season by matching the second best single round score in the history of the Nevada Wolf Pack women's golf team.

In 2023, she was named to Team Canada. In Canada, John was a two-time British Columbia Amateur champion.

== Professional career ==
After graduation, John turned professional, joining the Epson Tour. In 2024, she finished number 61 in the Epson's Race for the Card. In April 2025, John qualified for that year's U.S. Women's Open after finishing in a first place tie at a qualifier at Del Paso Country Club, but did not make the cut after the second round.

John won her first professional tournament in August 2025 at the Four Winds Invitational.

John earned her 2026 LPGA Tour card by finishing T-10 at the LPGA Q-Series Final Qualifying in December 2025.

== Amateur wins ==
- 2021 British Columbia Amateur
- 2022 The Show, British Columbia Amateur
- 2023 Pat Lesser-Harbottle Invitational, Golf Iconic Classic
- 2024 The Causeway Invitational

== Professional wins (1) ==
=== Epson Tour wins (1) ===
- 2025 Four Winds Invitational

== Results in LPGA majors ==
Tournament	2025
Chevron Championship	
U.S. Women's Open	CUT
Women's PGA Championship	
The Evian Championship	
Women's British Open	

Did not play

CUT = missed the half-way cut
