= Robert J. Johns =

Canadian labour organizer

Robert J. Johns was a labour organizer in Manitoba, Canada. He was activist in the Socialist Party of Canada. He was a founder and prominent figure in Canada's One Big Union movement.

Johns was a member of the Socialist Party of Canada, and was a prominent spokesman for the SPC in Winnipeg during the 1910s. In 1918, he said he thought it was futile for labour representatives to seek election to capitalist legislatures, and called for direct action such as general strikes.

The following year, he attended the Western Labour Conference in Calgary, Alberta, and brought forward a series of resolutions that provided for the creation of the One Big Union in Canada.

Shortly after this, he participated in the Winnipeg General Strike. He served a year in prison for his activities in the strike.

After the strike ended, the various labour parties in the city formed a temporary alliance in the interests of labour unity.

Johns, despite his previous comments about electoral politics, was candidate for the SPC in the Winnipeg constituency in the 1920 provincial election. At the time, Winnipeg elected ten members via Single transferable voting. Johns was 39th out of 41 on the first count with only 52 votes. Through vote transfers from successful Labour candidates, he improved his vote tally but was eventually eliminated on the ninth count.

He studied and became a teacher, finding employment as machinist teacher in St. Johns High School. Later being appointed Director of Technical Education for the Province of Manitoba.
