= Pryse baronets =

Extinct baronetcy in the Baronetage of the United Kingdom

There have been two baronetcies created for members of the Pryse family, one in the Baronetage of England and one in the Baronetage of the United Kingdom. Both creations are extinct.

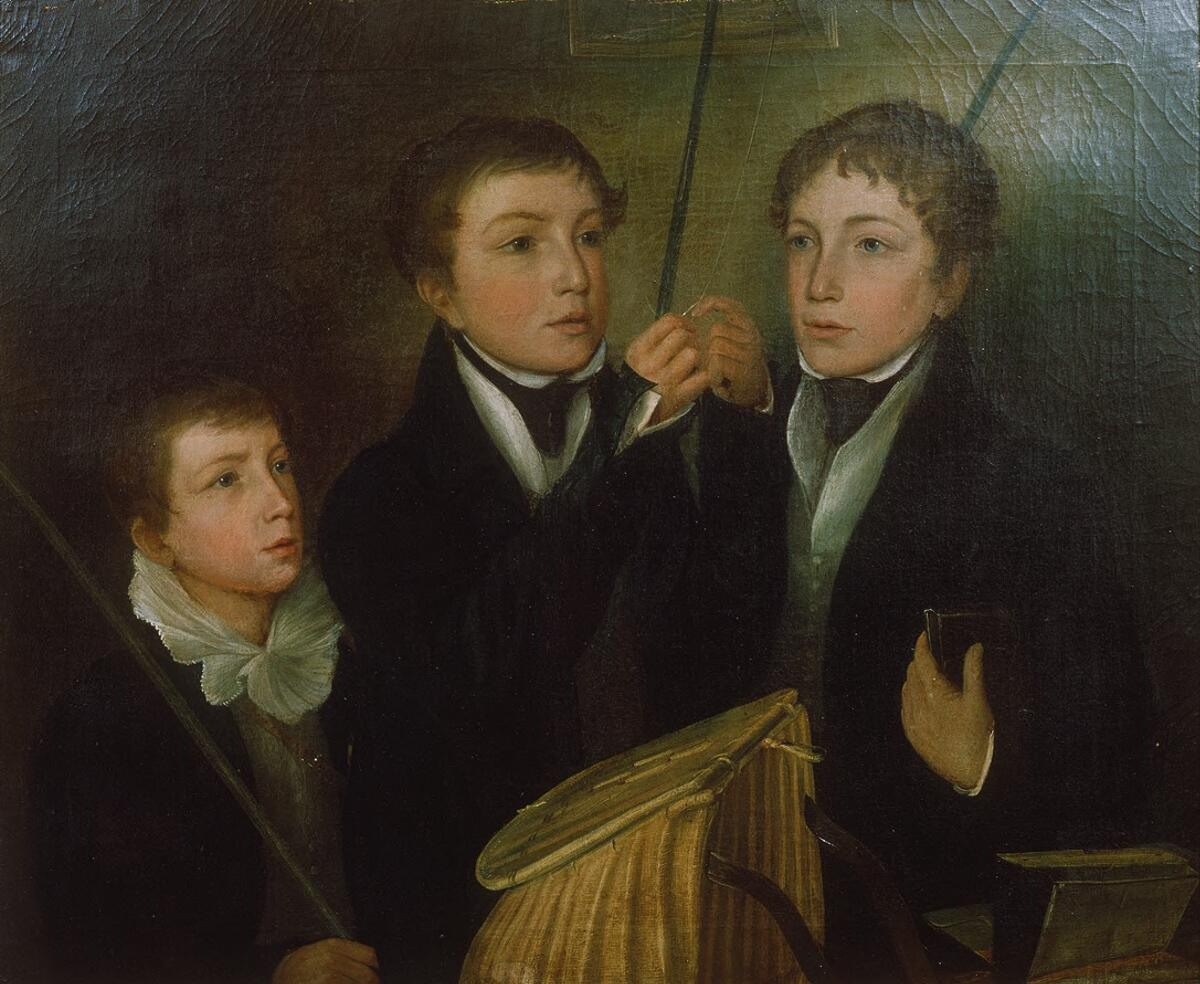
Images of Meibion Pryse Pryse

The Pryse Baronetcy, of Gogerddan (or Gogarthen) in the County of Cardigan, was created in the Baronetage of England on 9 August 1641 for Richard Pryse, subsequently Member of Parliament for Cardiganshire. He was succeeded by his eldest son, Sir Richard, the second Baronet, who also represented Cardiganshire in Parliament. Both he and his younger brother and successor, Sir Thomas, the third Baronet, died childless.

Sir Thomas was succeeded by his nephew, Sir Carbery, the fourth Baronet, the son of Carbery Pryse, third and youngest son of the first Baronet. Sir Carbery also sat as Member of Parliament for Cardiganshire. The title became extinct when he died without issue in 1694.

The Pryse estates eventually devolved on his kinsman Edward Pryse and then on Lewis Pryse, Member of Parliament for both Cardiganshire and Cardigan. Lewis Pryse had no sons and the estates devolved on his cousin Thomas Pryse, Member of Parliament for Cardigan in the 1740s. Thomas Pryse's son John Pryse represented both Cardiganshire and Merionethshire in Parliament. John Pryse died unmarried in 1774 and his cousin Lewis Pryse (1716–1779), son of Walter Pryse, of Painswick, Gloucestershire, succeeded to the Pryse estates.

Lewis Pryse's only son Lewis Pryse died unmarried in 1776 and the latter's sister Margaret Pryse became heir of her father. She was the wife of Edward Loveden, of Buscot Park, Berkshire. Margaret predeceased her father and her son Pryse Loveden succeeded to the family estates on her grandfather's death in 1798, assuming the surname of Pryse in lieu of his patronymic. Pryse Pryse was Member of Parliament for Cardigan from 1832 to 1849. His son and namesake Pryse Pryse also represented Cardigan in Parliament. The baronetcy of Gogarthen was revived in 1866 in favour of the latter's son Pryse Pryse (see the 1866 creation below).

The Pryse, later Webley-Parry-Pryse, later Pryse-Saunders, later Saunders-Pryse Baronetcy, of Gogardden in the County of Cardigan, was created in the Baronetage of the United Kingdom on 28 July 1866 for Pryse Pryse (see the 1641 creation above for the earlier history of the family). The second Baronet assumed the surname Webley-Parry-Pryse. The third Baronet used the surname Pryse only. The fourth Baronet assumed the surname Pryse-Saunders. The fifth Baronet assumed in 1949 the surname Saunders-Pryse. The title became extinct on his death in 1962.

== Pryse baronets, of Gogarthen (or Gogardden) (1641) ==
- Sir Richard Pryse, 1st Baronet (died 1651)
- Sir Richard Pryse, 2nd Baronet (c. 1630–c. 1675)
- Sir Thomas Pryse, 3rd Baronet (died 1682)
- Sir Carbery Pryse, 4th Baronet (died 1694)

== Pryse, later Webley-Parry-Pryse, later Pryse-Saunders, later Saunders-Pryse baronets, of Gogardden (1866) ==
Escutcheon of the Pryse baronets of Gogardden

- Sir Pryse Pryse, 1st Baronet (1838–1906)
- Sir Edward John Webley-Parry-Pryse, 2nd Baronet (1862–1918)
- Sir Lewes Thomas Loveden Pryse, 3rd Baronet (1864–1946)
- Sir George Rice Pryse-Saunders, 4th Baronet (1870–1948)
- Sir Pryse Loveden Saunders-Pryse, 5th Baronet (1896–1962)
