= John Wogan (MP died 1557) =

English politician

Sir John Wogan (c. 1480 – 24 August 1557) was a Welsh politician.

He was the son of John Wogan of Wiston, Pembrokeshire and his wife Ann, daughter of Sir Thomas Vaughan, succeeded his father in 1483 and was knighted c. 1547.

He was a Gentleman Usher by 1513 (when he fought in France) to 1530. He was appointed High Sheriff of Cardiganshire for 1541–42 and 1555–56 and High Sheriff of Pembrokeshire for 1542–43 and 1553–54. He was elected MP for Pembrokeshire in 1545 and October 1553.

He married Jane, the daughter and heiress of William Philip ap Gwilym of Stone Hall, with whom he had four sons and twelve daughters. He was succeeded by his grandson John Wogan.
