= Alfred Johns =

Australian cricketer

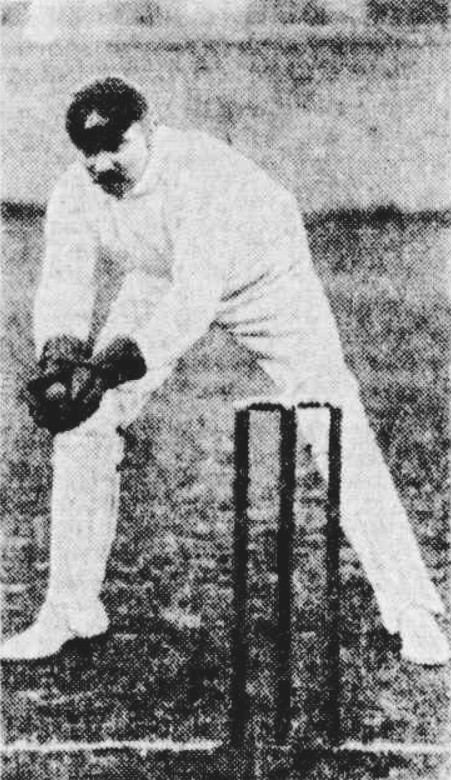

Personal information
- Full name: Alfred Edward Johns
- Born: 22 January 1868; Hawthorn, Melbourne, Australia
- Died: 13 February 1934 (aged 66); Melbourne, Australia
- Batting: Left-handed
- Role: Wicket-keeper
- Relatives: Peter Johns (father)

Domestic team information
- Years: Team
- 1894–95 to 1898–99: Victoria

Career statistics
Competition	First-class
Matches	37
Runs scored	429
Batting average	11.28
100s/50s	0/1
Top score	57
Catches/stumpings	58/26
- Source: Cricinfo

Alfred Edward Johns (22 January 1868 – 13 February 1934) was an Australian cricketer who played first-class cricket for Australia and Victoria between 1895 and 1899.

== Personal life ==
Born in the Melbourne suburb of Hawthorn, Johns was one of eight children of Elizabeth (née Tudor) and Peter Johns, founder of the lift manufacturing firm Johns & Waygood. After attending Wesley College in Melbourne, he studied law and practised as a lawyer in Melbourne. He gave up the law in 1899 when his father died, and succeeded his father as director of Johns & Waygood. Johns died in 1934 in Melbourne, aged 66.

== Cricket career ==
Johns made his first-class debut for Victoria in a match against the touring English team in March 1895. A wicket-keeper and left-handed batsman, he toured with the Australian national team to England twice, in 1896 and 1899, without playing in a Test Match. Unusually for an Australian player, over half of Johns' first-class matches were played in England rather than Australia.

Johns returned early from the 1899 tour of England when his father died, and retired from cricket immediately. Tom Horan wrote at the time that Johns was the best wicket-keeper Australia had ever had, apart from Jack Blackham.

== See also ==
- List of Victoria first-class cricketers
