= John David (academic) =

American physician

John David is an American physician who is currently the Richard Pearson Strong Professor of Tropical Public Health, Emeritus at Harvard School of Public Health. David earned his medical degree at the University of Chicago.
