= Crynfryn =

Village in Ceredigion, Wales

Coordinates: 52°13′54″N 4°04′39″W

- Location within Ceredigion
- OS grid reference: SN 5821 6131
  - Cardiff: 64.6 mi (104.0 km)
  - London: 175.7 mi (282.8 km)
- Community: Nantcwnlle
- Principal area: Ceredigion
- Country: Wales
- Sovereign state: United Kingdom
- Post town: Aberystwyth
- Postcode district: SY23
- Police: Dyfed-Powys
- Fire: Mid and West Wales
- Ambulance: Welsh
- UK Parliament: Ceredigion Preseli
- Senedd Cymru – Welsh Parliament: Ceredigion

Crynfryn is a hamlet in the community of Nantcwnlle, Ceredigion, Wales, which is 64.6 miles (104 km) from Cardiff and 175.7 miles (282.8 km) from London. Crynfryn is represented in the Senedd by Elin Jones (Plaid Cymru) and is part of the Ceredigion Preseli constituency in the House of Commons.

== See also ==
- List of localities in Wales by population
