= Peter St John (disambiguation) =

Peter St. John was an 18th-century American poet.

Peter St John may also refer to:

- Peter St John (architect), British architect
- Peter St John, 9th Earl of Orkney (born 1938), Canadian academic and Scottish peer
- Pete St John (1932–2022), Irish folk singer-songwriter
- Peter St. John, a fictional superhero within the Zenith comic strip
