= John Wogan (MP died 1580) =

Welsh politician

John Wogan (1538–1580) was a Welsh politician.

He was the son of Richard Wogan of Wiston, Pembrokeshire and succeeded his grandfather Sir John Wogan (c. 1480 – 1557).

He was appointed a justice of the peace for Pembrokeshire in 1564, High Sheriff of Pembrokeshire for 1566–67 and 1571–72 and High Sheriff of Cardiganshire for 1563–64.

He was elected MP for Pembrokeshire in 1571 and 1576, dying in office in 1580.

He married Cecilia, the daughter of Sir Edward Carne of Ewenny Priory, Glamorgan, with whom he had one son, William.
