= Peter John =

Peter John may refer to:

- Peter John (canoeist), German sprint canoer
- Peter John (educationist), British university manager
- Peter John (sculpture), a sculpture by artist John Raimondi
- Peter John, Baron John of Southwark, British politician

== See also ==
- Peter St John (disambiguation)
