= Henry Johns =

Henry Johns may refer to:

- Henry H. Johns, American politician
- Henry T. Johns (1828–1906), Union Army soldier and Medal of Honor recipient
- Henry Van Dyke Johns (1803–1859), Episcopal clergyman
