= Paul Johns =

Paul Johns may refer to:

- Paul Johns (American football)
- Paul Johns (activist)
- Paul Johns (artist)
