= Chris John (entrepreneur) =

Chris John (born 6 February 1959) is a British businessman, sports executive and competitive indoor rower. He is the co-founder, chairman, and CEO of Sports Travel and Hospitality Group (STH), a provider of commercial hospitality and ticketing programmes for sports events. He previously was CEO of Global Events at Sodexo from 2010 to 2015.

John won a bronze medal in the 65-70 age group at the 2024 World Indoor Rowing Championships in Prague, and a silver medal at the 2024 British National Indoor Rowing Championships in Birmingham.

== Career ==
John began his career in marketing, holding executive roles at Telewest and the Dunlop Slazenger Group. He later became marketing director at the British Horseracing Board in 2002.

In 2010, while CEO of Global Events at Sodexo, he co-founded Sports Travel and Hospitality Group (STH), a joint venture with Andrew Burton of the Mike Burton Group. STH was appointed to manage the first official commercial hospitality programme for the London 2012 Olympic Games. Since then, the company has operated travel and hospitality services for the Rugby World Cups in 2011, 2015, and 2019, among other global tournaments.

In April 2023, Sodexo Live! acquired full ownership of STH, retaining John as Chairman and CEO. Under his leadership, STH continues to manage commercial ticketing and hospitality programmes for international sporting events, including the Rugby World Cups (2025, 2027, 2029), the Australian Open, Cricket World Cups, and the World Baseball Classic.

== Personal life ==
John is married to Helen Glanville, a journalist, media trainer, author and former BBC television producer. They have two children.
