= David Johns (cricketer) =

English cricketer

Personal information
- Full name: David Frank Victor Johns
- Born: 27 June 1921; Paddington, London, England
- Died: 20 November 1979 (aged 58); High Wycombe, Buckinghamshire, England
- Batting: Right-handed
- Bowling: Slow left-arm orthodox

Domestic team information
- Years: Team
- 1953: Minor Counties
- 1950–1966: Buckinghamshire

Career statistics
Competition	First-class	List A
Matches	1	1
Runs scored	4	19
Batting average	2.00	19.00
100s/50s	–/–	–/–
Top score	4	19
Balls bowled	102	–
Wickets	1	–
Bowling average	55.00	–
5 wickets in innings	–	–
10 wickets in match	–	–
Best bowling	1/55	–
Catches/stumpings	1/–	–/–
- Source: Cricinfo, 7 May 2011

David Frank Victor Johns (27 June 1921 – 20 November 1979) was an English cricketer. Johns was a left-handed batsman who bowled slow left-arm orthodox. He was born in Paddington, London.

Johns made his debut for Buckinghamshire in the 1950 Minor Counties Championship against Hertfordshire. Johns played Minor counties cricket for Buckinghamshire from 1950 to 1966, which included 83 Minor Counties Championship matches. In 1952, when Buckinghamshire won the championship, Johns scored 846 runs at an average of 70.50 and took 39 wickets at 14.02. That season he set a record for the highest score for the county when he made 191 against Bedfordshire.

He made his only List A appearance for Buckinghamshire against Middlesex in the 1965 Gillette Cup. He made 19 runs before being dismissed by Ron Hooker.

Johns played a single first-class match for a combined Minor Counties team in 1953 against the touring Australians. He took his only first-class wicket in the Australians' first innings, that of Don Tallon, for the cost of 55 runs from 13 overs. With the bat he was dismissed for a duck in the Minor Counties first innings by Ray Lindwall, and in the second innings he scored 4 runs before being dismissed by Ron Archer.

He died in High Wycombe, Buckinghamshire on 20 November 1979.
