= David Johns =

American painter

David Johns (born 1948) is a Navajo painter from the Seba Dalkai, Arizona, United States.

== Background ==
He was born in Winslow, Arizona, United States. As a child, Johns spent many hours with his grandmother herding sheep through their land. During these years, she taught him how to respect and care for the land, plants and animals who enable the Navajo to live, and told him many of the stories that explain how the Navajo came to be and where his parents clans originated. Johns received formal training in fine arts from Northern Arizona University, earning a bachelor's degree in 1982. In 1996, he was awarded an Honorary Doctorate Degree in Humane Letters from Northern Arizona University.

== Artwork ==
Johns started selling portraits and landscapes while still in high school. His work combines his formal training with the traditional teachings he learned as a child and the Navajo philosophy of life by which he lives. The symmetry of his paintings reflect this harmony and balance; the colors and textures he creates reflect the beauty of the land from which he comes. His abstract paintings capture life's subtle phenomena such as the sunlight at different times of the day or the emotions brought by each of the four seasons.

In 1987, Johns was approached by long-time mentor Lovena Ohl and Albert Wareing to paint a mural on the dome of Concord Place. The mural covered thirty-six feet in diameter and rose 50 feet in the air, and took 18 months to paint. The mural depicts native peoples in all four directions, presenting indigenous designs and symbols, and portraits of great leaders such as Crazy Horse and Quanah Parker. Noted author N. Scott Momaday wrote of his work at Concord Place, "David Johns is a seer, and he comes very honestly by that gift. In his remarkable artwork, he enables us to see as well. His gift becomes our gift. Here is the essential spirit of creation."

Beginning in 1976, David's work has been exhibited at gallery shows all over the world, with many solo exhibitions including Navajo Tribal Museum, Window Rock, Arizona (1977); C.G. Rein Galleries, Santa Fe, New Mexico (1984); The Concord Place, Phoenix, Arizona (1987); Millicent Rogers Museum, Taos, New Mexico (1993); Palais de Nations, United Nations, Geneva, Switzerland (1999); and the Lanning Gallery, Sedona, Arizona (2006).

David is the Vice President of the Diné Hataałii Association, an organization of Navajo Medicine Men and Women.

== Bibliography ==
- Jacka, Lois Essary, Jerry Jacka, N. Scott Momaday. David Johns: On The Trail Of Beauty. Scottsdale, AZ: Snailspace Publishing Inc., 1991. Library of Congress 91–60780.
- Touchette, Charleen, Suzanne Deats, Nancy Stem. NDN Art: Contemporary Native American Art. Albuquerque, NM: Fresco Fine Art Publications Inc., 2003. ISBN 0-9741023-2-6
- Iverson, Peter, Monty Roessel. Diné: A History Of The Navajos. Albuquerque, NM: University of New Mexico Press, 2002. ISBN 0-8263-2714-1.
