= Thomas Johnes (priest) =

Welsh cleric

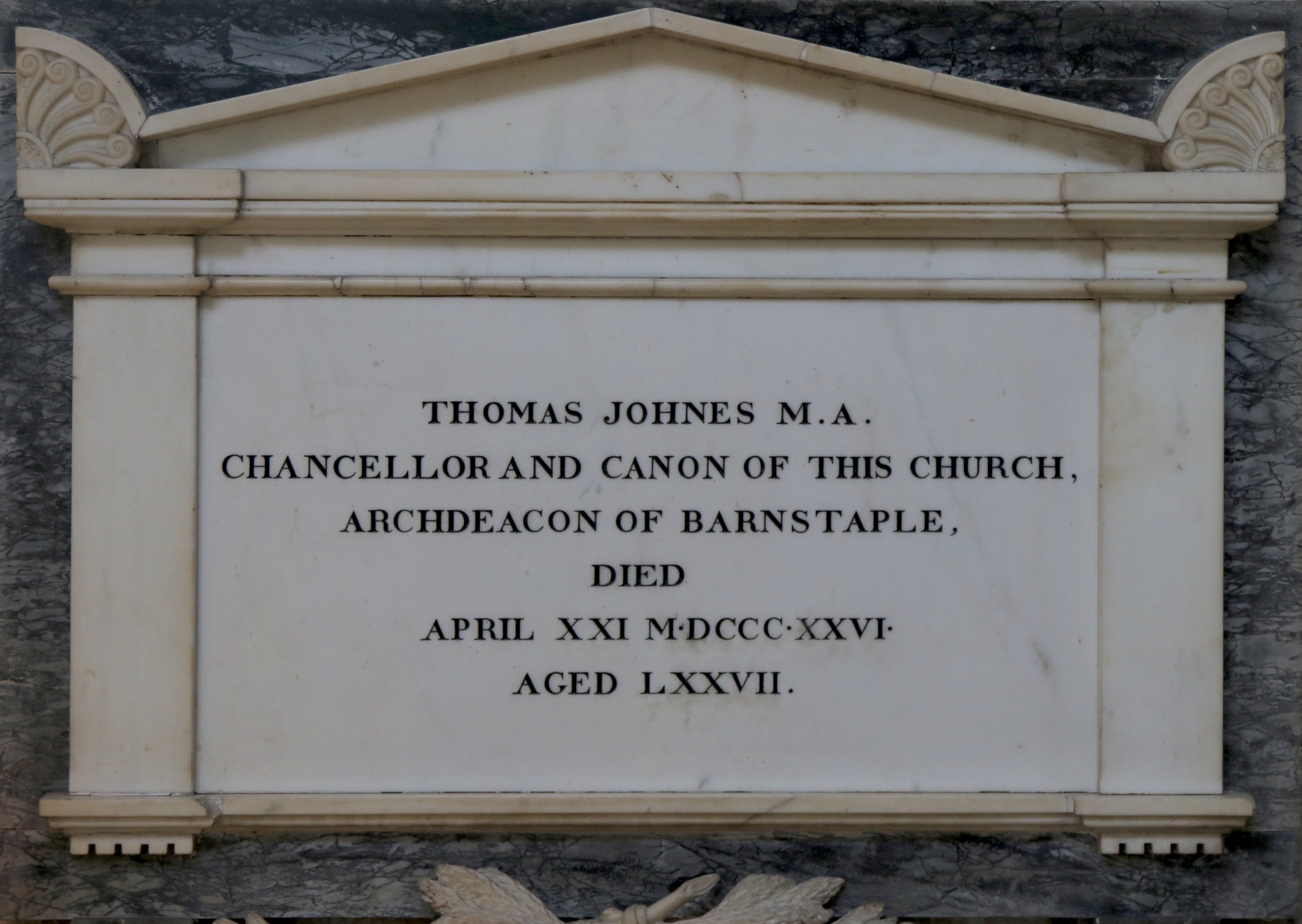
Memorial in Exeter Cathedral

Thomas Johnes, MA (1749 – 21 April 1826) was a Welsh cleric of the Church of England, Archdeacon of Barnstaple from 1807 to 1826.

He was born in Llanrhidian, the son of John Johnes, educated at Jesus College, Oxford, where he matriculated in 1769. He was ordained deacon in 1770, and became a curate at Bristol St John the Baptist. In 1772 he was ordained priest, and in 1773 he became rector of Littleton on Severn. In 1779 he returned to Bristol St John the Baptist as rector, a position he held to the end of his life.

Johnes graduated B.A. and M.A. at Oxford in 1783. After a period as domestic chaplain to the Bishop of Bristol, he was curate of Filton and vicar of Ashleworth from 1804; in 1807 he was appointed Archdeacon of Barnstaple. He was also rector of Bradstone in 1812, and of Lezant in 1815. He died in Exeter.
