= Sir Richard Pryse, 1st Baronet =

Welsh politician

Sir Richard Pryse, 1st Baronet (died 1651) was a Welsh politician who sat in the House of Commons from 1646 to 1648.

Pryse was the son of Sir John Pryse of Gogerddan and Abersychan and his wife Mary Bromley, daughter of Sir Henry Bromley of Shradon Castle, Shropshire. He was created baronet of Gogerddan on 9 August 1641.

In 1639 he was appointed High Sheriff of Cardiganshire and in 1646 elected Member of Parliament for Cardiganshire in the Short Parliament. He was excluded in 1648 under Pride's Purge. He is buried in Westminster Abbey.

Pryse married firstly Hester Myddelton daughter of Sir Hugh Myddelton, 1st Baronet, by whom he had three sons, and secondly Mary van Dyck, daughter of Patrick Ruthven and widow of Anthony van Dyck. He was succeeded successively by the two elder sons of his first marriage, Richard and Thomas.

Parliament of England
Preceded by Walter Lloyd	Member of Parliament for Cardiganshire; 1646–1648	Succeeded by Not represented in Rump Parliament
Baronetage of England
New creation	Baronet (of Gogarthen (or Gogardden)); 1641–1651	Succeeded by Richard Pryse
