= 2024 Women's PGA Championship =

Golf tournament

2024 KPMG Women's PGA Championship

Tournament information
- Dates: June 20–23, 2024
- Location: Sammamish, Washington; 47.635°N 122.057°W
- Courses: Sahalee Country Club (South & North nines)
- Organized by: PGA of America
- Tour: LPGA Tour

Statistics
- Par: 72
- Length: 6,731 yards (6,155 m)
- Field: 156 players, 73 after cut
- Cut: 149 (+5)
- Prize fund: $10,400,000
- Winner's share: $1,560,000

Champion
- (South Korea) Amy Yang
- 281 (−7)
- Location in the United States Location in Washington

The 2024 KPMG Women's PGA Championship was the 70th Women's PGA Championship. It was played June 20–23 at Sahalee Country Club in Sammamish, Washington, a suburb east of Seattle. It was the third of five major championships on the LPGA Tour during the 2024 season.

Sahalee hosted the PGA Championship in 1998, the U.S. Senior Open in 2010, and the Women's PGA Championship in 2016, where Brooke Henderson won in a playoff over Lydia Ko.

Amy Yang won her first major by three strokes over Ko Jin-young, Lilia Vu, and Miyū Yamashita.

== Course layout ==
Hole	1	2	3	4	5	6	7	8	9	Out	10	11	12	13	14	15	16	17	18	In	Total
Yards	384	507	388	390	170	496	419	433	173	3,360	397	543	433	155	370	396	379	181	517	3,371	6,731
Par	4	5	4	4	3	5	4	4	3	36	4	5	4	3	4	4	4	3	5	36	72

- South and North nines

The course was 6,624 yards (6,057 m), par 71 in 2016; the 18th hole was a par 4 at 421 yards (385 m).

== Field ==
The field included 156 players who met one or more of the selection criteria and commit to participate by a designated deadline.

1. Active LPGA and/or World Golf Hall of Fame members (Note: To be considered active, an LPGA and/or World Golf Hall of Fame member must have participated in 10 official LPGA tournaments within the 12 months prior to the commitment deadline.)

2. Past winners of the Women's PGA Championship

- Hannah Green (3,4,8,13)
- Brooke Henderson (3,4,8,13)
- Danielle Kang (4,13)
- Cristie Kerr
- Kim Sei-young (3,8)
- Nelly Korda (3,4,8,13)
- Anna Nordqvist (3,7,13)
- Yani Tseng
- Yin Ruoning (3,4,7,8,13)
- Chun In-gee (3,4,13), Laura Davies, Shanshan Feng, Inbee Park, Park Sung-hyun did not play.

3. Professionals who have won an LPGA major championship in the previous five years and during the current year

- Céline Boutier (4,8,13)
- Ashleigh Buhai (4,8,13)
- Allisen Corpuz (4,8,13)
- Kim A-lim (8,13)
- Ko Jin-young (4,8,13)
- Jennifer Kupcho (4,8,13)
- Lee Jeong-eun (13)
- Minjee Lee (4,8,13)
- Sophia Popov (13)
- Yuka Saso (4,7,8,13)
- Hinako Shibuno (13)
- Patty Tavatanakit (4,8,13)
- Lilia Vu (4,8,13)
- Mirim Lee did not play.

4. Professionals who have won an official LPGA tournament in the previous two calendar years and during the current year

- Marina Alex (13)
- Pajaree Anannarukarn (13)
- Gemma Dryburgh (13)
- Jodi Ewart Shadoff (13)
- Ally Ewing (8,13)
- Ayaka Furue (7,8,13)
- Linn Grant (8,13)
- Nasa Hataoka (8,13)
- Charley Hull (8,13)
- Mone Inami (13)
- Ji Eun-hee (13)
- Megan Khang (7,8,13)
- Grace Kim (13)
- Kim Hyo-joo (8,13)
- Lydia Ko (8,13)
- Andrea Lee (8,13)
- Gaby López (13)
- Nanna Koerstz Madsen (13)
- Leona Maguire (8,13)
- Alexa Pano (13)
- Paula Reto (13)
- Ryu Hae-ran (8,13)
- Maja Stark (8,13)
- Linnea Ström (13)
- Bailey Tardy (13)
- Atthaya Thitikul (8,13)
- Chanettee Wannasaen (8,13)
- Amy Yang (8,13)
- Angel Yin (8,13)
- Rose Zhang (7,8,13)

5. Winners of the 2023 Dow Great Lakes Bay Invitational

- Cheyenne Knight (13)
- Elizabeth Szokol (13)

6. Order of Merit winners from the Ladies European Tour, LPGA of Japan Tour, and LPGA of Korea Tour

- Trichat Cheenglab (LET)
- Miyū Yamashita (8) (JLPGA)
- Lee Ye-won (KLPGA,8) did not play.

7. Professionals who finished top-10 and ties at the previous year's Women's PGA Championship

- Carlota Ciganda (8,13)
- Lin Xiyu (8,13)
- Stephanie Meadow (13)
- Jenny Shin (8,13)

8. Professionals ranked No. 1–60 on the Women's World Golf Rankings as of May 20, 2024

- Aditi Ashok (13)
- Choi Hye-jin (13)
- Lauren Coughlin (13)
- Alexandra Försterling (13)
- Georgia Hall (13)
- Im Jin-hee (13)
- Akie Iwai
- Chisato Iwai
- Ariya Jutanugarn (13)
- Alison Lee (13)
- Gabriela Ruffels (13)
- Madelene Sagström (13)
- Mao Saigo (13)
- Jiyai Shin
- Rio Takeda
- Lexi Thompson (13)
- Bang Shin-sil, Hwang You-min, Sakura Koiwai, Park Hyun-kyung, Park Ji-young, Park Min-ji, Ai Suzuki did not play.

9. The top eight finishers at the 2023 LPGA Professionals National Championship

- Jennifer Borocz
- Sandra Changkija
- Stephanie Connelly Eiswerth
- Allie Knight
- Samantha Morrell
- Wendy Ward
- Allie White
- Joanna Coe did not play.

10. The top finisher (not otherwise qualified via the 2023 LPGA Professionals National Championship) at the 2024 PGA Women's Stroke Play Championship

- Kim Paez

11. Sponsor invitations (Note: Maximum of two)

- Bronte Law
- Mariah Stackhouse

12. Any player who did not compete in the 2023 KPMG Women's PGA Championship due to maternity (Note: As approved by the Women’s PGA Championship in conjunction with the player’s home tour, provided she was otherwise qualified to compete in the 2023 Women’s PGA Championship.)

13. LPGA members who have committed to the event, ranked in the order of their position on the 2024 CME Globe Points list

- An Na-rin
- Dottie Ardina
- Celine Borge
- Ssu-Chia Cheng
- Pei-Yun Chien
- Robyn Choi
- Cydney Clanton
- Olivia Cowan
- Perrine Delacour
- Lindy Duncan
- María Fassi
- Isabella Fierro
- Kristen Gillman
- Savannah Grewal
- Nataliya Guseva
- Mina Harigae
- Lauren Hartlage
- Esther Henseleit
- Hsu Wei-ling
- Caroline Inglis
- Jang Hyo-joon
- Jeon Ji-won
- Moriya Jutanugarn
- Haeji Kang
- Kang Min-ji
- Minami Katsu
- Sarah Kemp
- Auston Kim
- Frida Kinhult
- Aline Krauter
- Stephanie Kyriacou
- Lee Mi-hyang
- Lee So-mi
- Stacy Lewis
- Lucy Li
- Brittany Lincicome
- Pernilla Lindberg
- Roberta Liti
- Mary Liu
- Ruixin Liu
- Liu Yan
- Polly Mack
- Caroline Masson
- Wichanee Meechai
- Morgane Métraux
- Azahara Muñoz
- Malia Nam
- Hira Naveed
- Yuna Nishimura
- Yealimi Noh
- Ryann O'Toole
- Bianca Pagdanganan
- Kaitlyn Papp Budde
- Park Hee-young
- Emily Kristine Pedersen
- Pornanong Phatlum
- Ren Yue
- Lizette Salas
- Sarah Schmelzel
- Alena Sharp
- Jennifer Song
- Angela Stanford
- Sung Yu-jin
- Thidapa Suwannapura
- Albane Valenzuela
- Lindsey Weaver-Wright
- Yin Xiaowen
- Arpichaya Yubol
- Yu Liu
- Zhang Weiwei

== Round summaries ==
=== First round ===
Thursday, June 20, 2024

Lexi Thompson shot a 4-under-par round of 68 to take a one stroke lead over world number one Nelly Korda and Patty Tavatanakit. Defending champion Yin Ruoning was three strokes back at 71.

Place	Player	Score	To par
1	(United States) Lexi Thompson	68	−4
T2	(United States) Nelly Korda	69	−3
T2	(Thailand) Patty Tavatanakit	69	−3
T4	(France) Céline Boutier	70	−2
T4	(United States) Allisen Corpuz	70	−2
T4	(England) Charley Hull	70	−2
T4	(United States) Caroline Inglis	70	−2
T4	(Japan) Akie Iwai	70	−2
T4	(Republic of Ireland) Leona Maguire	70	−2
T4	(Sweden) Madelene Sagström	70	−2
T4	(Japan) Mao Saigo	70	−2
T4	(Japan) Hinako Shibuno	70	−2
T4	(South Korea) Amy Yang	70	−2
T4	(Thailand) Arpichaya Yubol	70	−2

=== Second round ===
Friday, June 21, 2024

Place	Player	Score	To par
T1	(United States) Sarah Schmelzel	71-67=138	−6
T1	(South Korea) Amy Yang	70-68=138	−6
T3	(South Korea) Ko Jin-young	72-68=140	−4
T3	(Japan) Hinako Shibuno	70-70=140	−4
T3	(United States) Lexi Thompson	68-72=140	−4
T6	(Republic of Ireland) Leona Maguire	70-71=141	−3
T6	(South Korea) Ryu Hae-ran	74-67=141	−3
T6	(Japan) Miyū Yamashita	71-70=141	−3
T9	(United States) Ally Ewing	72-70=142	−2
T9	(United States) Lauren Hartlage	73-69=142	−2
T9	(Sweden) Madelene Sagström	70-72=142	−2

=== Third round ===
Saturday, June 22, 2024

Place	Player	Score	To par
1	(South Korea) Amy Yang	70-68-71=209	−7
T2	(United States) Lauren Hartlage	73-69-69=211	−5
T2	(Japan) Miyū Yamashita	71-70-70=211	−5
4	(United States) Sarah Schmelzel	71-67-74=212	−4
T5	(United States) Caroline Inglis	70-74-69=213	−3
T5	(South Korea) Ko Jin-young	72-68-73=213	−3
T5	(Japan) Hinako Shibuno	70-70-73=213	−3
T5	(United States) Lexi Thompson	68-72-73=213	−3
T5	(United States) Lilia Vu	75-70-68=213	−3
T10	(United States) Ally Ewing	72-70-72=214	−2
T10	(Mexico) Gaby López	73-72-69=214	−2

=== Final round ===
Sunday, June 23, 2024

Champion
(c) = past champion

Place	Player	Score	To par	Money ($)
1	(South Korea) Amy Yang	70-68-71-72=281	−7	1,560,000
T2	(South Korea) Ko Jin-young	72-68-73-71=284	−4	702,478
T2	(United States) Lilia Vu	75-70-68-71=284	−4	702,478
T2	(Japan) Miyū Yamashita	71-70-70-73=284	−4	702,478
T5	(United States) Ally Ewing	72-70-72-71=285	−3	378,447
T5	(United States) Lauren Hartlage	73-69-69-74=285	−3	378,447
T7	(Japan) Mao Saigo	70-76-73-67=286	−2	267,437
T7	(Japan) Hinako Shibuno	70-70-73-73=286	−2	267,437
T9	(Sweden) Linn Grant	73-74-70-70=287	−1	192,046
T9	(United States) Caroline Inglis	70-74-69-74=287	−1	192,046
T9	(South Korea) Ryu Hae-ran	74-67-75-71=287	−1	192,046
T9	(United States) Sarah Schmelzel	71-67-74-75=287	−1	192,046
T9	(United States) Lexi Thompson	68-72-73-74=287	−1	192,046

Leaderboard below the top 10
Place	Player	Score	To par	Money ($)
T14	(Germany) Esther Henseleit	74-73-69-72=288	E	150,871
T14	(Mexico) Gaby López	73-72-69-74=288	E	150,871
T16	(South Korea) Choi Hye-jin	75-70-72-72=289	+1	131,531
T16	(England) Charley Hull	70-73-72-74=289	+1	131,531
T16	(South Korea) Kim Hyo-joo	71-76-72-70=289	+1	131,531
T19	(France) Céline Boutier	70-73-75-72=290	+2	116,057
T19	(United States) Allisen Corpuz	70-75-73-72=290	+2	116,057
T19	(Japan) Ayaka Furue	71-74-75-70=290	+2	116,057
T22	(Canada) Brooke Henderson (c)	73-72-73-73=291	+3	105,966
T22	(Sweden) Madelene Sagström	70-72-73-76=291	+3	105,966
T24	(United States) Lauren Coughlin	74-71-72-75=292	+4	91,079
T24	(Australia) Hannah Green (c)	71-77-73-71=292	+4	91,079
T24	(Australia) Minjee Lee	74-72-72-74=292	+4	91,079
T24	(Republic of Ireland) Leona Maguire	70-71-75-76=292	+4	91,079
T24	(Thailand) Patty Tavatanakit	69-75-73-75=292	+4	91,079
T24	(China) Yin Ruoning (c)	71-77-71-73=292	+4	91,079
T30	(South Korea) Kim A-lim	76-73-73-71=293	+5	77,707
T30	(China) Lin Xiyu	74-72-70-77=293	+5	77,707
T32	(Japan) Akie Iwai	70-76-71-77=294	+6	70,136
T32	(Thailand) Ariya Jutanugarn	72-73-73-76=294	+6	70,136
T32	(Japan) Rio Takeda	77-70-73-74=294	+6	70,136
T35	(India) Aditi Ashok	72-77-72-74=295	+7	58,365
T35	(Chinese Taipei) Pei-Yun Chien	72-75-73-75=295	+7	58,365
T35	(United States) Jennifer Kupcho	73-71-73-78=295	+7	58,365
T35	(South Korea) Sung Yu-jin	73-73-73-76=295	+7	58,365
T35	(United States) Lindsey Weaver-Wright	74-69-74-78=295	+7	58,365
T35	(United States) Rose Zhang	76-72-75-72=295	+7	58,365
T41	(United States) Lindy Duncan	76-73-73-74=296	+8	46,524
T41	(South Korea) Jeon Ji-won	76-71-72-77=296	+8	46,524
T41	(Japan) Minami Katsu	72-73-74-77=296	+8	46,524
T41	(South Korea) Lee Mi-hyang	73-75-74-74=296	+8	46,524
T41	(Philippines) Bianca Pagdanganan	72-72-74-78=296	+8	46,524
T46	(South Korea) An Na-rin	76-72-73-76=297	+9	37,675
T46	(Norway) Celine Borge	71-73-79-74=297	+9	37,675
T46	(United States) Cheyenne Knight	73-76-74-74=297	+9	37,675
T46	(New Zealand) Lydia Ko	75-73-76-73=297	+9	37,675
T46	(Australia) Gabriela Ruffels	74-74-76-73=297	+9	37,675
T46	(Thailand) Arpichaya Yubol	70-77-74-76=297	+9	37,675
T52	(Thailand) Pajaree Anannarukarn	73-73-77-75=298	+10	29,771
T52	(South Africa) Ashleigh Buhai	73-75-75-75=298	+10	29,771
T52	(England) Georgia Hall	74-72-73-79=298	+10	29,771
T52	(Australia) Stephanie Kyriacou	74-69-78-77=298	+10	29,771
T52	(United States) Malia Nam	74-71-76-77=298	+10	29,771
T52	(United States) Yealimi Noh	73-76-74-75=298	+10	29,771
T52	(United States) Elizabeth Szokol	74-72-77-75=298	+10	29,771
T52	(Thailand) Atthaya Thitikul	74-74-78-72=298	+10	29,771
T60	(Mexico) María Fassi	76-73-75-75=299	+11	23,969
T60	(Thailand) Moriya Jutanugarn	74-75-77-73=299	+11	23,969
T60	(Australia) Grace Kim	73-75-77-74=299	+11	23,969
T60	(South Africa) Paula Reto	77-71-74-77=299	+11	23,969
T60	(United States) Mariah Stackhouse	75-74-72-78=299	+11	23,969
T60	(Sweden) Maja Stark	72-71-77-79=299	+11	23,969
T66	(Germany) Aline Krauter	72-71-77-80=300	+12	21,951
T66	(United States) Lizette Salas	74-73-77-76=300	+12	21,951
68	(Japan) Yuka Saso	74-75-77-75=301	+13	21,189
69	(Sweden) Frida Kinhult	75-73-74-80=302	+14	20,688
T70	(Switzerland) Morgane Métraux	72-75-79-77=303	+15	20,061
T70	(Spain) Azahara Muñoz	73-74-81-75=303	+15	20,061
72	(United States) Angel Yin	74-75-82-74=305	+17	19,675
73	(China) Ruixin Liu	72-74-82-78=306	+18	19,424
CUT	(Germany) Alexandra Försterling	73-77=150	+6	
CUT	(Russia) Nataliya Guseva	77-73=150	+6	
CUT	(South Korea) Im Jin-hee	76-74=150	+6	
CUT	(South Korea) Kang Min-ji	75-75=150	+6	
CUT	(Denmark) Nanna Koerstz Madsen	76-74=150	+6	
CUT	(United States) Nelly Korda (c)	69-81=150	+6	
CUT	(China) Mary Liu	77-73=150	+6	
CUT	(Sweden) Anna Nordqvist (c)	73-77=150	+6	
CUT	(United States) Alexa Pano	72-78=150	+6	
CUT	(United States) Kaitlyn Papp Budde	78-72=150	+6	
CUT	(Denmark) Emily Kristine Pedersen	77-73=150	+6	
CUT	(Thailand) Pornanong Phatlum	76-74=150	+6	
CUT	(Australia) Robyn Choi	75-76=151	+7	
CUT	(United States) Cydney Clanton	75-76=151	+7	
CUT	(France) Perrine Delacour	76-75=151	+7	
CUT	(United States) Mina Harigae	73-78=151	+7	
CUT	(Japan) Nasa Hataoka	77-74=151	+7	
CUT	(South Korea) Jang Hyo-joon	76-75=151	+7	
CUT	(South Korea) Haeji Kang	76-75=151	+7	
CUT	(Australia) Sarah Kemp	75-76=151	+7	
CUT	(South Korea) Kim Sei-young (c)	76-75=151	+7	
CUT	(United States) Andrea Lee	77-74=151	+7	
CUT	(China) Yu Liu	78-73=151	+7	
CUT	(Germany) Polly Mack	75-76=151	+7	
CUT	(Germany) Caroline Masson	79-72=151	+7	
CUT	(Thailand) Wichanee Meechai	78-73=151	+7	
CUT	(Japan) Yuna Nishimura	75-76=151	+7	
CUT	(South Korea) Park Hee-young	78-73=151	+7	
CUT	(United States) Jennifer Song	75-76=151	+7	
CUT	(Switzerland) Albane Valenzuela	78-73=151	+7	
CUT	(Thailand) Trichat Cheenglab	77-75=152	+8	
CUT	(Germany) Olivia Cowan	73-79=152	+8	
CUT	(Mexico) Isabella Fierro	75-77=152	+8	
CUT	(Canada) Savannah Grewal	78-74=152	+8	
CUT	(Chinese Taipei) Hsu Wei-ling	76-76=152	+8	
CUT	(United States) Danielle Kang (c)	78-74=152	+8	
CUT	(South Korea) Lee Jeong-eun	72-80=152	+8	
CUT	(Germany) Sophia Popov	79-73=152	+8	
CUT	(Philippines) Dottie Ardina	75-78=153	+9	
CUT	(Spain) Carlota Ciganda	78-75=153	+9	
CUT	(Scotland) Gemma Dryburgh	76-77=153	+9	
CUT	(Japan) Chisato Iwai	77-76=153	+9	
CUT	(South Korea) Ji Eun-hee	79-74=153	+9	
CUT	(United States) Kim Paez	77-76=153	+9	
CUT	(South Korea) Jiyai Shin	75-78=153	+9	
CUT	(China) Yin Xiaowen	77-76=153	+9	
CUT	(China) Zhang Weiwei	79-74=153	+9	
CUT	(United States) Marina Alex	78-76=154	+10	
CUT	(Chinese Taipei) Ssu-Chia Cheng	79-75=154	+10	
CUT	(United States) Cristie Kerr (c)	75-79=154	+10	
CUT	(United States) Auston Kim	77-77=154	+10	
CUT	(England) Bronte Law	75-79=154	+10	
CUT	(China) Ren Yue	79-75=154	+10	
CUT	(South Korea) Jenny Shin	76-78=154	+10	
CUT	(United States) Bailey Tardy	78-76=154	+10	
CUT	(Chinese Taipei) Yani Tseng (c)	79-75=154	+10	
CUT	(England) Jodi Ewart Shadoff	72-83=155	+11	
CUT	(United States) Stacy Lewis	81-74=155	+11	
CUT	(United States) Brittany Lincicome	76-79=155	+11	
CUT	(Italy) Roberta Liti	78-77=155	+11	
CUT	(Northern Ireland) Stephanie Meadow	77-78=155	+11	
CUT	(United States) Ryann O'Toole	75-80=155	+11	
CUT	(Thailand) Thidapa Suwannapura	80-75=155	+11	
CUT	(South Korea) Lee So-mi	76-80=156	+12	
CUT	(United States) Megan Khang	81-76=157	+13	
CUT	(Sweden) Pernilla Lindberg	81-76=157	+13	
CUT	(United States) Allie White	81-76=157	+13	
CUT	(United States) Kristen Gillman	80-78=158	+14	
CUT	(United States) Lucy Li	84-74=158	+14	
CUT	(Thailand) Chanettee Wannasaen	73-85=158	+14	
CUT	(United States) Stephanie Connelly Eiswerth	78-81=159	+15	
CUT	(United States) Alison Lee	81-78=159	+15	
CUT	(United States) Samantha Morrell	81-78=159	+15	
CUT	(Canada) Alena Sharp	79-80=159	+15	
CUT	(United States) Angela Stanford	75-84=159	+15	
CUT	(Sweden) Linnea Ström	81-78=159	+15	
CUT	(China) Liu Yan	87-73=160	+16	
CUT	(United States) Sandra Changkija	83-80=163	+19	
CUT	(United States) Jennifer Borocz	84-80=164	+20	
CUT	(Australia) Hira Naveed	82-83=165	+21	
CUT	(United States) Allie Knight	82-87=169	+25	
CUT	(United States) Wendy Ward	84-85=169	+25	
WD	(Japan) Mone Inami	81	+9	

==== Scorecard ====
Hole	1	2	3	4	5	6	7	8	9	10	11	12	13	14	15	16	17	18
Par	4	5	4	4	3	5	4	4	3	4	5	4	3	4	4	4	3	5
(South Korea) A.Yang	−8	−8	−7	−7	−8	−8	−8	−9	−9	−8	−9	−9	−10	−10	−10	−9	−7	−7
(South Korea) Ko	−3	−3	−3	−3	−4	−4	−3	−2	−2	−2	−3	−3	−3	−3	−2	−3	−3	−4
(United States) Vu	−3	−3	−3	−3	−3	−3	−3	−2	−2	−3	−4	−5	−5	−4	−3	−3	−3	−4
(Japan) Yamashita	−5	−6	−6	−6	−6	−6	−6	−4	−4	−4	−5	−4	−4	−4	−3	−3	−3	−4
(United States) Ewing	−2	−2	−3	−3	−3	−4	−4	−3	−4	−4	−4	−4	−4	−4	−4	−3	−3	−3
(United States) Hartlage	−5	−6	−6	−6	−7	−7	−5	−3	−3	−3	−3	−3	−3	−3	−2	−2	−3	−3

Cumulative tournament scores, relative to par

Birdie	Bogey	Double bogey
