= Caroline Inglis =

American professional golfer (born 1994)

Personal information
- Nationality: United States
- Born: March 2, 1994 (age 32) Eugene, Oregon, U.S.
- Height: 5 ft 6 in (1.68 m)

Career
- Sport: Golf
- College: University of Oregon
- Turned professional: 2016
- Former tours: LPGA Tour; Symetra Tour
- Professional wins: 1

Best results in LPGA major championships
- Chevron Championship: T34: 2022
- Women's PGA C'ship: T9: 2024
- U.S. Women's Open: T69: 2024
- Women's British Open: T22: 2020
- Evian Championship: CUT: 2023, 2024

Caroline Inglis (born March 2, 1994) is an American professional golfer and LPGA Tour player.

== Early life, college and amateur career ==
Inglis started playing golf at the age of 13 and won three straight individual state titles as an Oregon junior golfer. In 2011, she advanced to match play in the U.S. Girls' Junior, and reached the quarter-finals of the Oregon Amateur.

Inglis attended the University of Oregon from 2012 to 2016 and played with the Oregon Ducks women's golf team. In her penultimate year, she won the individual Pac-12 Conference Championship with a 7-under 206 (67-72-67), the second-lowest score in program history at the time.

== Professional career ==
Inglis turned professional in 2016 and finished tied 44th at the LPGA Final Qualifying Tournament to earn status for the 2017 LPGA Tour. She recorded her first top-10 finish at the 2018 Hugel-JTBC LA Open, before sitting out the 2019 LPGA Tour season due to a back injury, which required surgery.

Inglis returned from injury to finish tied 22nd at the 2020 Women's British Open at Royal Troon. She claimed a two-shot win over Andrea Lee in the 2021 Rose Ladies Series event at Scotscraig Golf Club, also securing a spot at the Women's Scottish Open.

Inglis was in contention at the 2024 Women's PGA Championship, where she ultimately finished tied for 9th.

Inglis announced her retirement from the LPGA Tour at the conclusion of The Annika tournament in November 2025. She will take a position with the Oregon Golf Association.

== Amateur wins ==
- 2015 Pac-12 Championship, Trans Amateur Championship

== Professional wins (1) ==
=== Other wins (1) ===
- 2021 Rose Ladies Series at Scotscraig

== Results in LPGA majors ==
Results not in chronological order.

| Tournament | 2016 | 2017 | 2018 | 2019 | 2020 | 2021 | 2022 | 2023 | 2024 | 2025 |
|---|---|---|---|---|---|---|---|---|---|---|
| Chevron Championship | | | T48 | | T64 | CUT | T30 | CUT | T70 | CUT |
| U.S. Women's Open | CUT | | | | | | | | T69 | |
| Women's PGA Championship | | | CUT | | CUT | CUT | T30 | | T9 | CUT |
| The Evian Championship | | | WD | | NT | | | CUT | CUT | |
| Women's British Open | | | T52 | | T22 | | | | T49 | |

Top 10
Did not play

CUT = missed the half-way cut
WD = withdrew
NT = no tournament
T = tied

=== Summary ===
| Tournament | Wins | 2nd | 3rd | Top-5 | Top-10 | Top-25 | Events | Cuts made |
|---|---|---|---|---|---|---|---|---|
| Chevron Championship | 0 | 0 | 0 | 0 | 0 | 0 | 7 | 4 |
| U.S. Women's Open | 0 | 0 | 0 | 0 | 0 | 0 | 2 | 1 |
| Women's PGA Championship | 0 | 0 | 0 | 0 | 1 | 1 | 6 | 2 |
| The Evian Championship | 0 | 0 | 0 | 0 | 0 | 0 | 3 | 0 |
| Women's British Open | 0 | 0 | 0 | 0 | 0 | 1 | 3 | 3 |
| Totals | 0 | 0 | 0 | 0 | 1 | 2 | 21 | 10 |

- Most consecutive cuts made – 3 (2024 Chevron Championship – 2024 Women's PGA)
- Longest streak of top-10s – 1 (once)
