= Laetitia Beck =

Israeli professional golfer (born 1992)

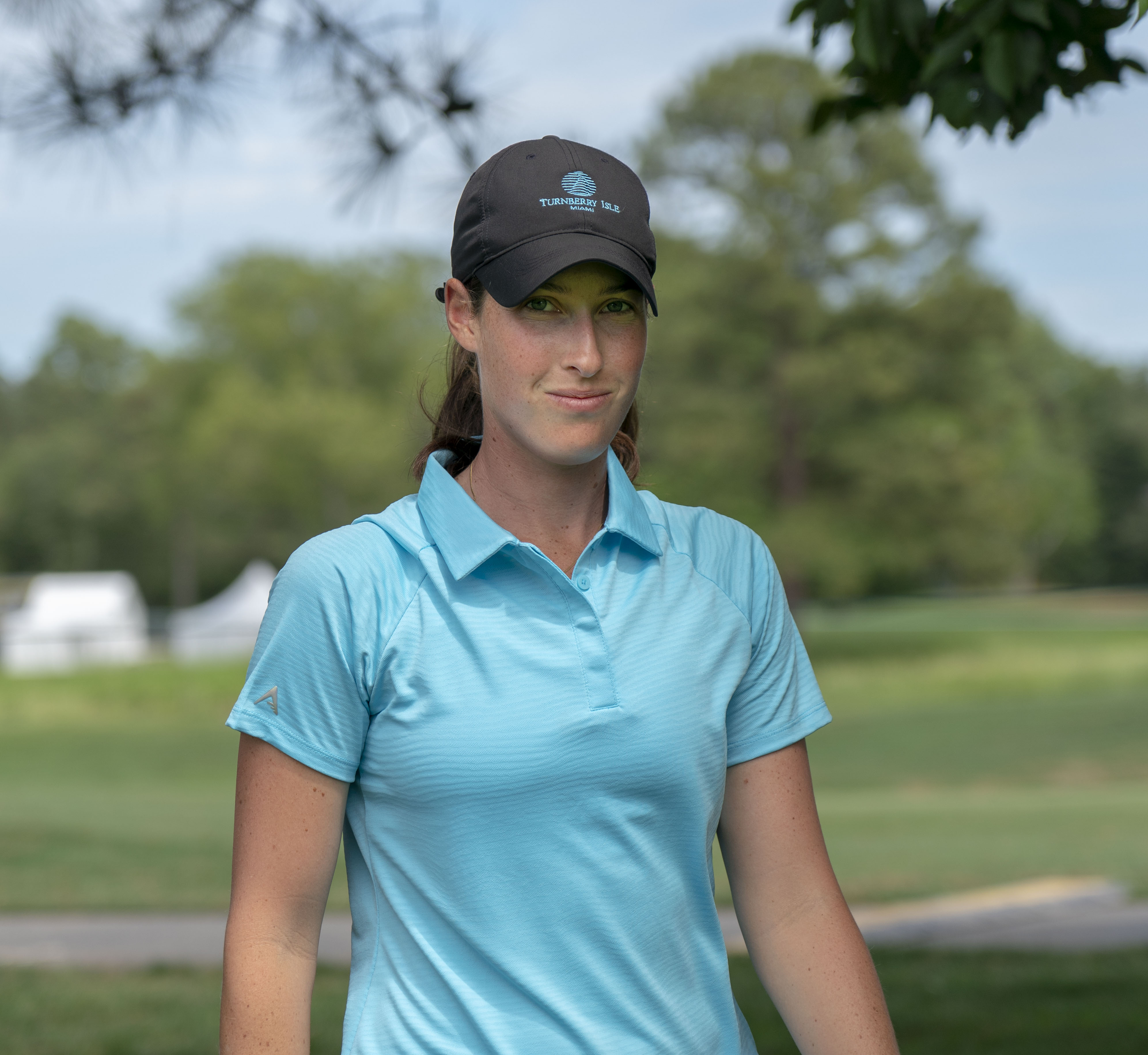
- Beck in 2018

Personal information
- Nickname: Laetis
- Nationality: Israel
- Born: 5 February 1992 (age 34) Antwerp, Belgium
- Height: 5 ft 9 in (1.75 m)

Career
- Sport: Golf
- College: Duke University
- Turned professional: 2014
- Current tour: LPGA Tour
- Former tour: Epson Tour
- Professional wins: 3

Number of wins by tour
- Epson Tour: 1
- Other: 2

Best results in LPGA major championships
- Chevron Championship: T66: 2018
- Women's PGA C'ship: T66: 2018
- U.S. Women's Open: DNP
- Women's British Open: CUT: 2014, 2016, 2018
- Evian Championship: DNP
Medal record
Maccabiah Games
Gold medal – first place	2009 Israel	Individual
Gold medal – first place	2013 Israel	Individual
Gold medal – first place	2013 Israel	Women's team

Laetitia Beck (Hebrew: לטיסיה בק; born 5 February 1992) is an Israeli professional golfer. She made her professional debut at the 2014 Women's British Open.

Beck has won the Israeli Open Golf Championship five times, including for the first time when she was 12 years of age. She also won gold medals in golf in both the 2009 and 2013 Maccabiah Games.

Beck attended Duke University from 2010 to 2014, where she played golf for the Blue Devils. In 2011, she was voted the Atlantic Coast Conference Rookie of the Year, in 2013 and 2014 she was an All-American, and for her college career she had a 73.58 stroke average (10th-best in school history).

She is the first Israeli to compete in an LPGA Tour event, and in December 2014 became the first Israeli to qualify as a fully-fledged PGA or LPGA Tour player. Beck competed for Israel at the 2016 Summer Olympics.

== Early life ==
In 1992, Beck was born in Antwerp, Belgium. She is Jewish, and keeps kosher, on and off the road. Her parents are Liliane and Jean Claude, who are keen recreational golfers, and she has one brother (Yoni) and two sisters (Liora and twin sister Olivia).

Beck and her family immigrated to Caesarea, Israel, an affluent town midway between the cities of Tel Aviv and Haifa on the Mediterranean coast, when she was six years old. It is the only city in Israel with an 18-hole golf course, Caesarea Golf Club, and she grew up walking distance from it. She began playing golf there at the Caesarea Golf Academy when she was nine years old. She excelled in both golf and tennis when she was young.

Looking for tougher competition in golf, Beck left for the United States as a teenager. For high school, starting at the age of 14 she attended the IMG Pendleton School in Bradenton, Florida. She graduated in 2010.

Beck won her first Israeli Ladies Championship at the age of 12, at the Israel Open Golf Tournament. In May 2005, at the age of 13, she won the Israel Open Golf Championship for the second year in a row. Seven months later, she made a hole-in-one on the first day of the Doral Open in Florida.

In 2008, she was again Israeli women's champion and won the 2008 Rolex Israel Open Championship. Beck also won the Junior Israel Open Championship, the University of Florida Championship, her section of the Doral Silver Classic Tournament, and finished third at the 2008 Girl's British Amateur Championship (and was awarded a first-place trophy in the category of Eastern Europe and Middle East Youth). That year, she was also chosen as one of Israel's sportswomen of the decade, by Israel's Culture and Sport Ministry.

In 2009, at the age of 17 Beck finished in second place at the Duke of York Young Champions Trophy in Scotland, one stroke behind the winner. That year, she also won the Israel Junior and Ladies Championships and the 2009 Doral Publix Junior Classic (with a 7-under-par 54-hole total of 209).

Beck won the 2010 Verizon Junior Heritage by two shots with rounds of 73 and 74 in Hilton Head Island, South Carolina. She was named Golfweek's Player of the Week on 8 February 2010. Later in February she took second place at the Annika Invitational. She was listed No. 5 in the Golfweek/Sagarin Performance Index in May 2010, and that month she took second in the Thunderbird International Junior in Scottsdale, Arizona. In June, she won the Caesarea Junior Golf Championship.

== Amateur career ==
Beck attended Duke University on a golf scholarship from 2010 to 2014, and majored in psychology. She played for the Duke Blue Devils beginning with the 2010–11 campaign. Duke's coach described her as "a very hard worker" who "has a beautiful, powerful golf swing."

In September 2010, she was ranked #4 in Ladies European Amateur rankings, appeared on the 2010 Golfweek Players-to-Watch list, and was ranked third-best freshman. In October, Beck was named 1 of 12 Rolex Junior First-team All-Americans by the American Junior Golf Association. She was also ranked #2 among US-based female youth golfers, and #6 among all US female golfers.

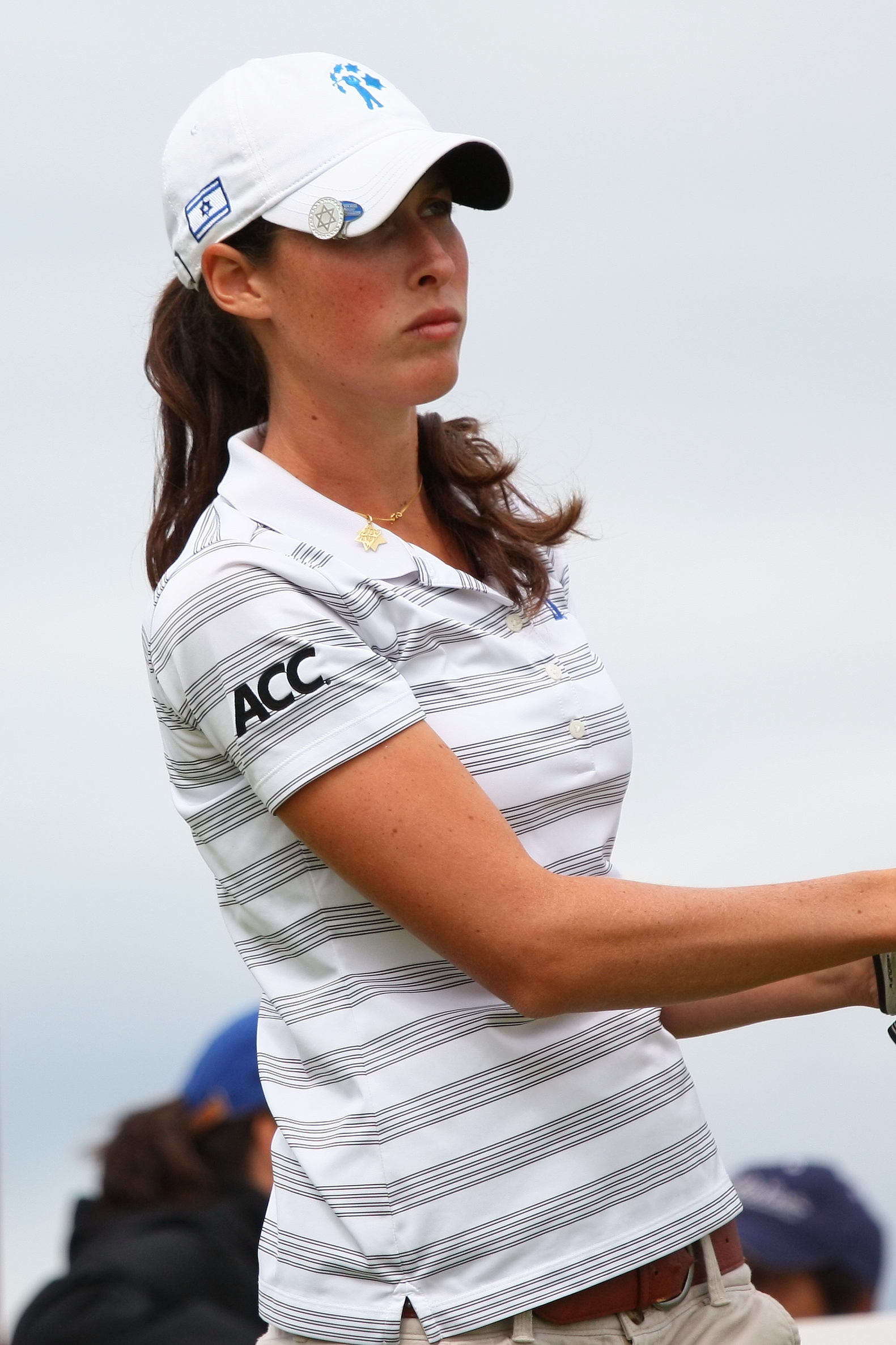
Beck at the 2013 Women's British Open

In March 2011, she took third at the Allstate Sugar Bowl Intercollegiate in New Orleans. Beck was named Atlantic Coast Conference (ACC) Golfer of the Month for April 2011, after a third-place finish at the Liz Murphey Collegiate. She registered a 73.75 stroke average during her freshman 2010–11 season, sixth in the ACC and tops among freshmen.

In May 2011, the ACC named Beck the ACC Rookie of the Year in a vote of the league's nine head coaches. She followed, among others, former Blue Devils Beth Bauer (1999), Liz Janangelo (2003), Brittany Lang (2004), and Amanda Blumenherst (2006). She was also named to the 12-person All-ACC squad, and to the 2010–11 ACC Academic Honor Roll, for academic excellence as a student-athlete.

In August 2011, she qualified to participate as an amateur in the CN Canadian Women's Open in Montreal, Canada. Beck finished tied for 70th in her first LPGA Tour event. In September, she became the first woman to defeat all men to win the Israel Open Golf Championship, as the Caesarea Golf Club allowed her to compete against men rather than women, so that she could play stiffer competition.

In October 2011, Beck declined a request to join the UNC Tar-Heels Invitational 54-hole competition, because it conflicted with the holiest Jewish holiday of Yom Kippur, the Day of Atonement. Instead, she spent the day fasting and praying. She said: "My Judaism is very important to me, and I keep all the other holidays. On Yom Kippur, no matter what, I have to fast." Her decision prompted comparisons to baseball pitcher Sandy Koufax not playing a game in the 1965 World Series.

In the 2011–12 season, as a sophomore she had a 74.97 stroke average, three top-10 finishes, and for the second time was an All-ACC selection.

In April 2013, Beck took second at the Atlantic Coast Conference Championship, in Greensboro, North Carolina. In August, Golf World cited her as one of the "top 50 players to watch".

In the 2012–13 season, as a junior she had a 73.16 stroke average, and earned Golfweek All-America and National Golf Coaches Association (NGCA) Honorable Mention All-America honors, and for the third time was an All-ACC selection.

In the 2013–14 season, as a senior Beck had a 72.29 stroke average, and earned WGCA First Team All-America and Golfweek Second Team All-America, for the fourth straight year was an All-ACC selection, and for the third time was named to the All-ACC Women's Golf Academic Team. She helped lead Duke to the NCAA Division I Women's Golf Championships and the ACC title. She placed 2nd in the NCAA Championship, tied for 3rd at the Tar Heel Invitational, and ranked 14th in the final Golfweek/Sagarin Performance Index. She graduated from Duke in 2014.

Beck totaled 45 rounds of even or under par over her Duke career (tied for 5th-best on Duke's career record charts), had a 73.58 career stroke average (10th-best in school history), and was the 11th Duke golfer to earn All-ACC accolades all four years.

== Professional career ==
In July 2014, at the age of 22 Beck became the first Israeli woman to play golf as a professional, making her professional debut at the 2014 Women's British Open. "It means a lot to me," she said. "It's the first time for me and my country."

In December 2014, at the age of 22 Beck became the first Israeli golfer to qualify as a fully-fledged PGA or LPGA Tour player. She finished T-18 at the LPGA Final Qualifying Tournament in Daytona Beach, Florida, to earn her tour card for the 2015 LPGA Tour.

In 2015, she played 14 events and made 8 cuts. At the Manulife LPGA Classic in 2015, Beck was one shot off the lead in the first round, just behind Cheyenne Woods. She ended with her best finish that year tied for 19th.

Beck is the first Israeli to compete in an LPGA Tour tournament, and displays the flag of Israel on her golf shoes (and sometimes on her hat or clubs), and a blue-and-white magen david symbol on her golf apparel. She noted: "When I play golf I'm very proud to represent Israel. My goal is to represent Israel and the Jewish people."

In January 2017, Beck came in 8th at the Pure Silk-Bahamas LPGA Classic, with a 19-under-par 273. In January 2018, she came in 10th at the same tournament, with a five-under-par in three rounds 214.

In March 2019, she tied for 6th in the IOA Championship, with a one-under-par in three rounds 215, and in April 2019, Beck came in tied for 6th in the Windsor Golf Classic, with a nine-under-par (207 aggregate). In May 2019, tied for 7th in the Valley Forge Invitational, with a 9 under par in three rounds 204. In August 2019, she came in tied for 7th in the PHC Classic, with a 9 under par in three rounds 207, and tied for 5th in the FireKeepers Casino Hotel Championship, with a 9 under par in three rounds 207.

In July 2020, Beck tied for 9th in the FireKeepers Casino Hotel Championship, with a 6 under par in three rounds 210.

In May 2021, Beck tied for 2nd, one shot off the lead at the Mission Inn Resort and Club Championship, her highest professional finish.

In September 2023, Beck shot a career-low final round of 63 besting her prior career low final round of 64 the week before.

In March 2025, Beck won her first Epson Tour event, the Atlantic Beach Classic hosted at Atlantic Beach Country Club. Beck fired a 54-hole score of 205 with rounds of 71, 68 and a final round 5 under 66. Event conditions included wind gusts exceeding 30mph. The event had only three players finish under par. She ultimately finished 8th in the Epson Tour rankings to graduate to the LPGA Tour for 2026.

=== Maccabiah Games ===
Beck won an individual gold medal and a team gold medal in golf at the 2009 Maccabiah Games. She then won both an individual gold medal and a team gold medal at the 2013 Maccabiah Games, shooting 69 in each of the three rounds, finishing 9-under, 15 strokes ahead of the nearest competitor and also helped Israel win gold by a stroke in the team event, over Team USA.

=== Olympics ===
Beck qualified to represent the Israeli Olympic team in golf at the Rio de Janeiro 2016 Summer Olympics, when the sport returned to the Olympic Games. She shot 75-70-71-70, for a 286 (+2) final score, coming in tied for 31st out of 60 competitors.

== Personal life ==
Beck resides in Caesarea, Israel. When she reached 18 years of age, she was enlisted in the Israel Defense Forces and completed her required military exams. But the army designated her to a sports prodigy status, and postponed her military service until after she finishes her education in the U.S.

== Awards and honors ==
- In 2008, Beck was chosen as one of Israel's sportswomen of the decade, by Israel's Culture and Sport Ministry.
- At the beginning of February 2010, she was named Golfweek's Player of the Week.
- In April 2011, Beck was named Atlantic Coast Conference (ACC) Golfer of the Month.
- In 2011, Beck earned Atlantic Coast Conference Rookie of the Year honors.

== Amateur wins ==
note: this list is incomplete

- 2004 Israeli Ladies Championship
- 2005 Israeli Ladies Championship
- 2008 University of Florida Championship, Israeli Ladies Championship, Junior Israel Open Championship
- 2009 Israel Junior Championship, Israel Ladies Championships, Doral Publix Junior Classic
- 2010 Verizon Junior Heritage

== Professional wins (3) ==
=== Epson Tour wins (1) ===
- 2025 Atlantic Beach Classic

== Team appearances ==
Amateur

- Espirito Santo Trophy (representing Israel): 2010

== See also ==
- List of Jewish golfers
