= Atlantic Beach Classic =

Golf tournament in Florida

Tournament information
- Location: Atlantic Beach, Florida
- Established: 2024
- Course: Atlantic Beach Country Club
- Par: 71
- Length: 6,300 yards (5,800 m)
- Tour: Epson Tour
- Format: Stroke play
- Prize fund: $250,000
- Month played: March

Tournament record score
- Aggregate: 200 Isabella Fierro (2026)
- To par: −13 as above

Current champion
- (Mexico) Isabella Fierro

Location map
- Location in United States Location in Florida

The Atlantic Beach Classic is a tournament on the Epson Tour, which is part of the LPGA's developmental tour. The tournament has been a part of the tour since 2024 and is held at Atlantic Beach Country Club in Atlantic Beach, Florida.

In 2026, the tournament serve as the tour's season opener.

== Winners ==
Year	Date	Winner	Score	Margin of victory	Runner(s)-up	Purse ($)	Winner's share ($)
2026	Mar 7	(Mexico) Isabella Fierro	−13 (68-65-67=200)	4 strokes	(United States) Kaitlyn Papp Budde (United States) Annabelle Pancake-Webb	250,000	37,500
2025	Mar 8	(Israel) Laetitia Beck	−8 (71-68-66=205)	3 strokes	(United States) Sophia Schubert	225,000	33,750
2024	Mar 23	(United States) Briana Chacon	−7 (67-70-69=206)	1 stroke	(United States) Kim Kaufman (United States) Jessica Porvasnik	300,000	45,000
