= Tuscaloosa Toyota Classic =

Golf tournament in Alabama

Tournament information
- Location: Tuscaloosa, Alabama
- Established: 2022
- Course: Ol' Colony Golf Course
- Par: 72
- Length: 6,515 yards (5,957 m)
- Tour: Epson Tour
- Format: Stroke play
- Prize fund: $237,500
- Month played: September
- Final year: 2024

Tournament record score
- Aggregate: 200 Ingrid Lindblad
- To par: −16 as above

Final champion
- (Sweden) Ingrid Lindblad

The Tuscaloosa Toyota Classic was a tournament on the Epson Tour, the LPGA's developmental tour. It was part of the tour's schedule from 2022 to 2024.

The tournament was held at the Ol' Colony Golf Course in Tuscaloosa, Alabama. Celine Borge of Norway won the inaugural event, marking her first Epson Tour title.

== Winners ==
Year	Date	Winner	Country	Score	Margin of victory	Runner-up	Purse ($)	Winner's share ($)
2024	Sep 15	Ingrid Lindblad	Sweden	200 (−16)	2 strokes	(Slovenia) Ana Belac	237,500	35,625
2023	Oct 1	Isabella Fierro	Mexico	203 (−13)	2 strokes	(United States) Laura Wearn	200,000	30,000
2022	Oct 2	Celine Borge	Norway	201 (−15)	1 stroke	(South Korea) Jang Hyo-joon	200,000	30,000
