= Isabella Fierro =

Mexican professional golfer (born 2000)

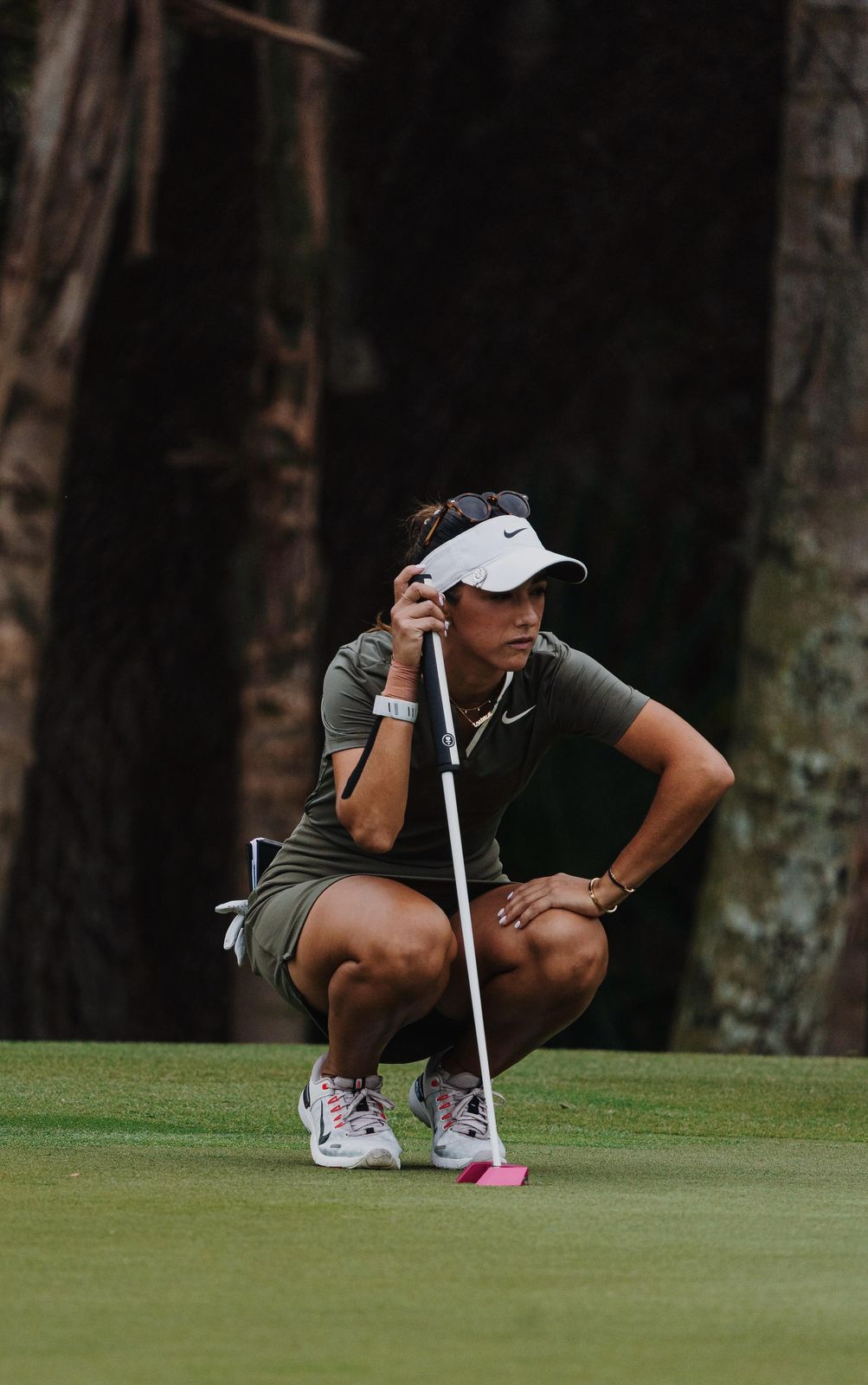

Personal information
- Nationality: Mexico
- Born: 16 December 2000 (age 25) Ciudad del Carmen, Mexico

Career
- Sport: Golf
- College: Oklahoma State University
- Turned professional: 2022
- Current tour: LPGA Tour
- Former tour: Epson Tour
- Professional wins: 2

Number of wins by tour
- Epson Tour: 2

Best results in LPGA major championships
- Chevron Championship: T23: 2024
- Women's PGA C'ship: 63rd: 2026
- U.S. Women's Open: CUT: 2024
- Women's British Open: DNP
- Evian Championship: CUT: 2024

Isabella Fierro (born 16 December 2000) is a Mexican professional golfer. Fierro turned professional in 2022 after playing collegiate golf at Oklahoma State University.

== Amateur career ==
Fierro is from Ciudad del Carmen, Mexico. Fierro distinguished herself on the golf course early as an amateur, winning the Mexican Amateur Championship in 2017, then the South American Amateur and then the North and South Women's Amateur Golf Championship.

Fierro elected to play golf at Oklahoma State University. At Oklahoma State, Fierro earned All America honorable mentions in 2021 and 2020, as well as third team All-America honors in 2020.

In 2022, Fierro sought a transfer to the University of Mississippi for her senior year of collegiate golf. When she found that her credits would not roll over to Ole Miss, Fierro turned professional.

== Professional career ==
Fierro joined the Epson Tour in 2022. In 2023, Fierro had her first professional win, at the Tuscaloosa Toyota Classic. That year, she placed ninth in the money list for the Epson Tour, and joined the LPGA Tour as a rookie in 2024. That year, she tied for 23rd place in the Chevron Championship, her highest placing. In 2025, she returned to the Epson Tour, after only making six cuts in her rookie year in the LPGA.

Fierro played in the 2023 Pan American Games, finishing tied-8th.

In 2026, Fierro returned to the LPGA Tour, after earning six top-10 finishes in the 2025 Epson Tour. In March 2026, Fierro won the Atlantic Beach Classic, the first event of the year for the Epson Tour.

== Professional wins (2) ==
=== Epson Tour wins (2) ===
- 2023 Tuscaloosa Toyota Classic
- 2026 Atlantic Beach Classic

== Team appearances ==
- Arnold Palmer Cup (representing International team): 2021 Arnold Palmer Cup
