= Scotscraig Golf Club =

Scotscraig Golfing Club
Club information
- Established: 1817
- Website: scotscraiggolfingclub.com
- Designed by: Davie Robertson; Old Tom Morris; James Braid (1923)
- Par: 71
- Length: 6,669 yards

Scotscraig Golfing Club is a golf club located in Tayport, Fife, Scotland, on the southern shore of the Firth of Tay. Founded in 1817 by members of The Society of St Andrews Golfers—the body that subsequently became The Royal and Ancient Golf Club of St Andrews—it is one of the oldest golf clubs in the world. The course measures 6,669 yards from the back tees to a par of 71 and occupies a hybrid of heathland and links terrain approximately 16 kilometres (10 miles) north of St Andrews.

The course has served as a Final Qualifying venue for The Open Championship on six occasions between 1984 and 2010, in conjunction with Opens held at the Old Course at St Andrews, and hosted the Scottish PGA Championship in 2023 and 2025.

== History ==
Golf at Scotscraig dates to 1817, when members of The Society of St Andrews Golfers established a course at Tayport on land belonging to William Dalgleish of Scotscraig. The earliest layout was associated with Davie Robertson and later modified by Old Tom Morris. A Gold Medal competition has been contested continuously since 1818; the first recorded winner was Captain Playfair, who later became Sir Hugh Lyon Playfair, Provost of St Andrews and captain of the R&A.

The Garpit links were ploughed up by a tenant farmer in 1834 and the club effectively went into abeyance until 1887, when a meeting was held in Tayport to revive it. Vice Admiral William Heriot-Maitland-Dougall, who had acquired the Scotscraig Estate and into whose possession the club's original medals had passed, restored them to the club and was appointed captain. A new nine-hole course opened in April 1888 on the site of the original layout.

The club merged with Newport Golf Club in 1890, and a new clubhouse was erected in 1896. The course was extended to 18 holes in 1904. In 1923 the club purchased the land outright and commissioned James Braid to redesign the layout; his routing has remained the basis of the course since. The first hole is named 'The Admiral' in recognition of Maitland-Dougall's role in the club's revival.

In 2017, the club's bicentenary year, a restoration project returned all greenside and fairway bunkers to their original Braid dimensions. Twenty-one greenside bunkers were reconstructed, 26 fairway and approach bunkers were rebuilt with natural rough edges, and new bunkers were introduced on the 11th, 12th and 16th holes.

In 2024, club members voted unanimously to enter talks with prospective funding partners following a period of financial uncertainty. In October 2025, The Ancient Links Golf Company was announced as the club's long-term partner, with a commitment to multi-year investment in course infrastructure and facilities.

== Course ==
The par-71 course measures 6,669 yards from the championship tees. The terrain is sand-based, with gorse, heather and coniferous plantation bordering many fairways. The routing follows a traditional two-loop structure, with the ninth hole returning to the clubhouse before the second nine departs.

The fourth hole, named 'Westward Ho', features a plateau green set on a raised knoll. Golf course historians have noted its similarity to the Knoll template hole type later used by architects including C. B. Macdonald and Donald Ross.

== Notable associations ==
Justin Rose qualified for the 1995 Open Championship at St Andrews through Final Qualifying at Scotscraig and is an honorary member of the club.

== Events ==
Championship and qualifying history
Tournament	Year(s)
The Open Championship Final Qualifying	1984, 1990, 1995, 2000, 2001, 2010
Scottish Seniors Championship	2002
Ladies Home Internationals	2013
Scottish Boys & Girls Amateur Championships	2017
Senior Open Championship Qualifying	2018
Scottish PGA Championship	2023, 2025
