= Celine Borge =

Norwegian professional golfer (born 1998)

Personal information
- Nationality: Norway
- Born: 5 August 1998 (age 28) Tønsberg, Norway
- Height: 1.67 m (5 ft 6 in)

Career
- Sport: Golf
- Turned professional: 2018
- Current tours: Ladies European Tour (joined 2018); LPGA Tour (joined 2023)
- Former tour: Epson Tour
- Professional wins: 2

Number of wins by tour
- Epson Tour: 1
- Other: 1

Best results in LPGA major championships
- Chevron Championship: CUT: 2023, 2024
- Women's PGA C'ship: T39: 2023
- U.S. Women's Open: 58th: 2025
- Women's British Open: DNP
- Evian Championship: T3: 2023

Celine Borge (born 5 August 1998) is a Norwegian professional golfer who joined the Ladies European Tour in 2018, and the LPGA Tour in 2023. She won the 2022 Tuscaloosa Toyota Classic on the Epson Tour.

== Amateur career ==
Borge played for the National Team and appeared in several European Team Championships. She won the Irish Girls U18 Open Stroke Play Championship in 2016, four strokes ahead of Cloe Frankish and Linn Grant in joint second.

== Professional career ==
In 2017, still a teenager, Borge finished in the top-25 at the 2017 Lalla Aicha Tour School, to earn Ladies European Tour membership for 2018. She finished 53rd in the Order of Merit and 5th in the Rookie of the Year rankings.

Borge joined the Symetra Tour in 2019, where she made 10 cuts in 21 events and recorded a season-best T9 at The CDPHP Open.

She won the 2020 Norwegian National Golf Championship and was awarded the Kongepokal. She finished third at the 2021 Island Resort Championship.

In 2022, Borge won the Tuscaloosa Toyota Classic and was runner-up at the Guardian Championship to end the season sixth on the Epson Tour money list, earning LPGA Tour membership for the 2023.

On her LPGA Tour debut at the 2023 LPGA Drive On Championship, Borge was in contention after a 9-under 63 in the third round, and finished tied 14th.

Borge opened with two rounds of 69 to sit at tied 2nd at the halfway point of the 2023 Women's PGA Championship, before finishing the tournament in tied 39th after rounds of 74 and 75.

Her best finish in a LPGA Tour event is third place at the Dow Great Lakes Bay Invitational, teamed with Polly Mack, in July 2023.

== Amateur wins ==
- 2014 Norgescupfinale
- 2015 Norgescupfinale
- 2016 Irish Girls U18 Open Stroke Play Championship, Norgescup 2, Titleist Tour 4, Titleist Tour 7

== Professional wins (2) ==
=== Epson Tour wins (1) ===
No.	Date	Tournament	Winning score	Margin of victory	Runner-up
1	1 Oct 2022	Tuscaloosa Toyota Classic	201 (−15)	1 stroke	(South Korea) Jang Hyo-joon

=== Other wins (1) ===
- 2020 Norwegian National Golf Championship

== Results in LPGA majors ==
Tournament	2023	2024	2025
Chevron Championship	CUT	CUT	
U.S. Women's Open		CUT	58
Women's PGA Championship	T39	T46	
The Evian Championship	T3	CUT	
Women's British Open			

Top 10
Did not play

CUT = missed the half-way cut
T = tied

== Team appearances ==
Amateur

- Duke of York Young Champions Trophy: (representing Norway): 2015, 2016
- World Junior Girls Championship: (representing Norway): 2016
- European Girls' Team Championship: (representing Norway): 2015, 2016
- European Ladies' Team Championship: (representing Norway): 2017
