= Hinton =

Hinton may refer to:

== Places ==
=== Australia ===
- Hinton, New South Wales

=== Canada ===
- Hinton, Alberta
  - Hinton/Entrance Airport
  - Hinton/Jasper-Hinton Airport
  - Hinton CN railway station

=== England ===
- Hinton, Dorset, a civil parish
  - Hinton Martell, Dorset
  - Hinton Parva, Dorset
- Hinton, South Gloucestershire, Gloucestershire
- Hinton, Stroud, Gloucestershire, a village near Berkeley
- Hinton, Hampshire
- Hinton, Herefordshire
- Hinton, Northamptonshire
- Hinton, Shropshire
- Hinton, Somerset
- Hinton, Suffolk
- Hinton Admiral, Hampshire
  - Hinton Admiral railway station
- Hinton Ampner, Hampshire
- Hinton Blewett, Somerset
- Hinton Charterhouse, Somerset
- Hinton Daubney, Hampshire
- Hinton Parva, Wiltshire, also known as Little Hinton
- Hinton St George, Somerset
- Hinton St Mary, Dorset
- Hinton Waldrist, Oxfordshire
- Hinton-in-the-Hedges, Northamptonshire
- Hinton on the Green, Worcestershire
- Broad Hinton, Wiltshire
- Cherry Hinton, Cambridgeshire
- Great Hinton, Wiltshire
- Tarrant Hinton, Dorset

=== United States ===
- Hinton, California
- Hinton, Iowa
- Hinton, Missouri
- Hinton, Oklahoma
- Hinton, West Virginia
  - Hinton (Amtrak station)
- Hinton Township, Michigan

== Other ==
- Hinton (name)
- Hinton station (disambiguation), railroad stations of the name
