= History of Bournemouth =

Coastal city in southern England

The history of Bournemouth and human settlement in the surrounding area goes back for thousands of years. Bournemouth is a coastal town on the island of Great Britain in Dorset, England, United Kingdom.

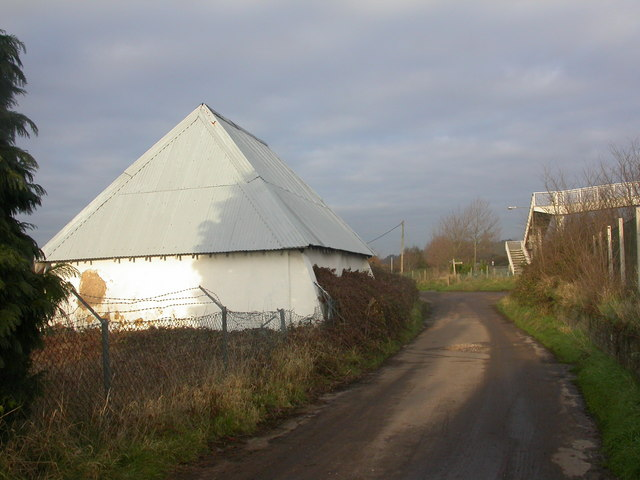
Oldest Dwelling in Bournemouth, a Cob barn thought to be over 500 years old

== Before Inclosure ==
In 1800, the area was largely a remote and barren heathland, used only by smugglers – most notably Isaac Gulliver, now considered one of the founding fathers of Bournemouth – and revenue troops. 'Bourne Heath' was also known as Wallis Down in the north and Little Down in the south and east, and was part of the Great Heath of central Dorset which extended as far as Dorchester. To the east was Christchurch, to the west was Poole and to the north east was the River Stour. There were villages at Kinson, Throop, Holdenhurst (where the oldest dwelling is located) and Iford and a handful of buildings at Pokesdown but the area between these communities was just a wilderness of pine trees, gorse, ferns and heather. The area now called central Bournemouth and the Pier Approach was 'Bourne Mouth' – the mouth of the Bourne Stream. No-one lived at Bourne Mouth and the only regular visitors were a few fishermen, turf cutters and gangs of smugglers who landed their cargoes of spirits, tea and tobacco on the deserted beach.

The eastern part of the heath was called the Liberty of West Stour (later, the Liberty of Westover). It was divided into six tythings: 'Muscliff', 'Muccleshell', 'Throop', 'Holdenhurst', 'Iford' and 'Tuckton & Wick'. These areas were common land used by the inhabitants for livestock and by the poor for wood and turves.

The western and southern parts of the heath had once been a hunting estate 'Stourfield Chase' but by the late 18th century only a small part of this was maintained: the 'Decoy Pond Estate' (now known as 'Coy Pond' and being wholly in the neighbouring historic town of Poole) comprising several fields around the Bourne Stream and including a cottage known as Decoy Pond House, which stood near where The Square is today.

== Christchurch Inclosure Act 1802 ==
Until 1802 the area was common land. The Christchurch Inclosures Act 1802 and the Inclosure Commissioners' Award of 1805 transferred hundreds of acres into private ownership for the first time. To implement the Act, three Commissioners were appointed to divide up the land and allot it according to an individual's entitlement. They were also empowered to set out the roads and to sell plots of land to pay for their work in creating the award. The Commissioners were Richard Richardson of Lincoln's Inn Fields, John Wickens of Mapperton and William Calpcott of Holdenhurst. Their clerk was William Baldwin of Ringwood.

Whilst the landed gentry were well represented with the Commissioners, the ordinary commoners who used and depended on the common land were concerned that they would lose all rights and would have nowhere for their animals and nowhere from which to collect wood and turves. However, they managed to persuade William West, the farmer at Muscliff Farm, to create a petition on their behalf and to present it to the Commissioners at a meeting in Ringwood. The result was that five areas of land, totalling 425 acres (1.72 km^{2}), were set aside for the benefit of the occupiers of certain cottages "in lieu of their Rights or pretended Rights or customs in cutting Turves". These five areas are today known as 'Meyrick Park', 'Queen's Park', 'King's Park', 'Redhill Common' and 'Seafield Gardens' and are held in trust by the Five Parks Charity.

More than half the land sold was bought by two men, William Dean of Littledown House, who paid £639 for 500 acres (2.0 km^{2}) including the West Cliff and what is now King's Park. Sir George Ivison Tapps, the Lord of the manor of Christchurch, paid £1,050 for 205 acres (0.83 km^{2}) including the East Cliff and part of central Bournemouth. Sir George decided to plant thousands of pine trees on his land.

In 1809, a new building appeared on the heath. Originally called the Tapps Arms after Sir George Tapps, and later the Tregonwell Arms. It stood where Post Office Road meets Old Christchurch Road. The pub was a favourite haunt of smugglers and later became Bournemouth's first post office. It was demolished in 1885.

When retired army officer Lewis Tregonwell visited in 1810, he found only a bridge crossing a small stream at the head of an unspoilt valley (or 'chine') that led out into Poole Bay. An inn had recently been built near what is now The Square (the centre of Bournemouth), catering both for travellers and for the smugglers who lurked in the area at night. Captain Tregonwell and his wife were so impressed by the area that they bought several acres and built a home, which is today part of the Royal Exeter Hotel. Tregonwell also planted pine trees, providing a sheltered walk to the beach. The town was to grow up around its scattered pines. Twenty-five years after the Tregonwells started work on their holiday mansion, Bournemouth was still only a small community with a scattering of houses and cottages.

== Growth and development as a resort ==
In 1835 after the death of Sir George Ivison Tapps, his son Sir George William Tapps-Gervis inherited his father's estate and started developing the seaside village into a resort similar to those that had already grown up along the south coast such as Weymouth and Brighton. Sir George employed Christchurch architect Benjamin Ferrey to plan the Gervis Estate. The Westover Villas were commenced in 1837. Ferrey included hotels in his design for Bournemouth. The first two hotels opened in 1838. One was the Bath Hotel, which went on to become the Royal Bath, although the original building was much smaller and less grand than the current facility. The other was the Belle Vue Boarding House, which stood where the Pavilion is now and later became the Belle Vue and Pier Hotel. The 1830s also saw the beginnings of Bournemouth Gardens.

Bournemouth also acquired its first church in 1838; before this people had to travel to Poole, Holdenhurst or Christchurch for Sunday worship. The first church was converted from a pair of semi-detached cottages which stood in The Square roughly where Debenhams is today. A pointed turret was added to the roof and fitted with a bell. During the week the building was used as a schoolroom.

In 1840, Bournemouth was officially referred to as a single word.

By 1841, there were still only a few hundred people living in Bournemouth but that was soon to change. In that year the seaside village had an important visitor, a physician called Augustus Bozzi Granville, the author of a book called The Spas of England which described health resorts around the country. As a result of his visit, Dr Granville included a chapter on Bournemouth in the second edition of his book. It was this more than anything that put the town on the map as the perfect place for people with health problems, especially chest complaints which were far more common in the 19th century than today.

Bournemouth quickly became a destination for affluent holiday-makers and for invalids in search of the sea air. In the 1840s, the fields south of the road crossing (later The Square) were drained and laid out with shrubberies and walks.

In 1849, a bridge was built over the Bourne Stream, providing the beginning of The Square.

In 1856, Parliament approved the Bournemouth Improvement Act. Under the Act, a board of 13 Commissioners was established to organise all the things involved in the running of a small but growing town, such as paving, sewers, drainage, street lighting and street cleaning. Under the guidance of their surveyor, Christopher Crabb Creeke, the Bournemouth Commissioners quickly launched a programme of work designed to improve the amenities of their town and make it more attractive to visitors. The Commissioners continued to govern the town until 1890 and were the forerunners of the Bournemouth Borough Council of today.

By the 1860s, the fields to the north were also laid out with walks by the owners of the Branksome Estate.

In the early 1870s all the fields were leased to the Bournemouth Commissioners, by the freeholders. These fields now form The Pleasure Gardens, which run through the centre of the town; although the name The Lower Pleasure Gardens is no longer officially applied to the area south of The Square. The area continued to progress with the development of the railways and the popular idea of visiting the seaside for holidays. Among the people who contributed to the development of Bournemouth at this time were Sir Percy Shelley (son of Percy Bysshe Shelley and Mary Shelley) and Sir Merton Russell-Cotes.

The Holdenhurst Road drill hall was completed in 1897.

== History of transport in Bournemouth ==
=== Railway ===
On 14 March 1870, the London and South Western Railway Company opened the first railway station in the town, following an extension of the Ringwood-Christchurch branch line. The station was built on the east side of Holdenhurst Road. The facilities offered by this station were very basic. On 18 June 1874 a second station opened in Queens Road, near Westbourne, at the end of an extension from Broadstone Junction. It was served initially only by the Somerset and Dorset Joint Railway with trains connecting with the LSWR at Wimborne. On 20 July 1885 the present mainline station, designed by William Jacob, was opened on the west side of Holdenhurst Road. A link between the two stations, then known as Bournemouth West and Bournemouth East, was opened on 28 September 1886. Also in 1886 a Boscombe station was opened, the name was later changed to Pokesdown (Boscombe). In 1897 when a new Boscombe station (since closed) was opened on land situated between Ashley Road and Gloucester Road, the original was renamed Pokesdown. The new Bournemouth East station was renamed Bournemouth Central on 1 May 1899. The building of railway links made Bournemouth much easier to get to and more people began to visit the town.

=== Tram ===
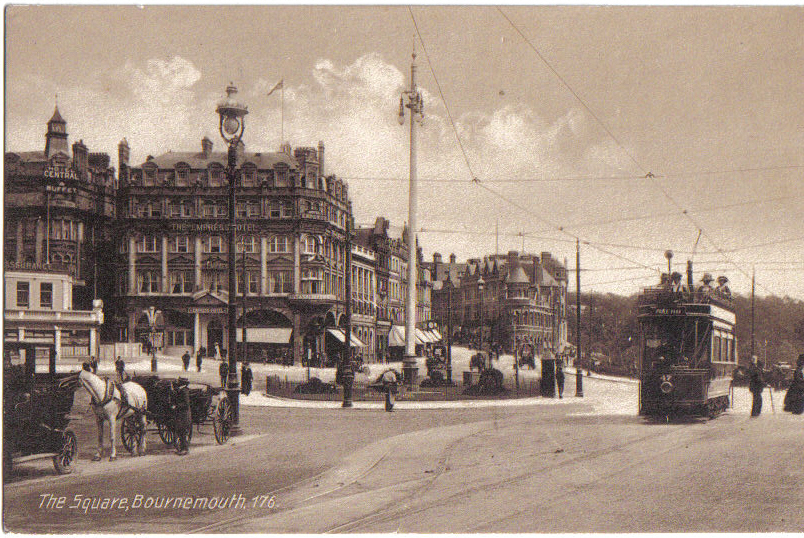
The Square in Bournemouth with a tram c1910.

Between July 1902 and April 1936, Bournemouth Corporation operated a tramway between Bournemouth, Poole, Christchurch and Winton. On 1 May 1908, a tram was derailed on Avenue Road (near to the present day library), killing 7 people and seriously injuring 2. The tramway system began its closure in 1929 when motorbuses of Hants and Dorset Motor Services were introduced as a tram replacement on the Lower Parkstone route. Bournemouth tram number 85 is preserved and on static display at the Museum of Electricity in Christchurch.

=== Trolleybuses ===
The town also had an extensive network which opened on 13 May 1933 and closed on 20 April 1969.

== The Pleasure Gardens and the sanatorium ==
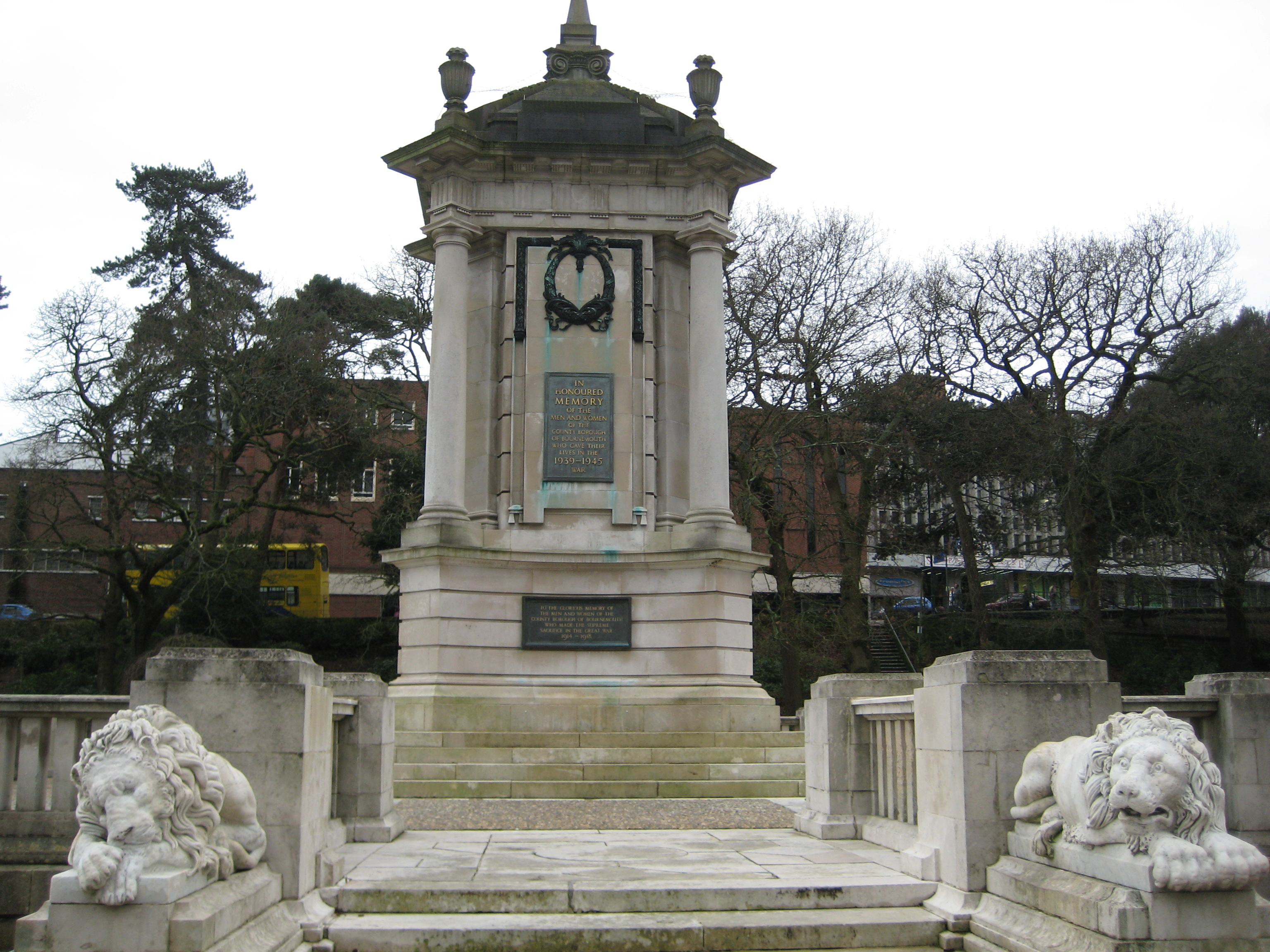
The Bournemouth War Memorial, built in 1921, located in the central gardens.

The Pleasure Gardens are still an important landmark and the Central Gardens contain the town's impressive war memorial, guarded by two stone lions. The War Memorial was installed in 1921 when the Borough Council moved to the adjacent Mont Dore Hotel, which it still occupies. Various building works were carried out – such as the Saint Stephen's Road bridge – to stamp the municipal identity on this area of the town; the war memorial was one of them. It was designed by Bournemouth's deputy architect Albert Edward Shervey, who copied the two lions (one sleeping, the other awake and roaring) from Antonio Cavona's lions which guarded the tomb of Pope Clement XIII.

A large sanatorium, overlooking the Central Gardens, treated patients with chest diseases. It has recently been re-developed as Brompton Court, a complex of retirement homes, preserving its remarkable chapel. Next to the sanatorium was built the magnificent Mont Dore Hotel, which is now Bournemouth Town Hall. In the hotel's heyday in the 1880s it was renowned nationally and internationally for its sumptuous luxury which included possessing one of the first telephones in England – the number was "3". The hotel was then used during the First World War as a hospital to treat wounded soldiers. Although the number of invalids sent to the town dropped in the late 19th century, the resort was still booming and its population increasing rapidly. As Bournemouth's popularity increased, the town centre spawned theatres, concert halls, cafés, cinemas and more hotels.

== History of Bournemouth Pier ==
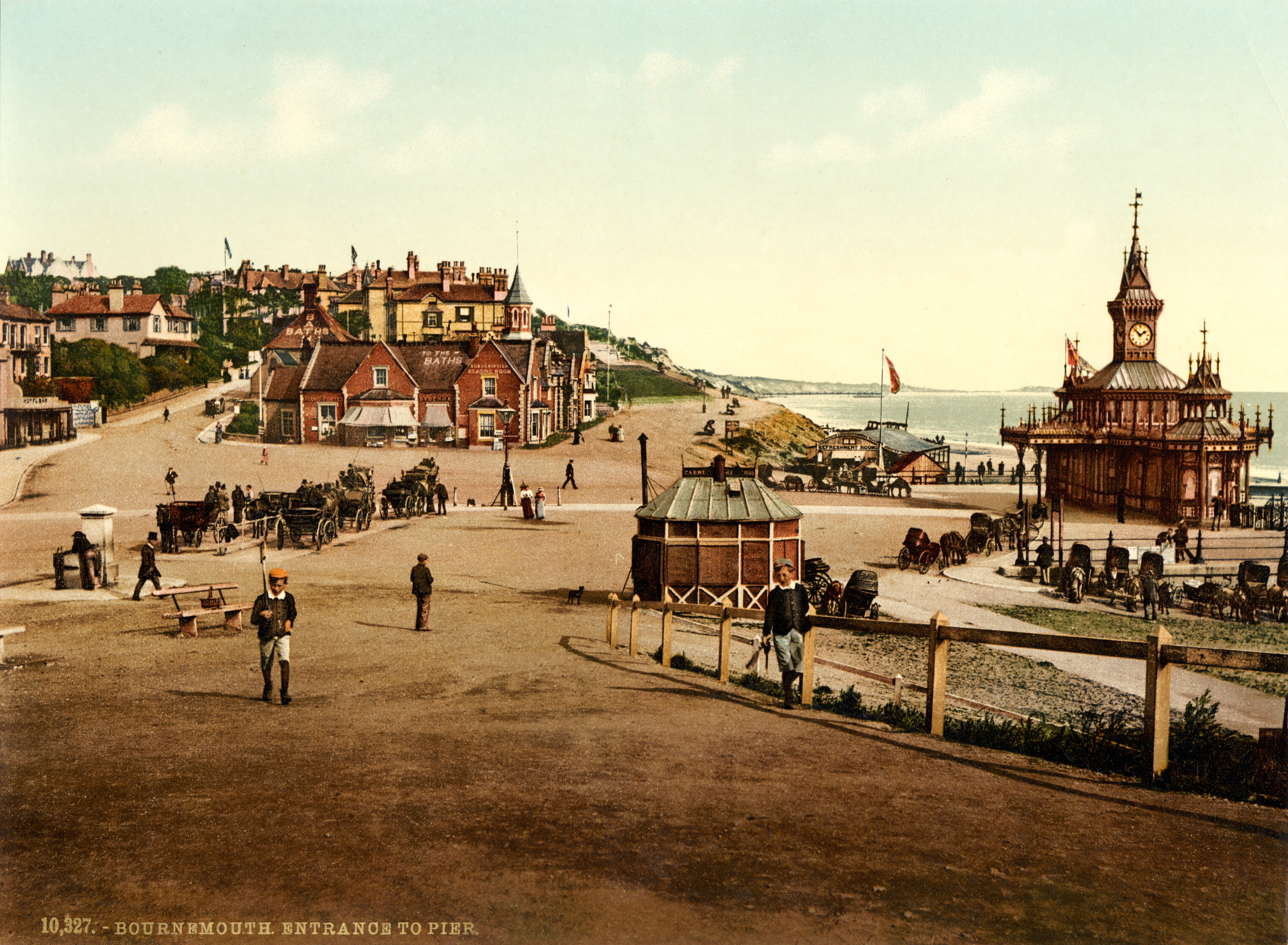
Pier approach, 1890s

The first pier in Bournemouth consisted of a short wooden jetty that was completed by the Bournemouth Improvement Commissioners in 1856. This was replaced by a much longer wooden pier, designed by George Rennie, which opened on 17 September 1861. Due to an attack by Teredo worm, the wooden piles were removed in favour of cast iron replacements in 1866, but even with this additional benefit just over a year later the pier was made unusable when the T-shaped landing stage was swept away in a gale. After repairs, the pier continued in use for a further ten years until November 1876 when another severe storm caused further collapse rendering the pier too short for steamboat traffic. The Rennie pier was subsequently demolished, and replaced in 1877 by a temporary structure. During the next three years a new pier, designed by Eugenius Birch, was completed by the Bournemouth Promenade Pier Company.

At a cost of £2,600 the new Bournemouth Pier was opened by the Lord Mayor of London on 11 August 1880. Consisting of an open promenade, it stretched to a length of 838 ft (255.4 m) and spanned some 35 ft (10.6 m) across the neck of the pier, extending to 110 ft (33.3 m) at the head. With the addition of a bandstand in 1885, military band concerts took place three times a day in summer and twice daily throughout the winter. Covered shelters were also provided at this time. Two extensions, in 1894 and 1909 respectively, took the pier's overall length to more than 1000 ft (304.8 m).

In common with virtually all other piers in the south and east of the country, Bournemouth Pier was substantially demolished by soldiers from the 18th Field Park Company of the Royal Engineers on 5 July 1940 as a precaution against German invasion. The pier was repaired and re-opened in August 1946. Refurbishment of the pier head was carried out in 1950, and ten years later a rebuild of the substructure was completed in concrete to take the weight of a new pier theatre. A structural survey of 1976 found major areas of corrosion, and in 1979 a £1.7m restoration programme was initiated. Having demolished the old shoreward end buildings, replacing them with a new two-storey octagonal leisure complex, and reconstructed the pier neck in concrete giving it the bridge-like appearance that it retains today, the work was completed in two years.

As of 2019, the council levies a charge to walk on the pier during peak season – early April until late October. The charge is £1.20 for adults and 80 pence for children. Bournemouth, Christchurch and Poole Council plan to repair the pier in 2025.

== World War Two ==
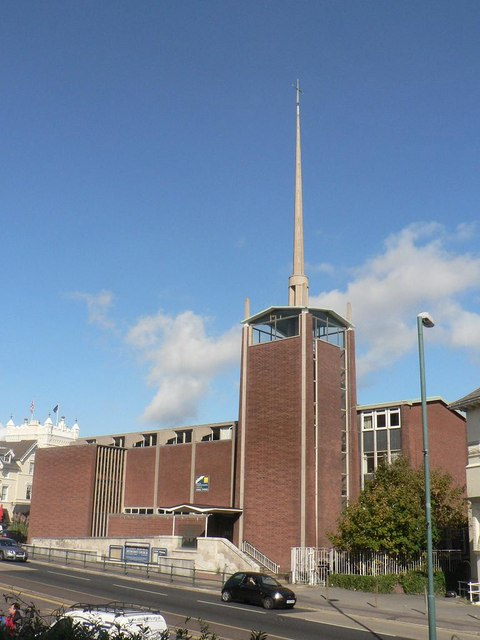
The rebuilt Methodist Church on Exeter Road.

In World War II, the town was hit by Air Raids. The section of the coast both to the east and to the west of Bournemouth was very important during the Second World War. For example, Poole (Poole Harbour) was the departure point for many ships participating in the D-Day landings, and Studland Bay (just south of Poole) was the scene of practice live fire beach landings in preparation for the Normandy Landings. Bournemouth itself was not a main target of bombing during the war but was on the route for other raids (e.g. on Coventry) and German bombers were known to unload their spare bombs on the town; 219 civilians were killed by bombing during the war, 2,200 bombs dropped and almost 14,000 buildings damaged.

During World War II a Bournemouth man lost his life when his Royal Air Force training airplane crashed in the United States. Local residents living near the site, in the State of Oklahoma, erected a monument in 2000 honouring the lives of all four RAF fliers who perished. The residents, who include Choctaw Indians and the Choctaw Nation government, continue honouring the lives of all four on each anniversary of the crashes, which took place in February 1943.

The Methodist Church on Exeter Road was destroyed and 77 people were killed. In 1944, a Halifax Bomber crashed in Moordown killing nine people.

== The Winter Gardens ==
The town's first large entertainment venue was the original glass Winter Gardens, built in 1875 as the home of the town's municipal orchestra, (now the internationally renowned Bournemouth Symphony Orchestra). Elgar, Sibelius and Holst conducted there, but the acoustics were reputedly poor. In 1935, the original Winter Gardens was demolished. Its replacement, opened two years later, was intended as an indoor bowls centre, but by chance turned out to have superb acoustics, and after the Second World War it became the orchestra's new home.

Before the opening of the Bournemouth International Centre, the Winter Gardens welcomed many major entertainers of the day, including Maurice Chevalier, The Beatles, Pink Floyd, Queen and Morecambe and Wise. The building had been in decline since the late 1970s, and stood closed as the town council examined alternative uses. Despite a local vote and promises that it would be kept open, the hall was demolished in May 2006.

== The Pavilion and the Westover Road cinemas ==
The Pavilion dates from 1925 and was built on the site of the former Belle Vue boarding house, one of the town's first buildings. Theatrical legends, including Ralph Richardson and Trevor Howard, played the Pavilion Theatre in its heyday. The Pavilion faces the cinemas and upmarket shops of Westover Road, which prides itself on being the town's "Bond Street".

Westover Road's Odeon cinema began life as the Regent in 1929 and retains many of the art deco features of the era. It was known as the Gaumont from 1949–86 and used to host live performances as well as films. Stars who appeared there included Ella Fitzgerald, Dusty Springfield, Victor Borge and, in 1963, the Beatles. The cinema now has six screens.

The nearby ABC cinema dates from 1937, when it contained one 2,600-seater auditorium. It has three auditoriums today, one of them boasting the areas largest cinema screen, and is capable of projecting epics in 70mm. Recent research has suggested that local residents, especially those of a younger demographic are keen to see a new live entertainment venue, easily accessible to the surrounding areas.

Both cinemas closed in early 2017 to make way for a new Odeon multiplex in the BH2 leisure complex.

== Recent history ==
After the Second World War, Bournemouth saw a period of decline as a seaside resort and a tourist destination, similar to other resorts across England. However the population of the town and its surrounding suburbs continued to grow at a considerable rate. In 1880, the town had a population of 17,000 people. By 1900 this had risen to 60,000, and by 1990 it had more than doubled again, reaching 150,000. In the latest census, the town had a population of 163,441. Since the 1990s there have been increasing calls for the town, together with Poole, to attain official city status (as per the example of Brighton & Hove) due to its expanse and regional importance.

A local government reorganisation of county boundaries saw Bournemouth being moved from Hampshire to Dorset in 1974. In 1997, Bournemouth became a unitary authority.

On 15 September 1980 Bournemouth was one of the first areas outside a major city to get its own independent radio station. 2CR FM broadcast from near Bournemouth railway station; its name, meaning 2 Counties' Radio, is derived from the fact that its broadcast area includes parts of the counties of Dorset and Hampshire.

Bournemouth was the first local council in the UK to install CCTV cameras in public places, introducing them on the seafront in 1985.

In the 1990s a leisure complex including an IMAX cinema was constructed on the sea front by Bournemouth Pier. The building itself proved deeply unpopular amongst locals for its lack of aesthetic quality and for blocking the sea view. It featured on and came second in Demolition, a 2005 Channel 4 programme asking the public to choose the building that they most wanted to demolish. The building was demolished in 2013.

A new £9.5 million Bournemouth Library was completed in 2003, winning the Prime Minister's Better Public Building Award in the British Construction Industry Awards competition in recognition of its relatively low cost and high fit with client requirements.

In recent years the town has attracted a high number of jobs in financial services, with JP Morgan Chase, Liverpool Victoria, Abbey Life and Portman Building Society all opening major offices. JP Morgan Chase has a large campus style office on the outskirts of the town in the Littledown area supplemented by further offices in the town centre, and employs over 4,000 people in the town.

In 2010, Bournemouth celebrated its bicentenary. In 2012 Bournemouth was unsuccessful in its bid for city status, losing out to Chelmsford, Essex in competition with 26 other towns to commemorate Queen Elizabeth II's Diamond Jubilee. Bournemouth sought city status once again for the Platinum Jubilee Civic Honours in 2022 but was unsuccessful.

The town itself has continued to expand its business and tourist destination potential. The Bournemouth Big Wheel, for example, is situated at Pier Approach.

On 28 April 2015, AFC Bournemouth gained promotion to the Premier League, marking their first time in the top tier of English football since their founding in 1899.

In February 2017, a new complex called BH2 opened in the town centre, housing a state of the art multiplex cinema, with an I-sense experience and other cinemas with reclining seats. The complex also houses at least 12 restaurants and an underground car park for up to 250 cars. This replaces both the Odeon and ABC cinemas in Westover Road, which have now closed.

In 2019, the council was abolished as Bournemouth became part of the new Bournemouth, Christchurch and Poole unitary authority area.

In 2022, both of the towns Conservative MPs, Conor Burns (Bournemouth West) and Tobias Ellwood (Bournemouth East) had the whip withdrawn forcing them to sit as Independents.

On 13 March 2022, 21-year-old Thomas Roberts was stabbed to death in Bournemouth Town Centre by Lawangeen Abdulrahimzai in a high-profile murder case.

On 31 May 2023, two people died and eight others were injured in an incident at Bournemouth beach.
