= East Close House =

Country house in Hampshire, England

Coordinates: 50.7714°N 1.6964°W

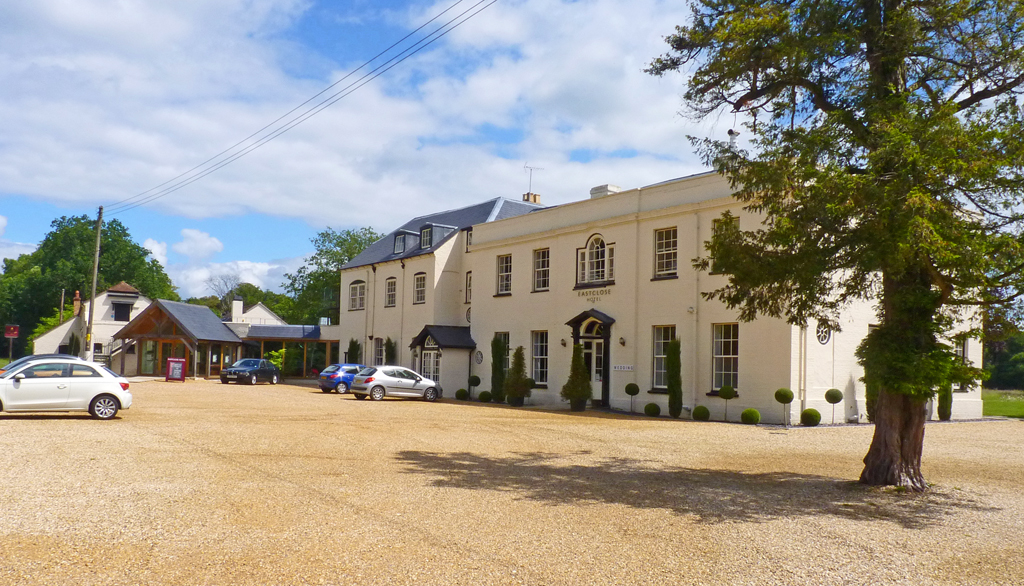
East Close Hotel.

East Close House in Hinton, Hampshire, near Christchurch, Dorset, is a building of historical significance and a grade II listed building on the English Heritage Register. A mansion house stood on the site by 1742, which may be that crudely illustrated on Taylor's Hampshire map of 1759. Many notable people resided here before its conversion to a hotel in the 1930s. It was announced in August 2018 that the hotel would close later in the year.

== William Hillman ==
In May 1719 a wealthy apothecary and former mayor of Salisbury, William Hillman (1673–1741), purchased East Close Farm from the descendants of Henry Hastings, together with other property valued in total at £4,110. The property appears to have been a part of the estate at North Hinton held by Christchurch Priory until its dissolution in 1539, following which the re-parcelling of land probably led to the creation of East Close, the first-known mention of which is in a deed of 1556.

Hillman was born in 1673 after the death of his father, Rawlins Hillman, a prosperous farmer at Amesbury, and so missed out on the bequests granted to his older siblings. However, on his mother's remarriage that same year he was granted £20 towards an apprenticeship together with the promise of a lump sum of £80 on attaining the age of 21. Hillman was a keen promoter of the Salisbury Avon Navigation, and was to have been one of thirteen directors following what turned out to be the ill-fated share subscription scheme of 1720. He died leaving all of his real estate to his son, also William (1713–73), who was later to be the immediate predecessor of Jane Austen's father as Rector of Deane, Hampshire. By September 1742, Hillman jr. had leased out East Close Farm but retained 'the Capital messuage & mansion house of East Close' together with ancillary buildings (including coach-houses), pasture, and woodland. It is therefore probable that the mansion house was built by his father some time between 1720 and 1740, shortly after the construction nearby of Hinton Admiral House.

William Hillman jr. married Hannah Clarke, daughter of the mathematician John Clarke, in January 1743. He was resident at East Close in the 1750s, and was one of the subscribers who sponsored Taylor's 1759 map. East Close was worth at least £100 per annum in 1761, qualifying Hillman to serve as a Justice of the Peace, although from 1764 until 1771 he lived instead at Ashe Park in north Hampshire. He spent much of 1771 visiting Paris and Lausanne with his wife and son. This son and heir, Edward, sold the 720-acre estate to Sir Jacob Wolff for £4,000 in 1786.

== Abraham and Margaret Spalding ==
Abraham Spalding (1712–82), an immensely wealthy Swedish merchant, leased East Close House while Hillman was at Ashe Park. A letter was written to Spalding's sister Sibylla Soddherland (née Dickson) in 1769 when she was staying with them and gives her address as East Close near Christchurch. The previous year Sibylla wrote a letter mentioning that her sister Margaret Spalding was putting her Hinton house in order.

Abraham Spalding was born in Sweden, but became a naturalized British citizen in 1743. In London, together with his cousin, Gustavus Brander (who also later resided at Christchurch), he established the firm of Spalding and Brander which specialised in the import of Swedish steel and timber. They were very successful business men and both became interested in scientific and cultural pursuits. Abraham was a member of several English scientific societies.

In 1767 Abraham married Margaret Dickson in Kensington London. The couple had no children and lived at Hinton and in London until 1782 when Abraham died. He was buried at Christchurch Priory.

== John Levett and Mary Hawkes ==
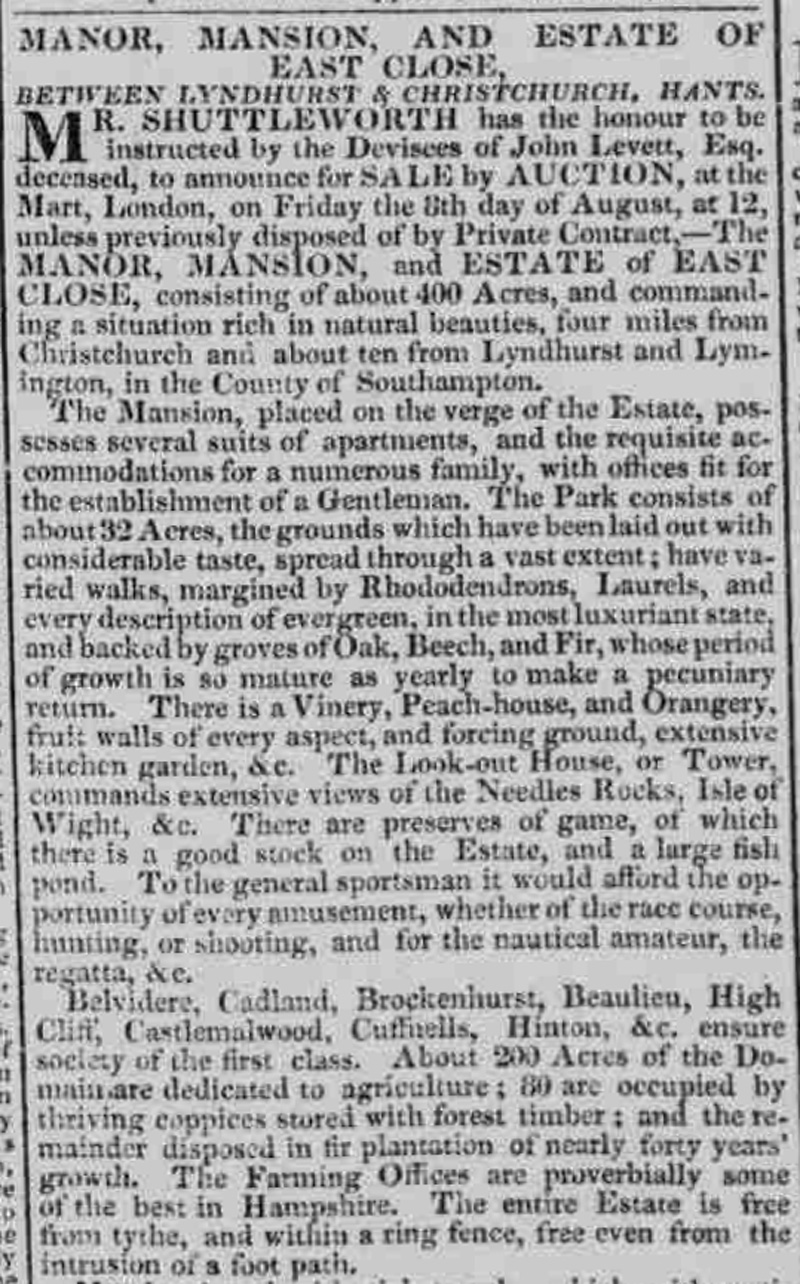
Advertisement for the sale of East Close 1834

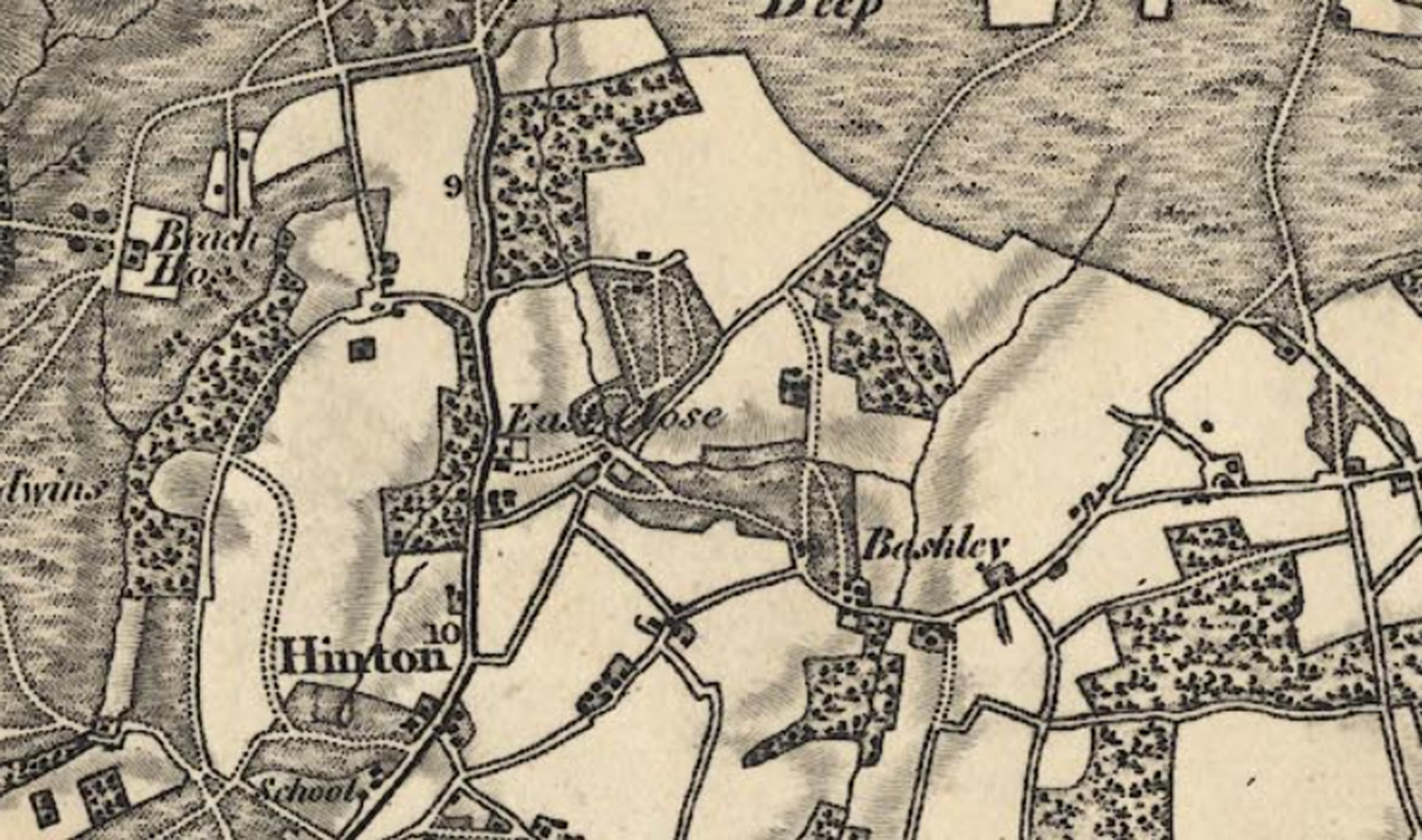
Map of East Close (1846) showing some of the paths, trees and ponds outlined in the sale advertisement.

John Levett (1725–1807) bought the property from Wolff for £6,000 in 1792 and lived there until his death in 1807. Living with him during this time was Mary Hawkes (1763–1834) but there is some mystery about her relationship with him. When he died his will stated that she would own the house until her death after which it would be inherited by his nephew. She was about 40 years younger than he so it is not known whether she was his illegitimate daughter, de facto wife or housekeeper/carer.

John Levett was born in 1725. His father was John Levett and his mother was Charlotte de Peleran, daughter of French diplomat Pierre Armand de Peleran. His father was an English merchant who conducted his business in Turkey and his brother was Francis Levett a very wealthy merchant who acquired property in Florida. John also became a merchant and was an influential businessman in Calcutta. For some years he was alderman and later the Mayor of Calcutta.

When he died in 1807 he was buried in the Priory Church in Christchurch. Mary Hawkes became the proprietor of East Close and lived there as a recluse. A newspaper article stated that she "was a lady of considerable wealth but of the most eccentric manners and had for a great number of years lived in a state of entire seclusion constantly refusing to be seen by anyone but her servant." When she died the house reverted to the John Levett Estate and was inherited by Levett's relatives. They sold the house in 1834 and a description of it is given in the sale notice. Part of it reads as follows.

"The mansion placed on the verge of the estate possesses several suites of apartments and the requisite accommodation for a numerous family, with offices fit for the establishment of a Gentleman. The Park consists of about 32 acres the grounds which have been laid out with considerable taste spread through a vast extent. They have varied walks margined by Rhododendrons, Laurels and every description of evergreens in the most luxuriant state and backed by groves of Oak Beech and Fir. There is a vinery, peach house and orangery, fruit walls of every aspect, forcing ground and extensive kitchen garden. The Look Out House or Tower commands extensive views of the Needles Rocks and Isle of Wight. There are preserves of game and a large fish pond."

A map of Hinton drawn in 1846 gives an outline of the walks, trees and pond that exist at East Close at this time. The tower mentioned in the advertisement seems to have been a notable feature of the garden as it is mentioned in a touring guide of the area in 1819. The guide says that on the right is East Hinton (another name for East Close) and there is a summer house in the grounds which a stranger may mistake for the tower of a Church.""

After Mary's death there was a large sale of the house contents and an auction catalogue was produced. A copy of this can be seen at this reference.

== The Tapps-Gervis-Meyrick family ==
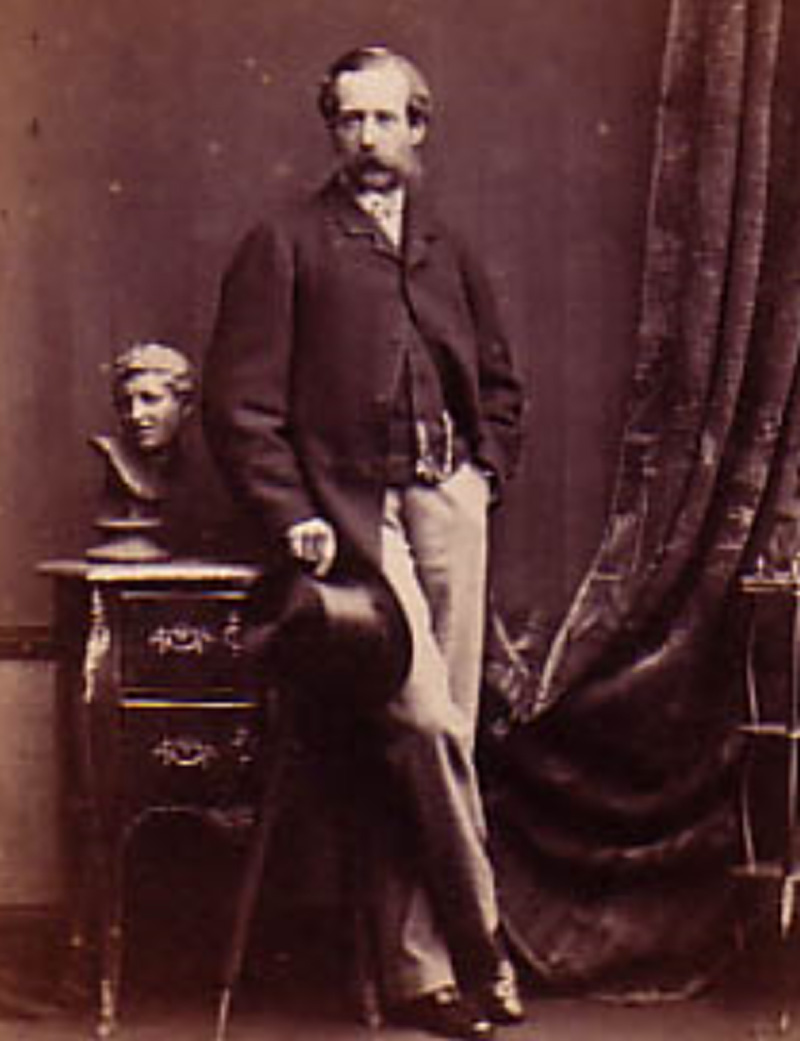
Sir George Elliot Tapps-Gervis-Meyrick, 3rd Baronet.

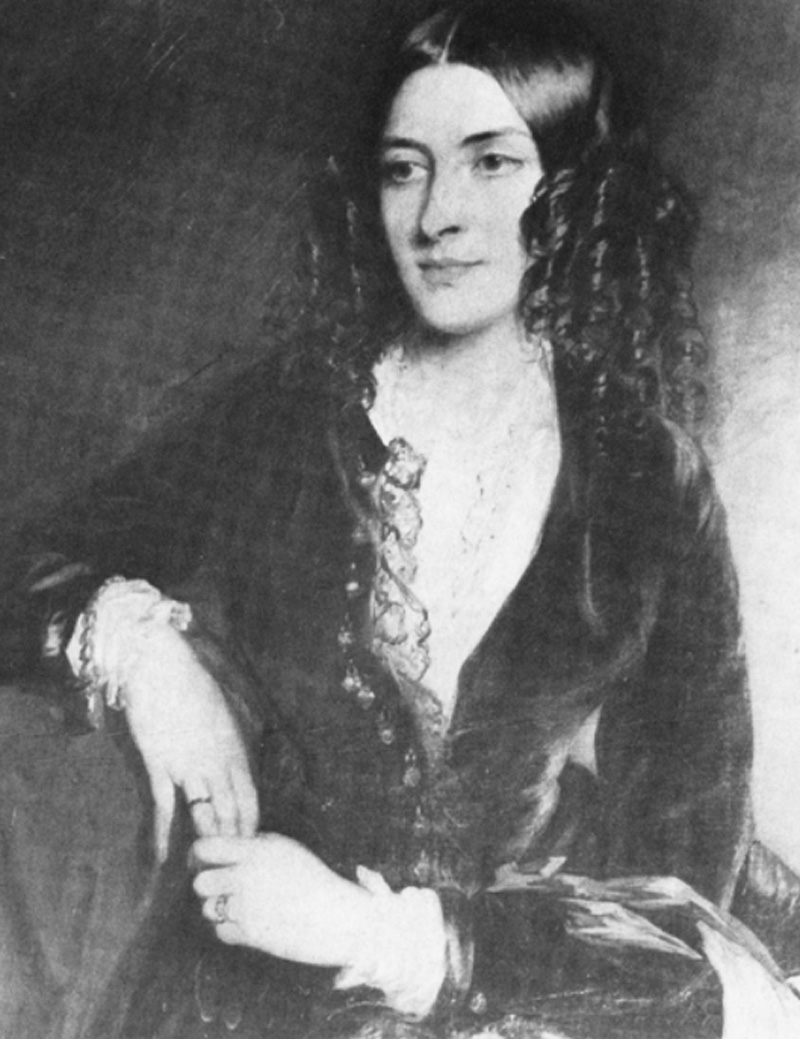
Lady Fanny Tapps-Gervis-Meyrick wife of the 3rd Baronet.

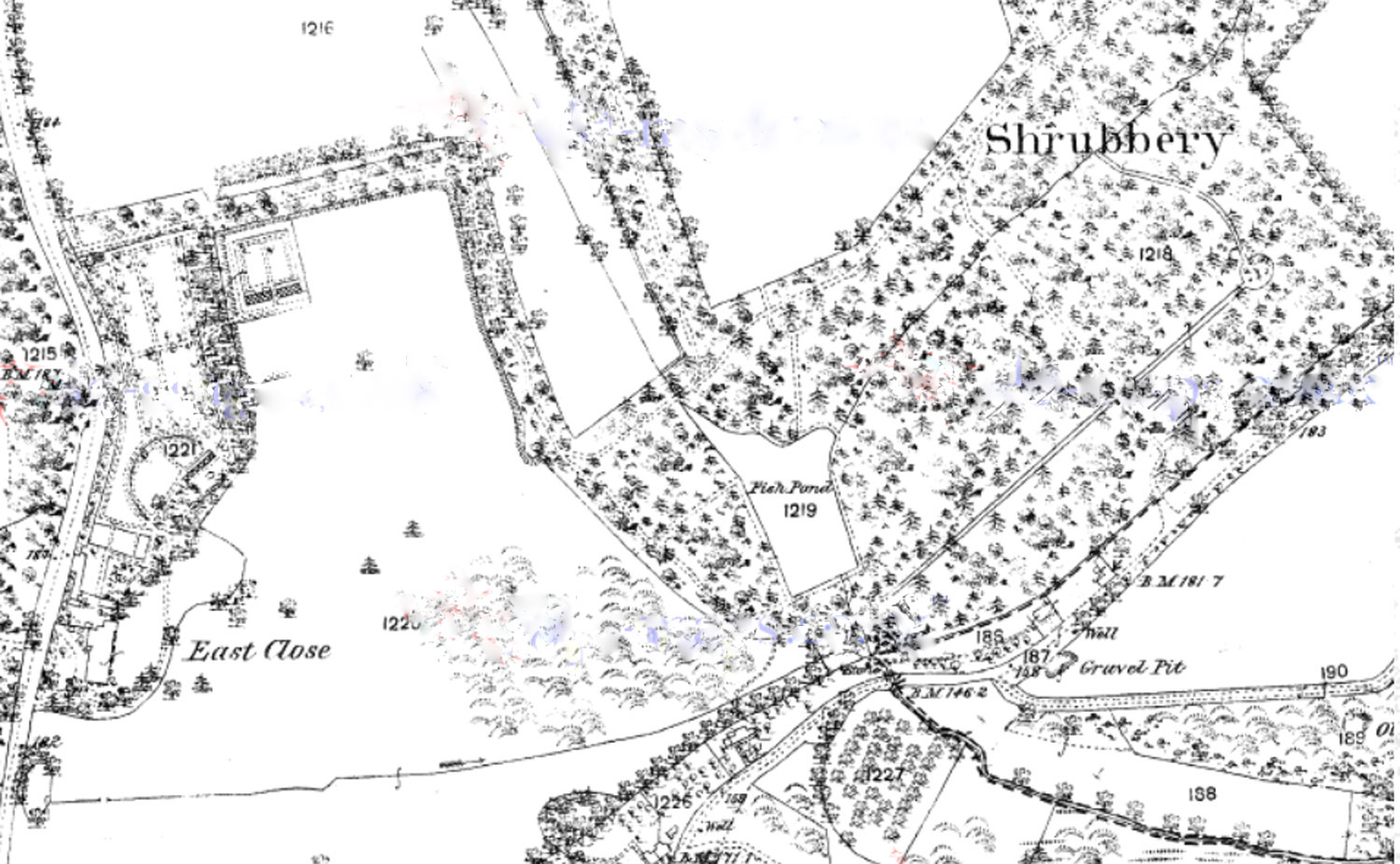
Map of East Close 1872 showing garden walls.

George William Tapps, 2nd Baronet bought the property in 1835. His father, Sir George Ivison Tapps, 1st Baronet, already owned nearby Hinton Admiral House and had been tenant of East Close Farm since 1815. When his father died in 1835 George William inherited this house and added East Close to his estate. At this time he also changed his name to Tapps-Gervis in keeping with this father's will.

George William Tapps was born in 1795. He was educated to be a lawyer but he did not practise. Instead he became a Member of Parliament in 1826. He is also credited with having a large input into the development of Bournemouth. In 1825 he married Clara Fuller but unfortunately she died only six years later at the age of 29. The couple had four children.

When George purchased East Close he was aged 39 and a widower. He also died at a young age being only 47 and leaving four young children. The eldest son George Elliott Tapps-Gervis, 3rd Baronet was only 15 when he inherited his father's estate in 1842.

Sir George Elliott Tapps-Gervis was born in 1827 in Dover. In 1849 he married Fanny Harland who was the daughter of Christopher Harland of Ashbourne, Derbyshire. The couple had four children.

George became the owner of a very large number of properties. Besides Hinton Admiral and East Close he also owned Bodorgan Hall, Anglesey and was said to be landlord of almost the whole of Bournemouth. In 1876 he assumed the name of Meyrick. He died in 1896 and left his estate to his eldest son.

East Close remains within the Meyrick Estates, and has been leased by many notable people. For example, Baroness Frances Louisa Somerville leased the property for about twenty years after her husband Kenelm Somerville, 17th Lord Somerville died in 1864. A painting of the rear of East Close House in 1868 is included in an album of watercolours by their daughter, Julia F. Somerville.

== Mrs. Lister-Kay & Poultry Breeding ==
By the early 1890s, the property was associated with former New York poultry breeder Mrs. Lister Kay, who was noted for her Buff Leghorns. Mrs. Kay designed her own field pens, situated amidst the property's broad lawn and gardens.
