= Hinton (place name) =

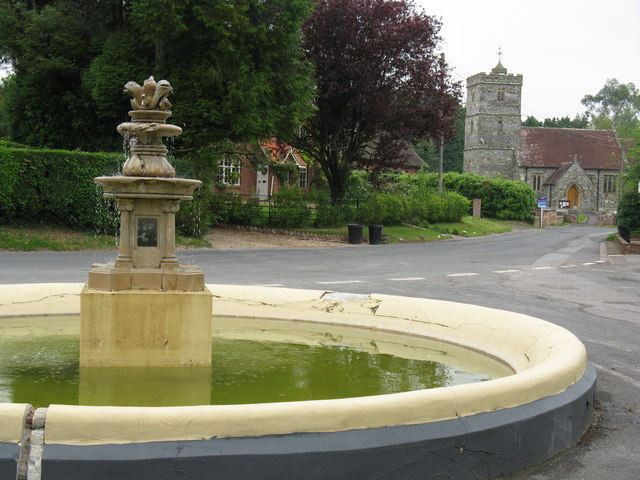
Hinton Martell The former monastery of Wimbourne held land here.

Hinton is a place name of Old English origin, and is a common English village name, particularly in Southern England. Village names often include a suffix, for example Hinton on the Green and Hinton-in-the-Hedges.

The place-name is closely related to other place-names that may derive from Old English hēah (or hēa, hēan), meaning "high" or "tall", such as Highham, Heaton, and Hampton.

== Etymology ==
The place name Hinton is of Old English origin, and usually derives from either:

1. Old English hiwan (or higna, hina), meaning "members of a family, household or religious house", or "farm of the monks or of the nuns".
2. Old English hēah (or hēan), meaning "high, tall" or "exalted, important".

The suffix is from Old English tūn, meaning "an enclosed piece of ground" or "a village or town".

== Examples ==
=== List of examples ===
Sortable list of examples:

Place name	County	Location	Domesday entry	Etymology	Notes
Hinton on the Green	Worcestershire	52.06°N 1.96°W	Hinetune. St. Peter's Abbey	higna. ("monastery")	In 981 Elfleda granted the manor to St. Peter's Abbey.
Hinton-in-the-Hedges	Northamptonshire	52.025°N 1.189°W	Hintone. Geoffrey de Mandeville	See below.	There is no known record of monastic settlement.
Hinton Blewett	Somerset	51.309°N 2.583°W	Hantone. William of Eu	hēan. ("high")	
Hinton St Mary	Dorset	50.944°N 2.306°W	Haintone. Shaftesbury Abbey	hēan. ("high")	The village occupies a hill overlooking the River Stour.
Hinton St George	Somerset	50.909°N 2.819°W	Hantone. William of Eu	hēan. ("high")	
Hinton Martell	Dorset	50.854°N 1.983°W	Hinetone. Gilbert de Magminot	higna. ("monastery")	Former monastery of Wimbourne Minster held land here.

=== Hinton-in-the-Hedges ===
The name was previously recorded as Hynton in the edge (1549). The toponym might be: "Village in the hill-side".

The etymology is uncertain. The etymologist Victor Watts proposed that the name derives from Old English hina, which is normally used in the context of a monastery or other community. However, there is no known record of a monastic settlement.

Another possibility is that the name derives from Old English hēah ("high). The name element edge refers to a hill-side or escarpment (also found in nearby Edge Hill and Edgcote) – the village is on the rim of a plateau used by the Hinton-in-the-Hedges Airfield. The Holy Trinity Church is 128m above sea level, while the church at nearby Westbury is only 103m above sea level.

== List of place-names in England ==
Sortable list of Hinton place-names:

Place-name	Post town	County	Latitude N – S	Points of interest
Hinton – near Pontesbury	Shrewsbury	Shropshire	308100	Pontesbury Hill Iron Age hill-fort.
Hinton – near Stottesdon	Kidderminster	Shropshire	282500	
Hinton – near Blythburgh	Halesworth	Suffolk	275350	Blythburgh Priory
Cherry Hinton	Cambridge	Cambridgeshire	256349	Iron Age hill-fort.
Hinton	Daventry	Northamptonshire	252527	
Hinton on the Green (See example).	Evesham	Worcestershire	240250	
Hinton – near Peterchurch	Hereford	Herefordshire	238800	Golden Valley
Hinton-in-the-Hedges (See example).	Brackley	Northamptonshire	237000	
Hinton – near Stroud.	Berkeley	Gloucestershire	203993	River Severn
Hinton Waldrist	Faringdon	Oxfordshire	199106	
Hinton Parva (Little Hinton)	Swindon	Wiltshire	183229	Old Minster, Winchester
Hinton – near Bristol.	Bristol	Gloucestershire	176820	Hinton Hill – Battle of Deorham.
Broad Hinton	Swindon	Wiltshire	176515	Bincknoll Castle Iron Age hill-fort.
Great Hinton	Trowbridge	Wiltshire	159054	
Hinton Charterhouse	Bath	Somerset	158606	Hinton Priory
Hinton Blewett (See example).	Bristol	Somerset	156800	
Hinton Ampner	Winchester	Hampshire	127549	
Hinton St Mary (See example).	Sturminster Newton	Dorset	116212	Shaftesbury Abbey
Hinton Daubney	Waterlooville	Hampshire	114121	
Hinton St George (See example).	Hinton St George	Somerset	112600	Hinton House
Tarrant Hinton	Blandford Forum	Dorset	111101	Shaftesbury Abbey
Hinton Martell (See example).	Wimborne Minster	Dorset	106100	
Hinton Parva (Little Hinton)	Wimborne Minster	Dorset	104448	
Hinton	Christchurch, Dorset	Hampshire	095985	New Forest
Hinton Admiral	Christchurch, Dorset	Hampshire	094877	

== See also ==
- Hinton (name)
