= Hinton station =

Hinton station may refer to:

- Hinton railway station (England), a former station in Hinton-on-the-Green, Worcestershire
- Hinton station (Alberta), a Canadian National Railway station in Hinton, Alberta
- Hinton station (West Virginia), an Amtrak station in Hinton, West Virginia

== See also ==
- Hinton (disambiguation)
- Hinton Admiral railway station
