= Tapps-Gervis-Meyrick baronets =

Title in the Baronetage of Great Britain

Escutcheon of the Tapps baronets of Hinton Admiral

The Tapps, later Tapps-Gervis, later Tapps-Gervis-Meyrick baronetcy, of Hinton Admiral in the County of Hampshire, is a title in the Baronetage of Great Britain. It was created on 28 July 1791 for the landowner and developer George Tapps.

The 2nd Baronet sat as Member of Parliament for New Romney, from 1826 to 1830, and for Christchurch 1832 to 1833. He assumed in 1835 the additional surname of Gervis. The 3rd Baronet was High Sheriff of Anglesey in 1878. He assumed in 1876 by Royal licence the additional surname of Meyrick according to the will of Owen Fuller Meyrick, from whom he inherited the Bodorgan estate on Anglesey.

The 4th Baronet was High Sheriff of Hampshire in 1900. The 5th Baronet was High Sheriff of Anglesey in 1939.

The family seats were Bodorgan Hall, Anglesey, and Hinton Admiral, near Bransgore, Hampshire.

The Tapps Coat of Arms: Azure on a fess or between three rhinoceroses argent three escallops gules.

== Tapps, later Tapps-Gervis, later Tapps-Gervis-Meyrick baronets of Hinton Admiral (1791) ==
- Sir George Ivison Tapps, 1st Baronet (1753–1835)
- Sir George William Tapps-Gervis, 2nd Baronet (1795–1842)
- Sir George Eliott Meyrick Tapps-Gervis-Meyrick, 3rd Baronet (1827–1896)
- Sir George Augustus Eliott Tapps-Gervis-Meyrick, 4th Baronet (1855–1928)
- Sir George Llewelyn Tapps-Gervis-Meyrick, 5th Baronet (1885–1960)
- Sir George David Eliott Tapps-Gervis-Meyrick, 6th Baronet (1915–1988)
- Sir George Christopher Cadfael Tapps-Gervis-Meyrick, 7th Baronet (1941–2019) He married 1968, Jean Louise Montagu Douglas Scott (born 1943), niece of HRH Princess Alice, Duchess of Gloucester
- Sir George William Owen Tapps-Gervis-Meyrick, 8th Baronet (born 1970)

The heir apparent is the present holder's son George Augustus Heilyn Tapps-Gervis-Meyrick (born 2011).

== Sources ==
- Kidd, Charles, ed. (1903). Debrett's peerage, baronetage, knightage, and companionage. London: Dean and son. p. 414.
- "No. 13318". The London Gazette. 18 June 1791. p. 363.

=== References ===
Baronetage of Great Britain
Preceded by Hudson baronets	Tapps baronets of Hinton Admiral; 28 July 1791	Succeeded by Chad baronets
