= Hinton Skydiving Centre =

Parachuting centre in England

Skydive Hinton
- Location within England
- Headquarters: Hinton-in-the-Hedges Airfield
- Coordinates: 52°1′48″N 1°12′37″W
- Website: https://skydive.co.uk/

Hinton Skydiving Centre is a BPA affiliated parachuting centre and skydiving drop zone at the Hinton-in-the-Hedges Airfield, on the west side of Hinton-in-the-Hedges, Northamptonshire, England.

The centre operates a PAC 750XL. It provides student training in Accelerated Freefall, as well as Tandem skydiving. The drop zone has a kit store onsite.
