= St Kenelm's Church =

St Kenelm's Church may refer to:

- St Kenelm's Church, Sapperton, Gloucestershire
- St Kenelm's Church, Stanbridge, Dorset

== See also ==
- Saint Kenelm#Churches
