= 2023 Bournemouth beach incident =

Incident in Bournemouth, UK

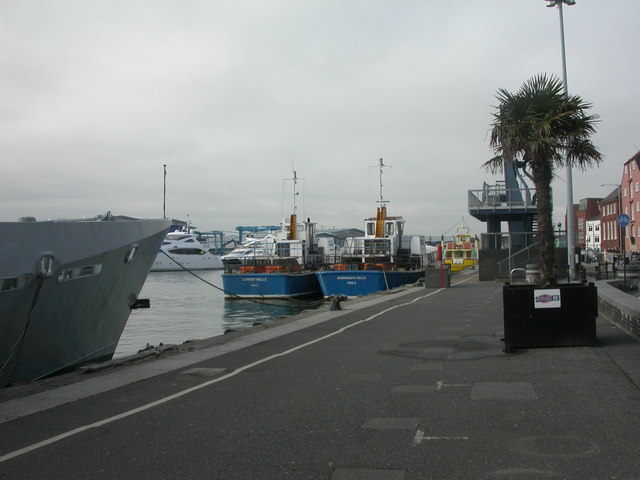
- The Dorset Belle (left) and the Bournemouth Belle (right) moored in 2009
- Date: 31 May 2023
- Location: Bournemouth, England; 50.716132°N 1.875442°W
- Deaths: 2
- Injuries: 8

On 31 May 2023, two people died and eight others were injured on the beach in Bournemouth, Dorset, England. A man was arrested on suspicion of manslaughter, but following an investigation, police determined that no criminal offence had been committed in relation to the incident.

== Background ==
Bournemouth is one of the most popular beaches in the United Kingdom. On 25 June 2020 during COVID-19 lockdown, a major incident was declared after half a million people descended on the beach. In 2021, it was ranked the 5th best in Europe and among the top 25 in the world.

== Incident ==
At 4.07pm on 31 May 2023, emergency services were called to Bournemouth beach. 10 people were rescued from the water. Onlookers gave CPR to the victims. A 17-year-old-boy from Southampton and a 12 year-girl from High Wycombe were pronounced dead at hospital. The boy was transported to the Royal Bournemouth Hospital and the girl was taken to Poole Hospital.

The victims were not related. Reports were made of a "rip tide". Witnesses were urged not to share graphic footage of the incident online. This was after reports of TikToks being filmed near the scene. The day following the beach continued to be packed full.

Dorset Police said that no physical contact was made between the swimmers and any vessel or jet-ski and those involved had not been jumping off the pier. Assistant Chief Constable Rachel Farrell thanked members of the public who helped people in trouble in the water.

It was described as "one of the worst British seaside incidents in recent history". The victims were named on 4 June.

== Dorset Belle pleasure boat ==
The pleasure boat the Dorset Belle was later impounded at Cobb's Quay in Poole Harbour. The boat was put under police cordon. The boat had reportedly not been on the water all week due to bad weather. The vessel is a passenger boat built in Poole by J. Bolson in 1974. Operations moved to Cardiff Bay in 2002, before returning to serve Bournemouth Pier in 2021. It was the first purpose built steel passenger boat to operate locally. The Dorset Police said the impounding was "just one of several lines of inquiry. On 23 June, the boat operator permanently ceased operations. On 28 June it was reported that the boat had been sold.

== Investigation ==
A man in his 40s, who Dorset police said "was on the water" at the time of the incident, was arrested on suspicion of manslaughter and later released under investigation. The incident is being investigated by Dorset Police's Maritime Accident Investigation Branch and the Maritime and Coastguard Agency. On 2 June it was revealed that the Dorset Belle had returned to Bournemouth Pier at 4.40pm and 5.03pm.

On 5 June 2023, an inquest at Dorset Coroner's Court was told there was a "suggestion" that a riptide may have led to the drownings. Dorset Police said it was keeping an "open mind" about the circumstances that led to the deaths.

On 6 June 2023, all boat operations to and from Bournemouth Pier were suspended pending the conclusion of the police investigation. Dorset Police and Crime Commissioner David Sidwick defended the work of his force investigating the “complex” incident.

On 27 June 2023, investigators said that no boat was involved in the incident. The Marine Accident Investigation Board (MAIB) said it would now not be pursuing any further inquiries.

On 14 July, Dorset Police announced that no criminal offences had been committed in relation to the incident.

In 2024, an inquest into the two deaths ruled them as accidental, and indicated that they had been caused by a rip tide. The coroner stated she was satisfied that no further measures would have prevented the deaths following an "unexpected anomaly of nature," and praised the actions of lifeguards.

== Reactions ==
Tobias Ellwood, the Conservative MP for Bournemouth East, called on Dorset Police to give out more information for clarity. Vikki Slade, the Liberal Democrat Leader of Bournemouth, Christchurch and Poole Council who had been elected on 24 May 2023, said she would be discussing safety at the pier with Bournemouth West MP Conor Burns on 2 June. Bournemouth, Christchurch and Poole Council will be assessing safety in the water near the pier.

== Aftermath ==
In September 2023, an art installation for the Bournemouth Arts by the Sea Festival was put up consisting of a 15 metre high illuminated archway. It was created by the organisation Lucid Creates. It was controversial due to the proximity to the beach. It was removed after the victims families raised a complaint with BCP Council.

As a result of the incident pleasure boats will not return to the pier for 2025. Council leader Millie Earl announced that restoration works for Bournemouth Pier would be completed for 2026.
