= Hinton Parva =

Hamlet in Dorset, England

Coordinates: 50.839°N 2.003°W

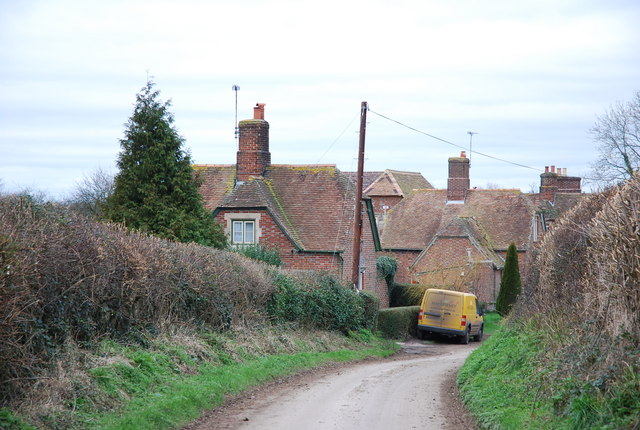
- Hinton Parva

- Location within Dorset
- Population: 56 (2001 Census)
- OS grid reference: ST998044
- Civil parish: Hinton
- Unitary authority: Dorset
- Ceremonial county: Dorset
- Region: South West
- Country: England
- Sovereign state: United Kingdom
- Post town: WIMBORNE
- Postcode district: BH21
- Dialling code: 01202
- Police: Dorset
- Fire: Dorset and Wiltshire
- Ambulance: South Western
- UK Parliament: North Dorset
- Website: valeofallen-pc.gov.uk

Hinton Parva is a hamlet and former civil parish, now in the civil parish of Hinton, in east Dorset, England, three miles north of Wimborne Minster. The parish had a population of 56 in 2001 and included the nearby village of Stanbridge. The civil parish was abolished on 1 April 2015 and merged with Hinton Martell to form Hinton parish.

The first tier of local government is Vale of Allen Parish Council, which covers four neighbouring parishes as well as Hinton.

== See also ==
- Hinton (place name)
