= Hinton Admiral railway station =

Railway station in Hampshire, England

Coordinates: 50.753°N 1.714°W

Hinton Admiral
- The station in November 2026, looking in the direction of London.

General information
- Location: Hinton Admiral, District of New Forest; England
- Grid reference: SZ202948
- Manager: South Western Railway
- Platforms: 2

Other information
- Station code: HNA
- Classification: DfT category E

History
- Original company: Bournemouth Direct Railway
- Pre-grouping: London and South Western Railway
- Post-grouping: Southern Railway

Key dates
- 6 March 1888: Opened as Hinton
- 1 May 1888: Renamed Hinton Admiral for Highcliffe-on-Sea
- ?: Renamed Hinton Admiral

Passengers
- 2020/21: ▼31,448
- 2021/22: ▲91,230
- 2022/23: ▲0.115 million
- 2023/24: ▲0.125 million
- 2024/25: ▲0.134 million
Location
Notes
- Passenger statistics from the Office of Rail and Road

Hinton Admiral railway station is a station serving the villages of Bransgore and Hinton and the seaside town of Highcliffe on the Hampshire/Dorset border in southern England. It is 101 miles 5 chains (162.6 km) down the line from London Waterloo.

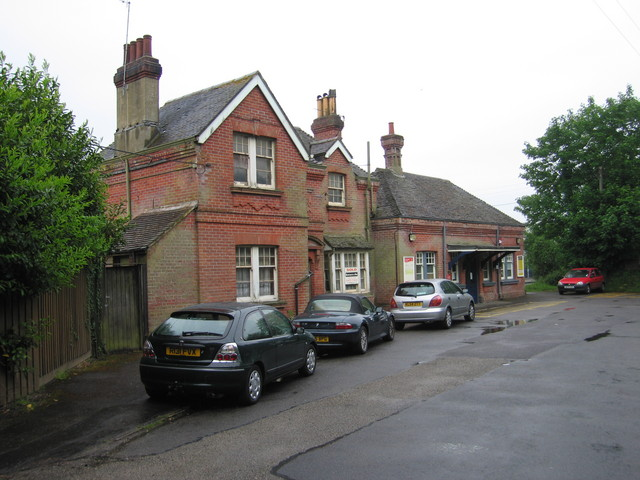
This building has a plaque on the wall indicating a construction date of 1886. The station has a small car park.

The station is on the stretch of line opened in 1888 between Brockenhurst and Christchurch to provide a direct line from London to Bournemouth, bypassing the original "Castleman's Corkscrew" line via Ringwood and reducing that line to a backwater.

There is no village as such named Hinton Admiral. The station was originally named Hinton after the nearby village, but shortly after being opened was renamed Hinton Admiral to share its name with Hinton Admiral House, the residence of Sir George Tapps-Gervis-Meyrick who owned the land on which the station was built.

The station was host to a Southern Railway camping coach from 1938 to 1939. A camping coach was also positioned here by the Southern Region from 1954 to 1960, the coach was replaced from 1961 to 1965 by a Pullman camping coach.

== Services ==
The station and all passenger train services calling here are operated by South Western Railway. The platforms are able to accommodate trains of up to five coaches on the 444 Stock or six coaches on the 450 Stock.

As of February 2022, the following services call here in both directions:

- Monday - Friday
  - peak hours: 2 trains per hour on Poole - London Waterloo service, which some of them join / split at Southampton Central with a fast train for Weymouth
  - off-peak: 1 train per hour on Bournemouth - Winchester stopping service
- Saturday
  - 1 train per hour on Poole - Winchester stopping service
- Sunday
  - 1 train per hour on Poole - London Waterloo stopping service

Preceding station	National Rail	Following station
New Milton	South Western Railway; London Waterloo - Weymouth	Christchurch
