= George Tapps-Gervis-Meyrick =

Sir George Eliott Meyrick Tapps-Gervis-Meyrick, 3rd Baronet (1 September 1827 – 7 March 1896) was a land owner and developer, and served as High Sheriff of Anglesey in 1878.

Sir George was born in Dover whilst his father was member of parliament for New Romney. He inherited his father's estate at age 15 and was later educated at Christ Church, Oxford from 1846 to 1849.

The third baronet adopted the name Meyrick in 1876 in compliance with the will of Owen Fuller Meyrick, a relative of his mother, from whom he inherited the 17,000-acre (69 km^{2}) estate of Bodorgan, Anglesey.

Sir George played an important role in the growth of Bournemouth: He was one of the sponsors of the Bournemouth Improvement Act 1856, which established an improvement commission, the town's first local government authority. As lord of the manor he had a permanent place on the board of commissioners, though he rarely attended.

Sir George was closely associated with the building of Bournemouth's pier in 1861. He was initially opposed to the building the railway to Bournemouth, as the direct line would intrude through his holdings at Hinton Admiral. However, he was persuaded to change his mind by Sir Merton Russell Cotes, who acted as a go-between for those at Hinton Admiral and the local tradesmen of Bournemouth, in view of the benefits to the resort from the drastic cut in travelling time to London.

Under the terms of the Christchurch Inclosures Act 1802, certain areas of Bournemouth had been set aside as commons under the trusteeship of the lord of the manor. The transformation of these commons into local authority parks was a contentious local issue that soured relations between Sir George and the townsfolk. Bournemouth's incorporation as a borough in 1890 settled the matter in the townsfolk's favour. After which Sir George co-operated fully, and the first of the new parks, opened in 1894, was named Meyrick Park in his honour.

Baronetage of Great Britain
Preceded by George William Tapps-Gervis	Baronet (of Hinton Admiral); 1842–1896	Succeeded by George Augustus Eliott Tapps-Gervis-Meyrick
