= Beckley, Hampshire =

Hamlet in Hampshire, England

Coordinates: 50.765°N 01.689°W

Beckley
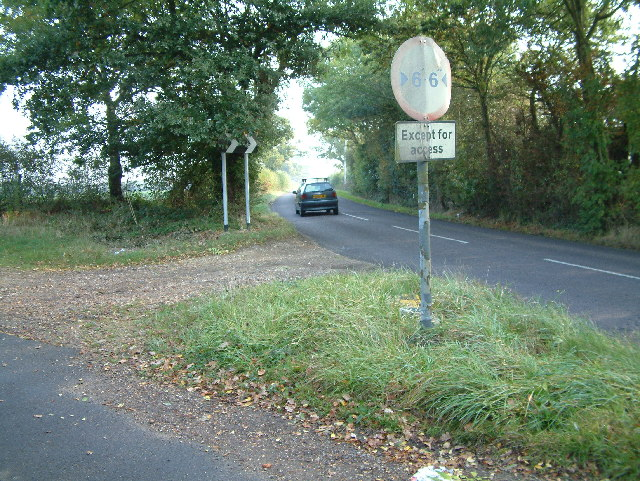
- Road Junction at Beckley

- Location within Hampshire
- OS grid reference: SZ221963
- Civil parish: Bransgore
- District: New Forest
- Shire county: Hampshire
- Region: South East
- Country: England
- Sovereign state: United Kingdom
- Post town: Christchurch
- Postcode district: BH23
- Dialling code: 01425
- Police: Hampshire and Isle of Wight
- Fire: Hampshire and Isle of Wight
- Ambulance: South Central
- UK Parliament: New Forest West

Beckley is a hamlet in Hampshire, England. It lies in the civil parish of Bransgore.

Beckley is mentioned in the Domesday Book of 1086, when it was held by "Nigel the doctor" from Earl Roger of Shrewsbury. Before 1066 it was held by Holmger. The manor was known as Bichelei in 1086, and Beckele in 1294. The name means Beocca's or Bicca's clearing, and may be related to the Domesday manor of Becton found to the east of Barton on Sea. Today Beckley is still a small settlement clustered around Beckley Farm.
