= Hinton, Dorset =

Civil parish in Dorset, England

Coordinates: 50.847°N 1.993°W

Hinton
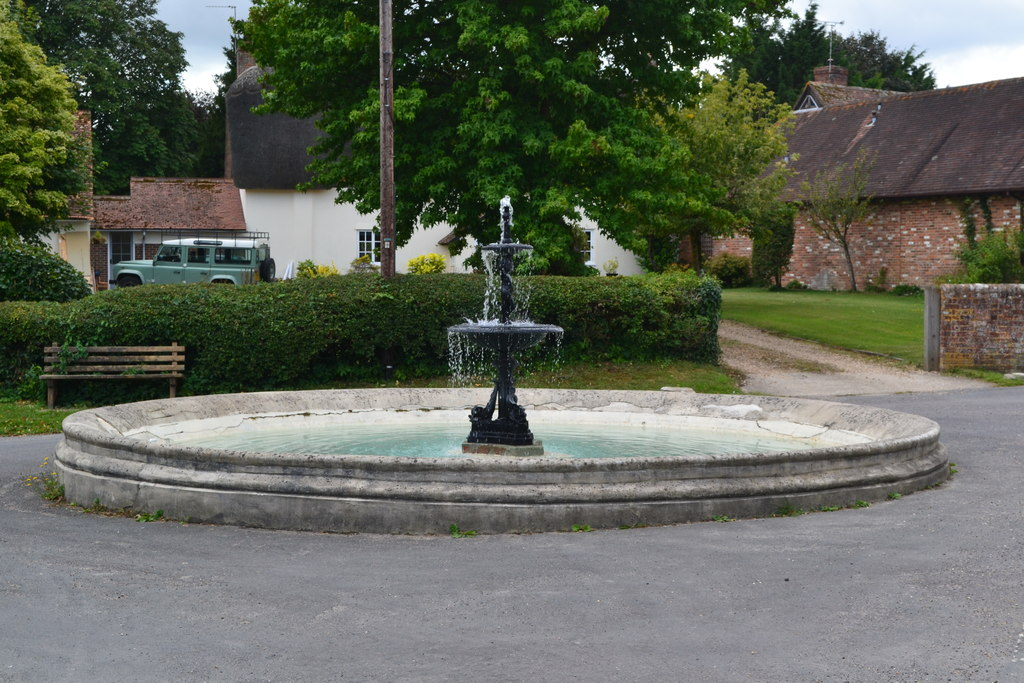
- Fountain at Hinton Martell

- Location within Dorset
- Population: 411 (2021 Census)
- Civil parish: Hinton
- Unitary authority: Dorset
- Ceremonial county: Dorset
- Region: South West
- Country: England
- Sovereign state: United Kingdom
- Police: Dorset
- Fire: Dorset and Wiltshire
- Ambulance: South Western
- UK Parliament: North Dorset

Hinton is a civil parish in Dorset, England, situated 3 miles north of Wimborne Minster. It was created on 1 April 2015 from Hinton Martell and Hinton Parva.

== Demographics ==
In the 2021 United Kingdom census, the population of Hinton was 411 people.

== Settlements ==
Hinton parish covers a number of villages:

- Hinton Martell
- Hinton Parva
- Stanbridge
- Uppington

== Politics ==
For UK general elections, Hinton is part of the North Dorset constituency.

Locally, Hinton is part of the Stour and Allen Vale ward for elections to Dorset Council.

== See also ==
- List of civil parishes in Dorset
