= Hinton, South Gloucestershire =

Coordinates: 51°29′20″N 2°23′10″W

Hinton
- Village
- Country: England
- Sovereign state: United Kingdom

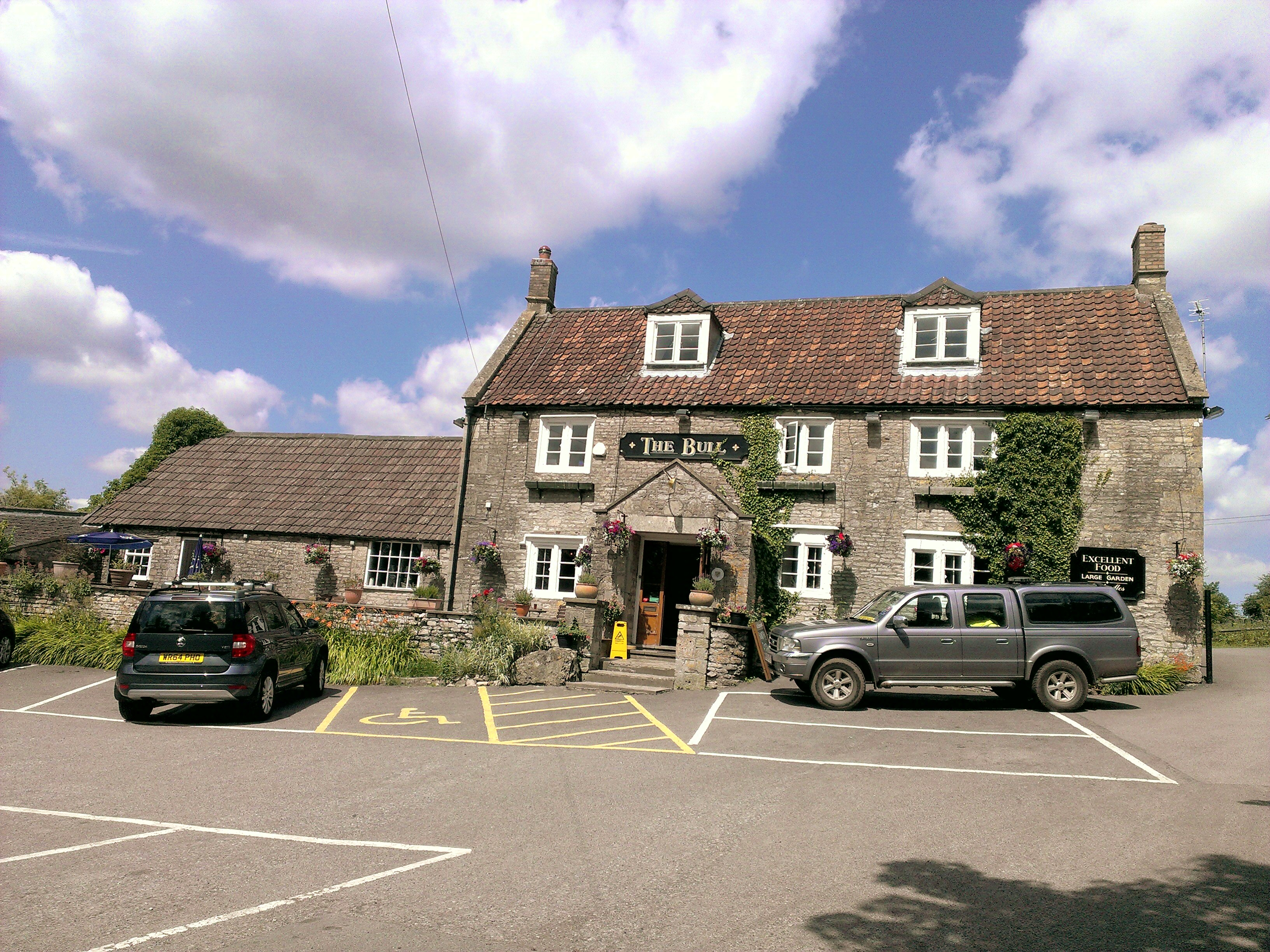
The Bull Inn

Hinton is a village in South Gloucestershire, England. It is one mile north of Dyrham and forms part of the civil parish of Dyrham and Hinton. The Bull is the local pub.

== Battle of Deorham ==
The Battle of Deorham (577 C.E.) was fought between West Saxons and Britons on Hinton Hill to the east of the village. It was a key moment in the isolation (on land, at least) of the Britons of the South West Peninsula from the Britons of what would become Wales.

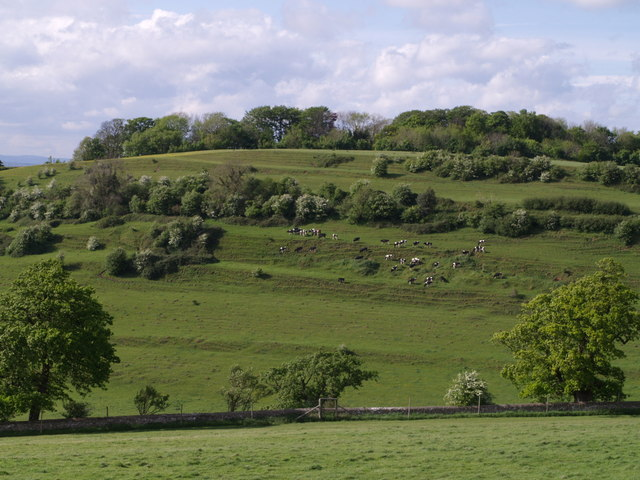
Hinton Hill, scene of the battle, from the south

== See also ==
- Hinton (place name)
