= Hinton, Hampshire =

Village in Hampshire, England

Coordinates: 50.7625°N 01.7005°W

Hinton
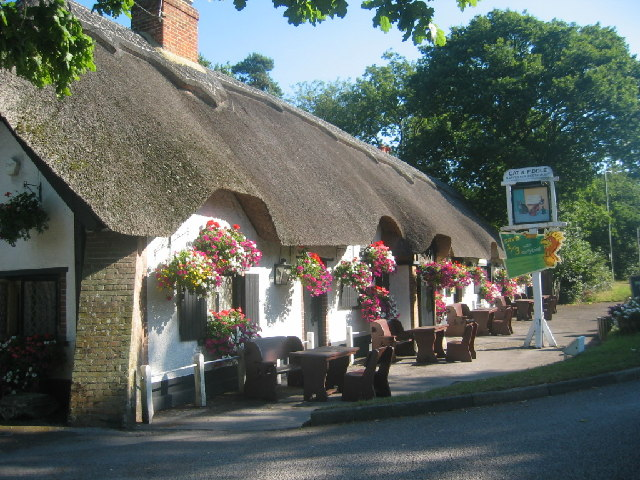
- Cat and Fiddle inn at Hinton

- Location within Hampshire
- OS grid reference: SZ212958
- Civil parish: Bransgore
- District: New Forest
- Shire county: Hampshire
- Region: South East
- Country: England
- Sovereign state: United Kingdom
- Post town: Christchurch
- Postcode district: BH23
- Dialling code: 01425
- Police: Hampshire and Isle of Wight
- Fire: Hampshire and Isle of Wight
- Ambulance: South Central
- UK Parliament: New Forest West

Hinton is a dispersed settlement in the civil parish of Bransgore, in the English county of Hampshire.

Hinton is centred on the main A35 road northeast of Christchurch and gives its name to both Hinton House and Hinton Admiral. For local government purposes it is in the civil parish of Bransgore and the district of New Forest.

It is served by the main-line Hinton Admiral railway station.

East Close House is a house of historical significance and is a grade II listed building. The village was the seat of the 18th century Stewkley Baronetcy.

== See also ==
- Hinton (place name)
