= Hinton Daubney =

Hamlet in Hampshire, England

Coordinates: 50.922°N 1.034°W

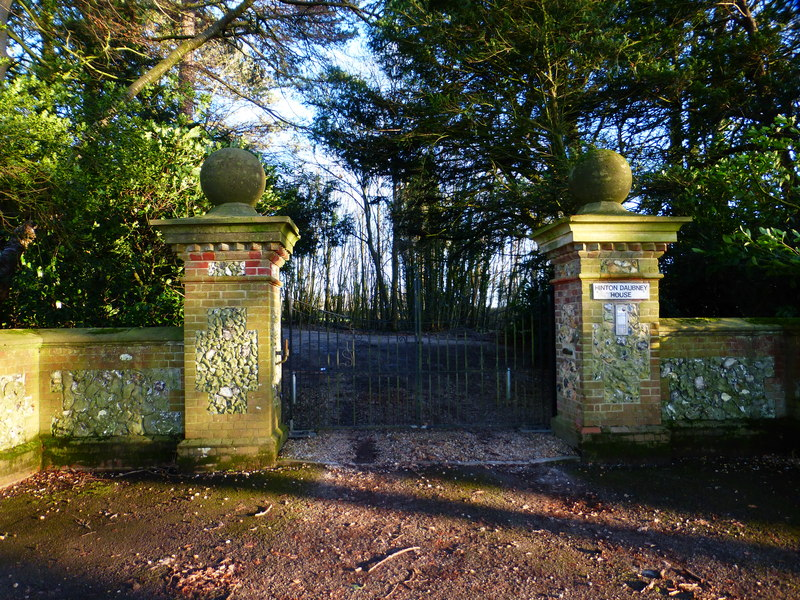
Gateway to Hinton Daubney

Hinton Daubney is a small hamlet in Hampshire, England, located between Catherington and Hambledon. It is the site of one of the earliest recorded sightings of ball lightning.

Hinton Daubney played a role in the escape of Charles II from England after the battle of Worcester. It is one of the places where he and Lord Wilmot found loyal support in the person of Lawrence Hyde. See _Last Act_, by George Gounter, published by J. R. Smith, 1873, available at archive.org, document ID lastactinmiracul00goun.

== See also ==
- Hinton (place name)
