= Holdenhurst Road drill hall, Bournemouth =

Military building in Bournemouth, England

Holdenhurst Road drill hall
- Bournemouth
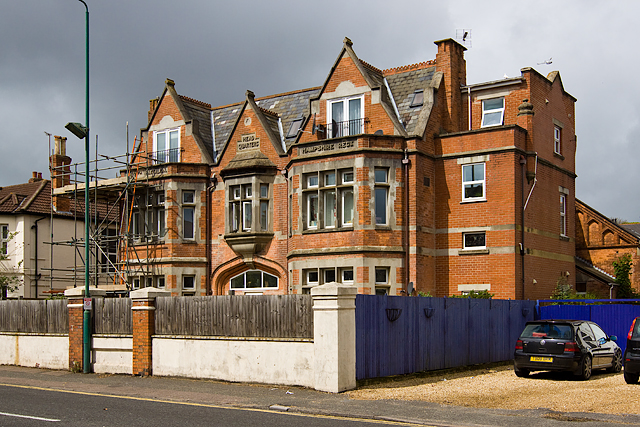
- Holdenhurst Road drill hall

Site information
- Type: Drill hall

Location
- Location in Dorset
- Coordinates: 50.72799°N 1.86039°W

Site history
- Built: 1897
- Built for: War Office
- In use: 1897–2006

The Holdenhurst Road drill hall is a former military installation in Bournemouth, Dorset.

== History ==
The building was designed as the headquarters of the 4th Volunteer Battalion, The Hampshire Regiment and was completed in 1897. This unit evolved to become the 7th Battalion, The Hampshire Regiment in 1908. The battalion was mobilised at the drill hall in August 1914 before being deployed to India. The battalion amalgamated with 5th Battalion to form 5th/7th Battalion, The Hampshire Regiment at Southampton in 1921. After briefly serving as the headquarters of the 5th/7th Battalion, The Hampshire Regiment, the drill hall was used as a headquarters for the Local Defence Volunteers during the Second World War. It was subsequently decommissioned and converted for residential use in 2006.
