= Hinton-in-the-Hedges Airfield =

Airfield in Northamptonshire, England

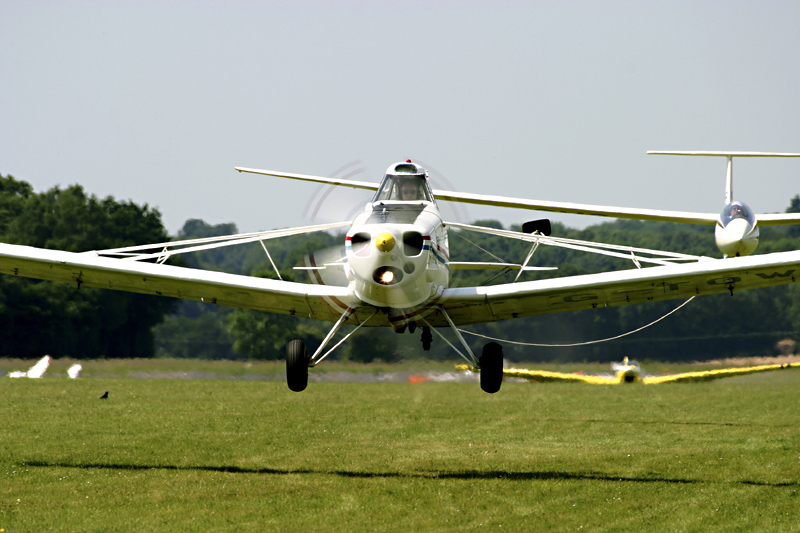
- IATA: none; ICAO: none

Summary
- Airport type: Private
- Operator: Go Fly Oxford
- Location: Brackley, Northamptonshire, England
- Elevation AMSL: 505 ft / 154 m
- Coordinates: 52°01′42″N 001°12′36″W
- Website: www.hintonairfield.co.uk

Map
- Location in Northamptonshire

Runways
Direction	Length		Surface
Direction	ft	m	Surface
06/24	2,296	700

Hinton-in-the-Hedges Airfield is an airfield on the west side of Hinton-in-the-Hedges near Brackley, Northamptonshire, England.

The airfield is made up of several runways, one of which is Asphalt and measures 700 m (2,297 ft) long. It consists of several well-drained, short-mown grass runways which are designated as 06/24, 09/27, and 15/33. The field is flat and plays home to many activities, including both powered flight and unpowered flying with gliders. The skydiving centre is open 6 days a week (closed Mondays), and skydiving takes place weather permitting.

During the British Grand Prix at nearby Silverstone, it is used as a park and ride.

== History ==
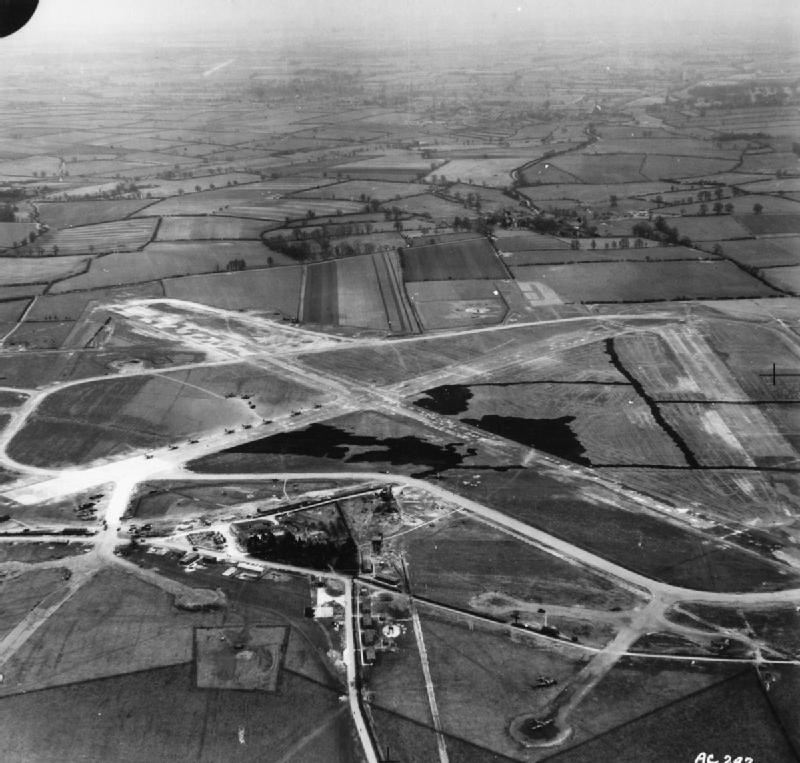
Aerial view from the west circa 1941-1942

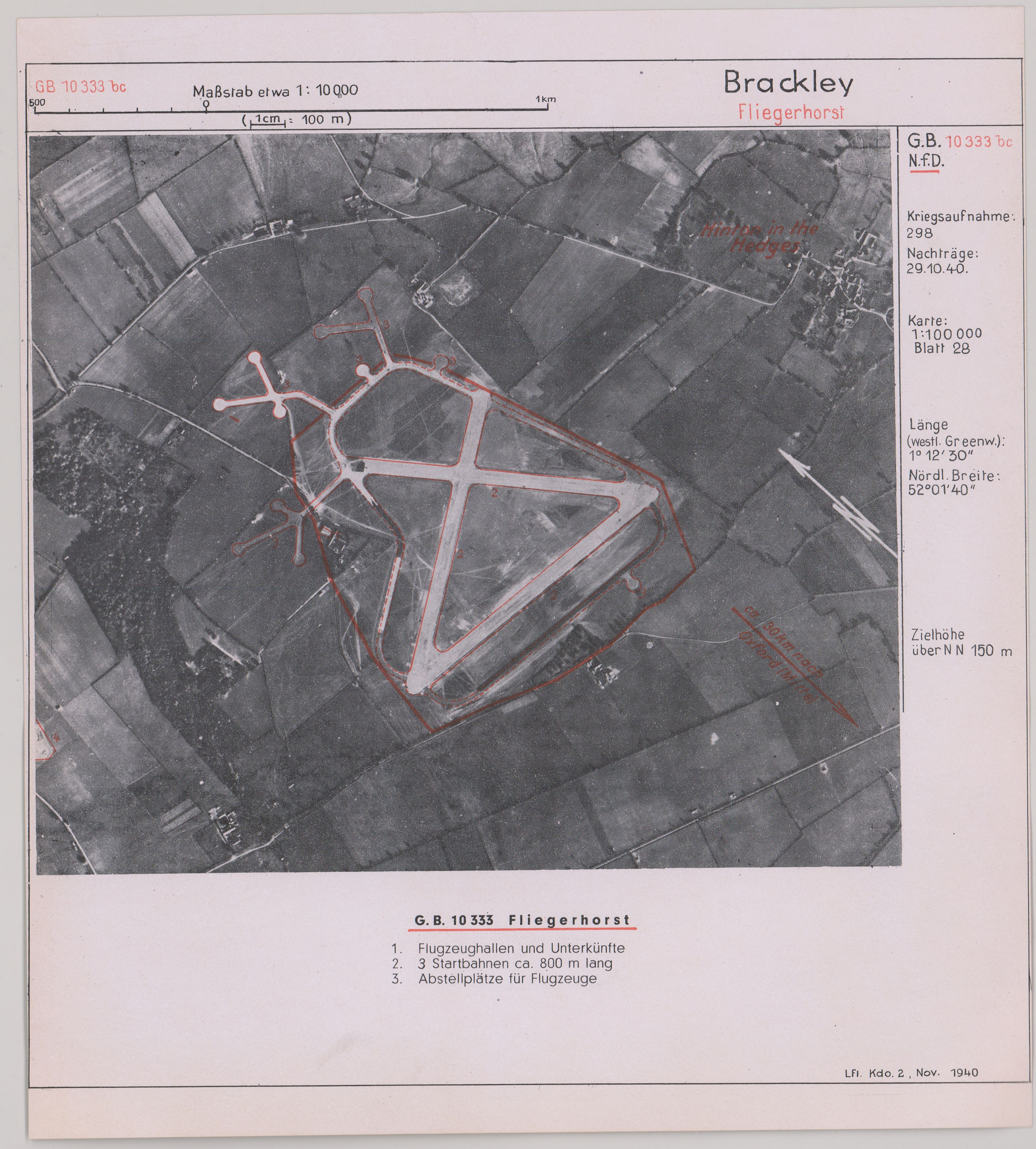
Hinton-in-the-Hedges Airfield on a target dossier of the German Luftwaffe, 1940

As with many airfields in the surrounding area, Hinton was built in 1940 by the RAF Bomber Command during the Second World War. It closed to military activity in 1945 as the war drew to a close.

The following units were here at some point:

- Relief Landing Ground of No. 13 Operational Training Unit RAF (November 1940 – August 1942)
- Satellite of No. 16 Operational Training Unit RAF (July 1942 – April 1943)
- Sub site of No. 246 Maintenance Unit RAF (November 1946 – November 1947)
- No. 1478 Flight RAF (April – June 1943)
- Beam Approach Development Unit RAF (April 1943) became 'A' Flight of the SDU.
- Ground Controlled Approach (GCA) Flight RAF (? – July 1944)
- Signals Development Unit RAF (SDU) (April 1943 – July 1944)

== Gliding ==
The gliding club at Hinton Skydiving Centre is owned by Banbury Gliding Club. It has been flying at Hinton-in-the-Hedges for over 20 years and operates mainly on weekends and Bank Holidays, but it is open some Fridays during the summer. It is situated 1.5 miles (2.4 km) from the A422 road. There is no landing fee at the airfield.

The club gliders that operate at the airfield are:

- a K13
- a K21
- a Ka6
- an Astir.

There are also many privately owned gliders, often flying cross-country, and single propeller aircraft that operate at the airfield. The K21 is used for first-time flyers and trial-lessons, the K13 is used as a trainer, and the Ka6 is used for solo pilots, as is the Astir (G-CGBJ) used for more experienced pilots. The gliding BGA turning point for the airfield is HIN.

The skydiving aircraft takes students up to about 13,000 feet (4,000 m). It takes off and lands on the main hard runway which is oriented 06/24. The club has two tug planes – a Eurofox and a Super Cub.

== Flight Training ==
Go Fly Oxford is a flying school based at the airfield and operates two Cessna 150 aircraft and a Piper PA-28RT-201 Arrow. Turweston Flying Club also operates a Piper PA28-181 Warrior from the airfield.

== Notable accidents and incidents ==
- On Thursday, 6 May 2010, the day of the UK's 2010 General Election, a PZL-104 Wilga, carrying the then former UKIP leader Nigel Farage, crashed whilst attempting to land at Hinton-in-the-Hedges Airfield after aborting a flight over Buckingham with a UKIP banner attached to the tail. The banner became tangled in the control surfaces on the aircraft's empennage, which prompted the pilot to attempt an emergency landing. The pilot and Farage were both injured and taken to different hospitals.
- In December 2010, the pilot, Justin Adams, was arrested as he was alleged to have threatened to kill Farage and similarly threatened the CAA investigator Martin James.
