= St Kenelm's Church, Stanbridge =

Church building in Dorset, England

St Kenelm's Church
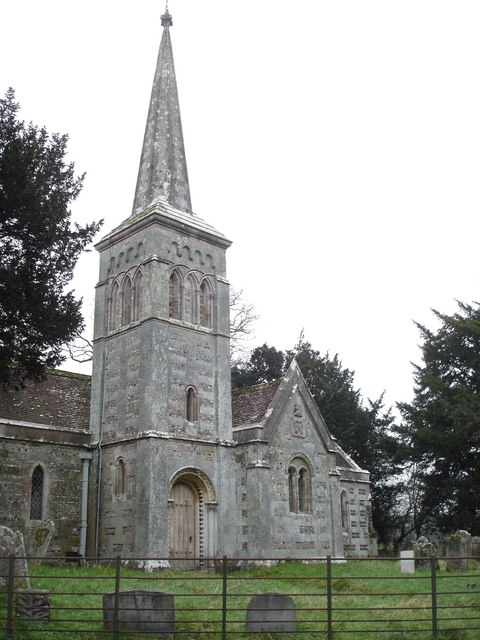
- St Kenelm's Church in 2006

Religion
- Affiliation: Anglicanism
- Ecclesiastical or organizational status: redundant

Location
- Location: Stanbridge, Dorset, England
- Interactive map of St Kenelm's Church
- Coordinates: 50.83385°N 1.99506°W

Architecture
- Type: Church
- Style: Victorian architecture
- Completed: 1860

St Kenelm's Church is a historic redundant church in the village of Stanbridge, Dorset, England. The church is dedicated to Saint Kenelm.

== History ==
The church mainly dates from 1860 but has some features from the 12th century.

The church became Grade II listed on 8 March 1955.

== See also ==
- List of churches in Dorset
