= George Tapps-Gervis =

British politician and land developer

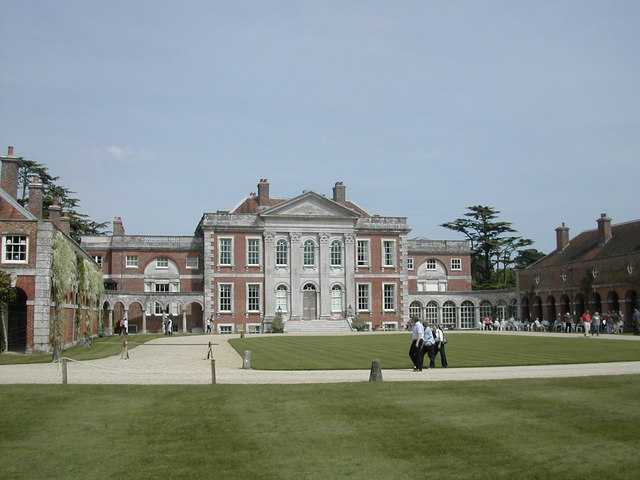
Hinton Admiral, Christchurch

Sir George William Tapps-Gervis, 2nd Baronet (24 May 1795 – 26 August 1842) was a British politician and land developer.

He was the only son of Sir George Tapps, 1st Baronet, of Hinton Admiral. After inheriting his father's estate in 1835, Tapps-Gervis commissioned Christchurch architect Benjamin Ferrey to plan and design the development of the seaside village of Bournemouth into a resort similar to those that had already grown up along the south coast such as Weymouth and Brighton.

The Westover Villas were the first development on the Gervis Estate between 1837 and 1840. They were built for families to hire during the summer and fronted on to the newly laid out Westover Gardens. The first two hotels opened in 1838. One was the Bath Hotel, which went on to become the Royal Bath, although the original building was much smaller and less grand than the current facility. The other was the Belle Vue Boarding House, which stood where the Pavilion is now and later became the Belle Vue and Pier Hotel.

Tapps-Gervis also sat as Member of Parliament for New Romney between 1826 and 1830 and for Christchurch between 1832 and 1837.

He died of apoplexy, and his death was registered 18 months later on 14 February 1844.

Parliament of the United Kingdom
Preceded by George Hay Dawkins-Pennant; Richard Edward Erle-Drax-Grosvenor	Member of Parliament for New Romney; 1826–1830; With: George Hay Dawkins-Pennant	Succeeded by Arthur Hill Trevor; William Miles
Preceded by George Henry Rose; George Pitt Rose	Member of Parliament for Christchurch; 1832–1837	Succeeded by George Henry Rose
Baronetage of Great Britain
Preceded by George Ivison Tapps	Baronet (of Hinton Admiral); 1835–1842	Succeeded by George Eliott Meyrick Tapps-Gervis-Meyrick
