= Stanbridge, Dorset =

Village in Dorset, England

Coordinates: 50°50′03″N 1°59′45″W

Stanbridge
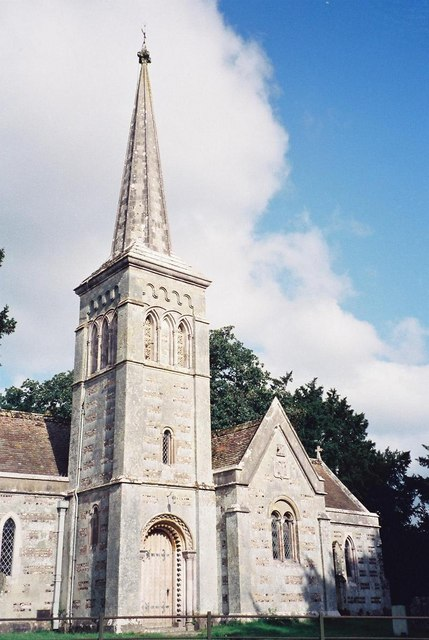
- St Kenelm's Church, Stanbridge

- Location within Dorset
- Civil parish: Hinton
- Unitary authority: Dorset
- Ceremonial county: Dorset
- Region: South West
- Country: England
- Sovereign state: United Kingdom
- Police: Dorset
- Fire: Dorset and Wiltshire
- Ambulance: South Western
- UK Parliament: North Dorset

Stanbridge is a village in the civil parish of Hinton, in Dorset, England.

== History ==
In 2022, London studio Crawshaw Architects transformed a former cow shed into Stanbridge Mill Library.

== Buildings ==
- Stanbridge House
- Stanbridge Farm Mill
- St. Kenelm's Church

== Politics ==
For UK general elections, Stanbridge is part of the North Dorset constituency.

Locally, Stanbridge is part of the Stour and Allen Vale ward for elections to Dorset Council.
