= George Tapps =

British landowner and developer

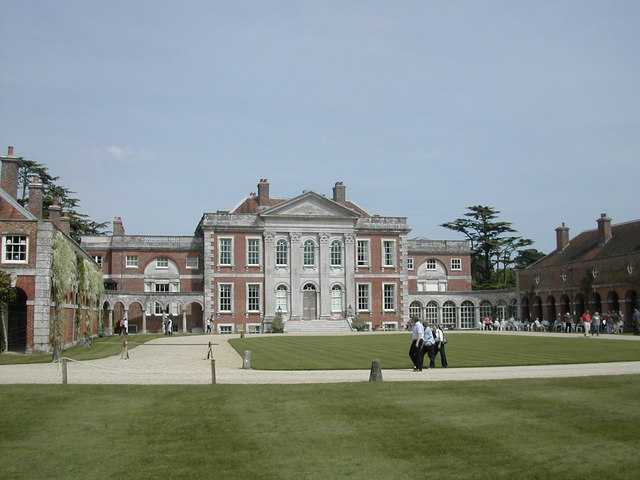
Hinton Admiral House, Christchurch

Sir George Ivison Tapps, 1st Baronet (5 January 1753 – 15 March 1835) was a British landowner and developer involved in the founding of Bournemouth.

Tapps inherited some of the estates, including Hinton Admiral, which formerly belonged to Sir Peter Mews of Hinton Admiral, from his cousin, Joseph Jarvis Clerke, when the latter died without issue in 1778. In so doing he became Lord of the manors of Hinton Admiral, Christchurch and Westover. He was also appointed High Sheriff of Hampshire in 1793.

Tapps was widely known as a "wilful and hard living confidant" of the Prince of Wales (later the Prince Regent), the future King George IV.

In the wake of the Christchurch Inclosure Act 1802 (42 Geo. 3. c. 43 Pr.), Tapps purchased 205 acres (0.83 km^{2}) in what is now the borough of Bournemouth for £1,050 (1,000 guineas). As lord of the manor he was also trustee for the areas set aside as common land, for cottage dwellers to dig for turf and suchlike. In 1809 he opened a public house called The Tapps Arms (later renamed The Tregonwell Arms). It stood where the current Post Office Road meets Old Christchurch Road, Bournemouth.

In 1810 Tapps sold 8.5 acres (34,000 m^{2}) on the west bank of the Bourne Stream to Lewis Tregonwell for £179 11s.

In 1834 Tapps obtained a loan of £40,000 from the Earl of Arran and John Augustus Fuller, into whose family his son had married, on the mortgage of the Tapps-Gervis estate at Hinton Admiral near Christchurch. With this money he intended to develop his estates on the east bank of the Bourne Stream. Building for this project finally began in 1837 under the direction of his son, as Tapps died in 1835.

Baronetage of Great Britain
New title Granted by King George III	Baronet (of Hinton Admiral); 1791–1835	Succeeded by George William Tapps-Gervis
