= Christchurch Inclosure Act 1802 =

- Act of Parliament
- Parliament of the United Kingdom
- Long title: An Act for dividing allotting and inclosing certain commonable lands and waste grounds within the parish of Christchurch and parish or chapelry of Holdenhurst in the county of Southampton.
- Citation: 42 Geo. 3. c. 43 Pr.
- Territorial extent: Christchurch, Hampshire

Dates
- Royal assent: 4 May 1802

Status: Spent

The Christchurch Inclosure Act 1802 (42 Geo. 3. c. 43 Pr.) was a private act of the Parliament of the United Kingdom for the dividing, allotting, and inclosing, certain commonable lands, and waste grounds within the parish of Christchurch and parish or chapelry of Holdenhurst, in Hampshire.

== The act ==
Bournemouth, which lay in the Liberty of West Stour, was in the late 18th century little more than overgrown heathland that separated the port of Poole from Christchurch with a few well trodden paths linking the two towns. This was one of the areas (together with lands in the manor of Hurn, and tythings of Winkton and Hinton Admiral) for which the Act authorised inclosure.

This act, along with similar acts for other parts of the country, meant that common land should be put to better agricultural use, so, the area of land that was to become Bournemouth, was divided up by three commissioners.

William Clapcott, Richard Richardson, a barrister of Lincoln's Inn Fields, and John Wickens, of Mapperton in Dorset, had the responsibility of allocating which areas should be used for roads, building materials, farming, and which areas should be given as compensation to people who, although didn't actually own the land, had a claim on it by virtue of commonable rights or tithe ownership. This task took nearly three years to complete.

The majority of this land belonged to the Lord of the manor of Christchurch, Sir George Ivison Tapps, and as compensation for his loss of interest in the soil he received from the commissioners several tracts of land totalling over 240 acres (0.97 km^{2}). James Harris, 1st Earl of Malmesbury was compensated in this manner for his loss of tithes.

== See also ==
- Inclosure act
- Westover, Hampshire
