= Hinton station (Alberta) =

Railway station in Alberta, Canada

Hinton
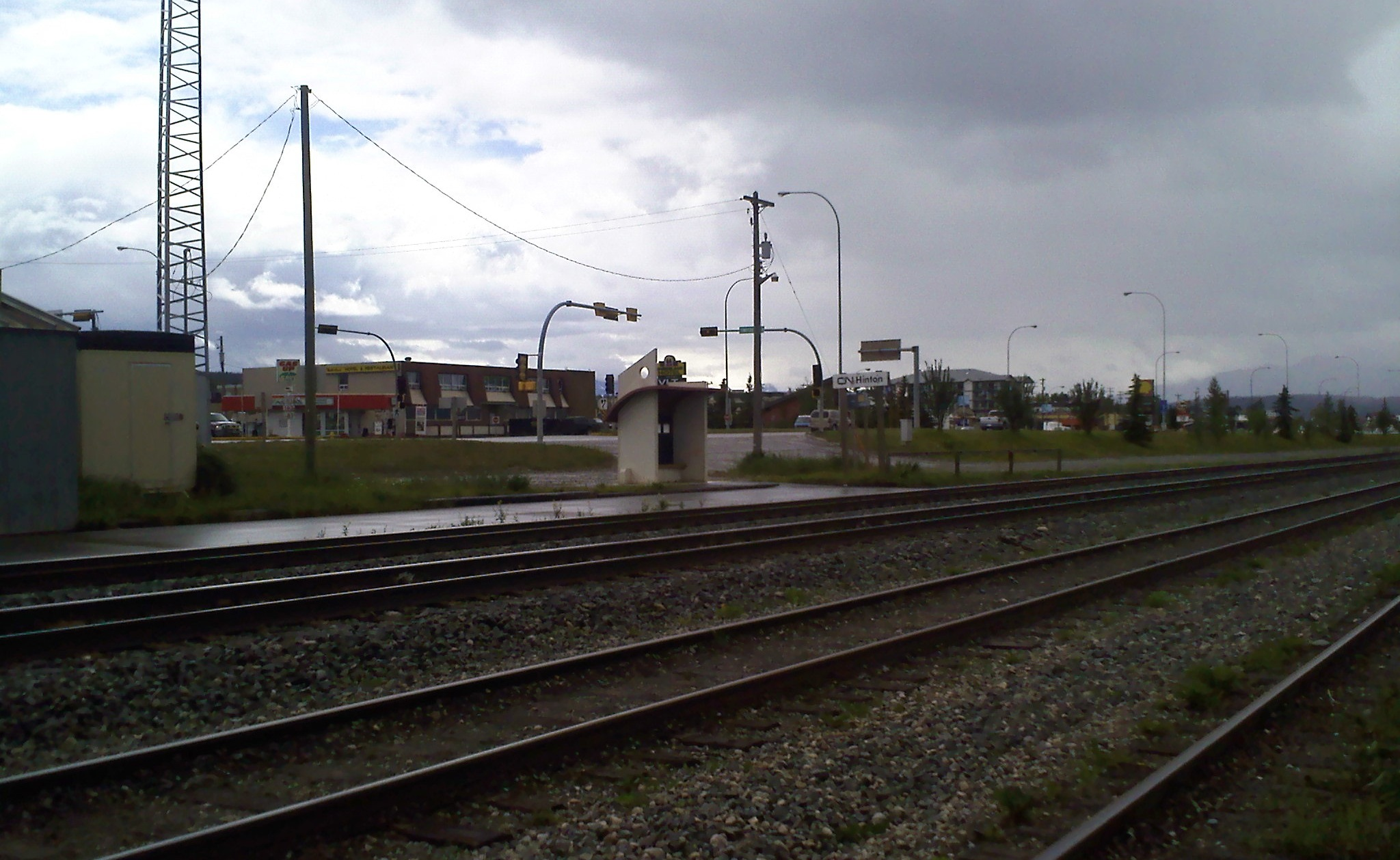
- Shelter at Hinton

General information
- Location: Highway 16 & Switzer Drive, Hinton, Alberta, Canada
- Coordinates: 53.4010°N 117.5884°W
- Platforms: 1 side platform
- Tracks: 2

Construction
- Structure type: Shelter

History
- Opened: 1911
- Former names: Grand Trunk Pacific Railway

Services
Preceding station	Via Rail	Following station
Jasper toward Vancouver	The Canadian	Edson toward Toronto

Former services
Preceding station	Canadian National Railway	Following station
Entrance toward Vancouver	Main Line	Drinnan toward Montreal
Location
- Location within Alberta Location within Canada

The Hinton station is a Via Rail station in Hinton, Alberta. It is on the Canadian National Railway mainline and is served by Via Rail's The Canadian as a flag stop (48 hours advance notice required).

The station was opened in 1911 by the Grand Trunk Pacific Railway. In 2003, the station building was moved to its current location on Gregg Avenue, where it became the Northern Rockies Museum of Culture and Heritage.

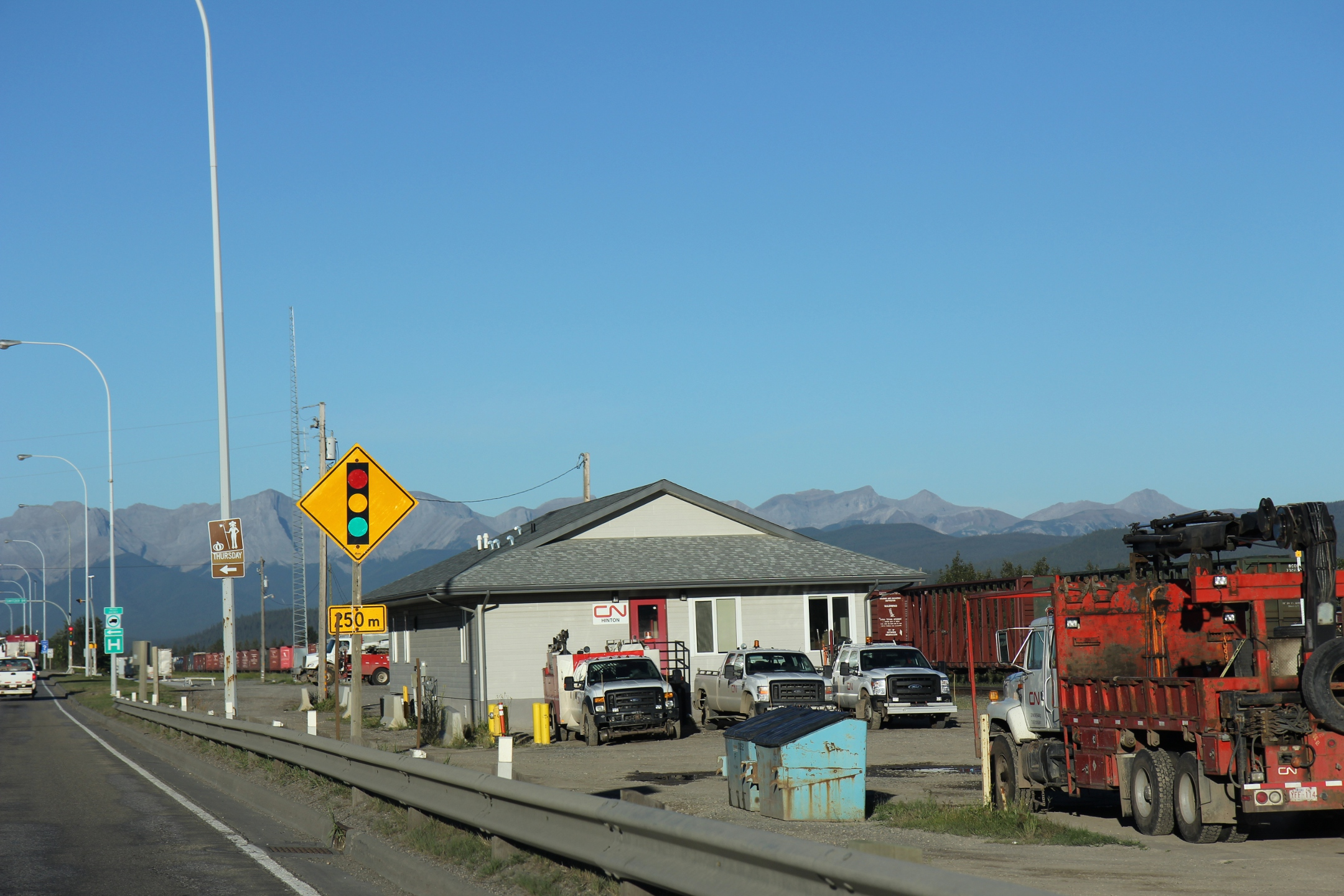
CN office
