= Hinton Martell =

Village in Dorset, England

Coordinates: 50.854°N 1.983°W

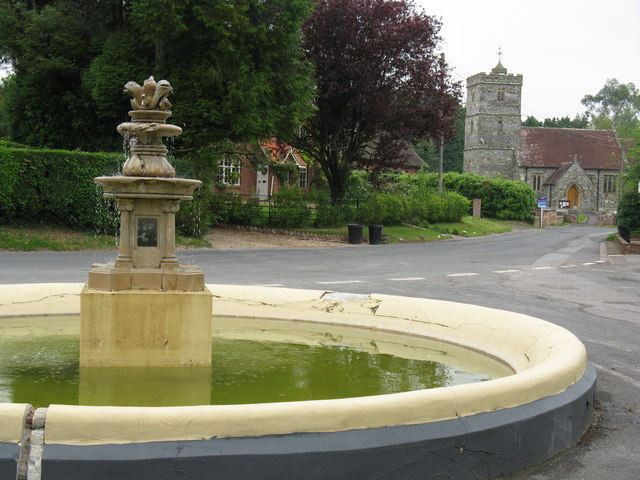
- Fountain and Parish Church

- Location within Dorset
- Population: 368
- OS grid reference: SU013061
- Civil parish: Hinton
- Unitary authority: Dorset
- Ceremonial county: Dorset
- Region: South West
- Country: England
- Sovereign state: United Kingdom
- Post town: WIMBORNE
- Postcode district: BH21
- Dialling code: 01258
- Police: Dorset
- Fire: Dorset and Wiltshire
- Ambulance: South Western
- UK Parliament: North Dorset

Hinton Martell (also known as Hinton Martel) is a village and former civil parish, now in the civil parish of Hinton, in the county of Dorset in southern England. It lies within the Dorset unitary authority area of the county, three miles north of the town of Wimborne Minster. In the 2001 Census the parish had a population of 368. The civil parish was abolished on 1 April 2015 and merged with Hinton Parva to form Hinton.

== History ==
Hinton Martell was once known as Hinetone, the village of the monks. It was owned at this time by Eudo Martel, a Frenchman whose surname meant hammer.

The village has a church, thatched cottages, and a rather unusual fountain. The current fountain is a replacement for an original which was built low for sheep to drink from. In 1905 in his Highways and Byways in Dorset, Sir Frederick Treves called the original "a fountain as may be found in a suburban tea garden or in front of a gaudy Italian villa." He continues, "The fountain, of painted metal, tawdry and flimsy, represents a boy standing in one dish while he holds another on his head. No unhappy detail is spared: the ambitious pedestal, the three impossible dolphins, and the paltry squirt of water, are all here. How this cafe chantant ornament has found its way into a modest and secluded hamlet there is no evidence to show". The fountain was irreparably damaged in the severe winter of 1963. It was replaced, and was revealed in 1965 by Miss Ann Sidney of Poole, the 'Miss World' winner of that year.
