= Westover, Hampshire =

Coordinates: 50.722°N 1.879°W

Westover, Hampshire, is the ancient manor, now in Dorset, over which much of modern Bournemouth has developed. This area of land marked a historic boundary between Celtic and Saxon civilisations, which found expression as the county boundary between Hampshire to the east and Dorset to the west. Geographically detached parts of the manor (for example the tithings of Longham and North Ashley) may have resulted from the post-Civil War breakup of estates formerly belonging to the Lords Arundell of Wardour.

The name probably derives from that of the Dorset Stour, which flows through the manor. At Christchurch, the Stour is joined by the Avon, and at one time the river upstream (west) of this point was known as the "West Stour", while downstream it was known as either the "East Stour" or "Stour & Avon". The area bordering the West Stour (referred to as 'Westesture' or "Westur') became known as the Liberty of Westover.

Westover is a 'liberty' which meant that whoever owned it gained certain extra rights by dint of their possession. The name was used in an Act of Parliament in 1802 when the heathland of Westover was enclosed. Just over 30 years later, the name was used for one of the proposed new roads as holiday villas were built. Westover Road remains one of the principal commercial streets of modern Bournemouth.

It has always been co-owned with the manor of Christchurch.

== See also ==
- Holdenhurst
