= Hinton Admiral =

Country house in Hampshire, England

Coordinates: 50°45′09″N 1°42′51″W

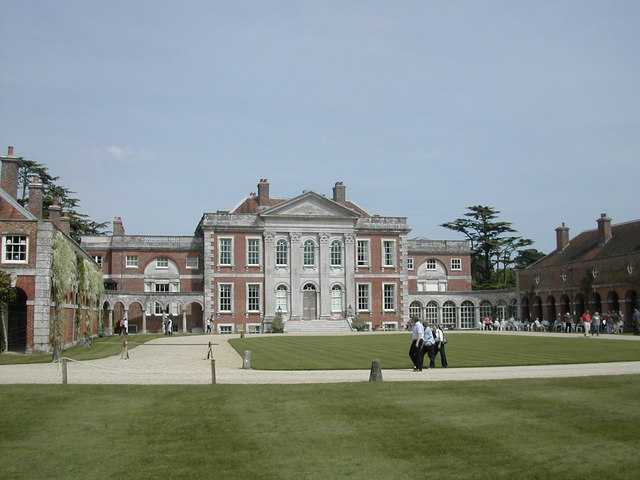
Hinton Admiral House

Hinton Admiral is the estate and ancestral home of the Tapps-Gervis-Meyrick family and located in the settlement of Hinton, near Bransgore in Hampshire, England. It is a Grade I Listed building.

The walled gardens to the north of the house and the wall to the terrace in front of the gardens of the house are both Grade II listed. Heathfield Lodge, the former lodge building to Hinton Admiral on the Lyndhurst Road, is Grade II listed.

The gardens are open to the public by arrangement.

== History ==
The current house was built in 1720 for Sir Peter Mews but was remodelled after a fire in 1777. Additional alterations were made around 1905 by the landscape architect Harold Peto, who remodelled the interior in an early 18th-century style.

When Sir Peter Mews died in 1726 the house eventually passed to his nephew George Ivison Tapps, whose descendants still occupy the house

Hinton Admiral railway station opened in 1885 on the South West Main Line.

The area known as Hinton or Hinton Admiral was variously spelt Hentune (11th century); Henton (13th-17th century); Henton Aumarle (14th century); Hempton (or Hompton) Aumarle, Henton Amerle (or Amarle), Hynton Amerell, (15th century); Hington Amerell, Hynton Admyrall, (16th century).

== See also ==
- Hinton (place name)
