= Hinton-in-the-Hedges =

Village in Northamptonshire, England

Coordinates: 52.0251°N 1.1885°W

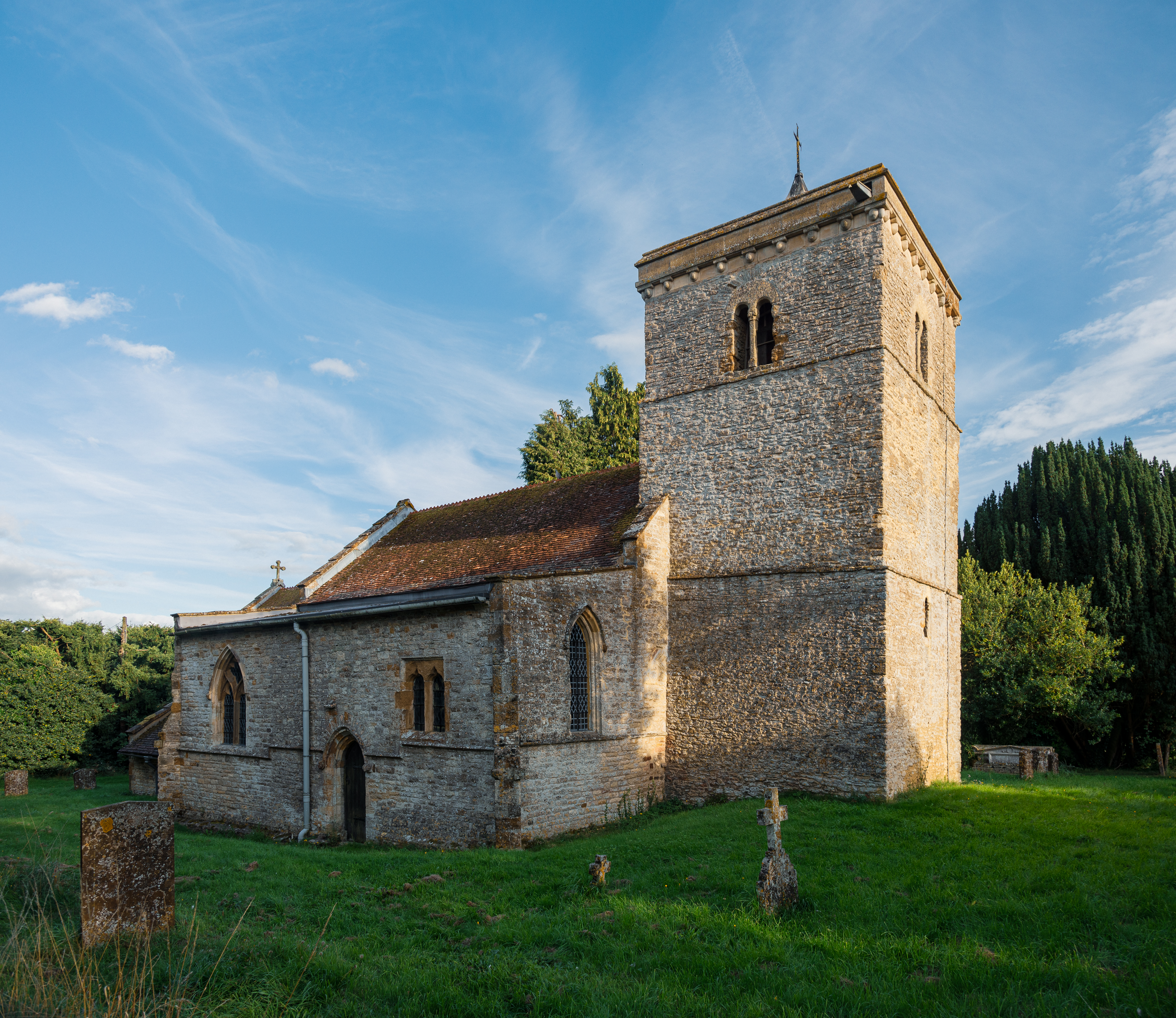
- Holy Trinity Church, Hinton in the Hedges

- Location within Northamptonshire
- Population: 199 (2021 census)
- OS grid reference: SP5536
  - London: 70 mi (110 km)
- Unitary authority: West Northamptonshire
- Ceremonial county: Northamptonshire
- Region: East Midlands
- Country: England
- Sovereign state: United Kingdom
- Post town: Brackley
- Postcode district: NN13
- Dialling code: 01280
- Police: Northamptonshire
- Fire: Northamptonshire
- Ambulance: East Midlands
- UK Parliament: South Northamptonshire

Hinton-in-the-Hedges is a small village and civil parish in West Northamptonshire, England, two miles (three kilometres) due west of the town of Brackley. West of the village is Hinton-in-the-Hedges Airfield. At the 2021 census, the civil parish had a population of 199 people in 84 households.

== Toponymy ==
The name was recorded as Hintone in the Domesday Book of 1086 AD; the owner was Geoffrey de Mandeville. It was recorded as Hynton in the edge in 1549. The toponym might be "village in the hill-side".

== History ==
The parish church is dedicated to The Most Holy Trinity. A church has existed here since Saxon times the earliest recorded Rector being Sir Richard de Hynton in 1275. There are monuments to Sir William Hinton (d.13th century), Raynold Braye (d.1582) and Salathiell Crewe (d.1686).

The Old Rectory in the village is dated 1678 and there are a number of other building which are listed.

The Imperial Gazetteer of England and Wales described the parish in the 1870s as follows:

On the Buckinghamshire railway, 2 miles [3 km] West by North of Brackley railway station. Post town, Brackley. Acres, 2, 070 [838 ha]. Real property, £2, 462. Pop., 178. Houses, 39. The manor belongs to W. Cartwright, Esq. The living is a rectory, united with the rectory of Steane, in the diocese of Peterborough. Value, £500. Patron, Earl Spencer. The church is early English; consists of nave, chancel, and North aisle, with low square tower; and contains a remarkable ancient altar tomb, and a very ancient and curiously carved font. There are alms houses with about £38 a year, and a subscription school. Gray, the author of "Memoria Technica", is said to have been a native.

== Demographics ==
Census population of Hinton-in-the-Hedges parish
Census	Population	Female	Male	Households	Source
2001	179	92	87	71	
2011	167	76	91	78	
2021	199	95	104	84	
