= Bransgore =

Coordinates: 50.780°N 1.733°W

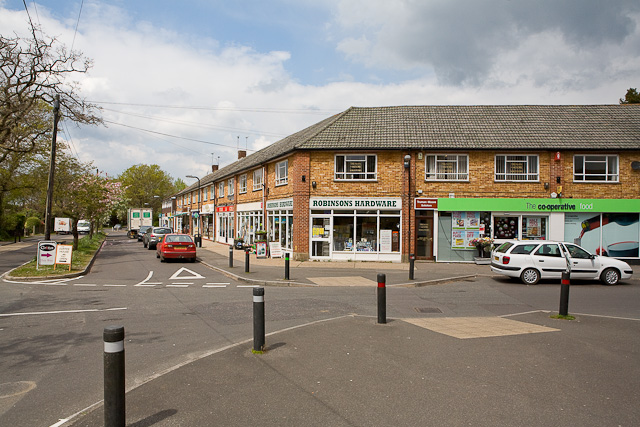
- Shops at Bransgore

- Location within Hampshire
- Population: 4,333 (2001)
- OS grid reference: SZ1897
- Civil parish: Bransgore
- District: New Forest
- Shire county: Hampshire
- Region: South East
- Country: England
- Sovereign state: United Kingdom
- Post town: Christchurch
- Postcode district: BH23
- Dialling code: 01425
- Police: Hampshire and Isle of Wight
- Fire: Hampshire and Isle of Wight
- Ambulance: South Central
- UK Parliament: New Forest West

Bransgore is a village and civil parish within the New Forest District, Hampshire, England. The village developed in the 19th century when a church and a school were built. It is technically classified as an urban area, although in some respects it still has the picturesque character of a rural English village.

== Overview ==
Bransgore is a village and civil parish in the New Forest District of Hampshire. The parish includes the village of Thorney Hill, and the hamlets of Neacroft, Godwinscroft, Beckley, Hinton, and Waterditch. At the time of the last national census of 2011, Bransgore had a total population of 4,238, with just over half being aged between 20 and 64. Bransgore now straddles the border of the newly created New Forest National Park, with the majority of the village being outside the park.

Bransgore has a wide variety of shops including a post office, pharmacy, bakery, greengrocer, hairdresser, and take-away food shops. There are also several pubs/restaurants. Bransgore has a village sports field with a children's playground. The sports field is the location of the Village Fun Day event which is held each summer.

== History ==
The earliest deeds mentioning Bransgore date from the 1730s. The village was called, in 1759, "Bransgoer Common", and in 1817 "Bransgrove". The word "gore" in Middle English means a triangular piece of land. It is uncertain who or what "Bran" refers to.

A local myth is that the name Bransgore came from one of King Alfred's battles against the Danes, Brans from "brains" and Gore from "blood". In the 19th century, Victorian romantics even persuaded the Ordnance Survey to mark on their maps the site of a battle at Bransgore, on the road leading to Sopley. There is unfortunately, no truth in this story, and the name Bransgore does not derive from "brains and gore."

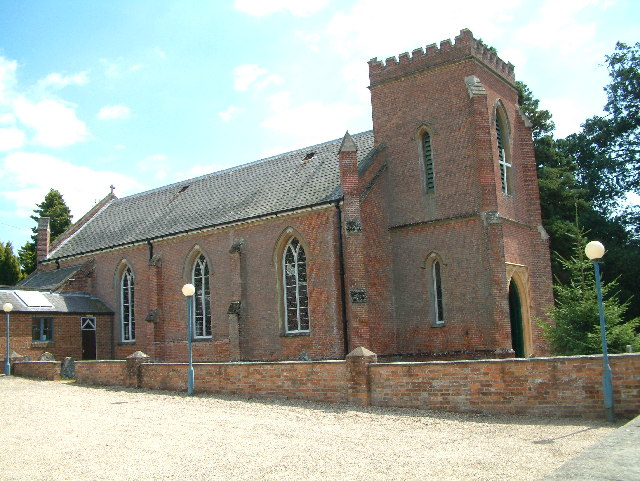
St. Mary's Church, Bransgore

The Crown Inn in Bransgore dates from the 18th century, as does the Three Tuns pub. The church of Saint Mary the Virgin was erected in 1822 as a chapel of ease. The church is of brick with stone dressings, with a tower and originally a spire. However, the spire was removed in 1967. The early 16th-century font, which is said to have come from Christchurch, is octagonal, with a monogram J D, perhaps for "John Draper," the last Prior of Christchurch Priory. The ecclesiastical parish of Bransgore was formed in 1875 from parts of Christchurch and Sopley. Henry William Wilberforce, son of William Wilberforce (known for his campaign against slavery), was once the vicar of Saint Mary's church. He founded a school in the village in 1841. In 1895, a National school was built accommodating 174 pupils, which is now the Primary School.

All Saints church near Thorney Hill is a grade I listed, Edwardian Baroque church, built in 1906. Designed by Detmar Blow and constructed from Caen stone and rendered brick. Inside are wall paintings by Phoebe Anna Traquair (1852–1936) of Te Deum featuring local people.

Between 1894 and 1974, Bransgore was part of the civil parish of Christchurch East. Following the county boundary changes of 1974, Christchurch East parish was split into the parish of Bransgore (Hampshire) and the parish of Burton (Dorset).

In 2023, the building of 100 homes in a flood prone area near Derrit Lane in Bransgore was approved despite many objections.

== Twin towns ==
Bransgore is twinned with:

- Saint-Georges-Montcocq, France
