= Richard Erle-Drax-Grosvenor =

Richard Erle-Drax-Grosvenor may refer to:

- Richard Erle-Drax-Grosvenor (1762–1819), British MP
- Richard Erle-Drax-Grosvenor (1797–1828), British MP, son of the above
