= Church of St John The Baptist, Batheaston =

Church in Somerset, England

Church of St John the Baptist
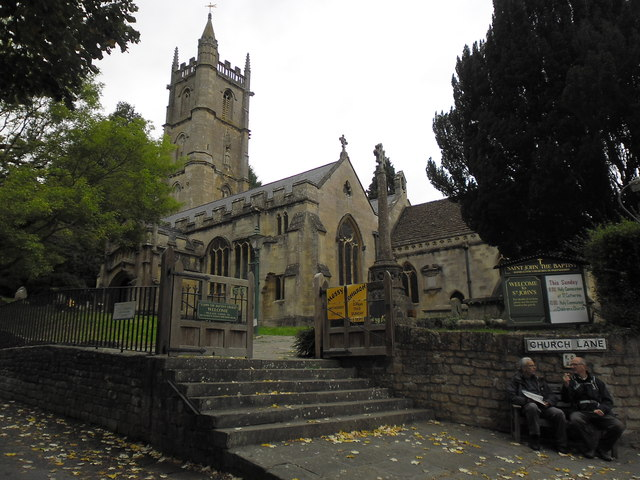

- Location within Somerset
- 51°24′35″N 2°19′17″W
- Location: Northend, Batheaston, Somerset BA1 7EF, England

Listed Building – Grade II*
- Designated: 1 February 1956
- Reference no.: 1320501

The Church of St John the Baptist in Northend, Batheaston within the English county of Somerset was built in the 12th century and remodelled in the 15th century. It is a Grade II* listed building.

The parish of St John the Baptist in Batheaston is joined with St Catherine, which includes the church of the same name. It is within the archeadconry of Bath.

The west tower has four stages with a pierced embattled parapet, setback buttresses, projecting octagonal stairs, and a turret at the south-east corner which terminates in a spirelet. It was built around 1460, and was rebuilt in 1834 by John Pinch the Younger, of Bath. It has pointed perpendicular two-light windows with cusped heads. The east side also has a canopied niche containing a figure, probably of St John.

The tower holds a peal of eight bells.

In the churchyard are several chest tombs which are also listed structures.

== See also ==
- List of ecclesiastical parishes in the Diocese of Bath and Wells
