= George Pennant =

George Pennant may refer to:

- George Douglas Pennant (1836–1907), British peer and landowner
- George Dawkins Pennant (1764–1840), British politician
