= Batheaston House =

Grade II* listed house in Somerset

Coordinates: 51°24′21″N 2°19′11″W

Batheaston House is a Grade II* listed house at 290 High Street, Batheaston, Somerset, England. The house is dated 1712 and was built for Henry Walters, a clothier who succeeded to property at Bath Easton and St Catherine through Henry Blanchard.

== History ==
Historic England records the house as having a 1712 datestone, with the initials "HW", relating to Henry Waters, High Sheriff of Somerset. A Bath Record Office burial record identifies Henry Walters, who died in 1753, as the son of Eldad Walters and Mary, née Blanchard. The house remained in the family's hands until 1921.

The Blanchard family were also associated with nearby St Catherine's Court. Historic England records that the St Catherine's Court estate was leased to John Blanchard in 1591, later bought by the Blanchards, and eventually passed by marriage to the Parry family.

== Architecture ==
Batheaston House is a Queen Anne style house, built of ashlar dressed stone, with a Cotswold stone slate roof. Historic England describes it as having two storeys, a basement and attics, raised quoins, a moulded cornice, a five-window front and glazing-bar sash windows in bolection-moulded architraves. The entrance has a Tuscan doorcase, and the interior includes panelling and moulded plasterwork.

== Recent history ==
The house was restored in 2015 by architectural firm Watson, Bertram and Fell.

In 2024 and 2025, Batheaston House was offered as the prize in the Omaze Million Pound House Draw, Bath, in support of the British Heart Foundation. The British Heart Foundation stated that the draw raised £4.6 million for the charity.
