= Cholmeley Dering =

Cholmeley Dering may refer to:

- Cholmeley Dering (died 1836), MP
- Sir Cholmeley Dering, 4th Baronet (1679 – 1711), politician and duellist
