= John Riggs Miller =

Anglo-Irish politician

Sir John Riggs-Miller, 1st Baronet (c. 1744 – 28 May 1798) was an Anglo-Irish politician who championed reform of the customary system of weights and measures in favour of a scientifically founded system.

== Early life ==
He was born John Miller in County Clare, Ireland. His father was John Miller and his mother, John's wife, Anne née Browne. He was educated at Dalston School and Eton College before joining the British Army in 1760 as a cornet. He was on active service in the Battle of Emsdorf and at Belleisle, France in 1761, before retiring from the army in 1763. He was admitted to study at the Middle Temple in 1765, though does not seem to have made any progress with his legal studies. He also studied at Trinity Hall, Cambridge, though he did not graduate. In August 1765 he married Anna née Riggs (1741–1781), adding her name to his own. They had a son and a daughter. In July 1762 he inherited his family estates; they were worth little, but his wife brought substantial wealth to the marriage, enabling him to build a prestigious house at Batheaston, Somerset. The couple there held a fortnightly literary salon along with competitions and prizes. The prizes were drawn from an ornately decorated Roman vase and the affair was mocked as Lady Miller's Vase, though that did not dissuade distinguished contributions from the like of David Garrick and Christopher Anstey. In 1778 he was created a Baronet, of Ballicasey in the County of Clare. Anna died on 24 June 1781; on 9 September 1795 he married Jane née Sell, widow of Sir Thomas Davenport. He was elected Member of Parliament for Newport, Cornwall in 1784.

== Weights and measures ==
He made a careful study of the contemporary state of weights and measures before proposing reform in the British House of Commons on 5 February 1790. In France, Charles Maurice Talleyrand was pursuing similar goals with a unit of length based on the seconds pendulum, as was Thomas Jefferson in the US having been charged by President George Washington with measurement reform. Talleyrand had ambitions that France would establish itself at the centre of a new international measurement system that would form the basis of global trade and, on hearing of Riggs-Miller's initiative, proposed a tripartite collaboration. After some diplomatic manoeuvring by Talleyrand, the definitive pendulum measurement was agreed to take place in France. However, France's official approach for collaboration was then rejected by Foreign Secretary the Duke of Leeds. Riggs-Miller continued to campaign on the matter but, when parliament was dissolved in 1790, he was not re-elected. Ultimately, in 1791, the French National Assembly vetoed the pendulum in favour of the meridional definition of the metre, bringing an effective end to hopes of collaboration. France unilaterally adopted the metric system in 1793.

== After parliament ==
After parliament, Riggs-Miller settled in Bloomsbury Square, London. He allegedly became known in society as an inveterate gossip and newsmonger, and was a well-known figure in many gentlemen's clubs. He died suddenly and was succeeded in the baronetcy by his son by his first marriage, John Edward Augustus Miller (1770–1825). Riggs-Miller was buried in Bath Abbey.

== Notes ==
Parliament of Great Britain
| Preceded by Viscount Maitland; John Coghill | Member of Parliament for Newport (Cornwall); 1784–1790; With: John Coghill 1784–1785; William Mitford 1785–1790 | Succeeded by Viscount Feilding; Charles Rainsford |
Baronetage of Ireland
| New creation | Baronet (of Ballicasey); 1778–1798 | Succeeded by John Edward Augustus Riggs-Miller |
