= Church of St Catherine, St Catherine =

Church in Somerset, England

Church of St Catherine
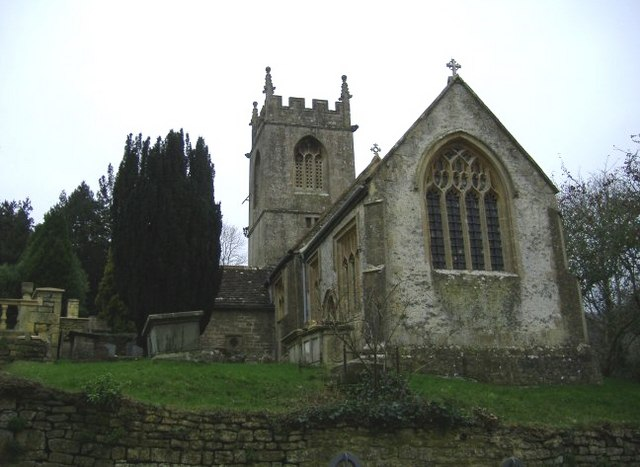

- Location within Somerset
- 51°25′51″N 2°19′16″W
- Location: St Catherine, Somerset, England

History
- Built: 12th century

Listed Building – Grade II*
- Designated: 1 February 1956
- Reference no.: 1277121

The Church of St Catherine is an Anglican parish church in St Catherine, Somerset, England. It was built in the 12th century as a chapel of ease of Bath and has been designated as a Grade II* listed building.

The manor of St Catherine belonged to Prior Cantlow of Bath Abbey in medieval times. The church was remodelled by him around 1490, with the tower being added in 1503, and underwent further changes in 1704, 1846 and 1880. The interior includes a 12th-century font and a 15th-century pulpit.

The church stands within the grounds of the 16th century St Catherine's Court, which is Grade I listed.

The parish is part of the benefice of Batheaston with St Catherine within the archdeaconry of Bath. St Catherine's has been part of the parish since it was annexed in 1258.

== See also ==
- List of ecclesiastical parishes in the Diocese of Bath and Wells
