= Joseph Richardson (1755–1803) =

English author and politician

Joseph Richardson (1755–1803) was an English author and politician.

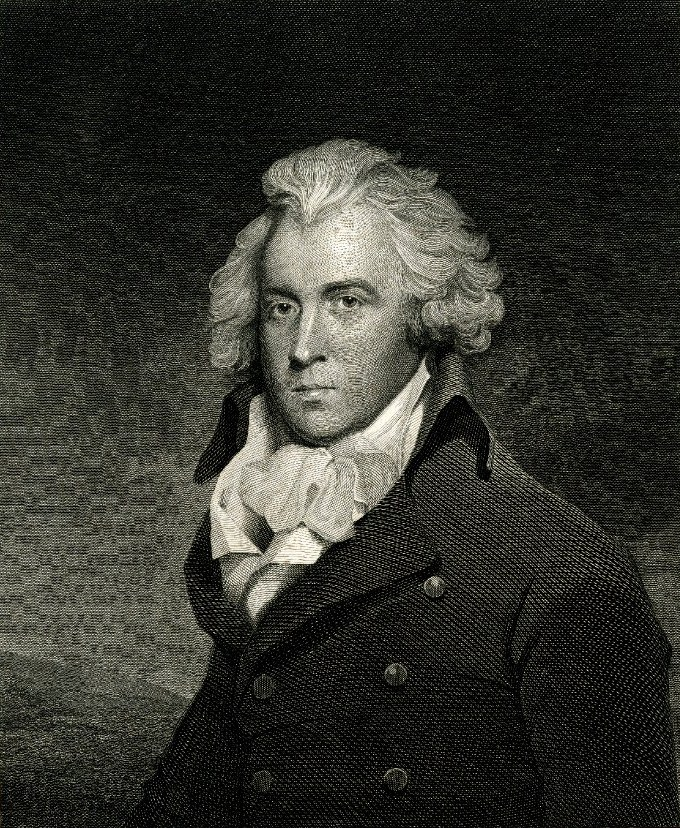
Joseph Richardson

== Life ==
Born at Hexham, Northumberland, he was the only child of Joseph Richardson, a tradesman. He was educated at Haydon Bridge school and admitted as a sizar at St John's College, Cambridge, on 4 July 1774. His father's finances were not adequate to fully support his son's education, and the cost of his residence at college was borne by a titled lady of Northumberland who discovered his talents, but in 1778, she cut off her contributions. Although he was readmitted as a pensioner on 25 September 1780, he left the university without taking a degree.

Richardson, intended as he was for the church, entered the Middle Temple on 24 March 1781, where he was duly called to the bar. In London, he in fact concentrated on journalism, and after appearing as counsel in a few contested election petitions, gave up the legal profession.

Richardson's earliest journalistic post was on the staff of The Morning Post, then still a Whig paper, and he later became one of its proprietors. While connected with the Post, he fought a duel in Hyde Park with Sir Henry Bate Dudley and was wounded in the right arm. He also contributed letters, signed "Englishman", to a paper called The Citizen.

Richard Wilson, Member of Parliament for Ipswich and an old friend, introduced Richardson to the Duke of Northumberland. The Duke's influence brought him the seat of Newport in Cornwall in Parliament from 1796 until his death. He never had the confidence to speak in the House of Commons.

For many years, Richard assisted Richard Brinsley Sheridan in the management of Drury Lane Theatre, and ultimately acquired a share in the property. (The money for this purchase was mainly from the Duke of Northumberland, and on Richardson's death, the Duke cancelled the loan.) His comedy, The Fugitive, was brought out at the King's Theatre in the Haymarket by the Drury Lane Company with success on 20 April 1792, and, when printed, passed through three editions. The prologue was by Richard Tickell and the epilogue by John Burgoyne. Richardson also wrote the prologue to the Glorious First of June, the after-piece which was acted at Drury Lane on 2 July 1794 for the benefit of the widows and children of the sailors who died at the naval battle of that name.

Despite failing health, Richardson stuck to the rigorous parliamentary life. One night, he remained in the House of Commons until five o'clock in the morning to record his vote in the small minority with Charles James Fox. He then went to the Wheatsheaf Inn, near Virginia Water, and died on 9 June 1803. He was buried in Egham churchyard on 13 June.

== Works ==
As a satirist, Richard was best known for his contributions to the Rolliad and the Probationary odes—publications each of which passed through 21 editions. For the former, Richardson wrote Nos. 4, 10, and 11 in part i. and 3 and 4 in part ii.; while for the latter, he wrote Nos. 4 and 19, the Delavaliad, other poems, and much of the prose. He wrote many other fugitive pieces for the Whigs, and contributed to the Political Miscellanies (1790). His best-known satire was entitled Jekyll, an Eclogue (see under Joseph Jekyll). He published for his party in 1787 an anonymous pamphlet, called The complete Investigation of Mr. Eden's Treaty, which embodied reputable commercial statistics.

Sarah Richardson published by subscription Literary Relics of the late Joseph Richardson (1807). This included the play The Fugitive, a few short poems, and a sketch of his life, written by John Taylor. Some letters by Richardson are in Samuel Parr's Works and Thomas Moore's Sheridan.

== Family ==
Richardson's wife, Sarah, a relative of Isaac Watts, survived him, with four daughters.

== Notes ==
Attribution

This article incorporates text from a publication now in the public domain: Lee, Sidney, ed. (1896). "Richardson, Joseph (1755-1803)". Dictionary of National Biography. Vol. 48. London: Smith, Elder & Co.

Parliament of Great Britain
Preceded by Viscount Feilding; Charles Rainsford	Member of Parliament for Newport, Cornwall; 1796 – 1800; With: William Northey	Succeeded by Parliament of the United Kingdom
Parliament of the United Kingdom
Preceded by Parliament of Great Britain	Member of Parliament for Newport, Cornwall; 1801 – 1803; With: William Northey	Succeeded by William Northey; Edward Morris
