= Charles Rainsford =

British Army general (1728–1809)

General Charles Rainsford FRS
- Born: 3 February 1728; West Ham, Essex
- Died: 24 May 1809 (aged 81); 29 Soho Square, London
- Burial place: Tower of London
- Military career
- Allegiance: United Kingdom
- Branch: British Army
- Rank: General

General Charles Rainsford (3 February 1728 – 24 May 1809) was a British Army officer.

== Career ==
He was the second son of alderman Francis Rainsford (died 1770) and his wife, Isabella and received his first education from a cleric friend of Francis's at Great Clacton. His uncle, also Charles Rainsford (died 1778), was deputy lieutenant of the Tower of London and used his influence to get him made second cornet in General Bland's 3rd dragoons in March 1744, a unit at that time active in the Flanders theatre of the War of the Austrian Succession. Rainsford joined it immediately, carrying its standard at Fontenoy and soon after being appointed ensign in the Coldstream Guards. With his new unit he returned to England to face the Jacobite rising, rising to major of brigade and colonel's aide-de-camp. He then served as private secretary to Tyrawley, governor of Gibraltar (1756–57) before returning to England again in 1760. The following year he was given a company to command under Prince Ferdinand of Brunswick in Germany, before re-joining Tyrawley as aide-de-camp, brigadier-general and chief engineer in 1762 to face the threatened Spanish invasion of Portugal. Ordered home in 1763, with promotion second major in the Grenadier Guards and equerry to William, duke of Gloucester (1766–80), he commanded the army detachment at the king's bench prison at Southwark after the May 1768 riot.

He also served as MP for Maldon (1772–74) until his patron William Nassau de Zuylestein, 4th Earl of Rochford's nephew and heir was elected. He also held Bere Alston (1787–88) thanks to help from Algernon Percy, Lord Lovaine (brother of Hugh Percy, 2nd Duke of Northumberland), leaving it over the Regency Bill, with Lovaine backing the government, but Gloucester and Northumberland opposing it. He was rewarded by Northumberland with Newport, Cornwall (1790–96), before leaving parliament. He had taken little part in parliamentary proceedings, serving at the same time as governor of Chester (1776–96), king's aide-de-camp (1777–82), commander of the troops stationed in Hyde Park and then Blackheath against the Gordon riots (1780) and nominal commander of the Menorca garrison (1782, though it surrendered to the Spanish before he arrived to take up the post). He was also elected a fellow of the Royal Society in 1779, and was also a fellow of the Society of Antiquaries of London, a Rosicrucian, a Freemason and researched alchemy. In 1782 Rainsford and Benedict Chastanier reached out to kindred Illuminist groups in Berlin and Paris by publishing a brochure in French about degrees of the Universal Society. In summer 1783 Rainsford and William Bousie, an Anglo-French merchant, began corresponding with the Parisian lodge of the Philaléthes, preparatory to the Philaléthes convention in Paris in April 1785 to review the rites of many para-Masonic and esoteric societies. Rainsford provided information on Emanuel Swedenborg, Baal Shem of London and the Kabbalistic symbolism of higher degrees. He was then sent to be Robert Boyd's second-in-command at Gibraltar on the outbreak of Britain's war with Revolutionary France, and took over after Boyd's death as Governor (1794–95). On his return to England he became governor of Cliff Fort, Tynemouth, his last active posting. On his death in London in 1809 he was buried in a vault in the chancel of the chapel of St Peter ad Vincula in the Tower of London, alongside his first wife, his father and his uncle Charles.

== Marriages and issue ==
1. on 18 July 1775 Elizabeth (1758–1781), daughter of Edward Miles
2. on 16 February 1789, Ann Cornwallis (d. 1 February 1798), youngest daughter of Sir William More Molyneux of Loseley Park, Guildford – the marriage remained childless.

He and Elizabeth had three children:

- Colonel William Henry Rainsford (bap. 1776, d. 1823)
- Julia Anne
- Josephina, baptised with Sir Joseph Yorke as godfather, died in infancy

== Works ==
His nearly forty volumes of manuscript are now held by the British Library.

Parliament of Great Britain
Preceded by John Bullock; John Huske	Member of Parliament for Maldon; 1772–1774; With: John Bullock	Succeeded by John Strutt; John Savage Nassau
Preceded by Viscount Feilding; Earl of Mornington	Member of Parliament for Bere Alston; 1787–1788; With: Viscount Feilding	Succeeded by Viscount Feilding; John Mitford
Preceded by Sir John Riggs Miller; William Mitford	Member of Parliament for Newport; 1790–1796; With: Viscount Feilding	Succeeded by William Northey; Joseph Richardson
Government offices
Preceded by Sir Robert Boyd	Governor of Gibraltar; 1794–1795	Succeeded by Charles O'Hara
Military offices
Preceded by James Abercrombie	Colonel, 44th Foot; 1781–1809	Succeeded by Thomas Trigge
