= André baronets =

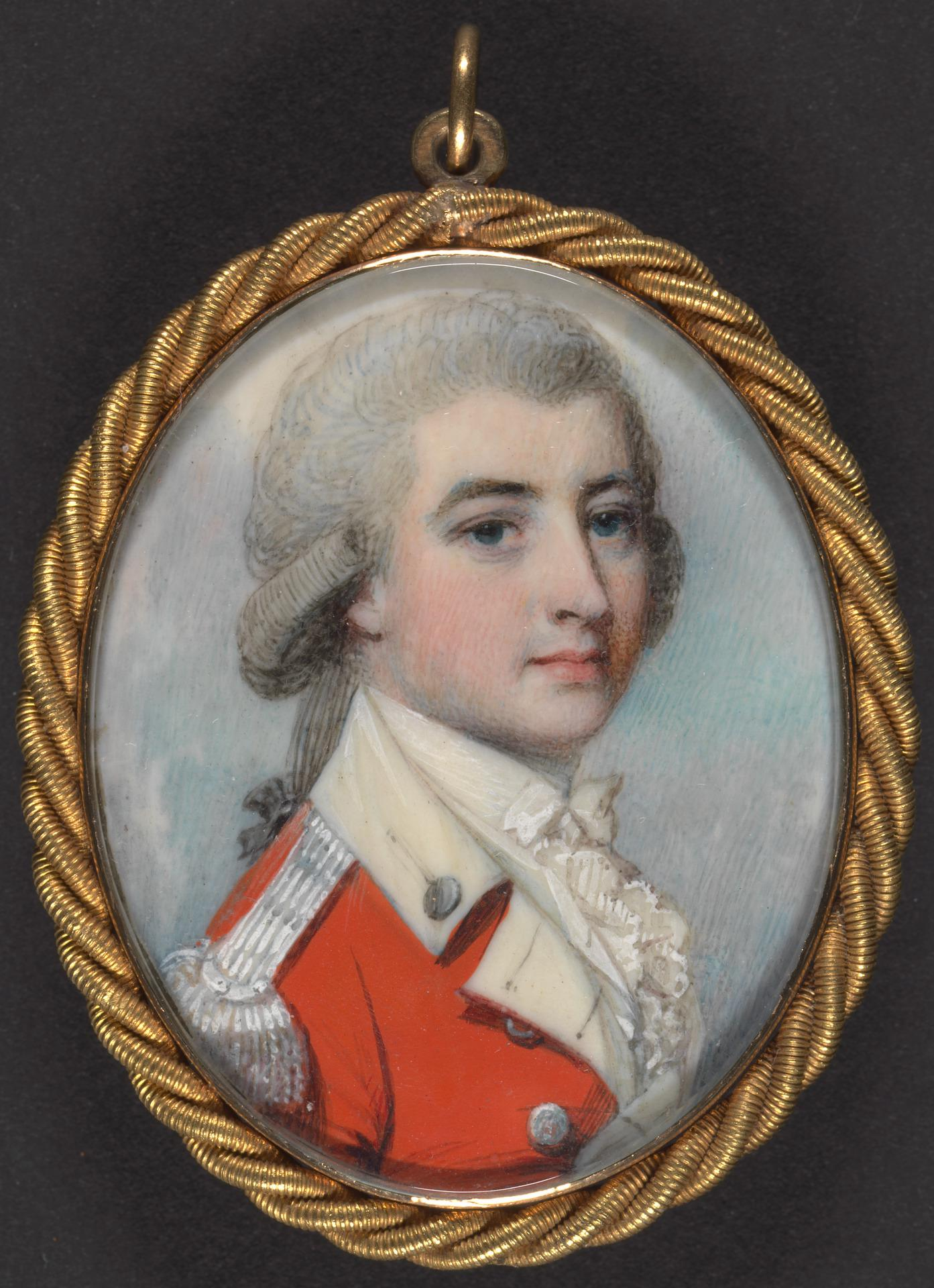
Major John André, whose brother William André was created a baronet in his honour

The André baronetcy, of Southampton in the County of Southampton, was a title in the baronetage of Great Britain. It was created on 4 March 1781 for William André, in recognition of the services rendered by his brother John André, who was executed in 1780 after being convicted of espionage by a Continental Army tribunal during the American War of Independence. The title became extinct on William's death in 1802.

== André baronets, of Southampton (1781) ==
- Sir William Lewis André, 1st Baronet (1760–1802)

== Notes ==
Baronetage of Great Britain
Preceded by Banks baronets	André baronets of Southampton; 24 March 1781	Succeeded by Coghill baronets
