= Riggs-Miller baronets =

Extinct baronetcy in the Baronetage of Ireland

The Riggs-Miller Baronetcy, of Ballicasey in the County of Clare, was a title within the Baronetage of Ireland. This title was created on 24 August 1778 for John Riggs-Miller, who later became a Member of Parliament for Newport. He is best remembered for advocating a reform of the customary system of weights and measures in favor of a scientifically based system. Born as John Miller, he adopted the additional surname of Riggs in 1765, which was the maiden name of his wife, Anna, the daughter and heiress of Edward Riggs. The title became extinct upon the death of their son, the second Baronet, in 1825.

== Riggs-Miller baronets, of Ballicasey (1778) ==
- Sir John Riggs-Miller, 1st Baronet (died 1798)
- Sir John Edward Augustus Riggs-Miller, 2nd Baronet (1770–1825)

== Arms ==
Coat of arms of Riggs-Miller of Ballicasey
Notes The crescent denotes that Wordsworth is a second son. Crest A wolf's head erased Gules, gorged with a collar wavy Argent and charged on the neck with a cross pattée Or. Escutcheon Argent, on a fess wavy Azure, between three wolves' heads erased Gules, a cross pattée between two trefois Or Motto Malo mori quam foedari
