= Charles O'Hara =

British Army officer and colonial administrator (1740–1802)

General Charles O'Hara
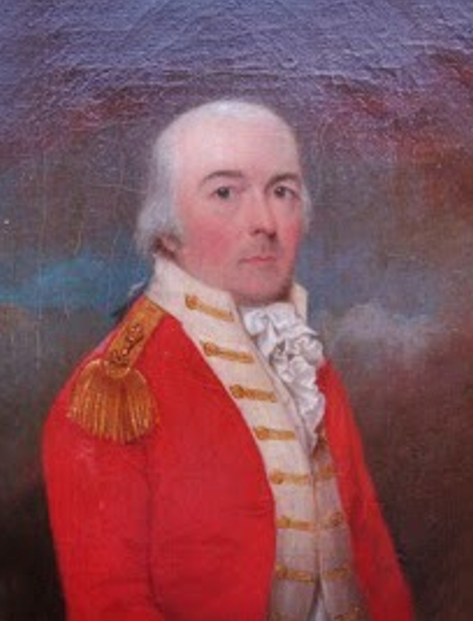
- c. 1791–1792 portrait

Governor of Gibraltar
- In office 30 December 1795 – 25 February 1802
- Preceded by: Charles Rainsford
- Succeeded by: Charles Barnett (Note: Following the death of O'Hara, Barnett was appointed Governor on an interim basis until the arrival of Prince Edward, Duke of Kent and Strathearn)

Personal details
- Born: 1740 Lisbon, Portugal
- Died: 25 February 1802 (aged 61–62) Gibraltar

Military service
- Allegiance: Great Britain; United Kingdom
- Branch/service: British Army
- Years of service: 1752–1802
- Rank: General
- Unit: 3rd Dragoons; Coldstream Guards
- Commands: Africa Corps; 22nd Foot; 74th Foot
- Battles/wars: Seven Years' War; American War of Independence (surrendered); French Revolutionary Wars (POW)

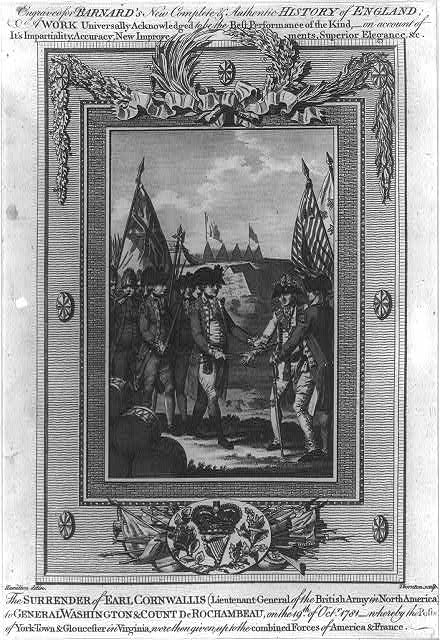
General O'Hara surrenders the sword of Lieutenant-General Cornwallis to Count de Rochambeau and General Washington. Anonymous engraving (ca. 1783)

General Charles O'Hara (1740 – 25 February 1802) was a British Army officer and colonial administrator who served in the Seven Years' War, American War of Independence and French Revolutionary Wars. During the American War of Independence, he served in the Brigade of Guards as part of the army of Lord Cornwallis and was wounded during the Battle of Guilford Courthouse. At the conclusion of the siege of Yorktown, he surrendered to the Americans on behalf of Cornwallis. O'Hara subsequently served in the War of the First Coalition, where he was captured at the siege of Toulon by French troops under Napoleon. Following his release, O'Hara served as the governor of Gibraltar from 1795 until his death in 1802. O'Hara's Battery and O'Hara's Tower in Gibraltar were named after him.

== Early life ==
Charles O'Hara was born in 1740 in Lisbon, Portugal, the illegitimate son of James O'Hara, 2nd Baron Tyrawley and his Portuguese mistress. He was sent to Westminster School and on 23 December 1752 was commissioned into the British Army's 3rd (King's Own) Regiment of Dragoons at the rank of cornet. O'Hara was promoted to lieutenant in the second battalion of the Coldstream Regiment of Foot Guards on 14 January 1756, shortly before the outbreak of the Seven Years' War.

== Seven Years' War ==
During the Seven Years' War O'Hara served in Germany as an aide-de-camp to Major-general John Manners, Marquess of Granby, the senior officer of the British contingent of the allied army under Field Marshal Duke Ferdinand of Brunswick-Wolfenbüttel. In 1762 O'Hara served under his father alongside Charles Lee in repulsing the Spanish invasion of Portugal. Although a disciplinarian O'Hara was extremely popular with the troops under his command.

== Senegambia ==
In 1765 O'Hara was appointed as the first governor of the Province of Senegambia, which Britain had formed in that year following the British capture of Senegal in mid-1758. O'Hara's appointment came at a time when the British government was attempting to expand its influence in West Africa and attract colonists from Britain to the region. On 25 July 1766 he was appointed as commandant of the Africa Corps at the rank of lieutenant colonel; the unit consisted of British military prisoners pardoned for their crimes in exchange for accepting a lifetime of service in Africa.

O'Hara entered into a relationship with the signare Coumba Poole, a common practice for European men in Senegal, and in 1769 was promoted to captain in the Coldstream Guards. During his tenure as governor O'Hara supported the Emirate of Trarza's wars with the neighbouring kingdom of Waalo in order to prevent the latter from becoming powerful enough to dictate the terms of exchange on the Senegal River. He personally led military expeditions into the countryside around Saint-Louis and ordered the resulting captives to be sold, eliciting protests from local merchants and leading to O'Hara's name being used as a bogeyman to scare children.

On 22 August 1775 African inhabitants of the Province of Senegambia sent a petition to London detailing alleged abuses by O'Hara. The petition claimed that O'Hara attempted to abolish the Catholic Church in the province, prevented Africans from receiving Catholic burials and arbitrarily sentenced house slaves and free people of colour to be sold into the Atlantic slave trade as a form of judicial punishment. O'Hara was also accused of insulting women, using racial slurs against Africans and seizing the property of free locals to use as a residence for Poole. Local residents "saw these actions as an affront to the normal customs of their society and a sign of the illegitimacy of British rule." O'Hara's encouragement and arming of raids into Futa Tooro contributed to the fall of the Empire of Great Fulo and the rise of the Imamate of Futa Toro in 1776.

Ultimately the Province of Senegambia was a disappointment for the British government and O'Hara proved largely uninterested in civil governance. Despite the province's constitution offering generous rights to prospective settlers very few British colonists ever came to West Africa. O'Hara stopped serving as governor in 1776 and during the American War of Independence French forces captured the Province of Senegambia in May 1779. The region would ultimately be ceded to France at the Peace of Paris in 1783.

== American War of Independence ==
In July 1778, Lt. Col. O'Hara arrived in America and immediately commanded forces at Sandy Hook, New Jersey. Lt. Gen. Henry Clinton, commander of the British army in America, gave him that assignment as the French fleet under Charles Henri Hector, Count of Estaing threatened New York City.

In October 1780, O'Hara was promoted to brigadier and became commander of Brigade of Guards. He became Lieutenant General Charles Cornwallis' second-in-command and good friend. During Cornwallis' pursuit of Major general Nathanael Greene to the Dan River, O'Hara distinguished himself at Cowan's Ford, North Carolina on 1 February 1781. He also led the British counterattack at the Battle of Guilford Courthouse on 15 March 1781, which led to General Greene withdrawing from the field of battle. He was severely wounded during this battle, but was able to remain with the army as it moved toward Yorktown, Virginia. His nephew, who was a lieutenant of the artillery, was killed during the battle.

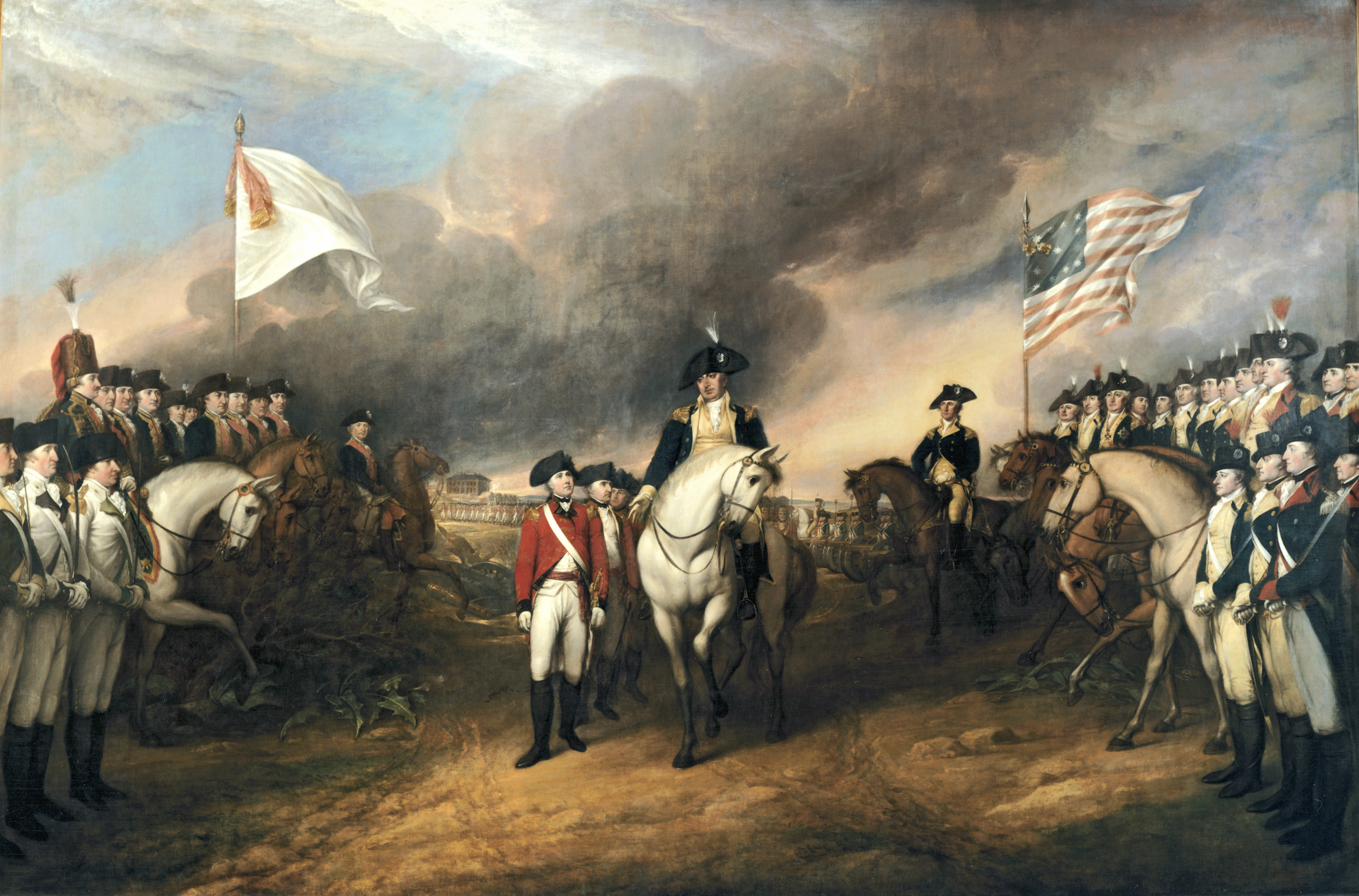
O'Hara surrendering to Benjamin Lincoln on 19 October 1781

General O'Hara represented the British at the surrender of Yorktown on 19 October 1781, as Cornwallis' adjutant, when the latter pleaded illness. He first attempted to surrender to French Comte de Rochambeau, who declined his sword and deferred to General George Washington. Washington declined and deferred to Major General Benjamin Lincoln, who was serving as Washington's second-in-command and had surrendered to General Clinton at Charleston in May 1780. O'Hara is depicted in the painting The Surrender of Lord Cornwallis by John Trumbull.

O'Hara was exchanged on 9 February 1782, and was sent to the Caribbean in command of a detachment of reinforcements. Following the conclusion of the war with the Treaty of Paris he returned to Britain having been promoted to major general.

In 1784, O'Hara fled from England to the Continent due to gambling debts. While in Italy he met the writer Mary Berry and began a long relationship with her. After Cornwallis offered him help in paying off his debts, he was able to return to Britain. When Cornwallis was made Governor General of India in 1786 he offered to take O'Hara with him, but he declined. On 1 April 1791 he transferred from the 22nd Regiment of Foot to be Colonel in Chief of the 74th (Highland) Regiment of Foot. In 1792, he was appointed lieutenant governor of Gibraltar at the rank of Lt. General.

== Toulon ==
In 1793, he was promoted to lieutenant-general. On 23 November 1793, he was captured at Fort Mulgrove in Toulon, France during operations that gained Napoleon the attention of his superiors. On the tenth of the same month, Napoleon marched to the siege of Toulon, to retake the hill of Arènes of which Anglo-Neapolitan forces had momentarily taken possession. In this struggle, Napoleon captured O'Hara, who laid down his arms to Napoleon's staff. O'Hara had been leading a bold sortie by the besieged British troops. Napoleon was personally directing the capture operation and accepted O'Hara's formal surrender. O'Hara was treated as an "insurrectionist" and was imprisoned in the Luxembourg Prison and threatened with the guillotine. In the Luxembourg he and his retinue formed a very companionable relationship with a fellow prisoner, the Anglo-American revolutionary, Thomas Paine. O'Hara spent two years in prison in Paris.

O'Hara thus has the distinction of having been the only person personally taken prisoner by both George Washington and Napoleon Bonaparte.

== Later years ==
In August 1795, he was exchanged for Comte de Rochambeau. Later that year he became engaged to Mary Berry, but the engagement was broken when he was named Governor of Gibraltar for a second time on 30 December 1795, and she would not leave England. He was promoted to full general in 1798. O'Hara is known for the folly that was O'Hara's Tower on Gibraltar and his debates with John Jervis, 1st Earl of St Vincent over the redesign of Gibraltar to serve the needs of the British Fleet. St Vincent, who was admiral in charge of the Mediterranean Fleet, recommended that the Royal Navy Victualling Yard be relocated to the Rosia Bay area, just south of the New Mole. Governor O'Hara did not approve of St Vincent's plan as he proposed to finance it by selling the naval stores at Waterport and Irish Town. However, St Vincent had poor regard for O'Hara, who let the garrison enjoy the ninety pubs on the Rock. It has been proposed that he needed the income to finance his many households and mistresses. St Vincent, however, won with regard to his navy's needs. The poor morale in the garrison led to a plot to let Spain have Gibraltar. O'Hara discovered the plot and 1,000 people were exiled from the Rock.

He died in Gibraltar on 21 February 1802, from complications due to his old wounds and was buried on 25 February.

== In popular culture ==
In the Roland Emmerich film The Patriot starring Mel Gibson, Charles O'Hara was played by Peter Woodward. His portrayal in the film has been criticised. In the film O'Hara is portrayed to speak with received pronunciation which may be considered anachronistic, this manner of speaking did not yet exist. The real O'Hara is said to have spoken with an Irish accent and like many of his colleagues of the day, he shared in the hardships endured by the common soldiers under his command.

O'Hara was portrayed by Collin Sutton in the television show Turn: Washington's Spies.

John Means portrayed Brigadier General Charles O'Hara in the MGM miniseries George Washington in 1984.

== Bibliography ==
- Babits, Lawrence Edward & Howard, Joshua B. Long, Obstinate and Bloody: The Battle of Guilford Courthouse. University of North Carolina Press, 2009.
- Bicheno, Hugh. Redcoats and Rebels: The American Revolutionary War. Harper Collins, 2003.
- Boulegue, Jean (2013). Les royaumes wolof dans l'espace sénégambien (XIIIe-XVIIIe siècle). Paris: Karthala Editions.
- Fredriksen, John C. Revolutionary War Almanac. Infobase Publishing, 2006.

Military offices
Preceded by Hon. Thomas Gage	Colonel of the 22nd (Cheshire) Regiment; 1782–1791	Succeeded by David Dundas
Preceded by Sir Archibald Campbell	Colonel of the 74th (Highland) Regiment of Foot; 1791–1802	Succeeded by The Lord Hutchinson
Preceded by Charles Rainsford	Governor of Gibraltar; 1795–1802	Succeeded by Charles Barnett
