= Bénédict Chastanier =

French surgeon

Bénédict Chastanier (1739 – c. 1816) was a French surgeon. In 1767 he founded a lodge of Illuminés Theosophes, based on the anonymous writings of Emanuel Swedenborg. In 1774 he migrated to England. In 1775 Chastanier and the Marquis de Thorn joined the Philaléthes, a Masonic society founded by Savalette de Langes in Paris. In 1776 he founded Universal Society in London to disseminate Swedenborg's writing. In 1782 Chastanier and Charles Rainsford reached out to kindred Illuminist groups in Berlin and Paris by publishing a brochure in French about degrees of the Universal Society. Chastanier was in contact with the Illuminés of Avignon.
