= St Catherine's Court =

Grade I listed manor house in Bath and North East Somerset, United Kingdom

Coordinates: 51.4304°N 2.3210°W

St Catherines Court
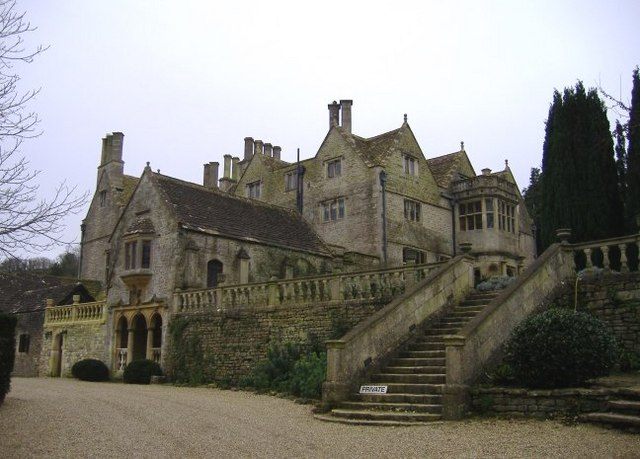
- St Catherine's Court.

- Location within Somerset
- Location: St Catherine, Somerset, England

History
- Built: 16th century
- Built for: William Blanchard

Listed Building – Grade I
- Official name: St. Catherine's Court
- Designated: 1 February 1956
- Reference no.: 1232265

St Catherine's Court is a manor house in a secluded valley north of Bath, Somerset, England. It is a Grade I listed property. The gardens are Grade II* listed on the Register of Historic Parks and Gardens of special historic interest in England.

The original house was a priory grange for the monks of Bath Abbey adjacent to the Church of St Catherine. At the Dissolution of the Monasteries, the manor was granted to John Malte and passed down to the courtier John Harington. It was bought in 1591 by John Blanchard and housed his descendants for generations, but the property fell into disrepair. In the 19th century, the house was bought by Colonel Joseph Holden Strutt who renovated it, with the work being continued by his sons. In 1984, actress Jane Seymour bought the house and carried out further renovation. During her ownership, the property was used as a recording studio and party venue, which caused complaints among the neighbours. It has since been further extended and has been now rented out as a wedding venue, though it is currently for sale.

The fabric of the building has changed over the centuries with a two-storey porch being added in 1610. Further extensions were added in the early 19th century, and the orangery and library were added in the early 20th century. In the 21st century, another addition including a swimming pool was added. The house is surrounded by 4 hectares (9.9 acres) of landscaped grounds with terraces joined by flights of steps. The barn within the grounds is from the 13th to 15th centuries.

== History ==
The manor of St Catherine belonged to Prior Cantlow of Bath Abbey in medieval times. It takes its name from the Church of St Catherine beside the manor house. When the house was not occupied by the monks, it was leased. In 1536, the lease was to Thomas Llewellyn, who remained as the tenant after the Dissolution of the Monasteries. Henry VIII granted the manor to his tailor, John Malte, in 1546. Part of the condition of the gift was that he adopt the king's illegitimate daughter Ethelreda Malte. Ethelreda inherited the house and married John Harington. After Ethelreda's death in 1551, Harington married again. His son from this marriage was another John Harington who grew up and became a courtier of Elizabeth I and invented the first flush toilet. He spent most of his time at his principal seat at nearby Kelston and, in 1591, sold St Catherine's Court to John Blanchard. His son, William Blanchard, remodelled the house. His initials appear in the plasterwork frieze of a bedroom. The Blanchard family lived at the court for several generations. Nearby Batheaston House was later built for Henry Walters, who, according to Historic England, succeeded to the property of Bath Easton and St Catherine through his grandfather, Henry Blanchard. In 1610, the porch was added and a terraced garden laid out. The house passed by marriage to the Parry family but was not maintained, and the fabric of the building was declining by the 18th century, when half of the building was used by a tenant farmer. The house passed by marriage to the Parry family but was not maintained, and the fabric of the building was declining by the 18th century, when half of the building was used by a tenant farmer.

The house was bought by Colonel Joseph Holden Strutt, a British soldier and long-standing Member of Parliament. He renovated the house and neighbouring church. He extended the house before his death in 1845. His youngest daughter Charlotte Olivia inherited the house and lived there with her husband, the Reverend Robert Drummond, until her death in 1897. In 1912, it was inherited by Richard Strutt, the youngest son of the second Baron Rayleigh. Richard Strutt added an orangery and built the library based on designs by Charles Bateman. In addition, he joined the ruined chapel near the gate to the rest of the house. The house was then inherited by his son, John Strutt.

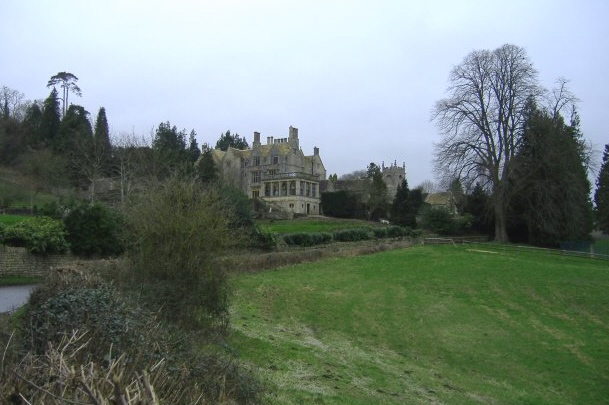
The house in 2007

In 1984, actress Jane Seymour bought the house with her then husband David Flynn for £350,000. After spending £3 million on refurbishments, they undertook renovation of the house. They brought purchased furniture from Littlecote House, owned by Sir Seton Wills, as he was selling his house and there was little furniture at St Catherine's. Seymour spent summers at the house. After her divorce from Flynn and marriage to American film producer James Keach, Seymour rented out the manor as a film set, recording studio and latterly country house estate/hotel for corporate events and weddings. The English band The Cure recorded their album Wild Mood Swings there in 1994 and 1995. The band came back in the autumn of 1998 to record most of their 2000 album Bloodflowers. Radiohead recorded most of their 1997 album OK Computer there. New Order also recorded part of their 2005 album Waiting for the Sirens' Call and the unreleased 2013 track Lost Sirens at St Catherine's Court. The property was also rented by Robbie Williams, as seen in the first episode of MTV Cribs. In May 2007, Seymour was granted a 24-hour alcohol and entertainment licence under new UK regulations, by Bath and North East Somerset council. Neighbours complained that the access lane was too narrow and the noise excessive. Seymour won the court battle, but sold the house in November 2007 to an unknown buyer. In 2009, a planning application for a two-storey extension, including a swimming pool was submitted to the local council. This was on the site of a previous orchard from which the trees were transplanted. In the 2020s house was made available for catered rental and weddings and was advertised for sale in 2025 with an asking price of £12.5 million.

== Architecture ==
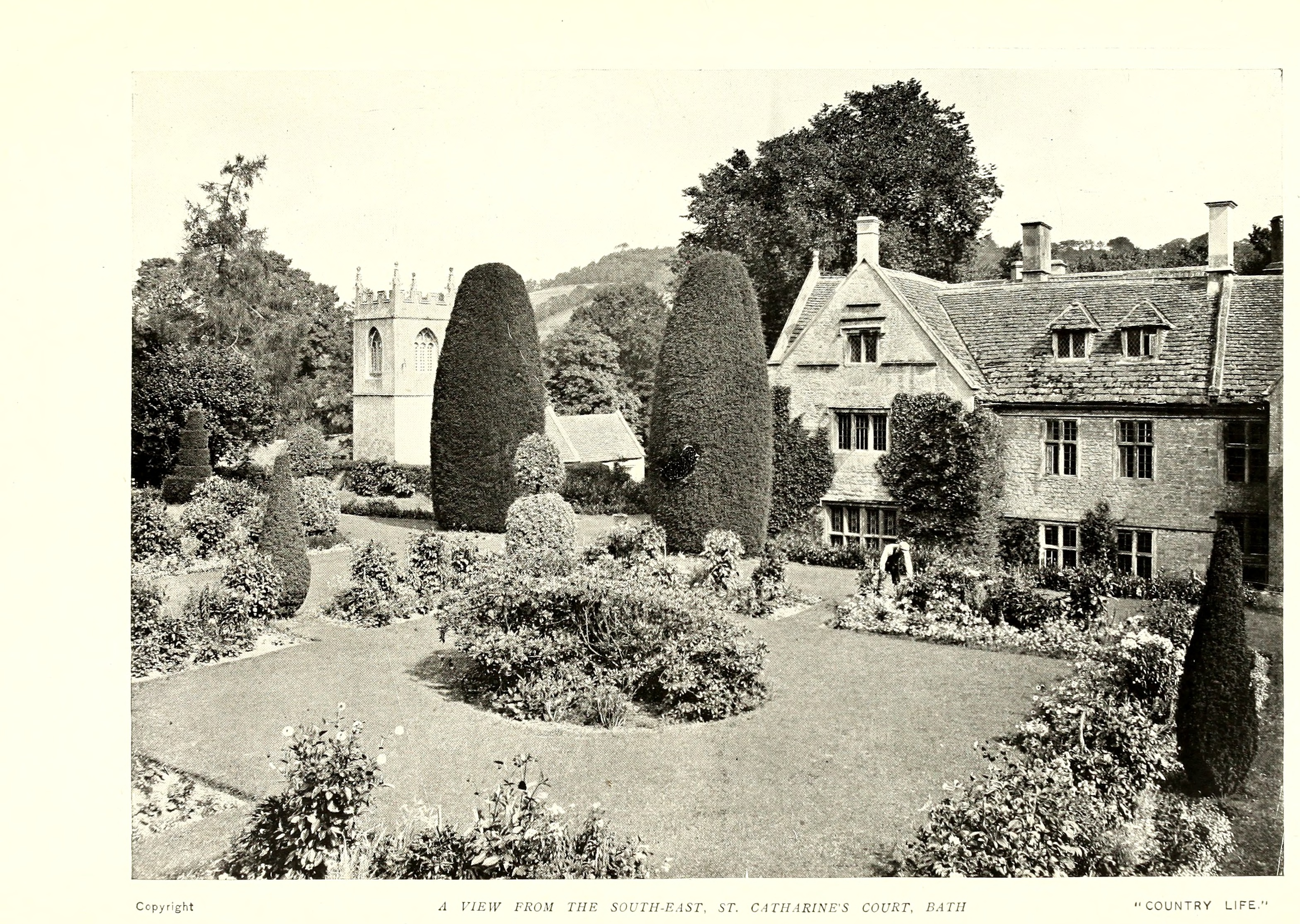
The garden in 1900

The oldest part of the house, the north front, was built in the Elizabethan era but incorporates parts of the earlier priory grange on the site. The front has sloping gables which reduce the load on the walls beneath them. The porch which was added in 1610 has tuscan columns supporting a balustrade with a statue of "Bungey", a favourite spaniel of John Harrington. It leads into a passage and the "oak room" which has wooden panelling with a moulded ceiling and 17th century fireplace. Similar features can be found in the hall and dining room. The ceiling of the library is an imitation of that at Audley End House, while the woodwork is mostly Jacobean. The staircase to the bedrooms incorporates the base of a tree trunk growing under the house.

The 4 hectares (9.9 acres) gardens and grounds and laid out in terraces and include a paved court with an octagonal pool and separate areas enclosed by clipped yew hedges. More recent landscaping to the south of the house is in an Italianate style with pergolas. The barn within the grounds was probably built between the 13th and 15th centuries. In 2008 proposals were submitted to turn the barn into offices and a workshop.

Many of the walls and structures within the gardens, such as the central flight of steps, were built in the late 17th century. The gatepiers and flanking walls north east of the house were added in the mid 19th century. The gardens are Grade II* listed on the Register of Historic Parks and Gardens of special historic interest in England.

== Hymn tune ==
In 1925, Richard Strutt composed the hymn tune St Catherine's Court as a setting for the christian hymn "In Our Day of Thanksgiving". It was in the Jubilee Hymn Book of the Girls' Friendly Society for their golden jubilee. The hymn was later published with this tune in the 1950 edition of Hymns Ancient and Modern.

== Bibliography ==
- Cooke, Robert (1957). West Country Houses. Batsford.
- Greenwood, Charles (1977). Famous houses of the West Country. Bath: Kingsmead Press. ISBN 978-0-901571-87-8.
