= Sir John Coghill, 1st Baronet of Richings =

British Army officer and politician

Sir John Coghill, 1st Baronet (died 1785), also known as John Mayne, was a British Army officer and Tory politician.

== Biography ==
Born John Mayne, he assumed the surname of Coghill upon his marriage to Hester Coghill, an heiress and daughter of James Coghill and niece of Marmaduke Coghill.

He was a cornet in the 14th Regiment of Dragoons in 1734, a captain in 1754 and a major 1766. His name had disappeared from the Army lists by 1771. Between 1780 and his death he represented Newport in the House of Commons. He was elected unopposed on the interest of the Duke of Northumberland. In May 1784 he was classed as a Pittite. There is no record of his having spoken in the House of Commons.

He was created a baronet, of Richings in the Baronetage of Great Britain on 24 March 1781. He died without issue at which point the title became extinct.

Escutcheon of the Coghill baronets of Richings

Parliament of Great Britain
Preceded by John Frederick; Richard Bull	Member of Parliament for Newport; 1780–1785; With: Robert Butler	Succeeded by John Riggs Miller; William Mitford
Baronetage of Great Britain
New creation	Baronet (of Richings); 1781–1785	Extinct
Preceded by André baronets	Coghill baronets of Richings; 24 March 1781	Succeeded by Ingilby baronets
