= William Feilding, Viscount Feilding =

British Army officer and politician (1760–1799)

Major-General William Robert Feilding, Viscount Feilding (15 June 1760 – 8 August 1799) was a British Army officer and politician. He was the eldest son of Basil Feilding, 6th Earl of Denbigh, but died a year before his father, leaving a son, William Feilding, 7th Earl of Denbigh.

Parliament of Great Britain
Preceded by Lord Algernon Percy; The Lord Macartney	Member of Parliament for Bere Alston; 1780–1790; With: The Lord Macartney 1780–1781; Laurence Cox 1781–1784; The Earl of Mornington 1784–1787; Charles Rainsford 1787–1788; John Mitford 1788–1790	Succeeded by Sir George Beaumont, Bt; John Mitford
Preceded by Sir John Riggs Miller; William Mitford	Member of Parliament for Newport; 1790–1796; With: Charles Rainsford	Succeeded by William Northey; Joseph Richardson
