= Colin G. Maggs =

Railway historian (born 1932)

Colin Gordon Maggs (born 1932) is a railway historian, author and retired teacher. His books are generally about the history of rail transport in Great Britain, particularly those in the South West England.

== Professional career ==
He trained for teaching at Westminster College, Oxford, Horseferry Road, London SW, from 1952 to 1954. He became the deputy headmaster of Batheaston Church of England school in 1967. He still lives in the area in Bath, Somerset.

== Railway historian ==
He was awarded an MBE in 1993 for services to railway history and an honorary MA from the University of Bath in 1995.

== Bibliography (partial) ==
- Bristol Port Railway and Pier (Oakwood Library of Railway History) (1975)
- East Somerset Railway, 1858-1972 (1977)
- Bath to Weymouth Line (Locomotion Papers) (1982)
- Honeybourne Line (1985)
- Birmingham to Gloucester Line (1986)
- The Barnstaple and Ilfracombe Railway (Locomotion Papers) (1988)
- The Calne Branch (1990)
- The Last Years of the Somerset & Dorset (1991)
- Branch Lines of Wiltshire (Transport/Railway) (1992)
- The Bath Tramways (Locomotion Papers) (1992)
- The Last Days of Steam in Bristol and Somerset (1992)
- Sidmouth and Budleigh Salterton Branches (Locomotion Papers) (1996)
- The Exeter and Exmouth Railway (Locomotion Papers) (1997)
- Minehead Branch and West Somerset Railway (Locomotion Papers) (1998)
- Steam: Tales from the Footplate (2000)
- The Nailsworth and Stroud Branch (Locomotion Papers) (2000)
- The Bristol to Bath Line (2001)
- The Yate to Thornbury Branch (Locomotion Papers) (2002)
- Rail Centres: Exeter No. 5 (2005)
- Culm Valley Light Railway: Tiverton Junction to Hemyock (Locomotion Papers) (2006)
- Swindon (Rail Centres) (2007)
- Bristol (Rail Centres) (2008)
- Britain's Railways in Colour: BR Steam in the 1950s and 1960s (2009)
- Bristol & Bath Railways (2011)
- Britain's Railways in Colour: BR Diesels in the 1960s and 70s (2010)
- The Branch Lines of Buckinghamshire (2010)
- The Branch Lines of Warwickshire (2011)
- The Minehead Branch and the West Somerset Railway (Locomotion Papers) (2011)
- The Branch Lines of Gloucestershire (2011)
- The Branch Lines of Dorset (2012)
- A History of the Great Western Railway (2013)
