= Church of the Good Shepherd, Batheaston =

Catholic Church in Somerset, England

Church of the Good Shepherd
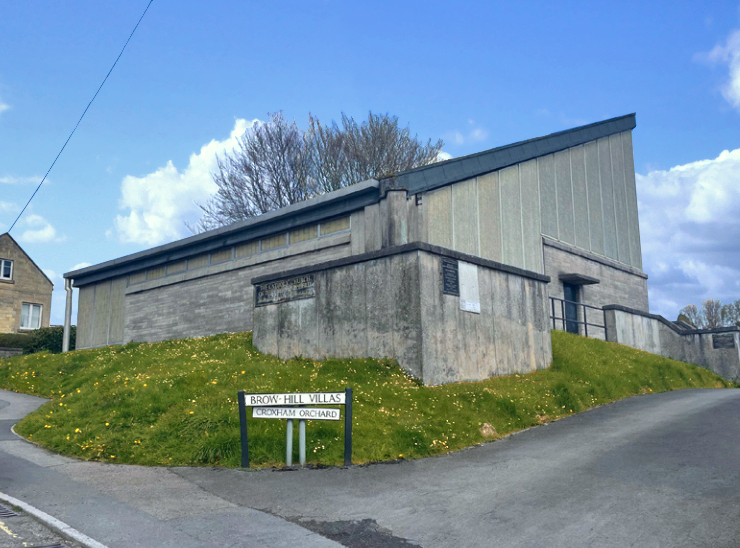

Religion
- Affiliation: Roman Catholic
- Ecclesiastical or organizational status: Closed

Location
- Location: Batheaston, Somerset, England
- Interactive map of Church of the Good Shepherd
- Coordinates: 51.4063°N 2.3199°W

Architecture
- Architect: Martin Fisher
- Type: Church
- Style: Brutalist
- Completed: 1967
- Capacity: 280

The Church of the Good Shepherd is a former Roman Catholic church in Batheaston, Somerset, England. Designed by Martin Fisher in the Brutalist architecture style, it was built between 1966 and 1967 and closed as a place of worship in 2020. Planning permission was granted in 2025 to demolish the church, but a new planning application in June 2026 proposes to convert the building into offices and a children's nursery.

== History ==
Catholic worship in Batheaston was originally held in the chapel of the St. Joseph's Roman Catholic Approved School at Eagle House. The school moved to Batheaston in 1941, following bomb damage to their premises in the Arnos Vale area of Bristol. Services were then held in an upper room of the village's Lamb and Flag Inn in December 1947. Following discussions between the Bishop of Clifton, Rev. William Lee, and the Rector of Our Lady Help of Christians (St Mary's) in Bath, Dr. J. Grimshaw, a temporary church was erected in 1948 to serve Batheaston until a permanent one could be built. The £1,000 temporary church, dedicated to St. Euphrasia, was a converted ex-army hut capable of seating 100 people. It was blessed and dedicated for worship by the Rector of St Mary's, Dr. J. A. Rea, with assistance from Father McCarron, on 16 May 1948.

Construction of a permanent church, the Church of the Good Shepherd, commenced in April 1966 and was completed in May 1967. It was designed by the architect Martin Fisher of Bath and cost approximately £40,000 to build. The church was opened by the Bishop of Clifton, Rev. Joseph Rudderham, on 4 May 1967. The roof was renewed circa 1991 and a reordering was carried out under Martin Fisher in the 2000s, which included the installation of new stone furnishings in the sanctuary.

=== Closure and redevelopment proposals (2020–2026) ===
Due to the COVID-19 pandemic, the church temporarily closed as a place of worship from March 2020 and was replaced by daily livestreamed services from St John's Church, Bath, and Clifton Cathedral. However, due to its declining number of worshippers, the Diocese decided it was not viable to reopen the church. The Diocese then sought planning permission for a redevelopment scheme in October 2023, which opted for the church's demolition and replacement with four houses.

Historic England assessed the church for listing in December 2023 and again in April 2024, but concluded it did not meet the criteria. They noted that it was an "interesting example of its type, with some notable architectural features", including the "striking, tent-like roof form and imaginative use of fibre-glass blocks", but felt the "variable success of the design" did not meet the standards for listing. Bath and North East Somerset Council designated the church a locally listed heritage asset in 2024.

After receiving feedback from numerous consultees and members of the public, revised designs were submitted in 2024. The planning consultants, on behalf of the Diocese, stated that alternative uses for the church were unviable and demolition remained the "most sensible route". Both the original and revised plans drew opposition from local people, but planning permission was granted in July 2025. It was put up for sale in January 2026 as a 'development opportunity'. A planning application submitted in June 2026 seeks to retain the building, with the upper floor providing a 75-place day nursery and the lower floor used as offices by a building firm.

== Architecture ==
The square-shaped church is a single-storey building, with a parish hall at basement level. It is largely built of untreated narrow concrete blocks. The sloping roof, originally built with sheet copper, is flat on the west side and rises diagonally on the east side over the south-east sanctuary. The main entrance on the north-west side is a small flat-roofed narthex while an external staircase provides access to another entrance on the south-east side. A windowless projection at the south-west corner contains a confessional.

The church has a seated capacity of 280 and these are arranged in a radial plan around the corner sanctuary. Much of the church's lighting is provided by blocks of Kalwall fibreglass. Double layers of coloured fibreglass, which appear opaque from the exterior, were used in the sanctuary instead of traditional stained glass. Internal fittings include a stone altar and ambo, designed by Martin Fisher and installed in the early 2000s. Near the sanctuary is a small oriel window with blue glass, which contains a concrete sculpture of the Virgin and Child. There are also statues of St Thomas More and St John Fisher in the church's north and south corners, and the baptistery in the west corner has a cylindrical stone font.
