= Anna, Lady Miller =

English poet and travel writer

Anna, Lady Miller (née Riggs; 1741 – 24 June 1781) was an English poet, travel writer, heiress and salon hostess.

== Biography ==
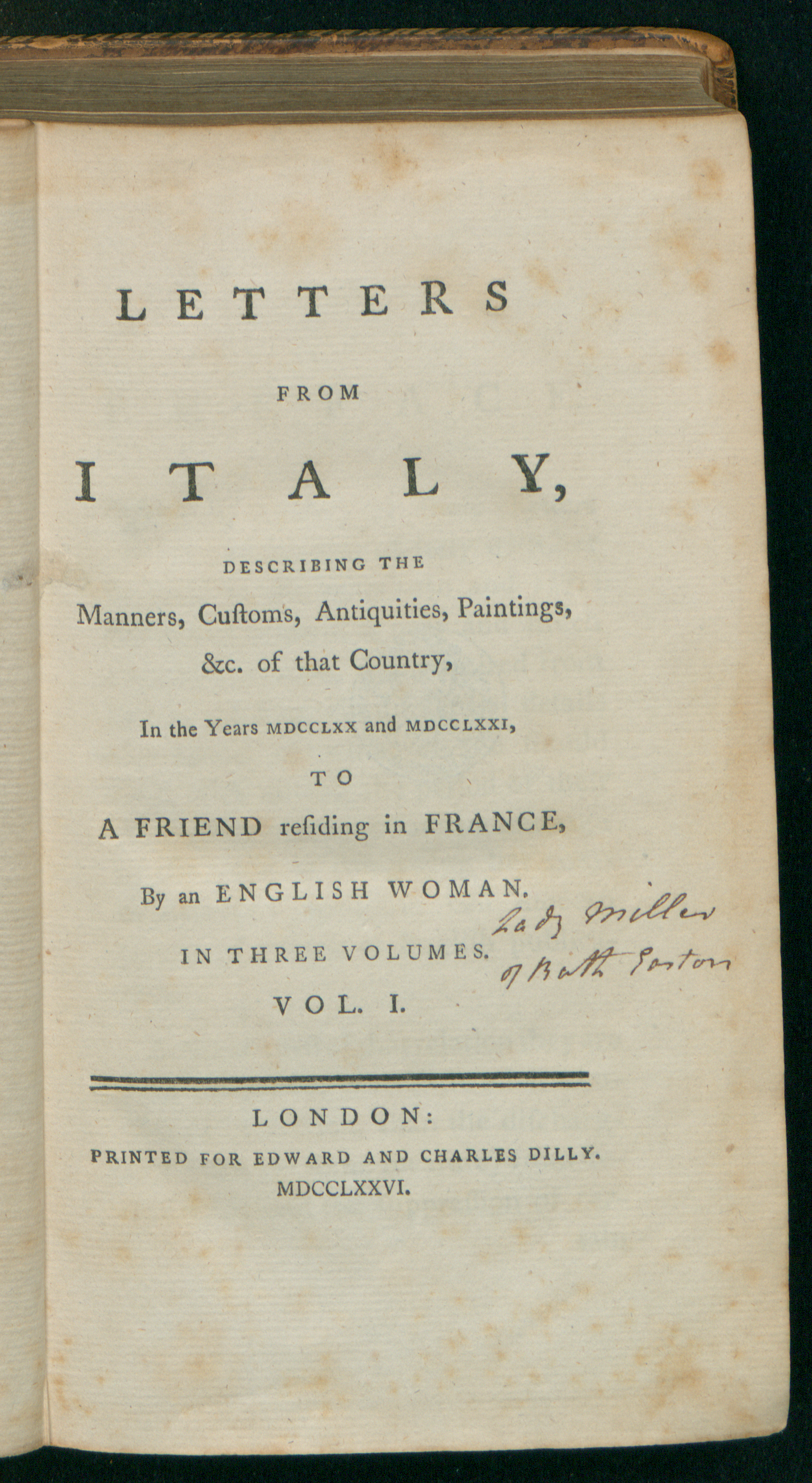
Letters from Italy (1776)

Anna was the daughter of Edward Riggs, by his wife, Margaret Pigott, of the historic house of Chetwynd, Shropshire. Her grandfather, Edward Riggs, had been a member of the Irish House of Commons, a commissioner of revenue, and a Privy Councillor in Ireland, and Anna inherited much of his wealth. Her father became a commissioner of customs in London in 1741. Horace Walpole described Anna's mother in 1765 as an old rough humourist, who passed for a wit. Fanny Burney characterised her as mighty merry and facetious.

In 1765 Anna married John Miller, a member of a poor Irish family seated at Ballicasey, County Clare. Miller had served through the Seven Years' War, but resigned his commission at the peace of 1763. Anna brought him a large fortune, and he adopted her maiden surname before his own. At extravagant cost he built a house at Batheaston, near Bath, and laid out a garden, of which Walpole gave a detailed description.

However, the expense of the couple's lifestyle soon demanded that they economise and they moved to France and made a tour of the Italian antiquities. In 1776 Anna's lively letters sent to a friend during her travels were published anonymously in three volumes. A second edition, in two volumes, appeared in 1777. The book did enjoy some success but Walpole's opinion was that "The poor Arcadian patroness does not spell one word of French or Italian right through her three volumes of travel".

John Miller became a baronet in 1778 and Anna became Lady Miller. She instituted a fortnightly literary salon at her villa. Lee characterised the salon as bearing "some resemblance to the later follies of the Della Cruscans". In Italy, Lady Miller had purchased an antique vase, dug up at Frascati in 1759. The vase was placed on an "altar" decorated with laurel, and each guest was invited to place in the urn an original composition in verse. A committee was appointed to determine the best three productions, and their authors were then crowned by Lady Miller with wreaths of myrtle. The practice was continued until Lady Miller's death. The urn was then purchased by Edwyn Dowding, of Bath, and placed by him in the public park of the town. The society became famous, and was much laughed at. Anthony Morris Storer, writing to George Selwyn, observed, "Their next subject is upon Trifles and Triflers. Edward Drax was one of the attendees at the soirees and he and Miller were satirised in an article in the Morning Post in 1778:

Tho' sceptics doubt at Bath we know / That Chance not Order, reign below, / Else why 'gainst Sense and Nature's rule, / Does M-LL-R keep the Muses School? / Chance too, Oh! DR-X, makes thee a poet: /Who read they verse must surely know it

— Anon, Newspaper article in Morning Post quoted in the source below, Edwards, Brian (2003) 'Imagining Silbury and Parnassus the same; Edward Drax and the Batheaston Vase Adventure', The Regional Historian, issue 26, Winter/Spring, pp.21-26.

You may try your hand at an ode, and I do not doubt but you may be crowned with myrtle for your performance". Walpole, in a letter to Henry Seymour Conway, said, "I am glad you went [to Bath], especially as you escaped being initiated into Mrs. Miller's follies at Bath-Easton." Fanny Burney, while on a visit to Bath in 1780, was introduced to Lady Miller by Hester Thrale, and wrote, "Nothing here is more tonish than to visit Lady Miller. She is a round, plump, coarse-looking dame of about forty, and while all her aim is to appear an elegant woman of fashion, all her success is to seem an ordinary woman in very common life, with fine clothes on."

A selection of the compositions was published in 1775. The edition was sold out within ten days and a new edition appeared in 1776 with a second volume of poems. Walpole called the book a bouquet of artificial flowers, and ten degrees duller than a magazine. A third volume was published in 1777, and a fourth in 1781. The profits of the sale were donated to charity. Among the contributors were the Duchess of Northumberland, who wrote on a buttered muffin, Lord Palmerston, Lord Carlisle, Christopher Anstey, William Mason, David Garrick, Anna Seward, and Lady Miller herself, to whom most of the writers paid extravagant compliments.

Samuel Johnson held the collection in high contempt. Sir Walter Scott believed that Seward's talents were discovered by Lady Miller, and Seward acknowledged her help in her Poem to the Memory of Lady Miller. Besides the works already mentioned, a volume by Lady Miller entitled On Novelty, and on Trifles and Triflers, appeared in 1778.

Lady Miller died on 24 June 1781, at the Hot Wells, Bristol, and was buried in the Abbey Church, Bath. On her monument, designed by John Bacon and erected in 1785, there is an epitaph in verse, composed by Seward. She left two children, a son and a daughter.

== Family ==
Sir John Riggs Miller, who inherited his wife's fortune, married, after 1786, the widow of Sir Thomas Davenport. He sat in parliament for a time and settling in Bloomsbury Square, he became known in London society as an inveterate gossip and newsmonger, and was a well-known figure in many London clubs. He died suddenly on 28 May 1798, and was succeeded in the baronetcy by his son by his first marriage, John Edward Augustus Miller (1770–1825).

== Sources ==
- Jesse, J. H. (1902). Memoirs of George Selwyn and His Contemporaries. Vol. 3. Boston: L. C. Page & Co. p. 266.
