= Andrew Strahan =

British politician and printer

Andrew Strahan (1749–1831) was an MP and printer who served as the King's Printer.

== Biography ==
Andrew Strahan was the youngest son of William Strahan (1715–1785), and carried on his father's business with success, becoming one of the joint patentees, with John Reeves and George Eyre as the King's Printer. He retired in 1819. Between 1796 and 1820 he sat in Parliament successively for Newport, Wareham, Carlow, Aldeburgh, and New Romney.

Strahan died on 25 August 1831; he bequeathed £1,000 to the Royal Literary Fund, and £1,225 to the Stationers' Company.

== Sources ==
- Cochrane, J. A., Dr Johnson's Printer : The Life of William Strahan, 1964

Attribution

This article incorporates text from a publication now in the public domain: Seccombe, Thomas (1898). "Strahan, William". In Lee, Sidney (ed.). Dictionary of National Biography. Vol. 55. London: Smith, Elder & Co. pp. 17–18, see para 5.

Parliament of Great Britain
Preceded by Jervoise Clarke Jervoise; Edward Rushworth	Member of Parliament for Newport (Isle of Wight); 1796–1800; With: William Hamilton Nisbet 1796–1800; Sir George Dallas 1800	Succeeded by Parliament of the United Kingdom
Parliament of the United Kingdom
Preceded by Parliament of Great Britain	Member of Parliament for Newport (Isle of Wight); 1801–1802; With: Sir George Dallas	Succeeded by John Blackburn; Richard Gervas Ker
Preceded by Joseph Chaplin Hankey; John Calcraft	Member of Parliament for Wareham; 1802–1807; With: John Calcraft 1802–1806; Jonathan Raine 1806–1807	Succeeded by Sir Granby Calcraft; Hon. John Ward
Preceded by Hon. F. J. Robinson	Member of Parliament for Carlow; 1807–1812	Succeeded by Frederick Falkiner
Preceded by Sir John Aubrey; Sandford Graham	Member of Parliament for Aldeburgh; 1812–1818; With: The Lord Dufferin and Claneboye	Succeeded by Samuel Walker; Joshua Walker
Preceded by William Mitford; Cholmeley Dering	Member of Parliament for New Romney; 1818–1820; With: Richard Erle-Drax-Grosvenor 1818–1819; Richard Erle-Drax-Grosvenor 1819–1820	Succeeded by Richard Erle-Drax-Grosvenor; George Hay Dawkins-Pennant
