= Cholmeley Dering (died 1836) =

English politician

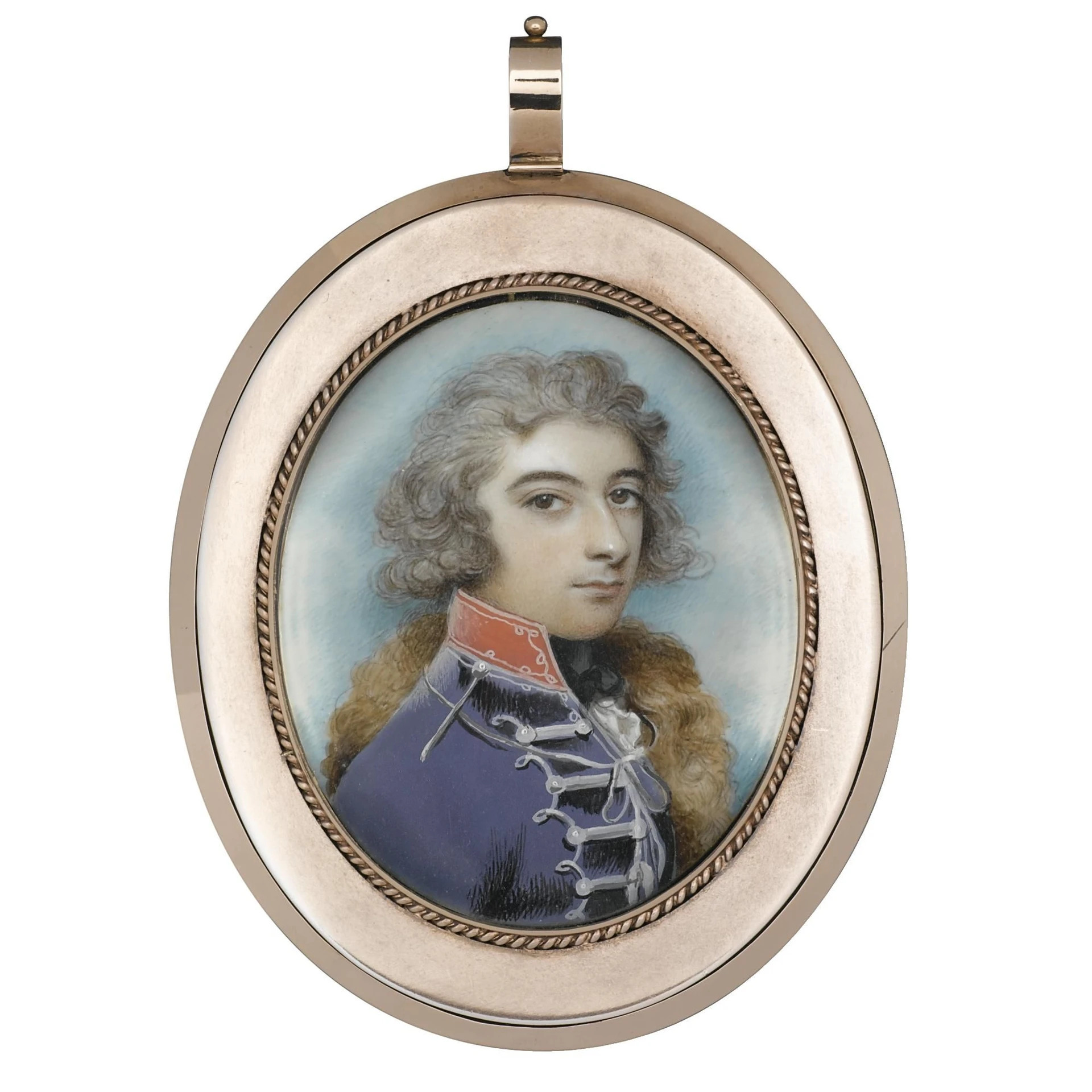
- portrait by Andrew Plimer
- Born: 25 October 1766
- Died: 7 November 1836 (aged 70)
- Occupation: Politician
- Spouse(s): Charlotte Elizabeth Yates
- Children: Cholmeley Edward John Dering
- Parent(s): Sir Edward Dering, 6th Baronet; Deborah Winchester

Cholmeley Dering (1766–1836), of Cavendish Square, Middlesex and Brighton, Sussex, was an English politician.

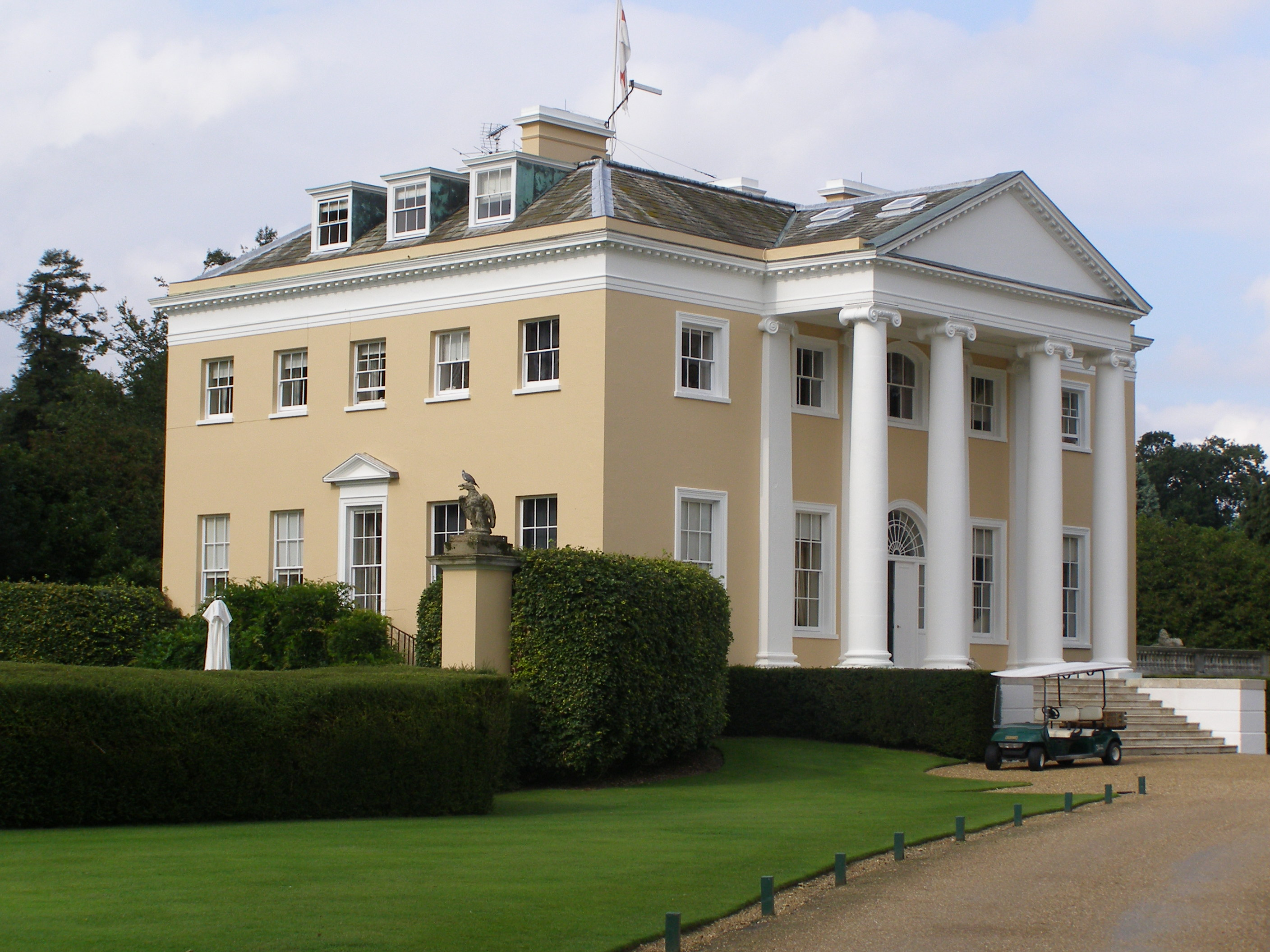
Howletts

== Family ==
He was the second son of Sir Edward Dering, 6th Baronet. In 1799 he bought the recently built Howletts near Canterbury, Kent from Isaac Baugh.

He married in 1789 Charlotte Elizabeth, the daughter of Sir Joseph Yates and had one son.

== Career ==
From 1794 he commanded a fencible regiment, the New Romsey corps of Fencible cavalry initially as major, later as lieutenant-colonel. He was a Member (MP) of the Parliament of the United Kingdom for New Romney 5 November 1817 - 1818.

Parliament of the United Kingdom
Preceded by Sir John Duckworth, Bt; William Mitford	Member of Parliament for New Romney; 1817 – 1818; With: William Mitford	Succeeded by Richard Erle-Drax-Grosvenor; Andrew Strahan
