= Richard Erle-Drax-Grosvenor (1762–1819) =

British politician (1762-1819)

Member of Parliament for East Looe
- In office 1786–1788 Serving with Alexander Irvine
- Preceded by: John Buller; Alexander Irvine
- Succeeded by: Viscount Belgrave; Alexander Irvine

Member of Parliament for Clitheroe
- In office 1794–1796 Serving with Sir John Aubrey, Bt
- Preceded by: Sir John Aubrey, Bt; Assheton Curzon
- Succeeded by: Lord Edward Bentinck; Hon. Robert Curzon

Member of Parliament for Chester
- In office 1802–1807 Serving with Thomas Grosvenor
- Preceded by: Viscount Belgrave; Thomas Grosvenor
- Succeeded by: Thomas Grosvenor; John Grey-Egerton

Member of Parliament for New Romney
- In office 1818–1819 Serving with Thomas Grosvenor
- Preceded by: William Mitford; Cholmeley Dering
- Succeeded by: Andrew Strahan; Richard Erle-Drax-Grosvenor

High Sheriff of Dorset
- In office 1800–1801
- Preceded by: Henry Seymour
- Succeeded by: Thomas Rose Drew

Personal details
- Born: 5 October 1762
- Died: 8 February 1819 (aged 56)
- Spouse: Frances Drax (m. 1788)
- Children: 3
- Parent: Thomas Grosvenor (father)
- Relatives: Sir Robert Grosvenor (paternal grandfather); Thomas Grosvenor (brother); Richard Erle-Drax-Grosvenor (son); John Erle-Drax (son-in-law)

Richard Erle-Drax-Grosvenor (born Grosvenor; 5 October 1762 – 8 February 1819) was a British politician.

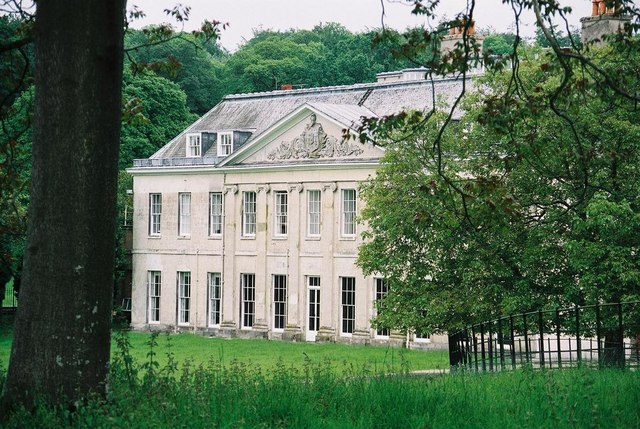
Charborough House, Dorset

Born a member of the Grosvenor family now headed by the Duke of Westminster, he was the son of Thomas Grosvenor, second son of Sir Robert Grosvenor, 6th Baronet. His mother was Deborah, daughter of Stephen Skynner, while Field Marshal Thomas Grosvenor was his younger brother.

Erle-Drax-Grosvenor was returned to parliament as one of two representatives for Clitheroe in 1794, a seat he held until 1796. In 1802 he was elected Member of Parliament for Chester (succeeding his younger brother Thomas), which constituency he represented until 1807. He returned once again to the House of Commons in 1818 when he was returned for New Romney, a seat he held until his death the following year. He was High Sheriff of Dorset for 1800–01.

Erle-Drax-Grosvenor died in February 1819, aged 56. He had married Frances, daughter and heiress of Edward Drax, of Charborough Park, Dorset, in 1788, and assumed the additional surnames of Erle-Drax on inheriting Charborough Park on the death of Edward Drax in 1791. They had a son and two daughters. His son, Richard, succeeded him as MP for New Romney.

Parliament of Great Britain
Preceded by John Buller; Alexander Irvine	Member of Parliament for East Looe; 1786–1788; With: Alexander Irvine	Succeeded by Viscount Belgrave; Alexander Irvine
Preceded by Sir John Aubrey, Bt; Assheton Curzon	Member of Parliament for Clitheroe; 1794–1796; With: Sir John Aubrey, Bt	Succeeded by Lord Edward Bentinck; Hon. Robert Curzon
Parliament of the United Kingdom
Preceded by Viscount Belgrave; Thomas Grosvenor	Member of Parliament for Chester; 1802–1807; With: Thomas Grosvenor	Succeeded by Thomas Grosvenor; John Grey-Egerton
Preceded by William Mitford; Cholmeley Dering	Member of Parliament for New Romney; 1818–1819; With: Andrew Strahan	Succeeded by Andrew Strahan; Richard Erle-Drax-Grosvenor
