= St Catherine, Somerset =

Civil parish in Somerset, England

Coordinates: 51.431°N 2.32°W

St Catherine
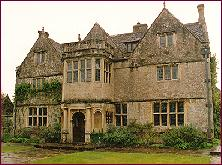
- St Catherine's Court

- Location within Somerset
- Population: 69
- OS grid reference: ST778702
- Unitary authority: Bath and North East Somerset
- Ceremonial county: Somerset
- Region: South West
- Country: England
- Sovereign state: United Kingdom
- Post town: BATH
- Postcode district: BA1
- Dialling code: 01225
- Police: Avon and Somerset
- Fire: Avon
- Ambulance: South Western
- UK Parliament: Bath

St Catherine is a dispersed settlement and civil parish in Bath and North East Somerset, England. It lies north of Batheaston and north-east of the city of Bath.

== Location ==
St Catherine is the closest settlement to the Three Shire Stones, which mark the point where South Gloucestershire, North East Somerset, and Wiltshire all meet, and which are about 1 mile (1.8 km) away. About 1 mile (2 km) up the valley are two Sites of Special Scientific Interest, St. Catherine's Valley and Monkswood Valley.

== History ==
St Catherine was part of the hundred of Bath Forum.

== Governance ==
The parish council has responsibility for local issues, including setting an annual precept (local rate) to cover the council's operating costs and producing annual accounts for public scrutiny. The parish council evaluates local planning applications and works with the local police, district council officers, and neighbourhood watch groups on matters of crime, security, and traffic. The parish council's role also includes initiating projects for the maintenance and repair of parish facilities, such as the village hall or community centre, playing fields and playgrounds, as well as consulting with the district council on the maintenance, repair, and improvement of highways, drainage, footpaths, public transport, and street cleaning. Conservation matters (including trees and listed buildings) and environmental issues are also of interest to the council. St Catherine's Parish Meeting is too small to be a traditional Parish Council. Often the Chair lives outside the parish.

The parish falls within the unitary authority of Bath and North East Somerset, created in 1996; South Gloucestershire when north of St Catherine's Brook. Before 1974 the parish was part of the Bathavon Rural District.

The parish is part of the Bath Parliamentary constituency. It was also part of the South West England constituency of the European Parliament prior to Britain leaving the European Union in January 2020.

== Religious sites ==
St Catherine's church was built in the 12th century as a chapel-of-ease of Bath. It is a Grade II* listed building. It stands within the grounds of the 16th century St Catherine's Court, which is Grade I listed.
