= George Hay Dawkins-Pennant =

British politician (1764–1840)

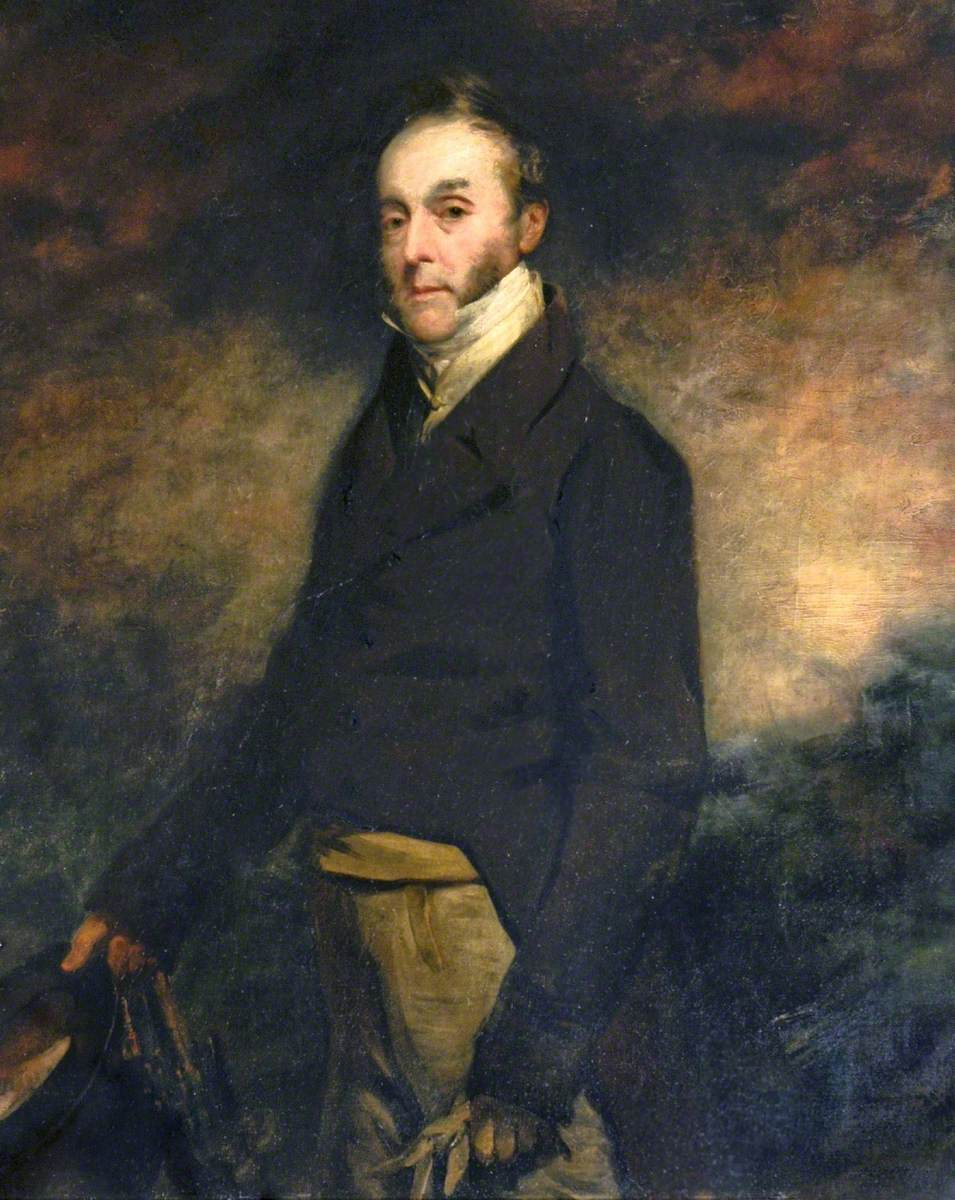
- A portrait of Dawkins-Pennant by John Jackson

Member of Parliament for Newark
- In office 1814–1818 Serving with Henry Willoughby
- Preceded by: Stapleton Cotton
- Succeeded by: William Henry Clinton

Member of Parliament for New Romney
- In office 1820–1830 Serving with Richard Erle-Drax-Grosvenor; George Tapps-Gervis
- Preceded by: Andrew Strahan
- Succeeded by: Arthur Hill-Trevor

Personal details
- Born: George Hay Dawkins; 20 February 1764 Penrhyn Castle, Llandygai
- Died: 17 December 1840 (aged 76) Great Britain
- Spouse(s): Sophia Mary Maude (m. 1807; died 1812) Elizabeth Bouverie (m. 1814)
- Children: 2
- Parent: Henry Dawkins (father)
- Relatives: Richard Pennant, 1st Baron Penrhyn (2nd cousin); Cornwallis Maude, 1st Viscount Hawarden (father-in-law); George Douglas-Pennant, 2nd Baron Penrhyn (grandson); William Henry Bouverie (father-in-law)

George Hay Dawkins-Pennant (born George Hay Dawkins; 20 February 1764 – 17 December 1840) was a British politician who represented Newark and New Romney in the House of Commons of the United Kingdom from 1814 to 1830.

== Early life ==
George Hay Dawkins was born on 20 February 1764 in Penrhyn Castle, Llandygai. He was the second son of politician Henry Dawkins, who owned slave plantations in the British colony of Jamaica, and his wife Lady Juliana Colyear. In 1807, Dawkins married Sophia Mary Maude, the daughter of Cornwallis Maude, 1st Viscount Hawarden. A year later, his second cousin Richard Pennant, 1st Baron Penrhyn died and left his estate to Dawkins, who changed his surname to Dawkins-Pennant to inherit it. In 1814, Henry died, leaving four sugar plantations and their slaves in Clarendon Parish, Jamaica to Dawkins-Pennant.

== Political career and death ==
In 1814, Dawkins-Pennant ran in a parliamentary by-election for the constituency of Newark after Sir Stapleton Cotton left the seat, and was elected to the House of Commons of the United Kingdom on 19 May. Dawkins-Pennant represented Newark until the 1818 United Kingdom general election, when he was replaced by Sir William Henry Clinton. In the 1820 United Kingdom general election, Dawkins-Pennant was again elected to the House of Commons representing New Romney until the 1830 general election.

Like Richard, Dawkins-Pennant was an advocate of proslavery thought, sitting on the pro-slavery West India Committee. After the Slavery Abolition Act 1833 abolished slavery in Jamaica, Dawkins-Pennant received compensation for the emancipation of the 650 slaves he owned under the Slave Compensation Act 1837. Best known for his development of the Penrhyn estates, he died immensely wealthy, leaving £600,000.

== Family ==
Dawkins-Pennant had two children with his first wife, Juliana Isabella Mary and Emma Elizabeth Alicia. In 1814, he married Elizabeth Bouverie, the daughter of William Henry Bouverie. Juliana married Colonel Edward Gordon Douglas in 1833. They had two children, of which eldest son George Sholto Gordon Douglas-Pennant succeeded his father in 1886 as the 2nd Baron Penrhyn.

Emma Elizabeth Alicia Dawkins-Pennant married in 1831 Thomas-Charles, Hanbury-Tracy, 2nd Baron Sudeley (d. 1863). He left £140,000. She had children with him and his successor, also Lord Sudeley.
