= Richard Erle-Drax-Grosvenor (1797–1828) =

British politician

Richard Edward Erle-Drax-Grosvenor (c. March 1797 – 18 August 1828), was a British politician.

A member of the Grosvenor family now headed by the Duke of Westminster, he was the son of Richard Erle-Drax-Grosvenor and Sarah Frances, daughter of Edward Drax, of Charborough House, Dorset. On his father's death in 1819 he succeeded him as Member of Parliament for New Romney, a seat he held until 1826.

Erle-Drax-Grosvenor inherited Charborough House through his mother. He died unmarried and a lunatic in August 1828, aged only 31. His sister Jane Frances Erle-Drax-Grosvenor inherited the estate. She married John Sawbridge, who assumed the surname of Erle-Drax in lieu of his patronymic.

Parliament of the United Kingdom
Preceded by Andrew Strahan; Richard Erle-Drax-Grosvenor	Member of Parliament for New Romney; 1819–1826; With: Andrew Strahan; George Dawkins-Pennant	Succeeded by George Dawkins-Pennant; George Tapps
