= Batheaston =

Village and civil parish in Somerset, England

Coordinates: 51°24′22″N 2°19′01″W

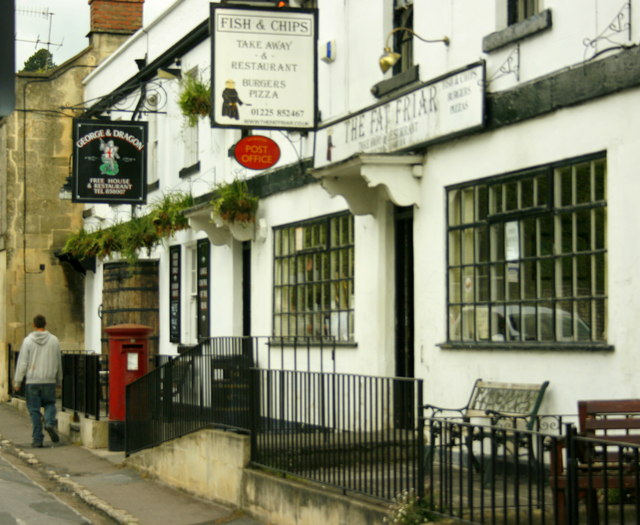

- Location within Somerset
- Population: 2,735
- OS grid reference: ST781674
- Unitary authority: Bath and North East Somerset
- Ceremonial county: Somerset
- Region: South West
- Country: England
- Sovereign state: United Kingdom
- Post town: BATH
- Postcode district: BA1
- Dialling code: 01225
- Police: Avon and Somerset
- Fire: Avon
- Ambulance: South Western
- UK Parliament: Bath

Batheaston is a village and civil parish 2 miles (3.2 km) east of the English city of Bath, on the north bank of the River Avon. The parish had a population of 2,735 in 2011. The northern area of the parish, on the road to St Catherine, is an area known as Northend.

Batheaston has been twinned with Oudon, France since 2005.

== History ==
Batheaston is named Estone in the 1086 Domesday Book, which recorded a population of 48 households.

Batheaston was part of the hundred of Bath Forum.

In the 16th century the Lord of the manor was John Hussey, 1st Baron Hussey of Sleaford.

In the 18th century, Sir John Riggs Miller, 1st Baronet and Anna, Lady Miller held a much-mocked fortnightly literary salon along with competitions and prizes at their house in the village. Distinguished contributions were received from the likes of David Garrick, Christopher Anstey and the poet Anna Seward.

== Governance ==
The parish council has responsibility for local issues, including setting an annual precept (local rate) to cover the council’s operating costs and producing annual accounts for public scrutiny. The parish council evaluates local planning applications and works with the local police, district council officers, and neighbourhood watch groups on matters of crime, security, and traffic. The parish council's role also includes initiating projects for the maintenance and repair of parish facilities, such as the village hall or community centre, playing fields and playgrounds, as well as consulting with the district council on the maintenance, repair, and improvement of highways, drainage, footpaths, public transport, and street cleaning. Conservation matters (including trees and listed buildings) and environmental issues are also of interest to the council.

The parish falls within the unitary authority of Bath and North East Somerset which was created in 1996, as established by the Local Government Act 1992. It provides a single tier of local government with responsibility for almost all local government functions within its area including local planning and building control, local roads, council housing, environmental health, markets and fairs, refuse collection, recycling, cemeteries, crematoria, leisure services, parks, and tourism. It is also responsible for education, social services, libraries, main roads, public transport, Trading Standards, waste disposal and strategic planning, although fire, police and ambulance services are provided jointly with other authorities through the Avon Fire and Rescue Service, Avon and Somerset Police and the Great Western Ambulance Service.

Bath and North East Somerset's area covers part of the ceremonial county of Somerset but it is administered independently of the non-metropolitan county. Its administrative headquarters are in Bath. Between 1 April 1974 and 1 April 1996, it was the Wansdyke district and the City of Bath of the county of Avon. Until 1974 the parish was part of the Bathavon Rural District.

The parish is represented in the House of Commons of the Parliament of the United Kingdom as part of the Bath constituency. It elects one Member of Parliament (MP) by the first past the post system of election.

== Geography ==
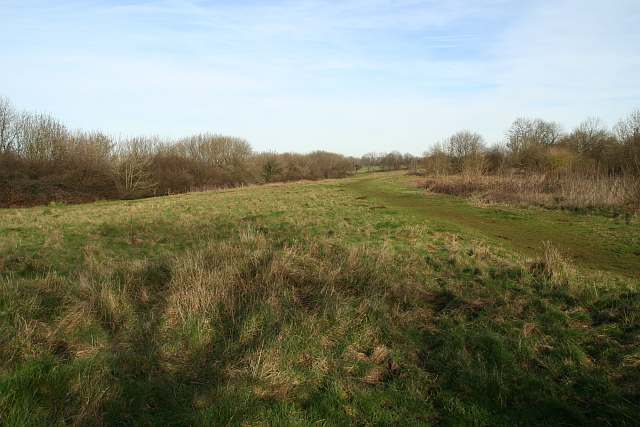
Bannerdown Common

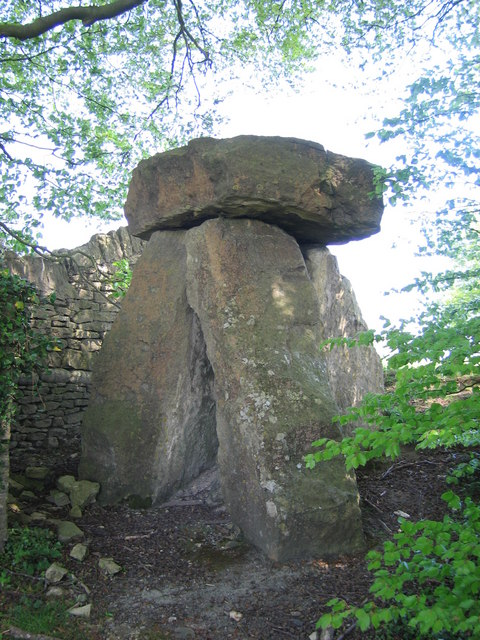
The Three Shire Stones

The village is overlooked by Solsbury Hill which is within the Cotswolds Area of Outstanding Natural Beauty and was an Iron Age hill fort, occupied between 300 BC and 100 BC. Batheaston is linked to Bathampton on the south bank of the river via a toll bridge, and also borders Bathford.

The Bybrook River, which springs up near Marshfield in Gloucestershire, flows through villages such as Castle Combe and Box in Wiltshire before joining the River Avon in Batheaston.

The Fosse Way Roman road descends into Batheaston via Bannerdown hill, before joining the London Road (A4), also a former Roman road. The hill rises to 189 metres (620 ft) above sea level, and by the roadside on the top of the hill (grid reference ST796700) rest the Three Shire Stones – three vertical blocks of limestone with a large cap – which mark where the historical counties of Gloucestershire, Wiltshire and Somerset meet. The stones are formed in the style of a burial chamber, and inside are three small dressed stones (the original stones), each dated 1736 and bearing the initial of one of the three counties. The previous Shire stones are shown on a John Speed map dated 1610. In 1859 a cromlech was erected over the top of the original stones, which possibly were part of a burial chamber. Local newspapers and national journals of the time report that three skeletons were found in the hole, along with a James II coin, during the work. Each stone is approximately 9–12 feet in height and weighs four to five tons, with the cap being of a similar size and weight. The work in 1859 was costed as £34 5s 8d; dinner to the workmen was included.

The northern end of the Bannerdown ridge is home to Colerne Airfield, a Second World War RAF Fighter Command and Bomber Command airfield. The hill is littered with former quarries where Bath stone was extracted.

== Transport ==
The 3-mile (5 km) £45 million A46 dual-carriageway Batheaston/Swainswick bypass opened in summer 1996. It joins the main A4 road which used to follow the Fosse Way which runs through the village.

The village is on the route of the Limestone Link, a 36 miles (58 km) long-distance footpath from the Mendip Hills in Somerset to Cold Aston in the Cotswolds in Gloucestershire.

The centre of Bath is also accessible through Batheaston via the bus routes that operate in the area.

== Religious sites ==
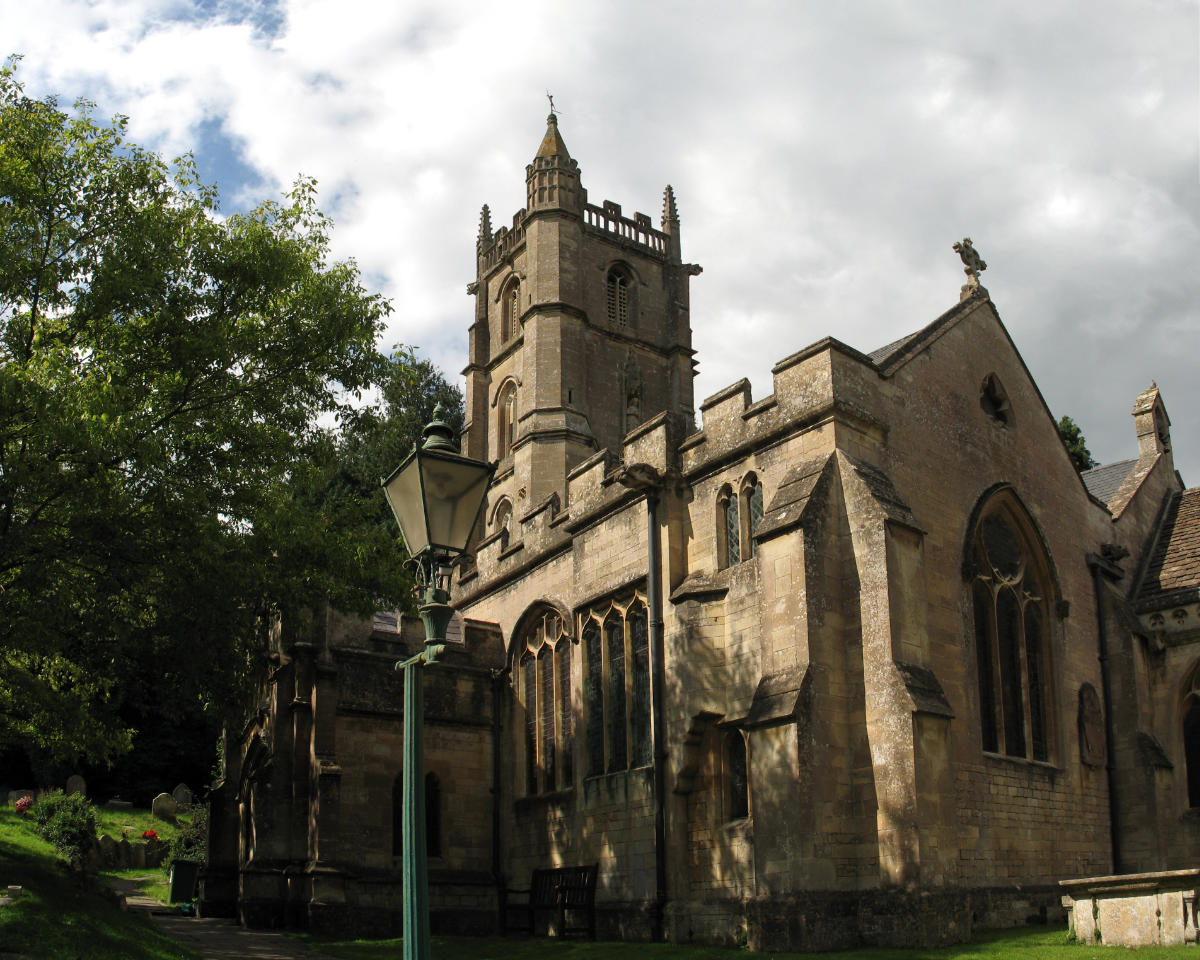
Church of St John The Baptist

The Anglican parish church of Batheaston is the Church of St John The Baptist, and the parish is joined with St Catherine. It was built in the 12th century, and remodelled in the late 15th century. The west tower – which has four stages with a pierced embattled parapet, setback buttresses, projecting octagonal stairs, and a turret at the south-east corner which terminates in a spirelet – was rebuilt in 1834 by John Pinch the Younger of Bath. It has pointed perpendicular two-light windows with cusped heads and the east side has a canopied niche containing a figure, probably St John. The church is a Grade II* listed building.

The Catholic Church of the Good Shepherd, in the Diocese of Clifton, was built in 1967 in poured concrete in the brutalist architecture style, with an internally colourful large translucent window made of Kalwall (a type of polycarbonate). It closed in 2020 owing to a declining congregation, and in 2025 the building was offered for sale.

== Landmarks ==
The Riverside studios in Batheaston have been used by several musicians to record their albums, including Mighty ReArranger by Robert Plant.

Batheaston House was built in 1712 for Henry Walters (1667–1753), a wealthy clothier who succeeded to the property through his grandfather, Henry Blanchard.

Pine House dates from 1672, having been built for Richard and Mary Panton. It was extended to the north in the early 18th century.

Eagle House was built in the late 17th/early 18th century and then remodelled in 1724 and again in 1729 by architect John Wood, the Elder as his own house. The house was home to Mary Blathwayt and her family and became an important refuge for suffragettes who had been released from prison after hunger strikes, with trees being planted to commemorate each woman. At least 47 trees were planted between April 1909 and July 1911, including for Emmeline Pankhurst, Christabel Pankhurst, Charlotte Despard, Millicent Fawcett and Lady Lytton. The trees planted at Eagle House were removed to make way for a housing estate. Other trees have been planted to mirror the lost memorials.

== Notable people ==
- Mary Blathwayt (1879–1961), local suffragette
- John Josias Conybeare (1779–1824), became vicar of Batheaston, and was Professor of Anglo-Saxon (1808–1812), and afterwards Professor of Poetry (1812–1821), at Oxford. He published a translation of Beowulf in English and Latin verse (1814)
- Edmund Fallowfield Longrigg (usually known as "Bunty") (1906–1974), played cricket for Somerset and Cambridge University
- William Lonsdale (1794–1871), geologist and palaeontologist
- Colin G. Maggs (1932–), railway author, deputy headmaster Batheaston Church of England school
- Oswald Nock (1904–1994), railway author and signal engineer
- John Wood, the Younger (1728–1782), architect
- Patrick Young Alexander (1867–1943), aeronautical pioneer
