= List of United Kingdom locations: Highs-Hn =

The United Kingdom

This is part of the list of United Kingdom locations: a gazetteer of place names in the United Kingdom showing each place's locality and geographical coordinates.

== Hig (continued) ==
=== High S-High W ===
Location	Locality	Coordinates (links to map & photo sources)	OS grid reference
High Salvington	West Sussex	50.84°N 00.41°W	TQ1206
High Scales	Cumbria	54.79°N 03.27°W	NY1845
High Sellafield	Cumbria	54.42°N 03.51°W	NY0204
High Shaw	North Yorkshire	54.31°N 02.21°W	SD8691
High Shields	South Tyneside	54.98°N 01.43°W	NZ3666
High Shincliffe	Durham	54.75°N 01.55°W	NZ2940
High Side	Cumbria	54.65°N 03.19°W	NY2330
High Southwick	Sunderland	54.92°N 01.40°W	NZ3859
High Spen	Gateshead	54.92°N 01.79°W	NZ1359
High Stakesby	North Yorkshire	54.47°N 00.64°W	NZ8810
Highstead	Kent	51.35°N 01.17°E	TR2166
Highsted	Kent	51.31°N 00.73°E	TQ9161
High Stoop	Durham	54.75°N 01.84°W	NZ1040
High Street	Kent	51.04°N 00.48°E	TQ7430
High Street	Cornwall	50.34°N 04.86°W	SW9653
High Street (Ilketshall St Margaret)	Suffolk	52.40°N 01.46°E	TM3684
High Street (Darsham)	Suffolk	52.27°N 01.53°E	TM4170
High Street (Iken)	Suffolk	52.14°N 01.55°E	TM4355
Highstreet	Kent	51.31°N 00.98°E	TR0862
High Street Green	Essex	51.97°N 00.56°E	TL7634
Highstreet Green	Surrey	51.10°N 00.60°W	SU9835
High Street Green	Suffolk	52.15°N 00.92°E	TM0055
High Sunderland	Scottish Borders	55.57°N 02.84°W	NT4731
Hightae	Dumfries and Galloway	55.08°N 03.42°W	NY0978
Highter's Heath	Birmingham	52.40°N 01.88°W	SP0879
High Throston	Hartlepool	54.69°N 01.25°W	NZ4833
High Town	Luton	51.87°N 00.41°W	TL0921
High Town	Shropshire	52.53°N 02.42°W	SO7193
High Town	Staffordshire	52.70°N 02.03°W	SJ9812
Hightown	Cheshire	53.15°N 02.19°W	SJ8762
Hightown (New Forest)	Hampshire	50.83°N 01.77°W	SU1604
Hightown (Southampton)	Hampshire	50.89°N 01.33°W	SU4711
Hightown	Kirklees	53.71°N 01.72°W	SE1824
Hightown	Sefton	53.51°N 03.07°W	SD2903
Hightown	Wrexham	53.03°N 03.00°W	SJ3349
Hightown Green	Suffolk	52.16°N 00.87°E	TL9756
Hightown Heights	Calderdale	53.71°N 01.74°W	SE1724
High Toynton	Lincolnshire	53.20°N 00.08°W	TF2869
High Trewhitt	Northumberland	55.33°N 02.00°W	NU0005
High Urpeth	Durham	54.87°N 01.64°W	NZ2353
High Valleyfield	Fife	56.05°N 03.60°W	NT0086
High Walton	Cumbria	54.49°N 03.57°W	NX9812
High Warden	Northumberland	54.99°N 02.14°W	NY9167
High Water Head	Cumbria	54.37°N 03.06°W	SD3198
Highway	Somerset	50.97°N 02.77°W	ST4620
Highway	Cornwall	50.24°N 05.21°W	SW7143
Highway	Herefordshire	52.13°N 02.80°W	SO4549
Highway	Berkshire	51.52°N 00.76°W	SU8681
Highway	Wiltshire	51.46°N 01.94°W	SU0474
Highweek	Devon	50.53°N 03.63°W	SX8472
High Westwood	Durham	54.89°N 01.83°W	NZ1155
High Whinnow	Cumbria	54.84°N 03.09°W	NY3051
Highwood	Devon	50.84°N 03.22°W	ST1406
Highwood	Dorset	50.66°N 02.19°W	SY8685
Highwood	Hampshire	50.86°N 01.75°W	SU1707
Highwood	Worcestershire	52.29°N 02.51°W	SO6566
Highwood	Essex	51.71°N 00.37°E	TL6404
Highwood Hill	Barnet	51.62°N 00.23°W	TQ2293
High Woolaston	Gloucestershire	51.68°N 02.62°W	ST5799
High Worsall	North Yorkshire	54.47°N 01.41°W	NZ3809
Highworth	Swindon	51.62°N 01.71°W	SU2092
Highworthy	Devon	50.85°N 04.21°W	SS4408
High Wray	Cumbria	54.38°N 02.97°W	SD3799
High Wych	Hertfordshire	51.80°N 00.11°E	TL4614
High Wycombe	Buckinghamshire	51.62°N 00.75°W	SU8693

== Hil ==
Location	Locality	Coordinates (links to map & photo sources)	OS grid reference
Hilborough	Norfolk	52.56°N 00.68°E	TF8200
Hilcot	Gloucestershire	51.84°N 02.01°W	SO9916
Hilcote	Derbyshire	53.11°N 01.32°W	SK4558
Hilcot End	Gloucestershire	51.71°N 01.90°W	SP0702
Hilcott	Wiltshire	51.32°N 01.84°W	SU1158
Hildasay	Shetland Islands	60.14°N 01.36°W	HU354400
Hildenborough	Kent	51.21°N 00.23°E	TQ5648
Hilden Park	Kent	51.20°N 00.24°E	TQ5747
Hildersham	Cambridgeshire	52.10°N 00.24°E	TL5448
Hildersley	Herefordshire	51.91°N 02.56°W	SO6124
Hilderstone	Staffordshire	52.90°N 02.09°W	SJ9434
Hilderthorpe	East Riding of Yorkshire	54.06°N 00.21°W	TA1765
Hilfield	Dorset	50.83°N 02.52°W	ST6304
Hilgay	Norfolk	52.55°N 00.38°E	TL6298
Hill	Warwickshire	52.29°N 01.34°W	SP4567
Hill	Birmingham	52.58°N 01.83°W	SP1199
Hill	South Gloucestershire	51.65°N 02.52°W	ST6495
Hillam	North Yorkshire	53.74°N 01.24°W	SE5028
Hillberry	Isle of Man	54.18°N 04.48°W	SC3879
Hillblock	Pembrokeshire	51.79°N 04.90°W	SN0015
Hillborough	Kent	51.35°N 01.15°E	TR2067
Hill Bottom	Oxfordshire	51.50°N 01.07°W	SU6479
Hillbourne	Poole	50.74°N 02.00°W	SZ0094
Hill Brow	Hampshire	51.02°N 00.87°W	SU7926
Hillbutts	Dorset	50.80°N 02.01°W	ST9901
Hill Chorlton	Staffordshire	52.94°N 02.31°W	SJ7939
Hillcliffe	Cheshire	53.36°N 02.58°W	SJ6185
Hillclifflane	Derbyshire	53.01°N 01.56°W	SK2947
Hillcommon	Somerset	51.02°N 03.22°W	ST1426
Hill Common	Norfolk	52.74°N 01.56°E	TG4122
Hill Corner	Somerset	51.23°N 02.28°W	ST8048
Hill Croome	Worcestershire	52.05°N 02.17°W	SO8840
Hillcross	City of Derby	52.89°N 01.51°W	SK3333
Hill Dale	Lancashire	53.60°N 02.77°W	SD4912
Hill Deverill	Wiltshire	51.15°N 02.20°W	ST8640
Hilldyke	Lincolnshire	53.00°N 00.00°E	TF3447
Hillend	Angus	56.62°N 02.84°W	NO4848
Hill End	Durham	54.71°N 01.98°W	NZ0135
Hillend	Edinburgh	55.89°N 03.20°W	NT2566
Hill End	Fife	56.13°N 03.56°W	NT0395
Hillend	Fife	56.03°N 03.38°W	NT1483
Hill End	Gloucestershire	52.03°N 02.14°W	SO9037
Hill End	London Borough of Hillingdon	51.60°N 00.49°W	TQ0491
Hillend	North Lanarkshire	55.88°N 03.88°W	NS8267
Hillend	North Somerset	51.31°N 02.90°W	ST3758
Hill End	North Yorkshire	53.98°N 01.86°W	SE0954
Hillend	Shropshire	52.54°N 02.29°W	SO8094
Hill End	Somerset	50.89°N 02.71°W	ST5011
Hillend	Swansea	51.59°N 04.29°W	SS4191
Hill End	Worcestershire	52.26°N 02.14°W	SO9063
Hillend Green	Gloucestershire	51.94°N 02.43°W	SO7028
Hillersland	Gloucestershire	51.82°N 02.63°W	SO5614
Hillerton	Devon	50.76°N 03.81°W	SX7298
Hillesden	Buckinghamshire	51.94°N 01.01°W	SP6828
Hillesden Hamlet	Buckinghamshire	51.96°N 01.02°W	SP6730
Hillesley	Gloucestershire	51.59°N 02.34°W	ST7689
Hillfarrance	Somerset	51.00°N 03.19°W	ST1624
Hillfield	Devon	50.34°N 03.64°W	SX8351
Hillfield	Solihull	52.40°N 01.79°W	SP1478
Hillfields	Coventry	52.40°N 01.50°W	SP3479
Hillfields	City of Bristol	51.47°N 02.51°W	ST6475
Hillfoot	Leeds	53.79°N 01.69°W	SE2033
Hillfoot End	Bedfordshire	51.99°N 00.37°W	TL1234
Hill Furze	Worcestershire	52.13°N 02.01°W	SO9948
Hill Gate	Herefordshire	51.93°N 02.74°W	SO4927
Hill Green	Essex	51.96°N 00.15°E	TL4832
Hill Green	Kent	51.32°N 00.62°E	TQ8362
Hill Green	Berkshire	51.48°N 01.35°W	SU4576
Hillgrove	West Sussex	51.04°N 00.66°W	SU9428
Hillhampton	Worcestershire	52.11°N 02.61°W	SO5847
Hill Head	Hampshire	50.81°N 01.23°W	SU5402
Hillhead (near Inverurie)	Aberdeenshire	57.27°N 02.33°W	NJ8021
Hillhead (near Westhill)	Aberdeenshire	57.18°N 02.34°W	NJ7910
Hillhead	Cornwall	50.40°N 04.68°W	SX0960
Hillhead	Devon	50.36°N 03.54°W	SX9053
Hillhead	East Ayrshire	55.61°N 04.51°W	NS4238
Hillhead	South Ayrshire	55.43°N 04.49°W	NS4219
Hillhead of Mountblairy	Aberdeenshire	57.56°N 02.53°W	NJ6853
Hill Hoath	Kent	51.17°N 00.13°E	TQ4944
Hill Hook	Birmingham	52.59°N 01.85°W	SK1000
Hill Houses	Shropshire	52.40°N 02.54°W	SO6379
Hilliard's Cross	Staffordshire	52.69°N 01.77°W	SK1511
Hillingdon	London Borough of Hillingdon	51.52°N 00.44°W	TQ0882
Hillingdon Heath	London Borough of Hillingdon	51.52°N 00.45°W	TQ0782
Hillington	Norfolk	52.79°N 00.53°E	TF7125
Hillington	Renfrewshire	55.84°N 04.38°W	NS5164
Hillis Corner	Isle of Wight	50.73°N 01.33°W	SZ4793
Hillmoor	Devon	50.90°N 03.28°W	ST1013
Hillmorton	Warwickshire	52.35°N 01.22°W	SP5373
Hill Mountain	Pembrokeshire	51.73°N 04.94°W	SM9708
Hillock Vale	Lancashire	53.75°N 02.36°W	SD7629
Hill of Beath	Fife	56.09°N 03.38°W	NT1490
Hill of Drip	Stirling	56.13°N 03.99°W	NS7695
Hill of Fearn	Highland	57.76°N 03.96°W	NH8377
Hill of Mountblairy	Aberdeenshire	57.56°N 02.55°W	NJ6753
Hill Park	Hampshire	50.86°N 01.21°W	SU5507
Hill Park	Kent	51.27°N 00.04°E	TQ4355
Hillpool	Worcestershire	52.38°N 02.16°W	SO8976
Hillpound	Hampshire	50.93°N 01.17°W	SU5815
Hill Ridware	Staffordshire	52.75°N 01.89°W	SK0717
Hillsborough	Sheffield	53.40°N 01.52°W	SK3290
Hillside	Aberdeenshire	57.06°N 02.13°W	NO9297
Hillside	Angus	56.74°N 02.49°W	NO7061
Hill Side	Barnsley	53.51°N 01.66°W	SE2202
Hillside (Honiton)	Devon	50.83°N 03.18°W	ST1705
Hillside (South Brent)	Devon	50.42°N 03.83°W	SX7060
Hill Side	Hampshire	51.03°N 00.88°W	SU7827
Hillside	Hampshire	51.24°N 00.92°W	SU7550
Hill Side	Kirklees	53.64°N 01.72°W	SE1817
Hillside (Burray)	Orkney Islands	58.84°N 02.93°W	ND4696
Hillside (Birsay)	Orkney Islands	59.09°N 03.20°W	HY3124
Hillside	Sefton	53.61°N 03.02°W	SD3214
Hillside	Shetland Islands	60.35°N 01.27°W	HU4063
Hillside	Shropshire	52.47°N 02.60°W	SO5987
Hillside	Wiltshire	51.62°N 01.91°W	SU0692
Hill Side	Worcestershire	52.24°N 02.36°W	SO7561
Hill Somersal	Derbyshire	52.90°N 01.79°W	SK1434
Hillstown	Derbyshire	53.21°N 01.28°W	SK4869
Hill Street	Kent	51.16°N 01.01°E	TR1145
Hillstreet	Hampshire	50.94°N 01.51°W	SU3416
Hillswick	Shetland Islands	60.47°N 01.49°W	HU2877
Hill Top	Barnsley	53.54°N 01.59°W	SE2705
Hilltop	Blaenau Gwent	51.77°N 03.21°W	SO1609
Hill Top	Bradford	53.79°N 01.86°W	SE0933
Hilltop	Buckinghamshire	51.70°N 00.61°W	SP9602
Hilltop	Derbyshire	53.16°N 01.49°W	SK3463
Hill Top	Derbyshire	53.28°N 01.47°W	SK3577
Hill Top	Doncaster	53.46°N 01.26°W	SK4997
Hill Top (Teesdale)	Durham	54.61°N 02.01°W	NY9924
Hill Top (Langley Park)	Durham	54.79°N 01.67°W	NZ2144
Hill Top (Stanley)	Durham	54.88°N 01.75°W	NZ1654
Hill Top	Hampshire	50.82°N 01.43°W	SU4003
Hill Top	Kirklees	53.61°N 01.89°W	SE0713
Hill Top	Leeds	53.80°N 01.62°W	SE2534
Hill Top (Harrogate)	North Yorkshire	54.05°N 01.60°W	SE2662
Hill Top (Dacre)	North Yorkshire	54.04°N 01.71°W	SE1961
Hill Top	Nottinghamshire	53.00°N 01.30°W	SK4746
Hill Top (Blackburn)	Rotherham	53.42°N 01.41°W	SK3992
Hill Top	Salford	53.52°N 02.40°W	SD7303
Hill Top	Sandwell	52.53°N 02.01°W	SO9993
Hill Top (Dungworth)	Sheffield	53.39°N 01.58°W	SK2889
Hill Top	Staffordshire	52.66°N 02.17°W	SJ8808
Hill Top (Nuneaton)	Warwickshire	52.50°N 01.47°W	SP3690
Hill Top (Coventry)	Warwickshire	52.50°N 01.57°W	SP2990
Hill Top	West Sussex	50.97°N 00.74°W	SU8820
Hill View	Dorset	50.75°N 02.02°W	SY9895
Hillview	Sunderland	54.87°N 01.39°W	NZ3954
Hillway	Isle of Wight	50.67°N 01.10°W	SZ6386
Hillwell	Shetland Islands	59.91°N 01.34°W	HU3714
Hill Wood	Birmingham	52.59°N 01.82°W	SK1200
Hill Wootton	Warwickshire	52.30°N 01.56°W	SP3068
Hillyfields	Hampshire	50.93°N 01.47°W	SU3715
Hillyland	Perth and Kinross	56.40°N 03.47°W	NO0924
Hilmarton	Wiltshire	51.47°N 01.97°W	SU0275
Hilperton	Wiltshire	51.33°N 02.18°W	ST8759
Hilperton Marsh	Wiltshire	51.33°N 02.20°W	ST8659
Hilsea	City of Portsmouth	50.82°N 01.07°W	SU6503
Hilston	East Riding of Yorkshire	53.77°N 00.05°W	TA2833
Hiltingbury	Hampshire	50.99°N 01.38°W	SU4322
Hilton	Dorset	50.82°N 02.31°W	ST7803
Hilton	Cambridgeshire	52.27°N 00.12°W	TL2866
Hilton	Shropshire	52.55°N 02.34°W	SO7795
Hilton (near Portmahomack)	Highland	57.84°N 03.82°W	NH9285
Hilton (Inverness)	Highland	57.45°N 04.21°W	NH6743
Hilton (near Tain)	Highland	57.79°N 04.03°W	NH7980
Hilton	Durham	54.58°N 01.75°W	NZ1621
Hilton	Cumbria	54.57°N 02.41°W	NY7320
Hilton	Stockton-on-Tees	54.49°N 01.29°W	NZ4611
Hilton	Derbyshire	52.86°N 01.64°W	SK2430
Hilton	Staffordshire	52.64°N 01.88°W	SK0805
Hilton	Scottish Borders	55.74°N 02.19°W	NT8850
Hilton	City of Aberdeen	57.16°N 02.15°W	NJ9108
Hilton House	Bolton	53.56°N 02.56°W	SD6308
Hilton of Cadboll	Highland	57.76°N 03.90°W	NH8776
Hilton Park	Bury	53.51°N 02.28°W	SD8102

== Him-Hin ==
Location	Locality	Coordinates (links to map & photo sources)	OS grid reference
Himbleton	Worcestershire	52.22°N 02.08°W	SO9458
Himley	Staffordshire	52.51°N 02.19°W	SO8791
Hincaster	Cumbria	54.24°N 02.76°W	SD5084
Hinchliffe Mill	Kirklees	53.55°N 01.82°W	SE1207
Hinchley Wood	Surrey	51.37°N 00.34°W	TQ1565
Hinchwick	Gloucestershire	51.96°N 01.79°W	SP1430
Hinckley	Leicestershire	52.54°N 01.38°W	SP4294
Hincknowle	Dorset	50.77°N 02.72°W	SY4997
Hinderclay	Suffolk	52.34°N 00.96°E	TM0276
Hinderton	Cheshire	53.29°N 03.05°W	SJ3078
Hinderwell	North Yorkshire	54.53°N 00.78°W	NZ7916
Hindford	Shropshire	52.88°N 02.99°W	SJ3332
Hindhead	Surrey	51.11°N 00.74°W	SU8836
Hindle Fold	Lancashire	53.78°N 02.41°W	SD7332
Hindley	Northumberland	54.92°N 01.93°W	NZ0459
Hindley	Wigan	53.53°N 02.57°W	SD6204
Hindley Green	Wigan	53.52°N 02.55°W	SD6303
Hindlip	Worcestershire	52.22°N 02.19°W	SO8758
Hindolveston	Norfolk	52.82°N 01.01°E	TG0329
Hindon	Wiltshire	51.08°N 02.12°W	ST9132
Hindpool	Cumbria	54.11°N 03.24°W	SD1969
Hindringham	Norfolk	52.88°N 00.94°E	TF9836
Hindsford	Wigan	53.51°N 02.48°W	SD6802
Hingham	Norfolk	52.57°N 00.98°E	TG0202
Hinstock	Shropshire	52.83°N 02.46°W	SJ6926
Hintlesham	Suffolk	52.04°N 01.03°E	TM0843
Hinton	Somerset	50.97°N 02.61°W	ST5720
Hinton	Hampshire	50.75°N 01.71°W	SZ2095
Hinton	Northamptonshire	52.16°N 01.22°W	SP5352
Hinton	Herefordshire	52.03°N 02.97°W	SO3338
Hinton	Gloucestershire	51.72°N 02.46°W	SO6803
Hinton	South Gloucestershire	51.48°N 02.39°W	ST7376
Hinton	Shropshire	52.66°N 02.88°W	SJ4008
Hinton Ampner	Hampshire	51.03°N 01.15°W	SU5927
Hinton Blewett	Bath and North East Somerset	51.30°N 02.58°W	ST5956
Hinton Charterhouse	Bath and North East Somerset	51.32°N 02.33°W	ST7758
Hinton Cross	Worcestershire	52.05°N 01.95°W	SP0340
Hinton-in-the-Hedges	Northamptonshire	52.01°N 01.19°W	SP5536
Hinton Martell	Dorset	50.85°N 01.98°W	SU0106
Hinton on the Green	Worcestershire	52.05°N 01.97°W	SP0240
Hinton Parva	Dorset	50.83°N 02.01°W	ST9904
Hinton Parva	Swindon	51.54°N 01.68°W	SU2283
Hinton St George	Somerset	50.90°N 02.82°W	ST4212
Hinton St Mary	Dorset	50.94°N 02.31°W	ST7816
Hinton Waldrist	Oxfordshire	51.67°N 01.46°W	SU3798
Hints	Shropshire	52.37°N 02.57°W	SO6175
Hints	Staffordshire	52.61°N 01.77°W	SK1502
Hinwick	Bedfordshire	52.23°N 00.63°W	SP9361
Hinwood	Shropshire	52.66°N 02.94°W	SJ3608
Hinxhill	Kent	51.14°N 00.91°E	TR0442
Hinxton	Cambridgeshire	52.08°N 00.17°E	TL4945
Hinxworth	Hertfordshire	52.04°N 00.20°W	TL2340

== Hip-Hiz ==
Location	Locality	Coordinates (links to map & photo sources)	OS grid reference
Hippenscombe	Wiltshire	51.30°N 01.56°W	SU3156
Hipperholme	Calderdale	53.72°N 01.81°W	SE1225
Hipsburn	Northumberland	55.38°N 01.63°W	NU2310
Hipswell	North Yorkshire	54.36°N 01.72°W	SE1897
Hirael	Gwynedd	53.22°N 04.12°W	SH5872
Hiraeth	Carmarthenshire	51.85°N 04.65°W	SN1721
Hirn	Aberdeenshire	57.09°N 02.44°W	NJ7300
Hirnant	Powys	52.78°N 03.41°W	SJ0522
Hirst	Northumberland	55.17°N 01.56°W	NZ2887
Hirst	North Lanarkshire	55.84°N 03.82°W	NS8663
Hirst Courtney	North Yorkshire	53.70°N 01.07°W	SE6124
Hirta	Western Isles	57.81°N 08.58°W	NF094995
Hirwaen	Denbighshire	53.13°N 03.30°W	SJ1361
Hirwaun	Rhondda, Cynon, Taff	51.73°N 03.52°W	SN9505
Hirwaun Common	Bridgend	51.53°N 03.54°W	SS9383
Hiscott	Devon	51.01°N 04.08°W	SS5426
Hislop	Scottish Borders	55.32°N 02.99°W	NT3704
Hisomley	Wiltshire	51.24°N 02.21°W	ST8549
Histon	Cambridgeshire	52.24°N 00.09°E	TL4363
Hitcham	Suffolk	52.12°N 00.89°E	TL9851
Hitchill	Dumfries and Galloway	54.99°N 03.34°W	NY1467
Hitchin	Hertfordshire	51.95°N 00.26°W	TL1930
Hitchin Hill	Hertfordshire	51.93°N 00.28°W	TL1828
Hitcombe Bottom	Wiltshire	51.16°N 02.25°W	ST8241
Hither Green	Lewisham	51.444°N 00.000°E	TQ390743
Hittisleigh	Devon	50.73°N 3.79°W	SX7395
Hive	East Riding of Yorkshire	53.76°N 00.75°W	SE8231
Hixon	Staffordshire	52.82°N 02.00°W	SK0025
