= Hillhead (disambiguation) =

Hillhead is a district of Glasgow, Scotland.

Hillhead or Hill Head may also refer to:

- Hillhead (ward), an electoral ward of the Glasgow City Council
- Glasgow Hillhead (UK Parliament constituency)
- Hillhead, Cornwall, a hamlet in England
- Hillhead, Devon, a location in England
- Hillhead, East Ayrshire, a location in Scotland
- Hillhead, Keithhall and Kinkell, a location in Aberdeenshire, Scotland
- Hillhead, Kinellar, a location in Aberdeenshire, Scotland
- Hillhead, South Ayrshire, a location in Scotland
- Hillhead, South Dakota, a community in the United States
- Hillhead Student Village, student accommodation in Aberdeen, Scotland
- Hill Head, a village in Hampshire, England
- Hillhead of Mountblairy, a location in Aberdeenshire, Scotland
