= Tony Lovell =

British WWII flying ace (1919–1945)

Anthony Desmond Joseph Lovell
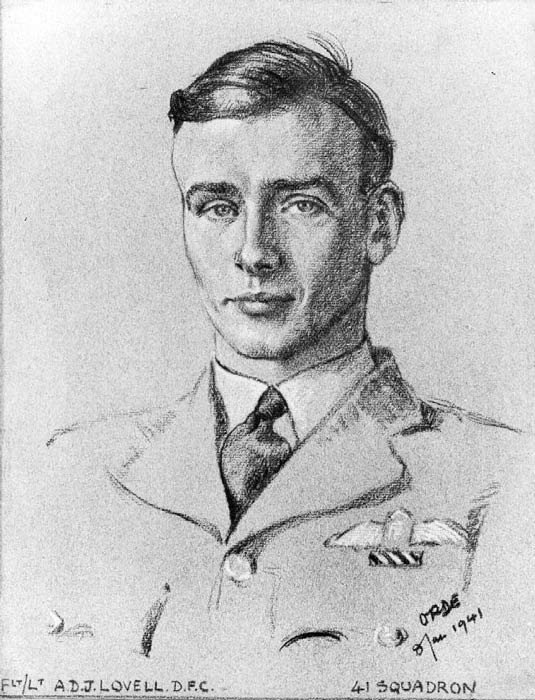
- Portrait of Lovell, made by Cuthbert Orde in 1941
- Born: 9 August 1919; Ceylon
- Died: 17 August 1945 (aged 26); Old Sarum, England
- Burial place: Portrush Cemetery
- Military career
- Allegiance: United Kingdom
- Branch: Royal Air Force
- Service years: 1937–1945
- Rank: Wing Commander
- Nickname: 'Tony'
- Service number: 40402
- Commands: No. 244 Wing (1944); No. 322 Wing (1943–44); No. 1435 Squadron (1942–43); No. 145 Squadron (1941–42)
- Conflicts: Second World War: Battle of Britain; Siege of Malta
- Awards: Distinguished Service Order & Bar; Distinguished Flying Cross & Bar; Distinguished Flying Cross (United States)

Anthony Lovell, DSO & Bar, DFC & Bar (9 August 1919 – 17 August 1945) was a fighter pilot and flying ace of the Royal Air Force (RAF) during the Second World War. He is credited with the destruction of at least 22 aircraft.

Born in Ceylon, Lovell joined the RAF in 1937, and was serving with No. 41 Squadron at the time of the outbreak of the Second World War. He served throughout most of the Battle of Britain, achieving a number of his aerial victories. He subsequently commanded No. 145 Squadron from late 1941 to early 1942. Later that year he was sent to Malta where he led No. 1435 Squadron, achieving several more aerial victories. He served in a series of staff and instructing roles, in addition to two periods as a leader of fighter wings during the campaign in Italy. He was killed in a flying accident shortly after the war in Europe had ended.

== Early life ==
Anthony Desmond Joseph Lovell was born on 9 August 1919 in Ceylon. His parents, Stuart C. A. Lovell and Clare Mary Lovell, were from Portrush, Northern Ireland. He was educated in England, at Ampleforth College. In 1937, he joined the Royal Air Force (RAF) on a short service commission, commencing his training on 25 October. Successfully completing this initial phase of training, he was commissioned as acting pilot officer on 9 January 1938. He proceeded onto No. 6 Flying Training School at RAF Netheravon for flight instruction upon completion of which, later the same year, he was posted to No. 41 Squadron. At the time Lovell joined the squadron, it was operating Supermarine Spitfire fighters from RAF Catterick. His pilot officer rank was confirmed on 25 October.

== Second World War ==
At the time of the outbreak of the Second World War, Lovell was serving at Sector Headquarters, Catterick on secondment. It was not until November that he rejoined No. 41 Squadron. It was still based at Catterick and mostly engaged in protective cover for shipping convoys as well as patrols on the east coast. The squadron moved south to RAF Hornchurch on 28 May 1940 and began to operate over Dunkirk, helping cover the evacuation of the British Expeditionary Force from the beaches there. By this time, Lovell was a flying officer, having been promoted to this rank a few days earlier.

=== Battle of Britain ===
Over Dunkirk on 31 May 1940 Lovell shared the destruction of a Heinkel He 111 medium bomber. The next day, he again shared in the shooting down of a He 111. After two weeks operating over Dunkirk, No. 41 Squadron returned to Catterick. Flying from here on 8 July, Lovell shared in the destruction of a Junkers Ju 86 medium bomber to the southeast of Scarborough. The squadron went back to Hornchurch in late July.

In combat off Dover on 28 July, Lovell was attacked by a Messerschmitt Bf 109 fighter reportedly flown by Luftwaffe flying ace Werner Mölders of JG 51 and crashed on landing at RAF Manston. Lovell had been wounded in the thigh and was admitted to Margate Hospital. He returned to his squadron on recovery and on 15 August, near Barnard Castle, shot down a Messerschmitt Bf 110 heavy fighter and probably destroyed a second. On 5 September he was shot down over the Thames Estuary but baled out of his Spitfire unhurt. His aircraft crashed and burned out at South Benfleet. The next day, he shot down a Bf 109 to the north of Manston. By this time he was commanding one of the squadron's flights in an acting capacity.

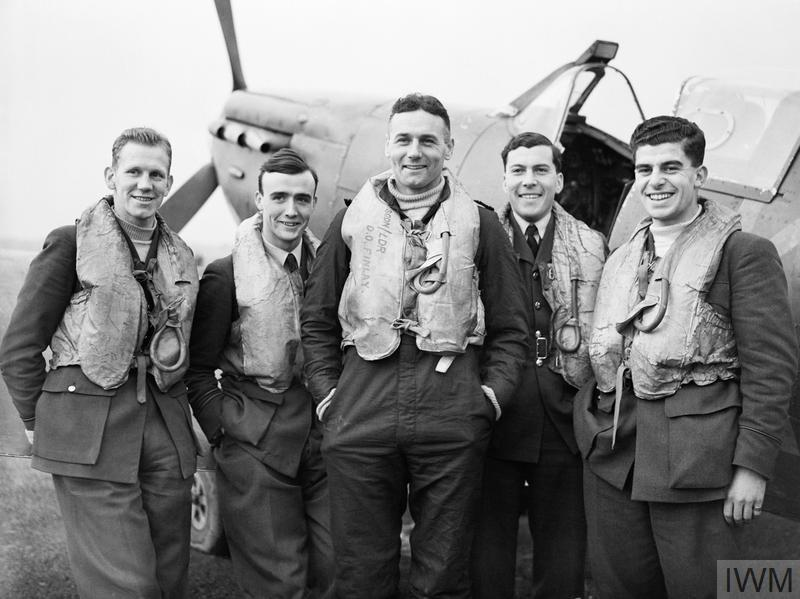
Pilots of No. 41 Squadron; from left to right: John MacKenzie, Lovell, Don Finlay, Edgar Ryder and Roy Ford

On 15 September, in what is now known as Battle of Britain Day, to the southeast of Canterbury, Lovell destroyed a Bf 109. The same day, he also probably destroyed a Bf 109 near Hornchurch. At the end of the month he damaged a Dornier Do 17 medium bomber near Hastings. On 1 October, with his position as flight commander made permanent, he shot down a Bf 109 near Canterbury. He destroyed another Bf 109 on 20 October. A further Bf 109 was damaged by Lovell on 30 October while he was flying a new Spitfire Mk II, which the squadron had started taking delivery of earlier in the month. He destroyed a Bf 109 on 17 November to the north of Herne Bay on 17 November. His successes over the preceding months saw Lovell awarded the Distinguished Flying Cross (DFC). The announcement was made on 26 November, the published citation reading:

This officer has flown continuously on active operations against the enemy since war began. He has shown a fine fighting spirit and has led his flight and on occasions his squadron with great courage, coolness and determination. He has destroyed seven enemy aircraft.

— London Gazette, No. 35001, 26 November 1940

Lovell's final claim of 1940 was for a share in a Bf 109 that was destroyed near Tonbridge on 27 November. No. 41 Squadron saw little action in December and into the early weeks of 1941. It began flying offensive sorties to German-occupied France although also continued with its patrolling duties. Lovell shared in damaging a He 111 near Clacton on 22 January, and several weeks later, on 30 March, he destroyed a Ju 88 over Ouston. Two days later he damaged a He 111 near Leeming airfield.

In late May, Lovell was rested from operations and took up a post as an instructor at No. 58 Operational Training Unit (OTU) at RAF Grangemouth. At the same time, he was promoted acting flight lieutenant. After a few weeks, he was moved to Catterick where he was a controller in the Operations Room there. In October, his flight lieutenant rank was made permanent and he was given command of No. 145 Squadron. This was based at Catterick, flying Spitfires on patrols along the coast while it prepared for a move to the Middle East. Lovell destroyed a Ju 88 on 17 November while flying to the north of Hartlepool. He shot down another Ju 88 off Newcastle on 19 January 1942. The following he was awarded a Bar to his DFC. The published citation read:

This officer is a fearless and skilful fighter pilot. His keenness to engage the enemy, combined with fine leadership, both in the air and on the ground have set an inspiring example. In November 1941 Squadron Leader Lovell shot down a Junkers Ju 88 some 35 miles off the Yorkshire coast. In January 1942 in the same area and in difficult weather conditions he intercepted another Junkers Ju 88 and shot it down into the sea. This officer has personally destroyed at least 11 hostile aircraft and has damaged others.

— London Gazette, No. 35451, 10 February 1942

Later in February No. 145 Squadron was transferred to the Middle East, arriving at Helwan airfield in Egypt in April. However, by the time it became operational Lovell had been posted to the headquarters of RAF Middle East as a controller.

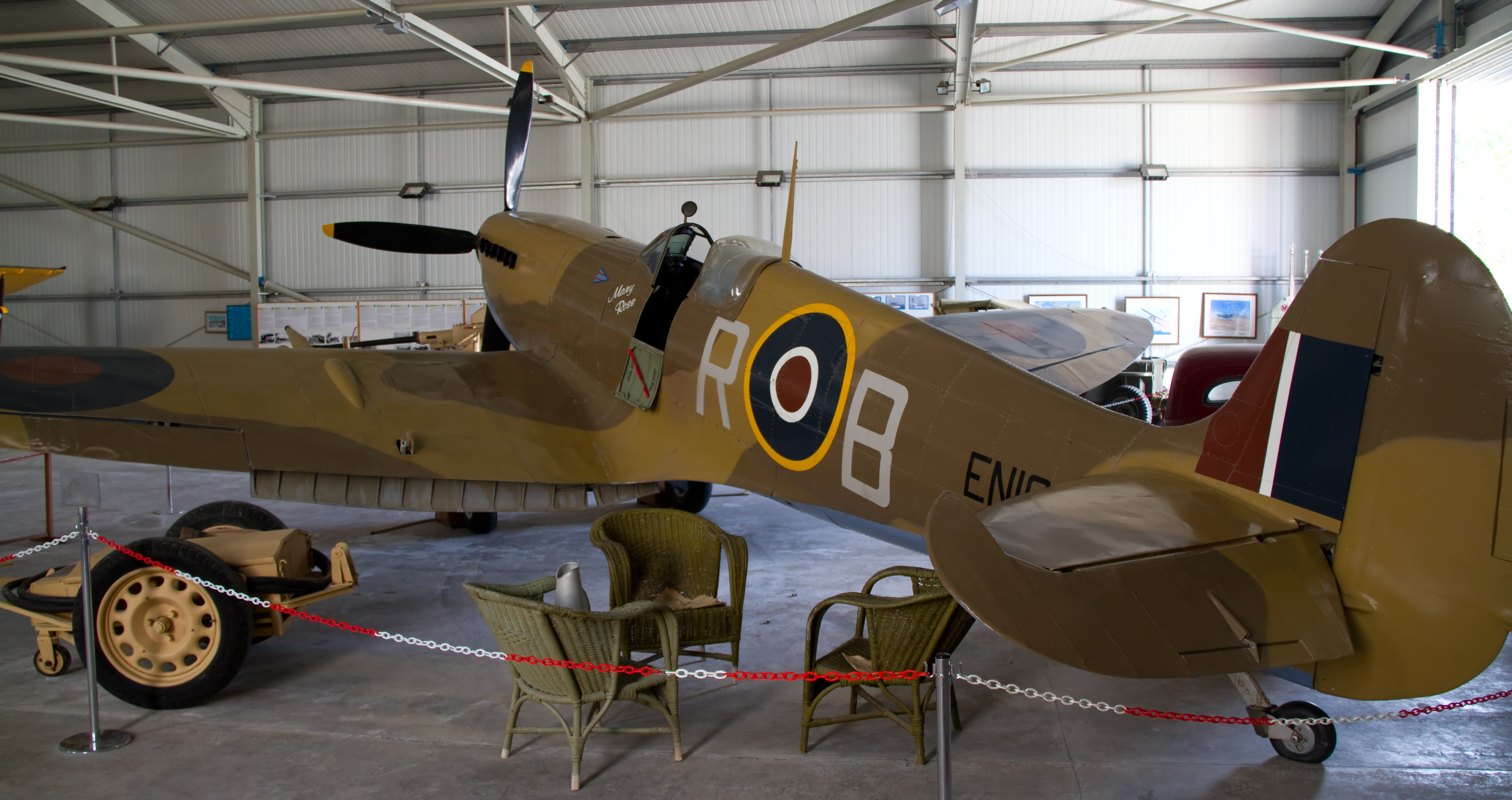
Spitfire in Malta camouflage

=== Siege of Malta ===
On 21 July 1942, Lovell, now a temporary squadron leader, was posted to Malta where he joined No. 1435 Flight. This had been recently raised at Luqa, using nearly arrived Spitfires; Lovell was to be the unit's commander. Two days after his arrival he made his first claim in the aerial fighting over Malta, for shares in two damaged Ju 88s. On 26 July, near Gozo, he damaged a Macchi C.202 fighter. Later the same day, he damaged a Bf 109 near Luqa. He shared in the destruction of a Ju 88 near Kalafrana Bay on 28 July. At the end of the month, Lovell's command was expanded from a flight to a squadron.

On 13 August, No. 1435 Squadron was scrambled to help protect a convoy with much needed supplies approaching Malta. Lovell destroyed a Ju 87 of the Regia Aeronautica (Italian Air Force) that was attacking the convoy. On a subsequent sortie later in the day, he shot down a Savoia-Marchetti SM.84 medium bomber. The next day, he shared in shooting down another Italian Ju 87 harassing the convoy. He damaged a Reggiane Re.2001 fighter off Cap Scalambria on 1 October, and ten days later damaged a Bf 109 near Grand Harbour. The next day, several miles north of St. Paul's Bay, Lovell destroyed a Ju 88. He damaged another Ju 88 on 17 October, this time to the northeast of Zonkor. A Bf 109 was damaged by Lovell near St Paul's Bay on 26 October. In recognition of his successes in the defence of Malta, Lovell was awarded the Distinguished Service Order; the citation, published on 30 October, read:

This officer is an outstanding squadron commander who has played a considerable part in the defence of Malta. One day in October 1942 he led his squadron in an attack against six Junkers Ju 88s escorted by a number of fighters. In the combat Squadron Leader Lovell shot down a Junkers Ju 88 bringing his total victories to nine. On many occasions his skilful leadership has enabled his squadron to intercept enemy air formations bent on attacking Malta. This officer's gallantry and determination have set an example worthy of the highest praise.

— London Gazette, No. 35768, 30 October 1942

Lovell shot down a Ju 88 into the sea on 7 December; the bomber had already been damaged in an engagement with aircraft of No. 185 Squadron. His final claim for 1942 was for a Savoia-Marchetti SM.79 medium bomber which he caught on the ground at Lampedusa and destroyed. He was taken off operations in early 1943 for a rest, and posted to Malta's Sector 8 as a fighter controller. In March he was given command of the Malta Spitfire Wing for a time.

=== Later war service ===
Promoted full squadron leader on 9 April, he spent the later part of 1943 as a staff officer, first at the headquarters of the Northwest African Coastal Air Force and then at the RAF's No. 242 Group. In December, he was appointed wing leader of No. 322 Wing. He led this unit for the next nine months in its operations over the northwest of Italy. On 3 May, over Sienna, he destroyed one Focke Wulf Fw 190 fighter and damaged a second. Later in the month, on 15 May, he shot down a Bf 109 near Lake Bolsena. His final aerial victory was on 15 June, when he destroyed a Fiat G.55 fighter over Piacenza.

In mid-August, Lovell was posted to No. 1 Mobile Operations Room Unit of the Mediterranean Allied Air Forces with which he served for several weeks. An appointment as wing leader at No. 244 Wing, based in Italy at the time, followed. He was awarded the American Distinguished Flying Cross on 14 November. The next month he was sent to Egypt, to serve as chief flight instructor at No. 71 OTU at Ismailia.

On 23 February 1945 Lovell was awarded a Bar to his DSO. As the war in Europe came to an end Lovell was still at Ismailia. He returned to England in June and the following month was posted to the School of Air Support at Old Sarum. On 17 August 1945 Lovell was killed when he crashed into a field adjoining Old Sarum airfield having lost height while performing aerobatics in a Spitfire. Holding the rank of wing commander at the time of his death, he is buried at Portrush Cemetery in County Antrim. He had a brother, Stuart, who also served in the RAF during the war; he was killed on 29 January 1944 flying a Hawker Typhoon fighter on a sortie to Brest in France.

Lovell is credited with destroying 22 aircraft, six being shared with other pilots. He is also believed to have probably destroyed two aircraft, damaged thirteen, including four shared, as well as one destroyed on the ground. His successes were accomplished during five operational tours.

== Bibliography ==
- Cull, Brian; Galea, Frederick (2005). Spitfires Over Malta: The Epic Air Battles of 1942. London: Grub Street. ISBN 1-904943-30-6.
- Rawlings, John (1976). Fighter Squadrons of the RAF and their Aircraft. London: MacDonald & James. ISBN 0-354-01028-X.
- Shores, Christopher; Williams, Clive (1994). Aces High: A Tribute to the Most Notable Fighter Pilots of the British and Commonwealth Forces in WWII. London: Grub Street. ISBN 1-8-9869-7000.
