= Highway (disambiguation) =

A highway is a long road giving a relatively fast connection between two places.

Highway or The Highway may also refer to:

== Places ==
- The Highway, London (previously Ratcliff Highway), a road in the East End of London
- Highway, Berkshire
- Highway, Cornwall
- Highway, Somerset
- Highway, Wiltshire

== Music ==
- Highway (Australian band)
- Highway (Montenegrin band)
- Highway (America album), 1970
- Highway (Free album), 1970
- Highway (Sean Delaney album), 1979
- Highway (The Wilkinsons album), 2005
- Highway (soundtrack), a soundtrack album from the 2014 Hindi film (see below)
- The Highway (Sirius XM), a country music satellite radio station
- The Highway (album), a Holly Williams album
- "Highway", a song by The Moody Blues, previously unreleased prior to the compilation album Time Traveller
- "Highway", a song by twlv from Antiformal
- "Highway", a song by Fat Mattress from Fat Mattress II
- "Highway (Under Construction)", a song by Gorillaz from D-Sides

== Films, TV series and plays ==
- Highway (1995 film), an Indian Malayalam-language film
- Highway (2002 film), an American film starring Jared Leto and Jake Gyllenhaal
- Highway (2012 American film), an American film directed by Coke Daniels
- Highway (2012 Nepali film), a Nepali drama film directed by Deepak Rauniyar
- Highway (2014 Bengali film), an Indian Bengali-language film
- Highway (2014 Hindi film), an Indian Hindi-language film
- Highway (2015 film), an Indian Marathi-language film
- Highway (2022 film), an Indian Telugu-language film
- The Highway, alternate title of the 1934 Chinese silent film The Big Road
- Highway (TV series), religious-oriented UK television series from 1983 to 1993
- Highway (play), 1944 play by Sophie Treadwell
- Gunnery Sergeant Thomas "Tom" Highway, the main character from the movie Heartbreak Ridge, played and directed by Clint Eastwood
- Dave E. "Highway" Harlson, a character from COPS (animated TV series)
- She's Missing, a 2019 film directed by Alexandra McGuinness originally titled Highway

== People ==
- René Highway (1954–1990), Native Canadian dancer
- Tomson Highway (born 1951), Native Canadian playwright

== See also ==
- Heighway, a surname
