= Hill End =

Hill End may refer to:

== Australia ==
- Hill End, New South Wales
- Hill End, Queensland, a suburb of Brisbane
- Hill End, Victoria

== United Kingdom ==
- Hill End, County Durham, England
- Hill End, Fife, a location in the United Kingdom
- Hill End, Gloucestershire, a location in the United Kingdom
- Hill End, Hertfordshire, a location in the United Kingdom
- Hill End, London, a hamlet near Harefield, Hillingdon
- Hill End, North Yorkshire, a location in the United Kingdom
- Hill End, Somerset, a location in the United Kingdom
- Hill End, Worcestershire, a location in the United Kingdom
- Hill End railway station, Hertfordshire, on the defunct Hatfield and St Albans Railway

== See also ==
- Hillend (disambiguation)
- Hills End, a classic in Australian children's literature
