= Hillend =

Hillend may refer to:

- Hillend, Fife
- Hillend, Edinburgh
- Hillend Loch, North Lanarkshire, by the hamlet of Hillend

== See also ==
- Hill End
