= John Webster (RAF officer) =

British WWII flying ace (1916–1940)

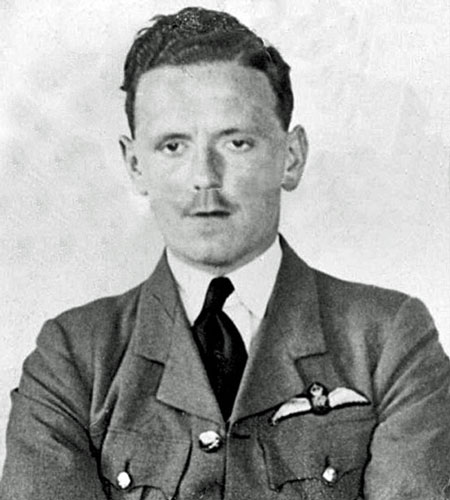
- Born: 1916; Grassendale, Liverpool, United Kingdom
- Died: 5 September 1940 (aged 23–24)
- Military career
- Allegiance: United Kingdom
- Branch: Royal Air Force
- Service years: 1935–1940
- Rank: Flight Lieutenant
- Units: No. 17 Squadron; No. 41 Squadron
- Conflicts: Second World War: Operation Dynamo; Battle of Britain
- Awards: Distinguished Flying Cross

John Webster, DFC (1916 – 5 September 1940) was a British flying ace who served with the Royal Air Force (RAF) during the Second World War. He was credited with having shot down at least eleven aircraft.

From Liverpool, Webster joined the RAF in 1935 on a short service commission. Once his training was completed he was posted to No. 17 Squadron. At the time of the outbreak of the Second World War in September 1939 he was serving with No. 41 Squadron. Flying the Supermarine Spitfire fighter, he achieved several aerial victories while the squadron operated over the evacuation beaches at Dunkirk during Operation Dynamo and in the subsequent Battle of Britain, and was awarded the Distinguished Flying Cross in August 1940. He was killed as a result of a collision with another British fighter during an engagement on 5 September 1940.

== Early life ==
John Terence Webster was born in 1916 at Grassendale in Liverpool, the United Kingdom, the son of John Herbert Webster and Charlotte Annie Webster, both from Northern Ireland. He went to school at Parkfield Prep before going onto Liverpool College. He was on the college's shooting team and represented the United Kingdom at a competition in Canada in 1933. In August 1935, he joined the Royal Air Force (RAF) on a short service commission. Completing his initial induction two months later as an acting pilot officer, he then commenced his flight training at No. 11 Flying Training School at Wittering.

His first posting once his flying training was completed in May 1936 was to No. 17 Squadron. This was based at Kenley and equipped with Bristol Bulldog fighters. In August his rank of pilot officer was made substantive. The following March he was posted to No. 80 Squadron, newly formed at Kenley, spending a year with this unit flying Gloster Gauntlet fighters. In March 1938 he briefly served with No. 29 Squadron at Debden but within a few weeks was posted to No. 41 Squadron. At the time Webster joined the squadron, it was operating Hawker Fury fighters from Catterick but a few months later it began to convert to the Supermarine Spitfire fighter. Not long after his arrival at the squadron, Webster was promoted to flying officer and in May 1939, received a further promotion to acting flight lieutenant and was appointed commander of one of the squadron's flights.

== Second World War ==
Following the outbreak of the Second World War, No. 41 Squadron remained at Catterick for several months. It was mostly engaged in protective cover for shipping convoys as well as patrols on the east coast. On 17 December 1939, Webster was involved in the squadron's first engagement with the Luftwaffe, when he destroyed a Heinkel He 115 seaplane about 5 miles (8.0 km) from Whitby although this could not be confirmed. The squadron moved south to Hornchurch on 28 May 1940 and began to operate over Dunkirk, helping cover the evacuation of the British Expeditionary Force from the beaches there. Webster shot down a Messerschmitt Bf 109 fighter and also shared in the destruction of a Heinkel He 111 medium bomber over Dunkirk on 31 May. The next day, back over Dunkirk, he shot down a pair of Dornier Do 17 medium bombers but only one of these could be confirmed.

=== Battle of Britain ===
After two weeks operating over Dunkirk, No. 41 Squadron returned to Catterick and on the night of 19 June, Webster shot down a He 111 near Teesmouth. The squadron went back to Hornchurch in late July. Webster destroyed what he claimed as a Heinkel He 113 fighter, but was actually a Bf 109, off Dover on 27 July. He shot down another the next afternoon over Dover itself and also damaged a Bf 109; the latter was piloted by the German flying ace Werner Mölders who, despite being wounded in the legs, was able to crash land the stricken Bf 109 back in France.

Webster destroyed yet another Bf 109 off Dover on 29 July and also damaged a Junkers Ju 87 dive bomber. His Spitfire was damaged in the engagement and he crash landed at Manston, which the squadron was using as a forward airfield. On 5 August he damaged a He 111 off Manston and three days later, also off Manston, shot down three Bf 109s and shared in the destruction of a fourth. Webster's flight lieutenant rank was made substantive on 25 August. At the end of the month, it was announced that Webster was to be awarded the Distinguished Flying Cross (DFC). The citation for the DFC was published in The London Gazette and read:

Flight Lieutenant Webster has led his flight in innumerable offensive patrols during the latter part of the Dunkirk operations and during the intensive air fighting over the English Channel and Dover area in protection of shipping. With great skill and gallantry he has personally destroyed seven enemy aircraft and assisted in the destruction of two others. One day in August, 1940, he and another pilot of his section engaged considerably superior numbers of enemy fighters. Three were destroyed by this officer. Not content with this, he also attacked an enemy motor torpedo boat with considerable success. His faculty for seeking out and engaging the enemy has been outstanding.

— London Gazette, No. 34935, 30 August 1940

On 5 September Webster destroyed a Bf 109 south of Gravesend and another near Maidstone. On a subsequent sortie later in the day Webster became involved in a dogfight during which his Spitfire collided with a Hawker Hurricane fighter piloted by Flight Lieutenant R. Lovett. Webster bailed out but was found to be dead on landing. Lovett survived his own bailout but was killed two days later.

Webster's body was cremated at Darlington Crematorium, County Durham, and his ashes scattered over the Irish Sea. He was credited with having shot down eleven German aircraft and shared in the destruction of two others. Two more aerial victories were unconfirmed. He is also credited with having damaged three aircraft.
