= Werner Mölders =

German World War II flying ace

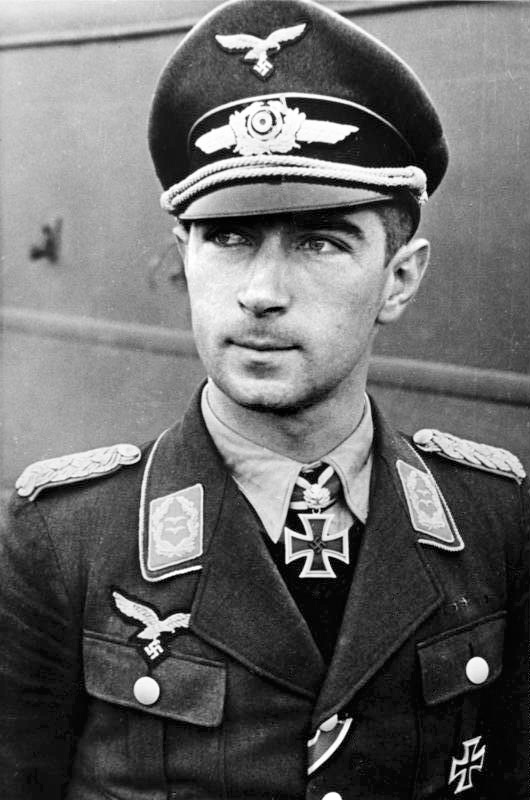
- Mölders as Oberstleutnant
- Born: 18 March 1913; Gelsenkirchen, Kingdom of Prussia, German Empire
- Died: 22 November 1941 (aged 28); Breslau, Free State of Prussia, Nazi Germany
- Burial place: Invalidenfriedhof Berlin
- Military career
- Allegiance: Nazi Germany
- Branch: Luftwaffe
- Service years: 1931–1941
- Rank: Oberst (Colonel)
- Nickname: Vati ("Daddy")
- Units: Condor Legion, JG 53, JG 51
- Commands: III./JG 53, JG 51
- Conflicts: See battles Spanish Civil War World War II: Battle of France; Battle of Britain; Operation Barbarossa
- Awards: Spanish Cross in Gold with Swords and Diamonds; Knight's Cross of the Iron Cross with Oak Leaves, Swords and Diamonds

Werner Mölders (18 March 1913 – 22 November 1941) was a World War II German Luftwaffe pilot, wing commander, and the leading German fighter ace in the Spanish Civil War. He became the first pilot in aviation history to shoot down 100 enemy aircraft and was highly decorated for his achievements. Mölders developed fighter tactics that led to the finger-four formation. He died in a plane crash as a passenger.

Mölders joined the Luftwaffe, the air force of Nazi Germany, in 1934. In 1938 he volunteered for service in Germany's Condor Legion, then supporting General Francisco Franco's Nationalist side in the Spanish Civil War, and shot down 14 aircraft. Following the start of World War II in 1939, he took part in the "Phoney War" of 1939–1940, the Battle of France of May to June 1940, and the Battle of Britain (July 1940 onwards). With his tally standing at 68 victories, Mölders and his unit, Jagdgeschwader 51 (JG 51), transferred to the Eastern Front in June 1941 for the opening of Operation Barbarossa, achieving 101 victories by mid-July 1941.

Prevented from flying further combat missions for propaganda reasons, at the age of 28 Mölders was appointed Inspector of Fighters. While inspecting the Luftwaffe units in the Crimea he received orders to return to Berlin to attend the state funeral of Ernst Udet, a Luftwaffe general and World War I flying ace. The aircraft in which Mölders was traveling as a passenger to Berlin experienced an engine failure and attempted an emergency landing. It crashed at Breslau, killing Mölders and two others.

The Luftwaffe and the West German Bundeswehr both honoured Mölders by naming two fighter wings, a destroyer and a barracks after him. In 1998 the German Parliament decided that members of the Condor Legion such as Mölders should "no longer be honoured". In 2005 the German Ministry of Defence decided to remove the name "Mölders" from the fighter wing still bearing his name.

== Education and early career ==
Mölders was born on 18 March 1913 in Gelsenkirchen, the son of teacher (Oberlehrer) Victor Mölders and his wife Annemarie Mölders, née Riedel. He was the third of four children, with an older sister, Annemarie, an older brother, Hans, and a younger brother, Victor. After his father, a Reserve Leutnant in the King's 145th Infantry Regiment, was killed in action on 2 March 1915 in the Argonne Forest in France, his mother moved the family into her parents' house in Brandenburg an der Havel.

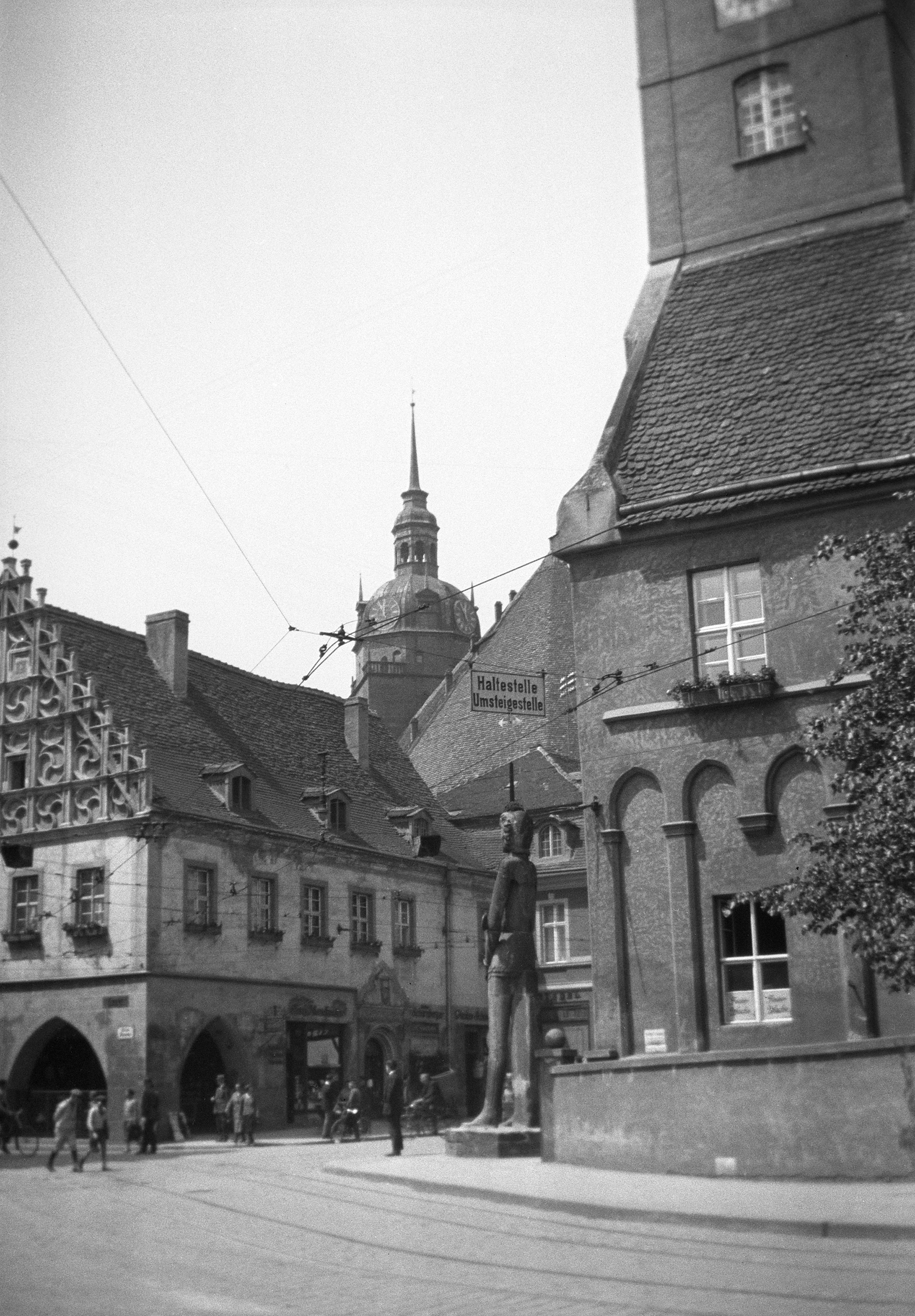
Kurfürstenhaus (left) in Brandenburg, purchased by the Riedel family in 1902.

In Brandenburg, Mölders found a benefactor in Father Erich Klawitter, who instilled firm religious beliefs in him. From 1919 to 1931, Mölders attended, first, the elementary school and then from 1922 the Saldria-Realgymnasium, a secondary school that enjoyed a supraregional reputation. In school he discovered his love for water sports, especially rowing. He joined two rowing clubs, first the Saldria-Brandenburg and later the Brandenburger Ruderclub, and enjoyed success at rowing-regattas. From 1 October 1925, he was also a member of the Bund Neudeutschland in der katholischen Jugendbewegung, a Catholic youth organisation. Mölders graduated from school in early 1931 with the Abitur (diploma) and expressed a desire to become an officer in the armed forces.

Mölders joined the Preußisches Infanterieregiment Nr. 2, an infantry regiment under the command of Oberst Siegfried Haenicke and subordinated to the 1st Division of the Reichswehr in Allenstein, East Prussia on 1 April 1931, serving as an officer cadet in the infantry. He attained the rank of Fahnenjunker-Gefreiter on 1 October 1931, rising to Fahnenjunker-Unteroffizier on 1 April 1932. After completing his basic military training in October 1932, he transferred to the Military School Dresden. On 1 June 1933, he successfully completed his training in Dresden and was promoted to ensign. He again was transferred, this time to the 1st Prussian Pioneer Battalion (Infantry Regiment 2) at the Pioneer School in Munich. During his training years, Mölders made his first attempt to fulfil his dream of flying and volunteered for pilot training, but was declared unfit for flying. He tried again and was given conditional permission (bedingt tauglich—with constraints) to begin flight training.

After his promotion to Oberfähnrich on 1 February 1934, Mölders began his pilot training at the Deutsche Verkehrsfliegerschule (German transport flying school) in Cottbus, lasting from 6 February 1934 to 31 December 1934. On 1 March 1934, he was promoted to Leutnant and assigned to the recently established Luftwaffe. In the early stages of his pilot training, he suffered continually from nausea and vomiting, but he eventually overcame these problems and finished the course at the top of his class. The next phase of his military pilot's training was from 1 January 1935 to 30 June 1935 at the combat flying school in Tutow and the Jagdfliegerschule (fighter pilot school) at Schleißheim near Munich. He received the newly created Pilot's Badge of the Luftwaffe on 21 May 1935.

On 1 July 1935, Leutnant Mölders was posted to Fliegergruppe Schwerin (I./JG 162 "Immelmann"). On 7 March 1936, during the remilitarisation of the Rhineland, Mölders and his squadron (Staffel) were moved to Düsseldorf. During this period, Mölders met Luise Baldauf, whom he was to marry a few years later, shortly before his death. On 20 April 1936, Adolf Hitler's birthday, numerous promotions were handed out, and Mölders advanced to Oberleutnant, effective as of 1 April 1936. At the same time, he became leader of the fighter training squadron of the 2nd Group of Jagdgeschwader 134 "Horst Wessel". This group was under the command of Major Theo Osterkamp, who became another of Mölders' early mentors. Mölders was appointed squadron leader (Staffelkapitän) of the 1st squadron of Jagdgeschwader 334 on 15 March 1937 and served as an instructor in Wiesbaden.

== Condor Legion ==
In 1936, the Germans sent a Luftwaffe force, the Condor Legion, to assist the Nationalists in the Spanish Civil War. Mölders volunteered for service, and arrived by sea in Cádiz on 14 April 1938. He was assigned to the 3. Staffel (3rd squadron) of Jagdgruppe 88 (J/88) commanded by Oberleutnant Adolf Galland. The unit, stationed at the Valencia–Ebro front, was equipped with the Heinkel He 51, but later switched to the Messerschmitt Bf 109. (Note: The Condor Legion used the Bf 109B through D variants during the conflict. This provided valuable combat experience for both the Luftwaffe and Messerschmitt leading up to the start of World War II. The He 51s were turned over to the 4th squadron, commanded by Hauptmann Eberhard d'Elsa, and continued in service until the end of the Spanish Civil War.) Mölders assumed command of the squadron on 24 May 1938, when Galland returned to Germany. He claimed his first aerial victory, shooting down a Polikarpov I-15 "Chato" ("Curtiss" to the Germans) near Algar, on 15 July 1938. Over the remaining months of the year, Mölders became the leading ace of the Condor Legion, claiming 15 aircraft in Spain: two I-15 "Curtiss", 12 I-16 "Rata" and one Tupolev SB (one "Rata" claimed on 23 September 1938 was not confirmed).

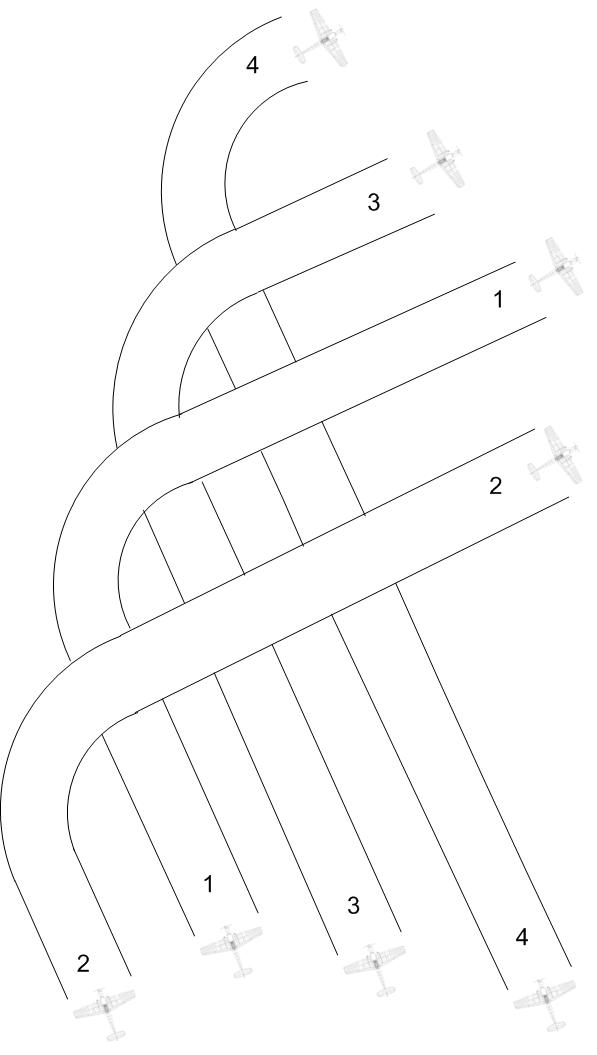
Schwarm formation and cross-over turn

In recognition of his exceptional performance as a commander and fighter pilot, Mölders was promoted to Hauptmann (Captain) on 18 October 1938, effective as of 1 October 1938. He claimed his 14th and final confirmed aerial victory of the conflict by downing a Polikarpov I-16 "Rata" near Mola on 3 November 1938. On 5 December, he passed on command of 3. Staffel to Hubertus von Bonin and flew from La Cenia back to Germany on a Junkers Ju 52. From 6 December 1938 until March 1939, Mölders was a member of the 1st group of Jagdgeschwader 133 (JG 133) and held a staff position with the Inspector of Fighters at the Ministry of Aviation in Berlin. His task was to devise new fighter pilot tactics. In March 1939 he was given command as Staffelkapitän of 1./JG 133, taking over command from Oberleutnant Hubertus von Bonin. JG 133 was later renamed Jagdgeschwader 53 Pik As (Ace of Spades). (Note: For an explanation of Luftwaffe unit designations see Organisation of the Luftwaffe during World War II.)

For his achievements in Spain, Mölders was honoured with the Spanish Medalla de la Campaña and Medalla Militar on 4 May 1939 and the German Spanish Cross in Gold with Swords and Diamonds (Spanienkreuz in Gold mit Schwertern und Brillanten) on 6 June 1939. The Condor Legion officially returned to Germany on 6 June 1939 and troops marched through Berlin to the Lustgarten, where the fallen were honoured. A formal state banquet for the most highly decorated soldiers was held in the marble gallery of the Reich Chancellery. Mölders was seated at table 1, with General der Flieger Hugo Sperrle, General Antonio Aranda, General Gonzalo Queipo de Llano, Oberst Walter Warlimont, Oberstleutnant Hans von Donat, Leutnant Reinhard Seiler and Oberfeldwebel Ignaz Prestele.

=== Tactical innovations ===
With other airmen in Spain, Mölders developed the formation known as the "finger-four". This improved the all-round field of vision and combat flexibility of a flight (Schwarm), enhanced mutual protection, and encouraged pilot initiative. In the "finger-four", the aircraft assumed positions corresponding to the fingertips of an outstretched hand. The fighters flew in two elements (Rotten) of two aircraft each; two Rotten (four aircraft) made up a Schwarm (swarm).

Mölders is often credited with inventing the cross-over turn. An early version of the manoeuvre, as used by a "Vic" of five aircraft (a tight formation forming the letter "V"), appeared in the Royal Air Force (RAF) Training Manual of 1922, and the manoeuvre may even date back to 1918. However, it had fallen into disuse due to the difficulty of performing it in a multi-aircraft formation with the contemporary spacing of less than 100 feet (30 m) between aircraft. The wide lateral separation of 1,800 feet (550 m) introduced by J 88 both necessitated such a turning manoeuvre, to enable a Schwarm to turn as a unit, and minimised the risk of midair collisions previously associated with it.

== World War II ==
=== Phoney War and the Battle of France ===
At the outbreak of World War II on 1 September 1939, Mölders' Staffel was stationed in the west protecting Germany's border in the Mosel–Saar–Pfalz region. On 8 September 1939, Mölders' fighter suffered an engine failure; he crash-landed, flipping the aircraft over and injuring his back. The injury kept him out of combat for several days. He returned to flying on 19 September. The following day, between Contz and Sierck, at the apex of the Dreiländereck, over the three borders area, he shot down his first aircraft of the war, a Curtiss P-36 (according to other historians, it was one of a trio of French Hawk H-75As), of Groupe de Chasse II/5 (Sgt Queginer bailed out). Thanks to that victory, he earned the Iron Cross 2nd Class (Eisernes Kreuz zweiter Klasse). He recalled his first victory:

I took off with my Schwarm at 14.27 hrs to intercept six enemy monoplanes reported south of Trier. As the Schwarm overflew the river Saar near Merzig at 4500 metres, six machines were sighted south of Conz at 5000 metres. I climbed above the enemy in a wide curve to the north and carried out a surprise attack on the rearmost machine. I opened fire from approximately 50 metres, whereupon the Curtiss began to fishtail. After a further lengthy burst, smoke came out of the machine and individual pieces flew off it. It then tipped forward into a dive and I lost sight of it, as I had to defend myself against other opponents newly arriving on the scene.

On 26 September 1939, JG 53 was ordered to form its III. Gruppe. Mölders relinquished command of 1./JG 53 to Oberleutnant Hans-Karl Mayer and organised the formation of III./JG 53 at Wiesbaden-Erbenheim Airfield; within two weeks, Gruppenkommandeur Mölders reported that the Gruppe was conditionally operational with 40 pilots and 48 aircraft.

On 22 December, Mölders, leading four Bf 109s from III./JG 53, engaged three Hawker Hurricanes over the Saar River, between Metz and Thionville, that were trying to intercept an unidentified aircraft. Mölders and Hans von Hahn shot down two Hurricanes flown by Sergeants R. M. Perry and J. Winn, becoming the first German fighter pilots to shoot down a Hawker Hurricane. Mölders shot down another Hurricane on 2 April, when he forced Flight Lieutenant C. D. "Pussy" Palmer of No. 1 Squadron RAF, to bail out, and on 20 April, he destroyed a French Curtiss P-36 Hawk (H-75A) east of Saarbrücken.

By the time the Phoney War ended and the invasion of France and the Low Countries (Fall Gelb) began on 10 May 1940, Mölders' tally of aerial victories on the Western Front had increased to nine. This number included one Bristol Blenheim, two Curtiss P-36 Hawks, two Morane-Saulnier M.S.406s and four Hawker Hurricanes. On 14 May, while engaging enemy bombers over Sedan, Mölders was shot down, but bailed out safely. He claimed his 19th and 20th victories on 27 May 1940, downing two Curtiss Hawks 15 kilometres (9.3 mi) southwest of Amiens. Subsequently, he became the first fighter pilot to be awarded the Knight's Cross of the Iron Cross (Ritterkreuz des Eisernen Kreuzes) and on 29 May 1940 was mentioned in the Wehrmachtbericht propaganda radio report, the first of 11 such mentions.

=== Prisoner of war ===
On 5 June 1940, on his 133rd combat mission of the war, engaging in aerial combat for the 32nd time, Mölders was shot down in his Bf 109 E-4 while engaged in aerial combat with French Air Force Dewoitine D.520s near Compiègne at about 18:40. Mölders was then captured by French soldiers and taken prisoner of war but liberated three weeks later upon the armistice with France. According to a variety of sources, which include Edward R. Hooton and Alex Kershaw, his victor was Sous lieutenant René Pomier Layrargues from Groupe de Chasse II/7, who was shot down and killed just after downing Mölders. Layrargues may have been shot down by Oberleutnant Gerhard Homuth from 3. Staffel of Jagdgeschwader 27 (JG 27).

Accounts regarding the events following his capture differ depending on the source. Ernst Obermaier and Werner Held, authors of the 1996 biography Fighter Pilot Colonel Werner Mölders – Images and Documents, state that while in French captivity, Mölders asked to shake hands with the pilot who had shot him down and learned that Pomier-Layrargues had been killed in action 30 minutes after their encounter. The authors claim that Mölders' initial experience in French captivity was harsh; he sustained abrasions to his face and his Knight's Cross was stolen from him. A French officer, Capitaine Giron, intervened, ensured he was treated fairly, and returned the stolen medal. When a French soldier was later sentenced to death by the Germans for beating Mölders, Mölders approached Hermann Göring and requested clemency, which was granted.

Kurt Braatz, author of Werner Mölders – The Biography, analysed the available German and French records associated to the events of Mölders being shot down, his capture and its aftermath. Braatz's investigation revealed that Mölders was not shot down by Pomier-Layrargues. More likely, he was shot down by other German fighters operating in the same area. Braatz confirmed that Mölders was beaten and stripped of his possessions following his capture. Also confirmed is his fair treatment after he was taken to a prisoner of war camp. However, the story about the French soldier who was sentenced to death and later pardoned by Göring is very likely fictitious.

Klaus Schmider, author of Werner Mölders and the Bundeswehr, states that his victor may have been Pomier-Layrargues. However, Schmider also acknowledges the research done by Braatz, indicating that Mölders could also have been shot down by Germans. French records held at Oise reveal that initially eight civilians had been arrested for the Mölders beating and only one, Edmond Maurice Caron, was brought before a Luftwaffe court. Caron was sentenced to twelve years imprisonment later commuted to six years. The records also show that Michel Duchènes, a local factory owner, contacted Göring's staff in early 1941. Contact with Kriegsgerichtsrat (Judge Advocate) Hans-Jürgen Soehring at the Luftwaffe headquarters in Paris was established on 6 March 1941. On 24 March, Mölders informed Duchènes that he had already done all he could for Caron. Duchènes again contacted Mölders on 17 July 1941. Caron, who should have been released on 19 November 1946, was released from the Rheinbach prison on 9 February 1942. Caron's release records in Oise state "Pardoned by Marshal Göring at the request of Colonel Mölders, who had requested this before his death."

=== Battle of Britain ===
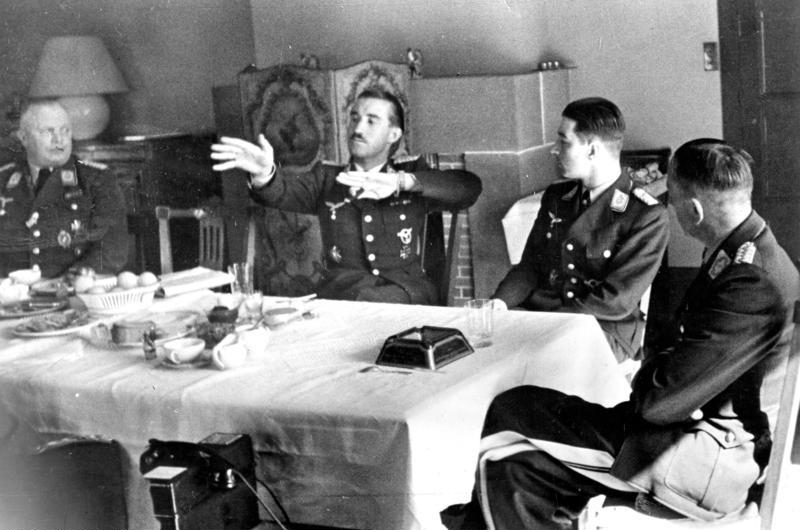
Theo Osterkamp's birthday party on 15 April 1941; from left to right: Major Wenzel (Mölders' aide), Adolf Galland, Mölders and Osterkamp

Returning to Germany, Mölders was promoted to Major on 19 July 1940 and the following day was informed that he was given command of Jagdgeschwader 51 (JG 51) from the recently promoted Generalmajor Osterkamp. On 26 July, Mölders took command of JG 51 and flew from Brandenburg-Briest to the French coast on the English Channel. At the time, JG 51 were based at the Saint-Inglevert Airfield, Pas-de-Calais, France. Mölders flew his first combat sortie with JG 51 on 28 July, attacking a No. 41 Squadron RAF Supermarine Spitfire flown by Flying Officer Tony Lovell. On this mission, according to legend, Mölders was hit in a dogfight over Dover by the South African ace Sailor Malan, sustaining three splinter wounds in the lower leg, one in the knee and one in the left foot. Oberleutnant Richard Leppla shot down the pursuing Spitfire, and Mölders was able to make an emergency landing at Wissant, France. Recent research suggests Mölders was actually wounded in combat by Flight Lieutenant John Webster in a Spitfire of No. 41 Squadron RAF. Webster was killed in action on 5 September 1940. Mölders' wounds, although not serious, kept him from further operational flying for a month. Generalmajor Osterkamp briefly led the Geschwader again during Mölders' convalescence. On 7 August 1940, Mölders returned to the Geschwader without medical clearance for combat, to participate in Operation Eagle Attack (code name Adlertag). Hitler had issued Führer Directive no. 17 on 1 August 1940; the strategic objective was to engage and defeat the RAF so as to achieve air superiority in preparation for Operation Sea Lion (Unternehmen Seelöwe), the proposed amphibious invasion of Great Britain.

Mölders returned to approved operational flying status and flew his next two combat missions on 28 August 1940. His aide and wingman, Oberleutnant Kircheis, was shot down and taken prisoner during one of these missions; Oberleutnant Georg Claus took his place. Mölders claimed three Hurricanes on 31 August and was mentioned again in the Wehrmachtbericht. Oberleutnant Victor Mölders, his younger brother, who had been appointed Staffelkapitän of the 2./JG 51 on 11 September, was shot down by Archie McKellar and taken prisoner of war on 7 October 1940. Two Spitfires of No. 92 Squadron RAF (Sgt PR Eyles and P/O HP Hill, both killed), shot down near Dungeness on 20 September, increased Mölders' tally of aerial victories to 40. He was the first fighter pilot to reach this number during the war and was awarded the 2nd Knight's Cross of the Iron Cross with Oak Leaves (Ritterkreuz des Eisernen Kreuzes mit Eichenlaub) on 21 September 1940. The award was presented by Adolf Hitler on 23 September in the Reich Chancellery in Berlin. After the award ceremony, Hermann Göring invited Mölders to his hunting lodge in the Rominter Heide.

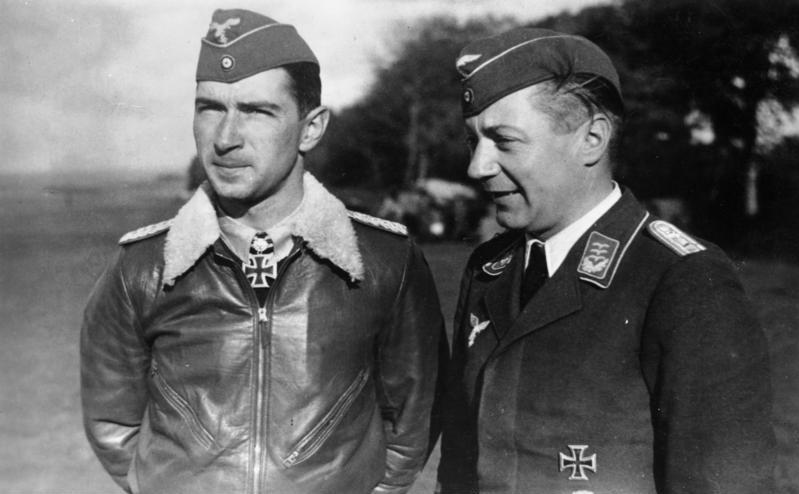
Mölders with Arthur Laumann in September 1940

Mölders returned to his unit by the end of September and continued to win aerial victories. On 11 October, Mölders claimed his 43rd victory. The No. 66 Squadron RAF Spitfire I X4562 was flown by Pilot Officer J. H. T. Pickering, who bailed out, wounded, over Canterbury. Three Hurricanes on 12 October brought his tally to 51 victories, and he received a preferential promotion to Oberstleutnant in recognition of his 50 victories on 25 October 1940. While a severe bout of influenza then kept him grounded for a few weeks, his wingman in over 60 aerial combats, Oberleutnant Georg Claus, was killed over the Thames. On 1 December, Mölders claimed his last and 55th victory of 1940, 25 of which occurred in the Battle of France and 30 in the Battle of Britain.

Mölders and members of JG 53 spent a couple of weeks of R&R skiing in the Vorarlberg before continuing operations against the RAF over the Channel and occupied France during early 1941. His new wingman from January 1941 was Oberleutnant Hartmann Grasser. Mölders claimed his first aerial victory after the lengthy vacation on 10 February 1941; his tally reached 60 on 26 February and stood at 68 when the Geschwader was recalled from the Channel front. His logbook showed 238 combat missions plus an additional 71 reconnaissance flights; he had engaged in aerial combat 70 times.

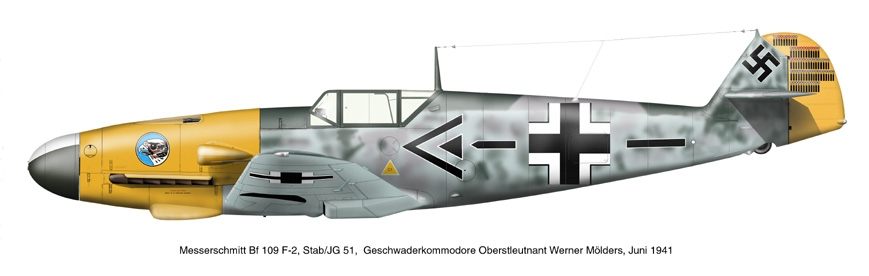
Messerschmitt Bf 109 F-2, Stab/JG 51, Geschwaderkommodore Oberstleutnant Werner Mölders, June 1941

=== Eastern Front ===
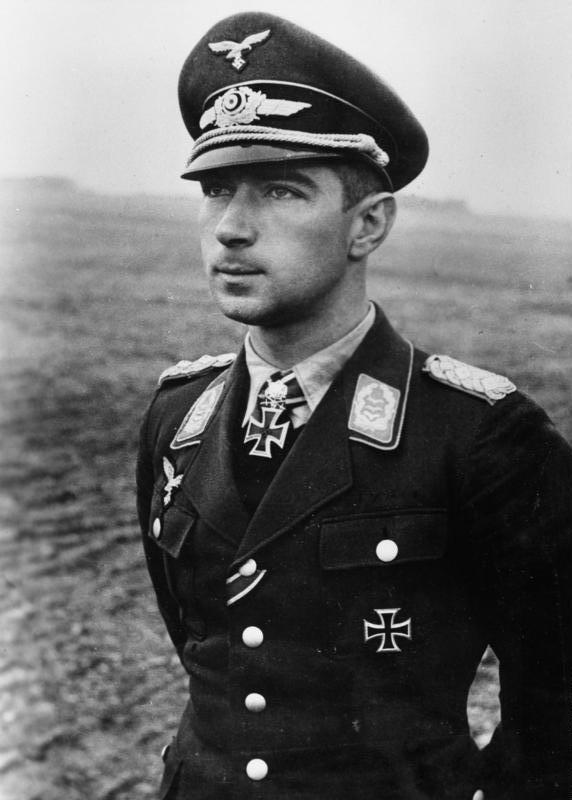
Mölders in 1941

In June 1941, JG 51 and the majority of the Luftwaffe were transferred to the Eastern Front in preparation for Operation Barbarossa, the invasion of the Soviet Union. JG 51 was subordinated to II. Fliegerkorps (2nd Air Corps), which as part of Luftflotte 2 (Air Fleet 2). JG 51 area of operation during Operation Barbarossa was over the right flank of Army Group Center in the combat area of the 2nd Panzer Group as well as the 4th Army.

On the first day of combat operations, 22 June 1941, Mölders shot down three Tupolev SB bombers and one Curtis Hawk, earning him the Knight's Cross of the Iron Cross with Oak Leaves and Swords (Ritterkreuz des Eisernen Kreuzes mit Eichenlaub und Schwertern). Mölders was only the second German serviceman to receive this award; Galland, the Geschwaderkommodore of Jagdgeschwader 26 "Schlageter" (JG 26), had received one the day before. The award was presented by Adolf Hitler on 3 July 1941 in the Wolfsschanze Hitler's Headquarters in Rastenburg. On 30 June, Mölders had become the highest-scoring fighter pilot in the history of aerial warfare after downing five Soviet bombers and bringing his tally to 82, two more than the record set in World War I by the "Red Baron", Manfred von Richthofen.

On 12 July 1941, JG 51 under the leadership of Mölders reported that it had destroyed 500 Soviet aircraft since the beginning of hostilities against the Soviets on 22 June, and had suffered three casualties. That day, JG 51 also reported its 1,200th aerial victory of the war, the credit going to Hauptmann Leppla. Three days later, on 15 July 1941, Mölders surpassed the C mark, claiming victories Nos. 100 and 101, and celebrated with a victory roll over the airfield. He was the first fighter pilot to amass 100 aerial victories in World War II. The following day he received news that he had been awarded the Knight's Cross of the Iron Cross with Oak Leaves, Swords and Diamonds (Ritterkreuz des Eisernen Kreuzes mit Eichenlaub, Schwertern und Brillanten). Mölders was the first of 27 German servicemen to receive this award. The diamonds added to the Knight's Cross were introduced officially on 28 September 1941, more than two months after Mölders earned the award. Mölders was promoted to Oberst on 20 July 1941, effective immediately, and banned from further combat flying. Surrendering command of JG 51 to Major Friedrich Beckh he was transferred to the Ministry of Aviation, a temporary position he held until 6 August 1941. Mölders was summoned to the Wolfsschanze again, where he received the Diamonds from Adolf Hitler on 26 July 1941. On 7 August 1941, he was appointed Inspector of Fighters.

=== High command ===
An Oberst at 28, Mölders' appointment as Inspector of Fighters meant he was responsible for deciding the ongoing tactical and operational doctrine of the Luftwaffe's fighter arm. Returning to the Soviet Union in September 1941, he set up a command post at Chaplinka airfield, from where he flew in his personal Fieseler Fi 156 Storch on tours of the Jagdwaffe and personally directed German fighter operations.

Mölders also flew unofficially on missions, and actively commanded his old unit, JG 51, for several more months. On 9 November 1941, he took Herbert Kaiser on a "teaching" mission against a formation of Il-2 Sturmoviks. Mölders showed Kaiser how to shoot them down. He recalled later: "He positioned himself off to one side of-and some distance away from-the last Il-2 in a formation of six. He then turned in quickly and opened fire at the enemy's cockpit from an angle of some 30 degrees. The Il-2 immediately burst into flames and crashed. 'Do you see how it's done?', Oberst Mölders' voice came over the R/T. 'Right, now you take the next one.' I carried out the same manoeuvre and, sure enough, the next Il-2 went down on fire. 'And again!' It was like being on a training flight. Another short burst and the third Il-2 was ablaze. The whole lesson had lasted no more than 12 minutes!" In this way, Kaiser scored his 23rd and 24th kills. But because Mölders was officially banned from operational flying, the first Soviet aircraft was never officially credited to him. Within the next two months, it is speculated that Mölders unofficially shot down around another 30 Soviet aircraft. At least six of Mölders' unofficial victories are recorded in his fellow pilots' private log books.

=== Death ===
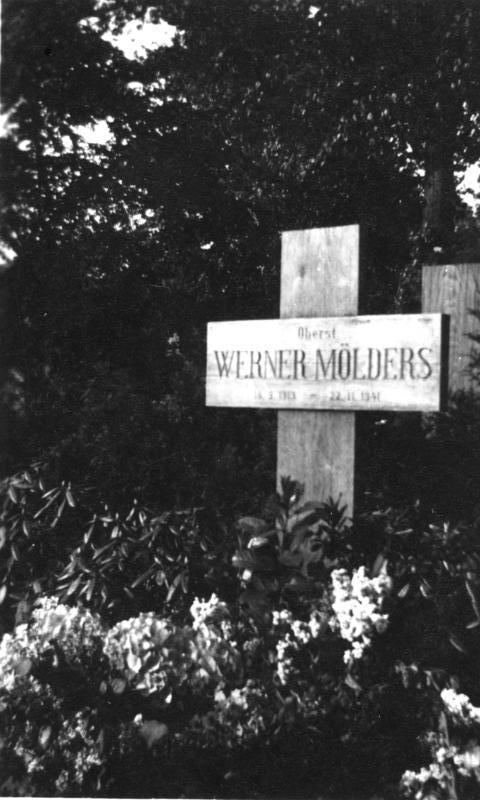
Werner Mölders' original grave marker, 1941

On 22 November 1941, Mölders travelled as a passenger in a Heinkel He 111 of Kampfgeschwader 27 "Boelcke" from Crimea to Germany to attend the funeral of his superior, Ernst Udet, who had committed suicide. Attempting to land at Breslau, now Wrocław, during a thunderstorm, the aircraft crashed. Mölders, pilot Oberleutnant Kolbe and flight engineer Oberfeldwebel Hobbie were killed. Major Dr. Wenzel and radio operator Oberfeldwebel Tenz survived the crash landing. Dr. Wenzel sustained a broken arm and leg as well as a concussion, and Tenz a broken ankle. Mölders' fatal injuries included a broken back and a crushed ribcage. Accident investigators then and since have speculated whether Mölders would have survived the crash if he had used his seat belt.

Mölders was given a state funeral in Berlin on 28 November 1941. His coffin was laid out in the honour court of the Imperial Air Ministry. The guard of honour consisted of Johann Schalk, Günther Lützow, Walter Oesau, Joachim Müncheberg, Adolf Galland, Wolfgang Falck, Herbert Kaminski and Karl-Gottfried Nordmann. Mölders was buried next to Udet and Richthofen at the Invalidenfriedhof in Berlin. The 8.8 cm flak in Berlin Tiergarten fired a salute; Göring gave the eulogy.

== Personal life ==
Mölders's nickname was "Vati" (Daddy). He was a devoutly religious individual.

"He was a marvelous tactician. My admiration for him was boundless. He had a great wit and great personality."

— Günther Rall

Mölders married Luise Baldauf, née Thurner, the widow of a friend who had been killed in active service, on 13 September 1941. Erich Klawitter, Mölders' childhood mentor, performed the religious ceremony in Falkenstein, Taunus. The marriage produced a posthumous daughter, Verena.

Nazi officials disapproved of his choice of a Catholic marriage ceremony, performed by Klawitter. Klawitter had been barred from membership in the Reich Chamber of Culture and was considered politically unreliable after a 1936 breach of the Pulpit Law, a remnant of the 1870s Kulturkampf that among other religions barred Catholics from criticizing the state from the pulpit.

== In propaganda ==
Werner Mölders' old unit, Jagdgeschwader 51, was renamed "Mölders" in his honour, on 22 November 1941, only hours after his death. Its members were entitled to wear the "Mölders" cuffband.

Mölders' death, just shortly after Udet's own suicide, was used by Sefton Delmer, the chief of the British black propaganda in the Political Warfare Executive (PWE), as part of a counter-propaganda campaign. His idea was to use Mölders' popularity in Germany by airdropping the Möldersbrief (Mölders-letter), a copy of correspondence supposedly written by Mölders to the provost of Schwerin, to create the assumption that Mölders' strong Catholic beliefs led him to oppose the Nazi regime in Germany. The letter did not bluntly call for opposition against the state and never mentioned the Nazi Party by name, instead using metaphors like "the godless". It stated that, especially in the face of death, many supporters of Nazism still found strength and courage with Catholicism.

The letter caused a stir in the upper echelons of the Nazi regime. In his diaries, Joseph Goebbels, Reich Minister of Propaganda, assumed that someone in the German Catholic church organisation wrote, and distributed, the letter. A bounty of 100,000 Reichsmarks was posted in Hitler's name, but it revealed no clues to its origins. In the end, these actions did not affect the distribution of the letter.

== Commemoration and reversal of honours ==
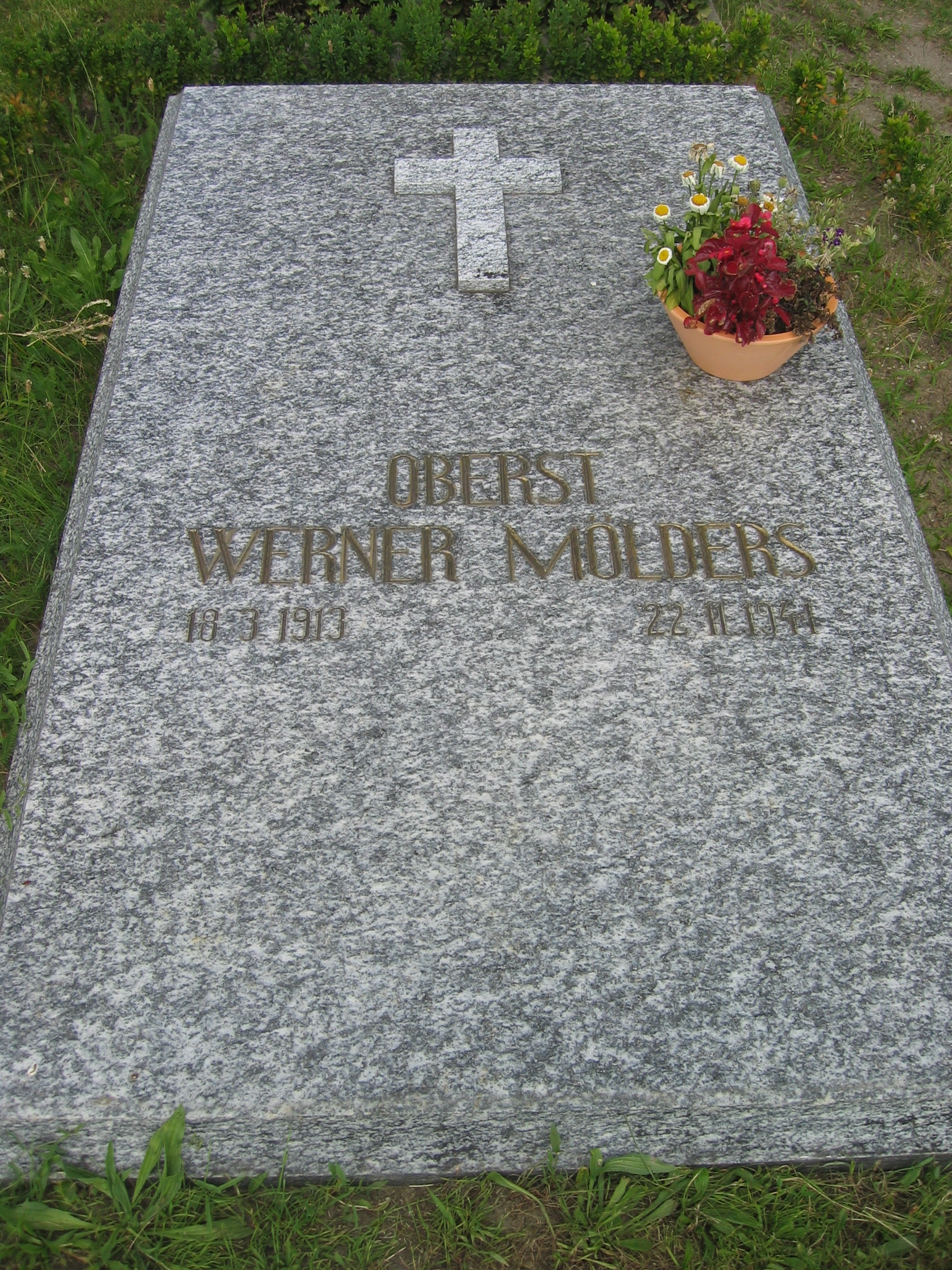
Werner Mölders re-established grave site (1991) in the Invalidenfriedhof Berlin

The Invalidenfriedhof, where Mölders is buried, lay in East Berlin and in 1975 East German officials ordered all the graves leveled. After the 1990 German reunification, Mölders' grave was rebuilt and rededicated on 11 October 1991 by Mölders' school friend and canon (Domherr) of the St. Hedwig's Cathedral, Heribert Rosal. The ceremony was witnessed by guests from the United States, Great Britain, Austria, Spain and Hungary.

On 13 April 1968, a destroyer of the West German Navy was christened Mölders in Bath, Maine (USA). It was in service between 1969 and 2003. As of 2018, it is the central attraction at the German Navy Museum in Wilhelmshaven. On 9 November 1972, a base of a battalion of the 34th Signal Regiment of the Bundeswehr in Visselhövede received the name "Mölders". The Fighter Wing 74 (Jagdgeschwader 74), stationed in Neuburg an der Donau, received the name "Mölders" in 1973. Fellow ace Günther Rall, now a general, presented the cuffbands.

In 1998, on the occasion of the 61st anniversary of the bombing of the Spanish town of Guernica during the Spanish Civil War, the German Parliament decided that members of the Condor Legion, such as Mölders, should "no longer be honoured". In 2005, the Federal Ministry of Defence decided to remove the name "Mölders" from JG 74. The decision was confirmed on 11 March 2005 by the Federal Minister of Defence Peter Struck, and at 10:00, the flags and cufftitles were removed.

Mölders' supporters challenged the ruling. They pointed to his equivocal political attitude towards Nazism and his commitment to Catholicism; not only did he have a Catholic religious marriage ceremony but Klawitter, regarded by the Third Reich as politically "unreliable," had performed the ceremony. Despite petitions from politicians and high-ranking active and retired servicemen, among them Horst Seehofer, Rall and Jörg Kuebart, the Office for Military History (MGFA) noted that Mölders' membership in the Bund Neudeutschland did not provide sufficient evidence of his having been critical of the regime, but rather showed the contrary and concluded that it was questionable whether Mölders had distanced himself enough from Nazism before his death in 1941. Consequently, the decision remained in force.

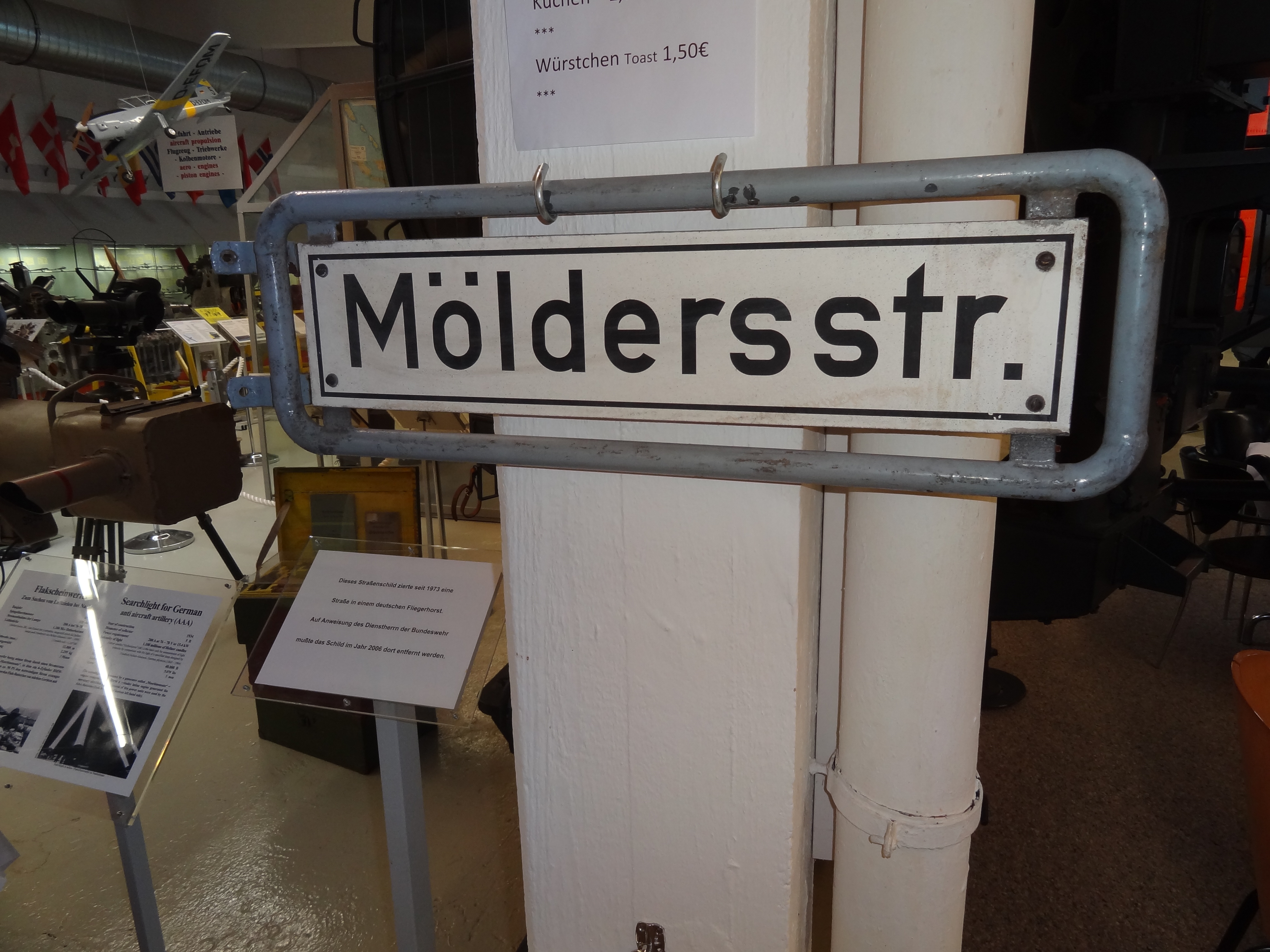
This street sign was removed from a German air base following the reversal of honours. It is on display at the Aviation Museum Hannover-Laatzen.

Other evidence has surfaced illustrating Mölders' ambiguous relationship with the Nazi regime. Mölders may have been in contact with Bishop Clemens August Graf von Galen, who was highly critical of the Nazi regime. Von Galen publicly criticised the regime for the Gestapo's tactics and the deportation and euthanasia of the mentally ill. According to the diary kept by Heinrich Portmann, von Galen's secretary and chaplain, Mölders threatened to return his awards if von Galen's euthanasia accusation turned out to be true. Furthermore, Portmann stated that Hitler had asked Mölders during the presentation of the Diamonds to the Knight's Cross if there was anything he wished for. Mölders reportedly responded, "Please leave the bishop of Münster alone." Hitler assured him that "Yes, nothing will happen to the bishop of Münster." The MGFA concluded in 2004 that this story was most likely false. The MGFA revised its position again on 28 June 2007, concluding that there had been contact between Mölders and von Galen.

According to Viktor Mölders, his brother had saved Georg Küch, one of Werner Mölders' closest friends, who had been classified as a half-Jew by the Nuremberg Laws. Küch's mother, Alice née Siegel, was of Jewish birth. Küch's father, Richard Küch, owned and operated a pharmacy in Brandenburg. Georg, himself a pharmacy student, was expelled from university under the Nuremberg Laws. In 1940, Richard Küch fell ill, and owning and operating the pharmacy became a bureaucratic problem for the family. Georg Küch contacted his friend Mölders in mid-February 1941, asking for help. Werner Mölders wrote back that he had taken care of the matter. When Richard Küch died in June 1941, his wife was able to sell the pharmacy for fair market value. Normally, since she was Jewish, it would have been confiscated. Friedel Küch repeatedly claimed that Werner Mölders had been responsible for protecting the family; the mantle of his protection had persisted beyond his death. The MGFA ruled this assertion "highly speculative," and did not investigate further.

In 2004, the MGFA concluded that the assumption Mölders had distanced himself from the Nazi regime was not demonstrable by a concrete behavioral action pattern. Additionally, it was assumed that he had deliberately and repeatedly attacked civilian targets in Spain. The MGFA expert had built his analysis on the provability of concrete actions or omissions. According to Schmider, these conclusions have now been negated by recent research. In the light of these new findings, Mölders cannot be attributed with any personal wrongdoing or even associated with a war crime, even during his engagement in the Spanish Civil War. Schmider states that Mölders campaigned for victims of Nazi persecution and, in particular, helped the Küch family far beyond what most Germans were prepared to do. However, Schmider recommends that future research should focus on Mölders perception and interpretation of Operation Barbarossa, in particular his view on the Commissar Order needs to be investigated. Schmider speculates that Mölders may have been informed about the Commissar Order. During Operation Barbarossa, JG 51 was subordinated to II. Fliegerkorps under the command of General der Flieger Bruno Loerzer, which was part of Luftflotte 2, commanded by Generalfeldmarschall Albert Kesselring. Schmider assumes that Mölders was either informed of the Commissar Order at the headquarters of the Fliegerkorps in Otwock or by the Luftflotte in Warsaw just prior to the invasion of the Soviet Union.

The street "Möldersstraße" in Geilenkirchen and Ingolstadt were named after him. In 2005, the city council in Geilenkirchen rejected a request to rename the "Möldersstraße". The request had been submitted by the Alliance 90/The Greens party while the majority in the city council was held by the Christian Democratic Union of Germany.

== Summary of career ==
=== Aerial victory claims ===
According to US historian David T. Zabecki, Mölders was credited with 115 aerial victories, 14 of which during the Spanish Civil War. Spick also lists him with 115 aerial victories claimed in over 300 combat missions, and a mission-to-claim ratio of 2.61. Stockert lists him with 102 enemy aircraft shot down in 642 combat missions, of which 63 were claimed over the Western Front. Mathews and Foreman, authors of Luftwaffe Aces — Biographies and Victory Claims, researched the German Federal Archives and found documentation for 108 aerial victory claims, plus ten further unconfirmed claims. This number includes 14 claims during the Spanish Civil War, 62 on the Western Front, and 32 on the Eastern Front.

Chronicle of aerial victories
This and the ♠ (Ace of spades) indicates those aerial victories which made Mölders an "ace-in-a-day", a term which designates a fighter pilot who has shot down five or more airplanes in a single day. This and the – (dash) indicates unconfirmed aerial victory claims for which Mölders did not receive credit. This and the ! (exclamation mark) indicates those aerial victories listed by Forsyth or by Prien, Stemmer, Rodeike and Bock. This and the # (hash mark) indicates those aerial victories listed by Mathews and Foreman. This and the ? (question mark) indicates information discrepancies listed by Prien, Stemmer, Rodeike, Bock, Mathews and Foreman.
Claim!	Claim#	Date	Time	Type	Location	Unit	Claim!	Claim#	Date	Time	Type	Location	Unit
Spanish Civil War
– Claims with Jagdgruppe 88 in Spain –
1	1	15 July 1938	—	I-15	Algar de Palancia area	3. J/88		—	23 September 1938	—	I-16		3. J/88
2	2	17 July 1938	—	I-15	north of Llíria	3. J/88	9	9	10 October 1938	—	I-16	northeast of Flix	3. J/88
3	3	19 July 1938	—	I-16	west of Villar del Arzobispo	3. J/88	10	10	15 October 1938	—	I-16	west of La Figuera	3. J/88
4	4	19 August 1938	—	I-16	Flix area	3. J/88	11	11	15 October 1938	—	I-16	Serra de Montsant area	3. J/88
5	5	23 August 1938	—	SB-2	Albi area	3. J/88	12	12	31 October 1938	—	I-16	northwest of Flix	3. J/88
6	6	9 September 1938	—	I-16	Flix area	3. J/88	13	13	31 October 1938	—	I-16	south of Ribarroja	3. J/88
7	7	13 September 1938	—	I-16	Flix area	3. J/88	14	14	3 November 1938	—	I-16	Mola area	3. J/88
8	8	23 September 1938	—	I-16	southwest of Ginestar	3. J/88							
World War II
– Claims with Jagdgeschwader 53 on the Western Front– "Phoney War" — 1 September 1939 – 9 May 1940
1	15	20 September 1939	14:30? (Note: According to Mathews and Foreman claimed at 14:50.)	P-36	Sierck-les-Bains	1./JG 53	6	20	26 March 1940	15:00	M.S.406	Wolkenfeld; Diedenhofen	III./JG 53
2	16	30 October 1939	11:12	Blenheim	Klüsserath, northeast of Trier	III./JG 53	7	21	2 April 1940	12:10	Hurricane	south of Saargemünd	III./JG 53
3	17	22 December 1939	15:05	M.S.406	15 km (9.3 mi) northeast of Metz	III./JG 53	8	22	20 April 1940	11:54	P-36	7 km (4.3 mi) east of Saargemünd	III./JG 53
4	18	2 March 1940	12:20? (Note: According to Mathews and Foreman claimed at 12:15.)	Hurricane	south of Bitsch; Völklingen	III./JG 53	9	23	23 April 1940	11:14	Hurricane	south of Diedenhofen	III./JG 53
5	19	3 March 1940	13:55	M.S.406	12 km (7.5 mi) southeast of Diedenhofen	III./JG 53							
– Claims with Jagdgeschwader 53 in France – Battle of France — 10 May – 25 June 1940
10	24	14 May 1940	16:30	Hurricane	Sedan; Sedan-Charleville	III./JG 53	18	31	25 May 1940	18:55	M.S.406	Forest of Compiègne; Villers-Cotterêts forest	III./JG 53
11	25	15 May 1940	13:05	Hurricane	Charleville; Sedan	III./JG 53	19	32	27 May 1940	09:10	P-36	15 km (9.3 mi) southwest of Amiens	III./JG 53
12	26	19 May 1940	09:35	MB.152	northeast of Reims	III./JG 53	20	33	27 May 1940	09:11	P-36	15 km (9.3 mi) southwest of Amiens	III./JG 53
13	27	20 May 1940	19:15	Wellesley	Compiègne	III./JG 53	21	34	31 May 1940	19:00? (Note: According to Mathews and Foreman claimed at 19:55.)	LeO 451	30 km (19 mi) south of Abbeville	III./JG 53
14	28	21 May 1940	17:30	M.S.406	southwest of Compiègne	III./JG 53	22	35	3 June 1940	14:30? (Note: According to Mathews and Foreman claimed at 15:00.)	P-36	Paris	III./JG 53
15	—	21 May 1940	17:50	M.S.406	southwest of Compiègne	III./JG 53	23	36	3 June 1940	14:40	Spitfire	southeast of Paris	III./JG 53
16	29	21 May 1940	19:18	M.S.406	southwest of Compiègne	III./JG 53	24	37	5 June 1940	11:20	Bloch	west of Compiègne	III./JG 53
17	30	22 May 1940	17:50	Potez 63	southwest of Mourmelon airfield	III./JG 53	25	38	5 June 1940	11:23	Potez 63	northwest of Pont-Sainte-Maxence; Beauvais-Compiègne	III./JG 53
– Claims with Jagdgeschwader 51 during the Battle of Britain and on the English Channel –
26	—	28 July 1940	15:30	Spitfire	Dover	Stab/JG 51	48	59	17 October 1940	16:22	Spitfire	London	Stab/JG 51
27	—	26 August 1940	12:55	Spitfire	Folkestone	Stab/JG 51	49	60	22 October 1940	15:40	Hurricane	northwest of Maidstone	Stab/JG 51
28	39	28 August 1940	10:05	P-36	northeast of Dover	Stab/JG 51	50	61	22 October 1940	15:41	Hurricane	northwest of Maidstone	Stab/JG 51
29	40	28 August 1940	18:25	Hurricane	Canterbury	Stab/JG 51	51	62	22 October 1940	15:42	Hurricane	northwest of Maidstone	Stab/JG 51
30	41	31 August 1940	10:00	Hurricane	northeast of Folkestone	Stab/JG 51	52	63	25 October 1940	10:45	Spitfire	northwest of Dover	Stab/JG 51
31	42	31 August 1940	10:01	Hurricane	northeast of Folkestone	Stab/JG 51	53	64	25 October 1940	13:20	Spitfire	Margate	Stab/JG 51
32	43	31 August 1940	10:10	Hurricane	northeast of Folkestone	Stab/JG 51	54	65	29 October 1940	13:55	Hurricane	Dungeness	Stab/JG 51
33	44	6 September 1940	14:45	Spitfire	Folkestone	Stab/JG 51	55	66	1 December 1940	15:15	Hurricane	Ashford	Stab/JG 51
34	45	7 September 1940	18:32	Spitfire	London	Stab/JG 51	56	67	10 February 1941	17:29	Spitfire	5 km (3.1 mi) northeast of Calais; 5 km (3.1 mi) nort-northwest of Calais	Stab/JG 51
35	46	9 September 1940	18:45	Spitfire	London	Stab/JG 51	57	—	20 February 1941	16:56	Spitfire	Dover	Stab/JG 51
36	47	11 September 1940	17:10	Hurricane	southeast of London	Stab/JG 51	58	68	20 February 1941	16:57	Spitfire	Dover	Stab/JG 51
37	48	14 September 1940	17:30	Spitfire	southwest of London	Stab/JG 51	59	—	25 February 1941	15:20	Spitfire	north of Gravelines	Stab/JG 51
38	49	16 September 1940	09:24	Hurricane	south of London	Stab/JG 51	60	69	26 February 1941	18:37	Spitfire	southeast of Dungeness	Stab/JG 51
39	50	20 September 1940	12:34	Spitfire	Dungeness	Stab/JG 51	61	—	12 March 1941	19:15	Spitfire	Dungeness	Stab/JG 51
40	51	20 September 1940	12:35	Spitfire	Dungeness	Stab/JG 51	62	70	13 March 1941	15:22	Spitfire	20 km (12 mi) west of Cap Gris-Nez southwest of Boulogne	Stab/JG 51
41	52	27 September 1940	17:03	Spitfire	Maidstone	Stab/JG 51	63	—	15 April 1941	18:00	Spitfire	southwest of Boulogne	Stab/JG 51
42	53	28 September 1940	15:01	Spitfire	Littlestone	Stab/JG 51	64	71	16 April 1941	18:32	Spitfire	5 km (3.1 mi) west of Berck	Stab/JG 51
43	54	11 October 1940	12:30	Spitfire	Folkestone	Stab/JG 51	65	72	16 April 1941	18:42	Hurricane	southwest of Dungeness	Stab/JG 51
44	55	12 October 1940	10:40	Hurricane	Lympne; Lympne-Canterbury	Stab/JG 51	—	73	28 April 1941	13:10	Hurricane	Dungeness	Stab/JG 51
45	56	12 October 1940	10:43	Hurricane	Canterbury; Lympne-Canterbury	Stab/JG 51	66	74	4 May 1941	12:17	Hurricane	east of Deal	Stab/JG 51
46	57	12 October 1940	14:12	Hurricane	Dungeness	Stab/JG 51	67	75	6 May 1941	12:00	Hurricane	Dover	Stab/JG 51
47	58	15 October 1940	09:15	Hurricane	south of London; Kenley	Stab/JG 51	68	76	8 May 1941	12:20	Spitfire	off Dover	Stab/JG 51
– Claims with Jagdgeschwader 51 on the Eastern Front – Operation Barbarossa — 22 June – 5 December 1941
69	77	22 June 1941	05:00	I-153		Stab/JG 51	86	94	5 July 1941	12:10	I-18 (MiG-1)		Stab/JG 51
70	78	22 June 1941	12:35	SB-2		Stab/JG 51	87	95	9 July 1941	09:25	I-153		Stab/JG 51
71	79	22 June 1941	12:36	SB-2		Stab/JG 51	88	96	9 July 1941	09:35	I-153		Stab/JG 51
72	80	22 June 1941	12:38	SB-2		Stab/JG 51	89	97	9 July 1941	09:55	I-16		Stab/JG 51
73	81	24 June 1941	17:50	SB-2		Stab/JG 51	90	98	10 July 1941	07:45	R-Z? (Note: According to Mathews and Foreman claimed as a Polikarpov R-5.)		Stab/JG 51
74	82	25 June 1941	12:30	SB-2		Stab/JG 51	91	99	10 July 1941	07:50	R-Z?		Stab/JG 51
75	83	25 June 1941	12:31	SB-2		Stab/JG 51	92	100	11 July 1941	10:35	I-153		Stab/JG 51
76	84	29 June 1941	15:30	Pe-2		Stab/JG 51	93	101	11 July 1941	15:15	I-153		Stab/JG 51
77	85	29 June 1941	19:50	I-16		Stab/JG 51	94	102	12 July 1941	18:50	DB-3		Stab/JG 51
78♠	86	30 June 1941	11:40	DB-3		Stab/JG 51	95	103	13 July 1941	19:25	DB-3		Stab/JG 51
79♠	87	30 June 1941	11:45	DB-3		Stab/JG 51	96	104	13 July 1941	19:30	DB-3		Stab/JG 51
80♠	88	30 June 1941	11:50	DB-3		Stab/JG 51	97	105	14 July 1941	11:50	Pe-2		Stab/JG 51
81♠	89	30 June 1941	15:45	DB-3		Stab/JG 51	98	106	14 July 1941	11:55	Pe-2		Stab/JG 51
82♠	90	30 June 1941	15:50	DB-3		Stab/JG 51	99	107	14 July 1941	12:00	Pe-2		Stab/JG 51
83	91	5 July 1941	12:00	SB-2		Stab/JG 51	100	108	15 July 1941	18:40	Pe-2		Stab/JG 51
84	92	5 July 1941	12:05	SB-2		Stab/JG 51	101	—	15 July 1941	—	Pe-2		Stab/JG 51
85	93	5 July 1941	12:10	I-18 (MiG-1)		Stab/JG 51							
– Claims with Jagdgeschwader 77 on the Eastern Front – Operation Barbarossa — 22 June – 5 December 1941
—	—	8 November 1941	—	Il-2		III./JG 77							

=== Awards ===
- Wehrmacht Long Service Award 4th Class (2 October 1936)
- Medal for the Campaign of 1936−1939 (Medalla de la Campaña 1936−1939 or Medalla de la Campaña) (Spain, 4 May 1939)
- Military Medal (Medalla Militar) (Spain, 4 May 1939)
- Spanish Cross in Gold with Swords and Diamonds (6 June 1939)
- Front Flying Clasp of the Luftwaffe for Fighter Pilots in Gold and Diamonds
- Wound Badge in Black
- Pilot/Observer Badge in Gold with Diamonds (August 1940)
- Iron Cross (1939)
  - 2nd Class (20 September 1939) (Note: According to Thomas on 27 September 1939.)
  - 1st Class (2 April 1940) (Note: According to Thomas on 3 April 1940.)
- Knight's Cross of the Iron Cross with Oak Leaves, Swords and Diamonds
  - Knight's Cross (29 May 1940) as Hauptmann and Gruppenkommandeur of III./Jagdgeschwader 53
  - 2nd Oak Leaves (21 September 1940) as Major and Geschwaderkommodore of Jagdgeschwader 51
  - 2nd Swords (22 June 1941) as Oberstleutnant and Geschwaderkommodore of Jagdgeschwader 51
  - 1st Diamonds (15 July 1941) as Oberst and Geschwaderkommodore of Jagdgeschwader 51 (Note: According to Scherzer 1st Diamonds on 16 July 1941.)
- Eleven named references in the Wehrmachtbericht (29 May 1940, 6 September 1940, 25 September 1940, 23 October 1940, 26 October 1940, 11 February 1941, 27 February 1941, 18 April 1941, 24 June 1941, 1 July 1941, 16 July 1941)

=== Promotions ===
1 October 1931:	Fahnenjunker-Gefreiter
1 April 1932:	Fahnenjunker-Unteroffizier
1 June 1933:	Fähnrich
1 February 1934:	Oberfähnrich
1 March 1934:	Leutnant (Second Lieutenant)
20 April 1936:	Oberleutnant (First Lieutenant), effective as of 1 April 1936
18 October 1938:	Hauptmann (Captain), effective as of 1 October 1938
19 July 1940:	Major (Major)
25 October 1940:	Oberstleutnant (Lieutenant Colonel)
20 July 1941:	Oberst (Colonel)

Military offices
Preceded by Oberst Theo Osterkamp	Commander of Jagdgeschwader 51; 27 July 1940 – 19 July 1941	Succeeded by Oberstleutnant Friedrich Beckh
Preceded by Generalmajor Kurt-Bertram von Döring	Inspekteur der Jagdflieger; 7 August 1941 – 22 November 1941	Succeeded by Generalleutnant Adolf Galland
