= High Urpeth =

Hamlet in County Durham, England

Coordinates: 54°52′47″N 1°37′51″W

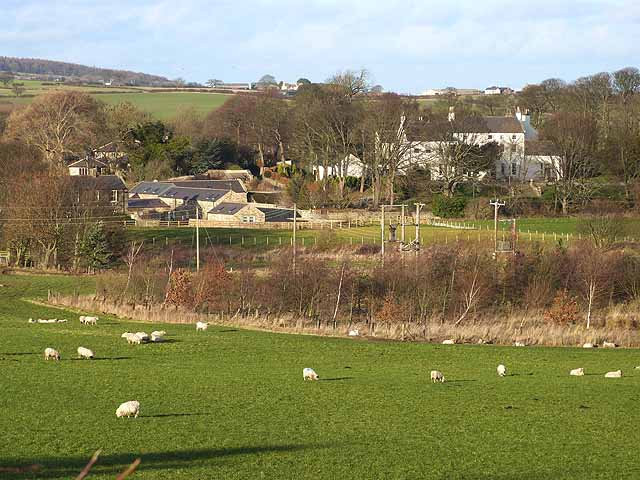
- South Farm

- Location within County Durham
- Civil parish: Urpeth
- Unitary authority: County Durham
- Ceremonial county: Durham
- Region: North East
- Country: England
- Sovereign state: United Kingdom
- Police: Durham
- Fire: County Durham and Darlington
- Ambulance: North East

High Urpeth is a hamlet in the civil parish of Urpeth, in County Durham, England. It is situated to the west of Urpeth, and a short distance to the north of High Handenhold.
