= Heighway =

Heighway is a surname. Notable persons with the surname include:

- Carolyn M. Heighway (born 1943), British archeologist
- Freida Ruth Heighway, (1907–1963), Australian obstetrician and gynaecologist
- Geoffrey Heighway, inventor of the micromodel concept
- Richard Heighway (1832–1917), British illustrator
- Steve Heighway (born 1947), Irish footballer
- Victoria Heighway (born 1980), New Zealand rugby union player

== See also ==
- Heighway dragon, a kind of fractal curve
- Heighway Pinball, a British company
- Highway (disambiguation), including some people with that surname
