= Ouston, County Durham =

Village and civil parish in County Durham, England

Coordinates: 54.884°N 1.598°W

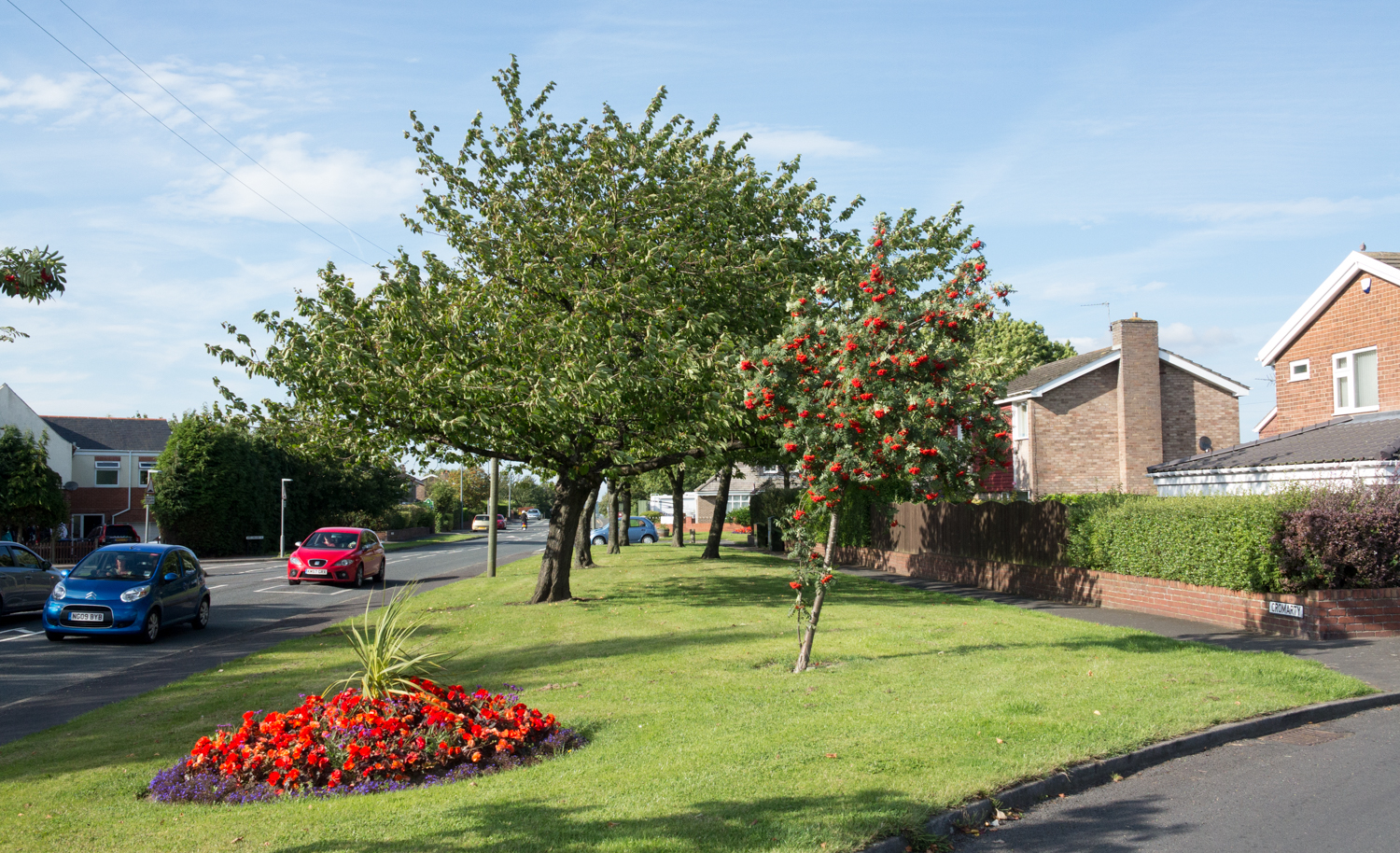
A small green in Ouston

Ouston is a village in County Durham, about 8 miles (13 kilometres) south-west of Newcastle upon Tyne in the north-east of England. The main village of Ouston (formerly called Ulkerton in earlier medieval times) is adjoined by the 1970s built housing estate known as Urpeth Grange but both are referred to colloquially as Ouston by locals. The population of the parish, according to the 2011 census, was 2,821.

== Governance ==
Ouston is part of the electoral ward named Ouston and Urpeth. The total population of this ward at the 2011 census was 7,490.

== Schools ==
There were three schools in Ouston: St. Benet's Roman Catholic Infant & Junior School which has celebrated their 50th anniversary of the school, Ouston Infant and Ouston Junior school. Ouston Junior School was opened in December 1964. In 2014, the Infant and Junior schools were amalgamated on the site of the Junior School to form Ouston Primary. This school also provides a venue for several community activities and is often the venue for local cross country events.

== Amenities ==
There are two pubs: the Red Lion in Ouston and The Cherry Tree in Urpeth Grange. A Working men's club (The Ranch) is also situated in the neighbouring village of Perkinsville. Shops are limited to a Post Office located in the petrol station, a hairdressers and a couple of general stores. Organisations based in the village include the Ouston and Urpeth Conservation Volunteers and the Ouston Villagers Association.

== Transport ==
There are regular bus routes through Ouston with the Go North East bus company. The 34 bus runs from Ouston to Chester-le-Street, and the 28 and 29 buses run from Chester-le-Street through Ouston and into Newcastle upon Tyne via Gateshead.

== Locality ==
The village itself was mostly constructed in 1961 with the showhomes being in Ardrossan opposite the Junior School which opened in 1964. Over time, the village expanded to its current size with further expansion continuing from Penhill, Urpeth, in the early 1970s onwards. In recent years. the housing development has rebegun in earnest in Turnberry and Woodlands, the former being a disused farmer's field with some World War II bunkers in it and the latter being an area next to the council estate (The Brooms) in an area near Walter's Wood.
