= Hildasay =

Island in the Shetland Islands, Scotland

Hildasay (Scots)

Location
- Location within Shetland
- OS grid reference: HU355403
- Coordinates: 60.14°N 1.36°W

Name
- Name meaning: battle island, or island of Hilda
- Old Norse name: Hildasey

Physical geography
- Island group: Shetland
- Area: 108 ha (267 acres)
- Area rank: 146
- Highest elevation: 32 m (105 ft)

Administration
- Council area: Shetland Islands
- Country: Scotland
- Sovereign state: United Kingdom

Demographics
- Population: 1

Hildasay (Shaetlan pronunciation: [ˈhɪɫdəsi] HILL-də-see; Old Norse: Hildisey) (from the Old Norse masculine name Hildir with ey "island"), also known as Hildisay, is an uninhabited island off the west coast of the Shetland Mainland.

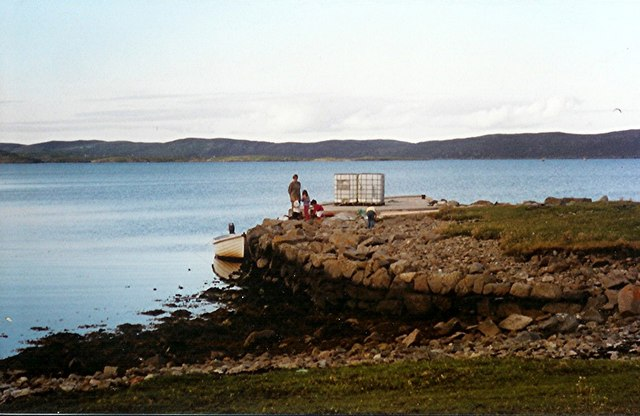
The pier on Hildasay

== Geography and geology ==
Hildasay has an area of 108 hectares (267 acres), and is 32 metres (105 ft) in elevation at its highest point. It consists of red-green granite (epidotic syenite) that was quarried for many years.

The south coast has two narrow inlets, Cusa Voe and Tangi Voe. "West", the larger of two lochs, has a single islet. A satellite island, Linga lies to the south east. A long line of skerries and holms lies to the north west.

== History ==
Hildasay has been uninhabited since the late nineteenth century, but as late as 1891 had a population of 30. The island's former industries included curing herring and quarrying granite. The remains of a railway line leading from the quarry to the harbour can still be seen.

As of 2020 there was one house on the island (a former shepherd's hut) with a solid-fuel stove, a raised open-plan sleeping area, and a separate bathroom with a shower, wash basin and toilet. The house was temporarily occupied by charity walker Chris Lewis and his dog Jet when movement restrictions were imposed during the COVID-19 pandemic with the assistance of a regular boat drop bringing fresh water and coal. The island is off-grid and previous owners have made use of a small wind turbine and diesel generator.
