= Urpeth =

Village in County Durham, United Kingdom

Coordinates: 54°52′52″N 1°37′52″W

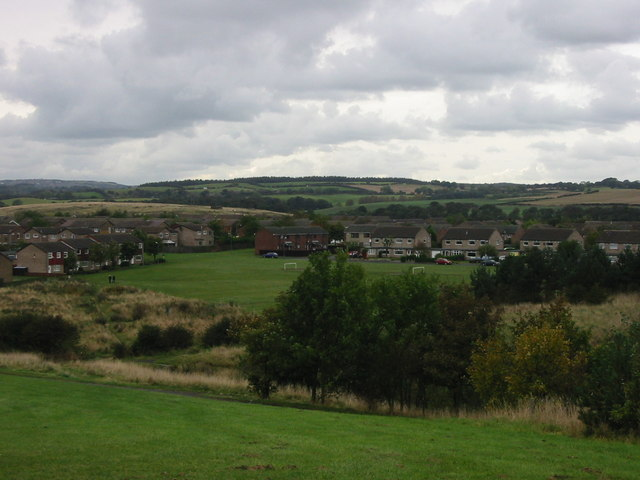
Urpeth Grange Estate

Urpeth (Urpeth Grange) is a village in County Durham, England. It is situated a short distance from Ouston and Beamish, near the border with Tyne and Wear. The parish population taken at the 2011 census was 3,630.

Urpeth was once host to a controversial landfill site to the south west of its main location. The site was used for the disposal of low level radioactive waste along with three other sites at Kibblesworth, Ryton and Cowpen Bewley. In the late 1990s, the site was closed and a methane burner sits on the site.
