= Highway, Cornwall =

Hamlet in Cornwall, England

Coordinates: 50.2466°N 5.20539°W

Highway is a hamlet in the parish of Redruth (where the population was included), Cornwall, England.
