= Hillhead, Cornwall =

Hamlet in Cornwall, England

Coordinates: 50.415°N 4.679°W

Hillhead
- Location within Cornwall
- OS grid reference: SX098607
- Civil parish: Lostwithiel
- Unitary authority: Cornwall
- Ceremonial county: Cornwall
- Region: South West
- Country: England
- Sovereign state: United Kingdom
- Post town: Lostwithiel
- Postcode district: PL22 0

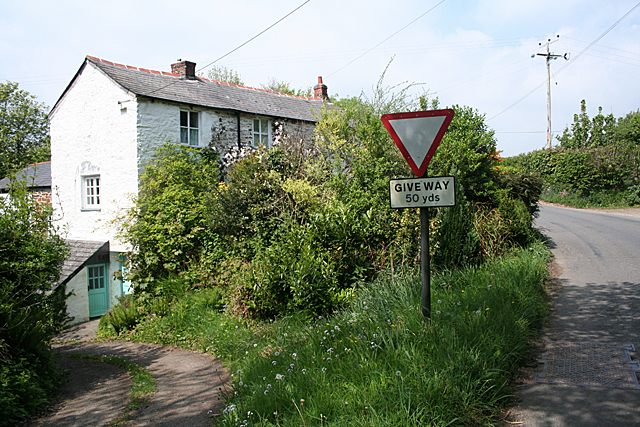

Hillhead is a hamlet in the parish of Lostwithiel, Cornwall, England.
